= 2018 4 Hours of Spa-Francorchamps =

The layout of Circuit de Spa-Francorchamps, where the race was held

The 2018 4 Hours of Spa-Francorchamps was an endurance sportscar racing event held on September 23, 2018, at Circuit de Spa-Francorchamps. It was the fifth round of the 2018 European Le Mans Series.

== Race ==
=== Race results ===
The race was red flagged with two hours remaining due to heavy rain.

Class winners are in bold and ‡.

Pos	Class	No	Team	Drivers	Chassis	Tyre	Laps	Time/Retired
Pos	Class	No	Team	Drivers	Engine	Tyre	Laps	Time/Retired
1	**LMP2**	**22**	**(United States) United Autosports**	**(Portugal) Filipe Albuquerque** **(United Kingdom) Phil Hanson**	**Ligier JS P217**	MI	**40**	**2:01:20.812‡**
1	**LMP2**	**22**	**(United States) United Autosports**	**(Portugal) Filipe Albuquerque** **(United Kingdom) Phil Hanson**	**Gibson GK428 4.2 L V8**	MI	**40**	**2:01:20.812‡**
2	LMP2	21	(United States) DragonSpeed	(United Kingdom) Ben Hanley (Sweden) Henrik Hedman (France) Nicolas Lapierre	Oreca 07	MI	40	+1.862
2	LMP2	21	(United States) DragonSpeed	(United Kingdom) Ben Hanley (Sweden) Henrik Hedman (France) Nicolas Lapierre	Gibson GK428 4.2 L V8	MI	40	+1.862
3	LMP2	23	(France) Panis Barthez Competition	(France) Timothé Buret (France) Julien Canal (United Kingdom) Will Stevens	Ligier JS P217	MI	40	+8.702
3	LMP2	23	(France) Panis Barthez Competition	(France) Timothé Buret (France) Julien Canal (United Kingdom) Will Stevens	Gibson GK428 4.2 L V8	MI	40	+8.702
4	LMP2	28	(France) IDEC Sport	(France) Paul-Loup Chatin (France) Gabriel Aubry (Mexico) Memo Rojas	Oreca 07	MI	40	+12.760
4	LMP2	28	(France) IDEC Sport	(France) Paul-Loup Chatin (France) Gabriel Aubry (Mexico) Memo Rojas	Gibson GK428 4.2 L V8	MI	40	+12.760
5	LMP2	29	(France) Duqueine Engineering	(France) Nico Jamin (France) Nelson Panciatici (France) Pierre Ragues	Oreca 07	MI	40	+17.389
5	LMP2	29	(France) Duqueine Engineering	(France) Nico Jamin (France) Nelson Panciatici (France) Pierre Ragues	Gibson GK428 4.2 L V8	MI	40	+17.389
6	LMP2	32	(United States) United Autosports	(United Kingdom) Wayne Boyd (United States) Will Owen (Switzerland) Hugo de Sadeleer	Ligier JS P217	MI	40	+19.113
6	LMP2	32	(United States) United Autosports	(United Kingdom) Wayne Boyd (United States) Will Owen (Switzerland) Hugo de Sadeleer	Gibson GK428 4.2 L V8	MI	40	+19.113
7	LMP2	24	(Spain) Racing Engineering	(France) Norman Nato (France) Paul Petit (France) Olivier Pla	Oreca 07	D	40	+21.203
7	LMP2	24	(Spain) Racing Engineering	(France) Norman Nato (France) Paul Petit (France) Olivier Pla	Gibson GK428 4.2 L V8	D	40	+21.203
8	LMP2	39	(France) Graff	(France) Alexandre Cougnaud (France) Tristan Gommendy (Switzerland) Jonathan Hirschi	Oreca 07	D	40	+23.237
8	LMP2	39	(France) Graff	(France) Alexandre Cougnaud (France) Tristan Gommendy (Switzerland) Jonathan Hirschi	Gibson GK428 4.2 L V8	D	40	+23.237
9	LMP2	30	(Spain) AVF by Adrián Vallés	(Portugal) Henrique Chaves (Russia) Konstantin Tereschenko	Dallara P217	D	40	+25.093
9	LMP2	30	(Spain) AVF by Adrián Vallés	(Portugal) Henrique Chaves (Russia) Konstantin Tereschenko	Gibson GK428 4.2 L V8	D	40	+25.093
10	LMP2	47	(Italy) Cetilar Villorba Corse	(Italy) Roberto Lacorte (Brazil) Felipe Nasr (Italy) Giorgio Sernagiotto	Dallara P217	D	40	+25.741
10	LMP2	47	(Italy) Cetilar Villorba Corse	(Italy) Roberto Lacorte (Brazil) Felipe Nasr (Italy) Giorgio Sernagiotto	Gibson GK428 4.2 L V8	D	40	+25.741
11	**LMP3**	**2**	**(United States) United Autosports**	**(United States) John Falb** **(Australia) Scott Andrews**	**Ligier JS P3**	MI	**40**	**+43.501‡**
11	**LMP3**	**2**	**(United States) United Autosports**	**(United States) John Falb** **(Australia) Scott Andrews**	**Nissan VK50VE 5.0 L V8**	MI	**40**	**+43.501‡**
12	LMP2	40	(Russia) G-Drive Racing	(Australia) James Allen (Sweden) Henning Enqvist (France) Julien Falchero	Oreca 07	D	40	+58.042
12	LMP2	40	(Russia) G-Drive Racing	(Australia) James Allen (Sweden) Henning Enqvist (France) Julien Falchero	Gibson GK428 4.2 L V8	D	40	+58.042
13	LMP3	15	(United Kingdom) RLR MSport	(Canada) John Farano (United Kingdom) Robert Garofall (Netherlands) Job van Uitert	Ligier JS P3	MI	40	+1:20.209
13	LMP3	15	(United Kingdom) RLR MSport	(Canada) John Farano (United Kingdom) Robert Garofall (Netherlands) Job van Uitert	Nissan VK50VE 5.0 L V8	MI	40	+1:20.209
14	LMP2	26	(Russia) G-Drive Racing	(France) Andrea Pizzitola (Russia) Roman Rusinov (France) Jean-Éric Vergne	Oreca 07	D	40	+2:59.522
14	LMP2	26	(Russia) G-Drive Racing	(France) Andrea Pizzitola (Russia) Roman Rusinov (France) Jean-Éric Vergne	Gibson GK428 4.2 L V8	D	40	+2:59.522
15	LMP3	6	(United Kingdom) 360 Racing	(United Kingdom) Ross Kaiser (United Kingdom) Terrence Woodward	Ligier JS P3	MI	39	+1 Lap
15	LMP3	6	(United Kingdom) 360 Racing	(United Kingdom) Ross Kaiser (United Kingdom) Terrence Woodward	Nissan VK50VE 5.0 L V8	MI	39	+1 Lap
16	LMP3	3	(United States) United Autosports	(United Kingdom) Matt Bell (Canada) Garett Grist (United Kingdom) Anthony Wells	Ligier JS P3	MI	39	+1 Lap
16	LMP3	3	(United States) United Autosports	(United Kingdom) Matt Bell (Canada) Garett Grist (United Kingdom) Anthony Wells	Nissan VK50VE 5.0 L V8	MI	39	+1 Lap
17	LMP3	18	(France) MRacing – YMR	(France) Natan Bihel (France) Laurent Millara	Ligier JS P3	MI	39	+1 Lap
17	LMP3	18	(France) MRacing – YMR	(France) Natan Bihel (France) Laurent Millara	Nissan VK50VE 5.0 L V8	MI	39	+1 Lap
18	**LMGTE**	**80**	**(Italy) Ebimotors**	**(Italy) Fabio Babini** **(United States) Bret Curtis** **(Italy) Riccardo Pera**	**Porsche 911 RSR**	D	**39**	**+1 Lap‡**
18	**LMGTE**	**80**	**(Italy) Ebimotors**	**(Italy) Fabio Babini** **(United States) Bret Curtis** **(Italy) Riccardo Pera**	**Porsche 4.0 L Flat-6**	D	**39**	**+1 Lap‡**
19	LMP3	4	(Switzerland) Cool Racing	(Switzerland) Antonin Borga (Switzerland) Alexandre Coigny	Ligier JS P3	MI	39	+1 Lap
19	LMP3	4	(Switzerland) Cool Racing	(Switzerland) Antonin Borga (Switzerland) Alexandre Coigny	Nissan VK50VE 5.0 L V8	MI	39	+1 Lap
20	LMGTE	55	(Switzerland) Spirit of Race	(United Kingdom) Duncan Cameron (Republic of Ireland) Matt Griffin (United Kingdom) Aaron Scott	Ferrari 488 GTE	D	39	+1 Lap
20	LMGTE	55	(Switzerland) Spirit of Race	(United Kingdom) Duncan Cameron (Republic of Ireland) Matt Griffin (United Kingdom) Aaron Scott	Ferrari F154CB 3.9 L Turbo V8	D	39	+1 Lap
21	LMGTE	88	(Germany) Proton Competition	(Italy) Matteo Cairoli (Italy) Gianluca Roda (Italy) Giorgio Roda	Porsche 911 RSR	D	39	+1 Lap
21	LMGTE	88	(Germany) Proton Competition	(Italy) Matteo Cairoli (Italy) Gianluca Roda (Italy) Giorgio Roda	Porsche 4.0 L Flat-6	D	39	+1 Lap
22	LMP2	25	(Portugal) Algarve Pro Racing	(United States) Matt McMurry (South Korea) Tacksung Kim (United States) Mark Patterson	Ligier JS P217	D	39	+1 Lap
22	LMP2	25	(Portugal) Algarve Pro Racing	(United States) Matt McMurry (South Korea) Tacksung Kim (United States) Mark Patterson	Gibson GK428 4.2 L V8	D	39	+1 Lap
23	LMP3	10	(Italy) Oregon Team	(France) Clément Mateu (Colombia) Andrés Méndez (Italy) Riccardo Ponzio	Norma M30	MI	39	+1 Lap
23	LMP3	10	(Italy) Oregon Team	(France) Clément Mateu (Colombia) Andrés Méndez (Italy) Riccardo Ponzio	Nissan VK50VE 5.0 L V8	MI	39	+1 Lap
24	LMP3	19	(France) MRacing – YMR	(Switzerland) David Droux (France) Romano Ricci (Switzerland) Lucas Légeret	Norma M30	MI	39	+1 Lap
24	LMP3	19	(France) MRacing – YMR	(Switzerland) David Droux (France) Romano Ricci (Switzerland) Lucas Légeret	Nissan VK50VE 5.0 L V8	MI	39	+1 Lap
25	LMGTE	66	(United Kingdom) JMW Motorsport	(United Kingdom) Liam Griffin (United Kingdom) Alex MacDowall (Spain) Miguel Molina	Ferrari 488 GTE	D	38	+2 Laps
25	LMGTE	66	(United Kingdom) JMW Motorsport	(United Kingdom) Liam Griffin (United Kingdom) Alex MacDowall (Spain) Miguel Molina	Ferrari F154CB 3.9 L Turbo V8	D	38	+2 Laps
26	LMP3	7	(United Kingdom) Ecurie Ecosse/Nielsen	(United Kingdom) Alex Kapadia (United Kingdom) Colin Noble (Norway) Christian Stubbe Olsen	Ligier JS P3	MI	38	+2 Laps
26	LMP3	7	(United Kingdom) Ecurie Ecosse/Nielsen	(United Kingdom) Alex Kapadia (United Kingdom) Colin Noble (Norway) Christian Stubbe Olsen	Nissan VK50VE 5.0 L V8	MI	38	+2 Laps
27	LMP3	5	(Spain) NEFIS by Speed Factory	(Russia) Timur Boguslavskiy (Ukraine) Aleksey Chuklin (Russia) Daniil Pronenko	Ligier JS P3	MI	38	+2 Laps
27	LMP3	5	(Spain) NEFIS by Speed Factory	(Russia) Timur Boguslavskiy (Ukraine) Aleksey Chuklin (Russia) Daniil Pronenko	Nissan VK50VE 5.0 L V8	MI	38	+2 Laps
28	LMP3	8	(Luxembourg) DKR Engineering	(France) Marvin Klein (Switzerland) Christian Vaglio	Norma M30	MI	38	+2 Laps
28	LMP3	8	(Luxembourg) DKR Engineering	(France) Marvin Klein (Switzerland) Christian Vaglio	Nissan VK50VE 5.0 L V8	MI	38	+2 Laps
29	LMP3	13	(Poland) Inter Europol Competition	(Germany) Martin Hippe (Poland) Jakub Śmiechowski	Ligier JS P3	MI	37	+3 Laps
29	LMP3	13	(Poland) Inter Europol Competition	(Germany) Martin Hippe (Poland) Jakub Śmiechowski	Nissan VK50VE 5.0 L V8	MI	37	+3 Laps
30	LMP3	11	(United States) EuroInternational	(Netherlands) Kay van Berlo (Italy) Giorgio Mondini (Italy) Mattia Drudi	Ligier JS P3	MI	34	+6 Laps
30	LMP3	11	(United States) EuroInternational	(Netherlands) Kay van Berlo (Italy) Giorgio Mondini (Italy) Mattia Drudi	Nissan VK50VE 5.0 L V8	MI	34	+6 Laps
31	LMP2	27	(France) IDEC Sport	(France) Erik Maris (France) Nicolas Minassian (France) Aurélien Panis	Ligier JS P217	D	34	+6 Laps
31	LMP2	27	(France) IDEC Sport	(France) Erik Maris (France) Nicolas Minassian (France) Aurélien Panis	Gibson GK428 4.2 L V8	D	34	+6 Laps
32	LMP2	31	(Portugal) APR – Rebellion Racing	(United Kingdom) Ryan Cullen (United States) Gustavo Menezes (United Kingdom) Harrison Newey	Oreca 07	D	31	+9 Laps
32	LMP2	31	(Portugal) APR – Rebellion Racing	(United Kingdom) Ryan Cullen (United States) Gustavo Menezes (United Kingdom) Harrison Newey	Gibson GK428 4.2 L V8	D	31	+9 Laps
33	LMP3	12	(United States) EuroInternational	(Canada) James Dayson (Italy) Andrea Dromedari	Ligier JS P3	MI	31	+9 Laps
33	LMP3	12	(United States) EuroInternational	(Canada) James Dayson (Italy) Andrea Dromedari	Nissan VK50VE 5.0 L V8	MI	31	+9 Laps
34	LMGTE	77	(Germany) Proton Competition	(Germany) Marvin Dienst (Norway) Dennis Olsen (Germany) Christian Ried	Porsche 911 RSR	D	31	+9 Laps
34	LMGTE	77	(Germany) Proton Competition	(Germany) Marvin Dienst (Norway) Dennis Olsen (Germany) Christian Ried	Porsche 4.0 L Flat-6	D	31	+9 Laps
35	LMP3	14	(Poland) Inter Europol Competition	(Switzerland) Moritz Müller-Crepon (Italy) Luca Demarchi (Germany) Paul Scheuschner	Ligier JS P3	MI	30	+10 Laps
35	LMP3	14	(Poland) Inter Europol Competition	(Switzerland) Moritz Müller-Crepon (Italy) Luca Demarchi (Germany) Paul Scheuschner	Nissan VK50VE 5.0 L V8	MI	30	+10 Laps
36	LMGTE	83	(United States) Krohn Racing	(Italy) Andrea Bertolini (Sweden) Niclas Jönsson (United States) Tracy Krohn	Ferrari 488 GTE	D	17	Accident
36	LMGTE	83	(United States) Krohn Racing	(Italy) Andrea Bertolini (Sweden) Niclas Jönsson (United States) Tracy Krohn	Ferrari F154CB 3.9 L Turbo V8	D	17	Accident
37	LMP3	9	(Austria) AT Racing	(France) Yann Clairay (Belarus) Alexander Talkanitsa (Belarus) Alexander Talkanitsa Jr.	Ligier JS P3	MI	12	Did not finish
37	LMP3	9	(Austria) AT Racing	(France) Yann Clairay (Belarus) Alexander Talkanitsa (Belarus) Alexander Talkanitsa Jr.	Nissan VK50VE 5.0 L V8	MI	12	Did not finish
38	LMP2	49	(Denmark) High Class Racing	(Denmark) Dennis Andersen (Denmark) Anders Fjordbach	Dallara P217	D	10	Did not finish
38	LMP2	49	(Denmark) High Class Racing	(Denmark) Dennis Andersen (Denmark) Anders Fjordbach	Gibson GK428 4.2 L V8	D	10	Did not finish
39	LMP3	17	(France) Ultimate	(France) François Heriau (France) Matthieu Lahaye (France) Jean-Baptiste Lahaye	Norma M30	MI	8	Accident
39	LMP3	17	(France) Ultimate	(France) François Heriau (France) Matthieu Lahaye (France) Jean-Baptiste Lahaye	Nissan VK50VE 5.0 L V8	MI	8	Accident
40	LMP3	16	(United Kingdom) BHK Motorsport	(Italy) Jacopo Baratto (Italy) Francesco Dracone	Ligier JS P3	MI	4	Did not finish
40	LMP3	16	(United Kingdom) BHK Motorsport	(Italy) Jacopo Baratto (Italy) Francesco Dracone	Nissan VK50VE 5.0 L V8	MI	4	Did not finish

European Le Mans Series
Previous race: 4 Hours of Silverstone	2018 season	Next race: 4 Hours of Portimão
