= 2018 4 Hours of Red Bull Ring =

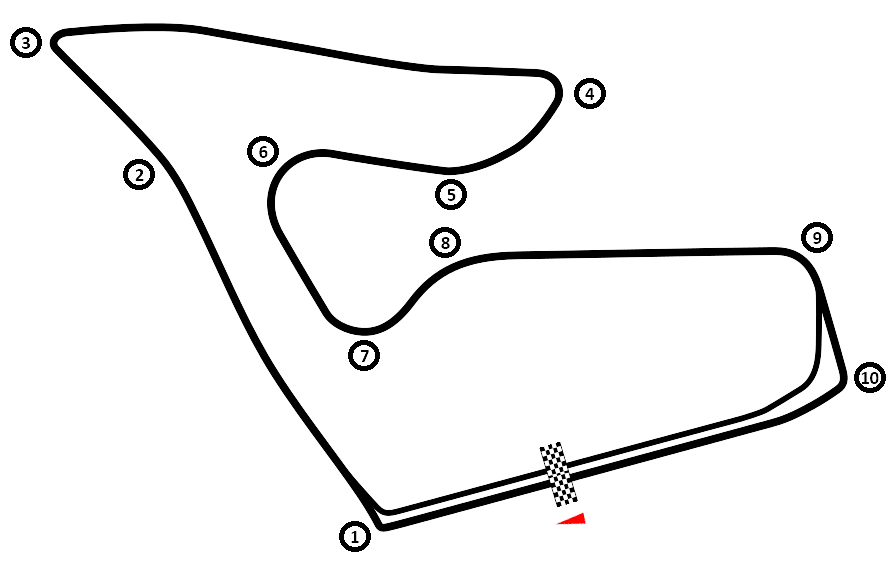
The layout of the Red Bull Ring, where the race was held.

The 2018 4 Hours of Red Bull Ring was an endurance sportscar racing event held on 22 July 2018 at the Red Bull Ring. It was the third round of the 2018 European Le Mans Series, and the sixth running of the event as part of the European Le Mans Series.

== Background ==
The event was announced on 23 September 2017, with the Red Bull Ring round being a part of the calendar for the sixth consecutive time. This was the first race after a two-month hiatus for the ELMS season, with the last round having taken place at Monza, ten weeks prior.

== Entry list ==
The entry list was revealed on 19 July 2018, and saw 42 entries: 18 in LMP2, 18 in LMP3, and 6 in LMGTE.

== Schedule ==
Date	Time (local: CEST)	Event
Friday, 20 July	13:00	Free Practice 1
Friday, 20 July	17:35	Bronze Driver Test
Saturday, 21 July	09:15	Free Practice 2
Saturday, 21 July	13:40	Qualifying - LMGTE
Saturday, 21 July	14:00	Qualifying - LMP3
Saturday, 21 July	14:20	Qualifying - LMP2
Sunday, 22 July	12:00	Race

== Practice ==
There were two practice sessions held: one on Friday afternoon and one on Saturday morning. Both session ran for 90 minutes.

=== Practice 1 ===
The first practice session was held at 13:00 CEST on Friday. Paul-Loup Chatin ended up quickest in the No. 28 IDEC Sport Oreca, with a lap time of 1:20.067. Norman Nato was second-quickest in the No. 24 Racing Engineering Oreca, only 0.003s off Chatin. Matthieu Vaxivière finished third in the No. 33 TDS Racing Oreca. LMP3 was topped by Matthieu Lahaye in the No. 17 Ultimate Norma, lapping the circuit in 1 minute, 26.927 seconds. He was 0.018s quicker than second-placed Matt Bell in the No. 3 United Autosports Ligier. GTE was topped by Miguel Molina in the No. 66 JMW Motorsport Ferrari, with a lap of 1:28.829, 0.570s quicker than the second-placed No. 88 Proton Competition Porsche.

Class	No.	Entrant	Driver	Time
LMP2	28	(France) IDEC Sport	(France) Paul-Loup Chatin	1:20.067
LMP3	17	(France) Ultimate	(France) Matthieu Lahaye	1:26.927
LMGTE	66	(United Kingdom) JMW Motorsport	(Spain) Miguel Molina	1:28.829

- Note: Only the fastest car in each class is shown.

=== Final practice ===
The second and final practice session took place at 09:15 CEST on Saturday, and ended with Chatin and the No. 28 Oreca topping the time sheets in a largely wet practice session. He lapped the circuit in 1 minute, 19.616 seconds. He was 0.134s quicker than Andrea Pizzitola in the No. 26 G-Drive Racing Oreca, with Nato third-quickest. Job van Uitert was quickest in LMP3 in the No. 15 RLR MSport Ligier: 1:27.176. David Droux was second-quickest in LMP3, 0.604s slower than Van Uitert. GTE was topped by Matt Griffin in the No. 55 Spirit of Race Ferrari, with a lap of 1:29.845. Dennis Olsen was second-quickest in the No. 77 Proton Competition Porsche, lapping 0.177s slower than Griffin, with Fabio Babini completing the top three in the No. 80 Ebimotors Porsche.

Class	No.	Entrant	Driver	Time
LMP2	28	(France) IDEC Sport	(France) Paul-Loup Chatin	1:19.616
LMP3	15	(United Kingdom) RLR MSport	(Netherlands) Job van Uitert	1:27.176
LMGTE	55	(Switzerland) Spirit of Race	(Republic of Ireland) Matt Griffin	1:29.845

- Note: Only the fastest car in each class is shown.

== Qualifying ==
Qualifying started at 13:40 CEST on Saturday, and was split into three sessions: one for LMGTE, one for LMP3, and one for LMP2. Each session lasted fifteen minutes. Paul-Loup Chatin continued his strong practice pace and claimed overall pole position in his No. 28 Oreca. He shared the front row with Nico Jamin in the No. 29 Duqueine Engineering Oreca, who was 0.019s slower than Chatin. The No. 9 AT Racing Ligier originally claimed pole position in the LMP3 class, but saw its fastest lap deleted after a track limits violation. This handed LMP3 pole position to the No. 17 Norma of Matthieu Lahaye, with a lap time of 1:26.519. The No. 19 MRacing - YMR Norma of Lucas Legeret qualified second, 0.064s slower. Molina took pole in LMGTE in the No. 66 Ferrari, ahead of Matteo Cairoli in the No. 88 Porsche, with Andrea Bertolini in the No. 83 Krohn Racing Ferrari in third.

=== Qualifying results ===
Pole position winners in each class are in bold.

Pos	Class	No.	Team	Time	Gap	Grid
1	**LMP2**	**28**	**(France) IDEC Sport**	**1:19.246**	–	1
2	LMP2	29	(France) Duqueine Engineering	1:19.265	+0.019	2
3	LMP2	24	(Spain) Racing Engineering	1:19.387	+0.141	3
4	LMP2	21	(United States) DragonSpeed	1:19.423	+0.177	4
5	LMP2	26	(Russia) G-Drive Racing	1:19.562	+0.316	5
6	LMP2	33	(France) TDS Racing	1:19.743	+0.497	6
7	LMP2	22	(United States) United Autosports	1:19.950	+0.704	7
8	LMP2	40	(Russia) G-Drive Racing	1:19.959	+0.713	8
9	LMP2	39	(France) Graff	1:20.179	+0.933	9
10	LMP2	47	(Italy) Cetilar Villorba Corse	1:20.234	+0.988	10
11	LMP2	35	(Russia) SMP Racing	1:20.351	+1.105	11
12	LMP2	32	(United States) United Autosports	1:20.383	+1.137	12
13	LMP2	49	(Denmark) High Class Racing	1:20.609	+1.363	13
14	LMP2	31	(Portugal) APR – Rebellion Racing	1:20.622	+1.376	14
15	LMP2	23	(France) Panis Barthez Competition	1:21.091	+1.845	15
16	LMP2	30	(Spain) AVF by Adrián Vallés	1:21.362	+2.116	16
17	LMP2	25	(Portugal) Algarve Pro Racing	1:23.522	+4.276	17
18	LMP2	27	(France) IDEC Sport	1:23.695	+4.449	18
19	**LMP3**	**17**	**(France) Ultimate**	**1:26.519**	**+7.273**	19
20	LMP3	19	(France) MRacing – YMR	1:26.583	+7.337	20
21	LMP3	15	(United Kingdom) RLR MSport	1:26.703	+7.457	21
22	LMP3	4	(Switzerland) Cool Racing	1:26.751	+7.505	22
23	LMP3	8	(Luxembourg) DKR Engineering	1:26.917	+7.671	23
24	LMP3	9	(Austria) AT Racing	1:26.960	+7.714	24
25	LMP3	10	(Italy) Oregon Team	1:27.008	+7.762	25
26	LMP3	2	(United States) United Autosports	1:27.032	+7.786	26
27	LMP3	7	(United Kingdom) Ecurie Ecosse/Nielsen	1:27.192	+7.946	27
28	LMP3	3	(United States) United Autosports	1:27.354	+8.108	28
29	LMP3	11	(United States) EuroInternational	1:27.365	+8.119	29
30	LMP3	13	(Poland) Inter Europol Competition	1:27.486	+8.240	30
31	LMP3	5	(Spain) NEFIS by Speed Factory	1:27.654	+8.408	31
32	LMP3	18	(France) MRacing – YMR	1:27.890	+8.644	32
33	LMP3	6	(United Kingdom) 360 Racing	1:28.133	+8.887	33
34	LMP3	16	(United Kingdom) BHK Motorsport	1:28.368	+9.122	34
35	**LMGTE**	**66**	**(United Kingdom) JMW Motorsport**	**1:28.827**	**+9.581**	35
36	LMP3	12	(United States) EuroInternational	1:28.893	+9.647	36
37	LMGTE	88	(Germany) Proton Competition	1:28.925	+9.679	37
38	LMGTE	83	(United States) Krohn Racing	1:28.967	+9.721	38
39	LMGTE	55	(Switzerland) Spirit of Race	1:29.190	+9.944	39
40	LMGTE	77	(Germany) Proton Competition	1:29.259	+10.013	40
41	LMGTE	80	(Italy) Ebimotors	1:29.366	+10.120	41
42	LMP3	14	(Poland) Inter Europol Competition	No time	–	42

== Race ==
Class winners are in bold and ‡.

Pos	Class	No	Team	Drivers	Chassis	Tyre	Laps	Time/Retired
Pos	Class	No	Team	Drivers	Engine	Tyre	Laps	Time/Retired
1	**LMP2**	**26**	**(Russia) G-Drive Racing**	**(France) Andrea Pizzitola (Russia) Roman Rusinov (France) Jean-Éric Vergne**	**Oreca 07**	D	**160**	**4:00:14.242‡**
1	**LMP2**	**26**	**(Russia) G-Drive Racing**	**(France) Andrea Pizzitola (Russia) Roman Rusinov (France) Jean-Éric Vergne**	**Gibson GK428 4.2 L V8**	D	**160**	**4:00:14.242‡**
2	LMP2	24	(Spain) Racing Engineering	(France) Norman Nato (France) Paul Petit (France) Olivier Pla	Oreca 07	D	160	+20.126
2	LMP2	24	(Spain) Racing Engineering	(France) Norman Nato (France) Paul Petit (France) Olivier Pla	Gibson GK428 4.2 L V8	D	160	+20.126
3	LMP2	22	(United States) United Autosports	(Portugal) Filipe Albuquerque (United Kingdom) Phil Hanson	Ligier JS P217	D	160	+54.166
3	LMP2	22	(United States) United Autosports	(Portugal) Filipe Albuquerque (United Kingdom) Phil Hanson	Gibson GK428 4.2 L V8	D	160	+54.166
4	LMP2	28	(France) IDEC Sport	(France) Paul-Loup Chatin (France) Paul Lafargue (Mexico) Memo Rojas	Oreca 07	MI	160	+56.087
4	LMP2	28	(France) IDEC Sport	(France) Paul-Loup Chatin (France) Paul Lafargue (Mexico) Memo Rojas	Gibson GK428 4.2 L V8	MI	160	+56.087
5	LMP2	21	(United States) DragonSpeed	(United Kingdom) Ben Hanley (Sweden) Henrik Hedman (France) Nicolas Lapierre	Oreca 07	MI	159	+1 Lap
5	LMP2	21	(United States) DragonSpeed	(United Kingdom) Ben Hanley (Sweden) Henrik Hedman (France) Nicolas Lapierre	Gibson GK428 4.2 L V8	MI	159	+1 Lap
6	LMP2	31	(Portugal) APR – Rebellion Racing	(United Kingdom) Ryan Cullen (United States) Gustavo Menezes (United Kingdom) Harrison Newey	Oreca 07	D	159	+1 Lap
6	LMP2	31	(Portugal) APR – Rebellion Racing	(United Kingdom) Ryan Cullen (United States) Gustavo Menezes (United Kingdom) Harrison Newey	Gibson GK428 4.2 L V8	D	159	+1 Lap
7	LMP2	35	(Russia) SMP Racing	(Russia) Matevos Isaakyan (Russia) Egor Orudzhev (Russia) Viktor Shaytar	Dallara P217	D	159	+1 Lap
7	LMP2	35	(Russia) SMP Racing	(Russia) Matevos Isaakyan (Russia) Egor Orudzhev (Russia) Viktor Shaytar	Gibson GK428 4.2 L V8	D	159	+1 Lap
8	LMP2	39	(France) Graff	(France) Alexandre Cougnaud (France) Tristan Gommendy (Switzerland) Jonathan Hirschi	Oreca 07	D	159	+1 Lap
8	LMP2	39	(France) Graff	(France) Alexandre Cougnaud (France) Tristan Gommendy (Switzerland) Jonathan Hirschi	Gibson GK428 4.2 L V8	D	159	+1 Lap
9	LMP2	33	(France) TDS Racing	(France) Loïc Duval (France) François Perrodo (France) Matthieu Vaxivière	Oreca 07	D	159	+1 Lap
9	LMP2	33	(France) TDS Racing	(France) Loïc Duval (France) François Perrodo (France) Matthieu Vaxivière	Gibson GK428 4.2 L V8	D	159	+1 Lap
10	LMP2	23	(France) Panis Barthez Competition	(France) Timothé Buret (France) Julien Canal (United Kingdom) Will Stevens	Ligier JS P217	MI	158	+2 Laps
10	LMP2	23	(France) Panis Barthez Competition	(France) Timothé Buret (France) Julien Canal (United Kingdom) Will Stevens	Gibson GK428 4.2 L V8	MI	158	+2 Laps
11	LMP2	47	(Italy) Cetilar Villorba Corse	(Italy) Roberto Lacorte (Brazil) Felipe Nasr (Italy) Giorgio Sernagiotto	Dallara P217	D	158	+2 Laps
11	LMP2	47	(Italy) Cetilar Villorba Corse	(Italy) Roberto Lacorte (Brazil) Felipe Nasr (Italy) Giorgio Sernagiotto	Gibson GK428 4.2 L V8	D	158	+2 Laps
12	LMP2	49	(Denmark) High Class Racing	(Denmark) Dennis Andersen (Denmark) Anders Fjordbach	Dallara P217	D	158	+2 Laps
12	LMP2	49	(Denmark) High Class Racing	(Denmark) Dennis Andersen (Denmark) Anders Fjordbach	Gibson GK428 4.2 L V8	D	158	+2 Laps
13	LMP2	40	(Russia) G-Drive Racing	(Australia) James Allen (Mexico) José Gutiérrez	Oreca 07	D	158	+2 Laps
13	LMP2	40	(Russia) G-Drive Racing	(Australia) James Allen (Mexico) José Gutiérrez	Gibson GK428 4.2 L V8	D	158	+2 Laps
14	LMP2	30	(Spain) AVF by Adrián Vallés	(Portugal) Henrique Chaves (Russia) Konstatin Tereschenko	Dallara P217	D	158	+2 Laps
14	LMP2	30	(Spain) AVF by Adrián Vallés	(Portugal) Henrique Chaves (Russia) Konstatin Tereschenko	Gibson GK428 4.2 L V8	D	158	+2 Laps
15	LMP2	32	(United States) United Autosports	(United Kingdom) Wayne Boyd (United States) Will Owen (Switzerland) Hugo de Sadeleer	Ligier JS P217	D	157	+3 Laps
15	LMP2	32	(United States) United Autosports	(United Kingdom) Wayne Boyd (United States) Will Owen (Switzerland) Hugo de Sadeleer	Gibson GK428 4.2 L V8	D	157	+3 Laps
16	LMP2	27	(France) IDEC Sport	(France) Patrice Lafargue (France) Erik Maris	Ligier JS P217	MI	154	+6 Laps
16	LMP2	27	(France) IDEC Sport	(France) Patrice Lafargue (France) Erik Maris	Gibson GK428 4.2 L V8	MI	154	+6 Laps
17	LMP2	25	(Portugal) Algarve Pro Racing	(Philippines) Ate De Jong (South Korea) Tacksung Kim (United States) Mark Patterson	Ligier JS P217	D	152	+8 Laps
17	LMP2	25	(Portugal) Algarve Pro Racing	(Philippines) Ate De Jong (South Korea) Tacksung Kim (United States) Mark Patterson	Gibson GK428 4.2 L V8	D	152	+8 Laps
18	**LMP3**	**15**	**(United Kingdom) RLR MSport**	**(Canada) John Farano (United Kingdom) Robert Garofall (Netherlands) Job van Uitert**	**Ligier JS P3**	MI	**148**	**+12 Laps‡**
18	**LMP3**	**15**	**(United Kingdom) RLR MSport**	**(Canada) John Farano (United Kingdom) Robert Garofall (Netherlands) Job van Uitert**	**Nissan VK50VE 5.0 L V8**	MI	**148**	**+12 Laps‡**
19	LMP3	7	(United Kingdom) Ecurie Ecosse/Nielsen	(United Kingdom) Alex Kapadia (United Kingdom) Colin Noble (Norway) Christian Stubbe Olsen	Ligier JS P3	MI	148	+12 Laps
19	LMP3	7	(United Kingdom) Ecurie Ecosse/Nielsen	(United Kingdom) Alex Kapadia (United Kingdom) Colin Noble (Norway) Christian Stubbe Olsen	Nissan VK50VE 5.0 L V8	MI	148	+12 Laps
20	LMP3	13	(Poland) Inter Europol Competition	(Germany) Martin Hippe (Poland) Jakub Śmiechowski	Ligier JS P3	MI	148	+12 Laps
20	LMP3	13	(Poland) Inter Europol Competition	(Germany) Martin Hippe (Poland) Jakub Śmiechowski	Nissan VK50VE 5.0 L V8	MI	148	+12 Laps
21	LMP3	17	(France) Ultimate	(France) François Heriau (France) Matthieu Lahaye (France) Jean-Baptiste Lahaye	Norma M30	MI	148	+12 Laps
21	LMP3	17	(France) Ultimate	(France) François Heriau (France) Matthieu Lahaye (France) Jean-Baptiste Lahaye	Nissan VK50VE 5.0 L V8	MI	148	+12 Laps
22	LMP3	9	(Austria) AT Racing	(Denmark) Mikkel Jensen (Belarus) Alexander Talkanitsa (Belarus) Alexander Talkanitsa Jr.	Ligier JS P3	MI	147	+13 Laps
22	LMP3	9	(Austria) AT Racing	(Denmark) Mikkel Jensen (Belarus) Alexander Talkanitsa (Belarus) Alexander Talkanitsa Jr.	Nissan VK50VE 5.0 L V8	MI	147	+13 Laps
23	LMP3	5	(Spain) NEFIS by Speed Factory	(Russia) Timur Boguslavskiy (Ukraine) Aleksey Chuklin (Russia) Daniil Pronenko	Ligier JS P3	MI	147	+13 Laps
23	LMP3	5	(Spain) NEFIS by Speed Factory	(Russia) Timur Boguslavskiy (Ukraine) Aleksey Chuklin (Russia) Daniil Pronenko	Nissan VK50VE 5.0 L V8	MI	147	+13 Laps
24	**LMGTE**	**88**	**(Germany) Proton Competition**	**(Italy) Matteo Cairoli (Italy) Gianluca Roda (Italy) Giorgio Roda**	**Porsche 911 RSR**	D	**147**	**+13 Laps‡**
24	**LMGTE**	**88**	**(Germany) Proton Competition**	**(Italy) Matteo Cairoli (Italy) Gianluca Roda (Italy) Giorgio Roda**	**Porsche 4.0 L Flat-6**	D	**147**	**+13 Laps‡**
25	LMP3	11	(United States) EuroInternational	(Netherlands) Kay van Berlo (Italy) Giorgio Mondini	Ligier JS P3	MI	147	+13 Laps (Note: The No. 11 EuroInternational Ligier received a drive-through during the race. Since they did not complete the drive-through, it was converted into a 25-second penalty. The car dropped from 24th to 25th overall.)
25	LMP3	11	(United States) EuroInternational	(Netherlands) Kay van Berlo (Italy) Giorgio Mondini	Nissan VK50VE 5.0 L V8	MI	147	+13 Laps
26	LMP3	6	(United Kingdom) 360 Racing	(United Kingdom) Ross Kaiser (United Kingdom) Terrence Woodward	Ligier JS P3	MI	146	+14 Laps
26	LMP3	6	(United Kingdom) 360 Racing	(United Kingdom) Ross Kaiser (United Kingdom) Terrence Woodward	Nissan VK50VE 5.0 L V8	MI	146	+14 Laps
27	LMGTE	55	(Switzerland) Spirit of Race	(United Kingdom) Duncan Cameron (Republic of Ireland) Matt Griffin (United Kingdom) Aaron Scott	Ferrari 488 GTE	D	146	+14 Laps
27	LMGTE	55	(Switzerland) Spirit of Race	(United Kingdom) Duncan Cameron (Republic of Ireland) Matt Griffin (United Kingdom) Aaron Scott	Ferrari F154CB 3.9 L Turbo V8	D	146	+14 Laps
28	LMP3	18	(France) MRacing – YMR	(France) Natan Bihel (France) Laurent Millara	Ligier JS P3	MI	146	+14 Laps
28	LMP3	18	(France) MRacing – YMR	(France) Natan Bihel (France) Laurent Millara	Nissan VK50VE 5.0 L V8	MI	146	+14 Laps
29	LMP3	4	(Switzerland) Cool Racing	(Switzerland) Iradj Alexander (Switzerland) Antonin Borga (Switzerland) Alexandre Coigny	Ligier JS P3	MI	146	+14 Laps
29	LMP3	4	(Switzerland) Cool Racing	(Switzerland) Iradj Alexander (Switzerland) Antonin Borga (Switzerland) Alexandre Coigny	Nissan VK50VE 5.0 L V8	MI	146	+14 Laps
30	LMGTE	80	(Italy) Ebimotors	(Italy) Fabio Babini (United States) Bret Curtis (Italy) Riccardo Pera	Porsche 911 RSR	D	146	+14 Laps
30	LMGTE	80	(Italy) Ebimotors	(Italy) Fabio Babini (United States) Bret Curtis (Italy) Riccardo Pera	Porsche 4.0 L Flat-6	D	146	+14 Laps
31	LMGTE	77	(Germany) Proton Competition	(Germany) Marvin Dienst (Norway) Dennis Olsen (Germany) Christian Ried	Porsche 911 RSR	D	145	+15 Laps
31	LMGTE	77	(Germany) Proton Competition	(Germany) Marvin Dienst (Norway) Dennis Olsen (Germany) Christian Ried	Porsche 4.0 L Flat-6	D	145	+15 Laps
32	LMP3	14	(Poland) Inter Europol Competition	(Italy) Guglielmo Belotti (Italy) Luca Demarchi (Germany) Paul Scheuschner	Ligier JS P3	MI	145	+15 Laps
32	LMP3	14	(Poland) Inter Europol Competition	(Italy) Guglielmo Belotti (Italy) Luca Demarchi (Germany) Paul Scheuschner	Nissan VK50VE 5.0 L V8	MI	145	+15 Laps
33	LMP3	3	(United States) United Autosports	(United Kingdom) Matt Bell (Canada) Garett Grist (United Kingdom) Anthony Wells	Ligier JS P3	MI	145	+15 Laps
33	LMP3	3	(United States) United Autosports	(United Kingdom) Matt Bell (Canada) Garett Grist (United Kingdom) Anthony Wells	Nissan VK50VE 5.0 L V8	MI	145	+15 Laps
34	LMP3	12	(United States) EuroInternational	(Canada) James Dayson (Italy) Andrea Dromedari (United States) Maxwell Hanratty	Ligier JS P3	MI	144	+16 Laps
34	LMP3	12	(United States) EuroInternational	(Canada) James Dayson (Italy) Andrea Dromedari (United States) Maxwell Hanratty	Nissan VK50VE 5.0 L V8	MI	144	+16 Laps
35	LMGTE	83	(United States) Krohn Racing	(Italy) Andrea Bertolini (Sweden) Niclas Jönsson (United States) Tracy Krohn	Ferrari 488 GTE	D	143	+17 Laps
35	LMGTE	83	(United States) Krohn Racing	(Italy) Andrea Bertolini (Sweden) Niclas Jönsson (United States) Tracy Krohn	Ferrari F154CB 3.9 L Turbo V8	D	143	+17 Laps
36	LMP3	8	(Luxembourg) DKR Engineering	(Sweden) Henning Enqvist (France) Fabien Lavergne (Mexico) Ricardo Sanchez	Norma M30	MI	142	+18 Laps
36	LMP3	8	(Luxembourg) DKR Engineering	(Sweden) Henning Enqvist (France) Fabien Lavergne (Mexico) Ricardo Sanchez	Nissan VK50VE 5.0 L V8	MI	142	+18 Laps
37	LMP3	16	(United Kingdom) BHK Motorsport	(Italy) Jacopo Baratto (Italy) Francesco Dracone	Ligier JS P3	MI	139	+21 Laps (Note: The No. 16 BHK Motorsport Ligier received a 2-lap penalty for not completing the minimum drive time with their bronze-rated driver Jacopo Baratto.)
37	LMP3	16	(United Kingdom) BHK Motorsport	(Italy) Jacopo Baratto (Italy) Francesco Dracone	Nissan VK50VE 5.0 L V8	MI	139	+21 Laps
38	LMP3	10	(Italy) Oregon Team	(France) Clément Mateu (Colombia) Andrés Méndez (Italy) Riccardo Ponzio	Norma M30	MI	132	+28 Laps
38	LMP3	10	(Italy) Oregon Team	(France) Clément Mateu (Colombia) Andrés Méndez (Italy) Riccardo Ponzio	Nissan VK50VE 5.0 L V8	MI	132	+28 Laps
39	LMP3	19	(France) MRacing – YMR	(Switzerland) David Droux (France) Alain Ferté (Switzerland) Lucas Légeret	Norma M30	MI	112	Not classified
39	LMP3	19	(France) MRacing – YMR	(Switzerland) David Droux (France) Alain Ferté (Switzerland) Lucas Légeret	Nissan VK50VE 5.0 L V8	MI	112	Not classified
40	LMP3	2	(United States) United Autosports	(United States) John Falb (United States) Sean Rayhall	Ligier JS P3	MI	70	Not classified
40	LMP3	2	(United States) United Autosports	(United States) John Falb (United States) Sean Rayhall	Nissan VK50VE 5.0 L V8	MI	70	Not classified
41	LMGTE	66	(United Kingdom) JMW Motorsport	(United Kingdom) Liam Griffin (United Kingdom) Alex MacDowall (Spain) Miguel Molina	Ferrari 488 GTE	D	43	Not classified
41	LMGTE	66	(United Kingdom) JMW Motorsport	(United Kingdom) Liam Griffin (United Kingdom) Alex MacDowall (Spain) Miguel Molina	Ferrari F154CB 3.9 L Turbo V8	D	43	Not classified
42	LMP2	29	(France) Duqueine Engineering	(France) Nico Jamin (France) Nelson Panciatici (France) Pierre Ragues	Oreca 07	MI	160	Disqualified (Note: The No. 29 Duqueine Engineering Oreca was disqualified from the race using a different fuel than the fuel that was indicated by the organiser. The car originally finished second overall.)
42	LMP2	29	(France) Duqueine Engineering	(France) Nico Jamin (France) Nelson Panciatici (France) Pierre Ragues	Gibson GK428 4.2 L V8	MI	160	Disqualified

== Notes ==
European Le Mans Series
Previous race: 4 Hours of Monza	2018 season	Next race: 4 Hours of Silverstone
