= 2018 4 Hours of Portimão =

The layout of Algarve International Circuit, where the race was held.

The 2018 4 Hours of Portimão was an endurance sportscar racing event held on October 28, 2018, at Algarve International Circuit. It was the sixth and final round of the 2018 European Le Mans Series.

== Race ==
=== Race results ===
Class winners are in bold and ‡.

| Pos | Class | No | Team | Drivers | Chassis | Tyre | Laps | Time/Retired |
| Pos | Class | No | Team | Drivers | Engine | Tyre | Laps | Time/Retired |
|---|---|---|---|---|---|---|---|---|
| 1 | **LMP2** | **22** | **(United States) United Autosports** | **(Portugal) Filipe Albuquerque** **(United Kingdom) Phil Hanson** | **Ligier JS P217** | D | 140 | **4:01:29.956‡** |
| 1 | **LMP2** | **22** | **(United States) United Autosports** | **(Portugal) Filipe Albuquerque** **(United Kingdom) Phil Hanson** | **Gibson GK428 4.2 L V8** | D | 140 | **4:01:29.956‡** |
| 2 | LMP2 | 23 | (France) Panis Barthez Competition | (France) Timothé Buret (France) Julien Canal (United Kingdom) Will Stevens | Ligier JS P217 | MI | 140 | +0.520 |
| 2 | LMP2 | 23 | (France) Panis Barthez Competition | (France) Timothé Buret (France) Julien Canal (United Kingdom) Will Stevens | Gibson GK428 4.2 L V8 | MI | 140 | +0.520 |
| 3 | LMP2 | 32 | (United States) United Autosports | (United Kingdom) Wayne Boyd (United States) Will Owen (Switzerland) Hugo de Sadeleer | Ligier JS P217 | D | 140 | +14.647 |
| 3 | LMP2 | 32 | (United States) United Autosports | (United Kingdom) Wayne Boyd (United States) Will Owen (Switzerland) Hugo de Sadeleer | Gibson GK428 4.2 L V8 | D | 140 | +14.647 |
| 4 | LMP2 | 26 | (Russia) G-Drive Racing | (France) Andrea Pizzitola (Russia) Roman Rusinov (France) Jean-Éric Vergne | Oreca 07 | D | 140 | +15.185 |
| 4 | LMP2 | 26 | (Russia) G-Drive Racing | (France) Andrea Pizzitola (Russia) Roman Rusinov (France) Jean-Éric Vergne | Gibson GK428 4.2 L V8 | D | 140 | +15.185 |
| 5 | LMP2 | 24 | (Spain) Racing Engineering | (France) Norman Nato (France) Paul Petit (France) Olivier Pla | Oreca 07 | D | 140 | +1:23.913 |
| 5 | LMP2 | 24 | (Spain) Racing Engineering | (France) Norman Nato (France) Paul Petit (France) Olivier Pla | Gibson GK428 4.2 L V8 | D | 140 | +1:23.913 |
| 6 | LMP2 | 28 | (France) IDEC Sport | (France) Paul-Loup Chatin (France) Gabriel Aubry (Mexico) Memo Rojas | Oreca 07 | MI | 139 | +1 Lap |
| 6 | LMP2 | 28 | (France) IDEC Sport | (France) Paul-Loup Chatin (France) Gabriel Aubry (Mexico) Memo Rojas | Gibson GK428 4.2 L V8 | MI | 139 | +1 Lap |
| 7 | LMP2 | 40 | (Russia) G-Drive Racing | (Australia) James Allen (Sweden) Henning Enqvist (France) Julien Falchero | Oreca 07 | D | 139 | +1 Lap |
| 7 | LMP2 | 40 | (Russia) G-Drive Racing | (Australia) James Allen (Sweden) Henning Enqvist (France) Julien Falchero | Gibson GK428 4.2 L V8 | D | 139 | +1 Lap |
| 8 | LMP2 | 39 | (France) Graff | (France) Alexandre Cougnaud (France) Tristan Gommendy (Switzerland) Jonathan Hirschi | Oreca 07 | D | 139 | +1 Lap |
| 8 | LMP2 | 39 | (France) Graff | (France) Alexandre Cougnaud (France) Tristan Gommendy (Switzerland) Jonathan Hirschi | Gibson GK428 4.2 L V8 | D | 139 | +1 Lap |
| 9 | LMP2 | 49 | (Denmark) High Class Racing | (Denmark) Dennis Andersen (Denmark) Anders Fjordbach | Dallara P217 | D | 138 | +2 Laps |
| 9 | LMP2 | 49 | (Denmark) High Class Racing | (Denmark) Dennis Andersen (Denmark) Anders Fjordbach | Gibson GK428 4.2 L V8 | D | 138 | +2 Laps |
| 10 | **LMP3** | **13** | **(Poland) Inter Europol Competition** | **(Germany) Martin Hippe** **(Poland) Jakub Śmiechowski** | **Ligier JS P3** | MI | **132** | **+8 Laps‡** |
| 10 | **LMP3** | **13** | **(Poland) Inter Europol Competition** | **(Germany) Martin Hippe** **(Poland) Jakub Śmiechowski** | **Nissan VK50VE 5.0 L V8** | MI | **132** | **+8 Laps‡** |
| 11 | LMP2 | 25 | (Portugal) Algarve Pro Racing | (Netherlands) Ate De Jong (South Korea) Tacksung Kim (United States) Mark Patterson | Ligier JS P217 | D | 132 | +8 Laps |
| 11 | LMP2 | 25 | (Portugal) Algarve Pro Racing | (Netherlands) Ate De Jong (South Korea) Tacksung Kim (United States) Mark Patterson | Gibson GK428 4.2 L V8 | D | 132 | +8 Laps |
| 12 | LMP3 | 7 | (United Kingdom) Ecurie Ecosse/Nielsen | (United Kingdom) Alex Kapadia (United Kingdom) Colin Noble (Norway) Christian Stubbe Olsen | Ligier JS P3 | MI | 132 | +8 Laps |
| 12 | LMP3 | 7 | (United Kingdom) Ecurie Ecosse/Nielsen | (United Kingdom) Alex Kapadia (United Kingdom) Colin Noble (Norway) Christian Stubbe Olsen | Nissan VK50VE 5.0 L V8 | MI | 132 | +8 Laps |
| 13 | LMP3 | 2 | (United States) United Autosports | (United States) John Falb (Australia) Scott Andrews | Ligier JS P3 | MI | 132 | +8 Laps |
| 13 | LMP3 | 2 | (United States) United Autosports | (United States) John Falb (Australia) Scott Andrews | Nissan VK50VE 5.0 L V8 | MI | 132 | +8 Laps |
| 14 | LMP3 | 5 | (Spain) NEFIS by Speed Factory | (Russia) Timur Boguslavskiy (Ukraine) Aleksey Chuklin (Russia) Daniil Pronenko | Ligier JS P3 | MI | 132 | +8 Laps |
| 14 | LMP3 | 5 | (Spain) NEFIS by Speed Factory | (Russia) Timur Boguslavskiy (Ukraine) Aleksey Chuklin (Russia) Daniil Pronenko | Nissan VK50VE 5.0 L V8 | MI | 132 | +8 Laps |
| 15 | LMP3 | 15 | (United Kingdom) RLR MSport | (Canada) John Farano (United Kingdom) Robert Garofall (Netherlands) Job van Uitert | Ligier JS P3 | MI | 131 | +9 Laps |
| 15 | LMP3 | 15 | (United Kingdom) RLR MSport | (Canada) John Farano (United Kingdom) Robert Garofall (Netherlands) Job van Uitert | Nissan VK50VE 5.0 L V8 | MI | 131 | +9 Laps |
| 16 | LMP3 | 9 | (Austria) AT Racing | (Denmark) Mikkel Jensen (Belarus) Alexander Talkanitsa (Belarus) Alexander Talkanitsa Jr. | Ligier JS P3 | MI | 131 | +9 Laps |
| 16 | LMP3 | 9 | (Austria) AT Racing | (Denmark) Mikkel Jensen (Belarus) Alexander Talkanitsa (Belarus) Alexander Talkanitsa Jr. | Nissan VK50VE 5.0 L V8 | MI | 131 | +9 Laps |
| 17 | LMP3 | 3 | (United States) United Autosports | (United Kingdom) Matt Bell (Canada) Garett Grist (United Kingdom) Anthony Wells | Ligier JS P3 | MI | 131 | +9 Laps |
| 17 | LMP3 | 3 | (United States) United Autosports | (United Kingdom) Matt Bell (Canada) Garett Grist (United Kingdom) Anthony Wells | Nissan VK50VE 5.0 L V8 | MI | 131 | +9 Laps |
| 18 | LMP3 | 14 | (Poland) Inter Europol Competition | (Switzerland) Moritz Müller-Crepon (Germany) Paul Scheuschner | Ligier JS P3 | MI | 131 | +9 Laps |
| 18 | LMP3 | 14 | (Poland) Inter Europol Competition | (Switzerland) Moritz Müller-Crepon (Germany) Paul Scheuschner | Nissan VK50VE 5.0 L V8 | MI | 131 | +9 Laps |
| 19 | LMP3 | 8 | (Luxembourg) DKR Engineering | (France) Marvin Klein (Switzerland) Christian Vaglio (Switzerland) Nicolas Maulini | Norma M30 | MI | 131 | +9 Laps |
| 19 | LMP3 | 8 | (Luxembourg) DKR Engineering | (France) Marvin Klein (Switzerland) Christian Vaglio (Switzerland) Nicolas Maulini | Nissan VK50VE 5.0 L V8 | MI | 131 | +9 Laps |
| 20 | **LMGTE** | **77** | **(Germany) Proton Competition** | **(Germany) Marvin Dienst** **(Norway) Dennis Olsen** **(Germany) Christian Ried** | **Porsche 911 RSR** | D | **130** | **+10 Laps‡** |
| 20 | **LMGTE** | **77** | **(Germany) Proton Competition** | **(Germany) Marvin Dienst** **(Norway) Dennis Olsen** **(Germany) Christian Ried** | **Porsche 4.0 L Flat-6** | D | **130** | **+10 Laps‡** |
| 21 | LMP3 | 19 | (France) MRacing – YMR | (Switzerland) David Droux (United Kingdom) Michael Benham (Switzerland) Lucas Légeret | Norma M30 | MI | 130 | +10 Laps |
| 21 | LMP3 | 19 | (France) MRacing – YMR | (Switzerland) David Droux (United Kingdom) Michael Benham (Switzerland) Lucas Légeret | Nissan VK50VE 5.0 L V8 | MI | 130 | +10 Laps |
| 22 | LMGTE | 66 | (United Kingdom) JMW Motorsport | (United Kingdom) Liam Griffin (United Kingdom) Alex MacDowall (Spain) Miguel Molina | Ferrari 488 GTE | D | 129 | +11 Laps |
| 22 | LMGTE | 66 | (United Kingdom) JMW Motorsport | (United Kingdom) Liam Griffin (United Kingdom) Alex MacDowall (Spain) Miguel Molina | Ferrari F154CB 3.9 L Turbo V8 | D | 129 | +11 Laps |
| 23 | LMGTE | 88 | (Germany) Proton Competition | (Italy) Matteo Cairoli (Italy) Gianluca Roda (Italy) Giorgio Roda | Porsche 911 RSR | D | 129 | +11 Laps |
| 23 | LMGTE | 88 | (Germany) Proton Competition | (Italy) Matteo Cairoli (Italy) Gianluca Roda (Italy) Giorgio Roda | Porsche 4.0 L Flat-6 | D | 129 | +11 Laps |
| 24 | LMP2 | 47 | (Italy) Cetilar Villorba Corse | (Italy) Roberto Lacorte (Brazil) Felipe Nasr (Italy) Giorgio Sernagiotto | Dallara P217 | D | 129 | +11 Laps |
| 24 | LMP2 | 47 | (Italy) Cetilar Villorba Corse | (Italy) Roberto Lacorte (Brazil) Felipe Nasr (Italy) Giorgio Sernagiotto | Gibson GK428 4.2 L V8 | D | 129 | +11 Laps |
| 25 | LMGTE | 55 | (Switzerland) Spirit of Race | (United Kingdom) Duncan Cameron (Republic of Ireland) Matt Griffin (United Kingdom) Aaron Scott | Ferrari 488 GTE | D | 129 | +11 Laps |
| 25 | LMGTE | 55 | (Switzerland) Spirit of Race | (United Kingdom) Duncan Cameron (Republic of Ireland) Matt Griffin (United Kingdom) Aaron Scott | Ferrari F154CB 3.9 L Turbo V8 | D | 129 | +11 Laps |
| 26 | LMP3 | 16 | (United Kingdom) BHK Motorsport | (Italy) Jacopo Baratto (Italy) Francesco Dracone | Ligier JS P3 | MI | 128 | +12 Laps |
| 26 | LMP3 | 16 | (United Kingdom) BHK Motorsport | (Italy) Jacopo Baratto (Italy) Francesco Dracone | Nissan VK50VE 5.0 L V8 | MI | 128 | +12 Laps |
| 27 | LMP3 | 17 | (France) Ultimate | (France) François Heriau (France) Matthieu Lahaye (France) Jean-Baptiste Lahaye | Norma M30 | MI | 128 | +12 Laps |
| 27 | LMP3 | 17 | (France) Ultimate | (France) François Heriau (France) Matthieu Lahaye (France) Jean-Baptiste Lahaye | Nissan VK50VE 5.0 L V8 | MI | 128 | +12 Laps |
| 28 | LMP2 | 31 | (Portugal) APR – Rebellion Racing | (United Kingdom) Ryan Cullen (United States) Gustavo Menezes (United Kingdom) Harrison Newey | Oreca 07 | D | 127 | +13 Laps |
| 28 | LMP2 | 31 | (Portugal) APR – Rebellion Racing | (United Kingdom) Ryan Cullen (United States) Gustavo Menezes (United Kingdom) Harrison Newey | Gibson GK428 4.2 L V8 | D | 127 | +13 Laps |
| 29 | LMGTE | 83 | (United States) Krohn Racing | (Italy) Andrea Bertolini (Sweden) Niclas Jönsson (United States) Tracy Krohn | Ferrari 488 GTE | D | 127 | +13 Laps |
| 29 | LMGTE | 83 | (United States) Krohn Racing | (Italy) Andrea Bertolini (Sweden) Niclas Jönsson (United States) Tracy Krohn | Ferrari F154CB 3.9 L Turbo V8 | D | 127 | +13 Laps |
| 30 | LMP3 | 4 | (Switzerland) Cool Racing | (Switzerland) Antonin Borga (Switzerland) Alexandre Coigny (Switzerland) Iradj Alexander | Ligier JS P3 | MI | 127 | +13 Laps |
| 30 | LMP3 | 4 | (Switzerland) Cool Racing | (Switzerland) Antonin Borga (Switzerland) Alexandre Coigny (Switzerland) Iradj Alexander | Nissan VK50VE 5.0 L V8 | MI | 127 | +13 Laps |
| 31 | LMP3 | 12 | (United States) EuroInternational | (Canada) James Dayson (Russia) Vadim Meshcheriakov (Italy) Luca Demarchi | Ligier JS P3 | MI | 126 | +14 Laps |
| 31 | LMP3 | 12 | (United States) EuroInternational | (Canada) James Dayson (Russia) Vadim Meshcheriakov (Italy) Luca Demarchi | Nissan VK50VE 5.0 L V8 | MI | 126 | +14 Laps |
| 32 | LMP3 | 10 | (Italy) Oregon Team | (France) Clément Mateu (Colombia) Andrés Méndez (Italy) Riccardo Ponzio | Norma M30 | MI | 115 | +25 Laps |
| 32 | LMP3 | 10 | (Italy) Oregon Team | (France) Clément Mateu (Colombia) Andrés Méndez (Italy) Riccardo Ponzio | Nissan VK50VE 5.0 L V8 | MI | 115 | +25 Laps |
| 33 | LMP3 | 6 | (United Kingdom) 360 Racing | (United Kingdom) Ross Kaiser (United Kingdom) Terrence Woodward | Ligier JS P3 | MI | 105 | +35 Laps |
| 33 | LMP3 | 6 | (United Kingdom) 360 Racing | (United Kingdom) Ross Kaiser (United Kingdom) Terrence Woodward | Nissan VK50VE 5.0 L V8 | MI | 105 | +35 Laps |
| 34 | LMP3 | 18 | (France) MRacing – YMR | (France) Natan Bihel (France) Laurent Millara | Ligier JS P3 | MI | 102 | +38 Laps |
| 34 | LMP3 | 18 | (France) MRacing – YMR | (France) Natan Bihel (France) Laurent Millara | Nissan VK50VE 5.0 L V8 | MI | 102 | +38 Laps |
| 35 | LMP2 | 21 | (United States) DragonSpeed | (United Kingdom) Ben Hanley (Sweden) Henrik Hedman (France) Nicolas Lapierre | Oreca 07 | MI | 100 | +40 Laps |
| 35 | LMP2 | 21 | (United States) DragonSpeed | (United Kingdom) Ben Hanley (Sweden) Henrik Hedman (France) Nicolas Lapierre | Gibson GK428 4.2 L V8 | MI | 100 | +40 Laps |
| 36 | LMP3 | 11 | (United States) EuroInternational | (Netherlands) Kay van Berlo (Italy) Giorgio Mondini (Italy) Mattia Drudi | Ligier JS P3 | MI | 85 | Did not finish |
| 36 | LMP3 | 11 | (United States) EuroInternational | (Netherlands) Kay van Berlo (Italy) Giorgio Mondini (Italy) Mattia Drudi | Nissan VK50VE 5.0 L V8 | MI | 85 | Did not finish |
| 37 | LMGTE | 80 | (Italy) Ebimotors | (Italy) Fabio Babini (Italy) Gianluca Giraudi (Italy) Riccardo Pera | Porsche 911 RSR | D | 82 | Rear suspension |
| 37 | LMGTE | 80 | (Italy) Ebimotors | (Italy) Fabio Babini (Italy) Gianluca Giraudi (Italy) Riccardo Pera | Porsche 4.0 L Flat-6 | D | 82 | Rear suspension |
| 38 | LMP2 | 30 | (Spain) AVF by Adrián Vallés | (Portugal) Henrique Chaves (Russia) Konstantin Tereschenko | Dallara P217 | D | 68 | Accident |
| 38 | LMP2 | 30 | (Spain) AVF by Adrián Vallés | (Portugal) Henrique Chaves (Russia) Konstantin Tereschenko | Gibson GK428 4.2 L V8 | D | 68 | Accident |
| 39 | LMP2 | 29 | (France) Duqueine Engineering | (France) Nico Jamin (France) Nelson Panciatici (France) Pierre Ragues | Oreca 07 | MI | 52 | Rear suspension |
| 39 | LMP2 | 29 | (France) Duqueine Engineering | (France) Nico Jamin (France) Nelson Panciatici (France) Pierre Ragues | Gibson GK428 4.2 L V8 | MI | 52 | Rear suspension |

European Le Mans Series
| Previous race: 4 Hours of Spa-Francorchamps | 2018 season | Next race: none |
