= 2018 4 Hours of Silverstone =

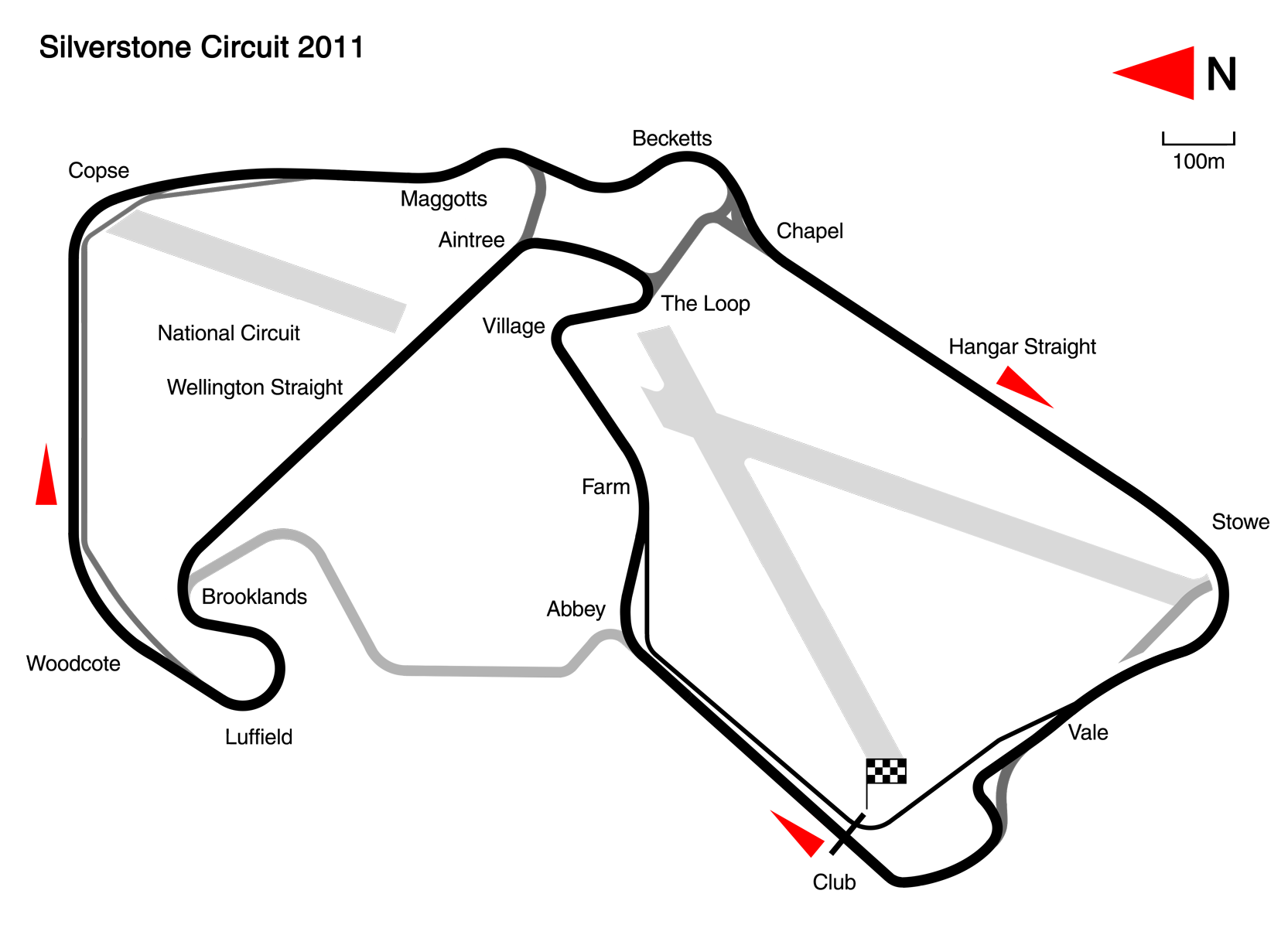
The layout of the Silverstone Circuit, where the race was held.

The 2018 4 Hours of Silverstone was an endurance sportscar racing event held on 18 August 2018 at the Silverstone Circuit. It was the fourth round of the 2018 European Le Mans Series.

== Race ==
=== Race results ===
Class winners are in bold and ‡.

Pos	Class	No	Team	Drivers	Chassis	Tyre	Laps	Time/Retired
Pos	Class	No	Team	Drivers	Engine	Tyre	Laps	Time/Retired
1	**LMP2**	**26**	**(Russia) G-Drive Racing**	**(France) Andrea Pizzitola** **(Russia) Roman Rusinov** **(France) Jean-Éric Vergne**	**Oreca 07**	D	**128**	**4:01:37.859‡**
1	**LMP2**	**26**	**(Russia) G-Drive Racing**	**(France) Andrea Pizzitola** **(Russia) Roman Rusinov** **(France) Jean-Éric Vergne**	**Gibson GK428 4.2 L V8**	D	**128**	**4:01:37.859‡**
2	LMP2	21	(United States) DragonSpeed	(United Kingdom) Ben Hanley (Sweden) Henrik Hedman (France) Nicolas Lapierre	Oreca 07	M	127	+1 Lap
2	LMP2	21	(United States) DragonSpeed	(United Kingdom) Ben Hanley (Sweden) Henrik Hedman (France) Nicolas Lapierre	Gibson GK428 4.2 L V8	M	127	+1 Lap
3	LMP2	28	(France) IDEC Sport	(France) Paul-Loup Chatin (France) Paul Lafargue (Mexico) Memo Rojas	Oreca 07	M	127	+1 Lap
3	LMP2	28	(France) IDEC Sport	(France) Paul-Loup Chatin (France) Paul Lafargue (Mexico) Memo Rojas	Gibson GK428 4.2 L V8	M	127	+1 Lap
4	LMP2	39	(France) Graff	(France) Alexandre Cougnaud (France) Tristan Gommendy (Switzerland) Jonathan Hirschi	Oreca 07	D	127	+1 Lap
4	LMP2	39	(France) Graff	(France) Alexandre Cougnaud (France) Tristan Gommendy (Switzerland) Jonathan Hirschi	Gibson GK428 4.2 L V8	D	127	+1 Lap
5	LMP2	31	(Portugal) APR – Rebellion Racing	(United Kingdom) Ryan Cullen (United States) Gustavo Menezes (United Kingdom) Harrison Newey	Oreca 07	D	127	+1 Lap
5	LMP2	31	(Portugal) APR – Rebellion Racing	(United Kingdom) Ryan Cullen (United States) Gustavo Menezes (United Kingdom) Harrison Newey	Gibson GK428 4.2 L V8	D	127	+1 Lap
6	LMP2	23	(France) Panis Barthez Competition	(France) Timothé Buret (France) Julien Canal (United Kingdom) Will Stevens	Ligier JS P217	M	127	+1 Lap
6	LMP2	23	(France) Panis Barthez Competition	(France) Timothé Buret (France) Julien Canal (United Kingdom) Will Stevens	Gibson GK428 4.2 L V8	M	127	+1 Lap
7	LMP2	29	(France) Duqueine Engineering	(France) Nico Jamin (France) Nelson Panciatici (France) Pierre Ragues	Oreca 07	M	127	+1 Lap
7	LMP2	29	(France) Duqueine Engineering	(France) Nico Jamin (France) Nelson Panciatici (France) Pierre Ragues	Gibson GK428 4.2 L V8	M	127	+1 Lap
8	LMP2	30	(Spain) AVF by Adrián Vallés	(Portugal) Henrique Chaves (Russia) Konstantin Tereschenko	Dallara P217	D	126	+2 Laps
8	LMP2	30	(Spain) AVF by Adrián Vallés	(Portugal) Henrique Chaves (Russia) Konstantin Tereschenko	Gibson GK428 4.2 L V8	D	126	+2 Laps
9	LMP2	49	(Denmark) High Class Racing	(Denmark) Dennis Andersen (Denmark) Anders Fjordbach	Dallara P217	D	126	+2 Laps
9	LMP2	49	(Denmark) High Class Racing	(Denmark) Dennis Andersen (Denmark) Anders Fjordbach	Gibson GK428 4.2 L V8	D	126	+2 Laps
10	LMP2	32	(United States) United Autosports	(United Kingdom) Wayne Boyd (United States) Will Owen (Switzerland) Hugo de Sadeleer	Ligier JS P217	D	125	+3 Laps
10	LMP2	32	(United States) United Autosports	(United Kingdom) Wayne Boyd (United States) Will Owen (Switzerland) Hugo de Sadeleer	Gibson GK428 4.2 L V8	D	125	+3 Laps
11	LMP2	25	(Portugal) Algarve Pro Racing	(Philippines) Ate De Jong (South Korea) Tacksung Kim (United States) Mark Patterson	Ligier JS P217	D	120	+8 Laps
11	LMP2	25	(Portugal) Algarve Pro Racing	(Philippines) Ate De Jong (South Korea) Tacksung Kim (United States) Mark Patterson	Gibson GK428 4.2 L V8	D	120	+8 Laps
12	LMP2	40	(Russia) G-Drive Racing	(Australia) James Allen (Mexico) José Gutiérrez (United Kingdom) Garry Findlay	Oreca 07	D	120	+8 Laps
12	LMP2	40	(Russia) G-Drive Racing	(Australia) James Allen (Mexico) José Gutiérrez (United Kingdom) Garry Findlay	Gibson GK428 4.2 L V8	D	120	+8 Laps
13	**LMP3**	**3**	**(United States) United Autosports**	**(United Kingdom) Matt Bell** **(Canada) Garett Grist** **(United Kingdom) Anthony Wells**	**Ligier JS P3**	M	**117**	**+11 Laps‡**
13	**LMP3**	**3**	**(United States) United Autosports**	**(United Kingdom) Matt Bell** **(Canada) Garett Grist** **(United Kingdom) Anthony Wells**	**Nissan VK50VE 5.0 L V8**	M	**117**	**+11 Laps‡**
14	LMP3	7	(United Kingdom) Ecurie Ecosse/Nielsen	(United Kingdom) Alex Kapadia (United Kingdom) Colin Noble (Norway) Christian Stubbe Olsen	Ligier JS P3	M	117	+11 Laps
14	LMP3	7	(United Kingdom) Ecurie Ecosse/Nielsen	(United Kingdom) Alex Kapadia (United Kingdom) Colin Noble (Norway) Christian Stubbe Olsen	Nissan VK50VE 5.0 L V8	M	117	+11 Laps
15	LMP3	17	(France) Ultimate	(France) François Heriau (France) Matthieu Lahaye (France) Jean-Baptiste Lahaye	Norma M30	M	117	+11 Laps
15	LMP3	17	(France) Ultimate	(France) François Heriau (France) Matthieu Lahaye (France) Jean-Baptiste Lahaye	Nissan VK50VE 5.0 L V8	M	117	+11 Laps
16	LMP3	6	(United Kingdom) 360 Racing	(United Kingdom) Ross Kaiser (United Kingdom) Terrence Woodward (United Kingdom) James Swift	Ligier JS P3	M	117	+11 Laps
16	LMP3	6	(United Kingdom) 360 Racing	(United Kingdom) Ross Kaiser (United Kingdom) Terrence Woodward (United Kingdom) James Swift	Nissan VK50VE 5.0 L V8	M	117	+11 Laps
17	LMP3	13	(Poland) Inter Europol Competition	(Germany) Martin Hippe (Poland) Jakub Śmiechowski	Ligier JS P3	M	116	+12 Laps
17	LMP3	13	(Poland) Inter Europol Competition	(Germany) Martin Hippe (Poland) Jakub Śmiechowski	Nissan VK50VE 5.0 L V8	M	116	+12 Laps
18	LMP3	15	(United Kingdom) RLR MSport	(Canada) John Farano (United Kingdom) Robert Garofall (Netherlands) Job van Uitert	Ligier JS P3	M	116	+12 Laps
18	LMP3	15	(United Kingdom) RLR MSport	(Canada) John Farano (United Kingdom) Robert Garofall (Netherlands) Job van Uitert	Nissan VK50VE 5.0 L V8	M	116	+12 Laps
19	LMP3	2	(United States) United Autosports	(United States) John Falb (United States) Sean Rayhall	Ligier JS P3	M	116	+12 Laps
19	LMP3	2	(United States) United Autosports	(United States) John Falb (United States) Sean Rayhall	Nissan VK50VE 5.0 L V8	M	116	+12 Laps
20	LMP3	19	(France) MRacing – YMR	(Switzerland) David Droux (France) Romano Ricci (Switzerland) Lucas Légeret	Norma M30	M	116	+12 Laps
20	LMP3	19	(France) MRacing – YMR	(Switzerland) David Droux (France) Romano Ricci (Switzerland) Lucas Légeret	Nissan VK50VE 5.0 L V8	M	116	+12 Laps
21	LMP3	9	(Austria) AT Racing	(France) Yann Clairay (Belarus) Alexander Talkanitsa (Belarus) Alexander Talkanitsa Jr.	Ligier JS P3	M	116	+12 Laps
21	LMP3	9	(Austria) AT Racing	(France) Yann Clairay (Belarus) Alexander Talkanitsa (Belarus) Alexander Talkanitsa Jr.	Nissan VK50VE 5.0 L V8	M	116	+12 Laps
22	LMP3	12	(United States) EuroInternational	(Italy) Mattia Drudi (Italy) Andrea Dromedari	Ligier JS P3	M	116	+12 Laps
22	LMP3	12	(United States) EuroInternational	(Italy) Mattia Drudi (Italy) Andrea Dromedari	Nissan VK50VE 5.0 L V8	M	116	+12 Laps
23	LMP3	4	(Switzerland) Cool Racing	(Switzerland) Iradj Alexander (Switzerland) Lucas Borga (Switzerland) Christian Vaglio	Ligier JS P3	M	116	+12 Laps
23	LMP3	4	(Switzerland) Cool Racing	(Switzerland) Iradj Alexander (Switzerland) Lucas Borga (Switzerland) Christian Vaglio	Nissan VK50VE 5.0 L V8	M	116	+12 Laps
24	LMP3	16	(United Kingdom) BHK Motorsport	(Italy) Jacopo Baratto (Italy) Francesco Dracone	Ligier JS P3	M	115	+13 Laps
24	LMP3	16	(United Kingdom) BHK Motorsport	(Italy) Jacopo Baratto (Italy) Francesco Dracone	Nissan VK50VE 5.0 L V8	M	115	+13 Laps
25	**LMGTE**	**66**	**(United Kingdom) JMW Motorsport**	**(United Kingdom) Liam Griffin** **(United Kingdom) Alex MacDowall** **(Spain) Miguel Molina**	**Ferrari 488 GTE**	D	**115**	**+13 Laps‡**
25	**LMGTE**	**66**	**(United Kingdom) JMW Motorsport**	**(United Kingdom) Liam Griffin** **(United Kingdom) Alex MacDowall** **(Spain) Miguel Molina**	**Ferrari F154CB 3.9 L Turbo V8**	D	**115**	**+13 Laps‡**
26	LMGTE	88	(Germany) Proton Competition	(Italy) Matteo Cairoli (Italy) Gianluca Roda (Italy) Giorgio Roda	Porsche 911 RSR	D	115	+13 Laps
26	LMGTE	88	(Germany) Proton Competition	(Italy) Matteo Cairoli (Italy) Gianluca Roda (Italy) Giorgio Roda	Porsche 4.0 L Flat-6	D	115	+13 Laps
27	LMGTE	55	(Switzerland) Spirit of Race	(United Kingdom) Duncan Cameron (Republic of Ireland) Matt Griffin (United Kingdom) Aaron Scott	Ferrari 488 GTE	D	115	+13 Laps
27	LMGTE	55	(Switzerland) Spirit of Race	(United Kingdom) Duncan Cameron (Republic of Ireland) Matt Griffin (United Kingdom) Aaron Scott	Ferrari F154CB 3.9 L Turbo V8	D	115	+13 Laps
28	LMGTE	77	(Germany) Proton Competition	(Germany) Marvin Dienst (Norway) Dennis Olsen (Germany) Christian Ried	Porsche 911 RSR	D	115	+13 Laps
28	LMGTE	77	(Germany) Proton Competition	(Germany) Marvin Dienst (Norway) Dennis Olsen (Germany) Christian Ried	Porsche 4.0 L Flat-6	D	115	+13 Laps
29	LMP3	14	(Poland) Inter Europol Competition	(Germany) Hendrik Still (Italy) Luca Demarchi (Germany) Paul Scheuschner	Ligier JS P3	M	114	+14 Laps
29	LMP3	14	(Poland) Inter Europol Competition	(Germany) Hendrik Still (Italy) Luca Demarchi (Germany) Paul Scheuschner	Nissan VK50VE 5.0 L V8	M	114	+14 Laps
30	LMP3	10	(Italy) Oregon Team	(France) Clément Mateu (Colombia) Andrés Méndez (Italy) Riccardo Ponzio	Norma M30	M	114	+14 Laps
30	LMP3	10	(Italy) Oregon Team	(France) Clément Mateu (Colombia) Andrés Méndez (Italy) Riccardo Ponzio	Nissan VK50VE 5.0 L V8	M	114	+14 Laps
31	LMGTE	86	(United Kingdom) Gulf Racing UK	(United Kingdom) Ben Barker (Australia) Alex Davison (United Kingdom) Michael Wainwright	Porsche 911 RSR	D	114	+14 Laps
31	LMGTE	86	(United Kingdom) Gulf Racing UK	(United Kingdom) Ben Barker (Australia) Alex Davison (United Kingdom) Michael Wainwright	Porsche 4.0 L Flat-6	D	114	+14 Laps
32	LMGTE	83	(United States) Krohn Racing	(Italy) Andrea Bertolini (Sweden) Niclas Jönsson (United States) Tracy Krohn	Ferrari 488 GTE	D	112	+16 Laps
32	LMGTE	83	(United States) Krohn Racing	(Italy) Andrea Bertolini (Sweden) Niclas Jönsson (United States) Tracy Krohn	Ferrari F154CB 3.9 L Turbo V8	D	112	+16 Laps
33	LMP3	34	(Poland) Team Virage	(Sweden) Henning Enqvist (United Kingdom) JM Littman (United Kingdom) Jacob Rattenbury	Ligier JS P3	M	110	+18 Laps
33	LMP3	34	(Poland) Team Virage	(Sweden) Henning Enqvist (United Kingdom) JM Littman (United Kingdom) Jacob Rattenbury	Nissan VK50VE 5.0 L V8	M	110	+18 Laps
34	LMP3	11	(United States) EuroInternational	(Netherlands) Kay van Berlo (Italy) Giorgio Mondini	Ligier JS P3	M	103	+25 Laps
34	LMP3	11	(United States) EuroInternational	(Netherlands) Kay van Berlo (Italy) Giorgio Mondini	Nissan VK50VE 5.0 L V8	M	103	+25 Laps
35	LMP2	47	(Italy) Cetilar Villorba Corse	(Italy) Roberto Lacorte (Brazil) Felipe Nasr (Italy) Giorgio Sernagiotto	Dallara P217	D	98	+30 Laps
35	LMP2	47	(Italy) Cetilar Villorba Corse	(Italy) Roberto Lacorte (Brazil) Felipe Nasr (Italy) Giorgio Sernagiotto	Gibson GK428 4.2 L V8	D	98	+30 Laps
36	LMGTE	80	(Italy) Ebimotors	(Italy) Fabio Babini (United States) Bret Curtis (Italy) Riccardo Pera	Porsche 911 RSR	D	112	Not classified
36	LMGTE	80	(Italy) Ebimotors	(Italy) Fabio Babini (United States) Bret Curtis (Italy) Riccardo Pera	Porsche 4.0 L Flat-6	D	112	Not classified
37	LMP2	24	(Spain) Racing Engineering	(France) Norman Nato (France) Paul Petit (France) Matthieu Vaxivière	Oreca 07	D	110	Brake failure
37	LMP2	24	(Spain) Racing Engineering	(France) Norman Nato (France) Paul Petit (France) Matthieu Vaxivière	Gibson GK428 4.2 L V8	D	110	Brake failure
38	LMP3	5	(Spain) NEFIS by Speed Factory	(Russia) Timur Boguslavskiy (Ukraine) Aleksey Chuklin (Russia) Daniil Pronenko	Ligier JS P3	M	84	Not classified
38	LMP3	5	(Spain) NEFIS by Speed Factory	(Russia) Timur Boguslavskiy (Ukraine) Aleksey Chuklin (Russia) Daniil Pronenko	Nissan VK50VE 5.0 L V8	M	84	Not classified
39	LMP3	18	(France) MRacing – YMR	(France) Natan Bihel (France) Laurent Millara	Ligier JS P3	M	61	Not classified
39	LMP3	18	(France) MRacing – YMR	(France) Natan Bihel (France) Laurent Millara	Nissan VK50VE 5.0 L V8	M	61	Not classified
40	LMP2	35	(Russia) SMP Racing	(Russia) Matevos Isaakyan (Russia) Viktor Shaytar	Dallara P217	D	35	Brake failure
40	LMP2	35	(Russia) SMP Racing	(Russia) Matevos Isaakyan (Russia) Viktor Shaytar	Gibson GK428 4.2 L V8	D	35	Brake failure
41	LMP2	22	(United States) United Autosports	(Portugal) Filipe Albuquerque (United Kingdom) Phil Hanson	Ligier JS P217	D	34	Electrical
41	LMP2	22	(United States) United Autosports	(Portugal) Filipe Albuquerque (United Kingdom) Phil Hanson	Gibson GK428 4.2 L V8	D	34	Electrical

European Le Mans Series
Previous race: 4 Hours of Red Bull Ring	2018 season	Next race: 4 Hours of Spa-Francorchamps
