= 2018 European Le Mans Series =

2018 car racing season

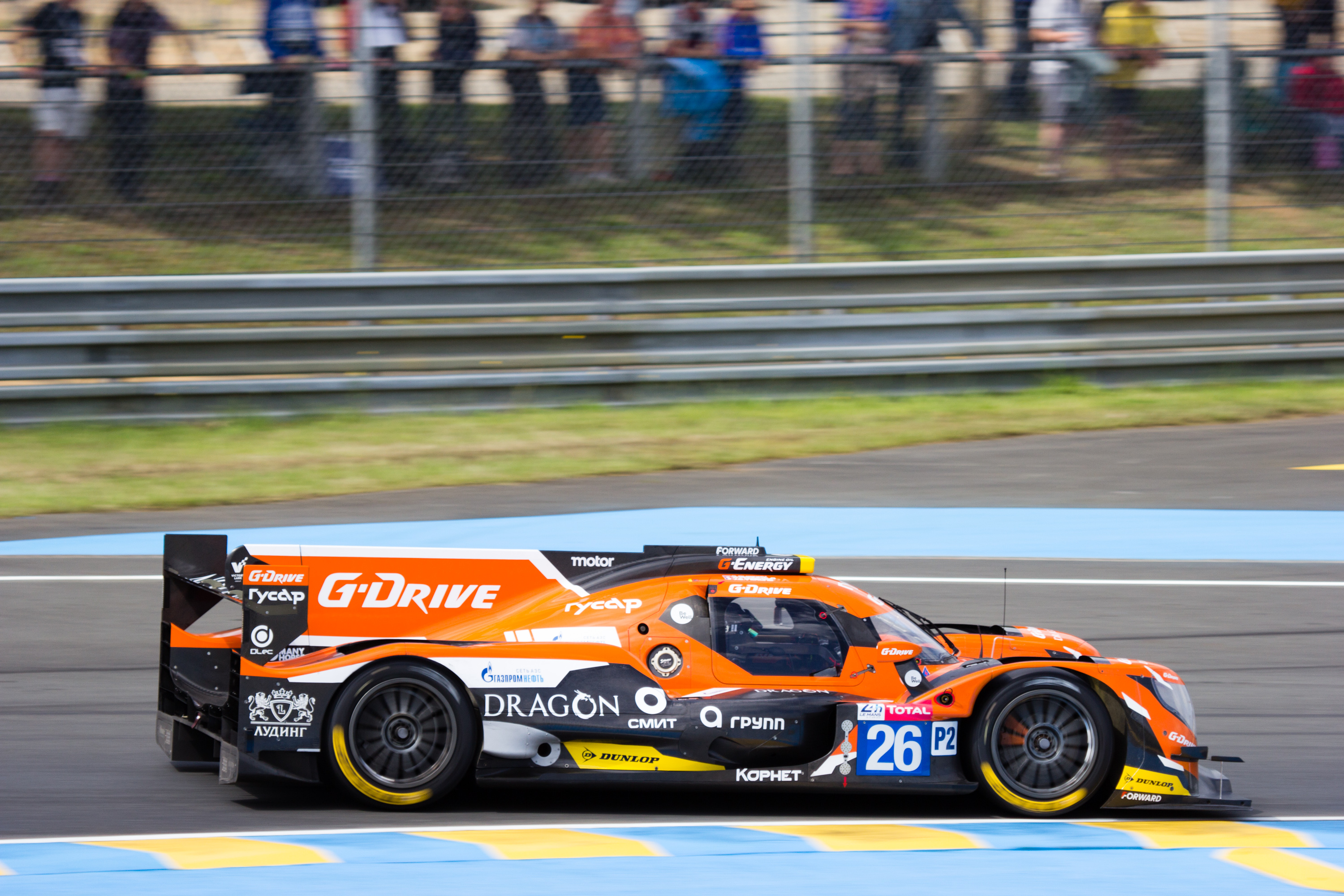
G-Drive Racing No. 26 Oreca 07, winner of the 2018 European Le Mans Series in the LMP2 class

The 2018 European Le Mans Series was the fifteenth season of the Automobile Club de l'Ouest's (ACO) European Le Mans Series. The six-event season began at Circuit Paul Ricard on 15 April and finished at Algarve International Circuit on 28 October. The series is open to Le Mans Prototypes, divided into the LMP2 and LMP3 classes, and grand tourer-style racing cars in the LMGTE class.

== Calendar ==
The provisional 2018 calendar was announced on 23 September 2017. The calendar comprises six events, featuring the same six circuits that hosted events in the 2017 season. The rounds at Silverstone and Paul Ricard swapped their places in the calendar, with the French circuit hosting the opening round and Silverstone moving to an August date, once again in conjunction with the FIA World Endurance Championship.

The official pre-season test also returned to Paul Ricard after a one-year absence, having taken place at Autodromo Nazionale di Monza in 2017.

Rnd	Race	Circuit	Location	Date
1	4 Hours of Le Castellet	(France) Circuit Paul Ricard	Le Castellet, France	15 April
2	4 Hours of Monza	(Italy) Autodromo Nazionale di Monza	Monza, Italy	13 May
3	4 Hours of Red Bull Ring	(Austria) Red Bull Ring	Spielberg, Austria	22 July
4	4 Hours of Silverstone	(United Kingdom) Silverstone Circuit	Silverstone, United Kingdom	18 August
5	4 Hours of Spa	(Belgium) Circuit de Spa-Francorchamps	Spa, Belgium	23 September
6	4 Hours of Portimão	(Portugal) Algarve International Circuit	Portimão, Portugal	28 October

== Entries ==
=== LMP2 ===
In accordance with the 2017 LMP2 regulations, all cars in the LMP2 class used the Gibson GK428 V8 engine.

Entrant/Team	Chassis	Tyre	No.	Drivers	Rounds
(United States) DragonSpeed	Oreca 07	MI	21	(United Kingdom) Ben Hanley	All
(United States) DragonSpeed	Oreca 07	MI	21	(Sweden) Henrik Hedman	All
(United States) DragonSpeed	Oreca 07	MI	21	(France) Nicolas Lapierre	All
(United States) United Autosports	Ligier JS P217	D MI (Note: Both United Autosports LMP2 entries switched to Michelin tyres from the fifth round onwards.)	22	(United Kingdom) Phil Hanson	All
(United States) United Autosports	Ligier JS P217	D MI	22	(Brazil) Bruno Senna	1
(United States) United Autosports	Ligier JS P217	D MI	22	(Portugal) Filipe Albuquerque	2–6
(United States) United Autosports	Ligier JS P217	D MI	32	(United Kingdom) Wayne Boyd	All
(United States) United Autosports	Ligier JS P217	D MI	32	(United States) William Owen	All
(United States) United Autosports	Ligier JS P217	D MI	32	(Switzerland) Hugo de Sadeleer	All
(France) Panis Barthez Competition	Ligier JS P217	MI	23	(France) Timothé Buret	All
(France) Panis Barthez Competition	Ligier JS P217	MI	23	(France) Julien Canal	All
(France) Panis Barthez Competition	Ligier JS P217	MI	23	(United Kingdom) Will Stevens	All
(Spain) Racing Engineering	Oreca 07	D	24	(France) Norman Nato	All
(Spain) Racing Engineering	Oreca 07	D	24	(France) Paul Petit	All
(Spain) Racing Engineering	Oreca 07	D	24	(France) Olivier Pla	1–3, 5–6
(Spain) Racing Engineering	Oreca 07	D	24	(France) Matthieu Vaxivière	4
(Portugal) / Algarve Pro Racing (Note: Car No. 25 entered as Algarve Pro Racing and car No. 31 entered as APR - Rebellion Racing.); (Portugal) / APR - Rebellion Racing	Ligier JS P217	D	25	(South Korea) Tacksung Kim	All
(Portugal) / Algarve Pro Racing; (Portugal) / APR - Rebellion Racing	Ligier JS P217	D	25	(United States) Mark Patterson	All
(Portugal) / Algarve Pro Racing; (Portugal) / APR - Rebellion Racing	Ligier JS P217	D	25	(Netherlands) Ate De Jong	1–4, 6
(Portugal) / Algarve Pro Racing; (Portugal) / APR - Rebellion Racing	Ligier JS P217	D	25	(United States) Matt McMurry	5
(Portugal) / Algarve Pro Racing; (Portugal) / APR - Rebellion Racing	Oreca 07	D	31	(Republic of Ireland) Ryan Cullen	All
(Portugal) / Algarve Pro Racing; (Portugal) / APR - Rebellion Racing	Oreca 07	D	31	(United States) Gustavo Menezes	All
(Portugal) / Algarve Pro Racing; (Portugal) / APR - Rebellion Racing	Oreca 07	D	31	(United Kingdom) Harrison Newey	All
(Russia) G-Drive Racing (Note: Car No. 26 entered as G-Drive Racing and car No. 33 entered as TDS Racing.) (France) TDS Racing	Oreca 07	D	26	(France) Andrea Pizzitola	All
(Russia) G-Drive Racing (France) TDS Racing	Oreca 07	D	26	(Russia) Roman Rusinov	All
(Russia) G-Drive Racing (France) TDS Racing	Oreca 07	D	26	(Switzerland) Alexandre Imperatori	1
(Russia) G-Drive Racing (France) TDS Racing	Oreca 07	D	26	(France) Jean-Éric Vergne	2–6
(Russia) G-Drive Racing (France) TDS Racing	Oreca 07	D	33	(France) Loïc Duval	1–3
(Russia) G-Drive Racing (France) TDS Racing	Oreca 07	D	33	(France) François Perrodo	1–3
(Russia) G-Drive Racing (France) TDS Racing	Oreca 07	D	33	(France) Matthieu Vaxivière	1–3
(France) IDEC Sport	Ligier JS P217	MI	27	(France) Patrice Lafargue	1–3
(France) IDEC Sport	Ligier JS P217	MI	27	(France) Erik Maris	1–3, 5
(France) IDEC Sport	Ligier JS P217	MI	27	(France) William Cavailhes	1–2
(France) IDEC Sport	Ligier JS P217	MI	27	(France) Nicolas Minassian	3, 5
(France) IDEC Sport	Ligier JS P217	MI	27	(France) Aurélien Panis	5
(France) IDEC Sport	Oreca 07	MI	28	(France) Paul-Loup Chatin	All
(France) IDEC Sport	Oreca 07	MI	28	(France) Paul Lafargue	1–4
(France) IDEC Sport	Oreca 07	MI	28	(Mexico) Memo Rojas	All
(France) IDEC Sport	Oreca 07	MI	28	(France) Gabriel Aubry	5–6
(France) Duqueine Engineering	Oreca 07	MI	29	(France) Nico Jamin	All
(France) Duqueine Engineering	Oreca 07	MI	29	(France) Nelson Panciatici	All
(France) Duqueine Engineering	Oreca 07	MI	29	(France) Pierre Ragues	All
(Spain) AVF by Adrián Vallés	Dallara P217	D	30	(Portugal) Henrique Chaves	All
(Spain) AVF by Adrián Vallés	Dallara P217	D	30	(Russia) Konstantin Tereshchenko	All
(Russia) SMP Racing	Dallara P217	D	35	(Russia) Matevos Isaakyan	1–4
(Russia) SMP Racing	Dallara P217	D	35	(Russia) Egor Orudzhev	1–3
(Russia) SMP Racing	Dallara P217	D	35	(Russia) Viktor Shaytar	1–4
(France) Signatech Alpine Matmut	Alpine A470	D	36	(Brazil) André Negrão	1
(France) Signatech Alpine Matmut	Alpine A470	D	36	(France) Pierre Thiriet	1
(France) Graff (Note: Car No. 39 entered as Graff and car No. 40 entered as G-Drive Racing.) (Russia) G-Drive Racing	Oreca 07	D	39	(France) Alexandre Cougnaud	All
(France) Graff (Russia) G-Drive Racing	Oreca 07	D	39	(France) Tristan Gommendy	All
(France) Graff (Russia) G-Drive Racing	Oreca 07	D	39	(Switzerland) Jonathan Hirschi	All
(France) Graff (Russia) G-Drive Racing	Oreca 07	D	40	(Australia) James Allen	All
(France) Graff (Russia) G-Drive Racing	Oreca 07	D	40	(Mexico) José Gutiérrez	1–4
(France) Graff (Russia) G-Drive Racing	Oreca 07	D	40	(France) Enzo Guibbert	1–2
(France) Graff (Russia) G-Drive Racing	Oreca 07	D	40	(United Kingdom) Garry Findlay	4
(France) Graff (Russia) G-Drive Racing	Oreca 07	D	40	(Sweden) Henning Enqvist	5–6
(France) Graff (Russia) G-Drive Racing	Oreca 07	D	40	(France) Julien Falchero	5–6
(Italy) Cetilar Villorba Corse	Dallara P217	D	47	(Italy) Roberto Lacorte	All
(Italy) Cetilar Villorba Corse	Dallara P217	D	47	(Italy) Giorgio Sernagiotto	All
(Italy) Cetilar Villorba Corse	Dallara P217	D	47	(Italy) Andrea Belicchi	1
(Italy) Cetilar Villorba Corse	Dallara P217	D	47	(Brazil) Felipe Nasr	2–6
(Denmark) High Class Racing	Dallara P217	D	49	(Denmark) Dennis Andersen	All
(Denmark) High Class Racing	Dallara P217	D	49	(Denmark) Anders Fjordbach	All

=== LMP3 ===
All cars in the LMP3 class used the Nissan VK50VE 5.0 L V8 engine and Michelin tyres.

Entrant/Team	Chassis	No.	Drivers	Rounds
(United States) United Autosports	Ligier JS P3	2	(United States) John Falb	All
(United States) United Autosports	Ligier JS P3	2	(United States) Sean Rayhall	1–4
(United States) United Autosports	Ligier JS P3	2	(Australia) Scott Andrews	5–6
(United States) United Autosports	Ligier JS P3	3	(United Kingdom) Matthew Bell	All
(United States) United Autosports	Ligier JS P3	3	(Canada) Garett Grist	All
(United States) United Autosports	Ligier JS P3	3	(United Kingdom) Anthony Wells	All
(Switzerland) Cool Racing	Ligier JS P3	4	(Switzerland) Iradj Alexander	1–4, 6
(Switzerland) Cool Racing	Ligier JS P3	4	(Switzerland) Antonin Borga	1–3, 5–6
(Switzerland) Cool Racing	Ligier JS P3	4	(Switzerland) Alexandre Coigny	1–3, 5–6
(Switzerland) Cool Racing	Ligier JS P3	4	(Switzerland) Lucas Borga	4
(Switzerland) Cool Racing	Ligier JS P3	4	(Switzerland) Christian Vaglio	4
(Spain) NEFIS By Speed Factory	Ligier JS P3	5	(Russia) Timur Boguslavskiy	All
(Spain) NEFIS By Speed Factory	Ligier JS P3	5	(Ukraine) Aleksey Chuklin	All
(Spain) NEFIS By Speed Factory	Ligier JS P3	5	(Russia) Daniil Pronenko	All
(United Kingdom) 360 Racing	Ligier JS P3	6	(United Kingdom) Ross Kaiser	All
(United Kingdom) 360 Racing	Ligier JS P3	6	(United Kingdom) Terrence Woodward	All
(United Kingdom) 360 Racing	Ligier JS P3	6	(United Kingdom) James Swift	1–2, 4
(United Kingdom) Ecurie Ecosse/Nielsen	Ligier JS P3	7	(United Kingdom) Alex Kapadia	All
(United Kingdom) Ecurie Ecosse/Nielsen	Ligier JS P3	7	(United Kingdom) Colin Noble	All
(United Kingdom) Ecurie Ecosse/Nielsen	Ligier JS P3	7	(Denmark) Christian Stubbe Olsen	All
(Luxembourg) DKR Engineering	Norma M30	8	(Belgium) Jean Glorieux	1–2
(Luxembourg) DKR Engineering	Norma M30	8	(Spain) Alexander Toril	1–2
(Luxembourg) DKR Engineering	Norma M30	8	(Spain) Miguel Toril	1–2
(Luxembourg) DKR Engineering	Norma M30	8	(Sweden) Henning Enqvist	3
(Luxembourg) DKR Engineering	Norma M30	8	(France) Fabien Lavergne	3
(Luxembourg) DKR Engineering	Norma M30	8	(Mexico) Ricardo Sanchez	3
(Luxembourg) DKR Engineering	Norma M30	8	(France) Marvin Klein	5–6
(Luxembourg) DKR Engineering	Norma M30	8	(Switzerland) Christian Vaglio	5–6
(Luxembourg) DKR Engineering	Norma M30	8	(Switzerland) Nicolas Maulini	6
(Austria) AT Racing	Ligier JS P3	9	(Belarus) Alexander Talkanitsa Jr.	All
(Austria) AT Racing	Ligier JS P3	9	(Belarus) Alexander Talkanitsa Sr.	All
(Austria) AT Racing	Ligier JS P3	9	(France) Yann Clairay	1, 4–5
(Austria) AT Racing	Ligier JS P3	9	(Denmark) Mikkel Jensen	2–3, 6
(Italy) Oregon Team	Norma M30	10	(France) Clément Mateu	All
(Italy) Oregon Team	Norma M30	10	(Colombia) Andrés Méndez	All
(Italy) Oregon Team	Norma M30	10	(Italy) Riccardo Ponzio	All
(United States) Eurointernational	Ligier JS P3	11	(Italy) Giorgio Mondini	All
(United States) Eurointernational	Ligier JS P3	11	(Netherlands) Kay van Berlo	All
(United States) Eurointernational	Ligier JS P3	11	(Italy) Mattia Drudi	5
(United States) Eurointernational	Ligier JS P3	12	(Italy) Andrea Dromedari	1–5
(United States) Eurointernational	Ligier JS P3	12	(United States) Max Hanratty	1–3
(United States) Eurointernational	Ligier JS P3	12	(Canada) James Dayson	1, 3, 5–6
(United States) Eurointernational	Ligier JS P3	12	(United States) Mark Kvamme	2
(United States) Eurointernational	Ligier JS P3	12	(Italy) Mattia Drudi	4
(United States) Eurointernational	Ligier JS P3	12	(Russia) Vadim Meshcheriakov	6
(United States) Eurointernational	Ligier JS P3	12	(Italy) Luca Demarchi	6
(Poland) Inter Europol Competition	Ligier JS P3	13	(Germany) Martin Hippe	All
(Poland) Inter Europol Competition	Ligier JS P3	13	(Poland) Jakub Śmiechowski	All
(Poland) Inter Europol Competition	Ligier JS P3	14	(Italy) Luca Demarchi	1–5
(Poland) Inter Europol Competition	Ligier JS P3	14	(Germany) Paul Scheuschner	All
(Poland) Inter Europol Competition	Ligier JS P3	14	(Sweden) Henning Enqvist	1
(Poland) Inter Europol Competition	Ligier JS P3	14	(Germany) Hendrik Still	2, 4
(Poland) Inter Europol Competition	Ligier JS P3	14	(Italy) Guglielmo Belotti	3
(Poland) Inter Europol Competition	Ligier JS P3	14	(Switzerland) Moritz Müller-Crepon	5–6
(United Kingdom) RLR MSport	Ligier JS P3	15	(Canada) John Farano	All
(United Kingdom) RLR MSport	Ligier JS P3	15	(United Kingdom) Rob Garofall	All
(United Kingdom) RLR MSport	Ligier JS P3	15	(Netherlands) Job van Uitert	All
(United Kingdom) BHK Motorsport	Ligier JS P3	16	(Italy) Jacopo Baratto	All
(United Kingdom) BHK Motorsport	Ligier JS P3	16	(Italy) Francesco Dracone	All
(France) Ultimate	Norma M30	17	(France) François Hériau	All
(France) Ultimate	Norma M30	17	(France) Jean-Baptiste Lahaye	All
(France) Ultimate	Norma M30	17	(France) Matthieu Lahaye	All
(France) M.Racing - YMR	Ligier JS P3	18	(France) Natan Bihel	All
(France) M.Racing - YMR	Ligier JS P3	18	(France) Laurent Millara	All
(France) M.Racing - YMR	Norma M30	19	(Switzerland) David Droux	All
(France) M.Racing - YMR	Norma M30	19	(Switzerland) Lucas Légeret	All
(France) M.Racing - YMR	Norma M30	19	(France) Nicolas Ferrer	1–2
(France) M.Racing - YMR	Norma M30	19	(France) Alain Ferté	3
(France) M.Racing - YMR	Norma M30	19	(France) Romano Ricci	4–5
(France) M.Racing - YMR	Norma M30	19	(United Kingdom) Michael Benham	6
Racing For Poland	Ligier JS P3	20	(Poland) Tomasz Blicharski	2
Racing For Poland	Ligier JS P3	20	(Sweden) Henning Enqvist	2
Racing For Poland	Ligier JS P3	20	(Switzerland) Alex Fontana	2
(Poland) Team Virage	Ligier JS P3	34	(Sweden) Henning Enqvist	4
(Poland) Team Virage	Ligier JS P3	34	(United Kingdom) JM Littman	4
(Poland) Team Virage	Ligier JS P3	34	(United Kingdom) Jacob Rattenbury	4

=== LMGTE ===
All cars in the LMGTE class used Dunlop tyres.

Entrant/Team	Chassis	Engine	No.	Drivers	Rounds
(Switzerland) Spirit of Race (Note: Cars No. 54 and 55 entered as Spirit of Race and car No. 83 entered as Krohn Racing.) (United States) Krohn Racing	Ferrari 488 GTE	Ferrari F154CB 4.0 L Turbo V8	54	(Italy) Francesco Castellacci	1
(Switzerland) Spirit of Race (United States) Krohn Racing	Ferrari 488 GTE	Ferrari F154CB 4.0 L Turbo V8	54	(Switzerland) Thomas Flohr	1
(Switzerland) Spirit of Race (United States) Krohn Racing	Ferrari 488 GTE	Ferrari F154CB 4.0 L Turbo V8	55	(United Kingdom) Duncan Cameron	All
(Switzerland) Spirit of Race (United States) Krohn Racing	Ferrari 488 GTE	Ferrari F154CB 4.0 L Turbo V8	55	(Republic of Ireland) Matt Griffin	All
(Switzerland) Spirit of Race (United States) Krohn Racing	Ferrari 488 GTE	Ferrari F154CB 4.0 L Turbo V8	55	(United Kingdom) Aaron Scott	All
(Switzerland) Spirit of Race (United States) Krohn Racing	Ferrari 488 GTE	Ferrari F154CB 4.0 L Turbo V8	83	(Italy) Andrea Bertolini	All
(Switzerland) Spirit of Race (United States) Krohn Racing	Ferrari 488 GTE	Ferrari F154CB 4.0 L Turbo V8	83	(Sweden) Niclas Jönsson	All
(Switzerland) Spirit of Race (United States) Krohn Racing	Ferrari 488 GTE	Ferrari F154CB 4.0 L Turbo V8	83	(United States) Tracy Krohn	All
(United Kingdom) JMW Motorsport	Ferrari 488 GTE	Ferrari F154CB 4.0 L Turbo V8	66	(United Kingdom) Liam Griffin	All
(United Kingdom) JMW Motorsport	Ferrari 488 GTE	Ferrari F154CB 4.0 L Turbo V8	66	(United Kingdom) Alex MacDowall	All
(United Kingdom) JMW Motorsport	Ferrari 488 GTE	Ferrari F154CB 4.0 L Turbo V8	66	(Spain) Miguel Molina	All
(Germany) Proton Competition	Porsche 911 RSR	Porsche M97/80 4.0 L Flat-6	77	(Germany) Marvin Dienst	All
(Germany) Proton Competition	Porsche 911 RSR	Porsche M97/80 4.0 L Flat-6	77	(Germany) Christian Ried	All
(Germany) Proton Competition	Porsche 911 RSR	Porsche M97/80 4.0 L Flat-6	77	(Norway) Dennis Olsen	1, 3–6
(Germany) Proton Competition	Porsche 911 RSR	Porsche M97/80 4.0 L Flat-6	77	(Germany) Marc Lieb	2
(Germany) Proton Competition	Porsche 911 RSR	Porsche M97/80 4.0 L Flat-6	88	(Italy) Gianluca Roda	All
(Germany) Proton Competition	Porsche 911 RSR	Porsche M97/80 4.0 L Flat-6	88	(Italy) Giorgio Roda	All
(Germany) Proton Competition	Porsche 911 RSR	Porsche M97/80 4.0 L Flat-6	88	(Italy) Matteo Cairoli	1, 3–6
(Germany) Proton Competition	Porsche 911 RSR	Porsche M97/80 4.0 L Flat-6	88	(Italy) Gianmaria Bruni	2
(Italy) EbiMotors	Porsche 911 RSR	Porsche M97/80 4.0 L Flat-6	80	(Italy) Fabio Babini	All
(Italy) EbiMotors	Porsche 911 RSR	Porsche M97/80 4.0 L Flat-6	80	(Italy) Riccardo Pera	All
(Italy) EbiMotors	Porsche 911 RSR	Porsche M97/80 4.0 L Flat-6	80	(France) Raymond Narac	1–2
(Italy) EbiMotors	Porsche 911 RSR	Porsche M97/80 4.0 L Flat-6	80	(United States) Bret Curtis	3–5
(Italy) EbiMotors	Porsche 911 RSR	Porsche M97/80 4.0 L Flat-6	80	(Italy) Gianluca Giraudi	6
(United Kingdom) Gulf Racing UK	Porsche 911 RSR	Porsche M97/80 4.0 L Flat-6	86	(United Kingdom) Ben Barker	1, 4
(United Kingdom) Gulf Racing UK	Porsche 911 RSR	Porsche M97/80 4.0 L Flat-6	86	(Australia) Alex Davison	1, 4
(United Kingdom) Gulf Racing UK	Porsche 911 RSR	Porsche M97/80 4.0 L Flat-6	86	(United Kingdom) Michael Wainwright	1, 4

== Results and standings ==
Bold indicates overall winner.

Rnd.	Circuit	LMP2 Winning Team	LMP3 Winning Team	LMGTE Winning Team	Results
Rnd.	Circuit	LMP2 Winning Drivers	LMP3 Winning Drivers	LMGTE Winning Drivers	Results
1	Le Castellet	**(Spain) No. 24 Racing Engineering**	(United Kingdom) No. 15 RLR MSport	(United Kingdom) No. 66 JMW Motorsport	Report
1	Le Castellet	**(France) Norman Nato** **(France) Paul Petit** **(France) Olivier Pla**	(Canada) John Farano (United Kingdom) Rob Garofall (Netherlands) Job van Uitert	(United Kingdom) Liam Griffin (United Kingdom) Alex MacDowall (Spain) Miguel Molina	Report
2	Monza	**(Russia) No. 26 G-Drive Racing**	(United States) No. 11 EuroInternational	(Switzerland) No. 55 Spirit of Race	Report
2	Monza	**(France) Andrea Pizzitola** **(Russia) Roman Rusinov** **(France) Jean-Éric Vergne**	(Italy) Giorgio Mondini (Netherlands) Kay van Berlo	(United Kingdom) Duncan Cameron (Republic of Ireland) Matt Griffin (United Kingdom) Aaron Scott	Report
3	Red Bull Ring	**(Russia) No. 26 G-Drive Racing**	(United Kingdom) No. 15 RLR MSport	(Germany) No. 88 Proton Competition	Report
3	Red Bull Ring	**(France) Andrea Pizzitola** **(Russia) Roman Rusinov** **(France) Jean-Éric Vergne**	(Canada) John Farano (United Kingdom) Rob Garofall (Netherlands) Job van Uitert	(Italy) Matteo Cairoli (Italy) Gianluca Roda (Italy) Giorgio Roda	Report
4	Silverstone	**(Russia) No. 26 G-Drive Racing**	(United States) No. 3 United Autosports	(United Kingdom) No. 66 JMW Motorsport	Report
4	Silverstone	**(France) Andrea Pizzitola** **(Russia) Roman Rusinov** **(France) Jean-Éric Vergne**	(United Kingdom) Matthew Bell (Canada) Garett Grist (United Kingdom) Anthony Wells	(United Kingdom) Liam Griffin (United Kingdom) Alex MacDowall (Spain) Miguel Molina	Report
5	Spa-Francorchamps	**(United States) No. 22 United Autosports**	(United States) No. 2 United Autosports	(Italy) No. 80 EbiMotors	Report
5	Spa-Francorchamps	**(Portugal) Filipe Albuquerque** **(United Kingdom) Phil Hanson**	(Australia) Scott Andrews (United States) John Falb	(Italy) Fabio Babini (United States) Bret Curtis (Italy) Riccardo Pera	Report
6	Portimão	**(United States) No. 22 United Autosports**	(Poland) No. 13 Inter Europol Competition	(Germany) No. 77 Proton Competition	Report
6	Portimão	**(Portugal) Filipe Albuquerque** **(United Kingdom) Phil Hanson**	(Germany) Martin Hippe (Poland) Jakub Śmiechowski	(Germany) Marvin Dienst (Norway) Dennis Olsen (Germany) Christian Ried	Report

To be classified a car will have to cross the finish line on the race track when the chequered flag is shown, except in a case of force majeure at the Stewards’ discretion and have covered at least 70% (the official number of laps will be rounded down to the nearest whole number) of the distance covered by the car classified in first place in the overall classification.

== Teams Championships ==
Points are awarded according to the following structure:

Position	**1st**	**2nd**	**3rd**	**4th**	**5th**	**6th**	**7th**	**8th**	**9th**	**10th**	Other	**Pole**
Points	25	18	15	12	10	8	6	4	2	1	0.5	1

=== LMP2 Teams Championship ===
Pos.	Team	Car	LEC (France)	MNZ (Italy)	RBR (Austria)	SIL (United Kingdom)	SPA (Note: The 4 Hours of Spa was red-flagged after 40 laps. As less than 75% of the race had passed at the time of suspension, half points were awarded to all classified finishers.) (Belgium)	POR (Portugal)	Total
1	(Russia) #26 G-Drive Racing	Oreca 07	4	1	1	1	**12**	4	100.25
2	(Spain) #24 Racing Engineering	Oreca 07	1	5	2	Ret	7	5	66
3	(France) #28 IDEC Sport	Oreca 07	**7**	3	**4**	3	4	6	64
4	(United States) #22 United Autosports	Ligier JS P217	12	10	3	Ret	1	1	54
5	(United States) #21 DragonSpeed	Oreca 07	Ret	**4**	5	2	2	13	50.5
6	(France) #23 Panis Barthez Competition	Ligier JS P217	8	7	10	**6**	3	2	45.5
7	(France) #33 TDS Racing	Oreca 07	2	2	9				38
8	(France) #29 Duqueine Engineering	Oreca 07	3	6	DSQ	7	5	**Ret**	35
9	(Portugal) #31 APR - Rebellion Racing	Oreca 07	15	8	6	5	15	12	23.25
10	(United States) #32 United Autosports	Ligier JS P217	9	11	15	10	6	3	23
11	(France) #39 Graff	Oreca 07	10	Ret	8	4	8	8	23
12	(Russia) #40 G-Drive Racing	Oreca 07	6	Ret	13	12	11	7	15.25
13	(France) #36 Signatech Alpine Matmut	Alpine A470	5						10
14	(Russia) #35 SMP Racing	Dallara P217	NC	Ret	7	Ret			6
15	(Spain) #30 AVF by Adrián Vallés	Dallara P217	11	Ret	14	8	9	Ret	6
16	(Denmark) #49 High Class Racing	Dallara P217	13	14	12	9	Ret	9	5.5
17	(Italy) #47 Cetilar Villorba Corse	Dallara P217	14	9	11	13	10	11	4.5
18	(Portugal) #25 Algarve Pro Racing	Ligier JS P217	16	13	17	11	13	10	3.25
19	(France) #27 IDEC Sport	Ligier JS P217	Ret	12	16		14		1.25
Pos.	Driver	Team	LEC (France)	MNZ (Italy)	RBR (Austria)	SIL (United Kingdom)	SPA (Belgium)	POR (Portugal)	Points

Key
Colour	Result
Gold	Race winner
Silver	2nd place
Bronze	3rd place
Green	Points finish
Blue	Non-points finish
Blue	Non-classified finish (NC)
Purple	Did not finish (Ret)
Black	Disqualified (DSQ)
Black	Excluded (EX)
White	Did not start (DNS)
White	Race cancelled (C)
White	Withdrew (WD)
Blank	Did not participate

**Bold** – Pole
Italics – Fastest Lap

=== LMP3 Teams Championship ===
Pos.	Team	Car	LEC (France)	MNZ (Italy)	RBR (Austria)	SIL (United Kingdom)	SPA (Belgium)	POR (Portugal)	Total
1	(United Kingdom) #15 RLR MSport	Ligier JS P3	1	11	1	6	2	5	77.5
2	(Poland) #13 Inter Europol Competition	Ligier JS P3	6	4	3	5	12	1	70.25
3	(United States) #3 United Autosports	Ligier JS P3	7	3	12	1	4	7	58.5
4	(United Kingdom) #7 Ecurie Ecosse/Nielsen	Ligier JS P3	9	10	2	2	9	2	58
5	(United Kingdom) #6 360 Racing	Ligier JS P3	4	2	8	4	3	16	54
6	(United States) #2 United Autosports	Ligier JS P3	5	5	Ret	7	1	3	53.5
7	(United States) #11 EuroInternational	Ligier JS P3	3	1	7	16	13	Ret	46.75
8	(France) #17 Ultimate	Norma M30	Ret	**7**	**4**	3	**Ret**	12	36.5
9	(Spain) #5 NEFIS By Speed Factory	Ligier JS P3	16	6	6	Ret	10	4	29
10	(France) #19 M.Racing - YMR	Norma M30	**2**	13	Ret	8	8	**10**	27.5
11	(Austria) #9 AT Racing	Ligier JS P3	8	Ret	5	9	Ret	6	24
12	(Italy) #10 Oregon Team	Norma M30	11	8	16	14	7	15	9
13	(Switzerland) #4 Cool Racing	Ligier JS P3	10	9	10	11	6	13	9
14	(France) #18 M.Racing - YMR	Ligier JS P3	13	Ret	9	Ret	5	17	8
15	(Poland) #14 Inter Europol Competition	Ligier JS P3	12	15	11	13	15	8	6.25
16	(United States) #12 EuroInternational	Ligier JS P3	14	DNS	13	**10**	14	14	3.75
17	(Luxembourg) #8 DKR Engineering	Norma M30	Ret	Ret	14		11	9	2.75
18	(United Kingdom) #16 BHK Motorsport	Ligier JS P3	15	12	15	12	Ret	11	2.5
19	#20 Racing For Poland	Ligier JS P3		14					0.5
20	(Poland) #34 Team Virage	Ligier JS P3				15			0.5
Pos.	Driver	Team	LEC (France)	MNZ (Italy)	RBR (Austria)	SIL (United Kingdom)	SPA (Belgium)	POR (Portugal)	Points

Key
Colour	Result
Gold	Race winner
Silver	2nd place
Bronze	3rd place
Green	Points finish
Blue	Non-points finish
Blue	Non-classified finish (NC)
Purple	Did not finish (Ret)
Black	Disqualified (DSQ)
Black	Excluded (EX)
White	Did not start (DNS)
White	Race cancelled (C)
White	Withdrew (WD)
Blank	Did not participate

**Bold** – Pole
Italics – Fastest Lap

=== LMGTE Teams Championship ===
Pos.	Team	Car	LEC (France)	MNZ (Italy)	RBR (Austria)	SIL (United Kingdom)	SPA (Belgium)	POR (Portugal)	Total
1	(Germany) #88 Proton Competition	Porsche 911 RSR	**2**	5	1	2	**3**	3	95.5
2	(United Kingdom) #66 JMW Motorsport	Ferrari 488 GTE	1	4	**Ret**	1	4	**2**	88
3	(Germany) #77 Proton Competition	Porsche 911 RSR	5	2	4	**4**	5	1	83
4	(Switzerland) #55 Spirit of Race	Ferrari 488 GTE	Ret	1	2	3	2	4	79
5	(Italy) #80 EbiMotors	Porsche 911 RSR	3	**3**	3	Ret	1	Ret	58.5
6	(United States) #83 Krohn Racing	Ferrari 488 GTE	4	6	5	6	Ret	4	48
7	(United Kingdom) #86 Gulf Racing	Porsche 911 RSR	Ret			5			10
8	(Switzerland) #54 Spirit of Race	Ferrari 488 GTE	6						8
Pos.	Driver	Team	LEC (France)	MNZ (Italy)	RBR (Austria)	SIL (United Kingdom)	SPA (Belgium)	POR (Portugal)	Points

Key
Colour	Result
Gold	Race winner
Silver	2nd place
Bronze	3rd place
Green	Points finish
Blue	Non-points finish
Blue	Non-classified finish (NC)
Purple	Did not finish (Ret)
Black	Disqualified (DSQ)
Black	Excluded (EX)
White	Did not start (DNS)
White	Race cancelled (C)
White	Withdrew (WD)
Blank	Did not participate

**Bold** – Pole
Italics – Fastest Lap

== Drivers Championships ==
Points are awarded according to the following structure:

Position	**1st**	**2nd**	**3rd**	**4th**	**5th**	**6th**	**7th**	**8th**	**9th**	**10th**	**Other**	**Pole**
Points	25	18	15	12	10	8	6	4	2	1	0.5	1

=== LMP2 Drivers Championship ===
Pos.	Driver	Team	LEC (France)	MNZ (Italy)	RBR (Austria)	SIL (United Kingdom)	SPA (Belgium)	POR (Portugal)	Points
1	(France) Andrea Pizzitola	(Russia) G-Drive Racing	4	1	1	1	**12**	4	100.25
1	(Russia) Roman Rusinov	(Russia) G-Drive Racing	4	1	1	1	**12**	4	100.25
2	(France) Jean-Éric Vergne	(Russia) G-Drive Racing		1	1	1	**12**	4	88.25
3	(France) Norman Nato	(Spain) Racing Engineering	1	5	2	Ret	7	5	66
3	(France) Paul Petit	(Spain) Racing Engineering	1	5	2	Ret	7	5	66
3	(France) Olivier Pla	(Spain) Racing Engineering	1	5	2		7	5	66
4	(France) Paul-Loup Chatin	(France) IDEC Sport	**7**	3	**4**	3	4	6	64
4	(Mexico) Memo Rojas	(France) IDEC Sport	**7**	3	**4**	3	4	6	64
5	(United Kingdom) Phil Hanson	(United States) United Autosports	12	10	3	Ret	1	1	54
6	(Portugal) Filipe Albuquerque	(United States) United Autosports		10	3	Ret	1	1	53.5
7	(United Kingdom) Ben Hanley	(United States) DragonSpeed	Ret	**4**	5	2	2	13	50.5
7	(Sweden) Henrik Hedman	(United States) DragonSpeed	Ret	**4**	5	2	2	13	50.5
7	(France) Nicolas Lapierre	(United States) DragonSpeed	Ret	**4**	5	2	2	13	50.5
8	(France) Paul Lafargue	(France) IDEC Sport	**7**	3	**4**	3			50
9	(France) Timothé Buret	(France) Panis Barthez Competition	8	7	10	**6**	3	2	45.5
9	(France) Julien Canal	(France) Panis Barthez Competition	8	7	10	**6**	3	2	45.5
9	(United Kingdom) Will Stevens	(France) Panis Barthez Competition	8	7	10	**6**	3	2	45.5
10	(France) Loïc Duval	(France) TDS Racing	2	2	9				38
10	(France) François Perrodo	(France) TDS Racing	2	2	9				38
10	(France) Matthieu Vaxivière	(France) TDS Racing	2	2	9				38
10	(France) Matthieu Vaxivière	(Spain) Racing Engineering				Ret			38
11	(France) Nico Jamin	(France) Duqueine Engineering	3	6	DSQ	7	5	**Ret**	35
11	(France) Nelson Panciatici	(France) Duqueine Engineering	3	6	DSQ	7	5	**Ret**	35
11	(France) Pierre Ragues	(France) Duqueine Engineering	3	6	DSQ	7	5	**Ret**	35
12	(Republic of Ireland) Ryan Cullen	(Portugal) APR - Rebellion Racing	15	8	6	5	15	12	23.25
12	(United States) Gustavo Menezes	(Portugal) APR - Rebellion Racing	15	8	6	5	15	12	23.25
12	(United Kingdom) Harrison Newey	(Portugal) APR - Rebellion Racing	15	8	6	5	15	12	23.25
13	(United Kingdom) Wayne Boyd	(United States) United Autosports	9	11	15	10	6	3	23
13	(United States) Will Owen	(United States) United Autosports	9	11	15	10	6	3	23
13	(Switzerland) Hugo de Sadeleer	(United States) United Autosports	9	11	15	10	6	3	23
14	(France) Alexandre Cougnaud	(France) Graff	10	Ret	8	4	8	8	23
14	(France) Tristan Gommendy	(France) Graff	10	Ret	8	4	8	8	23
14	(Switzerland) Jonathan Hirschi	(France) Graff	10	Ret	8	4	8	8	23
15	(Australia) James Allen	(Russia) G-Drive Racing	6	Ret	13	12	11	7	15.25
16	(France) Gabriel Aubry	(France) IDEC Sport					4	6	14
17	(Switzerland) Alexandre Imperatori	(Russia) G-Drive Racing	4						12
18	(Brazil) André Negrão	(France) Signatech Alpine Matmut	5						10
18	(France) Pierre Thiriet	(France) Signatech Alpine Matmut	5						10
19	(Mexico) José Gutiérrez	(Russia) G-Drive Racing	6	Ret	13	12			9
20	(France) Enzo Guibbert	(Russia) G-Drive Racing	6	Ret					8
21	(Sweden) Henning Enqvist	(Russia) G-Drive Racing					11	7	6.25
21	(France) Julien Falchero	(Russia) G-Drive Racing					11	7	6.25
22	(Russia) Matevos Isaakyan	(Russia) SMP Racing	NC	Ret	7	Ret			6
22	(Russia) Viktor Shaytar	(Russia) SMP Racing	NC	Ret	7	Ret			6
22	(Russia) Egor Orudzhev	(Russia) SMP Racing	NC	Ret	7				6
23	(Portugal) Henrique Chaves	(Spain) AVF by Adrián Vallés	11	Ret	14	8	9	Ret	6
23	(Russia) Konstantin Tereshchenko	(Spain) AVF by Adrián Vallés	11	Ret	14	8	9	Ret	6
24	(Denmark) Dennis Andersen	(Denmark) High Class Racing	13	14	12	9	Ret	9	5.5
24	(Denmark) Anders Fjordbach	(Denmark) High Class Racing	13	14	12	9	Ret	9	5.5
25	(Italy) Roberto Lacorte	(Italy) Cetilar Villorba Corse	14	9	11	13	10	11	4.5
25	(Italy) Giorgio Sernagiotto	(Italy) Cetilar Villorba Corse	14	9	11	13	10	11	4.5
26	(Brazil) Felipe Nasr	(Italy) Cetilar Villorba Corse		9	11	13	10	11	4
27	(South Korea) Tacksung Kim	(Portugal) Algarve Pro Racing	16	13	17	11	13	10	3.25
27	(United States) Mark Patterson	(Portugal) Algarve Pro Racing	16	13	17	11	13	10	3.25
28	(Netherlands) Ate De Jong	(Portugal) Algarve Pro Racing	16	13	17	11		10	3
29	(France) Erik Maris	(France) IDEC Sport	Ret	12	16		14		1.25
30	(France) Patrice Lafargue	(France) IDEC Sport	Ret	12	16				1
31	(France) Nicolas Minassian	(France) IDEC Sport			16		14		0.75
32	(Brazil) Bruno Senna	(United States) United Autosports	12						0.5
32	(Italy) Andrea Belicchi	(Italy) Cetilar Villorba Corse	14						0.5
33	(France) William Cavailhes	(France) IDEC Sport	Ret	12					0.5
34	(United Kingdom) Garry Findlay	(Russia) G-Drive Racing				12			0.5
35	(United States) Matt McMurry	(Portugal) Algarve Pro Racing					13		0.25
35	(France) Aurélien Panis	(France) IDEC Sport					14		0.25
Pos.	Driver	Team	LEC (France)	MNZ (Italy)	RBR (Austria)	SIL (United Kingdom)	SPA (Belgium)	POR (Portugal)	Points

Key
Colour	Result
Gold	Race winner
Silver	2nd place
Bronze	3rd place
Green	Points finish
Blue	Non-points finish
Blue	Non-classified finish (NC)
Purple	Did not finish (Ret)
Black	Disqualified (DSQ)
Black	Excluded (EX)
White	Did not start (DNS)
White	Race cancelled (C)
White	Withdrew (WD)
Blank	Did not participate

**Bold** – Pole
Italics – Fastest Lap

=== LMP3 Drivers Championship ===
Pos.	Driver	Team	LEC (France)	MNZ (Italy)	RBR (Austria)	SIL (United Kingdom)	SPA (Belgium)	POR (Portugal)	Points
1	(Canada) John Farano	(United Kingdom) RLR MSport	1	11	1	6	2	5	77.5
1	(United Kingdom) Rob Garofall	(United Kingdom) RLR MSport	1	11	1	6	2	5	77.5
1	(Netherlands) Job van Uitert	(United Kingdom) RLR MSport	1	11	1	6	2	5	77.5
2	(Germany) Martin Hippe	(Poland) Inter Europol Competition	6	4	3	5	12	1	70.25
2	(Poland) Jakub Śmiechowski	(Poland) Inter Europol Competition	6	4	3	5	12	1	70.25
3	(United Kingdom) Matthew Bell	(United States) United Autosports	7	3	12	1	4	7	58.5
3	(Canada) Garett Grist	(United States) United Autosports	7	3	12	1	4	7	58.5
3	(United Kingdom) Anthony Wells	(United States) United Autosports	7	3	12	1	4	7	58.5
4	(United Kingdom) Alex Kapadia	(United Kingdom) Ecurie Ecosse/Nielsen	9	10	2	2	9	2	58
4	(United Kingdom) Colin Noble	(United Kingdom) Ecurie Ecosse/Nielsen	9	10	2	2	9	2	58
4	(Denmark) Christian Stubbe Olsen	(United Kingdom) Ecurie Ecosse/Nielsen	9	10	2	2	9	2	58
5	(United Kingdom) Ross Kaiser	(United Kingdom) 360 Racing	4	2	8	4	3	16	54
5	(United Kingdom) Terrence Woodward	(United Kingdom) 360 Racing	4	2	8	4	3	16	54
6	(United States) John Falb	(United States) United Autosports	4	2	8	4	3	16	53.5
7	(Italy) Giorgio Mondini	(United States) EuroInternational	3	1	7	16	13	Ret	46.75
7	(Netherlands) Kay van Berlo	(United States) EuroInternational	3	1	7	16	13	Ret	46.75
8	(France) François Hériau	(France) Ultimate	Ret	**7**	**4**	3	**Ret**	12	36.5
8	(France) Jean-Baptiste Lahaye	(France) Ultimate	Ret	**7**	**4**	3	**Ret**	12	36.5
8	(France) Matthieu Lahaye	(France) Ultimate	Ret	**7**	**4**	3	**Ret**	12	36.5
9	(Russia) Timur Boguslavskiy	(Spain) NEFIS By Speed Factory	16	6	6	Ret	10	4	29
9	(Ukraine) Aleksey Chuklin	(Spain) NEFIS By Speed Factory	16	6	6	Ret	10	4	29
9	(Russia) Daniil Pronenko	(Spain) NEFIS By Speed Factory	16	6	6	Ret	10	4	29
10	(Switzerland) David Droux	(France) M.Racing - YMR	**2**	13	Ret	8	8	**10**	27.5
10	(Switzerland) Lucas Légeret	(France) M.Racing - YMR	**2**	13	Ret	8	8	**10**	27.5
Pos.	Driver	Team	LEC (France)	MNZ (Italy)	RBR (Austria)	SIL (United Kingdom)	SPA (Belgium)	POR (Portugal)	Points

Key
Colour	Result
Gold	Race winner
Silver	2nd place
Bronze	3rd place
Green	Points finish
Blue	Non-points finish
Blue	Non-classified finish (NC)
Purple	Did not finish (Ret)
Black	Disqualified (DSQ)
Black	Excluded (EX)
White	Did not start (DNS)
White	Race cancelled (C)
White	Withdrew (WD)
Blank	Did not participate

**Bold** – Pole
Italics – Fastest Lap

=== LMGTE Drivers Championship ===
Pos.	Driver	Team	LEC (France)	MNZ (Italy)	RBR (Austria)	SIL (United Kingdom)	SPA (Belgium)	POR (Portugal)	Points
1	(Italy) Gianluca Roda	(Germany) Proton Competition	**2**	5	1	2	**3**	3	95.5
1	(Italy) Giorgio Roda	(Germany) Proton Competition	**2**	5	1	2	**3**	3	95.5
2	(United Kingdom) Liam Griffin	(United Kingdom) JMW Motorsport	1	4	**Ret**	1	4	**2**	88
2	(United Kingdom) Alex MacDowall	(United Kingdom) JMW Motorsport	1	4	**Ret**	1	4	**2**	88
2	(Spain) Miguel Molina	(United Kingdom) JMW Motorsport	1	4	**Ret**	1	4	**2**	88
3	(Italy) Matteo Cairoli	(Germany) Proton Competition	**2**		1	2	**3**	3	85.5
4	(Germany) Marvin Dienst	(Germany) Proton Competition	5	2	4	**4**	5	1	83
4	(Germany) Christian Ried	(Germany) Proton Competition	5	2	4	**4**	5	1	83
5	(United Kingdom) Duncan Cameron	(Switzerland) Spirit of Race	Ret	1	2	3	2	4	79
5	(Republic of Ireland) Matt Griffin	(Switzerland) Spirit of Race	Ret	1	2	3	2	4	79
5	(United Kingdom) Aaron Scott	(Switzerland) Spirit of Race	Ret	1	2	3	2	4	79
Pos.	Driver	Team	LEC (France)	MNZ (Italy)	RBR (Austria)	SIL (United Kingdom)	SPA (Belgium)	POR (Portugal)	Points

Key
Colour	Result
Gold	Race winner
Silver	2nd place
Bronze	3rd place
Green	Points finish
Blue	Non-points finish
Blue	Non-classified finish (NC)
Purple	Did not finish (Ret)
Black	Disqualified (DSQ)
Black	Excluded (EX)
White	Did not start (DNS)
White	Race cancelled (C)
White	Withdrew (WD)
Blank	Did not participate

**Bold** – Pole
Italics – Fastest Lap
