= Matthieu Lahaye =

French racing driver

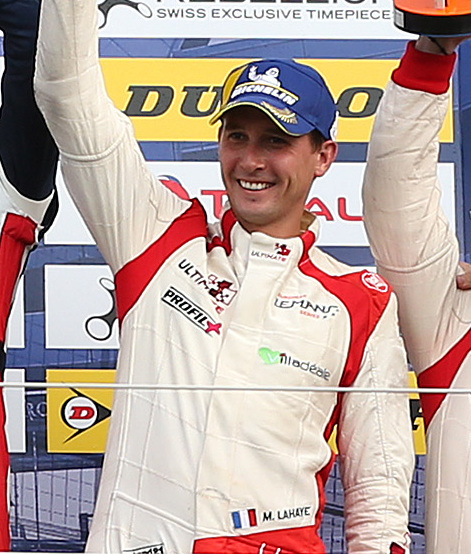
- Lahaye during the 2018 4 Hours of Silverstone
- Nationality: (France) French
- Born: Matthieu Joseph Joël Lahaye; 23 November 1984 (age 41) Rennes, France

FIA World Endurance Championship career
- Categorisation: FIA Gold (until 2015); FIA Silver (2016–)
- Former teams: Ultimate, OAK Racing

Previous series
- 2011 2011 2008–2011 2005–2008 2004 2002–03 2001–02: Intercontinental Le Mans Cup; American Le Mans Series; Le Mans Series; Eurocup Mégane Trophy; World Series Lights; French Formula Renault; Formula France
24 Hours of Le Mans career
- Years: 2008–2010, 2012, 2021
- Teams: Saulnier/OAK
- Best finish: 7th (2010)
- Class wins: None

Matthieu Joseph Joël Lahaye (born 23 November 1984 in Rennes) is a French racing driver. He competed in the FIA World Endurance Championship for OAK Racing in 2012 and for Ultimate in 2022. Along with his brother Jean-Baptiste, he runs a small sports car racing team called Ultimate, as well as family business Lahaye Global Logistics.

== Career ==
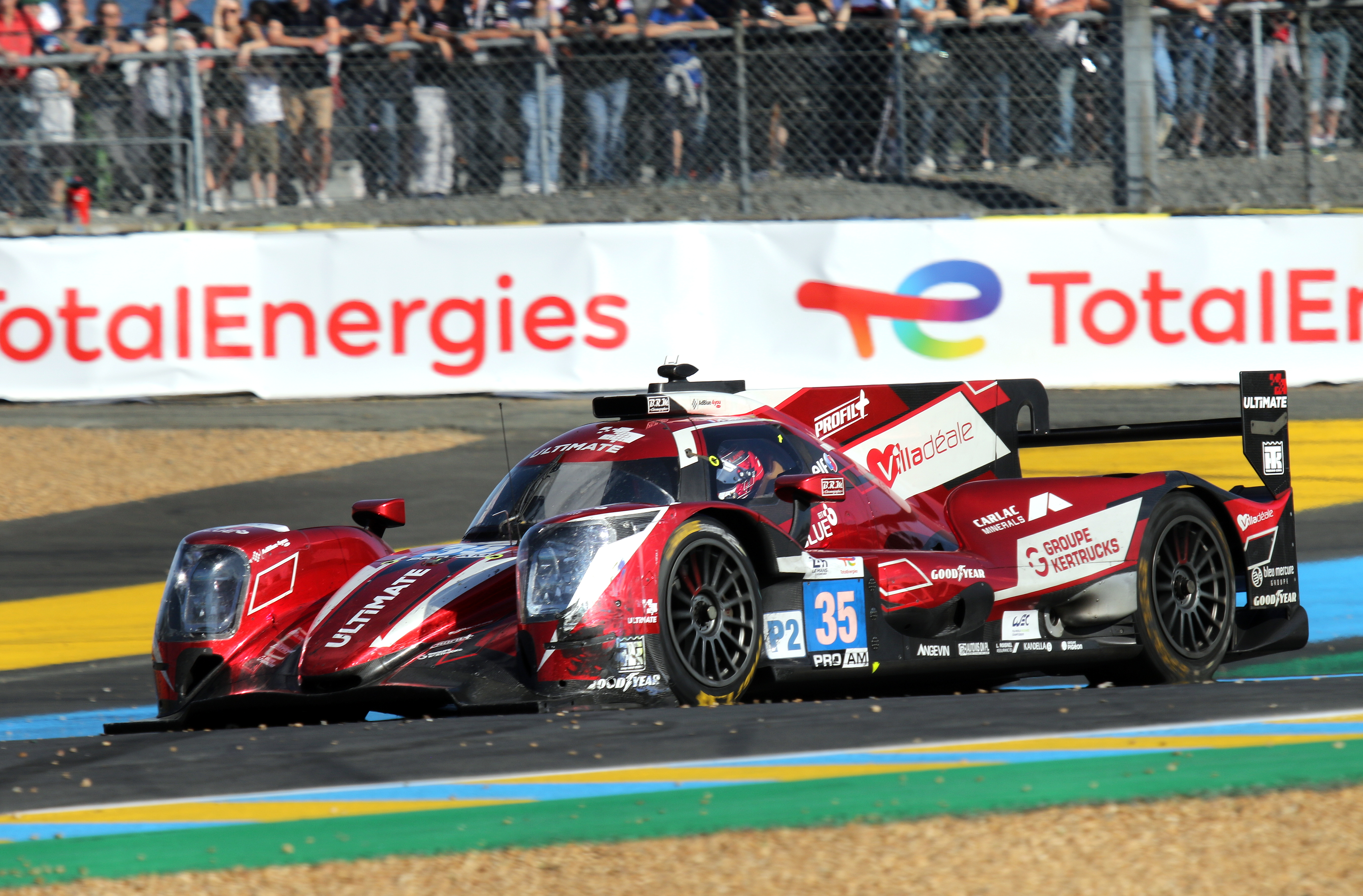
Lahaye's Ultimate LMP2 machine at the 2022 24 Hours of Le Mans.

Lahaye's career began in karting, in which he competed between 1995 and 2001. He then took part in Formula France and French Formula Renault. In 2004, he contested World Series Lights, finishing fifth in the standings with a win at Valencia. He moved on to the Eurocup Mégane Trophy in 2005 for Tech 1 Racing, finishing his first season ninth overall. The following year, he won three times on his way to the runner-up spot. 2007 saw him slip to fifth place with just one win.

2008 saw Lahaye switch to sportscars, driving in the Le Mans Series for Saulnier Racing. Racing a Pescarolo-Judd with Pierre Ragues, he finished fifth in the LMP2 standings. He also took part in his first 24 Hours of Le Mans with the team together with Ragues and China's Congfu Cheng, finishing 18th overall and third in LMP2.

In 2009, Lahaye continued with the team (now renamed OAK Racing) in the LMP2 class of the LMS, with Karim Ajlani as his teammate. They scored two podium finishes from the five races, finishing ninth in the final standings. He and Ajlani were joined at Le Mans by Guillaume Moreau, but the car retired from the race. Lahaye did win the class in the two races at Okayama that made up the 2009 Asian Le Mans Series, partnering team owner Jacques Nicolet and Richard Hein.

In 2010, Lahaye partnered Nicolet in the Le Mans Series, and finished the year third in LMP2. At Le Mans, he finished seventh overall and second in LMP2, sharing with Moreau and Jan Charouz.

In 2011, Lahaye contested the LMP1 category of the Intercontinental Le Mans Cup with OAK. However, a heavy accident in qualifying at Spa left him with two broken vertebrae, a broken hand and an injured knee, and he would miss the 24 Hours of Le Mans.

In 2012, Lahaye competed in the FIA World Endurance Championship in OAK's Morgan LMP2 alongside Nicolet and Olivier Pla.

== Racing record ==
=== Complete FIA World Endurance Championship results ===
Year	Entrant	Class	Car	Engine	1	2	3	4	5	6	7	8	Rank	Points
2012	OAK Racing	LMP2	Morgan LMP2	Judd HK 3.6 L V8	**SEB**; 2	SPA; 5	LMS; Ret						36th	6.5
2012	OAK Racing	LMP2	Morgan LMP2	Nissan VK45DE 4.5 L V8				SIL; 6	SÃO; 3	BHR; 6	FUJ; 3	SHA; 3	36th	6.5
2021	Association SRT41	Innovative	Oreca 07	Gibson GK428 4.2L V8	SPA	ALG	MNZ	LMS; 32	BHR	BHR			0	0
2022	Ultimate	LMP2	Oreca 07	Gibson GK428 4.2L V8	SEB; 10	SPA; 12	LMS; 14	MNZ; 8	FUJ; 12	BHR; 11			21st	6

=== 24 Hours of Le Mans results ===
Year	Team	Co-Drivers	Car	Class	Laps	Pos.	Class Pos.
2008	(France) Saulnier Racing	(France) Pierre Ragues (China) Cheng Congfu	Pescarolo 01-Judd	LMP2	333	18th	**3rd**
2009	OAK Racing; Team Mazda France	(France) Guillaume Moreau (Switzerland) Karim Ajlani	Pescarolo 01-Mazda	LMP2	208	DNF	DNF
2010	(France) OAK Racing	(France) Guillaume Moreau (Czech Republic) Jan Charouz	Pescarolo 01-Judd	LMP2	361	7th	**2nd**
2012	(France) OAK Racing	(France) Jacques Nicolet (France) Olivier Pla	Morgan LMP2-Judd	LMP2	139	DNF	DNF
2021	(France) Association SRT41	(Belgium) Nigel Bailly (Japan) Takuma Aoki	Oreca 07-Gibson	Innovative	334	32nd	–
2022	(France) Ultimate	(France) François Hériau (France) Jean-Baptiste Lahaye	Oreca 07-Gibson	LMP2	335	48th	24th

=== Complete European Le Mans Series results ===
(key) (Races in bold indicate pole position; results in italics indicate fastest lap)

Year	Entrant	Class	Chassis	Engine	1	2	3	4	5	6	Rank	Points
2012	OAK Racing	LMP2	Morgan LMP2	Judd-BMW HK 3.6L V8	LEC	**DON**; 6	PET				12th	9
2016	Ultimate	LMP3	Ligier JS P3	Nissan VK50VE 5.0 L V8	SIL; 11	IMO; 10	RBR; Ret	LEC; 4	SPA; 4	EST; 14	10th	26
2017	Ultimate	LMP3	Ligier JS P3	Nissan VK50VE 5.0 L V8	SIL; 2	MNZ; 3	RBR; 4	LEC; 6	SPA; 8	ALG; 8	4th	61
2018	Ultimate	LMP3	Norma M30	Nissan VK50VE 5.0 L V8	LEC; Ret	**MNZ**; 7	**RBR**; 4	SIL; 3	**SPA**; Ret	ALG; 12	8th	36.5
2019	Ultimate	LMP3	Norma M30	Nissan VK50VE 5.0 L V8	LEC; 1	MNZ; Ret	CAT; 2	SIL; 7	SPA; 4	ALG; 3	3rd	76
2021	Ultimate	LMP2	Oreca 07	Gibson GK428 4.2 L V8	CAT; 5	RBR; 5	LEC; 13	MNZ; 11	SPA; 10	ALG; 11	16th	23
2021	Ultimate	Pro-Am Cup	Oreca 07	Gibson GK428 4.2 L V8	1	3	4	3	10	3	3rd	82
2023	Ultimate	LMP3	Ligier JS P320	Nissan VK56DE 5.6 L V8	CAT; 7	LEC; 12	ARA; 3	SPA; Ret	PRT; 2	ALG; Ret	9th	39
2024	Ultimate	LMP3	Ligier JS P320	Nissan VK56DE 5.6L V8	CAT; 9	LEC; 3	IMO; 3	SPA; 5	MUG; 5	ALG; Ret	11th	32
2025	Ultimate	LMP3	Ligier JS P325	Toyota V35A 3.5 L V6	CAT; 5	LEC; 6	IMO; 6	SPA; 6	SIL; 3	ALG; 7	7th	55

^{*} Season still in progress.
