= Speed Factory Racing =

(Spain) Speed Factory Racing
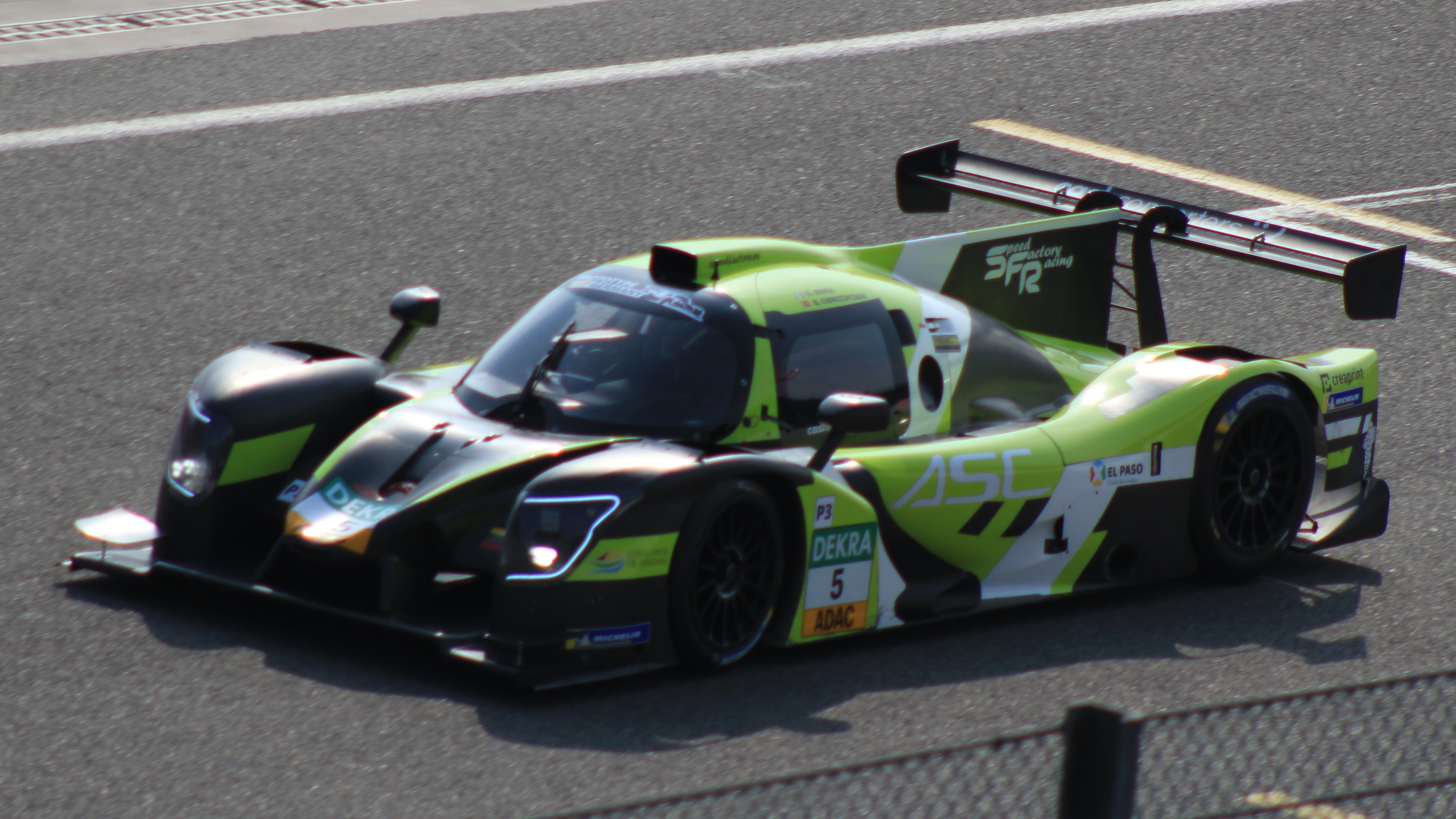
- Founded: 2008
- Team principal(s): Dalius Steponavicius
- Current series: European Le Mans Series
- Former series: Radical Germany Cup; Radical World Cup; Radical European Masters; European Le Mans Series; Ultimate Cup Series; 24H Series
- Teams' Championships: 2010 Radical Masters Euroseries III; 2015 European Le Mans Series III
- Drivers' Championships: 2008 Radical European Masters Class Radical SR5 (M. Neliubsys); 2009 Radical European Masters Class Radical SR5 (T. Meidinger); 2012 Radical Masters Euroseries Champion (K. Calko)

Speed Factory Racing is an auto racing team based in Spain.

== History ==
Speed Factory Racing was formed by Lithuanian rally driver Dalius Steponavicius in 2008 with a target to help and prepare race drivers for endurance racing. During the period from 2008 to the end of 2014 Speed Factory Racing won three times in the drivers classification of the Radical European Masters (2008, 2009, 2012). Speed Factory Racing entered the European Le Mans Series in 2015 and ran the Ginetta-Juno LMP3 car, winning third place in the Team Classification. From 2016 to 2018 the team ran a Ligier JS P3 in the European Le Mans Series.
