= 2018 4 Hours of Le Castellet =

1A-V2 layout of Circuit Paul Ricard used for this race (pit road was different before 2019)

The 2018 4 Hours of Le Castellet was an endurance motor race that took place at the Circuit Paul Ricard near Le Castellet, France between 13 and 15 April 2018, and served as the opening round of the 2018 European Le Mans Series.

The overall race victory was taken by the LMP2-class Oreca 07 of Racing Engineering, with Norman Nato, Paul Petit and Olivier Pla winning on the teams' debut in the series.

== Qualifying ==
=== Qualifying result ===
Pole position winners in each class are in bold.

| Pos. | Class | No° | Team | Chassis | Time | Grid |
|---|---|---|---|---|---|---|
| 1 | **LMP2** | **28** | **(France) IDEC Sport** | **Oreca 07** | **1:41.194** | **1** |
| 2 | LMP2 | 33 | (France) TDS Racing | Oreca 07 | 1:41.638 | 2 |
| 3 | LMP2 | 21 | (United States) DragonSpeed | Oreca 07 | 1:41.904 | 3 |
| 4 | LMP2 | 24 | (Spain) Racing Engineering | Oreca 07 | 1:42.130 | 4 |
| 5 | LMP2 | 29 | (France) Duqueine Engineering | Oreca 07 | 1:42.138 | 5 |
| 6 | LMP2 | 31 | (Portugal) APR - Rebellion Racing | Oreca 07 | 1:42.194 | 6 |
| 7 | LMP2 | 23 | (France) Panis Barthez Competition | Ligier JS P217 | 1:42.199 | 7 |
| 8 | LMP2 | 36 | (France) Signatech Alpine Matmut | Alpine A470 | 1:42.230 | 8 |
| 9 | LMP2 | 35 | (Russia) SMP Racing | Dallara P217 | 1:42.507 | 9 |
| 10 | LMP2 | 40 | (Russia) G-Drive Racing | Oreca 07 | 1:42.582 | 10 |
| 11 | LMP2 | 30 | (Spain) AVF by Adrián Vallés | Dallara P217 | 1:42.660 | 11 |
| 12 | LMP2 | 26 | (Russia) G-Drive Racing | Oreca 07 | 1:42.850 | 12 |
| 13 | LMP2 | 39 | (France) Graff | Oreca 07 | 1:43.139 | 13 |
| 14 | LMP2 | 32 | (United States) United Autosports | Ligier JS P217 | 1:43.410 | 14 |
| 15 | LMP2 | 49 | (Denmark) High Class Racing | Dallara P217 | 1:43.717 | 15 |
| 16 | LMP2 | 47 | (Italy) Cetilar Villorba Corse | Dallara P217 | 1:43.895 | 16 |
| 17 | LMP2 | 22 | (United States) United Autosports | Ligier JS P217 | 1:44.043 | 17 |
| 18 | LMP2 | 27 | (France) IDEC Sport | Ligier JS P217 | 1:46.016 | 18 |
| 19 | LMP2 | 25 | (Portugal) Algarve Pro Racing | Ligier JS P217 | 1:47.194 | 19 |
| 20 | **LMP3** | **19** | **(France) M.Racing - YMR** | **Norma M30** | **1:51.930** | **20** |
| 21 | LMP3 | 17 | (France) Ultimate | Norma M30 | 1:51.991 | 21 |
| 22 | LMP3 | 8 | (Luxembourg) DKR Engineering | Norma M30 | 1:52.104 | 22 |
| 23 | LMP3 | 15 | (United Kingdom) RLR Msport | Ligier JS P3 | 1:52.108 | 23 |
| 24 | LMP3 | 2 | (United States) United Autosports | Ligier JS P3 | 1:52.641 | 24 |
| 25 | LMP3 | 3 | (United States) United Autosports | Ligier JS P3 | 1:52.711 | 25 |
| 26 | LMP3 | 6 | (United Kingdom) 360 Racing | Ligier JS P3 | 1:52.783 | 26 |
| 27 | LMP3 | 11 | (United States) Eurointernational | Ligier JS P3 | 1:53.009 | 27 |
| 28 | LMP3 | 18 | (France) M.Racing - YMR | Ligier JS P3 | 1:53.070 | 28 |
| 29 | LMP3 | 5 | (Spain) NEFIS By Speed Factory | Ligier JS P3 | 1:53.198 | 29 |
| 30 | **LMGTE** | **88** | **(Germany) Proton Competition** | **Porsche 911 RSR** | **1:53.377** | **30** |
| 31 | LMP3 | 9 | (Austria) AT Racing | Ligier JS P3 | 1:53.383 | 31 |
| 32 | LMP3 | 13 | (Poland) Inter Europol Competition | Ligier JS P3 | 1:53.400 | 32 |
| 33 | LMP3 | 7 | (United Kingdom) Ecurie Ecosse/Nielsen | Ligier JS P3 | 1:53.638 | 33 |
| 34 | LMP3 | 4 | (Switzerland) Cool Racing | Ligier JS P3 | 1:53.872 | 34 |
| 35 | LMP3 | 12 | (United States) Eurointernational | Ligier JS P3 | 1:54.027 | 35 |
| 36 | LMP3 | 10 | (Italy) Oregon Team | Norma M30 | 1:54.172 | 36 |
| 37 | LMGTE | 66 | (United Kingdom) JMW Motorsport | Ferrari 488 GTE | 1:54.562 | 37 |
| 38 | LMP3 | 14 | (Poland) Inter Europol Competition | Ligier JS P3 | 1:54.582 | 38 |
| 39 | LMGTE | 77 | (Germany) Proton Competition | Porsche 911 RSR | 1:54.830 | 39 |
| 40 | LMGTE | 83 | (United States) Krohn Racing | Ferrari 488 GTE | 1:54.905 | 40 |
| 41 | LMGTE | 55 | (Switzerland) Spirit of Race | Ferrari 488 GTE | 1:54.949 | 41 |
| 42 | LMP3 | 16 | (United Kingdom) BHK Motorsport | Ligier JS P3 | 1:55.159 | 42 |
| 43 | LMGTE | 80 | (Italy) Ebimotors | Porsche 911 RSR | 1:55.183 | 43 |
| 44 | LMGTE | 54 | (Switzerland) Spirit of Race | Ferrari 488 GTE | 1:55.790 | 44 |
| 45 | LMGTE | 86 | (United Kingdom) Gulf Racing | Porsche 911 RSR | No Time | 45^{1} |

Notes

- **^1** – The No° 86 Gulf Racing Porsche 911 RSR originally qualified second in class but had all lap times deleted due to a stewards' decision.

== Race ==
=== Race result ===
Class winners are in bold and ‡.

| Pos. | Class | No° | Team | Drivers | Chassis | Tyre | Laps |
| Pos. | Class | No° | Team | Drivers | Engine | Tyre | Laps |
|---|---|---|---|---|---|---|---|
| 1 | **LMP2** | **24** | **(Spain) Racing Engineering** | **(France) Norman Nato (France) Paul Petit (France) Olivier Pla** | **Oreca 07** | D | **129‡** |
| 1 | **LMP2** | **24** | **(Spain) Racing Engineering** | **(France) Norman Nato (France) Paul Petit (France) Olivier Pla** | **Gibson GK428 4.2 L V8** | D | **129‡** |
| 2 | LMP2 | 33 | (France) TDS Racing | (France) Loïc Duval (France) François Perrodo (France) Matthieu Vaxivière | Oreca 07 | D | 129 |
| 2 | LMP2 | 33 | (France) TDS Racing | (France) Loïc Duval (France) François Perrodo (France) Matthieu Vaxivière | Gibson GK428 4.2 L V8 | D | 129 |
| 3 | LMP2 | 29 | (France) Duqueine Engineering | (France) Nico Jamin (France) Nelson Panciatici (France) Pierre Ragues | Oreca 07 | MI | 129 |
| 3 | LMP2 | 29 | (France) Duqueine Engineering | (France) Nico Jamin (France) Nelson Panciatici (France) Pierre Ragues | Gibson GK428 4.2 L V8 | MI | 129 |
| 4 | LMP2 | 26 | (Russia) G-Drive Racing | (Switzerland) Alexandre Imperatori (France) Andrea Pizzitola (Russia) Roman Rusinov | Oreca 07 | D | 129 |
| 4 | LMP2 | 26 | (Russia) G-Drive Racing | (Switzerland) Alexandre Imperatori (France) Andrea Pizzitola (Russia) Roman Rusinov | Gibson GK428 4.2 L V8 | D | 129 |
| 5 | LMP2 | 36 | (France) Signatech Alpine Matmut | (Brazil) André Negrão (France) Pierre Thiriet | Alpine A470 | D | 129 |
| 5 | LMP2 | 36 | (France) Signatech Alpine Matmut | (Brazil) André Negrão (France) Pierre Thiriet | Gibson GK428 4.2 L V8 | D | 129 |
| 6 | LMP2 | 40 | (Russia) G-Drive Racing | (Australia) James Allen (France) Enzo Guibbert (Mexico) José Gutiérrez | Oreca 07 | D | 129 |
| 6 | LMP2 | 40 | (Russia) G-Drive Racing | (Australia) James Allen (France) Enzo Guibbert (Mexico) José Gutiérrez | Gibson GK428 4.2 L V8 | D | 129 |
| 7 | LMP2 | 28 | (France) IDEC Sport | (France) Paul-Loup Chatin (France) Paul Lafargue (Mexico) Memo Rojas | Oreca 07 | MI | 128 |
| 7 | LMP2 | 28 | (France) IDEC Sport | (France) Paul-Loup Chatin (France) Paul Lafargue (Mexico) Memo Rojas | Gibson GK428 4.2 L V8 | MI | 128 |
| 8 | LMP2 | 23 | (France) Panis Barthez Competition | (France) Timothé Buret (France) Julien Canal (United Kingdom) Will Stevens | Ligier JS P217 | MI | 128 |
| 8 | LMP2 | 23 | (France) Panis Barthez Competition | (France) Timothé Buret (France) Julien Canal (United Kingdom) Will Stevens | Gibson GK428 4.2 L V8 | MI | 128 |
| 9 | LMP2 | 32 | (United States) United Autosports | (United Kingdom) Wayne Boyd (United States) Will Owen (Switzerland) Hugo de Sadeleer | Ligier JS P217 | D | 128 |
| 9 | LMP2 | 32 | (United States) United Autosports | (United Kingdom) Wayne Boyd (United States) Will Owen (Switzerland) Hugo de Sadeleer | Gibson GK428 4.2 L V8 | D | 128 |
| 10 | LMP2 | 39 | (France) Graff | (France) Alexandre Cougnaud (France) Tristan Gommendy (Switzerland) Jonathan Hirschi | Oreca 07 | D | 128 |
| 10 | LMP2 | 39 | (France) Graff | (France) Alexandre Cougnaud (France) Tristan Gommendy (Switzerland) Jonathan Hirschi | Gibson GK428 4.2 L V8 | D | 128 |
| 11 | LMP2 | 30 | (Spain) AVF by Adrián Vallés | (Portugal) Henrique Chaves (Russia) Konstantin Tereshchenko | Dallara P217 | D | 128 |
| 11 | LMP2 | 30 | (Spain) AVF by Adrián Vallés | (Portugal) Henrique Chaves (Russia) Konstantin Tereshchenko | Gibson GK428 4.2 L V8 | D | 128 |
| 12 | LMP2 | 22 | (United States) United Autosports | (United Kingdom) Philip Hanson (Brazil) Bruno Senna | Ligier JS P217 | D | 128 |
| 12 | LMP2 | 22 | (United States) United Autosports | (United Kingdom) Philip Hanson (Brazil) Bruno Senna | Gibson GK428 4.2 L V8 | D | 128 |
| 13 | LMP2 | 49 | (Denmark) High Class Racing | (Denmark) Dennis Andersen (Denmark) Anders Fjordbach | Dallara P217 | D | 127 |
| 13 | LMP2 | 49 | (Denmark) High Class Racing | (Denmark) Dennis Andersen (Denmark) Anders Fjordbach | Gibson GK428 4.2 L V8 | D | 127 |
| 14 | LMP2 | 47 | (Italy) Cetilar Villorba Corse | (Italy) Andrea Belicchi (Italy) Roberto Lacorte (Italy) Giorgio Sernagiotto | Dallara P217 | D | 127 |
| 14 | LMP2 | 47 | (Italy) Cetilar Villorba Corse | (Italy) Andrea Belicchi (Italy) Roberto Lacorte (Italy) Giorgio Sernagiotto | Gibson GK428 4.2 L V8 | D | 127 |
| 15 | LMP2 | 31 | (Portugal) APR - Rebellion Racing | (United Kingdom) Ryan Cullen (United States) Gustavo Menezes (United Kingdom) Harrison Newey | Oreca 07 | D | 127 |
| 15 | LMP2 | 31 | (Portugal) APR - Rebellion Racing | (United Kingdom) Ryan Cullen (United States) Gustavo Menezes (United Kingdom) Harrison Newey | Gibson GK428 4.2 L V8 | D | 127 |
| 16 | **LMP3** | **15** | **(United Kingdom) RLR Msport** | **(Canada) John Farano (United Kingdom) Rob Garofall (Netherlands) Job van Uitert** | **Ligier JS P3** | MI | **119‡** |
| 16 | **LMP3** | **15** | **(United Kingdom) RLR Msport** | **(Canada) John Farano (United Kingdom) Rob Garofall (Netherlands) Job van Uitert** | **Nissan VK50VE 5.0 L V8** | MI | **119‡** |
| 17 | LMP3 | 19 | (France) M.Racing - YMR | (Switzerland) David Droux (France) Nicolas Ferrer (Switzerland) Lucas Légeret | Norma M30 | MI | 119 |
| 17 | LMP3 | 19 | (France) M.Racing - YMR | (Switzerland) David Droux (France) Nicolas Ferrer (Switzerland) Lucas Légeret | Nissan VK50VE 5.0 L V8 | MI | 119 |
| 18^{2} | LMP3 | 11 | (United States) Eurointernational | (Italy) Giorgio Mondini (Netherlands) Kay van Berlo | Ligier JS P3 | MI | 119 |
| 18^{2} | LMP3 | 11 | (United States) Eurointernational | (Italy) Giorgio Mondini (Netherlands) Kay van Berlo | Nissan VK50VE 5.0 L V8 | MI | 119 |
| 19 | LMP3 | 6 | (United Kingdom) 360 Racing | (United Kingdom) Ross Kaiser (United Kingdom) James Swift (United Kingdom) Terrence Woodward | Ligier JS P3 | MI | 119 |
| 19 | LMP3 | 6 | (United Kingdom) 360 Racing | (United Kingdom) Ross Kaiser (United Kingdom) James Swift (United Kingdom) Terrence Woodward | Nissan VK50VE 5.0 L V8 | MI | 119 |
| 20 | LMP3 | 2 | (United States) United Autosports | (United States) John Falb (United States) Sean Rayhall | Ligier JS P3 | MI | 119 |
| 20 | LMP3 | 2 | (United States) United Autosports | (United States) John Falb (United States) Sean Rayhall | Nissan VK50VE 5.0 L V8 | MI | 119 |
| 21 | LMP3 | 13 | (Poland) Inter Europol Competition | (Germany) Martin Hippe (Poland) Jakub Śmiechowski | Ligier JS P3 | MI | 118 |
| 21 | LMP3 | 13 | (Poland) Inter Europol Competition | (Germany) Martin Hippe (Poland) Jakub Śmiechowski | Nissan VK50VE 5.0 L V8 | MI | 118 |
| 22 | LMP3 | 3 | (United States) United Autosports | (United Kingdom) Matthew Bell (Canada) Garett Grist (United Kingdom) Anthony Wells | Ligier JS P3 | MI | 118 |
| 22 | LMP3 | 3 | (United States) United Autosports | (United Kingdom) Matthew Bell (Canada) Garett Grist (United Kingdom) Anthony Wells | Nissan VK50VE 5.0 L V8 | MI | 118 |
| 23 | LMP3 | 9 | (Austria) AT Racing | (France) Yann Clairay (Belarus) Alexander Talkanitsa, Jr. (Belarus) Alexander Talkanitsa, Sr. | Ligier JS P3 | MI | 118 |
| 23 | LMP3 | 9 | (Austria) AT Racing | (France) Yann Clairay (Belarus) Alexander Talkanitsa, Jr. (Belarus) Alexander Talkanitsa, Sr. | Nissan VK50VE 5.0 L V8 | MI | 118 |
| 24 | LMP3 | 7 | (United Kingdom) Ecurie Ecosse/Nielsen | (United Kingdom) Alex Kapadia (United Kingdom) Colin Noble (Denmark) Christian Stubbe Olsen | Ligier JS P3 | MI | 118 |
| 24 | LMP3 | 7 | (United Kingdom) Ecurie Ecosse/Nielsen | (United Kingdom) Alex Kapadia (United Kingdom) Colin Noble (Denmark) Christian Stubbe Olsen | Nissan VK50VE 5.0 L V8 | MI | 118 |
| 25 | LMP3 | 4 | (Switzerland) Cool Racing | (Switzerland) Iradj Alexander (Switzerland) Antonin Borga (Switzerland) Alexandre Coigny | Ligier JS P3 | MI | 118 |
| 25 | LMP3 | 4 | (Switzerland) Cool Racing | (Switzerland) Iradj Alexander (Switzerland) Antonin Borga (Switzerland) Alexandre Coigny | Nissan VK50VE 5.0 L V8 | MI | 118 |
| 26 | **LMGTE** | **66** | **(United Kingdom) JMW Motorsport** | **(United Kingdom) Liam Griffin (United Kingdom) Alex MacDowall (Spain) Miguel Molina** | **Ferrari 488 GTE** | D | **118‡** |
| 26 | **LMGTE** | **66** | **(United Kingdom) JMW Motorsport** | **(United Kingdom) Liam Griffin (United Kingdom) Alex MacDowall (Spain) Miguel Molina** | **Ferrari F154CB 3.9 L Turbo V8** | D | **118‡** |
| 27 | LMGTE | 88 | (Germany) Proton Competition | (Italy) Matteo Cairoli (Italy) Gianluca Roda (Italy) Giorgio Roda | Porsche 911 RSR | D | 118 |
| 27 | LMGTE | 88 | (Germany) Proton Competition | (Italy) Matteo Cairoli (Italy) Gianluca Roda (Italy) Giorgio Roda | Porsche 4.0 L Flat-6 | D | 118 |
| 28 | LMP3 | 10 | (Italy) Oregon Team | (France) Clément Mateu (Colombia) Andrés Méndez (Italy) Riccardo Ponzio | Norma M30 | MI | 117 |
| 28 | LMP3 | 10 | (Italy) Oregon Team | (France) Clément Mateu (Colombia) Andrés Méndez (Italy) Riccardo Ponzio | Nissan VK50VE 5.0 L V8 | MI | 117 |
| 29 | LMGTE | 80 | (Italy) EbiMotors | (Italy) Fabio Babini (France) Raymond Narac (Italy) Riccardo Pera | Porsche 911 RSR | D | 117 |
| 29 | LMGTE | 80 | (Italy) EbiMotors | (Italy) Fabio Babini (France) Raymond Narac (Italy) Riccardo Pera | Porsche 4.0 L Flat-6 | D | 117 |
| 30 | LMP3 | 14 | (Poland) Inter Europol Competition | (Italy) Luca Demarchi (Sweden) Henning Enqvist (Germany) Paul Scheuschner | Ligier JS P3 | MI | 117 |
| 30 | LMP3 | 14 | (Poland) Inter Europol Competition | (Italy) Luca Demarchi (Sweden) Henning Enqvist (Germany) Paul Scheuschner | Nissan VK50VE 5.0 L V8 | MI | 117 |
| 31 | LMP3 | 18 | (France) M.Racing - YMR | (France) Natan Bihel (France) Laurent Millara | Ligier JS P3 | MI | 117 |
| 31 | LMP3 | 18 | (France) M.Racing - YMR | (France) Natan Bihel (France) Laurent Millara | Nissan VK50VE 5.0 L V8 | MI | 117 |
| 32 | LMGTE | 83 | (United States) Krohn Racing | (Italy) Andrea Bertolini (Sweden) Niclas Jönsson (United States) Tracy Krohn | Ferrari 488 GTE | D | 117 |
| 32 | LMGTE | 83 | (United States) Krohn Racing | (Italy) Andrea Bertolini (Sweden) Niclas Jönsson (United States) Tracy Krohn | Ferrari F154CB 3.9 L Turbo V8 | D | 117 |
| 33 | LMP3 | 12 | (United States) Eurointernational | (Canada) James Dayson (Italy) Andrea Dromedari (United States) Max Hanratty | Ligier JS P3 | MI | 116 |
| 33 | LMP3 | 12 | (United States) Eurointernational | (Canada) James Dayson (Italy) Andrea Dromedari (United States) Max Hanratty | Nissan VK50VE 5.0 L V8 | MI | 116 |
| 34 | LMP3 | 16 | (United Kingdom) BHK Motorsport | (Italy) Jacopo Baratto (Italy) Francesco Dracone | Ligier JS P3 | MI | 116 |
| 34 | LMP3 | 16 | (United Kingdom) BHK Motorsport | (Italy) Jacopo Baratto (Italy) Francesco Dracone | Nissan VK50VE 5.0 L V8 | MI | 116 |
| 35 | LMGTE | 77 | (Germany) Proton Competition | (Germany) Marvin Dienst (Norway) Dennis Olsen (Germany) Christian Ried | Porsche 911 RSR | D | 116 |
| 35 | LMGTE | 77 | (Germany) Proton Competition | (Germany) Marvin Dienst (Norway) Dennis Olsen (Germany) Christian Ried | Porsche 4.0 L Flat-6 | D | 116 |
| 36 | LMP3 | 5 | (Spain) NEFIS By Speed Factory | (Russia) Timur Boguslavskiy (Ukraine) Aleksey Chuklin (Russia) Daniil Pronenko | Ligier JS P3 | MI | 115 |
| 36 | LMP3 | 5 | (Spain) NEFIS By Speed Factory | (Russia) Timur Boguslavskiy (Ukraine) Aleksey Chuklin (Russia) Daniil Pronenko | Nissan VK50VE 5.0 L V8 | MI | 115 |
| 37 | LMP2 | 25 | (Portugal) Algarve Pro Racing | (United States) Mark Patterson (Philippines) Ate De Jong (South Korea) Tacksung Kim | Ligier JS P217 | D | 111 |
| 37 | LMP2 | 25 | (Portugal) Algarve Pro Racing | (United States) Mark Patterson (Philippines) Ate De Jong (South Korea) Tacksung Kim | Gibson GK428 4.2 L V8 | D | 111 |
| 38 | LMGTE | 54 | (Switzerland) Spirit of Race | (Italy) Francesco Castellacci (Switzerland) Thomas Flohr | Ferrari 488 GTE | D | 107 |
| 38 | LMGTE | 54 | (Switzerland) Spirit of Race | (Italy) Francesco Castellacci (Switzerland) Thomas Flohr | Ferrari F154CB 3.9 L Turbo V8 | D | 107 |
| NC | LMP2 | 35 | (Russia) SMP Racing | (Russia) Matevos Isaakyan (Russia) Egor Orudzhev (Russia) Viktor Shaytar | Dallara P217 | D | 121 |
| NC | LMP2 | 35 | (Russia) SMP Racing | (Russia) Matevos Isaakyan (Russia) Egor Orudzhev (Russia) Viktor Shaytar | Gibson GK428 4.2 L V8 | D | 121 |
| Ret | LMP3 | 17 | (France) Ultimate | (France) François Hériau (France) Jean-Baptiste Lahaye (France) Matthieu Lahaye | Norma M30 | MI | 83 |
| Ret | LMP3 | 17 | (France) Ultimate | (France) François Hériau (France) Jean-Baptiste Lahaye (France) Matthieu Lahaye | Nissan VK50VE 5.0 L V8 | MI | 83 |
| Ret | LMP2 | 27 | (France) IDEC Sport | (France) William Cavailhes (France) Patrice Lafargue (France) Erik Maris | Ligier JS P217 | MI | 77 |
| Ret | LMP2 | 27 | (France) IDEC Sport | (France) William Cavailhes (France) Patrice Lafargue (France) Erik Maris | Gibson GK428 4.2 L V8 | MI | 77 |
| Ret | LMP2 | 21 | (United States) DragonSpeed | (United Kingdom) Ben Hanley (Sweden) Henrik Hedman (France) Nicolas Lapierre | Oreca 07 | MI | 62 |
| Ret | LMP2 | 21 | (United States) DragonSpeed | (United Kingdom) Ben Hanley (Sweden) Henrik Hedman (France) Nicolas Lapierre | Gibson GK428 4.2 L V8 | MI | 62 |
| Ret | LMGTE | 55 | (Switzerland) Spirit of Race | (United Kingdom) Duncan Cameron (Republic of Ireland) Matt Griffin (United Kingdom) Aaron Scott | Ferrari 488 GTE | D | 54 |
| Ret | LMGTE | 55 | (Switzerland) Spirit of Race | (United Kingdom) Duncan Cameron (Republic of Ireland) Matt Griffin (United Kingdom) Aaron Scott | Ferrari F154CB 3.9 L Turbo V8 | D | 54 |
| Ret | LMGTE | 86 | (United Kingdom) Gulf Racing | (United Kingdom) Ben Barker (Australia) Alex Davison (United Kingdom) Michael Wainwright | Porsche 911 RSR | D | 45 |
| Ret | LMGTE | 86 | (United Kingdom) Gulf Racing | (United Kingdom) Ben Barker (Australia) Alex Davison (United Kingdom) Michael Wainwright | Porsche 4.0 L Flat-6 | D | 45 |
| Ret | LMP3 | 8 | (Luxembourg) DKR Engineering | (Belgium) Jean Glorieux (Spain) Alexander Toril (Spain) Miguel Toril | Norma M30 | MI | 11 |
| Ret | LMP3 | 8 | (Luxembourg) DKR Engineering | (Belgium) Jean Glorieux (Spain) Alexander Toril (Spain) Miguel Toril | Nissan VK50VE 5.0 L V8 | MI | 11 |

Notes

- **^2** – The No° 11 Eurointernational Ligier JS P3 was issued with a 30-second time penalty due to a stewards' decision.

European Le Mans Series
| Previous race: None | 2018 season | Next race: 4 Hours of Monza |
