= 2018 4 Hours of Monza =

The Autodromo Nazionale Monza

The 2018 4 Hours of Monza was an endurance motor race that took place at the Autodromo Nazionale Monza near Monza, Italy between 11 and 13 May 2018, and served as the second round of the 2018 European Le Mans Series.

The overall race victory was taken by the LMP2-class Oreca 07 of G-Drive Racing, with Andrea Pizzitola, Roman Rusinov and Jean-Éric Vergne winning one week after the same driver line-up took LMP2 class victory in the 6 Hours of Spa-Francorchamps.

== Qualifying ==
=== Qualifying result ===
Pole position winners in each class are in bold.

Pos.	Class	No°	Team	Chassis	Time	Grid
1	**LMP2**	**21**	**(United States) DragonSpeed**	**Oreca 07**	**1:35.837**	**1**
2	LMP2	29	(France) Duqueine Engineering	Oreca 07	1:36.074	2
3	LMP2	26	(Russia) G-Drive Racing	Oreca 07	1:36.183	3
4	LMP2	22	(United States) United Autosports	Ligier JS P217	1:36.414	4
5	LMP2	30	(Spain) AVF by Adrián Vallés	Dallara P217	1:36.614	5
6	LMP2	40	(Russia) G-Drive Racing	Oreca 07	1:36.641	6
7	LMP2	28	(France) IDEC Sport	Oreca 07	1:36.817	7
8	LMP2	32	(United States) United Autosports	Ligier JS P217	1:37.045	8
9	LMP2	39	(France) Graff	Oreca 07	1:37.065	9
10	LMP2	24	(Spain) Racing Engineering	Oreca 07	1:37.155	10
11	LMP2	23	(France) Panis Barthez Competition	Ligier JS P217	1:37.195	11
12	LMP2	35	(Russia) SMP Racing	Dallara P217	1:37.242	12
13	LMP2	47	(Italy) Cetilar Villorba Corse	Dallara P217	1:37.279	13
14	LMP2	49	(Denmark) High Class Racing	Dallara P217	1:37.678	14
15	LMP2	27	(France) IDEC Sport	Ligier JS P217	1:40.137	15
16	LMP2	25	(Portugal) Algarve Pro Racing	Ligier JS P217	1:41.523	16
17	LMP2	33	(France) TDS Racing	Oreca 07	No Time	17^{1}
18	LMP2	31	(Portugal) APR - Rebellion Racing	Oreca 07	No Time	18^{1}
19	**LMP3**	**17**	**(France) Ultimate**	**Norma M30**	**1:45.386**	**19**
20	LMP3	19	(France) M.Racing - YMR	Norma M30	1:45.610	20
21	LMP3	2	(United States) United Autosports	Ligier JS P3	1:45.677	21
22	LMP3	15	(United Kingdom) RLR Msport	Ligier JS P3	1:45.744	22
23	LMP3	10	(Italy) Oregon Team	Norma M30	1:45.910	23
24	LMP3	11	(United States) Eurointernational	Ligier JS P3	1:46.161	24
25	LMP3	5	(Spain) NEFIS By Speed Factory	Ligier JS P3	1:46.222	25
26	LMP3	8	(Luxembourg) DKR Engineering	Norma M30	1:46.272	26
27	LMP3	20	Racing For Poland	Ligier JS P3	1:46.444	27
28	LMP3	6	(United Kingdom) 360 Racing	Ligier JS P3	1:46.586	28
29	LMP3	4	(Switzerland) Cool Racing	Ligier JS P3	1:46.590	29
30	LMP3	3	(United States) United Autosports	Ligier JS P3	1:46.805	30
31	LMP3	7	(United Kingdom) Ecurie Ecosse/Nielsen	Ligier JS P3	1:46.846	31
32	LMP3	18	(France) M.Racing - YMR	Ligier JS P3	1:46.860	32
33	LMP3	13	(Poland) Inter Europol Competition	Ligier JS P3	1:46.890	33
34	LMP3	14	(Poland) Inter Europol Competition	Ligier JS P3	1:46.981	34
35	**LMGTE**	**80**	**(Italy) Ebimotors**	**Porsche 911 RSR**	**1:47.493**	**35**
36	LMGTE	88	(Germany) Proton Competition	Porsche 911 RSR	1:47.511	36
37	LMGTE	55	(Switzerland) Spirit of Race	Ferrari 488 GTE	1:47.574	37
38	LMP3	16	(United Kingdom) BHK Motorsport	Ligier JS P3	1:47.827	38
39	LMGTE	83	(United States) Krohn Racing	Ferrari 488 GTE	1:47.878	39
40	LMGTE	77	(Germany) Proton Competition	Porsche 911 RSR	1:48.199	40
41	LMP3	9	(Austria) AT Racing	Ligier JS P3	No Time	41^{2}
42	LMGTE	66	(United Kingdom) JMW Motorsport	Ferrari 488 GTE	No Time	42^{2}

Notes

- **^1** – The No° 33 TDS Racing Oreca 07 and the No° 31 APR - Rebellion Racing Oreca 07 originally qualified in first and third places respectively in the overall classification but had all lap times deleted and were demoted to the back of the LMP2 grid due to a breach of the technical regulations.
- **^2** – The No° 9 AT Racing Ligier JS P3 and the No° 66 JMW Motorsport Ferrari 488 GTE were both demoted to the back of the grid due to a stewards' decision.

== Race ==
=== Race result ===
Class winners are in bold and ‡.

Pos.	Class	No°	Team	Drivers	Chassis	Tyre	Laps
Pos.	Class	No°	Team	Drivers	Engine	Tyre	Laps
1	**LMP2**	**26**	**(Russia) G-Drive Racing**	**(France) Andrea Pizzitola (Russia) Roman Rusinov (France) Jean-Éric Vergne**	**Oreca 07**	D	**124‡**
1	**LMP2**	**26**	**(Russia) G-Drive Racing**	**(France) Andrea Pizzitola (Russia) Roman Rusinov (France) Jean-Éric Vergne**	**Gibson GK428 4.2 L V8**	D	**124‡**
2	LMP2	33	(France) TDS Racing	(France) Loïc Duval (France) François Perrodo (France) Matthieu Vaxivière	Oreca 07	D	124
2	LMP2	33	(France) TDS Racing	(France) Loïc Duval (France) François Perrodo (France) Matthieu Vaxivière	Gibson GK428 4.2 L V8	D	124
3	LMP2	28	(France) IDEC Sport	(France) Paul-Loup Chatin (France) Paul Lafargue (Mexico) Memo Rojas	Oreca 07	MI	124
3	LMP2	28	(France) IDEC Sport	(France) Paul-Loup Chatin (France) Paul Lafargue (Mexico) Memo Rojas	Gibson GK428 4.2 L V8	MI	124
4	LMP2	21	(United States) DragonSpeed	(United Kingdom) Ben Hanley (Sweden) Henrik Hedman (France) Nicolas Lapierre	Oreca 07	MI	124
4	LMP2	21	(United States) DragonSpeed	(United Kingdom) Ben Hanley (Sweden) Henrik Hedman (France) Nicolas Lapierre	Gibson GK428 4.2 L V8	MI	124
5	LMP2	24	(Spain) Racing Engineering	(France) Norman Nato (France) Paul Petit (France) Olivier Pla	Oreca 07	D	124
5	LMP2	24	(Spain) Racing Engineering	(France) Norman Nato (France) Paul Petit (France) Olivier Pla	Gibson GK428 4.2 L V8	D	124
6	LMP2	29	(France) Duqueine Engineering	(France) Nico Jamin (France) Nelson Panciatici (France) Pierre Ragues	Oreca 07	MI	124
6	LMP2	29	(France) Duqueine Engineering	(France) Nico Jamin (France) Nelson Panciatici (France) Pierre Ragues	Gibson GK428 4.2 L V8	MI	124
7	LMP2	23	(France) Panis Barthez Competition	(France) Timothé Buret (France) Julien Canal (United Kingdom) Will Stevens	Ligier JS P217	MI	124
7	LMP2	23	(France) Panis Barthez Competition	(France) Timothé Buret (France) Julien Canal (United Kingdom) Will Stevens	Gibson GK428 4.2 L V8	MI	124
8^{6}	LMP2	31	(Portugal) APR - Rebellion Racing	(United Kingdom) Ryan Cullen (United States) Gustavo Menezes (United Kingdom) Harrison Newey	Oreca 07	D	124
8^{6}	LMP2	31	(Portugal) APR - Rebellion Racing	(United Kingdom) Ryan Cullen (United States) Gustavo Menezes (United Kingdom) Harrison Newey	Gibson GK428 4.2 L V8	D	124
9	LMP2	47	(Italy) Cetilar Villorba Corse	(Italy) Roberto Lacorte (Brazil) Felipe Nasr (Italy) Giorgio Sernagiotto	Dallara P217	D	123
9	LMP2	47	(Italy) Cetilar Villorba Corse	(Italy) Roberto Lacorte (Brazil) Felipe Nasr (Italy) Giorgio Sernagiotto	Gibson GK428 4.2 L V8	D	123
10	LMP2	22	(United States) United Autosports	(Portugal) Filipe Albuquerque (United Kingdom) Philip Hanson	Ligier JS P217	D	123
10	LMP2	22	(United States) United Autosports	(Portugal) Filipe Albuquerque (United Kingdom) Philip Hanson	Gibson GK428 4.2 L V8	D	123
11	LMP2	32	(United States) United Autosports	(United Kingdom) Wayne Boyd (United States) Will Owen (Switzerland) Hugo de Sadeleer	Ligier JS P217	D	123
11	LMP2	32	(United States) United Autosports	(United Kingdom) Wayne Boyd (United States) Will Owen (Switzerland) Hugo de Sadeleer	Gibson GK428 4.2 L V8	D	123
12	LMP2	27	(France) IDEC Sport	(France) William Cavailhes (France) Patrice Lafargue (France) Erik Maris	Ligier JS P217	MI	120
12	LMP2	27	(France) IDEC Sport	(France) William Cavailhes (France) Patrice Lafargue (France) Erik Maris	Gibson GK428 4.2 L V8	MI	120
13	LMP2	25	(Portugal) Algarve Pro Racing	(Philippines) Ate De Jong (South Korea) Tacksung Kim (United States) Mark Patterson	Ligier JS P217	D	120
13	LMP2	25	(Portugal) Algarve Pro Racing	(Philippines) Ate De Jong (South Korea) Tacksung Kim (United States) Mark Patterson	Gibson GK428 4.2 L V8	D	120
14	**LMP3**	**11**	**(United States) Eurointernational**	**(Italy) Giorgio Mondini (Netherlands) Kay van Berlo**	**Ligier JS P3**	MI	**118‡**
14	**LMP3**	**11**	**(United States) Eurointernational**	**(Italy) Giorgio Mondini (Netherlands) Kay van Berlo**	**Nissan VK50VE 5.0 L V8**	MI	**118‡**
15	LMP3	6	(United Kingdom) 360 Racing	(United Kingdom) Ross Kaiser (United Kingdom) James Swift (United Kingdom) Terrence Woodward	Ligier JS P3	MI	117
15	LMP3	6	(United Kingdom) 360 Racing	(United Kingdom) Ross Kaiser (United Kingdom) James Swift (United Kingdom) Terrence Woodward	Nissan VK50VE 5.0 L V8	MI	117
16	LMP3	3	(United States) United Autosports	(United Kingdom) Matthew Bell (Canada) Garett Grist (United Kingdom) Anthony Wells	Ligier JS P3	MI	117
16	LMP3	3	(United States) United Autosports	(United Kingdom) Matthew Bell (Canada) Garett Grist (United Kingdom) Anthony Wells	Nissan VK50VE 5.0 L V8	MI	117
17	LMP3	13	(Poland) Inter Europol Competition	(Germany) Martin Hippe (Poland) Jakub Śmiechowski	Ligier JS P3	MI	117
17	LMP3	13	(Poland) Inter Europol Competition	(Germany) Martin Hippe (Poland) Jakub Śmiechowski	Nissan VK50VE 5.0 L V8	MI	117
18	LMP3	2	(United States) United Autosports	(United States) John Falb (United States) Sean Rayhall	Ligier JS P3	MI	117
18	LMP3	2	(United States) United Autosports	(United States) John Falb (United States) Sean Rayhall	Nissan VK50VE 5.0 L V8	MI	117
19	LMP3	5	(Spain) NEFIS By Speed Factory	(Russia) Timur Boguslavskiy (Ukraine) Aleksey Chuklin (Russia) Daniil Pronenko	Ligier JS P3	MI	117
19	LMP3	5	(Spain) NEFIS By Speed Factory	(Russia) Timur Boguslavskiy (Ukraine) Aleksey Chuklin (Russia) Daniil Pronenko	Nissan VK50VE 5.0 L V8	MI	117
20	LMP3	17	(France) Ultimate	(France) François Hériau (France) Jean-Baptiste Lahaye (France) Matthieu Lahaye	Norma M30	MI	116
20	LMP3	17	(France) Ultimate	(France) François Hériau (France) Jean-Baptiste Lahaye (France) Matthieu Lahaye	Nissan VK50VE 5.0 L V8	MI	116
21	**LMGTE**	**55**	**(Switzerland) Spirit of Race**	**(United Kingdom) Duncan Cameron (Republic of Ireland) Matt Griffin (United Kingdom) Aaron Scott**	**Ferrari 488 GTE**	D	**116‡**
21	**LMGTE**	**55**	**(Switzerland) Spirit of Race**	**(United Kingdom) Duncan Cameron (Republic of Ireland) Matt Griffin (United Kingdom) Aaron Scott**	**Ferrari F154CB 3.9 L Turbo V8**	D	**116‡**
22	LMP3	10	(Italy) Oregon Team	(France) Clément Mateu (Colombia) Andrés Méndez (Italy) Riccardo Ponzio	Norma M30	MI	116
22	LMP3	10	(Italy) Oregon Team	(France) Clément Mateu (Colombia) Andrés Méndez (Italy) Riccardo Ponzio	Nissan VK50VE 5.0 L V8	MI	116
23	LMP3	4	(Switzerland) Cool Racing	(Switzerland) Iradj Alexander (Switzerland) Antonin Borga (Switzerland) Alexandre Coigny	Ligier JS P3	MI	116
23	LMP3	4	(Switzerland) Cool Racing	(Switzerland) Iradj Alexander (Switzerland) Antonin Borga (Switzerland) Alexandre Coigny	Nissan VK50VE 5.0 L V8	MI	116
24	LMGTE	77	(Germany) Proton Competition	(Germany) Marvin Dienst (Germany) Marc Lieb (Germany) Christian Ried	Porsche 911 RSR	D	116
24	LMGTE	77	(Germany) Proton Competition	(Germany) Marvin Dienst (Germany) Marc Lieb (Germany) Christian Ried	Porsche 4.0 L Flat-6	D	116
25	LMGTE	80	(Italy) EbiMotors	(Italy) Fabio Babini (France) Raymond Narac (Italy) Riccardo Pera	Porsche 911 RSR	D	116
25	LMGTE	80	(Italy) EbiMotors	(Italy) Fabio Babini (France) Raymond Narac (Italy) Riccardo Pera	Porsche 4.0 L Flat-6	D	116
26^{3}	LMP3	7	(United Kingdom) Ecurie Ecosse/Nielsen	(United Kingdom) Alex Kapadia (United Kingdom) Colin Noble (Denmark) Christian Stubbe Olsen	Ligier JS P3	MI	116
26^{3}	LMP3	7	(United Kingdom) Ecurie Ecosse/Nielsen	(United Kingdom) Alex Kapadia (United Kingdom) Colin Noble (Denmark) Christian Stubbe Olsen	Nissan VK50VE 5.0 L V8	MI	116
27	LMP3	15	(United Kingdom) RLR Msport	(Canada) John Farano (United Kingdom) Rob Garofall (Netherlands) Job van Uitert	Ligier JS P3	MI	115
27	LMP3	15	(United Kingdom) RLR Msport	(Canada) John Farano (United Kingdom) Rob Garofall (Netherlands) Job van Uitert	Nissan VK50VE 5.0 L V8	MI	115
28	LMP3	16	(United Kingdom) BHK Motorsport	(Italy) Jacopo Baratto (Italy) Francesco Dracone	Ligier JS P3	MI	115
28	LMP3	16	(United Kingdom) BHK Motorsport	(Italy) Jacopo Baratto (Italy) Francesco Dracone	Nissan VK50VE 5.0 L V8	MI	115
29	LMGTE	66	(United Kingdom) JMW Motorsport	(United Kingdom) Liam Griffin (United Kingdom) Alex MacDowall (Spain) Miguel Molina	Ferrari 488 GTE	D	115
29	LMGTE	66	(United Kingdom) JMW Motorsport	(United Kingdom) Liam Griffin (United Kingdom) Alex MacDowall (Spain) Miguel Molina	Ferrari F154CB 3.9 L Turbo V8	D	115
30	LMGTE	88	(Germany) Proton Competition	(Italy) Gianmaria Bruni (Italy) Gianluca Roda (Italy) Giorgio Roda	Porsche 911 RSR	D	115
30	LMGTE	88	(Germany) Proton Competition	(Italy) Gianmaria Bruni (Italy) Gianluca Roda (Italy) Giorgio Roda	Porsche 4.0 L Flat-6	D	115
31	LMGTE	83	(United States) Krohn Racing	(Italy) Andrea Bertolini (Sweden) Niclas Jönsson (United States) Tracy Krohn	Ferrari 488 GTE	D	114
31	LMGTE	83	(United States) Krohn Racing	(Italy) Andrea Bertolini (Sweden) Niclas Jönsson (United States) Tracy Krohn	Ferrari F154CB 3.9 L Turbo V8	D	114
32	LMP3	19	(France) M.Racing - YMR	(Switzerland) David Droux (France) Nicolas Ferrer (Switzerland) Lucas Légeret	Norma M30	MI	113
32	LMP3	19	(France) M.Racing - YMR	(Switzerland) David Droux (France) Nicolas Ferrer (Switzerland) Lucas Légeret	Nissan VK50VE 5.0 L V8	MI	113
33^{5}	LMP3	20	Racing For Poland	(Poland) Tomasz Blicharski (Sweden) Henning Enqvist (Switzerland) Alex Fontana	Ligier JS P3	MI	109
33^{5}	LMP3	20	Racing For Poland	(Poland) Tomasz Blicharski (Sweden) Henning Enqvist (Switzerland) Alex Fontana	Nissan VK50VE 5.0 L V8	MI	109
34	LMP2	49	(Denmark) High Class Racing	(Denmark) Dennis Andersen (Denmark) Anders Fjordbach	Dallara P217	D	104
34	LMP2	49	(Denmark) High Class Racing	(Denmark) Dennis Andersen (Denmark) Anders Fjordbach	Gibson GK428 4.2 L V8	D	104
35^{4}	LMP3	14	(Poland) Inter Europol Competition	(Italy) Luca Demarchi (Germany) Paul Scheuschner (Germany) Hendrik Still	Ligier JS P3	MI	99
35^{4}	LMP3	14	(Poland) Inter Europol Competition	(Italy) Luca Demarchi (Germany) Paul Scheuschner (Germany) Hendrik Still	Nissan VK50VE 5.0 L V8	MI	99
Ret	LMP2	35	(Russia) SMP Racing	(Russia) Matevos Isaakyan (Russia) Egor Orudzhev (Russia) Viktor Shaytar	Dallara P217	D	62
Ret	LMP2	35	(Russia) SMP Racing	(Russia) Matevos Isaakyan (Russia) Egor Orudzhev (Russia) Viktor Shaytar	Gibson GK428 4.2 L V8	D	62
Ret	LMP2	30	(Spain) AVF by Adrián Vallés	(Portugal) Henrique Chaves (Russia) Konstantin Tereshchenko	Dallara P217	D	61
Ret	LMP2	30	(Spain) AVF by Adrián Vallés	(Portugal) Henrique Chaves (Russia) Konstantin Tereshchenko	Gibson GK428 4.2 L V8	D	61
Ret	LMP3	18	(France) M.Racing - YMR	(France) Natan Bihel (France) Laurent Millara	Ligier JS P3	MI	57
Ret	LMP3	18	(France) M.Racing - YMR	(France) Natan Bihel (France) Laurent Millara	Nissan VK50VE 5.0 L V8	MI	57
Ret	LMP3	9	(Austria) AT Racing	(Denmark) Mikkel Jensen (Belarus) Alexander Talkanitsa Jr. (Belarus) Alexander Talkanitsa Sr.	Ligier JS P3	MI	56
Ret	LMP3	9	(Austria) AT Racing	(Denmark) Mikkel Jensen (Belarus) Alexander Talkanitsa Jr. (Belarus) Alexander Talkanitsa Sr.	Nissan VK50VE 5.0 L V8	MI	56
Ret	LMP3	8	(Luxembourg) DKR Engineering	(Belgium) Jean Glorieux (Spain) Alexander Toril (Spain) Miguel Toril	Norma M30	MI	46
Ret	LMP3	8	(Luxembourg) DKR Engineering	(Belgium) Jean Glorieux (Spain) Alexander Toril (Spain) Miguel Toril	Nissan VK50VE 5.0 L V8	MI	46
Ret	LMP2	40	(Russia) G-Drive Racing	(Australia) James Allen (France) Enzo Guibbert (Mexico) José Gutiérrez	Oreca 07	D	19
Ret	LMP2	40	(Russia) G-Drive Racing	(Australia) James Allen (France) Enzo Guibbert (Mexico) José Gutiérrez	Gibson GK428 4.2 L V8	D	19
Ret	LMP2	39	(France) Graff	(France) Alexandre Cougnaud (France) Tristan Gommendy (Switzerland) Jonathan Hirschi	Oreca 07	D	7
Ret	LMP2	39	(France) Graff	(France) Alexandre Cougnaud (France) Tristan Gommendy (Switzerland) Jonathan Hirschi	Gibson GK428 4.2 L V8	D	7
DNS	LMP3	12	(United States) Eurointernational	(Italy) Andrea Dromedari (United States) Max Hanratty (United States) Mark Kvamme	Ligier JS P3	MI	0
DNS	LMP3	12	(United States) Eurointernational	(Italy) Andrea Dromedari (United States) Max Hanratty (United States) Mark Kvamme	Nissan VK50VE 5.0 L V8	MI	0

Notes

- **^3** – The No° 7 Ecurie Ecosse/Nielsen Ligier JS P3 was issued with an 80-second time penalty due to a stewards' decision.
- **^4** – The No° 14 Inter Europol Competition Ligier JS P3 was issued with a 5-lap time penalty due to a stewards' decision.
- **^5** – The No° 20 Racing For Poland Ligier JS P3 was issued with a 2-lap time penalty due to a stewards' decision.
- **^6** – The No° 31 APR - Rebellion Racing Oreca 07 was issued with a 30-second time penalty due to a stewards' decision.

European Le Mans Series
Previous race: 4 Hours of Le Castellet	2018 season	Next race: 4 Hours of Red Bull Ring
