= John Falb =

American racing driver (born 1971)

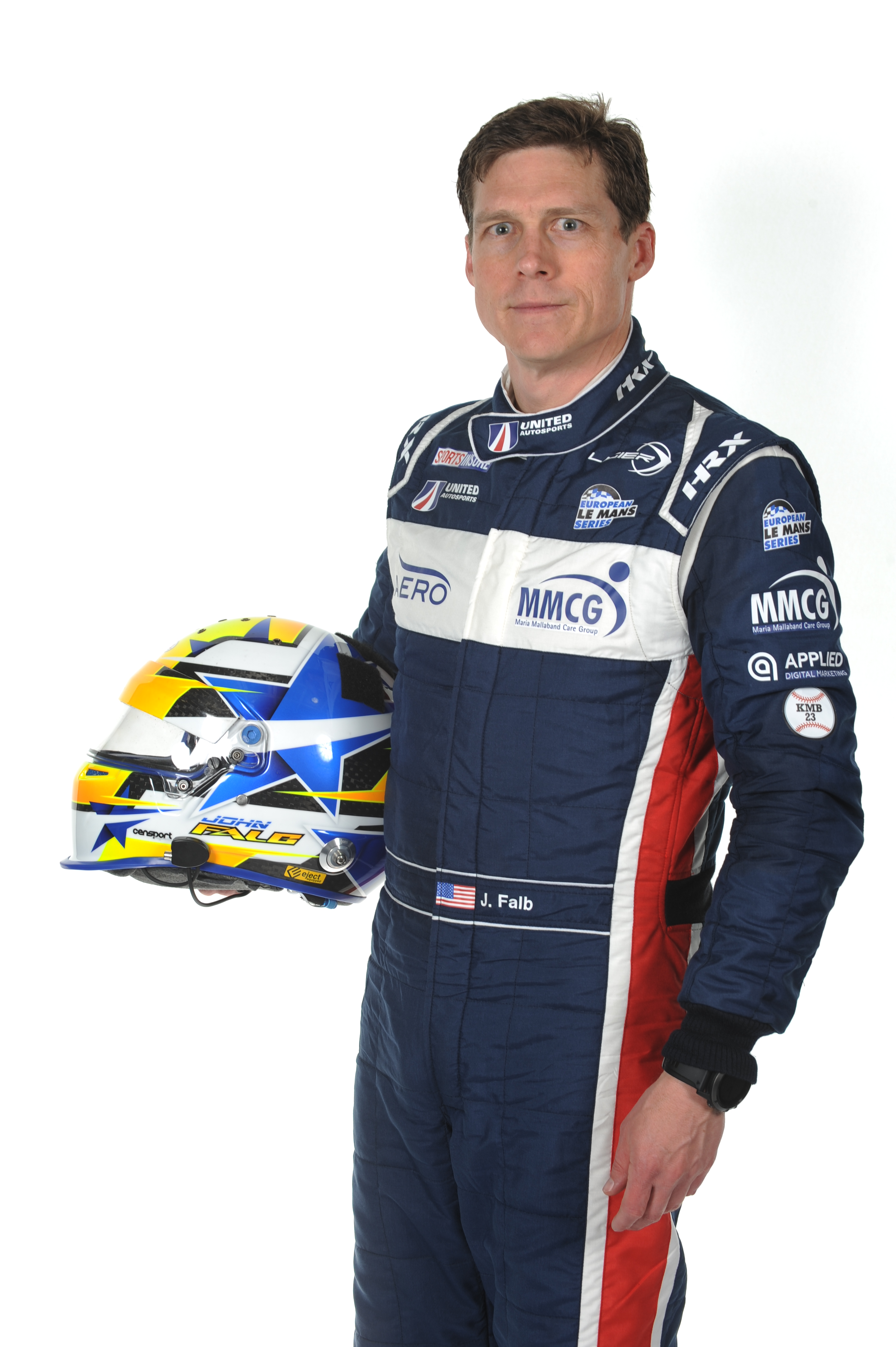
- Falb in 2017
- Nationality: American
- Born: December 13, 1971 (age 54) Dallas, Texas, United States

European Le Mans Series career
- Debut season: 2016
- Current team: Algarve Pro Racing
- Categorisation: FIA Bronze
- Car number: 47
- Starts: 13 (13 entries)
- Wins: 3
- Podiums: 8
- Poles: 0
- Fastest laps: 0
- Best finish: 1st (LMP3) in 2017

Previous series
- 2015–18, 22 2017–18 2014–15: IMSA SportsCar Championship; Le Mans Cup; IMSA Prototype Lites

John Falb (born December 13, 1971) is an American businessman and racing driver competing in the European Le Mans Series in LMP2 for Rossa Racing by Virage.

Falb has been the president of the College Loan Corporation since 2002.

== Racing record ==
=== Racing career summary ===
| Season | Series | Team | Races | Wins | Poles | F/Laps | Podiums | Points | Position |
|---|---|---|---|---|---|---|---|---|---|
| 2014 | IMSA Prototype Lites - L1 | ONE Motorsports | 14 | 0 | 0 | 0 | 2 | 126 | 4th |
| 2014 | Radical European Masters - Supersport | Radical Works Team | 2 | 0 | 0 | 0 | 0 | 0 | NC† |
| 2015 | IMSA Prototype Lites - L1 | ONE Motorsports | 13 | 0 | 0 | 0 | 0 | 140 | 6th |
| 2015 | United SportsCar Championship - Prototype Challenge | BAR1 Motorsports | 2 | 0 | 0 | 0 | 1 | 85 | 17th |
| 2015 | United SportsCar Championship - Prototype Challenge | Starworks Motorsport | 1 | 0 | 0 | 0 | 0 | 85 | 17th |
| 2016 | European Le Mans Series - LMP3 | Graff Racing | 6 | 0 | 0 | 0 | 0 | 24.5 | 11th |
| 2016 | Road to Le Mans - LMP3 | Graff Racing | 1 | 0 | 0 | 0 | 1 | N/A | **3rd** |
| 2016 | IMSA SportsCar Championship - Prototype Challenge | BAR1 Motorsports | 2 | 0 | 0 | 0 | 0 | 52 | 23rd |
| 2017 | European Le Mans Series - LMP3 | United Autosports | 6 | 2 | 0 | 0 | 5 | 103 | **1st** |
| 2017 | Le Mans Cup - LMP3 | United Autosports | 2 | 1 | 0 | 0 | 2 | 24 | 11th |
| 2017 | IMSA SportsCar Championship - Prototype Challenge | Starworks Motorsport | 2 | 1 | 0 | 0 | 1 | 61 | 12th |
| 2018 | European Le Mans Series - LMP3 | United Autosports | 6 | 1 | 0 | 0 | 2 | 53.5 | 6th |
| 2018 | Le Mans Cup - LMP3 | United Autosports | 2 | 0 | 0 | 0 | 2 | 18 | 17th |
| 2018 | IMSA SportsCar Championship - GTD | HART | 1 | 0 | 0 | 0 | 0 | 15 | 67th |
| 2019 | European Le Mans Series - LMP2 | Algarve Pro Racing | 6 | 0 | 0 | 0 | 0 | 28 | 14th |
| 2019 | 24 Hours of Le Mans - LMP2 | Algarve Pro Racing | 1 | 0 | 0 | 0 | 0 | N/A | 10th |
| 2020 | European Le Mans Series - LMP2 | Algarve Pro Racing | 5 | 0 | 0 | 0 | 0 | 19.5 | 12th |
| 2020 | 24 Hours of Le Mans - LMP2 | Algarve Pro Racing | 1 | 0 | 0 | 0 | 0 | N/A | 7th |
| 2021 | Asian Le Mans Series - LMP2 | G-Drive Racing | 4 | 0 | 1 | 0 | 3 | 66 | **3rd** |
| 2021 | European Le Mans Series - LMP2 | G-Drive Racing | 6 | 0 | 0 | 0 | 1 | 42 | 8th |
| 2021 | FIA World Endurance Championship - LMP2 | G-Drive Racing | 1 | 0 | 0 | 0 | 0 | 0 | NC† |
| 2021 | 24 Hours of Le Mans - LMP2 | G-Drive Racing | 1 | 0 | 0 | 0 | 0 | N/A | DNF |
| 2021 | Le Mans Cup - LMP3 | Revere Racing | 1 | 0 | 0 | 0 | 0 | 0 | NC† |
| 2021 | Le Mans Cup - LMP3 | Mühlner Motorsport | 1 | 0 | 0 | 0 | 0 | 0 | NC† |
| 2022 | European Le Mans Series - LMP2 | Algarve Pro Racing | 6 | 0 | 0 | 0 | 0 | 7 | 21st |
| 2022 | 24 Hours of Le Mans - LMP2 | Algarve Pro Racing | 1 | 0 | 0 | 0 | 0 | N/A | 20th |
| 2022 | IMSA SportsCar Championship - LMP2 | G-Drive Racing by APR | 1 | 0 | 0 | 0 | 0 | 0 | NC† |
| 2023 | Asian Le Mans Series - LMP2 | Algarve Pro Racing | 4 | 1 | 0 | 0 | 1 | 51 | **3rd** |
| 2023 | IMSA SportsCar Championship - LMP2 | TDS Racing | 3 | 0 | 0 | 0 | 2 | 974 | 9th |
| 2023–24 | Asian Le Mans Series - LMP2 | Duqueine Team | 5 | 0 | 0 | 0 | 1 | 29 | 10th |
| 2024 | European Le Mans Series - LMP2 Pro-Am | Nielsen Racing | 6 | 0 | 0 | 0 | 2 | 70 | 5th |
| 2025 | European Le Mans Series - LMP2 Pro-Am | Nielsen Racing | 3 | 0 | 0 | 0 | 1 | 23 | 12th |
| 2025–26 | Asian Le Mans Series - LMP2 | Algarve Pro Racing | 6 | 0 | 0 | 0 | 2 | 45 | 6th |
| 2026 | European Le Mans Series - LMP2 Pro-Am | Rossa Racing by Virage | 6 | 0 | 0 | 0 | 1 | 59 | 6th |

^{†} As Falb was a guest driver, he was ineligible to score points.

=== Complete results ===
(key) (Races in bold indicate pole position; results in italics indicate fastest lap)

| Year | Entrant | Class | Chassis | Engine | 1 | 2 | 3 | 4 | 5 | 6 | 7 | 8 | 9 | 10 | 11 | Rank | Points | Ref |
|---|---|---|---|---|---|---|---|---|---|---|---|---|---|---|---|---|---|---|
| 2015 | BAR1 Motorsports | PC | Oreca FLM09 | Chevrolet LS3 6.2 L V8 | DAY | SEB | LGA; 5 | BEL | WGL | MOS; 2 | LIM | ELK | COA; DNS | | | 17th | 85 | |
| 2015 | Starworks Motorsport | PC | Oreca FLM09 | Chevrolet LS3 6.2 L V8 | | | | | | | | | | PET; 7 | | 17th | 85 | |
| 2016 | BAR1 Motorsports | PC | Oreca FLM09 | Chevrolet LS3 6.2 L V8 | DAY; 5 | SEB | LBH | LGA | BEL | WGL | MOS | LIM | ELK | AUS; 7 | PET | 23rd | 52 | |
| 2017 | Starworks Motorsport | PC | Oreca FLM09 | Chevrolet LS3 6.2 L V8 | DAY; 5 | SEB | AUS | DET | WAT | MOS | ELK | | | | | 12th | 61 | |
| 2017 | BAR1 Motorsports | PC | Oreca FLM09 | Chevrolet LS3 6.2 L V8 | | | | | | | | PET; 1 | | | | 12th | 61 | |
| 2018 | HART | GTD | Acura NSX GT3 | Acura 3.5 L Turbo V6 | DAY; 16 | SEB | MOH | DET | WGI | MOS | LRP | ELK | VIR | LAG | PET | 60th | 15 | |
| 2022 | G-Drive Racing by APR | LMP2 | Oreca 07 | Gibson GK428 4.2 L V8 | DAY; 8† | SEB | LGA | MDO | WGL | ELK | PET | | | | | NC† | 0† | |
| 2023 | TDS Racing | LMP2 | Oreca 07 | Gibson GK428 4.2 L V8 | DAY | SEB | LGA | WGL; 4 | ELK; 2 | IMS | PET; 2 | | | | | 9th | 974 | |

^{†} Points only counted towards the Michelin Endurance Cup, and not the overall LMP2 Championship.

=== Complete European Le Mans Series results ===
(key) (Races in bold indicate pole position; results in italics indicate fastest lap)

| Year | Entrant | Class | Chassis | Engine | 1 | 2 | 3 | 4 | 5 | 6 | Rank | Points |
|---|---|---|---|---|---|---|---|---|---|---|---|---|
| 2016 | Graff | LMP3 | Ligier JS P3 | Nissan VK50VE 5.0 L V8 | SIL; 13 | IMO; Ret | RBR; 7 | LEC; Ret | SPA; 7 | EST; 4 | 11th | 24.5 |
| 2017 | United Autosports | LMP3 | Ligier JS P3 | Nissan VK50VE 5.0 L V8 | SIL; 1 | MNZ; 9 | RBR; 2 | LEC; 1 | SPA; 3 | ALG; 2 | 1st | 103 |
| 2018 | United Autosports | LMP3 | Ligier JS P3 | Nissan VK50VE 5.0 L V8 | LEC; 5 | MNZ; 5 | RBR; Ret | SIL; 7 | SPA; 1 | ALG; 3 | 6th | 53.5 |
| 2019 | Algarve Pro Racing | LMP2 | Oreca 07 | Gibson GK428 4.2 L V8 | LEC; 14 | MNZ; 12 | CAT; 6 | SIL; 6 | SPA; 10 | ALG; 5 | 14th | 28 |
| 2020 | Algarve Pro Racing | LMP2 | Oreca 07 | Gibson GK428 4.2 L V8 | LEC; 10 | SPA; 9 | LEC; 5 | MNZ; 11 | ALG; 8 | | 12th | 19.5 |
| 2021 | G-Drive Racing | LMP2 | Aurus 01 | Gibson GK428 4.2 L V8 | CAT; 7 | RBR; 3 | LEC; 10 | MNZ; 6 | SPA; 7 | ALG; 8 | 8th | 42 |
| 2021 | G-Drive Racing | Pro-Am Cup | Aurus 01 | Gibson GK428 4.2 L V8 | 2 | 1 | 2 | 1 | 2 | 2 | 1st | 122 |
| 2022 | Algarve Pro Racing | LMP2 | Oreca 07 | Gibson GK428 4.2 L V8 | LEC; 17 | IMO; 15 | MNZ; 9 | CAT; 8 | SPA; 10 | ALG; Ret | 21st | 7 |
| 2022 | Algarve Pro Racing | Pro-Am Cup | Oreca 07 | Gibson GK428 4.2 L V8 | 7 | 6 | 3 | 3 | 3 | Ret | 6th | 59 |
| 2024 | Nielsen Racing | LMP2 Pro-Am | Oreca 07 | Gibson GK428 4.2 L V8 | CAT; 3 | LEC; 5 | IMO; 6 | SPA; 4 | MUG; 5 | ALG; 3 | 5th | 70 |
| 2025 | Nielsen Racing | LMP2 Pro-Am | Oreca 07 | Gibson GK428 4.2 L V8 | CAT | LEC | IMO | SPA; Ret | SIL; 6 | ALG; 3 | 12th | 23 |
| 2026 | Rossa Racing by Virage | LMP2 Pro-Am | Oreca 07 | Gibson GK428 4.2 L V8 | CAT; 5 | LEC; 7 | IMO; 4 | SPA; 6 | SIL; 3 | ALG; 6 | 6th | 59 |

=== Complete Asian Le Mans Series results ===
(key) (Races in bold indicate pole position) (Races in italics indicate fastest lap)

| Year | Team | Class | Car | Engine | 1 | 2 | 3 | 4 | 5 | 6 | Pos. | Points |
|---|---|---|---|---|---|---|---|---|---|---|---|---|
| 2021 | G-Drive Racing | LMP2 | Aurus 01 | Gibson GK428 4.2 L V8 | DUB; 1; 4 | DUB; 2; 2 | ABU; 1; 3 | ABU; 2; 2 | | | 3rd | 66 |
| 2023 | Algarve Pro Racing | LMP2 | Oreca 07 | Gibson GK428 4.2 L V8 | DUB; 1; 1 | DUB; 2; 4 | ABU; 1; 9 | ABU; 2; 4 | | | 3rd | 51 |
| 2023–24 | Duqueine Team | LMP2 | Oreca 07 | Gibson GK428 4.2 L V8 | SEP; 1; 11 | SEP; 2; 7 | DUB; Ret | ABU; 1; 6 | ABU; 2; 3 | | 10th | 29 |
| 2025–26 | Algarve Pro Racing | LMP2 | Oreca 07 | Gibson GK428 4.2 L V8 | SEP; 1; 13 | SEP; 2; 13 | DUB; 1; 13 | DUB; 2; 3 | ABU; 1; 2 | ABU; 2; 4 | 6th | 45 |

=== Complete 24 Hours of Le Mans results ===
| Year | Team | Co-Drivers | Car | Class | Laps | Pos. | Class pos. |
|---|---|---|---|---|---|---|---|
| 2019 | (Portugal) Algarve Pro Racing | (France) Andrea Pizzitola (France) David Zollinger | Oreca 07-Gibson | LMP2 | 357 | 15th | 10th |
| 2020 | (Portugal) Algarve Pro Racing | (United States) Matt McMurry (Switzerland) Simon Trummer | Oreca 07-Gibson | LMP2 | 365 | 11th | 7th |
| 2021 | G-Drive Racing | (Portugal) Rui Andrade (Spain) Roberto Merhi | Aurus 01-Gibson | LMP2 | 108 | DNF | DNF |
| 2021 | G-Drive Racing | (Portugal) Rui Andrade (Spain) Roberto Merhi | Aurus 01-Gibson | LMP2 Pro-Am | 108 | DNF | DNF |
| 2022 | (Portugal) Algarve Pro Racing | (United Kingdom) Jack Aitken (Germany) Sophia Flörsch | Oreca 07-Gibson | LMP2 | 361 | 25th | 21st |
| 2022 | (Portugal) Algarve Pro Racing | (United Kingdom) Jack Aitken (Germany) Sophia Flörsch | Oreca 07-Gibson | LMP2 Pro-Am | 361 | 25th | 5th |
| 2024 | (France) Duqueine Team | (Australia) James Allen (France) Jean-Baptiste Simmenauer | Oreca 07-Gibson | LMP2 | 112 | DNF | DNF |
| 2024 | (France) Duqueine Team | (Australia) James Allen (France) Jean-Baptiste Simmenauer | Oreca 07-Gibson | LMP2 Pro-Am | 112 | DNF | DNF |
