= TDS Racing =

French motorsports team

(France) TDS Racing
- Founded: 2004
- Founder(s): Xavier Combet; Jacques Morello
- Base: Saint-Aunès, France
- Team principal(s): Xavier Combet
- Current series: IMSA SportsCar Championship; European Le Mans Series
- Former series: FIA World Endurance Championship; Eurocup Mégane Trophy; Blancpain Endurance Series
- Teams' Championships: Eurocup Mégane Trophy: 2009, 2010; European Le Mans Series: LMP2 2012, GTC 2015
- Drivers' Championships: Eurocup Mégane Trophy: 2008: Michaël Rossi; 2010: Nick Catsburg; European Le Mans Series: LMP2 2012: Mathias Beche, Pierre Thiriet; GTC 2015: Eric Dermont, Dino Lunardi, Franck Perera

TDS Racing (Top Drive Services, formerly known as Pouchelon Racing) is a French auto racing team, currently competing in the European Le Mans Series, FIA World Endurance Championship and the 24 Hours of Le Mans.

== History ==
=== Eurocup Mégane Trophy (2005–2013) ===
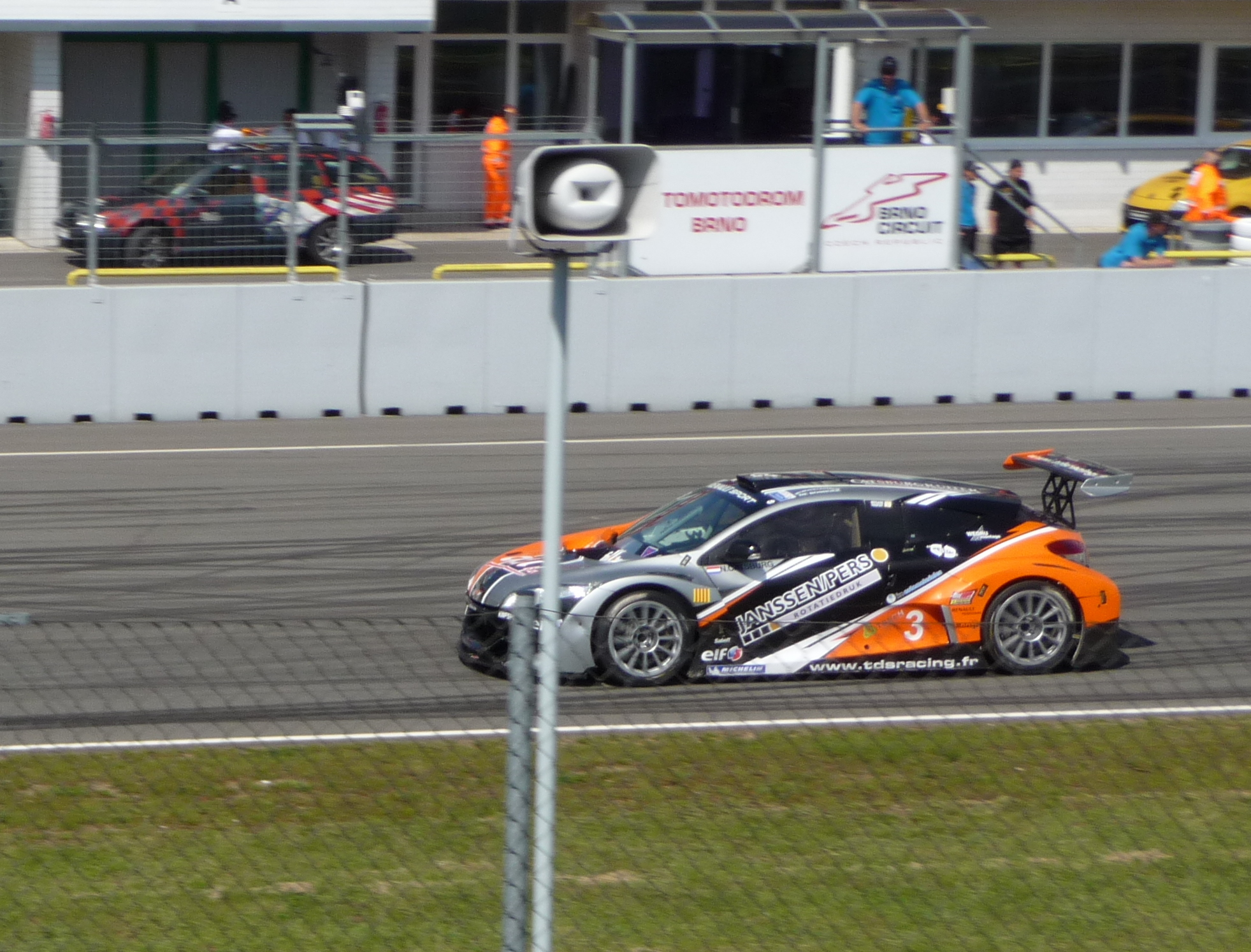
Nick Catsburg at 2010 Eurocup Mégane Trophy Brno round

In 2005, TDS Racing, founded and run by Xavier Combet and Jacques Morello, entered the Eurocup Mégane Trophy for the first time, competing under the Pouchelon Racing banner with Ludovic Badey and Matthieu Cheruy. In the next year the team changed name to TDS. After eight years of running in the Mégane Trophy, the team had scored titles in both drivers' and teams championships. The first championship title was clinched by Michaël Rossi in 2008, who won races at Spa, Hungaroring and Estoril. In 2010, Nick Catsburg became another championship winner.

=== European Le Mans Series (2011–2016) ===
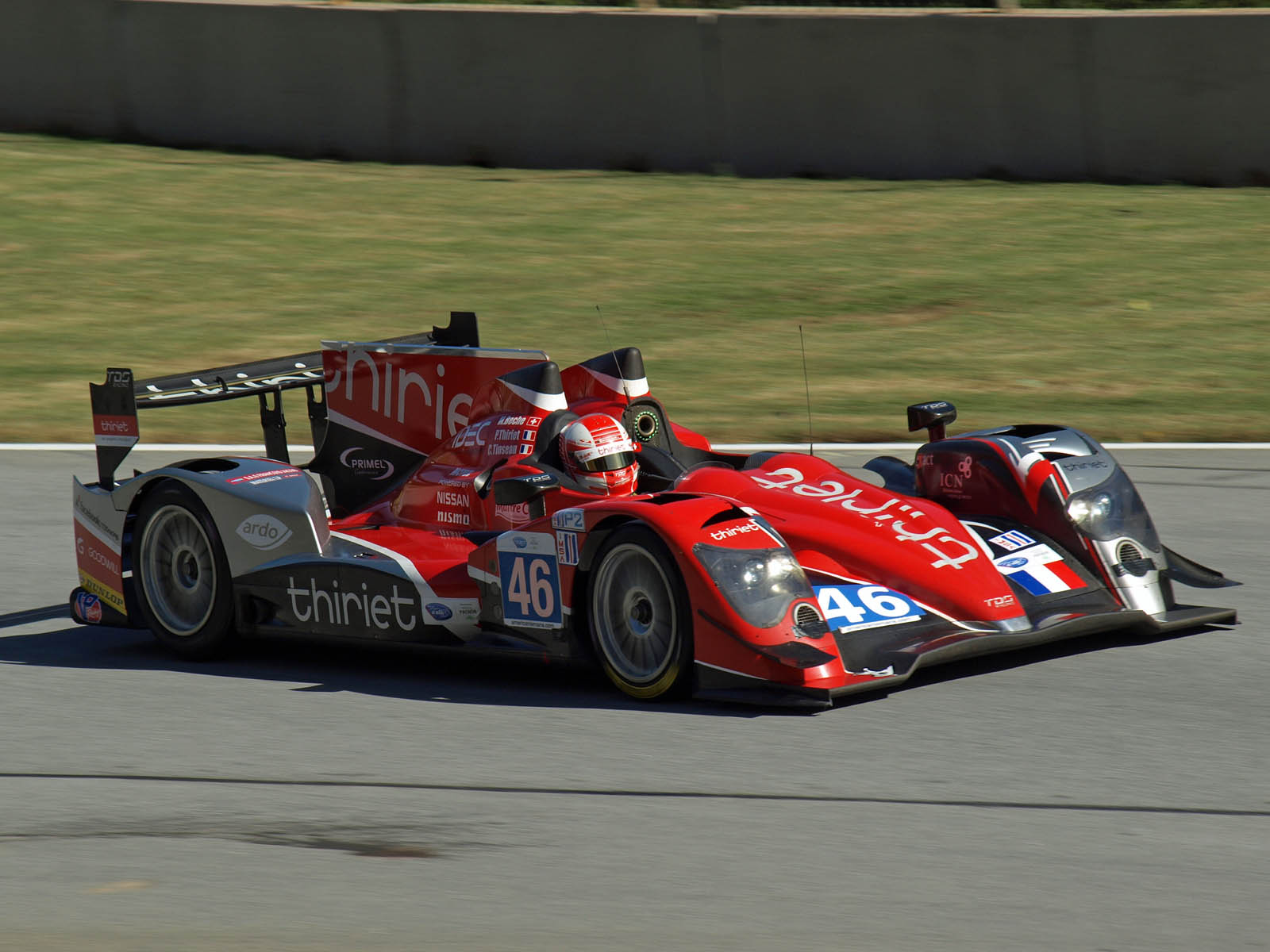
Mathias Beche in Oreca 03-Nissan in Petit Le Mans 2012

In 2011, the team purchased Oreca 03-Nissan car to compete in European Le Mans Series with Mathias Beche, Jody Firth, Pierre Thiriet. The team retained Beche and Thiriet for 2012 and took titles with them in drivers' and teams' championship. The team has competed in BMW Z4 GT3 in the GTC Class in 2015 with Eric Dermont, Dino Lunardi and Franck Perera. They became champions in both drivers' and teams' standings.

=== Blancpain Endurance Series (2013–2015) ===
From 2013 to 2015 TDS Racing competed in Blancpain Endurance Series, using BMW Z4 GT3. 2014 was their most successful season in the series, as the duo of Henry Hassid and Nick Catsburg won races at Circuit Paul Ricard and Nürburgring.

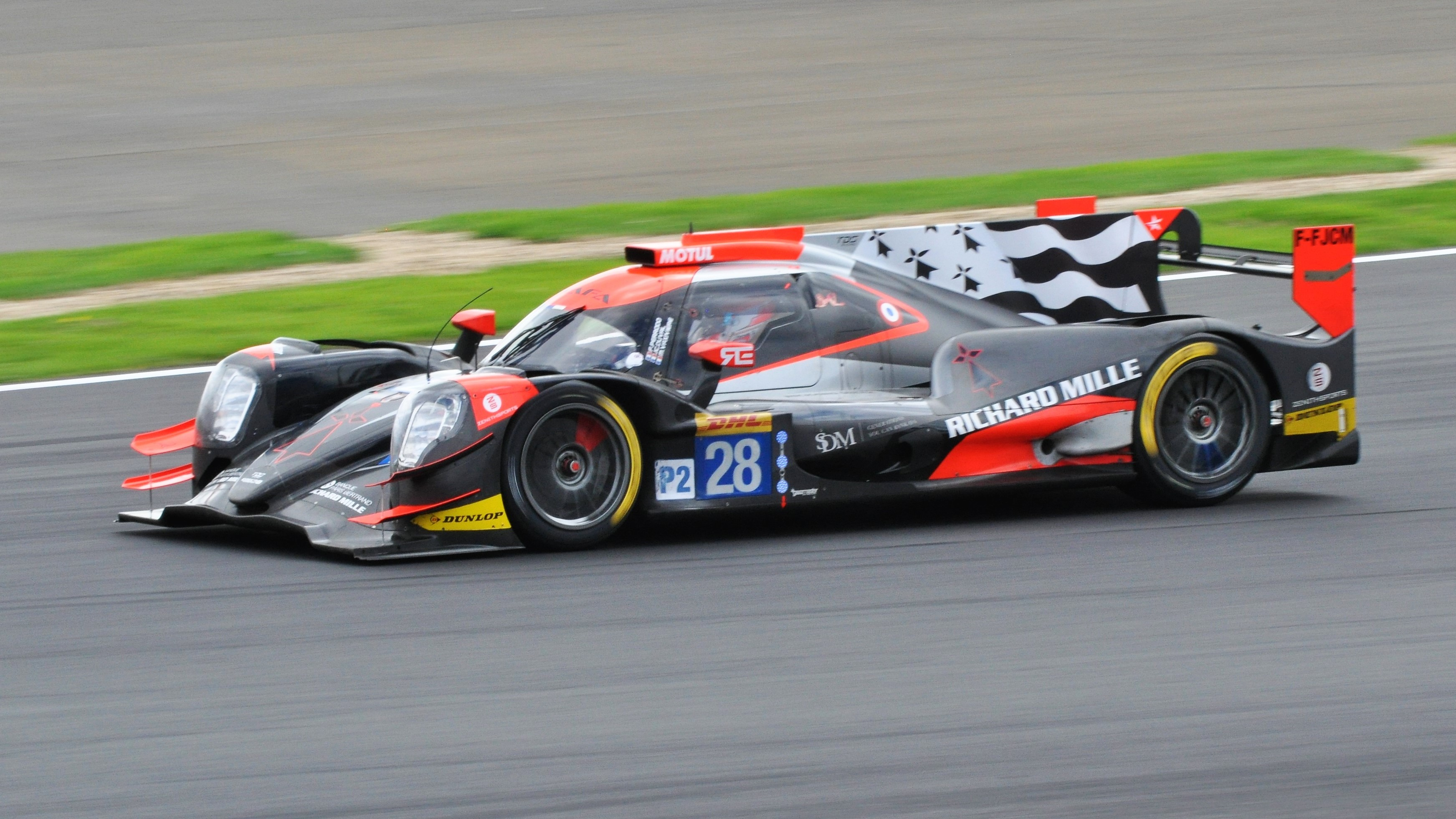
François Perrodo in Oreca 07-Nissan at Silverstone 2018

=== FIA World Endurance Championship (2017–2021) ===
TDS Racing purchased two Oreca 07-Gibson cars and will make debut in the LMP2 class of the FIA World Endurance Championship in 2017. Also the team will field one car under G-Drive Racing banner.

=== IMSA WeatherTech SportsCar Championship (2023–) ===
TDS Racing announced on September 28, 2022 that the team would be making a full-time effort in the LMP2 class of the IMSA WeatherTech SportsCar Championship in 2023.

== Racing record ==
=== 24 Hours of Le Mans results ===
Year	Entrant	No.	Car	Drivers	Class	Laps	Pos.	Class Pos.
2012	(France) Thiriet by TDS Racing	46	Oreca 03-Nissan	(Switzerland) Mathias Beche (France) Pierre Thiriet (France) Christophe Tinseau	LMP2	353	8th	2nd
2013	(France) Thiriet by TDS Racing	46	Oreca 03-Nissan	(France) Ludovic Badey (Belgium) Maxime Martin (France) Pierre Thiriet	LMP2	310	DNF	DNF
2014	(France) Thiriet by TDS Racing	46	Ligier JS P2-Nissan	(France) Ludovic Badey (France) Tristan Gommendy (France) Pierre Thiriet	LMP2	355	6th	2nd
2015	(France) Thiriet by TDS Racing	46	Oreca 05-Nissan	(France) Ludovic Badey (France) Tristan Gommendy (France) Pierre Thiriet	LMP2	204	DNF	DNF
2016	(France) Thiriet by TDS Racing	46	Oreca 05-Nissan	(Switzerland) Mathias Beche (Japan) Ryō Hirakawa (France) Pierre Thiriet	LMP2	241	DNF	DNF
2017	(Russia) G-Drive Racing	26	Oreca 07-Gibson	(United Kingdom) Alex Lynn (Russia) Roman Rusinov (France) Pierre Thiriet	LMP2	20	DNF	DNF
2017	(France) TDS Racing	28	Oreca 07-Gibson	(France) Emmanuel Collard (France) François Perrodo (France) Matthieu Vaxivière	LMP2	213	DNF	DNF
2018	(Russia) G-Drive Racing	26	Oreca 07-Gibson	(France) Andrea Pizzitola (Russia) Roman Rusinov (France) Jean-Éric Vergne	LMP2	369	DSQ	DSQ
2018	(France) TDS Racing	28	Oreca 07-Gibson	(France) Loïc Duval (France) François Perrodo (France) Matthieu Vaxivière	LMP2	365	DSQ	DSQ
2019	(Russia) G-Drive Racing	26	Aurus 01-Gibson	(Russia) Roman Rusinov (Netherlands) Job van Uitert (France) Jean-Éric Vergne	LMP2	364	11th	6th
2019	(France) TDS Racing	28	Oreca 07-Gibson	(France) Loïc Duval (France) François Perrodo (France) Matthieu Vaxivière	LMP2	366	8th	3rd
2020	(Russia) G-Drive Racing	26	Aurus 01-Gibson	(Denmark) Mikkel Jensen (Russia) Roman Rusinov (France) Jean-Éric Vergne	LMP2	367	9th	5th
2020	(Netherlands) Racing Team Nederland	29	Oreca 07-Gibson	(Netherlands) Frits van Eerd (Netherlands) Giedo van der Garde (Netherlands) Nyck de Vries	LMP2	349	19th	15th
2021	(Netherlands) Racing Team Nederland	29	Oreca 07-Gibson	(Netherlands) Frits van Eerd (Netherlands) Giedo van der Garde (Netherlands) Job van Uitert	LMP2 (Pro-Am)	356	16th	2nd
2021	(Switzerland) Realteam Racing	70	Oreca 07-Gibson	(France) Loïc Duval (Switzerland) Esteban García (France) Norman Nato	LMP2 (Pro-Am)	356	17th	3rd
2022	(France) TDS Racing x Vaillante	13	Oreca 07-Gibson	(Switzerland) Mathias Beche (Netherlands) Tijmen van der Helm (Netherlands) Nyck de Vries (Note: De Vries was drafted in as a late replacement for Philippe Cimadomo, who was prohibited from competing after causing multiple incidents in free practice. The change meant the entry was no longer part of the LMP2 Pro-Am subclass.)	LMP2	368	8th	4th
2023	(Canada) Tower Motorsports	13	Oreca 07-Gibson	(Germany) René Rast (United States) Ricky Taylor (United States) Steven Thomas	LMP2 (Pro-Am)	19	DNF	DNF
2024	(France) Panis Racing	65	Oreca 07-Gibson	(Switzerland) Mathias Beche (United States) Scott Huffaker (United States) Rodrigo Sales	LMP2 (Pro-Am)	293	23rd	4th
2025	(France) TDS Racing	29	Oreca 07-Gibson	(Switzerland) Mathias Beche (France) Clément Novalak (United States) Rodrigo Sales	LMP2 (Pro-Am)	365	22nd	2nd
2025	(France) VDS Panis Racing	48	Oreca 07-Gibson	(United Kingdom) Oliver Gray (France) Esteban Masson (France) Franck Perera	LMP2	367	19th	2nd
2026	(France) TDS Racing	14	Oreca 07-Gibson	(Switzerland) Mathias Beche (France) Kévin Estre (Canada) Tobias Lütke	LMP2 (Pro-Am)	355	27th	5th
2026	(France) Forestier Racing by Panis	29	Oreca 07-Gibson	(United Kingdom) Oliver Gray (France) Esteban Masson (France) Louis Rousset	LMP2	360	17th	3rd

=== IMSA SportsCar Championship results ===
Year	Entrant	Class	Chassis	Engine	No	Drivers	1	2	3	4	5	6	7	Pos.	Pts.	EC
2023	(France) TDS Racing	LMP2	Oreca 07	Gibson GK428 4.2 L V8	11	(Denmark) Mikkel Jensen (United States) Steven Thomas (United States) Scott Huffaker 4 (Netherlands) Rinus VeeKay 1	DAY; 10	SEB; 2	LGA; 1	WGI; 7	ELK; 3	IMS; 1	ATL; 8	3rd	1942	34
2023	(France) TDS Racing	LMP2	Oreca 07	Gibson GK428 4.2 L V8	35	(Netherlands) Giedo van der Garde (United States) Josh Pierson 4 (France) François Hériau 3 (United States) John Falb 3 (Netherlands) Job van Uitert 1 (United States) Rodrigo Sales 1	DAY; 4	SEB; 8	LGA; 4	WGI; 4	ELK; 2	IMS; 5	ATL; 2	4th	1832	33
2024	(France) TDS Racing	LMP2	Oreca 07	Gibson GK428 4.2 L V8	11	(United States) Steven Thomas (Denmark) Mikkel Jensen 6 (New Zealand) Hunter McElrea 5 (France) Charles Milesi 1 (United States) Scott Huffaker 1	DAY; 13	SEB; 2	WGI; 9	MOS; 3	ELK; 12	IMS; 1	ATL; 1	4th	2104	49
2025	(France) TDS Racing	LMP2	Oreca 07	Gibson GK428 4.2 L V8	11	(United States) Steven Thomas (New Zealand) Hunter McElrea 6 (Denmark) Mikkel Jensen 5 (France) Charles Milesi 1	DAY; 8	SEB; 3	WGI; 11	MOS; 8	ELK; 3	IMS; 1	ATL; 1	2nd	2154	46
2026*	(France) TDS Racing	LMP2	Oreca 07	Gibson GK428 4.2 L V8	11	(Switzerland) Mathias Beche (Denmark) David Heinemeier Hansson (Canada) Tobias Lütke (France) Charles Milesi	DAY; 12	SEB	WGI	MOS	ELK	IMS	ATL	12th*	216*	8*

* Season still in progress
