= G-Drive Racing =

Russian racing team

(Russia) G-Drive Racing
- Founded: 2012
- Base: Moscow, Russia
- Team principal(s): Alexander Krylov
- Current series: Russian Circuit Racing Series; SMP F4 Championship
- Former series: FIA World Endurance Championship; European Le Mans Series; Asian Le Mans Series; IMSA SportsCar Championship; Blancpain GT Series
- Current drivers: Russian Circuit Racing Series (Russia) Alexander Smolyar (Russia) Vladimir Atoev (Russia) Denis Remenyako (Russia) Irina Sidorkova; SMP F4 Championship (Russia) Egor Stepanov-Kim (Russia) Egor Nosov
- Noted drivers: (United Kingdom) Sam Bird (Argentina) Franco Colapinto (United Kingdom) Mike Conway (Brazil) Pipo Derani (Netherlands) Giedo van der Garde (Japan) Ryo Hirakawa (Denmark) Mikkel Jensen (United Kingdom) Alex Lynn (France) Olivier Pla (Germany) René Rast (Russia) Roman Rusinov (United Kingdom) Will Stevens (France) Jean-Éric Vergne (Netherlands) Nyck de Vries
- Website: https://www.gdriveracing.com/

G-Drive Racing is a Russian sports car racing team. It is named after the commercial fuel distributed by Gazprom Neft, a subsidiary of oil giant Gazprom. They made their debut in the LMP2 class of the 2012 FIA World Endurance Championship in a partnership with Signatech, before quickly rising to prominence, winning three titles in the European Le Mans Series, taking the 2015 WEC title, as well as winning the Asian Le Mans Series twice. Over the years, G-Drive ran in conjunction with multiple race teams, including Jota Sport, TDS Racing, Graff Racing, and Algarve Pro Racing.

As a result of regulations imposed by the FIA on Russian competitors in the aftermath of the 2022 Russian invasion of Ukraine, G-Drive withdrew from international competition. They currently organise multiple sporting events in Russia. The team opened a rally raid division in 2023 for Roman Rusinov and Anastasiya Nifontova, and the former won the Silk Way Rally in the T3 category the following year.

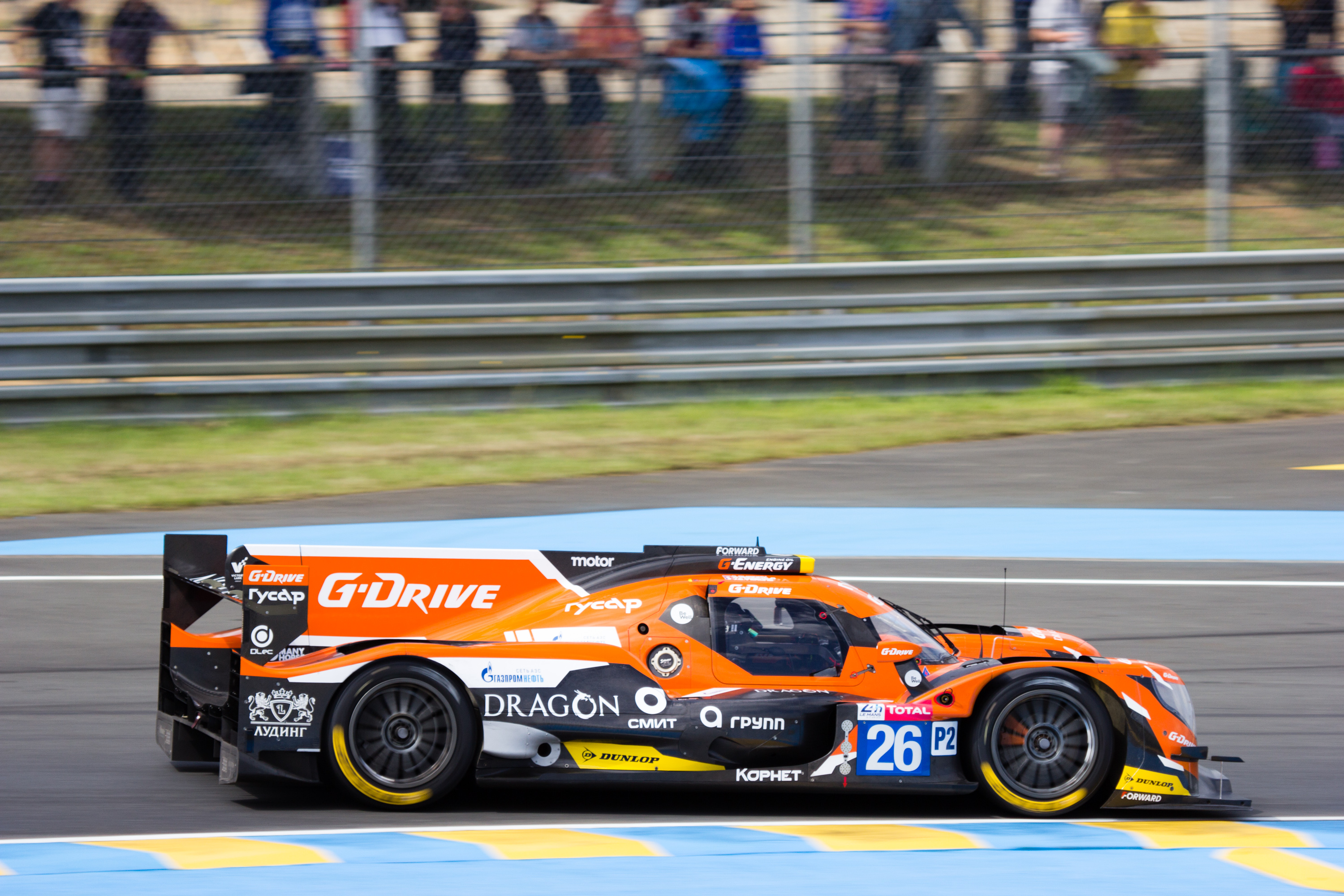
G-Drive Racing at the 2018 24 Hours of Le Mans.

== Racing record ==
=== 24 Hours of Le Mans results ===
| Year | Entrant | Team | No. | Car | Drivers | Class | Laps | Pos. | Class Pos. |
|---|---|---|---|---|---|---|---|---|---|
| 2012 | (France) Signatech-Nissan | Signatech | 26 | Oreca 03-Nissan | (France) Nelson Panciatici (France) Pierre Ragues (Russia) Roman Rusinov | LMP2 | 351 | 10th | 4th |
| 2013 | (United Kingdom) Delta-ADR | Delta-ADR | 25 | Oreca 03-Nissan | (Thailand) Tor Graves (United Kingdom) Archie Hamilton (Japan) Shinji Nakano | LMP2 | 101 | DNF | DNF |
| 2013 | (Russia) G-Drive Racing | Delta-ADR | 26 | Oreca 03-Nissan | (United Kingdom) Mike Conway (Australia) John Martin (Russia) Roman Rusinov | LMP2 | 327 | DSQ | DSQ |
| 2014 | (Russia) G-Drive Racing | OAK Racing | 26 | Morgan LMP2-Nissan | (France) Julien Canal (France) Olivier Pla (Russia) Roman Rusinov | LMP2 | 120 | DNF | DNF |
| 2014 | (France) OAK Racing | OAK Racing | 35 | Ligier JS P2-Nissan | (United Kingdom) Alex Brundle (United Kingdom) Jann Mardenborough (Russia) Mark Shulzhitskiy | LMP2 | 354 | 9th | 5th |
| 2015 | (Russia) G-Drive Racing | OAK Racing | 26 | Ligier JS P2-Nissan | (United Kingdom) Sam Bird (France) Julien Canal (Russia) Roman Rusinov | LMP2 | 358 | 11th | 3rd |
| 2015 | (Russia) G-Drive Racing | OAK Racing | 28 | Ligier JS P2-Nissan | (Brazil) Pipo Derani (Mexico) Ricardo González (Colombia) Gustavo Yacamán | LMP2 | 354 | 12th | 4th |
| 2016 | (Russia) G-Drive Racing | Jota Sport | 26 | Oreca 05-Nissan | (Germany) René Rast (Russia) Roman Rusinov (United Kingdom) Will Stevens | LMP2 | 357 | 6th | 2nd |
| 2016 | (Russia) G-Drive Racing | Jota Sport | 38 | Gibson 015S-Nissan | (United Kingdom) Jake Dennis (United Kingdom) Simon Dolan (Netherlands) Giedo van der Garde | LMP2 | 222 | DNF | DNF |
| 2017 | (Russia) G-Drive Racing | DragonSpeed | 22 | Oreca 07-Gibson | (Mexico) José Gutiérrez (Japan) Ryō Hirakawa (Mexico) Memo Rojas | LMP2 | 327 | 39th | 17th |
| 2017 | (Russia) G-Drive Racing | TDS Racing | 26 | Oreca 07-Gibson | (United Kingdom) Alex Lynn (Russia) Roman Rusinov (France) Pierre Thiriet | LMP2 | 20 | DNF | DNF |
| 2018 | (Russia) G-Drive Racing | TDS Racing | 26 | Oreca 07-Gibson | (France) Andrea Pizzitola (Russia) Roman Rusinov (France) Jean-Éric Vergne | LMP2 | 369 | DSQ | DSQ |
| 2018 | (Russia) G-Drive Racing | Graff Racing | 40 | Oreca 07-Gibson | (Australia) James Allen (France) Enzo Guibbert (Mexico) José Gutierrez | LMP2 | 197 | DNF | DNF |
| 2019 | (Russia) G-Drive Racing | TDS Racing | 26 | Aurus 01-Gibson | (Russia) Roman Rusinov (Netherlands) Job van Uitert (France) Jean-Éric Vergne | LMP2 | 364 | 11th | 6th |
| 2020 | (Russia) G-Drive Racing by Algarve | Algarve Pro Racing | 16 | Aurus 01-Gibson | (Republic of Ireland) Ryan Cullen (United Kingdom) Oliver Jarvis (United Kingdom) Nick Tandy | LMP2 | 105 | DNF | DNF |
| 2020 | (Russia) G-Drive Racing | TDS Racing | 26 | Aurus 01-Gibson | (Denmark) Mikkel Jensen (Russia) Roman Rusinov (France) Jean-Éric Vergne | LMP2 | 367 | 9th | 5th |
| 2021 | G-Drive Racing (Note: G-Drive Racing and Roman Rusinov are Russian, but both competed as neutral competitors using the designation RAF (Russian Automobile Federation), as the Court of Arbitration for Sport upheld a ban on Russia competing at World Championships. The ban was implemented by the World Anti-Doping Agency in response to state-sponsored doping program of Russian athletes.) | Algarve Pro Racing | 25 | Aurus 01-Gibson | (Portugal) Rui Andrade (United States) John Falb (Spain) Roberto Merhi | LMP2 (Pro-Am) | 108 | DNF | DNF |
| 2021 | G-Drive Racing | Algarve Pro Racing | 26 | Aurus 01-Gibson | (Argentina) Franco Colapinto; Roman Rusinov (Netherlands) Nyck de Vries | LMP2 | 358 | 12th | 7th |

=== FIA World Endurance Championship ===
| Year | Entrant | Team | Class | No. | Chassis | Engine | Drivers | 1 | 2 | 3 | 4 | 5 | 6 | 7 | 8 | 9 | Pos. | Pts |
|---|---|---|---|---|---|---|---|---|---|---|---|---|---|---|---|---|---|---|
| 2013 | (Russia) G-Drive Racing | Delta-ADR | LMP2 | 26 | Oreca 03 | Nissan VK45DE 4.5 L V8 | (United Kingdom) Mike Conway (Australia) John Martin (Russia) Roman Rusinov | SIL; 6 | SPA; 4 | LMS; EX | SÃO; 1 | COA; 1 | FUJ; 2 | SHA; 1 | BHR; 1 | | 3rd | 132 |
| 2014 | (Russia) G-Drive Racing | OAK Racing | LMP2 | 26 | Morgan LMP2; Ligier JS P2 | Nissan VK45DE 4.5 L V8 | (France) Julien Canal (France) Olivier Pla (Russia) Roman Rusinov | SIL; 1 | SPA; 1 | LMS; Ret | COA; 3 | FUJ; 1 | SHA; 1 | BHR; 3 | SÃO; Ret | | 2nd | 137 |
| 2015 | (Russia) G-Drive Racing | OAK Racing | LMP2 | 26 | Ligier JS P2 | Nissan VK45DE 4.5 L V8 | (United Kingdom) Sam Bird (France) Julien Canal (Russia) Roman Rusinov | SIL; 1 | SPA; 9 | LMS; 2 | NÜR; 2 | COA; 1 | FUJ; 1 | SHA; 2 | BHR; 1 | | 1st | 178 |
| 2015 | (Russia) G-Drive Racing | OAK Racing | LMP2 | 28 | Ligier JS P2 | Nissan VK45DE 4.5 L V8 | (Brazil) Pipo Derani (Mexico) Ricardo González (Colombia) Gustavo Yacamán | SIL; 2 | SPA; 1 | LMS; 3 | NÜR; 3 | COA; 3 | FUJ; 3 | SHA; Ret | BHR; 3 | | 3rd | 134 |
| 2016 | (Russia) G-Drive Racing | Jota Sport | LMP2 | 26 | Oreca 05 | Nissan VK45DE 4.5 L V8 | (Russia) Roman Rusinov (Germany) René Rast (rounds 1–6, 9) (France) Nathanaël Berthon (rounds 1–2) (United Kingdom) Will Stevens (rounds 3, 7–8) (United Kingdom) Alex Brundle (rounds 4–9) | SIL; 3 | SPA; 4 | LMS; 2 | NÜR; Ret | MEX; 7 | COA; 3 | FUJ; 1 | SHA; 1 | BHR; 1 | 3rd | 164 |
| 2016 | (Russia) G-Drive Racing | Jota Sport | LMP2 | 38 | Gibson 015S | Nissan VK45DE 4.5 L V8 | (United Kingdom) Jake Dennis (United Kingdom) Simon Dolan (Netherlands) Giedo van der Garde | SIL | SPA; 6 | LMS; Ret | NÜR | MEX | COA | FUJ | SHA | BHR | — | — |
| 2017 | (Russia) G-Drive Racing | DragonSpeed | LMP2 | 22 | Oreca 07 | Gibson GK428 4.2 L V8 | (Mexico) José Gutiérrez (Japan) Ryō Hirakawa (Mexico) Memo Rojas | SIL | SPA | LMS; 17 | NÜR | MEX | COA | FUJ | SHA | BHR | — | — |
| 2017 | (Russia) G-Drive Racing | TDS Racing | LMP2 | 26 | Oreca 07 | Gibson GK428 4.2 L V8 | (Russia) Roman Rusinov (France) Pierre Thiriet (rounds 1–7) (United Kingdom) Alex Lynn (rounds 1–3, 5–6) (United Kingdom) Ben Hanley (round 4) (United Kingdom) James Rossiter (round 7) (France) Léo Roussel (rounds 8–9) (Switzerland) Nico Müller (round 8) (France) Loïc Duval (round 9) | SIL; 5 | SPA; 1 | LMS; Ret | NÜR; 6 | MEX; 4 | COA; 8 | FUJ; 6 | SHA; 7 | BHR; 7 | 6th | 82 |

=== European Le Mans Series ===
| Year | Entrant | Team | Class | No. | Chassis | Engine | Drivers | 1 | 2 | 3 | 4 | 5 | 6 | Pos. | Pts |
|---|---|---|---|---|---|---|---|---|---|---|---|---|---|---|---|
| 2016 | (Russia) G-Drive Racing | Jota Sport | LMP2 | 38 | Gibson 015S | Nissan VK45DE 4.5 L V8 | (United Kingdom) Simon Dolan (Netherlands) Giedo van der Garde (United Kingdom) Harry Tincknell | SIL; 1 | IMO; 2 | RBR; 3 | LEC; 5 | SPA; 5 | EST; 1 | 1st | 103 |
| 2017 | (Russia) G-Drive Racing | DragonSpeed | LMP2 | 22 | Oreca 07 | Gibson GK428 4.2L V8 | (Mexico) Memo Rojas (France) Léo Roussel (Japan) Ryō Hirakawa (rounds 1–2, 5–6) (France) Nicolas Minassian (rounds 3–4) | SIL; 2 | MNZ; 1 | RBR; 2 | LEC; 2 | SPA; 2 | ALG; 4 | 1st | 110 |
| 2018 | (Russia) G-Drive Racing | TDS Racing | LMP2 | 26 | Oreca 07 | Gibson GK428 4.2L V8 | (France) Andrea Pizzitola (Russia) Roman Rusinov (Switzerland) Alexandre Imperatori (round 1) (France) Jean-Éric Vergne (rounds 2–6) | LEC; 4 | MNZ; 1 | RBR; 1 | SIL; 1 | SPA; 12‡ | ALG; 4 | 1st | 100.25 |
| 2018 | (Russia) G-Drive Racing | Graff | LMP2 | 40 | Oreca 07 | Gibson GK428 4.2L V8 | (Australia) James Allen (Mexico) José Gutiérrez (rounds 1–4) (France) Enzo Guibbert (rounds 1–2) (United Kingdom) Garry Findlay (round 4) (Sweden) Henning Enqvist (rounds 5–6) (France) Julien Falchero (rounds 5–6) | LEC; 6 | MNZ; Ret | RBR; 13 | SIL; 12 | SPA; 11‡ | ALG; 7 | 12th | 15.25 |
| 2019 | (Russia) G-Drive Racing | TDS Racing | LMP2 | 26 | Aurus 01 | Gibson GK428 4.2L V8 | (Russia) Roman Rusinov (Netherlands) Job van Uitert (France) Norman Nato (round 1–2) (France) Jean-Éric Vergne (rounds 3–6) | LEC; 4 | MNZ; 1 | CAT; 1 | SIL; 2 | SPA; 4 | ALG; 6 | 2nd | 101 |
| 2020 | (Russia) G-Drive Racing | TDS Racing | LMP2 | 26 | Aurus 01 | Gibson GK428 4.2L V8 | (Denmark) Mikkel Jensen (Russia) Roman Rusinov (Netherlands) Nyck de Vries (rounds 1, 4–5) (France) Jean-Éric Vergne (round 3) | LEC; 2 | SPA; Ret | LEC; 2 | MNZ; Ret | ALG; 1 | | 3rd | 61 |
| 2021 | (Russia) G-Drive Racing | Algarve Pro Racing | LMP2 | 25 | Aurus 01 | Gibson GK428 4.2L V8 | (Portugal) Rui Andrade (United States) John Falb (Brazil) Pietro Fittipaldi (round 1) (Spain) Roberto Merhi (rounds 2–4) (United States) Gustavo Menezes (rounds 5–6) | CAT; 7 | RBR; 3 | LEC; 10 | MNZ; 6 | SPA; 7 | ALG; 8 | 6th | 42 |
| 2021 | (Russia) G-Drive Racing | Algarve Pro Racing | LMP2 | 26 | Aurus 01 | Gibson GK428 4.2L V8 | (Argentina) Franco Colapinto (Russia) Roman Rusinov (Netherlands) Nyck de Vries (rounds 1–3, 5–6) (Denmark) Mikkel Jensen (round 4) | CAT; 4 | RBR; 2 | LEC; 1 | MNZ; 8 | SPA; NC | ALG; 5 | 4th | 74 |
