= Andrea Pizzitola =

French racing driver

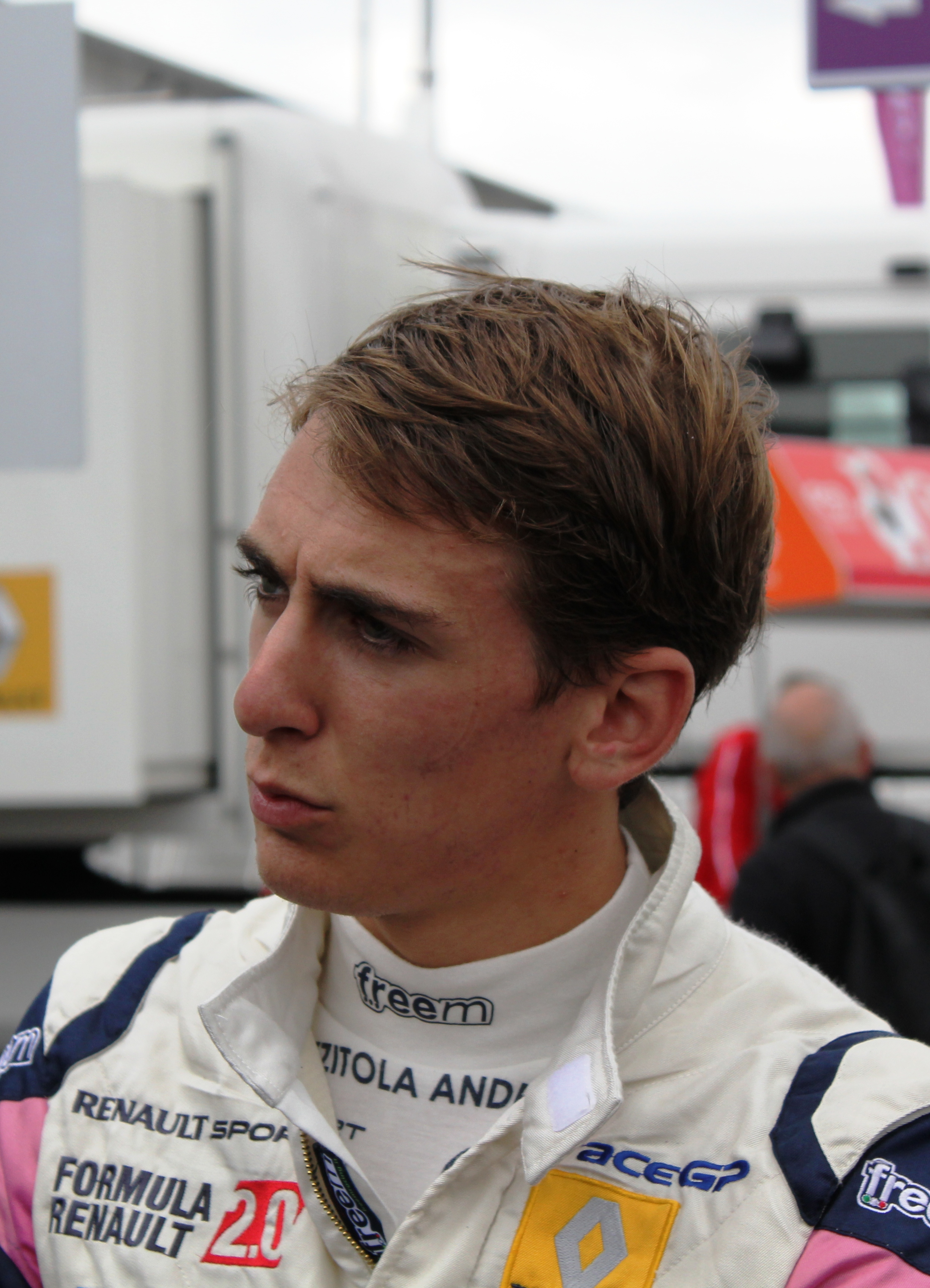
- Pizzitola in 2012
- Nationality: French
- Born: Andrea Luigi René Pizzitola; 19 June 1992 (age 34) Montpellier, France

European Le Mans Series career
- Debut season: 2016
- Current team: G-Drive Racing
- Categorisation: FIA Silver (until 2018); FIA Gold (2019–)
- Car number: 10
- Former teams: Algarve Pro Racing
- Starts: 21
- Wins: 3
- Poles: 1
- Fastest laps: 3
- Best finish: 1st in 2018

Previous series
- 2015 2012-14 2012–14 2011: Renault Sport Trophy; Eurocup Formula Renault 2.0; Formula Renault 2.0 NEC; French F4 Championship

Championship titles
- 2016 2015: European Le Mans Series; Renault Sport Trophy Elite Class

Andrea Luigi René Pizzitola (born 19 June 1992) is a French former professional racing driver. He is best known for winning the 2018 European Le Mans Series with G-Drive Racing.

== Career ==
=== Karting ===
Born in Montpellier, Pizzitola entered karting in 2008, racing in local championships. His best achievement was eighth place in the French KF2 Championship in 2011.

=== Formula Renault ===
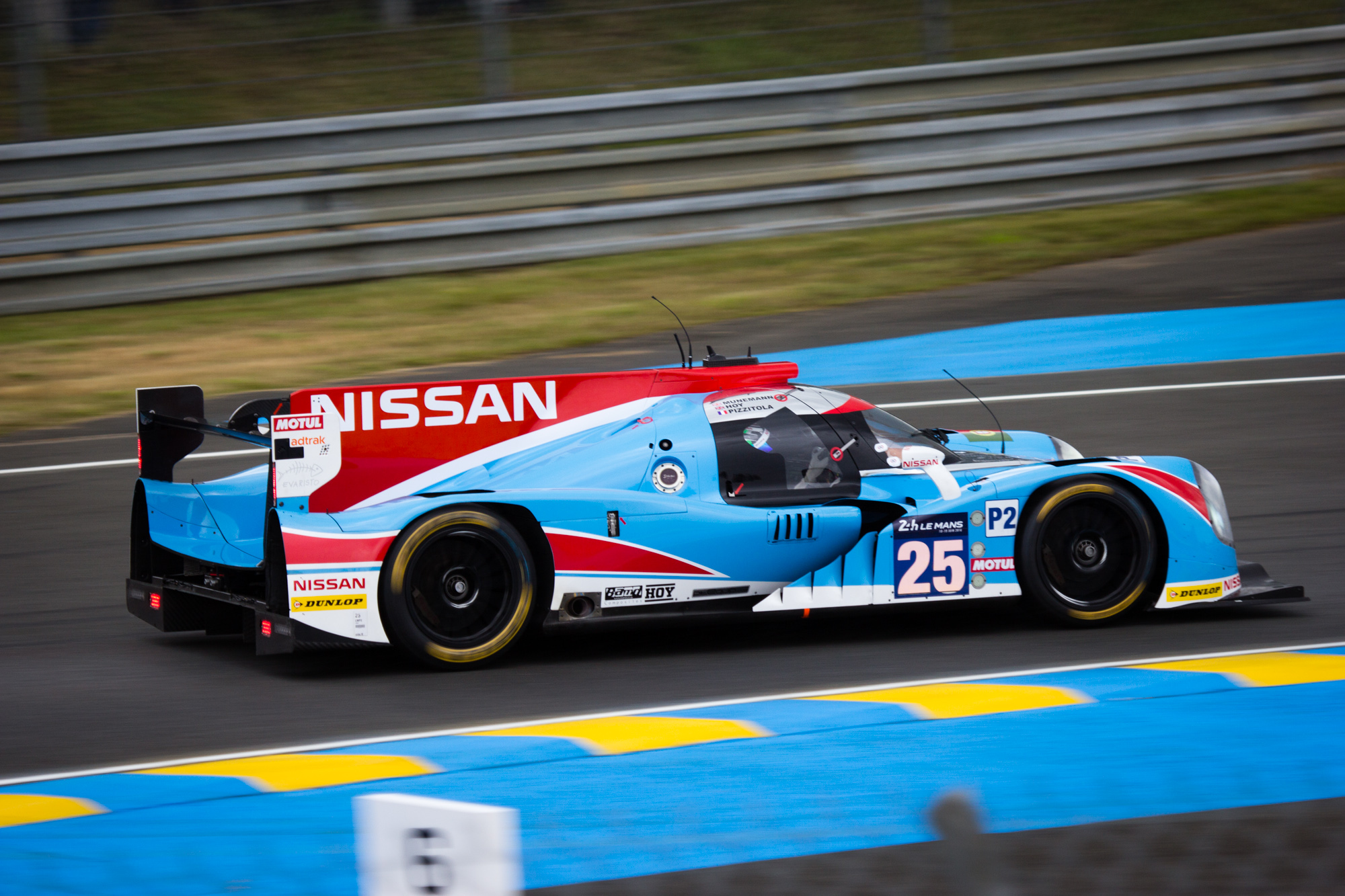
Pizzitola made his LMP2 debut in 2016 for Algarve Pro Racing.

In 2011, Pizzitola made his début in single-seaters, taking part in the French F4 Championship 1.6-litre category. He finished as runner-up to his future Eurocup rival Matthieu Vaxivière with seven podiums, including wins at Lédenon, Val de Vienne and Albi.

Pizzitola moved to the 2-litre Formula Renault machinery in 2012, joining R-Ace GP in the Formula Renault Eurocup. He finished 21st with two-point-scoring finishes. He also had eleven starts in the Formula Renault 2.0 Northern European Cup with the same team, collecting podiums at Hockenheim, the Nürburgring and Assen.

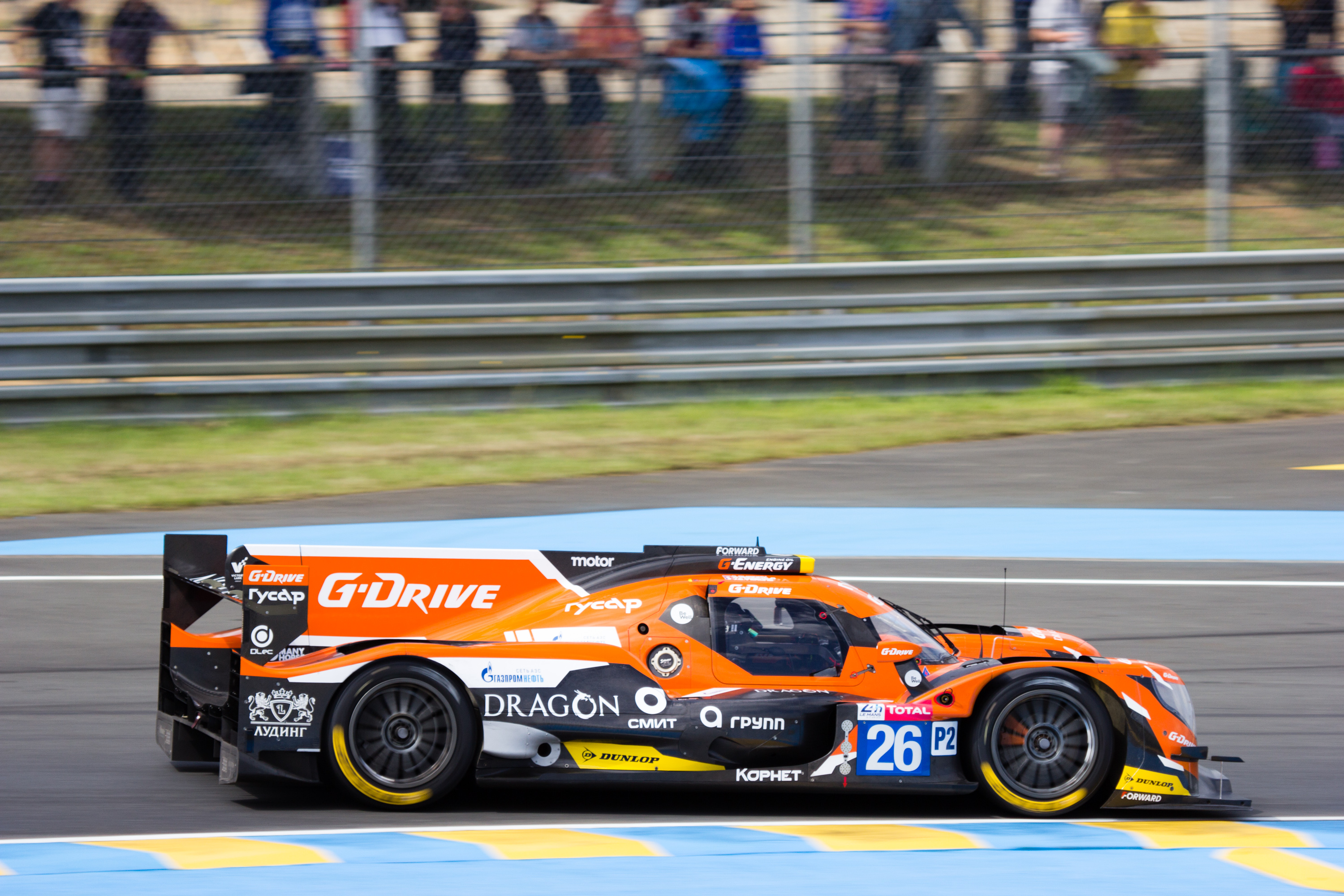
Pizzitola was ELMS champion in 2018 with G-Drive Racing, here pictured at Le Mans.

Pizzitola stayed with R-Ace GP — rebranded as the ART Junior Team for 2013. He took his first Eurocup podium in the series finale at Barcelona, as well as another four-point-scoring positions. He also continued competing in Formula Renault 2.0 NEC, winning his first Formula Renault race at Hockenheim, improving to sixth in the standings.

For the 2014 season, Pizzitola switched to Manor MP Motorsport. It helped him to secure his first Eurocup win at Alcañiz. He had another win at the Hungaroring, finally finishing the season in fourth place in the championship. As in previous years, he combined his Eurocup participations with the NEC series, winning a race at the Nürburgring.

== Racing record ==
=== Career summary ===
Season	Series	Team	Races	Wins	Poles	FLaps	Podiums	Points	Position
2010	French Renault Clio Cup	Speed Car	14	0	0	0	0	102	16th
2011	French F4 Championship	Auto Sport Academy	14	3	0	2	7	120	**2nd**
2012	Eurocup Formula Renault 2.0	R-ace GP	14	0	1	0	0	12	21st
2012	Formula Renault 2.0 NEC	R-ace GP	11	0	0	1	4	141	13th
2013	Eurocup Formula Renault 2.0	ART Junior Team	14	0	0	0	1	39	13th
2013	Formula Renault 2.0 NEC	ART Junior Team	14	1	2	1	3	190	6th
2013	Blancpain Endurance Series	Speed Car	1	0	0	0	0	N/A	NC
2014	Eurocup Formula Renault 2.0	Manor MP Motorsport	14	2	2	0	1	108	4th
2014	Formula Renault 2.0 NEC	Manor MP Motorsport	6	1	2	1	3	114	14th
2015	Renault Sport Trophy - Elite Class	ART Junior Team	9	2	0	1	6	140	**1st**
2015	Renault Sport Endurance Trophy	ART Junior Team	6	2	2	1	5	95	**2nd**
2016	European Le Mans Series	Algarve Pro Racing	3	0	0	0	0	18	20th
2016	24 Hours of Le Mans - LMP2	Algarve Pro Racing	1	0	0	0	0	N/A	12th
2017	European Le Mans Series	Algarve Pro Racing	6	0	0	0	0	4.5	20th
2018	European Le Mans Series	G-Drive Racing	6	3	1	0	3	100.25	**1st**
2018	24 Hours of Le Mans – LMP2	G-Drive Racing	1	0	0	0	0	N/A	DSQ
2018–19	Asian Le Mans Series	Algarve Pro Racing	4	2	1	1	3	69	**2nd**
2019	European Le Mans Series	Algarve Pro Racing	6	0	0	0	0	28	14th
2019	24 Hours of Le Mans – LMP2	Algarve Pro Racing	1	0	0	0	0	N/A	10th

=== Complete Eurocup Formula Renault 2.0 results ===
(key) (Races in bold indicate pole position; races in italics indicate fastest lap)

Year	Entrant	1	2	3	4	5	6	7	8	9	10	11	12	13	14	DC	Points
2012	R-ace GP	ALC; 1; 12	ALC; 2; 12	SPA; 1; 32	**SPA**; **2**; 13	NÜR; 1; 13	NÜR; 2; 9	MSC; 1; 19	MSC; 2; 12	HUN; 1 Ret	HUN; 2; 16	LEC; 1; 5	LEC; 2; 16	CAT; 1 Ret	CAT; 2; 18	21st	12
2013	ART Junior Team	ALC; 1; 15	ALC; 2; 15	SPA; 1; 4	SPA; 2; 28	MSC; 1; 13	MSC; 2; 15	RBR; 1; 20	RBR; 2; 17	HUN; 1; 10	HUN; 2; 10	LEC; 1; 19	LEC; 2 Ret	CAT; 1; 5	CAT; 2; 3	13th	39
2014	Manor MP Motorsport	ALC; 1 Ret	**ALC**; **2**; 1	SPA; 1; 15	SPA; 2; 10	MSC; 1; 2	MSC; 2; 6	NÜR; 1; 7	NÜR; 2; 10	**HUN**; **1**; 1	HUN; 2; 9	LEC; 1; 5	LEC; 2; 8	JER; 1; 13	JER; 2; 22	4th	108

=== Complete Formula Renault 2.0 NEC results ===
(key) (Races in bold indicate pole position) (Races in italics indicate fastest lap)

Year	Entrant	1	2	3	4	5	6	7	8	9	10	11	12	13	14	15	16	17	18	19	20	DC	Points
2012	R-ace GP	HOC; 1; 4	HOC; 2; 2	HOC; 3; 3	NÜR; 1; 9	NÜR; 2; 3	OSC; 1	OSC; 2	OSC; 3	ASS; 1; 3	ASS; 2 Ret	RBR; 1; 8	RBR; 2 Ret	MST; 1	MST; 2	MST; 3	ZAN; 1	ZAN; 2	ZAN; 3	SPA; 1; 10	SPA; 2; 17	13th	141
2013	ART Junior Team	HOC; 1; 6	HOC; 2; 11	**HOC**; **3**; 1	NÜR; 1 Ret	NÜR; 2; 4	SIL; 1	SIL; 2	SPA; 1; 23	SPA; 2; 2	ASS; 1; 6	ASS; 2; 6	MST; 1; 6	MST; 2; 8	**MST**; **3**; 5	ZAN; 1; 3	ZAN; 2 Ret	ZAN; 3 C				6th	190
2014	Manor MP Motorsport	MNZ; 1; 3	MNZ; 2; 5	SIL; 1 WD	SIL; 2 WD	HOC; 1	HOC; 2	HOC; 3	SPA; 1	SPA; 2	ASS; 1	ASS; 2	MST; 1; 6	MST; 2; 8	MST; 3 C	**NÜR**; **1**; 1	NÜR; 2; 3	**NÜR**; **3** C				14th	114

=== Complete European Le Mans Series results ===
Year	Entrant	Class	Chassis	Engine	1	2	3	4	5	6	Rank	Points
2016	Algarve Pro Racing	LMP2	Ligier JS P2	Nissan VK45DE 4.5 L V8	SIL	IMO	RBR; 5	LEC; 7	SPA; 9	EST	20th	18
2017	Algarve Pro Racing	LMP2	Ligier JS P217	Gibson GK428 4.2 L V8	SIL; Ret	MNZ; Ret	RBR; Ret	LEC; 8	SPA; Ret	ALG; 11	20th	4.5
2018	G-Drive Racing	LMP2	Oreca 07	Gibson GK428 4.2 L V8	LEC; 4	MNZ; 1	RBR; 1	SIL; 1	**SPA**; 12‡	ALG; 4	1st	100.25
2019	Algarve Pro Racing	LMP2	Oreca 07	Gibson GK428 4.2 L V8	LEC; 14	MNZ; 12	CAT; 6	SIL; 6	SPA; 10	ALG; 5	14th	28

^{‡} Half points awarded as less than 75% of race distance was completed.

=== 24 Hours of Le Mans results ===
Year	Team	Co-Drivers	Car	Class	Laps	Pos.	Class Pos.
2016	(Portugal) Algarve Pro Racing	(United Kingdom) Chris Hoy (United Kingdom) Michael Munemann	Ligier JS P2-Nissan	LMP2	341	17th	12th
2018	(Russia) G-Drive Racing	(Russia) Roman Rusinov (France) Jean-Éric Vergne	Oreca 07-Gibson	LMP2	369	DSQ	DSQ
2019	(Portugal) Algarve Pro Racing	(United States) John Falb (France) David Zollinger	Oreca 07-Gibson	LMP2	357	15th	10th

Sporting positions
Preceded by Inaugural	Renault Sport Trophy Elite Class; Champion; 2015	Succeeded by Pieter Schothorst
Preceded by Memo Rojas; Léo Roussel	European Le Mans Series; LMP2 Champion; 2018; With: Roman Rusinov	Succeeded by Memo Rojas; Paul-Loup Chatin; Paul Lafargue
