= Roman Rusinov =

Russian racing driver (born 1981)

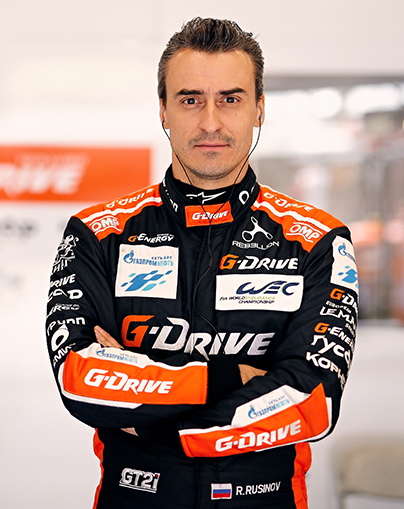
- Nationality: (Russia) Russian
- Born: Roman Aleksandrovich Rusinov; 21 October 1981 (age 45) Moscow, Russian SFSR, Soviet Union
- Categorisation: FIA Silver (until 2013, 2016); FIA Gold (2014–2015, 2017–)

24 Hours of Le Mans career
- Years: 2008 – 2009, 2012 – 2021
- Teams: IPB Spartak Racing, Team Modena, Signatech-Nissan, G-Drive Racing
- Best finish: 2nd (2016)

Roman Aleksandrovich Rusinov (Russian: Рома́н Алекса́ндрович Ру́синов, IPA: [rɐˈman ɐlʲɪˈksandrəvʲɪtɕ ˈrusʲɪnəv], born 21 October 1981 in Moscow) is a Russian auto racing driver who competed in the FIA World Endurance Championship with G-Drive Racing from the Championship's first season in 2012 until 2021 and the European Le Mans Series from 2018 until 2021. He has four titles in international endurance championships.

Rusinov is the first Russian driver to win an international race in Europe.

== Racing record ==
In 2000, Rusinov won the International Renault Finals in French Formula Renault, becoming the first Russian driver to win an international race in Europe. In 2002 he led the Formula Palmer Audi championship till the last event, but collided with his main rival and finished third overall. In 2003 he competed in Euro Formula 3000, taking a pole position at the Nürburgring.

The same year, Rusinov won the LMP675 class at the first race of the Le Mans Series, the 1000 km of Le Mans. In 2004, Rusinov raced with Ferrari Modena and became the Le Mans Series Champion in the GT2 class. In 2005, he competed in a Maserati MC12 in the FIA GT Championship and was appointed one of Russia's A1GP drivers. The A1GP team lasted only three events before running out of funding.

In 2006, Rusinov was one of four test drivers signed to Formula One team MF1 Racing. The team's owner, Russian-born Canadian businessman Alex Shnaider, had announced an ambition to get a Russian driver into F1. Rusinov participated in the first MF1 tests at Jerez, but was the only test driver not to participate in at least one Friday practice session, due to the absence of Russian sponsors on the MF1 Racing car and the difficult financial situation of the team.

In 2008, Rusinov switched to endurance racing, driving a Reiter Engineering-prepared Lamborghini Murcielago racing under the IPB SPARTAK RACING name in the FIA GT Championship and the Le Mans Series, and a Lamborghini Gallardo in the ADAC GT Masters series. In the latter series, he won two of the three races, with his driving partner Peter Kox.

In 2012, Rusinov entered the inaugural running of the FIA World Endurance Championship, joining the reigning Intercontinental Le Mans Cup champions Signatech-Nissan from round two onwards.

In 2013, Rusinov's association with G-Drive Racing began, with the Gazprom brand sponsoring the No. 26 car in the LMP2 category. In subsequent years until 2021, the brand and Rusinov moved through several partnerships as they expanded across WEC and in the European Le Mans Series.

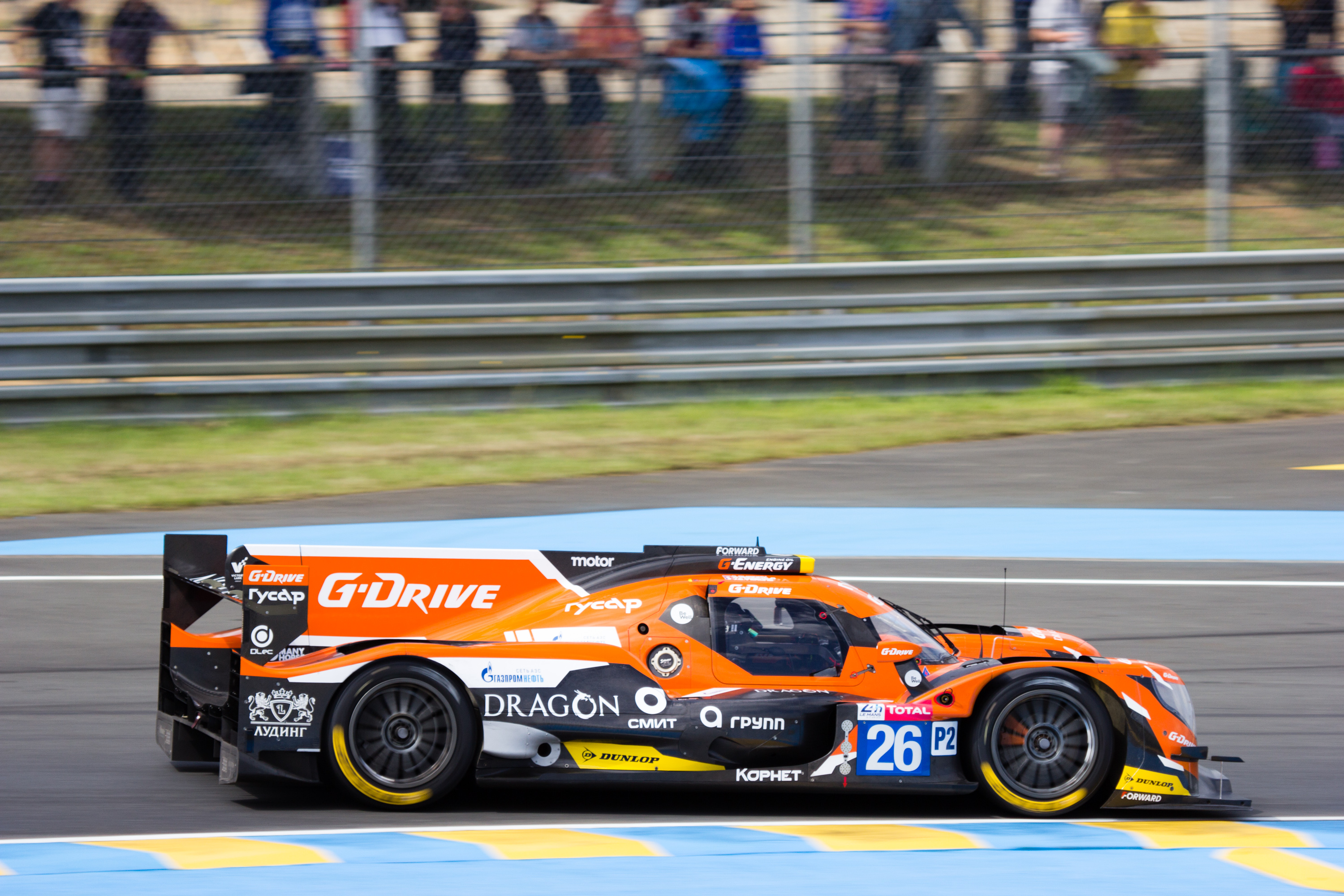
Rusinov at the 2018 Le Mans 24

At the 2018 24 Hours of Le Mans, Rusinov's G-Drive LMP2 crossed the finish line first, but was disqualified during post-race scrutineering for a modified refuelling rig in their fuel system assemblies.

In 2022, the team formally entered the No. 53 car to ELMS under G-Drive Racing. However, on 6 March 2022, Rusinov announced via an Instagram post that the team would not be competing, citing that he was not willing to sign off the conditions of competition for Russian athletes introduced by the FIA in response to the 2022 Russian invasion of Ukraine.

Rusinov began to compete in rally raids in 2023, driving a Can-Am Maverick in the T3 category for G-Drive Racing. He finished eighth in class in his debut at the Russian Rally-Raid Championship's Gold of Kagan Baja, then runner-up at the Silk Way Rally. The following year, Rusinov won the Silk Way in T3.

Rusinov returned to endurance racing in early 2025, driving a Graff Racing-run Rossa LM GT at the Dubai 24 Hour alongside former teammate Harrison Newey.

== Career results ==
=== Career summary ===
Season	Series	Team	Races	Wins	Poles	F/Laps	Podiums	Points	Position
2000	Championnat de France Formula Renault 2.0	Graff Racing	8	1	0	0	1	25	7th
2001	Championnat de France Formula Renault 2.0	Graff Racing	11	0	0	0	1	53	10th
2001	Formula Renault 2000 Eurocup	Graff Racing	4	0	0	0	0	0	42nd
2002	Formula Palmer Audi	N/A	12	1	1	5	7	198	3rd
2003	Euro Formula 3000	GP Racing	7	0	1	1	0	6	9th
2004	Le Mans Endurance Series - GT	JMB Racing	4	1	0	0	2	25	1st
2005	FIA GT Championship - GT1	JMB Racing	5	0	0	0	0	17	11th
2005	Formula One	Jordan Grand Prix	Test driver						
2005–06	A1 Grand Prix	A1 Team Russia	2	0	0	0	0	0‡	25th‡
2006	Formula One	Midland F1 Racing	Test driver						
2008	Le Mans Series - GT1	IPB Spartak Racing	5	0	1	0	3	27	3rd
2008	24 Hours of Le Mans - GT1	IPB Spartak Racing	1	0	0	0	0	N/A	NC
2008	FIA GT Championship - GT1	Reiter Engineering	4	0	0	0	0	9.5	17th
2008	ADAC GT Masters	Reiter Engineering	5	2	0	1	2	20	14th
2009	Le Mans Series - GT1	IPB Spartak Racing	1	1	0	0	1	10	8th
2009	24 Hours of Le Mans - GT2	Team Modena	1	0	0	0	0	N/A	7th
2012	FIA World Endurance Championship	Signatech-Nissan	7	0	0	0	0	11.5	25th
2012	24 Hours of Le Mans - LMP2	Signatech-Nissan	1	0	0	0	0	N/A	4th
2013	FIA World Endurance Championship - LMP2	G-Drive Racing	8	4	0	0	5	132	3rd
2013	24 Hours of Le Mans - LMP2	G-Drive Racing	1	0	0	0	0	N/A	DSQ
2013	24 Hours of Nürburgring - SP9	G-Drive Racing by Phoenix	1	0	0	0	0	N/A	8th
2014	FIA World Endurance Championship - LMP2	G-Drive Racing	8	4	6	0	6	137	2nd
2014	24 Hours of Le Mans - LMP2	G-Drive Racing	1	0	0	0	0	N/A	DNF
2014	United SportsCar Championship - Prototype	OAK Racing	1	0	0	0	0	26	45th
2014	Blancpain GT Sprint Series - Pro	G-Drive Racing (Note: At the first three rounds, G-Drive Racing ran as a support team for the W Racing Team. At the fifth round, G-Drive Racing formed part of the Reiter Engineering entry.)	8	0	0	0	0	16	16th
2014	24 Hours of Nürburgring - SP9	G-Drive Racing	1	0	0	0	0	N/A	DNF
2015	FIA World Endurance Championship - LMP2	G-Drive Racing	8	4	0	0	7	178	1st
2015	24 Hours of Le Mans - LMP2	G-Drive Racing	1	0	0	0	1	N/A	3rd
2016	FIA World Endurance Championship - LMP2	G-Drive Racing	9	3	3	0	6	162	3rd
2016	24 Hours of Le Mans - LMP2	G-Drive Racing	1	0	0	0	1	N/A	2nd
2016	European Le Mans Series - LMP3	Eurointernational	2	0	0	0	0	6	25th
2017	FIA World Endurance Championship - LMP2	G-Drive Racing	9	1	0	0	1	82	9th
2017	24 Hours of Le Mans - LMP2	G-Drive Racing	1	0	0	0	0	N/A	DNF
2018	European Le Mans Series - LMP2	G-Drive Racing	6	3	0	0	3	100.25	1st
2018	24 Hours of Le Mans - LMP2	G-Drive Racing	1	0	0	0	0	N/A	DSQ
2018	24H GT Series - 991	RScar Motorsport	1	0	0	0	0	0	NC
2019	European Le Mans Series - LMP2	G-Drive Racing	6	2	0	0	2	101	2nd
2019	24 Hours of Le Mans - LMP2	G-Drive Racing	1	0	0	0	0	N/A	6th
2019–20	Asian Le Mans Series - LMP2	G-Drive Racing with Algarve	4	2	0	0	4	83	1st
2020	European Le Mans Series - LMP2	G-Drive Racing	5	1	0	0	3	61	3rd
2020	24 Hours of Le Mans - LMP2	G-Drive Racing	1	0	0	0	0	N/A	5th
2021	European Le Mans Series - LMP2	G-Drive Racing	6	1	1	1	2	74	4th
2021	FIA World Endurance Championship - LMP2	G-Drive Racing	2	0	0	0	0	0	NC†
2021	24 Hours of Le Mans - LMP2	G-Drive Racing	1	0	0	0	0	N/A	7th
2025	Middle East Trophy - GTX	Graff Racing							
2025	Ultimate Cup European Series - GT Endurance Cup - UCS1	Graff Racing							
2025–26	24H Series Middle East - GTX	Rossa Racing							

† Guest driver ineligible to score points

‡ Teams' Standings

=== Complete 24 Hours of Le Mans results ===
Year	Team	Co-Drivers	Car	Class	Laps	Pos.	Class Pos.
2008	(Russia) IPB Spartak Racing (Germany) Reiter Engineering	(Netherlands) Peter Kox (Netherlands) Mike Hezemans	Lamborghini Murciélago R-GT	GT1	266	NC	NC
2009	(United Kingdom) Team Modena	(United Kingdom) Leo Mansell (Germany) Pierre Ehret	Ferrari F430 GT2	GT2	314	27th	7th
2012	(France) Signatech-Nissan	(France) Pierre Ragues (France) Nelson Panciatici	Oreca 03-Nissan	LMP2	351	10th	4th
2013	(Russia) G-Drive-Nissan	(Australia) John Martin (United Kingdom) Mike Conway	Oreca 03-Nissan	LMP2	327	EX	EX
2014	(Russia) G-Drive Racing	(France) Olivier Pla (France) Julien Canal	Morgan LMP2-Nissan	LMP2	120	DNF	DNF
2015	(Russia) G-Drive Racing	(United Kingdom) Sam Bird (France) Julien Canal	Ligier JS P2-Nissan	LMP2	358	11th	3rd
2016	(Russia) G-Drive Racing	(Germany) René Rast (United Kingdom) Will Stevens	Oreca 05-Nissan	LMP2	357	6th	2nd
2017	(Russia) G-Drive Racing	(France) Pierre Thiriet (United Kingdom) Alex Lynn	Oreca 07-Gibson	LMP2	20	DNF	DNF
2018	(Russia) G-Drive Racing	(France) Andrea Pizzitola (France) Jean-Éric Vergne	Oreca 07-Gibson	LMP2	369	DSQ	DSQ
2019	(Russia) G-Drive Racing	(Netherlands) Job van Uitert (France) Jean-Éric Vergne	Aurus 01-Gibson	LMP2	364	11th	6th
2020	(Russia) G-Drive Racing	(Denmark) Mikkel Jensen (France) Jean-Éric Vergne	Aurus 01-Gibson	LMP2	367	9th	5th
2021	G-Drive Racing	(Argentina) Franco Colapinto (Netherlands) Nyck de Vries	Aurus 01-Gibson	LMP2	358	12th	7th

=== Complete FIA World Endurance Championship results ===
Year	Entrant	Class	Car	Engine	1	2	3	4	5	6	7	8	9	Rank	Points
2012	Signatech-Nissan	LMP2	Oreca 03	Nissan VK45DE 4.5 L V8	SEB	SPA; 25	LMS; 8	SIL; 10	SÃO; 14	BHR; 10	FUJ; EX	SHA; 13		25th	11.5
2013	G-Drive Racing	LMP2	Oreca 03	Nissan VK45DE 4.5 L V8	SIL; 6	SPA; 4	LMS; EX	SÃO; 1	COA; 1	FUJ; 2	SHA; 1	BHR; 1		3rd	132
2014	G-Drive Racing	LMP2	Morgan LMP2	Nissan VK45DE 4.5 L V8	SIL; 1	SPA; 1	LMS; Ret							2nd	137
2014	G-Drive Racing	LMP2	Ligier JS P2	Nissan VK45DE 4.5 L V8				COA; 3	FUJ; 1	SHA; 1	BHR; 3	SÃO; Ret		2nd	137
2015	G-Drive Racing	LMP2	Ligier JS P2	Nissan VK45DE 4.5 L V8	SIL; 1	SPA; 9	LMS; 2	NÜR; 2	COA; 1	FUJ; 1	SHA; 2	BHR; 1		1st	178
2016	G-Drive Racing	LMP2	Oreca 05	Nissan VK45DE 4.5 L V8	SIL; 3	SPA; 5	LMS; 2	NÜR; Ret	MEX; 7	COA; 3	FUJ; 1	SHA; 1	BHR; 1	3rd	162
2017	G-Drive Racing	LMP2	Oreca 07	Gibson GK428 4.2 L V8	SIL; 5	SPA; 1	LMS; Ret	NÜR; 6	MEX; 4	COA; 8	FUJ; 6	SHA; 7	BHR; 7	9th	82

=== Complete European Le Mans Series results ===
Year	Entrant	Class	Chassis	Engine	1	2	3	4	5	6	Rank	Points
2016	Eurointernational	LMP3	Ligier JS P3	Nissan VK50VE 5.0 L V8	SIL	IMO; 8	RBR; 9	LEC	SPA	EST	25th	6
2018	G-Drive Racing	LMP2	Oreca 07	Gibson GK428 4.2 L V8	LEC; 4	MNZ; 1	RBR; 1	SIL; 1	SPA; 12‡	ALG; 4	1st	100.25
2019	G-Drive Racing	LMP2	Aurus 01	Gibson GK428 4.2 L V8	LEC; 4	MNZ; 1	CAT; 1	SIL; 2	SPA; 4	ALG; 6	2nd	101
2020	G-Drive Racing	LMP2	Aurus 01	Gibson GK428 4.2 L V8	LEC; 2	SPA; Ret	LEC; 2	MNZ; Ret	ALG; 1		3rd	61
2021	G-Drive Racing	LMP2	Aurus 01	Gibson GK428 4.2 L V8	CAT; 4	RBR; 2	LEC; 1	MNZ; 8	SPA; Ret	ALG; 5	4th	74

^{‡} Half points awarded as less than 75% of race distance was completed.

== Notes ==
Sporting positions
Preceded by Sergey Zlobin	FIA Endurance Trophy for LMP2 Drivers; 2015; With: Sam Bird & Julien Canal	Succeeded by Gustavo Menezes; Nicolas Lapierre; Stéphane Richelmi
Preceded by Memo Rojas; Léo Roussel	European Le Mans Series; LMP2 Champion; 2018; With: Andrea Pizzitola	Succeeded by Memo Rojas; Paul-Loup Chatin; Paul Lafargue
Preceded by Paul di Resta; Phil Hanson	Asian Le Mans Series; LMP2 Champion; 2019–20; With: James French & Leonard Hoogenboom	Succeeded by René Binder; Ferdinand von Habsburg; Yifei Ye
