= Perrodo =

Perrodo is a surname. Notable people with the surname include:

- Carrie Perrodo (born 1950/51), French billionaire heiress and businesswoman, wife of Hubert
- François Perrodo (born 1977), French businessman, son of Hubert
- Hubert Perrodo (1944-2006), French businessman, polo player and art collector
