= Teerlink =

Teerlink is a surname. Notable people with the surname include:

- Abraham Teerlink (1776–1857), Dutch painter
- Jan Bekker Teerlink (1759–1832), Dutch winemaker

== See also ==
- Teerlinc, surname
- Teerlinck, surname
