= Petroleum industry in the Republic of the Congo =

National occurrence of petroleum industry

Oil and Gas dominate the resource sector of the Republic of the Congo (French: République du Congo), also referred to as Congo-Brazzaville, with the petroleum industry accounting for 89% of the country's exports in 2010. As of June 22, 2018, it is a full member of the Organization of the Petroleum Exporting Countries (OPEC), and among African crude oil producers in 2022, the Congo ranked sixth. Nearly all of the country's hydrocarbons were produced off-shore.

According to the OPEC annual statistical bulletin of 2022, the Congo exported $5,785 billion worth of petroleum in 2021. This accounts for 79.3% of its net exports of $7,291 billion.

== Oil and gas ==
=== Oil ===
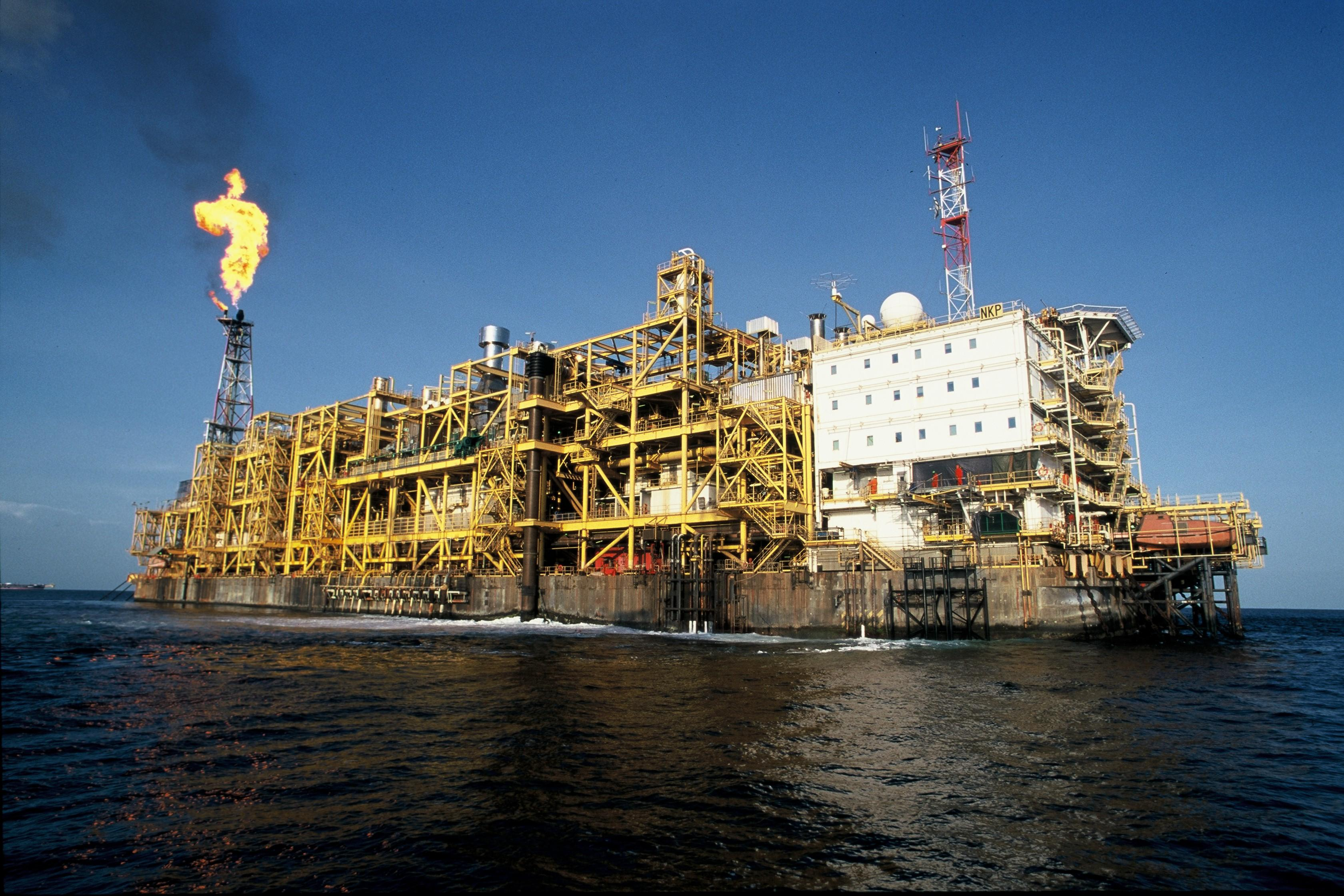
Oil platform of N'Kossa.

In the late 1970s, Congo emerged as a significant oil producer, with production expanding considerably during the 1990s. By the turn of the century, production began to decline as existing oil fields reached maturity. As of 2008, oil production has increased every year as a result of several new projects, mainly Congo's first deep-water field Moho-Bilondo. The Congo is the sixth largest oil producer in sub-Saharan Africa.

As of 2021, the Congo has 1,811 million barrels of proven crude oil reserves. Their crude oil production is measured at 267 thousand barrels per day. The accompanying downstream oil industry is an important element in the country's economy. It is predominantly run by foreign companies and centered on the coastal city of Pointe-Noire where the Congolaise de Raffinage (Coraf) operates the 21,000 bpd Pointe Noire refinery.

=== Oil operators ===
==== Aiteo ====
Integrated, global-focused Nigerian energy conglomerate founded in February 2008.

==== Perenco ====
- Total production 25,000 barrels (4,000 m^{3}) of oil per day As of April 2012
  - Emeraude Field: Perenco acquired the Emeraude field in 2001. steam injection into the wells commenced in 2010.
  - Yombo Field: Perenco has operated the Conkouati FPSO offshore on behalf of Marnie 1 since 2001. Production level is 100,000 barrels (16,000 m^{3}) of oil per day
  - Likoula Field: Perenco took over the operation of the Likouala Flied in 2010. The Likouala oil field is located 20 km south of the Emeraude Field. Production 8,000 barrels (1,300 m^{3}) of oil per day
  - Marine IV: Perenco acquired the exploration permit in December 2004. Seismic interpretations have shown promising indications of oil structures.

Zenith Energy

Independent energy company registered in Canada. In May 2020, the company acquired the local Anglo-African Oil & Gas Co. S.A.U. (AAOG Congo). It has recently renewed its license to operate the "Tilapia I" field, which is being renamed "Tilapia II" under the new license, and is the company's only field in the Congo.

==== Total ====
- Djeno Terminal: Operated by Total, the terminal can accommodate Very Large Crude Carrier Loading. Current production is around 25 thousand barrels a day. LOCODE CGDJE Channel Depth 23.2, tide 8m.
- Moho-Bilondo: The first deep-water field to be opened in the Congo, which came online in 2008. Production in 2010 equals 90,000 barrels per day. Operated from a floating production unit 34 meters wide and 12.5 meters high. Located 80 km offshore from the Republic of Congo. Project partners: Total 53.5%, Chevron 31.5%, SNPC 15%.

==== Eni ====
Eni recently announced that it will launch a pilot Oiuls project in 2012. In 2008, Eni and the Congolese Government signed a deal to explore and develop the oil sands deposit located in Tchikiatanga, with an estimated development cost of $3b. In 2008, Eni began constructing two gas-powered electric power stations. 300 mW power station, Centrale Electrique du Congo, powered from the M'Boundo deposit. Eni currently operates the Nene Marine field located in the Marine XVII block offshore Congo.

==== Pharos Energy ====
Block: Marine XI Location: North Congo Basin, offshore Congo (Brazzaville). The Marine XI Block is situated adjacent to the coast in shallow waters with depths ranging up to 110 meters and covering approximately 1,400 square kilometers. Operational phase: Exploration/appraisal SOCO interest: 40.39% (SOCO EPC – Operator) Project partners: World Natural Resources 23.00%, Africa Oil & Gas 13.11%, Petrovietnam 8.50%, SNPC 15%.

==== Dalbit Petroleum ====
Dalbit Petroleum supplies its petroleum products in Eastern DRC through a partnership with Congo Petrol SPRL and directly supplies its products in North Eastern DRC. Dalbit Petroleum supplies remote regions including Kibali, Twangiza, and Namoya. In partnership with Congo Petrol SPRL Dalbit Petroleum has provided shelters at Lubumbashi International Airport.

=== Natural gas ===
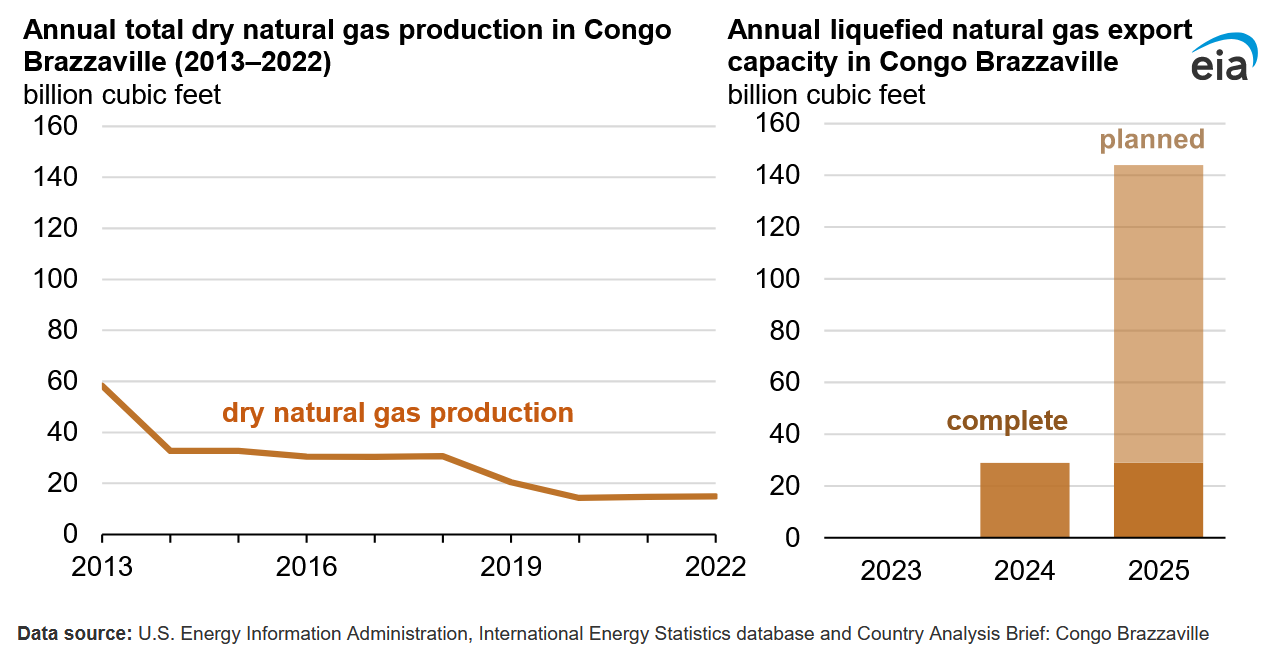
Natural gas production in Congo

Congo holds the fifth-largest proved reserves of natural gas in Sub-Saharan Africa, at 3.2 Tcf, A majority of natural gas around 65% is reinjected and 21% flared.
