= Teerlinck =

Teerlinck is a surname. Notable people with the surname include:

- Hilde Teerlinck (born 1966), Belgian curator
- John Teerlinck (1951–2020), American football player and coach
- Martijn William Zimri Teerlinck (1987–013), known professionally as The Child of Lov or Cole Williams, Dutch poet and musician

== See also ==
- Teerlinc, surname
- Teerlink, surname
