= 2015 6 Hours of Spa-Francorchamps =

Sports car endurance race in Belgium

Coordinates: 50°26′14″N 5°58′17″E

(Belgium) 6 Hours of Spa-Francorchamps of 2015
Event information
- Round 2 of 8 in the 2015 FIA World Endurance Championship
- Date: 2 May 2015
- Location: Stavelot
- Venue: Circuit de Spa-Francorchamps
- Duration: 6 Hours

Results
- Laps completed: 176
- Distance (km): 1232.704
- Distance (miles): 765.952
- LMP1

Pole position
- Time: 1:54.767
- Team: (Germany) Porsche Team
- Drivers: (Germany) Timo Bernhard (New Zealand) Brendon Hartley

Winners
- Team: (Germany) Audi Sport Team Joest
- Drivers: (Germany) André Lotterer (Switzerland) Marcel Fässler (France) Benoît Tréluyer
- LMP2

Winners
- Team: (United Kingdom) Jota Sport
- Drivers: (United Kingdom) Simon Dolan (United Kingdom) Harry Tincknell (New Zealand) Mitch Evans
- LMGTE Pro

Winners
- Team: (United Kingdom) Aston Martin Racing V8
- Drivers: (Brazil) Fernando Rees (United Kingdom) Alex MacDowall (New Zealand) Richie Stanaway
- LMGTE Am

Winners
- Team: (United Kingdom) Aston Martin Racing
- Drivers: (Canada) Paul Dalla Lana (Portugal) Pedro Lamy (Austria) Mathias Lauda

The 2015 6 Hours of Spa-Francorchamps, formally the WEC 6 Heures de Spa-Francorchamps, was a six-hour endurance sports car racing event held for Le Mans Prototype and Le Mans Grand Touring Endurance cars on 2 May at the Circuit de Spa-Francorchamps in Stavelot, Belgium. Spa-Francorchamps hosted the second race of the 2015 FIA World Endurance Championship with 54,000 people attending the race weekend.

The No. 17 Porsche of Timo Bernhard, Brendon Hartley, and Mark Webber qualified in pole position and maintained the lead until it was issued with a stop-and-go penalty, allowing Marc Lieb, Romain Dumas and Neel Jani to take over the lead. Audi's No. 7 car of André Lotterer, Marcel Fässler and Benoît Tréluyer took over the lead when Jani made a scheduled pit stop. Lotterer and Lieb battled for the position until the former made a pit stop that had Tréluyer assume his driving duties. He overtook Lieb to move to the front of the race where he remained for the rest of the event to win after Audi elected to keep him on track. Lieb, Dumas and Jani finished second and Bernhard, Hartley and Webber was third. Lotterer, Fässler and Tréluyer covered a record-breaking track distance of 765.967 miles (1,232.704 km) over 176 laps.

The Le Mans Prototype 2 (LMP2) category was won by the No. 38 Jota Sport of Simon Dolan, Harry Tincknell and Mitch Evans. The car was penalised for jumping the start, but Evans took the class lead after passing co-pole sitter Julien Canal in the No. 26 G-Drive Racing entry and held it for most of the race to earn his first category win in the World Endurance Championship; while it was Dolan and Tincknell's second in the sport. The No. 99 Aston Martin Racing car of Fernando Rees, Richie Stanaway and Alex MacDowall took the victory in the Le Mans Grand Touring Professional (LMGTE Pro) class, their first in the World Endurance Championship. Porsche Team Manthley's cars finished second and third after Gianmaria Bruni was penalised for a pit stop infringement, and Darren Turner in the No. 97 Aston Martin entered the pit lane. The Le Mans Grand Touring Amateur (LMGTE Am) category was won by Paul Dalla Lana, Pedro Lamy and Mathias Lauda, ahead of AF Corse's No. 83 Ferrari of François Perrodo, Emmanuel Collard and Rui Águas.

The result meant Lotterer, Fässler and Tréluyer extended their Drivers' Championship advantage over Lieb, Dumas and Jani to be 14 points ahead of the three drivers. Alexander Wurz, Mike Conway and Stéphane Sarrazin moved from fourth to third with their Toyota teammates Anthony Davidson and Sébastien Buemi dropping to fourth position. Bernhard's, Hartley's and Webber's third-place finish meant they moved into fifth place. Audi moved further ahead of Porsche in the Manufacturers' Championship while Toyota dropped to third position with six races left in the season.

== Background ==
=== Entrants ===
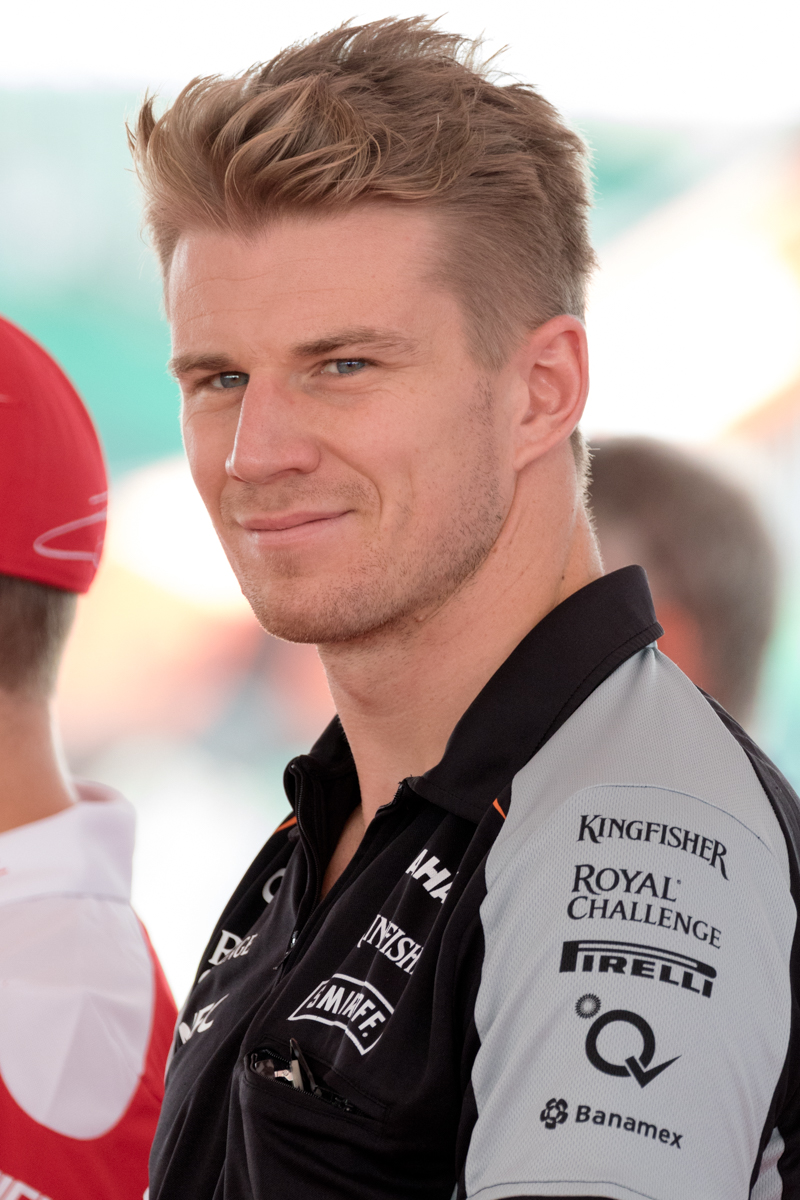
Nico Hülkenberg (pictured in 2016) made his first sports car racing appearance at Spa-Francorchamps.

A total of thirty-four cars were officially entered for the 6 Hours of Spa-Francorchamps, with the bulk of the entries in Le Mans Prototype 1 (LMP1) and Le Mans Prototype 2 (LMP2). The 2014 race winners, Toyota, returned to defend their title. Three manufacturers were represented in LMP1, including a trio of cars entered by Audi Sport Team Joest and Porsche, while Toyota elected to bring only two vehicles. René Rast, Marco Bonanomi and Filipe Albuquerque made their first appearances in the 2015 championship driving the No. 9 Audi, while Nico Hülkenberg, Earl Bamber and Nick Tandy in Porsche's No. 19 car all entered the LMP1 category for the first time in their careers. As in Silverstone, Rebellion Racing chose not to take part in the event, leaving Team ByKolles as the sole LMP1 privateer team. Christian Klien returned to compete for Team ByKolles having originally intended to race for the team only at Silverstone.

LMP2 consisted of ten cars with 30 drivers. With Tandy driving for Porsche, KCMG employed Toyota's test and reserve driver Nicolas Lapierre to fill his position for the Spa-Francorchamps race and the 24 Hours of Le Mans. GP2 Series driver Mitch Evans made his first appearance in sports car racing alongside European Le Mans Series competitor Simon Dolan, and Nissan factory driver Harry Tincknell for Jota Sport. Despite a failed buyout of the team by Kairos, a data encryption company, Team SARD Morand confirmed their commitment to the World Endurance Championship and opted to bring one car which was driven by Oliver Webb, Pierre Ragues and Zoël Amberg. Johannes van Overbeek returned to co-drive for Extreme Speed Motorsports after missing the season's opening round because of a rib injury.

The Le Mans Grand Touring Endurance Professional (LMGTE Pro) field consisted of three manufacturers (Aston Martin, Ferrari and Porsche), while the Le Mans Grand Touring Endurance Amateur (LMGTE Am) entrants were six teams: Aston Martin Racing, AF Corse, Larbre Compétition, Dempsey-Racing Proton, Porsche Team Manthley, and SMP Racing. The No. 91 Porsche 911 was vacated after regular driver Michael Christensen missed the Spa race because of a United SportsCar Championship commitment, while Richard Lietz moved to the team's No. 92 entry and the car was driven by Sven Müller and Kévin Estre. Nicki Thiim was unable to attend the event because he was taking part in the ADAC GT Masters Championship, so the No. 95 Aston Martin was driven as a two-driver operation by Marco Sørensen and Christoffer Nygaard. The team's No. 97 entry became a three-person driver team when McLaren factory driver Rob Bell made his first start of the year alongside Stefan Mücke and Darren Turner. Ferrari's factory team AF Corse entered a second car in LMGTE Am which was driven by Duncan Cameron, Alex Mortimer and Matt Griffin.

=== Preview ===
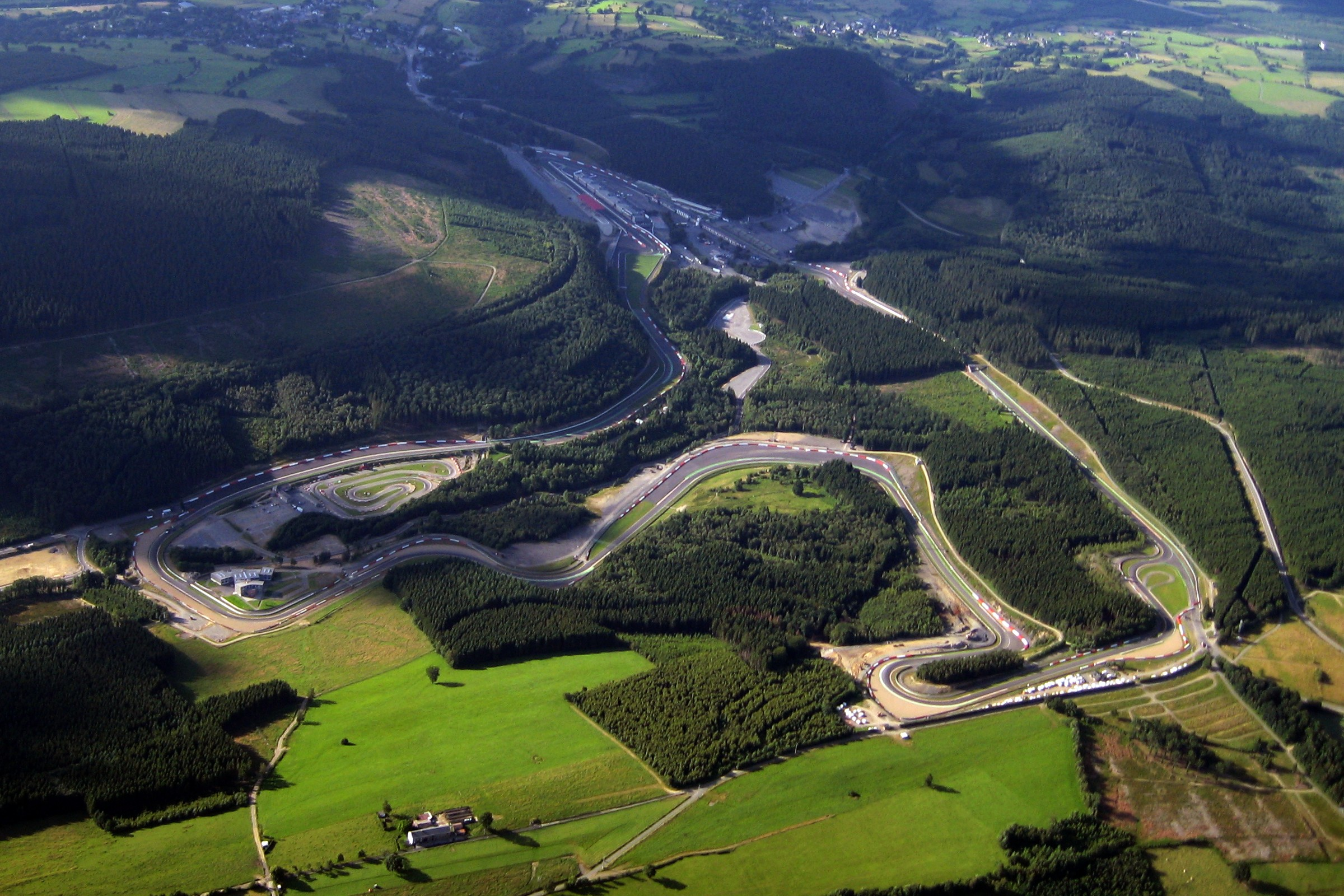
Circuit de Spa-Francorchamps, where the race was held.

The 6 Hours of Spa-Francorchamps was confirmed as part of the FIA World Endurance Championship's 2015 schedule in an FIA World Motor Sport Council meeting in Doha on 3 December 2014. It was the second of eight scheduled endurance sports car races of the 2015 FIA World Endurance Championship, and the fourth running of the event as part of the championship. It was held on 2 May 2015 at the 20-turn 7.004 km (4.352 mi) Circuit de Spa-Francorchamps in Stavelot, Belgium following two days of practice and qualifying.

Endurance racing events were first held at the Circuit de Spa-Francorchamps in 1924 with the Spa 24 Hours. Thirty-nine years later, the track began holding 500 km (310 mi) World Sportscar Championship races which later expanded to 1,000 km (620 mi). It was cancelled after the 1975 running because of modern safety concerns. It was resurrected in 1982 on the reconfigured Spa-Francorchamps track layout and remained on the calendar until 1990. Spa-Francorchamps again began holding endurance sports car races from 1999, and the 6 Hour event was made part of the FIA World Endurance Championship in 2012. The race is considered by many as a final preparation event for the 24 Hours of Le Mans.

Before the race Audi Sport Team Joest drivers André Lotterer, Marcel Fässler and Benoît Tréluyer led the Drivers' Championship with 25 points, seven ahead of their nearest rivals Marc Lieb, Romain Dumas and Neel Jani in second, and a further three in front of third-placed Anthony Davidson, Sébastien Buemi and Kazuki Nakajima. Their teammates Alexander Wurz, Mike Conway and Stéphane Sarrazin were fourth on 12 points, and Loïc Duval, Lucas di Grassi and Oliver Jarvis stood in fifth place on ten points. Audi led the Manufacturers' Championship with 35 points, seven ahead of rival Toyota in second; the third-placed manufacturer Porsche had scored 19 points. Audi had won the preceding 6 Hours of Silverstone with Lieb, Dumas and Jani finishing in second place, while Davidson, Buemi and Nakajima came in third position.

Some teams made modifications to their cars in preparation for the event. Audi installed low-downforce setups on its No. 7 and 8 cars while their third entry used a version observed at the Silverstone race. The design was optimised to omit downforce, thereby reducing drag, for better preparation for competing on high-speed tracks. This was done by modifying the car's side pods and openings on the inside surface of its fenders. New cooling techniques were achieved by creating new suspension solutions to restrict spring displacement which also reduced underside turbulent airflow. Porsche chose to use high downforce configurations on all three of their 919 Hybrid cars as they did previously at Silverstone. The revised ByKolles CLM P1/01 LMP1 car was further developed and had a new front nose equipped after it completed a shakedown test on 24 April ahead of his debut in Belgium.

== Practice ==
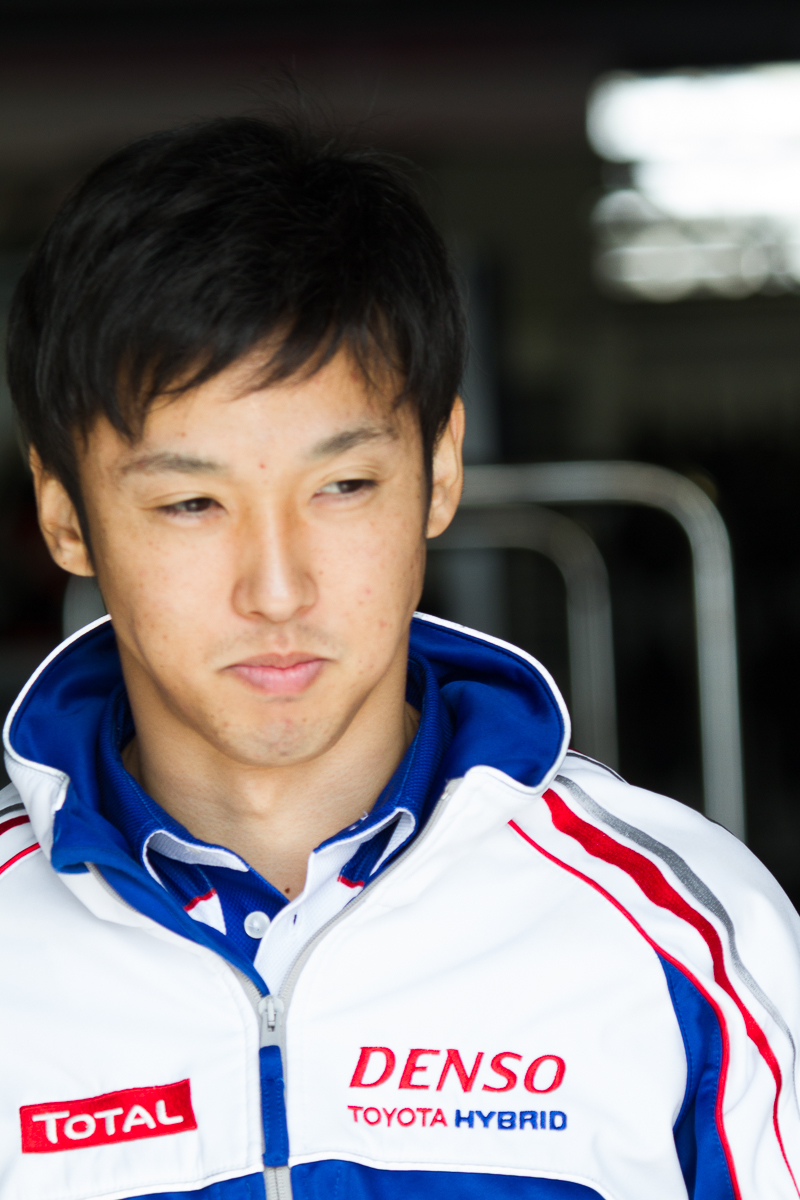
Kazuki Nakajima (pictured in 2012) withdrew from the race after fracturing his vertebra in a free practice incident.

There were three practice sessions—one 90-minute session each on Thursday afternoon and evening and a one-hour session on Friday afternoon—preceding Saturday's race. The first session was held in heavy rain. Lieb's No. 18 Porsche lapped fastest at 2:16.616, ahead of Davidson's No. 1 Toyota in second. Brendon Hartley and Hülkenberg in Porsche's two other cars were third and fourth; Rast's No. 9 Audi rounded out the top five. LMP2 was led by Jonny Kane's No. 42 Strakka Racing Nissan with a lap of 2:32.672; he battled with Tincknell for the quickest class time. Estre's Porsche was the quickest in LMGTE Pro while Klaus Bachler helped the German company to be the fastest in LMGTE Am.

The session was disrupted when Nakajima drove into the back-end of Jarvis's car heading into Les Combes corner in a 12G impact. Nakajima was unable to see Jarvis because of heavy spray reducing visibility on the Kemmel straight. Nakajima complained of severe back pain and was transported to Verviers hospital where a check-up found he had fractured vertebra. He was deemed unfit to take part in the race. Toyota's test and reserve driver Kamui Kobayashi was in Japan and unavailable, so the No. 1 car ran as a two-driver operation for the remainder of the event weekend. It missed the second practice session because it required monocoque rebuilding. The No. 8 Audi also missed the second practice session because it was undergoing rear-end repairs.

Heavy rain continued to affect the track in the second practice session. Conditions deteriorated as the session advanced, and several cars elected not to improve their quickest times to avoid driving off the track after going through standing water. Conditions allowed the fastest LMP2 and LMGTE vehicles to reach the top five quickest overall times. Bamber recorded the fastest time at 2:25.495, nearly half a second faster than Bernhard in the sister Porsche in second. Lotterer was third-fastest and had the fastest time early in the session. Evans achieved the only time under the 2:34.500 mark in LMP2 with a lap of 2:34.370. Lietz led LMGTE Pro with No. 83 AF Corse Ferrari of Rui Águas the fastest driver in LMGTE Am.

The final practice was held on a dry race track which allowed for faster lap times. Lotterer set the quickest time of the weekend so far at 1:57.368 recorded in the session's final minute, and was 0.011 seconds faster than the second-fastest car of Hülkenberg. Jani was a further five-tenths of a second behind in third place, and was narrowly faster than teammate Hartley in fourth. Sam Bird was the fastest LMP2 driver in the No. 26 G-Drive Racing car with a time of 2:08.415, four-tenths ahead of Matthew Howson's KCMG Oreca. Toni Vilander recorded the quickest LMGTE Pro time ahead of Fernando Rees in the No. 97 Aston Martin, while Pedro Lamy, driving the British marque's No. 98 car, was the fastest driver in LMGTE Am. A brief full course yellow flag was displayed when Bachler's back-end collided with the Pouhon corner tyre barrier, while Turner avoided going into the Les Combes wall and was temporarily beached in the turn's gravel trap. Both drivers returned to the track and continued.

== Qualifying ==
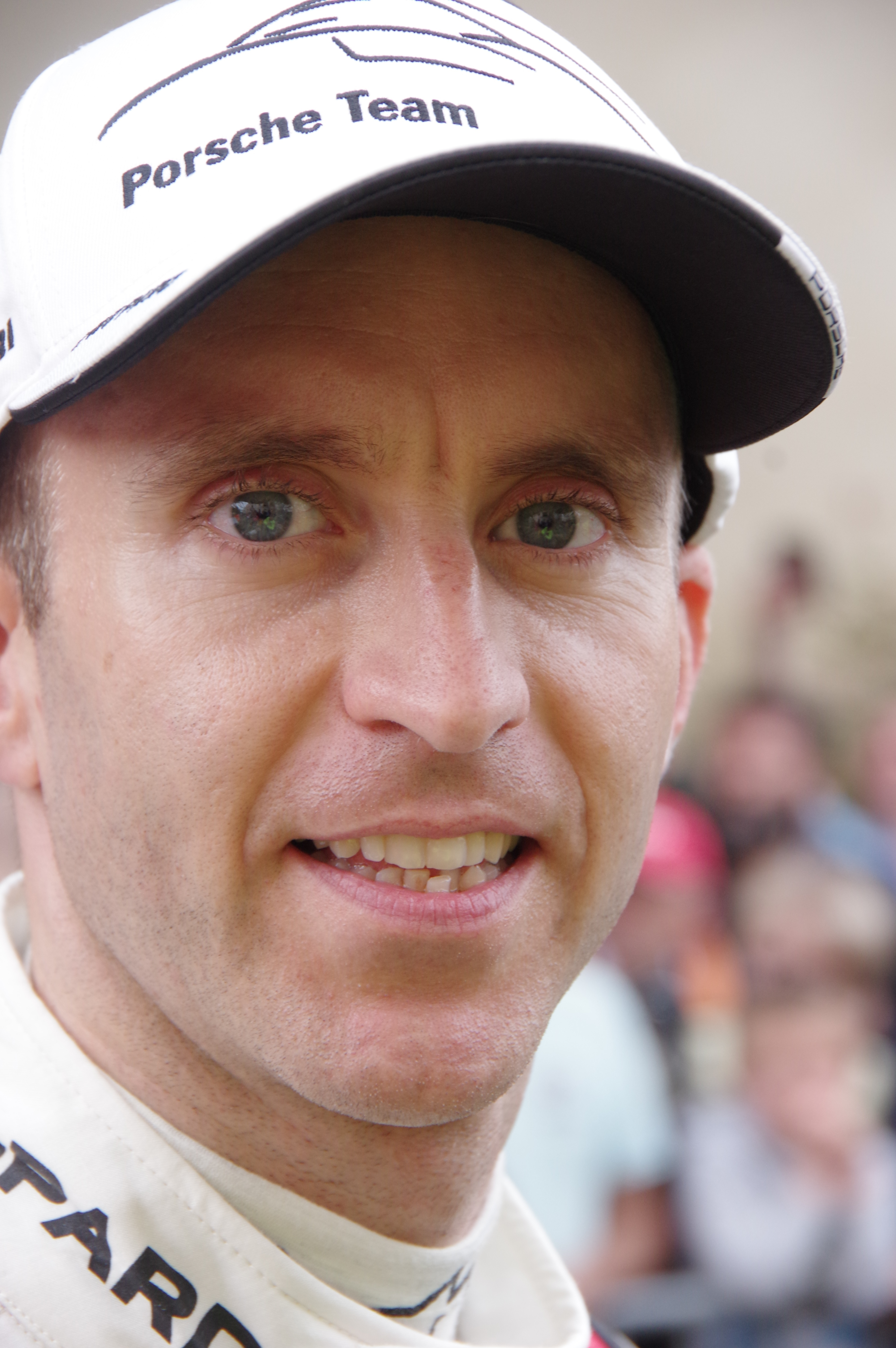
Timo Bernhard (pictured in 2016) clinched the third consecutive pole position of his and his co-driver's careers.

Friday's late afternoon qualification session was divided into two groups lasting 25 minutes each. Cars in LMGTE Pro and AM were sent out first and, after a five-minute interval, LMP1 and LMP2 vehicles drove onto the track. All cars were required to be driven by two participants for one timed lap each, with the starting order determined by the competitors' fastest average times. The fastest qualifier was awarded one point which went towards the Drivers' and Manufacturers' Championships. The session took place in clear, mild and dry weather. Hülkenberg's first timed lap of 1:55.130 surpassed the LMP1 pole position record time only to be surpassed by Hartley's 1:54.777 lap time to place the No. 17 Porsche in provisional pole position. Bernhard took over from Hartley and recorded a lap that was 0.027 seconds faster than the latter lowering the car's two-lap average time to 1:54.767 clinching pole position. It was the third consecutive event where Bernhard, Mark Webber and Hartley started from pole position.

They were joined on the grid's front row by the sister No. 19 car after Tandy set a lap time at the session's conclusion that put him 0.257 seconds behind his teammates. Jani and Lieb qualified in third position, three-tenths of a second slower than the two sister Porsche cars. Lotterer twice went onto the track and improved his first lap time by 0.116 seconds to 1:55.114, while Fässler was unable to find a rhythm, and could not improve on his co-driver's fastest time, restricting them to qualifying fourth. Duval and di Grassi took fifth place with the latter stating that the team was not happy with the No. 8 car's setup, and that overnight work had to be undertaken. Davidson and Buemi held fifth place until di Grassi and Duval's lap times demoted them to sixth. Conway and Sarrazin secured seventh with the latter saying that he was held up by slower cars on his two timed laps. Albuquerque and Rast filled the grid's fourth row by qualifying eighth ahead of the No. 4 Team ByKolles car.

In LMP2, Bird and Julien Canal took the fastest two-lap average time of 2:07.761; Canal pushed hard on new tyres during his second timed run having disliked his previous attempt. The pair were two-tenths of a second faster than the second-place qualifiers, Howson and Lapierre, and held the class pole position until Canal's lap. Team SARD Morand's No. 43 car took third in the category, while the second G-Drive Racing entry was fourth, with fifth-placed qualifier Tincknell recording the session's best class individual lap time. Richie Stanaway and Rees, competing in the No. 99 Aston Martin, were the fastest LMGTE Pro qualifiers with a two-lap average time of 2:16.840. Gianmaria Bruni was 0.070 seconds off the Aston Martin's pace, and started from second place in the category, displacing Turner and Mücke from the position. Turner's fastest lap was invalidated after he went off the track and was required to set another time. James Calado and Davide Rigon secured fourth in AF Corse's No. 71 Ferrari with Sørensen and Nygaard rounding out the top five. Aston Martin's No. 98 entry driven by Paul Dalla Lana and Lamy took pole position in LMGTE Am, more than a second faster than the No. 50 Larbre Compétition Corvette of Paolo Ruberti and Gianluca Roda.

=== Post-qualifying ===
KCMG's No 47 car had its qualifying lap times disallowed after it was discovered in post-qualifying scrutineering that the vehicle's front skid block had insufficient rigidity and had been excessively flexible. The penalty meant Team SARD Morand's No. 43 car was promoted to second in LMP2 and the No. 47 entry was required to start from the pit lane with a 30-second time penalty.

=== Qualifying results ===
Pole position winners in each class are indicated in bold.

Final qualifying classification
Pos	Class	Team	Average Time	Gap	Grid
1	**LMP1**	**No. 17 Porsche Team**	**1:54.767**		**1**
2	LMP1	No. 19 Porsche Team	1:55.025	+0.258	2
3	LMP1	No. 18 Porsche Team	1:55.284	+0.517	3
4	LMP1	No. 7 Audi Sport Team Joest	1:55.540	+0.773	4
5	LMP1	No. 8 Audi Sport Team Joest	1:56.541	+1.774	5
6	LMP1	No. 1 Toyota Racing	1:57.487	+2.720	6
7	LMP1	No. 2 Toyota Racing	1:57.929	+3.162	7
8	LMP1	No. 9 Audi Sport Team Joest	1:58.000	+3.233	8
9	LMP1	No. 4 Team ByKolles	2:07.286	+12.519	9
10	**LMP2**	**No. 26 G-Drive Racing**	**2:07.761**	**+12.994**	**10**
11	LMP2	No. 43 Team SARD Morand	2:08.055	+13.288	11
12	LMP2	No. 28 G-Drive Racing	2:08.258	+13.491	12
13	LMP2	No. 38 Jota Sport	2:08.329	+13.562	13
14	LMP2	No. 36 Signatech Alpine	2:08.901	+14.134	14
15	LMP2	No. 30 Extreme Speed Motorsports	2:09.989	+15.222	15
16	LMP2	No. 42 Strakka Racing	2:11.655	+16.888	16
17	LMP2	No. 31 Extreme Speed Motorsports	2:16.721	+21.954	17
18	**LMGTE Pro**	**No. 99 Aston Martin Racing V8**	**2:16.840**	**+22.074**	**18**
19	LMGTE Pro	No. 51 AF Corse	2:16.910	+22.143	19
20	LMGTE Pro	No. 97 Aston Martin Racing	2:17.231	+22.464	20
21	LMGTE Pro	No. 71 AF Corse	2:17.526	+22.759	21
22	LMGTE Pro	No. 95 Aston Martin Racing	2:17.757	+22.990	22
23	LMGTE Pro	No. 91 Porsche Team Manthey	2:18.025	+23.258	23
24	LMGTE Pro	No. 92 Porsche Team Manthey	2:18.038	+23.271	24
25	LMP2	No. 35 OAK Racing	2:18.487	+23.720	25
26	**LMGTE Am**	**No. 98 Aston Martin Racing**	**2:19.578**	**+24.811**	**26**
27	LMGTE Am	No. 50 Larbre Compétition	2:20.694	+25.927	27
28	LMGTE Am	No. 88 Abu Dhabi-Proton Racing	2:21.142	+26.665	28
29	LMGTE Am	No. 55 AF Corse	2:21.893	+27.126	29
30	LMGTE Am	No. 83 AF Corse	2:21.958	+27.191	30
31	LMGTE Am	No. 72 SMP Racing	2:22.909	+28.142	31
32	LMGTE Am	No. 77 Dempsey Racing-Proton	2:23.303	+28.536	32
33	LMGTE Am	No. 96 Aston Martin Racing	2:24.519	+29.752	33
–	LMP2	No. 47 KCMG	No Time	–	PL^{1}

^1 – The No. 47 KCMG had all its laptimes deleted because of insufficient rigidity of the front skid block and started from the pit lane.

== Race ==
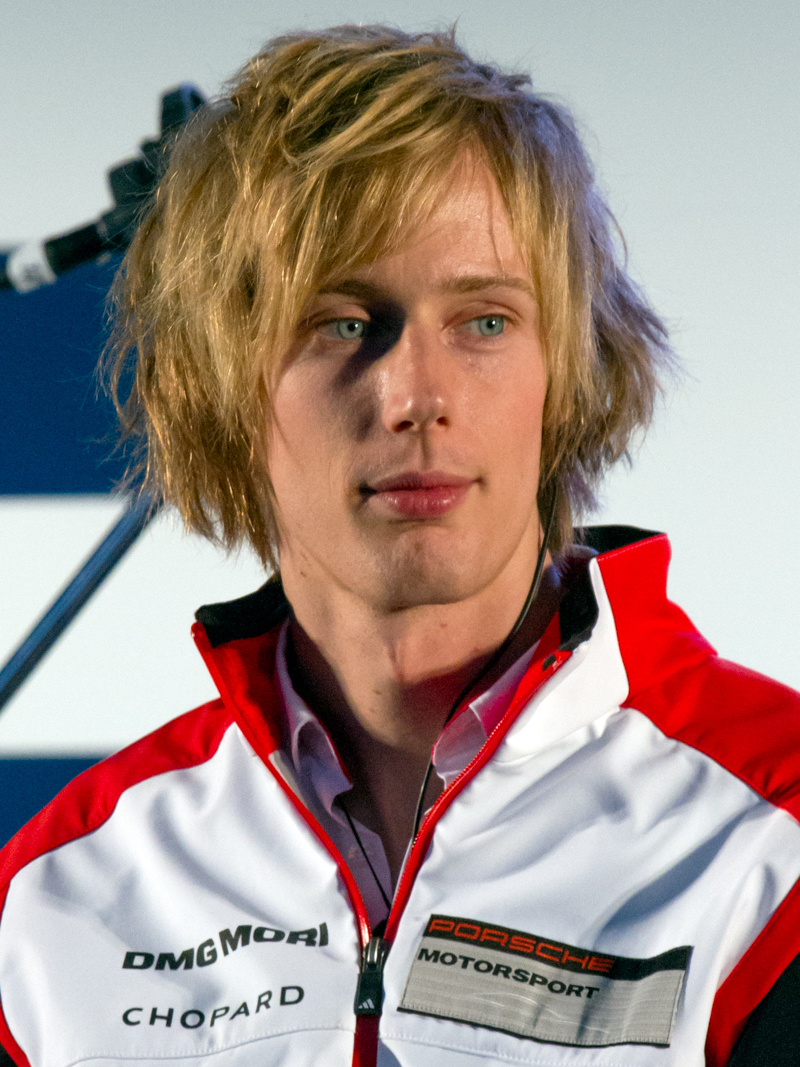
Brendon Hartley (pictured in 2014) held the lead in the race's early stages, but was penalised for going off the track causing danger to marshals.

Weather conditions at the start of the race were dry and cloudy with an air temperature ranging from 12.6 to 14.1 °C (54.7 to 57.4 °F) and a track temperature between 13.3 to 16.1 °C (55.9 to 61.0 °F); a 50 per cent chance of rain was forecast. 54,000 people attended the race weekend. The race began at 14:30 Central European Summer Time (UTC+02:00).

Hartley maintained his pole position advantage heading into the first turn. Lieb passed Tandy to take over second position, while Fässler moved to third, after passing Tandy at the Bus Stop chicane at the first lap's conclusion. Tandy reclaimed third from Fässler shortly afterward. Team SARD Morand held the LMP2 lead before its car was overtaken by Tincknell and Bird on lap two. Duval moved in front of Wurz for fifth and the Toyota driver dropped to seventh. Jota Sport was issued with a drive-through penalty after its car driven by Tincknell was adjudged to have jumped the start and rejoined in sixth in LMP2, allowing Bird to the front of the category. Tandy drove to the inside of Estre to lap him, but made head-on contact with his car and went straight into the Pif Paf corner barrier. Both drivers continued, but Tandy drove into the pit lane for repairs, falling to the rear of the field. Fässler battled with Lieb for second as the two moved through slower traffic, but the Audi driver spun at the Bus Stop chicane allowing Lieb to take over second. Ryan Dalziel brought the No. 30 Extreme Speed Motorsports car into the team's garage to allow his mechanics to replace a broken boost line falling to the rear of the LMP2 field.

Most of the field elected to make their first scheduled pit stops before the first hour had passed. Hartley went straight on at the Bus Stop chicane after locking his front brakes. He rejoined the track by driving onto the escape road and through a marshal's post. This prompted the stewards to call Hartley up to their office and he went up after he was relieved. Fässler crossed the white line at the pit lane entry, which led to Audi receiving a reprimand from the stewards. Tincknell moved back into second place in LMP2 and separated both G-Drive cars. Roald Goethe went backwards into the Eau Rouge corner exit barrier after taking over from Stuart Hall, requiring lengthy repairs to his car.

Estre was issued with a drive-through penalty after he was adjudged to have caused the collision between himself and Tandy. Tandy stopped his Porsche briefly at the pit lane entry, while Bonanomi went wide driving up to Radallion corner battling Wurz for sixth. The incident involving Hartley handed the No. 17 Porsche a 15-second, stop-and-go penalty as he was deemed not to have respected track limits and causing danger to marshals. Bernhard took the penalty on the 17th lap, promoting teammate Jani to the lead. Evans moved to the front of the LMP2 field after overtaking Canal heading into the Bus Stop chicane. Fässler ceded third position to Duval at Les Combes corner.

Bernhard was caught by Duval and used his car's hybrid boost system on the Kemmel straight, moving ahead of the German under braking for Les Combes corner. Fässler briefly pressured Bernhard before entering the pit lane for a scheduled stop and Lotterer took over his seat. Lotterer lapped in the 1:58 second range which allowed him to run 12 seconds behind leader Dumas. Bonanomi's left-hand window became detached on the Kemmel straight, necessitating an extra pit stop for a replacement window. Patrick Dempsey spun the No. 77 car at the Bus Stop chicane, forcing several drivers to take avoiding action. Trummer drove into his garage with back-end technical problems with his car and retired. Dempsey's co-driver Marco Seefried spun and heavily struck the left-hand turn tyre barrier before Pouhon corner.

Dumas extended his advantage over Lotterer to 19 seconds, while Canal reclaimed the LMP2 lead when Evans made a scheduled pit stop. Lotterer made a pit stop for tyres and fuel. Dumas and Jarvis reacted shortly afterwards. Di Grassi took over from Jarvis, while Lotterer gained five seconds on Dumas. While switching drivers from Bernhard to Webber, Porsche changed a problematic damper on the No. 17 car. Approaching Blanchimont corner Kristian Poulsen went backwards into the barrier after colliding with a G-Drive Racing car that was lapping him. This prompted a localised yellow caution flag, and enabled Aleksey Basov and Khaled Al Qubaisi to inherit second and third places in LMGTE Am. Rigon was lapping Al Qubaisi at the Bus Stop chicane, but the Porsche driver drove defensively and both cars spun. Bruni reduced his speed to avoid colliding with the stationary cars.

Webber passed Rast for sixth place, while Poulsen retired because of accident damage while attempting to return to the pit lane. Dumas held a 24-second advantage over Lotterer with di Grassi in third, while Evans moved back into the LMP2 lead. Both Toyota cars were battling for fourth position with Webber close behind. Webber overtook Davidson for fifth at the Radillion corner exit moving ahead of Sarrazin on the Kemmel straight one lap later. Di Grassi slowed with technical problems and limped into his garage for an engine control unit and front-left nose change. Toyota's No. 1 car was pushed into its garage with mechanical problems; it rejoined the circuit for a few laps until a throttle problem emerged, causing the car to run at a reduced pace. Lotterer retook the lead after the No. 18 Porsche driver switch took longer than expected. Rast passed Conway around the outside for fourth at the Bus Stop chicane. Vilander challenged Lietz for second in LMGTE Pro until Vilander was issued a track limit abuse penalty. Lotterer and Lieb battled each other for first place. Lotterer drove defensively after passing slower traffic going into Les Combes corner to keep the position. Lieb ran wide off the track at the Stavelot corner exit while lapping a slower car.

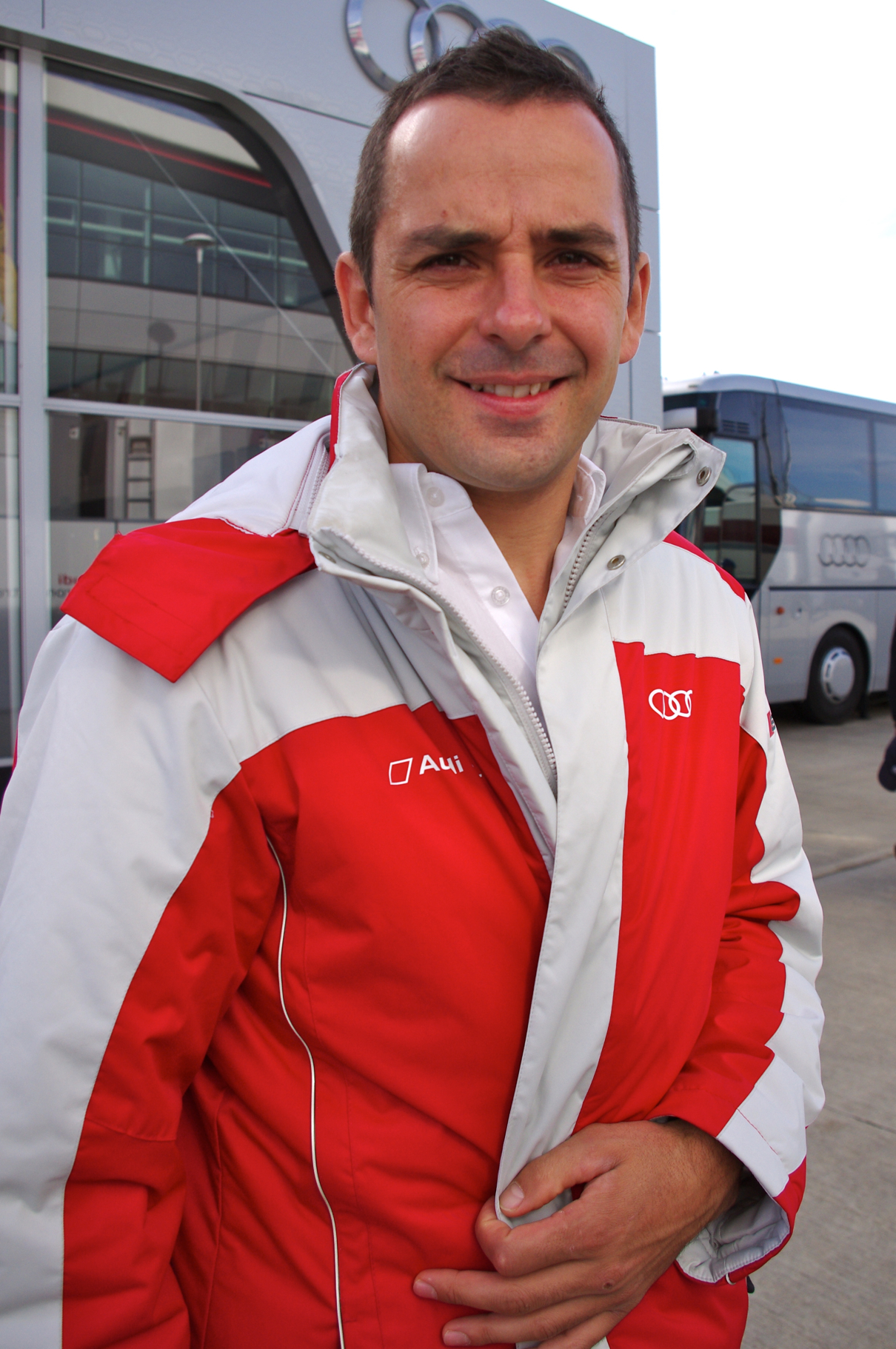
Benoît Tréluyer (pictured in 2013) took the victory for the No. 7 Audi team.

Tréluyer took over from Lotterer during a pit stop and Lieb regained the lead. Tréluyer caught Lieb and passed him around the outside at La Source corner, holding the lead until Lieb reclaimed it by employing his car's hybrid boost system to overtake him on the Kemmel straight. Tréluyer managed to take over the first position when he got ahead of Lieb around the outside of Pif Paf corner, despite the two making earlier contact at Pouhon corner. Lieb made a pit stop for new tyres and Jani climbed aboard the No. 18 car. Bruni passed Bell to move into second in LMGTE Pro. Smoke bellowed from the left exhaust of Bird's car, and he drove to his garage for diagnosis. Bruni reduced the time deficit to Alex MacDowall and passed him by using the Bus Stop chicane kerbs to claim the LMGTE Pro lead. Tréluyer was under eight seconds in front of Lieb as the final hour began. Lapierre moved ahead of Paul-Loup Chatin to take over fourth place in LMP2, while Jani reduced the time deficit to two seconds in arrears of Tréluyer on lap 154. He passed him with hybrid boost assistance on the Kemmel straight on the following lap. Audi elected to keep Tréluyer on track when Lieb made a pit stop for fuel. He remained there until lap 164 when he stopped for fuel but not tyres. Jarvis went straight into Stavelot corner's barriers in the event's closing two minutes.

Tréluyer maintained the lead for the rest of the race winning after completing 176 laps at a track record-breaking distance of 765.967 miles (1,232.704 km). Jani finished second, 13.424 seconds adrift of the No. 7 Audi, and Bernhard completed the podium positions by finishing third, albeit one lap behind. It was Audi's second consecutive overall series' victory of the season. Unchallenged in the closing stages, Jota Sport were victorious in LMP2, one lap ahead of the second-place G-Drive Racing car of Gustavo Yacamán, Ricardo González and Pipo Derani, and third-position finishers Webb, Ragues and Amberg of Team SARD Morand. It was Evans's first LMP2 victory in the World Endurance Championship, while it was Tincknell and Dolan's second in the series.

Bruni was issued with a one-minute, stop-and-go penalty because a mechanic lost grip in trying to rectify an issue with the right-rear wheel nut and dropped his wheel gun over the white line demarcating the pit lane's working zone after pulling it off the axle. Rees took over the class lead which he maintained to clinch victory in LMGTE Pro. Turner held third, but made a pit stop, allowing Lietz and Muller to finish in second and third places in the category. This was Rees's, Stanaway's and MacDowall's first class victories in the World Endurance Championship. Aston Martin finished as the winners in LMGTE Am, ahead of the No. 83 AF Corse of François Perrodo, Emmanuel Collard, and Agias with SMP Racing's No. 72 entry of Viktor Shaitar. Aleksey Basov and Andrea Bertolini completed the class podium positions. Dalla Lana, Mathias Lauda's and Lamy's win was their second consecutive in LMGTE Am.

=== Post-race ===
The top three finishers of all four classes appeared on the podium to collect their trophies and in a later press conference. Tréluyer was delighted with the victory, saying: "What a race, It was a tough lights-to-flag job, just like at Silverstone, but it was huge fun and we’re already looking forward to Le Mans." He further stated: "We did it and I am very happy for the team because we had a really strong weekend and it feels great to win in this fashion." Lotterer said of the result: "It's no holds barred all the time and is very fun, especially at Spa-Francorchamps. It's for this type of race that we hit track." Dumas, who finished in second alongside Lieb and Jani, stated he found driving in dry weather conditions difficult because he was not experienced participating in such conditions. Lieb said his battle with Tréluyer was "great" and said the contact between the two drivers was part of motor racing. Jani stated while he did not win the race he praised his car. Third-place co-finisher Webber said that his team had "too many own goals" and that they did not wanted to be "gifted results" if they were not performing at the highest level. Bernhard said that despite taking the stop-and-go penalty his team did not give up and gave it their best effort to stand on the podium.

Following the first free practice crash between Nakajima and Jarvis, Davidson called for cars to be equipped with brighter flashing rain lights and that what happened to his co-driver was "every driver's worst nightmare". He suggested Formula One rain lights provided by McLaren Electronic Systems were brighter than those employed in the World Endurance Championship. Toyota's technical director Pascal Vasselon believed Nakajima's lack of reaction time along with the absence of flashing rain lights contributed to his injury. Christopher Reinke, Audi Sport's Le Mans Prototype manager, stated such a measure had been discussed but the issue was complex, while the Automobile Club de l'Ouest's (ACO) sporting manager, Vincent Beaumesnil, said he was unsure that brighter lights would have assisted Nakajima. In early June, the sport's governing body, the Fédération Internationale de l'Automobile (FIA) and the ACO, required all Le Mans Prototype cars carry additional flashing rain lights at the rear of their cars from the 24 Hours of Le Mans onward after the FIA's Endurance Committee observed their usage under wet weather conditions and felt there was an improvement in visibility.

The result meant Lotterer, Fässler and Tréluyer increased their Drivers' Championship advantage to 14 points ahead of second-placed Lieb, Jani and Dumas. Wurz, Conway and Sarrazin moved from fourth to third with 22 points, three in front of their teammates Davidson and Buemi. Bernhard's, Webber's and Hartley's third-place finish meant they rounded out the top five with 17 points. Audi increased its lead in the Manufacturers' Championship on 70 points, 17 ahead of their nearest rivals Porsche in second, and a further six in front of third-placed manufacturer Toyota with six races left in the season.

=== Race result ===
The minimum number of laps for classification (70 per cent of the overall winning car's race distance) was 123 laps. Class winners are denoted in bold.

Final race classification
Pos	Class	No	Team	Drivers	Chassis	Tyre	Laps	Time/Retired
Pos	Class	No	Team	Drivers	Engine	Tyre	Laps	Time/Retired
1	**LMP1**	**7**	**(Germany) Audi Sport Team Joest**	**(Germany) André Lotterer (Switzerland) Marcel Fässler (France) Benoît Tréluyer**	**Audi R18 e-tron quattro**	MI	**176**	**06:01:08.896**
1	**LMP1**	**7**	**(Germany) Audi Sport Team Joest**	**(Germany) André Lotterer (Switzerland) Marcel Fässler (France) Benoît Tréluyer**	**Audi TDI 4.0 L Turbo Diesel V6**	MI	**176**	**06:01:08.896**
2	LMP1	18	(Germany) Porsche Team	(Germany) Marc Lieb (France) Romain Dumas (Switzerland) Neel Jani	Porsche 919 Hybrid	MI	176	+13.424
2	LMP1	18	(Germany) Porsche Team	(Germany) Marc Lieb (France) Romain Dumas (Switzerland) Neel Jani	Porsche 2.0 L Turbo V4	MI	176	+13.424
3	LMP1	17	(Germany) Porsche Team	(Germany) Timo Bernhard (New Zealand) Brendon Hartley (Australia) Mark Webber	Porsche 919 Hybrid	MI	175	+1 Lap
3	LMP1	17	(Germany) Porsche Team	(Germany) Timo Bernhard (New Zealand) Brendon Hartley (Australia) Mark Webber	Porsche 2.0 L Turbo V4	MI	175	+1 Lap
4	LMP1	9	(Germany) Audi Sport Team Joest	(Italy) Marco Bonanomi (Portugal) Filipe Albuquerque (Germany) René Rast	Audi R18 e-tron quattro	MI	174	+2 Laps
4	LMP1	9	(Germany) Audi Sport Team Joest	(Italy) Marco Bonanomi (Portugal) Filipe Albuquerque (Germany) René Rast	Audi TDI 4.0 L Turbo Diesel V6	MI	174	+2 Laps
5	LMP1	2	(Japan) Toyota Racing	(Austria) Alexander Wurz (France) Stéphane Sarrazin (United Kingdom) Mike Conway	Toyota TS040 Hybrid	MI	173	+3 Laps
5	LMP1	2	(Japan) Toyota Racing	(Austria) Alexander Wurz (France) Stéphane Sarrazin (United Kingdom) Mike Conway	Toyota 3.7 L V8	MI	173	+3 Laps
6	LMP1	19	(Germany) Porsche Team	(Germany) Nico Hülkenberg (New Zealand) Earl Bamber (United Kingdom) Nick Tandy	Porsche 919 Hybrid	MI	173	+3 Laps
6	LMP1	19	(Germany) Porsche Team	(Germany) Nico Hülkenberg (New Zealand) Earl Bamber (United Kingdom) Nick Tandy	Porsche 2.0 L Turbo V4	MI	173	+3 Laps
7	LMP1	8	(Germany) Audi Sport Team Joest	(France) Loïc Duval (Brazil) Lucas di Grassi (United Kingdom) Oliver Jarvis	Audi R18 e-tron quattro	MI	168	+8 Laps
7	LMP1	8	(Germany) Audi Sport Team Joest	(France) Loïc Duval (Brazil) Lucas di Grassi (United Kingdom) Oliver Jarvis	Audi TDI 4.0 L Turbo Diesel V6	MI	168	+8 Laps
8	LMP1	1	(Japan) Toyota Racing	(United Kingdom) Anthony Davidson (Switzerland) Sébastien Buemi	Toyota TS040 Hybrid	MI	162	+14 Laps
8	LMP1	1	(Japan) Toyota Racing	(United Kingdom) Anthony Davidson (Switzerland) Sébastien Buemi	Toyota 3.7 L V8	MI	162	+14 Laps
9	**LMP2**	**38**	**(United Kingdom) Jota Sport**	**(United Kingdom) Simon Dolan (United Kingdom) Harry Tincknell (New Zealand) Mitch Evans**	**Gibson 015S**	D	**161**	**+15 Laps**
9	**LMP2**	**38**	**(United Kingdom) Jota Sport**	**(United Kingdom) Simon Dolan (United Kingdom) Harry Tincknell (New Zealand) Mitch Evans**	**Nissan VK45DE 4.5 L V8**	D	**161**	**+15 Laps**
10	LMP2	28	(Russia) G-Drive Racing	(Colombia) Gustavo Yacamán (Mexico) Ricardo González (Brazil) Pipo Derani	Ligier JS P2	D	160	+16 Laps
10	LMP2	28	(Russia) G-Drive Racing	(Colombia) Gustavo Yacamán (Mexico) Ricardo González (Brazil) Pipo Derani	Nissan VK45DE 4.5 L V8	D	160	+16 Laps
11	LMP2	43	(Switzerland) Team SARD Morand	(United Kingdom) Oliver Webb (France) Pierre Ragues (Austria) Zoël Amberg	Morgan LMP2 Evo	D	159	+17 Laps
11	LMP2	43	(Switzerland) Team SARD Morand	(United Kingdom) Oliver Webb (France) Pierre Ragues (Austria) Zoël Amberg	SARD 3.6 L V8	D	159	+17 Laps
12	LMP2	47	(Hong Kong) KCMG	(United Kingdom) Matthew Howson (United Kingdom) Richard Bradley (France) Nicolas Lapierre	Oreca 05	D	159	+17 Laps
12	LMP2	47	(Hong Kong) KCMG	(United Kingdom) Matthew Howson (United Kingdom) Richard Bradley (France) Nicolas Lapierre	Nissan VK45DE 4.5 L V8	D	159	+17 Laps
13	LMP2	36	(France) Signatech Alpine	(France) Nelson Panciatici (France) Paul-Loup Chatin (France) Vincent Capillaire	Alpine A450b	D	159	+17 Laps
13	LMP2	36	(France) Signatech Alpine	(France) Nelson Panciatici (France) Paul-Loup Chatin (France) Vincent Capillaire	Nissan VK45DE 4.5 L V8	D	159	+17 Laps
14	LMP2	42	(United Kingdom) Strakka Racing	(United Kingdom) Nick Leventis (United Kingdom) Jonny Kane (United Kingdom) Danny Watts	Strakka Dome S103	MI	156	+20 Laps
14	LMP2	42	(United Kingdom) Strakka Racing	(United Kingdom) Nick Leventis (United Kingdom) Jonny Kane (United Kingdom) Danny Watts	Nissan VK45DE 4.5 L V8	MI	156	+20 Laps
15	LMP2	35	(France) OAK Racing	(France) Jacques Nicolet (France) Jean-Marc Merlin (France) Erik Maris	Ligier JS P2	D	152	+24 Laps
15	LMP2	35	(France) OAK Racing	(France) Jacques Nicolet (France) Jean-Marc Merlin (France) Erik Maris	Nissan VK45DE 4.5 L V8	D	152	+24 Laps
16	**LMGTE; Pro**	**99**	**(United Kingdom) Aston Martin Racing V8**	**(Brazil) Fernando Rees (United Kingdom) Alex MacDowall (New Zealand) Richie Stanaway**	**Aston Martin V8 Vantage GTE**	MI	**151**	**+25 Laps**
16	**LMGTE; Pro**	**99**	**(United Kingdom) Aston Martin Racing V8**	**(Brazil) Fernando Rees (United Kingdom) Alex MacDowall (New Zealand) Richie Stanaway**	**Aston Martin 4.5 L V8**	MI	**151**	**+25 Laps**
17	LMGTE; Pro	92	(Germany) Porsche Team Manthey	(Austria) Richard Lietz (France) Frédéric Makowiecki	Porsche 911 RSR	MI	151	+25 Laps
17	LMGTE; Pro	92	(Germany) Porsche Team Manthey	(Austria) Richard Lietz (France) Frédéric Makowiecki	Porsche 4.0 L Flat-6	MI	151	+25 Laps
18	LMGTE; Pro	91	(Germany) Porsche Team Manthey	(France) Kévin Estre (Germany) Sven Müller	Porsche 911 RSR	MI	151	+25 Laps
18	LMGTE; Pro	91	(Germany) Porsche Team Manthey	(France) Kévin Estre (Germany) Sven Müller	Porsche 4.0 L Flat-6	MI	151	+25 Laps
19	LMGTE; Pro	51	(Italy) AF Corse	(Italy) Gianmaria Bruni (Finland) Toni Vilander	Ferrari 458 Italia GT2	MI	151	+25 Laps
19	LMGTE; Pro	51	(Italy) AF Corse	(Italy) Gianmaria Bruni (Finland) Toni Vilander	Ferrari 4.5 L V8	MI	151	+25 Laps
20	LMGTE; Pro	97	(United Kingdom) Aston Martin Racing	(United Kingdom) Darren Turner (Germany) Stefan Mücke (United Kingdom) Rob Bell	Aston Martin V8 Vantage GTE	MI	150	+26 Laps
20	LMGTE; Pro	97	(United Kingdom) Aston Martin Racing	(United Kingdom) Darren Turner (Germany) Stefan Mücke (United Kingdom) Rob Bell	Aston Martin 4.5 L V8	MI	150	+26 Laps
21	LMGTE; Pro	95	(United Kingdom) Aston Martin Racing	(Denmark) Christoffer Nygaard (Denmark) Marco Sørensen	Aston Martin V8 Vantage GTE	MI	150	+26 Laps
21	LMGTE; Pro	95	(United Kingdom) Aston Martin Racing	(Denmark) Christoffer Nygaard (Denmark) Marco Sørensen	Aston Martin 4.5 L V8	MI	150	+26 Laps
22	LMGTE; Pro	71	(Italy) AF Corse	(Italy) Davide Rigon (United Kingdom) James Calado	Ferrari 458 Italia GT2	MI	150	+26 Laps
22	LMGTE; Pro	71	(Italy) AF Corse	(Italy) Davide Rigon (United Kingdom) James Calado	Ferrari 4.5 L V8	MI	150	+26 Laps
23	LMP2	31	(United States) Extreme Speed Motorsports	(United States) Ed Brown (United States) Johannes van Overbeek (United States) Jon Fogarty	Ligier JS P2	D	149	+27 Laps
23	LMP2	31	(United States) Extreme Speed Motorsports	(United States) Ed Brown (United States) Johannes van Overbeek (United States) Jon Fogarty	Honda HR28TT 2.8 L Turbo V6	D	149	+27 Laps
24	**LMGTE; Am**	**98**	**(United Kingdom) Aston Martin Racing**	**(Canada) Paul Dalla Lana (Portugal) Pedro Lamy (Austria) Mathias Lauda**	**Aston Martin V8 Vantage GTE**	MI	**148**	**+28 Laps**
24	**LMGTE; Am**	**98**	**(United Kingdom) Aston Martin Racing**	**(Canada) Paul Dalla Lana (Portugal) Pedro Lamy (Austria) Mathias Lauda**	**Aston Martin 4.5 L V8**	MI	**148**	**+28 Laps**
25	LMGTE; Am	83	(Italy) AF Corse	(France) François Perrodo (France) Emmanuel Collard (Portugal) Rui Águas	Ferrari 458 Italia GT2	MI	148	+28 Laps
25	LMGTE; Am	83	(Italy) AF Corse	(France) François Perrodo (France) Emmanuel Collard (Portugal) Rui Águas	Ferrari 4.5 L V8	MI	148	+28 Laps
26	LMGTE; Am	72	(Russia) SMP Racing	(Russia) Viktor Shaytar (Russia) Aleksey Basov (Italy) Andrea Bertolini	Ferrari 458 Italia GT2	MI	147	+29 Laps
26	LMGTE; Am	72	(Russia) SMP Racing	(Russia) Viktor Shaytar (Russia) Aleksey Basov (Italy) Andrea Bertolini	Ferrari 4.5 L V8	MI	147	+29 Laps
27	LMGTE; Am	88	(Germany) Abu Dhabi-Proton Racing	(Germany) Christian Ried (Austria) Klaus Bachler (United Arab Emirates) Khaled Al Qubaisi	Porsche 911 RSR	MI	146	+30 Laps
27	LMGTE; Am	88	(Germany) Abu Dhabi-Proton Racing	(Germany) Christian Ried (Austria) Klaus Bachler (United Arab Emirates) Khaled Al Qubaisi	Porsche 4.0 L Flat-6	MI	146	+30 Laps
28	LMGTE; Am	77	(Germany) Dempsey Racing-Proton	(United States) Patrick Dempsey (United States) Patrick Long (Germany) Marco Seefried	Porsche 911 RSR	MI	145	+31 Laps
28	LMGTE; Am	77	(Germany) Dempsey Racing-Proton	(United States) Patrick Dempsey (United States) Patrick Long (Germany) Marco Seefried	Porsche 4.0 L Flat-6	MI	145	+31 Laps
29	LMGTE; Am	96	(United Kingdom) Aston Martin Racing	(Germany) Roald Goethe (United Kingdom) Stuart Hall (Italy) Francesco Castellacci	Aston Martin V8 Vantage GTE	MI	138	+38 Laps
29	LMGTE; Am	96	(United Kingdom) Aston Martin Racing	(Germany) Roald Goethe (United Kingdom) Stuart Hall (Italy) Francesco Castellacci	Aston Martin 4.5 L V8	MI	138	+38 Laps
30	LMP2	30	(United States) Extreme Speed Motorsports	(United States) Scott Sharp (United Kingdom) Ryan Dalziel (Denmark) David Heinemeier Hansson	Ligier JS P2	D	134	+42 Laps
30	LMP2	30	(United States) Extreme Speed Motorsports	(United States) Scott Sharp (United Kingdom) Ryan Dalziel (Denmark) David Heinemeier Hansson	Honda HR28TT 2.8 L Turbo V6	D	134	+42 Laps
31	LMP2	26	(Russia) G-Drive Racing	(Russia) Roman Rusinov (France) Julien Canal (United Kingdom) Sam Bird	Ligier JS P2	D	124	+52 Laps
31	LMP2	26	(Russia) G-Drive Racing	(Russia) Roman Rusinov (France) Julien Canal (United Kingdom) Sam Bird	Nissan VK45DE 4.5 L V8	D	124	+52 Laps
DNF	LMGTE; Am	55	(Italy) AF Corse	(United Kingdom) Duncan Cameron (United Kingdom) Alex Mortimer (Republic of Ireland) Matt Griffin	Ferrari 458 Italia GT2	MI	128	Retired
DNF	LMGTE; Am	55	(Italy) AF Corse	(United Kingdom) Duncan Cameron (United Kingdom) Alex Mortimer (Republic of Ireland) Matt Griffin	Ferrari 4.5 L V8	MI	128	Retired
DNF	LMGTE; Am	50	(France) Larbre Compétition	(Italy) Gianluca Roda (Italy) Paolo Ruberti (Denmark) Kristian Poulsen	Chevrolet Corvette C7.R	MI	61	Accident damage
DNF	LMGTE; Am	50	(France) Larbre Compétition	(Italy) Gianluca Roda (Italy) Paolo Ruberti (Denmark) Kristian Poulsen	Chevrolet 5.5 L V8	MI	61	Accident damage
DNF	LMP1	4	(Austria) Team ByKolles	(Switzerland) Simon Trummer (Italy) Vitantonio Liuzzi (Austria) Christian Klien	CLM P1/01	MI	46	Technical
DNF	LMP1	4	(Austria) Team ByKolles	(Switzerland) Simon Trummer (Italy) Vitantonio Liuzzi (Austria) Christian Klien	AER P60 Turbo V6	MI	46	Technical

Tyre manufacturers
Key
Symbol	Tyre manufacturer
**D**	Dunlop
**MI**	Michelin

== Standings after the race ==
World Endurance Drivers' Championship standings
Pos.	+/–	Driver	Points
1		(Germany) André Lotterer (Switzerland) Marcel Fässler (France) Benoît Tréluyer	50
2		(Germany) Marc Lieb (France) Romain Dumas (Switzerland) Neel Jani	36
3	1	(Austria) Alexander Wurz (United Kingdom) Mike Conway (France) Stéphane Sarrazin	22
4	1	(United Kingdom) Anthony Davidson (Switzerland) Sébastien Buemi	19
5	6	(Germany) Timo Bernhard (New Zealand) Brendon Hartley (Australia) Mark Webber	17

World Endurance Manufacturers' Championship standings
Pos.	+/–	Constructor	Points
1		(Germany) Audi	70
2	1	(Germany) Porsche	53
3	1	(Japan) Toyota	47

- Note: Only the top five positions are included for the Drivers' Championship standings.

FIA World Endurance Championship
Previous race: 6 Hours of Silverstone	2015 season	Next race: 24 Hours of Le Mans
