= Carrie Perrodo =

Hong Kong-born French billionaire

- 黃嘉兒
- Born: Ka Yee Wong; 1950 or 1951 (age 74–75); Hong Kong
- Occupation: Businesswoman
- Spouse: Hubert Perrodo (died 2006)
- Children: 3

Ka Yee "Carrie" Wong Perrodo (Chinese: 黃嘉兒; born 1950/51) is a Hong Kong-born French billionaire heiress and businesswoman. She is the owner of the oil group Perenco, which was founded by her late husband Hubert.

== Early life and career ==
Ka Yee "Carrie" Wong was born in Hong Kong and moved to Singapore to pursue a modelling career. Later she founded and sold a modeling agency, Carrie's Models, which is still active in Singapore.

== Personal life ==
In 1974, she married French businessman Hubert Perrodo (1944–2006), founder and sole owner of the Anglo-French oil and gas company Perenco. They had three children, François Hubert Marie Perrodo (born 14 February 1977), chairman of Perenco, Nathalie Perrodo-Samani (born 1980), and Bertrand Nicolas Hubert Perrodo (born 1984).

She lives in London, England.
