= Perenco =

French-British oil and gas company

- Type: Private
- Industry: Petroleum industry
- Founded: 1975
- Founder: Hubert Perrodo
- Headquarters: Paris, London
- Area served: Worldwide
- Key people: Armel Simondin, CEO; François Perrodo, Chairman
- Products: Oil and gas exploration and production, natural gas and LNG trading and transportation, oil refining
- Production output: 500,000 (2024)
- Revenue: 7,000,000,000 (2021)
- Number of employees: 6,000
- Subsidiaries: Dixstone
- Website: perenco.com

Perenco is an independent French-British oil and gas company with a headquarters in Paris and London. It conducts exploration and production activities in 16 countries around the globe (the North Sea, Cameroon, Gabon, Republic of Congo, Democratic Republic of Congo, Guatemala, Ecuador, Colombia, Peru, Venezuela, Brazil, Belize, Tunisia, Egypt, Turkey, Vietnam, Trinidad and Tobago). Perenco is involved in operations both onshore and offshore with production equal to approximately 450,000-barrel (72,000 m^{3}) of oil equivalent per day.

Perenco is owned by the French Perrodo family, whose fortune was estimated at around €8 billion in 2022.

== History ==
The company was established in 1975 by Hubert Perrodo as a marine services company based in Singapore. In 1980 the Group founded the Techfor drilling company and built a fleet of drilling rigs, jack-ups, swamp barges and land rigs. In 1982, the Group acquired the French drilling company Cosifor. In 1985, Perenco began its expansion into the upstream business, acquiring several proven onshore oil and gas fields in the United States, applying secondary-recovery techniques to enhance production. In 1992, it changed its profile to the oil exploration and production.

== Operations ==
Perenco operates in 16 countries and has over 6,000 employees. It is involved in operations both onshore and offshore with production equal to approximately 500,000 barrels per day (79,000 m^{3}/d). While Perenco's growth has been driven by acquisitions, the Group's strategy evolved rapidly towards increasing production and reserves, renewing licenses and securing additional acreage for new exploration and development opportunities.

=== Regions ===
==== Africa ====
Perenco operates in 5 countries on the African continent. In March 2023, Perenco became the subject of several preliminary investigations regarding corruption of public officials in African countries. These investigations began at the same time as investigations of Perenco in France.

===== Cameroon =====
Perenco has operated in Cameroon since 1993, as a partner with ExxonMobil and SNH, Cameroon's state-owned hydrocarbon company. In 2018, Perenco began production at Cameroon LNG on the floating LNG unit Hilli Episeyo.

===== Congo =====
Perenco operates four offshore fields in the Republic of Congo: Emeraude Field (2001), Yombo Field (2002), Likouala Field (2010) and PNGF-Sud Fields (2017).

===== Democratic Republic of Congo (DRC) =====
Since Perenco's arrival in the region in 2000, production has increased significantly through continual investment in new production wells (about 30 per year). The company's technical expertise (such as modifications to the pumping systems) focused on completing the primary recovery process and starting the secondary and tertiary recovery processes. Perenco is the DRC's sole oil producer and is the largest investor and taxpayer in the country.

===== Gabon =====
Perenco began operations in Gabon in 1992 with the acquisition of four offshore fields south of Port-Gentil. The production is 65,000 barrels per day (10,300 m^{3}/d) through 29 offshore and onshore licences. One half of Perenco's crude oil production in Gabon is sent to the Fernan Vaz and Mayumba Floating Storage and Offloading units, with storage capacities of 2,000,000 barrels (320,000 m^{3}) and 500,000 barrels (79,000 m^{3}), respectively.

Since December 18, 2007, Perenco has supplied gas to the power plants of Libreville and Port-Gentil. This partnership is the result of a project enabling Perenco to provide up to 680,000m3 of gas per day (450,000m3 to Libreville-Owendo and 230,000m3 to Port-Gentil).

In 2017, Perenco made a deal with Total Gabon, taking operatorship of several licences that were previously produced by Total only.

In 2018, Perenco entered talks to purchase Sardine from Forafric Energy.

===== Tunisia =====
Perenco's Tunisian assets were acquired in July 2002. Perenco owns 50% and operates the on-stream El Franig, Baguel, and Tarfa gas condensate fields in central Tunisia.

Production from the El Franig and Baguel fields is transported to the central processing facility in Oum-Chiah via 120 km of pipeline. Condensate is transferred to the La Skhira terminal for export, and gas is delivered to the Gabes plant for domestic consumption.

Perenco is actively exploring the Takrouna permit, and a 400 km 2D seismic programme has already been acquired. Evaluation of relevant data will determine a location for an exploration well.

==== Asia ====
===== Vietnam =====
Perenco has participating interests in 3 Vietnamese companies, 23.25% in Block 15-1, 36% in Block 15-2, and 16.33% in the Nam Con Son pipeline. Perenco’s Vietnamese holdings were acquired from ConocoPhillips in 2012 for a reported $1.29 billion. In 2018, both companies filed a suit in Vietnam to attempt to stop the Vietnamese government from taxing the sale, noting that the sale was between two UK-based companies and therefore not subject to capital gains tax.

==== Australia ====
Perenco holds a 60% interest in, and operates, exploration permit T/32P and holds a 37,5% interest in T/35P operated by Santos in partnership with Mitsui. These permits are located in the offshore Sorell Basin in South-East Australia, which is an extension of the producing Otway Basin. They have a combined area of over 13,000 square kilometres (5,000 sq mi). They offer a range of play types, prospects and leads, some of which are analogous to the Thylacine and Geographe fields in the Otway basin.

Perenco also holds a 33% interest in AC/P45 and 40% in AC/P44 in the Browse Basin of the NW shelf with the remainder held by Finder Exploration, who retain operatorship. AC/P44 and AC/P45 have a combined area of 5,000 square kilometres (1,900 sq mi).

==== North America ====
===== Mexico =====
In August 2018, Perenco reached an agreement to acquire 49% of Petrofac Limited in Mexico.

==== Central America ====
===== Belize =====
Perenco holds a 100% interest in Block A, located in the north of Belize. The Block A exploration permit was signed with the Belizean Authorities in January 2008. The permit is located in the Corozal Basin, an extension of the producing North Peten Basin in Guatemala, and to the north of the Spanish Lookout and Never Delay fields. The permit covers an area of 2,388 square kilometres (922 sq mi).

====== Land invasion scandal ======
In 2020, Perenco faced allegations that it used local authorities to repress the communities of Tabasco and landowners who refused to accept the contracts it had imposed. The owners of the land reported the allegations to the National Human Rights Commission (Mexico) and the Government of Mexico.

==== Caribbean ====
===== Trinidad and Tobago =====
In December 2016, Perenco acquired the Teak, Samaan and Poui (TSP) fields offshore the south-east coast of Trinidad from Repsol. Perenco is the operator and holds 70% interest in the assets with state owned Heritage and NGC holding the remaining 30%. TSP produces more than 10,000 bopd from Plio-Pleistocene sandstone reservoirs. Perenco is the largest foreign oil producer operating in Trinidad and Tobago.

==== Europe ====
In 2022, Investigate Europe and Disclose published a series of articles with the support of the Environmental Investigative Forum (EIF) about Perenco "including alleged pollution, structures in tax havens and political ties."

===== United Kingdom =====
Perenco operates five compression hubs/gas gathering platforms with their connecting pipelines to the Bacton Gas Terminal on the Norfolk coast.

- East Leman (Block 49/27)
- Inde - (Block 49/23)
- Trent - (Block 44/24)
- Lancelot - (Block 48/17)
- Thames (Block 49/28)

In 2011 it acquired the onshore Wytch Farm oilfield from BP, as part of a shared venture, while maintaining full operatorship.

In 2012 it acquired all offshore Southern North Sea BP gas assets, previously called "SGA". The asset transfer included an office in Hessle and the Dimlington gas terminal.

In 2024, the Guardian revealed that Perenco repeatedly missed by many years agreed official deadlines to decommission ageing North Sea oil wells at a cost of up to £8m each, creating major fire and environmental risks.

==== Middle East ====
===== Turkey =====
In January 1996, Perenco took over oil fields in the vicinity of Diyarbakir, South East Turkey. With daily production at 10,000 bbl/d (1,600 m^{3}/d) (net share), the largest foreign oil producer operating in the country. Perenco operates approximately 200 wells and seven production gathering stations within a 100 km long zone. Perenco's export facility is located at the Pirinclik terminal, which exports crude oil to Mediterranean seaports.

==== South America ====
===== Brazil =====
Perenco was awarded five deep water exploration licenses in the Brazilian 9th round of licensing, with concession agreements signed in March 2008. The exploration blocks are all operated by Perenco and are held in partnership with OGX. The blocks are contiguous and located in the offshore Espirito Santo basin.

===== Colombia =====
Perenco operates six association contracts and one concession contract under its subsidiary Perenco Colombia Ltd, founded in 1993 and based in Bogota.

===== Ecuador =====
In July 2009, the Government of Ecuador took over a day-to-day operations Perenco's fields in Ecuador. Perenco has announced it would file a claim with the International Centre for Settlement of Investment Disputes.

===== Guatemala =====
Perenco has operated in Guatemala since 2001, when it acquired Basic Resources International Ltd. of the Bahamas from Anadarko Petroleum. Anadarko had acquired Basic, which operated oilfields that produced about 20,000 bbl/d in the Rubelsanto and the Xan regions in northern Guatemala, when it purchased Union Pacific Resources Co. in 2000 (Perenco Group, 2001). Its principal assets in the country comprise Xan Field, La Libertad refinery, and 475 kilometres (295 mi) pipeline with six pumping stations connecting Xan and Rubelsanto fields to the Piedras Negras Terminal on Guatemala's Atlantic coast. The facility has a storage capacity of 430 thousand barrels (68×10^{3} m^{3}), dispatching an average of 12 vessels per year.

===== Peru =====
Perenco holds a 100% interest in the licence contract for Block 67 in the Maranon Basin. Block 67 comprises Paiche, Dorado and Pirana fields. Once development is completed, it is estimated that these fields will have the potential to produce up to 100,000 barrels per day (16,000 m^{3}/d) of oil. The development plan includes the drilling of over 170 wells from 10 platforms and construction of central processing facilities and local pipelines for delivery of crude oil into the export pipeline system. This system will transport production to Bayovar export terminal, located 1000 km from Block 67 on the Pacific coast. In April 2009, the development of Block 67 was declared as a project of national necessity and interest. Around the same time, Perenco’s presence in the region was opposed by indigenous organisations in Peru which filed lawsuits against the company.

===== Venezuela =====
Perenco holds interests in two public-private partnerships, Petrowarao and Baripetrol. Petrowarao operates Pedernales and Ambrosio. Baripetrol operates Colon.

The Pedernales Field is located on the northern margin of the Orinoco Delta. The surrounding environment is a combination of tidal channels and mangrove, with water depth between 3m and 10m. The installation comprises floating and fixed platforms with 26 active wells. It produces 5,000 barrels (790 cubic metres) per day. The Ambrosio Field in Lake Maracaibo produces 3,000 bbl (480 m^{3}) per day of oil equivalent.

In February 2014, Perenco and the Venezuelan state oil firm PDVSA entered into talks for a $600 million financing deal to boost production at their Petrowarao joint venture.

=== Environmental impact ===
In 2022, the company was awarded a licence to conduct an offshore carbon capture and storage (CCS) project as part of a joint venture with CCS company Carbon Catalyst at Perenco's Leman gas field. It will function by injecting carbon dioxide into depleted undersea gas reservoirs and saline aquifers. Further licenses were awarded for projects relating to the decommissioned Amethyst gas field and the currently producing West Sole field operated by Perenco, both east of the Yorkshire Coast.

In April 2023 an oil spill occurred in Poole Harbour, a Site of Special Scientific Interest, at Perenco's Wytch Farm facility. Perenco stated that 200 barrels of "reservoir fluid" had been discharged into Poole Harbour, affecting wildlife in the area. Water users and seafarers (such as fishermen) were told not to use the harbour, whilst swimmers and beach-goers were warned against entering the water. The Environment Agency (EA) declared a major incident had occurred while Perenco faced criticism from climate activists, local politicians and the interim leader of the BCP Council. Through water samples, the EA determined that the spill was contained to the area closest to Shotover Moor and did not significantly impact the rest of the harbour.

In 2023, a global investigative series led by the Environmental Investigative Forum (EIF) in partnership with Mediapart, InfoAmazonia, InfoCongo, Convoca, Republica, Inkyfada and Cameroon Times was published, alleging established systemic environmental abuses by Perenco. According to the journalism consortium, the group operates in 74 protected areas across the globe and is responsible for over 400 cases of air and water pollution as of December 2023.

== Former operations ==
=== Iraq ===
Perenco's subsidiary office in Erbil was closed in mid-2013 and there is no longer exploration and/or activities ongoing in Northern Iraq Kurdistan. Perenco owned Sindi-Amedi Exploration License from 2007 to 2013 which is located in the Kurdistan Autonomous Region of Northern Iraq. The license area was 2,358 km^{2} and was located adjacent to the Silopi licenses in Turkey, in which Perenco is a partner. The license is also adjacent to the Tawke field.
