= Château Marquis d'Alesme Becker =

Winery in the Bordeaux wine of France

Coordinates: 45.04194°N 0.67702°W

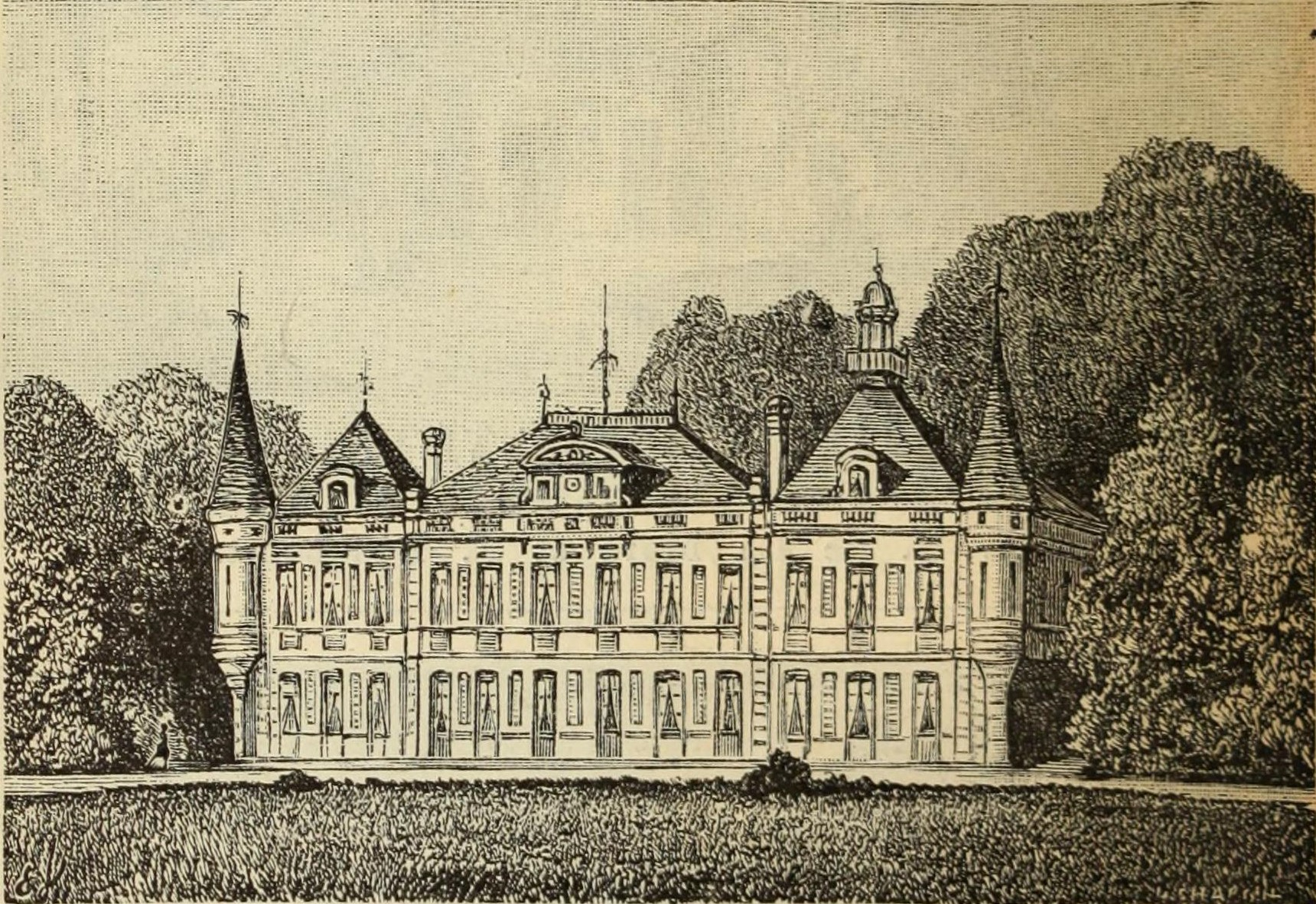
Château Marquis d'Alesme Becker, former mansion of maître du Château Desmirail.

Château Marquis d'Alesme Becker is a winery in the Margaux appellation of the Bordeaux wine region of France. The wine produced here was classified as one of fourteen Troisièmes Crus (Third Growths) in the historic Bordeaux Wine Official Classification of 1855.

The estate produces a second wine named Marquise d'Alesme.

== History ==
Established by the Marquis d'Alesme in 1585, the estate was originally planted in 1616. The property was acquired in 1809 by the Dutch businessman Jan Bekker Teerlink (1759–1832), commonly referred to as ‘Monsieur Becker’ (the misspelled first part of his double-barrelled family name), who attached his name to that of the estate, and for a period the wine was called simply "Becker" in Bordeaux.

In the early 20th Century, the property was bought by Comte Jean-Jules Théophile Chaix-d'Est-Ange, who had also inherited neighbouring Château Lascombes from his father, who intended to combine the two estates, but died in 1923 before carrying out the plan. The original Marquis d'Alesme château became offices for Lascombes, with the original château of Desmirail taking its place.

The estate saw a succession of owners, including English firm WH Chaplin & Co and the Zuger family, until it was sold in 2006 to petrochemical industry businessman Hubert Perrodo . Apparently with elaborate plans of combining several of his Margaux estates, no changes took place after Perrodo was killed in a skiing accident in late 2006. The estate is currently run by Nathalie Perrodo.

== Production ==
The vineyard area consists of 16 hectares (40 acres) of vines, currently planted with 30% Cabernet Sauvignon, 45% Merlot, 15% Cabernet Franc and 10% Petit Verdot, an unusual composition of grape varieties for Margaux or the Médoc.

Approximately 8000 cases of the Grand vin is produced per year, and 1000 cases of the second wine, Marquise d'Alesme.
