= Hubert Perrodo =

French businessman (1944–2006)

- Born: 25 January 1944; Larmor-Baden, Morbihan, France
- Died: 29 December 2006 (aged 62); Courchevel, France
- Occupation: Businessman
- Known for: Founder and sole owner of the oil group Perenco
- Spouse: Carrie Perrodo
- Children: 3, including François Perrodo

Hubert Perrodo (25 January 1944 - 29 December 2006) was a French businessman, polo player and art collector. He was the founder and sole owner of the oil group Perenco.

== Early life ==
Hubert Perrodo was born on 25 January 1944 in Larmor-Baden in Morbihan, Brittany, to a family of fishermen.

== Career ==
He was the president of the independent oil group Perenco, which produced then more than 240,000 barrels (38,000 m^{3}) of oil per day.

== Polo ==
His polo team, Labégorce, won the Queen's Cup, in 2004. On a journey to Château Giscours, in Margaux to play polo, he learned that Château Labégorce Zédé was for sale. He bought it in August 1989 and went on to become a large wine producer. In 2001, he repurchased the Castle of Abbot Gorsse de Gorsse, in February 2002 bought Labégorce-Zédé Castle, and in June 2006 he bought the Château Marquis d'Alesme Becker.

== Art collection ==
He was a prominent art collector, mostly focused on paintings.

== Later life ==
He died on 29 December 2006 — one month before his 63rd birthday — in a ski touring accident, descending La Dent du Villard near Courchevel.

== Personal life ==
He was married to Ka Yee Wong, later known as Carrie Perrodo. They had three children, François Hubert Marie Perrodo (born 14 February 1977), chairman of Perenco, Nathalie Perrodo-Samani (born 1980) and Bertrand Nicolas Hubert Perrodo (born 1984).

In 2026, he ranks 16th among France's wealthiest people.
