= Jan Bekker Teerlink =

Jan Bekker Teerlink (baptized 17 August 1759 – 4 December 1832) was a Dutch plant and seed collector and winemaker.

== Origin ==
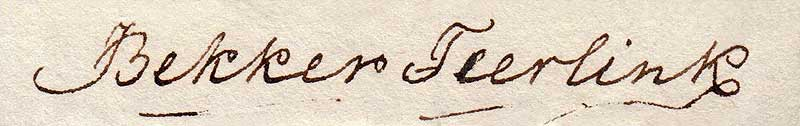
Signature of Jan Bekker Teerlink on a 1791 dated letter from Kanton.

He was born in Vlissingen as son of pharmacist Joris Teerlink and Christina Bekker. As his mother was a sister of the 18th century Dutch writer Elisabeth (Betje) Wolff-Bekker (1738–1804), he could call one of the celebrities of Dutch literature his aunt. Jan Bekker Teerlink was named, both for his first and double-barrelled last name, after his maternal grandfather, the broker of spices and herbs, Jan Bekker sr. (1695–1783), Betje Wolff's father. Towards the end of her life, Betje Wolff says in one of her letters that she dearly loves her nephew, whom she considers a thoroughly decent person. At his departure for another long sea voyage, she wept with grief. Apart from proper, his documents at National Archives show us Bekker Teerlink also as an agreeable person, a man who played the violin aboard his ship.

A letter written by Teerlink in the early nineties and sent from the Guangzhou (Kanton) office in China was sealed with a red wax seal depicting a coat of arms divided into quarters; two-quarters with a chevron with a number of five-pointed stars and clover leaves and a garland of roses, both referring to Jan and Betje's mutual ancestors, the Bekkers. It turns out, that the probably unknown coat of arms belonging to the Bekker family, is also depicted on the copper engraving with the coat of arms of the Zeeland 'edele en aensienelijke geslachten' (= noble and patrician families) in the Nieuwe Cronyk van Zeeland (1700) by historian and genealogist Mattheus Smallegange.

Jan's sister, Johanna Laurentia Teerlink ('Jansje Teerling'), was Betje's foster child who frequently appears in the letters of the writer and her companion author Agatha (Aagje) Deken. In the eighties, the girl lived on a small estate called Lommerlust at the village of Beverwijk near Haarlem, with her aunt Betje and Aagje Deken. Jansje and her husband were the ones who took care of the writers on their return to Holland after nine years of exile in France, a consequence of their patriotic sympathies during the period of conflict between the Dutch Patriots and Orangists. Jansje was present when Betje, after a long period of illness, in 1804 died at The Hague.

== Botanical interest ==
The writer, Betje Wolff-Bekker, who spent much of her youth at the luxurious 'allotment' in the Flushing seignory Oud-Vlissingen, continued to spend substantial parts of her life in gardens, even while in exile in Burgundy. Obvious from letters and publications written by Betje, ‘dichtres der schoone natuur’ (= poetess of the beautiful nature), is her early interest in nature and garden design. As a pharmacist's son, nephew Jan Bekker Teerlink certainly must have been familiar with the botany subject. Probably it was this knowledge that made him visit the Company's Garden in Cape Town to collect a quantity of seeds there.

== Winery ==
From 1809 he owned the winery Château Marquis d'Alesme Becker in the Margaux appellation of the Bordeaux wine region of France. Bekker Teerlink's winery, which was established by the Marquis d'Alesme in 1585, still exists. The wine with his family name Château Marquis d'Alesme 'Becker' – and for a period simply called Becker – has been in production ever since. Jan Bekker Teerlink ('Monsieur Becker') died on 4 December 1832 at Margaux and was buried at the Bordeaux Protestant Cemetery.

== British hothouse ==
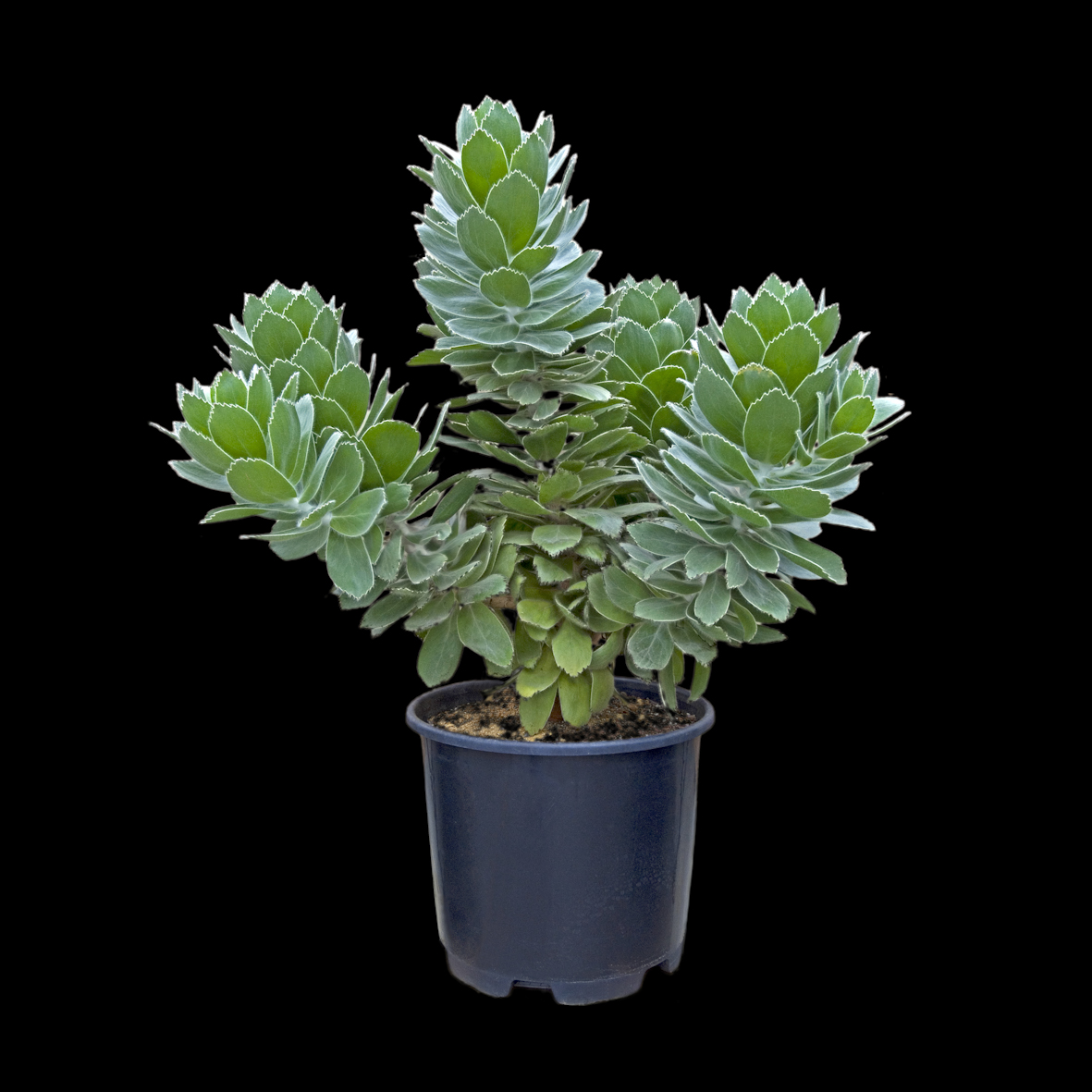
A Leucospermum plant grown in Kew Gardens from seeds collected by Bekker Teerlink.

In September 2006, the Dutch newspaper NRC Handelsblad as well as other national and international media made mention of a more than two hundred years old African seed granule, which had been kept all that time in British archive depositories, currently at The National Archives. In one of the Royal Botanic Gardens greenhouses at Wakehurst Place in West Sussex, the brown seed, which had been taken from the pod of a yet unknown acacia species was, due to the utmost care, awoken from its long slumber. From a scientific point of view, the germination is an important occurrence, as it allows us to precisely determine the age of the seed. It is also possible for experts to as follow the process, from planting to genesis.

== Preserved possessions ==
The seed of the unknown acacia species and seeds of more than 30 other underspecies of plant families from the company's Garden in Cape Town, were enclosed in paper wrappers inside a red leather portefeuille and accompanied by a ship's journal and other documents. Executed in gold on the portefeuille is the name and place of residence of its owner, the chief merchant in the service of the Asian Council – the successor of the Dutch East India Company – Jan Bekker Teerlink. The objects were part of the booty that were stolen in 1803 from the Dutch trading vessel 'Henriette' by British naval privateers authorized by their government during the Batavian Period (1795–1806) to engage in such practices.
