= François Perrodo =

French billionaire, businessman, racing driver and car collector

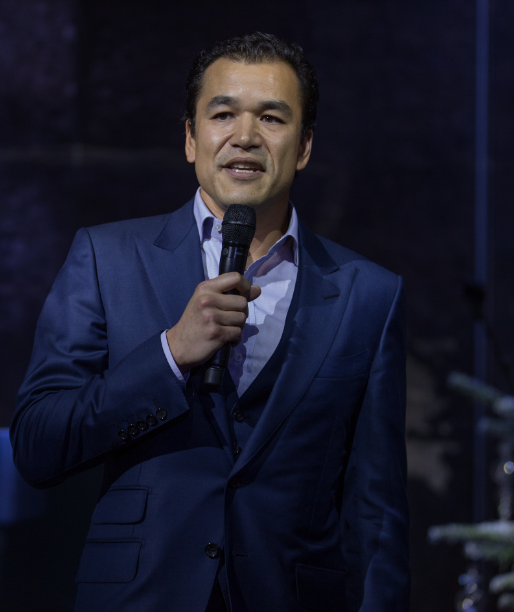
- Perrodo in 2017
- Born: François Hubert Marie Perrodo; 14 February 1977 (age 49); Singapore
- Citizenship: French
- Education: St Peter's College, Oxford; IFP School; INSEAD
- Occupations: Businessman; Racing driver
- Categorisation: FIA Bronze
- Known for: Chairman, Perenco
- Parent(s): Hubert Perrodo; Carrie Perrodo

François Hubert Marie Perrodo (born 14 February 1977) is a French billionaire businessman, racing driver, and car collector. He is the chairman of Perenco, an oil and gas company with operations in 14 countries, which was founded by his father. In October 2023, Forbes estimated his family to be worth US$10 billion.

== Biography ==
=== Origin ===
François Perrodo was born on 14 February 1977 in Singapore. He is the son of Carrie and Hubert Perrodo, French businessman and founder of the oil group Perenco.

=== Education ===
Perrodo has a degree in physics from St Peter's College, Oxford, where he captained the University polo team in 1999. He is now a member of Guards Polo Club.

After an engineering degree in 2002 from the École Nationale Supérieure du Pétrole et des Moteurs (ENSPM) now called IFP School (French Institute of Petroleum), Perrodo received an MBA from INSEAD in Singapore.

== Business ==
Perrodo is the president of the Franco-British Perenco, an oil and gas corporation specialized in secondary recovery from wells the major oil companies have ceased to exploit. He has acquired significant real estate using shell companies in offshore tax havens.

=== Diversification ===
As of January 2025, the Perrodo family is diversifying its investments into luxury real estate, diamonds, and clothing. This shift aims to reduce reliance on hydrocarbons and explore new asset classes. Recent filings reveal their acquisitions include a $21 million office and apartment block in New York's SoHo and upscale properties in Spain, alongside ventures in packaged Italian food.

Francois Perrodo, the family's chairman, leads these investments through their London-based family office BNF Capital and private equity firm Perwyn Advisors. The family is also involved in battery metals, uranium, and vineyards.

== Car collection ==
Perrodo maintains a large collection of historically significant automobiles and is one of the most prolific French car collectors. He keeps cars in both France and the United Kingdom. Perrodo shares photos and stories of his cars and his racing career on his Instagram account.

The collection includes:

- McLaren F1 #069
- McLaren F1 GTR 4R
- McLaren F1 LM
- McLaren F1 GTR 5R
- Ferrari 250 GT/L Berlinetta
- Ferrari 250 GTO s/n 3387 (purchased in 2016 for $56.4 million)
- Ferrari 250 SWB Competizione
- Ferrari 250 SWB Berlinetta
- Ferrari 250 GT SWB California Spyder (Grey)
- Ferrari 250 GT SWB California Spyder (Black)
- Ferrari 275 GTB/2
- Ferrari 275 GTB/C
- Ferrari 333 SP
- Ferrari 288 GTO
- Ferrari F40
- Ferrari F40
- Ferrari F50
- Ferrari 550 Barchetta Pininfarina
- Ferrari LaFerrari
- Ferrari 812 Competizione Aperta
- Ferrari Monza SP2
- Ferrari Daytona SP3
- Ferrari 550 Maranello GTS
- Ferrari 365 GTS/4
- Bugatti EB110 Super Sport
- Bugatti Veyron 16.4 Grand Sport Vitesse
- Bugatti Chiron Pur Sport
- Bugatti Centodieci
- Porsche 910
- Porsche 917K
- Porsche 911 GT1 Evo
- Porsche 911 GT2 993 (Red)
- Porsche 911 GT2 993 (Yellow)
- Porsche 911 GT2 993 (Blue)
- Porsche 911 GT3 RS 4.0 997 (White)
- Porsche 911 GT3 RS 4.0 997 (Black)
- Porsche Carrera GT
- Porsche RS Spyder Evo
- Porsche RS Spyder Evo
- Maserati MC12
- Maserati MC12 (Blue Carbon Fibre)
- Maserati MC12 GT1
- Aston Martin DBR9
- Alpine A110 (2017)
- Lancia Delta Integrale
- 2008 McLaren MP4-23A Formula 1 car driven by Lewis Hamilton, winning Australian and Monaco GP.
- Lamborghini Diablo SE
- Toyota TS020 LM907, the only TS020 in private hands

The collection used to include the following, which have since been sold:

- McLaren F1 #045
- McLaren P1
- McLaren Senna
- McLaren 675LT
- Porsche 918 Spyder
- Lamborghini Huracán Performante
- Mercedes-Benz AMG SLS Black Series
- Lexus LFA
- Ford GT (2017)

== Racing driver ==
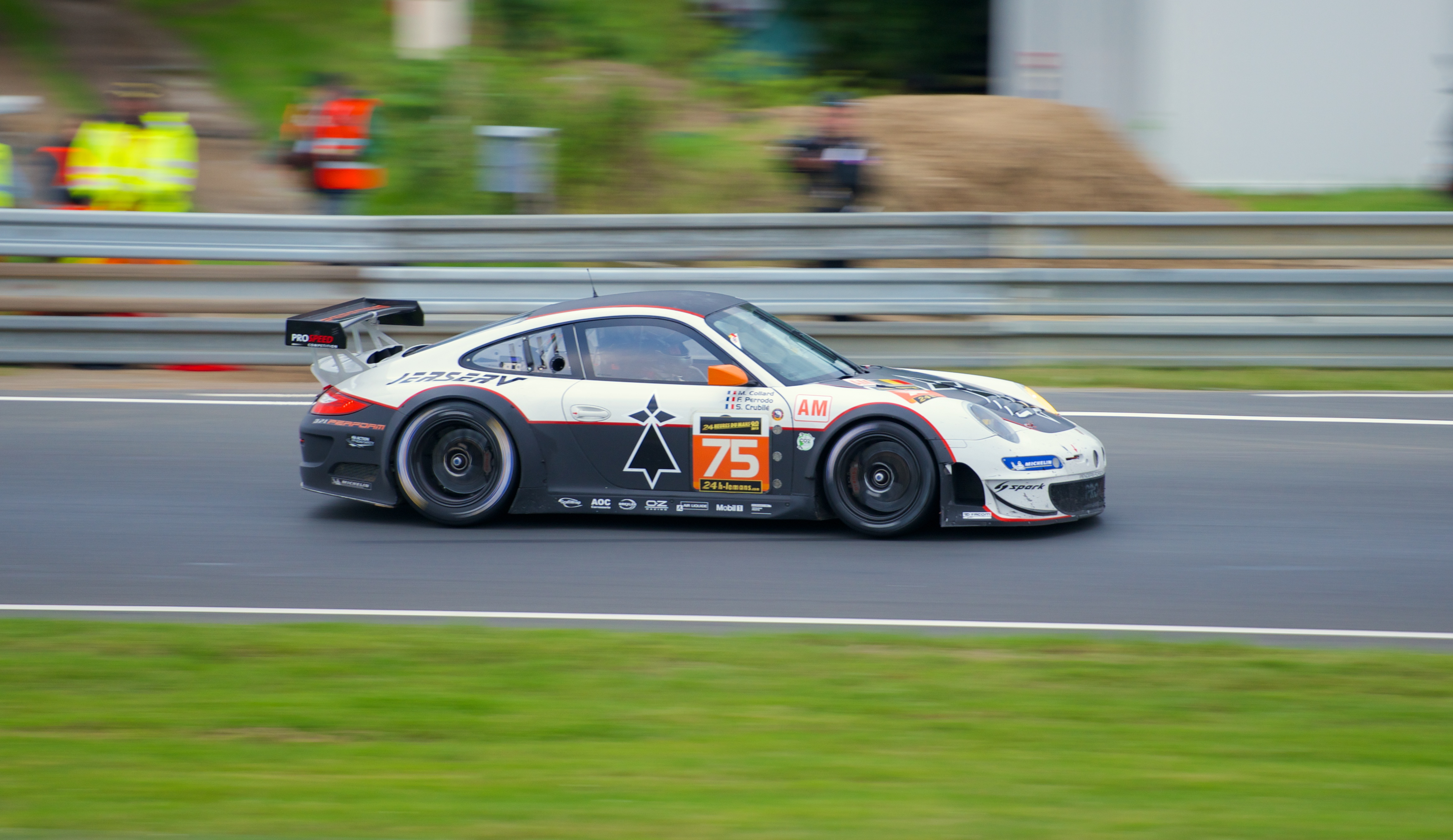
Porsche 997 GT3-RSR

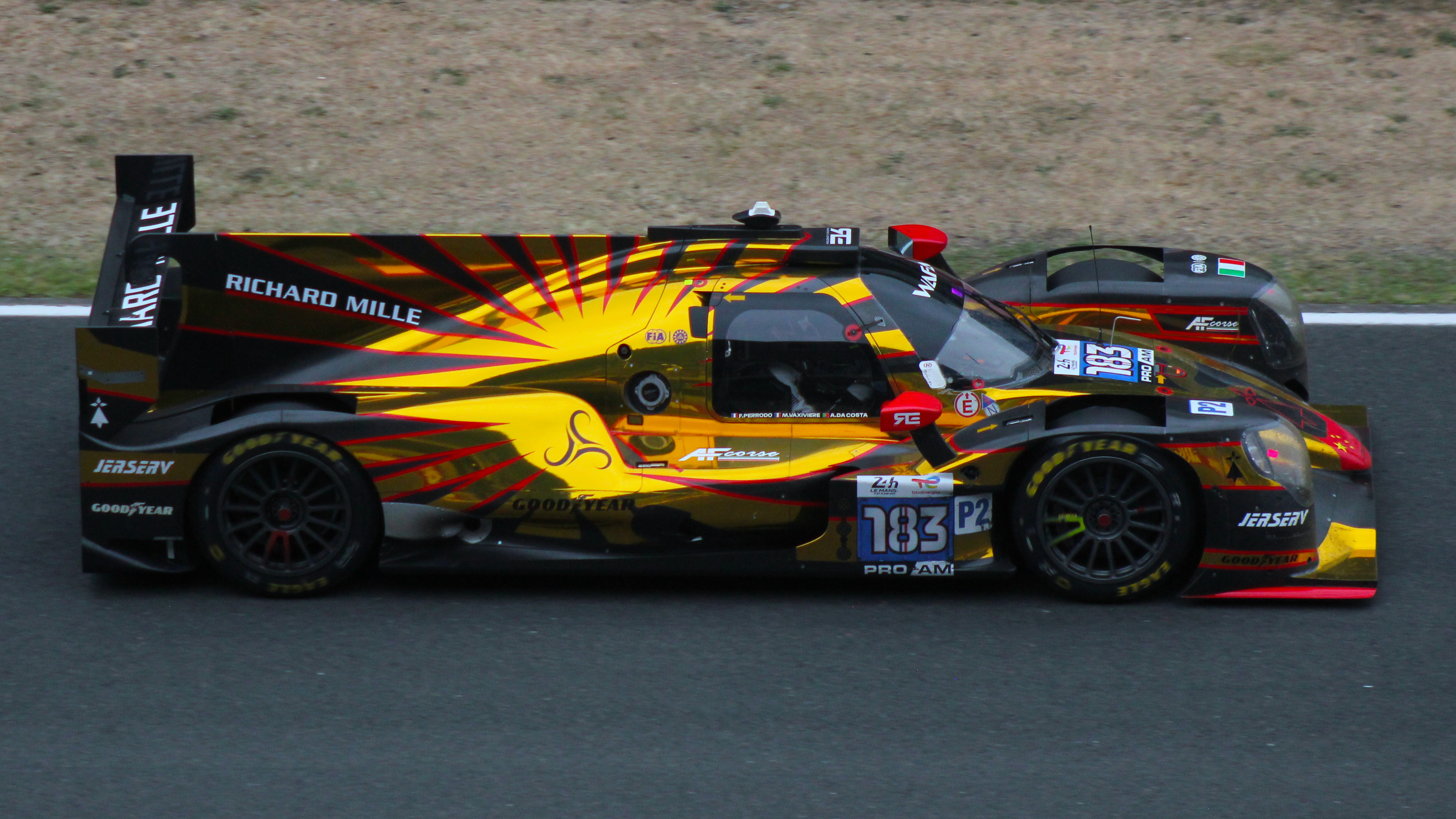
Perrodo's No. 183 car at the 2025 24 Hours of Le Mans

Perrodo is a motorsport enthusiast, having started racing classic cars in 2010. He is currently competing in the LMP2 Pro-Am class in the European Le Mans Series for AF Corse.

Perrodo has competed in the FIA World Endurance Championship, driving for AF Corse in the LMP2 class until 2022, having initially competed in the GTE Am class from 2013 until 2016. He has taken part in the 24 Hours of Le Mans, V de V Series, Blancpain GT Series Endurance Cup, IMSA SportsCar Championship and the 24H Series.

Perrodo was involved in a controversial incident when driving AF Corse's No. 83 LMP2 entry in the 2022 24 Hours of Le Mans. While running side-by-side with the GTE-Pro class leading No. 64 Corvette of Alexander Sims in the final hours of the race, Perrodo swerved sharply left and sent the Corvette crashing into the barriers in the middle of the Mulsanne Straight. AF Corse's No. 51 GTE-Pro entry was running second in class at the time and went on to inherit the class lead from the Corvette.

=== Complete European Le Mans Series results ===
(key) (Races in bold indicate pole position; races in italics indicate fastest lap)

Year	Entrant	Class	Car	Engine	1	2	3	4	5	6	Pos.	Pts
2013	Prospeed Competition	LMGTE	Porsche 997 GT3-RSR	Porsche M97/74 4.0 L Flat-6	SIL; 5	IMO; Ret	RBR; 5	HUN; 4	LEC; 6		8th	40
2014	Crubilé Sport	LMGTE	Porsche 997 GT3-RSR	Porsche M97/74 4.0 L Flat-6	SIL; 8	IMO; 10					20th	13
2014	AF Corse	LMGTE	Ferrari 458 Italia GT2	Ferrari F136 4.5 L V8			RBR; 8	LEC; Ret	EST; 8		20th	13
2018	TDS Racing	LMP2	Oreca 07	Gibson GK428 4.2 L V8	LEC; 2	MNZ; 2	RBR; 9	SIL	SPA	ALG	10th	38
2020	AF Corse	LMGTE	Ferrari 488 GTE Evo	Ferrari F154CB 3.9 L Turbo V8	LEC	SPA; 2	LEC	MNZ	ALG; 8		NC	0
2021	AF Corse	LMGTE	Ferrari 488 GTE Evo	Ferrari F154CB 3.9 L Turbo V8	CAT; WD	**RBR**; 1	LEC; 3	MNZ; 3	SPA; 1	ALG; 10	3rd	83
2022	AF Corse	LMP2	Oreca 07	Gibson GK428 4.2 L V8	LEC; 8	**IMO**; 14	MNZ; 12	CAT; 5	SPA; 7	ALG; 8	12th	25
2022	AF Corse	Pro-Am Cup	Oreca 07	Gibson GK428 4.2 L V8	2	5	4	1	2	2	3rd	101
2023	AF Corse	LMP2 Pro-Am	Oreca 07	Gibson GK428 4.2 L V8	CAT; 2	LEC; 3	ARA; 1	SPA; 4	ALG; 3	POR; 1	1st	110
2024	AF Corse	LMP2 Pro-Am	Oreca 07	Gibson GK428 4.2 L V8	CAT; 1	LEC; 4	IMO; 2	SPA; 1	MUG; 7	ALG; 4	1st	98
2025	AF Corse	LMP2 Pro-Am	Oreca 07	Gibson GK428 4.2 L V8	CAT; 1	LEC; 8	IMO; 5	SPA; 4	SIL; 3	ALG; 6	4th	74
2026	AF Corse	LMP2 Pro-Am	Oreca 07	Gibson GK428 4.2 L V8	CAT; 2	LEC; 6	IMO; 5	SPA; 1	SIL; 7	ALG	1st*	67*

=== Complete FIA World Endurance Championship results ===
Year	Entrant	Class	Car	Engine	1	2	3	4	5	6	7	8	9	Rank	Points
2013	Prospeed Competition	LMGTE Am	Porsche 997 GT3-RSR	Porsche M97/74 4.0 L Flat-6	SIL	SPA	LMS; 9	SÃO	COA	FUJ	SHA			22nd	15
2013	AF Corse	LMGTE Am	Ferrari 458 Italia GT2	Ferrari F136 4.5 L V8								BHR; 3		22nd	15
2014	Prospeed Competition	LMGTE Am	Porsche 997 GT3-RSR	Porsche M97/74 4.0 L Flat-6	SIL; Ret	SPA; 6	LMS; Ret							9th	58
2014	Prospeed Competition	LMGTE Am	Porsche 911 RSR	Porsche M97/80 4.0 L Flat-6				**AUS**; 8	FUJ; 3	SHA; 4	BHR; 7	SÃO; 5		9th	58
2015	AF Corse	LMGTE Am	Ferrari 458 Italia GT2	Ferrari F136 4.5 L V8	SIL; 2	SPA; 2	LMS; 3	NÜR; 3	AUS; 3	FUJ; 3	SHA; 1	BHR; 4		2nd	148
2016	AF Corse	LMGTE Am	Ferrari 458 Italia GT2	Ferrari F136 4.5 L V8	SIL; 1	SPA; 2	LMS; 1	NÜR; 2	MEX; 2	AUS; 6	FUJ; 2	SHA; 2	BHR; 3	1st	188
2017	TDS Racing	LMP2	Oreca 07	Gibson GK428 4.2 L V8	SIL; 3	SPA; 9	LMS; Ret	NÜR; 8	MEX; 7	AUS; 7	FUJ; 4	SHA; 6	BHR; 9	14th	55
2018–19	TDS Racing	LMP2	Oreca 07	Gibson GK428 4.2 L V8	SPA; 4	LMS; DSQ	SIL; 7	FUJ; 4	SHA; Ret	SEB; NC	SPA; 4	LMS; 3		8th	66
2019-20	AF Corse	LMGTE Am	Ferrari 488 GTE Evo	Ferrari F154CB 3.9 L Turbo V8	SIL; 1	FUJ; 2	SHA; 4	BHR; 4	AUS; 4	SPA; 1	LMS; 3	BHR; 2		1st	167
2021	AF Corse	LMGTE Am	Ferrari 488 GTE Evo	Ferrari F154CB 3.9 L Turbo V8	SPA; 1	POR; 11	MON; 1	LMS; 1	BHR; 5	BHR; 1				1st	150
2022	AF Corse	LMP2	Oreca 07	Gibson GK428 4.2 L V8	**SEB**; 9	**SPA**; 9	LMS; 11	MNZ; 9	FUJ; 10	BHR; 10				18th	12
2022	AF Corse	Pro-Am Cup	Oreca 07	Gibson GK428 4.2 L V8	1	1	2	3	1	1				1st	177

=== Complete 24 Hours of Le Mans results ===
Year	Team	Co-Drivers	Car	Class	Laps	Pos.	Class Pos.
2013	(Belgium) Prospeed Competition	(France) Emmanuel Collard (France) Sébastien Crubilé	Porsche 997 GT3-RSR	GTE; Am	298	36th	9th
2014	(Belgium) Prospeed Competition	(France) Emmanuel Collard (Finland) Markus Palttala	Porsche 997 GT3-RSR	GTE; Am	194	DNF	DNF
2015	(Italy) AF Corse	(Portugal) Rui Águas (France) Emmanuel Collard	Ferrari 458 Italia GT2	GTE; Am	330	26th	4th
2016	(Italy) AF Corse	(Portugal) Rui Águas (France) Emmanuel Collard	Ferrari 458 Italia GT2	GTE; Am	331	27th	**2nd**
2017	(France) TDS Racing	(France) Emmanuel Collard (France) Matthieu Vaxivière	Oreca 07-Gibson	LMP2	213	DNF	DNF
2018	(France) TDS Racing	(France) Loïc Duval (France) Matthieu Vaxivière	Oreca 07-Gibson	LMP2	366	DSQ	DSQ
2019	(France) TDS Racing	(France) Loïc Duval (France) Matthieu Vaxivière	Oreca 07-Gibson	LMP2	366	8th	**3rd**
2020	(Italy) AF Corse	(Denmark) Nicklas Nielsen (France) Emmanuel Collard	Ferrari 488 GTE Evo	GTE; Am	339	26th	**3rd**
2021	(Italy) AF Corse	(Denmark) Nicklas Nielsen (Italy) Alessio Rovera	Ferrari 488 GTE Evo	GTE; Am	340	25th	**1st**
2022	(Italy) AF Corse	(Denmark) Nicklas Nielsen (Italy) Alessio Rovera	Oreca 07-Gibson	LMP2	361	24th	19th
2023	(Italy) AF Corse	(United Kingdom) Ben Barnicoat (France) Norman Nato	Oreca 07-Gibson	LMP2	183	DNF	DNF
2023	(Italy) AF Corse	(United Kingdom) Ben Barnicoat (France) Norman Nato	Oreca 07-Gibson	LMP2 Pro-Am	183	DNF	DNF
2024	(Italy) AF Corse	(United Kingdom) Ben Barnicoat (Argentina) Nicolás Varrone	Oreca 07-Gibson	LMP2	297	18th	4th
2024	(Italy) AF Corse	(United Kingdom) Ben Barnicoat (Argentina) Nicolás Varrone	Oreca 07-Gibson	LMP2 Pro-Am	297	18th	**1st**
2025	(Italy) AF Corse	(Portugal) António Félix da Costa (France) Matthieu Vaxivière	Oreca 07-Gibson	LMP2	364	26th	9th
2025	(Italy) AF Corse	(Portugal) António Félix da Costa (France) Matthieu Vaxivière	Oreca 07-Gibson	LMP2 Pro-Am	364	26th	4th
2026	(Italy) AF Corse	(United Kingdom) Ben Barnicoat (France) Matthieu Vaxivière	Oreca 07-Gibson	LMP2	357	23rd	9th
2026	(Italy) AF Corse	(United Kingdom) Ben Barnicoat (France) Matthieu Vaxivière	Oreca 07-Gibson	LMP2 Pro-Am	357	23rd	**2nd**

=== Complete IMSA SportsCar Championship results ===
(key) (Races in bold indicate pole position) (Races in italics indicate fastest lap)

Year	Team	Class	Car	Engine	1	2	3	4	5	6	7	8	9	10	11	12	Rank	Points	Ref
2015	AF Corse	GTLM	Ferrari 458 Italia GT2	Ferrari F136 4.5 L V8	DAY; 10	SEB	LBH	LGA	WGL	MOS	ELK	VIR	COA	PET			27th	22	
2017	EBIMOTORS	GTD	Lamborghini Huracán GT3	Lamborghini DGF 5.2 L V10	DAY; 9	SEB	LBH	COA	DET	WGL	MOS	LIM	ELK	VIR	LGA	PET	65th	22	
2023	AF Corse	LMP2	Oreca 07	Gibson GK428 4.2 L V8	DAY; 3	SEB	MON	WGL	ELK	IMS	PET; 4						24th	306	
2026	AF Corse USA	LMP2	Oreca 07	Gibson GK428 4.2 L V8	DAY; 13	SEB	WGL	MOS	ELK	IMS	PET						42nd	199	

=== Legends of Le Mans Series results ===
(key)

Complete Legends of Le Mans Series results
Year	Entrant	Class	Drivers	No.	Rds.	Rounds								
Year	Entrant	Class	Drivers	No.	Rds.	1	2	3	4	5	6	7	8	9
2026	(Monaco) JMB Racing	LMP2	(France) François Perrodo	83	1-2	**IMO**; **1**	**IMO**; **1**	**SPA**; **1**	**SPA**; **1**	**LMS**	**LMS**	**LMS**	**BAH**	**BAH**

Sporting positions
Preceded by Andrea Bertolini; Aleksey Basov; Viktor Shaitar	FIA Endurance Trophy for LMGTE Am Drivers; 2016; With: Emmanuel Collard & Rui Águas	Succeeded by Pedro Lamy; Mathias Lauda; Paul Dalla Lana
Preceded by Jörg Bergmeister; Patrick Lindsey; Egidio Perfetti	FIA Endurance Trophy for LMGTE Am Drivers; 2019-20; With: Emmanuel Collard & Nicklas Nielsen	Succeeded by Incumbent
