= Paul-Loup Chatin =

French racing driver

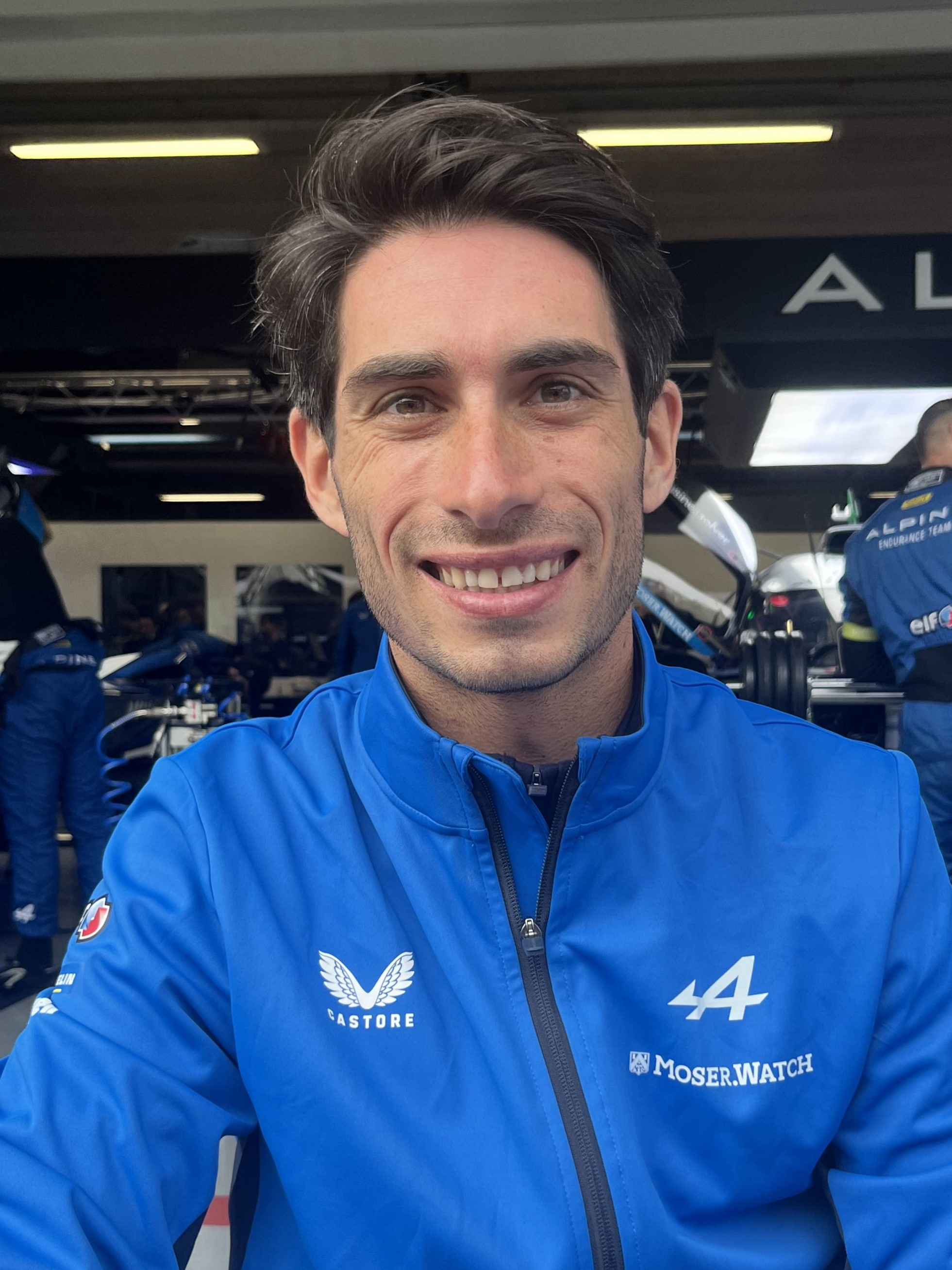
- Chatin at the 2025 6 Hours of São Paulo
- Nationality: (France) French
- Born: 19 October 1991 (age 35) Dourdan, France

ELMS – LMP2 career
- Debut season: 2014
- Categorisation: FIA Silver (until 2014); FIA Gold (2015–)
- Former teams: Signatech Alpine, Panis Barthez Compeitition, IDEC Sport
- Starts: 53 (53 entries)
- Wins: 7
- Poles: 5
- Fastest laps: 2
- Best finish: 1st in 2014, 2019

Previous series
- 2013 2011–12 2011–12 2010: ELMS – LMPC; Eurocup Formula Renault 2.0; Formula Renault 2.0 Alps; F4 Eurocup 1.6

Championship titles
- 2014, 2019 2013: ELMS – LMP2; ELMS – LMPC

Awards
- 2014 2013: ELMS LMP2 Driver of the Year; ELMS Revelation of the Year

Paul-Loup Chatin (born 19 October 1991) is a French professional racing driver. He has had notable successes within the LMP2 class, winning the European Le Mans Series in 2014 and 2019, as well as pole positions at the 2018 and 2023 iterations of the 24 Hours of Le Mans. Other achievements include a class victory at the 2021 24 Hours of Daytona and the LMP2 title in the 2023 IMSA SportsCar Championship.

Chatin competed in the FIA World Endurance Championship for Alpine Endurance Team before switching to the new Genesis Magma Racing project ahead of the 2026 season.

== Early career ==
=== Karting ===
Born in Dourdan, Chatin began his karting career in 2006 at the age of 14, progressing to the KF2 category by 2008.

=== Formula Renault ===
Chatin made his début in single-seaters in 2010, joining the F4 Eurocup 1.6 series. Chatin finished fourth in the championship, with two wins at Silverstone, behind his future Eurocup rivals Stoffel Vandoorne and Norman Nato.

In 2011, Chatin graduated to the Eurocup Formula Renault 2.0 series, with the Tech 1 Racing team. He finished ninth with a win on home soil at Le Castellet, and another podium finish, at Silverstone. He also had a full-time campaign in Formula Renault 2.0 Alps with the same team, collecting three consecutive victories at the Hungaroring and Le Castellet, finally finishing third in the championship.

For the 2012 season, Chatin remained in the Eurocup with Tech 1. He improved to sixth in the championship, but failed to achieve a victory during the campaign. He defended his third position in Formula Renault 2.0 Alps, losing the title fight to Daniil Kvyat and Nato.

== Sports car career ==
=== First endurance titles & WEC success (2013–2017) ===
In 2013, Chatin decided to switch to sports car racing, joining Team Endurance Challenge in the LMPC category of the European Le Mans Series. In a class with just two full-time entries, Chatin and teammate Gary Hirsch won the series title thanks to three wins at Imola, Spielberg and the Hungaroring. He won the award for being the series' Revelation of the Year.

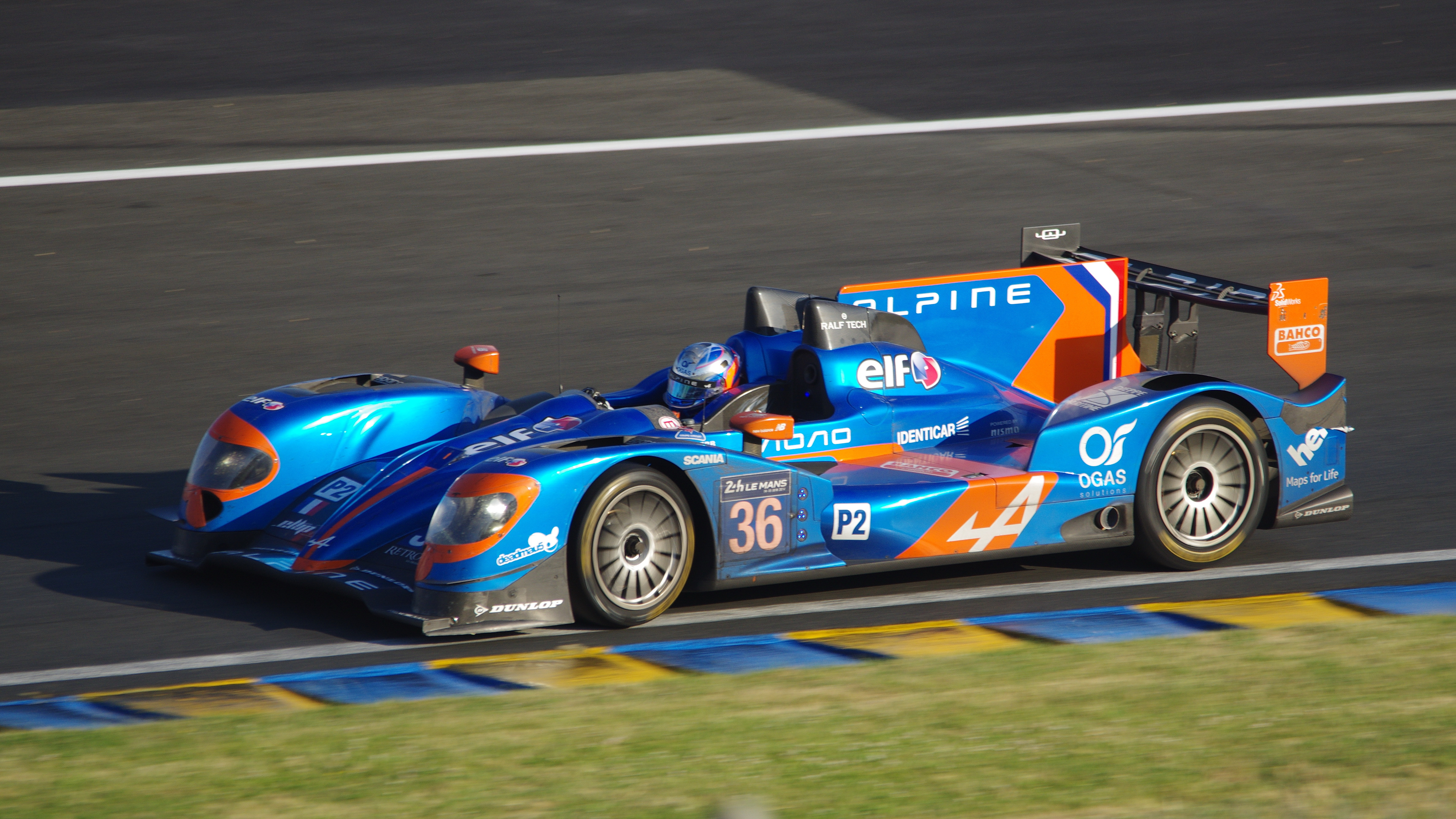
The 2014 ELMS title-winning Signatech Alpine of Chatin.

For the 2014 ELMS season, Chatin moved to the LMP2 category, joining the Signatech Alpine squad alongside Nelson Panciatici and Oliver Webb. The team were victorious at Spielberg, where Chatin's performance was described as "disciplined and strategic", and scored another two podiums. on their way to the championship title. A fifth place at Estoril was enough to clinch the title for Alpine. Chatin and his teammates also contested the 24 Hours of Le Mans. In spite of a suspension issue that struck whilst Chatin was second on Sunday, the team finished third in LMP2. After the season concluded, Chatin was named the ELMS's LMP2 Driver of the Year.

Remaining with Signatech Alpine, Chatin progressed to the FIA World Endurance Championship in 2015. In spite of retirements at Silverstone and Le Mans, the campaign proved to be a success, as the team finished second at Fuji and won at Shanghai on their way to fourth in the standings.

Chatin returned to the ELMS in 2016, partnering Timothé Buret and former French football goalkeeper Fabien Barthez. The team struggled despite Chatin's speed, proven by a fastest lap at Silverstone and a pole position in Imola, scoring a best result of seventh four times to finish eighth overall. The following year, Chatin sat out a lot of the season because of his studies, though he made two appearances in the ELMS, driving the final two races for IDEC Sport Racing.

=== IDEC Sport tenure, third ELMS title, IMSA LMP2 title (2018–2023) ===
2018 saw the beginning of the full-time partnership between Chatin and IDEC Sport, with the Frenchman being fielded in the ELMS alongside Memo Rojas and Paul Lafargue, the silver-ranked son of team owner Patrice Lafargue. Chatin led the outfit to a pair of third places, their first podiums in the series, as well as scoring the team's maiden pole positions at Le Castellet and Spielberg. These performances contributed to a third-placed finish at the end of the year. Additionally, Chatin and his teammates competed at Le Mans, where the Frenchman scored pole in qualifying.

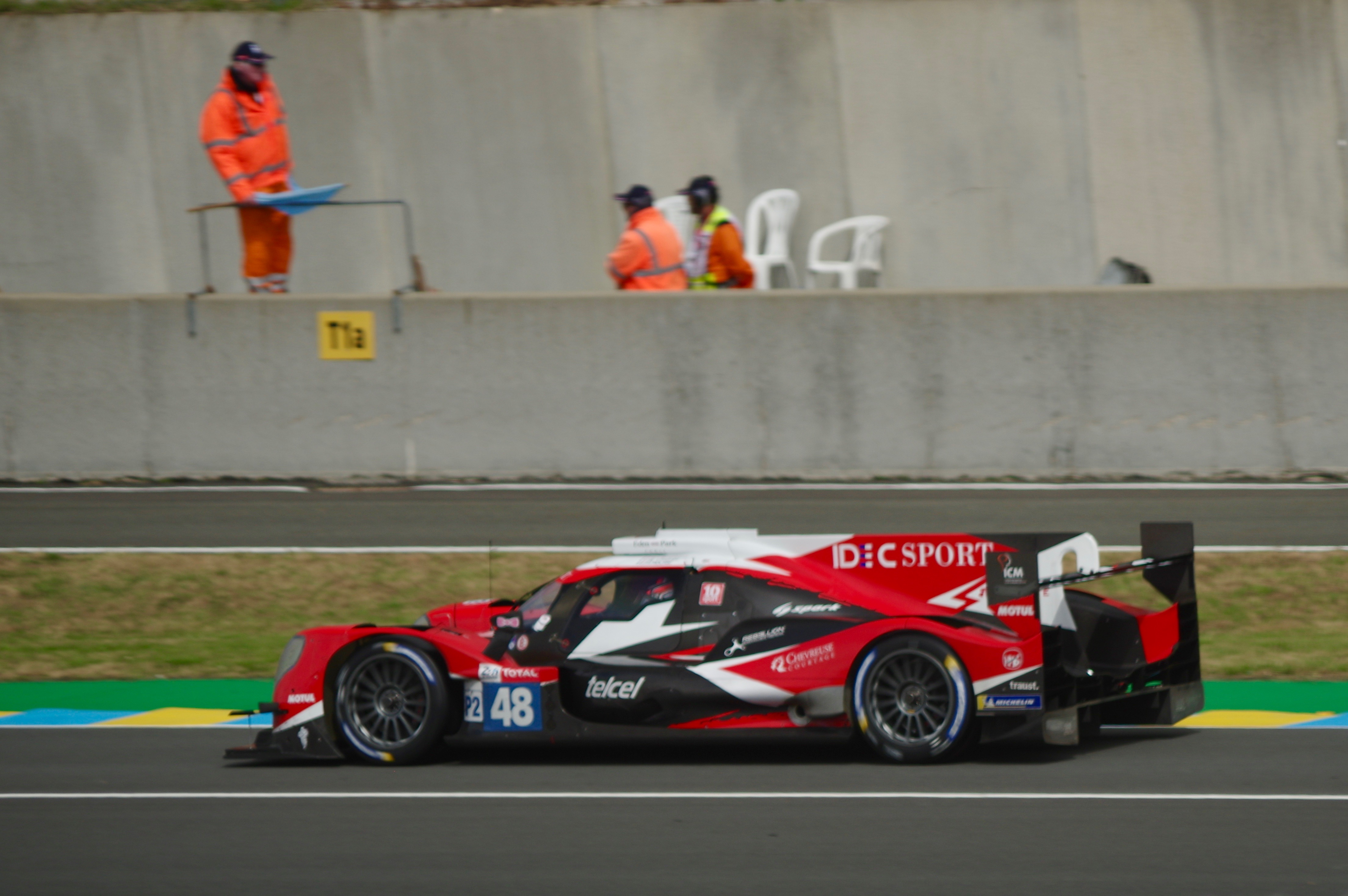
The IDEC Sport car that delivered Chatin his third ELMS title in 2019.

Reunited with Lafargue, Rojas, and IDEC Sport for the 2019 season, Chatin would start the year off with two runner-up finishes, before taking a pole position at Barcelona. At round 4 in Silvertsone, the team benefited from a late fuel-related pit stop for rivals G-Drive Racing to take its first win in the ELMS. At the following round in Spa, a crash for Chatin at Raidillon during practice forced IDEC to miss qualifying, though thanks to the sourcing of a new chassis the team recovered to sixth on Sunday. Chatin redeemed himself during the season finale in Portugal, charging through to take the lead from Phil Hanson before holding on to win the race and, by extension, the championship.

The pandemic-affected 2020 campaign proved to be challenging for Chatin, who was joined by Lafargue as well as Richard Bradley for the year. The trio managed a highest finish of seventh place and ended the season ninth in the teams' championship, with Chatin missing a race after contracting COVID-19. In 2021, Chatin and Lafargue partnered Patrick Pilet in the ELMS. In a quiet season, IDEC Sport ended up ninth in the teams' standings. That year did not fail to yield success for Chatin however, as he won the 24 Hours of Daytona in class for Era Motorsport.

In 2022, the trio of French drivers remained at IDEC, which reverted to a one-car operation. During the first half of the season, Chatin and his teammates took three successive top-five finishes, with the highlight being an imposing late stint by the French driver at Monza which brought victory back to the team. After this, the season brought disappointment, as IDEC fell back to fifth place by the end of the year.

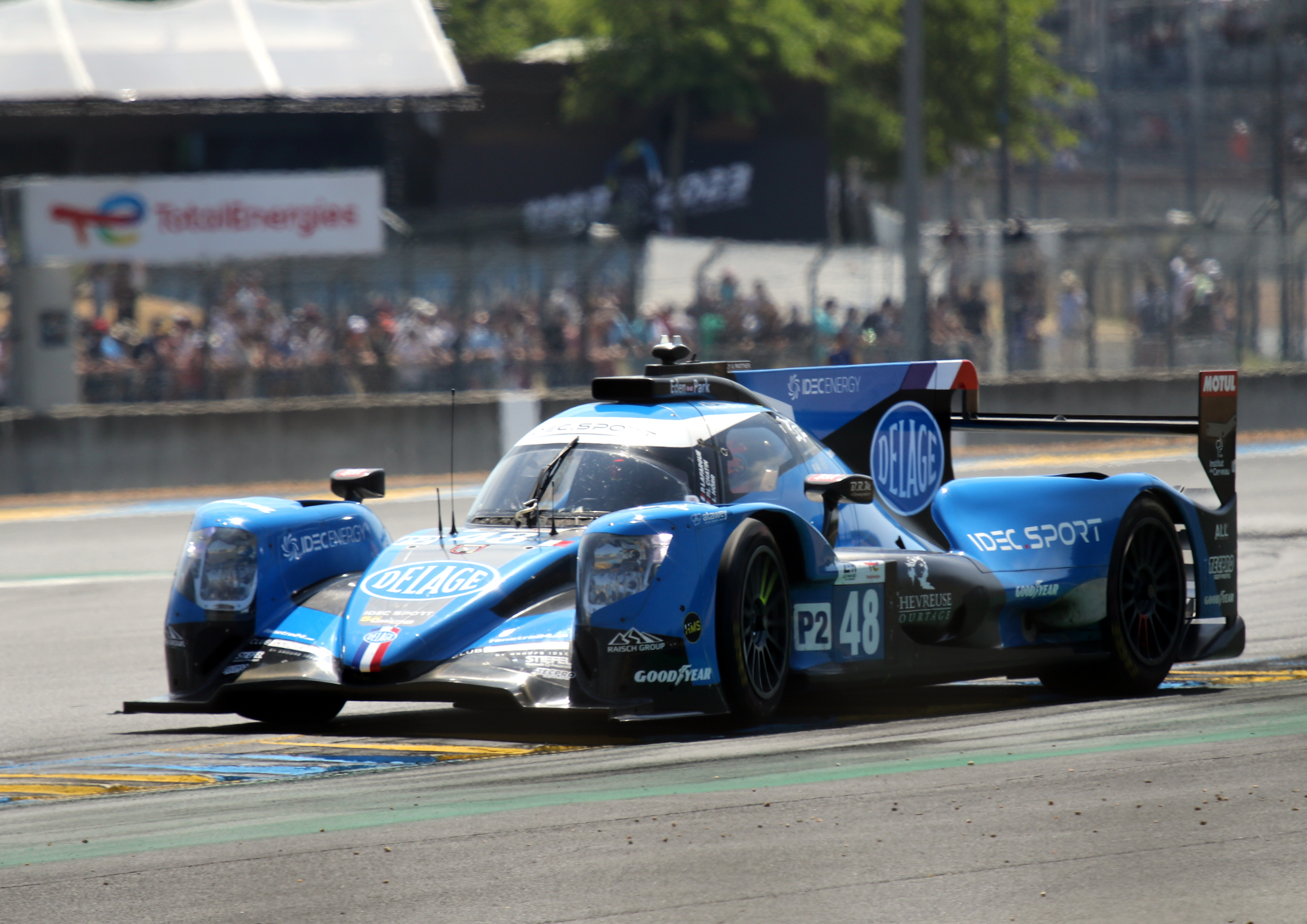
IDEC Sport's Delage-backed Oreca 07, which Chatin carried to LMP2 pole at the 2023 24 Hours of Le Mans.

Chatin remained in the ELMS for his sixth full season at IDEC Sport in 2023, partnering Lafargue and German LMP3 graduate Laurents Hörr. Though the squad failed to win a race, Chatin was able to lead IDEC to fifth in the standings with two LMP2 Pro class podiums and a pole position at the final event in Portimão. At the 24 Hours of Le Mans meanwhile, Chatin took LMP2 pole for the second time in his career, before putting the team in contention for a class podium — the chances of which were reduced to zero due to a late puncture. The 2023 season also saw Chatin compete in the IMSA SportsCar Championship for PR1/Mathiasen Motorsports alongside gentleman driver Ben Keating. Joined by silver-ranked rookie Alex Quinn at the endurance events, the duo took four podiums from seven races, including a win at Road America, and clinched the LMP2 class title with a runner-up result at Petit Le Mans.

=== Step-up to Hypercar (2024–present) ===
Ahead of the 2024 season, Chatin was announced to be joining the Alpine Endurance Team as a factory driver. As a result, he was chosen as one of the team's drivers in the Le Mans Hypercar category of the WEC, where he, Charles Milesi, and Ferdinand Habsburg would drive the No. 35 Alpine A424. Their season started well with a seventh place in the opening round at Qatar. Following a testing crash for Habsburg before the Imola race, Chatin replaced him at Cool Racing for the first two rounds of the ELMS season, before replacing Ritomo Miyata ahead of round three. In the WEC meanwhile, the next points finish came at Spa with a ninth place. Chatin qualified the No. 35 sixth at Le Mans, but the team retired early on with an engine failure. A standout result of fifth was achieved in Austin, though Chatin did not score points as he did not complete his minimum drive time. After sitting out the penultimate round in Fuji, Chatin returned at Bahrain and led the team to fourth with a charging final stint. This helped the team to finish fourth in the manufacturers' standings.

Chatin also drove in the IMSA SportsCar Championship with AO Racing during 2024, scoring a best class result of third at Road America.

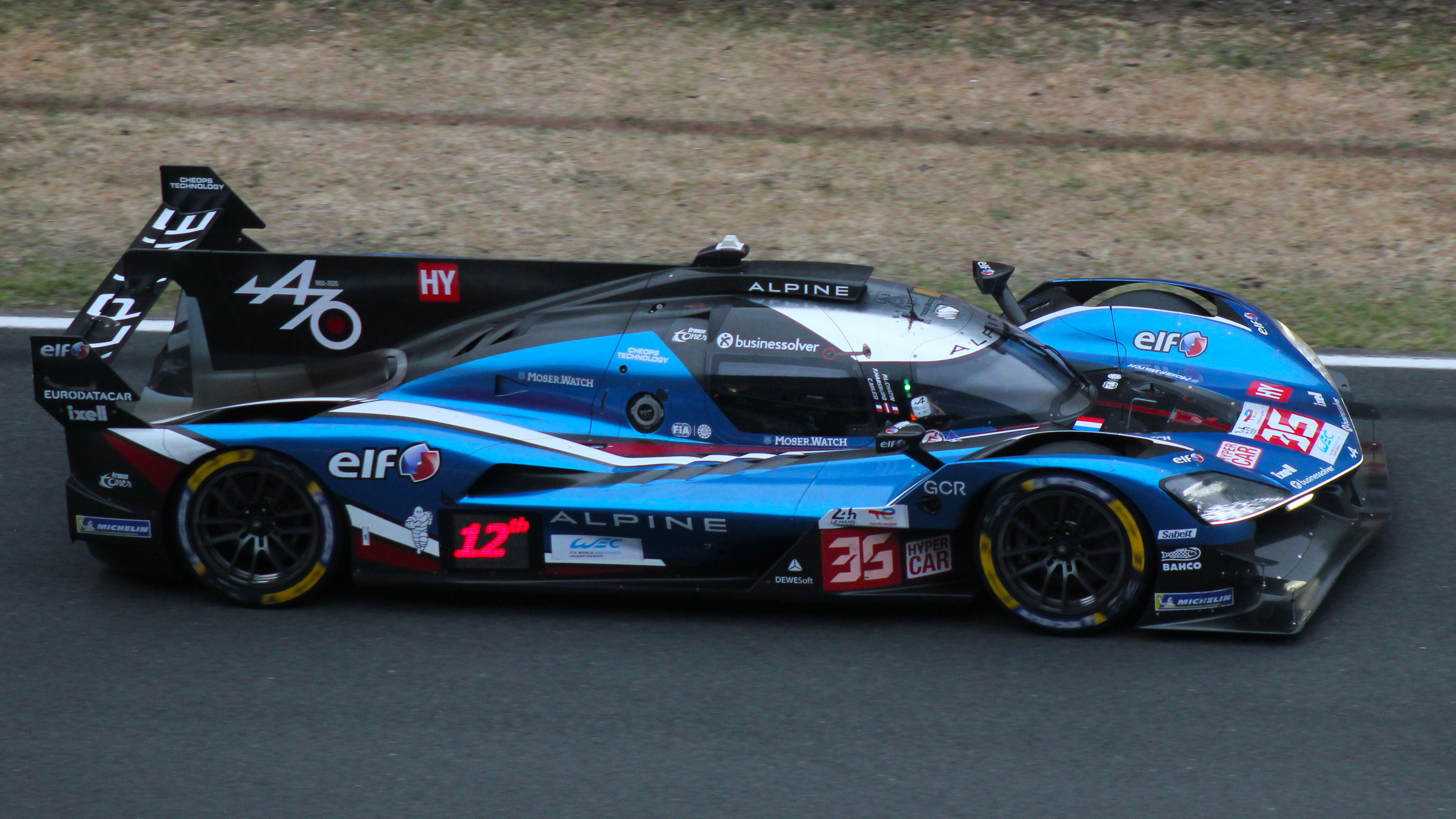
Chatin's No. 35 car at the 2025 24 Hours of Le Mans

In 2025, Chatin returned to Alpine's No. 35 WEC lineup alongside Milesi and Habsburg. In addition, Chatin rejoined IDEC Sport in the ELMS, partnering Job van Uitert and former teammate Paul Lafargue. The WEC season started discretely, as the No. 35 only scored its first points result at the third round in Spa with an eighth place — having been forced to pit from fourth late on to get a splash of fuel. At Le Mans, Chatin got involved in an incident with Loïc Duval during the evening, resulting in a drive-through penalty. Despite this, the No. 35 ended up ninth overall. Chatin and his teammates failed to score points in São Paulo and Austin, before having a standout day in Fuji: Chatin got to the front with a well-timed pit stop and remained there until Milesi stepped in; the latter then managed to take the lead with an inspired strategy of leaving two old tyres on at the last pit stop. The team held on to the lead and scored Alpine's first victory with the A424, as well as the first overall WEC victory for a fully gold-rated driver lineup. Chatin left Alpine following the final round, as the No. 35 crew outscored the No. 36 by one point in the drivers' standings.

In November 2025, it was announced that Chatin would join the Genesis Magma Racing team for the 2026 FIA World Endurance Championship season. Due to the nature of his Alpine contract however, Chatin was prevented from testing the Genesis GMR-001 or sitting in during technical debriefs with the team's engineers before 2026.

== Driving style ==
Following his maiden LMP2 season in 2014, Chatin was praised for his "well-judged" overtaking manoeuvres and described as a clean driver. Chatin is also notable for his speed in qualifying, exemplified by multiple ELMS pole positions as well as two LMP2 class poles at Le Mans (in 2018 and 2023). Longtime IDEC Sport teammate Paul Lafargue has talked about how Chatin "pulls [him] up" with his pace.

Ahead of his Hypercar debut in 2024, online newspaper Dailysportscar described Chatin as "one of the most highly rated of the LMP2 pack" who "correctly [got] a Hypercar shot".

== Personal life ==
During his time in endurance racing, Chatin has named four-time Le Mans 24 Hours winner Henri Pescarolo as his inspiration.

== Racing record ==
=== Career summary ===
Season	Series	Team	Races	Wins	Poles	F/Laps	Podiums	Points	Position
2010	F4 Eurocup 1.6	Auto Sport Academy	14	2	2	2	4	103	4th
2011	Eurocup Formula Renault 2.0	Tech 1 Racing	14	1	1	0	2	75	9th
2011	Formula Renault 2.0 Alps	Tech 1 Racing	14	3	2	3	9	326	**3rd**
2011	Formula Renault 2.0 Northern European Cup	Tech 1 Racing	2	0	0	0	0	0	NC†
2012	Eurocup Formula Renault 2.0	Tech 1 Racing	14	0	0	0	1	77	6th
2012	Formula Renault 2.0 Alps	Tech 1 Racing	14	1	2	1	11	194	**3rd**
2013	Porsche Carrera Cup France	Tsunami RT	10	1	0	0	1	91	9th
2013	Porsche Carrera Cup Italia	Tsunami RT	2	1	1	0	2	32	9th
2013	European Le Mans Series - LMPC	Team Endurance Challenge	5	3	2	4	5	115	**1st**
2014	European Le Mans Series - LMP2	Signatech-Alpine	5	1	0	0	3	78	**1st**
2014	24 Hours of Le Mans - LMP2	Signatech-Alpine	1	0	0	0	1	N/A	**3rd**
2015	Renault Sport Trophy	Monlau Competicion	1	0	0	0	0	6	15th
2015	Blancpain Endurance Series - GT3 Am	Delahaye Racing	1	0	0	0	0	15	17th
2015	FIA World Endurance Championship - LMP2	Signatech-Alpine	8	1	1	0	2	86	4th
2015	24 Hours of Le Mans - LMP2	Signatech-Alpine	1	0	0	0	0	N/A	18th
2016	FIA World Endurance Championship - LMP2	Panis-Barthez Compétition	4	0	0	0	0	14	26th
2016	European Le Mans Series - LMP2	Panis-Barthez Compétition	6	0	1	1	0	8	13th
2016	24 Hours of Le Mans - LMP2	Panis-Barthez Compétition	1	0	0	0	0	N/A	8th
2017	European Le Mans Series - LMP2	IDEC Sport Racing	2	0	0	0	0	2	24th
2017	GT4 European Series Southern Cup - Pro-Am	L'Espace Bienvenue	2	0	0	0	0	N/A	NC
2018	European Le Mans Series - LMP2	IDEC Sport	6	0	2	0	2	64	4th
2018	24 Hours of Le Mans - LMP2	IDEC Sport	1	0	1	0	0	N/A	14th
2019	European Le Mans Series - LMP2	IDEC Sport	6	2	1	0	4	125	**1st**
2019	24 Hours of Le Mans - LMP2	IDEC Sport	1	0	0	0	0	N/A	5th
2020	European Le Mans Series - LMP2	IDEC Sport	4	0	0	0	0	13	18th
2020	24 Hours of Le Mans - LMP2	IDEC Sport	1	0	0	0	0	N/A	6th
2021	IMSA Sportscar Championship - LMP2	Era Motorsport w/ IDEC Sport	2	1	0	0	1	0	NC
2021	European Le Mans Series - LMP2	IDEC Sport	6	0	0	0	0	32	9th
2021	24H GT Series - GT3	IDEC Sport	1	1	0	0	1	0	NC†
2021	FIA World Endurance Championship - LMP2	Racing Team Nederland	1	0	0	0	1	15	19th
2022	European Le Mans Series - LMP2	IDEC Sport	6	1	0	1	1	53	6th
2022	24 Hours of Le Mans - LMP2	IDEC Sport	1	0	0	0	0	N/A	8th
2022	FIA World Endurance Championship - LMP2	Richard Mille Racing Team	3	0	0	0	0	10	20th
2022	IMSA SportsCar Championship - LMP2	Era Motorsport	1	0	0	1	0	0	NC
2023	European Le Mans Series - LMP2	IDEC Sport	6	0	1	0	2	72	5th
2023	24 Hours of Le Mans - LMP2	IDEC Sport	1	0	1	0	0	N/A	6th
2023	IMSA SportsCar Championship - LMP2	PR1/Mathiasen Motorsports	7	1	0	2	4	1995	**1st**
2023–24	Asian Le Mans Series - LMP2	Proton Competition	5	0	0	0	0	30	9th
2024	FIA World Endurance Championship - Hypercar	Alpine Endurance Team	7	0	0	0	0	29	18th
2024	IMSA SportsCar Championship - LMP2	AO Racing	6	0	0	0	1	1677	12th
2024	European Le Mans Series - LMP2	Cool Racing	3	0	0	0	1	18	18th
2025	FIA World Endurance Championship - Hypercar	Alpine Endurance Team	8	1	0	0	1	37	14th
2025	IMSA SportsCar Championship - LMP2	Era Motorsport	2	0	0	0	0	606	35th
2025	European Le Mans Series - LMP2	IDEC Sport	6	0	0	0	0	40	8th
2026	European Le Mans Series - LMP2	IDEC Sport	6	0	0	0	2	35	10th
2026	FIA World Endurance Championship - Hypercar	Genesis Magma Racing	4	0	0	0	0	0*	20th*
2026	24 Hours of Le Mans - Hypercar	Genesis Magma Racing	1	0	0	0	0	N/A	13th

=== Complete F4 Eurocup 1.6 results ===
(key) (Races in bold indicate pole position) (Races in italics indicate fastest lap)

Year	1	2	3	4	5	6	7	8	9	10	11	12	13	14	Pos	Points
2010	ALC; 1; 4	ALC; 2; 8	SPA; 1; 10	SPA; 2; 10	MAG; 1; 11	MAG; 2; 4	HUN; 1; 4	HUN; 2; 7	HOC; 1; 4	HOC; 2; 2	**SIL**; **1**; 1	**SIL**; **2**; 1	CAT; 1; 2	CAT; 2; 7	4th	103

=== Complete Formula Renault 2.0 NEC results ===
(key) (Races in bold indicate pole position) (Races in italics indicate fastest lap)

Year	Entrant	1	2	3	4	5	6	7	8	9	10	11	12	13	14	15	16	17	18	19	20	DC	Points
2011	Tech 1 Racing	HOC; 1	HOC; 2	HOC; 3	SPA; 1; 11	SPA; 2; 9	NÜR; 1	NÜR; 2	ASS; 1	ASS; 2	ASS; 3	OSC; 1	OSC; 2	ZAN; 1	ZAN; 2	MST; 1	MST; 2	MST; 3	MNZ; 1	MNZ; 2	MNZ; 3	NC†	0

† As Chatin was a guest driver, he was ineligible for points

=== Complete Eurocup Formula Renault 2.0 results ===
(key) (Races in bold indicate pole position) (Races in italics indicate fastest lap)

Year	Entrant	1	2	3	4	5	6	7	8	9	10	11	12	13	14	Pos	Points
2011	Tech 1 Racing	ALC; 1 Ret	ALC; 2; 9	SPA; 1; 11	SPA; 2; 9	NÜR; 1; 8	NÜR; 2; 9	HUN; 1; 29	HUN; 2; 6	SIL; 1; 5	SIL; 2; 3	**LEC**; **1**; 1	LEC; 2; 8	CAT; 1; 13	CAT; 2; 9	9th	75
2012	Tech 1 Racing	ALC; 1; 5	ALC; 2; 10	SPA; 1; 6	SPA; 2; 5	NÜR; 1; 3	NÜR; 2; 4	MSC; 1; 12	MSC; 2; 10	HUN; 1; 12	HUN; 2; 15	LEC; 1; 14	LEC; 2; 4	CAT; 1; 6	CAT; 2; 28	6th	77

=== Complete Formula Renault 2.0 Alps Series results ===
(key) (Races in bold indicate pole position; races in italics indicate fastest lap)

Year	Team	1	2	3	4	5	6	7	8	9	10	11	12	13	14	Pos	Points
2011	Tech 1 Racing	MNZ; 1; 2	MNZ; 2; 14	IMO; 1; 3	IMO; 2; 6	PAU; 1; 3	PAU; 2; 2	RBR; 1; 2	RBR; 2; 3	HUN; 1; 4	HUN; 2; 1	**LEC**; **1**; 1	**LEC**; **2**; 1	SPA; 1; 17	SPA; 2; 5	3rd	326
2012	Tech 1 Racing	**MNZ**; **1**; 3	MNZ; 2; 2	PAU; 1; 2	**PAU**; **2**; 1	IMO; 1; 3	IMO; 2 Ret	SPA; 1; 2	SPA; 2; 3	RBR; 1; 14	RBR; 2; 12	MUG; 1; 3	MUG; 2; 3	CAT; 1; 2	CAT; 2; 2	3rd	194

=== Complete European Le Mans Series results ===
(key) (Races in bold indicate pole position; results in italics indicate fastest lap)

Year	Entrant	Class	Chassis	Engine	1	2	3	4	5	6	Rank	Points
2013	Team Endurance Challenge	LMPC	Oreca FLM09	Chevrolet LS3 6.2L V8	**SIL**; 2	**IMO**; 1	RBR; 1	**HUN**; 1	**LEC**; 2		1st	115
2014	Signatech Alpine	LMP2	Alpine (Oreca 03)	Nissan VK45DE 4.5 L V8	SIL; 5	IMO; 3	RBR; 1	LEC; 2	EST; 5		1st	78
2016	Panis Barthez Competition	LMP2	Oreca 05	Nissan VK45DE 4.5 L V8	SIL; 9	**IMO**; 7	RBR; 7	LEC; 10	SPA; 7	EST; 7	12th	27.5
2017	IDEC Sport Racing	LMP2	Ligier JS P217	Gibson GK428 4.2 V8	SIL	MNZ	RBR	LEC	SPA; 10	ALG; 10	24th	2
2018	IDEC Sport	LMP2	Oreca 07	Gibson GK428 4.2 L V8	**LEC**; 7	MNZ; 3	**RBR**; 4	SIL; 3	SPA; 4‡	ALG; 6	4th	64
2019	IDEC Sport	LMP2	Oreca 07	Gibson GK428 4.2 L V8	LEC; 2	MNZ; 2	**CAT**; 5	SIL; 1	SPA; 5	ALG; 1	1st	105
2020	IDEC Sport	LMP2	Oreca 07	Gibson GK428 4.2 L V8	LEC; Ret	SPA; 7	LEC; 7	MNZ	ALG; 10		18th	13
2021	IDEC Sport	LMP2	Oreca 07	Gibson GK428 4.2 L V8	CAT; 8	RBR; 6	LEC; 9	MNZ; 9	SPA; 6	ALG; 7	9th	32
2022	IDEC Sport	LMP2	Oreca 07	Gibson GK428 4.2 L V8	LEC; 4	IMO; 5	MNZ; 1	CAT; 13	SPA; Ret	ALG; 7	6th	53
2023	IDEC Sport	LMP2	Oreca 07	Gibson GK428 4.2 L V8	CAT; 3	LEC; 5	ARA; 2	SPA; 4	POR; 7	**ALG**; 6	5th	70
2024	Cool Racing	LMP2	Oreca 07	Gibson GK428 4.2 L V8	CAT; 12	LEC; 2	IMO; Ret	SPA	MUG	ALG	18th	18
2025	IDEC Sport	LMP2	Oreca 07	Gibson GK428 4.2 L V8	CAT; 8	LEC; 11	IMO; Ret	SPA; 4	SIL; 4	ALG; 4	8th	40
2026	IDEC Sport	LMP2	Oreca 07	Gibson GK428 4.2 L V8	CAT; 10	LEC; 3	IMO; 11	SPA; 10	SIL; 2	ALG; Ret	10th	35

=== 24 Hours of Le Mans results ===
Year	Team	Co-Drivers	Car	Class	Laps	Pos.	Class Pos.
2014	(France) Signatech-Alpine	(United Kingdom) Oliver Webb (France) Nelson Panciatici	Alpine A450b-Nissan	LMP2	355	7th	**3rd**
2015	(France) Signatech-Alpine	(France) Nelson Panciatici (France) Vincent Capillaire	Alpine A450b-Nissan	LMP2	110	DNF	DNF
2016	(France) Panis Barthez Compétition	(France) Fabien Barthez (France) Timothé Buret	Ligier JS P2-Nissan	LMP2	347	12th	8th
2018	(France) IDEC Sport	(France) Paul Lafargue (Mexico) Memo Rojas	Oreca 07-Gibson	LMP2	312	DNF	DNF
2019	(France) IDEC Sport	(France) Paul Lafargue (Mexico) Memo Rojas	Oreca 07-Gibson	LMP2	364	10th	5th
2020	(France) IDEC Sport	(France) Paul Lafargue (United Kingdom) Richard Bradley	Oreca 07-Gibson	LMP2	366	10th	6th
2021	(France) IDEC Sport	(France) Paul Lafargue (France) Patrick Pilet	Oreca 07-Gibson	LMP2	359	11th	6th
2022	(France) IDEC Sport	(France) Paul Lafargue (France) Patrick Pilet	Oreca 07-Gibson	LMP2	366	12th	8th
2023	(France) IDEC Sport	(Germany) Laurents Hörr (France) Paul Lafargue	Oreca 07-Gibson	LMP2	327	14th	6th
2024	(France) Alpine Endurance Team	(Austria) Ferdinand Habsburg (France) Charles Milesi	Alpine A424	Hypercar	75	DNF	DNF
2025	(France) Alpine Endurance Team	(Austria) Ferdinand Habsburg (France) Charles Milesi	Alpine A424	Hypercar	385	9th	9th
2026	(South Korea) Genesis Magma Racing	(France) Mathieu Jaminet (Spain) Daniel Juncadella	Genesis GMR-001	Hypercar	372	13th	13th

=== Complete FIA World Endurance Championship results ===
(key) (Races in bold indicate pole position; races in italics indicate fastest lap)

Year	Entrant	Class	Chassis	Engine	1	2	3	4	5	6	7	8	9	Rank	Points
2015	Signatech Alpine	LMP2	Alpine A450b	Nissan VK45DE 4.5 L V8	SIL; Ret	SPA; 5	LMS; Ret	NÜR; 5	COA; 5	FUJ; 2	SHA; 1	BHR; 4		4th	86
2016	Panis-Barthez Compétition	LMP2	Ligier JS P2	Nissan VK45DE 4.5 L V8	SIL	SPA	LMS; 8	NÜR	MEX	COA				26th	14
2016	Baxi DC Racing Alpine	LMP2	Alpine A460	Nissan VK45DE 4.5 L V8							FUJ; 9	SHA; 8	BHR; 6	26th	14
2021	Racing Team Nederland	LMP2	Oreca 07	Gibson GK428 4.2 L V8	SPA	ALG	MNZ; 3		BHR	BHR				19th	15
2021	IDEC Sport	LMP2	Oreca 07	Gibson GK428 4.2 L V8				LMS; 6						19th	15
2022	Richard Mille Racing Team	LMP2	Oreca 07	Gibson GK428 4.2 L V8	SEB	SPA	LMS	MNZ; 14	FUJ; 8	BHR; 8				20th	10
2024	Alpine Endurance Team	Hypercar	Alpine A424	Alpine 3.4 L Turbo V6	QAT; 7	IMO; 13	SPA; 9	LMS; Ret	SÃO; 12	COA; 5 (Note: Chatin did not fulfil his mandated minimum drive time at Lone Star Le Mans, meaning that he did not receive points for that event.)	FUJ	BHR; 4		18th	29
2025	Alpine Endurance Team	Hypercar	Alpine A424	Alpine 3.4 L Turbo V6	QAT; 14	IMO; 13	SPA; 8	LMS; 8	SÃO; 18	COA; 11	FUJ; 1	BHR; 11		14th	37
2026	Genesis Magma Racing	Hypercar	Genesis GMR-001	Genesis G8MR 3.2 L Turbo V8	IMO; 17	SPA; 13	LMS; 12	SÃO; 13	COA	FUJ	CAT	MNZ		20th*	0*

=== Complete WeatherTech SportsCar Championship results ===
(key) (Races in bold indicate pole position; results in italics indicate fastest lap)

Year	Team	Class	Make	Engine	1	2	3	4	5	6	7	Pos.	Points
2021	Era Motorsport	LMP2	Oreca 07	Gibson Technology GK428 V8	DAY; 1	SEB	WGI	WGI	ELK	LGA	ATL	NC†	0†
2022	Era Motorsport	LMP2	Oreca 07	Gibson GK428 V8	DAY; 7	SEB	LGA	MDO	WGL	ELK	PET	NC†	0†
2023	PR1/Mathiasen Motorsports	LMP2	Oreca 07	Gibson GK428 4.2 L V8	**DAY**; 7	**SEB**; 4	LGA; 2	WGL; 3	ELK; 1	**IMS**; 4	**PET**; 2	1st	1995
2024	AO Racing	LMP2	Oreca 07	Gibson GK428 4.2 L V8	DAY; 8	**SEB**; 11	**WGL**; 7	MOS	**ELK**; 3	IMS; 4	ATL; 7	12th	1677
2025	Era Motorsport	LMP2	Oreca 07	Gibson GK428 4.2 L V8	DAY; 4	SEB	WGL; 4	MOS	ELK	IMS	ATL	35th	606

^{†} Points only counted towards the Michelin Endurance Cup, and not the overall LMP2 Championship.

=== Complete Asian Le Mans Series results ===
(key) (Races in bold indicate pole position) (Races in italics indicate fastest lap)

Year	Team	Class	Car	Engine	1	2	3	4	5	Pos.	Points
2023–24	Proton Competition	LMP2	Oreca 07	Gibson GK428 4.2 L V8	SEP; 1; 4	SEP; 2; 5	**DUB**; 7	ABU; 1; 10	ABU; 2 Ret	9th	30

=== Awards & Nationale Team ===
Year	Team	Car	Class	Award
2014	(France) Signatech-Alpine	Alpine A450b-Nissan	LMP2	**Prix Jean Rondeau**
2013	Team Endurance Challenge	Oreca	ELMS-LMPC	**Revelation of the Year 2013**
2010	Autosport Academy	F4	F4 - 1.6L	**1st Volant EuroFormula**
2012	Tech1 Racing		WSR 2.0L	**FFSA French Team**
2011	Tech1 Racing		WSR 2.0L	**FIA Young Driver Excellence Academy**

== Notes ==
Sporting positions
Preceded by Nelson Panciatici; Pierre Ragues	European Le Mans Series; LMP2 Champion; 2014; With: Nelson Panciatici & Oliver Webb	Succeeded by Jon Lancaster; Björn Wirdheim; Gary Hirsch
Preceded by Andrea Pizzitola; Roman Rusinov	European Le Mans Series; LMP2 Champion; 2019; With: Memo Rojas	Succeeded by Filipe Albuquerque; Phil Hanson
