= Vert-le-Petit =

Commune in Île-de-France, France

- Commune
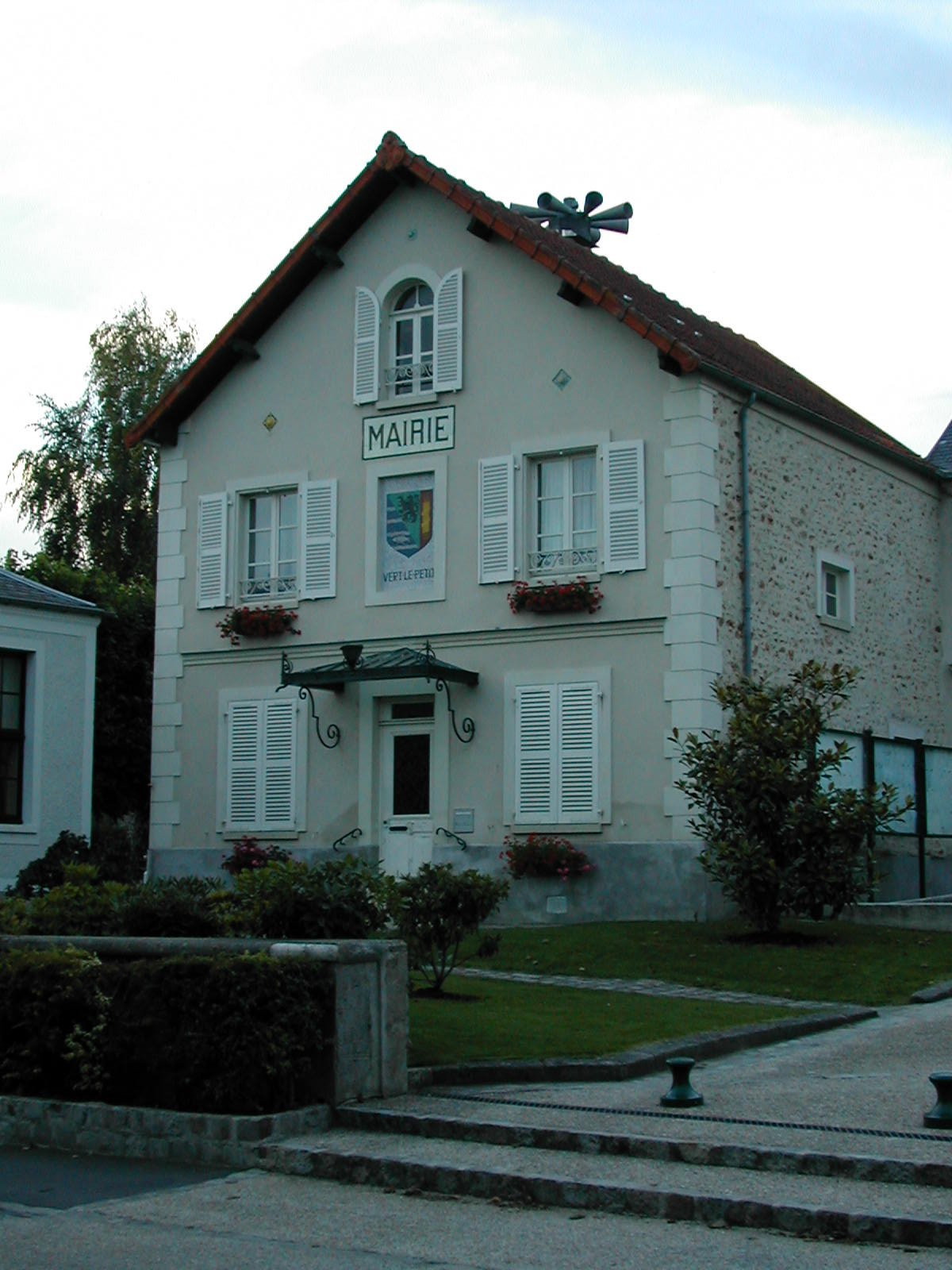
- The town hall in Vert-le-Petit

- Coat of arms
- Location of Vert-le-Petit
- Location within France Location within Île-de-France (region)
- Coordinates: 48°33′04″N 2°21′58″E
- Country: France
- Region: Île-de-France
- Department: Essonne
- Arrondissement: Évry
- Canton: Ris-Orangis
- Intercommunality: Val d'Essonne

Government
  - Mayor (2020–2026): Laurence Budelot
- Area^{1}: 6.83 km^{2} (2.64 sq mi)
- Highest elevation: 77 m (253 ft)
- Lowest elevation: 47 m (154 ft)
- Population (2023): 2,714
  - Density: 397/km^{2} (1,030/sq mi)
- Time zone: UTC+01:00 (CET)
  - Summer (DST): UTC+02:00 (CEST)
- INSEE/Postal code: 91649 /91710
- ^{1} French Land Register data, which excludes lakes, ponds, glaciers > 1 km^{2} (0.386 sq mi or 247 acres) and river estuaries.

Vert-le-Petit (French pronunciation: [vɛʁ lə pəti]) is a commune in the Essonne department in Île-de-France in northern France. General Auguste Jubé de La Perelle (1765–1824) was born in Vert-le-Petit.

== Geography ==
The Juine forms part of the commune's southern border, then flows into the Essonne, which forms the commune eastern border.

== Population ==
Historical population
Year	Pop.	±% p.a.
1968	1,875	—
1975	1,816	−0.46%
1982	1,798	−0.14%
1990	2,025	+1.50%
1999	2,422	+2.01%
2007	2,530	+0.55%
2012	2,776	+1.87%
2017	2,790	+0.10%
2023	2,714	−0.46%
Source: INSEE

Inhabitants of Vert-le-Petit are known as Vertois in French.

== See also ==
- Communes of the Essonne department
