= Canton of Ris-Orangis =

Coordinates: 48.65°N 2.41°E

The canton of Ris-Orangis is an administrative division of the Essonne department, Île-de-France region, northern France. Its borders were modified at the French canton reorganisation which came into effect in March 2015. Its seat is in Ris-Orangis.

It consists of the following communes:

1. Bondoufle
2. Fleury-Mérogis
3. Le Plessis-Pâté
4. Ris-Orangis
5. Vert-le-Grand
6. Vert-le-Petit
