= Vert-le-Grand =

Commune in Île-de-France, France

- Commune
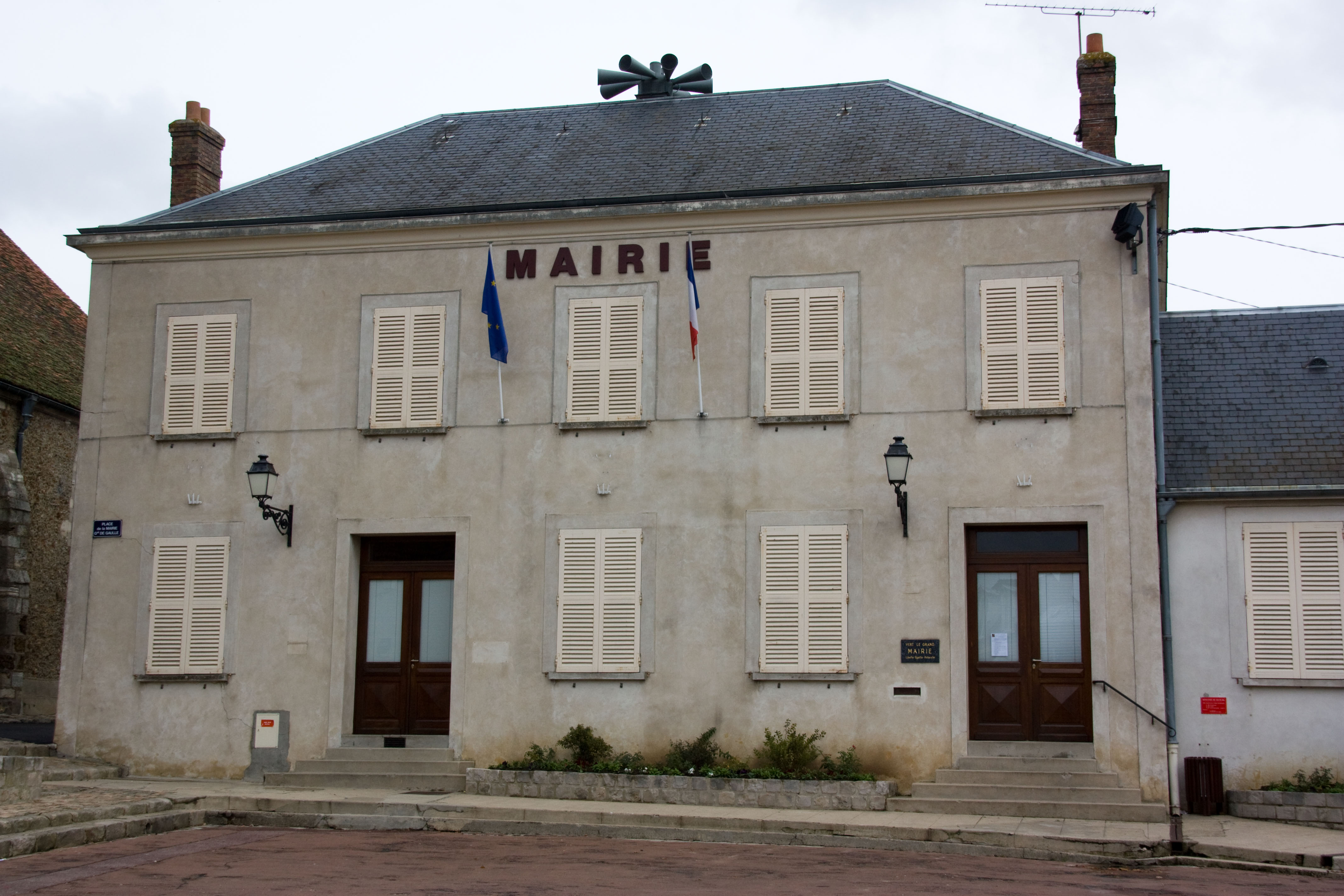
- The town hall in Vert-le-Grand

- Coat of arms
- Location of Vert-le-Grand
- Location within France Location within Île-de-France (region)
- Coordinates: 48°34′24″N 2°21′33″E
- Country: France
- Region: Île-de-France
- Department: Essonne
- Arrondissement: Évry
- Canton: Ris-Orangis
- Intercommunality: Val d'Essonne

Government
  - Mayor (2020–2026): Thierry Marais
- Area^{1}: 15.93 km^{2} (6.15 sq mi)
- Highest elevation: 121 m (397 ft)
- Lowest elevation: 54 m (177 ft)
- Population (2023): 2,444
  - Density: 153.4/km^{2} (397.4/sq mi)
- Time zone: UTC+01:00 (CET)
  - Summer (DST): UTC+02:00 (CEST)
- INSEE/Postal code: 91648 /91810
- ^{1} French Land Register data, which excludes lakes, ponds, glaciers > 1 km^{2} (0.386 sq mi or 247 acres) and river estuaries.

Vert-le-Grand (French pronunciation: [vɛʁ lə ɡʁɑ̃]) is a commune in the Essonne department and Île-de-France region of north-central France.

== Population ==
Historical population
Year	Pop.	±% p.a.
1968	828	—
1975	1,248	+6.04%
1982	1,282	+0.38%
1990	1,477	+1.79%
1999	1,911	+2.90%
2007	2,356	+2.65%
2012	2,396	+0.34%
2017	2,322	−0.63%
2023	2,444	+0.86%
Source: INSEE

The inhabitants of Vert-le-Grand are known in French as les Grandvertois.

== See also ==
- Communes of the Essonne department

== Twin town ==
- (United Kingdom) Wingham, Kent
