= Le Plessis-Pâté =

Commune in Île-de-France, France

- Commune
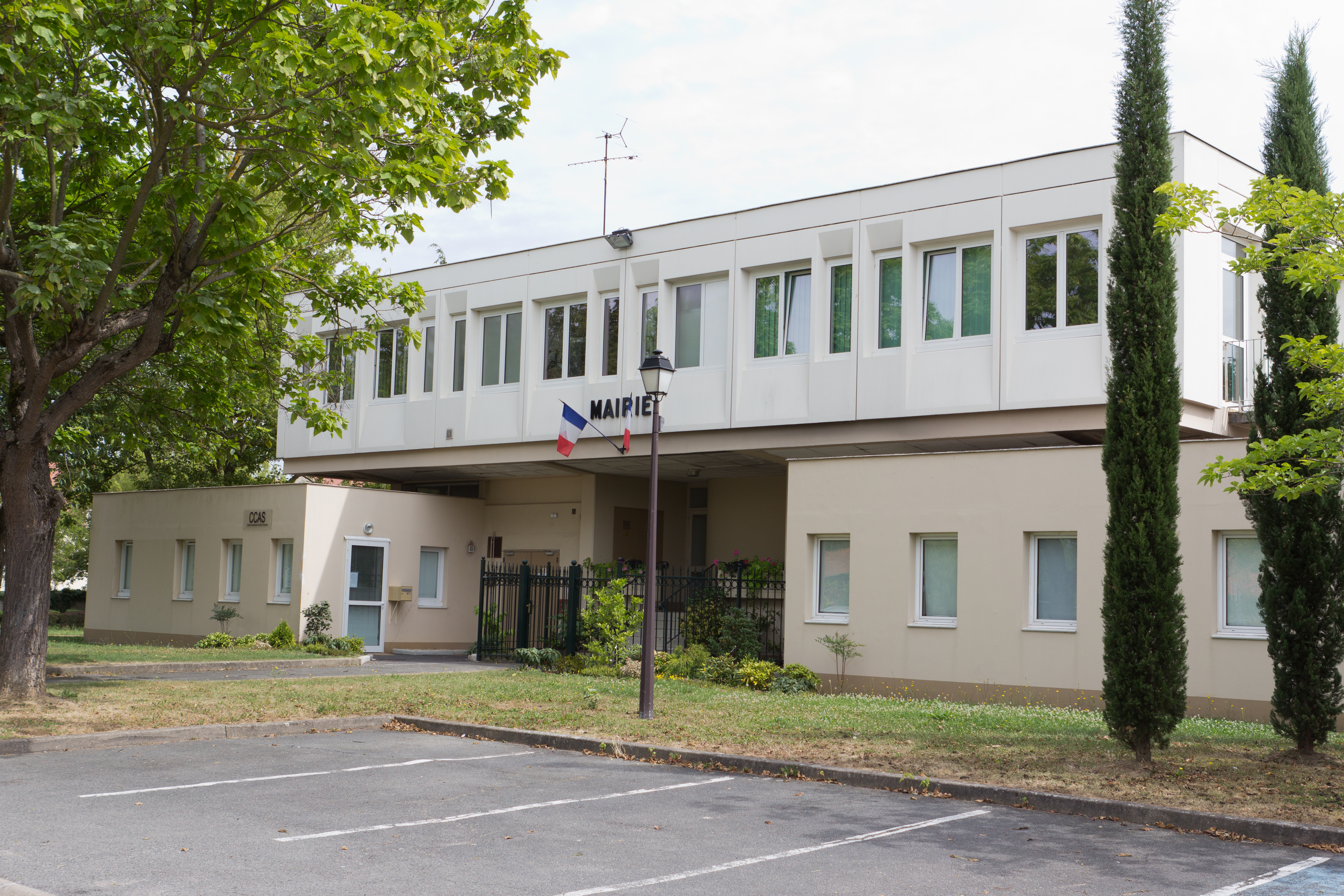
- The town hall in Le Plessis-Pâté

- Coat of arms
- Location of Le Plessis-Pâté
- Location within France Location within Île-de-France (region)
- Coordinates: 48°36′44″N 2°19′31″E
- Country: France
- Region: Île-de-France
- Department: Essonne
- Arrondissement: Palaiseau
- Canton: Ris-Orangis
- Intercommunality: CA Cœur d'Essonne

Government
  - Mayor (2020–2026): Sylvain Tanguy
- Area^{1}: 7.58 km^{2} (2.93 sq mi)
- Highest elevation: 83 m (272 ft)
- Lowest elevation: 76 m (249 ft)
- Population (2023): 4,154
  - Density: 548/km^{2} (1,420/sq mi)
- Time zone: UTC+01:00 (CET)
  - Summer (DST): UTC+02:00 (CEST)
- INSEE/Postal code: 91494 /91220
- ^{1} French Land Register data, which excludes lakes, ponds, glaciers > 1 km^{2} (0.386 sq mi or 247 acres) and river estuaries.

Le Plessis-Pâté (French pronunciation: [lə plɛsi pate]) is a commune in the Essonne department in Île-de-France in northern France.

== Population ==
Historical population
Year	Pop.	±% p.a.
1968	622	—
1975	1,249	+10.47%
1982	2,719	+11.75%
1990	2,798	+0.36%
1999	2,926	+0.50%
2007	3,921	+3.73%
2012	4,096	+0.88%
2017	4,103	+0.03%
2023	4,154	+0.21%
Source: INSEE

Inhabitants of Le Plessis-Pâté are known as Plesséiens in French.

== See also ==
- Communes of the Essonne department
