= Fleury-Mérogis =

Commune in Île-de-France, France

- Commune
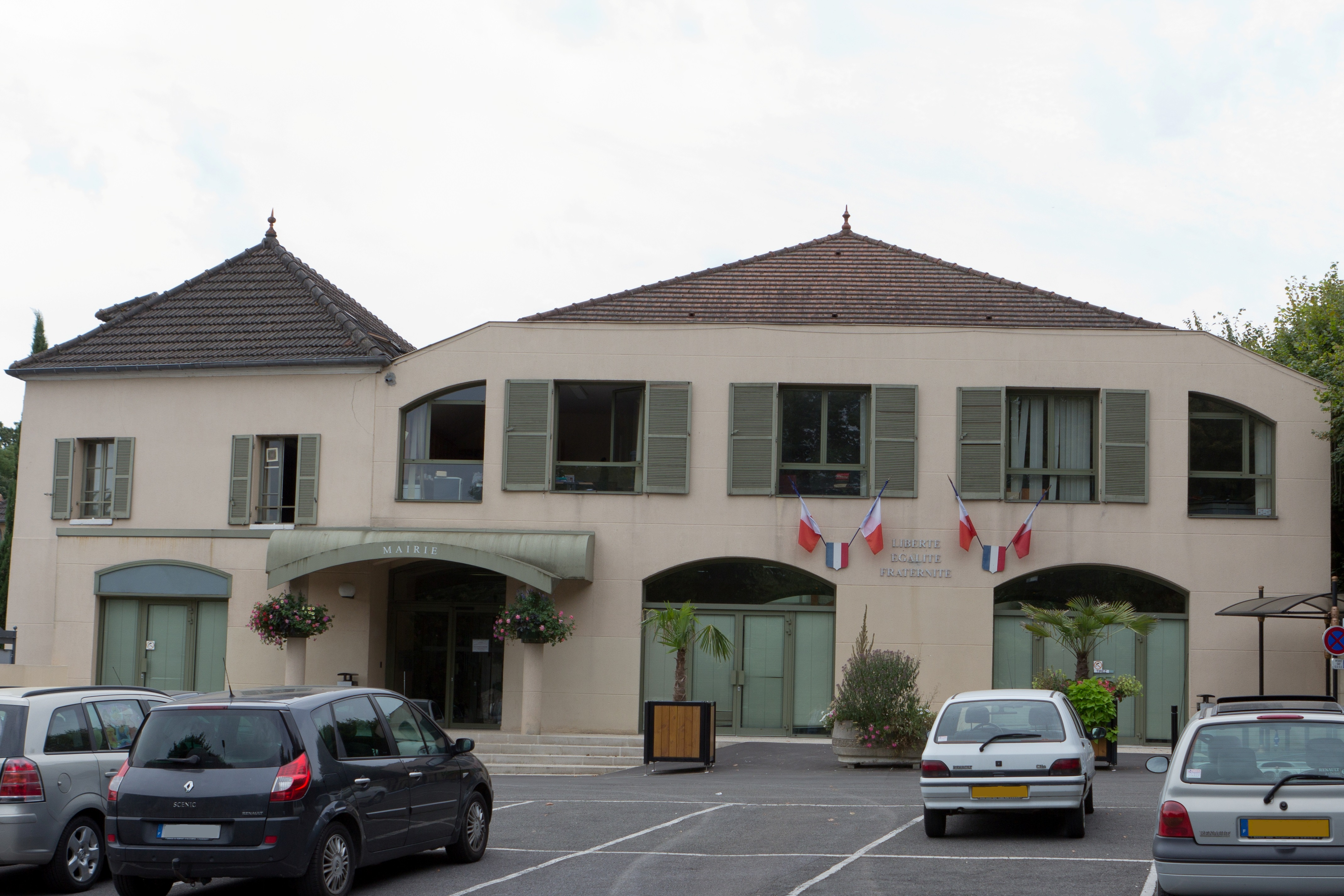
- The town hall of Fleury-Mérogis
- Location of Fleury-Mérogis
- Location within France Location within Île-de-France (region)
- Coordinates: 48°37′48″N 2°21′43″E
- Country: France
- Region: Île-de-France
- Department: Essonne
- Arrondissement: Évry
- Canton: Ris-Orangis
- Intercommunality: CA Cœur d'Essonne

Government
  - Mayor (2020–2026): Olivier Corzani
- Area^{1}: 6.51 km^{2} (2.51 sq mi)
- Elevation: 94 m (308 ft)
- Highest elevation: 101 m (331 ft)
- Lowest elevation: 76 m (249 ft)
- Population (2023): 13,721
  - Density: 2,110/km^{2} (5,460/sq mi)
- Time zone: UTC+01:00 (CET)
  - Summer (DST): UTC+02:00 (CEST)
- INSEE/Postal code: 91235 /91700
- ^{1} French Land Register data, which excludes lakes, ponds, glaciers > 1 km^{2} (0.386 sq mi or 247 acres) and river estuaries.

Fleury-Mérogis (French pronunciation: [flœʁi meʁɔʒis]) is a commune in the Essonne department in northern France, in the southern suburbs of Paris. The commune has the Fleury-Mérogis Prison, France's and Europe's largest prison.

== Population ==
Inhabitants of Fleury-Mérogis are known as Floriacumois in French.

Historical population
Year	Pop.	±% p.a.
1968	1,194	—
1975	6,551	+27.53%
1982	7,419	+1.79%
1990	9,677	+3.38%
1999	9,074	−0.71%
2007	9,141	+0.09%
2012	9,165	+0.05%
2017	12,673	+6.70%
2023	13,721	+1.33%
Source: INSEE

== Education ==
The commune has three groups of preschools (écoles maternelles) and elementary schools: Robert-Desnos, Paul-Langevin, and Joliot-Curie.

== Gallery ==
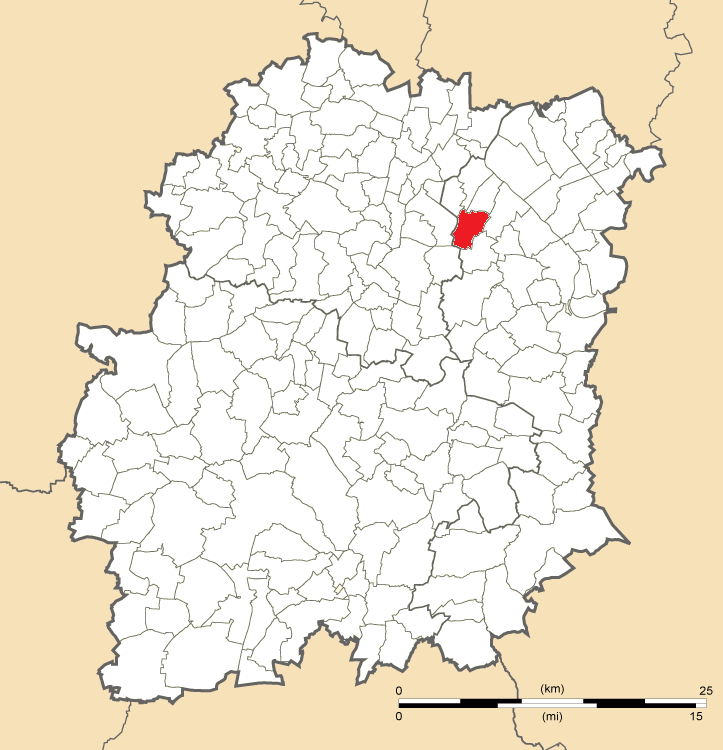
Map indicating Fleury-Mérogis in Essonne

== See also ==
- Communes of the Essonne department
