= Auguste Jubé de La Perelle =

French general, politician and historiography (1765–1824)

- Born: 12 May 1765; Vert-le-Petit
- Died: 1 July 1824 (aged 59); Dourdan (Seine-et-Oise)
- Occupation(s): General; Politician; Historiographer
- Spouse: Félicité Harpe

Auguste Jubé, baron de La Perelle (12 May 1765 – 1 July 1824) was a French general, politician and historiographer.

== Publications ==
- 1794: Couplets-impromptus au brave Marc Tancogne, de la commune d'Agen, soldat au 71e régiment d'infanterie, chantés à la fin du repas que lui ont donné les représentans du peuple, députés du département de Lot-et-Garonne, et leurs amis C. St-C. B... et Aug. J...
- 1797: Détail exact des ceremonies qui auront lieu aujour'hui décadi au Luxembourg pour la réception du général Buonaparte, porteur, de la ratification du Traité de paix qu'il a conclu avec l'empereux: désignation des hymnes qui ont été donnés pour la publication de la paix
- 1800: Couplets patriotiques chantés à l'inauguration du nouveau pavillon national, dans la rade de Cherbourg, le 1er prairial
- Discours prononcé par Aug. Jubé: dans la séance extraordinairement [du] Tribunat convoquée le 4 nivose an 9
- 1800: Observations rapides par Auguste Jubé, contre le projet de loi relative aux Archives nationales: Tribunat. Séance du 11 frimaire an 9
- Aux habitants du district de Cherbourg. 1er entretien patriotique
- 1803: Rapport fait au nom de la section de l'intériour, sur la concession d'un droit de péage pour l'amélioration de la navigation du Tarn: Tribunat. Séance du 16 floréal an 11
- 1805: La Victoire d'Austerlitz, chant de reconnaissance
- 1805: Histoire des guerres des gaulois et des français en Italie: avec le tableau des événemens civils et militaires qui les accompagnèrent, et leur influence sur la civilisation et les progrès de l'esprit humain, Volume 2
- 1805: Histoire des Guerres des Gaulois et des Français en Italie, Volume 5
- 1814: Hommage des Français à l'empereur Alexandre: de la nécessité de transmettre à la postérité le souvenir des bienfaits de l'empereur Alexandre et de ses augustes Alliés, et des moyens de signaler la reconnaissance des Français : [Paris, 3 avril 1814]
- 1816: Lettre à M. le Vte de Châteaubriant... concernant un pamphlet intitulé : "De la Monarchie selon la Charte"...
- 1816: Nouvelle lettre du chevalier de l'union à sm. le vicomte de Chateaubriand, sur sa nouvelle proposition; suivie d'une analyse du Tableau politique de l'Allemagne
- 1817: Des essais de M. Scheffer, sur quatre grandes questions politiques, et particulièrement de son opinion relative aux armées
- 1817: Émile Vadé, petit cousin de Guillaume, à Madame Duchaume, marchande coquetière de Pontoise
- 1817: Encore un Concordat: Notes rapides sur les articles d'une loi proposée pour l'enregistrement et la publication d'un nouveau concordat
- 1818: Quelques mots sur la proclamation de m. le vicomte de Chateaubriand
- 1818: Le Post-Scriptum
- 1818: Lettre d'un Français à lord Stanhope, et réflexions sur l'évènement arrivé à lord Wellington, dans la nuit du 10 au 11 février
- 1818: Le Chansonnier des Graces, Pour 1819: Avec les Airs nouveaux gravés
- 1819: La cour-pléniere des Iles de parlas, ou, M.DCCC. XIXe. chapitre de la vie Pantagruel: morceau d'histoire
- 1820: Le temple de la gloire ou les fastes militaires de la France depuis le règne de Louis XIV jusqu'à nos jours, Volume 1
- 1820: Le temple de la gloire ou les fastes militaires de la France: depuis le règne de Louis XIV jusquá̀ nos jours, Volume 2
- 1820: Le temple de la gloire, ou, Fastes militaires de la France: depuis le règne de Louis XIV jusqu'à nos jours : contenant le récit des principaux faits d'armes, tant sur terre que sur mer
- 1830: Péroraison qui devait être prononcée par l'un des défenseurs du maréchal Ney... en décembre 1815, publiée par la veuve du général Jubé.
- 1835: Histoire des campagnes des Français de 1643 à 1815, par le général Jubé. Nouvelle édition, continuée jusqu'à la fin du règne de Napoléon...

== Sources ==
- "Auguste Jubé de La Perelle", in Adolphe Robert and Gaston Cougny, Dictionnaire des parlementaires français (1789-1891), Bourloton, Paris, 1889 Edition details Wikisource
- Louis Gabriel Michaud, Biographie universelle ancienne et moderne, Volume 21, 1858
