= Paul Lafargue (racing driver) =

French racing driver (born 1988)

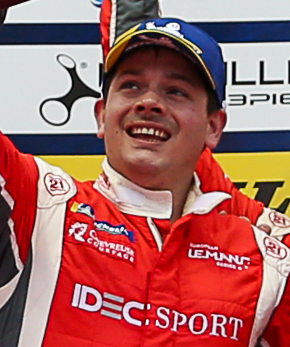
- Lafargue in 2019
- Nationality: French
- Born: 8 July 1988 (age 38)

European Le Mans Series career
- Debut season: 2016
- Current team: IDEC Sport
- Categorisation: FIA Silver (until 2026); FIA Bronze (2027–)
- Starts: 31
- Wins: 1
- Podiums: 5
- Best finish: 1st in 2019

Previous series
- 2013 2016 2017-19,21: International GT Open; Le Mans Cup; 24H Series

Championship titles
- 2019: European Le Mans Series
- Statistics up to date as of 30 March 2022.

Paul Lafargue (born 8 July 1988) is a French racing driver. Having started his car racing career at the relatively late age of 23, Lafargue has been a regular in the European Le Mans Series's LMP2, where he has been competing for his father's team IDEC Sport since 2016.

Lafargue won the 2019 European Le Mans Series alongside Paul-Loup Chatin and Memo Rojas. He has also competed in the International GT Open and the Le Mans Cup, as well as several classic car races.

Lafargue started competing in 2011, driving in the prototype class of the V de V Challenge Endurance in his homeland. Having made a one-off appearance in the series's single-seater category in 2013, Lafargue would take his first race win that year, taking home the 997 class win at the 24 Hours of Barcelona. In 2014, the Frenchman won his first races in the Endurance Challenge, which, alongside four further podiums, earned him and Ruffier Racing the V de V title. He would finish second the following year, racing for the team built by his father on the basis of Ruffier Racing: IDEC Sport. During the same season, he, father Patrice Lafargue, and Gabriel Abergel drove a Porsche 997 GT3 Cup car in the 24H Series, winning three races and the class title.

== Racing record ==
=== Career summary ===
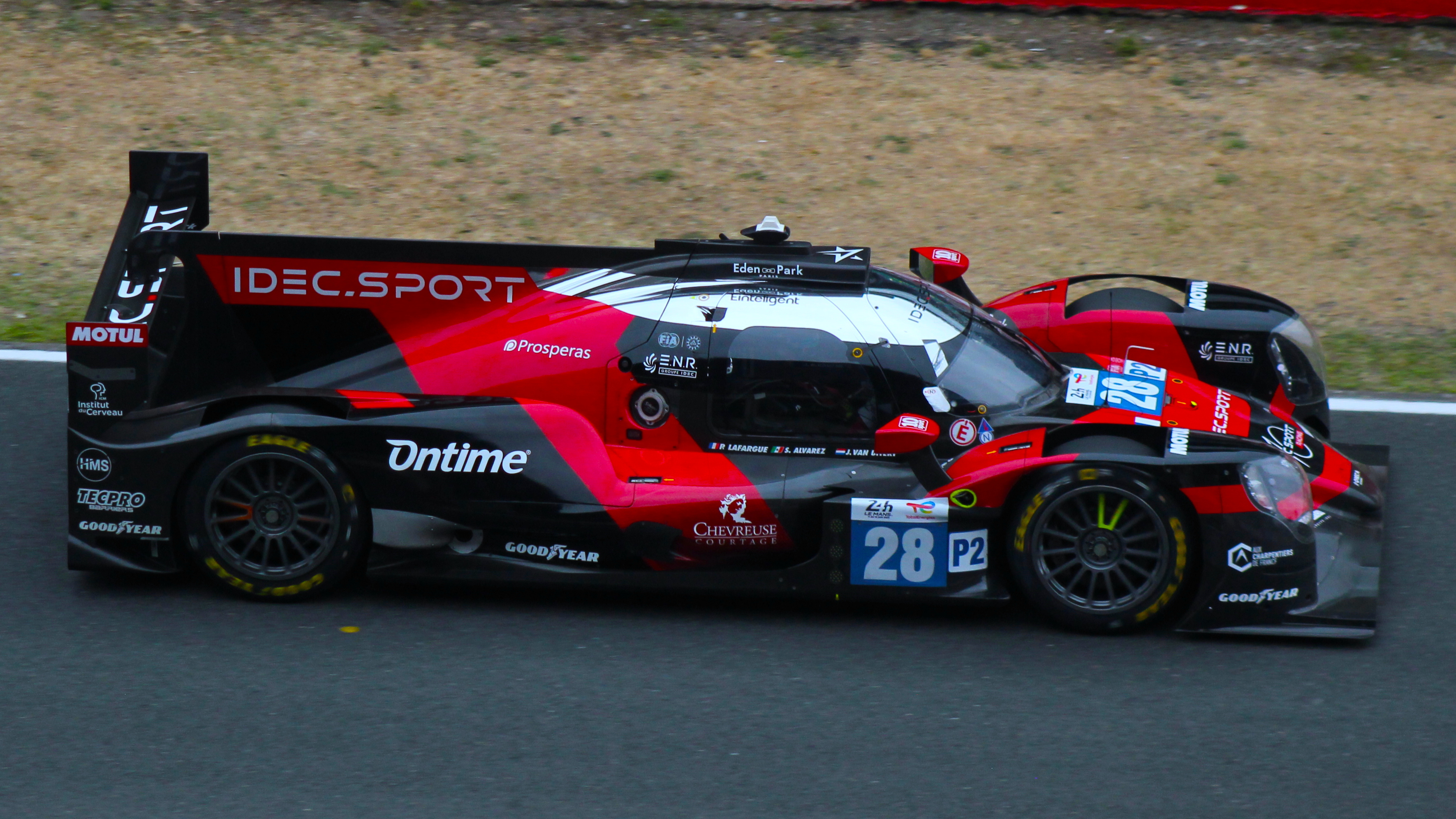
Lafargue's No. 28 car at the 2025 24 Hours of Le Mans

Season	Series	Team	Races	Wins	Poles	F/Laps	Podiums	Points	Position
2011	V de V Challenge Endurance Moderne - Proto	Equipe Palmyr	1	0	0	0	0	1.5	49th
2012	V de V Challenge Endurance Moderne - Proto	Extreme Limite Aric	4	0	0	0	0	15	36th
2013	V de V Challenge Endurance - Proto - Scratch	Chateaux Sport Auto	7	0	0	0	0	59	12th
2013	V de V - Challenge Endurance GT/Tourisme V de V	Ruffier Racing	6	0	0	0	0	48.5	14th
2013	International GT Open - GTS	Ruffier Racing	2	0	0	0	0	0	NC
2013	24 Hours of Barcelona - Class 997	Ruffier Racing	1	1	0	0	1	N/A	**1st**
2013	V de V Challenge Monoplace	Lamo Racing Car	1	0	0	0	0	16	56th
2014	V de V - Challenge Endurance GT/Tourisme V de V	Ruffier Racing	7	2	2	0	6	157	**1st**
2014	V de V Challenge Endurance Proto - Scratch	OAK Racing	7	0	0	0	0	33.5	23rd
2014	Le Mans Classic - Plateau 6		2	0	0	0	0	N/A	60th
2015	V de V - Challenge Endurance GT/Tourisme V de V	IDEC Sport Racing	7	3	0	0	3	149.5	**2nd**
2015	V de V Challenge Endurance Proto - Scratch	IDEC Sport Racing	7	1	0	0	5	138.5	**2nd**
2015	24H Dubai - 997	Ruffier Racing	1	0	0	0	0	N/A	4th
2015	24H Series - 997	Ruffier Racing	4	3	1	0	3	101	**1st**
2016	European Le Mans Series - LMP2	IDEC Sport Racing	5	0	0	0	0	19	18th
2016	V de V Challenge Endurance Moderne - Proto	IDEC Sport Racing	3	0	0	0	0	11	30th
2016	Challenge Endurance GT Tourisme V de V	IDEC Sport Racing	1	1	0	0	1	0	NC†
2016	24H Series - A6	IDEC Sport Racing	5	0	0	0	0	62	7th
2016	Michelin GT3 Le Mans Cup	IDEC Sport Racing	1	0	0	0	0	2	22nd
2017	European Le Mans Series - LMP2	IDEC Sport Racing	6	0	0	0	0	18.5	18th
2017	24 Hours of Le Mans - LMP2	IDEC Sport Racing	1	0	0	0	0	N/A	10th
2017	24H Series - A6	IDEC Sport Racing	6	0	0	0	1	45	21st
2018	European Le Mans Series - LMP2	IDEC Sport	5	0	0	0	2	50	8th
2018	24 Hours of Le Mans - LMP2	IDEC Sport	1	0	0	0	0	N/A	DNF
2018	24H GT Series - European Championship - A6	IDEC Sport	3	0	0	0	1	28	20th
2018	24H GT Series - European Championship - 991	IDEC Sport	1	0	0	0	0	0	NC†
2018	Le Mans Classic - Plateau 6		3	0	0	0	2	N/A	29th
2018	Classic Endurance Racing - Proto 2 (-2 Liter)		1	0	0	1	0	33	13th
2019	European Le Mans Series - LMP2	IDEC Sport	6	2	0	0	4	105	**1st**
2019	24 Hours of Le Mans - LMP2	IDEC Sport	1	0	0	0	0	N/A	5th
2019	24H GT Series - European Championship - A6	IDEC Sport	5	0	0	0	0	30	10th
2019	24H GT Series - Continents'	IDEC Sport	1	0	0	0	0	0	NC
2019	Classic Endurance Racing - Proto 2 (-2 Liter)		2	0	1	0	2	60	5th
2020	European Le Mans Series - LMP2	IDEC Sport	5	0	0	0	0	21	10th
2020	24 Hours of Le Mans - LMP2	IDEC Sport	1	0	0	0	0	N/A	6th
2020	Classic Endurance Proto 2 (-2 Liter) 1972-1984		1	0	0	0	0	5.5	16th
2021	European Le Mans Series - LMP2	IDEC Sport	6	0	0	0	0	32	9th
2021	24 Hours of Le Mans - LMP2	IDEC Sport	1	0	0	0	0	N/A	6th
2021	24H GT Series - GT3 Pro	IDEC Sport	1	1	0	0	1	0	NC†
2022	European Le Mans Series - LMP2	IDEC Sport	6	1	0	0	1	53	6th
2022	24 Hours of Le Mans - LMP2	IDEC Sport	1	0	0	0	0	N/A	8th
2023	European Le Mans Series - LMP2	IDEC Sport	6	0	0	0	2	70	5th
2023	24 Hours of Le Mans - LMP2	IDEC Sport	1	0	0	0	0	N/A	6th
2024	European Le Mans Series - LMP2	IDEC Sport	2	0	0	0	0	25	13th
2024	24 Hours of Le Mans - LMP2	IDEC Sport	1	0	0	0	1	N/A	**3rd**
2025	European Le Mans Series - LMP2	IDEC Sport	6	0	0	0	0	40	8th
2025	24 Hours of Le Mans - LMP2	IDEC Sport	1	0	0	0	0	N/A	DNF
2026	European Le Mans Series - LMP2	IDEC Sport	6	0	0	0	2	35	10th
2026	24 Hours of Le Mans - LMP2	IDEC Sport	1	0	0	0	0	N/A	6th

=== Complete European Le Mans Series results ===
(key) (Races in bold indicate pole position; results in italics indicate fastest lap)

Year	Entrant	Class	Chassis	Engine	1	2	3	4	5	6	Rank	Points
2016	IDEC Sport Racing	LMP2	Ligier JS P2	Nissan VK45DE 4.5 L V8	SIL; 7	IMO; Ret	RBR	LEC; 9	SPA; 8	EST; 6	18th	19
2017	IDEC Sport Racing	LMP2	Ligier JS P217	Gibson GK428 4.2 V8	SIL; 8	MNZ; 9	RBR; Ret	LEC; 11	SPA; 10	ALG; 10	18th	18.5
2018	IDEC Sport	LMP2	Oreca 07	Gibson GK428 4.2 L V8	**LEC**; 7	MNZ; 3	**RBR**; 4	SIL; 3	SPA; 4‡	ALG	8th	50
2019	IDEC Sport	LMP2	Oreca 07	Gibson GK428 4.2 L V8	LEC; 2	MNZ; 2	**CAT**; 5	SIL; 1	SPA; 5	ALG; 1	1st	105
2020	IDEC Sport	LMP2	Oreca 07	Gibson GK428 4.2 L V8	LEC; Ret	SPA; 7	LEC; 7	MNZ; 6	ALG; 10		10th	21
2021	IDEC Sport	LMP2	Oreca 07	Gibson GK428 4.2 L V8	CAT; 8	RBR; 6	LEC; 9	MNZ; 9	SPA; 6	ALG; 7	9th	32
2022	IDEC Sport	LMP2	Oreca 07	Gibson GK428 4.2 L V8	LEC; 4	IMO; 5	MNZ; 1	CAT; 13	SPA; Ret	ALG; 7	6th	53
2023	IDEC Sport	LMP2	Oreca 07	Gibson GK428 4.2 L V8	CAT; 3	LEC; 5	ARA; 2	SPA; 4	POR; 7	**ALG**; 6	5th	70
2024	IDEC Sport	LMP2	Oreca 07	Gibson GK428 4.2 L V8	CAT; 4	**LEC**; 4	IMO	SPA	MUG	ALG	13th	25
2025	IDEC Sport	LMP2	Oreca 07	Gibson GK428 4.2 L V8	CAT; 8	LEC; 11	IMO; Ret	SPA; 4	SIL; 4	ALG; 4	8th	40
2026	IDEC Sport	LMP2	Oreca 07	Gibson GK428 4.2 L V8	CAT; 10	LEC; 3	IMO; 11	SPA; 10	SIL; 2	ALG; Ret	10th	35

=== Complete 24 Hours of Le Mans results ===
Year	Team	Co-Drivers	Car	Class	Laps	Pos.	Class Pos.
2017	(France) IDEC Sport Racing	(France) Patrice Lafargue (France) David Zollinger	Ligier JS P217-Gibson	LMP2	344	12th	10th
2018	(France) IDEC Sport	(France) Paul-Loup Chatin (Mexico) Memo Rojas	Oreca 07-Gibson	LMP2	312	DNF	DNF
2019	(France) IDEC Sport	(France) Paul-Loup Chatin (Mexico) Memo Rojas	Oreca 07-Gibson	LMP2	364	10th	5th
2020	(France) IDEC Sport	(United Kingdom) Richard Bradley (France) Paul-Loup Chatin	Oreca 07-Gibson	LMP2	366	10th	6th
2021	(France) IDEC Sport	(France) Paul-Loup Chatin (France) Patrick Pilet	Oreca 07-Gibson	LMP2	359	11th	6th
2022	(France) IDEC Sport	(France) Paul-Loup Chatin (France) Patrick Pilet	Oreca 07-Gibson	LMP2	366	12th	8th
2023	(France) IDEC Sport	(France) Paul-Loup Chatin (Germany) Laurents Hörr	Oreca 07-Gibson	LMP2	327	14th	6th
2024	(France) IDEC Sport	(France) Reshad de Gerus (Netherlands) Job van Uitert	Oreca 07-Gibson	LMP2	297	17th	**3rd**
2025	(France) IDEC Sport	(Mexico) Sebastián Álvarez (Netherlands) Job van Uitert	Oreca 07-Gibson	LMP2	308	DNF	DNF
2026	(France) IDEC Sport	(Italy) Valerio Rinicella (Netherlands) Job van Uitert	Oreca 07-Gibson	LMP2	359	20th	6th
