= Dourdan =

Commune in Île-de-France, France

- Commune
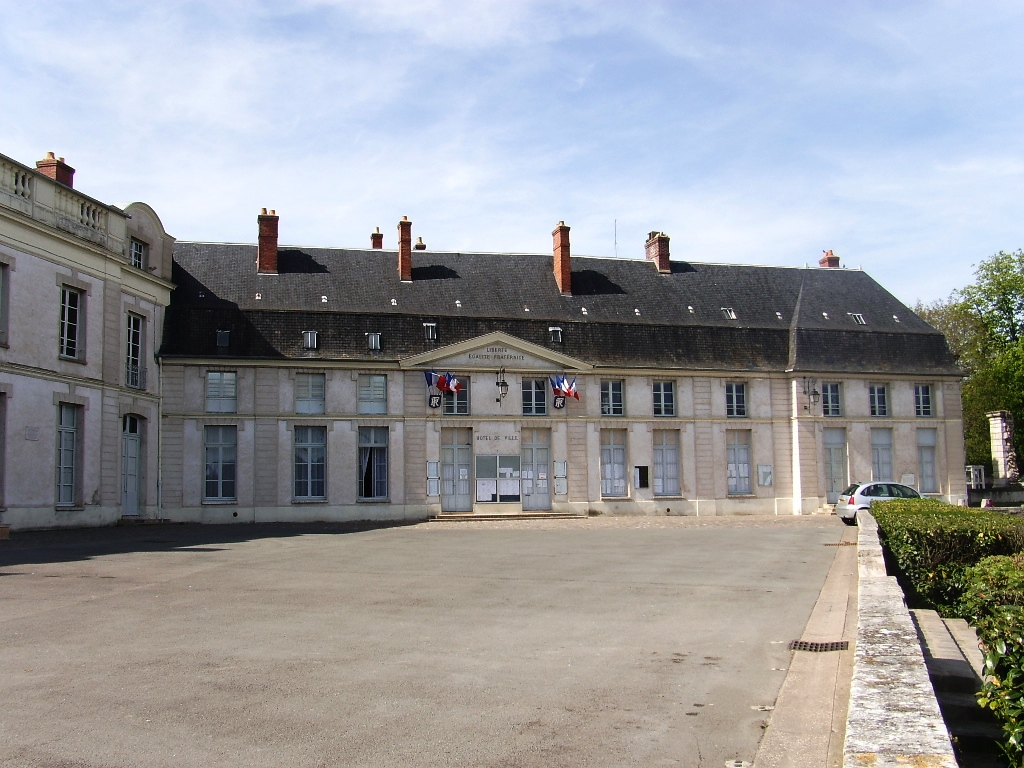
- The town hall of Dourdan

- Coat of arms
- Location of Dourdan
- Location within France Location within Île-de-France (region)
- Coordinates: 48°31′44″N 2°00′56″E
- Country: France
- Region: Île-de-France
- Department: Essonne
- Arrondissement: Étampes
- Canton: Dourdan
- Intercommunality: Le Dourdannais en Hurepoix

Government
  - Mayor (2020–2026): Paolo De Carvalho
- Area^{1}: 30.64 km^{2} (11.83 sq mi)
- Elevation: 95 m (312 ft)
- Highest elevation: 103 m (338 ft)
- Lowest elevation: 87 m (285 ft)
- Population (2023): 11,415
  - Density: 372.6/km^{2} (964.9/sq mi)
- Time zone: UTC+01:00 (CET)
  - Summer (DST): UTC+02:00 (CEST)
- INSEE/Postal code: 91200 /91410
- ^{1} French Land Register data, which excludes lakes, ponds, glaciers > 1 km^{2} (0.386 sq mi or 247 acres) and river estuaries.

Dourdan (French pronunciation: [duʁdɑ̃]) is a commune in the Essonne department in Île-de-France. It is the capital of the historical region of Hurepoix.

It is located in the metropolitan area of Paris.

== Geography ==
Dourdan is located on the river Orge in the western Essonne. The town is surrounded by the Dourdan forest (Forêt de Dourdan).

=== Climate ===
Dourdan has an oceanic climate (Köppen climate classification Cfb). The average annual temperature in Dourdan is 11.4 °C (52.5 °F). The average annual rainfall is 654.2 mm (25.76 in) with May as the wettest month. The temperatures are highest on average in July, at around 19.5 °C (67.1 °F), and lowest in January, at around 4.2 °C (39.6 °F). The highest temperature ever recorded in Dourdan was 41.6 °C (106.9 °F) on 25 July 2019; the coldest temperature ever recorded was −16.2 °C (2.8 °F) on 8 January 2010.

Climate data for Dourdan (1991−2020 normals, extremes 1988−present)
Month	Jan	Feb	Mar	Apr	May	Jun	Jul	Aug	Sep	Oct	Nov	Dec	Year
Record high °C (°F)	16.1 (61.0)	19.8 (67.6)	24.6 (76.3)	28.4 (83.1)	30.7 (87.3)	37.6 (99.7)	41.6 (106.9)	41.4 (106.5)	34.0 (93.2)	28.5 (83.3)	21.5 (70.7)	16.7 (62.1)	41.6 (106.9)
Mean daily maximum °C (°F)	6.9 (44.4)	8.2 (46.8)	12.4 (54.3)	16.0 (60.8)	19.4 (66.9)	23.0 (73.4)	25.7 (78.3)	25.6 (78.1)	21.5 (70.7)	16.4 (61.5)	10.8 (51.4)	7.4 (45.3)	16.1 (61.0)
Daily mean °C (°F)	4.2 (39.6)	4.7 (40.5)	7.8 (46.0)	10.5 (50.9)	13.9 (57.0)	17.2 (63.0)	19.5 (67.1)	19.3 (66.7)	15.9 (60.6)	12.0 (53.6)	7.6 (45.7)	4.7 (40.5)	11.4 (52.5)
Mean daily minimum °C (°F)	1.5 (34.7)	1.2 (34.2)	3.1 (37.6)	4.9 (40.8)	8.3 (46.9)	11.4 (52.5)	13.3 (55.9)	13.1 (55.6)	10.1 (50.2)	7.7 (45.9)	4.4 (39.9)	2.0 (35.6)	6.8 (44.2)
Record low °C (°F)	−16.2 (2.8)	−15.7 (3.7)	−10.5 (13.1)	−4.6 (23.7)	−1.1 (30.0)	1.5 (34.7)	5.0 (41.0)	4.3 (39.7)	0.9 (33.6)	−4.0 (24.8)	−9.2 (15.4)	−10.6 (12.9)	−16.2 (2.8)
Average precipitation mm (inches)	52.3 (2.06)	47.5 (1.87)	50.0 (1.97)	43.9 (1.73)	68.5 (2.70)	53.8 (2.12)	52.0 (2.05)	57.4 (2.26)	47.5 (1.87)	54.9 (2.16)	60.6 (2.39)	65.8 (2.59)	654.2 (25.76)
Average precipitation days (≥ 1.0 mm)	11.0	10.1	9.7	8.8	9.8	8.1	7.3	7.7	7.5	10.2	11.1	12.2	113.5
Source: Météo-France

== History ==
The origin of the name comes credibly from "Dour" derived of the Celtic root "Dor" which means "water" or "river", the same origin as for the English city of Dover. The radical "dan" could have meant "hill". Dourdan (Dordincum) developed during the Gallo-Roman period as an important center of production of ceramics. In the Middle Ages, it became the residence of Hugh the Great, father of Hugh Capet; he died there in 956.

Dourdan became a royal city in 987, when Hugh Capet was crowned king.

In 1220, King Philip II Augustus of France built a new castle; its most famous owners were: Blanche de Castille, Louis d'Évreux, Jean, duc de Berry, François de Lorraine, duc de Guise, Maximilien de Béthune, duc de Sully, Anne of Austria and the House of Orléans.

General Auguste Jubé de La Perelle (1765–1824) died in Dourdan.

== Population ==
Inhabitants of Dourdan are known as Dourdannais in French.

Historical population
Year	Pop.	±% p.a.
1968	5,378	—
1975	7,441	+4.75%
1982	8,057	+1.14%
1990	9,043	+1.45%
1999	9,555	+0.61%
2007	9,435	−0.16%
2012	10,168	+1.51%
2017	10,806	+1.22%
2023	11,415	+0.92%
Source: INSEE

== Transportation ==
Two train and RER stations are located in Dourdan: Dourdan and Dourdan-la-Forêt, terminus of one of the branches of the RER C line.

The Dourdan SNCF station is on the line going from Paris Gare d'Austerlitz to Vendôme and Châteaudun.

Both stations allow passengers to go to Paris and Versailles, with trains leaving every 30 minutes during the day and every 15 minutes during rush hour.

An express bus line connects Dourdan to Massy and Orsay using A10 highway every 5 minutes during rush hour and every hour during the day.

== Main sights ==
=== Saint-Germain-d'Auxerre Church ===
Construction of the church began in 1150 and was completed by the end of the 12th century. In 1428, during the Hundred Years' War, its upper part was badly damaged by the troops of the Earl of Salisbury, and it was not restored before the end of the 15th century. It was again damaged by the Huguenots during the Wars of Religion (1562–1598). In 1641, the asymmetric spires were constructed and, in 1689, the chapel dedicated to the Virgin Mary (chapelle de la Vierge) was built, increasing the length of the building from 36 to 50 metres. During the French Revolution of 1789, the church was again damaged. It was turned into a Temple of Reason (Temple de la Raison victorieuse), and also a prison until 1795.

=== Castle ===
Built at the request of Philip II Augustus at the beginning of the 13th century in the place of a wooden fortress, it is characteristic of the military architecture of this period. The castle is built on a square pattern, with towers at three of the corners and an isolated donjon at the fourth. The walls are punctuated by towers in the middle of each side, and two, on the east side, flank the gate. A deep stone-lined dry moat follows the outline of the castle. The donjon, the major defensive component of the castle, measures approximately 30 metres in height and 13.6 metres in diameter. It is the typical of the donjons being built by Philip Augustus at this time (e.g. Rouen), and by French nobility through the 13th century.

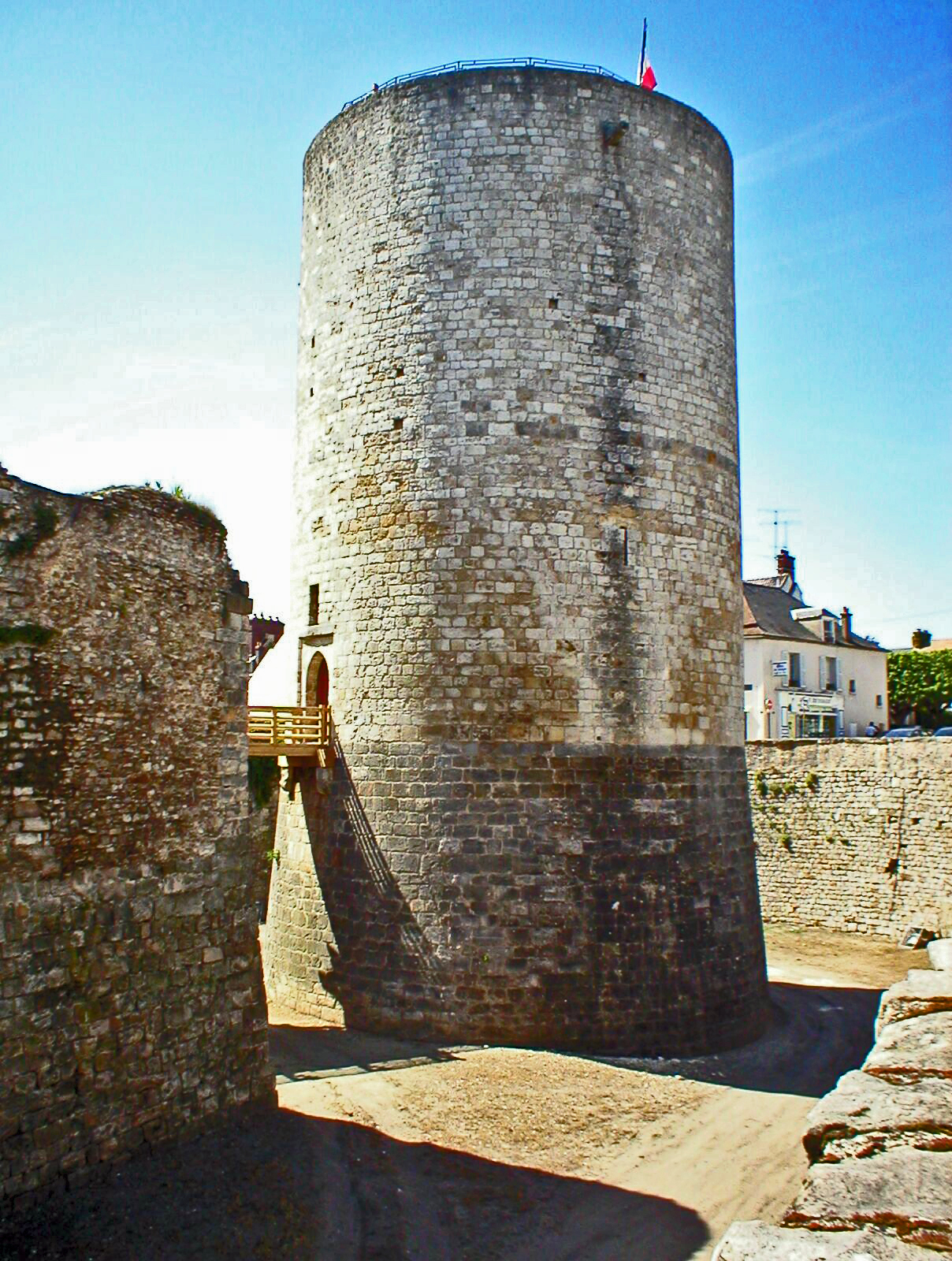
The donjon separated from the castle by its own ditch

The conception of the geometric pattern and isolated donjon was similar to that of the castle of the Louvre. A near identical castle is found at Seringes-et-Nesles, Aisne.

The castle became the property of Jean de Berry in 1385. There was a siege during the French Wars of Religion, stables were built in this period. Some figures who spent some time there include Jeanne II, Countess of Burgundy, and La Hire, friend of Joan of Arc.

The donjon was still a royal prison during the 17th century. There is a museum of local history.

=== The market hall ===
It was built in 1836 and is located in the downtown. It replaced the former hall from the thirteenth century. There is a floor to remind the former hall. The architect was Lucien-Tirte van Clemputte.

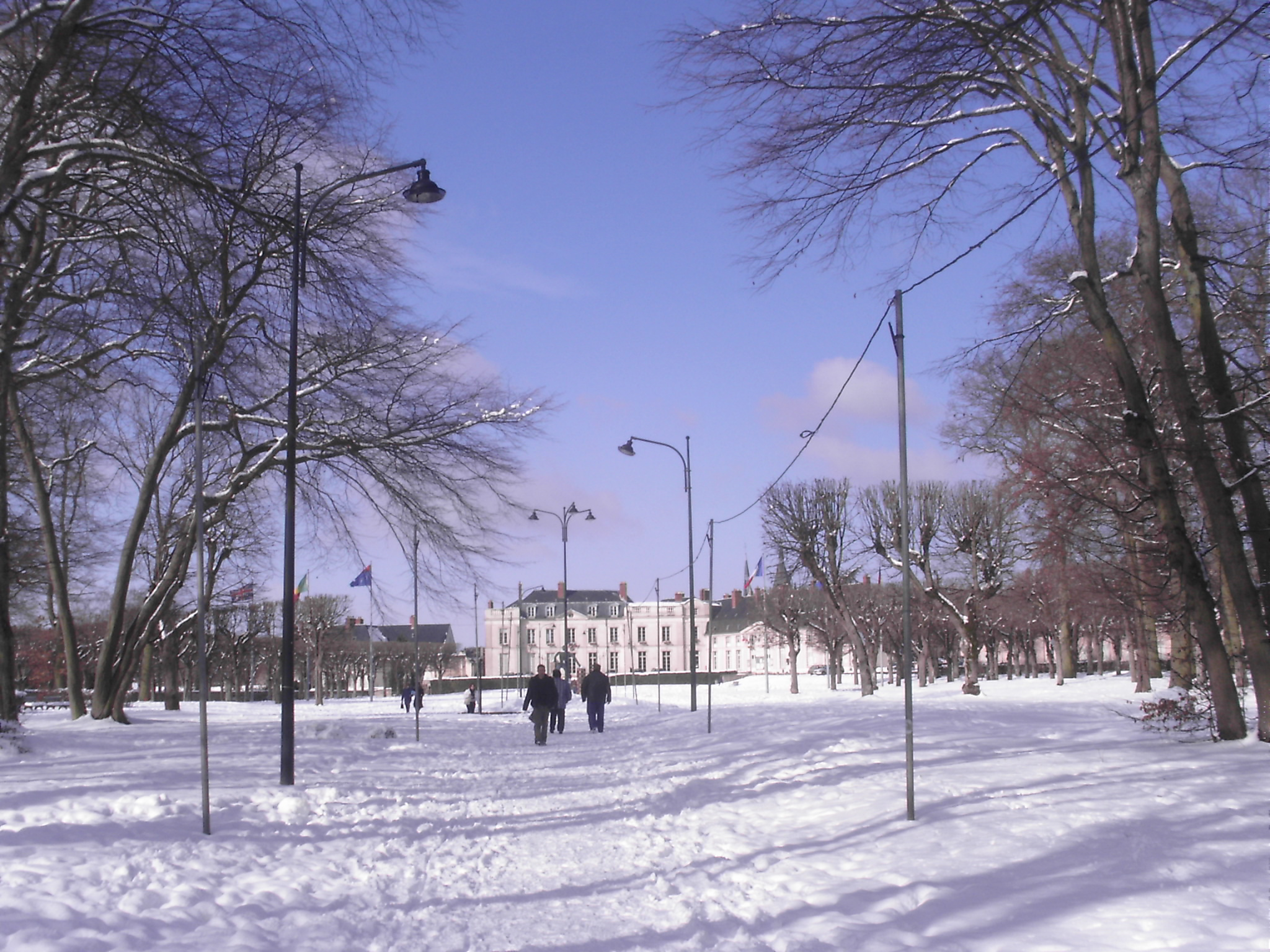
Townhall in front of François Mitterrand park.

== Around Dourdan ==
=== The Royal forest of Dourdan ===
This is an old Royal forest where the kings of France used to hunt, covering a surface of 17 square kilometres. The forest is divided in 2 by the Orge river. The northern part is called forest of Saint-Arnoult while the southern part is the Ouÿe Forest (the name comes from a nearby abbey).

== Education ==
Primary schools in Dourdan:

- École maternelle Les Alliés
- École maternelle Jean-François Regnard
- École élémentaire Georges Leplâtre
- École élémentaire Jean-François Regnard
- École élémentaire Charles Péguy

There is a high school, Lycée Alfred Kastler. (which has fused with another named lycée Francisque Sarcey in 2017 to create the high school "lycée polyvalent Nikola tesla")

== Twin towns ==
Dourdan has five twin towns:

- Bad Wiessee, Germany, since 1963
- Tourougoumbé, Mali, since 1988
- Lac-Megantic, Quebec, Canada, since 1989
- Great Dunmow, United Kingdom, since 1991
- Montserrat, Spain, since 2013

== See also ==
- Communes of the Essonne department
