= 2016 6 Hours of Spa-Francorchamps =

Motor race

Coordinates: 50°26′14″N 5°58′17″E

(Belgium) 2016 WEC 6 Hours of Spa-Francorchamps
Event information
- Round 2 of 8 in the 2016 FIA World Endurance Championship
- Date: 7 May 2016
- Location: Stavelot
- Venue: Circuit de Spa-Francorchamps
- Duration: 6 Hours

Results
- Laps completed: 160
- Distance (km): 1120.64
- Distance (miles): 696.32
- LMP1

Pole position
- Time: 1:55.793
- Team: (Germany) Porsche Team
- Drivers: (Germany) Timo Bernhard (New Zealand) Brendon Hartley

Winners
- Team: (Germany) Audi Sport Team Joest
- Drivers: (France) Loïc Duval (Brazil) Lucas di Grassi (United Kingdom) Oliver Jarvis
- LMP2

Winners
- Team: (France) Signatech Alpine
- Drivers: (France) Nicolas Lapierre (United States) Gustavo Menezes (Monaco) Stéphane Richelmi
- LMGTE Pro

Winners
- Team: (Italy) AF Corse
- Drivers: (United Kingdom) Sam Bird (Italy) Davide Rigon
- LMGTE Am

Winners
- Team: (United Kingdom) Aston Martin Racing
- Drivers: (Canada) Paul Dalla Lana (Portugal) Pedro Lamy (Austria) Mathias Lauda

The 2016 WEC 6 Hours of Spa-Francorchamps, formally the WEC 6 Heures de Spa-Francorchamps, was a six-hour endurance car racing event held for Le Mans Prototype and Le Mans Grand Touring Endurance cars at the Circuit de Spa-Francorchamps, Stavelot, Belgium, on 5–7 May 2016. Spa-Francorchamps served as the second race of the 2016 FIA World Endurance Championship, and was the fifth running of the event as part of the championship. A total of 56,000 people attended the race.

The No. 1 Porsche of Timo Bernhard, Mark Webber and Brendon Hartley started from pole position and held the race's overall lead until the No. 5 Toyota TS050 Hybrid of Sébastien Buemi, Anthony Davidson and Kazuki Nakajima gained it after the first pit stop phase after electing not to change tyres. He held it until smoke billowed from his engine, causing him to return to his garage for repairs. Audi's No. 8 car of Oliver Jarvis, Lucas di Grassi and Loïc Duval inherited the lead which they maintained for the remainder of the race to secure the team's first victory of the season. Porsche's first car, driven by the eventual Drivers' Champions, Romain Dumas, Neel Jani and Marc Lieb finished second, and the No. 13 Rebellion Racing car of Dominik Kraihamer, Alexandre Imperatori and Mathéo Tuscher came in third. It was Jarvis's and di Grassi's first victory in the FIA World Endurance Championship.

The Le Mans Prototype 2 (LMP2) category was won by the Signatech Alpine driven by Nicolas Lapierre, Gustavo Menezes and Stéphane Richelmi. Lapierre took the lead in the closing stages of the race after passing No. 31 Extreme Speed Motorsports driver Pipo Derani which earned Menezes and Richelmi their first LMP2 class victories in the World Endurance Championship. Sam Bird and Davide Rigon in the No. 71 AF Corse Ferrari took the victory in the Le Mans Grand Tourer Endurance Professional (LMGTE Pro) class with a one-lap advantage over second-placed No. 67 Ford Chip Ganassi Team drivers Andy Priaulx, Marino Franchitti and Harry Tincknell. The Le Mans Grand Tourer Endurance Amateur (LMGTE Am) category was led for most of the final hour by the No. 98 Aston Martin of Pedro Lamy, Paul Dalla Lana and Mathias Lauda and held it to clinch victory in the class, ahead of the No. 83 AF Corse Ferrari driven by François Perrodo, Emmanuel Collard and Rui Águas.

The result meant Marc Lieb, Neel Jani and Romain Dumas maintained their Drivers' Championship lead with 43 points, 15 ahead of third-place finishers Kraihamer, Imperatori and Tuscher, and a further point in front of race winners Duval, di Grassi and Jarvis. Nick Heidfeld, Nico Prost and Nelson Piquet Jr. retained fourth place and Kamui Kobayashi, Mike Conway and Stéphane Sarrazin rounded out the top five. Porsche increased its lead in the Manufacturers' Championship on 56 points, 13 in front of their nearest rival Toyota in second, and a further two ahead of Audi with seven races left in the season.

== Entrants ==
A total of 34 cars were officially entered for the 6 Hours of Spa-Francorchamps, with the bulk of the entries in Le Mans Prototype 1 (LMP1) and Le Mans Prototype 2 (LMP2). The 2015 race winners, Audi Team Joest Racing, returned to defend their title. Three manufacturers were represented in LMP1, including a pair of cars entered by Porsche, Toyota and Audi who all elected not to included a third car at this year's race. Rebellion Racing and ByKolles Racing were the two representatives of the LMP1 privateer teams. David Markozov returned to drive the No. 27 SMP Racing BR Engineering BR01 car after he was prevented from taking part at Silverstone because of family problems. LMP2 consisted of 12 cars with 36 drivers in five different types of chassis with one additional Gibson 015S from G-Drive Racing who fielded the 4 Hours of Silverstone winners Giedo van der Garde, Simon Dolan and were joined by GP3 Series driver Jake Dennis.

The Le Mans Grand Touring Endurance Professional (LMGTE Pro) field consisted of three manufacturers (Aston Martin, Ford, and Ferrari) with one change of driver: Jonny Adam, who missed the opening race because he was participating in the British GT Championship, returned to the World Endurance Championship to Aston Martin Racing while the Le Mans Grand Touring Endurance Amateur (LMGTE Am) entrants consisted of six teams: Aston Martin Racing, AF Corse, KCMG, Larbre Compétition, Abu Dhabi Proton Racing and Gulf Racing. Patrick Long made his first start of the year in the championship alongside Khaled Al Qubaisi and David Heinemeier Hansson in Abu Dhabi Proton Racing's No. 88 Porsche 911 RSR after missing the first round because of commitments to other motor racing series.

== Background ==
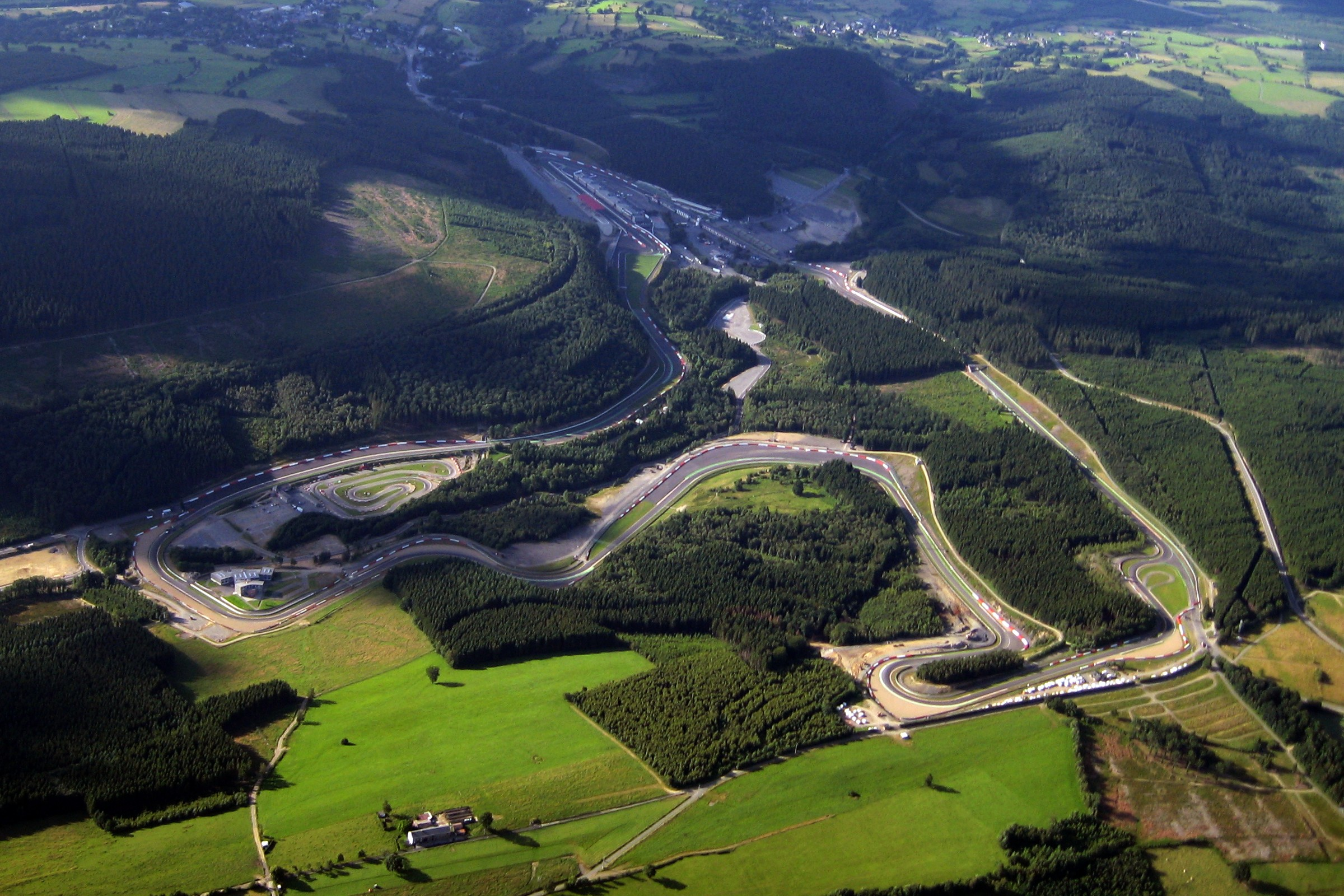
Circuit de Spa-Francorchamps, where the race was held.

The 6 Hours of Spa-Francorchamps was confirmed as part of the FIA World Endurance Championship's 2016 schedule in December 2015 at a meeting of the FIA World Motor Sport Council in Paris. It was the second of nine scheduled endurance sports car rounds of the 2016 FIA World Endurance Championship, and the fifth running of the event as part of the championship. The race was held on 7 May 2016 at the 20-turn 7.004 km (4.352 mi) Circuit de Spa-Francorchamps in Stavelot, Belgium with two preceding days of practice and qualifying.

Endurance racing events were first held at the Circuit de Spa-Francorchamps in 1924 with the Spa 24 Hours. 39 years later, the track began holding 500 km (310 mi) World Sportscar Championship races which later expanded to 1,000 km (620 mi). It was cancelled after the 1975 running because of modern safety concerns. It was resurrected in 1982 on the reconfigured Spa-Francorchamps track layout and remained on the calendar until 1990. Spa-Francorchamps again began holding endurance sports car races from 1999 and the 6 Hour event was made part of the FIA World Endurance Championship in 2012. The race is considered by many as a final preparation event for the 24 Hours of Le Mans.

Before the race Porsche drivers Marc Lieb, Neel Jani and Romain Dumas led the Drivers' Championship with 25 points each, seven points ahead of their nearest rivals Kamui Kobayashi, Mike Conway and Stéphane Sarrazin, and a further three in front of third-placed Dominik Kraihamer, Alexandre Imperatori and Mathéo Tuscher. Nick Heidfeld, Nico Prost and Nelson Piquet Jr. were fourth on twelve points, and Bruno Senna, Filipe Albuquerque and Ricardo González rounded out the top five with ten points. Toyota were leading the Manufacturers' Championship with 33 points, eight ahead of their rival Porsche in second; the third-placed manufacturer Audi had scored one point. Porsche had won the preceding event, the 6 Hours of Silverstone, after the No. 7 Audi car was disqualified when it was discovered that its front skid block was worn out by more than the amount permitted in the sport's technical regulations.

After being unable to win the previous running of the 6 Hours of Spa-Francorchamps, Dumas said that Porsche had to be focused, remain calm, and ensure the team did not make any mistakes. Brendon Hartley, driving the No. 1 Porsche 919 Hybrid, said he was looking forward to racing the circuit because it is one of his favourite tracks and spoke of his feeling it would be a good race for him and his teammates. He also stated that he felt that his defence of the World Drivers' Championship would be revived at the track following his disqualification from the Silverstone event. Toyota No. 5 car co-driver Anthony Davidson said that the race would give them an indication of the segments that needed focus on before heading to Le Mans and was looking forward to competing at Spa-Francorchamps. Having missed the previous year's running of the event due to injury, Kazuki Nakajima was pleased to return to the circuit and spoke of his belief that the race would be better than Silverstone.

Due to the configuration of the Circuit de Spa-Francorchamps, with its high average speed and abundance of elevation change, the teams all set up their cars to produce the maximum amount of downforce possible and to have the least amount of drag available. Toyota, however, opted to use a high-downforce specification which gave them have an advantage in the track's second sector. The teams tested the aerodynamic changes in a two-day testing session at the MotorLand Aragón in April where they learned more about the package and better understood how they operated. Aston Martin were allowed to decrease the minimum weight of their cars by 20 kilograms (44 lb), making it the lightest vehicle in LMGTE Pro, and Ford Chip Ganassi Team were granted permission to increase their refuelling restrictor by 4.5 millimetres (0.18 in) which allowed for faster refuelling pit stops.

== Practice ==
There were three practice sessions—one 90-minute session each on Thursday afternoon and evening and a single one-hour session on Friday afternoon—preceding Saturday's race. The first session was held in sunny weather conditions. The No. 1 Porsche 919 Hybrid driven by Hartley led the 90-minute period through its mid-way point with the fastest lap time of the day, at 1:58.012, almost six-tenths of a second ahead of teammate Jani in second. Audi's second R18 was twice shown a black and orange flag because of a lack of telemetry for which the team was given a €1,000 suspended fine for the remainder of the race weekend and were required to change the vehicle's battery. LMP2 was led by Pipo Derani's No. 31 Extreme Speed Motorsports Oreca with a lap of 2:08.974 which was recorded within the session's first 15 minutes. Adam's No. 97 Aston Martin was quickest in the LMGTE Pro while Pedro Lamy helped the British manufacturer to be fastest in LMGTE Am.

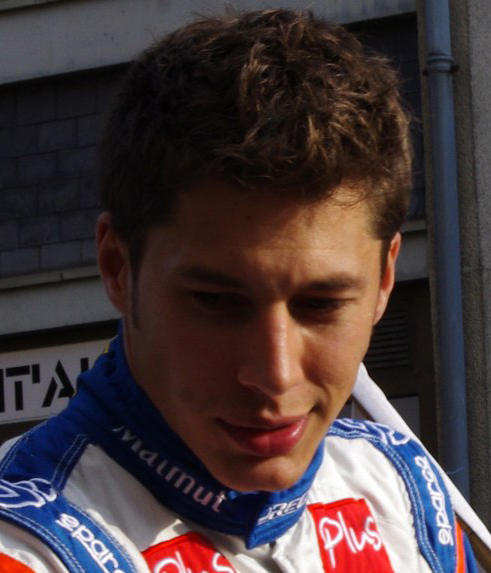
Loïc Duval (pictured in 2011) damaged his car in a third practice session collision.

In the second practice session, which took place in cooler weather conditions, Sarrazin in the No. 6 Toyota, was fastest with a time of 1:58.566, which was set early in the 90-minute period. His teammate Nakajima finished with the second-quickest time, with Mark Webber in the No. 1 Porsche ending up third-fastest. The second Audi vehicle did not take part because their mechanics were unable to repair a failed front axle drivetrain. Roberto Merhi achieved the only time under the 2:08 mark in LMP2 in the No. 45 Manor Oreca with a lap of 2:07.865, eight-tenths of a second faster than the second G-Drive car of van der Garde. LMGTE Pro was led by James Calado in the No. 51 AF Corse Ferrari with the Italian marque setting the fastest time in the LMGTE Am with Rui Águas driving the No. 83 vehicle. The session ended prematurely with seven minutes remaining when Yutaka Yamagishi in Larbre Compétition's No. 50 Chevrolet was reported to have dropped fuel on the track and then collided with the barriers at Stavelot corner.

The final practice session occurred in sunny weather conditions. Timo Bernhard set the fastest timed lap of the weekend so far at 1:56.456 in the No. 1 Porsche, 1.6 seconds faster than the second quickest car of teammate Jani. Loïc Duval made contact with Christian Ried's No. 78 Proton Porsche 911 RSR driving into the Bus Stop chicane in the session's halfway period, damaging his vehicle's front-left quarter, but managed to return to his garage where it remained until the end of practice for repairs to its bodywork. René Rast was the fastest LMP2 driver in the No. 26 G-Drive Oreca with a time of 2:07.341, four-tenths of a second quicker than Nelson Panciatici's No. 35 Signatech Alpine Oreca. Gianmaria Bruni recorded the quickest LMGTE Pro time ahead of AF Corse teammate Davide Rigon while Paolo Ruberti, driving the No. 50 Larbre Competition Chevrolet, was the fastest driver in LMGTE Am.

== Qualifying ==
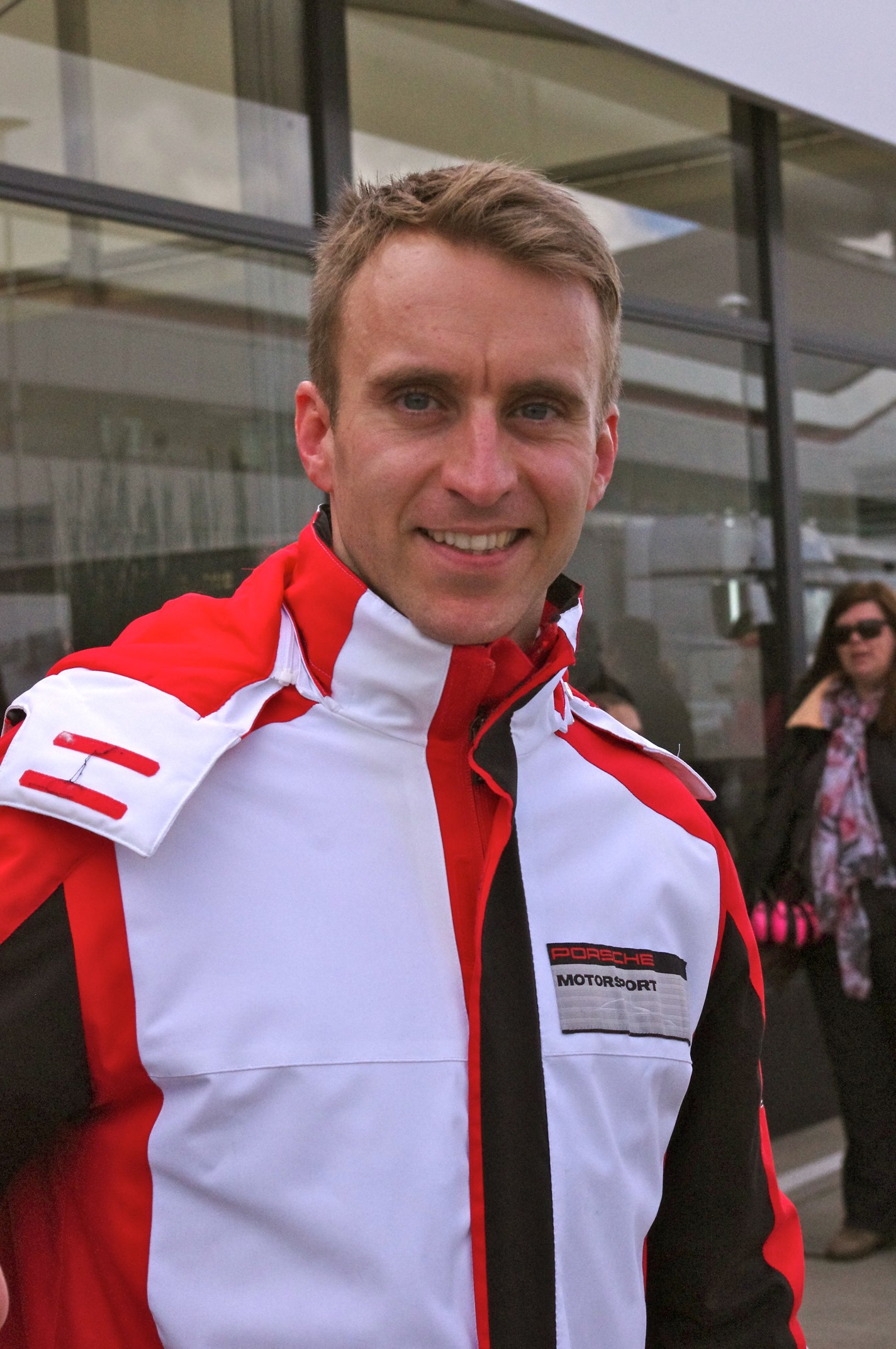
Timo Bernhard (pictured in 2014) clinched Porsche's first pole position of the season.

Friday's late afternoon qualification session was divided into two groups that lasted 25 minutes each. Cars in LMGTE Pro and Am were sent out first and, after a five-minute interval, LMP1 and LMP2 vehicles drove onto the track. All vehicles were required to be driven by two participants for one timed lap each and the starting order was determined by the competitor's fastest average times. The fastest qualifier was awarded one point which went towards the Drivers' and Manufacturers' Championships. Qualifying took place in sunny weather conditions. Porsche led the time sheets early on with a flying lap from Hartley in the No. 1 entry before Bernhard improved it to clinch the team's first pole position of the season with an average time of 1:55.793. This was Hartley's, Bernhard's and Webber's seventh of their careers, and the 13th for the manufacturer. They were joined on the grid's front row by teammates Jani and Lieb who were nearly eight-tenths of a second off Bernhard and Hartley's pace. It marked the first time that Porsche began a World Endurance Championship on the grid's front row since the 2015 6 Hours of Bahrain. Lieb was not happy with his fastest lap because he braked early and could not find a rhythm he liked.

Further down the field, there was an intense battle between Audi and Toyota for positions three to six. Audi struggled to find an optimum set-up for their cars as they secured fourth and sixth positions. They were separated by the two Toyota vehicles in third and fifth places. André Lotterer was slowed by another car on the start of his first timed lap and was affected by oversteer on his second lap of the circuit. Marcel Fässler took over the No. 7 Audi entry from Lotterer and abandoned his first attempt because his vehicle's rear-end became excessively light and later lost downforce behind two cars in Blanchimont corner which restricted the car to starting sixth. The two Rebellion Racing cars and the No. 4 ByKolles Racing CLM P1/01 rounded out the LMP1 qualifiers. Qualifying was stopped for ten minutes when the ByKolles car collided with the No. 43 Manor entry at La Source and debris coming from the former's rear bodywork littered the track at Radallion corner.

In LMP2, the No. 26 G-Drive Oreca car of Rast and Roman Rusinov took the fastest time at 2:07.363, which was set towards the end of qualifying and was a new class record at the track. The two were half a second quicker than the second-place class qualifier, the No. 36 Singatech Alpine vehicle. Merhi held the category lead early in the session with a lap of 2:07.920 but his co-driver Matt Rao was unable to match the latter's time and was the third fastest qualifier, ahead of G-Drive's No. 38 entry in fourth. Sam Bird and Rigon, competing in the No. 71 AF Corse entry, were the fastest LMGTE Pro qualifiers with a two-lap average lap time of 2:17.644. Bruni, in the second AF Corse vehicle, improved late in qualifying, pushing Aston Martin's No. 97 car down to third, and the two Ford Chip Ganassi Team entries rounded out the top five class qualifiers. The No. 98 Aston Martin of Paul Dalla Lana and Lamy took the pole position in LMGTE Am, 1.8 seconds ahead of second-place qualifier, AF Corse's No. 81 car.

=== Post-qualifying ===
The stewards reprimanded six drivers for their slow reaction to the red flag, while the fastest laps from the No. 50 Larbre Compétition Chevrolet, the No. 78 KCMG Porsche, and No. 88 Abu-Dhabi Proton Racing entry were disallowed because the drivers were adjudged to have exceeded track limits. The ruling meant the Gulf Racing's No. 86 car moved from sixth to fourth in LMGTE Am. The No. 51 AF Corse entry, and Ford Chip Ganassi Team's No. 66 car, failed their post-qualifying checks when it was discovered that the vehicles were able to start their engines with and without their fuel couplings engaged; they were allowed to start the race. Michael Christensen, one of two drivers of the No. 77 Dempsey Proton Porsche, failed to reach the 107 per cent mark of the fastest qualifying time in LMGTE Pro and was prohibited from starting the event. He was however allowed to partake in the rest of the race. The ruling meant the car's second driver Richard Lietz took over Christensen's starting duties.

=== Qualifying results ===
Pole position winners in each class are indicated in bold.

Final qualifying classification
Pos	Class	Team	Average Time	Gap	Grid
1	**LMP1**	**No. 1 Porsche Team**	**1:55.793**		**1**
2	LMP1	No. 2 Porsche Team	1:56.590	+0.797	2
3	LMP1	No. 6 Toyota Racing	1:57.698	+1.905	3
4	LMP1	No. 8 Audi Sport Team Joest	1:57.716	+1.923	4
5	LMP1	No. 5 Toyota Racing	1:57.750	+1.957	5
6	LMP1	No. 7 Audi Sport Team Joest	1:57.915	+2.122	6
7	LMP1	No. 13 Rebellion Racing	2:01.547	+5.754	7
8	LMP1	No. 12 Rebellion Racing	2:02.126	+6.333	8
9	LMP1	No. 4 ByKolles Racing Team	2:03.571	+7.778	9
10	**LMP2**	**No. 26 G-Drive Racing**	**2:07.363**	**+11.570**	**10**
11	LMP2	No. 36 Signatech Alpine	2:07.822	+12.029	11
12	LMP2	No. 45 Manor	2:08.336	+12.243	12
13	LMP2	No. 38 G-Drive Racing	2:08.557	+12.764	13
14	LMP2	No. 44 Manor	2:08.893	+13.100	14
15	LMP2	No. 43 RGR Sport by Morand	2:09.125	+13.332	15
16	LMP2	No. 37 SMP Racing	2:09.445	+13.652	16
17	LMP2	No. 31 Extreme Speed Motorsports	2:09.601	+13.808	17
18	LMP2	No. 27 SMP Racing	2:09.625	+13.832	18
19	LMP2	No. 35 Baxi DC Racing Alpine	2:10.230	+14.437	19
20	LMP2	No. 42 Strakka Racing	2:11.160	+15.367	20
21	LMP2	No. 30 Extreme Speed Motorsports	2:13.708	+17.915	21
22	**LMGTE Pro**	**No. 71 AF Corse**	**2:17.644**	**+21.851**	**22**
23	LMGTE Pro	No. 51 AF Corse	2:17.961	+22.168	23
24	LMGTE Pro	No. 97 Aston Martin Racing	2:17.987	+22.194	24
25	LMGTE Pro	No. 66 Ford Chip Ganassi Team UK	2:18.380	+22.587	25
26	LMGTE Pro	No. 67 Ford Chip Ganassi Team UK	2:18.418	+22.625	26
27	LMGTE Pro	No. 95 Aston Martin Racing	2:18.739	+22.946	27
28	LMGTE Pro	No. 77 Dempsey-Proton Racing	2:20.036	+24.243	28
29	**LMGTE Am**	**No. 98 Aston Martin Racing**	**2:20.351**	**+24.558**	**29**
30	LMGTE Am	No. 83 AF Corse	2:22.202	+26.409	30
31	LMGTE Am	No. 88 Abu Dhabi-Proton Racing	2:22.457	+26.664	31
32	LMGTE Am	No. 86 Gulf Racing	2:22.928	+27.135	32
33	LMGTE Am	No. 78 KCMG	2:23.316	+27.523	33
34	LMGTE Am	No. 50 Larbre Compétition	2:23.590	+27.797	34

== Race ==
Weather conditions were dry and sunny at the start of the race. The air temperature throughout the race ranged from 20 to 24.5 °C (68.0 to 76.1 °F) with the track temperature between 24 and 52 °C (75 and 126 °F). 56,000 people attended the event. The race began at 14:30 Central European Summer Time (UTC+02:00). Hartley maintained his pole position advantage heading into the first corner. After starting fourth, the No. 8 Audi moved to third while the team's second car went from sixth to fourth driving up to Les Combes corner. Hartley began to pull away from the rest of the field. Merhi spun his car leaving the first turn but his teammate Will Stevens overtook Nicolas Lapierre for second position in LMP2. The No. 7 Audi went wide at La Source but narrowly maintained fourth place. In LMGTE Pro, Bruni passed teammate Bird to claim the lead on the first lap. Vitaly Petrov's right-rear tyre was punctured following contact with another car on the first lap, causing him to make an unscheduled pit stop where his vehicle's floor and bodywork was changed. Derani and Panciatici made contact at Les Combes but both continued without any major damage.

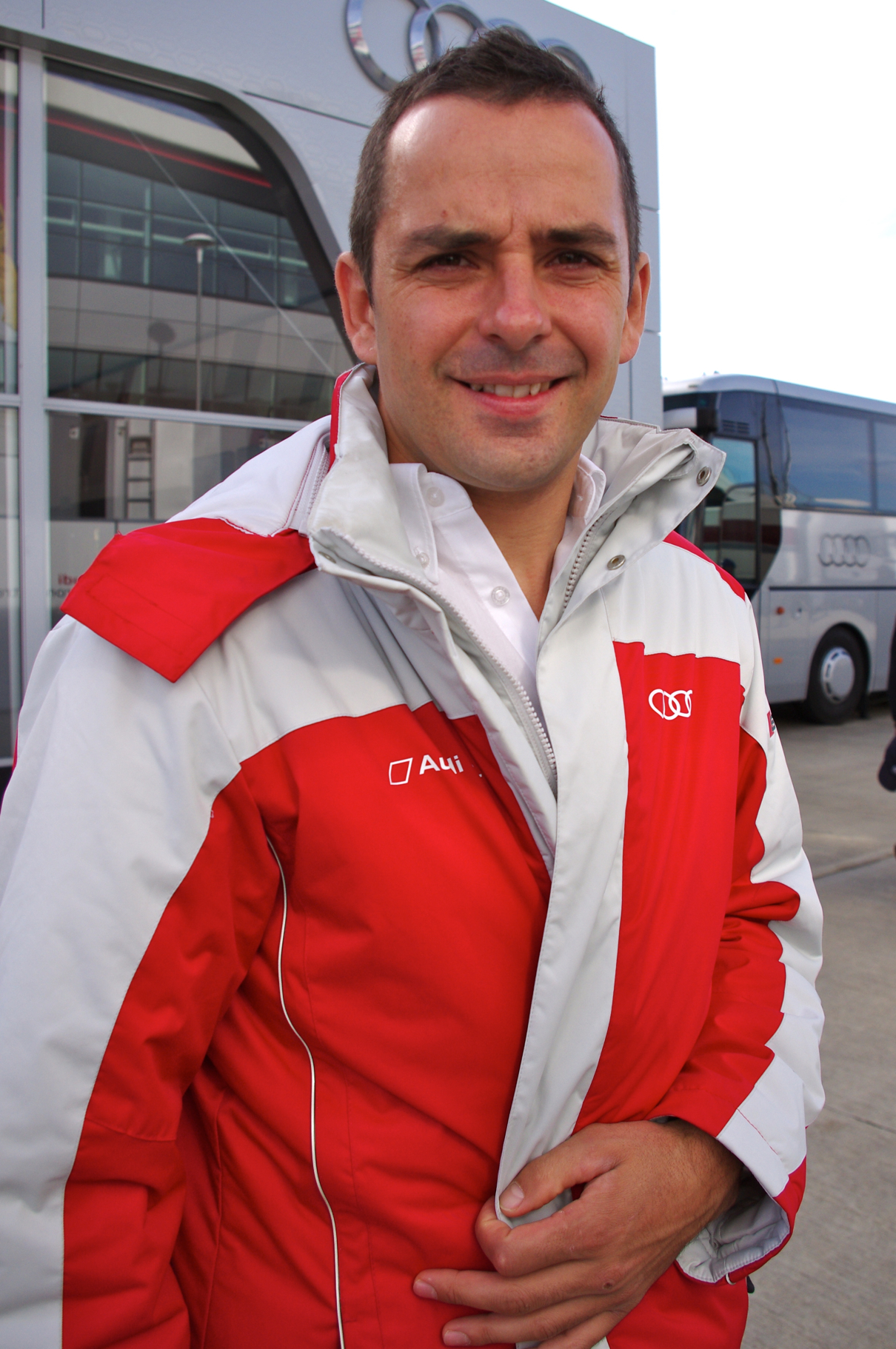
Benoît Tréluyer (pictured in 2013) was afflicted with multiple issues with his Audi

Benoît Tréluyer, driving the No. 7 Audi, was pressured by the two Toyota cars with Conway driving closely behind him heading into the Bus Stop chicane. Buemi got ahead of Conway driving into Les Combes to move into fourth place overall. Bird made a mistake at Pouhon, allowing his teammate Bruni to reclaim the LMGTE Pro lead. Lieb slowed with a hybrid system problem 20 minutes in, preventing him from getting full power and began lapping slower than most of the LMP1 runners. The result meant he was unable to utilise his car's full electric power capability for the remainder of the event, and he quickly fell to sixth place behind both Audi entrants and the first Toyota car. Tréluyer was overtaken around the outside for third place by Buemi at the Bus Stop chicane while Conway got ahead of the former shortly after. Lieb was told by his team to remain on the circuit and manage the problem as Porsche needed the extra points for the championship. Derani and Panciatci continued to battle for position which was resolved when the former went slightly wide at Eau Rouge and had to reduce his speed to avoid contact, allowing the latter to take over the position. After spinning at the start, Merhi moved back to fifth place in the LMP2 field.

Tréluyer was delayed by slower traffic, allowing Conway to overtake him for fourth position before the latter ran wide at the Bus Stop chicane. Van der Garde's car's sustained a damaged mirror and was ordered by race control to have it repaired at his scheduled pit stop. Buemi closed the gap to Lucas di Grassi in Audi's No. 8 entry and attempted to pass him driving into Eau Rouge and Raidillon but di Grassi was able to pull away on the Kemmel Straight. Buemi moved to the outside line at Blanchimont and moved in front of di Grassi, who went through grass, at the Bus Stop chicane for second place. Marino Franchitti's No. 67 Ford made contact with Aguas's car at Les Combes but both drivers were able to continue, although Augas lost the LMGTE Am lead. Conway locked his tyres and collided heavily with the rear of Victor Shaytar's delayed No. 37 SMP Racing car going into the Bus Stop chicane while attempting to close the gap to di Grassi. Conway immediately drove into the pit lane for repairs to his car's front-end. Both Porsche cars made pit stops after 49 minutes which had Jani taking over Lieb's driving duties while Hartley switched positions with Bernhard.

Buemi elected not to change tyres and gained the overall lead. Conway later served a drive-through penalty for his collision with Shaytar. The repairs to Van der Garde's vehicle meant he was stationary in his pit stall for four minutes which allowed Merhi to inherit fifth position in LMP2. Tréluyer reported to Audi that his car had no front downforce, while Buemi went off the track at Raidillon in his effort to push hard to extend his lead over Bernhard. Buemi was held up by one of the SMP entrants and an Aston Martin at Fagnes causing his advantage to be reduced to 1.015 seconds. Buemi missed his braking point for the Bus Stop chicane and went wide at La Source shortly afterwards, causing him to lose the lead to Bernhard. Buemi reclaimed the position at Eau Rouge but temporarily fell to second again after Bernhard overtook him on the Kemmel straight. Buemi then retook the place before the entry to Les Combes. At Blanchimont corner, Bernhard avoided colliding heavily with the rear-end of Buemi's car after the latter slid while lapping Gulf Racing's Porsche entry.

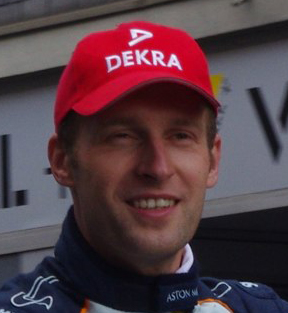
Stefan Mücke (pictured in 2011) suffered brusing after heavily colliding with the tyre barriers in his car

At the start of his 37th lap Bernhard reported a front-left puncture to his pit crew after driving over debris. He had difficulty turning into the track's right-hand turns and fell to fourth place behind di Grassi and Tréluyer. The tyre degraded further which damaged his car's bodywork, but he cautiously returned to the pit lane for a replacement front nose, and Webber relieved Bernhard of his driving duties. Strakka Racing's entry struck the Porsche's tyre carcass which became lodged in its right-front wheelarch but continued. Webber slowed with a punctured front-left tyre, causing him to return to the pit lane where he pushed back into his garage for ten-minute bodywork repairs. Then his front-axle energy retrieval system was changed, forcing Webber to remain in his garage for more than one hour. The second round of green flag pit stops began after 90 minutes. The No. 7 Audi and the No. 5 Toyota had cosmetic alterations to their rear-ends and the former vehicle was taken over by Fässler. The first Toyota, driven by Davidson, kept the lead after the pit stops. The first full course caution was shown when Nicki Thiim's No. 95 Aston Martin was hit by Dolan in the No. 38 G-Drive vehicle and went backwards into the Stavelot tyre barrier at a high speed. His car flipped over but he was unhurt. Marshals were required to repair the damaged barrier, and removed debris from the track.

During the yellow flag period, some cars elected to make pit stops, and González spun the No. 43 RGR Sport Ligier. The No. 7 Audi rejoined the race after repairs to its floor which was damaged when Tréluyer drove the car over a kerb and its ducts required cleaning after rubber picked up from the circuit caused the vehicle to overheat. The car rejoined in 15th place overall. The race restarted 12 minutes later with Davidson leading the field, ahead of the No. 8 Audi. Kobayashi immediately got ahead of Dumas to move into third position. Manor's No. 31 car driven by Richard Bradley overtook the No. 31 Extreme Speed Motorsports car of Chris Cumming at Eau Rouge for fourth place in LMP2. Nathanaël Berthon's No. 26 vehicle had its left-rear tyre punctured and sustained bodywork damage following contact with Abu Dhabi Proton's No. 88 Porsche at La Source, while Andy Priaulx in the No. 67 Ford passed Dempsey-Proton's No. 77 car for fifth place in LMGTE Pro. Berthon went off the track at the Bus Stop chicane while attempting to drive into the pit lane.

Upfront, the No. 5 Toyota increased its lead over the No. 8 Audi to 38.778 seconds, while the first Audi moved into 12th position. The No. 1 Porsche returned to the pit lane for a change of motor–generator unit on the front axle and gearbox because of different tyre speeds on the front wheels since the gearbox delivering the hybrid power was damaged. The car fell down the order in LMP1 after spending 1 hour and 40 minutes in the garage. G-Drive's No. 38 entry was issued a two-minute stop-and-go penalty for its role in the collision with the No. 95 Aston Martin. Fässler nearly placed Davidson into the grass at Stavelot while lapping the Extreme Speed Motorsports Ligier. Fässler then entered the pit lane for a replacement front bodywork. Gulf's Porsche car spun after contact with Emmanuel Collard's Ferrari at Rivage. The second full course caution was later necessitated when debris was located on three sections of the track. Davidson remained the leader at the restart, ahead of Duval. Davidson immediately increased his advantage over the latter. The No. 7 car hit the No. 36 Alpine at La Source, causing the latter to spin. The third round of pit stops commenced shortly afterwards when Audi and Toyota stopped for fuel and driver changes. Kraihamer's No. 13 Rebellion Racing vehicle hit the LMP2 leader Tor Graves in the No. 44 Manor Oreca, beaching his car on La Source's apex for a long period of time before rejoining the track.

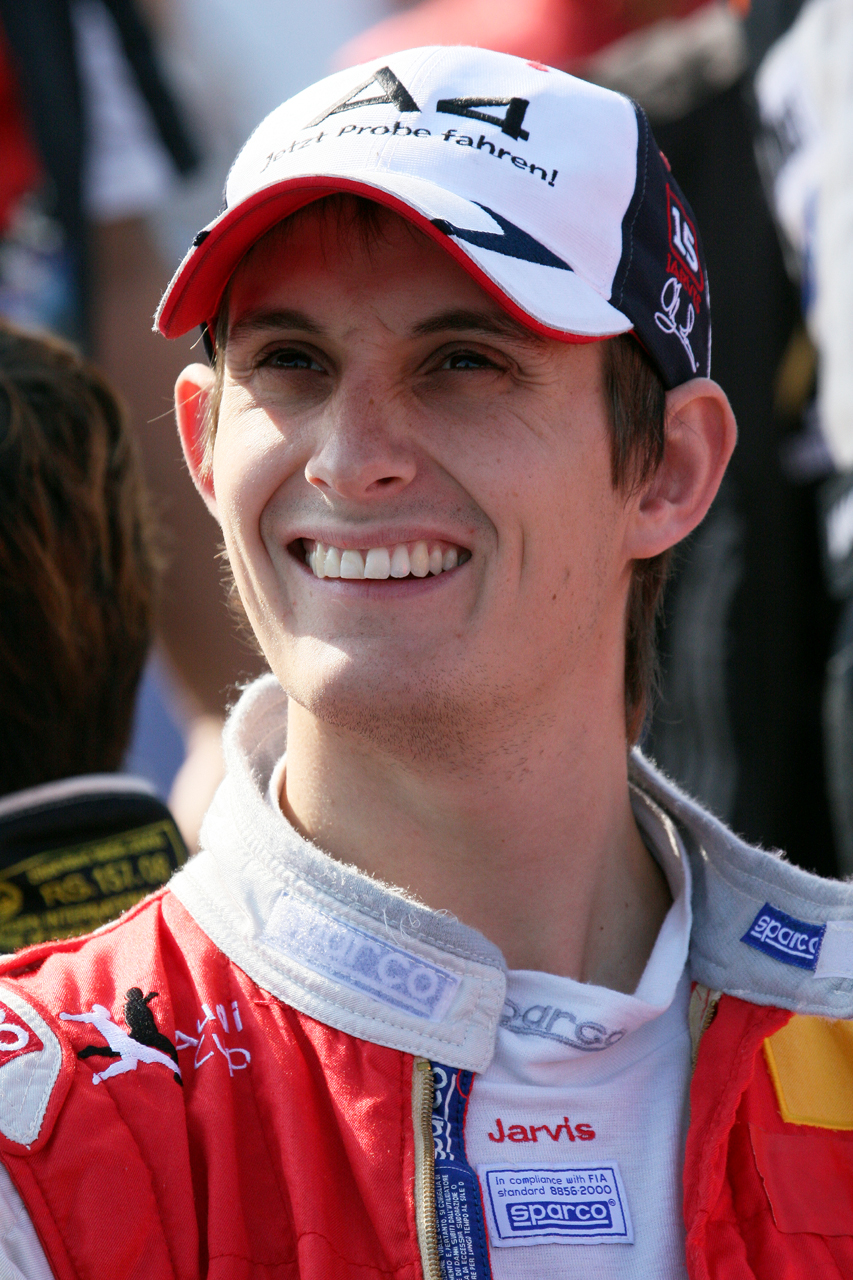
Oliver Jarvis (pictured in 2009) helped secure Audi's first overall victory of the season

Graves, who fell to second in class, went into Rivage's gravel trap with a left-front brake failure, causing him to retire. Toyota retired their No. 6 entry because of an engine failure caused by an electrical fault. Smoke bellowed from the rear-end of Nakajima's Toyota upon leaving La Source and he went back into the pit lane where his mechanics worked on rectifying the problem allowing Oliver Jarvis in the No. 8 Audi to inherit the lead. Webber drove straight at the Bus Stop chicane, spun, and drove into the pit lane. Stefan Mücke, who was affected by turbocharger issues, lost control of the No. 66 Ford after his left-rear tyre burst, and narrowly avoided going airborne. He made heavy contact with the left-hand side barriers at Raidillon, heavily damaging the front-end and removing both of the car's doors, littering debris on the circuit. Mücke stopped in the centre of the track, causing the No. 2 Porsche to swerve to avoid hitting him. The safety car was deployed to allow marshals to repair the heavily damaged tyre barrier. Drivers were instructed to steer onto the right-hand side of the track at Eau Rouge because the stranded car blocked the turn. Mücke was transported to the medical centre and was later taken to the local hospital for a precautionary check-up because of leg bruising and a cut to his right leg.

Audi's No. 8 car made a pit stop for tyres, fuel and a rear spoiler replacement. The safety car went into the pit lane after 24 minutes and racing resumed with Jarvis leading the field back up to speed. Lamy passed François Perrodo's No. 83 AF Corse Ferrari at Rivage corner to take over the LMGTE Am lead. Patrick Long in the No. 88 Abu Dhabi Proton Racing car overtook Perrodo at Les Comes to take over second position in the category. Fässler closed the gap to Heidfeld in the No. 12 Rebellion Racing vehicle but was spun by Albuquerque's RGR Sport car after moving in front of him upon lapping him at La Source. This resulted in heavy damage to the No. 7 Audi car's front-end, littering debris on the track. This was partly because Fässler braked early for the corner due to slower cars. Baxi DC Racing's No. 35 Alpine and the Abu Dhabi's No. 88 Porsche made heavy contact causing the former to sustain a left-rear puncture. It scattered debris on the Kemmel Straight, and stopped at the side of the track. Calado's engine failed, preventing him from winning in LMGTE Pro and he went into his garage to retire. Derani locked his old worn tyres at La Source, allowing Lapierre to close up to him. Lapierre overtook Derani around the outside for the LMP2 lead while lapping Franchitti's Ford GT at Fagnes corner.

Toyota's No. 5 car returned to the track to gain championship points but ran on electrical power. Merhi collided with Albuquerque while claiming third position from him. Unhindered in the final hour Jarvis crossed the start/finish line to clinch Audi's first overall victory of the season. It was Jarvis's and di Grassi's first win in the World Endurance Championship. The second Audi car secured its first victory since Tom Kristensen and Allan McNish in 2013. The No. 2 Porsche finished two laps behind in second, and Rebellion Racing's No. 12 vehicle took third-place, albeit a further two laps in arrears. Lapierre maintained his advantage to take the LMP2 victory, earning his co-drivers Gustavo Menezes and Richelmi their first World Endurance Championship class wins, followed in second place by Derani, who was five seconds adrift and was saving fuel and secured ESM's second podium result of the season. AF Corse's No. 71 Ferrari of Bird and Rigon took their second consecutive victory in LMGTE Pro, while the No. 67 Ford and the No. 97 Aston Martin took second and third positions, the former narrowly finishing ahead to secure its first podium finish in the World Endurance Championship despite a turbocharger wastegate problem in the fifth hour and the Aston Martin suffering an electrical glitch. The class win came after Bruni's engine failed nine minutes before the race's end, forcing him to enter the pit lane. In LMGTE Am, Aston Martin was unhindered upon passing the No. 83 AF Corse car and maintained its lead to win the category with a one-lap advantage.

=== Post-race ===
The top three drivers of each racing class appeared on the podium to collect their trophies and in a later press conference di Grassi described the event as "crazy" and said that his team did not expect to achieve the victory. He stated that he was "very happy" about clinching his first victory with his team and it would increase their motivation and wished that he would do well at Le Mans. His co-driver Duval said that his team deserved the victory and that Audi had recovered and secured points towards the championship, while Jarvis stated that the team did not expect to secure the win because of the car's slow lap times over the race weekend. Dumas said the team's second-place finish were a reward for his mechanics, while Lieb said it had been frustrating to lose hybrid power early in the race. Jani revealed that they treated their vehicle carefully due to the loss of hybrid power. Impreatori said Rebellion Racing's third-place finish was "a dream result" and set the objective of repeating the result at the season's next race; his co-driver Kraihamer hoped that the team's strong form would continue. Tuscher said that while the race was "tough", he was "super happy" about the result.

Davidson described the event as "strange" and stated that he had the pace to take the victory and had luck to his advantage while other competitors had problems: "I had everything crossed but it wasn't meant to be today. That's racing I suppose but it sure does hurt sometimes.” After finishing in 26th, Webber said it had been a tough event for his team and revealed that they were confident that they could have battled for the victory had his car not sustained two punctured tyres: "It just goes to show how hard endurance racing can be. We're all right on the limit and as we've seen here that's causing quite a high rate of attrition. Third time lucky at Le Mans is the plan." Mücke stated that he felt okay after his heavy crash and thanked his team for constructing a safe vehicle. Toyota conducted analysis of their engine failures days after the race and it transpired they were caused by the heavy forces placed onto them at the bottom of Eau Rouge corner. The chief executive officer of the World Endurance Championship Gerard Neveu described the event as "a great day for motorsport" but spoke of his feeling that it was moderately strange. He revealed that after the race, he had organised a meeting with several people and raised the question of why there was a high degree of the competitiveness at Spa: "It's quite simple: the cars are all so close together, the competition is so hard as never before. It can happen at any time - that is exciting...". Ryan Dalziel described ESM's second place in LMP2 as a "Fantastic result on a race weekend" in which the team were aware of their struggles with outright pace.

The result meant Lieb, Jani and Dumas maintained their lead in the Drivers' Championship with 43 points, 15 ahead of third-place finishers Imperatori, Kraihamer and Tuscher, who in turn, were a further five points in front of race winners Duval, di Grassi and Jarvis. Heidfeld, Prost and Piquet retained fourth position on 24 points and Kobayashi, Conway and Sarrazin rounded out the top five with 18 points. Porsche increased its lead in the Manufacturers' Championship on 56 points, 13 in front of their nearest rival Toyota in second, and a further two ahead of Audi with seven races left in the season.

=== Race result ===
The minimum number of laps for classification (70 per cent of the overall winning car's race distance) was 112 laps. Class winners are denoted in bold.

Final race classification
Pos	Class	No	Team	Drivers	Chassis	Tyre	Laps	Time/Retired
Pos	Class	No	Team	Drivers	Engine	Tyre	Laps	Time/Retired
1	**LMP1**	**8**	**(Germany) Audi Sport Team Joest**	**(France) Loïc Duval (Brazil) Lucas di Grassi (United Kingdom) Oliver Jarvis**	**Audi R18 e-tron quattro**	M	**160**	**06:00:32.112**
1	**LMP1**	**8**	**(Germany) Audi Sport Team Joest**	**(France) Loïc Duval (Brazil) Lucas di Grassi (United Kingdom) Oliver Jarvis**	**Audi TDI 4.0 L Turbo Diesel V6**	M	**160**	**06:00:32.112**
2	LMP1	2	(Germany) Porsche Team	(Germany) Marc Lieb (France) Romain Dumas (Switzerland) Neel Jani	Porsche 919 Hybrid	M	158	+2 Laps
2	LMP1	2	(Germany) Porsche Team	(Germany) Marc Lieb (France) Romain Dumas (Switzerland) Neel Jani	Porsche 2.0 L Turbo V4	M	158	+2 Laps
3	LMP1	13	(Switzerland) Rebellion Racing	(Austria) Dominik Kraihamer (Switzerland) Alexandre Imperatori (Switzerland) Mathéo Tuscher	Rebellion R-One	D	156	+4 Laps
3	LMP1	13	(Switzerland) Rebellion Racing	(Austria) Dominik Kraihamer (Switzerland) Alexandre Imperatori (Switzerland) Mathéo Tuscher	AER P60 2.4 L Turbo V6	D	156	+4 Laps
4	LMP1	12	(Switzerland) Rebellion Racing	(France) Nico Prost (Germany) Nick Heidfeld (Brazil) Nelson Piquet Jr.	Rebellion R-One	D	155	+5 Laps
4	LMP1	12	(Switzerland) Rebellion Racing	(France) Nico Prost (Germany) Nick Heidfeld (Brazil) Nelson Piquet Jr.	AER P60 2.4 L Turbo V6	D	155	+5 Laps
5	LMP1	7	(Germany) Audi Sport Team Joest	(Germany) André Lotterer (Switzerland) Marcel Fässler (France) Benoît Tréluyer	Audi R18 e-tron quattro	M	155	+5 Laps
5	LMP1	7	(Germany) Audi Sport Team Joest	(Germany) André Lotterer (Switzerland) Marcel Fässler (France) Benoît Tréluyer	Audi TDI 4.0 L Turbo Diesel V6	M	155	+5 Laps
6	LMP1	4	(Austria) ByKolles Racing Team	(Switzerland) Simon Trummer (United Kingdom) James Rossiter (United Kingdom) Oliver Webb	CLM P1/01	D	151	+9 Laps
6	LMP1	4	(Austria) ByKolles Racing Team	(Switzerland) Simon Trummer (United Kingdom) James Rossiter (United Kingdom) Oliver Webb	AER P60 2.4 L Turbo V6	D	151	+9 Laps
7	**LMP2**	**36**	**(France) Signatech Alpine**	**(France) Nicolas Lapierre (United States) Gustavo Menezes (Monaco) Stéphane Richelmi**	**Alpine A460**	D	**151**	**+9 Laps**
7	**LMP2**	**36**	**(France) Signatech Alpine**	**(France) Nicolas Lapierre (United States) Gustavo Menezes (Monaco) Stéphane Richelmi**	**Nissan VK45DE 4.5 L V8**	D	**151**	**+9 Laps**
8	LMP2	31	(United States) Extreme Speed Motorsports	(United Kingdom) Ryan Dalziel (Canada) Chris Cumming (Brazil) Pipo Derani	Ligier JS P2	D	151	+9 Laps
8	LMP2	31	(United States) Extreme Speed Motorsports	(United Kingdom) Ryan Dalziel (Canada) Chris Cumming (Brazil) Pipo Derani	Nissan VK45DE 4.5 L V8	D	151	+9 Laps
9	LMP2	45	(United Kingdom) Manor	(United Kingdom) Matt Rao (United Kingdom) Richard Bradley (Spain) Roberto Merhi	Oreca 05	D	151	+9 Laps
9	LMP2	45	(United Kingdom) Manor	(United Kingdom) Matt Rao (United Kingdom) Richard Bradley (Spain) Roberto Merhi	Nissan VK45DE 4.5 L V8	D	151	+9 Laps
10	LMP2	43	(Mexico) RGR Sport by Morand	(Mexico) Ricardo González (Portugal) Filipe Albuquerque (Brazil) Bruno Senna	Ligier JS P2	D	151	+9 Laps
10	LMP2	43	(Mexico) RGR Sport by Morand	(Mexico) Ricardo González (Portugal) Filipe Albuquerque (Brazil) Bruno Senna	Nissan VK45DE 4.5 L V8	D	151	+9 Laps
11	LMP2	26	(Russia) G-Drive Racing	(Russia) Roman Rusinov (France) Nathanaël Berthon (Germany) René Rast	Oreca 05	D	150	+10 Laps
11	LMP2	26	(Russia) G-Drive Racing	(Russia) Roman Rusinov (France) Nathanaël Berthon (Germany) René Rast	Nissan VK45DE 4.5 L V8	D	150	+10 Laps
12	LMP2	38	(Russia) G-Drive Racing	(United Kingdom) Simon Dolan (United Kingdom) Jake Dennis (Netherlands) Giedo van der Garde	Gibson 015S	D	148	+12 Laps
12	LMP2	38	(Russia) G-Drive Racing	(United Kingdom) Simon Dolan (United Kingdom) Jake Dennis (Netherlands) Giedo van der Garde	Nissan VK45DE 4.5 L V8	D	148	+12 Laps
13	LMP2	30	(United States) Extreme Speed Motorsports	(United States) Scott Sharp (United States) Ed Brown (United States) Johannes van Overbeek	Ligier JS P2	D	146	+14 Laps
13	LMP2	30	(United States) Extreme Speed Motorsports	(United States) Scott Sharp (United States) Ed Brown (United States) Johannes van Overbeek	Nissan VK45DE 4.5 L V8	D	146	+14 Laps
14	**LMGTE; Pro**	**71**	**(Italy) AF Corse**	**(Italy) Davide Rigon (United Kingdom) Sam Bird**	**Ferrari 488 GTE**	M	**145**	**+15 Laps**
14	**LMGTE; Pro**	**71**	**(Italy) AF Corse**	**(Italy) Davide Rigon (United Kingdom) Sam Bird**	**Ferrari F154CB 3.9 L Turbo V8**	M	**145**	**+15 Laps**
15	LMP2	44	(United Kingdom) Manor	(Thailand) Tor Graves (United Kingdom) James Jakes (United Kingdom) Will Stevens	Oreca 05	D	144	+16 Laps
15	LMP2	44	(United Kingdom) Manor	(Thailand) Tor Graves (United Kingdom) James Jakes (United Kingdom) Will Stevens	Nissan VK45DE 4.5 L V8	D	144	+16 Laps
16	LMGTE; Pro	67	(United States) Ford Chip Ganassi Team UK	(United Kingdom) Andy Priaulx (United Kingdom) Marino Franchitti (United Kingdom) Harry Tincknell	Ford GT	M	144	+16 Laps
16	LMGTE; Pro	67	(United States) Ford Chip Ganassi Team UK	(United Kingdom) Andy Priaulx (United Kingdom) Marino Franchitti (United Kingdom) Harry Tincknell	Ford EcoBoost 3.5 L Turbo V6	M	144	+16 Laps
17	LMGTE; Pro	97	(United Kingdom) Aston Martin Racing	(Brazil) Fernando Rees (New Zealand) Richie Stanaway (United Kingdom) Jonny Adam	Aston Martin V8 Vantage GTE	D	144	+16 Laps
17	LMGTE; Pro	97	(United Kingdom) Aston Martin Racing	(Brazil) Fernando Rees (New Zealand) Richie Stanaway (United Kingdom) Jonny Adam	Aston Martin 4.5 L V8	D	144	+16 Laps
18	LMGTE; Pro	77	(Germany) Dempsey-Proton Racing	(Austria) Richard Lietz (Denmark) Michael Christensen	Porsche 911 RSR	M	142	+18 Laps
18	LMGTE; Pro	77	(Germany) Dempsey-Proton Racing	(Austria) Richard Lietz (Denmark) Michael Christensen	Porsche 4.0 L Flat-6	M	142	+18 Laps
19	**LMGTE; Am**	**98**	**(United Kingdom) Aston Martin Racing**	**(Canada) Paul Dalla Lana (Portugal) Pedro Lamy (Austria) Mathias Lauda**	**Aston Martin V8 Vantage GTE**	D	**140**	**+20 Laps**
19	**LMGTE; Am**	**98**	**(United Kingdom) Aston Martin Racing**	**(Canada) Paul Dalla Lana (Portugal) Pedro Lamy (Austria) Mathias Lauda**	**Aston Martin 4.5 L V8**	D	**140**	**+20 Laps**
20	LMGTE; Am	83	(Italy) AF Corse	(France) François Perrodo (France) Emmanuel Collard (Portugal) Rui Águas	Ferrari 458 Italia GT2	M	139	+21 Laps
20	LMGTE; Am	83	(Italy) AF Corse	(France) François Perrodo (France) Emmanuel Collard (Portugal) Rui Águas	Ferrari F136GT 4.5 L V8	M	139	+21 Laps
21	LMGTE; Am	50	(France) Larbre Compétition	(Japan) Yutaka Yamagishi (Italy) Paolo Ruberti (France) Pierre Ragues	Chevrolet Corvette C7.R	M	139	+21 Laps
21	LMGTE; Am	50	(France) Larbre Compétition	(Japan) Yutaka Yamagishi (Italy) Paolo Ruberti (France) Pierre Ragues	Chevrolet LT5.5 5.5 L V8	M	139	+21 Laps
22	LMGTE; Am	78	(Hong Kong) KCMG	(Germany) Christian Ried (Germany) Wolf Henzler (Switzerland) Joël Camathias	Porsche 911 RSR	M	139	+21 Laps
22	LMGTE; Am	78	(Hong Kong) KCMG	(Germany) Christian Ried (Germany) Wolf Henzler (Switzerland) Joël Camathias	Porsche 4.0 L Flat-6	M	139	+21 Laps
23	LMGTE; Am	86	(United Kingdom) Gulf Racing	(United Kingdom) Michael Wainwright (United Kingdom) Adam Carroll (United Kingdom) Ben Barker	Porsche 911 RSR	M	138	+22 Laps
23	LMGTE; Am	86	(United Kingdom) Gulf Racing	(United Kingdom) Michael Wainwright (United Kingdom) Adam Carroll (United Kingdom) Ben Barker	Porsche 4.0 L Flat-6	M	138	+22 Laps
24	LMP2	37	(Russia) SMP Racing	(Russia) Vitaly Petrov (Russia) Viktor Shaytar (Russia) Kirill Ladygin	BR Engineering BR01	D	136	+24 Laps
24	LMP2	37	(Russia) SMP Racing	(Russia) Vitaly Petrov (Russia) Viktor Shaytar (Russia) Kirill Ladygin	Nissan VK45DE 4.5 L V8	D	136	+24 Laps
25	LMGTE; Am	88	(United Arab Emirates) Abu Dhabi-Proton Racing	(United Arab Emirates) Khaled Al Qubaisi (United States) Patrick Long (Denmark) David Heinemeier Hansson	Porsche 911 RSR	M	136	+24 Laps
25	LMGTE; Am	88	(United Arab Emirates) Abu Dhabi-Proton Racing	(United Arab Emirates) Khaled Al Qubaisi (United States) Patrick Long (Denmark) David Heinemeier Hansson	Porsche 4.0 L Flat-6	M	136	+24 Laps
26	LMP1	1	(Germany) Porsche Team	(Germany) Timo Bernhard (New Zealand) Brendon Hartley (Australia) Mark Webber	Porsche 919 Hybrid	M	112	+48 Laps
26	LMP1	1	(Germany) Porsche Team	(Germany) Timo Bernhard (New Zealand) Brendon Hartley (Australia) Mark Webber	Porsche 2.0 L Turbo V4	M	112	+48 Laps
27	LMP1	5	(Japan) Toyota Gazoo Racing	(United Kingdom) Anthony Davidson (Switzerland) Sébastien Buemi (Japan) Kazuki Nakajima	Toyota TS050 Hybrid	M	110	+50 Laps (Note: The No. 5 Toyota was penalised four laps by the stewards following the race because Nakajima did not meet the minimum drive time.)
27	LMP1	5	(Japan) Toyota Gazoo Racing	(United Kingdom) Anthony Davidson (Switzerland) Sébastien Buemi (Japan) Kazuki Nakajima	Toyota 2.4 L Turbo V6	M	110	+50 Laps
DNF	LMP2	35	(China) Baxi DC Racing Alpine	(United States) David Cheng (China) Ho-Pin Tung (France) Nelson Panciatici	Alpine A460	D	143	Collision
DNF	LMP2	35	(China) Baxi DC Racing Alpine	(United States) David Cheng (China) Ho-Pin Tung (France) Nelson Panciatici	Nissan VK45DE 4.5 L V8	D	143	Collision
DNF	LMGTE; Pro	51	(Italy) AF Corse	(Italy) Gianmaria Bruni (United Kingdom) James Calado	Ferrari 488 GTE	M	140	Engine
DNF	LMGTE; Pro	51	(Italy) AF Corse	(Italy) Gianmaria Bruni (United Kingdom) James Calado	Ferrari F154CB 3.9 L Turbo V8	M	140	Engine
DNF	LMP2	27	(Russia) SMP Racing	(France) Nicolas Minassian (Italy) Maurizio Mediani (Russia) David Markozov	BR Engineering BR01	D	123	Damage
DNF	LMP2	27	(Russia) SMP Racing	(France) Nicolas Minassian (Italy) Maurizio Mediani (Russia) David Markozov	Nissan VK45DE 4.5 L V8	D	123	Damage
DNF	LMGTE; Pro	66	(United States) Ford Chip Ganassi Team UK	(France) Olivier Pla (Germany) Stefan Mücke (United States) Billy Johnson	Ford GT	M	100	Accident
DNF	LMGTE; Pro	66	(United States) Ford Chip Ganassi Team UK	(France) Olivier Pla (Germany) Stefan Mücke (United States) Billy Johnson	Ford EcoBoost 3.5 L Turbo V6	M	100	Accident
DNF	LMP1	6	(Japan) Toyota Gazoo Racing	(France) Stéphane Sarrazin (United Kingdom) Mike Conway (Japan) Kamui Kobayashi	Toyota TS050 Hybrid	M	87	Engine
DNF	LMP1	6	(Japan) Toyota Gazoo Racing	(France) Stéphane Sarrazin (United Kingdom) Mike Conway (Japan) Kamui Kobayashi	Toyota 2.4 L Turbo V6	M	87	Engine
DNF	LMP2	42	(United Kingdom) Strakka Racing	(United Kingdom) Nick Leventis (United Kingdom) Jonny Kane (United Kingdom) Danny Watts	Gibson 015S	D	78	Engine
DNF	LMP2	42	(United Kingdom) Strakka Racing	(United Kingdom) Nick Leventis (United Kingdom) Jonny Kane (United Kingdom) Danny Watts	Nissan VK45DE 4.5 L V8	D	78	Engine
DNF	LMGTE; Pro	95	(United Kingdom) Aston Martin Racing	(Denmark) Nicki Thiim (Denmark) Marco Sørensen (United Kingdom) Darren Turner	Aston Martin V8 Vantage GTE	D	40	Accident
DNF	LMGTE; Pro	95	(United Kingdom) Aston Martin Racing	(Denmark) Nicki Thiim (Denmark) Marco Sørensen (United Kingdom) Darren Turner	Aston Martin 4.5 L V8	D	40	Accident

Tyre manufacturers
Key
Symbol	Tyre manufacturer
**D**	Dunlop
**M**	Michelin

== Standings after the race ==
World Endurance Drivers' Championship standings
Pos.	+/–	Driver	Points
1		(Germany) Marc Lieb (France) Romain Dumas (Switzerland) Neel Jani	43
2	1	(Austria) Dominik Kraihamer (Switzerland) Alexandre Imperatori (Switzerland) Mathéo Tuscher	30
3	9	(France) Loïc Duval (Brazil) Lucas di Grassi (United Kingdom) Oliver Jarvis	25
4		(France) Nico Prost (Germany) Nick Heidfeld (Brazil) Nelson Piquet Jr.	24
5	3	(France) Stéphane Sarrazin (United Kingdom) Mike Conway (Japan) Kamui Kobayashi	18

World Endurance Manufacturers' Championship standings
Pos.	+/–	Constructor	Points
1	1	(Germany) Porsche	56
2	1	(Japan) Toyota	43
3		(Germany) Audi	41

- Note: Only the top five positions are included for the Drivers' Championship standings.

== See also ==
- 2016 TCR International Series Spa-Francorchamps round

== Notes ==
FIA World Endurance Championship
Previous race: 6 Hours of Silverstone	2016 season	Next race: 24 Hours of Le Mans
