= 2019 4 Hours of Silverstone =

Endurance sportscar racing event

Map of the Silverstone Grand Prix Circuit

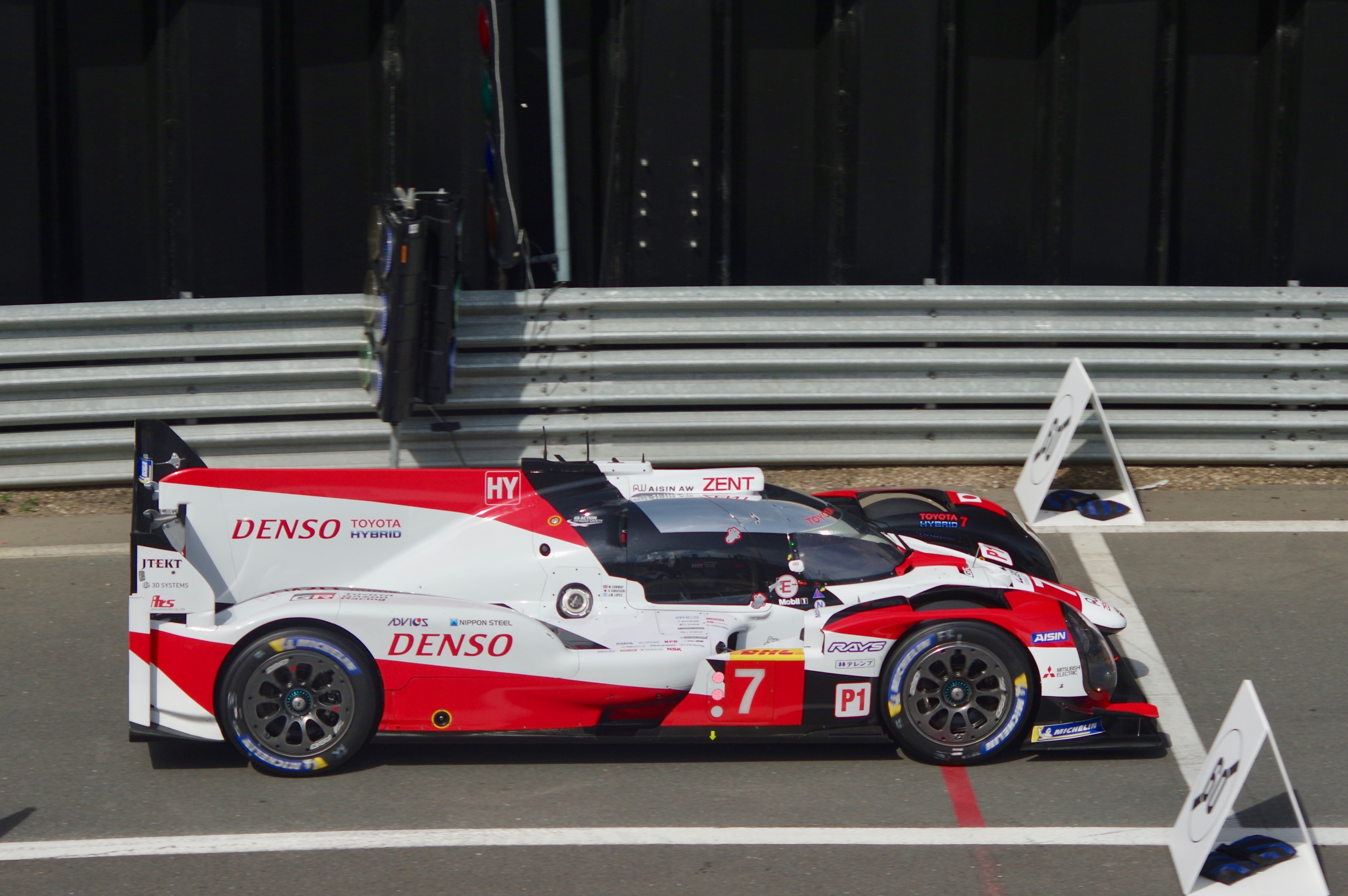
The #7 Toyota TS050 Hybrid, which scored pole and won the race overall

The 2019 4 Hours of Silverstone, officially known as the 2019 WEC 4 Hours of Silverstone, was an endurance sportscar racing event held on 1 September 2019, as the opening round of the 2019-20 FIA World Endurance Championship. This was the inaugural running of the race, in a 4 hours format, having previously been run as the 6 Hours of Silverstone. The race was won overall by Mike Conway, Kamui Kobayashi, and José María López, in the #7 Toyota TS050 Hybrid run by Toyota Gazoo Racing.

== Background ==
The provisional calendar for the 2019–20 FIA World Endurance Championship was unveiled at the 2018 6 Hours of Silverstone, featuring eight races, on five continents, starting at Silverstone in September 2019 with a four-hour race, and ending with the Le Mans 24 Hours in June 2020. It was noted that for first time in the FIA World Endurance Championship, 4 hour races would be introduced, at the Silverstone Circuit, and the Shanghai International Circuit, following a fan survey which was conducted by the championship despite overwhelming preference shown for 6 hour, 12 hour, and 24 hour races. The race would mark the return of Goodyear to international motorsports, with the Goodyear brand replacing Dunlop.

== Entry list ==
The initial entry list for the event was released on 17 July 2019, with a total of 30 cars, split across 4 classes initially being set to compete in the event, with Rebellion Racing only entering one of its 2 full-season Rebellion R13 LMP1 cars. The final entry list for the event, which saw majority of the available seats filled, and was updated just ahead of the event saw the number of cars increase to 31, following the addition of a second car for Rebellion Racing. This final entry list saw a number of changes, with Pastor Maldonado withdrawing from the #38 Jota car, and being replaced by António Félix da Costa, Porsche Carrera Cup regular David Kolkmann being drafted to replace David Heinemeier Hansson in the #56 Team Project 1 car, former Audi works LMP1 driver Oliver Jarvis replacing Chris Dyson in the #6 Team LNT, as well as the withdrawals from the event by Anthony Davidson and Alexandre Coigny due to injuries, leaving the #38 Jota and the #42 Cool Racing Oreca 07s to compete as a 2 driver entry.

== Qualifying ==
=== Qualifying Report ===
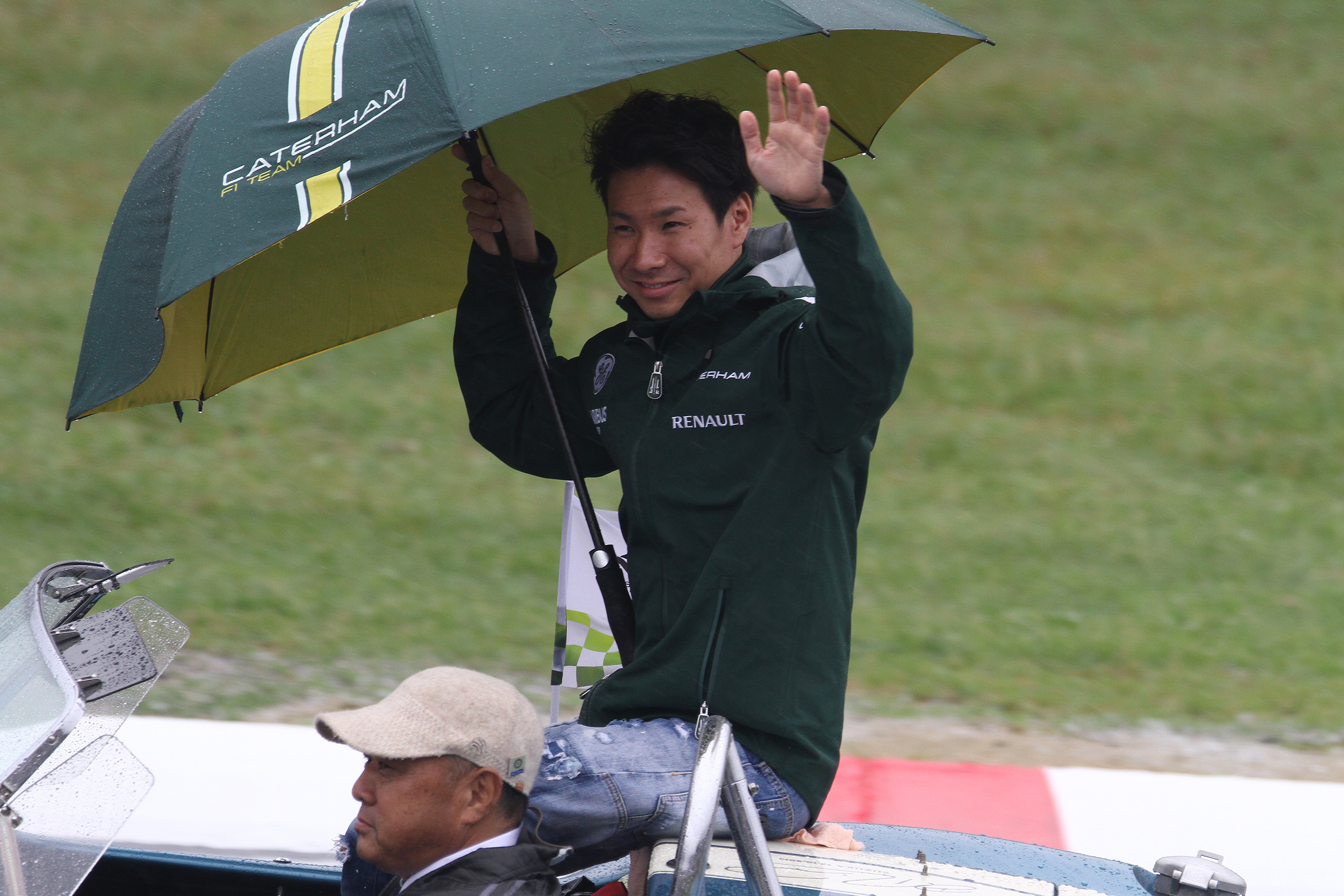
Kamui Kobayashi (pictured here in 2014) scored pole position with teammate Mike Conway

As per WEC Regulations, Qualifying on Saturday, held after FP3, was split into 2 different sessions of 20 minutes each, with the first session being held for the LM GTE categories, and the second session being held for the Le Mans Prototype classes. In Qualifying, teams must nominate two drivers from each crew, who must at least set one timed lap in qualifying, with the reference for the starting grid being calculated on the average of the two fastest lap times (one per driver). In an instance where multiple teams set an identical average time, priority is given to the team who set the average earliest.

During the LMP Qualifying session, in the LMP1 class, the #7 Toyota TS050 piloted by the pair of Mike Conway and Kamui Kobayashi scored pole, with a 1:36.015 Averaged time, almost a second quicker than the previous year's average time, despite the cars now carrying more ballast, due to a new track surface. The #8 Toyota TS050, piloted by the pair of Sébastien Buemi and Kazuki Nakajima averaged 3 tenths behind the #7, to finish 2nd, while the leading privateer car, the #1 Rebellion R13, piloted by Gustavo Menezes and Bruno Senna averaged almost half a second behind the #7 to finish 3rd.

In the LMP2 class, the #29 Racing Team Nederland Oreca 07, piloted by Giedo van der Garde and Job van Uitert, set an average of 1m37.220s, to go six tenths faster than the 2nd placed #22 United Autosports Oreca 07, which was piloted by Paul di Resta, and Philip Hanson, averaging a 1:41.683 lap time, which meant that Michelin-shod cars scored a 1–2. The highest placed Goodyear-shod team, the #37 Jackie Chan DC Racing piloted by Will Stevens, and Gabriel Aubry would set an average of 1:41.683, enough to earn 3rd on the LMP2 grid.

During the GTE Qualifying session, in the LMGTE Pro class, the AF Corse team scored a 1–2 in Qualifying, with the cars being over 5 tenths faster than the competition. The #51 Ferrari 488 GTE Evo piloted by Alessandro Pier Guidi and James Calado averaged 1:54.171, a tenth faster than the #71 piloted by Davide Rigon and Miguel Molina, which had a combined average of 1:54.302. The fastest non-Ferrari was the #97 Aston Martin Racing Aston Martin Vantage AMR GTE, which finished 3rd, and was piloted by Alex Lynn and Maxime Martin, who averaged a 1:54.992.

In the LMGTE Am class, the #90 TF Sport Aston Martin Vantage AMR GTE scored pole in the class, with Charlie Eastwood and Salih Yoluc piloting the car, and achieving an average of 1:56.034. The #56 Team Project 1 car secured P2, with Egidio Perfetti, and Matteo Cairoli at the wheel, setting an average of 1:56.371. The GTE-Am class had the sole qualifying non-starter, with the #57 Team Project 1 suffering from an engine failure towards the end of the third free practice session, that left mechanics scrambling to do an engine replacement, due to a flywheel failure.

=== Post-Qualifying ===
Porsche was fined €25,000 for a Homologation Error, which had been found on the #56 Team Project 1 during post-qualifying scrutineering. Porsche had provided an erratum to update the car's homologation papers during the WEC pre-season test, The Prologue, and while the erratum was valid on 1 August 2019, Porsche had failed to forward the updated homologation papers or relevant parts to its customer teams. Porsche cited a lack of parts for delivery as its reason for failing to issue the relevant updated parts to the teams, while simultaneously admitting its failure to inform the Fédération Internationale de l'Automobile. The team was not penalized, as the issue was judged by the FIA to have been of no fault of the team, with the blame lying squarely with Porsche, and as the car did not gain any performance advantage from not using the updated parts.

=== Qualifying Results ===
Pole position winners in each class are marked in bold.

Pos	Class	Team	Average Time	Gap	Grid
1	**LMP1**	**No. 7 Toyota Gazoo Racing**	**1:36.015**	−	**1**
2	LMP1	No. 8 Toyota Gazoo Racing	1:36.315	+0.300	2
3	LMP1	No. 1 Rebellion Racing	1:36.560	+0.545	3
4	LMP1	No. 3 Rebellion Racing	1:37.024	+1.009	4
5	LMP1	No. 6 Team LNT	1:37.220	+1.205	5
6	LMP1	No. 5 Team LNT	1:37.464	+1.449	6
7	**LMP2**	**No. 29 Racing Team Nederland**	**1:40.948**	**+4.933**	**7**
8	LMP2	No. 22 United Autosports	1:41.683	+5.668	8
9	LMP2	No. 37 Jackie Chan DC Racing	1:41.976	+5.961	9
10	LMP2	No. 42 Cool Racing	1:42.017	+6.002	10
11	LMP2	No. 36 Signatech Alpine Elf	1:42.216	+6.201	11
12	LMP2	No. 33 High Class Racing	1:42.414	+6.399	12
13	LMP2	No. 38 Jota Sport	1:42.885	+6.870	13
14	LMP2	No. 47 Cetilar Racing	1:43.363	+7.348	14
15	**LMGTE Pro**	**No. 51 AF Corse**	**1:54.171**	**+18.156**	**15**
16	LMGTE Pro	No. 71 AF Corse	1:54.302	+18.287	16
17	LMGTE Pro	No. 97 Aston Martin Racing	1:54.992	+18.977	17
18	LMGTE Pro	No. 91 Porsche GT Team	1:55.067	+19.052	18
19	LMGTE Pro	No. 95 Aston Martin Racing	1:55.149	+19.134	19
20	LMGTE Pro	No. 92 Porsche GT Team	1:55.493	+19.478	20
21	**LMGTE Am**	**No. 90 TF Sport**	**1:56.034**	**+20.019**	**21**
22	LMGTE Am	No. 56 Team Project 1	1:56.371	+20.356	22
23	LMGTE Am	No. 98 Aston Martin Racing	1:56.469	+20.454	23
24	LMGTE Am	No. 83 AF Corse	1:56.489	+20.474	24
25	LMGTE Am	No. 54 AF Corse	1:56.742	+20.727	25
26	LMGTE Am	No. 77 Dempsey-Proton Racing	1:57.351	+21.336	26
27	LMGTE Am	No. 88 Dempsey-Proton Racing	1:57.507	+21.492	27
28	LMGTE Am	No. 62 Red River Sport	1:57.934	+21.919	28
29	LMGTE Am	No. 86 Gulf Racing	1:58.199	+22.184	29
30	LMGTE Am	No. 70 MR Racing	1:58.336	+22.321	30
31	LMGTE Am	No. 57 Team Project 1	−	−	31

== Race ==
=== Race Report ===
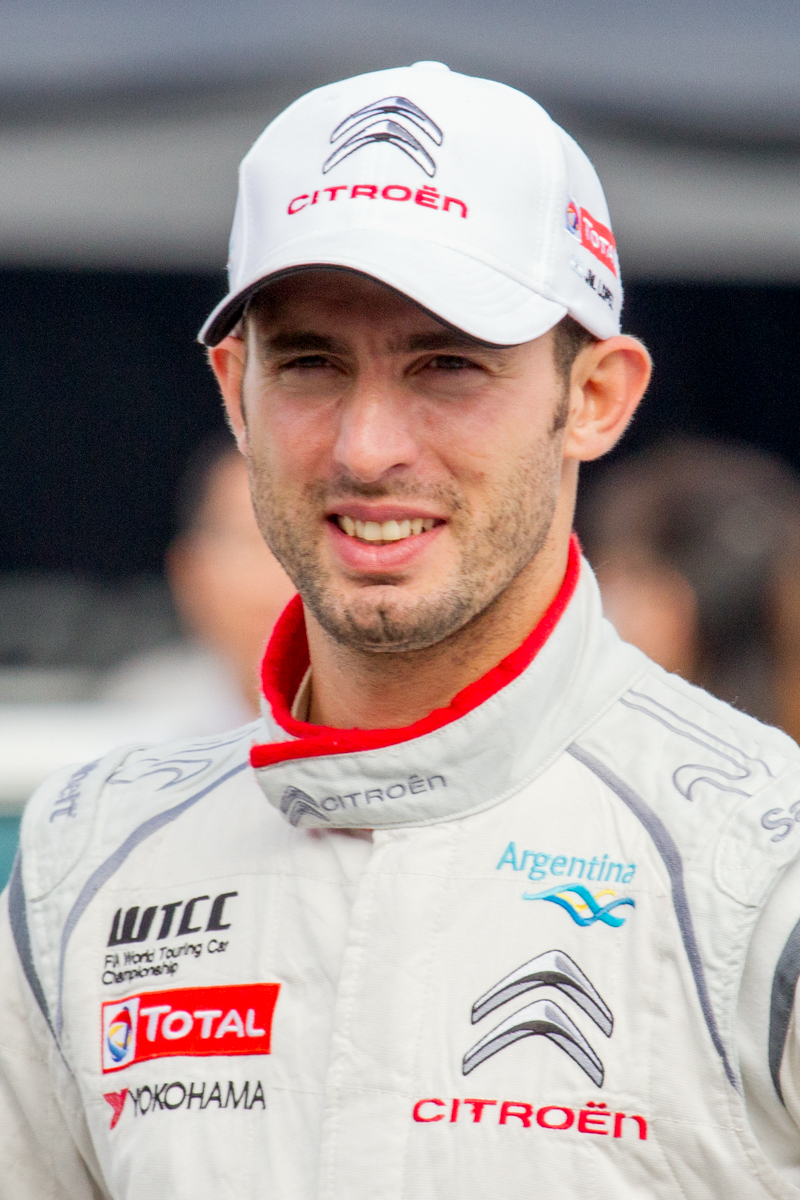
José María López (pictured here in 2014) brought the #7 Toyota TS050 Hybrid across the line to lead home a 1-2 finish for Toyota Gazoo Racing

At the start of the race, following the rolling start, Mike Conway in the #7 TS050 Hybrid led the field, ahead of Sébastien Buemi, in the sister #8 car, with the two Toyota TS050 Hybrids remaining ahead of the field for the first 30 minutes of the race. This was in spite of a safety car being brought out, due to the #22 United Autosports stopping on track with an electronics failure. This lead would later be disrupted when a Full Course Yellow period occurred 30 minutes into the season-opening race, which was caused by the #6 Team LNT Ginetta G60-LT-P1 losing its right rear wheel. Both Rebellion R13s, which were running third and fourth, pitted immediately as the yellow flags were raised, while the Toyotas waited until later in the intervention to come in, with the delayed pit stops costing Toyota GAZOO Racing the lead, as the Full Course Yellow was lifted when both cars pitted, easily handing the Rebellion Racing team a 1–2, with Bruno Senna in the #1 leading from Loïc Duval in the #3. The Rebellion Racing 1-2 would not last long however, as the pace of the Rebellions were not match for that of the Toyota Hybrids, as Sébastien Buemi would swiftly overtake both Rebellions before the end of the first hour. Buemi in the #8 would later lead the Toyota 1–2, as Conway's #7 car fell behind in the pits. Conway would later overtake both Rebellions before he and Buemi opened up a commanding 30-second gap at the head of the field. Towards the end of the 1st hour, the #5 Ginetta G60-LT-P1 would fall off the lead lap, while the sister #6 found itself plagued by trouble, with the loss of the rear wheel causing the first Full Course Yellow, and a later collision with the #71 AF Corse Ferrari 488 GTE bringing out the second safety car, with the collision taking the Ferrari out of the race.

Rainfall during the second hour would slightly close the gap between the hybrid-powered Toyotas and the non-hybrid Rebellions, after Toyota elected to delay its switch to wet tires. However, this would do little to reduce the gap, due to the sheer pace of the Toyotas when fitted with wets; a good pitstop for the #3, put new driver Pipo Derani in the lead. This lead however, would just last a mere six turns, with Kobayashi swiftly overtaking Derani in the #7 Toyota on the approach to Brooklands, using the Hybrid power to exit the corner ahead of Derani, while Hartley soon followed suit in the sister car. Norman Nato in the #1 Rebellion went for a pit stop but locked up the wheels when stopping, with the car skidding on its slicks, in the wet pitlane, hitting 3 crew members, with one of them hospitalised for a broken toe, and the car suffering damage. In the LMP2 Category, the #29 Racing Team Nederland Oreca 07 held a commanding lead at the 2 hours mark, following a great stint by Giedo van der Garde, with Job van Uitert building upon the lead built by his teammate's earlier stint, conquering the wet conditions. In the LM GTE Pro category, the Porsche GT Team held a 1–2 in the GTE-Pro class with Michael Christensen leading from Richard Lietz, while Maxime Martin sat third in the No. 97 Aston Martin Vantage AMR GTE. In the LM GTE Am class, the #56 Team Project 1 Porsche 911 RSR led the field.

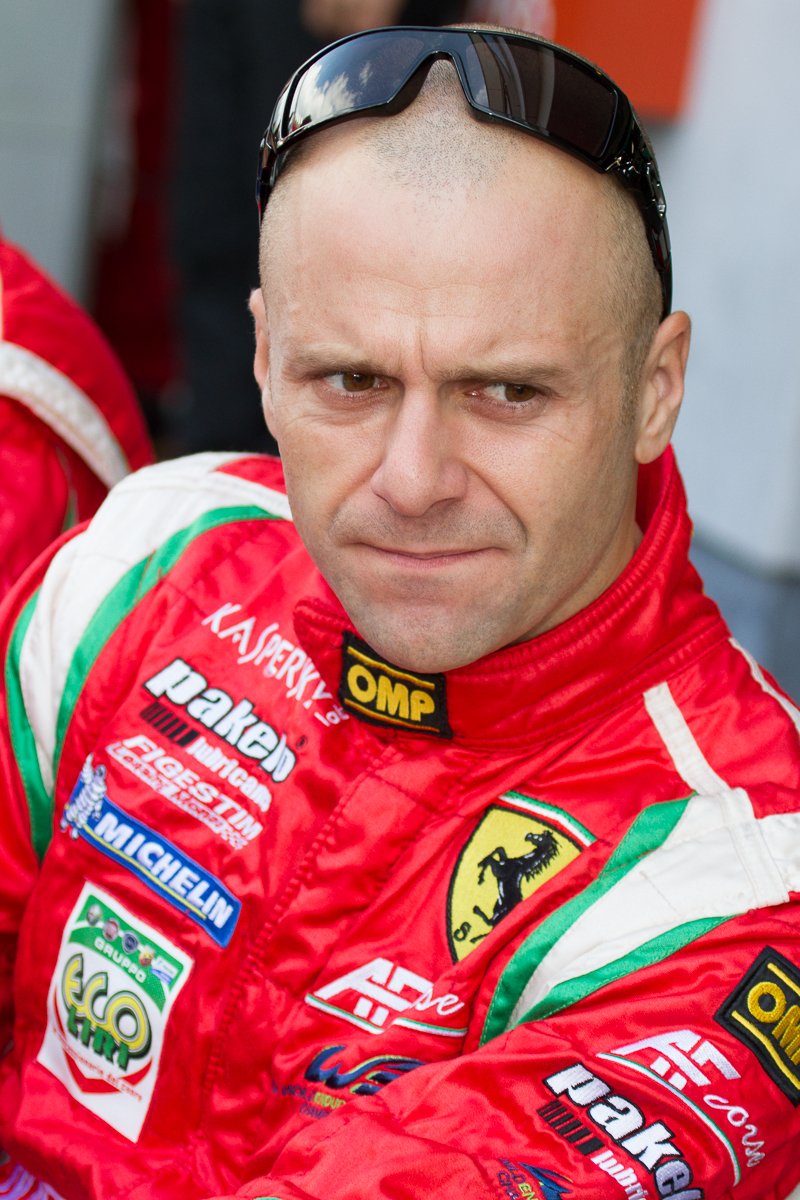
Gianmaria Bruni (picture here in 2012) brought the #91 Porsche 911 RSR-19 to the chequered flag to a give the car a race win on its debut.

In the third hour, Hartley received a call from the team to allow Kobayashi by, with the Kiwi doing so at Brooklands. This order would remain throughout the race, even as the two cars pitted for the final driver swap, which saw José María López take the wheel of the #7, and Kazuki Nakajima receiving the #8. The pair would retain this order in a controlled fashion until the finish, separated by a 1.901-second gap. Rebellion Racing would ultimately finish on third step of the podium with the #3 R13, while the sister car, #1 had a late power steering failure 10 minutes from the end, that saw the car spend time in the garage, paired with a puncture earlier in the race, saw it finish in 10th overall. The #5 Team LNT Ginetta G60-LT-P1 would finish 4th, with the car having entered the gravel trap at one point mid race, and the car finishing 5 laps down, on the LMP2 lead lap, overtaking the #42 Cool Racing Oreca in the closing stages of the race. In LMP2, the class winner, the #42 Cool Racing car finished 5th overall, taking advantage of the early dramas in the race, and overcoming the handicap of a drive-through penalty to finish 5 laps down. The #36 Signatech Alpine Oreca would finish 2nd, taking advantage of a missing gear on the #29 Racing Team Nederland in the closing laps, in a rather eventful race for the #29, even splitting the Ginettas in the early stages of the race, with the car holding a commanding lead in the initial stages in the LMP2 class.

In the LM GTE Categories, in the GTE Pro class, the Porsche GT Team scored a 1–2, on the debut of the Porsche 911 RSR-19, with the pairing of Gianmaria Bruni and Richard Lietz in the #91 car leading the 1-2 finish, capitalizing on the troubles of the AF Corse Ferrari 488 GTE Evos, which had dominated qualifying the previous day. The #71 car retired after a clash with the #6 Ginetta G60-LT-P1, while the #51 was given a drive-through penalty for overtaking under a safety car, when leading the GTE Pro race, which allowed Porsche to regain a 1–2. The Drive Through assigned to the #51 was cancelled after it was served because stewards realized they made a mistake and the Ferrari did not made an infraction under the safety car regime. The Ferrari was denied by a victory chance and finish in 4th. Aston Martin Racing finished 3rd with the #97 entry, driven by Maxime Martin and Alex Lynn. The #83 AF Corse 488 GTE Evo would win the GTE Am class, with the car shining from the competitors in what was a race of uncertainty, with the trio of Niklas Nielsen, Emmanuel Collard and Francois Perrodo performing brilliantly throughout the race, to bring the car to a win on its debut in the GTE Am class.

=== Post Race ===
Following the race, Rebellion Racing announced that the #3 would not contest the remaining flyaway WEC races, and would likely only return at the 2020 6 Hours of Spa-Francorchamps, with Rebellion CEO Calim Bouhadra citing budget and logistical reasons, and saying that the last-minute decision to run the second car at Silverstone resulted in the drastic measure of having to stop its Japan-bound sea freight, while in Greece in order to retrieve sufficient parts to run both cars for the season opening race. Race winner Mike Conway expressed his surprise at the lack of a challenge from Rebellion Racing, due to the sheer pace the cars had demonstrated in Free Practice, against Toyota's expectations going into the race, which were that Rebellion could likely challenge on outright pace, even if the non-hybrid cars’ strength only fully came in traffic-free conditions, where the Toyotas would lose their Hybrid power advantages.

Ferrari and Aston Martin Racing later expressed their displeasure with the race control, due to drive through penalties, which were later rescinded mid-race, after they had already been served, with Ferrari Competizioni GT technical director Ferdinando Cannizzo saying that it had effectively ended Ferrari's chances of victory.

=== Race Result ===
The minimum number of laps for classification (70% of the overall winning car's race distance) was 90 laps. Class winners in bold.

Pos	Class	No	Team	Drivers	Chassis	Tyre	Laps	Time/Retired
Pos	Class	No	Team	Drivers	Engine	Tyre	Laps	Time/Retired
1	**LMP1**	**7**	**(Japan) Toyota Gazoo Racing**	**(United Kingdom) Mike Conway (Japan) Kamui Kobayashi (Argentina) José María López**	**Toyota TS050 Hybrid**	M	**129**	**4:00:57.709**
1	**LMP1**	**7**	**(Japan) Toyota Gazoo Racing**	**(United Kingdom) Mike Conway (Japan) Kamui Kobayashi (Argentina) José María López**	**Toyota 2.4L Turbo V6**	M	**129**	**4:00:57.709**
2	LMP1	8	(Japan) Toyota Gazoo Racing	(Switzerland) Sébastien Buemi (Japan) Kazuki Nakajima (New Zealand) Brendon Hartley	Toyota TS050 Hybrid	M	129	+1.901
2	LMP1	8	(Japan) Toyota Gazoo Racing	(Switzerland) Sébastien Buemi (Japan) Kazuki Nakajima (New Zealand) Brendon Hartley	Toyota 2.4L Turbo V6	M	129	+1.901
3	LMP1	3	(Switzerland) Rebellion Racing	(France) Nathanaël Berthon (Brazil) Pipo Derani (France) Loïc Duval	Rebellion R13	M	128	+1 Lap
3	LMP1	3	(Switzerland) Rebellion Racing	(France) Nathanaël Berthon (Brazil) Pipo Derani (France) Loïc Duval	Gibson GL458 4.5 L V8	M	128	+1 Lap
4	LMP1	5	(United Kingdom) Team LNT	(United Kingdom) Charlie Robertson (United Kingdom) Ben Hanley (Russia) Egor Orudzhev	Ginetta G60-LT-P1	M	124	+5 Laps
4	LMP1	5	(United Kingdom) Team LNT	(United Kingdom) Charlie Robertson (United Kingdom) Ben Hanley (Russia) Egor Orudzhev	AER P60C 2.4 L Turbo V6	M	124	+5 Laps
5	**LMP2**	**42**	**(Switzerland) Cool Racing**	**(France) Nicolas Lapierre** **(Switzerland) Antonin Borga**	**Oreca 07**	M	**124**	**+5 Laps**
5	**LMP2**	**42**	**(Switzerland) Cool Racing**	**(France) Nicolas Lapierre** **(Switzerland) Antonin Borga**	**Gibson GK428 4.2 L V8**	M	**124**	**+5 Laps**
6	LMP2	36	(France) Signatech Alpine Elf	(France) Thomas Laurent (Brazil) André Negrão (France) Pierre Ragues	Oreca 07	M	124	+5 Laps
6	LMP2	36	(France) Signatech Alpine Elf	(France) Thomas Laurent (Brazil) André Negrão (France) Pierre Ragues	Gibson GK428 4.2 L V8	M	124	+5 Laps
7	LMP2	29	(Netherlands) Racing Team Nederland	(Netherlands) Giedo van der Garde (Netherlands) Frits van Eerd (Netherlands) Job van Uitert	Oreca 07	M	124	+5 Laps
7	LMP2	29	(Netherlands) Racing Team Nederland	(Netherlands) Giedo van der Garde (Netherlands) Frits van Eerd (Netherlands) Job van Uitert	Gibson GK428 4.2 L V8	M	124	+5 Laps
8	LMP2	37	(China) Jackie Chan DC Racing	(China) Ho-Pin Tung (France) Gabriel Aubry (United Kingdom) Will Stevens	Oreca 07	G	124	+5 Laps
8	LMP2	37	(China) Jackie Chan DC Racing	(China) Ho-Pin Tung (France) Gabriel Aubry (United Kingdom) Will Stevens	Gibson GK428 4.2 L V8	G	124	+5 Laps
9	LMP2	38	(United Kingdom) Jota Sport	(Portugal) António Félix da Costa (Mexico) Roberto González	Oreca 07	G	124	+5 Laps
9	LMP2	38	(United Kingdom) Jota Sport	(Portugal) António Félix da Costa (Mexico) Roberto González	Gibson GK428 4.2 L V8	G	124	+5 Laps
10	LMP1	1	(Switzerland) Rebellion Racing	(Brazil) Bruno Senna (United States) Gustavo Menezes (France) Norman Nato	Rebellion R13	M	123	+6 Laps
10	LMP1	1	(Switzerland) Rebellion Racing	(Brazil) Bruno Senna (United States) Gustavo Menezes (France) Norman Nato	Gibson GL458 4.5 L V8	M	123	+6 Laps
11	LMP2	47	(Italy) Cetilar Racing	(Italy) Andrea Belicchi (Italy) Roberto Lacorte (Italy) Giorgio Sernagiotto	Dallara P217	M	122	+7 Laps
11	LMP2	47	(Italy) Cetilar Racing	(Italy) Andrea Belicchi (Italy) Roberto Lacorte (Italy) Giorgio Sernagiotto	Gibson GK428 4.2 L V8	M	122	+7 Laps
12	LMP2	33	(Denmark) High Class Racing	(Denmark) Anders Fjordbach (United States) Mark Patterson (Japan) Kenta Yamashita	Oreca 07	G	122	+7 Laps
12	LMP2	33	(Denmark) High Class Racing	(Denmark) Anders Fjordbach (United States) Mark Patterson (Japan) Kenta Yamashita	Gibson GK428 4.2 L V8	G	122	+7 Laps
13	**LMGTE Pro**	**91**	**(Germany) Porsche GT Team**	**(Italy) Gianmaria Bruni** **(Austria) Richard Lietz**	**Porsche 911 RSR-19**	M	**115**	**+14 Laps**
13	**LMGTE Pro**	**91**	**(Germany) Porsche GT Team**	**(Italy) Gianmaria Bruni** **(Austria) Richard Lietz**	**Porsche 4.2L Flat-Six**	M	**115**	**+14 Laps**
14	LMGTE Pro	92	(Germany) Porsche GT Team	(Denmark) Michael Christensen (France) Kévin Estre	Porsche 911 RSR-19	M	115	+14 Laps
14	LMGTE Pro	92	(Germany) Porsche GT Team	(Denmark) Michael Christensen (France) Kévin Estre	Porsche 4.2L Flat-Six	M	115	+14 Laps
15	LMGTE Pro	97	(United Kingdom) Aston Martin Racing	(United Kingdom) Alex Lynn (Belgium) Maxime Martin	Aston Martin Vantage AMR GTE	M	115	+14 Laps
15	LMGTE Pro	97	(United Kingdom) Aston Martin Racing	(United Kingdom) Alex Lynn (Belgium) Maxime Martin	Aston Martin 4.0L Turbo V8	M	115	+14 Laps
16	LMGTE Pro	51	(Italy) AF Corse	(United Kingdom) James Calado (Italy) Alessandro Pier Guidi	Ferrari 488 GTE EVO	M	115	+14 Laps
16	LMGTE Pro	51	(Italy) AF Corse	(United Kingdom) James Calado (Italy) Alessandro Pier Guidi	Ferrari F154CB 4.0L Turbo V8	M	115	+14 Laps
17	LMGTE Pro	95	(United Kingdom) Aston Martin Racing	(Denmark) Marco Sørensen (Denmark) Nicki Thiim	Aston Martin Vantage AMR GTE	M	114	+15 Laps
17	LMGTE Pro	95	(United Kingdom) Aston Martin Racing	(Denmark) Marco Sørensen (Denmark) Nicki Thiim	Aston Martin 4.0L Turbo V8	M	114	+15 Laps
18	**LMGTE Am**	**83**	**(Italy) AF Corse**	**(France) Emmanuel Collard** **(Denmark) Nicklas Nielsen** **(France) François Perrodo**	**Ferrari 488 GTE EVO**	M	**114**	**+15 Laps**
18	**LMGTE Am**	**83**	**(Italy) AF Corse**	**(France) Emmanuel Collard** **(Denmark) Nicklas Nielsen** **(France) François Perrodo**	**Ferrari F154CB 4.0L Turbo V8**	M	**114**	**+15 Laps**
19	LMGTE Am	98	(United Kingdom) Aston Martin Racing	(Canada) Paul Dalla Lana (United Kingdom) Ross Gunn (United Kingdom) Darren Turner	Aston Martin Vantage AMR GTE	M	113	+15 Laps
19	LMGTE Am	98	(United Kingdom) Aston Martin Racing	(Canada) Paul Dalla Lana (United Kingdom) Ross Gunn (United Kingdom) Darren Turner	Aston Martin 4.0L Turbo V8	M	113	+15 Laps
20	LMGTE Am	70	(Japan) MR Racing	(Monaco) Olivier Beretta (Japan) Kei Cozzolino (Japan) Motoaki Ishikawa	Ferrari 488 GTE EVO	M	113	+16 laps
20	LMGTE Am	70	(Japan) MR Racing	(Monaco) Olivier Beretta (Japan) Kei Cozzolino (Japan) Motoaki Ishikawa	Ferrari F154CB 4.0L Turbo V8	M	113	+16 laps
21	LMGTE Am	86	(United Kingdom) Gulf Racing	(United Kingdom) Ben Barker (United Kingdom) Michael Wainwright (United Kingdom) Andrew Watson	Porsche 911 RSR	M	113	+16 laps
21	LMGTE Am	86	(United Kingdom) Gulf Racing	(United Kingdom) Ben Barker (United Kingdom) Michael Wainwright (United Kingdom) Andrew Watson	Porsche 4.0L Flat 6	M	113	+16 laps
22	LMGTE Am	77	(Germany) Dempsey-Proton Racing	(Australia) Matt Campbell (Italy) Riccardo Pera (Germany) Christian Ried	Porsche 911 RSR	M	113	+16 laps
22	LMGTE Am	77	(Germany) Dempsey-Proton Racing	(Australia) Matt Campbell (Italy) Riccardo Pera (Germany) Christian Ried	Porsche 4.0L Flat 6	M	113	+16 laps
23	LMGTE Am	56	(Germany) Team Project 1	(Italy) Matteo Cairoli (Germany) David Kolkmann (Norway) Egidio Perfetti	Porsche 911 RSR	M	113	+16 laps
23	LMGTE Am	56	(Germany) Team Project 1	(Italy) Matteo Cairoli (Germany) David Kolkmann (Norway) Egidio Perfetti	Porsche 4.0L Flat 6	M	113	+16 laps
24	LMGTE Am	90	(United Kingdom) TF Sport	(United Kingdom) Jonathan Adam (Republic of Ireland) Charlie Eastwood (Turkey) Salih Yoluç	Aston Martin Vantage AMR GTE	M	113	+16 laps
24	LMGTE Am	90	(United Kingdom) TF Sport	(United Kingdom) Jonathan Adam (Republic of Ireland) Charlie Eastwood (Turkey) Salih Yoluç	Aston Martin 4.0L Turbo V8	M	113	+16 laps
25	LMGTE Am	62	(United Kingdom) Red River Sport	(United Kingdom) Bonamy Grimes (United Kingdom) Charles Hollings (United Kingdom) Johnny Mowlem	Ferrari 488 GTE EVO	M	113	+16 laps
25	LMGTE Am	62	(United Kingdom) Red River Sport	(United Kingdom) Bonamy Grimes (United Kingdom) Charles Hollings (United Kingdom) Johnny Mowlem	Ferrari F154CB 4.0L Turbo V8	M	113	+16 laps
26	LMGTE Am	54	(Italy) AF Corse	(Italy) Francesco Castellacci (Italy) Giancarlo Fisichella (Switzerland) Thomas Flohr	Ferrari 488 GTE EVO	M	113	+16 laps
26	LMGTE Am	54	(Italy) AF Corse	(Italy) Francesco Castellacci (Italy) Giancarlo Fisichella (Switzerland) Thomas Flohr	Ferrari F154CB 4.0L Turbo V8	M	113	+16 laps
27	LMGTE Am	57	(Germany) Team Project 1	(Netherlands) Jeroen Bleekemolen (Brazil) Felipe Fraga (United States) Ben Keating	Porsche 911 RSR	M	112	+17 laps
27	LMGTE Am	57	(Germany) Team Project 1	(Netherlands) Jeroen Bleekemolen (Brazil) Felipe Fraga (United States) Ben Keating	Porsche 4.0L Flat 6	M	112	+17 laps
28	LMP1	6	(United Kingdom) Team LNT	(United Kingdom) Oliver Jarvis (United Kingdom) Michael Simpson (United Kingdom) Guy Smith	Ginetta G60-LT-P1	M	112	+17 Laps
28	LMP1	6	(United Kingdom) Team LNT	(United Kingdom) Oliver Jarvis (United Kingdom) Michael Simpson (United Kingdom) Guy Smith	AER P60C 2.4 L Turbo V6	M	112	+17 Laps
29	LMGTE Am	88	(Germany) Dempsey-Proton Racing	(Austria) Thomas Preining (Italy) Gianluca Giraudi (Mexico) Ricardo Sanchez	Porsche 911 RSR	M	111	+18 Laps
29	LMGTE Am	88	(Germany) Dempsey-Proton Racing	(Austria) Thomas Preining (Italy) Gianluca Giraudi (Mexico) Ricardo Sanchez	Porsche 4.0L Flat 6	M	111	+18 Laps
DNF	LMGTE Pro	71	(Italy) AF Corse	(Italy) Davide Rigon (Spain) Miguel Molina	Ferrari 488 GTE EVO	M	54	Collision
DNF	LMGTE Pro	71	(Italy) AF Corse	(Italy) Davide Rigon (Spain) Miguel Molina	Ferrari F154CB 4.0L Turbo V8	M	54	Collision
DNF	LMP2	22	(United Kingdom) United Autosports	(Portugal) Filipe Albuquerque (United Kingdom) Philip Hanson (United Kingdom) Paul di Resta	Oreca 07	M	2	Electrical issue
DNF	LMP2	22	(United Kingdom) United Autosports	(Portugal) Filipe Albuquerque (United Kingdom) Philip Hanson (United Kingdom) Paul di Resta	Gibson GK428 4.2 L V8	M	2	Electrical issue
