= 2019 4 Hours of Shanghai =

Sports car endurance race held at Shanghai International Circuit

Track map of the Shanghai International Circuit, in the Grand Prix Circuit Configuration

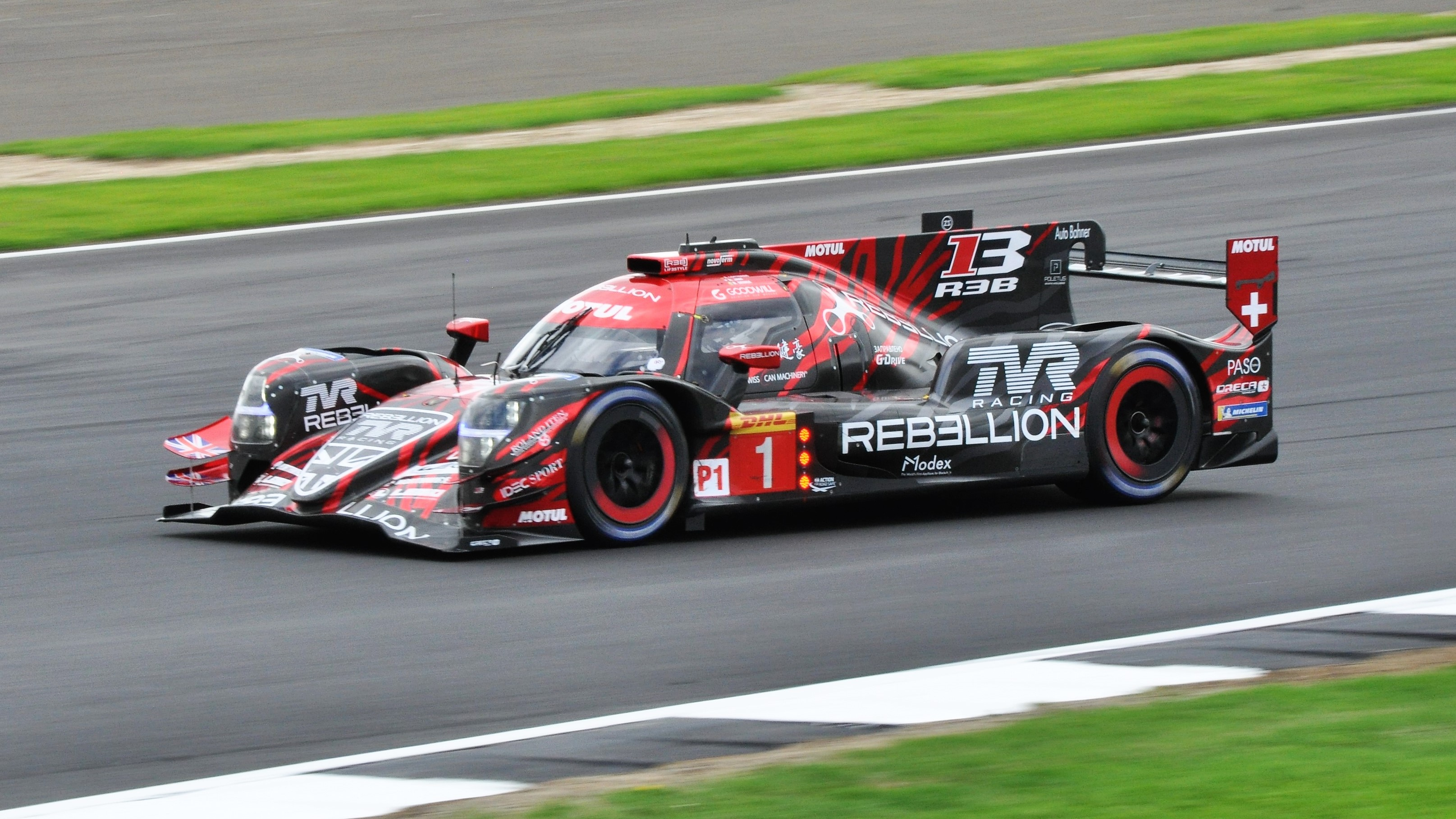
The overall race winner, the #1 Rebellion Racing Rebellion R13, pictured at Silverstone in 2018

The 2019 4 Hours of Shanghai was an endurance sportscar racing event held on 10 November 2019, as the third round of the 2019-20 FIA World Endurance Championship. This was the inaugural running of the race, in a four-hour format, having previously been run as the 6 Hours of Shanghai. The race was won overall by Bruno Senna, Gustavo Menezes, and Norman Nato, in the #1 Rebellion Racing Rebellion R13, with the race being the first win on the road for a non hybrid LMP1 since the first ever WEC race, the 2012 12 Hours of Sebring.

== Background ==
The provisional calendar for the 2019–20 FIA World Endurance Championship was unveiled at the 2018 6 Hours of Silverstone, featuring eight races, on five continents, starting at Silverstone in September 2019 with a four-hour race, and ending with the Le Mans 24 Hours in June 2020. It was noted that for first time in the FIA World Endurance Championship, 4 hour races would be introduced, at the Silverstone Circuit, and the Shanghai International Circuit, following a fan survey which was conducted by the championship despite an overwhelming preference being shown for 6 hour, 12 hour, and 24 hour races.

== Entry list ==
The entry list for the race was released on 10 October 2019, with 31 cars being split across the four classes. All five full-season LMP1 entries were listed, alongside 8 LMP2s, 6 GTE-Pro cars, and 12 cars in GTE-Am, with GTE Am having the #78 Proton Competition Porsche 911 RSR as an additional entry. Majority of the driving seats were displayed as being filled, with the exception of both Team LNT Ginetta G60-LT-P1s, which had no drivers, and the #88 Dempsey-Proton Racing, which had 2 empty seats. A 2nd entry list was released on 23 October 2019, with the Team LNT Ginetta seats being filled, with all drivers from the previous race returning, with the exception of Luca Ghiotto, who was replaced by Jordan King. On November 7, 2019, Will Bamber was announced to be driving in the #88 Dempsey-Proton Racing, alongside Thomas Preining.

== Qualifying ==
=== Qualifying Results ===
Pole position winners in each class are marked in bold.

Pos	Class	Team	Average Time	Gap	Grid
1	**LMP1**	**No 1. Rebellion Racing**	**1:45.892**	-	**1**
2	LMP1	No. 6 Team LNT	1:47.092	1.200	2
3	LMP1	No. 5 Team LNT	1:47.109	1.217	3
4	LMP1	No. 7 Toyota Gazoo Racing	1:47.235	1.343	4
5	LMP1	No. 8 Toyota Gazoo Racing	1:48.180	2.288	**5**
6	**LMP2**	**No. 42 Cool Racing**	1:48.649	2.757	6
7	LMP2	No. 37 Jackie Chan DC Racing	1:48.775	2.883	7
8	LMP2	No. 22 United Autosports	1:48.972	3.080	8
9	LMP2	No. 33 High Class Racing	1:49.245	3.353	9
10	LMP2	No. 38 Jota Sport	1:49.739	3.847	10
11	LMP2	No. 47 Cetilar Racing	1:50.496	4.604	11
12	LMP2	No. 36 Signatech Alpine Elf	1:50.941	5.049	12
13	**LMGTE-Pro**	**No. 92 Porsche GT Team**	**1:59.579**	**13.687**	**13**
14	LMGTE-Pro	No. 95 Aston Martin Racing	1:59.597	13.705	14
15	LMGTE-Pro	No. 97 Aston Martin Racing	1:59.607	13.715	15
16	LMGTE-Pro	No. 51 AF Corse	1:59.687	13.795	16
17	LMGTE-Pro	No. 71 AF Corse	2:00.067	14.175	17
18	LMGTE-Pro	No. 91 Porsche GT Team	2:00.224	14.332	18
19	**LMGTE-Am**	**No. 56 Team Project 1**	**2:00.824**	**14.932**	**19**
20	LMGTE-Am	No. 98 Aston Martin Racing	2:01.528	15.636	20
21	LMGTE-Am	No. 77 Dempsey-Proton Racing	2:01.655	15.763	21
22	LMGTE-Am	No. 90 TF Sport	2:02.192	16.300	22
23	LMGTE-Am	No. 57 Team Project 1	2:02.228	16.336	23
24	LMGTE-Am	No. 54 AF Corse	2:02.404	16.512	24
25	LMGTE-Am	No. 70 MR Racing	2:02.602	16.710	25
26	LMGTE-Am	No. 88 Dempsey-Proton Racing	2:02.714	16.822	26
27	LMGTE-Am	No. 86 Gulf Racing	2:02.978	17.086	27
28	LMGTE-Am	No. 83 AF Corse	2:03.001	17.109	28
29	LMGTE-Am	No. 78 Proton Competition	2:03.086	17.194	29
30	LMGTE-Am	No. 62 Red River Sport	2:03.239	17.347	30
31	LMP2	No. 29 Racing Team Nederland	1:48.431	+2.539	31

== Race ==
=== Race Result ===
The minimum number of laps for classification (70% of the overall winning car's race distance) was 88 laps. Class winners in bold.

Pos	Class	No	Team	Drivers	Chassis	Tyre	Laps	Time/Retired
Pos	Class	No	Team	Drivers	Engine	Tyre	Laps	Time/Retired
1	**LMP1**	**1**	**(Switzerland) Rebellion Racing**	**(Brazil) Bruno Senna (United States) Gustavo Menezes (France) Norman Nato**	**Rebellion R13**	MI	**125**	**4:00:59.195**
1	**LMP1**	**1**	**(Switzerland) Rebellion Racing**	**(Brazil) Bruno Senna (United States) Gustavo Menezes (France) Norman Nato**	**Gibson GL458 4.5 L V8**	MI	**125**	**4:00:59.195**
2	LMP1	8	(Japan) Toyota Gazoo Racing	(Switzerland) Sébastien Buemi (Japan) Kazuki Nakajima (New Zealand) Brendon Hartley	Toyota TS050 Hybrid	MI	125	+1:06.984
2	LMP1	8	(Japan) Toyota Gazoo Racing	(Switzerland) Sébastien Buemi (Japan) Kazuki Nakajima (New Zealand) Brendon Hartley	Toyota 2.4L Turbo V6	MI	125	+1:06.984
3	LMP1	7	(Japan) Toyota Gazoo Racing	(United Kingdom) Mike Conway (Japan) Kamui Kobayashi (Argentina) José María López	Toyota TS050 Hybrid	MI	124	+1 lap
3	LMP1	7	(Japan) Toyota Gazoo Racing	(United Kingdom) Mike Conway (Japan) Kamui Kobayashi (Argentina) José María López	Toyota 2.4L Turbo V6	MI	124	+1 lap
4	LMP1	5	(United Kingdom) Team LNT	(United Kingdom) Jordan King (United Kingdom) Ben Hanley (Russia) Egor Orudzhev	Ginetta G60-LT-P1	MI	124	+1 lap
4	LMP1	5	(United Kingdom) Team LNT	(United Kingdom) Jordan King (United Kingdom) Ben Hanley (Russia) Egor Orudzhev	AER P60C 2.4 L Turbo V6	MI	124	+1 lap
5	LMP1	6	(United Kingdom) Team LNT	(United Kingdom) Charlie Robertson (United Kingdom) Michael Simpson (United Kingdom) Guy Smith	Ginetta G60-LT-P1	MI	123	+2 laps
5	LMP1	6	(United Kingdom) Team LNT	(United Kingdom) Charlie Robertson (United Kingdom) Michael Simpson (United Kingdom) Guy Smith	AER P60C 2.4 L Turbo V6	MI	123	+2 laps
6	**LMP2**	**38**	**(United Kingdom) Jota Sport**	**(Portugal) António Félix da Costa** **(Mexico) Roberto González** **(United Kingdom) Anthony Davidson**	**Oreca 07**	G	**121**	**+4 laps**
6	**LMP2**	**38**	**(United Kingdom) Jota Sport**	**(Portugal) António Félix da Costa** **(Mexico) Roberto González** **(United Kingdom) Anthony Davidson**	**Gibson GK428 4.2 L V8**	G	**121**	**+4 laps**
7	LMP2	37	(China) Jackie Chan DC Racing	(China) Ho-Pin Tung (France) Gabriel Aubry (United Kingdom) Will Stevens	Oreca 07	G	121	+4 laps
7	LMP2	37	(China) Jackie Chan DC Racing	(China) Ho-Pin Tung (France) Gabriel Aubry (United Kingdom) Will Stevens	Gibson GK428 4.2 L V8	G	121	+4 laps
8	LMP2	22	(United Kingdom) United Autosports	(Portugal) Filipe Albuquerque (United Kingdom) Philip Hanson (United Kingdom) Paul di Resta	Oreca 07	MI	121	+4 laps
8	LMP2	22	(United Kingdom) United Autosports	(Portugal) Filipe Albuquerque (United Kingdom) Philip Hanson (United Kingdom) Paul di Resta	Gibson GK428 4.2 L V8	MI	121	+4 laps
9	LMP2	36	(France) Signatech Alpine Elf	(France) Thomas Laurent (Brazil) André Negrão (France) Pierre Ragues	Oreca 07	MI	120	+5 laps
9	LMP2	36	(France) Signatech Alpine Elf	(France) Thomas Laurent (Brazil) André Negrão (France) Pierre Ragues	Gibson GK428 4.2 L V8	MI	120	+5 laps
10	LMP2	29	(Netherlands) Racing Team Nederland	(Netherlands) Giedo van der Garde (Netherlands) Frits van Eerd (Netherlands) Nyck de Vries	Oreca 07	MI	120	+5 laps
10	LMP2	29	(Netherlands) Racing Team Nederland	(Netherlands) Giedo van der Garde (Netherlands) Frits van Eerd (Netherlands) Nyck de Vries	Gibson GK428 4.2 L V8	MI	120	+5 laps
11	LMP2	33	(Denmark) High Class Racing	(Denmark) Anders Fjordbach (United States) Mark Patterson (Japan) Kenta Yamashita	Oreca 07	G	120	+5 laps
11	LMP2	33	(Denmark) High Class Racing	(Denmark) Anders Fjordbach (United States) Mark Patterson (Japan) Kenta Yamashita	Gibson GK428 4.2 L V8	G	120	+5 laps
12	LMP2	47	(Italy) Cetilar Racing	(Italy) Andrea Belicchi (Italy) Roberto Lacorte (Italy) Giorgio Sernagiotto	Dallara P217	MI	119	+6 laps
12	LMP2	47	(Italy) Cetilar Racing	(Italy) Andrea Belicchi (Italy) Roberto Lacorte (Italy) Giorgio Sernagiotto	Gibson GK428 4.2 L V8	MI	119	+6 laps
13	**LMGTE Pro**	**51**	**(Italy) AF Corse**	**(United Kingdom) James Calado** **(Italy) Alessandro Pier Guidi**	**Ferrari 488 GTE EVO**	MI	**115**	**+10 laps**
13	**LMGTE Pro**	**51**	**(Italy) AF Corse**	**(United Kingdom) James Calado** **(Italy) Alessandro Pier Guidi**	**Ferrari F154CB 4.0L Turbo V8**	MI	**115**	**+10 laps**
14	LMGTE Pro	92	(Germany) Porsche GT Team	(Denmark) Michael Christensen (France) Kévin Estre	Porsche 911 RSR-19	MI	115	+10 laps
14	LMGTE Pro	92	(Germany) Porsche GT Team	(Denmark) Michael Christensen (France) Kévin Estre	Porsche 4.2L Flat-Six	MI	115	+10 laps
15	LMGTE Pro	91	(Germany) Porsche GT Team	(Italy) Gianmaria Bruni (Austria) Richard Lietz	Porsche 911 RSR-19	MI	115	+10 laps
15	LMGTE Pro	91	(Germany) Porsche GT Team	(Italy) Gianmaria Bruni (Austria) Richard Lietz	Porsche 4.2L Flat-Six	MI	115	+10 laps
16	LMGTE Pro	97	(United Kingdom) Aston Martin Racing	(United Kingdom) Alex Lynn (Belgium) Maxime Martin	Aston Martin Vantage AMR GTE	MI	115	+10 laps
16	LMGTE Pro	97	(United Kingdom) Aston Martin Racing	(United Kingdom) Alex Lynn (Belgium) Maxime Martin	Aston Martin 4.0L Turbo V8	MI	115	+10 laps
17	LMGTE Pro	95	(United Kingdom) Aston Martin Racing	(Denmark) Marco Sørensen (Denmark) Nicki Thiim	Aston Martin Vantage AMR GTE	MI	115	+10 laps
17	LMGTE Pro	95	(United Kingdom) Aston Martin Racing	(Denmark) Marco Sørensen (Denmark) Nicki Thiim	Aston Martin 4.0L Turbo V8	MI	115	+10 laps
18	LMGTE Pro	71	(Italy) AF Corse	(Italy) Davide Rigon (Spain) Miguel Molina	Ferrari 488 GTE EVO	MI	115	+10 laps
18	LMGTE Pro	71	(Italy) AF Corse	(Italy) Davide Rigon (Spain) Miguel Molina	Ferrari F154CB 4.0L Turbo V8	MI	115	+10 laps
19	**LMGTE Am**	**90**	**(United Kingdom) TF Sport**	**(United Kingdom) Jonathan Adam** **(Republic of Ireland) Charlie Eastwood** **(Turkey) Salih Yoluç**	**Aston Martin Vantage AMR GTE**	MI	**113**	**+12 laps**
19	**LMGTE Am**	**90**	**(United Kingdom) TF Sport**	**(United Kingdom) Jonathan Adam** **(Republic of Ireland) Charlie Eastwood** **(Turkey) Salih Yoluç**	**Aston Martin 4.0L Turbo V8**	MI	**113**	**+12 laps**
20	LMGTE Am	57	(Germany) Team Project 1	(Netherlands) Jeroen Bleekemolen (Netherlands) Larry ten Voorde (United States) Ben Keating	Porsche 911 RSR	MI	113	+12 laps
20	LMGTE Am	57	(Germany) Team Project 1	(Netherlands) Jeroen Bleekemolen (Netherlands) Larry ten Voorde (United States) Ben Keating	Porsche 4.0L Flat 6	MI	113	+12 laps
21	LMGTE Am	98	(United Kingdom) Aston Martin Racing	(Canada) Paul Dalla Lana (United Kingdom) Darren Turner (United Kingdom) Ross Gunn	Aston Martin Vantage AMR GTE	MI	113	+12 laps
21	LMGTE Am	98	(United Kingdom) Aston Martin Racing	(Canada) Paul Dalla Lana (United Kingdom) Darren Turner (United Kingdom) Ross Gunn	Aston Martin 4.0L Turbo V8	MI	113	+12 laps
22	LMGTE Am	83	(Italy) AF Corse	(France) Emmanuel Collard (Denmark) Nicklas Nielsen (France) François Perrodo	Ferrari 488 GTE EVO	MI	113	+12 laps
22	LMGTE Am	83	(Italy) AF Corse	(France) Emmanuel Collard (Denmark) Nicklas Nielsen (France) François Perrodo	Ferrari F154CB 4.0L Turbo V8	MI	113	+12 laps
23	LMGTE Am	56	(Germany) Team Project 1	(Italy) Matteo Cairoli (Denmark) David Heinemeier Hansson (Norway) Egidio Perfetti	Porsche 911 RSR	MI	112	+13 laps
23	LMGTE Am	56	(Germany) Team Project 1	(Italy) Matteo Cairoli (Denmark) David Heinemeier Hansson (Norway) Egidio Perfetti	Porsche 4.0L Flat 6	MI	112	+13 laps
24	LMGTE Am	88	(Germany) Dempsey-Proton Racing	(Austria) Thomas Preining (New Zealand) Will Bamber (Italy) Angelo Negro	Porsche 911 RSR	MI	112	+13 laps
24	LMGTE Am	88	(Germany) Dempsey-Proton Racing	(Austria) Thomas Preining (New Zealand) Will Bamber (Italy) Angelo Negro	Porsche 4.0L Flat 6	MI	112	+13 laps
25	LMGTE Am	70	(Japan) MR Racing	(Monaco) Olivier Beretta (Japan) Kei Cozzolino (Japan) Motoaki Ishikawa	Ferrari 488 GTE EVO	MI	112	+13 laps
25	LMGTE Am	70	(Japan) MR Racing	(Monaco) Olivier Beretta (Japan) Kei Cozzolino (Japan) Motoaki Ishikawa	Ferrari F154CB 4.0L Turbo V8	MI	112	+13 laps
26	LMGTE Am	54	(Italy) AF Corse	(Italy) Francesco Castellacci (Italy) Giancarlo Fisichella (Switzerland) Thomas Flohr	Ferrari 488 GTE EVO	MI	112	+13 laps
26	LMGTE Am	54	(Italy) AF Corse	(Italy) Francesco Castellacci (Italy) Giancarlo Fisichella (Switzerland) Thomas Flohr	Ferrari F154CB 4.0L Turbo V8	MI	112	+13 laps
27	LMGTE Am	86	(United Kingdom) Gulf Racing	(United Kingdom) Ben Barker (United Kingdom) Michael Wainwright (United Kingdom) Andrew Watson	Porsche 911 RSR	MI	112	+13 laps
27	LMGTE Am	86	(United Kingdom) Gulf Racing	(United Kingdom) Ben Barker (United Kingdom) Michael Wainwright (United Kingdom) Andrew Watson	Porsche 4.0L Flat 6	MI	112	+13 laps
28	LMGTE Am	62	(United Kingdom) Red River Sport	(United Kingdom) Bonamy Grimes (United Kingdom) Charles Hollings (United Kingdom) Johnny Mowlem	Ferrari 488 GTE EVO	MI	112	+13 laps
28	LMGTE Am	62	(United Kingdom) Red River Sport	(United Kingdom) Bonamy Grimes (United Kingdom) Charles Hollings (United Kingdom) Johnny Mowlem	Ferrari F154CB 4.0L Turbo V8	MI	112	+13 laps
29 (Note: The No. 77 Dempsey-Proton Competition was penalised 1 lap and 53.707 seconds by the stewards after the race due to exceeding the dry-weather tyre allocation (24 instead of 22 tyres used).)	LMGTE Am	77	(Germany) Dempsey-Proton Racing	(Australia) Matt Campbell (Italy) Riccardo Pera (Germany) Christian Ried	Porsche 911 RSR	MI	111	+14 laps
29	LMGTE Am	77	(Germany) Dempsey-Proton Racing	(Australia) Matt Campbell (Italy) Riccardo Pera (Germany) Christian Ried	Porsche 4.0L Flat 6	MI	111	+14 laps
30	LMGTE Am	78	(Germany) Proton Competition	(Monaco) Philippe Prette (Monaco) Louis Prette (France) Vincent Abril	Porsche 911 RSR	MI	107	+18 laps
30	LMGTE Am	78	(Germany) Proton Competition	(Monaco) Philippe Prette (Monaco) Louis Prette (France) Vincent Abril	Porsche 4.0L Flat 6	MI	107	+18 laps
Ret	LMP2	42	(Switzerland) Cool Racing	(Switzerland) Antonin Borga (Switzerland) Alexandre Coigny (France) Nicolas Lapierre	Oreca 07	MI	30	Not classified
Ret	LMP2	42	(Switzerland) Cool Racing	(Switzerland) Antonin Borga (Switzerland) Alexandre Coigny (France) Nicolas Lapierre	Gibson GK428 4.2 L V8	MI	30	Not classified
