= Porsche 911 RSR (2017) =

Racing car by Porsche

Porsche 911 RSR (991) 2017
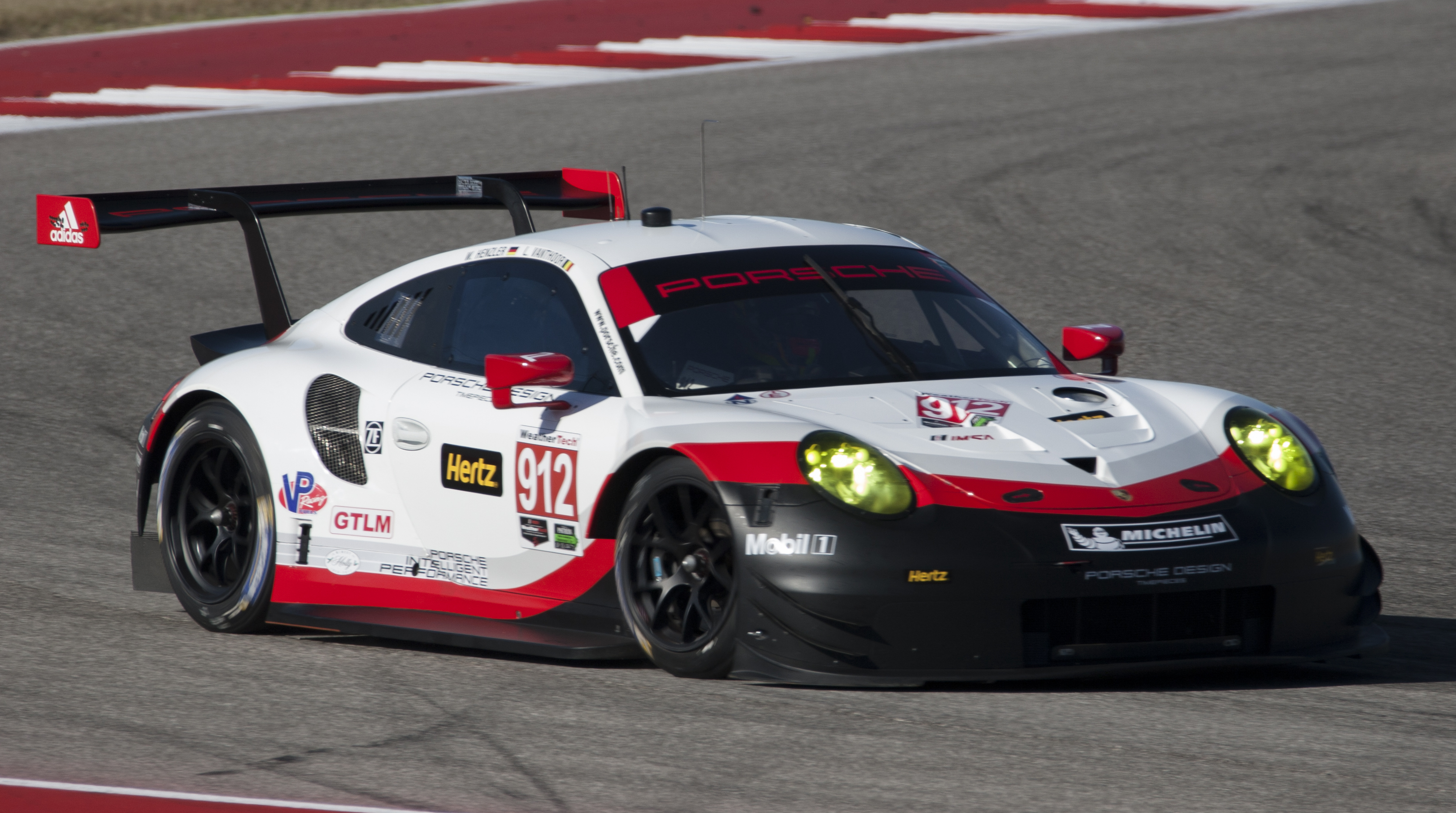
- The No. 912 Porsche GT Team 911 RSR during the 2017 Advance Auto Parts Sportscar Showdown
- Category: GT Endurance (IMSA WeatherTech SportsCar GTLM and FIA WEC GTE Pro and GTE Am)
- Constructor: Porsche
- Designer: Grant Larson
- Predecessor: Porsche 911 RSR (991)
- Successor: Porsche 911 RSR-19

Technical specifications
- Chassis: Carbon-fibre monocoque with safety roll cage
- Length: 4,557 mm (179 in)
- Width: 2,048 mm (81 in)
- Height: 1,040 mm (41 in)
- Wheelbase: 2,516 mm (99 in)
- Engine: Porsche M97/80 3,996 cc (244 cu in) flat-6 naturally-aspirated, 9,500 rpm maximum revolutions mid-engine, rear-wheel-drive
- Torque: 360.3 lb⋅ft (489 N⋅m)
- Transmission: 6-speed sequential semi-automatic paddle shift
- Power: 510 PS (375 kW; 503 hp)
- Weight: 1,245 kg (2,745 lb)
- Fuel: FIA World Endurance Championship: Shell V-Power (2017) later Total (2018-2019) IMSA WeatherTech Sports Car Championship: VP Racing Fuels
- Lubricants: Mobil 1
- Brakes: ventilated steel discs
- Tyres: Michelin; Dunlop

Competition history
- Notable entrants: (United States) Porsche GT Team (Germany) Dempsey-Proton Racing (Germany) Porsche GT Team (Germany) Team Project 1 (United Kingdom) Gulf Racing (Italy) EbiMotors
- Notable drivers: (France) Patrick Pilet (Germany) Dirk Werner (France) Frédéric Makowiecki (United Kingdom) Nick Tandy (Belgium) Laurens Vanthoor (France) Kévin Estre (Austria) Richard Lietz (Germany) Wolf Henzler (Italy) Gianmaria Bruni (New Zealand) Earl Bamber (France) Mathieu Jaminet (Denmark) Michael Christensen (Germany) Jörg Bergmeister (United States) Patrick Lindsey (Norway) Egidio Perfetti (Australia) Matt Campbell (Germany) Christian Ried (France) Julien Andlauer (Italy) Riccardo Pera (Italy) Matteo Cairoli (Italy) Giorgio Roda (United Arab Emirates) Khaled Al Qubaisi (Italy) Gianluca Roda (Japan) Satoshi Hoshino (United Kingdom) Michael Wainwright (United Kingdom) Ben Barker (Australia) Alex Davison (Austria) Thomas Preining (Germany) David Kolkmann (Denmark) David Heinemeier Hansson (Germany) Laurents Hörr (Netherlands) Larry ten Voorde (Netherlands) Jeroen Bleekemolen (United States) Ben Keating (Brazil) Felipe Fraga (Luxembourg) Dylan Pereira (Norway) Dennis Olsen (Italy) Gianluca Giraudi (Mexico) Ricardo Sánchez (Belgium) Adrien de Leener (New Zealand) Will Bamber (Italy) Angelo Negro (United States) Bret Curtis (Switzerland) Lucas Légeret (United States) Dominique Bastien (Germany) Marco Holzer (New Zealand) Jaxon Evans (United Kingdom) Andrew Watson (Belgium) Alessio Picariello (Germany) Marvin Dienst (Germany) Marc Lieb (Italy) Fabio Babini (France) Raymond Narac (United States) Bret Curtis (Italy) Marco Frezza (Italy) Sébastien Fortuna (Germany) Edward-Lewis Brauner (Austria) Horst Felbermayr Jr (Germany) Marco Seefried (Germany) Steffen Görig (Italy) Michele Beretta (Belgium) Alessio Picariello (Republic of Ireland) Michael Fassbender (Germany) Felipe Fernández Laser
- Debut: 2017 24 Hours of Daytona (IMSA SportsCar Championship); 2017 6 Hours of Silverstone (FIA WEC)
- First win: 2017 Northeast Grand Prix
- Last win: 2020 8 Hours of Bahrain
- Last event: 2020 8 Hours of Bahrain
Races	Wins	Podiums	Poles	F/Laps
75	27	81	29	17
- Teams' Championships: 4 (2018 ELMS, 2018-19 FIA WEC (LMGTE Am), 2019 IMSA SCC, 2020 ELMS)
- Constructors' Championships: 2 (2018-19 FIA WEC, 2019 IMSA SCC)
- Drivers' Championships: 5 (2018 ELMS, 2018-19 FIA WEC, 2018-19 FIA WEC (LMGTE Am), 2019 IMSA SCC, 2020 ELMS)

The 2017 version of the Porsche 911 RSR is a racing car developed by Porsche to compete in the LM GTE categories of the Automobile Club de l'Ouest sanctioned FIA World Endurance Championship, European Le Mans Series and GTLM class, of the International Motor Sports Association's IMSA WeatherTech SportsCar Championship. It serves as the replacement for the Porsche 911 RSR (991). The car was unveiled in November 2016 at the Los Angeles Auto Show.

The 911 RSR clinched its first victory at the Northeast Grand Prix in July 2017 on Lime Rock Park.

The 911 RSR was developed into a licensed LEGO Technic scale model, released for purchase by the public in 2019.

== Development ==
In May 2016, the first images of the new car were shown in a press release, with the photographs issued only focusing on the front half of the car, igniting speculation that the car would be the first mid-engined 911 race car. Further reports by the German Auto magazine Auto motor und sport supported the speculation, claiming that Porsche had received a technical waiver from the FIA to move the engine forwards, and that Porsche had wanted to base its new GTE Class contender on the Porsche 918 Spyder, but it had been found to be too costly. In October 2016, the unmarked car was spotted testing at the Sebring International Raceway, in Florida. Spy photographs of the car showed a massive diffuser, compared with the current car being campaigned, and a series of air extractors located on the "window panel", suggesting it was mid-engined.

The car was then launched at the 2016 LA Auto Show. At the launch of the car, it was revealed that Porsche did not actually seek, and the car never required any waiver, as the car had been fully legal and within the 2017 GTE rules.

== Competition history ==
=== Complete IMSA SportsCar Championship results ===
(key) Races in bold indicates pole position. Races in italics indicates fastest lap.

Complete IMSA SportsCar Championship results
Year	Entrant	Class	Drivers	No.	Rds.	Rounds											Pts.	Pos.
Year	Entrant	Class	Drivers	No.	Rds.	1	2	3	4	5	6	7	8	9	10	11	Pts.	Pos.
2017	(United States) Porsche GT Team	GTLM	(France) Patrick Pilet (Germany) Dirk Werner (France) Frédéric Makowiecki (United Kingdom) Nick Tandy	911	All; All; 1-2; 11	DAY; 2	SEB; 7	LBH; 6	AUS; 4	WGL; 7	MOS; **7**	LIM; 1	ELK; 8	VIR; 8	LGA; 3	ATL; 6	295	5th
2017	(United States) Porsche GT Team	GTLM	(Belgium) Laurens Vanthoor (France) Kévin Estre (Austria) Richard Lietz (Germany) Wolf Henzler (Italy) Gianmaria Bruni (New Zealand) Earl Bamber	912	All; 1-3; 1-2, 4; 6-11	DAY; 6	SEB; 8	LBH; 3	AUS; 8	WGL; 6	MOS; 6	LIM; **2**	ELK; 2	VIR; 7	LGA; 7	ATL; 5	287	6th
2018	(United States) Porsche GT Team	GTLM	(France) Patrick Pilet (United Kingdom) Nick Tandy (France) Frédéric Makowiecki	911	All; All; 1-2, 11	DAY; 8	SEB; 1	LBH; 6	MOH; 6	WGL; 3	MOS; **4**	LIM; 5	ELK; 5	VIR; 8	LGA; 8	ATL; 1	299	7th
2018	(United States) Porsche GT Team	GTLM	(New Zealand) Earl Bamber (Belgium) Laurens Vanthoor (Italy) Gianmaria Bruni (France) Mathieu Jaminet	912	All; All; 1-2; 11	DAY; 6	SEB; 3	LBH; 7	MOH; 1	WGL; 4	MOS; 6	LIM; 3	ELK; 4	VIR; 5	LGA; 2	ATL; 6	308	5th
2019	(United States) Porsche GT Team	GTLM	(France) Patrick Pilet (United Kingdom) Nick Tandy (France) Frédéric Makowiecki	911	All; All; 1-2, 11	DAY; **5**	SEB; **1**	LBH; **5**	MOH; 3	WGL; 1	MOS; 3	LIM; 4	ELK; 7	VIR; 1	LGA; 8	ATL; 6	317	2nd
2019	(United States) Porsche GT Team	GTLM	(New Zealand) Earl Bamber (Belgium) Laurens Vanthoor (France) Mathieu Jaminet	912	All; All; 1-2, 11	DAY; 3	SEB; 5	LBH; 1	MOH; 1	WGL; 6	MOS; 1	LIM; **2**	ELK; 3	VIR; **2**	LGA; 7	ATL; 5	330	1st

=== Complete World Endurance Championship results ===
(key) Races in bold indicates pole position. Races in italics indicates fastest lap.

Complete FIA World Endurance Championship results
Year	Entrant	Class	Drivers	No.	Rounds									Pts.	Pos.
Year	Entrant	Class	Drivers	No.	1	2	3	4	5	6	7	8	9	Pts.	Pos.
2017	(Germany) Porsche GT Team	LMGTE Pro	(Austria) Richard Lietz (France) Frédéric Makowiecki (France) Patrick Pilet	91	SIL; 3	SPA; 5	LMS; 3	NÜR; 2	MEX; 3	COA; 6	FUJ; **2**	SHA; 2	BHR; 4	145	3rd
2017	(Germany) Porsche GT Team	LMGTE Pro	(Denmark) Michael Christensen (France) Kévin Estre (Germany) Dirk Werner	92	SIL; Ret	SPA; 6	LMS; Ret	NÜR; **3**	MEX; 5	COA; 2	FUJ; 3	SHA; Ret	BHR; Ret	67	8th
2018 - 2019	(Germany) Porsche GT Team	LMGTE Pro	(Italy) Gianmaria Bruni (Austria) Richard Lietz (France) Frédéric Makowiecki	91	SPA; 4	LMS; **2**	SIL; DSQ	FUJ; 5	SHA; 2	SEB; 1	SPA; 8	LMS; 2		131	3rd
2018 - 2019	(Germany) Porsche GT Team	LMGTE Pro	(Denmark) Michael Christensen (France) Kévin Estre (Belgium) Laurens Vanthoor	92	SPA; 2	LMS; 1	SIL; 3	FUJ; 1	SHA; 3	SEB; **5**	SPA; 3	LMS; 9		155	1st
2018 - 2019	(Germany) Team Project 1	LMGTE Am	(Germany) Jörg Bergmeister (United States) Patrick Lindsey (Norway) Egidio Perfetti	56	SPA; 9	LMS; 7	SIL; **3**	FUJ; 1	SHA; 2	SEB; 3	SPA; 5	LMS; 1		151	1st
2018 - 2019	(Germany) Dempsey-Proton Racing	LMGTE Am	(Australia) Matt Campbell (Germany) Christian Ried (France) Julien Andlauer (Italy) Riccardo Pera	77	SPA; 4	LMS; 1	SIL; 1	FUJ; DSQ	SHA; 1	SEB; 1	SPA; 1	LMS; 4		110	2nd
2018 - 2019	(Germany) Dempsey-Proton Racing	LMGTE Am	(Italy) Matteo Cairoli (Italy) Giorgio Roda (United Arab Emirates) Khaled Al Qubaisi (Italy) Gianluca Roda (Japan) Satoshi Hoshino (Italy) Riccardo Pera	88	SPA; 6	LMS; **Ret**	SIL; 8	FUJ; DSQ	SHA; 3	SEB; 7	SPA; 9	LMS; **Ret**		26	9th
2018 - 2019	(United Kingdom) Gulf Racing	LMGTE Am	(United Kingdom) Michael Wainwright (United Kingdom) Ben Barker (Australia) Alex Davison (Austria) Thomas Preining	86	SPA; 7	LMS; 10	SIL; 6	FUJ; 4	SHA; 9	SEB; 4	SPA; 7	LMS; 8		79	6th
2019 - 2020	(Germany) Team Project 1	LMGTE Am	(Norway) Egidio Perfetti (Italy) Matteo Cairoli (Germany) David Kolkmann (Denmark) David Heinemeier Hansson (Germany) Laurents Hörr (Netherlands) Larry ten Voorde (Germany) Jörg Bergmeister	56	SIL; 6	FUJ; 7	SHA; **5**	BHR; 9	COTA; **3**	SPA; 4	LMN; 4	BHR; 1		118	3rd
2019 - 2020	(Germany) Team Project 1	LMGTE Am	(Netherlands) Jeroen Bleekemolen (United States) Ben Keating (Brazil) Felipe Fraga (Netherlands) Larry ten Voorde (Luxembourg) Dylan Pereira	57	SIL; 10	FUJ; 3	SHA; 2	BHR; **1**	COTA; 11	SPA; 6	LMN; 8	BHR; 6		101.5	5th
2019 - 2020	(Germany) Dempsey-Proton Racing	LMGTE Am	(Italy) Riccardo Pera (Germany) Christian Ried (Australia) Matt Campbell (Norway) Dennis Olsen	77	SIL; 5	FUJ; 5	SHA; 11	BHR; 6	COTA; 5	SPA; **2**	LMN; 2	BHR; 7		107.5	4th
2019 - 2020	(Germany) Dempsey-Proton Racing	LMGTE Am	(Austria) Thomas Preining (Italy) Gianluca Giraudi (Mexico) Ricardo Sánchez (Japan) Satoshi Hoshino (Belgium) Adrien de Leener (New Zealand) Will Bamber (Italy) Angelo Negro (United Arab Emirates) Khaled Al Qubaisi (United States) Bret Curtis (Switzerland) Lucas Légeret (United States) Dominique Bastien (Germany) Marco Holzer (New Zealand) Jaxon Evans	88	SIL; 11	FUJ; 9	SHA; 6	BHR; Ret	COTA; 9	SPA; 5	LMN; NC	BHR; 3		45.5	9th
2019 - 2020	(United Kingdom) Gulf Racing	LMGTE Am	(United Kingdom) Ben Barker (United Kingdom) Michael Wainwright (United Kingdom) Andrew Watson (Belgium) Alessio Picariello	86	SIL; 4	FUJ; 8	SHA; 9	BHR; 3	COTA; 6	SPA; 10	LMN; 5	BHR; 5		85	7th

=== Complete European Le Mans Series results ===
(key) Races in bold indicates pole position. Races in italics indicates fastest lap.

Complete European Le Mans Series results
Year	Entrant	Class	Drivers	No.	Rounds						Pts.	Pos.
Year	Entrant	Class	Drivers	No.	1	2	3	4	5	6	Pts.	Pos.
2018	(Germany) Proton Competition	LMGTE	(Germany) Marvin Dienst (Germany) Christian Ried (Norway) Dennis Olsen (Germany) Marc Lieb	77	LEC; 5	MNZ; 2	RBR; 4	**SIL**; **4**	SPA; 5	POR; 1	83	3rd
2018	(Germany) Proton Competition	LMGTE	(Italy) Gianluca Roda (Italy) Giorgio Roda (Italy) Matteo Cairoli (Italy) Gianmaria Bruni	88	**LEC**; **2**	MNZ; 5	RBR; 1	SIL; 2	**SPA**; **3**	POR; 3	95.5	1st
2018	(Italy) EbiMotors	LMGTE	(Italy) Fabio Babini (Italy) Riccardo Pera (France) Raymond Narac (United States) Bret Curtis	80	LEC; 3	**MNZ**; **3**	RBR; 3	SIL; Ret	SPA; 1	POR; Ret	58.5	5th
2018	(United Kingdom) Gulf Racing UK	LMGTE	(United Kingdom) Ben Barker (Australia) Alex Davison (United Kingdom) Michael Wainwright	86	LEC; Ret	MNZ	RBR	SIL; 5	SPA	POR	10	7th
2019	(Germany) Team Project 1	LMGTE	(Germany) Jörg Bergmeister (Norway) Egidio Perfetti (Italy) Giorgio Roda (Denmark) David Heinemeier Hansson	56	LEC; 8	MNZ; 4	BAR; 5	SIL	SPA	POR	26	9th
2019	(Germany) Dempsey-Proton Racing	LMGTE	(Italy) Matteo Cairoli (Italy) Riccardo Pera (Germany) Christian Ried	77	**LEC**; **3**	**MNZ**; **1**	BAR; 6	SIL; 7	**SPA**; **2**	**POR**; **Ret**	76	2nd
2019	(Italy) EbiMotors	LMGTE	(Italy) Fabio Babini (Italy) Marco Frezza (Italy) Sébastien Fortuna (Germany) Edward-Lewis Brauner (Italy) Gianluca Giraudi	80	LEC; 6	MNZ; 5	BAR; 7	SIL	SPA	POR; 3	39	7th
2019	(Germany) Proton Competition	LMGTE	(Austria) Thomas Preining (Austria) Horst Felbermayr Jr (Germany) Marco Seefried (Italy) Gianluca Giraudi (Mexico) Ricardo Sanchez (Belgium) Adrien De Leener (Germany) Steffen Görig	88	LEC; 7	MNZ; WD	BAR	**SIL**; **1**	SPA; WD	POR; Ret	32	8th
2020	(Germany) Proton Competition	LMGTE	(Italy) Michele Beretta (Belgium) Alessio Picariello (Germany) Christian Ried	77	RIC; 1	SPA; 6	**LEC**; **2**	MNZ; 2	POR; 1		99	1st
2020	(Germany) Proton Competition	LMGTE	(Republic of Ireland) Michael Fassbender (Germany) Felipe Fernández Laser (Austria) Richard Lietz	93	RIC; 7	**SPA**; **4**	LEC; DNS	MNZ; 5	POR; 4		47	5th
2020	(United Kingdom) Gulf Racing UK	LMGTE	(United Kingdom) Ben Barker (United Kingdom) Michael Wainwright (United Kingdom) Andrew Watson	86	RIC	SPA	LEC	MNZ	POR; Ret		0	NC
