= Riccardo Pera =

Italian racing driver (born 1999)

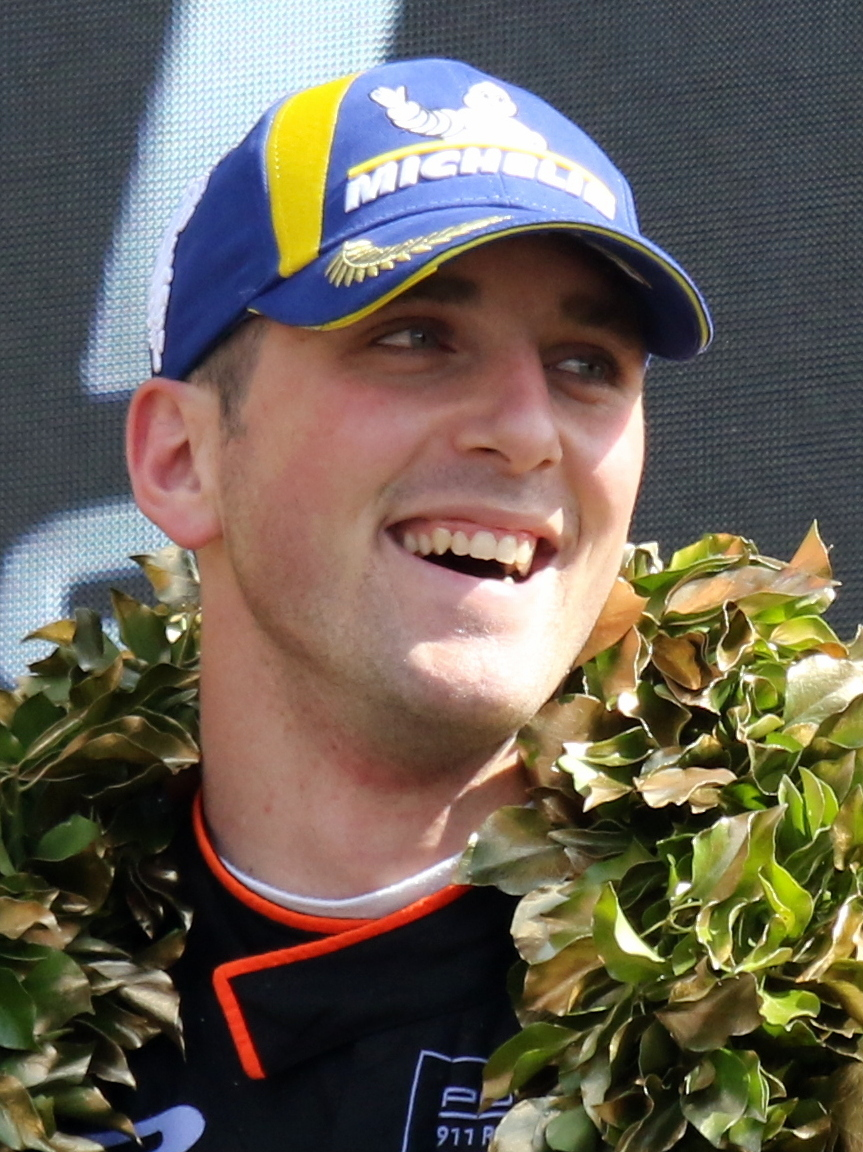
- Pera in 2023
- Nationality: (Italy) Italian
- Born: 4 July 1999 (age 27) Lucca, Italy

FIA World Endurance Championship career
- Debut season: 2018–19
- Current team: Manthey 1st Phorm
- Categorisation: FIA Silver (2017–2026); FIA Gold (2027–)
- Car number: 92
- Former teams: Project 1 Motorsport; Proton Competition; GR Racing
- Starts: 42 (43 entries)
- Wins: 5
- Podiums: 17
- Poles: 3
- Fastest laps: 0
- Best finish: 1st in 2025

Riccardo Pera (born 4 July 1999) is an Italian racing driver who competes in the FIA World Endurance Championship for Manthey 1st Phorm in the LMGT3 class. He previously finished as runner-up of the 2019 European Le Mans Series in the GTE class, was the 2021 champion of the Italian GT Sprint Championship in the GT4 Pro-Am category and runner-up in the 2024–25 Asian Le Mans Series in the GT class. He won the 2025 24 Hours of Le Mans in the LMGT3 class.

== Racing record ==
=== Career summary ===
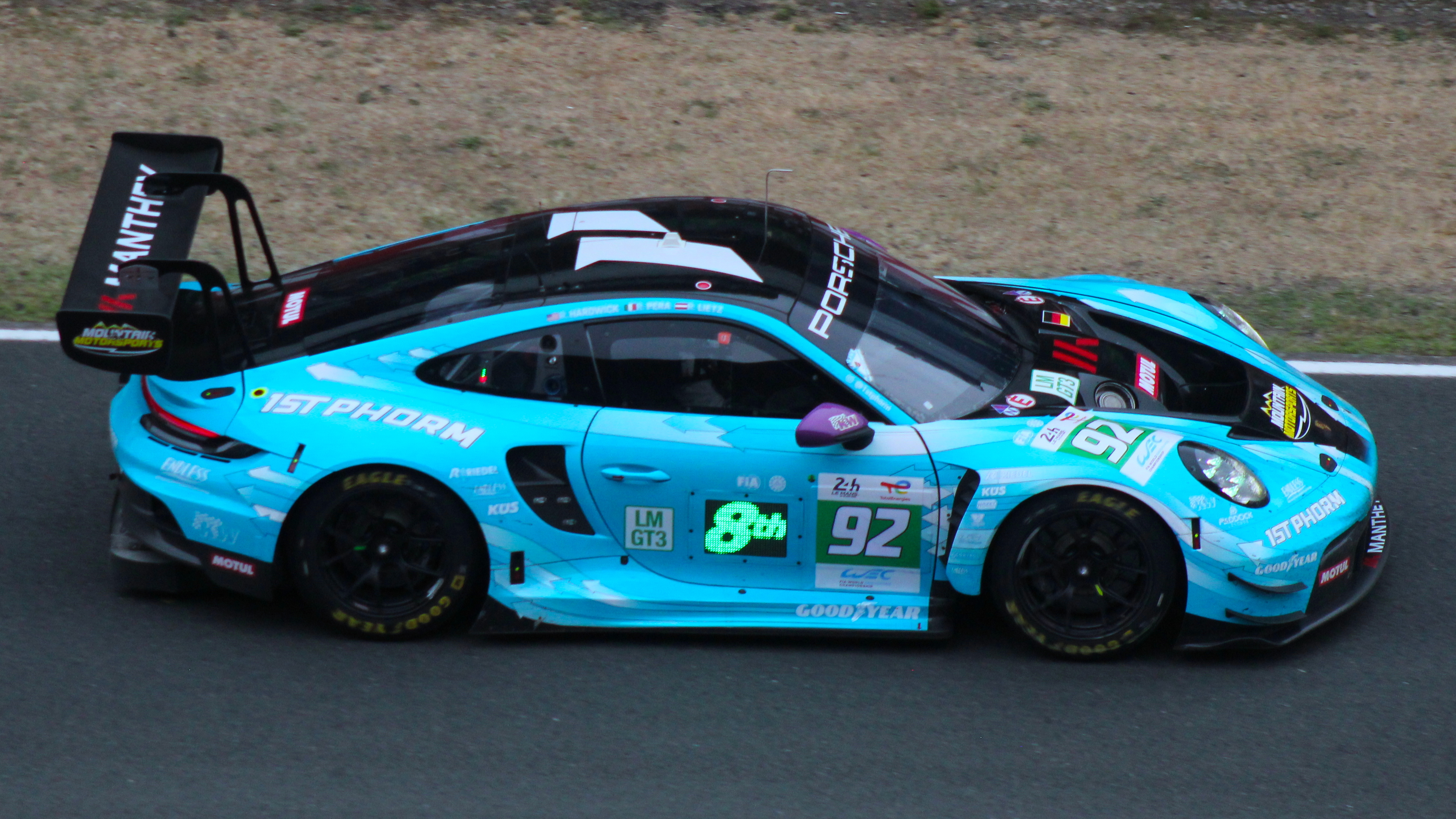
Pera's class-winning No. 92 car at the 2025 24 Hours of Le Mans

Season	Series	Team	Races	Wins	Poles	F/Laps	Podiums	Points	Position
2017	Porsche Carrera Cup Italia	EbiMotors	14	5	2	3	10	174	**2nd**
2018	European Le Mans Series - LMGTE	EbiMotors	6	1	1	2	4	58.5	7th
2018–19	FIA World Endurance Championship - LMGTE Am	Dempsey-Proton Racing	2	1	0	0	2	40	14th
2019	European Le Mans Series - LMGTE	Dempsey-Proton Racing	6	1	0	0	3	76	**2nd**
2019	Le Mans Cup - GT3	EbiMotors	1	0	0	0	1	18	11th
2019	Italian GT Sprint Championship - GT4	EbiMotors	2	1	0	0	2	32	9th
2019	Italian GT Endurance Championship - GT4	EbiMotors	2	1	1	1	2	32	5th
2019–20	FIA World Endurance Championship - LMGTE Am	Dempsey-Proton Racing	8	0	0	0	2	107.5	5th
2020	24 Hours of Le Mans - LMGTE Am	Dempsey-Proton Racing	1	0	0	0	1	N/A	**2nd**
2020	Porsche Carrera Cup Italia	EbiMotors	2	0	0	0	1	13	12th
2020	Italian GT Endurance Championship - GT3	EbiMotors	3	0	0	0	0	5	18th
2021	FIA World Endurance Championship - LMGTE Am	Team Project 1	5	0	0	0	3	78	4th
2021	24 Hours of Le Mans - LMGTE Am	Team Project 1	1	0	0	0	0	N/A	DNF
2021	Italian GT Sprint Championship - GT4 Pro-Am	EbiMotors	6	6	3	3	6	120	**1st**
2021	GT4 European Series - Pro-Am	EbiMotors	1	0	1	0	0	1	23rd
2022	FIA World Endurance Championship - LMGTE Am	GR Racing	5	0	0	0	0	50	10th
2022	24 Hours of Le Mans - LMGTE Am	GR Racing	1	0	0	0	0	N/A	4th
2022	Italian GT Sprint Championship - GT Cup	EbiMotors	6	2	1	1	3	0	NC†
2023	FIA World Endurance Championship - LMGTE Am	GR Racing	7	0	0	0	2	64	6th
2023	24 Hours of Le Mans - LMGTE Am	GR Racing	1	0	0	0	1	N/A	**3rd**
2023	Porsche Supercup	Ombra Racing	2	0	0	0	0	8	21st
2023	Italian GT Sprint Championship - GT Cup Pro-Am	Ombra Racing	3	0	1	1	2	0	NC†
2023–24	Asian Le Mans Series - GT	GR Racing	4	0	0	1	0	6	25th
2024	European Le Mans Series - LMGT3	GR Racing	6	0	0	0	2	64	5th
2024	24 Hours of Le Mans - LMGT3	GR Racing	1	0	0	0	0	N/A	12th
2024-25	Asian Le Mans Series - GT	Manthey EMA	6	1	0	1	3	76	**2nd**
2025	FIA World Endurance Championship - LMGT3	Manthey 1st Phorm	8	2	0	0	2	123	**1st**
2025	24 Hours of Le Mans - LMGT3	Manthey 1st Phorm	1	1	0	0	1	N/A	**1st**
2025	24H Series - 992	Ebimotors	1	0	1	0	0	24	NC†
2025	European Le Mans Series - LMGT3	GR Racing	6	0	0	0	2	44	8th
2025	GT World Challenge Europe Endurance Cup	Lionspeed GP	1	0	0	0	0	0	NC
2025-26	Asian Le Mans Series - GT	Manthey Racing	6	0	0	0	0	38	10th
2026	IMSA SportsCar Championship - GTD	Manthey 1st Phorm	5	1	0	0	2	1189	30th
2026	FIA World Endurance Championship - LMGT3	The Bend Manthey	7	1	0	1	4	74*	**3rd***
2026	GT World Challenge Europe Endurance Cup	Rutronik Racing	3	0	0	0	0	0	NC
2026	GT4 European Series - Pro-Am	Ebimotors	2	0	0	0	1	15*	14th*
2026	GT World Challenge Europe Sprint Cup	Pure Rxcing	4	0	0	0	0	0	NC
2026	GT World Challenge America - Pro-Am	GMG Racing	1	1	1	1	1	0	NC†

^{†} As Pera was a guest driver, he was ineligible to score points.
^{*} Season still in progress.

=== Complete European Le Mans Series results ===
Year	Entrant	Class	Chassis	Engine	1	2	3	4	5	6	Rank	Points
2018	EbiMotors	LMGTE	Porsche 911 RSR	Porsche 4.0 L Flat-6	LEC; 3	**MNZ**; 3	RBR; 3	SIL; Ret	SPA; 1‡	ALG; Ret	8th	58.5
2019	Dempsey-Proton Racing	LMGTE	Porsche 911 RSR	Porsche 4.0 L Flat-6	LEC; 3	**MNZ**; 1	CAT; 6	SIL; 7	**SPA**; 2	**ALG**; Ret	2nd	76
2024	GR Racing	LMGT3	Ferrari 296 GT3	Ferrari F163CE 3.0 L Turbo V6	CAT; 2	LEC; 5	IMO; 7	SPA; 2	MUG; 8	ALG; 6	5th	64
2025	GR Racing	LMGT3	Ferrari 296 GT3	Ferrari F163CE 3.0 L Turbo V6	CAT; 8	LEC; 3	IMO; Ret	SPA; 7	SIL; 2	ALG; 10	8th	44

^{‡} Half points awarded as less than 75% of race distance was completed.

=== Complete FIA World Endurance Championship results ===
(key) (Races in bold indicate pole position; races in italics indicate fastest lap)

Year	Entrant	Class	Chassis	Engine	1	2	3	4	5	6	7	8	Rank	Points
2018–19	Dempsey-Proton Racing	LMGTE Am	Porsche 911 RSR	Porsche 4.0 L Flat-6	SPA	LMS	SIL	FUJ	SHA; 3	SEB	SPA; 1	LMS	14th	40
2019–20	Dempsey-Proton Racing	LMGTE Am	Porsche 911 RSR	Porsche 4.0 L Flat-6	SIL; 5	FUJ; 5	SHA; 11	BHR; 6	COA; 5	**SPA**; 2	**LMS**; 2	BHR; 7	5th	107.5
2021	Team Project 1	LMGTE Am	Porsche 911 RSR-19	Porsche 4.2 L Flat-6	SPA; DNS	**ALG**; 2	MNZ; 4	LMS; Ret	BHR; 3	BHR; 3			4th	78
2022	GR Racing	LMGTE Am	Porsche 911 RSR-19	Porsche 4.2 L Flat-6	SEB	SPA; 6	LMS; 3	MNZ; 12	FUJ; 12	BHR; 6			10th	50
2023	GR Racing	LMGTE Am	Porsche 911 RSR-19	Porsche 4.2 L Flat-6	SEB; 7	PRT; 11	SPA; 12	LMS; 3	MNZ; 3	FUJ; 8	BHR; 8		6th	64
2025	Manthey 1st Phorm	LMGT3	Porsche 911 GT3 R (992)	Porsche 4.2 L Flat-6	QAT; 12	IMO; 1	SPA; 7	LMS; 1	SÃO; 6	COA; 7	FUJ; 5	BHR; 4	1st	123
2026	The Bend Manthey	LMGT3	Porsche 911 GT3 R (992.2)	Porsche 4.2 L Flat-6	IMO; 3	SPA; 3	LMS; 9	SÃO; 3	COA; 15	FUJ; 12	CAT; 1	MNZ	3rd*	74*

=== Complete 24 Hours of Le Mans results ===
Year	Team	Co-Drivers	Car	Class	Laps	Pos.	Class Pos.
2020	(Germany) Dempsey-Proton Racing	(Australia) Matt Campbell (Germany) Christian Ried	Porsche 911 RSR	GTE; Am	339	25th	**2nd**
2021	(Germany) Team Project 1	(Italy) Matteo Cairoli (Norway) Egidio Perfetti	Porsche 911 RSR-19	GTE; Am	84	DNF	DNF
2022	(United Kingdom) GR Racing	(United Kingdom) Ben Barker (United Kingdom) Michael Wainwright	Porsche 911 RSR-19	GTE; Am	340	37th	4th
2023	(United Kingdom) GR Racing	(United Kingdom) Ben Barker (United Kingdom) Michael Wainwright	Porsche 911 RSR-19	GTE; Am	312	29th	**3rd**
2024	(United Kingdom) GR Racing	(Brazil) Daniel Serra (United Kingdom) Michael Wainwright	Ferrari 296 GT3	LMGT3	278	39th	12th
2025	(Germany) Manthey 1st Phorm	(United States) Ryan Hardwick (Austria) Richard Lietz	Porsche 911 GT3 R (992)	LMGT3	341	33rd	**1st**
2026	(Germany) The Bend Manthey	(Austria) Richard Lietz (Australia) Yasser Shahin	Porsche 911 GT3 R (992.2)	LMGT3	330	45th	13th

=== Complete Asian Le Mans Series results ===
(key) (Races in bold indicate pole position) (Races in italics indicate fastest lap)

Year	Team	Class	Car	Engine	1	2	3	4	5	6	Pos.	Points
2023–24	GR Racing	GT	Ferrari 296 GT3	Ferrari F163CE 3.0 L Turbo V6	SEP; 1; 9	SEP; 2; 11	DUB; 8	ABU; 1 Ret	ABU; 2 WD		25th	6
2024–25	Manthey EMA	GT	Porsche 911 GT3 R (992)	Porsche M97/80 4.2 L Flat-6	SEP; 1; 3	SEP; 2; 13	DUB; 1; 2	DUB; 2; 5	ABU; 1; 1	ABU; 2; 7	2nd	76
2025–26	Manthey Racing	GT	Porsche 911 GT3 R (992)	Porsche M97/80 4.2 L Flat-6	SEP; 1; 4	SEP; 2; 8	DUB; 1; 9	DUB; 2; 4	ABU; 1; 7	ABU; 2; 12	10th	38

=== Complete GT World Challenge Europe results ===
==== GT World Challenge Europe Endurance Cup ====
(key) (Races in bold indicate pole position) (Races in italics indicate fastest lap)

Year	Team	Car	Class	1	2	3	4	5	6	7	Pos.	Points
2025	Lionspeed GP	Porsche 911 GT3 R (992)	Bronze	LEC	MNZ	SPA; 6H; 42	SPA; 12H; 12	SPA; 24H; 21	NÜR	CAT	13th	28
2026	Rutronik Racing	Porsche 911 GT3 R (992.2)	Bronze	LEC; 13	MNZ; 38†	SPA; 6H	SPA; 12H	SPA; 24H	NÜR; Ret	ALG	10th	33

==== GT World Challenge Europe Sprint Cup ====
(key) (Races in bold indicate pole position) (Races in italics indicate fastest lap)

Year	Team	Car	Class	1	2	3	4	5	6	7	8	9	10	Pos.	Points
2026	Pure Rxcing	Porsche 911 GT3 R (992.2)	Silver	BRH; 1	BRH; 2	MIS; 1; 34	MIS; 2; 28	MAG; 1	MAG; 2	ZAN; 1; 37	ZAN; 2; 33	CAT; 1	CAT; 2	13th	3

=== Complete IMSA SportsCar Championship results ===
(key) (Races in bold indicate pole position) (Races in italics indicate fastest lap)

Year	Entrant	Class	Car	Engine	1	2	3	4	5	6	7	8	9	10	Pos.	Points
2026	Manthey 1st Phorm	GTD	Porsche 911 GT3 R (992.2)	Porsche M97/80 4.2 L Flat-6	DAY; 12	SEB; 19	LBH	LGA	WGL; 1	MOS	ELK; 16	VIR	IMS	PET; 2	30th	1189
