= Michael Wainwright (racing driver) =

British racing driver & businessman

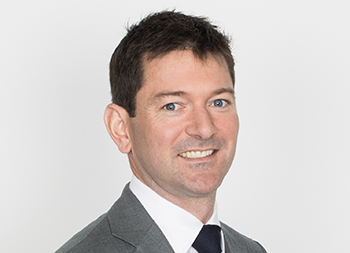
- Mike Wainwright as COO of Trafigura
- Nationality: (United Kingdom) British
- Born: Michael Stuart Wainwright; 25 July 1973 (age 53) Worcester, United Kingdom

FIA World Endurance Championship career
- Debut season: 2016
- Current team: GR Racing
- Categorisation: FIA Bronze
- Car number: 86
- Former teams: Gulf Racing
- Starts: 44 (44 entries)
- Wins: 0
- Podiums: 2
- Poles: 0
- Fastest laps: 0
- Best finish: 7th in 2016, 2017, 2018–19

Michael Stuart Wainwright (born 25 July 1973) is a British racing driver and oil businessman who competes in the FIA World Endurance Championship for GR Racing.

Wainwright made his professional career at oil trading company Trafigura from 1996 to 2023. Being the protégé of the company's founder Claude Dauphin, he ultimately served as COO of the group based in Geneva. He is listed among the 300 wealthiest individuals of Switzerland, with an estimated fortune of 300-400 millions swiss francs. In 2022, following a very profitable year on the oil market following the Russian invasion of Ukraine, he acquired a property in Geneva for 49.5 million swiss francs.

In December 2023, Wainwright was charged by the Swiss Federal Criminal Court and the US Department of Justice over allegations of bribing public officials in Angola and Brazil, together with two other individuals. In January 2025, he was sentenced to 32 months in prison on charges of bribery, with 20 months being suspended.

== Racing record ==
=== Career summary ===
Season	Series	Team	Races	Wins	Poles	F/Laps	Podiums	Points	Position
2010	24H Series - A2	Team First 2	1	0	0	0	0	0	NC†
2010	French GT Championship	Team First	4	0	0	0	0	0	NC†
2010	FIA GT3 European Championship	Gulf Team First	1	0	0	0	0	0	NC†
2011	Intercontinental Le Mans Cup - LMGTE Am	Gulf AMR Middle East	5	0	0	0	0	0	NC†
2011	24 Hours of Le Mans - LMGTE Am	Gulf AMR Middle East	1	0	0	0	0	N/A	DNF
2011	American Le Mans Series - GT	Gulf AMR Middle East	1	0	0	0	0	0	NC†
2011	24 Hours of Dubai - A6	Gulf Team First	1	0	0	0	0	N/A	14th
2012	Blancpain Endurance Series - Pro-Am	Gulf Racing UK	5	0	0	0	0	0	NC
2012	Blancpain Endurance Series - Pro	Gulf Racing UK	1	0	0	0	0	1	27th
2012	24 Hours of Dubai - A6	Gulf Racing	1	0	0	0	0	N/A	DNF
2013	Blancpain Endurance Series - Pro-Am	Gulf Racing UK	4	0	0	0	0	0	NC
2013	Gulf 12 Hours - GT3 Pro-Am	Gulf Racing	1	0	0	0	0	N/A	5th
2014	European Le Mans Series - LMGTE	Gulf Racing UK	5	0	0	0	0	28	11th
2015	European Le Mans Series - LMGTE	Gulf Racing UK	5	1	0	0	2	56	4th
2016	FIA World Endurance Championship - LMGTE Am	Gulf Racing	9	0	0	0	0	106	7th
2016	24 Hours of Le Mans - LMGTE Am	Gulf Racing	1	0	0	0	0	N/A	5th
2017	FIA World Endurance Championship - LMGTE Am	Gulf Racing	7	0	0	0	1	67	7th
2017	24 Hours of Le Mans - LMGTE Am	Gulf Racing	1	0	0	0	0	N/A	10th
2018	European Le Mans Series - LMGTE	Gulf Racing UK	2	0	0	0	0	10	12th
2018	24 Hours of Le Mans - LMGTE Am	Gulf Racing	1	0	0	0	0	N/A	10th
2018–19	FIA World Endurance Championship - LMGTE Am	Gulf Racing UK	8	0	0	0	0	79	7th
2019	24 Hours of Le Mans - LMGTE Am	Gulf Racing	1	0	0	0	0	N/A	8th
2019–20	FIA World Endurance Championship - LMGTE Am	Gulf Racing	8	0	0	0	1	85	9th
2020	European Le Mans Series - GTE	Gulf Racing UK	1	0	0	0	0	0	NC†
2020	24 Hours of Le Mans - LMGTE Am	Gulf Racing UK	1	0	0	0	0	N/A	5th
2021	FIA World Endurance Championship - LMGTE Am	GR Racing	6	0	0	0	0	23	15th
2021	24 Hours of Le Mans - LMGTE Am	GR Racing	1	0	0	0	0	N/A	14th
2022	FIA World Endurance Championship - LMGTE Am	GR Racing	5	0	0	0	0	50	10th
2022	24 Hours of Le Mans - LMGTE Am	GR Racing	1	0	0	0	0	N/A	4th
2023	FIA World Endurance Championship - LMGTE Am	GR Racing	7	0	0	0	2	64	6th
2023	24 Hours of Le Mans - LMGTE Am	GR Racing	1	0	0	0	1	N/A	**3rd**
2023–24	Asian Le Mans Series - GT	GR Racing	4	0	0	0	0	6	25th
2024	European Le Mans Series - GT3	GR Racing	6	0	0	0	2	64	5th
2024	24 Hours of Le Mans - LMGT3	GR Racing	1	0	0	0	0	N/A	12th
2025	European Le Mans Series - LMGT3	GR Racing	6	0	0	0	2	44	8th
2026	European Le Mans Series - LMGT3	GR Racing	6	1	0	0	2	52	7th

^{†} As Wainwright was a guest driver, he was ineligible to score points.
^{*} Season still in progress.

=== Complete European Le Mans Series results ===
(key) (Races in bold indicate pole position; races in italics indicate fastest lap)

Year	Entrant	Class	Chassis	Engine	1	2	3	4	5	6	Rank	Points
2014	Gulf Racing UK	GTE	Porsche 911 GT3 RSR	Porsche 4.0 L Flat-6	SIL; 9	IMO; 8	RBR; 9				11th	28
2014	Gulf Racing UK	GTE	Porsche 911 RSR	Porsche 4.0 L Flat-6				LEC; 6	EST; 4		11th	28
2015	Gulf Racing UK	GTE	Porsche 911 RSR	Porsche 4.0 L Flat-6	SIL; 1	IMO; 8	RBR; 7	LEC; 7	EST; 3		4th	56
2018	Gulf Racing	LMGTE	Porsche 911 RSR	Porsche 4.0 L Flat-6	LEC; Ret	MNZ	RBR	SIL; 5	SPA	ALG	7th	10
2020	Gulf Racing UK	LMGTE	Porsche 911 RSR	Porsche 4.0 L Flat-6	LEC	SPA	LEC	MNZ	ALG; Ret		NC	0
2024	GR Racing	LMGT3	Ferrari 296 GT3	Ferrari F163CE 3.0 L Turbo V6	CAT; 2	LEC; 5	IMO; 7	SPA; 2	MUG; 8	ALG; 6	5th	64
2025	GR Racing	LMGT3	Ferrari 296 GT3	Ferrari F163CE 3.0 L Turbo V6	CAT; 8	LEC; 3	IMO; Ret	SPA; 7	SIL; 2	ALG; 10	8th	44
2026	GR Racing	LMGT3	Ferrari 296 GT3 Evo	Ferrari F163CE 3.0 L Turbo V6	CAT; Ret	LEC; 3	IMO; 7	SPA; 1	SIL; 8	ALG; 9	7th	52

=== Complete FIA World Endurance Championship results ===
(key) (Races in bold indicate pole position; races in italics indicate fastest lap)

Year	Entrant	Class	Chassis	Engine	1	2	3	4	5	6	7	8	9	Rank	Points
2016	Gulf Racing	LMGTE Am	Porsche 911 RSR	Porsche 4.0 L Flat-6	SIL; Ret	SPA; 5	LMS; 3	NÜR; 5	MEX; 4	COA; 4	FUJ; 4	SHA; 6	BHR; 4	7th	106
2017	Gulf Racing	LMGTE Am	Porsche 911 RSR	Porsche 4.0 L Flat-6	SIL; 4	SPA; Ret	LMS; 5	NÜR; 5	MEX; 3	COA; Ret	FUJ; 4	SHA; 2	BHR; 5	6th	97
2018–19	Gulf Racing UK	LMGTE Am	Porsche 911 RSR	Porsche 4.0 L Flat-6	SPA; 7	LMS; 6	SIL; 6	FUJ; 4	SHA; 9	SEB; 4	SPA; 7	LMS; 4		7th	79
2019–20	Gulf Racing	LMGTE Am	Porsche 911 RSR	Porsche 4.0 L Flat-6	SIL; 4	FUJ; 8	SHA; 9	BHR; 3	COA; 6	SPA; 10	LMS; 5	BHR; 5		9th	85
2021	GR Racing	LMGTE Am	Porsche 911 RSR-19	Porsche 4.2 L Flat-6	SPA; Ret	ALG; 8	MNZ; 8	LMS; 9	BHR; 6	BHR; 9				15th	23
2022	GR Racing	LMGTE Am	Porsche 911 RSR-19	Porsche 4.2 L Flat-6	SEB	SPA; 6	LMS; 3	MNZ; 12	FUJ; 12	BHR; 6				10th	50
2023	GR Racing	LMGTE Am	Porsche 911 RSR-19	Porsche 4.2 L Flat-6	SEB; 7	PRT; 11	SPA; 12	LMS; 3	MNZ; 3	FUJ; 8	BHR; 8			6th	64

=== Complete 24 Hours of Le Mans results ===
Year	Team	Co-Drivers	Car	Class	Laps	Pos.	Class Pos.
2011	(United Arab Emirates) Gulf AMR Middle East	(France) Fabien Giroix (Germany) Roald Goethe	Aston Martin V8 Vantage GT2	GTE; Am	141	DNF	DNF
2016	(United Kingdom) Gulf Racing	(United Kingdom) Ben Barker (United Kingdom) Adam Carroll	Porsche 911 RSR	GTE; Am	328	33rd	5th
2017	(United Kingdom) Gulf Racing UK	(United Kingdom) Ben Barker (Australia) Nick Foster	Porsche 911 RSR	GTE; Am	328	38th	10th
2018	(United Kingdom) Gulf Racing	(United Kingdom) Ben Barker (Australia) Alex Davison	Porsche 911 RSR	GTE; Am	283	40th	10th
2019	(United Kingdom) Gulf Racing	(United Kingdom) Ben Barker (Austria) Thomas Preining	Porsche 911 RSR	GTE; Am	331	38th	8th
2020	(United Kingdom) Gulf Racing	(United Kingdom) Ben Barker (United Kingdom) Andrew Watson	Porsche 911 RSR	GTE; Am	337	29th	5th
2021	(United Kingdom) GR Racing	(United Kingdom) Ben Barker (United Kingdom) Tom Gamble	Porsche 911 RSR-19	GTE; Am	322	43rd	14th
2022	(United Kingdom) GR Racing	(United Kingdom) Ben Barker (Italy) Riccardo Pera	Porsche 911 RSR-19	GTE; Am	340	37th	4th
2023	(United Kingdom) GR Racing	(United Kingdom) Ben Barker (Italy) Riccardo Pera	Porsche 911 RSR-19	GTE; Am	312	29th	**3rd**
2024	(United Kingdom) GR Racing	(Italy) Riccardo Pera (Brazil) Daniel Serra	Ferrari 296 GT3	LMGT3	278	39th	12th
