= 2020 6 Hours of Spa-Francorchamps =

World Endurance Championship race in Belgium

Layout of the Circuit de Spa-Francorchamps

The 2020 Total 6 Hours of Spa-Francorchamps was an endurance sports car racing event held at the Circuit de Spa-Francorchamps, Stavelot, Belgium on 13–14 August 2020. The event was originally scheduled to be held on 25 April, but was postponed on 16 March due to the COVID-19 pandemic. Spa-Francorchamps served as the sixth race of the 2019–20 FIA World Endurance Championship, and was the ninth running of the event as part of the championship. The race was won by the #7 Toyota TS050 Hybrid.

== Qualifying ==
=== Qualifying results ===
Pole position winners in each class are marked in bold.

Pos	Class	Team	Average Time	Gap	Grid
1	**LMP1**	**No. 1 Rebellion Racing**	**1:59.577**	-	**1**
2	LMP1	No. 8 Toyota Gazoo Racing	2:00.417	+0.840	2
3	LMP1	No. 7 Toyota Gazoo Racing	2:01.070	+1.493	3
4	LMP1	No. 4 ByKolles Racing Team	2:01.907	+2.330	4
**5**	**LMP2**	**No. 22 United Autosports**	**2:02.148**	**+2.571**	**5**
6	LMP2	No. 38 Jota Sport	2:03.697	+4.120	6
7	LMP2	No. 42 Cool Racing	2:03.956	+4.379	7
8	LMP2	No. 37 Jackie Chan DC Racing	2:04.198	+4.621	8
9	LMP2	No. 36 Signatech Alpine Elf	2:04.235	+4.658	9
10	LMP2	No. 33 High Class Racing	2:04.710	+5.133	10
11	LMP2	No. 47 Cetilar Racing	2:05.547	+5.970	11
**12**	**LMGTE-Pro**	**No. 92 Porsche GT Team**	2:14.207	+14.630	12
13	LMGTE-Pro	No. 97 Aston Martin Racing	2:14.635	+15.058	13
14	LMGTE-Pro	No. 95 Aston Martin Racing	2:14.643	+15.066	14
15	LMGTE-Pro	No. 91 Porsche GT Team	2:14.923	+15.346	15
16	LMGTE-Pro	No. 71 AF Corse	2:15.356	+15.779	16
17	LMGTE-Pro	No. 51 AF Corse	2:15.383	+15.806	17
**18**	**LMGTE-Am**	**No. 77 Dempsey-Proton Racing**	**2:16.519**	**+16.942**	**17**
19	LMGTE-Am	No. 56 Team Project 1	2:16.649	+17.072	19
20	LMGTE-Am	No. 57 Team Project 1	2:17.145	+17.568	20
21	LMGTE-Am	No. 98 Aston Martin Racing	2:17.563	+17.986	21
22	LMGTE-Am	No. 83 AF Corse	2:17.593	+18.016	22
23	LMGTE-Am	No. 90 TF Sport	2:17.658	+18.081	23
24	LMGTE-Am	No. 54 AF Corse	2:18.314	+18.737	24
25	LMGTE-Am	No. 88 Dempsey-Proton Racing	2:18.841	+19.264	25
26	LMGTE-Am	No. 62 Red River Sport	2:18.945	+19.368	26
27	LMGTE-Am	No. 86 Gulf Racing	2:18.967	+19.370	27
28	LMP2	No. 35 Eurasia Motorsport	2:18.997	+19.420	28
29	LMP2	No. 29 Racing Team Nederland	2:02.774^{1}	+3.167	29

^{1} The #29 Racing Team Nederland started from the back of the grid after the second driver failed to set a time.

== Race ==
=== Race result ===
The minimum number of laps for classification (70% of the overall winning car's race distance) was 101 laps. Class winners are denoted in bold and with ‡.

Pos.	Class	No.	Team	Drivers	Chassis	Tyre	Laps	Time/Retired
Pos.	Class	No.	Team	Drivers	Engine	Tyre	Laps	Time/Retired
1	**LMP1**	**7**	**(Japan) Toyota Gazoo Racing**	**(United Kingdom) Mike Conway (Japan) Kamui Kobayashi (Argentina) José María López**	**Toyota TS050 Hybrid**	MI	**143**	**6:00:02.534 ‡**
1	**LMP1**	**7**	**(Japan) Toyota Gazoo Racing**	**(United Kingdom) Mike Conway (Japan) Kamui Kobayashi (Argentina) José María López**	**Toyota 2.4L Turbo V6**	MI	**143**	**6:00:02.534 ‡**
2	LMP1	8	(Japan) Toyota Gazoo Racing	(Switzerland) Sébastien Buemi (Japan) Kazuki Nakajima (New Zealand) Brendon Hartley	Toyota TS050 Hybrid	MI	143	+34.170
2	LMP1	8	(Japan) Toyota Gazoo Racing	(Switzerland) Sébastien Buemi (Japan) Kazuki Nakajima (New Zealand) Brendon Hartley	Toyota 2.4L Turbo V6	MI	143	+34.170
3	LMP1	1	(Switzerland) Rebellion Racing	(Brazil) Bruno Senna (United States) Gustavo Menezes (France) Norman Nato	Rebellion R13	MI	142	+1 Lap
3	LMP1	1	(Switzerland) Rebellion Racing	(Brazil) Bruno Senna (United States) Gustavo Menezes (France) Norman Nato	Gibson GL 4.5 L V8	MI	142	+1 Lap
4	**LMP2**	**22**	**(United Kingdom) United Autosports**	**(Portugal) Filipe Albuquerque (United Kingdom) Philip Hanson (United Kingdom) Paul di Resta**	**Oreca 07**	MI	**140**	**+3 Laps‡**
4	**LMP2**	**22**	**(United Kingdom) United Autosports**	**(Portugal) Filipe Albuquerque (United Kingdom) Philip Hanson (United Kingdom) Paul di Resta**	**Gibson GK428 4.2 L V8**	MI	**140**	**+3 Laps‡**
5	LMP2	42	(Switzerland) Cool Racing	(Switzerland) Antonin Borga (Switzerland) Alexandre Coigny (France) Nicolas Lapierre	Oreca 07	MI	139	+4 Laps
5	LMP2	42	(Switzerland) Cool Racing	(Switzerland) Antonin Borga (Switzerland) Alexandre Coigny (France) Nicolas Lapierre	Gibson GK428 4.2 L V8	MI	139	+4 Laps
6	LMP2	29	(Netherlands) Racing Team Nederland	(Netherlands) Frits van Eerd (Netherlands) Giedo van der Garde (Netherlands) Nyck de Vries	Oreca 07	MI	139	+4 Laps
6	LMP2	29	(Netherlands) Racing Team Nederland	(Netherlands) Frits van Eerd (Netherlands) Giedo van der Garde (Netherlands) Nyck de Vries	Gibson GK428 4.2 L V8	MI	139	+4 Laps
7	LMP2	38	(United Kingdom) Jota Sport	(Portugal) António Félix da Costa (United Kingdom) Anthony Davidson (Mexico) Roberto González	Oreca 07	G	139	+4 Laps
7	LMP2	38	(United Kingdom) Jota Sport	(Portugal) António Félix da Costa (United Kingdom) Anthony Davidson (Mexico) Roberto González	Gibson GK428 4.2 L V8	G	139	+4 Laps
8	LMP2	47	(Italy) Cetilar Racing	(Italy) Andrea Belicchi (Italy) Roberto Lacorte (Italy) Giorgio Sernagiotto	Dallara P217	MI	137	+6 Laps
8	LMP2	47	(Italy) Cetilar Racing	(Italy) Andrea Belicchi (Italy) Roberto Lacorte (Italy) Giorgio Sernagiotto	Gibson GK428 4.2 L V8	MI	137	+6 Laps
9	**LMGTE Pro**	**92**	**(Germany) Porsche GT Team**	**(Denmark) Michael Christensen (France) Kévin Estre**	**Porsche 911 RSR-19**	MI	**135**	**+8 Laps ‡**
9	**LMGTE Pro**	**92**	**(Germany) Porsche GT Team**	**(Denmark) Michael Christensen (France) Kévin Estre**	**Porsche 4.2 L Flat-6**	MI	**135**	**+8 Laps ‡**
10	LMGTE Pro	95	(United Kingdom) Aston Martin Racing	(Denmark) Marco Sørensen (Denmark) Nicki Thiim	Aston Martin Vantage AMR	MI	135	+8 Laps
10	LMGTE Pro	95	(United Kingdom) Aston Martin Racing	(Denmark) Marco Sørensen (Denmark) Nicki Thiim	Aston Martin 4.0 L Turbo V8	MI	135	+8 Laps
11	LMGTE Pro	97	(United Kingdom) Aston Martin Racing	(United Kingdom) Alex Lynn (Belgium) Maxime Martin	Aston Martin Vantage AMR	MI	135	+8 Laps
11	LMGTE Pro	97	(United Kingdom) Aston Martin Racing	(United Kingdom) Alex Lynn (Belgium) Maxime Martin	Aston Martin 4.0 L Turbo V8	MI	135	+8 Laps
12	LMGTE Pro	51	(Italy) AF Corse	(United Kingdom) James Calado (Italy) Alessandro Pier Guidi	Ferrari 488 GTE Evo	MI	135	+8 Laps
12	LMGTE Pro	51	(Italy) AF Corse	(United Kingdom) James Calado (Italy) Alessandro Pier Guidi	Ferrari F154CB 3.9 L Turbo V8	MI	135	+8 Laps
13	LMGTE Pro	91	(Germany) Porsche GT Team	(Italy) Gianmaria Bruni (Austria) Richard Lietz	Porsche 911 RSR-19	MI	135	+8 Laps
13	LMGTE Pro	91	(Germany) Porsche GT Team	(Italy) Gianmaria Bruni (Austria) Richard Lietz	Porsche 4.2 L Flat-6	MI	135	+8 Laps
14	LMGTE Pro	71	(Italy) AF Corse	(Spain) Miguel Molina (Italy) Davide Rigon	Ferrari 488 GTE Evo	MI	135	+8 Laps
14	LMGTE Pro	71	(Italy) AF Corse	(Spain) Miguel Molina (Italy) Davide Rigon	Ferrari F154CB 3.9 L Turbo V8	MI	135	+8 Laps
15	**LMGTE Am**	**83**	**(Italy) AF Corse**	**(France) Emmanuel Collard (Denmark) Nicklas Nielsen (France) François Perrodo**	**Ferrari 488 GTE Evo**	MI	**134**	**+9 Laps ‡**
15	**LMGTE Am**	**83**	**(Italy) AF Corse**	**(France) Emmanuel Collard (Denmark) Nicklas Nielsen (France) François Perrodo**	**Ferrari F154CB 3.9 L Turbo V8**	MI	**134**	**+9 Laps ‡**
16	LMGTE Am	77	(Germany) Dempsey-Proton Racing	(Australia) Matt Campbell (Italy) Riccardo Pera (Germany) Christian Ried	Porsche 911 RSR	MI	134	+9 Laps
16	LMGTE Am	77	(Germany) Dempsey-Proton Racing	(Australia) Matt Campbell (Italy) Riccardo Pera (Germany) Christian Ried	Porsche 4.0 L Flat-6	MI	134	+9 Laps
17	LMGTE Am	90	(United Kingdom) TF Sport	(United Kingdom) Jonathan Adam (Republic of Ireland) Charlie Eastwood (Turkey) Salih Yoluç	Aston Martin Vantage AMR	MI	134	+9 Laps
17	LMGTE Am	90	(United Kingdom) TF Sport	(United Kingdom) Jonathan Adam (Republic of Ireland) Charlie Eastwood (Turkey) Salih Yoluç	Aston Martin 4.0 L Turbo V8	MI	134	+9 Laps
18	LMGTE Am	56	(Germany) Team Project 1	(Italy) Matteo Cairoli (Germany) Laurents Hörr (Norway) Egidio Perfetti	Porsche 911 RSR	MI	133	+10 Laps
18	LMGTE Am	56	(Germany) Team Project 1	(Italy) Matteo Cairoli (Germany) Laurents Hörr (Norway) Egidio Perfetti	Porsche 4.0 L Flat-6	MI	133	+10 Laps
19	LMGTE Am	88	(Germany) Dempsey-Proton Racing	(Italy) Gianluca Giraudi (Mexico) Ricardo Sánchez (Switzerland) Lucas Légeret	Porsche 911 RSR	MI	133	+10 Laps
19	LMGTE Am	88	(Germany) Dempsey-Proton Racing	(Italy) Gianluca Giraudi (Mexico) Ricardo Sánchez (Switzerland) Lucas Légeret	Porsche 4.0 L Flat-6	MI	133	+10 Laps
20	LMGTE Am	57	(Germany) Team Project 1	(Netherlands) Jeroen Bleekemolen (Brazil) Felipe Fraga (United States) Ben Keating	Porsche 911 RSR	MI	133	+10 Laps
20	LMGTE Am	57	(Germany) Team Project 1	(Netherlands) Jeroen Bleekemolen (Brazil) Felipe Fraga (United States) Ben Keating	Porsche 4.0 L Flat-6	MI	133	+10 Laps
21	LMGTE Am	54	(Italy) AF Corse	(Italy) Francesco Castellacci (Italy) Giancarlo Fisichella (Switzerland) Thomas Flohr	Ferrari 488 GTE Evo	MI	133	+10 Laps
21	LMGTE Am	54	(Italy) AF Corse	(Italy) Francesco Castellacci (Italy) Giancarlo Fisichella (Switzerland) Thomas Flohr	Ferrari F154CB 3.9 L Turbo V8	MI	133	+10 Laps
22	LMGTE Am	62	(United Kingdom) Red River Sport	(United Kingdom) Bonamy Grimes (United Kingdom) Charles Hollings (United Kingdom) Johnny Mowlem	Ferrari 488 GTE Evo	MI	132	+11 Laps
22	LMGTE Am	62	(United Kingdom) Red River Sport	(United Kingdom) Bonamy Grimes (United Kingdom) Charles Hollings (United Kingdom) Johnny Mowlem	Ferrari F154CB 3.9 L Turbo V8	MI	132	+11 Laps
23	LMP2	37	(China) Jackie Chan DC Racing	(China) Ho-Pin Tung (Republic of Ireland) Ryan Cullen (United Kingdom) Will Stevens	Oreca 07	G	132	+11 Laps
23	LMP2	37	(China) Jackie Chan DC Racing	(China) Ho-Pin Tung (Republic of Ireland) Ryan Cullen (United Kingdom) Will Stevens	Gibson GK428 4.2 L V8	G	132	+11 Laps
24	LMP2	33	(Denmark) High Class Racing	(Denmark) Anders Fjordbach (United States) Mark Patterson (Japan) Kenta Yamashita	Oreca 07	MI	132	+11 Laps
24	LMP2	33	(Denmark) High Class Racing	(Denmark) Anders Fjordbach (United States) Mark Patterson (Japan) Kenta Yamashita	Gibson GK428 4.2 L V8	MI	132	+11 Laps
25	LMGTE Am	98	(United Kingdom) Aston Martin Racing	(Canada) Paul Dalla Lana (Brazil) Augusto Farfus (United Kingdom) Ross Gunn	Aston Martin Vantage AMR	MI	131	+12 Laps
25	LMGTE Am	98	(United Kingdom) Aston Martin Racing	(Canada) Paul Dalla Lana (Brazil) Augusto Farfus (United Kingdom) Ross Gunn	Aston Martin 4.0 L Turbo V8	MI	131	+12 Laps
26	LMGTE Am	86	(United Kingdom) Gulf Racing	(United Kingdom) Ben Barker (United Kingdom) Michael Wainwright (United Kingdom) Andrew Watson	Porsche 911 RSR	MI	130	+13 Laps
26	LMGTE Am	86	(United Kingdom) Gulf Racing	(United Kingdom) Ben Barker (United Kingdom) Michael Wainwright (United Kingdom) Andrew Watson	Porsche 4.0 L Flat-6	MI	130	+13 Laps
27	LMP1	4	(Austria) ByKolles Racing Team	(France) Tom Dillmann (Canada) Bruno Spengler (United Kingdom) Oliver Webb	ENSO CLM P1/01	MI	126	+17 Laps
27	LMP1	4	(Austria) ByKolles Racing Team	(France) Tom Dillmann (Canada) Bruno Spengler (United Kingdom) Oliver Webb	Gibson GL458 4.5L V8	MI	126	+17 Laps
28	LMP2	35	(Philippines) Eurasia Motorsport	(Australia) Nick Foster (Spain) Roberto Merhi (Japan) Nobuya Yamanaka	Ligier JS P217	MI	122	+21 Laps
28	LMP2	35	(Philippines) Eurasia Motorsport	(Australia) Nick Foster (Spain) Roberto Merhi (Japan) Nobuya Yamanaka	Gibson GK428 4.2 L V8	MI	122	+21 Laps
DNF	LMP2	36	(France) Signatech Alpine Elf	(France) Thomas Laurent (Brazil) André Negrão (France) Pierre Ragues	Alpine A470	MI	106	Crash
DNF	LMP2	36	(France) Signatech Alpine Elf	(France) Thomas Laurent (Brazil) André Negrão (France) Pierre Ragues	Gibson GK428 4.2 L V8	MI	106	Crash

== Standings after the race ==
2019–2020 LMP World Endurance Drivers Championship

Pos.	+/–	Driver	Points
1		(United Kingdom) Mike Conway (Japan) Kamui Kobayashi (Argentina) José María López	137
2		(Switzerland) Sébastien Buemi (Japan) Kazuki Nakajima (New Zealand) Brendon Hartley	125
3		(Brazil) Bruno Senna (United States) Gustavo Menezes (France) Norman Nato	109
4	1	(Portugal) Filipe Albuquerque (United Kingdom) Philip Hanson	54
5	2	(United Kingdom) Paul di Resta	46

2019-2020 LMP1 World Endurance Championship

Pos.	+/–	Team	Points
1		(Japan) Toyota Gazoo Racing	151
2		(Switzerland) Rebellion Racing	109
3		(United Kingdom) Team LNT	29

- Note: Only the top five positions are included for the Drivers Championship standings.

2019–2020 World Endurance GTE Drivers Championship

Pos.	+/–	Driver	Points
1		(Denmark) Marco Sørensen (Denmark) Nicki Thiim	127
2	1	(Denmark) Michael Christensen (France) Kévin Estre	108
3	1	(United Kingdom) James Calado (Italy) Alessandro Pier Guidi	95
4		(United Kingdom) Alex Lynn (Belgium) Maxime Martin	92
5		(Italy) Gianmaria Bruni (Austria) Richard Lietz	79

2019-2020 World Endurance GTE Manufacturers Championship

Pos.	+/–	Team	Points
1		(United Kingdom) Aston Martin	219
2		(Germany) Porsche	190
3		(Italy) Ferrari	166

- Note: Only the top five positions are included for the Drivers Championship standings.
