= GR Racing =

British racing team (founded 2021)

(United Kingdom) GR Racing
- Founded: 2011
- No.: 86
- Former names: Gulf Racing
- Base: Milton Keynes, United Kingdom
- Team principal(s): Mike Wainwright
- Current series: European Le Mans Series
- Former series: FIA World Endurance Championship
- Current drivers: (United Kingdom) Mike Wainwright (United Kingdom) Lorcan Hanafin (Netherlands) Mex Jansen
- Noted drivers: (United Kingdom) Ben Barker (Italy) Riccardo Pera (Italy) Davide Rigon (United Kingdom) Tom Fleming (racing driver)

GR Racing, formerly known as Gulf Racing, is a British auto racing team founded in 2011 by businessman and amateur driver Mike Wainwright. The team is based in Milton Keynes, England and has featured in various endurance racing events including the 24 Hours of Le Mans, European Le Mans Series (ELMS) and FIA World Endurance Championship (FIA WEC).

== History ==
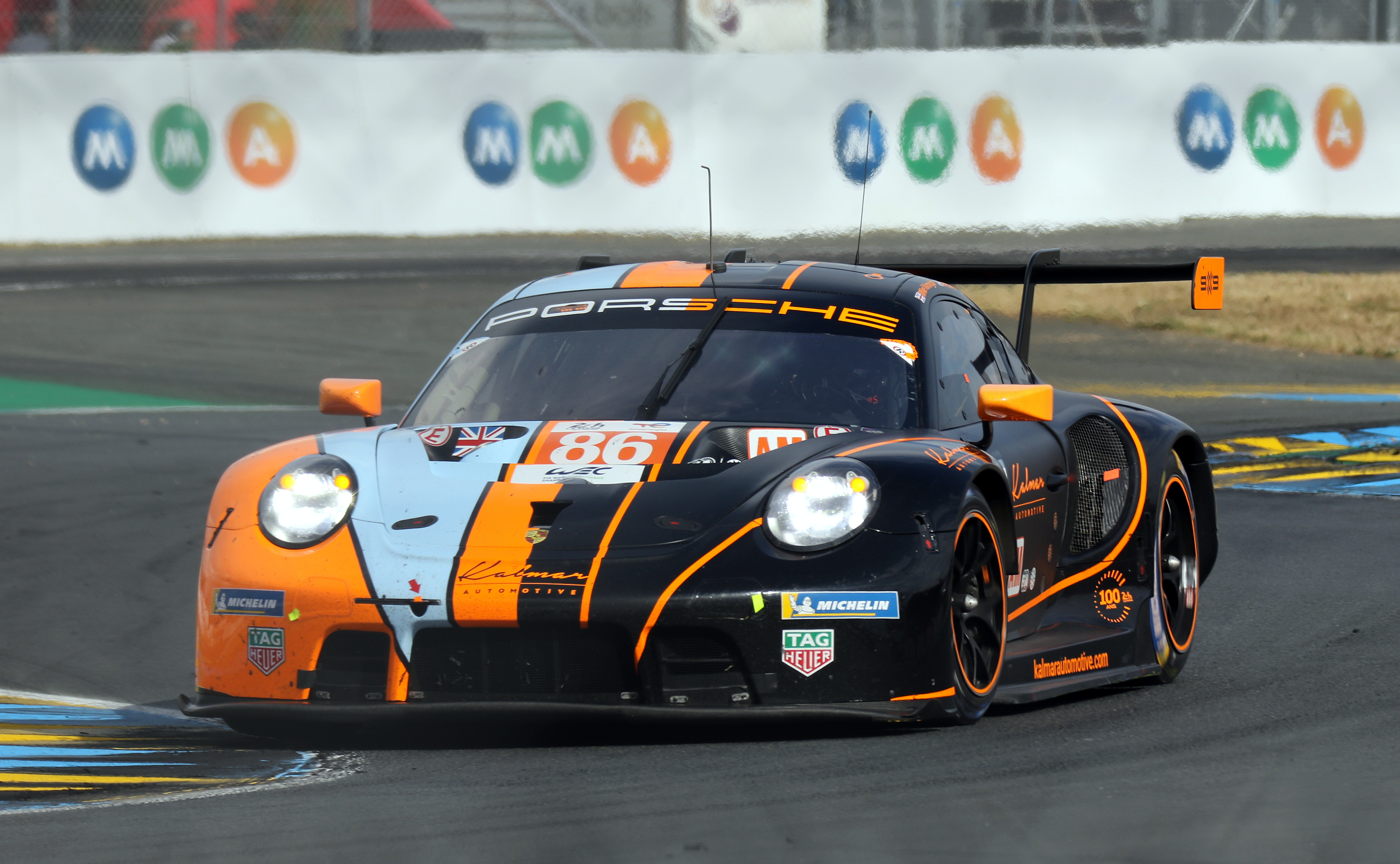
GR Racing's Porsche 911 RSR-19 at the 2023 24 Hours of Le Mans

GR Racing was founded in 2011 with the aim to merge competitive racing with the iconic Gulf Oil livery, representing motorsports excellence since the 1960s. The team debuted in the 2016 FIA World Endurance Championship competing in the GTE Am category with a Porsche 911 RSR.

The debut season provided valuable experience and a competitive edge. Over subsequent years, Gulf Racing achieved podium finishes in the FIA WEC, led by Ben Barker. In 2021 the team stopped using the Gulf Oil livery and changed its name to GR Racing.

In recent years, GR Racing has been active in the FIA WEC and other endurance racing series. At the 24 Hours of Le Mans the team finished 4th in the LM GTE Am class in 2022 and 3rd in 2023. The team expanded its operations and technical capabilities, forming partnerships with leading automotive and racing technology companies.

In 2024, GR Racing became a Ferrari customer team, fielding a Ferrari 296 GT3 in the European Le Mans Series for Wainwright, Riccardo Pera and factory driver Davide Rigon.

For 2025 the team continued with Ferrari in the European Le Mans series. Drivers Wainwright and Pera were joined by Tom Fleming and scored podiums in Le Castellet and Silverstone. The team was leading the race in Silverstone when a red-flag due to weather brought the race to a halt und the following count-back resulted in the team being pushed back to P2 as the overtake for P1 had only happened shortly before the red flag was called. GR Racing finished the season in P8.

The 2026 European Le Mans Series kicked off with a new lineup for GR. Mike Wainwright was joined by Mex Jansen and Lorcan Hanafin. The team scored a podium in Round 2 of the European Le Mans Series in Le Castellet.

== Racing record ==
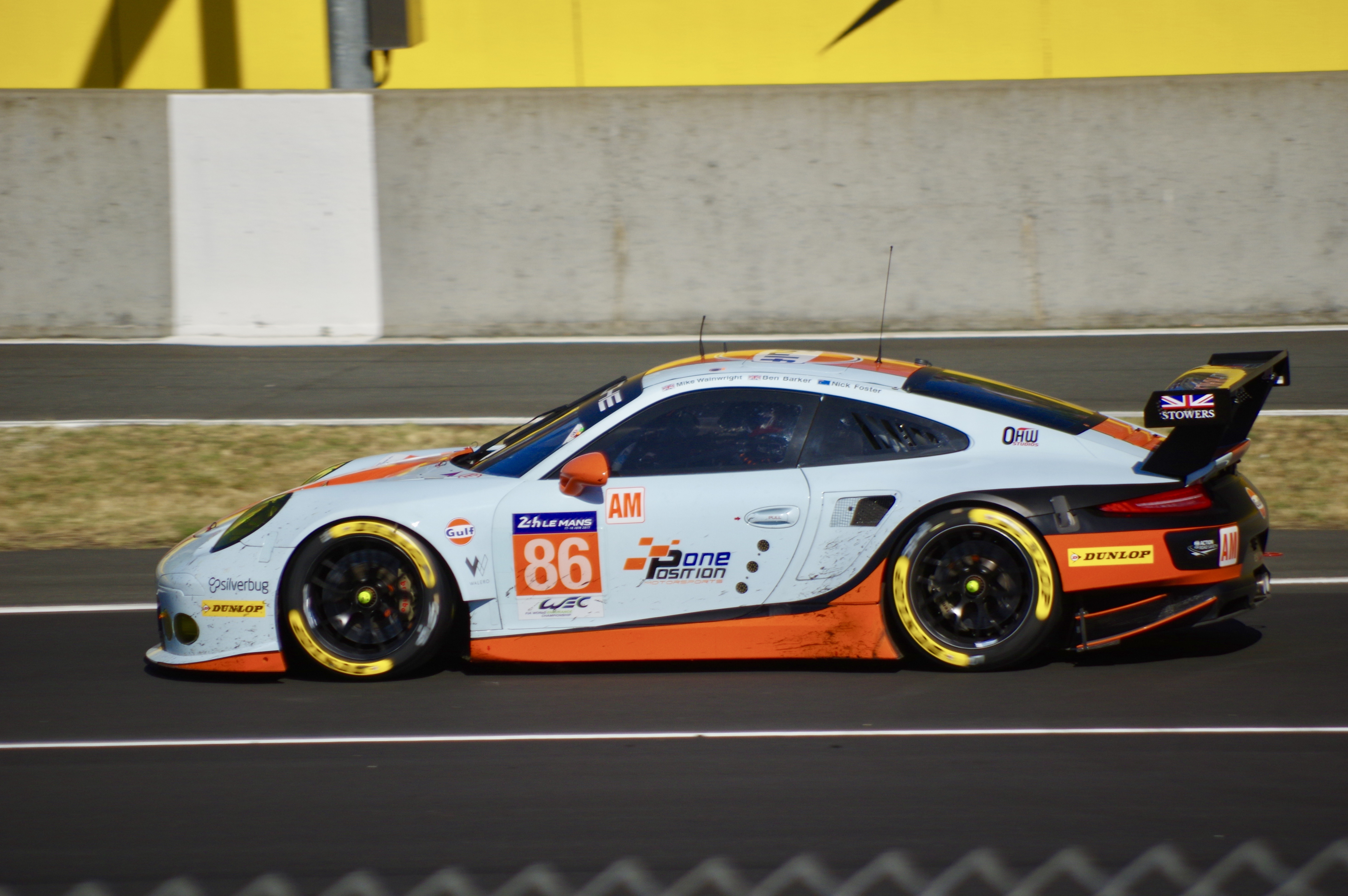
Gulf Racing UK's Porsche 911 RSR at the 2017 24 Hours of Le Mans

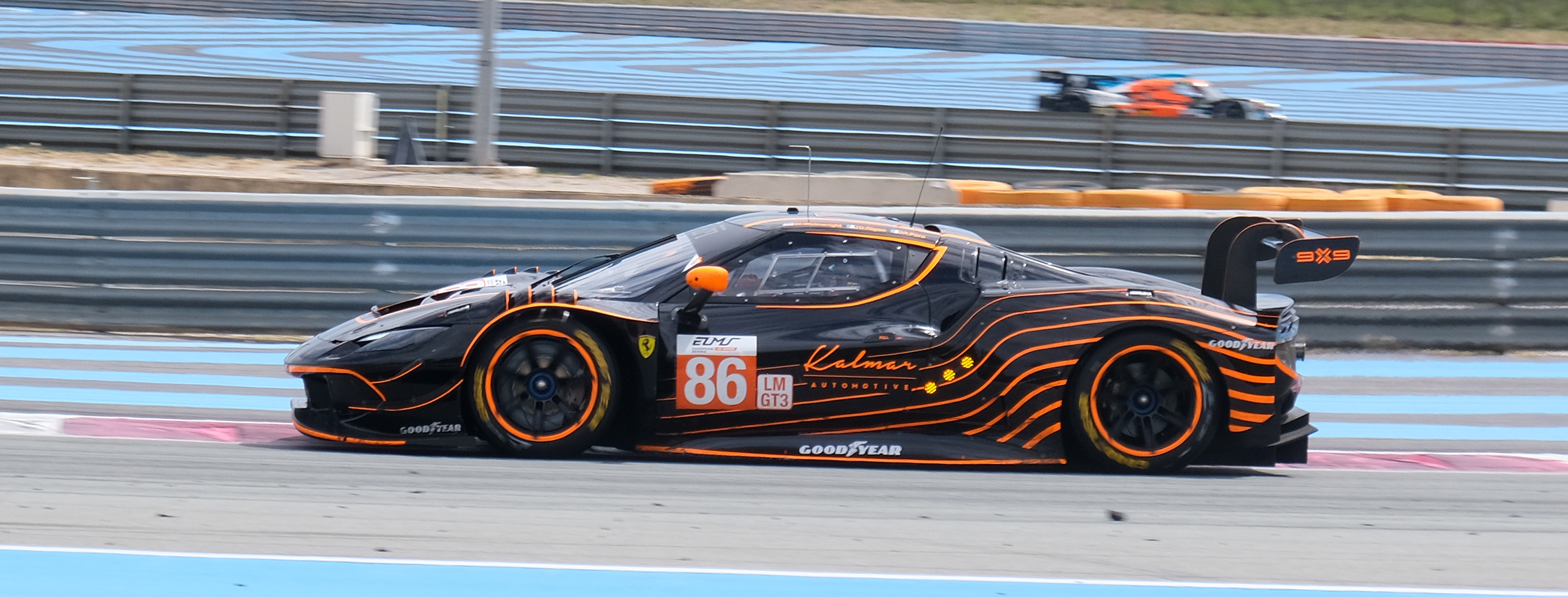
GR Racing's Ferrari 296 GT3 running at Circuit Paul Ricard in ELMS in 2024

=== 24 Hours of Le Mans results ===
Year	Entrant	No.	Car	Drivers	Class	Laps	Pos.	Class Pos.
2016	(United Kingdom) Gulf Racing	86	Porsche 911 RSR	(United Kingdom) Ben Barker (United Kingdom) Adam Carroll (United Kingdom) Mike Wainwright	LMGTE Am	328	33rd	5th
2017	(United Kingdom) Gulf Racing UK	86	Porsche 911 RSR	(United Kingdom) Ben Barker (Australia) Nick Foster (United Kingdom) Mike Wainwright	LMGTE Am	328	38th	10th
2018	(United Kingdom) Gulf Racing	86	Porsche 911 RSR	(United Kingdom) Ben Barker (Australia) Alex Davison (United Kingdom) Mike Wainwright	LMGTE Am	283	40th	10th
2019	(United Kingdom) Gulf Racing	86	Porsche 911 RSR	(United Kingdom) Ben Barker (Austria) Thomas Preining (United Kingdom) Mike Wainwright	LMGTE Am	331	38th	8th
2020	(United Kingdom) Gulf Racing	86	Porsche 911 RSR	(United Kingdom) Ben Barker (United Kingdom) Mike Wainwright (United Kingdom) Andrew Watson	LMGTE Am	337	29th	5th
2021	(United Kingdom) GR Racing	86	Porsche 911 RSR-19	(United Kingdom) Ben Barker (United Kingdom) Tom Gamble (United Kingdom) Mike Wainwright	LMGTE Am	322	43rd	14th
2022	(United Kingdom) GR Racing	86	Porsche 911 RSR-19	(United Kingdom) Ben Barker (Italy) Riccardo Pera (United Kingdom) Mike Wainwright	LMGTE Am	340	37th	4th
2023	(United Kingdom) GR Racing	86	Porsche 911 RSR-19	(United Kingdom) Ben Barker (Italy) Riccardo Pera (United Kingdom) Mike Wainwright	LMGTE Am	312	29th	3rd
2024	(United Kingdom) GR Racing	86	Ferrari 296 GT3	(Italy) Riccardo Pera (Brazil) Daniel Serra (United Kingdom) Mike Wainwright	LMGT3	278	39th	12th
