= 2019 1000 Miles of Sebring =

Sports car endurance race held in Sebring, Florida, USA

Track map of the Sebring International Raceway

The 2019 1,000 Miles of Sebring was an Endurance sportscar racing event held on 15 March 2019, as the sixth round of the 2018-19 FIA World Endurance Championship. This was the inaugural running of the race, a 268-lap event, and the first FIA WEC race to be held at Sebring International Raceway since the 2012 12 Hours of Sebring.

== Background ==
The provisional calendar for the 2018-19 FIA World Endurance Championship, released on 1 September 2017 saw a raft of changes, with several races dropped, but included a return to Sebring for the first time since 2012. In the provisional calendar issued, the race was originally planned to be run as a second 12-hour race after the IMSA Mobil 1 12 Hours of Sebring on the same weekend, and would start at midnight after the conclusion of the IMSA 12 hours. On 21 September 2017, the race became known as the 1500 Miles of Sebring, to avoid confusion between the 2 events, at the FIA World Motor Sport Council meeting in Paris. However, on 4 April 2018, it was announced that the race would become shortened to 1000 Miles or 268 laps, have a time limit of 8 Hours, and would take place on March 15 instead, prior to the start of the 12 Hours of Sebring, rather than after the race. In addition, it was also announced that there would be a new pitlane built to accommodate the WEC teams, located on the Ulman Straight.

== Entry list ==
The entry list released on 8 February 2019 saw a number of changes, with the #4 ByKolles Racing Team ENSO CLM P1/01 removed, after the team announced they would not compete due to an engine supply dispute with NISMO, and an additional Entry from the Corvette Racing team. Nathanael Berthon was added to the #3 Rebellion Racing Rebellion R13, while Mathias Beche moved to the #1, replacing Andre Lotterer, who was unable to attend due to a clashing simulator test for the DS Techeetah Formula E team. Jenson Button and Matevos Isaakyan were replaced in the #11 and #17 SMP Racing BR Engineering BR1s by Brendon Hartley and Sergey Sirotkin respectively.

== Qualifying ==
=== Qualifying Results ===
Pole position winners in each class are marked in bold

Pos	Class	Team	Average Time	Gap	Grid
1	**LMP1**	**No. 8 Toyota Gazoo Racing**	**1:40.318**	-	**1**
2	LMP1	No. 7 Toyota Gazoo Racing	1:40.803	+0.485	2
3	LMP1	No. 3 Rebellion Racing	1:42.863	+2.545	3
4	LMP1	No. 17 SMP Racing	1:42.942^{1}	+2.624	4
5	LMP1	No. 11 SMP Racing	1:43.005	+2.687	5
6	LMP1	No. 1 Rebellion Racing	1:43.015	+2.697	6
7	LMP1	No. 10 DragonSpeed	1:44.288	+3.970	7
8	**LMP2**	**No. 38 Jackie Chan DC Racing**	**1:47.558**	**+7.240**	**8**
9	LMP2	No. 37 Jackie Chan DC Racing	1:48.208	+7.890	9
10	LMP2	No. 36 Signatech Alpine Matmut	1:48.524	+8.206	10
11	LMP2	No. 31 DragonSpeed	1:49.681	+9.363	11
12	LMP2	No. 50 Larbre Compétition	1:50.705	+10.387	12
13	LMP2	No. 28 TDS Racing	1:51.218	+10.900	13
14	**LMGTE Pro**	**No. 92 Porsche GT Team**	**1:57.500**	**+17.182**	14
15	LMGTE Pro	No. 67 Ford Chip Ganassi Team UK	1:57.615	+17.297	15
16	LMGTE Pro	No. 66 Ford Chip Ganassi Team UK	1:57.714	+17.396	16
17	LMGTE Pro	No. 82 BMW Team MTEK	1:57.841	+17.523	17
18	LMGTE Pro	No. 63 Corvette Racing	1:57.844	+17.526	18
19	LMGTE Pro	No. 71 AF Corse	1:57.938	+17.620	19
20	LMGTE Pro	No. 81 BMW Team MTEK	1:58.000	+17.682	20
21	LMGTE Pro	No. 91 Porsche GT Team	1:58.113	+17.795	21
22	LMGTE Pro	No. 51 AF Corse	1:58.232	+17.914	22
23	LMGTE Pro	No. 95 Aston Martin Racing	1:58.366	+18.048	23
24	**LMGTE Am**	**No. 77 Dempsey-Proton Racing**	**1:59.790**	**+19.472**	**24**
25	LMGTE Am	No. 56 Team Project 1	1:59.935	+19.617	25
28	LMGTE Am	No. 98 Aston Martin Racing	2:00.076	+19.758	26
27	LMGTE Am	No. 88 Dempsey-Proton Racing	2:00.417	+20.099	27
28	LMGTE Am	No. 90 TF Sport	2:00.543	+20.225	28
29	LMGTE Am	No. 54 Spirit of Race	2:00.759^{2}	+20.441	29
30	LMGTE Am	No. 70 MR Racing	2:01.679^{2}	+21.361	30
31	LMGTE Pro	No. 97 Aston Martin Racing	2:04.748	+24.430	31
32	LMGTE Am	No. 61 Clearwater Racing	1:59.396^{3}	+19.078	WD^{4}
33	LMGTE Am	No. 86 Gulf Racing UK	1:59.436^{5}	+19.118	32
34	LMP2	No. 29 Racing Team Nederland	No Time^{6}	—	33

^1 – Stephane Sarrazin had his best lap time deleted for ignoring blue flags.
^2 – Thomas Flohr and Motoaki Ishakawa both had their fastest lap times deleted for speeding under the red flag.
^3 – Only one driver of the No. 61 Clearwater Racing set a lap time.
^4 – The No. 61 Clearwater Racing withdrew due to Perez-Companc's crash in qualifying.
^5 – Michael Wainwright had his fastest lap time deleted for speeding under the red flag, resulting in only one driver of the No. 86 Gulf Racing UK being classified as setting a lap time.
^6 – All of Frits van Eerd's and Nyck de Vries' lap times were deleted for speeding in the pit lane, resulting in the No. 29 Racing Team Nederland having no times.

== Race ==
=== Race result ===
The minimum number of laps for classification (70% of the overall winning car's distance was 178 laps. Class winners are in bold.

Pos	Class	No	Team	Drivers	Chassis	Tyre	Laps	Time/Retired
Pos	Class	No	Team	Drivers	Engine	Tyre	Laps	Time/Retired
1	**LMP1**	**8**	**(Japan) Toyota Gazoo Racing**	**(Spain) Fernando Alonso (Switzerland) Sébastien Buemi (Japan) Kazuki Nakajima**	**Toyota TS050 Hybrid**	MI	**253**	**8:00:38.186**
1	**LMP1**	**8**	**(Japan) Toyota Gazoo Racing**	**(Spain) Fernando Alonso (Switzerland) Sébastien Buemi (Japan) Kazuki Nakajima**	**Toyota 2.4L Turbo V6**	MI	**253**	**8:00:38.186**
2	LMP1	7	(Japan) Toyota Gazoo Racing	(United Kingdom) Mike Conway (Japan) Kamui Kobayashi (Argentina) José María López	Toyota TS050 Hybrid	MI	252	+1 Lap
2	LMP1	7	(Japan) Toyota Gazoo Racing	(United Kingdom) Mike Conway (Japan) Kamui Kobayashi (Argentina) José María López	Toyota 2.4L Turbo V6	MI	252	+1 Lap
3	LMP1	11	(Russia) SMP Racing	(Russia) Mikhail Aleshin (New Zealand) Brendon Hartley (Russia) Vitaly Petrov	BR Engineering BR1	MI	242	+11 Laps
3	LMP1	11	(Russia) SMP Racing	(Russia) Mikhail Aleshin (New Zealand) Brendon Hartley (Russia) Vitaly Petrov	AER P60B 2.4L Turbo V6	MI	242	+11 Laps
4	**LMP2**	**37**	**(China) Jackie Chan DC Racing**	**(Denmark) David Heinemeier Hansson (United Kingdom) Jordan King (United Kingdom) Will Stevens**	**Oreca 07**	D	**239**	**+14 laps**
4	**LMP2**	**37**	**(China) Jackie Chan DC Racing**	**(Denmark) David Heinemeier Hansson (United Kingdom) Jordan King (United Kingdom) Will Stevens**	**Gibson GK428 4.2L V8**	D	**239**	**+14 laps**
5	LMP2	36	(France) Singatech Alpine Matmut	(France) Nicolas Lapierre (Brazil) André Negrão (France) Pierre Thiriet	Alpine A470	MI	239	+14 laps
5	LMP2	36	(France) Singatech Alpine Matmut	(France) Nicolas Lapierre (Brazil) André Negrão (France) Pierre Thiriet	Gibson GK428 4.2L V8	MI	239	+14 laps
6	LMP2	31	(United States) DragonSpeed	(United Kingdom) Anthony Davidson (Mexico) Roberto Gonzalez (Venezuela) Pastor Maldonado	Oreca 07	MI	237	+16 laps
6	LMP2	31	(United States) DragonSpeed	(United Kingdom) Anthony Davidson (Mexico) Roberto Gonzalez (Venezuela) Pastor Maldonado	Gibson GK428 4.2L V8	MI	237	+16 laps
7	LMP1	3	(Switzerland) Rebellion Racing	(France) Nathanaël Berthon (France) Thomas Laurent (United States) Gustavo Menezes	Rebellion R13	MI	237	+16 laps
7	LMP1	3	(Switzerland) Rebellion Racing	(France) Nathanaël Berthon (France) Thomas Laurent (United States) Gustavo Menezes	Gibson GL458 4.5L V8	MI	237	+16 laps
8	LMP2	50	(France) Larbre Compétition	(France) Erwin Creed (United States) Gunnar Jeannette (France) Romano Ricci	Ligier JS P217	MI	234	+19 laps
8	LMP2	50	(France) Larbre Compétition	(France) Erwin Creed (United States) Gunnar Jeannette (France) Romano Ricci	Gibson GK428 4.2L V8	MI	234	+19 laps
9	LMP2	29	(Netherlands) Racing Team Nederland	(Netherlands) Frits van Eerd (Netherlands) Giedo van der Garde (Netherlands) Nyck de Vries	Dallara P217	MI	230	+23 laps
9	LMP2	29	(Netherlands) Racing Team Nederland	(Netherlands) Frits van Eerd (Netherlands) Giedo van der Garde (Netherlands) Nyck de Vries	Gibson GK428 4.2L V8	MI	230	+23 laps
10	**LMGTE; Pro**	**91**	**(Germany) Porsche GT Team**	**(Italy) Gianmaria Bruni (Austria) Richard Lietz**	**Porsche 911 RSR**	MI	**226**	**+27 laps**
10	**LMGTE; Pro**	**91**	**(Germany) Porsche GT Team**	**(Italy) Gianmaria Bruni (Austria) Richard Lietz**	**Porsche 4.0L Flat 6**	MI	**226**	**+27 laps**
11	LMGTE; Pro	81	(Germany) BMW Team MTEK	(Netherlands) Nicky Catsburg (United Kingdom) Alexander Sims (Germany) Martin Tomczyk	BMW M8 GTE	MI	226	+27 laps
11	LMGTE; Pro	81	(Germany) BMW Team MTEK	(Netherlands) Nicky Catsburg (United Kingdom) Alexander Sims (Germany) Martin Tomczyk	BMW S63 4.0L Turbo V8	MI	226	+27 laps
12	LMGTE; Pro	67	(United States) Ford Chip Ganassi Team UK	(United States) Jonathan Bomarito (United Kingdom) Andy Priaulx (United Kingdom) Harry Tincknell	Ford GT	MI	225	+28 laps
12	LMGTE; Pro	67	(United States) Ford Chip Ganassi Team UK	(United States) Jonathan Bomarito (United Kingdom) Andy Priaulx (United Kingdom) Harry Tincknell	Ford EcoBoost 3.5L Turbo V6	MI	225	+28 laps
13	LMGTE; Pro	51	(Italy) AF Corse	(United Kingdom) James Calado (Italy) Alessandro Pier Guidi (Brazil) Daniel Serra	Ferrari 488 GTE Evo	MI	225	+28 laps
13	LMGTE; Pro	51	(Italy) AF Corse	(United Kingdom) James Calado (Italy) Alessandro Pier Guidi (Brazil) Daniel Serra	Ferrari F154CB 3.9L Turbo V8	MI	225	+28 laps
14	LMGTE; Pro	92	(Germany) Porsche GT Team	(Denmark) Michael Christensen (France) Kévin Estre	Porsche 911 RSR	MI	225	+28 laps
14	LMGTE; Pro	92	(Germany) Porsche GT Team	(Denmark) Michael Christensen (France) Kévin Estre	Porsche 4.0L Flat 6	MI	225	+28 laps
15	LMGTE; Pro	71	(Italy) AF Corse	(United Kingdom) Sam Bird (Spain) Miguel Molina (Italy) Davide Rigon	Ferrari 488 GTE Evo	MI	225	+28 laps
15	LMGTE; Pro	71	(Italy) AF Corse	(United Kingdom) Sam Bird (Spain) Miguel Molina (Italy) Davide Rigon	Ferrari F154CB 3.9L Turbo V8	MI	225	+28 laps
16	LMGTE; Pro	82	(Germany) BMW Team MTEK	(Portugal) António Félix da Costa (Brazil) Augusto Farfus (Canada) Bruno Spengler	BMW M8 GTE	MI	225	+28 laps
16	LMGTE; Pro	82	(Germany) BMW Team MTEK	(Portugal) António Félix da Costa (Brazil) Augusto Farfus (Canada) Bruno Spengler	BMW S63 4.0L Turbo V8	MI	225	+28 laps
17	LMGTE; Pro	63	(United States) Corvette Racing	(Spain) Antonio Garcia (Denmark) Jan Magnussen (Germany) Mike Rockenfeller	Chevrolet Corvette C7.R	MI	225	+28 laps
17	LMGTE; Pro	63	(United States) Corvette Racing	(Spain) Antonio Garcia (Denmark) Jan Magnussen (Germany) Mike Rockenfeller	Chevrolet 5.5L V8	MI	225	+28 laps
18	LMGTE; Pro	97	(United Kingdom) Aston Martin Racing	(United Kingdom) Alex Lynn (Belgium) Maxime Martin	Aston Martin Vantage AMR	MI	224	+29 laps
18	LMGTE; Pro	97	(United Kingdom) Aston Martin Racing	(United Kingdom) Alex Lynn (Belgium) Maxime Martin	Aston Martin 4.0L Turbo V8	MI	224	+29 laps
19	LMGTE; Pro	95	(United Kingdom) Aston Martin Racing	(Denmark) Marco Sørensen (Denmark) Nicki Thiim (United Kingdom) Darren Turner	Aston Martin Vantage AMR	MI	224	+29 laps
19	LMGTE; Pro	95	(United Kingdom) Aston Martin Racing	(Denmark) Marco Sørensen (Denmark) Nicki Thiim (United Kingdom) Darren Turner	Aston Martin 4.0L Turbo V8	MI	224	+29 laps
20	**LMGTE; Am**	**77**	**(Germany) Dempsey – Proton Racing**	**(France) Julien Andlauer (Australia) Matt Campbell (Germany) Christian Ried**	**Porsche 911 RSR**	MI	**221**	**+32 laps**
20	**LMGTE; Am**	**77**	**(Germany) Dempsey – Proton Racing**	**(France) Julien Andlauer (Australia) Matt Campbell (Germany) Christian Ried**	**Porsche 4.0L Flat 6**	MI	**221**	**+32 laps**
21	LMGTE; Am	54	(Switzerland) Spirit of Race	(Italy) Francesco Castellacci (Italy) Giancarlo Fisichella (Switzerland) Thomas Flohr	Ferrari 488 GTE Evo	MI	221	+32 laps
21	LMGTE; Am	54	(Switzerland) Spirit of Race	(Italy) Francesco Castellacci (Italy) Giancarlo Fisichella (Switzerland) Thomas Flohr	Ferrari F154CB 3.9L Turbo V8	MI	221	+32 laps
22	LMGTE; Am	56	(Germany) Team Project 1	(Germany) Jörg Bergmeister (United States) Patrick Lindsey (Norway) Egidio Perfetti	Porsche 911 RSR	MI	221	+32 laps
22	LMGTE; Am	56	(Germany) Team Project 1	(Germany) Jörg Bergmeister (United States) Patrick Lindsey (Norway) Egidio Perfetti	Porsche 4.0L Flat 6	MI	221	+32 laps
23	LMGTE; Am	86	(United Kingdom) Gulf Racing UK	(United Kingdom) Ben Barker (Austria) Thomas Preining (United Kingdom) Michael Wainwright	Porsche 911 RSR	MI	221	+32 laps
23	LMGTE; Am	86	(United Kingdom) Gulf Racing UK	(United Kingdom) Ben Barker (Austria) Thomas Preining (United Kingdom) Michael Wainwright	Porsche 4.0L Flat 6	MI	221	+32 laps
24	LMGTE; Am	70	(Japan) MR Racing	(Monaco) Olivier Beretta (Italy) Eddie Cheever III (Japan) Motoaki Ishikawa	Ferrari 488 GTE Evo	MI	220	+33 laps
24	LMGTE; Am	70	(Japan) MR Racing	(Monaco) Olivier Beretta (Italy) Eddie Cheever III (Japan) Motoaki Ishikawa	Ferrari F154CB 3.9L Turbo V8	MI	220	+33 laps
25	LMGTE; Am	90	(United Kingdom) TF Sport	(United Kingdom) Jonathan Adam (Republic of Ireland) Charlie Eastwood (Turkey) Salih Yoluç	Aston Martin Vantage GTE	MI	220	+33 laps
25	LMGTE; Am	90	(United Kingdom) TF Sport	(United Kingdom) Jonathan Adam (Republic of Ireland) Charlie Eastwood (Turkey) Salih Yoluç	Aston Martin 4.5L V8	MI	220	+33 laps
26	LMGTE; Am	88	(Germany) Dempsey – Proton Racing	(Italy) Matteo Cairoli (Italy) Gianluca Roda (Italy) Giorgio Roda	Porsche 911 RSR	MI	219	+34 laps
26	LMGTE; Am	88	(Germany) Dempsey – Proton Racing	(Italy) Matteo Cairoli (Italy) Gianluca Roda (Italy) Giorgio Roda	Porsche 4.0L Flat 6	MI	219	+34 laps
27	LMGTE; Am	98	(United Kingdom) Aston Martin Racing	(Canada) Paul Dalla Lana (Portugal) Pedro Lamy (Austria) Mathias Lauda	Aston Martin Vantage GTE	MI	219	+34 laps
27	LMGTE; Am	98	(United Kingdom) Aston Martin Racing	(Canada) Paul Dalla Lana (Portugal) Pedro Lamy (Austria) Mathias Lauda	Aston Martin 4.5L V8	MI	219	+34 laps
28	LMGTE; Pro	66	(United States) Ford Chip Ganassi Team UK	(United States) Billy Johnson (Germany) Stefan Mücke (France) Olivier Pla	Ford GT	MI	216	+37 laps
28	LMGTE; Pro	66	(United States) Ford Chip Ganassi Team UK	(United States) Billy Johnson (Germany) Stefan Mücke (France) Olivier Pla	Ford EcoBoost 3.5L Turbo V6	MI	216	+37 laps
29	LMP2	38	(China) Jackie Chan DC Racing	(France) Gabriel Aubry (Monaco) Stéphane Richelmi (China) Ho-Pin Tung	Oreca 07	D	209	+44 laps
29	LMP2	38	(China) Jackie Chan DC Racing	(France) Gabriel Aubry (Monaco) Stéphane Richelmi (China) Ho-Pin Tung	Gibson GK428 4.2L V8	D	209	+44 laps
NC (Note: The TDS Racing No. 28 and the SMP Racing No. 17 did not complete the final lap of the race and therefore, were not classified as finishers.)	LMP2	28	(France) TDS Racing	(France) Loïc Duval (France) François Perrodo (France) Matthieu Vaxivière	Oreca 07	D	232	Not Classified
NC	LMP2	28	(France) TDS Racing	(France) Loïc Duval (France) François Perrodo (France) Matthieu Vaxivière	Gibson GK428 4.2L V8	D	232	Not Classified
NC	LMP1	17	(Russia) SMP Racing	(Russia) Egor Orudzhev (France) Stéphane Sarrazin (Russia) Sergey Sirotkin	BR Engineering BR1	MI	62	Not Classified
NC	LMP1	17	(Russia) SMP Racing	(Russia) Egor Orudzhev (France) Stéphane Sarrazin (Russia) Sergey Sirotkin	AER P60B 2.4L Turbo V6	MI	62	Not Classified
DNF	LMP1	10	(United States) DragonSpeed	(United Kingdom) Ben Hanley (Sweden) Henrik Hedman (Netherlands) Renger van der Zande	BR Engineering BR1	MI	143	Electronics
DNF	LMP1	10	(United States) DragonSpeed	(United Kingdom) Ben Hanley (Sweden) Henrik Hedman (Netherlands) Renger van der Zande	Gibson GL458 4.5L V8	MI	143	Electronics
DNF	LMP1	1	(Switzerland) Rebellion Racing	(Switzerland) Mathias Beche (Switzerland) Neel Jani (Brazil) Bruno Senna	Rebellion R13	MI	138	Electronics
DNF	LMP1	1	(Switzerland) Rebellion Racing	(Switzerland) Mathias Beche (Switzerland) Neel Jani (Brazil) Bruno Senna	Gibson GL458 4.5L V8	MI	138	Electronics
DNS	LMGTE; Am	61	(Singapore) Clearwater Racing	(Italy) Matteo Cressoni (Republic of Ireland) Matt Griffin (Argentina) Luís Pérez Companc	Ferrari 488 GTE Evo	MI	—	Did Not Start
DNS	LMGTE; Am	61	(Singapore) Clearwater Racing	(Italy) Matteo Cressoni (Republic of Ireland) Matt Griffin (Argentina) Luís Pérez Companc	Ferrari F154CB 3.9L Turbo V8	MI	—	Did Not Start

== Standings after the race ==
2018–2019 LMP World Endurance Drivers' Championship

Pos.	+/–	Driver	Points
1		(Spain) Fernando Alonso (Japan) Kazuki Nakajima (Switzerland) Sébastien Buemi	135
2		(Japan) Kamui Kobayashi (United Kingdom) Mike Conway (Argentina) José María López	120
3		(France) Thomas Laurent (United States) Gustavo Menezes	81
4	1	(Switzerland) Mathias Beche	73
5	1	(Switzerland) Neel Jani (Germany) André Lotterer	63

2018–2019 LMP1 World Endurance Championship

Pos.	+/–	Team	Points
1		(Japan) Toyota Gazoo Racing	151
2		(Switzerland) Rebellion Racing	98
3		(Russia) SMP Racing	71
4		(Austria) ByKolles Racing Team	22
5		(United States) DragonSpeed	8.5
6		(China) CEFC TRSM Racing	1

- Note: Only the top five positions are included for the Drivers' Championship standings.

2018–2019 World Endurance GTE Drivers' Championship

Pos.	+/–	Driver	Points
1		(Denmark) Michael Christensen (France) Kévin Estre	125
2	1	(Italy) Gianmaria Bruni (Austria) Richard Lietz	100
3	1	(United Kingdom) James Calado (Italy) Alessandro Pier Guidi	80.5
4	2	(Germany) Stefan Mücke (France) Olivier Pla	69
5		(Denmark) Marco Sørensen (Denmark) Nicki Thiim	58.5

2018–2019 World Endurance GTE Manufacturers' Championship

Pos.	+/–	Constructor	Points
1		(Germany) Porsche	227
2	1	(Italy) Ferrari	127
3	1	(United States) Ford	125
4		(United Kingdom) Aston Martin	102
5		(Germany) BMW	87

- Note: Only the top five positions are included for the Drivers' Championship standings.

FIA World Endurance Championship
Previous race: 6 Hours of Shanghai	2018–19 season	Next race: 6 Hours of Spa-Francorchamps
