= Stefan Mücke =

German racing driver (born 1981)

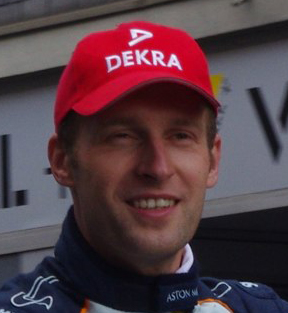
- Mücke at the 2011 24 Hours of Le Mans driver parade
- Nationality: (Germany) German
- Born: 22 November 1981 (age 44) West Berlin, West Germany
- Categorisation: FIA Platinum (until 2025); FIA Gold (2026–)
24 Hours of Le Mans career
- Years: 2007–2019
- Teams: Charouz Racing Systems, Aston Martin Racing, Ford Chip Ganassi Racing
- Best finish: 4th (2009)

Stefan Mücke (born 22 November 1981) is a German racing driver.

== Racing career ==
Born in Berlin, Mücke started his racing career in 1998, when he won the Formula BMW ADAC series, with his father's Mücke Motorsport team, also making their debut. He competed in German Formula Three for his father's team for the next three years, before moving to the Deutsche Tourenwagen Masters for 2002. He raced Mercedes for Team Rosberg, Persson Motorsport and Mücke Motorsport in his four years in the series.

In 2007, Mücke moved into sports car racing, in the FIA GT Championship for the AllInkl.com team in a Lamborghini Murciélago R-GT, and in the Le Mans Series and the 24 Hours of Le Mans for Charouz Racing Systems in their Lola. He continued to race with Charouz in 2008. In 2009, he competed at the Le Mans Series for Aston Martin Racing. He recorded three consecutive top-ten finishes in the LMP1 class at Le Mans.

On 5 June 2011, Mücke was involved in incident with Richard Westbrook during FIA GT1 World Championship race at Silverstone. First, Westbrook hit Mücke who spun as a result, while Westbrook damaged his own car. Mücke continued and clipped ahead of Westbrook who was driving down Hangar Straight. Both cars were wrecked as a result, and were out of the race. Mücke received ten-place grid penalty for the next race and he was also reported to DMSB to have his licence withdrawn.

Mücke again had his aggressive driving style questioned after at least two incidents in the 2015 Liqui-Moly Bathurst 12 Hour. Both involved collisions with Bentleys on the difficult Mount Panorama Circuit. The first took out David Brabham at 'The Cutting', the second on the last corner of the last lap forced Matt Bell wide, depriving the latter of a podium place. "I think the guy (Mücke) needs a bit of a talking to," said Bell's co-driver Guy Smith.

For 2012, Mücke competed in the FIA World Endurance Championship with Aston Martin Racing in a GTE-Pro class Aston Martin Vantage.

In the 80th, edition of the 24 Hours of Le Mans in 2012, Mücke and the Aston Martin Racing got the third place in the GTE-Pro class along with his co-drivers the Mexican Adrián Fernández and the British Darren Turner, their Aston Martin Vantage 4.5 L-V8 covered a total of 332 laps (2,811.65 miles), in the Circuit de la Sarthe without failure or serious mechanical problems. Also the team achieved the fastest lap of the category with 3 minutes and 54.928 seconds.

In 2016, Mücke joined Ford Chip Ganassi Racing UK's two-car FIA World Endurance Championship LMGTE Pro effort after eight seasons with Aston Martin.

== Racing record ==
=== Complete Deutsche Tourenwagen Masters results ===
(key) (Races in bold indicate pole position) (Races in italics indicate fastest lap)

Year	Team	Car	1	2	3	4	5	6	7	8	9	10	11	12	13	14	15	16	17	18	19	20	Pos.	Pts
2002	Team Rosberg	AMG-Mercedes CLK-DTM 2001	HOC; QR; 12	HOC; CR; Ret	ZOL; QR; 15	ZOL; CR; 11	DON; QR; 15	DON; CR; 13	SAC; QR; 17	SAC; CR; Ret	NOR; QR; 9	NOR; CR; Ret	LAU; QR; 18	LAU; CR; 16	NÜR; QR; 12	NÜR; CR; 17	A1R; QR; 20	A1R; CR; 14	ZAN; QR; 19	ZAN; CR; 15	HOC; QR; 10	HOC; CR; 8	20th	0
2003	Team Rosberg	AMG-Mercedes CLK-DTM 2002	HOC; 17	ADR; Ret	NÜR; 15	LAU; DNS	NOR; 15	DON; 11	NÜR; 12	A1R; 11	ZAN; 17	HOC; 14											20th	0
2004	Persson Motorsport	AMG-Mercedes CLK-DTM 2003	HOC; 18†	EST; 14	ADR; 7	LAU; Ret	NOR; 15†	SHA^{1} 10	NÜR; 10	OSC; 17	ZAN; 17	BRN; 11	HOC; 10										15th	2
2005	Mücke Motorsport	AMG-Mercedes C-Klasse 2004	HOC; 7	LAU; 8	SPA; 12	BRN; Ret	OSC; 11	NOR; Ret	NÜR; 17	ZAN; Ret	LAU; Ret	IST; 9	HOC; 11										18th	3
2006	Mücke Motorsport	AMG-Mercedes C-Klasse 2005	HOC; Ret	LAU; 12	OSC; 12	BRH; 13	NOR; 4	NÜR; 11	ZAN; 7	CAT; 12	BUG; 15	HOC; Ret											12th	7

^{1} – Shanghai was a non-championship round.

- † — Retired, but was classified as he completed 90% of the winner's race distance.

=== Complete 24 Hours of Le Mans results ===
Year	Team	Co-Drivers	Car	Class	Laps	Pos.	Class Pos.
2007	(Czech Republic) Charouz Racing System	(Czech Republic) Jan Charouz (Malaysia) Alex Yoong	Lola B07/17-Judd	LMP1	338	8th	5th
2008	(Czech Republic) Charouz Racing System (United Kingdom) Aston Martin Racing	(Czech Republic) Jan Charouz (Czech Republic) Tomáš Enge	Lola B08/60-Aston Martin	LMP1	354	9th	9th
2009	(Czech Republic) AMR Eastern Europe	(Czech Republic) Jan Charouz (Czech Republic) Tomáš Enge	Lola-Aston Martin B09/60	LMP1	373	4th	4th
2010	(United Kingdom) Aston Martin Racing	(Switzerland) Harold Primat (Mexico) Adrián Fernández	Lola-Aston Martin B09/60	LMP1	365	6th	5th
2011	(United Kingdom) Aston Martin Racing	(United Kingdom) Darren Turner (Austria) Christian Klien	Aston Martin AMR-One	LMP1	4	DNF	DNF
2012	(United Kingdom) Aston Martin Racing	(Mexico) Adrián Fernández (United Kingdom) Darren Turner	Aston Martin Vantage GTE	GTE; Pro	332	19th	**3rd**
2013	(United Kingdom) Aston Martin Racing	(United Kingdom) Darren Turner (United Kingdom) Peter Dumbreck	Aston Martin Vantage GTE	GTE; Pro	314	17th	**3rd**
2014	(United Kingdom) Aston Martin Racing	(United Kingdom) Darren Turner (Brazil) Bruno Senna	Aston Martin Vantage GTE	GTE; Pro	310	35th	6th
2015	(United Kingdom) Aston Martin Racing	(United Kingdom) Darren Turner (United Kingdom) Rob Bell	Aston Martin Vantage GTE	GTE; Pro	110	DNF	DNF
2016	(United States) Ford Chip Ganassi Team UK	(United States) Billy Johnson (France) Olivier Pla	Ford GT	GTE; Pro	339	21st	4th
2017	(United States) Ford Chip Ganassi Team UK	(United States) Billy Johnson (France) Olivier Pla	Ford GT	GTE; Pro	332	27th	10th
2018	(United States) Ford Chip Ganassi Team UK	(United States) Billy Johnson (France) Olivier Pla	Ford GT	GTE; Pro	340	21st	6th
2019	(United States) Ford Chip Ganassi Team UK	(United States) Billy Johnson (France) Olivier Pla	Ford GT	GTE; Pro	340	25th	6th

=== Complete GT1 World Championship results ===
Year	Team	Car	1	2	3	4	5	6	7	8	9	10	11	12	13	14	15	16	17	18	19	20	Pos	Points
2010	Young Driver AMR	Aston Martin	ABU; QR; 4	ABU; CR; Ret	SIL; QR; Ret	SIL; CR; 5	BRN; QR; 11	BRN; CR; Ret	PRI; QR; Ret	PRI; CR; 20	SPA; QR; 3	SPA; CR; Ret	NÜR; QR; 9	NÜR; CR; 5	ALG; QR; 15	ALG; CR; 11	NAV; QR; DNS	NAV; CR; DNS	INT; QR; 12	INT; CR; 11	SAN; QR; Ret	SAN; CR; 5	20th	34
2011	Young Driver AMR	Aston Martin	ABU; QR; Ret	ABU; CR; 5	ZOL; QR; Ret	ZOL; CR; 7	ALG; QR; 4	ALG; CR; 2	SAC; QR; 3	SAC; CR; 3	SIL; QR; Ret	SIL; CR; Ret	NAV; QR; 6	NAV; CR; Ret	PRI; QR; 3	PRI; CR; 2	ORD; QR; 7	ORD; CR; 5	BEI; QR; 2	BEI; CR; 1	SAN; QR; DNS	SAN; CR; DNS	**2nd**	**120**

=== Complete FIA World Endurance Championship results ===
(key) (Races in bold indicate pole position; races in italics indicate fastest lap)

Year	Entrant	Class	Car	Engine	1	2	3	4	5	6	7	8	9	Rank	Points
2012	Aston Martin Racing	LMGTE Pro	Aston Martin Vantage GTE	Aston Martin 4.5 L V8	SEB; 3	SPA; Ret	LMS; 3	SIL; 2	**SÃO**; 2	**BHR**; 2	FUJ; 3	**SHA**; 1		35th	7
2013	Aston Martin Racing	LMGTE Pro	Aston Martin Vantage GTE	Aston Martin 4.5 L V8	**SIL**; 1	SPA; 4	LMS; 3	SÃO; 2	COA; Ret	**FUJ**; 1	**SHA**; 1	BHR; Ret		3rd	125.5
2014	Aston Martin Racing	LMGTE Pro	Aston Martin Vantage GTE	Aston Martin 4.5 L V8	SIL; 3	SPA; 4	LMS; 10	COA; 1	FUJ; 9	**SHA**; Ret	**BHR**; 2	**SÃO**; 1		5th	102
2015	Aston Martin Racing	LMGTE Pro	Aston Martin Vantage GTE	Aston Martin 4.5 L V8	SIL; 5	SPA; 5	LMS; Ret	NÜR; 6	COA					18th	34
2015	Aston Martin Racing V8	LMGTE Pro	Aston Martin Vantage GTE	Aston Martin 4.5 L V8						FUJ; 7	SHA	BHR		18th	34
2016	Ford Chip Ganassi Team UK	LMGTE Pro	Ford GT	Ford EcoBoost 3.5 L Turbo V6	SIL; 5	SPA; Ret	LMS; 1	NÜR; 4	MEX; 11	COA; 13	**FUJ**; 2	SHA; 2	BHR; 6	4th	118
2017	Ford Chip Ganassi Team UK	LMGTE Pro	Ford GT	Ford EcoBoost 3.5 L Turbo V6	SIL; 4	SPA; 3	LMS; 6	NÜR; 6	MEX; 7	COA; 8	FUJ; 4	SHA; 4	BHR; 5	8th	95
2018–19	Ford Chip Ganassi Team UK	LMGTE Pro	Ford GT	Ford EcoBoost 3.5 L Turbo V6	SPA; 1	LMS; 3	**SIL**; 6	FUJ; 8	**SHA**; 7	SEB; 18	SPA; 10	LMS; 4		5th	88

=== Complete European Le Mans Series results ===
Year	Entrant	Class	Chassis	Engine	1	2	3	4	5	6	Rank	Points
2007	Charouz Racing System	LMP1	Lola B07/17	Judd GV5.5 S2 5.5 L V10	MNZ; 9	VAL; 2	NUR; 4	SPA; 7	SIL; NC	MIL	10th	15
2008	Charouz Racing System	LMP1	Lola B08/60	Aston Martin 6.0 L V12	CAT; 3	MNZ; 8	SPA; 10	NUR; 5	SIL; 2		9th	19
2009	AMR Eastern Europe	LMP1	Lola-Aston Martin B09/60	Aston Martin 6.0 L V12	CAT; 1	SPA; 3	ALG; 2	NUR; 1	SIL; 3		1st	39

Sporting positions
Preceded by None	Formula BMW ADAC; Champion; 1998	Succeeded by André Lotterer
Preceded by Alexandre Prémat; Mike Rockenfeller	Le Mans Series Champion; 2009 with: Jan Charouz; Tomáš Enge	Succeeded by Stéphane Sarrazin
Preceded by Weng Sun Mok	GT Asia Series Champion; 2013	Succeeded by Weng Sun Mok
