= 2018 6 Hours of Spa-Francorchamps =

Sports car endurance racing event in Belgium

Layout of the Circuit de Spa-Francorchamps

The 2018 Total 6 Hours of Spa-Francorchamps was an endurance sports car racing event held at the Circuit de Spa-Francorchamps, Stavelot, Belgium on 3–5 May 2018. Spa-Francorchamps served as the first race of the 2018–19 FIA World Endurance Championship, and was the seventh running of the event as part of the championship. The race was won by the #8 Toyota TS050 Hybrid.

== Qualifying ==
=== Qualifying results ===
Pole position winners in each class are marked in bold.

Pos	Class	Team	Average Time	Gap	Grid
1	**LMP1**	**No. 8 Toyota Gazoo Racing**	**1:54.962**	—	**1**
2	LMP1	No. 1 Rebellion Racing	1:56.425	+1.463	2
3	LMP1	No. 3 Rebellion Racing	1:56.992	+2.030	3
4	LMP1	No. 11 SMP Racing	1:58.247	+3.285	4
5	LMP1	No. 4 ByKolles Racing Team	1:58.697	+3.735	5
6	**LMP2**	**No. 36 Signatech Alpine Matmut**	**2:02.405**	**+7.443**	**6**
7	LMP2	No. 26 G-Drive Racing	2:02.429	+7.467	7
8	LMP2	No. 38 Jackie Chan DC Racing	2:02.824	+7.862	8
9	LMP2	No. 37 Jackie Chan DC Racing	2:03.023	+8.061	9
10	LMP2	No. 31 DragonSpeed	2:03.420	+8.458	15
11	LMP2	No. 28 TDS Racing	2:04.703	+9.741	11
12	LMP2	No. 29 Racing Team Nederland	2:05.502	+10.540	12
13	LMP2	No. 50 Larbre Compétition	2:05.739	+10.777	13
14	**LMGTE Pro**	**No. 67 Ford Chip Ganassi Team UK**	**2:12.947**	**+17.985**	**14**
15	LMGTE Pro	No. 66 Ford Chip Ganassi Team UK	2:13.030	+18.068	15
16	LMGTE Pro	No. 91 Porsche GT Team	2:13.034	+18.072	16
17	LMGTE Pro	No. 92 Porsche GT Team	2:13:352	+18.390	17
18	LMGTE Pro	No. 82 BMW Team MTEK	2:14.017	+19.055	18
19	LMGTE Pro	No. 51 AF Corse	2:14.385	+19.423	19
20	LMGTE Pro	No. 71 AF Corse	2:15.104	+20.142	20
21	LMGTE Pro	No. 97 Aston Martin Racing	2:15.127	+20.165	21
22	LMGTE Pro	No. 81 BMW Team MTEK	2:15.142	+20.180	22
23	LMGTE Pro	No. 95 Aston Martin Racing	2:16.004	+21.042	23
24	**LMGTE Am**	**No. 77 Dempsey-Proton Racing**	**2:16.357**	**+21.395**	**24**
25	LMGTE Am	No. 98 Aston Martin Racing	2:16.359	+21.397	25
26	LMGTE Am	No. 56 Team Project 1	2:16.637	+21.675	26
27	LMGTE Am	No. 88 Dempsey-Proton Racing	2:16.768	+21.806	27
28	LMGTE Am	No. 90 TF Sport	2:17.627	+22.665	28
29	LMGTE Am	No. 70 MR Racing	2:18.582	+23.550	29
30	LMGTE Am	No. 54 Spirit of Race	2:18.917	+23.955	30
31	LMGTE Am	No. 61 Clearwater Racing	2:19.445	+24.483	31
32	LMP1	No. 10 DragonSpeed	1:59.158^{1}	+4.196	WD^{2}
33	LMGTE Am	No. 86 Gulf Racing UK	2:15.332^{3}	+20.370	32
34	LMP1	No. 17 SMP Racing	No Time	—	33
35	LMP1	No. 5 CEFC TRSM Racing	No Time	—	WD^{4}
36	LMP1	No. 6 CEFC TRSM Racing	No Time	—	WD^{4}
EX	LMP1	No. 7 Toyota Gazoo Racing	No Time^{5}	—	PL^{5}

^1 – Only one driver of the No. 10 DragonSpeed set a lap time.
^2 – No.10 DragonSpeed withdrew due to Fittipaldi's high-speed crash at Eau Rouge.
^3 – Only one driver of the No. 86 Gulf Racing set a lap time.
^4 – Both Manor-run Ginettas withdrew after qualifying due to financial issues.
^5 – No.7 Toyota was excluded due to an incorrect declaration of the Fuel Flow Meter and started from the pit lane a lap down.

== Race ==
=== Race result ===
The minimum number of laps for classification (70% of the overall winning car's race distance) was 114 laps. Class winners in bold.

Pos	Class	No	Team	Drivers	Chassis	Tyre	Laps	Time/Retired
Pos	Class	No	Team	Drivers	Engine	Tyre	Laps	Time/Retired
1	**LMP1**	**8**	**(Japan) Toyota Gazoo Racing**	**(Spain) Fernando Alonso (Switzerland) Sébastien Buemi (Japan) Kazuki Nakajima**	**Toyota TS050 Hybrid**	M	**163**	**06:00:50.702**
1	**LMP1**	**8**	**(Japan) Toyota Gazoo Racing**	**(Spain) Fernando Alonso (Switzerland) Sébastien Buemi (Japan) Kazuki Nakajima**	**Toyota 2.4 L Turbo V6**	M	**163**	**06:00:50.702**
2	LMP1	7	(Japan) Toyota Gazoo Racing	(United Kingdom) Mike Conway (Japan) Kamui Kobayashi (Argentina) José María López	Toyota TS050 Hybrid	M	163	+1.444
2	LMP1	7	(Japan) Toyota Gazoo Racing	(United Kingdom) Mike Conway (Japan) Kamui Kobayashi (Argentina) José María López	Toyota 2.4 L Turbo V6	M	163	+1.444
3	LMP1	3	(Switzerland) Rebellion Racing	(Switzerland) Mathias Beche (France) Thomas Laurent (United States) Gustavo Menezes	Rebellion R13	M	161	+2 Laps
3	LMP1	3	(Switzerland) Rebellion Racing	(Switzerland) Mathias Beche (France) Thomas Laurent (United States) Gustavo Menezes	Gibson GL458 4.5 L V8	M	161	+2 Laps
4	LMP1	4	(Austria) ByKolles Racing Team	(United Kingdom) Oliver Webb (Austria) Dominik Kraihamer (France) Tom Dillmann	ENSO CLM P1/01	M	158	+5 Laps
4	LMP1	4	(Austria) ByKolles Racing Team	(United Kingdom) Oliver Webb (Austria) Dominik Kraihamer (France) Tom Dillmann	Nismo VRX30A 3.0 L Turbo V6	M	158	+5 Laps
5	LMP1	11	(Russia) SMP Racing	(Russia) Mikhail Aleshin (Russia) Vitaly Petrov	BR Engineering BR1	M	158	+5 Laps
5	LMP1	11	(Russia) SMP Racing	(Russia) Mikhail Aleshin (Russia) Vitaly Petrov	AER P60B 2.4 L Turbo V6	M	158	+5 Laps
6	**LMP2**	**26**	**(Russia) G-Drive Racing**	**(Russia) Roman Rusinov (France) Jean-Éric Vergne (France) Andrea Pizzitola**	**Oreca 07**	D	**156**	**+7 Laps**
6	**LMP2**	**26**	**(Russia) G-Drive Racing**	**(Russia) Roman Rusinov (France) Jean-Éric Vergne (France) Andrea Pizzitola**	**Gibson GK428 4.2 L V8**	D	**156**	**+7 Laps**
7	LMP2	38	(China) Jackie Chan DC Racing	(China) Ho-Pin Tung (France) Gabriel Aubry (Monaco) Stéphane Richelmi	Oreca 07	D	156	+7 Laps
7	LMP2	38	(China) Jackie Chan DC Racing	(China) Ho-Pin Tung (France) Gabriel Aubry (Monaco) Stéphane Richelmi	Gibson GK428 4.2 L V8	D	156	+7 Laps
8	LMP2	36	(France) Signatech Alpine Matmut	(France) Nicolas Lapierre (Brazil) André Negrão (France) Pierre Thiriet	Alpine A470	D	156	+7 Laps
8	LMP2	36	(France) Signatech Alpine Matmut	(France) Nicolas Lapierre (Brazil) André Negrão (France) Pierre Thiriet	Gibson GK428 4.2 L V8	D	156	+7 Laps
9	LMP2	37	(China) Jackie Chan DC Racing	(Malaysia) Jazeman Jaafar (Malaysia) Weiron Tan (Malaysia) Nabil Jeffri	Oreca 07	D	155	+8 Laps
9	LMP2	37	(China) Jackie Chan DC Racing	(Malaysia) Jazeman Jaafar (Malaysia) Weiron Tan (Malaysia) Nabil Jeffri	Gibson GK428 4.2 L V8	D	155	+8 Laps
10	LMP2	28	(France) TDS Racing	(France) François Perrodo (France) Matthieu Vaxivière (France) Loïc Duval	Oreca 07	D	155	+8 Laps
10	LMP2	28	(France) TDS Racing	(France) François Perrodo (France) Matthieu Vaxivière (France) Loïc Duval	Gibson GK428 4.2 L V8	D	155	+8 Laps
11	LMP2	31	(United States) DragonSpeed	(Mexico) Roberto González (Venezuela) Pastor Maldonado (France) Nathanaël Berthon	Oreca 07	M	155	+8 Laps
11	LMP2	31	(United States) DragonSpeed	(Mexico) Roberto González (Venezuela) Pastor Maldonado (France) Nathanaël Berthon	Gibson GK428 4.2 L V8	M	155	+8 Laps
12	LMP2	50	(France) Larbre Compétition	(France) Erwin Creed (France) Romano Ricci (France) Julien Canal	Ligier JS P217	M	152	+11 Laps
12	LMP2	50	(France) Larbre Compétition	(France) Erwin Creed (France) Romano Ricci (France) Julien Canal	Gibson GK428 4.2 L V8	M	152	+11 Laps
13	**LMGTE; Pro**	**66**	**(United States) Ford Chip Ganassi Team UK**	**(Germany) Stefan Mücke (France) Olivier Pla (United States) Billy Johnson**	**Ford GT**	M	**148**	**+15 Laps**
13	**LMGTE; Pro**	**66**	**(United States) Ford Chip Ganassi Team UK**	**(Germany) Stefan Mücke (France) Olivier Pla (United States) Billy Johnson**	**Ford EcoBoost 3.5 L Turbo V6**	M	**148**	**+15 Laps**
14	LMGTE; Pro	92	(Germany) Porsche GT Team	(Denmark) Michael Christensen (France) Kévin Estre	Porsche 911 RSR	M	148	+15 Laps
14	LMGTE; Pro	92	(Germany) Porsche GT Team	(Denmark) Michael Christensen (France) Kévin Estre	Porsche 4.0 L Flat-6	M	148	+15 Laps
15	LMGTE; Pro	71	(Italy) AF Corse	(Italy) Davide Rigon (United Kingdom) Sam Bird	Ferrari 488 GTE Evo	M	147	+16 Laps
15	LMGTE; Pro	71	(Italy) AF Corse	(Italy) Davide Rigon (United Kingdom) Sam Bird	Ferrari F154CB 3.9 L Turbo V8	M	147	+16 Laps
16	LMGTE; Pro	91	(Germany) Porsche GT Team	(Austria) Richard Lietz (Italy) Gianmaria Bruni	Porsche 911 RSR	M	147	+16 Laps
16	LMGTE; Pro	91	(Germany) Porsche GT Team	(Austria) Richard Lietz (Italy) Gianmaria Bruni	Porsche 4.0 L Flat-6	M	147	+16 Laps
17	LMGTE; Pro	82	(Germany) BMW Team MTEK	(United Kingdom) Tom Blomqvist (Portugal) António Félix da Costa	BMW M8 GTE	M	146	+17 Laps
17	LMGTE; Pro	82	(Germany) BMW Team MTEK	(United Kingdom) Tom Blomqvist (Portugal) António Félix da Costa	BMW S63 4.0 L Turbo V8	M	146	+17 Laps
18	LMGTE; Pro	97	(United Kingdom) Aston Martin Racing	(United Kingdom) Alex Lynn (Belgium) Maxime Martin (United Kingdom) Jonathan Adam	Aston Martin Vantage AMR	M	146	+17 Laps
18	LMGTE; Pro	97	(United Kingdom) Aston Martin Racing	(United Kingdom) Alex Lynn (Belgium) Maxime Martin (United Kingdom) Jonathan Adam	Aston Martin 4.0 L Turbo V8	M	146	+17 Laps
19	LMGTE; Pro	95	(United Kingdom) Aston Martin Racing	(Denmark) Marco Sørensen (Denmark) Nicki Thiim (United Kingdom) Darren Turner	Aston Martin Vantage AMR	M	146	+17 Laps
19	LMGTE; Pro	95	(United Kingdom) Aston Martin Racing	(Denmark) Marco Sørensen (Denmark) Nicki Thiim (United Kingdom) Darren Turner	Aston Martin 4.0 L Turbo V8	M	146	+17 Laps
20	LMGTE; Pro	81	(Germany) BMW Team MTEK	(Germany) Martin Tomczyk (Netherlands) Nick Catsburg	BMW M8 GTE	M	145	+18 Laps
20	LMGTE; Pro	81	(Germany) BMW Team MTEK	(Germany) Martin Tomczyk (Netherlands) Nick Catsburg	BMW S63 4.0 L Turbo V8	M	145	+18 Laps
21	**LMGTE; Am**	**98**	**(United Kingdom) Aston Martin Racing**	**(Canada) Paul Dalla Lana (Portugal) Pedro Lamy (Austria) Mathias Lauda**	**Aston Martin Vantage GTE**	M	**144**	**+19 Laps**
21	**LMGTE; Am**	**98**	**(United Kingdom) Aston Martin Racing**	**(Canada) Paul Dalla Lana (Portugal) Pedro Lamy (Austria) Mathias Lauda**	**Aston Martin 4.5 L V8**	M	**144**	**+19 Laps**
22	LMGTE; Am	90	(United Kingdom) TF Sport	(Turkey) Salih Yoluç (United Kingdom) Euan Alers-Hankey (United Kingdom) Charlie Eastwood	Aston Martin Vantage GTE	M	144	+19 Laps
22	LMGTE; Am	90	(United Kingdom) TF Sport	(Turkey) Salih Yoluç (United Kingdom) Euan Alers-Hankey (United Kingdom) Charlie Eastwood	Aston Martin 4.5 L V8	M	144	+19 Laps
23	LMGTE; Am	61	(Singapore) Clearwater Racing	(Malaysia) Weng Sun Mok (Japan) Keita Sawa (Republic of Ireland) Matt Griffin	Ferrari 488 GTE	M	143	+20 Laps
23	LMGTE; Am	61	(Singapore) Clearwater Racing	(Malaysia) Weng Sun Mok (Japan) Keita Sawa (Republic of Ireland) Matt Griffin	Ferrari F154CB 3.9 L Turbo V8	M	143	+20 Laps
24	LMGTE; Am	77	(Germany) Dempsey-Proton Racing	(Germany) Christian Ried (France) Julien Andlauer (Australia) Matt Campbell	Porsche 911 RSR	M	142	+21 Laps
24	LMGTE; Am	77	(Germany) Dempsey-Proton Racing	(Germany) Christian Ried (France) Julien Andlauer (Australia) Matt Campbell	Porsche 4.0 L Flat-6	M	142	+21 Laps
25	LMGTE; Am	70	(Japan) MR Racing	(Japan) Motoaki Ishikawa (Monaco) Olivier Beretta (Italy) Eddie Cheever III	Ferrari 488 GTE	M	142	+21 Laps
25	LMGTE; Am	70	(Japan) MR Racing	(Japan) Motoaki Ishikawa (Monaco) Olivier Beretta (Italy) Eddie Cheever III	Ferrari F154CB 3.9 L Turbo V8	M	142	+21 Laps
26	LMGTE; Am	88	(Germany) Dempsey-Proton Racing	(United Arab Emirates) Khaled Al Qubaisi (Italy) Gianluca Roda (Italy) Matteo Cairoli	Porsche 911 RSR	M	141	+22 Laps
26	LMGTE; Am	88	(Germany) Dempsey-Proton Racing	(United Arab Emirates) Khaled Al Qubaisi (Italy) Gianluca Roda (Italy) Matteo Cairoli	Porsche 4.0 L Flat-6	M	141	+22 Laps
27	LMGTE; Pro	51	(Italy) AF Corse	(Italy) Alessandro Pier Guidi (United Kingdom) James Calado	Ferrari 488 GTE Evo	M	139	+24 Laps
27	LMGTE; Pro	51	(Italy) AF Corse	(Italy) Alessandro Pier Guidi (United Kingdom) James Calado	Ferrari F154CB 3.9 L Turbo V8	M	139	+24 Laps
28	LMP2	29	(Netherlands) Racing Team Nederland	(Netherlands) Frits van Eerd (Netherlands) Giedo van der Garde (Netherlands) Jan Lammers	Dallara P217	M	139	+24 laps
28	LMP2	29	(Netherlands) Racing Team Nederland	(Netherlands) Frits van Eerd (Netherlands) Giedo van der Garde (Netherlands) Jan Lammers	Gibson GK428 4.2 L V8	M	139	+24 laps
29	LMGTE; Am	86	(United Kingdom) Gulf Racing UK	(United Kingdom) Michael Wainwright (United Kingdom) Ben Barker (Australia) Alex Davison	Porsche 911 RSR	M	137	+26 Laps
29	LMGTE; Am	86	(United Kingdom) Gulf Racing UK	(United Kingdom) Michael Wainwright (United Kingdom) Ben Barker (Australia) Alex Davison	Porsche 4.0 L Flat-6	M	137	+26 Laps
30	LMGTE; Am	54	(Switzerland) Spirit of Race	(Switzerland) Thomas Flohr (Italy) Francesco Castellacci (Italy) Giancarlo Fisichella	Ferrari 488 GTE	M	136	+27 Laps
30	LMGTE; Am	54	(Switzerland) Spirit of Race	(Switzerland) Thomas Flohr (Italy) Francesco Castellacci (Italy) Giancarlo Fisichella	Ferrari F154CB 3.9 L Turbo V8	M	136	+27 Laps
31	LMGTE; Am	56	(Germany) Team Project 1	(Germany) Jörg Bergmeister (United States) Patrick Lindsey (Norway) Egidio Perfetti	Porsche 911 RSR	M	131	+32 Laps
31	LMGTE; Am	56	(Germany) Team Project 1	(Germany) Jörg Bergmeister (United States) Patrick Lindsey (Norway) Egidio Perfetti	Porsche 4.0 L Flat-6	M	131	+32 Laps
DSQ	LMP1	1	(Switzerland) Rebellion Racing	(Switzerland) Neel Jani (Germany) André Lotterer (Brazil) Bruno Senna	Rebellion R13	M	161	Disqualified (Note: The No. 1 Rebellion was disqualified from the race after the car was found to have had a skid block worn beyond allowable limits.)
DSQ	LMP1	1	(Switzerland) Rebellion Racing	(Switzerland) Neel Jani (Germany) André Lotterer (Brazil) Bruno Senna	Gibson GL458 4.5 L V8	M	161	Disqualified
DNF	LMP1	17	(Russia) SMP Racing	(France) Stéphane Sarrazin (Russia) Egor Orudzhev (Russia) Matevos Isaakyan	BR Engineering BR1	M	132	Collision
DNF	LMP1	17	(Russia) SMP Racing	(France) Stéphane Sarrazin (Russia) Egor Orudzhev (Russia) Matevos Isaakyan	AER P60B 2.4 L Turbo V6	M	132	Collision
DNF	LMGTE; Pro	67	(United States) Ford Chip Ganassi Team UK	(United Kingdom) Andy Priaulx (United Kingdom) Harry Tincknell (Brazil) Tony Kanaan	Ford GT	M	26	Collision
DNF	LMGTE; Pro	67	(United States) Ford Chip Ganassi Team UK	(United Kingdom) Andy Priaulx (United Kingdom) Harry Tincknell (Brazil) Tony Kanaan	Ford EcoBoost 3.5 L Turbo V6	M	26	Collision
DNS	LMP1	10	(United States) DragonSpeed	(United Kingdom) Ben Hanley (Sweden) Henrik Hedman (Brazil) Pietro Fittipaldi	BR Engineering BR1	M	–	Did Not Start
DNS	LMP1	10	(United States) DragonSpeed	(United Kingdom) Ben Hanley (Sweden) Henrik Hedman (Brazil) Pietro Fittipaldi	AER P60B 2.4 L Turbo V6	M	–	Did Not Start
WD	LMP1	5	(China) CEFC TRSM Racing	(United Kingdom) Charlie Robertson (United Kingdom) Dean Stoneman	Ginetta G60-LT-P1	M	–	Withdrew
WD	LMP1	5	(China) CEFC TRSM Racing	(United Kingdom) Charlie Robertson (United Kingdom) Dean Stoneman	Mecachrome V634P1 3.4 L Turbo V6	M	–	Withdrew
WD	LMP1	6	(China) CEFC TRSM Racing	(United Kingdom) Oliver Rowland (United Kingdom) Alex Brundle (United Kingdom) Oliver Turvey	Ginetta G60-LT-P1	M	–	Withdrew
WD	LMP1	6	(China) CEFC TRSM Racing	(United Kingdom) Oliver Rowland (United Kingdom) Alex Brundle (United Kingdom) Oliver Turvey	Mecachrome V634P1 3.4 L Turbo V6	M	–	Withdrew

== Standings after the race ==
2018–2019 LMP World Endurance Drivers' Championship

Pos.	+/–	Driver	Points
1		(Spain) Fernando Alonso (Japan) Kazuki Nakajima (Switzerland) Sébastien Buemi	26
2		(Japan) Kamui Kobayashi (United Kingdom) Mike Conway (Argentina) José María López	18
3		(France) Thomas Laurent (United States) Gustavo Menezes (Switzerland) Mathias Beche	15
4		(United Kingdom) Oliver Webb (France) Tom Dillmann (Austria) Dominik Kraihamer	12
5		(Russia) Mikhail Aleshin (Russia) Vitaly Petrov	10

2018–2019 LMP1 World Endurance Championship

Pos.	+/–	Team	Points
1		(Japan) Toyota Gazoo Racing	26
2		(Switzerland) Rebellion Racing	15
3		(Austria) ByKolles Racing Team	12
4		(Russia) SMP Racing	10

- Note: Only the top five positions are included for the Drivers' Championship standings.

2018–2019 World Endurance GTE Drivers' Championship

Pos.	+/–	Driver	Points
1		(United States) Billy Johnson (France) Olivier Pla (Germany) Stefan Mücke	25
2		(Denmark) Michael Christensen (France) Kévin Estre	18
3		(Italy) Davide Rigon (United Kingdom) Sam Bird	15
4		(Italy) Gianmaria Bruni (Austria) Richard Lietz	12
5		(Portugal) António Félix da Costa (United Kingdom) Tom Blomqvist	10

2018–2019 World Endurance GTE Manufacturers' Championship

Pos.	+/–	Constructor	Points
1		(Germany) Porsche	30
2		(United States) Ford	26
3		(Italy) Ferrari	15.5
4		(Germany) BMW	14
5		(United Kingdom) Aston Martin	14

- Note: Only the top five positions are included for the Drivers' Championship standings.

== Notes ==
FIA World Endurance Championship
Previous race: None	2018–19 season	Next race: 24 Hours of Le Mans
