= BR Engineering BR1 =

Sports prototype racing car

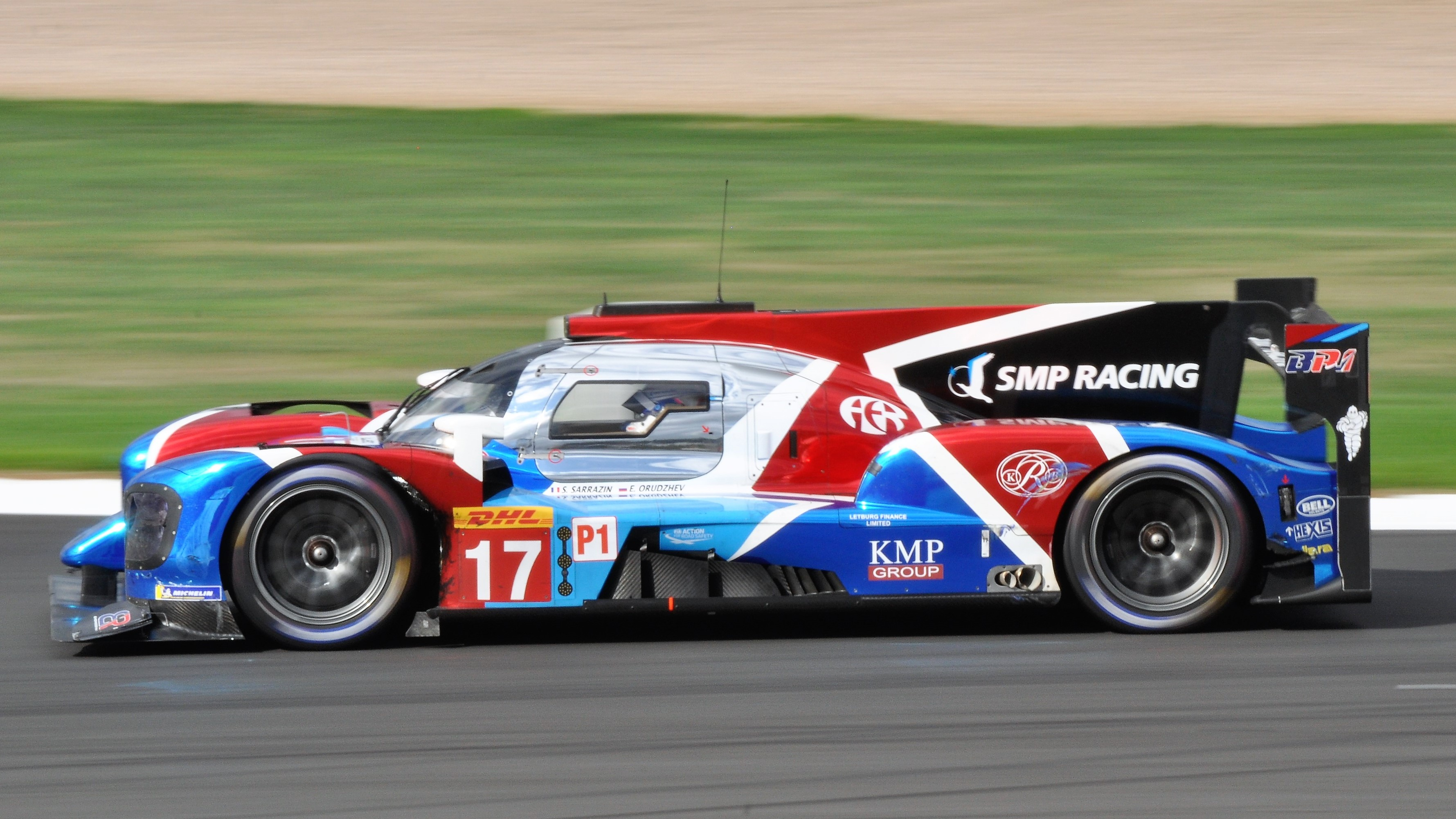
- The No. 17 BR1 at the 2018 6 Hours of Silverstone
- Category: Le Mans Prototype (LMP1)
- Constructor: BR Engineering (Dallara)
- Designer: Luca Pignacca

Technical specifications
- Chassis: Carbon fibre composite monocoque
- Suspension (front): Independent double wishbones with adjustable dampers
- Suspension (rear): Independent double wishbones with adjustable dampers
- Engine: AER P60B 2.4 L V6 turbocharged (SMP Racing); Gibson GL458 4.5 L V8 naturally aspirated (DragonSpeed)
- Transmission: X-Trac 6-speed sequential manual
- Power: AER 2.4L V6 Turbo: 720 bhp (730 PS; 537 kW); Gibson 4.5L V8 N/A: 700 bhp (710 PS; 522 kW)
- Weight: 833 kg (1,836 lb)
- Fuel: Gazprom Energy; Gulf
- Brakes: Carbon Fibre Discs Ventilated
- Tyres: Michelin

Competition history
- Notable entrants: (Russia) SMP Racing (United States) DragonSpeed
- Notable drivers: (Russia) Mikhail Aleshin (United Kingdom) Jenson Button (Brazil) Pietro Fittipaldi (United Kingdom) Ben Hanley (Sweden) Henrik Hedman (Russia) Matevos Isaakyan (Russia) Egor Orudzhev (Russia) Vitaly Petrov (France) Stéphane Sarrazin (Netherlands) Renger van der Zande (Australia) James Allen (New Zealand) Brendon Hartley (Belgium) Stoffel Vandoorne (Russia) Sergey Sirotkin (Russia) Kirill Ladygin (Russia) Viktor Shaytar
- Debut: 2018 6 Hours of Spa-Francorchamps
- Last event: 2019 24 Hours of Le Mans
Races	Wins	Podiums	Poles	F/Laps
8	0	5	0	0
- Teams' Championships: 0
- Drivers' Championships: 0

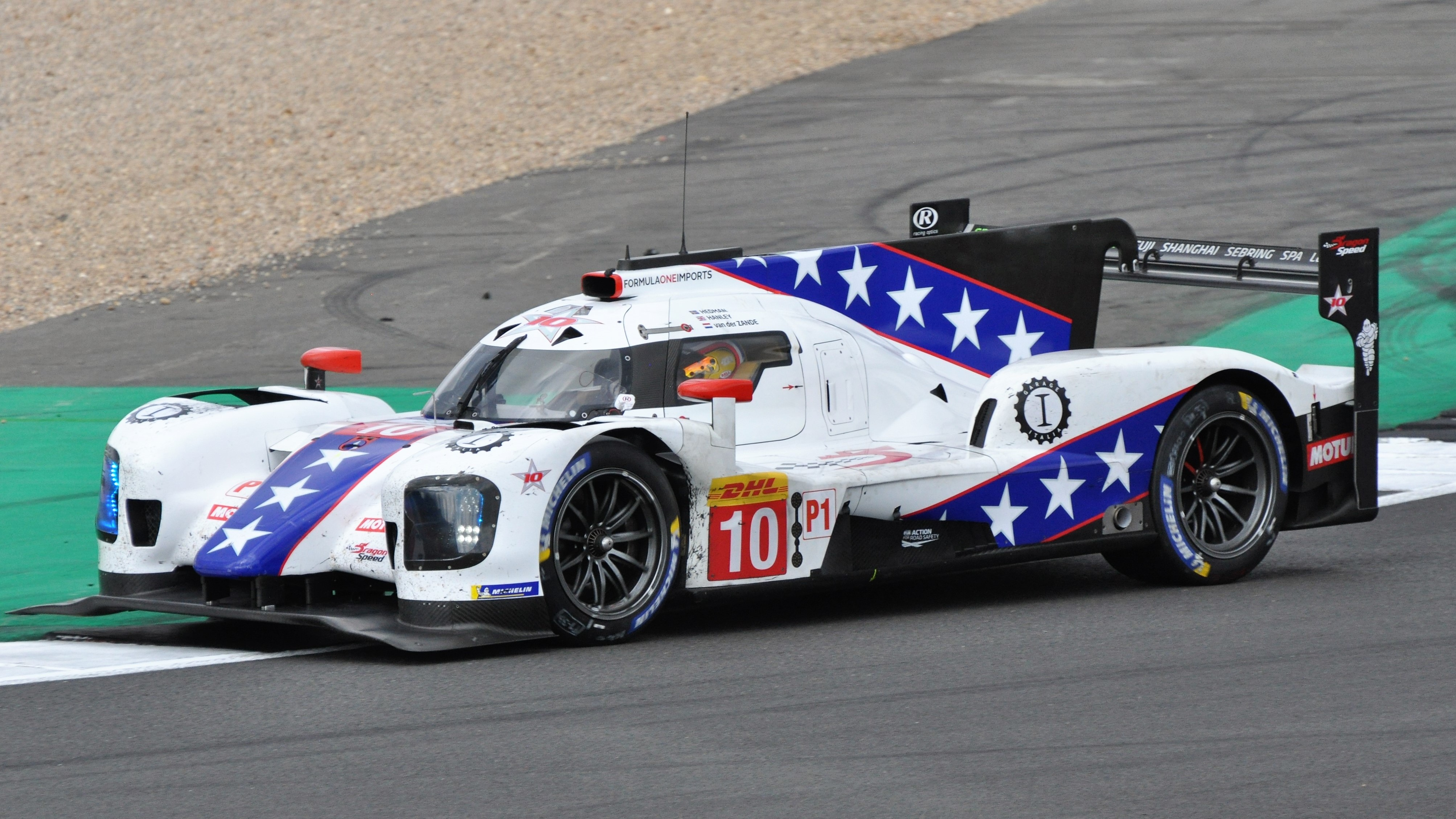
A DragonSpeed liveried BR Engineering BR1 LMP1 car, competing at the 2018 6 Hours of Silverstone

The BR Engineering BR1 is a sports prototype non-hybrid racing car built for the SMP Racing and DragonSpeed teams. It is designed to meet the 2018 LMP1 regulations for Le Mans Prototypes in the FIA World Endurance Championship as well as at the 24 Hours of Le Mans. The BR1 debuted at the 2018 6 Hours of Spa-Francorchamps, the first round of the 2018-19 FIA World Endurance Championship.

== Development ==
SMP Racing were participating in the European Le Mans Series in the LMP2 class, fielding a Dallara P217 chassis. In 2017, with the help of Dallara, BR Engineering and Russian university students designed and built a brand-new chassis, the BR1. Mikhail Aleshin had an arm injury during the first test at Ciudad del Motor de Aragón due to car failure. Prior the official launch at Bahrain the car was also tested by Kirill Ladygin, Vitaly Petrov, Viktor Shaytar and Sergey Sirotkin.

== Competition history ==
=== 2018-19 ===
For the 2018-19 super season, three BR1 chassis were entered; two by SMP Racing and one by DragonSpeed. The cars for the two teams differed by their engine choices; SMP utilizing AER-built P60B 2.4 litre V6 turbocharged engines and DragonSpeed utilizing the Gibson-made GL458 4.5 litre V8 naturally aspirated engine, the same engine used by Rebellion in their R13 prototypes.

The debut of the car at the 6 Hours of Spa-Francorchamps was overshadowed by a qualifying accident involving DragonSpeed's driver Pietro Fittipaldi, in which he sustained fractures to both legs. The car suffered from an electrical problem which caused the car to lose control and run straight into the wall whilst climbing Raidillon and could not be entered into the race. SMP Racing also had technical issues with their #17 entry. Despite this, their #11 entry was able to finish fifth in qualifying. Come race time, car #17 was involved in an accident at the top of Raidillon which sent it flipping through the air. The #11 managed to finish 5th overall.

At Le Mans, DragonSpeed's #10 BR1 crashed at the exit of the Porsche curves with roughly 7:40:00 left in the race, retiring it from the event. The #17 also had an accident at the Porsche curves, severely damaging its rear. Matevos Isaakyan attempted to get it running again but the engine was damaged beyond repair, stopping the car again after rolling for a few meters. The #11 experienced technical issues earlier in the race but was able to rejoin later, finishing in 14th overall and 5th in-class.

At Silverstone, the #11 SMP Racing BR1 experienced an engine failure, retiring it from the race. However, due to both Toyota hybrids being disqualified, the #17 finished third overall behind both Rebellion R13s. Dragonspeed's #10 experienced technical issues, causing it to finish 25th overall but still 4th in-class.

At Fuji, SMP's #17 BR1 lost its front right wheel after it became dislodged. It also experienced technical issues and had to be towed off the circuit. Despite this, the #11 finished 4th overall. Dragonspeed's #10 also developed technical issues and had to be towed off the circuit.

== Complete FIA World Endurance Championship results ==
Results in bold indicate pole position. Results in italics indicate fastest lap.

Year	Entrant	Class	Drivers	No.	1	2	3	4	5	6	7	8	Points	Pos
2018-19	DragonSpeed	LMP1			SPA	LMS	SIL	FUJ	SHA	SEB	SPA	LMS	8.5	5th
2018-19	DragonSpeed	LMP1	(United Kingdom) Ben Hanley	10	DNS	Ret	4	Ret	6	Ret		Ret	8.5	5th
2018-19	DragonSpeed	LMP1	(Sweden) Henrik Hedman	10	DNS	Ret	4			Ret		Ret	8.5	5th
2018-19	DragonSpeed	LMP1	(Brazil) Pietro Fittipaldi	10	DNS								8.5	5th
2018-19	DragonSpeed	LMP1	(Netherlands) Renger van der Zande	10		Ret	4		6	Ret		Ret	8.5	5th
2018-19	DragonSpeed	LMP1	(Australia) James Allen	10				Ret	6				8.5	5th
2018-19	SMP Racing	LMP1	(Russia) Mikhail Aleshin	11	5	Ret	Ret	4	3	3	3	3	94	4th
2018-19	SMP Racing	LMP1	(Russia) Vitaly Petrov	11	5	Ret	Ret	4	3	3	3	3	94	4th
2018-19	SMP Racing	LMP1	(United Kingdom) Jenson Button	11		Ret	Ret	4	3				94	4th
2018-19	SMP Racing	LMP1	(New Zealand) Brendon Hartley	11						3			94	4th
2018-19	SMP Racing	LMP1	(Belgium) Stoffel Vandoorne	11							3	3	94	4th
2018-19	SMP Racing	LMP1	(France) Stéphane Sarrazin	17	Ret	Ret	3	Ret	NC	NC	4	Ret	27	14th
2018-19	SMP Racing	LMP1	(Russia) Egor Orudzhev	17	Ret	Ret	3	Ret	NC	NC	4	Ret	27	14th
2018-19	SMP Racing	LMP1	(Russia) Matevos Isaakyan	17	Ret	Ret		Ret	NC				27	14th
2018-19	SMP Racing	LMP1	(Russia) Sergey Sirotkin	17						NC	4	Ret	27	14th

== See also ==
- Cadillac DPi-V.R
- Dallara P217
