= 2018 6 Hours of Silverstone =

Car racing event in England

Track layout of the Silverstone Circuit

The 2018 6 Hours of Silverstone was an endurance sports car racing event held at the Silverstone Circuit in Northamptonshire, England on 17–19 August 2018. Silverstone served as the third round of the 2018-19 FIA World Endurance Championship, and was the seventh running of the event as part of the championship. The race was won by the #3 Rebellion R13, after the #8 and #7 TS050 Hybrids were disqualified due to excessive wear on their Skid Planks.

== Qualifying ==
=== Qualifying Results ===
Pole position winners in each class are marked in bold.

Pos	Class	Team	Average Time	Gap	Grid
1	**LMP1**	**No. 7 Toyota Gazoo Racing**	**1:36.895**	−	**1**
2	LMP1	No. 8 Toyota Gazoo Racing	1:37.306	+0.411	2
3	LMP1	No. 11 SMP Racing	1:38.932	+2.037	3
4	LMP1	No. 17 SMP Racing	1:39.070	+2.175	4
5	LMP1	No. 3 Rebellion Racing	1:39.247	+2.352	5
6	LMP1	No. 1 Rebellion Racing	1:39.613	+2.718	6
7	LMP1	No. 10 DragonSpeed	1:41.412	+4.517	7
8	LMP1	No. 4 ByKolles Racing Team	1:41.839	+4.944	8
9	**LMP2**	**No. 37 Jackie Chan DC Racing**	**1:44.896**	**+8.001**	**9**
10	LMP2	No. 38 Jackie Chan DC Racing	1:45.083	+8.188	10
11	LMP2	No. 36 Signatech Alpine Matmut	1:46.370	+9.475	11
12	LMP2	No. 28 TDS Racing	1:47.048	+10.153	12
13	LMP2	No. 29 Racing Team Nederland	1:47.107	+10.212	13
14	LMP2	No. 31 DragonSpeed	1:47.270	+10.375	14
15	LMP2	No. 50 Larbre Compétition	1:49.489	+12.594	15
16	**LMGTE Pro**	**No. 66 Ford Chip Ganassi Team UK**	**1:55.727**	**+18.832**	**16**
17	LMGTE Pro	No. 97 Aston Martin Racing	1:55.805	+18.910	17
18	LMGTE Pro	No. 95 Aston Martin Racing	1:56.103	+19.208	18
19	LMGTE Pro	No. 67 Ford Chip Ganassi Team UK	1:56.204	+19.309	19
20	LMGTE Pro	No. 92 Porsche GT Team	1:56.446	+19.551	20
21	LMGTE Pro	No. 71 AF Corse	1:56.510	+19.615	21
22	LMGTE Pro	No. 82 BMW Team MTEK	1:56.731	+19.836	22
23	LMGTE Pro	No. 81 BMW Team MTEK	1:56.992	+20.097	23
24	LMGTE Pro	No. 51 AF Corse	1:57.105	+20.210	24
25	LMGTE Pro	No. 91 Porsche GT Team	1:57.151	+20.256	25
26	**LMGTE Am**	**No. 56 Team Project 1**	**1:59.001**	**+22.106**	**26**
27	LMGTE Am	No. 77 Dempsey - Proton Racing	1:59.203	+22.308	27
28	LMGTE Am	No. 90 TF Sport	1:59.275	+22.380	28
29	LMGTE Am	No. 98 Aston Martin Racing	1:59.338	+22.443	29
30	LMGTE Am	No. 88 Dempsey - Proton Racing	1:59.757	+22.862	30
31	LMGTE Am	No. 54 Spirit of Race	1:59.809	+22.914	31
32	LMGTE Am	No. 70 MR Racing	2.00.003	+23.108	32
33	LMGTE Am	No. 61 Clearwater Racing	2.00.118	+23.223	33
34	LMGTE Am	No. 86 Gulf Racing UK	2.00.221	+23.326	34

== Race ==
Upon starting the Rebellion R-13s were caught out by the No. 17 SMP car, and also, contact in LMGTE Am caused carnage on the first lap, similar to the previous races. On lap 23, Aleshin's engine failed and the car retired. Shortly afterward, the No. 10 suffered a supposed suspension issue, as stated by Hanley. The No. 54 had an issue that tossed off the rear wing, bringing out a yellow. Binder was caught out by slowing LMP2 cars, causing him to spin. The car could not start and retired. Egor Orudzhev's No. 17 lost grip and made contact with Molina, and the No. 71 brought out the safety car for tire debris. The No. 71 ultimately finished second to last, because after the safety car period, the No. 95, from near the LMGTE Pro lead, had a brake repair. The No. 82 had a suspension failure, forcing its retirement, and an FCY to recover it. Late in the race, Sarrazin stopped in the pit lane and had to be pushed to its box. The No. 7 ran wide at Stowe and got a puncture, and the No. 8 took the lead. Lotterer had an unstable rear end and came in for a rear wing change. In the final 30 minutes, the No. 92 of Christensen hit Priaulx's Ford, giving it a penalty even so on the road it was 3rd in class.

=== Post-Race ===
In the post-race, the No. 91 Porsche GT was disqualified for low ride height, same being with both the Nos. 7 & 8 of Toyota, giving Thomas Laurent, Mathias Beche, and Gustavo Menezes the win with Rebellion Racing, the first for a non-hybrid since 2012, when Dumas, Gene, and Duval won in the Audi R18 ultra, and Laurent had the prize of youngest race winner. The podium was then a 1-2 for Rebellion followed by SMP No. 17. In LMP2, Richelmi, Aubry, and Tung won from Jafaar, Jeffri, and Tan, followed by the Le Mans class winners. The disqualification of Lietz/Bruni meant that the LMGTE Pro podium was Calado/ Pier Guidi followed by Priaulx/Tincknell, with Estre/Christensen in third. LMGTE Am, the Le Mans winners finished ahead of TF Sport's Adam/Hankey/Eastwood, completing the podium was Perfetti/ Lindsey/Bergmeister in the "Bumblebee" Project 1.

=== Race Result ===
The minimum number of laps for classification (70% of the overall winning car's race distance) was 135 laps. Class winners in bold.

Pos	Class	No	Team	Drivers	Chassis	Tyre	Laps	Time/Retired
Pos	Class	No	Team	Drivers	Engine	Tyre	Laps	Time/Retired
1	**LMP1**	**3**	**(Switzerland) Rebellion Racing**	**(Switzerland) Mathias Beche (United States) Gustavo Menezes (France) Thomas Laurent**	**Rebellion R13**	MI	**193**	**6:02:10.579**
1	**LMP1**	**3**	**(Switzerland) Rebellion Racing**	**(Switzerland) Mathias Beche (United States) Gustavo Menezes (France) Thomas Laurent**	**Gibson GL458 4.5 L V8**	MI	**193**	**6:02:10.579**
2	LMP1	1	(Switzerland) Rebellion Racing	(Switzerland) Neel Jani (Germany) André Lotterer	Rebellion R13	MI	192	+1 Lap
2	LMP1	1	(Switzerland) Rebellion Racing	(Switzerland) Neel Jani (Germany) André Lotterer	Gibson GL458 4.5 L V8	MI	192	+1 Lap
3	LMP1	17	(Russia) SMP Racing	(Russia) Egor Orudzhev (France) Stéphane Sarrazin	BR Engineering BR1	MI	192	+1 Lap
3	LMP1	17	(Russia) SMP Racing	(Russia) Egor Orudzhev (France) Stéphane Sarrazin	AER P60B 2.4L Turbo V6	MI	192	+1 Lap
4	**LMP2**	**38**	**(China) Jackie Chan DC Racing**	**(France) Gabriel Aubry** **(Monaco) Stéphane Richelmi** **(China) Ho-Pin Tung**	**Oreca 07**	D	185	**+8 Laps**
4	**LMP2**	**38**	**(China) Jackie Chan DC Racing**	**(France) Gabriel Aubry** **(Monaco) Stéphane Richelmi** **(China) Ho-Pin Tung**	**Gibson GK428 4.2L V8**	D	185	**+8 Laps**
5	LMP2	37	(China) Jackie Chan DC Racing	(Malaysia) Jazeman Jaafar (Malaysia) Nabil Jeffri (Malaysia) Weiron Tan	Oreca 07	D	185	+8 Laps
5	LMP2	37	(China) Jackie Chan DC Racing	(Malaysia) Jazeman Jaafar (Malaysia) Nabil Jeffri (Malaysia) Weiron Tan	Gibson GK428 4.2L V8	D	185	+8 Laps
6	LMP2	36	(France) Signatech Alpine Matmut	(France) Nicolas Lapierre (Brazil) André Negrão (France) Pierre Thiriet	Alpine A470	D	183	+10 Laps
6	LMP2	36	(France) Signatech Alpine Matmut	(France) Nicolas Lapierre (Brazil) André Negrão (France) Pierre Thiriet	Gibson GK428 4.2L V8	D	183	+10 Laps
7	LMP2	31	(United States) DragonSpeed	(United Kingdom) Anthony Davidson (Mexico) Roberto González (Venezuela) Pastor Maldonado	Oreca 07	MI	181	+12 Laps
7	LMP2	31	(United States) DragonSpeed	(United Kingdom) Anthony Davidson (Mexico) Roberto González (Venezuela) Pastor Maldonado	Gibson GK428 4.2L V8	MI	181	+12 Laps
8	LMP2	29	(Netherlands) Racing Team Nederland	(Netherlands) Frits van Eerd (Netherlands) Giedo van der Garde (Netherlands) Nyck de Vries	Dallara P217	MI	181	+12 Laps
8	LMP2	29	(Netherlands) Racing Team Nederland	(Netherlands) Frits van Eerd (Netherlands) Giedo van der Garde (Netherlands) Nyck de Vries	Gibson GK428 4.2L V8	MI	181	+12 Laps
9	LMP2	50	(France) Larbre Compétition	(France) Erwin Creed (Japan) Yoshiharu Mori (France) Romano Ricci	Ligier JS P217	MI	176	+17 Laps
9	LMP2	50	(France) Larbre Compétition	(France) Erwin Creed (Japan) Yoshiharu Mori (France) Romano Ricci	Gibson GK428 4.2L V8	MI	176	+17 Laps
10	LMP2	28	(France) TDS Racing	(France) Loïc Duval (France) François Perrodo (France) Matthieu Vaxivière	Oreca 07	D	173	+20 Laps
10	LMP2	28	(France) TDS Racing	(France) Loïc Duval (France) François Perrodo (France) Matthieu Vaxivière	Gibson GK428 4.2L V8	D	173	+20 Laps
11	**LMGTE**; **Pro**	**51**	**(Italy) AF Corse**	**(United Kingdom) James Calado** **(Italy) Alessandro Pier Guidi**	**Ferrari 488 GTE Evo**	MI	**172**	**+21 Laps**
11	**LMGTE**; **Pro**	**51**	**(Italy) AF Corse**	**(United Kingdom) James Calado** **(Italy) Alessandro Pier Guidi**	**Ferrari F154CB 3.9L Turbo V8**	MI	**172**	**+21 Laps**
12	LMGTE; Pro	67	(United States) Ford Chip Ganassi Team UK	(United Kingdom) Andy Priaulx (United Kingdom) Harry Tincknell	Ford GT	MI	172	+21 Laps
12	LMGTE; Pro	67	(United States) Ford Chip Ganassi Team UK	(United Kingdom) Andy Priaulx (United Kingdom) Harry Tincknell	Ford EcoBoost 3.5L Turbo V6	MI	172	+21 Laps
13	LMGTE; Pro	92	(Germany) Porsche GT Team	(Denmark) Michael Christensen (France) Kévin Estre	Porsche 911 RSR	MI	172	+21 Laps
13	LMGTE; Pro	92	(Germany) Porsche GT Team	(Denmark) Michael Christensen (France) Kévin Estre	Porsche 4.0L Flat 6	MI	172	+21 Laps
14	LMGTE; Pro	97	(United Kingdom) Aston Martin Racing	(United Kingdom) Alex Lynn (Belgium) Maxime Martin	Aston Martin Vantage AMR	MI	171	+22 Laps
14	LMGTE; Pro	97	(United Kingdom) Aston Martin Racing	(United Kingdom) Alex Lynn (Belgium) Maxime Martin	Aston Martin 4.0L Turbo V8	MI	171	+22 Laps
15	LMGTE; Pro	81	(Germany) BMW Team MTEK	(Netherlands) Nicky Catsburg (Germany) Martin Tomczyk	BMW M8 GTE	MI	171	+22 Laps
15	LMGTE; Pro	81	(Germany) BMW Team MTEK	(Netherlands) Nicky Catsburg (Germany) Martin Tomczyk	BMW S63 4.0L Turbo V8	MI	171	+22 Laps
16	LMGTE; Pro	66	(United States) Ford Chip Ganassi Team UK	(Germany) Stefan Mücke (France) Olivier Pla	Ford GT	MI	170	+23 Laps
16	LMGTE; Pro	66	(United States) Ford Chip Ganassi Team UK	(Germany) Stefan Mücke (France) Olivier Pla	Ford EcoBoost 3.5L Turbo V6	MI	170	+23 Laps
17	**LMGTE**; **Am**	**77**	**(Germany) Dempsey - Proton Racing**	**(France) Julien Andlauer** **(Australia) Matt Campbell** **(Germany) Christian Ried**	**Porsche 911 RSR**	MI	**168**	**+25 Laps**
17	**LMGTE**; **Am**	**77**	**(Germany) Dempsey - Proton Racing**	**(France) Julien Andlauer** **(Australia) Matt Campbell** **(Germany) Christian Ried**	**Porsche 4.0L Flat 6**	MI	**168**	**+25 Laps**
18	LMGTE; Am	90	(United Kingdom) TF Sport	(United Kingdom) Jonathan Adam (Republic of Ireland) Charlie Eastwood (Turkey) Salih Yoluç	Aston Martin Vantage GTE	MI	168	+25 Laps
18	LMGTE; Am	90	(United Kingdom) TF Sport	(United Kingdom) Jonathan Adam (Republic of Ireland) Charlie Eastwood (Turkey) Salih Yoluç	Aston Martin 4.5L V8	MI	168	+25 Laps
19	LMGTE; Am	56	(Germany) Team Project 1	(Germany) Jörg Bergmeister (United States) Patrick Lindsey (Norway) Egidio Perfetti	Porsche 911 RSR	MI	168	+25 Laps
19	LMGTE; Am	56	(Germany) Team Project 1	(Germany) Jörg Bergmeister (United States) Patrick Lindsey (Norway) Egidio Perfetti	Porsche 4.0L Flat 6	MI	168	+25 Laps
20	LMGTE; Am	98	(United Kingdom) Aston Martin Racing	(Canada) Paul Dalla Lana (Portugal) Pedro Lamy (Austria) Mathias Lauda	Aston Martin Vantage GTE	MI	168	+25 Laps
20	LMGTE; Am	98	(United Kingdom) Aston Martin Racing	(Canada) Paul Dalla Lana (Portugal) Pedro Lamy (Austria) Mathias Lauda	Aston Martin 4.5L V8	MI	168	+25 Laps
21	LMGTE; Am	61	(Singapore) Clearwater Racing	(Republic of Ireland) Matt Griffin (Japan) Keita Sawa (Malaysia) Weng Sun Mok	Ferrari 488 GTE	MI	167	+26 Laps
21	LMGTE; Am	61	(Singapore) Clearwater Racing	(Republic of Ireland) Matt Griffin (Japan) Keita Sawa (Malaysia) Weng Sun Mok	Ferrari F154CB 3.9 L Turbo V8	MI	167	+26 Laps
22	LMGTE; Am	86	(United Kingdom) Gulf Racing UK	(United Kingdom) Ben Barker (Australia) Alex Davison (United Kingdom) Michael Wainwright	Porsche 911 RSR	MI	167	+26 Laps
22	LMGTE; Am	86	(United Kingdom) Gulf Racing UK	(United Kingdom) Ben Barker (Australia) Alex Davison (United Kingdom) Michael Wainwright	Porsche 4.0L Flat 6	MI	167	+26 Laps
23	LMGTE; Am	70	(Japan) MR Racing	(Monaco) Olivier Beretta (Italy) Eddie Cheever III (Japan) Motoaki Ishikawa	Ferrari 488 GTE	MI	167	+26 Laps
23	LMGTE; Am	70	(Japan) MR Racing	(Monaco) Olivier Beretta (Italy) Eddie Cheever III (Japan) Motoaki Ishikawa	Ferrari F154CB 3.9 L Turbo V8	MI	167	+26 Laps
24	LMGTE; Am	88	(Germany) Dempsey - Proton Racing	(Italy) Matteo Cairoli (Italy) Gianluca Roda (Italy) Giorgio Roda	Porsche 911 RSR	MI	167	+26 Laps
24	LMGTE; Am	88	(Germany) Dempsey - Proton Racing	(Italy) Matteo Cairoli (Italy) Gianluca Roda (Italy) Giorgio Roda	Porsche 4.0L Flat 6	MI	167	+26 Laps
25	LMP1	10	(United States) DragonSpeed	(United Kingdom) Ben Hanley (Sweden) Henrik Hedman (Netherlands) Renger van der Zande	BR Engineering BR1	MI	165	+28 Laps
25	LMP1	10	(United States) DragonSpeed	(United Kingdom) Ben Hanley (Sweden) Henrik Hedman (Netherlands) Renger van der Zande	Gibson GL458 4.5L V8	MI	165	+28 Laps
26	LMGTE; Am	54	(Switzerland) Spirit of Race	(Italy) Francesco Castellacci (Italy) Giancarlo Fisichella (Switzerland) Thomas Flohr	Ferrari 488 GTE	MI	158	+35 Laps
26	LMGTE; Am	54	(Switzerland) Spirit of Race	(Italy) Francesco Castellacci (Italy) Giancarlo Fisichella (Switzerland) Thomas Flohr	Ferrari F154CB 3.9 L Turbo V8	MI	158	+35 Laps
27	LMGTE; Pro	71	(Italy) AF Corse	(United Kingdom) Sam Bird (Italy) Davide Rigon	Ferrari 488 GTE	MI	157	+36 Laps
27	LMGTE; Pro	71	(Italy) AF Corse	(United Kingdom) Sam Bird (Italy) Davide Rigon	Ferrari F154CB 3.9 L Turbo V8	MI	157	+36 Laps
28	LMGTE; Pro	95	(United Kingdom) Aston Martin Racing	(Denmark) Marco Sørensen (Denmark) Nicki Thiim	Aston Martin Vantage AMR	MI	157	+36 Laps
28	LMGTE; Pro	95	(United Kingdom) Aston Martin Racing	(Denmark) Marco Sørensen (Denmark) Nicki Thiim	Aston Martin 4.0 L Turbo V8	MI	157	+36 Laps
DNF	LMGTE; Pro	82	(Germany) BMW Team MTEK	(Portugal) António Félix da Costa (Brazil) Augusto Farfus	BMW M8 GTE	MI	116	Suspension
DNF	LMGTE; Pro	82	(Germany) BMW Team MTEK	(Portugal) António Félix da Costa (Brazil) Augusto Farfus	BMW S63 4.0 L Turbo V8	MI	116	Suspension
DNF	LMP1	4	(Austria) ByKolles Racing Team	(Austria) René Binder (United Kingdom) Oliver Webb	ENSO CLM P1/01	MI	59	Spin
DNF	LMP1	4	(Austria) ByKolles Racing Team	(Austria) René Binder (United Kingdom) Oliver Webb	Nismo VRX30A 3.0 L Turbo V6	MI	59	Spin
DNF	LMP1	11	(Russia) SMP Racing	(Russia) Mikhail Aleshin (United Kingdom) Jenson Button (Russia) Vitaly Petrov	BR Engineering BR1	MI	23	Engine
DNF	LMP1	11	(Russia) SMP Racing	(Russia) Mikhail Aleshin (United Kingdom) Jenson Button (Russia) Vitaly Petrov	AER P60B 2.4 L Turbo V6	MI	23	Engine
DSQ	LMP1	8	(Japan) Toyota Gazoo Racing	(Spain) Fernando Alonso (Switzerland) Sébastien Buemi (Japan) Kazuki Nakajima	Toyota TS050 Hybrid	MI	197	Disqualified
DSQ	LMP1	8	(Japan) Toyota Gazoo Racing	(Spain) Fernando Alonso (Switzerland) Sébastien Buemi (Japan) Kazuki Nakajima	Toyota 2.4L Turbo V6	MI	197	Disqualified
DSQ	LMP1	7	(Japan) Toyota Gazoo Racing	(United Kingdom) Mike Conway (Japan) Kamui Kobayashi (Argentina) José María López	Toyota TS050 Hybrid	MI	197	Disqualified
DSQ	LMP1	7	(Japan) Toyota Gazoo Racing	(United Kingdom) Mike Conway (Japan) Kamui Kobayashi (Argentina) José María López	Toyota 2.4L Turbo V6	MI	197	Disqualified
DSQ	LMGTE; Pro	91	(Germany) Porsche GT Team	(Italy) Gianmaria Bruni (Austria) Richard Lietz	Porsche 911 RSR	MI	172	Disqualified
DSQ	LMGTE; Pro	91	(Germany) Porsche GT Team	(Italy) Gianmaria Bruni (Austria) Richard Lietz	Porsche 4.0 L Flat 6	MI	172	Disqualified

== Standings after the race ==
2018–2019 LMP World Endurance Drivers' Championship

Pos.	+/–	Driver	Points
1		(Spain) Fernando Alonso (Japan) Kazuki Nakajima (Switzerland) Sébastien Buemi	65
2	1	(France) Thomas Laurent (United States) Gustavo Menezes (Switzerland) Mathias Beche	63
3	1	(Japan) Kamui Kobayashi (United Kingdom) Mike Conway (Argentina) José María López	46
4	1	(Switzerland) Neel Jani (Germany) André Lotterer	36
5	1	(France) Nicolas Lapierre (Brazil) André Negrão (France) Pierre Thiriet	29

2018–2019 LMP1 World Endurance Championship

Pos.	+/–	Team	Points
1		(Japan) Toyota Gazoo Racing	66
2		(Switzerland) Rebellion Racing	63
3	1	(Russia) SMP Racing	25
4	1	(Austria) ByKolles Racing Team	12
5		(China) CEFC TRSM Racing	1
6		(United States) DragonSpeed	0.5

- Note: Only the top five positions are included for the Drivers' Championship standings.

2018–2019 World Endurance GTE Drivers' Championship

Pos.	+/–	Driver	Points
1		(Denmark) Michael Christensen (France) Kévin Estre	71
2		(Germany) Stefan Mücke (France) Olivier Pla	57
3	1	(United States) Billy Johnson	48
4	4	(United Kingdom) James Calado (Italy) Alessandro Pier Guidi	43.5
5	2	(Italy) Gianmaria Bruni (Austria) Richard Lietz	40

2018–2019 World Endurance GTE Manufacturers' Championship

Pos.	+/–	Constructor	Points
1		(Germany) Porsche	117
2		(United States) Ford	90
3		(Italy) Ferrari	71
4		(United Kingdom) Aston Martin	46
5		(Germany) BMW	27

- Note: Only the top five positions are included for the Drivers' Championship standings.

FIA World Endurance Championship
Previous race: 24 Hours of Le Mans	2018–19 season	Next race: 6 Hours of Fuji
