= 2018 6 Hours of Fuji =

Sports car endurance race held at Fuji Speedway, Oyama, Japan

Track map of the Fuji Speedway

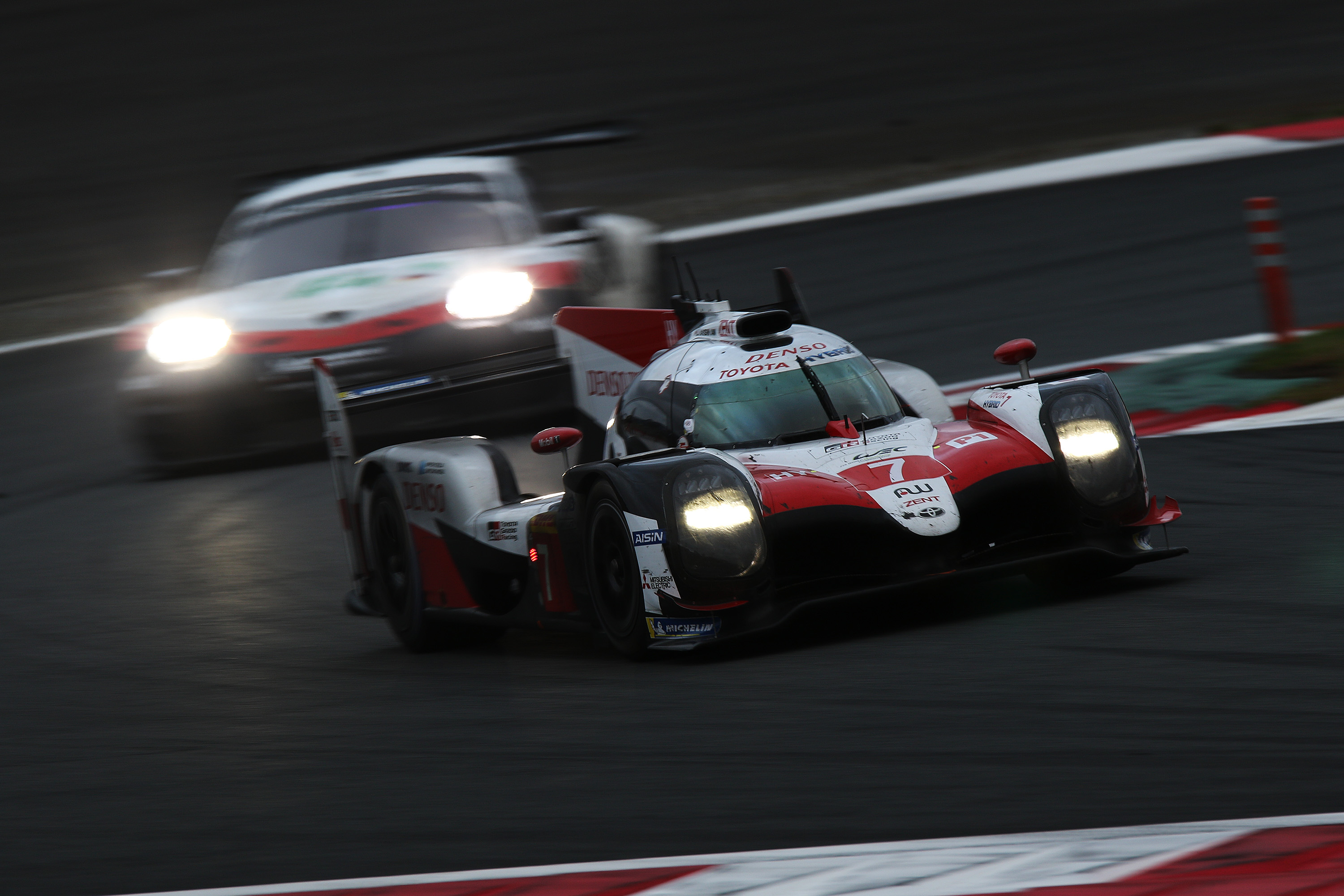
No. 7 Toyota TS050 Hybrid which won the race

The 2018 6 Hours of Fuji was an endurance sports car racing event held at the Fuji Speedway in Oyama, Japan on the 12–14 October 2018. Fuji served as the fourth round of the 2018-19 FIA World Endurance Championship, and was the seventh running of the event as part of the championship. The race was won by the #7 Toyota TS050 Hybrid.

== Qualifying ==
=== Qualifying Results ===
Pole position winners in each class are marked in bold.

Pos	Class	Team	Average Time	Gap	Grid
1	**LMP1**	**No. 8 Toyota Gazoo Racing**	**1:23.648**	-	**1**
2	LMP1	No. 1 Rebellion Racing	1:24.359	+0.711	2
3	LMP1	No. 3 Rebellion Racing	1:24.533	+0.885	3
4	LMP1	No. 17 SMP Racing	1:24.744	+1.096	4
5	LMP1	No. 11 SMP Racing	1:25.146	+1.498	5
6	LMP1	No. 4 ByKolles Racing Team	1:26.579	+2.931	6
7	LMP1	No. 10 DragonSpeed	1:28.207	+4.559	7
8	**LMP2**	**No. 31 DragonSpeed**	**1:28.906**	**+5.258**	**9**
9	LMP2	No. 37 Jackie Chan DC Racing	1:29.203	+5.555	10
10	LMP2	No. 38 Jackie Chan DC Racing	1:29.294	+5.646	11
11	LMP2	No. 36 Signatech Alpine Matmut	1:29.432	+5.784	12
12	LMP2	No. 28 TDS Racing	1:30.795	+7.147	13
13	LMP2	No. 29 Racing Team Nederland	1:31.440	+7.792	14
14	LMP2	No. 50 Larbre Compétition	1:32.677	+9.029	15
15	**LMGTE Pro**	**No. 95 Aston Martin Racing**	**1:36.093**	**+12.445**	**16**
16	LMGTE Pro	No. 82 BMW Team MTEK	1:36.275	+12.627	17
17	LMGTE Pro	No. 97 Aston Martin Racing	1:36.362	+12.714	18
18	LMGTE Pro	No. 67 Ford Chip Ganassi Team UK	1:36.453	+12.805	19
19	LMGTE Pro	No. 71 AF Corse	1:36:542	+12.894	20
20	LMGTE Pro	No. 51 AF Corse	1:36.544	+12.896	21
21	LMGTE Pro	No. 81 BMW Team MTEK	1:36.737	+13.089	22
22	LMGTE Pro	No. 91 Porsche GT Team	1:36.776	+13.128	23
23	LMGTE Pro	No. 66 Ford Chip Ganassi Team UK	1:36.967	+13.319	24
24	LMGTE Pro	No. 92 Porsche GT Team	1:37.109	+13.461	25
25	**LMGTE Am**	**No. 88 Dempsey – Proton Racing**	**1:38.336**	**+14.688**	**26**
26	LMGTE Am	No. 98 Aston Martin Racing	1:38.400	+14.752	27
27	LMGTE Am	No. 77 Dempsey – Proton Racing	1:38.524	+14.876	28
28	LMGTE Am	No. 56 Team Project 1	1:38.578	+14.930	29
29	LMGTE Am	No. 90 TF Sport	1:38.598	+14.950	30
30	LMGTE Am	No. 61 Clearwater Racing	1:39.330	+15.682	31
31	LMGTE Am	No. 86 Gulf Racing UK	1:39.355	+15.707	32
32	LMGTE Am	No. 54 Spirit of Race	1:39.371	+15.723	33
33	LMGTE Am	No. 70 MR Racing	1:39.885	+16.237	34
34	LMP1	No. 7 Toyota Gazoo Racing	1:23.678^{1}	+0.030	8

^1 - All of José María López's lap times were deleted for speeding in the pit lane, resulting in only one driver of the No. 7 Toyota Gazoo Racing being classified as setting a lap time

== Race ==
=== Race result ===
The minimum number of laps for classification (70% of the overall winning car's race distance) was 161 laps. Class winners in bold.

Pos	Class	No	Team	Drivers	Chassis	Tyre	Laps	Time/Retired
Pos	Class	No	Team	Drivers	Engine	Tyre	Laps	Time/Retired
1	**LMP1**	**7**	**(Japan) Toyota Gazoo Racing**	**(United Kingdom) Mike Conway (Japan) Kamui Kobayashi (Argentina) José María López**	**Toyota TS050 Hybrid**	MI	**230**	**6:00:21.800**
1	**LMP1**	**7**	**(Japan) Toyota Gazoo Racing**	**(United Kingdom) Mike Conway (Japan) Kamui Kobayashi (Argentina) José María López**	**Toyota 2.4L Turbo V6**	MI	**230**	**6:00:21.800**
2	LMP1	8	(Japan) Toyota Gazoo Racing	(Spain) Fernando Alonso (Switzerland) Sébastien Buemi (Japan) Kazuki Nakajima	Toyota TS050 Hybrid	MI	230	+11.440
2	LMP1	8	(Japan) Toyota Gazoo Racing	(Spain) Fernando Alonso (Switzerland) Sébastien Buemi (Japan) Kazuki Nakajima	Toyota 2.4L Turbo V6	MI	230	+11.440
3	LMP1	1	(Switzerland) Rebellion Racing	(Switzerland) Neel Jani (Germany) André Lotterer (Brazil) Bruno Senna	Rebellion R13	MI	226	+4 Laps
3	LMP1	1	(Switzerland) Rebellion Racing	(Switzerland) Neel Jani (Germany) André Lotterer (Brazil) Bruno Senna	Gibson GL458 4.5 L V8	MI	226	+4 Laps
4	LMP1	11	(Russia) SMP Racing	(Russia) Mikhail Aleshin (United Kingdom) Jenson Button (Russia) Vitaly Petrov	BR Engineering BR1	MI	219	+7 Laps
4	LMP1	11	(Russia) SMP Racing	(Russia) Mikhail Aleshin (United Kingdom) Jenson Button (Russia) Vitaly Petrov	AER P60B 2.4 L Turbo V6	MI	219	+7 Laps
5	LMP1	4	(Austria) ByKolles Racing Team	(France) Tom Dillmann (United Kingdom) James Rossiter (United Kingdom) Oliver Webb	ENSO CLM P1/01	MI	219	+11 Laps
5	LMP1	4	(Austria) ByKolles Racing Team	(France) Tom Dillmann (United Kingdom) James Rossiter (United Kingdom) Oliver Webb	Nismo VRX30A 3.0 L Turbo V6	MI	219	+11 Laps
6	**LMP2**	**37**	**(China) Jackie Chan DC Racing**	**(Malaysia) Jazeman Jaafar** **(Malaysia) Nabil Jeffri** **(Malaysia) Weiron Tan**	**Oreca 07**	D	**217**	**+13 Laps**
6	**LMP2**	**37**	**(China) Jackie Chan DC Racing**	**(Malaysia) Jazeman Jaafar** **(Malaysia) Nabil Jeffri** **(Malaysia) Weiron Tan**	**Gibson GK428 4.2L V8**	D	**217**	**+13 Laps**
7	LMP2	38	(China) Jackie Chan DC Racing	(France) Gabriel Aubry (Monaco) Stéphane Richelmi (China) Ho-Pin Tung	Oreca 07	D	217	+13 Laps
7	LMP2	38	(China) Jackie Chan DC Racing	(France) Gabriel Aubry (Monaco) Stéphane Richelmi (China) Ho-Pin Tung	Gibson GK428 4.2L V8	D	217	+13 Laps
8	LMP2	36	(France) Signatech Alpine Matmut	(France) Nicolas Lapierre (Brazil) André Negrão (France) Pierre Thiriet	Alpine A470	D	217	+13 Laps
8	LMP2	36	(France) Signatech Alpine Matmut	(France) Nicolas Lapierre (Brazil) André Negrão (France) Pierre Thiriet	Gibson GK428 4.2L V8	D	217	+13 Laps
9	LMP2	28	(France) TDS Racing	(France) Jean-Éric Vergne (France) François Perrodo (France) Matthieu Vaxivière	Oreca 07	D	216	+14 Laps
9	LMP2	28	(France) TDS Racing	(France) Jean-Éric Vergne (France) François Perrodo (France) Matthieu Vaxivière	Gibson GK428 4.2L V8	D	216	+14 Laps
10	LMP2	50	(France) Larbre Compétition	(France) Erwin Creed (Japan) Keiko Ihara (France) Romano Ricci	Ligier JS P217	MI	211	+19 Laps
10	LMP2	50	(France) Larbre Compétition	(France) Erwin Creed (Japan) Keiko Ihara (France) Romano Ricci	Gibson GK428 4.2L V8	MI	211	+19 Laps
11	**LMGTE**; **Pro**	**92**	**(Germany) Porsche GT Team**	**(Denmark) Michael Christensen** **(France) Kévin Estre**	**Porsche 911 RSR**	MI	**207**	**+23 Laps**
11	**LMGTE**; **Pro**	**92**	**(Germany) Porsche GT Team**	**(Denmark) Michael Christensen** **(France) Kévin Estre**	**Porsche 4.0L Flat 6**	MI	**207**	**+23 Laps**
12	LMGTE; Pro	82	(Germany) BMW Team MTEK	(United Kingdom) Tom Blomqvist (Portugal) António Félix da Costa	BMW M8 GTE	MI	207	+23 Laps
12	LMGTE; Pro	82	(Germany) BMW Team MTEK	(United Kingdom) Tom Blomqvist (Portugal) António Félix da Costa	BMW S63 4.0 L Turbo V8	MI	207	+23 Laps
13	LMGTE; Pro	67	(United States) Ford Chip Ganassi Team UK	(United Kingdom) Andy Priaulx (United Kingdom) Harry Tincknell	Ford GT	MI	207	+23 Laps
13	LMGTE; Pro	67	(United States) Ford Chip Ganassi Team UK	(United Kingdom) Andy Priaulx (United Kingdom) Harry Tincknell	Ford EcoBoost 3.5L Turbo V6	MI	207	+23 Laps
14	LMGTE; Pro	51	(Italy) AF Corse	(United Kingdom) James Calado (Italy) Alessandro Pier Guidi	Ferrari 488 GTE Evo	MI	207	+23 Laps
14	LMGTE; Pro	51	(Italy) AF Corse	(United Kingdom) James Calado (Italy) Alessandro Pier Guidi	Ferrari F154CB 3.9L Turbo V8	MI	207	+23 Laps
15	LMGTE; Pro	91	(Germany) Porsche GT Team	(Italy) Gianmaria Bruni (Austria) Richard Lietz	Porsche 911 RSR	MI	207	+23 Laps
15	LMGTE; Pro	91	(Germany) Porsche GT Team	(Italy) Gianmaria Bruni (Austria) Richard Lietz	Porsche 4.0 L Flat 6	MI	207	+23 Laps
16	LMGTE; Pro	95	(United Kingdom) Aston Martin Racing	(Denmark) Marco Sørensen (Denmark) Nicki Thiim	Aston Martin Vantage AMR	MI	206	+24 Laps
16	LMGTE; Pro	95	(United Kingdom) Aston Martin Racing	(Denmark) Marco Sørensen (Denmark) Nicki Thiim	Aston Martin 4.0 L Turbo V8	MI	206	+24 Laps
17	LMGTE; Pro	81	(Germany) BMW Team MTEK	(Netherlands) Nicky Catsburg (Germany) Martin Tomczyk	BMW M8 GTE	MI	206	+24 Laps
17	LMGTE; Pro	81	(Germany) BMW Team MTEK	(Netherlands) Nicky Catsburg (Germany) Martin Tomczyk	BMW S63 4.0L Turbo V8	MI	206	+24 Laps
18	LMGTE; Pro	66	(United States) Ford Chip Ganassi Team UK	(Germany) Stefan Mücke (France) Olivier Pla	Ford GT	MI	206	+24 Laps
18	LMGTE; Pro	66	(United States) Ford Chip Ganassi Team UK	(Germany) Stefan Mücke (France) Olivier Pla	Ford EcoBoost 3.5L Turbo V6	MI	206	+24 Laps
19	LMGTE; Pro	97	(United Kingdom) Aston Martin Racing	(United Kingdom) Alex Lynn (Belgium) Maxime Martin	Aston Martin Vantage AMR	MI	206	+24 Laps
19	LMGTE; Pro	97	(United Kingdom) Aston Martin Racing	(United Kingdom) Alex Lynn (Belgium) Maxime Martin	Aston Martin 4.0L Turbo V8	MI	206	+24 Laps
20	LMP2	31	(United States) DragonSpeed	(United Kingdom) Anthony Davidson (Mexico) Roberto Gonzalez (Venezuela) Pastor Maldonado	Oreca 07	MI	205	+25 Laps
20	LMP2	31	(United States) DragonSpeed	(United Kingdom) Anthony Davidson (Mexico) Roberto Gonzalez (Venezuela) Pastor Maldonado	Gibson GK428 4.2L V8	MI	205	+25 Laps
21	LMP2	29	(Netherlands) Racing Team Nederland	(Netherlands) Frits van Eerd (Netherlands) Giedo van der Garde (Netherlands) Nyck de Vries	Dallara P217	MI	204	+26 Laps
21	LMP2	29	(Netherlands) Racing Team Nederland	(Netherlands) Frits van Eerd (Netherlands) Giedo van der Garde (Netherlands) Nyck de Vries	Gibson GK428 4.2L V8	MI	204	+26 Laps
22	LMGTE; Pro	71	(Italy) AF Corse	(United Kingdom) Sam Bird (Italy) Davide Rigon	Ferrari 488 GTE Evo	MI	202	+28 Laps
22	LMGTE; Pro	71	(Italy) AF Corse	(United Kingdom) Sam Bird (Italy) Davide Rigon	Ferrari F154CB 3.9 L Turbo V8	MI	202	+28 Laps
23	**LMGTE**; **Am**	**56**	**(Germany) Team Project 1**	**(Germany) Jörg Bergmeister** **(United States) Patrick Lindsey** **(Norway) Egidio Perfetti**	**Porsche 911 RSR**	MI	201	+29 Laps
23	**LMGTE**; **Am**	**56**	**(Germany) Team Project 1**	**(Germany) Jörg Bergmeister** **(United States) Patrick Lindsey** **(Norway) Egidio Perfetti**	**Porsche 4.0L Flat 6**	MI	201	+29 Laps
24	LMGTE; Am	90	(United Kingdom) TF Sport	(United Kingdom) Jonathan Adam (Republic of Ireland) Charlie Eastwood (Turkey) Salih Yoluç	Aston Martin Vantage GTE	MI	201	+29 Laps
24	LMGTE; Am	90	(United Kingdom) TF Sport	(United Kingdom) Jonathan Adam (Republic of Ireland) Charlie Eastwood (Turkey) Salih Yoluç	Aston Martin 4.5L V8	MI	201	+29 Laps
25	LMGTE; Am	98	(United Kingdom) Aston Martin Racing	(Canada) Paul Dalla Lana (Portugal) Pedro Lamy (Austria) Mathias Lauda	Aston Martin Vantage GTE	MI	201	+29 Laps
25	LMGTE; Am	98	(United Kingdom) Aston Martin Racing	(Canada) Paul Dalla Lana (Portugal) Pedro Lamy (Austria) Mathias Lauda	Aston Martin 4.5L V8	MI	201	+29 Laps
26	LMGTE; Am	86	(United Kingdom) Gulf Racing UK	(United Kingdom) Ben Barker (Austria) Thomas Preining (United Kingdom) Michael Wainwright	Porsche 911 RSR	MI	201	+29 Laps
26	LMGTE; Am	86	(United Kingdom) Gulf Racing UK	(United Kingdom) Ben Barker (Austria) Thomas Preining (United Kingdom) Michael Wainwright	Porsche 4.0L Flat 6	MI	201	+29 Laps
27	LMGTE; Am	54	(Switzerland) Spirit of Race	(Italy) Francesco Castellacci (Italy) Giancarlo Fisichella (Switzerland) Thomas Flohr	Ferrari 488 GTE	MI	200	+30 Laps
27	LMGTE; Am	54	(Switzerland) Spirit of Race	(Italy) Francesco Castellacci (Italy) Giancarlo Fisichella (Switzerland) Thomas Flohr	Ferrari F154CB 3.9 L Turbo V8	MI	200	+30 Laps
28	LMGTE; Am	61	(Singapore) Clearwater Racing	(Republic of Ireland) Matt Griffin (Japan) Keita Sawa (Malaysia) Weng Sun Mok	Ferrari 488 GTE	MI	200	+30 Laps
28	LMGTE; Am	61	(Singapore) Clearwater Racing	(Republic of Ireland) Matt Griffin (Japan) Keita Sawa (Malaysia) Weng Sun Mok	Ferrari F154CB 3.9 L Turbo V8	MI	200	+30 Laps
DNF	LMP1	10	(United States) DragonSpeed	(Australia) James Allen (United Kingdom) Ben Hanley	BR Engineering BR1	MI	179	Mechanical
DNF	LMP1	10	(United States) DragonSpeed	(Australia) James Allen (United Kingdom) Ben Hanley	Gibson GL458 4.5L V8	MI	179	Mechanical
DNF	LMP1	17	(Russia) SMP Racing	(Russia) Matevos Isaakyan (Russia) Egor Orudzhev (France) Stéphane Sarrazin	BR Engineering BR1	MI	132	Mechanical
DNF	LMP1	17	(Russia) SMP Racing	(Russia) Matevos Isaakyan (Russia) Egor Orudzhev (France) Stéphane Sarrazin	AER P60B 2.4L Turbo V6	MI	132	Mechanical
DNF	LMP1	3	(Switzerland) Rebellion Racing	(Switzerland) Mathias Beche (United States) Gustavo Menezes (France) Thomas Laurent	Rebellion R13	MI	23	Accident
DNF	LMP1	3	(Switzerland) Rebellion Racing	(Switzerland) Mathias Beche (United States) Gustavo Menezes (France) Thomas Laurent	Gibson GL458 4.5 L V8	MI	23	Accident
DNF	LMGTE; Am	70	(Japan) MR Racing	(Monaco) Olivier Beretta (Italy) Eddie Cheever III (Japan) Motoaki Ishikawa	Ferrari 488 GTE	MI	14	Puncture
DNF	LMGTE; Am	70	(Japan) MR Racing	(Monaco) Olivier Beretta (Italy) Eddie Cheever III (Japan) Motoaki Ishikawa	Ferrari F154CB 3.9 L Turbo V8	MI	14	Puncture
DSQ	LMGTE; Am	88	(Germany) Dempsey - Proton Racing	(Italy) Matteo Cairoli (Japan) Satoshi Hoshino (Italy) Gianluca Roda	Porsche 911 RSR	MI	201	Disqualified (Note: Following the 6 Hours of Fuji, Dempsey-Proton Racing was penalized for exceeding the minimum refueling time during pit stops. Upon further investigation, the FIA data loggers for the team's cars were found to have been altered to manipulate the refueling times for the cars for at least two races. The team failed to disclose their consultant who tampered with the loggers, therefore the FIA, disqualified both cars from the 6 Hours of Fuji and nullified all points earned by the team prior to the Shanghai round, including manufacturer points the team had scored for Porsche.)
DSQ	LMGTE; Am	88	(Germany) Dempsey - Proton Racing	(Italy) Matteo Cairoli (Japan) Satoshi Hoshino (Italy) Gianluca Roda	Porsche 4.0L Flat 6	MI	201	Disqualified
DSQ	LMGTE; Am	77	(Germany) Dempsey - Proton Racing	(France) Julien Andlauer (Australia) Matt Campbell (Germany) Christian Ried	Porsche 911 RSR	MI	176	Disqualified
DSQ	LMGTE; Am	77	(Germany) Dempsey - Proton Racing	(France) Julien Andlauer (Australia) Matt Campbell (Germany) Christian Ried	Porsche 4.0L Flat 6	MI	176	Disqualified

== Standings after the race ==
2018–2019 LMP World Endurance Drivers' Championship

Pos.	+/–	Driver	Points
1		(Spain) Fernando Alonso (Japan) Kazuki Nakajima (Switzerland) Sébastien Buemi	84
2	1	(Japan) Kamui Kobayashi (United Kingdom) Mike Conway (Argentina) José María López	71
3	1	(France) Thomas Laurent (United States) Gustavo Menezes (Switzerland) Mathias Beche	63
4		(Switzerland) Neel Jani (Germany) André Lotterer	51
5	2	(Malaysia) Jazeman Jaafar (Malaysia) Weiron Tan (Malaysia) Nabil Jeffri	34

2018–2019 LMP1 World Endurance Championship

Pos.	+/–	Team	Points
1		(Japan) Toyota Gazoo Racing	92
2		(Switzerland) Rebellion Racing	78
3		(Russia) SMP Racing	37
4		(Austria) ByKolles Racing Team	22
5		(China) CEFC TRSM Racing	1
6		(United States) DragonSpeed	0.5

- Note: Only the top five positions are included for the Drivers' Championship standings.

2018–2019 World Endurance GTE Drivers' Championship

Pos.	+/–	Driver	Points
1		(Denmark) Michael Christensen (France) Kévin Estre	96
2		(Germany) Stefan Mücke (France) Olivier Pla	61
3	1	(United Kingdom) James Calado (Italy) Alessandro Pier Guidi	55.5
4	1	(Italy) Gianmaria Bruni (Austria) Richard Lietz	50
5	2	(United States) Billy Johnson	48

2018–2019 World Endurance GTE Manufacturers' Championship

Pos.	+/–	Constructor	Points
1		(Germany) Porsche	148
2		(United States) Ford	96
3		(Italy) Ferrari	84
4		(United Kingdom) Aston Martin	57
5		(Germany) BMW	51

- Note: Only the top five positions are included for the Drivers' Championship standings.

FIA World Endurance Championship
Previous race: 6 Hours of Silverstone	2018–19 season	Next race: 6 Hours of Shanghai
