= 2018 6 Hours of Shanghai =

Car racing event

Track layout of Shanghai International Circuit

The 2018 6 Hours of Shanghai was an endurance sports car racing event held at the Shanghai International Circuit, Shanghai, China on 16–18 November 2018. Shanghai served as the fifth round of the 2018-19 FIA World Endurance Championship, and was the seventh running of the event, all part of the championship. The race was won by the #7 Toyota TS050 Hybrid.

== Qualifying ==
=== Qualifying Results ===
Poles position winners in each class are marked in bold

Pos	Class	Team	Average Time	Gap	Grid
1	**LMP1**	**No. 7 Toyota Gazoo Racing**	**1:42.931**	-	**1**
2	LMP1	No. 8 Toyota Gazoo Racing	1:43.159	+0.228	2
3	LMP1	No. 1 Rebellion Racing	1:43.218	+0.287	3
4	LMP1	No. 17 SMP Racing	1:43.870	+0.939	4
5	LMP1	No. 3 Rebellion Racing	1:44.179	+1.248	5
6	LMP1	No. 10 DragonSpeed	1:44.612	+1.681	6
7	LMP1	No. 11 SMP Racing	1:44.789	+1.858	7
8	LMP1	No. 4 ByKolles Racing Team	1:46.353	+3.422	8
9	**LMP2**	**No. 38 Jackie Chan DC Racing**	**1:48.888**	**+5.957**	**9**
10	LMP2	No. 37 Jackie Chan DC Racing	1:49.138	+6.207	10
11	LMP2	No. 31 DragonSpeed	1:49.857	+6.926	11
12	LMP2	No. 36 Signatech Alpine Matmut	1:50.206	+7.275	12
13	LMP2	No. 28 TDS Racing	1:51.006	+8.075	13
14	LMP2	No. 29 Racing Team Nederland	1:51.657	+8.726	14
15	LMP2	No. 50 Larbre Compétition	1:51.925	+8.994	15
16	**LMGTE Pro**	**No. 66 Ford Chip Ganassi Team UK**	**1:58.627**	**+15.696**	**16**
17	LMGTE Pro	No. 81 BMW Team MTEK	1:58.874	+15.943	17
18	LMGTE Pro	No. 97 Aston Martin Racing	1:59.000	+16.069	18
19	LMGTE Pro	No. 92 Porsche GT Team	1:59.031	+16.100	19
20	LMGTE Pro	No. 82 BMW Team MTEK	1:59.055	+16.124	20
21	LMGTE Pro	No. 95 Aston Martin Racing	1:59.157	+16.226	21
22	LMGTE Pro	No. 67 Ford Chip Ganassi Team UK	1:59.278	+16.347	22
23	LMGTE Pro	No. 91 Porsche GT Team	1:59.286	+16.355	23
24	LMGTE Pro	No. 51 AF Corse	1:59.454	+16.523	24
25	LMGTE Pro	No. 71 AF Corse	1:59.689	+16.758	25
26	LMGTE Pro	No. 64 Corvette Racing	2:00.228	+17.297	26
27	**LMGTE Am**	**No. 98 Aston Martin Racing**	**2:01.884**	**+18.953**	**27**
28	LMGTE Am	No. 77 Dempsey – Proton Racing	2:01.951	+19.020	28
29	LMGTE Am	No. 54 Spirit of Race	2:02.090	+19.159	29
30	LMGTE Am	No. 88 Dempsey – Proton Racing	2:02.115	+19.184	30
31	LMGTE Am	No. 90 TF Sport	2:02.211	+19.280	31
32	LMGTE Am	No. 61 Clearwater Racing	2:02.400	+19.469	32
33	LMGTE Am	No. 56 Team Project 1	2:02.429	+19.498	33
34	LMGTE Am	No. 86 Gulf Racing UK	2:04.241	+21.310	34
35	LMGTE Am	No. 70 MR Racing	2:04.648	+21.717	35

== Race ==
=== Race result ===
The minimum number of laps for classification (70% of the overall winning car's distance) was 80 laps. Class winners in bold

Pos	Class	No	Team	Drivers	Chassis	Tyre	Laps	Time/Retired
Pos	Class	No	Team	Drivers	Engine	Tyre	Laps	Time/Retired
1	**LMP1**	**7**	**(Japan) Toyota Gazoo Racing**	**(United Kingdom) Mike Conway (Japan) Kamui Kobayashi (Argentina) José María López**	**Toyota TS050 Hybrid**	MI	**113**	**6:01:46.414**
1	**LMP1**	**7**	**(Japan) Toyota Gazoo Racing**	**(United Kingdom) Mike Conway (Japan) Kamui Kobayashi (Argentina) José María López**	**Toyota 2.4L Turbo V6**	MI	**113**	**6:01:46.414**
2	LMP1	8	(Japan) Toyota Gazoo Racing	(Spain) Fernando Alonso (Switzerland) Sébastien Buemi (Japan) Kazuki Nakajima	Toyota TS050 Hybrid	MI	113	+1.419
2	LMP1	8	(Japan) Toyota Gazoo Racing	(Spain) Fernando Alonso (Switzerland) Sébastien Buemi (Japan) Kazuki Nakajima	Toyota 2.4L Turbo V6	MI	113	+1.419
3	LMP1	11	(Russia) SMP Racing	(Russia) Mikhail Aleshin (United Kingdom) Jenson Button (Russia) Vitaly Petrov	BR Engineering BR1	MI	112	+1 Lap
3	LMP1	11	(Russia) SMP Racing	(Russia) Mikhail Aleshin (United Kingdom) Jenson Button (Russia) Vitaly Petrov	AER P60B 2.4 L Turbo V6	MI	112	+1 Lap
4	LMP1	1	(Switzerland) Rebellion Racing	(Switzerland) Neel Jani (Germany) André Lotterer (Brazil) Bruno Senna	Rebellion R13	MI	112	+1 Lap
4	LMP1	1	(Switzerland) Rebellion Racing	(Switzerland) Neel Jani (Germany) André Lotterer (Brazil) Bruno Senna	Gibson GL458 4.5 L V8	MI	112	+1 Lap
5	LMP1	3	(Switzerland) Rebellion Racing	(Switzerland) Mathias Beche (United States) Gustavo Menezes (France) Thomas Laurent	Rebellion R13	MI	110	+3 Laps
5	LMP1	3	(Switzerland) Rebellion Racing	(Switzerland) Mathias Beche (United States) Gustavo Menezes (France) Thomas Laurent	Gibson GL458 4.5 L V8	MI	110	+3 Laps
6	LMP1	10	(United States) DragonSpeed	(Australia) James Allen (United Kingdom) Ben Hanley (Netherlands) Renger van der Zande	BR Engineering BR1	MI	110	+3 Laps
6	LMP1	10	(United States) DragonSpeed	(Australia) James Allen (United Kingdom) Ben Hanley (Netherlands) Renger van der Zande	Gibson GL458 4.5L V8	MI	110	+3 Laps
7	**LMGTE**; **Pro**	**95**	**(United Kingdom) Aston Martin Racing**	**(Denmark) Marco Sørensen** **(Denmark) Nicki Thiim**	**Aston Martin Vantage AMR**	MI	**109**	**+4 Laps**
7	**LMGTE**; **Pro**	**95**	**(United Kingdom) Aston Martin Racing**	**(Denmark) Marco Sørensen** **(Denmark) Nicki Thiim**	**Aston Martin 4.0 L Turbo V8**	MI	**109**	**+4 Laps**
8	**LMP2**	**38**	**(China) Jackie Chan DC Racing**	**(France) Gabriel Aubry** **(Monaco) Stéphane Richelmi** **(China) Ho-Pin Tung**	**Oreca 07**	D	**109**	**+4 Laps**
8	**LMP2**	**38**	**(China) Jackie Chan DC Racing**	**(France) Gabriel Aubry** **(Monaco) Stéphane Richelmi** **(China) Ho-Pin Tung**	**Gibson GK428 4.2L V8**	D	**109**	**+4 Laps**
9	LMGTE; Pro	91	(Germany) Porsche GT Team	(Italy) Gianmaria Bruni (Austria) Richard Lietz	Porsche 911 RSR	MI	109	+4 Laps
9	LMGTE; Pro	91	(Germany) Porsche GT Team	(Italy) Gianmaria Bruni (Austria) Richard Lietz	Porsche 4.0 L Flat 6	MI	109	+4 Laps
10	LMGTE; Pro	92	(Germany) Porsche GT Team	(Denmark) Michael Christensen (France) Kévin Estre	Porsche 911 RSR	MI	109	+4 Laps
10	LMGTE; Pro	92	(Germany) Porsche GT Team	(Denmark) Michael Christensen (France) Kévin Estre	Porsche 4.0L Flat 6	MI	109	+4 Laps
11	LMGTE; Pro	97	(United Kingdom) Aston Martin Racing	(United Kingdom) Alex Lynn (Belgium) Maxime Martin	Aston Martin Vantage AMR	MI	109	+4 Laps
11	LMGTE; Pro	97	(United Kingdom) Aston Martin Racing	(United Kingdom) Alex Lynn (Belgium) Maxime Martin	Aston Martin 4.0L Turbo V8	MI	109	+4 Laps
12	LMP2	31	(United States) DragonSpeed	(United Kingdom) Anthony Davidson (Mexico) Roberto Gonzalez (Venezuela) Pastor Maldonado	Oreca 07	MI	109	+4 Laps
12	LMP2	31	(United States) DragonSpeed	(United Kingdom) Anthony Davidson (Mexico) Roberto Gonzalez (Venezuela) Pastor Maldonado	Gibson GK428 4.2L V8	MI	109	+4 Laps
13	LMGTE; Pro	51	(Italy) AF Corse	(United Kingdom) James Calado (Italy) Alessandro Pier Guidi	Ferrari 488 GTE Evo	MI	109	+4 Laps
13	LMGTE; Pro	51	(Italy) AF Corse	(United Kingdom) James Calado (Italy) Alessandro Pier Guidi	Ferrari F154CB 3.9L Turbo V8	MI	109	+4 Laps
14	LMP2	36	(France) Signatech Alpine Matmut	(France) Nicolas Lapierre (Brazil) André Negrão (France) Pierre Thiriet	Alpine A470	D	109	+4 Laps
14	LMP2	36	(France) Signatech Alpine Matmut	(France) Nicolas Lapierre (Brazil) André Negrão (France) Pierre Thiriet	Gibson GK428 4.2L V8	D	109	+4 Laps
15	LMGTE; Pro	71	(Italy) AF Corse	(United Kingdom) Sam Bird (Italy) Davide Rigon	Ferrari 488 GTE	MI	109	+4 Laps
15	LMGTE; Pro	71	(Italy) AF Corse	(United Kingdom) Sam Bird (Italy) Davide Rigon	Ferrari F154CB 3.9 L Turbo V8	MI	109	+4 Laps
16	LMGTE; Pro	66	(United States) Ford Chip Ganassi Team UK	(Germany) Stefan Mücke (France) Olivier Pla	Ford GT	MI	109	+4 Laps
16	LMGTE; Pro	66	(United States) Ford Chip Ganassi Team UK	(Germany) Stefan Mücke (France) Olivier Pla	Ford EcoBoost 3.5L Turbo V6	MI	109	+4 Laps
17	LMGTE; Pro	64	(United States) Corvette Racing	(United Kingdom) Oliver Gavin (United States) Tommy Milner	Chevrolet Corvette C7.R	MI	109	+4 Laps
17	LMGTE; Pro	64	(United States) Corvette Racing	(United Kingdom) Oliver Gavin (United States) Tommy Milner	Chevrolet 5.5 L V8	MI	109	+4 Laps
18	LMGTE; Pro	81	(Germany) BMW Team MTEK	(Netherlands) Nicky Catsburg (Germany) Martin Tomczyk	BMW M8 GTE	MI	109	+4 Laps
18	LMGTE; Pro	81	(Germany) BMW Team MTEK	(Netherlands) Nicky Catsburg (Germany) Martin Tomczyk	BMW S63 4.0L Turbo V8	MI	109	+4 Laps
19	LMGTE; Pro	67	(United States) Ford Chip Ganassi Team UK	(United Kingdom) Andy Priaulx (United Kingdom) Harry Tincknell	Ford GT	MI	109	+4 Laps
19	LMGTE; Pro	67	(United States) Ford Chip Ganassi Team UK	(United Kingdom) Andy Priaulx (United Kingdom) Harry Tincknell	Ford EcoBoost 3.5L Turbo V6	MI	109	+4 Laps
20	LMGTE; Pro	82	(Germany) BMW Team MTEK	(United Kingdom) Tom Blomqvist (Portugal) António Félix da Costa	BMW M8 GTE	MI	108	+5 Laps
20	LMGTE; Pro	82	(Germany) BMW Team MTEK	(United Kingdom) Tom Blomqvist (Portugal) António Félix da Costa	BMW S63 4.0 L Turbo V8	MI	108	+5 Laps
21	**LMGTE**; **Am**	**77**	**(Germany) Dempsey - Proton Racing**	**(France) Julien Andlauer** **(Australia) Matt Campbell** **(Germany) Christian Ried**	**Porsche 911 RSR**	MI	**108**	**+5 Laps**
21	**LMGTE**; **Am**	**77**	**(Germany) Dempsey - Proton Racing**	**(France) Julien Andlauer** **(Australia) Matt Campbell** **(Germany) Christian Ried**	**Porsche 4.0L Flat 6**	MI	**108**	**+5 Laps**
22	LMGTE; Am	56	(Germany) Team Project 1	(Germany) Jörg Bergmeister (United States) Patrick Lindsey (Norway) Egidio Perfetti	Porsche 911 RSR	MI	108	+5 Laps
22	LMGTE; Am	56	(Germany) Team Project 1	(Germany) Jörg Bergmeister (United States) Patrick Lindsey (Norway) Egidio Perfetti	Porsche 4.0L Flat 6	MI	108	+5 Laps
23	LMGTE; Am	88	(Germany) Dempsey - Proton Racing	(United Arab Emirates) Khaled Al Qubaisi (Italy) Matteo Cairoli (Italy) Riccardo Pera	Porsche 911 RSR	MI	108	+5 Laps
23	LMGTE; Am	88	(Germany) Dempsey - Proton Racing	(United Arab Emirates) Khaled Al Qubaisi (Italy) Matteo Cairoli (Italy) Riccardo Pera	Porsche 4.0L Flat 6	MI	108	+5 Laps
24	LMP2	37	(China) Jackie Chan DC Racing	(Malaysia) Jazeman Jaafar (Malaysia) Nabil Jeffri (Malaysia) Weiron Tan	Oreca 07	D	108	+5 Laps
24	LMP2	37	(China) Jackie Chan DC Racing	(Malaysia) Jazeman Jaafar (Malaysia) Nabil Jeffri (Malaysia) Weiron Tan	Gibson GK428 4.2L V8	D	108	+5 Laps
25	LMGTE; Am	54	(Switzerland) Spirit of Race	(Italy) Francesco Castellacci (Italy) Giancarlo Fisichella (Switzerland) Thomas Flohr	Ferrari 488 GTE	MI	108	+5 Laps
25	LMGTE; Am	54	(Switzerland) Spirit of Race	(Italy) Francesco Castellacci (Italy) Giancarlo Fisichella (Switzerland) Thomas Flohr	Ferrari F154CB 3.9 L Turbo V8	MI	108	+5 Laps
26	LMGTE; Am	98	(United Kingdom) Aston Martin Racing	(Canada) Paul Dalla Lana (Portugal) Pedro Lamy (Austria) Mathias Lauda	Aston Martin Vantage GTE	MI	108	+5 Laps
26	LMGTE; Am	98	(United Kingdom) Aston Martin Racing	(Canada) Paul Dalla Lana (Portugal) Pedro Lamy (Austria) Mathias Lauda	Aston Martin 4.5L V8	MI	108	+5 Laps
27	LMGTE; Am	70	(Japan) MR Racing	(Monaco) Olivier Beretta (Italy) Eddie Cheever III (Japan) Motoaki Ishikawa	Ferrari 488 GTE	MI	107	+6 Laps
27	LMGTE; Am	70	(Japan) MR Racing	(Monaco) Olivier Beretta (Italy) Eddie Cheever III (Japan) Motoaki Ishikawa	Ferrari F154CB 3.9 L Turbo V8	MI	107	+6 Laps
28	LMGTE; Am	61	(Singapore) Clearwater Racing	(Republic of Ireland) Matt Griffin (Japan) Keita Sawa (Malaysia) Weng Sun Mok	Ferrari 488 GTE	MI	107	+6 Laps
28	LMGTE; Am	61	(Singapore) Clearwater Racing	(Republic of Ireland) Matt Griffin (Japan) Keita Sawa (Malaysia) Weng Sun Mok	Ferrari F154CB 3.9 L Turbo V8	MI	107	+6 Laps
29	LMGTE; Am	90	(United Kingdom) TF Sport	(United Kingdom) Jonathan Adam (Republic of Ireland) Charlie Eastwood (Turkey) Salih Yoluç	Aston Martin Vantage GTE	MI	105	+8 Laps
29	LMGTE; Am	90	(United Kingdom) TF Sport	(United Kingdom) Jonathan Adam (Republic of Ireland) Charlie Eastwood (Turkey) Salih Yoluç	Aston Martin 4.5L V8	MI	105	+8 Laps
30	LMGTE; Am	86	(United Kingdom) Gulf Racing UK	(United Kingdom) Ben Barker (Austria) Thomas Preining (United Kingdom) Michael Wainwright	Porsche 911 RSR	MI	100	+13 Laps
30	LMGTE; Am	86	(United Kingdom) Gulf Racing UK	(United Kingdom) Ben Barker (Austria) Thomas Preining (United Kingdom) Michael Wainwright	Porsche 4.0L Flat 6	MI	100	+13 Laps
31	LMP2	29	(Netherlands) Racing Team Nederland	(Netherlands) Frits van Eerd (Netherlands) Giedo van der Garde (Netherlands) Nyck de Vries	Dallara P217	MI	99	+14 Laps
31	LMP2	29	(Netherlands) Racing Team Nederland	(Netherlands) Frits van Eerd (Netherlands) Giedo van der Garde (Netherlands) Nyck de Vries	Gibson GK428 4.2L V8	MI	99	+14 Laps
32	LMP2	50	(France) Larbre Compétition	(France) Erwin Creed (France) Enzo Guibbert (France) Romano Ricci	Ligier JS P217	MI	75	+38 Laps
32	LMP2	50	(France) Larbre Compétition	(France) Erwin Creed (France) Enzo Guibbert (France) Romano Ricci	Gibson GK428 4.2L V8	MI	75	+38 Laps
NC (Note: The TDS Racing No. 28 and the SMP Racing No. 17 did not complete the final lap of the race and therefore, were not classified as finishers.)	LMP2	28	(France) TDS Racing	(France) Loïc Duval (France) François Perrodo (France) Matthieu Vaxivière	Oreca 07	D	108	Not classified
NC	LMP2	28	(France) TDS Racing	(France) Loïc Duval (France) François Perrodo (France) Matthieu Vaxivière	Gibson GK428 4.2L V8	D	108	Not classified
NC	LMP1	17	(Russia) SMP Racing	(Russia) Matevos Isaakyan (Russia) Egor Orudzhev (France) Stéphane Sarrazin	BR Engineering BR1	MI	100	Not classified
NC	LMP1	17	(Russia) SMP Racing	(Russia) Matevos Isaakyan (Russia) Egor Orudzhev (France) Stéphane Sarrazin	AER P60B 2.4L Turbo V6	MI	100	Not classified
DNF	LMP1	4	(Austria) ByKolles Racing Team	(France) Tom Dillmann (United Kingdom) James Rossiter (United Kingdom) Oliver Webb	ENSO CLM P1/01	MI	50	Engine
DNF	LMP1	4	(Austria) ByKolles Racing Team	(France) Tom Dillmann (United Kingdom) James Rossiter (United Kingdom) Oliver Webb	Nismo VRX30A 3.0 L Turbo V6	MI	50	Engine

== Standings after the race ==
2018–2019 LMP World Endurance Drivers' Championship

Pos.	+/–	Driver	Points
1		(Spain) Fernando Alonso (Japan) Kazuki Nakajima (Switzerland) Sébastien Buemi	102
2		(Japan) Kamui Kobayashi (United Kingdom) Mike Conway (Argentina) José María López	97
3		(France) Thomas Laurent (United States) Gustavo Menezes (Switzerland) Mathias Beche	73
4		(Switzerland) Neel Jani (Germany) André Lotterer	63
5	1	(Brazil) Bruno Senna	45

2018–2019 LMP1 World Endurance Championship

Pos.	+/–	Team	Points
1		(Japan) Toyota Gazoo Racing	118
2		(Switzerland) Rebellion Racing	90
3		(Russia) SMP Racing	52
4		(Austria) ByKolles Racing Team	22
5	1	(United States) DragonSpeed	8.5
6	1	(China) CEFC TRSM Racing	1

- Note: Only the top five positions are included for the Drivers' Championship standings.

2018–2019 World Endurance GTE Drivers' Championship

Pos.	+/–	Driver	Points
1		(Denmark) Michael Christensen (France) Kévin Estre	111
2=		(Germany) Stefan Mücke (France) Olivier Pla	68
2=	1	(Italy) Gianmaria Bruni (Austria) Richard Lietz	68
4	1	(United Kingdom) James Calado (Italy) Alessandro Pier Guidi	65.5
5	3	(Denmark) Marco Sørensen (Denmark) Nicki Thiim	55.5

2018–2019 World Endurance GTE Manufacturers' Championship

Pos.	+/–	Constructor	Points
1		(Germany) Porsche	181
2		(United States) Ford	105
3		(Italy) Ferrari	102
4		(United Kingdom) Aston Martin	94
5		(Germany) BMW	56

- Note: Only the top five positions are included for the Drivers' Championship standings.

FIA World Endurance Championship
Previous race: 6 Hours of Fuji	2018–19 season	Next race: 1000 Miles of Sebring
