= 2019 24 Hours of Le Mans =

87th 24 Hours of Le Mans endurance race

Previous: 2018	Next: 2020
Index: Races | Winners

Circuit de la Sarthe track

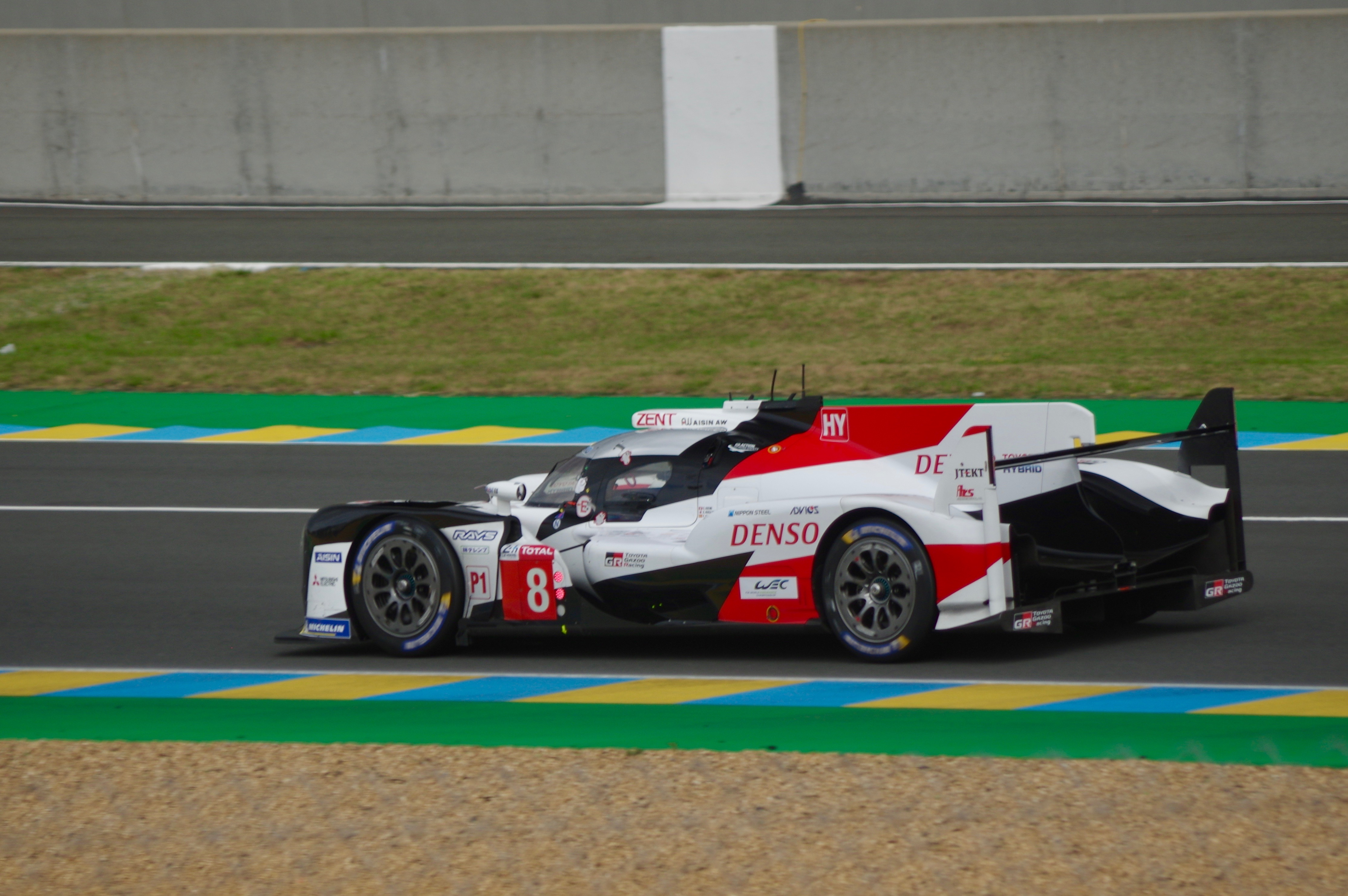
The race-winning No. 8 Toyota TS050 Hybrid

The 87th 24 Hours of Le Mans (French: 87^{e} 24 Heures du Mans) was an 24-hour automobile endurance race for Le Mans Prototype and Le Mans Grand Touring Endurance cars entered by teams of three drivers each held from 15 to 16 June 2019 at the Circuit de la Sarthe, close to Le Mans, France before approximately 252,500 people. It was the 87th running of the event, as organised by the automotive group, the Automobile Club de l'Ouest (ACO) since 1923. The round was the last race in the 2018–19 FIA World Endurance Championship and the second time in the season that the series had visited Le Mans. A test day was held two weeks prior to the race on 2 June.

A Toyota TS050 Hybrid shared by Mike Conway, Kamui Kobayashi and José María López started from pole position after Kobayashi set the overall fastest lap time in the second qualifying session. The race was won by the Toyota trio of Fernando Alonso, Sébastien Buemi and Kazuki Nakajima after López slowed in the 23rd hour due to a wired tyre pressure sensor system, which incorrectly indicated a puncture on a tyre that was later found not to have any issues. It was Alonso, Buemi, Nakajima and Toyota's second consecutive Le Mans win. The No. 7 Toyota finished almost 17 seconds behind in second position. The No. 11 SMP Racing BR1 of Mikhail Aleshin, Vitaly Petrov and Stoffel Vandoorne was the highest-placed non-hybrid LMP1 car in third place.

The Signatech Alpine team of Nicolas Lapierre, André Negrão and Pierre Thiriet won the Le Mans Prototype 2 (LMP2) category with the Jackie Chan DC Racing Oreca 07 car of Ho-Pin Tung, Gabriel Aubry and Stéphane Richelmi second. On the 70th anniversary of Ferrari's first overall Le Mans victory the AF Corse team won the Le Mans Grand Touring Endurance Professional (LMGTE Pro) class with James Calado's, Alessandro Pier Guidi's and Daniel Serra's 488 GTE Evo from a Porsche 911 RSR driven by Richard Lietz, Gianmaria Bruni and Frédéric Makowiecki. The Le Mans Grand Touring Endurance Amateur (LMGTE Am) category was led for most of the time by Keating Motorsports' Ford GT of Jeroen Bleekemolen, Felipe Fraga and Ben Keating which was the first to finish the race. It was later disqualified for an oversized fuel tank and Project 1 Racing's Porsche of Jörg Bergmeister, Patrick Lindsey and Egidio Perfetti inherited the class win.

The result won Alonso, Buemi and Nakajima the LMP Drivers' Championship by 41 points over Conway, Kobayashi and López. Thomas Laurent and Gustavo Menezes of the Rebellion Racing team finished third ahead of Aleshin and Petrov in fourth and the Rebellion duo of Neel Jani and André Lotterer in fifth. Porsche's Michael Christensen and Kévin Estre finished tenth in LMGTE Pro to claim the GTE Drivers' Championship with 155 points. LMGTE Pro class race winners Calado and Pier Guidi passed Bruni and Lietz to end the season in second place.

== Background ==
The dates for the 2019 24 Hours of Le Mans were confirmed at a meeting of the FIA World Motor Sport Council in its headquarters in Geneva, Switzerland on 19 June 2017. It was the 87th Le Mans race, the final automobile endurance event of the 2018–19 FIA World Endurance Championship (FIA WEC), and was the second visit to Le Mans during the season.

After winning the 6 Hours of Spa-Francorchamps, Toyota drivers Fernando Alonso, Sébastien Buemi and Kazuki Nakajima led the LMP Drivers' Championship with 160 points, 31 ahead of their teammates Mike Conway, Kamui Kobayashi and José María López in second. 38 points were available for the final race, which meant Conway, Kobayashi and López could win the LMP Drivers' Championship if they won and Alonso, Buemi and Nakajima finished eighth or lower. With 140 points, Porsche's Michael Christensen and Kévin Estre led the GTE Drivers' Championship by 36 points over their second-placed teammates Gianmaria Bruni and Richard Lietz. Christensen and Estre needed to finish eighth or better to claim the title as Bruni and Lietz needed to win at Le Mans and their teammates to attain a sub-par result. The LMP1 Teams' Championship and the GTE Manufacturers' Championship had already been won by Toyota and Porsche, respectively.

== Regulation changes ==
Following a two-lap victory for Porsche in the Le Mans Grand Touring Professional (LMGTE Pro) category in 2018, the ACO revised Le Mans' safety implementation system after team managers raised procedural concerns. Full course yellow flags mandating cars to slow to 80 km/h (50 mph) in the event of an accident were implemented for the first time at Le Mans. The system became the preferred method of slowing the race as opposed to deploying three safety cars and enforcing slow zones. The ACO also permitted drivers to enter the pit lane during safety car conditions and exit it before a second safety car passed by so that they could remain in the same group of vehicles when racing resumed.

== Entries ==
The ACO Selection Committee received 75 applications for entries between the LMP1 (Le Mans Prototype 1), LMP2 (Le Mans Prototype 2), LMGTE Pro and LMGTE Am (Le Mans Grand Touring Amateur) categories from 20 December 2018 to 30 January 2019. The automotive group initially planned to accept 60 cars into the race but wishing to not exclude applications of a "high standard" they allowed 62 to race. The ten-panel Selection Committee took steps to ensure that the two additional required pits would be operational in time for the 2019 edition.

=== Automatic entries ===
Automatic entry invitations were earned by teams that won their class in the 2018 24 Hours of Le Mans. Teams who won championships in the European Le Mans Series (ELMS), Asian Le Mans Series (ALMS), and the Michelin Le Mans Cup (MLMC) were also invited. The second-place finisher in the 2018 ELMS LMGTE championship also earned an automatic invitation. The ACO chose two IMSA SportsCar Championship (IMSA) teams to be automatic entries regardless of their performance or category. As invitations were granted to teams, they were allowed to change their cars from the previous year to the next, but not their category. The LMGTE class invitations from the ELMS and ALMS were allowed to choose between the Pro and Am categories. ELMS' 2018 LMP3 (Le Mans Prototype 3) champion was required to field an entry in LMP2 while the 2018–19 ALMS LMP3 champion was permitted to choose between LMP2 or LMGTE Am. The 2018 MLMC GT3 champion was limited to the LMGTE Am category.

On 11 February 2019, the ACO announced the initial list of automatic entries. Driver Misha Goikhberg, who was invited to the race by winning the Jim Trueman Award for being "the top-placed gentleman driver" in IMSA's Daytona Prototype International category, transferred his automatic entry to WeatherTech Racing per an agreement.

Automatic entries for the 2019 24 Hours of Le Mans
Reason invited	LMP1	LMP2	LMGTE Pro	LMGTE Am
1st in the 24 Hours of Le Mans	(Japan) Toyota Gazoo Racing	(France) Signatech Alpine Matmut	(Germany) Porsche GT Team	(Germany) Dempsey-Proton Racing
1st in the European Le Mans Series (LMP2 and LMGTE)		(Russia) G-Drive Racing	(Germany) Proton Competition	
2nd in the European Le Mans Series (LMGTE)			(United Kingdom) JMW Motorsport	
1st in the European Le Mans Series (LMP3)		(United Kingdom) RLR MSport		
IMSA SportsCar Championship at-large entries		(Canada) Misha Goikhberg (Note: Mikhail Goikhberg's automatic entry was transferred to WeatherTech Racing per an agreement.)		(United States) Ben Keating
1st in the Asian Le Mans Series (LMP2 and GT)		(United States) United Autosports	(Japan) CarGuy Racing	
1st in the Asian Le Mans Series (LMP2 Am)		(Slovakia) ARC Bratislava		
1st in the Asian Le Mans Series (LMP3)		(Poland) Inter Europol Competition	– or –	(Poland) Inter Europol Competition
1st in the Michelin Le Mans Cup (GT3)				(Switzerland) Kessel Racing

=== Entry list and reserves ===
For the 2019 event, the list of race entries was revealed in two stages: the first 42 cars were announced on 11 February with the rest of the field and 10 reserve cars in the LMP2 class and the two LMGTE categories announced on 1 March. The ACO attributed the 2018–19 FIA WEC's format as a reason for the alteration. In addition from the 34 guaranteed entries from the FIA WEC, 15 came from the ELMS, nine from IMSA, five from the ALMS and a solitary one-off Le Mans specific entry.

In addition to the 62 entries given invitations for the race, 10 were put on a reserve list to replace any withdrawn or ungranted invitations. Reserve entries were ordered with the first replacing the first withdrawal from the race, regardless of the class and entry. The Spirit of Race team announced the withdrawal of their Ferrari 488 GTE Evo on 21 March, citing "an unavoidable family commitment" as the reason. Duqueine Engineering's Oreca 07-Gibson car was promoted to the race entry as a result. That same day, Michael Shank Racing withdrew its Algarve Pro Racing-run Oreca 07 car from the reserve list because the team was ninth in that list.

On 16 April, on the day that the ACO announced that two additional temporary pit garages would be constructed to raise the number of cars for the event to 62, the No. 32 United Autosports Ligier JS P217-Gibson and High Class Racing's No. 20 Oreca 07 were the two cars promoted from the reserve list to the race entry. With the subsequent withdrawal of the Ebimotors LMGTE Am car from the reserve entries, five reserves remained on the list: the Eurasia Motorsport, Panis-Barthez Compétition, IDEC Sport, Team Project 1 and TF Sport teams.

== Pre-race balance of performance changes ==
The FIA Endurance Committee altered the LMP equivalence of technology and the LMGTE balance of performance to try to create parity within each category. All non-hybrid LMP1 cars had their maximum fuel flow increased from 108 kg/h (240 lb/h) to 115 kg/h (250 lb/h) with the Toyota TS050 Hybrid's unchanged at 80 kg/h (180 lb/h). The Toyota's minimum weight was set at 888 kg (1,958 lb), the turbocharged non-hybrid LMP1 vehicles at 833 kg (1,836 lb) and the non-turbocharged privateer LMP1 cars at 816 kg (1,799 lb).

For the LMGTE Pro class, the Porsche 911 RSR and BMW M8 GTE had respective ballast increases of 2 kg (4.4 lb) and 9 kg (20 lb) and less turbocharger boost curve for lower performance. The Ford GT's weight was increased by 12 kg (26 lb) and its turbocharger boost curve altered to raise its top speed. Conversely, the Aston Martin Vantage, the Chevrolet Corvette C7.R, and the Ferrari 488 Evo had 7 kg (15 lb) of ballast removed and the Ferrari's turbocharger boost curve was made more powerful. In LMGTE Am, the Ford was made 13 kg (29 lb) heavier than the Ferrari 488 GTE. The 2017-specification Aston Martin Vantage had 4 kg (8.8 lb) of weight deducted while Porsche had no performance changes.

== Testing ==
A test day held on 2 June required all race entrants to participate in eight hours of driving divided into two sessions. Toyota led the morning session with a lap of 3:21.875 from Buemi. His teammate López was second and led until Buemi's lap. Gustavo Menezes' No. 3 Rebellion R13 car followed in third, with Vitaly Petrov and Stéphane Sarrazin's SMP Racing BR1 cars fourth and fifth. Filipe Albuquerque's No. 22 United Autosports Ligier car led in LMP2 with a 3:32.245 lap, ahead of Pastor Maldonado's No. 31 DragonSpeed, the Graff of Tristan Gommendy and Nyck de Vries' Racing Team Nederland Dallara P217 cars. Billy Johnson's No. 66 Ford led LMGTE Pro for most of the session until Antonio García's No. 63 Corvette overtook him. Francesco Castellacci's Spirit of Race Ferrari was the fastest car in LMGTE Am from Jeff Segal's JMW Motorsport Ferrari. Mechanical issues on Jordan King's No. 37 Jackie Chan DC Racing Oreca and Marco Sørensen's No. 95 Aston Martin and Paul-Loup Chatin's crash into a tyre barrier at Indianapolis corner disrupted the session.

Buemi was fastest early in the second session with a lap of 3:20.068, which he later improved to a 3:19.440 to lead all entries. Conway improved the No. 7 Toyota's best lap for second. The fastest non-hybrid LMP1 entry was André Lotterer's No. 1 Rebellion in third, followed by Stoffel Vandoorne's No. 11 SMP BR1 and Nathanaël Berthon's No. 3 Rebellion cars. With a time of 3:28.504, Ho-Pin Tung improved the fastest time in LMP2, moving Jackie Chan past Maldonado and Nicolas Lapierre's No. 36 Signatech Alpine car. The No. 63 Corvette continued to lead in LMGTE Pro with a 3:54.001 lap from Mike Rockenfeller, three-hundredths of a second faster than Harry Tincknell's No. 66 Ford and Tommy Milner's No. 64 Corvette. Toni Vilander's No. 62 WeatherTech Ferrari was fastest in LMGTE Am.

=== Post-testing balance of performance changes ===
Following testing, the ACO again altered the LMP1 equivalence of technology. All normally aspirated cars had a maximum fuel level per stint of 50.8 kg (112 lb) and a limit of 48.4 kg (107 lb) for turbocharged cars. Toyota had a one-lap per stint advantage of fuel load from the 2018 race reinstated with pit stop fuel flow rate changes. The FIA changed the balance of performance to dictate all LMGTE vehicles have a fuel tank 1 L (0.22 imp gal; 0.26 US gal) larger than in testing.

== Practice ==
A single, four-hour free practice session on 13 June was available to the teams and saw variable weather throughout as several cars spun. Vandoorne led from the final half-hour before Kobayashi went fastest with a lap of 3:18.091 with less than two minutes left of practice. The Rebellion team was third with a lap from Menezes, Alonso was fourth and Bruno Senna's No. 1 car fifth. Four Oreca vehicles led in LMP2, with Chatin's IDEC entry ahead of Maldonado's No. 31 DragonSpeed and Jean-Éric Vergne's No. 26 G-Drive cars. Two Porsches led in LMGTE Pro; Christensen's No. 92 911 RSR was fastest with a lap of 3:52.149. Mathieu Jaminet's No. 94 car was second and the fastest Ferrari was Sam Bird's third-placed No. 71 AF Corse car. Matt Campbell of the Dempsey-Proton team helped Porsche to be fastest in LMGTE Am ahead of Giancarlo Fisichella's Spirit of Race Ferrari and Pedro Lamy's No. 98 Aston Martin.

Satoshi Hoshino slid through a gravel trap in the Porsche Curves and crashed the No. 88 Dempsey-Proton car against a barrier, which necessitated a full course yellow flag to recover it to the pit lane. Tracy Krohn had an accident in the sister No. 99 car on the Mulsanne Straight and stopped the session for ¾ of an hour to clear debris and repair a barrier. Krohn was transported to The Centre Hospitalier Du Mans for observation and FIA medical personnel advised him to desist from racing for one week. The No. 99 Dempsey-Proton Porsche was later withdrawn because the team did not wish to elevate the car to the LMGTE Pro class with Krohn's co-drivers Patrick Long and Niclas Jönsson as a duo.

== Qualifying ==
The first of three qualifying sessions to set the race's starting order with the quickest lap times set by each team's fastest driver began late on Wednesday night under clear conditions and on a dry track. Toyota again led early on with a 3:17.161 lap from Kobayashi. The fastest two non-hybrid LMP1 vehicles were Egor Orudzhev's No. 17 SMP and Thomas Laurent's No. 3 Rebellion car in second and third. Alonso's No. 8 Toyota and Ben Hanley's No. 10 DragonSpeed car were fourth and fifth. Maldonado took provisional pole position for the DragonSpeed team in LMP2 with a 3:26.804 lap. Lapierre and Albuquerque were second and third in class. With 46 minutes to go, Roberto González spun the DragonSpeed car at the entry to the Ford Chicane. As he restarted the car to return to the pit lane, he and the left-hand side of Conway's unsighted Toyota collided, sending Conway airborne and over González's front bodywork. Both drivers were unhurt as debris littered the track. Repairs to the Toyota in the garage took 20 minutes to complete as the car was built around a new monocoque.

Tincknell's No. 66 Ford led LMGTE Pro with a 3:49.530 time after a faster lap from García's No. 64 Corvette was disallowed because he improved it under yellow flag conditions. Nick Tandy's No. 93 Porsche was 0.028 seconds slower in second and Alex Lynn's No. 97 Aston Martin was third. The No. 66 Ford had an earlier excursion when driver Olivier Pla spun into the gravel trap at the exit to the Porsche Curves and hit a tyre barrier. Recovery vehicles extricated the car and Pla drove slowly to the pit lane. Porsches took the first three places in LMGTE Am, with Matteo Cairoli's No. 77 Dempsey-Proton vehicle fastest from Jörg Bergmeister's No. 56 Project 1 and Julien Andlauer's sister Dempsey-Proton cars. After the session, the No. 7 Toyota's monocoque was replaced due to a deep crack discovered during an inspection; Conway and González shared responsibility for the crash and the former incurred a suspended three-minute stop-and-go penalty.

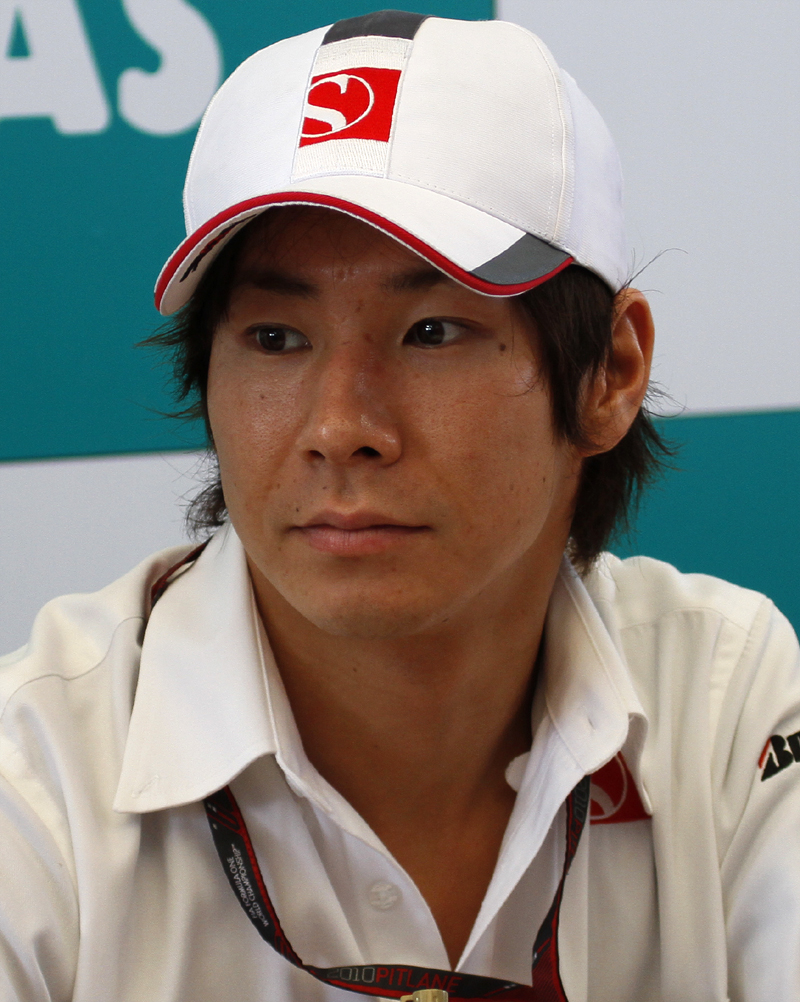
Kamui Kobayashi (pictured in 2010) took overall pole position in the No. 7 Toyota TS050 Hybrid.

Thursday's first qualifying session saw faster lap times in every class. Kobayashi improved provisional pole position to a 3:15.497 lap and his teammate Nakajima moved to second. Mikhail Aleshin moved the No. 11 SMP car to third and Neel Jani set a lap that put the No. 1 Rebellion car fourth after its best time from the first session was deleted due to an incorrect fuel flow meter. Sarrazin could not improve and SMP's No. 17 car fell to fifth. Early in the session, Laurent's engine failed on the Mulsanne Straight and laid a large amount of oil on the track. The session was stopped for 20 minutes for track marshals to extricate the No. 3 Rebellion car from the side of the exit to Mulsanne corner and dry the oil. Maldonado improved his best lap to 3:26.490 to keep the DragonSpeed team ahead in LMP2. Jackie Chan's No. 38 car of Stéphane Richelmi went faster to go second and Lapierre fell to third after his electrical system was repaired. In LMGTE Pro, Christensen's lap of 3:49.388 in the final ten minutes moved the No. 92 Porsche to the class lead. García moved the No. 63 Corvette to second as Ticknell fell to third. Cairoli and Bergmeister retained the first two positions in LMGTE Am as Fisichella moved the Spirit of Racing team to third place.

As temperatures cooled in the final session, over half of the field improved their fastest laps, but Kobayashi's pole position lap went unchallenged. It was Toyota's third pole in a row at Le Mans since the 2017 race; Conway and Kobayashi's second and López's first. Orudzhev led the session with a 3:16.159 lap for third after Toyota was unable to get a clean lap when night began to fall. Menezes took fourth and Vandoorne fifth after being baulked by traffic in the Porsche Curves and an error at the Ford Chicane. Senna's engine failed and he stopped at Arnage corner after an hour. In LMP2, Oreca cars took the first six positions as Gommendy gave the Graff team pole position with a 3:25.073 lap. Loïc Duval was 0.282 seconds slower in second as Maldonado fell to third. Porsche, and later Ford, led in LMGTE Pro before Sørensen earned the 2018 Aston Martin Vantage its second class pole with a 3:48 lap. Tincknell and García were second and third in class, respectively. Cairoli improved the No. 88 Dempsey-Proton Porsche's provisional pole lap in LMGTE Am to a 3:51.439 ahead of his teammate Campbell. Thomas Preining moved the No. 86 Gulf car to third in class. Lamy's No. 98 Aston Martin's got beached in a Mulsanne Straight chicane gravel trap and stopped the session for 25 minutes as it was extricated.

=== Post-qualifying ===
Following qualifying, the stewards deleted all of the Graff team's fastest lap times from the third session after driver Vincent Capillaire failed to stop at the scrutineering stand at the entry to the pit lane for a weight check. The team incurred a €1000 fine and fell from pole position to 14th in LMP2, elevating the IDEC squad to the class pole and the Signatech team to second place.

The ACO altered the balance of performance in both of the LMGTE categories. The Aston Martin's turbocharger boost was reduced and its fuel capacity lowered by 2 L (0.44 imp gal; 0.53 US gal) to reduce its performance. Every car bar the Chevrolet Corvette received a weight decrease of 5 kg (11 lb). In LMGTE Am Porsche had 10 kg (22 lb) of ballast added to their cars and the same amount removed from the Fords. The Ferrari and Aston Martin LMGTE Am cars had no performance changes.

=== Qualifying results ===
Pole positions in each class are denoted in bold. The fastest time set by each entry is denoted with a gray background.

Final qualifying classification
Pos.	Class	No.	Team	Qualifying 1	Qualifying 2	Qualifying 3	Gap	Grid
1	**LMP1**	**7**	**Toyota Gazoo Racing**	**3:17.161**	**3:15.497**	3:20.494		1
2	LMP1	8	Toyota Gazoo Racing	3:19.632	3:15.908	3:20.669	+0.411	2
3	LMP1	17	SMP Racing	3:17.633	3:17.437	**3:16.159**	+0.662	3
4	LMP1	3	Rebellion Racing	3:19.603	3:18.884	3:16.404	+0.907	4
5	LMP1	11	SMP Racing	3:20.934	3:16.953	3:16.665	+1.168	5
6	LMP1	1	Rebellion Racing	No time (Note: The No. 1 Rebellion had all Q1 lap times deleted for running the incorrect fuel flow meter.)	3:17.313	3:16.810	+1.313	6
7	LMP1	10	DragonSpeed	3:20.200	3:23.672	3:25.902	+4.703	7
8	LMP1	4	ByKolles Racing Team	3:25.246	3:23.726	3:23.109	+7.612	8
9	**LMP2**	**28**	**TDS Racing**	3:28.840	3:27.096	**3:25.345**	**+9.848**	9
10	LMP2	31	DragonSpeed	**3:26.804**	**3:26.490**	3:25.667	+10.170	10
11	LMP2	36	Signatech Alpine Matmut	3:26.935	3:28.471	3:25.874	+10.377	11
12	LMP2	48	IDEC Sport	3:27.847	3:27.804	3:26.011	+10.514	12
13	LMP2	26	G-Drive Racing	3:29.107	3:28.713	3:26.257	+10.760	13
14	LMP2	22	United Autosports	3:27.338	3:27.356	3:26.543	+11.046	14
15	LMP2	38	Jackie Chan DC Racing	3:28.738	3:27.821	3:27.779	+11.324	15
16	LMP2	29	Racing Team Nederland	3:28.909	3:27.107	3:27.384	+11.610	16
17	LMP2	32	United Autosports	3:29.583	3:28.779	3:27.509	+12.012	17
18	LMP2	20	High Class Racing	3:32.945	3:29.633	3:27.610	+12.113	18
19	LMP2	23	Panis Barthez Competition	3:29.821	3:27.790	3:32.511	+12.293	19
20	LMP2	37	Jackie Chan DC Racing	3:29.498	3:28.569	3:28.049	+12.552	20
21	LMP2	30	Duqueine Engineering	3:28.653	3:30.353	3:28.195	+12.698	21
22	LMP2	39	Graff	3:30.970	3:28.426	No time (Note: The No. 39 Graff Oreca had all Q3 lap times deleted for failing to stop at the scrutineering stand at pit lane entry for weight check.)	+12.929	22
23	LMP2	25	Algarve Pro Racing	3:29.126	3:28.457	3:31.113	+12.960	23
24	LMP2	43	RLR MSport/Tower Events	3:31.017	3:29.137	3:28.803	+13.306	24
25	LMP2	47	Cetilar Racing Villorba Corse	3:29.748	3:28.942	3:29.556	+13.445	25
26	LMP2	34	Inter Europol Competition	3:30.744	3:30.823	3:31.491	+15.247	26
27	LMP2	49	ARC Bratislava	3:35.480	3:44.799	3:34.146	+18.649	27
28	LMP2	50	Larbre Compétition	3:38.663	3:36.144	3:34.913	+19.416	28
29	**LMGTE Pro**	**95**	**Aston Martin Racing**	3:50.812	3:51.948	**3:48.000**	**+32.503**	29
30	LMGTE Pro	67	Ford Chip Ganassi Racing UK	**3:49.530**	3:52.831	3:48.112	+32.615	30
31	LMGTE Pro	63	Corvette Racing	3:52.109	3:49.424	3:48.830	+33.333	31
32	LMGTE Pro	93	Porsche GT Team	3:49.558	3:50.171	3:48.907	+33.410	32
33	LMGTE Pro	82	BMW Team MTEK	3:53.498	3:51.818	3:49.108	+33.611	33
34	LMGTE Pro	68	Ford Chip Ganassi Team USA	3:53.053	3:50.486	3:49.116	+33.619	34
35	LMGTE Pro	92	Porsche GT Team	3:50.468	**3:49.388**	3:49.196	+33.699	35
36	LMGTE Pro	71	AF Corse	3:50.850	3:50.623	3:49.391	+33.894	36
37	LMGTE Pro	66	Ford Chip Ganassi Team UK	3:53.793	3:51.601	3:49.511	+34.014	37
38	LMGTE Pro	69	Ford Chip Ganassi Team USA	3:51.821	3:50.339	3:49.546	+34.049	38
39	LMGTE Pro	64	Corvette Racing	3:52.490	3:51.011	3:49.573	+34.076	39
40	LMGTE Pro	51	AF Corse	3:52.128	3:51.019	3:49.655	+34.158	40
41	LMGTE Pro	91	Porsche GT Team	3:50.099	3:49.921	3:51.039	+34.424	41
42	LMGTE Pro	97	Aston Martin Racing	3:50.037	3:52.283	3:50.383	+34.540	42
43	LMGTE Pro	94	Porsche GT Team	3:50.278	3:50.810	3:50.593	+34.781	43
44	LMGTE Pro	81	BMW Team MTEK	3:51,476	3:51.353	No time	+35.856	44
45	**LMGTE Am**	**88**	**Dempsey-Proton Racing**	**3:52.454**	3:54.107	**3:51.439**	**+35.942**	45
46	LMGTE Pro	89	Risi Competizione	3:52.997	3:53.244	3:51.454	+35.957	46
47	LMGTE Am	77	Dempsey-Proton Racing	3:53.408	3:54.008	3:51.645	+36.148	47
48	LMGTE Am	86	Gulf Racing	3:55.033	3:53.571	3:51.944	+36.447	48
49	LMGTE Am	84	JMW Motorsport	3:54.513	3:56.154	3:52.423	+36.926	49
50	LMGTE Am	78	Proton Competition	3:54.324	3:54.942	3:52.434	+36.937	50
51	LMGTE Am	56	Team Project 1	3:52.750	3:55.011	3:53.135	+37.253	51
52	LMGTE Am	54	Spirit of Race	3:53.793	**3:52.826**	3:52.879	+37.329	52
53	LMGTE Am	57	Car Guy Racing	3:56.034	3:53.474	3:54.928	+37.977	53
54	LMGTE Am	85	Keating Motorsports	3:56.579	3:53.492	3:54.815	+37.995	54
55	LMGTE Am	60	Kessel Racing	3:56.147	3:53.990	3:53.528	+38.021	55
56	LMGTE Am	98	Aston Martin Racing	3:53.530	3:56.136	3:53.698	+38.033	56
57	LMGTE Am	90	TF Sport	3:53.974	3:54.542	3:53.606	+38.109	57
58	LMGTE Am	62	WeatherTech Racing	3:55.544	3:54.350	3:53.630	+38.133	58
59	LMGTE Am	70	MR Racing	3:54.737	3:55.906	3:54.051	+38.554	59
60	LMGTE Am	83	Kessel Racing	3:56.333	3:54.363	3:54.083	+38.586	60
61	LMGTE Am	61	Clearwater Racing	3:56.072	3:56.120	3:54.240	+38.743	61

== Warm-up ==
A 45-minute warm-up session on Saturday morning took place in dry and sunny weather. Kobayashi set the fastest lap late on at 3:19.647 with his teammate Buemi in second. Laurent's No. 3 Rebellion was the fastest non-hybrid LMP1 car in third. SMP's two cars of Petrov and Sarrazin were fourth and fifth. Vergne recorded the fastest LMP2 lap at 3:28.763, which was 1.4 seconds faster than Duval. Estre's No. 92 Porsche was the quickest car in LMGTE Pro while Ben Barker helped the marque to be fastest in LMGTE Am. While the session passed without a major incident, a brief full course yellow flag procedure was used to clear debris on the circuit.

== Race ==
=== Start and opening hours ===
The weather was dry and sunny before the race; the air temperature was between 14.5 to 21.2 °C (58.1 to 70.2 °F) and the track temperature 18.8 to 25.5 °C (65.8 to 77.9 °F). Approximately 252,500 spectators attended the event. The French tricolour was waved at 15:00 Central European Summer Time (UTC+02:00) by Charlene, Princess of Monaco to start the race, led by the starting pole sitter Conway. Menezes overtook Buemi and Petrov to move into second place on the first lap and held it until Buemi demoted him to third soon after. Conway reset the race track lap record on the fourth lap with a 3:17.297 time to lead his teammate Buemi by 15.5 seconds. At the close of the hour, García, in Corvette's No. 63 car, took the lead of LMGTE Pro from Nicki Thiim's No. 95 Aston Martin on the inside before Indianapolis corner, as Lapierre and Fisichella moved to the front of LMP2 and LMGTE Am on pit stop rotation respectively. Senna's No. 1 Rebellion was forced to drive slowly to the pit lane to replace a puncture and the car fell down the race order.

In the second hour, Conway continued to pull away from his teammate Buemi. Vergne ran in clear air to be less than a second behind Lapierre's LMP2 leading No. 36 Signatech car. Spirit of Race's No. 54 Ferrari, now driven by Thomas Flohr in lieu of Fisichella, relinquished its lead of LMGTE Am to Andlauer's No. 77 Dempsey-Proton Porsche and was behind Jeroen Bleekemolen's No. 85 Keating Ford after a second sequence of pit stops. A full course yellow flag was activated 3 hours, 42 minutes in after the left-front tyre was punctured on de Vries' Racing Team Nederland Dallara car. This moved González's No. 31 DragonSpeed vehicle to third in LMP2 which he later lost to King's No. 37 Jackie Chan car at Mulsanne Corner. Job van Uitert's G-Drive entry, which had taken the lead of LMP2 from Lapierre's Signatech car, incurred a ten-second stop-and-go penalty taken at its next pit stop because his co-driver Vergne was observed speeding during the full course yellow flag. Van Uitert recovered the lost time he had lost in the pit lane and retook the lead from the Signatech car, now driven by Pierre Thiriet, into the first Mulsanne Straight chicane.

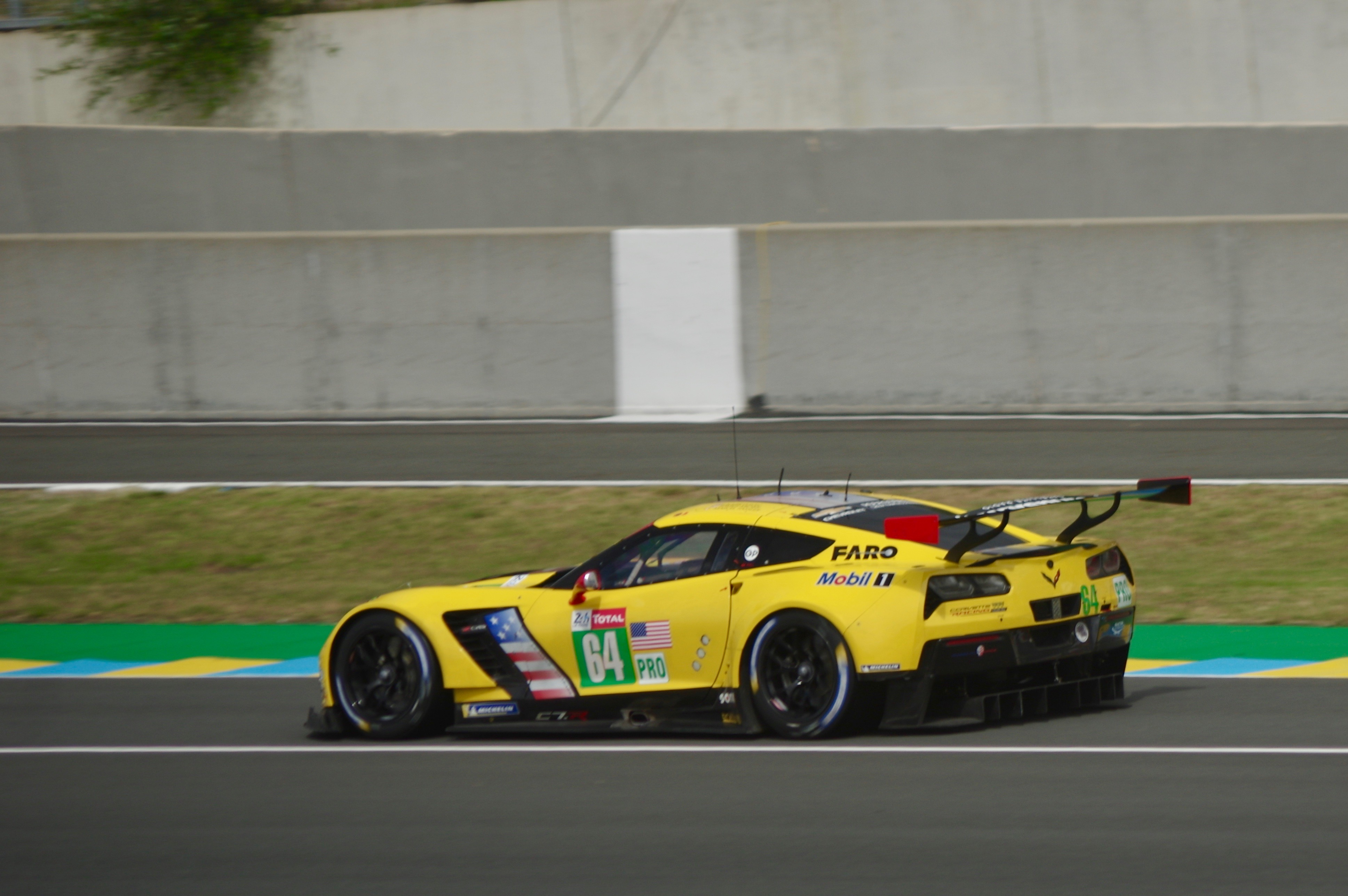
The No. 64 Chevrolet Corvette C7.R retired after contact with the No. 88 Dempsey-Proton Porsche 911 RSR

The LMGTE Pro class lead became a multi-car battle between representatives of four of the five manufacturers, with the first five positions separated by less than ten seconds. During the fifth hour, Berthon's No. 3 car fell behind the SMP duo of Aleshin and Sergey Sirotkin because of a two-minute pit stop. Further down the field, Daniel Serra's No. 51 AF Corse Ferrari passed Rockenfeller's LMGTE Pro class-leading No. 63 Corvette. Porsche sought to conserve tyre wear and fuel usage rather than challenge for the lead in LMGTE Pro, promoting Laurens Vanthoor's No. 92 Porsche to the class lead from Serra on pit stop strategy. Felipe Fraga's No. 85 Keating car overtook Christian Ried's No. 77 Dempsey-Proton Porsche to lead LMGTE Am. Not long after, John Farano crashed the No. 43 RLR MSport car at Tetre Rouge corner and the safety cars were deployed to slow the race. When racing resumed, André Negrão's Signatech car overtook Roman Rusinov's G-Drive car into the second Mulsanne Straight chicane for the LMP2 lead.

Serra duelled Vanthoor and retook the lead of LMGTE Pro into Indianapolis corner. Earl Bamber moved the No. 93 Porsche past Rockenfeller for third in class. Shortly after, the right-rear corner of Marcel Fässler's No. 64 Corvette and the left-front corner of Satoshi Hoshino's No. 88 Dempsey-Proton Porsche made contact in slower traffic in the Porsche Curves. Fässler veered into an outside concrete barrier and his car was retired due to heavy damage. Hoshino brought his car into the garage for repairs to its front but it was later retired for safety reasons. Fässler sustained minor bruising and FIA personnel performed a precautionary CT scan on him at the circuit's medical centre. The safety cars were required once again as track marshals worked for 16 minutes to clear debris. As the safety cars were recalled, the gap to López and Nakajima had fallen to ten seconds and Bleekemolen had extended the lead over Jeff Segal's No. 84 JMW Ferrari in LMGTE Am to three minutes.

=== Sunset to night ===
At the start of the seventh hour, Laurent's No. 3 Rebellion overtook Aleshin's No. 11 SMP car on the outside in the Porsche Curves for third. Light rain began to fall soon after, catching out Laurent who spun after braking for the second Mulsanne Straight chicane and veered right into a barrier. The impact removed the front bodywork from the No. 3 Rebellion and a small chunk landed on the No. 11 SMP vehicle. The accident led to a third safety car intervention to clear debris, during which repairs to the No. 3 Rebellion car took 3 minutes, 38 seconds, later rejoining in fifth position, behind the SMP entries. After racing resumed, López used slower traffic through the second Mulsanne Straight chicane to pass his teammate Nakajima for the overall lead. The lead of LMGTE Pro changed to Estre's No. 92 Porsche from Alessandro Pier Guidi's No. 51 AF Corse Ferrari after a sequence of pit stops. In LMP2, Vergne used his newer tyres to reclaim the lead of the class from Negrão into Indianapolis corner. López was forced to relinquish the overall lead to Nakajima in the eighth hour when he ran wide into the Mulsanne corner gravel trap. García's No. 63 Corvette took second place in LMGTE Pro with successive passes on Tincknell's No. 67 Ford and Per Guidi's No. 51 Ferrari on the outside at Indianapolis corner.

Conway's No. 7 Toyota retook the race lead from Buemi's No. 8 after pit stops. James Calado moved the No. 51 AF Corse Ferrari past Christensen's No. 92 Porsche for the LMGTE Pro lead during the ninth hour. Wei Lu lost control of the No. 84 JMW Ferrari at the second Mulsanne Straight chicane but continued without losing second position in LMGTE Am. During hour ten, Lynn damaged the No. 97 Aston Martin's spoiler in the Porsche Curves and a local slow zone was employed to check for damage to the barriers. Lynn returned to the pit lane and the car rejoined the race after half an hour of repairs. Not long after, Sørensen's No. 95 Aston Martin spun across a gravel trap and sustained heavy rear-end damage in an impact against the barrier at Indianapolis turn. Safety cars were required for the fourth time and caused the lead of multiple classes to grow. Conway increased his lead over Buemi to more than a minute and Van Uitert's G-Drive car was 1 minute, 21 seconds ahead of Thiriet's Signatech entry. The safety cars separated the LMGTE Pro field, leaving the No. 51 Ferrari and the No. 92 Porsche one minute ahead of the No. 93 Porsche, which passed the No. 63 Corvette for third in class.

Orudzhev's third-placed SMP BR1 lost control on the exit to the Porsche Curves and crashed rearward into an outside tyre barrier at high speed. He was unhurt; the accident necessitated the car's retirement and a fifth safety car period. During the slow period, Conway relinquished the lead to his teammate Buemi because he made a pit stop and was required to stop at the exit of the pit lane until the nearest safety car passed by. After the safety cars were withdrawn, Berthon's No. 3 Rebellion vehicle took third overall, while the lead of LMGTE Pro switched from Serra's No. 51 AF Corse Ferrari to Vanthoor's No. 92 Porsche. As the race approached its halfway point, Kobayashi relieved Conway in the No. 7 Toyota and a faster pit stop than Buemi returned him to the overall lead. Henning Enqvist went wide at Indianapolis corner and crashed the No. 49 ARC Bratislava Ligier car against a tyre barrier. The car was extricated from a gravel trap by a crane before he crashed for a second time, against an outside barrier entering the Porsche Curves. The damage to the car's front-right bodywork forced its retirement and the sixth deployment of the safety cars until the close of the 12th hour.

When racing resumed, the two Toyota cars were less than two seconds from each other and Estre's lead over Serra in LMGTE Pro fell to 2.2 seconds. The No. 92 Porsche subsequently entered the garage for repairs to a defective exhaust system and a change of brakes. Repairs took 20 minutes to complete and Estre resumed in ninth position in LMGTE Pro. Serra's No. 51 Ferrari retook the lead of LMGTE Pro 90 seconds ahead of the No. 93 and No. 91 Porsches of Tandy and Bruni. The No. 4 ByKolles CLM P1/01 car of Tom Dillmann stopped after Arnage corner with a broken gear selection mechanism that necessitated its retirement, requiring a slow zone extending to the exit of the Porsche Curves as the car was extricated by recovery vehicles to behind a trackside wall. Kobayashi increased the No. 7 Toyota's lead over Alonso to more than a minute due to minor underbody damage to the No. 8 car. The two lead Porsche cars in LMGTE Pro drew to near half a minute behind Pier Guidi's Ferrari.

=== Morning to early afternoon ===
In the early morning, some LMGTE cars took the opportunity to change brake discs to ensure that they completed the race. Michael Wainwright crashed the No. 86 Gulf Porsche against a wall at Indianapolis corner and Sergio Pianezzola's No. 60 Kessel Racing Ferrari got beached in a gravel trap in the Porsche Curves at the same time. Both incidents promoted the activation of a full course yellow flag procedure. Recovery by track marshals allowed both cars to return to the race. Kobayashi and later López extended the lead over their teammates Alonso and then Buemi to 1 minute and 20 seconds. Calado's LMGTE Pro leading No. 51 car made a scheduled pit stop and ceded the class lead to Lietz's No. 91 Porsche as Serra relieved him. Not long after, Maldonado lost control of DragonSpeed's No. 31 car leaving Tetre Rouge corner and hit the tyre barrier frontward. Maldonado was unhurt but the damage to the car necessitated its retirement. The safety cars were deployed for more than half an hour. Serra was able to retake the lead of LMGTE Pro with a one-minute lead because the three cars ahead of him made pit stops and were required to stop at the exit of the pit lane.

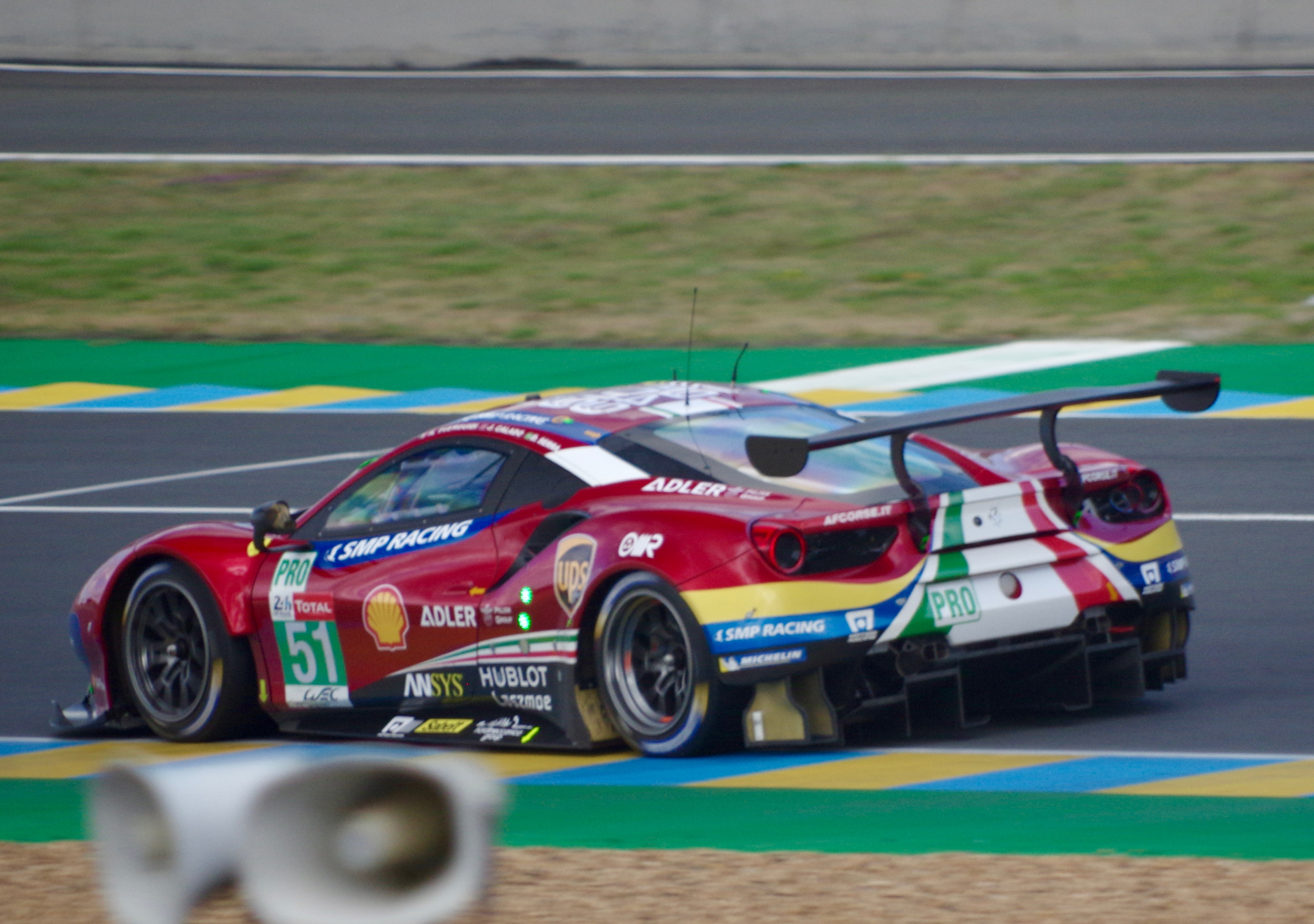
The No. 51 AF Corse Ferrari 488 GTE Evo won in LMGTE Pro on the 70th anniversary of Ferrari's first outright Le Mans win

After the safety cars were withdrawn, Ben Keating's Ford ran into a gravel trap at the first Mulsanne Straight chicane, from which he escaped without damage to the car and retained the lead of LMGTE Am. Menezes' No. 3 Rebellion car incurred a three-minute stop-and-go penalty for a procedural error on the team's usage of tyre compounds, promoting Vandoorne's No. 11 SMP car to third overall. Just after Menezes rejoined the race, he spun into a gravel trap in the Porsche Curves and returned to the garage after vehicular assistance and returned later to replace a brake bleed pipe. 17 hours and 25 minutes in, Tung's No. 38 Jackie Chan car slowed with a puncture and returned to the pit lane to retain third position in LMP2 from François Perrodo's No. 28 TDS car. The G-Drive team continued to lead in LMP2 until Rusinov relinquished the position it had held for 171 consecutive laps to the Signatech car, when he could not start the car due to a starter motor problem that required the removal of the rear bodywork covering its engine. The team lost 20 minutes in the garage and four laps to fall to seventh in class and out of contention for the LMP2 category win.

Two lengthy pit stops to rectify braking issues on Berthon's No. 3 Rebellion car dropped him to sixth and elevated the LMP2 leading Signatech car of Lapierre to fifth overall. In LMGTE Pro, diverging strategies for AF Corse's No. 51 Ferrari and the No. 63 Corvette created a difference of around five laps between both cars and changed the category lead several times. De Vries' Racing Team Nederland Dallara car had a straightline crash against a barrier on the entry to Indianapolis corner due to a possible broken right-front suspension arm, triggering the medical light. It damaged the car's front bodywork and de Vries required repairs in the garage. The safety cars were deployed for the eighth time as track marshals took 25 minutes to clear debris. In LMGTE Pro, the safety cars had again separated the field, leaving Calado's No. 51 Ferrari three minutes ahead of Jan Magnussen's No. 63 Corvette after the latter made a pit stop and had to stop at the exit to the pit lane. After the safety cars were recalled, Magnussen spun and damaged the left-front corner of his car in the Porsche Curves. Repairs in the garage lasted six minutes, lost Magnussen five laps and he returned to the circuit eighth in LMGTE Pro. The crash elevated the No. 91 and No. 93 Porsche cars of Lietz and Tandy to second and third in class and provided Calado with a 1 1/2 minute lead.

=== Finish ===
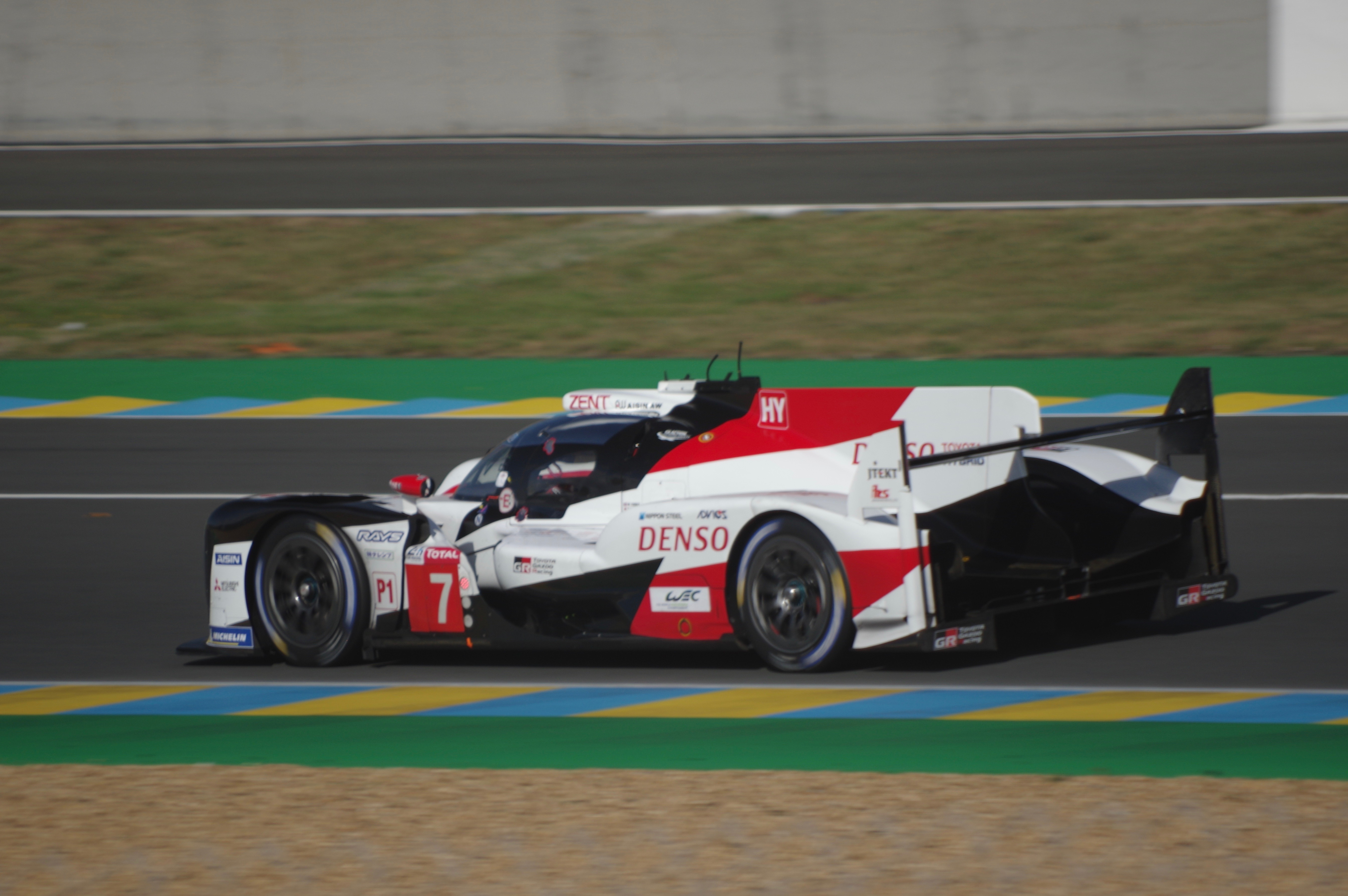
The No. 7 Toyota TS050 Hybrid was forced to give up the race victory due to an incorrect wired antenna on its tyre pressure sensor system

Almost 23 hours into the event, the race leading No. 7 Toyota of López slowed on course due to a wiring fault with the antenna on the car's tyre pressure sensor system, which indicated to the team that the front-right tyre had a puncture. As it occurred late on the track, he was able to make a pit stop; Toyota switched only one tyre to lessen the time lost in the pit lane. López rejoined the track ahead of Nakajima's No. 8 car. However, the sensors on his car continued to notify Toyota that its front-right tyre was punctured, prompting the team to ask a tyre engineer from Michelin, to check its pressure; no issues were discovered. López yielded the lead that the No. 7 car had held for 191 consecutive laps to Nakajima. Toyota had discussed and decided against invoking team orders to switch the positions of both vehicles, and instead they asked both of their crews to hold position to the conclusion of the race following the final pit stop cycle. López entered the pit lane for a second time to replace all four tyres. It transpired that the left-rear tyre was the punctured wheel.

Nakajima achieved victory for the No. 8 Toyota, completing 385 laps, 16.972 seconds ahead of the No. 7 car. SMP, unable to equal Toyota's pace, were six laps behind in third position with its No. 11 car. The Rebellion team were fourth and fifth with the No. 1 and No. 3 entries. It was Alonso, Buemi, Nakajima and Toyota's second successive Le Mans win. The trio won the LMP Drivers' Championship; it was Buemi's second endurance championship since 2014, Alonso's third motor racing world championship and Nakajima became the first Japanese driver to win an FIA-sanctioned world title. Signatech's Lapierre, Negrão and Thiriet was unchallenged for the rest of the race to win in LMP2, earning the team and drivers the LMP2 Championships and Lapierre his fourth class win. The No. 38 Jackie Chan car finished 2 minutes, 22 seconds later in second position and the TDS team were third.

On the 70th anniversary of Ferrari's first overall Le Mans victory, AF Corse won in LMGTE Pro for the first time since 2014, giving Calado and Guidi their first class victories and Serra's second. The car finished 49 seconds ahead of Porsche's No. 91 entry and its No. 93 car took third in class. Porsche's Christensen and Estre finished tenth in class to win the GTE World Drivers' Championship. The Keating Ford of Bleekemoen, Felipe Fraga and Ben Keating led for 273 consecutive laps in LMGTE Am to finish first in the category. Project 1's Bergmeister, Patrick Lindsey and Egidio Perfetti followed 44 seconds later to finish second in class and win the Endurance Trophy for LMGTE Am Drivers and Teams. JMW's Ferrari completed the class podium in third. There were eleven outright lead changes amongst two cars during the race. The No. 7 Toyota's 339 laps led was the most of any car. The No. 8 Toyota led six times for a total of 46 laps.

== Post-race ==
The top three teams in each of the four classes appeared on the podium to collect their trophies and spoke to the media in a later press conference. Alonso and Buemi agreed that the No. 7 crew deserved to win the race. Buemi added, "I was really happy to finish second but what happened to them is really hard. When [the mechanical issues] happened to me and Kazuki in '16, it was really hard too. I am really sorry for them. It's motorsport." Alonso likened the No. 7 car's issue to its lost win on the final lap in 2016 and him finishing second in the Formula One World Championship three times, "When you arrive at the last moment and you are unable to finish the job, you feel bad and I feel sad. I feel for my teammates because they are not only teammates but friends as well. They deserve it today." López said that he was emotional driving to the pit lane to replace the Toyota's supposed puncture and that it was painful.

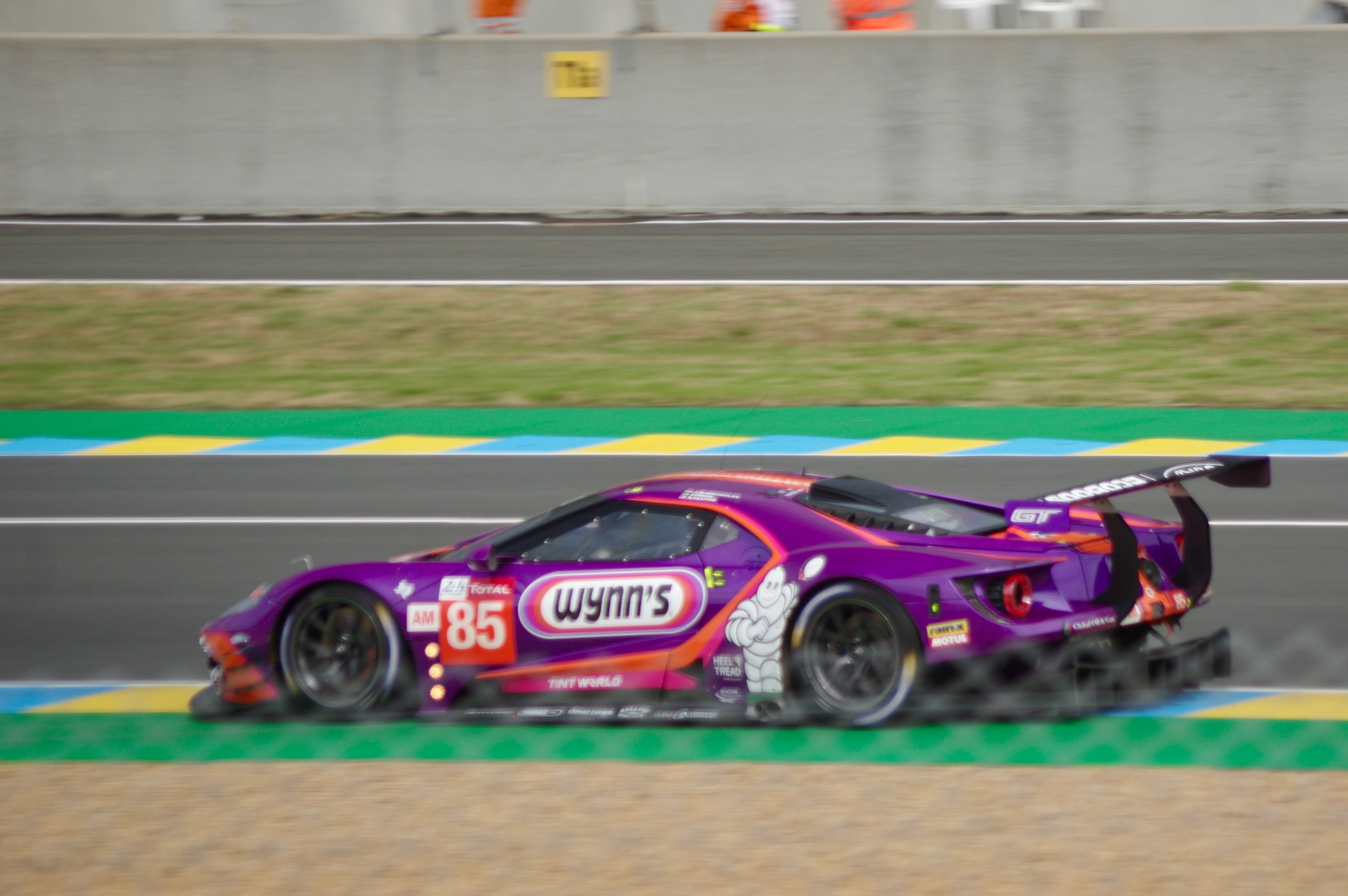
The No. 85 Keating Motorsports Ford GT was disqualified from the race results and lost its LMGTE Am class victory due to an oversized fuel tank.

One day after the event, the FIA imposed a penalty of 55.2 seconds on the LMGTE Am winning No. 85 Keating Ford after ACO scrutineers discovered that the car's refuelling pit stops were completed in 44.4 seconds, under the 45-second minimum. The penalty was calculated by multiplying the total advantage gained (0.6 seconds per pit stop, times 23 pit stops made) by four. The car was later disqualified because its fuel tank was discovered to be 0.1 L (0.022 imp gal; 0.026 US gal) larger than the LMGTE Am maximum mandated capacity of 96 L (21 imp gal; 25 US gal). Keating Motorsports did not appeal the disqualification. The No. 59 Project 1 Porsche was promoted to the class victory, the No. 84 JMW Ferrari to second and the No. 62 WeatherTech Ferrari to third. Keating stated that a rubber bladder inside a fuel cell expanded by 0.4 L (0.088 imp gal; 0.11 US gal) during the race and the team's refuelling rig was made more efficient by six-tenths of a second.

The stewards deemed Fässler responsible for the accident between the No. 64 Corvette and the No. 88 Dempsey-Proton Porsche in the Porsche Curves and issued a fine of €7,000 and six penalty points were added to his race licence. His co-driver, Oliver Gavin, said that Hoshino put Fässler in a position to hit the barrier by unexpectedly changing his direction after allowing faster cars to pass him and called for such manoeuvres to be reviewed. Vergne said he felt disappointed due to his car's unreliability and noted that made the race interesting. Estre stated his belief that the No. 92 Porsche team could have challenged for the victory in LMGTE Pro had car issues not intervened.

The role of the safety cars affecting LMGTE Pro received a mixed response. Andy Priaulx of the Ford team stated that the safety cars should have been used to close up the field, "If you've just pitted, which we needed to pit, it just messes it up so much. It just neutralizes the race and then you end up with this huge separation. For the second year in a row, it's kind of taken away the spectacle at the end." Lietz stated his belief that all of the safety car periods were correctly deployed for safety reasons. The Corvette Racing team manager, Ben Johnson, said he was unsure why some safety car periods were deployed in lieu of full course yellow flags to slow the race and called for clarity on when to use the procedure.

Alonso, Buemi and Nakajima took the LMP Drivers' Championship with 198 points. They were 41 points ahead of their teammates Conway, Kobayashi and López in second position. Laurent and Menezes followed in third place with 114 points, ahead of Aleshin and Petrov in fourth with 94 points and Neel Jani and Lotterer in fifth with 91 points. With 155 points, Estre and Christensen won the GTE Drivers' Championship, 18 1/2 ahead of Calado and Pier Guidi in second. Bruni and Lietz followed in third position with 131 points and Tincknell and Priaulx were fourth with 90 points.

== Official results ==
The minimum number of laps for classification (70 per cent of the overall winning car's race distance) was 270 laps. Class winners are in bold.

Final race classification
Pos	Class	No.	Team	Drivers	Chassis	Tyre	Laps	Time/Reason
Pos	Class	No.	Team	Drivers	Engine	Tyre	Laps	Time/Reason
1	**LMP1**	**8**	**(Japan) Toyota Gazoo Racing**	**(Switzerland) Sébastien Buemi (Japan) Kazuki Nakajima (Spain) Fernando Alonso**	**Toyota TS050 Hybrid**	M	**385**	**24:00:10.574**
1	**LMP1**	**8**	**(Japan) Toyota Gazoo Racing**	**(Switzerland) Sébastien Buemi (Japan) Kazuki Nakajima (Spain) Fernando Alonso**	**Toyota 2.4 L Turbo V6**	M	**385**	**24:00:10.574**
2	LMP1	7	(Japan) Toyota Gazoo Racing	(United Kingdom) Mike Conway (Japan) Kamui Kobayashi (Argentina) José María López	Toyota TS050 Hybrid	M	385	+16.972
2	LMP1	7	(Japan) Toyota Gazoo Racing	(United Kingdom) Mike Conway (Japan) Kamui Kobayashi (Argentina) José María López	Toyota 2.4 L Turbo V6	M	385	+16.972
3	LMP1	11	(Russia) SMP Racing	(Russia) Mikhail Aleshin (Russia) Vitaly Petrov (Belgium) Stoffel Vandoorne	BR Engineering BR1	M	379	+6 laps
3	LMP1	11	(Russia) SMP Racing	(Russia) Mikhail Aleshin (Russia) Vitaly Petrov (Belgium) Stoffel Vandoorne	AER P60B 2.4 L Turbo V6	M	379	+6 laps
4	LMP1	1	(Switzerland) Rebellion Racing	(Brazil) Bruno Senna (Germany) André Lotterer (Switzerland) Neel Jani	Rebellion R13	M	376	+9 laps
4	LMP1	1	(Switzerland) Rebellion Racing	(Brazil) Bruno Senna (Germany) André Lotterer (Switzerland) Neel Jani	Gibson GL458 4.5 L V8	M	376	+9 laps
5	LMP1	3	(Switzerland) Rebellion Racing	(France) Thomas Laurent (United States) Gustavo Menezes (France) Nathanaël Berthon	Rebellion R13	M	370	+15 laps
5	LMP1	3	(Switzerland) Rebellion Racing	(France) Thomas Laurent (United States) Gustavo Menezes (France) Nathanaël Berthon	Gibson GL458 4.5 L V8	M	370	+15 laps
6	**LMP2**	**36**	**(France) Signatech Alpine Matmut**	**(France) Nicolas Lapierre (France) Pierre Thiriet (Brazil) André Negrão**	**Alpine A470**	M	**368**	**+17 laps**
6	**LMP2**	**36**	**(France) Signatech Alpine Matmut**	**(France) Nicolas Lapierre (France) Pierre Thiriet (Brazil) André Negrão**	Gibson GK428 4.2 L V8	M	**368**	**+17 laps**
7	LMP2	38	(China) Jackie Chan DC Racing	(China) Ho-Pin Tung (France) Gabriel Aubry (Monaco) Stéphane Richelmi	Oreca 07	D	367	+18 laps
7	LMP2	38	(China) Jackie Chan DC Racing	(China) Ho-Pin Tung (France) Gabriel Aubry (Monaco) Stéphane Richelmi	Gibson GK428 4.2 L V8	D	367	+18 laps
8	LMP2	28	(France) TDS Racing	(France) François Perrodo (France) Loïc Duval (France) Matthieu Vaxivière	Oreca 07	D	366	+19 laps
8	LMP2	28	(France) TDS Racing	(France) François Perrodo (France) Loïc Duval (France) Matthieu Vaxivière	Gibson GK428 4.2 L V8	D	366	+19 laps
9	LMP2	22	(United States) United Autosports	(United Kingdom) Phil Hanson (United Kingdom) Paul di Resta (Portugal) Filipe Albuquerque	Ligier JS P217	M	365	+20 laps
9	LMP2	22	(United States) United Autosports	(United Kingdom) Phil Hanson (United Kingdom) Paul di Resta (Portugal) Filipe Albuquerque	Gibson GK428 4.2 L V8	M	365	+20 laps
10	LMP2	48	(France) IDEC Sport	(France) Paul Lafargue (France) Paul-Loup Chatin (Mexico) Memo Rojas	Oreca 07	M	364	+21 laps
10	LMP2	48	(France) IDEC Sport	(France) Paul Lafargue (France) Paul-Loup Chatin (Mexico) Memo Rojas	Gibson GK428 4.2 L V8	M	364	+21 laps
11	LMP2	26	(Russia) G-Drive Racing	(Russia) Roman Rusinov (Netherlands) Job van Uitert (France) Jean-Éric Vergne	Aurus 01	D	364	+21 laps
11	LMP2	26	(Russia) G-Drive Racing	(Russia) Roman Rusinov (Netherlands) Job van Uitert (France) Jean-Éric Vergne	Gibson GK428 4.2 L V8	D	364	+21 laps
12	LMP2	30	(France) Duqueine Engineering	(France) Romain Dumas (France) Pierre Ragues (France) Nico Jamin	Oreca 07	M	363	+22 laps
12	LMP2	30	(France) Duqueine Engineering	(France) Romain Dumas (France) Pierre Ragues (France) Nico Jamin	Gibson GK428 4.2 L V8	M	363	+22 laps
13	LMP2	23	(France) Panis Barthez Competition	(Austria) René Binder (United Kingdom) Will Stevens (France) Julien Canal	Ligier JS P217	D	362	+23 laps
13	LMP2	23	(France) Panis Barthez Competition	(Austria) René Binder (United Kingdom) Will Stevens (France) Julien Canal	Gibson GK428 4.2 L V8	D	362	+23 laps
14	LMP2	39	(France) Graff	(France) Tristan Gommendy (France) Vincent Capillaire (Switzerland) Jonathan Hirschi	Oreca 07	M	362	+23 laps
14	LMP2	39	(France) Graff	(France) Tristan Gommendy (France) Vincent Capillaire (Switzerland) Jonathan Hirschi	Gibson GK428 4.2 L V8	M	362	+23 laps
15	LMP2	25	(Portugal) Algarve Pro Racing	(United States) John Falb (France) Andrea Pizzitola (France) David Zollinger	Oreca 07	D	357	+28 laps
15	LMP2	25	(Portugal) Algarve Pro Racing	(United States) John Falb (France) Andrea Pizzitola (France) David Zollinger	Gibson GK428 4.2 L V8	D	357	+28 laps
16	LMP2	20	(Denmark) High Class Racing	(Denmark) Dennis Andersen (Denmark) Anders Fjordbach (Switzerland) Mathias Beche	Oreca 07	D	356	+29 laps
16	LMP2	20	(Denmark) High Class Racing	(Denmark) Dennis Andersen (Denmark) Anders Fjordbach (Switzerland) Mathias Beche	Gibson GK428 4.2 L V8	D	356	+29 laps
17	LMP2	50	(France) Larbre Compétition	(France) Erwin Creed (France) Romano Ricci (United States) Nicholas Boulle	Ligier JS P217	M	355	+30 laps
17	LMP2	50	(France) Larbre Compétition	(France) Erwin Creed (France) Romano Ricci (United States) Nicholas Boulle	Gibson GK428 4.2 L V8	M	355	+30 laps
18	LMP2	47	(Italy) Cetilar Racing Villorba Corse	(Italy) Roberto Lacorte (Italy) Andrea Belicchi (Italy) Giorgio Sernagiotto	Dallara P217	D	352	+33 laps
18	LMP2	47	(Italy) Cetilar Racing Villorba Corse	(Italy) Roberto Lacorte (Italy) Andrea Belicchi (Italy) Giorgio Sernagiotto	Gibson GK428 4.2 L V8	D	352	+33 laps
19	LMP2	32	(United States) United Autosports	(Republic of Ireland) Ryan Cullen (United Kingdom) Alex Brundle (United States) Will Owen	Ligier JS P217	M	348	+37 laps
19	LMP2	32	(United States) United Autosports	(Republic of Ireland) Ryan Cullen (United Kingdom) Alex Brundle (United States) Will Owen	Gibson GK428 4.2 L V8	M	348	+37 laps
20	**LMGTE; Pro**	**51**	**(Italy) AF Corse**	**(United Kingdom) James Calado (Italy) Alessandro Pier Guidi (Brazil) Daniel Serra**	**Ferrari 488 GTE Evo**	M	**342**	**+43 laps**
20	**LMGTE; Pro**	**51**	**(Italy) AF Corse**	**(United Kingdom) James Calado (Italy) Alessandro Pier Guidi (Brazil) Daniel Serra**	**Ferrari F154CB 3.9 L Turbo V8**	M	**342**	**+43 laps**
21	LMGTE; Pro	91	(Germany) Porsche GT Team	(Austria) Richard Lietz (Italy) Gianmaria Bruni (France) Frédéric Makowiecki	Porsche 911 RSR	M	342	+43 laps
21	LMGTE; Pro	91	(Germany) Porsche GT Team	(Austria) Richard Lietz (Italy) Gianmaria Bruni (France) Frédéric Makowiecki	Porsche 4.0 L Flat-6	M	342	+43 laps
22	LMGTE; Pro	93	(United States) Porsche GT Team	(United Kingdom) Nick Tandy (New Zealand) Earl Bamber (France) Patrick Pilet	Porsche 911 RSR	M	342	+43 laps
22	LMGTE; Pro	93	(United States) Porsche GT Team	(United Kingdom) Nick Tandy (New Zealand) Earl Bamber (France) Patrick Pilet	Porsche 4.0 L Flat-6	M	342	+43 laps
23	LMGTE; Pro	67	(United States) Ford Chip Ganassi Team UK	(United Kingdom) Harry Tincknell (United Kingdom) Andy Priaulx (United States) Jonathan Bomarito	Ford GT	M	342	+43 laps
23	LMGTE; Pro	67	(United States) Ford Chip Ganassi Team UK	(United Kingdom) Harry Tincknell (United Kingdom) Andy Priaulx (United States) Jonathan Bomarito	Ford EcoBoost 3.5 L Turbo V6	M	342	+43 laps
24	LMGTE; Pro	69	(United States) Ford Chip Ganassi Team USA	(Australia) Ryan Briscoe (New Zealand) Scott Dixon (United Kingdom) Richard Westbrook	Ford GT	M	341	+44 laps
24	LMGTE; Pro	69	(United States) Ford Chip Ganassi Team USA	(Australia) Ryan Briscoe (New Zealand) Scott Dixon (United Kingdom) Richard Westbrook	Ford EcoBoost 3.5 L Turbo V6	M	341	+44 laps
25	LMGTE; Pro	66	(United States) Ford Chip Ganassi Team UK	(Germany) Stefan Mücke (France) Olivier Pla (United States) Billy Johnson	Ford GT	M	340	+45 laps
25	LMGTE; Pro	66	(United States) Ford Chip Ganassi Team UK	(Germany) Stefan Mücke (France) Olivier Pla (United States) Billy Johnson	Ford EcoBoost 3.5 L Turbo V6	M	340	+45 laps
26	LMP2	29	(Netherlands) Racing Team Nederland	(Netherlands) Giedo van der Garde (Netherlands) Nyck de Vries (Netherlands) Frits van Eerd	Dallara P217	M	340	+45 laps
26	LMP2	29	(Netherlands) Racing Team Nederland	(Netherlands) Giedo van der Garde (Netherlands) Nyck de Vries (Netherlands) Frits van Eerd	Gibson GK428 4.2 L V8	M	340	+45 laps
27	LMGTE; Pro	94	(United States) Porsche GT Team	(Germany) Sven Müller (France) Mathieu Jaminet (Norway) Dennis Olsen	Porsche 911 RSR	M	339	+46 laps
27	LMGTE; Pro	94	(United States) Porsche GT Team	(Germany) Sven Müller (France) Mathieu Jaminet (Norway) Dennis Olsen	Porsche 4.0 L Flat-6	M	339	+46 laps
28	LMGTE; Pro	63	(United States) Corvette Racing	(Denmark) Jan Magnussen (Spain) Antonio García (Germany) Mike Rockenfeller	Chevrolet Corvette C7.R	M	337	+48 laps
28	LMGTE; Pro	63	(United States) Corvette Racing	(Denmark) Jan Magnussen (Spain) Antonio García (Germany) Mike Rockenfeller	Chevrolet LT5.5 5.5 L V8	M	337	+48 laps
29	LMGTE; Pro	92	(Germany) Porsche GT Team	(Denmark) Michael Christensen (France) Kévin Estre (Belgium) Laurens Vanthoor	Porsche 911 RSR	M	337	+48 laps
29	LMGTE; Pro	92	(Germany) Porsche GT Team	(Denmark) Michael Christensen (France) Kévin Estre (Belgium) Laurens Vanthoor	Porsche 4.0 L Flat-6	M	337	+48 laps
30	LMGTE; Pro	82	(Germany) BMW Team MTEK	(Brazil) Augusto Farfus (Finland) Jesse Krohn (Portugal) António Félix da Costa	BMW M8 GTE	M	335	+50 laps
30	LMGTE; Pro	82	(Germany) BMW Team MTEK	(Brazil) Augusto Farfus (Finland) Jesse Krohn (Portugal) António Félix da Costa	BMW S63 4.0 L Turbo V8	M	335	+50 laps
31	**LMGTE; Am**	**56**	**(Germany) Team Project 1**	**(Germany) Jörg Bergmeister (United States) Patrick Lindsey (Norway) Egidio Perfetti**	**Porsche 911 RSR**	M	**334**	**+51 laps**
31	**LMGTE; Am**	**56**	**(Germany) Team Project 1**	**(Germany) Jörg Bergmeister (United States) Patrick Lindsey (Norway) Egidio Perfetti**	**Porsche 4.0 L Flat-6**	M	**334**	**+51 laps**
32	LMGTE; Am	84	(United Kingdom) JMW Motorsport	(United States) Jeff Segal (Brazil) Rodrigo Baptista (Canada) Wei Lu	Ferrari 488 GTE	M	334	+51 laps
32	LMGTE; Am	84	(United Kingdom) JMW Motorsport	(United States) Jeff Segal (Brazil) Rodrigo Baptista (Canada) Wei Lu	Ferrari F154CB 3.9 L Turbo V8	M	334	+51 laps
33	LMGTE; Am	62	(United States) WeatherTech Racing	(United States) Cooper MacNeil (United Kingdom) Robert Smith (Finland) Toni Vilander	Ferrari 488 GTE	M	333	+52 laps
33	LMGTE; Am	62	(United States) WeatherTech Racing	(United States) Cooper MacNeil (United Kingdom) Robert Smith (Finland) Toni Vilander	Ferrari F154CB 3.9 L Turbo V8	M	333	+52 laps
34	LMGTE; Am	77	(Germany) Dempsey-Proton Racing	(Australia) Matt Campbell (France) Julien Andlauer (Germany) Christian Ried	Porsche 911 RSR	M	332	+53 laps
34	LMGTE; Am	77	(Germany) Dempsey-Proton Racing	(Australia) Matt Campbell (France) Julien Andlauer (Germany) Christian Ried	Porsche 4.0 L Flat-6	M	332	+53 laps
35	LMGTE; Am	57	(Japan) Car Guy Racing	(Japan) Takeshi Kimura (Italy) Kei Cozzolino (France) Côme Ledogar	Ferrari 488 GTE	M	332	+53 laps
35	LMGTE; Am	57	(Japan) Car Guy Racing	(Japan) Takeshi Kimura (Italy) Kei Cozzolino (France) Côme Ledogar	Ferrari F154CB 3.9 L Turbo V8	M	332	+53 laps
36	LMGTE; Am	78	(Germany) Proton Competition	(Monaco) Louis Prette (Monaco) Philippe Prette (Monaco) Vincent Abril	Porsche 911 RSR	M	332	+53 laps
36	LMGTE; Am	78	(Germany) Proton Competition	(Monaco) Louis Prette (Monaco) Philippe Prette (Monaco) Vincent Abril	Porsche 4.0 L Flat-6	M	332	+53 laps
37	LMGTE; Am	61	(Singapore) Clearwater Racing	(Republic of Ireland) Matt Griffin (Italy) Matteo Cressoni (Argentina) Luis Pérez Companc	Ferrari 488 GTE	M	331	+54 laps
37	LMGTE; Am	61	(Singapore) Clearwater Racing	(Republic of Ireland) Matt Griffin (Italy) Matteo Cressoni (Argentina) Luis Pérez Companc	Ferrari F154CB 3.9 L Turbo V8	M	331	+54 laps
38	LMGTE; Am	86	(United Kingdom) Gulf Racing	(United Kingdom) Michael Wainwright (United Kingdom) Ben Barker (Austria) Thomas Preining	Porsche 911 RSR	M	331	+54 laps
38	LMGTE; Am	86	(United Kingdom) Gulf Racing	(United Kingdom) Michael Wainwright (United Kingdom) Ben Barker (Austria) Thomas Preining	Porsche 4.0 L Flat-6	M	331	+54 laps
39	LMGTE; Am	83	(Switzerland) Kessel Racing	(Switzerland) Rahel Frey (Denmark) Michelle Gatting (Italy) Manuela Gostner	Ferrari 488 GTE	M	330	+55 laps
39	LMGTE; Am	83	(Switzerland) Kessel Racing	(Switzerland) Rahel Frey (Denmark) Michelle Gatting (Italy) Manuela Gostner	Ferrari F154CB 3.9 L Turbo V8	M	330	+55 laps
40	LMGTE; Pro	89	(United States) Risi Competizione	(United Kingdom) Oliver Jarvis (France) Jules Gounon (Brazil) Pipo Derani	Ferrari 488 GTE Evo	M	329	+56 laps
40	LMGTE; Pro	89	(United States) Risi Competizione	(United Kingdom) Oliver Jarvis (France) Jules Gounon (Brazil) Pipo Derani	Ferrari F154CB 3.9 L Turbo V8	M	329	+56 laps
41	LMGTE; Am	70	(Japan) MR Racing	(Monaco) Olivier Beretta (Italy) Eddie Cheever III (Japan) Motoaki Ishikawa	Ferrari 488 GTE	M	328	+57 laps
41	LMGTE; Am	70	(Japan) MR Racing	(Monaco) Olivier Beretta (Italy) Eddie Cheever III (Japan) Motoaki Ishikawa	Ferrari F154CB 3.9 L Turbo V8	M	328	+57 laps
42	LMGTE; Am	90	(United Kingdom) TF Sport	(Republic of Ireland) Charlie Eastwood (Turkey) Salih Yoluç (United Kingdom) Euan Hankey	Aston Martin Vantage GTE	M	327	+58 laps
42	LMGTE; Am	90	(United Kingdom) TF Sport	(Republic of Ireland) Charlie Eastwood (Turkey) Salih Yoluç (United Kingdom) Euan Hankey	Aston Martin AJ37 4.5 L V8	M	327	+58 laps
43	LMGTE; Am	54	(Switzerland) Spirit of Race	(Switzerland) Thomas Flohr (Italy) Francesco Castellacci (Italy) Giancarlo Fisichella	Ferrari 488 GTE	M	327	+58 laps
43	LMGTE; Am	54	(Switzerland) Spirit of Race	(Switzerland) Thomas Flohr (Italy) Francesco Castellacci (Italy) Giancarlo Fisichella	Ferrari F154CB 3.9 L Turbo V8	M	327	+58 laps
44	LMGTE; Pro	97	(United Kingdom) Aston Martin Racing	(United Kingdom) Alex Lynn (United Kingdom) Jonathan Adam (Belgium) Maxime Martin	Aston Martin Vantage AMR	M	325	+60 laps
44	LMGTE; Pro	97	(United Kingdom) Aston Martin Racing	(United Kingdom) Alex Lynn (United Kingdom) Jonathan Adam (Belgium) Maxime Martin	Aston Martin 4.0 L Turbo V8	M	325	+60 laps
45	LMP2	34	(Poland) Inter Europol Competition	(Poland) Jakub Śmiechowski (United Kingdom) James Winslow (United Kingdom) Nigel Moore	Ligier JS P217	M	325	+60 laps
45	LMP2	34	(Poland) Inter Europol Competition	(Poland) Jakub Śmiechowski (United Kingdom) James Winslow (United Kingdom) Nigel Moore	Gibson GK428 4.2 L V8	M	325	+60 laps
46	LMGTE; Am	60	(Switzerland) Kessel Racing	(Italy) Claudio Schiavoni (Italy) Sergio Pianezzola (Italy) Andrea Piccini	Ferrari 488 GTE	M	324	+61 laps
46	LMGTE; Am	60	(Switzerland) Kessel Racing	(Italy) Claudio Schiavoni (Italy) Sergio Pianezzola (Italy) Andrea Piccini	Ferrari F154CB 3.9 L Turbo V8	M	324	+61 laps
47	LMGTE; Pro	81	(Germany) BMW Team MTEK	(Netherlands) Nick Catsburg (Austria) Philipp Eng (Germany) Martin Tomczyk	BMW M8 GTE	M	309	+76 laps
47	LMGTE; Pro	81	(Germany) BMW Team MTEK	(Netherlands) Nick Catsburg (Austria) Philipp Eng (Germany) Martin Tomczyk	BMW S63 4.0 L Turbo V8	M	309	+76 laps
NC	LMP2	43	(United Kingdom) RLR MSport/Tower Events	(Canada) John Farano (India) Arjun Maini (France) Norman Nato	Oreca 07	D	295	Incomplete final lap
NC	LMP2	43	(United Kingdom) RLR MSport/Tower Events	(Canada) John Farano (India) Arjun Maini (France) Norman Nato	Gibson GK428 4.2 L V8	D	295	Incomplete final lap
DNF	LMP2	31	(United States) DragonSpeed	(Mexico) Roberto González (Venezuela) Pastor Maldonado (United Kingdom) Anthony Davidson	Oreca 07	M	245	Crash
DNF	LMP2	31	(United States) DragonSpeed	(Mexico) Roberto González (Venezuela) Pastor Maldonado (United Kingdom) Anthony Davidson	Gibson GK428 4.2 L V8	M	245	Crash
DNF	LMP2	37	(China) Jackie Chan DC Racing	(Denmark) David Heinemeier Hansson (United Kingdom) Jordan King (United States) Ricky Taylor	Oreca 07	D	199	Gearbox
DNF	LMP2	37	(China) Jackie Chan DC Racing	(Denmark) David Heinemeier Hansson (United Kingdom) Jordan King (United States) Ricky Taylor	Gibson GK428 4.2 L V8	D	199	Gearbox
DNF	LMP1	17	(Russia) SMP Racing	(France) Stéphane Sarrazin (Russia) Egor Orudzhev (Russia) Sergey Sirotkin	BR Engineering BR1	M	163	Crash
DNF	LMP1	17	(Russia) SMP Racing	(France) Stéphane Sarrazin (Russia) Egor Orudzhev (Russia) Sergey Sirotkin	AER P60B 2.4 L Turbo V6	M	163	Crash
DNF	LMP1	4	(Austria) ByKolles Racing Team	(France) Tom Dillmann (United Kingdom) Oliver Webb (Italy) Paolo Ruberti	ENSO CLM P1/01	M	163	Mechanical
DNF	LMP1	4	(Austria) ByKolles Racing Team	(France) Tom Dillmann (United Kingdom) Oliver Webb (Italy) Paolo Ruberti	Gibson GL458 4.5 L V8	M	163	Mechanical
DNF	LMP2	49	(Slovakia) ARC Bratislava	(Slovakia) Miro Konôpka (Russia) Konstantin Tereshchenko (Sweden) Henning Enqvist	Ligier JS P217	D	160	Crash damage
DNF	LMP2	49	(Slovakia) ARC Bratislava	(Slovakia) Miro Konôpka (Russia) Konstantin Tereshchenko (Sweden) Henning Enqvist	Gibson GK428 4.2 L V8	D	160	Crash damage
DNF	LMGTE; Pro	71	(Italy) AF Corse	(Italy) Davide Rigon (United Kingdom) Sam Bird (Spain) Miguel Molina	Ferrari 488 GTE Evo	M	140	Engine
DNF	LMGTE; Pro	71	(Italy) AF Corse	(Italy) Davide Rigon (United Kingdom) Sam Bird (Spain) Miguel Molina	Ferrari F154CB 3.9 L Turbo V8	M	140	Engine
DNF	LMGTE; Pro	95	(United Kingdom) Aston Martin Racing	(Denmark) Nicki Thiim (Denmark) Marco Sørensen (United Kingdom) Darren Turner	Aston Martin Vantage AMR	M	132	Crash damage
DNF	LMGTE; Pro	95	(United Kingdom) Aston Martin Racing	(Denmark) Nicki Thiim (Denmark) Marco Sørensen (United Kingdom) Darren Turner	Aston Martin 4.0 L Turbo V8	M	132	Crash damage
DNF	LMGTE; Am	98	(United Kingdom) Aston Martin Racing	(Canada) Paul Dalla Lana (Austria) Mathias Lauda (Portugal) Pedro Lamy	Aston Martin Vantage GTE	M	87	Crash
DNF	LMGTE; Am	98	(United Kingdom) Aston Martin Racing	(Canada) Paul Dalla Lana (Austria) Mathias Lauda (Portugal) Pedro Lamy	Aston Martin AJ37 4.5 L V8	M	87	Crash
DNF	LMGTE; Pro	64	(United States) Corvette Racing	(United Kingdom) Oliver Gavin (United States) Tommy Milner (Switzerland) Marcel Fässler	Chevrolet Corvette C7.R	M	82	Contact
DNF	LMGTE; Pro	64	(United States) Corvette Racing	(United Kingdom) Oliver Gavin (United States) Tommy Milner (Switzerland) Marcel Fässler	Chevrolet LT5.5 5.5 L V8	M	82	Contact
DNF	LMGTE; Am	88	(Germany) Dempsey-Proton Racing	(Italy) Matteo Cairoli (Italy) Giorgio Roda (Japan) Satoshi Hoshino	Porsche 911 RSR	M	79	Retired
DNF	LMGTE; Am	88	(Germany) Dempsey-Proton Racing	(Italy) Matteo Cairoli (Italy) Giorgio Roda (Japan) Satoshi Hoshino	Porsche 4.0 L Flat-6	M	79	Retired
DNF	LMP1	10	(United States) DragonSpeed	(United Kingdom) Ben Hanley (Netherlands) Renger van der Zande (Sweden) Henrik Hedman	BR Engineering BR1	M	76	Gearbox
DNF	LMP1	10	(United States) DragonSpeed	(United Kingdom) Ben Hanley (Netherlands) Renger van der Zande (Sweden) Henrik Hedman	Gibson GL458 4.5 L V8	M	76	Gearbox
DSQ	LMGTE; Pro	68	(United States) Ford Chip Ganassi Team USA	(France) Sébastien Bourdais (United States) Joey Hand (Germany) Dirk Müller	Ford GT	M	342	Disqualified (Note: The No. 68 Chip Ganassi Team USA and No. 85 Keating Motorsports Fords were disqualified for exceeding the permitted fuel capacity.)
DSQ	LMGTE; Pro	68	(United States) Ford Chip Ganassi Team USA	(France) Sébastien Bourdais (United States) Joey Hand (Germany) Dirk Müller	Ford EcoBoost 3.5 L Turbo V6	M	342	Disqualified
DSQ	LMGTE; Am	85	(United States) Keating Motorsports	(United States) Ben Keating (Netherlands) Jeroen Bleekemolen (Brazil) Felipe Fraga	Ford GT	M	334	Disqualified
DSQ	LMGTE; Am	85	(United States) Keating Motorsports	(United States) Ben Keating (Netherlands) Jeroen Bleekemolen (Brazil) Felipe Fraga	Ford EcoBoost 3.5 L Turbo V6	M	334	Disqualified
WD	LMGTE; Am	99	(Germany) Dempsey-Proton Racing	(United States) Patrick Long (United States) Tracy Krohn (Sweden) Niclas Jönsson	Porsche 911 RSR	M	—	Withdrawn
WD	LMGTE; Am	99	(Germany) Dempsey-Proton Racing	(United States) Patrick Long (United States) Tracy Krohn (Sweden) Niclas Jönsson	Porsche 4.0 L Flat-6	M	—	Withdrawn

Tyre manufacturers
Key
Symbol	Tyre manufacturer
**D**	Dunlop
**M**	Michelin

== Championship standings after the race ==
2018–2019 LMP World Endurance Drivers' Championship
Pos.	+/–	Driver	Points
1		(Spain) Fernando Alonso (Japan) Kazuki Nakajima (Switzerland) Sébastien Buemi	198
2		(Japan) Kamui Kobayashi (United Kingdom) Mike Conway (Argentina) José María López	157
3		(France) Thomas Laurent (United States) Gustavo Menezes	114
4	2	(Russia) Mikhail Aleshin (Russia) Vitaly Petrov	94
5		(Switzerland) Neel Jani (Germany) André Lotterer	73

2018–2019 LMP1 World Endurance Championship
Pos.	+/–	Team	Points
1		(Japan) Toyota Gazoo Racing	216
2		(Switzerland) Rebellion Racing	134
3		(Russia) SMP Racing	109
4		(Austria) ByKolles Racing Team	22.5
5		(United States) DragonSpeed	8.5
6		(United Kingdom) CEFC TRSM Racing	1

- Note: Only the top five positions are included for Drivers' Championship standings.

2018–2019 World Endurance GTE Drivers' Championship
Pos.	+/–	Driver	Points
1		(Denmark) Michael Christensen (France) Kévin Estre	155
2	1	(United Kingdom) James Calado (Italy) Alessandro Pier Guidi	136.5
3	1	(Italy) Gianmaria Bruni (Austria) Richard Lietz	130
4		(United Kingdom) Andy Priaulx (United Kingdom) Harry Tincknell	90
5	1	(Germany) Stefan Mücke (France) Olivier Pla	88

2018–2019 World Endurance GTE Manufacturers' Championship
Pos.	+/–	Constructor	Points
1		(Germany) Porsche	288
2		(Italy) Ferrari	194
3		(United States) Ford	178
4		(United Kingdom) Aston Martin	136
5		(Germany) BMW	114

- Note: Only the top five positions are included for the Drivers' Championship standings.

== See also ==
- 2019 Road to Le Mans

FIA World Endurance Championship
Previous race: 6 Hours of Spa-Francorchamps	2018–19 season	Next race: none
