= Ligier JS P228 =

LMP2 racing car

- Category: Le Mans Prototype 2 (LMP2)
- Constructor: Ligier Automotive
- Designer: Cyril Reboul
- Predecessor: Ligier JS P217

Technical specifications
- Suspension (front): Double wishbone, push rod operated over damper
- Suspension (rear): Double wishbone, push rod operated over damper
- Engine: Gibson 3.4 L (3,400.0 cc; 207.5 cu in) V6 turbocharged mid-engined, longitudinally mounted
- Tyres: Goodyear

Competition history
- Notable entrants: (Portugal) Algarve Pro Racing (Italy) EuroInternational (Poland) Inter Europol Competition (France) Panis Racing

The Ligier JS P228 is an upcoming Le Mans Prototype built by French manufacturer Ligier Automotive to meet the 2028 FIA/ACO LMP2 regulations.
