= Ligier JS P217 =

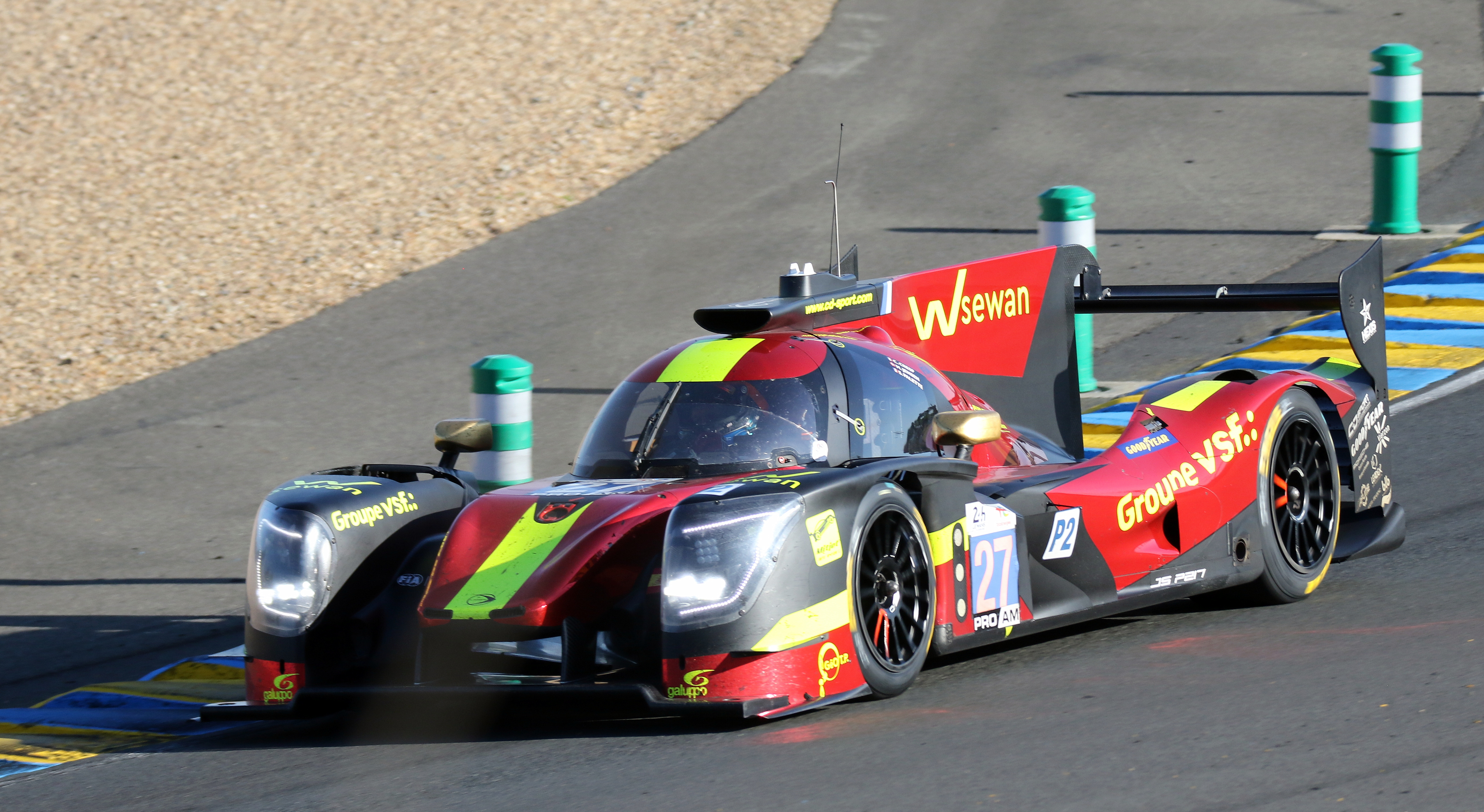
- The No. 27 JS P217 at the 2022 24 Hours of Le Mans
- Category: Le Mans Prototype 2
- Constructor: Onroak Automotive
- Designer: Nicolas Clémençon
- Predecessor: Ligier JS P2
- Successor: Ligier JS P228

Technical specifications
- Chassis: Carbon fibre monocoque
- Suspension (front): Double wishbones with pushrod and torque rod-activated dampers
- Suspension (rear): Double wishbones with spring-activated dampers
- Length: 4,745 mm (186.8 in)
- Width: 1,900 mm (75 in)
- Height: 1,050 mm (41 in)
- Wheelbase: 3,010 mm (119 in)
- Engine: Gibson GK428 4.2 litre V8 longitudinal mid-mounted configuration
- Transmission: Hewland TLS-200 6-speed sequential gearbox magnesium casing sequential manual transmission
- Power: 603 hp (450 kW)
- Weight: Appr. 930 kg (2,050 lb)
- Fuel: Various
- Lubricants: Various
- Tyres: Michelin, Dunlop, or Continental

Competition history
- Notable entrants: (Portugal) Algarve Pro Racing (Italy) EuroInternational (France) IDEC Sport Racing (Poland) Inter Europol Competition (France) Larbre Compétition (France) Panis Barthez Competition (China) CEFC Manor TRS Racing (United States) PR1/Mathiasen Motorsports (United States) Visit Florida Racing (United States) United Autosports (Slovakia) ARC Bratislava (Philippines) RWR Eurasia
- Notable drivers: (United Kingdom) Tom Kimber-Smith (Mexico) José Gutiérrez (United States) R. C. Enerson (United States) Will Owen (Italy) Marco Bonanomi (United States) Kenton Koch (France) Olivier Pla (United States) Nicholas Boulle (Canada) David Ostella (France) Julien Canal (Belgium) Marc Goossens (Netherlands) Renger van der Zande (Germany) René Rast (United States) Jonathan Bomarito (Spain) Fernando Alonso (United Kingdom) Philip Hanson (United Kingdom) Lando Norris (United Kingdom) Paul di Resta (Brazil) Bruno Senna (Switzerland) Hugo de Sadeleer (United Kingdom) Alex Brundle (Colombia) Sebastián Saavedra (Colombia) Gustavo Yacamán (Mexico) Roberto González (United States) Austin Dillon (Germany) Sven Müller (United States) Cody Ware (Turkey) Salih Yoluç (France) Fabien Barthez (France) Nathanaël Berthon (United States) Matt McMurry (France) Andrea Pizzitola (France) Paul-Loup Chatin (Portugal) Filipe Albuquerque (United Kingdom) Nigel Moore (United Kingdom) Wayne Boyd (United Kingdom) Will Stevens (United States) Mark Patterson (France) Nicolas Minassian (France) Aurélien Panis (United Kingdom) Paul di Resta (Republic of Ireland) Ryan Cullen (Austria) René Binder (Russia) Konstantin Tereshchenko (Spain) Dani Clos (Poland) Jakub Śmiechowski (France) Adrien Tambay (Russia) Matevos Isaakyan (India) Karun Chandhok (Japan) Keiko Ihara (United States) Gunnar Jeannette (Spain) Roberto Merhi (Slovakia) Miro Konôpka (United Kingdom) Oliver Webb (New Zealand) Daniel Gaunt (New Zealand) Nick Cassidy (New Zealand) Shane van Gisbergen (Singapore) Danial Frost (United Kingdom) James Winslow
- Debut: 2017 24 Hours of Daytona
- First win: 2017 4 Hours of Silverstone
- Last win: 2022 ESET Cup GT Sprint Race 2
- Last event: 2024 IMSA SportsCar Weekend
Races	Wins	Podiums	Poles	F/Laps
74	7	17	0	0
- Teams' Championships: 0
- Constructors' Championships: 0
- Drivers' Championships: 0

The Ligier JS P217 is a Le Mans Prototype built by Onroak Automotive and named in a partnership with French racing driver Guy Ligier. The Ligier JS P217 was built to meet the 2017 FIA and ACO regulations for 2017 for the LMP2 category in the FIA World Endurance Championship. The car also meets the regulations for the International Motor Sports Association’s (IMSA) WeatherTech SportsCar Championship for the Prototype class. It was active in both of these championship series as well as the European Le Mans Series and Asian Le Mans Series.

The prototype made its racing debut at the 2017 24 Hours of Daytona and its FIA World Endurance Championship debut at the 2017 6 Hours of Spa-Francorchamps.

== Development ==
The Liger JS P217 was conceived in 2016 in preparation for the FIA and ACO's new regulation changes in 2017. Onroak Automotive built a brand new chassis from scratch and focused on improving the mechanics of the car from the Ligier JS P2. Onroak and technical partners focused on the air cooling of the engine radiators and brakes and cockpit air conditioning. The mechanical features of the car that were concentrated on was the implementation of a new axle, nut, and rim to lessen the time of tire changes, the efficiency of the axles, weight distribution, accessibility of mechanics at the front of the cockpit, aerodynamic efficiency, LMP1 style power steering, and a limited number of chassis pieces. The driver's comfort, space, controls accessibility, and visibility also was paid attention to as well.

The car was unveiled at Spa-Francorchamps publicly in September 2016. It also performed tests at Magny-Cours in September 2016 and Daytona International Speedway in November 2016 for preparation for the 24 Hours of Daytona.

== Nissan Onroak DPi ==
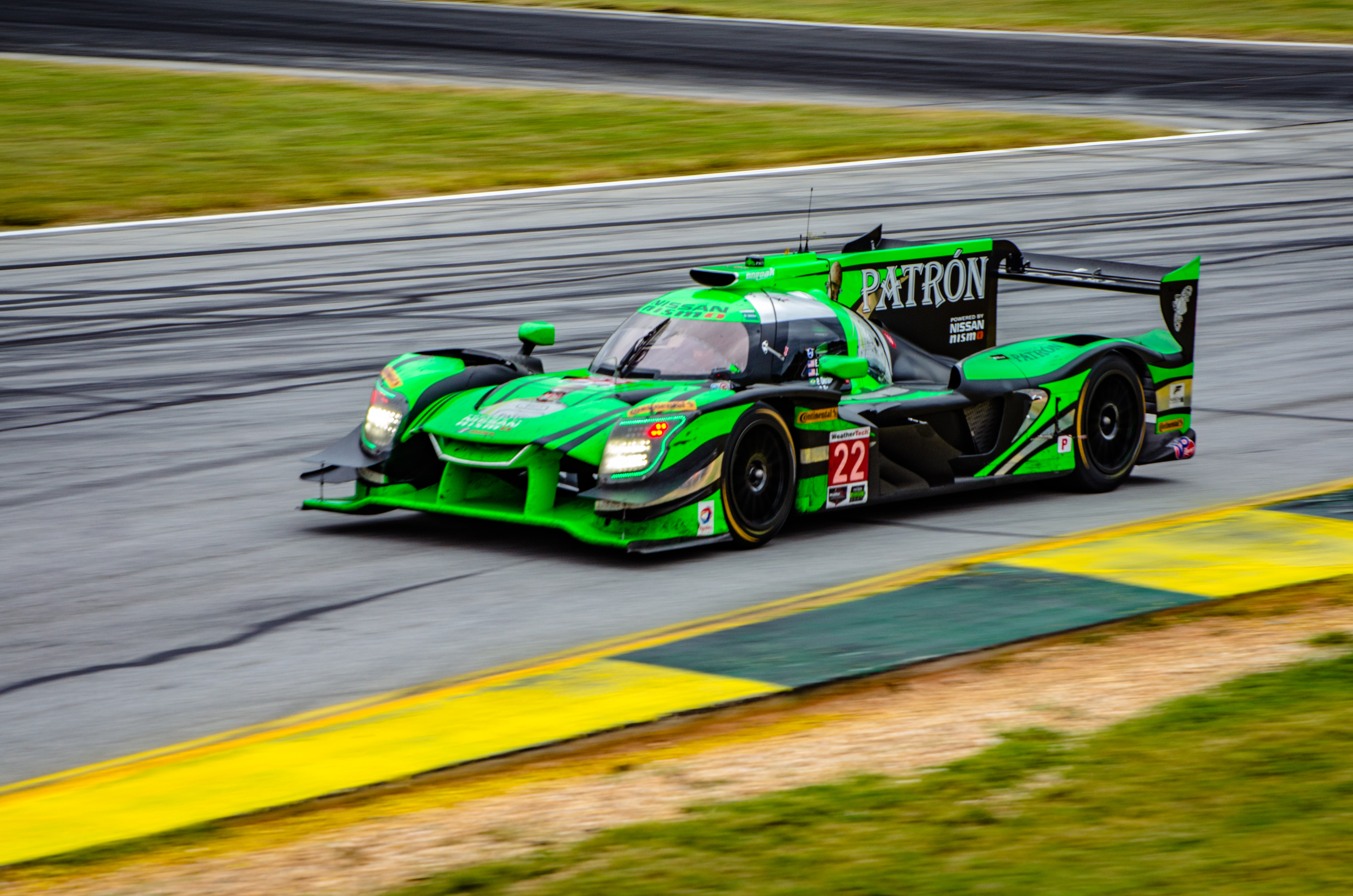
Nissan Onroak DPi in 2017 Petit Le Mans.

A variation of the prototype, the Nissan Onroak DPi, also known as the Ligier Nissan DPi, was created for the IMSA's WeatherTech SportsCar Championship Prototype class under the DPi regulations. The car was developed in partnership with Nissan and Nismo. The powerplant of the vehicle is a 3.8 litre V6 twin-turbo engine from the Nissan GT-R GT3. Other alterations from the P217 include a large front panel and revised side panels. Onroak Automotive supplied Tequila Patrón ESM with two prototypes for the WeatherTech SportsCar Championship. ESM ran the DPi until closing due to a lack of sponsorship in late 2018. CORE Autosport would purchase the ESM DPis and run them for the 2019 season. The program would not continue due to the retirement of team owner Jon Bennett.

== Ligier JS PX ==
Revealed in 2021, the Ligier JS PX is an unrestricted track-day special based on the JS P217. Seemingly an evolution of the Onroak DPi, the JS PX utilizes a 3.8 liter V6 twin-turbo engine, yet developed to 825 hp. The chassis, suspension, and transmission are identical to the P217, though Ligier optimized ABS, TC, and ECU systems using input from Olivier Pla. A similarly large front panel to that of the Nissan DPi is utilized, with an extended nose and a copycat element directly under it. The PX retains single canards on each side like the P217, in place of the DPi's dual-canard setup on each side. While the enlarged cooling duct from the DPi used to cool the NISMO VR38DETT is present, the side panels see simplification in the form of removal of a turning vane.

The car would be featured as the main protagonist's Le Mans entry in the 2023 film Gran Turismo, complete with a racing livery with PlayStation and NISMO sponsorship, further proving relevance to the DPi racecar.

== Complete FIA World Endurance Championship results ==
Results in bold indicate pole position. Results in italics indicate fastest lap.

Year	Entrant	Class	Drivers	No.	1	2	3	4	5	6	7	8	9	Points	Pos
Year	Entrant	Class	Drivers	No.	**(United Kingdom)**; **SIL**	**(Belgium)**; **SPA**	**(France)**; **24H**	**(Germany)**; **NUR**	**(Mexico)**; **MEX**	**(United States)**; **COTA**	**(Japan)**; **FUJ**	**(China)**; **SHA**	**(Bahrain)**; **BHR**	Points	Pos
**2017**	(United Kingdom) Tockwith Motorsports	LMP2	(United Kingdom) Nigel Moore	34		Ret	9	Ret						**0**	**NC**
**2017**	(United Kingdom) Tockwith Motorsports	LMP2	(United Kingdom) Philip Hanson	34		Ret	9	Ret						**0**	**NC**
**2017**	(United Kingdom) Tockwith Motorsports	LMP2	(India) Karun Chandhok	34		Ret	9							**0**	**NC**
				No.	**(Belgium)**; **SPA**	**(France)**; **24H**	**(United Kingdom)**; **SIL**	**(Japan)**; **FUJ**	**(China)**; **SHA**	**(United States)**; **SEB**	**(Belgium)**; **SPA**	**(France)**; **24H**		Points	Pos
**2018 - 2019**	(France) Larbre Compétition	LMP2	(France) Erwin Creed	50	6	6	6	5	6	4	6	4		**85**	**5th**
**2018 - 2019**	(France) Larbre Compétition	LMP2	(France) Romano Ricci	50	6	6	6	5	6	4	6	4		**85**	**5th**
**2018 - 2019**	(France) Larbre Compétition	LMP2	(France) Julien Canal	50	6									**85**	**5th**
**2018 - 2019**	(France) Larbre Compétition	LMP2	(France) Thomas Dagoneau	50		6								**85**	**5th**
**2018 - 2019**	(France) Larbre Compétition	LMP2	(Japan) Yoshiharu Mori	50			6							**85**	**5th**
**2018 - 2019**	(France) Larbre Compétition	LMP2	(Japan) Keiko Ihara	50				5						**85**	**5th**
**2018 - 2019**	(France) Larbre Compétition	LMP2	(France) Enzo Guibbert	50					6					**85**	**5th**
**2018 - 2019**	(France) Larbre Compétition	LMP2	(United States) Gunnar Jeannette	50						4				**85**	**5th**
**2018 - 2019**	(France) Larbre Compétition	LMP2	(United States) Nicholas Boulle	50							7	4		**85**	**5th**
				No.	**(United Kingdom)**; **SIL**	**(Japan)**; **FUJ**	**(China)**; **SHA**	**(Bahrain)**; **BHR**	**(United States)**; **COTA**	**(Belgium)**; **SPA**	**(France)**; **24H**	**(Bahrain)**; **BHR**		Points	Pos
**2019 - 2020**	(Philippines) Eurasia Motorsport	LMP2	(Australia) Nick Foster	35						8	14			**0**	**NC**
**2019 - 2020**	(Philippines) Eurasia Motorsport	LMP2	(Spain) Roberto Merhi	35						8	14			**0**	**NC**
**2019 - 2020**	(Philippines) Eurasia Motorsport	LMP2	(Japan) Nobuya Yamanaka	35						8	14			**0**	**NC**
**2019 - 2020**	(Poland) Inter Europol Competition	LMP2	(Austria) René Binder	34							17			**0**	**NC**
**2019 - 2020**	(Poland) Inter Europol Competition	LMP2	(Russia) Matevos Isaakyan	34							17			**0**	**NC**
**2019 - 2020**	(Poland) Inter Europol Competition	LMP2	(Poland) Jakub Śmiechowski	34							17			**0**	**NC**
**2019 - 2020**	(Italy) EuroInternational	LMP2	(Belgium) Christophe d'Ansembourg	11							Ret			**0**	**NC**
**2019 - 2020**	(Italy) EuroInternational	LMP2	(France) Erik Maris	11							Ret			**0**	**NC**
**2019 - 2020**	(Italy) EuroInternational	LMP2	(France) Adrien Tambay	11							Ret			**0**	**NC**
				No.	**(Belgium)**; **SPA**	**(Portugal)**; **POR**	**(Italy)**; **MON**	**(France)**; **24H**	**(Bahrain)**; **BHR**	**(Bahrain)**; **BHR**				Points	Pos
**2021**	(Slovakia) ARC Bratislava	LMP2	(Slovakia) Miro Konôpka	44	Ret	11	11							**2**	**11th**
**2021**	(Slovakia) ARC Bratislava	LMP2	(United Kingdom) Tom Jackson	44	Ret	11								**2**	**11th**
**2021**	(Slovakia) ARC Bratislava	LMP2	(United Kingdom) Darren Burke	44	Ret									**2**	**11th**
**2021**	(Slovakia) ARC Bratislava	LMP2	(United Kingdom) Oliver Webb	44		11	11							**2**	**11th**

== Complete European Le Mans Series results ==
Results in bold indicate pole position. Results in italics indicate fastest lap.

Year	Entrant	Class	Drivers	No.	1	2	3	4	5	6	Points	Pos
Year	Entrant	Class	Drivers	No.	**(United Kingdom)**; **SIL**	**(Italy)**; **MON**	**(Austria)**; **RBR**	**(France)**; **LEC**	**(Belgium)**; **SPA**	**(Portugal)**; **POR**	Points	Pos
**2017**	(France) Panis Barthez Competition	LMP2	(France) Fabien Barthez	23	9	7	5	4	9	6	**41**	**7th**
**2017**	(France) Panis Barthez Competition	LMP2	(France) Timothé Buret	23	9	7	5	4	9	6	**41**	**7th**
**2017**	(France) Panis Barthez Competition	LMP2	(France) Nathanaël Berthon	23	9		5	4	9	6	**41**	**7th**
**2017**	(Portugal) Algarve Pro Racing	LMP2	(United States) Matt McMurry	25	Ret	Ret	Ret	8	Ret	11	**4.5**	**13th**
**2017**	(Portugal) Algarve Pro Racing	LMP2	(France) Andrea Pizzitola	25	Ret	Ret	Ret	8	Ret	11	**4.5**	**13th**
**2017**	(Portugal) Algarve Pro Racing	LMP2	(Italy) Andrea Roda	25	Ret	Ret	Ret	8	Ret		**4.5**	**13th**
**2017**	(France) IDEC Sport Racing	LMP2	(France) Patrice Lafargue	28	8	9	Ret	11	10	10	**8.5**	**12th**
**2017**	(France) IDEC Sport Racing	LMP2	(France) Paul Lafargue	28	8	9	Ret	11	10	10	**8.5**	**12th**
**2017**	(France) IDEC Sport Racing	LMP2	(France) David Zollinger	28	8						**8.5**	**12th**
**2017**	(France) IDEC Sport Racing	LMP2	(France) Olivier Pla	28		9	Ret	11			**8.5**	**12th**
**2017**	(France) IDEC Sport Racing	LMP2	(France) Paul-Loup Chatin	28					10	10	**8.5**	**12th**
**2017**	(United States) United Autosports	LMP2	(Portugal) Filipe Albuquerque	32	1	6	1	5	4	2	**98**	**2nd**
**2017**	(United States) United Autosports	LMP2	(United States) William Owen	32	1	6	1	5	4	2	**98**	**2nd**
**2017**	(United States) United Autosports	LMP2	(Switzerland) Hugo de Sadeleer	32	1	6	1	5	4	2	**98**	**2nd**
**2017**	(United Kingdom) Tockwith Motorsports	LMP2	(United Kingdom) Philip Hanson	34	5	11	9				**12.5**	**10th**
**2017**	(United Kingdom) Tockwith Motorsports	LMP2	(United Kingdom) Nigel Moore	34	5	11	9				**12.5**	**10th**
					**(France)**; **LEC**	**(Italy)**; **MON**	**(Austria)**; **RBR**	**(United Kingdom)**; **SIL**	**(Belgium)**; **SPA**	**(Portugal)**; **POR**	Points	Pos
**2018**	(United States) United Autosports	LMP2	(United Kingdom) Philip Hanson	22	12	10	3	Ret	1	1	**54**	**4th**
**2018**	(United States) United Autosports	LMP2	(Brazil) Bruno Senna	22	12						**54**	**4th**
**2018**	(United States) United Autosports	LMP2	(Portugal) Filipe Albuquerque	22		10	3	Ret	1	1	**54**	**4th**
**2018**	(United States) United Autosports	LMP2	(United Kingdom) Wayne Boyd	32	9	11	15	10	6	3	**23**	**10th**
**2018**	(United States) United Autosports	LMP2	(United States) William Owen	32	9	11	15	10	6	3	**23**	**10th**
**2018**	(United States) United Autosports	LMP2	(Switzerland) Hugo de Sadeleer	32	9	11	15	10	6	3	**23**	**10th**
**2018**	(France) Panis Barthez Competition	LMP2	(France) Timothé Buret	23	8	7	10	6	3	2	**45.5**	**6th**
**2018**	(France) Panis Barthez Competition	LMP2	(France) Julien Canal	23	8	7	10	6	3	2	**45.5**	**6th**
**2018**	(France) Panis Barthez Competition	LMP2	(United Kingdom) Will Stevens	23	8	7	10	6	3	2	**45.5**	**6th**
**2018**	(Portugal) Algarve Pro Racing	LMP2	(South Korea) Tacksung Kim	25	16	13	17	11	13	10	**3.25**	**18th**
**2018**	(Portugal) Algarve Pro Racing	LMP2	(United States) Mark Patterson	25	16	13	17	11	13	10	**3.25**	**18th**
**2018**	(Portugal) Algarve Pro Racing	LMP2	(Netherlands) Ate De Jong	25	16	13	17	11		10	**3.25**	**18th**
**2018**	(Portugal) Algarve Pro Racing	LMP2	(United States) Matt McMurry	25					13		**3.25**	**18th**
**2018**	(France) IDEC Sport Racing	LMP2	(France) Patrice Lafargue	27	Ret	12	16				**1.25**	**19th**
**2018**	(France) IDEC Sport Racing	LMP2	(France) Erik Maris	27	Ret	12	16		14		**1.25**	**19th**
**2018**	(France) IDEC Sport Racing	LMP2	(France) William Cavailhes	27	Ret	12					**1.25**	**19th**
**2018**	(France) IDEC Sport Racing	LMP2	(France) Nicolas Minassian	27			16		14		**1.25**	**19th**
**2018**	(France) IDEC Sport Racing	LMP2	(France) Aurélien Panis	27					14		**1.25**	**19th**
					**(France)**; **LEC**	**(Italy)**; **MON**	**(Spain)**; **CAT**	**(United Kingdom)**; **SIL**	**(Belgium)**; **SPA**	**(Portugal)**; **POR**	Points	Pos
**2019**	(United States) United Autosports	LMP2	(United Kingdom) Philip Hanson	22	6	4	7	Ret			**71**	**4th**
**2019**	(United States) United Autosports	LMP2	(United Kingdom) Paul di Resta	22	6						**71**	**4th**
**2019**	(United States) United Autosports	LMP2	(Portugal) Filipe Albuquerque	22		4	7	Ret			**71**	**4th**
**2019**	(United States) United Autosports	LMP2	(United Kingdom) Alex Brundle	32	12	3	8	8			**37.5**	**8th**
**2019**	(United States) United Autosports	LMP2	(Republic of Ireland) Ryan Cullen	32	12	3	8	8			**37.5**	**8th**
**2019**	(United States) United Autosports	LMP2	(United States) William Owen	32		3	8	8			**37.5**	**8th**
**2019**	(France) Panis Barthez Competition	LMP2	(Austria) René Binder	23	10	9	15	7			**19.5**	**11th**
**2019**	(France) Panis Barthez Competition	LMP2	(France) Julien Canal	23	10	9	15	7			**19.5**	**11th**
**2019**	(France) Panis Barthez Competition	LMP2	(United Kingdom) Will Stevens	23	10	9	15	7			**19.5**	**11th**
**2019**	(France) Panis Barthez Competition	LMP2	(France) Timothé Buret	24	Ret	7	Ret	5	Ret	8	**20**	**10th**
**2019**	(France) Panis Barthez Competition	LMP2	(Russia) Konstantin Tereshchenko	24	Ret	7	Ret	5	Ret	8	**20**	**10th**
**2019**	(France) Panis Barthez Competition	LMP2	(Netherlands) Leonard Hoogenboom	24	Ret	7	Ret				**20**	**10th**
**2019**	(France) IDEC Sport Racing	LMP2	(France) Stéphane Adler	27	Ret	16	14	13	Ret	13	**2**	**18th**
**2019**	(France) IDEC Sport Racing	LMP2	(France) Erik Maris	27	Ret	16			Ret		**2**	**18th**
**2019**	(France) IDEC Sport Racing	LMP2	(France) Patrice Lafargue	27	Ret	16		13		13	**2**	**18th**
**2019**	(France) IDEC Sport Racing	LMP2	(France) William Cavailhes	27			14	13	Ret	13	**2**	**18th**
**2019**	(Poland) Inter Europol Competition	LMP2	(Spain) Dani Clos	34	15	13	Ret				**2**	**17th**
**2019**	(Poland) Inter Europol Competition	LMP2	(France) Léo Roussel	34	15						**2**	**17th**
**2019**	(Poland) Inter Europol Competition	LMP2	(Poland) Jakub Śmiechowski	34	15	13	Ret	12	12	Ret	**2**	**17th**
**2019**	(Poland) Inter Europol Competition	LMP2	(France) Adrien Tambay	34			Ret	12			**2**	**17th**
**2019**	(Poland) Inter Europol Competition	LMP2	(Austria) Lukas Dunner	34				12			**2**	**17th**
**2019**	(Poland) Inter Europol Competition	LMP2	(Belgium) Sam Dejonghe	34					12	Ret	**2**	**17th**
**2019**	(Poland) Inter Europol Competition	LMP2	(Switzerland) Mathias Beche	34					12	Ret	**2**	**17th**
					**(France)**; **LEC**	**(Belgium)**; **SPA**	**(France)**; **LEC**	**(Italy)**; **MON**	**(Portugal)**; **POR**		Points	Pos
**2020**	(Poland) Inter Europol Competition	LMP2	(Austria) René Binder	34	7	11	6	12	Ret		**15.5**	**12th**
**2020**	(Poland) Inter Europol Competition	LMP2	(Russia) Matevos Isaakyan	34	7	11	6	12	Ret		**15.5**	**12th**
**2020**	(Poland) Inter Europol Competition	LMP2	(Poland) Jakub Śmiechowski	34	7	11	6	12	Ret		**15.5**	**12th**

== Complete Asian Le Mans Series results ==
Results in bold indicate pole position. Results in italics indicate fastest lap.

Year	Entrant	Class	Drivers	No.	1	2	3	4	Points	Pos
Year	Entrant	Class	Drivers	No.	**(China)**; **SHA**	**(Australia)**; **BEN**	**(Malaysia)**; **SEP**	**(Thailand)**; **CHA**	Points	Pos
**2019 - 2020**	(Philippines) Eurasia Motorsport	LMP2	(New Zealand) Daniel Gaunt	1	Ret	Ret	Ret	4	**13**	**7th**
**2019 - 2020**	(Philippines) Eurasia Motorsport	LMP2	(Japan) Nobuya Yamanaka	1	Ret			4	**13**	**7th**
**2019 - 2020**	(Philippines) Eurasia Motorsport	LMP2	(Japan) Masataka Yanagida	1	Ret		Ret		**13**	**7th**
**2019 - 2020**	(Philippines) Eurasia Motorsport	LMP2	(New Zealand) Nick Cassidy	1		Ret	Ret	4	**13**	**7th**
**2019 - 2020**	(Philippines) Eurasia Motorsport	LMP2	(New Zealand) Shane van Gisbergen	1		Ret			**13**	**7th**
**2019 - 2020**	(Philippines) Eurasia Motorsport	LMP2	(Australia) Nick Foster	36	2	2	2	5	**65**	**3rd**
**2019 - 2020**	(Philippines) Eurasia Motorsport	LMP2	(Spain) Roberto Merhi	36	2	2	2	5	**65**	**3rd**
**2019 - 2020**	(Philippines) Eurasia Motorsport	LMP2	(Australia) Aidan Read	36	2	2	2	5	**65**	**3rd**
**2019 - 2020**	(Poland) Inter Europol Competition	LMP2	(Australia) John Corbett	33	5	4	6	6	**38**	**4th**
**2019 - 2020**	(Poland) Inter Europol Competition	LMP2	(Australia) Nathan Kumar	33	5	4	6	6	**38**	**4th**
**2019 - 2020**	(Poland) Inter Europol Competition	LMP2	(Australia) Mitchell Neilson	33	5	4			**38**	**4th**
**2019 - 2020**	(Poland) Inter Europol Competition	LMP2	(Singapore) Danial Frost	33			6	6	**38**	**4th**
**2019 - 2020**	(Poland) Inter Europol Competition	LMP2	(Switzerland) Mathias Beche	34	4	Ret	5	7	**28**	**5th**
**2019 - 2020**	(Poland) Inter Europol Competition	LMP2	(Poland) Jakub Śmiechowski	34	4	Ret	5	7	**28**	**5th**
**2019 - 2020**	(Poland) Inter Europol Competition	LMP2	(United Kingdom) James Winslow	34	4	Ret	5	7	**28**	**5th**
					**(United Arab Emirates)**; **DUB 1**	**(United Arab Emirates)**; **DUB 2**	**(United Arab Emirates)**; **YMC 1**	**(United Arab Emirates)**; **YMC 2**	Points	Pos
**2021**	(Italy) EuroInternational - Ojets	LMP2 - Am	(Australia) John Corbett	11	2	Ret			**18**	**2nd**
**2021**	(Italy) EuroInternational - Ojets	LMP2 - Am	(Australia) Neale Muston	11	2	Ret			**18**	**2nd**
					**(United Arab Emirates)**; **DUB 1**	**(United Arab Emirates)**; **DUB 2**	**(United Arab Emirates)**; **YMC 1**	**(United Arab Emirates)**; **YMC 2**	Points	Pos
**2022**	(Slovakia) ARC Bratislava	LMP2 LMP2 Am	(Slovakia) Miro Konôpka	44	4	4	5	4	**51**	**4th**
**2022**	(Slovakia) ARC Bratislava	LMP2 LMP2 Am	(Australia) Neale Muston	44	4	4	5	4		
**2022**	(Slovakia) ARC Bratislava	LMP2 LMP2 Am	(Australia) John Corbett	44	4	4	5	4	**63**	**3rd**

== Complete IMSA SportsCar Championship results ==
Results in bold indicate pole position. Results in italics indicate fastest lap.

Year	Entrant	Class	Drivers	No.	1	2	3	4	5	6	7	8	9	10	11	Points	Pos
Year	Entrant	Class	Drivers	No.	**(United States)**; **DAY**	**(United States)**; **SEB**	**(United States)**; **LBH**	**(United States)**; **AUS**	**(United States)**; **BEL**	**(United States)**; **WGL**	**(Canada)**; **MOS**	**(United States)**; **ELK**	**(United States)**; **LGA**	**(United States)**; **ATL**		Points	Pos
**2017**	(United States) PR1/Mathiasen Motorsports	P	(United Kingdom) Tom Kimber-Smith	52	9	7	5									**237**	**7th**
**2017**	(United States) PR1/Mathiasen Motorsports	P	(Mexico) José Gutiérrez	52	9	7		9		4		7	7	10		**237**	**7th**
**2017**	(United States) PR1/Mathiasen Motorsports	P	(United States) Mike Guasch	52	9	7										**237**	**7th**
**2017**	(United States) PR1/Mathiasen Motorsports	P	(United States) R. C. Enerson	52	9											**237**	**7th**
**2017**	(United States) PR1/Mathiasen Motorsports	P	(United States) Will Owen	52			5									**237**	**7th**
**2017**	(United States) PR1/Mathiasen Motorsports	P	(Italy) Marco Bonanomi	52				9								**237**	**7th**
**2017**	(United States) PR1/Mathiasen Motorsports	P	(United States) Kenton Koch	52					10							**237**	**7th**
**2017**	(United States) PR1/Mathiasen Motorsports	P	(United Kingdom) Ryan Lewis	52					10							**237**	**7th**
**2017**	(United States) PR1/Mathiasen Motorsports	P	(France) Olivier Pla	52						4		7	7	10		**237**	**7th**
**2017**	(United States) PR1/Mathiasen Motorsports	P	(United States) Nicholas Boulle	52							8					**237**	**7th**
**2017**	(United States) PR1/Mathiasen Motorsports	P	(Canada) David Ostella	52							8					**237**	**7th**
**2017**	(United States) PR1/Mathiasen Motorsports	P	(France) Julien Canal	52										10		**237**	**7th**
**2017**	(United States) VisitFlorida Racing	P	(Belgium) Marc Goossens	90								5	1	7		**233**	**8th**
**2017**	(United States) VisitFlorida Racing	P	(Netherlands) Renger van der Zande	90								5	1	7		**233**	**8th**
**2017**	(United States) VisitFlorida Racing	P	(Germany) René Rast	90												**233**	**8th**
**2017**	(United States) VisitFlorida Racing	P	(United States) Jonathan Bomarito	90										7		**233**	**8th**
					**(United States)**; **DAY**	**(United States)**; **SEB**	**(United States)**; **LBH**	**(United States)**; **MOH**	**(United States)**; **BEL**	**(United States)**; **WGL**	**(Canada)**; **MOS**	**(United States)**; **ELK**	**(United States)**; **LGA**	**(United States)**; **ATL**		Points	Pos
**2018**	(United States) United Autosports	P	(Spain) Fernando Alonso	23	13											**18**	**19th**
**2018**	(United States) United Autosports	P	(United Kingdom) Philip Hanson	23	13											**18**	**19th**
**2018**	(United States) United Autosports	P	(United Kingdom) Lando Norris	23	13											**18**	**19th**
**2018**	(United States) United Autosports	P	(United Kingdom) Paul di Resta	32	4	5				4						**82**	**15th**
**2018**	(United States) United Autosports	P	(Brazil) Bruno Senna	32						4						**82**	**15th**
**2018**	(United States) United Autosports	P	(United States) Will Owen	32	4											**82**	**15th**
**2018**	(United States) United Autosports	P	(Switzerland) Hugo de Sadeleer	32	4											**82**	**15th**
**2018**	(United States) United Autosports	P	(United Kingdom) Philip Hanson	32		5				4						**82**	**15th**
**2018**	(United States) United Autosports	P	(United Kingdom) Alex Brundle	32		5										**82**	**15th**
**2018**	(United States) AFS/PR1 Mathiasen Motorsports	P	(Colombia) Sebastián Saavedra	52	12	11	11	6	8	9	9	13				**211**	**12th**
**2018**	(United States) AFS/PR1 Mathiasen Motorsports	P	(Colombia) Gustavo Yacamán	52	12	11	11	6	8	9	9	13				**211**	**12th**
**2018**	(United States) AFS/PR1 Mathiasen Motorsports	P	(Mexico) Roberto González	52	12	11										**211**	**12th**
**2018**	(United States) AFS/PR1 Mathiasen Motorsports	P	(United States) Nicholas Boulle	52	12											**211**	**12th**
**2018**	(United States) AFS/PR1 Mathiasen Motorsports	P	(Mexico) José Gutiérrez	52												**211**	**12th**
**2018**	(United States) AFS/PR1 Mathiasen Motorsports	P	(United States) Will Owen	52						9						**211**	**12th**
					**(United States)**; **DAY 1**	**(United States)**; **DAY 2**	**(United States)**; **SEB**	**(United States)**; **MOH**	**(United States)**; **BEL**	**(United States)**; **WGL 1**	**(United States)**; **WGL 2**	**(United States)**; **ELK**	**(United States)**; **LGA**	**(United States)**; **LBH**	**(United States)**; **ATL**	Points	Pos
**2021**	(Philippines) RWR Eurasia	LMP2	(United States) Austin Dillon	51		4										**0**	**NC**
**2021**	(Philippines) RWR Eurasia	LMP2	(Germany) Sven Müller	51		4										**0**	**NC**
**2021**	(Philippines) RWR Eurasia	LMP2	(United States) Cody Ware	51	8	4										**0**	**NC**
**2021**	(Philippines) RWR Eurasia	LMP2	(Turkey) Salih Yoluç	51	8	4										**0**	**NC**
					**(United States)**; **DAY**	**(United States)**; **SEB**	**(United States)**; **WGL**	**(Canada)**; **MOS**	**(United States)**; **ELK**	**(United States)**; **IMS**	**(United States)**; **ATL**					Points	Pos
**2024**	(United States) Sean Creech Motorsport	LMP2	(Portugal) João Barbosa	33	9	4	11	10	8							1240	11th
**2024**	(United States) Sean Creech Motorsport	LMP2	(United States) Lance Willse	33	9	4	11	10								1240	11th
**2024**	(United States) Sean Creech Motorsport	LMP2	(United Kingdom) Jonny Edgar	33	9	4	11									1240	11th
**2024**	(United States) Sean Creech Motorsport	LMP2	(United States) Nolan Siegel	33	9											1240	11th
**2024**	(United States) Sean Creech Motorsport	LMP2	(Estonia) Tõnis Kasemets	33					8							1240	11th

== Race Victories ==
Year	Series	Race	Circuit	Team	Specification
2017	ELMS	4 Hours of Silverstone	(United Kingdom) Silverstone Circuit	(United States) United Autosports	LMP2
2017	ELMS	4 Hours of Red Bull Ring	(Austria) Red Bull Ring	(United States) United Autosports	LMP2
2017	IMSA	Continental Tire Road Race Showcase	(United States) Road America	(United States) Tequila Patron ESM	Nissan DPi
2017	IMSA	America's Tire 250	(United States) Mazda Raceway Laguna Seca	(United States) VisitFlorida Racing	LMP2
2017	IMSA	Motul Petit Le Mans	(United States) Road Atlanta	(United States) Tequila Patron ESM	Nissan DPi
2018	IMSA	Mobil 1 Twelve Hours of Sebring	(United States) Sebring International Raceway	(United States) Tequila Patron ESM	Nissan DPi
2018	IMSA	Continental Tire Monterey Grand Prix	(United States) WeatherTech Raceway Laguna Seca	(United States) Tequila Patron ESM	Nissan DPi
2018	ELMS	4 Hours of Spa	(Belgium) Circuit de Spa-Francorchamps	(United States) United Autosports	LMP2
2018	ELMS	4 Hours of Portimao	(Portugal) Algarve International Circuit	(United States) United Autosports	LMP2
2022	ESET Cup	GT Sprint Race 1	Slovakia Ring	(Slovakia) ARC Bratislava	LMP2
2022	ESET Cup	GT Sprint Race 2	Slovakia Ring	(Slovakia) ARC Bratislava	LMP2
