= 2018–19 FIA World Endurance Championship =

Auto racing series

- Organizer: Fédération Internationale de l'Automobile; Automobile Club de l'Ouest
- Discipline: Sports car endurance racing
- Races: 8

Champions
- LMP1 Team: (Japan) Toyota Gazoo Racing
- GTE Manufacturer: (Germany) Porsche
- LMP2 Team: (France) Signatech Alpine Matmut
- LMGTE Am Team: (Germany) Team Project 1

FIA World Endurance Championship
- ← 2017 2019–20 →

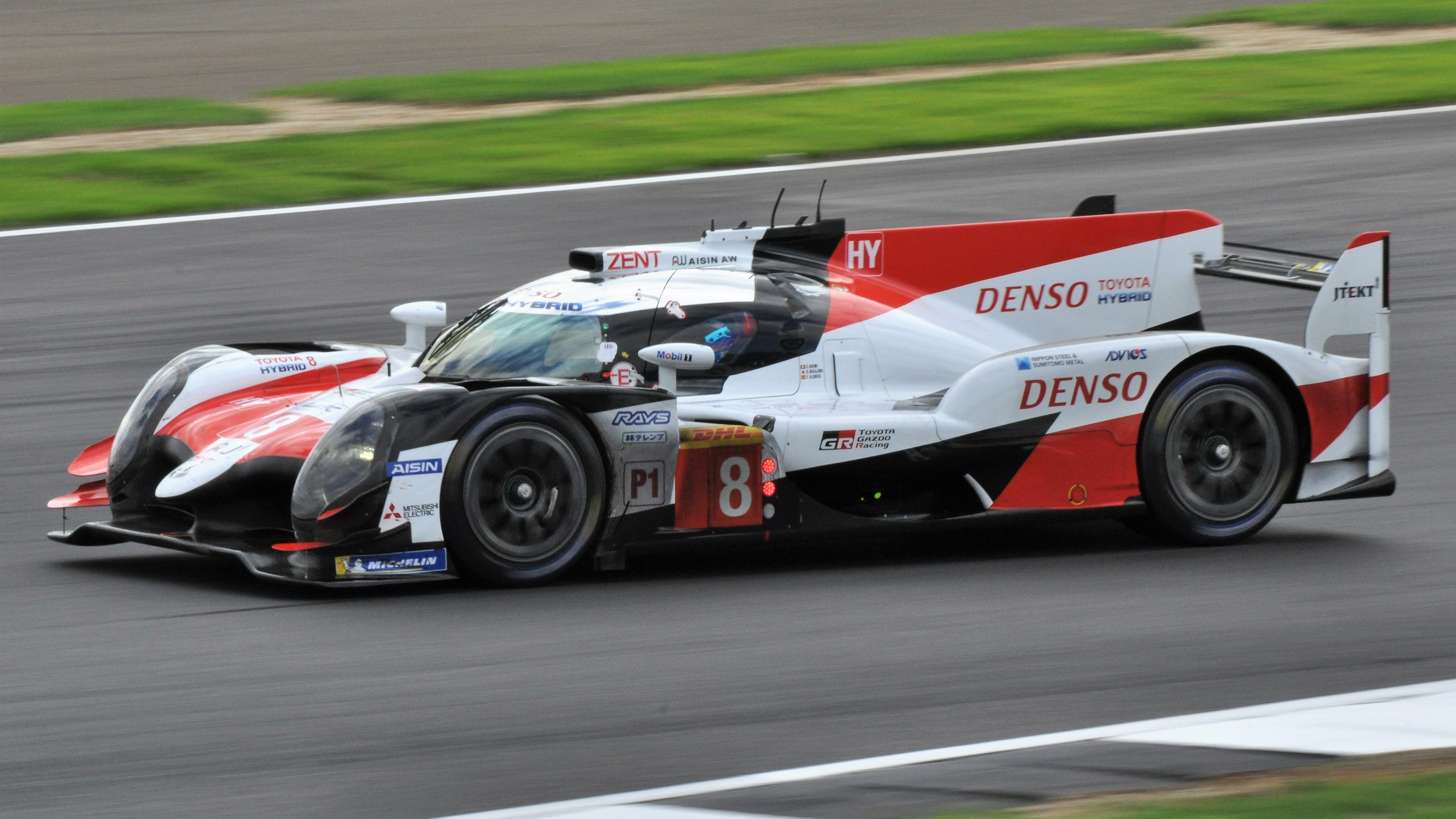
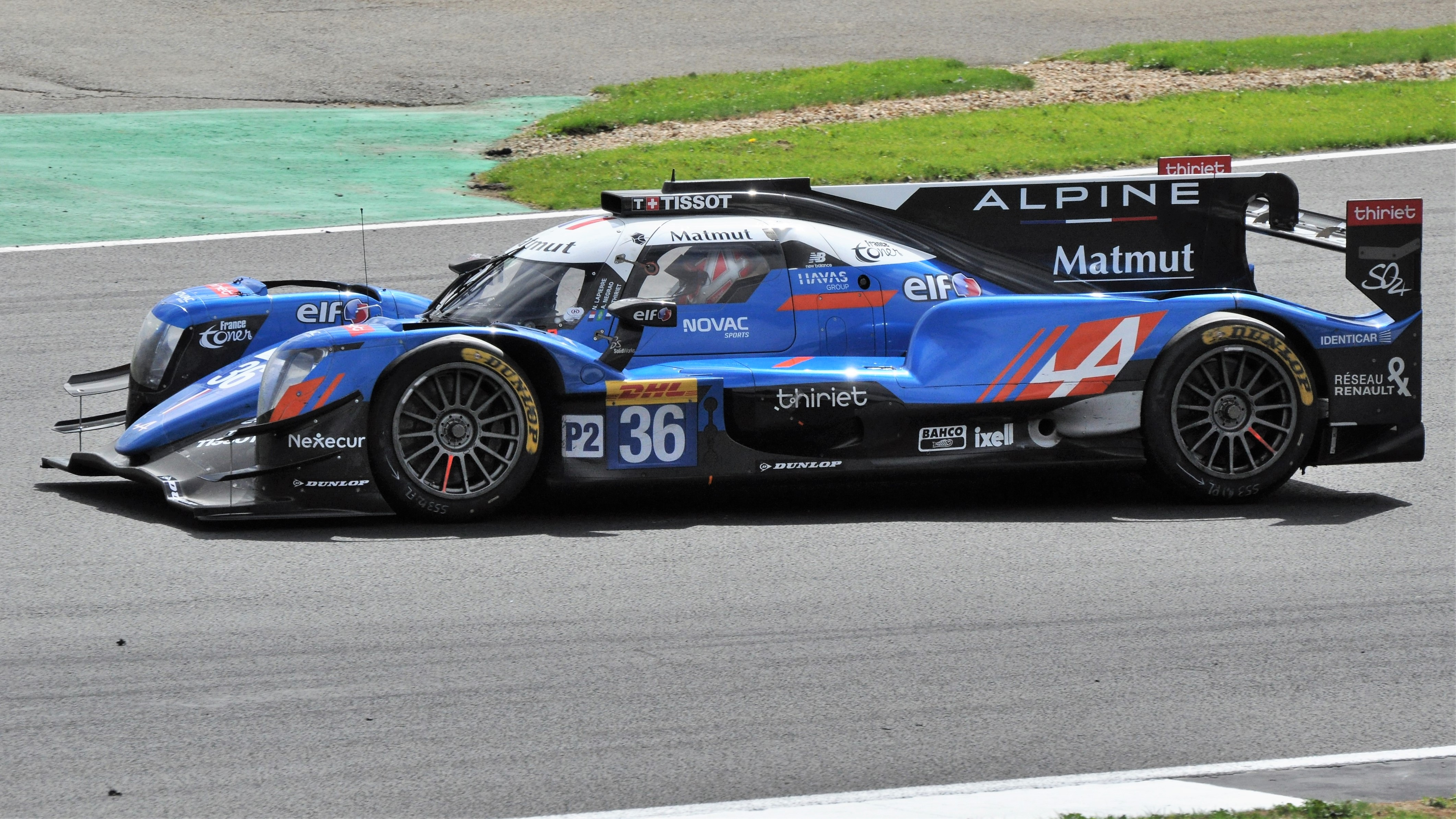
Toyota Gazoo Racing and their No. 8 car are the LMP1 team champions and the World Endurance LMP Drivers' champions, respectively. Signatech Alpine Matmut are the LMP2 Endurance Trophy champions.

The 2018–19 FIA World Endurance Championship was the seventh season of the FIA World Endurance Championship, an auto racing series co-organised by the Fédération Internationale de l'Automobile (FIA) and the Automobile Club de l'Ouest (ACO). The series is open to Le Mans Prototypes and grand tourer-style racing cars divided into four categories. The season marked the first move to a winter schedule for the championship, with the season starting at the Circuit de Spa-Francorchamps in May 2018 and concluding at the 24 Hours of Le Mans in June 2019. World championship titles were awarded for LMP drivers, GTE drivers, LMP1 teams and GTE manufacturers.

== Schedule ==
The series announced a provisional schedule on 1 September 2017 that shifted the season calendar from a spring to autumn layout with the 24 Hours of Le Mans marque event held in the middle of the championship, to one running from the May 2018 and to June 2019, including two runnings of Le Mans. This "super season" of eight races spans across more than a year instead of the usual eight months. This shift in calendar length would allow the following 2019–20 season to return to a shorter length by starting in the autumn and concluding at Le Mans in the summer.

The schedule did not include the Circuit of the Americas, Bahrain, Mexico City, or the Nürburgring which were all part of the 2017 championship. In addition to Le Mans being included in both 2018 and 2019, the 6 Hours of Spa-Francorchamps is also run twice. Sebring International Raceway returned to the series for the first time since the inaugural season in 2012, although the WEC does not participate in the WeatherTech SportsCar Championship's 12 Hours of Sebring. The WeatherTech series ran their race the day after WEC's 8-hour, 1,000-mile event.

The schedule was revised two weeks later with the announcement of the eighth round of the championship, returning to Silverstone Circuit in the United Kingdom. The unannounced event was originally planned for February 2019, with negotiations taking place over a return to Mexico City. With the Mexico City deal failing to materialize, the event at Silverstone was moved to August 2018 to bridge the gap between Le Mans and the Asian rounds of the series starting in October. Further, the Fuji and Shanghai rounds had their dates changed, however Fuji was later returned to its originally scheduled date.

Rnd	Race	Circuit	Location	Date
	Prologue	Circuit Paul Ricard	(France) Le Castellet, Var	6/7 April 2018
1	6 Hours of Spa-Francorchamps	Circuit de Spa-Francorchamps	(Belgium) Stavelot	5 May 2018
2	24 Hours of Le Mans	Circuit de la Sarthe	(France) Le Mans	16–17 June 2018
3	6 Hours of Silverstone	Silverstone Circuit	(United Kingdom) Silverstone	19 August 2018
4	6 Hours of Fuji	Fuji Speedway	(Japan) Oyama, Shizuoka	14 October 2018
5	6 Hours of Shanghai	Shanghai International Circuit	(China) Shanghai	18 November 2018
6	1000 Miles of Sebring	Sebring International Raceway	(United States) Sebring, Florida	15 March 2019
7	6 Hours of Spa-Francorchamps	Circuit de Spa-Francorchamps	(Belgium) Stavelot	4 May 2019
8	24 Hours of Le Mans	Circuit de la Sarthe	(France) Le Mans	15–16 June 2019

== Teams and drivers ==
=== LMP1 ===
Entrant	Car	Engine	Hybrid	Tyre	No.	Drivers	Rounds
(Switzerland) Rebellion Racing	Rebellion R13	Gibson GL458 4.5 L V8		M	1	(Germany) André Lotterer	1–5, 7–8
(Switzerland) Rebellion Racing	Rebellion R13	Gibson GL458 4.5 L V8		M	1	(Switzerland) Neel Jani	All
(Switzerland) Rebellion Racing	Rebellion R13	Gibson GL458 4.5 L V8		M	1	(Brazil) Bruno Senna	All
(Switzerland) Rebellion Racing	Rebellion R13	Gibson GL458 4.5 L V8		M	1	(Switzerland) Mathias Beche	6
(Switzerland) Rebellion Racing	Rebellion R13	Gibson GL458 4.5 L V8		M	3	(France) Thomas Laurent	All
(Switzerland) Rebellion Racing	Rebellion R13	Gibson GL458 4.5 L V8		M	3	(United States) Gustavo Menezes	All
(Switzerland) Rebellion Racing	Rebellion R13	Gibson GL458 4.5 L V8		M	3	(Switzerland) Mathias Beche	1–5
(Switzerland) Rebellion Racing	Rebellion R13	Gibson GL458 4.5 L V8		M	3	(France) Nathanaël Berthon	6–8
(Austria) ByKolles Racing Team	ENSO CLM P1/01	Nismo VRX30A 3.0 L Turbo V6; Gibson GL458 4.5 L V8		M	4	(United Kingdom) Oliver Webb	1–5, 7–8
(Austria) ByKolles Racing Team	ENSO CLM P1/01	Nismo VRX30A 3.0 L Turbo V6; Gibson GL458 4.5 L V8		M	4	(France) Tom Dillmann	1–2, 4–5, 7–8
(Austria) ByKolles Racing Team	ENSO CLM P1/01	Nismo VRX30A 3.0 L Turbo V6; Gibson GL458 4.5 L V8		M	4	(Austria) Dominik Kraihamer	1–2
(Austria) ByKolles Racing Team	ENSO CLM P1/01	Nismo VRX30A 3.0 L Turbo V6; Gibson GL458 4.5 L V8		M	4	(Austria) René Binder	3
(Austria) ByKolles Racing Team	ENSO CLM P1/01	Nismo VRX30A 3.0 L Turbo V6; Gibson GL458 4.5 L V8		M	4	(United Kingdom) James Rossiter	4–5
(Austria) ByKolles Racing Team	ENSO CLM P1/01	Nismo VRX30A 3.0 L Turbo V6; Gibson GL458 4.5 L V8		M	4	(Italy) Paolo Ruberti	7–8
(China) CEFC TRSM Racing	Ginetta G60-LT-P1	Mecachrome V634P1 3.4 L Turbo V6		M	5	(United Kingdom) Charlie Robertson	1–2
(China) CEFC TRSM Racing	Ginetta G60-LT-P1	Mecachrome V634P1 3.4 L Turbo V6		M	5	(United Kingdom) Dean Stoneman	1
(China) CEFC TRSM Racing	Ginetta G60-LT-P1	Mecachrome V634P1 3.4 L Turbo V6		M	5	(France) Léo Roussel	2
(China) CEFC TRSM Racing	Ginetta G60-LT-P1	Mecachrome V634P1 3.4 L Turbo V6		M	5	(United Kingdom) Mike Simpson	2
(China) CEFC TRSM Racing	Ginetta G60-LT-P1	Mecachrome V634P1 3.4 L Turbo V6		M	6	(United Kingdom) Oliver Rowland	1–2
(China) CEFC TRSM Racing	Ginetta G60-LT-P1	Mecachrome V634P1 3.4 L Turbo V6		M	6	(United Kingdom) Alex Brundle	1–2
(China) CEFC TRSM Racing	Ginetta G60-LT-P1	Mecachrome V634P1 3.4 L Turbo V6		M	6	(United Kingdom) Oliver Turvey	1–2
(Japan) Toyota Gazoo Racing	Toyota TS050 Hybrid	Toyota H8909 2.4 L Turbo V6	Hybrid	M	7	(United Kingdom) Mike Conway	All
(Japan) Toyota Gazoo Racing	Toyota TS050 Hybrid	Toyota H8909 2.4 L Turbo V6	Hybrid	M	7	(Japan) Kamui Kobayashi	All
(Japan) Toyota Gazoo Racing	Toyota TS050 Hybrid	Toyota H8909 2.4 L Turbo V6	Hybrid	M	7	(Argentina) José María López	All
(Japan) Toyota Gazoo Racing	Toyota TS050 Hybrid	Toyota H8909 2.4 L Turbo V6	Hybrid	M	8	(Spain) Fernando Alonso	All
(Japan) Toyota Gazoo Racing	Toyota TS050 Hybrid	Toyota H8909 2.4 L Turbo V6	Hybrid	M	8	(Switzerland) Sébastien Buemi	All
(Japan) Toyota Gazoo Racing	Toyota TS050 Hybrid	Toyota H8909 2.4 L Turbo V6	Hybrid	M	8	(Japan) Kazuki Nakajima	All
(United States) DragonSpeed	BR Engineering BR1	Gibson GL458 4.5 L V8		M	10	(United Kingdom) Ben Hanley	1–6, 8
(United States) DragonSpeed	BR Engineering BR1	Gibson GL458 4.5 L V8		M	10	(Sweden) Henrik Hedman	1–3, 6, 8
(United States) DragonSpeed	BR Engineering BR1	Gibson GL458 4.5 L V8		M	10	(Brazil) Pietro Fittipaldi	1
(United States) DragonSpeed	BR Engineering BR1	Gibson GL458 4.5 L V8		M	10	(Netherlands) Renger van der Zande	2–3, 5–6, 8
(United States) DragonSpeed	BR Engineering BR1	Gibson GL458 4.5 L V8		M	10	(Australia) James Allen	4–5
(Russia) SMP Racing	BR Engineering BR1	AER P60B 2.4 L Turbo V6		M	11	(Russia) Mikhail Aleshin	All
(Russia) SMP Racing	BR Engineering BR1	AER P60B 2.4 L Turbo V6		M	11	(Russia) Vitaly Petrov	All
(Russia) SMP Racing	BR Engineering BR1	AER P60B 2.4 L Turbo V6		M	11	(United Kingdom) Jenson Button	2–5
(Russia) SMP Racing	BR Engineering BR1	AER P60B 2.4 L Turbo V6		M	11	(New Zealand) Brendon Hartley	6
(Russia) SMP Racing	BR Engineering BR1	AER P60B 2.4 L Turbo V6		M	11	(Belgium) Stoffel Vandoorne	7–8
(Russia) SMP Racing	BR Engineering BR1	AER P60B 2.4 L Turbo V6		M	17	(France) Stéphane Sarrazin	All
(Russia) SMP Racing	BR Engineering BR1	AER P60B 2.4 L Turbo V6		M	17	(Russia) Egor Orudzhev	All
(Russia) SMP Racing	BR Engineering BR1	AER P60B 2.4 L Turbo V6		M	17	(Russia) Matevos Isaakyan	1–2, 4–5
(Russia) SMP Racing	BR Engineering BR1	AER P60B 2.4 L Turbo V6		M	17	(Russia) Sergey Sirotkin	6–8

=== LMP2 ===
In accordance with the Le Mans Prototype LMP2 regulations for 2017, all cars used the Gibson GK428 4.2 L V8 engine.

Entrant	Car	Tyre	No.	Drivers	Rounds
(France) TDS Racing	Oreca 07	D	28	(France) François Perrodo	All
(France) TDS Racing	Oreca 07	D	28	(France) Matthieu Vaxivière	All
(France) TDS Racing	Oreca 07	D	28	(France) Loïc Duval	1–3, 5–6, 8
(France) TDS Racing	Oreca 07	D	28	(France) Jean-Éric Vergne	4
(France) TDS Racing	Oreca 07	D	28	(France) Norman Nato	7
(Netherlands) Racing Team Nederland	Dallara P217	M	29	(Netherlands) Giedo van der Garde	All
(Netherlands) Racing Team Nederland	Dallara P217	M	29	(Netherlands) Frits van Eerd	All
(Netherlands) Racing Team Nederland	Dallara P217	M	29	(Netherlands) Jan Lammers	1–2
(Netherlands) Racing Team Nederland	Dallara P217	M	29	(Netherlands) Nyck de Vries	3–8
(United States) DragonSpeed	Oreca 07	M	31	(Mexico) Roberto González	All
(United States) DragonSpeed	Oreca 07	M	31	(Venezuela) Pastor Maldonado	All
(United States) DragonSpeed	Oreca 07	M	31	(France) Nathanaël Berthon	1–2
(United States) DragonSpeed	Oreca 07	M	31	(United Kingdom) Anthony Davidson	3–8
(France) Signatech Alpine Matmut	Alpine A470	D M	36	(France) Nicolas Lapierre	All
(France) Signatech Alpine Matmut	Alpine A470	D M	36	(Brazil) André Negrão	All
(France) Signatech Alpine Matmut	Alpine A470	D M	36	(France) Pierre Thiriet	All
(China) Jackie Chan DC Racing	Oreca 07	D	37	(Malaysia) Jazeman Jaafar	1–5
(China) Jackie Chan DC Racing	Oreca 07	D	37	(Malaysia) Weiron Tan	1–5
(China) Jackie Chan DC Racing	Oreca 07	D	37	(Malaysia) Nabil Jeffri	1–5
(China) Jackie Chan DC Racing	Oreca 07	D	37	(Denmark) David Heinemeier Hansson	6–8
(China) Jackie Chan DC Racing	Oreca 07	D	37	(United Kingdom) Jordan King	6–8
(China) Jackie Chan DC Racing	Oreca 07	D	37	(United Kingdom) Will Stevens	6–7
(China) Jackie Chan DC Racing	Oreca 07	D	37	(United States) Ricky Taylor	8
(China) Jackie Chan DC Racing	Oreca 07	D	38	(France) Gabriel Aubry	All
(China) Jackie Chan DC Racing	Oreca 07	D	38	(Monaco) Stéphane Richelmi	All
(China) Jackie Chan DC Racing	Oreca 07	D	38	(China) Ho-Pin Tung	All
(France) Larbre Compétition	Ligier JS P217	M	50	(France) Erwin Creed	All
(France) Larbre Compétition	Ligier JS P217	M	50	(France) Romano Ricci	All
(France) Larbre Compétition	Ligier JS P217	M	50	(France) Julien Canal	1
(France) Larbre Compétition	Ligier JS P217	M	50	(France) Thomas Dagoneau	2
(France) Larbre Compétition	Ligier JS P217	M	50	(Japan) Yoshiharu Mori	3
(France) Larbre Compétition	Ligier JS P217	M	50	(Japan) Keiko Ihara	4
(France) Larbre Compétition	Ligier JS P217	M	50	(France) Enzo Guibbert	5
(France) Larbre Compétition	Ligier JS P217	M	50	(United States) Gunnar Jeannette	6
(France) Larbre Compétition	Ligier JS P217	M	50	(United States) Nicholas Boulle	7–8

- Afiq Yazid was scheduled to compete for Jackie Chan DC Racing's all-Malaysian #37 entry, but did not appear at any rounds.

=== LMGTE Pro ===
Entrant	Car	Engine	Tyre	No.	Drivers	Rounds
(Italy) AF Corse	Ferrari 488 GTE	Ferrari F154CB 4.0 L Turbo V8	M	51	(United Kingdom) James Calado	All
(Italy) AF Corse	Ferrari 488 GTE	Ferrari F154CB 4.0 L Turbo V8	M	51	(Italy) Alessandro Pier Guidi	All
(Italy) AF Corse	Ferrari 488 GTE	Ferrari F154CB 4.0 L Turbo V8	M	51	(Brazil) Daniel Serra	2, 6, 8
(Italy) AF Corse	Ferrari 488 GTE	Ferrari F154CB 4.0 L Turbo V8	M	71	(United Kingdom) Sam Bird	All
(Italy) AF Corse	Ferrari 488 GTE	Ferrari F154CB 4.0 L Turbo V8	M	71	(Italy) Davide Rigon	All
(Italy) AF Corse	Ferrari 488 GTE	Ferrari F154CB 4.0 L Turbo V8	M	71	(Spain) Miguel Molina	2, 6, 8
(United States) Ford Chip Ganassi Team UK	Ford GT	Ford EcoBoost D35 3.5 L Turbo V6	M	66	(Germany) Stefan Mücke	All
(United States) Ford Chip Ganassi Team UK	Ford GT	Ford EcoBoost D35 3.5 L Turbo V6	M	66	(France) Olivier Pla	All
(United States) Ford Chip Ganassi Team UK	Ford GT	Ford EcoBoost D35 3.5 L Turbo V6	M	66	(United States) Billy Johnson	1–2, 6, 8
(United States) Ford Chip Ganassi Team UK	Ford GT	Ford EcoBoost D35 3.5 L Turbo V6	M	67	(United Kingdom) Andy Priaulx	All
(United States) Ford Chip Ganassi Team UK	Ford GT	Ford EcoBoost D35 3.5 L Turbo V6	M	67	(United Kingdom) Harry Tincknell	All
(United States) Ford Chip Ganassi Team UK	Ford GT	Ford EcoBoost D35 3.5 L Turbo V6	M	67	(Brazil) Tony Kanaan	1–2
(United States) Ford Chip Ganassi Team UK	Ford GT	Ford EcoBoost D35 3.5 L Turbo V6	M	67	(United States) Jonathan Bomarito	6, 8
(Germany) BMW Team MTEK	BMW M8 GTE	BMW P63/1 4.0 L Turbo V8	M	81	(Netherlands) Nick Catsburg	All
(Germany) BMW Team MTEK	BMW M8 GTE	BMW P63/1 4.0 L Turbo V8	M	81	(Germany) Martin Tomczyk	All
(Germany) BMW Team MTEK	BMW M8 GTE	BMW P63/1 4.0 L Turbo V8	M	81	(Austria) Philipp Eng	2, 8
(Germany) BMW Team MTEK	BMW M8 GTE	BMW P63/1 4.0 L Turbo V8	M	81	(United Kingdom) Alexander Sims	6
(Germany) BMW Team MTEK	BMW M8 GTE	BMW P63/1 4.0 L Turbo V8	M	82	(Portugal) António Félix da Costa	All
(Germany) BMW Team MTEK	BMW M8 GTE	BMW P63/1 4.0 L Turbo V8	M	82	(United Kingdom) Tom Blomqvist	1, 4–5
(Germany) BMW Team MTEK	BMW M8 GTE	BMW P63/1 4.0 L Turbo V8	M	82	(Brazil) Augusto Farfus	2–3, 6–8
(Germany) BMW Team MTEK	BMW M8 GTE	BMW P63/1 4.0 L Turbo V8	M	82	(United Kingdom) Alexander Sims	2
(Germany) BMW Team MTEK	BMW M8 GTE	BMW P63/1 4.0 L Turbo V8	M	82	(Canada) Bruno Spengler	6
(Germany) BMW Team MTEK	BMW M8 GTE	BMW P63/1 4.0 L Turbo V8	M	82	(Finland) Jesse Krohn	8
(Germany) Porsche GT Team	Porsche 911 RSR	Porsche M97/80 4.0 L Flat-6	M	91	(Italy) Gianmaria Bruni	All
(Germany) Porsche GT Team	Porsche 911 RSR	Porsche M97/80 4.0 L Flat-6	M	91	(Austria) Richard Lietz	All
(Germany) Porsche GT Team	Porsche 911 RSR	Porsche M97/80 4.0 L Flat-6	M	91	(France) Frédéric Makowiecki	2, 8
(Germany) Porsche GT Team	Porsche 911 RSR	Porsche M97/80 4.0 L Flat-6	M	92	(Denmark) Michael Christensen	All
(Germany) Porsche GT Team	Porsche 911 RSR	Porsche M97/80 4.0 L Flat-6	M	92	(France) Kévin Estre	All
(Germany) Porsche GT Team	Porsche 911 RSR	Porsche M97/80 4.0 L Flat-6	M	92	(Belgium) Laurens Vanthoor	2, 8
(United Kingdom) Aston Martin Racing	Aston Martin Vantage AMR	Aston Martin M177 4.0 L Turbo V8	M	95	(Denmark) Marco Sørensen	All
(United Kingdom) Aston Martin Racing	Aston Martin Vantage AMR	Aston Martin M177 4.0 L Turbo V8	M	95	(Denmark) Nicki Thiim	All
(United Kingdom) Aston Martin Racing	Aston Martin Vantage AMR	Aston Martin M177 4.0 L Turbo V8	M	95	(United Kingdom) Darren Turner	1–2, 6, 8
(United Kingdom) Aston Martin Racing	Aston Martin Vantage AMR	Aston Martin M177 4.0 L Turbo V8	M	97	(United Kingdom) Alex Lynn	All
(United Kingdom) Aston Martin Racing	Aston Martin Vantage AMR	Aston Martin M177 4.0 L Turbo V8	M	97	(Belgium) Maxime Martin	All
(United Kingdom) Aston Martin Racing	Aston Martin Vantage AMR	Aston Martin M177 4.0 L Turbo V8	M	97	(United Kingdom) Jonathan Adam	1–2, 8

=== LMGTE Am ===
Entrant	Car	Engine	Tyre	No.	Drivers	Rounds
(Switzerland) Spirit of Race	Ferrari 488 GTE	Ferrari F154CB 4.0 L Turbo V8	M	54	(Italy) Francesco Castellacci	All
(Switzerland) Spirit of Race	Ferrari 488 GTE	Ferrari F154CB 4.0 L Turbo V8	M	54	(Italy) Giancarlo Fisichella	All
(Switzerland) Spirit of Race	Ferrari 488 GTE	Ferrari F154CB 4.0 L Turbo V8	M	54	(Switzerland) Thomas Flohr	All
(Germany) Team Project 1	Porsche 911 RSR	Porsche M97/80 4.0 L Flat-6	M	56	(Germany) Jörg Bergmeister	All
(Germany) Team Project 1	Porsche 911 RSR	Porsche M97/80 4.0 L Flat-6	M	56	(United States) Patrick Lindsey	All
(Germany) Team Project 1	Porsche 911 RSR	Porsche M97/80 4.0 L Flat-6	M	56	(Norway) Egidio Perfetti	All
(Singapore) Clearwater Racing	Ferrari 488 GTE	Ferrari F154CB 4.0 L Turbo V8	M	61	(Republic of Ireland) Matt Griffin	All
(Singapore) Clearwater Racing	Ferrari 488 GTE	Ferrari F154CB 4.0 L Turbo V8	M	61	(Japan) Keita Sawa	1–5
(Singapore) Clearwater Racing	Ferrari 488 GTE	Ferrari F154CB 4.0 L Turbo V8	M	61	(Malaysia) Weng Sun Mok	1–5
(Singapore) Clearwater Racing	Ferrari 488 GTE	Ferrari F154CB 4.0 L Turbo V8	M	61	(Argentina) Luis Pérez Companc	6–8
(Singapore) Clearwater Racing	Ferrari 488 GTE	Ferrari F154CB 4.0 L Turbo V8	M	61	(Italy) Matteo Cressoni	6–8
(Japan) MR Racing	Ferrari 488 GTE	Ferrari F154CB 4.0 L Turbo V8	M	70	(Monaco) Olivier Beretta	All
(Japan) MR Racing	Ferrari 488 GTE	Ferrari F154CB 4.0 L Turbo V8	M	70	(Italy) Eddie Cheever III	All
(Japan) MR Racing	Ferrari 488 GTE	Ferrari F154CB 4.0 L Turbo V8	M	70	(Japan) Motoaki Ishikawa	All
(Germany) Dempsey-Proton Racing	Porsche 911 RSR	Porsche M97/80 4.0 L Flat-6	M	77	(Australia) Matt Campbell	All
(Germany) Dempsey-Proton Racing	Porsche 911 RSR	Porsche M97/80 4.0 L Flat-6	M	77	(Germany) Christian Ried	All
(Germany) Dempsey-Proton Racing	Porsche 911 RSR	Porsche M97/80 4.0 L Flat-6	M	77	(France) Julien Andlauer	1–6, 8
(Germany) Dempsey-Proton Racing	Porsche 911 RSR	Porsche M97/80 4.0 L Flat-6	M	77	(Italy) Riccardo Pera	7
(Germany) Dempsey-Proton Racing	Porsche 911 RSR	Porsche M97/80 4.0 L Flat-6	M	88	(Italy) Matteo Cairoli	All
(Germany) Dempsey-Proton Racing	Porsche 911 RSR	Porsche M97/80 4.0 L Flat-6	M	88	(Italy) Giorgio Roda	1–4, 6–8
(Germany) Dempsey-Proton Racing	Porsche 911 RSR	Porsche M97/80 4.0 L Flat-6	M	88	(United Arab Emirates) Khaled Al Qubaisi	1–2, 5
(Germany) Dempsey-Proton Racing	Porsche 911 RSR	Porsche M97/80 4.0 L Flat-6	M	88	(Italy) Gianluca Roda	3, 6–7
(Germany) Dempsey-Proton Racing	Porsche 911 RSR	Porsche M97/80 4.0 L Flat-6	M	88	(Japan) Satoshi Hoshino	4, 8
(Germany) Dempsey-Proton Racing	Porsche 911 RSR	Porsche M97/80 4.0 L Flat-6	M	88	(Italy) Riccardo Pera	5
(United Kingdom) Gulf Racing UK	Porsche 911 RSR	Porsche M97/80 4.0 L Flat-6	M	86	(United Kingdom) Michael Wainwright	All
(United Kingdom) Gulf Racing UK	Porsche 911 RSR	Porsche M97/80 4.0 L Flat-6	M	86	(United Kingdom) Ben Barker	All
(United Kingdom) Gulf Racing UK	Porsche 911 RSR	Porsche M97/80 4.0 L Flat-6	M	86	(Australia) Alex Davison	1–3
(United Kingdom) Gulf Racing UK	Porsche 911 RSR	Porsche M97/80 4.0 L Flat-6	M	86	(Austria) Thomas Preining	4–8
(United Kingdom) TF Sport	Aston Martin Vantage GTE	Aston Martin AM05 4.5 L V8	M	90	(Republic of Ireland) Charlie Eastwood	All
(United Kingdom) TF Sport	Aston Martin Vantage GTE	Aston Martin AM05 4.5 L V8	M	90	(Turkey) Salih Yoluç	All
(United Kingdom) TF Sport	Aston Martin Vantage GTE	Aston Martin AM05 4.5 L V8	M	90	(United Kingdom) Euan Hankey	1–2, 7–8
(United Kingdom) TF Sport	Aston Martin Vantage GTE	Aston Martin AM05 4.5 L V8	M	90	(United Kingdom) Jonathan Adam	3–6
(United Kingdom) Aston Martin Racing	Aston Martin Vantage GTE	Aston Martin AM05 4.5 L V8	M	98	(Canada) Paul Dalla Lana	All
(United Kingdom) Aston Martin Racing	Aston Martin Vantage GTE	Aston Martin AM05 4.5 L V8	M	98	(Portugal) Pedro Lamy	All
(United Kingdom) Aston Martin Racing	Aston Martin Vantage GTE	Aston Martin AM05 4.5 L V8	M	98	(Austria) Mathias Lauda	All

== Results and standings ==
=== Race results ===
The highest finishing competitor entered in the World Endurance Championship is listed below. Invitational entries may have finished ahead of WEC competitors in individual races.

Rnd.	Circuit	LMP1 winners	LMP2 winners	LMGTE Pro winners	LMGTE Am winners	Report
1	Spa-Francorchamps	(Japan) No. 8 Toyota Gazoo Racing	(China) No. 38 Jackie Chan DC Racing (Note: The LMP2 class winner for Spa-Francorchamps was the No. 26 G-Drive Racing invitational entry. As it was not a full-season WEC entrant, the points for the win were awarded to the No. 38 Jackie Chan DC Racing entry.)	(United States) No. 66 Ford Chip Ganassi Team UK	(United Kingdom) No. 98 Aston Martin Racing	Report
1	Spa-Francorchamps	(Spain) Fernando Alonso (Switzerland) Sébastien Buemi (Japan) Kazuki Nakajima	(China) Ho-Pin Tung (France) Gabriel Aubry (Monaco) Stéphane Richelmi	(United States) Billy Johnson (Germany) Stefan Mücke (France) Olivier Pla	(Canada) Paul Dalla Lana (Portugal) Pedro Lamy (Austria) Mathias Lauda	Report
2	Le Mans	(Japan) No. 8 Toyota Gazoo Racing	(France) No. 36 Signatech Alpine Matmut	(Germany) No. 92 Porsche GT Team	(Germany) No. 77 Dempsey-Proton Racing	Report
2	Le Mans	(Spain) Fernando Alonso (Switzerland) Sébastien Buemi (Japan) Kazuki Nakajima	(France) Nicolas Lapierre (Brazil) André Negrão (France) Pierre Thiriet	(Denmark) Michael Christensen (France) Kévin Estre (Belgium) Laurens Vanthoor	(France) Julien Andlauer (Australia) Matt Campbell (Germany) Christian Ried	Report
3	Silverstone	(Switzerland) No. 3 Rebellion Racing	(China) No. 38 Jackie Chan DC Racing	(Italy) No. 51 AF Corse	(Germany) No. 77 Dempsey-Proton Racing	Report
3	Silverstone	(Switzerland) Mathias Beche (France) Thomas Laurent (United States) Gustavo Menezes	(China) Ho-Pin Tung (France) Gabriel Aubry (Monaco) Stéphane Richelmi	(United Kingdom) James Calado (Italy) Alessandro Pier Guidi	(France) Julien Andlauer (Australia) Matt Campbell (Germany) Christian Ried	Report
4	Fuji	(Japan) No. 7 Toyota Gazoo Racing	(China) No. 37 Jackie Chan DC Racing	(Germany) No. 92 Porsche GT Team	(Germany) No. 56 Team Project 1	Report
4	Fuji	(United Kingdom) Mike Conway (Japan) Kamui Kobayashi (Argentina) José María López	(Malaysia) Jazeman Jaafar (Malaysia) Nabil Jeffri (Malaysia) Weiron Tan	(Denmark) Michael Christensen (France) Kévin Estre	(Germany) Jörg Bergmeister (United States) Patrick Lindsey (Norway) Egidio Perfetti	Report
5	Shanghai	(Japan) No. 7 Toyota Gazoo Racing	(China) No. 38 Jackie Chan DC Racing	(United Kingdom) No. 95 Aston Martin Racing	(Germany) No. 77 Dempsey-Proton Racing	Report
5	Shanghai	(United Kingdom) Mike Conway (Japan) Kamui Kobayashi (Argentina) José María López	(China) Ho-Pin Tung (France) Gabriel Aubry (Monaco) Stéphane Richelmi	(Denmark) Marco Sørensen (Denmark) Nicki Thiim	(France) Julien Andlauer (Australia) Matt Campbell (Germany) Christian Ried	Report
6	Sebring	(Japan) No. 8 Toyota Gazoo Racing	(China) No. 37 Jackie Chan DC Racing	(Germany) No. 91 Porsche GT Team	(Germany) No. 77 Dempsey-Proton Racing	Report
6	Sebring	(Spain) Fernando Alonso (Switzerland) Sébastien Buemi (Japan) Kazuki Nakajima	(Denmark) David Heinemeier Hansson (United Kingdom) Jordan King (United Kingdom) Will Stevens	(Italy) Gianmaria Bruni (Austria) Richard Lietz	(France) Julien Andlauer (Australia) Matt Campbell (Germany) Christian Ried	Report
7	Spa-Francorchamps	(Japan) No. 8 Toyota Gazoo Racing	(United States) No. 31 DragonSpeed	(United Kingdom) No. 97 Aston Martin Racing	(Germany) No. 77 Dempsey-Proton Racing	Report
7	Spa-Francorchamps	(Spain) Fernando Alonso (Switzerland) Sébastien Buemi (Japan) Kazuki Nakajima	(United Kingdom) Anthony Davidson (Mexico) Roberto González (Venezuela) Pastor Maldonado	(United Kingdom) Alex Lynn (Belgium) Maxime Martin	(Australia) Matt Campbell (Italy) Riccardo Pera (Germany) Christian Ried	Report
8	Le Mans	(Japan) No. 8 Toyota Gazoo Racing	(France) No. 36 Signatech Alpine Matmut	(Italy) No. 51 AF Corse	(Germany) No. 56 Team Project 1	Report
8	Le Mans	(Spain) Fernando Alonso (Switzerland) Sébastien Buemi (Japan) Kazuki Nakajima	(France) Nicolas Lapierre (Brazil) André Negrão (France) Pierre Thiriet	(United Kingdom) James Calado (Italy) Alessandro Pier Guidi (Brazil) Daniel Serra	(Germany) Jörg Bergmeister (United States) Patrick Lindsey (Norway) Egidio Perfetti	Report

=== Drivers' championships ===
Four titles were offered to drivers, two with world championship status. The LMP World Endurance Drivers' Championship was reserved for LMP1 and LMP2 drivers while the GTE World Endurance Drivers' Championship was available for drivers in the LMGTE categories. FIA Endurance Trophies were awarded in LMP2 and in LMGTE Am.

Entries were required to complete the timed race as well as to complete 70% of the overall winning car's race distance in order to earn championship points. A single bonus point was awarded to the team and all drivers of the pole position car for each category in qualifying. Furthermore, a race must complete two laps under green flag conditions in order for championship points to be awarded.

Points systems
Event	1st	2nd	3rd	4th	5th	6th	7th	8th	9th	10th	Other	Pole
6 Hours	25	18	15	12	10	8	6	4	2	1	0.5	1
8 Hours	32	23	19	15	13	10	8	5	3	2	1	1
24 Hours	38	27	23	18	15	12	9	6	3	2	1	1

==== World Endurance LMP Drivers' Championship ====
Pos.	Driver	Team	SPA (Belgium)	LMS (France)	SIL (United Kingdom)	FUJ (Japan)	SHA (China)	SEB (United States)	SPA (Belgium)	LMS (France)	Total points
1	(Spain) Fernando Alonso	(Japan) Toyota Gazoo Racing	**1**	**1**	DSQ	**2**	2	**1**	1	1	198
1	(Switzerland) Sébastien Buemi	(Japan) Toyota Gazoo Racing	**1**	**1**	DSQ	**2**	2	**1**	1	1	198
1	(Japan) Kazuki Nakajima	(Japan) Toyota Gazoo Racing	**1**	**1**	DSQ	**2**	2	**1**	1	1	198
2	(United Kingdom) Mike Conway	(Japan) Toyota Gazoo Racing	2	2	**DSQ**	1	**1**	2	**6**	**2**	157
2	(Japan) Kamui Kobayashi	(Japan) Toyota Gazoo Racing	2	2	**DSQ**	1	**1**	2	**6**	**2**	157
2	(Argentina) José María López	(Japan) Toyota Gazoo Racing	2	2	**DSQ**	1	**1**	2	**6**	**2**	157
3	(France) Thomas Laurent	(Switzerland) Rebellion Racing	3	3	1	Ret	5	7	2	5	114
3	(United States) Gustavo Menezes	(Switzerland) Rebellion Racing	3	3	1	Ret	5	7	2	5	114
4	(Russia) Mikhail Aleshin	(Russia) SMP Racing	5	Ret	Ret	4	3	3	3	3	94
4	(Russia) Vitaly Petrov	(Russia) SMP Racing	5	Ret	Ret	4	3	3	3	3	94
5	(Switzerland) Neel Jani	(Switzerland) Rebellion Racing	DSQ	4	2	3	4	Ret	5	4	91
5	(Germany) André Lotterer	(Switzerland) Rebellion Racing	DSQ	4	2	3	4		5	4	91
6	(Switzerland) Mathias Beche	(Switzerland) Rebellion Racing	3	3	1	Ret	5	Ret			73
7	(Brazil) Bruno Senna	(Switzerland) Rebellion Racing	DSQ	4	WD	3	4	Ret	5	4	73
8	(France) Nicolas Lapierre	(France) Signatech Alpine Matmut	7	5	6	8	9	5	8	6	64
8	(France) Pierre Thiriet	(France) Signatech Alpine Matmut	7	5	6	8	9	5	8	6	64
8	(Brazil) André Negrão	(France) Signatech Alpine Matmut	7	5	6	8	9	5	8	6	64
9	(France) Nathanaël Berthon	(United States) DragonSpeed	10	7							51
9	(France) Nathanaël Berthon	(Switzerland) Rebellion Racing						7	2	5	51
10	(China) Ho-Pin Tung	(China) Jackie Chan DC Racing	6	8	4	7	7	10	9	7	51
10	(France) Gabriel Aubry	(China) Jackie Chan DC Racing	6	8	4	7	7	10	9	7	51
10	(Monaco) Stéphane Richelmi	(China) Jackie Chan DC Racing	6	8	4	7	7	10	9	7	51
11	(Belgium) Stoffel Vandoorne	(Russia) SMP Racing							3	3	38
12	(Mexico) Roberto González	(United States) DragonSpeed	10	7	7	11	8	6	7	Ret	36.5
12	(Venezuela) Pastor Maldonado	(United States) DragonSpeed	10	7	7	11	8	6	7	Ret	36.5
13	(Malaysia) Jazeman Jaafar	(China) Jackie Chan DC Racing	8	6	5	6	10				35
13	(Malaysia) Nabil Jeffri	(China) Jackie Chan DC Racing	8	6	5	6	10				35
13	(Malaysia) Weiron Tan	(China) Jackie Chan DC Racing	8	6	5	6	10				35
14	(Russia) Egor Orudzhev	(Russia) SMP Racing	Ret	Ret	3	Ret	Ret	NC	4	Ret	27
14	(France) Stéphane Sarrazin	(Russia) SMP Racing	Ret	Ret	3	Ret	Ret	NC	4	Ret	27
15	(United Kingdom) Jenson Button	(Russia) SMP Racing		Ret	Ret	4	3				27
16	(United Kingdom) Anthony Davidson	(United States) DragonSpeed			7	11	8	6	7	Ret	26.5
17	(United Kingdom) Oliver Webb	(Austria) ByKolles Racing Team	4	Ret	Ret	5	Ret		14	Ret	22.5
17	(France) Tom Dillmann	(Austria) ByKolles Racing Team	4	Ret		5	Ret		14	Ret	22.5
18	(New Zealand) Brendon Hartley	(Russia) SMP Racing						3			19
19	(United Kingdom) Jordan King	(China) Jackie Chan DC Racing						4	12	Ret	15.5
19	(Denmark) David Heinemeier Hansson	(China) Jackie Chan DC Racing						4	12	Ret	15.5
19	(United Kingdom) Will Stevens	(China) Jackie Chan DC Racing						4	12		15.5
20	(France) Erwin Creed	(France) Larbre Compétition	11	10	9	10	12	8	13	9	14.5
20	(France) Romano Ricci	(France) Larbre Compétition	11	10	9	10	12	8	13	9	14.5
21	(Netherlands) Giedo van der Garde	(Netherlands) Racing Team Nederland	12	9	8	12	11	9	11	10	14
21	(Netherlands) Frits van Eerd	(Netherlands) Racing Team Nederland	12	9	8	12	11	9	11	10	14
22	(Austria) Dominik Kraihamer	(Austria) ByKolles Racing Team	4	Ret							12
23	(Russia) Sergey Sirotkin	(Russia) SMP Racing						NC	4	Ret	12
24	(France) François Perrodo	(France) TDS Racing	9	DSQ	10	9	NC	NC	10	8	12
24	(France) Matthieu Vaxivière	(France) TDS Racing	9	DSQ	10	9	NC	NC	10	8	12
25	(Netherlands) Nyck de Vries	(Netherlands) Racing Team Nederland			8	12	11	9	11	10	10.5
Pos.	Driver	Team	SPA (Belgium)	LMS (France)	SIL (United Kingdom)	FUJ (Japan)	SHA (China)	SEB (United States)	SPA (Belgium)	LMS (France)	Total points

Colour	Result
Gold	Winner
Silver	Second place
Bronze	Third place
Green	Points classification
Blue	Non-points classification
Blue	Non-classified finish (NC)
Purple	Retired, not classified (Ret)
Red	Did not qualify (DNQ)
Red	Did not pre-qualify (DNPQ)
Black	Disqualified (DSQ)
White	Did not start (DNS)
White	Withdrew (WD)
White	Race cancelled (C)
Blank	Did not practice (DNP)
Blank	Did not arrive (DNA)
Blank	Excluded (EX)

**Bold** - Pole position

==== World Endurance GTE Drivers' Championship ====
Pos.	Driver	Team	SPA (Belgium)	LMS (France)	SIL (United Kingdom)	FUJ (Japan)	SHA (China)	SEB (United States)	SPA (Belgium)	LMS (France)	Total points
1	(Denmark) Michael Christensen	(Germany) Porsche GT Team	2	1	3	1	3	**5**	3	5	155
1	(France) Kévin Estre	(Germany) Porsche GT Team	2	1	3	1	3	**5**	3	5	155
2	(United Kingdom) James Calado	(Italy) AF Corse	15	4	1	4	5	4	2	1	136.5
2	(Italy) Alessandro Pier Guidi	(Italy) AF Corse	15	4	1	4	5	4	2	1	136.5
3	(Italy) Gianmaria Bruni	(Germany) Porsche GT Team	4	**2**	DSQ	5	2	1	8	2	131
3	(Austria) Richard Lietz	(Germany) Porsche GT Team	4	**2**	DSQ	5	2	1	8	2	131
4	(United Kingdom) Harry Tincknell	(United States) Ford Chip Ganassi Team UK	**Ret**	12	2	3	9	3	**5**	3	90
4	(United Kingdom) Andy Priaulx	(United States) Ford Chip Ganassi Team UK	**Ret**	12	2	3	9	3	**5**	3	90
5	(Germany) Stefan Mücke	(United States) Ford Chip Ganassi Team UK	1	3	**6**	8	**7**	18	10	4	88
5	(France) Olivier Pla	(United States) Ford Chip Ganassi Team UK	1	3	**6**	8	**7**	18	10	4	88
6	(Brazil) Daniel Serra	(Italy) AF Corse		4				4		1	71
7	(United States) Billy Johnson	(United States) Ford Chip Ganassi Team UK	1	3				18		4	67
8	(United Kingdom) Alex Lynn	(United Kingdom) Aston Martin Racing	6	13	4	9	4	8	1	14	66
8	(Belgium) Maxime Martin	(United Kingdom) Aston Martin Racing	6	13	4	9	4	8	1	14	66
9	(Denmark) Nicki Thiim	(United Kingdom) Aston Martin Racing	7	5	17	**6**	1	9	7	**Ret**	65.5
9	(Denmark) Marco Sørensen	(United Kingdom) Aston Martin Racing	7	5	17	**6**	1	9	7	**Ret**	65.5
10	(Portugal) António Félix da Costa	(Germany) BMW Team MTEK	5	Ret	Ret	2	10	7	4	6	61
11	(France) Frédéric Makowiecki	(Germany) Porsche GT Team		**2**						2	55
12	(Italy) Davide Rigon	(Italy) AF Corse	3	6	16	10	6	6	6	Ret	54.5
12	(United Kingdom) Sam Bird	(Italy) AF Corse	3	6	16	10	6	6	6	Ret	54.5
13	(Belgium) Laurens Vanthoor	(Germany) Porsche GT Team		1						5	53
14	(Germany) Martin Tomczyk	(Germany) BMW Team MTEK	8	9	5	7	8	2	9	15	53
14	(Netherlands) Nicky Catsburg	(Germany) BMW Team MTEK	8	9	5	7	8	2	9	15	53
15	(United States) Jonathan Bomarito	(United States) Ford Chip Ganassi Team UK						3		3	42
16	(Brazil) Augusto Farfus	(Germany) BMW Team MTEK		Ret	Ret			7	4	6	32
17	(United Kingdom) Tom Blomqvist	(Germany) BMW Team MTEK	5			2	10				29
18	(United Kingdom) Darren Turner	(United Kingdom) Aston Martin Racing	7	5				9		**Ret**	25
19	(United Kingdom) Alexander Sims	(Germany) BMW Team MTEK		Ret				2			23
20	(Spain) Miguel Molina	(Italy) AF Corse		6				6		Ret	22
21	(United Kingdom) Jonathan Adam	(United Kingdom) Aston Martin Racing	6	13						14	16
21	(United Kingdom) Jonathan Adam	(United Kingdom) TF Sport			8	13	18	15			16
22	(Germany) Jörg Bergmeister	(Germany) Team Project 1	18	11	9	11	12	12	15	7	16
22	(United States) Patrick Lindsey	(Germany) Team Project 1	18	11	9	11	12	12	15	7	16
22	(Norway) Egidio Perfetti	(Germany) Team Project 1	18	11	9	11	12	12	15	7	16
23	(Finland) Jesse Krohn	(Germany) BMW Team MTEK								6	12
24	(Italy) Giancarlo Fisichella	(Switzerland) Spirit of Race	17	8	15	16	14	11	13	13	10.5
24	(Italy) Francesco Castellacci	(Switzerland) Spirit of Race	17	8	15	16	14	11	13	13	10.5
24	(Switzerland) Thomas Flohr	(Switzerland) Spirit of Race	17	8	15	16	14	11	13	13	10.5
Pos.	Driver	Team	SPA (Belgium)	LMS (France)	SIL (United Kingdom)	FUJ (Japan)	SHA (China)	SEB (United States)	SPA (Belgium)	LMS (France)	Total points

==== World Endurance Trophy for LMP2 Drivers ====
Pos.	Driver	Team	SPA (Belgium)	LMS (France)	SIL (United Kingdom)	FUJ (Japan)	SHA (China)	SEB (United States)	SPA (Belgium)	LMS (France)	Total points
1	(France) Nicolas Lapierre	(France) Signatech Alpine Matmut	**2**	1	3	3	3	2	2	1	181
1	(France) Pierre Thiriet	(France) Signatech Alpine Matmut	**2**	1	3	3	3	2	2	1	181
1	(Brazil) André Negrão	(France) Signatech Alpine Matmut	**2**	1	3	3	3	2	2	1	181
2	(China) Ho-Pin Tung	(China) Jackie Chan DC Racing	1	4	1	2	**1**	**6**	**3**	2	166
2	(France) Gabriel Aubry	(China) Jackie Chan DC Racing	1	4	1	2	**1**	**6**	**3**	2	166
2	(Monaco) Stéphane Richelmi	(China) Jackie Chan DC Racing	1	4	1	2	**1**	**6**	**3**	2	166
3	(Mexico) Roberto González	(United States) DragonSpeed	5	**3**	4	**6**	2	3	1	Ret	117
3	(Venezuela) Pastor Maldonado	(United States) DragonSpeed	5	**3**	4	**6**	2	3	1	Ret	117
4	(Malaysia) Jazeman Jaafar	(China) Jackie Chan DC Racing	3	2	**2**	1	4				98
4	(Malaysia) Nabil Jeffri	(China) Jackie Chan DC Racing	3	2	**2**	1	4				98
4	(Malaysia) Weiron Tan	(China) Jackie Chan DC Racing	3	2	**2**	1	4				98
5	(France) Erwin Creed	(France) Larbre Compétition	6	6	6	5	6	4	7	4	85
5	(France) Romano Ricci	(France) Larbre Compétition	6	6	6	5	6	4	7	4	85
6	(Netherlands) Giedo van der Garde	(Netherlands) Racing Team Nederland	7	5	5	7	5	5	5	5	85
6	(Netherlands) Frits van Eerd	(Netherlands) Racing Team Nederland	7	5	5	7	5	5	5	5	85
7	(United Kingdom) Anthony Davidson	(United States) DragonSpeed			4	**6**	2	3	1	Ret	83
8	(France) François Perrodo	(France) TDS Racing	4	DSQ	7	4	Ret	NC	4	**3**	66
8	(France) Matthieu Vaxivière	(France) TDS Racing	4	DSQ	7	4	Ret	NC	4	**3**	66
9	(Netherlands) Nyck de Vries	(Netherlands) Racing Team Nederland			5	7	5	5	5	5	64
10	(France) Loïc Duval	(France) TDS Racing	4	DSQ	7		Ret	NC		**3**	42
11	(United Kingdom) Jordan King	(China) Jackie Chan DC Racing						1	6	Ret	40
11	(Denmark) David Heinemeier Hansson	(China) Jackie Chan DC Racing						1	6	Ret	40
11	(United Kingdom) Will Stevens	(China) Jackie Chan DC Racing						1	6		40
12	(France) Nathanaël Berthon	(United States) DragonSpeed	5	**3**							34
13	(United States) Nicholas Boulle	(France) Larbre Compétition							7	4	24
14	(Netherlands) Jan Lammers	(Netherlands) Racing Team Nederland	7	5							21
15	(United States) Gunnar Jeannette	(France) Larbre Compétition						4			15
16	(France) Jean-Éric Vergne	(France) TDS Racing				4					12
16	(France) Norman Nato	(France) TDS Racing							4		12
17	(France) Thomas Dagoneau	(France) Larbre Compétition		6							12
18	(Japan) Keiko Ihara	(France) Larbre Compétition				5					10
19	(France) Julien Canal	(France) Larbre Compétition	6								8
19	(Japan) Yoshiharu Mori	(France) Larbre Compétition			6						8
19	(France) Enzo Guibbert	(France) Larbre Compétition					6				8

==== Endurance Trophy for LMGTE Am Drivers ====
Pos.	Driver	Team	SPA (Belgium)	LMS (France)	SIL (United Kingdom)	FUJ (Japan)	SHA (China)	SEB (United States)	SPA (Belgium)	LMS (France)	Total points
1	(Germany) Jörg Bergmeister	(Germany) Team Project 1	9	3	**3**	1	2	3	5	1	151
1	(United States) Patrick Lindsey	(Germany) Team Project 1	9	3	**3**	1	2	3	5	1	151
1	(Norway) Egidio Perfetti	(Germany) Team Project 1	9	3	**3**	1	2	3	5	1	151
2	(Australia) Matt Campbell	(Germany) Dempsey-Proton Racing	**4**	1	1	DSQ	1	**1**	1	2	110 (Note: Following the 6 Hours of Fuji, Dempsey-Proton Racing was penalized for exceeding the minimum refueling time during pit stops. Upon further investigation, the FIA data loggers for the team's cars were found to have been altered to manipulate the refueling times for the cars for at least two races. The team failed to disclose their consultant who tampered with the loggers, therefore the FIA nullified all points earned by the team prior to the Shanghai round.)
2	(Germany) Christian Ried	(Germany) Dempsey-Proton Racing	**4**	1	1	DSQ	1	**1**	1	2	110
3	(Turkey) Salih Yoluç	(United Kingdom) TF Sport	2	Ret	2	2	8	6	**2**	6	99
3	(Republic of Ireland) Charlie Eastwood	(United Kingdom) TF Sport	2	Ret	2	2	8	6	**2**	6	99
4	(Switzerland) Thomas Flohr	(Switzerland) Spirit of Race	8	2	9	5	4	2	4	7	99
4	(Italy) Francesco Castellacci	(Switzerland) Spirit of Race	8	2	9	5	4	2	4	7	99
4	(Italy) Giancarlo Fisichella	(Switzerland) Spirit of Race	8	2	9	5	4	2	4	7	99
5	(Republic of Ireland) Matt Griffin	(Singapore) Clearwater Racing	3	4	5	6	7	DNS	3	3	95
6	(France) Julien Andlauer	(Germany) Dempsey-Proton Racing	**4**	1	1	DSQ	1	**1**		2	85
7	(United Kingdom) Michael Wainwright	(United Kingdom) Gulf Racing	7	6	6	4	9	4	7	4	79
7	(United Kingdom) Ben Barker	(United Kingdom) Gulf Racing	7	6	6	4	9	4	7	4	79
8	(Canada) Paul Dalla Lana	(United Kingdom) Aston Martin Racing	1	Ret	4	**3**	**5**	8	6	Ret	77
8	(Austria) Mathias Lauda	(United Kingdom) Aston Martin Racing	1	Ret	4	**3**	**5**	8	6	Ret	77
8	(Portugal) Pedro Lamy	(United Kingdom) Aston Martin Racing	1	Ret	4	**3**	**5**	8	6	Ret	77
9	(Monaco) Olivier Beretta	(Japan) MR Racing	5	5	7	Ret	6	5	8	5	71
9	(Italy) Eddie Cheever III	(Japan) MR Racing	5	5	7	Ret	6	5	8	5	71
9	(Japan) Motoaki Ishikawa	(Japan) MR Racing	5	5	7	Ret	6	5	8	5	71
10	(Malaysia) Weng Sun Mok	(Singapore) Clearwater Racing	3	4	5	6	7				57
10	(Japan) Keita Sawa	(Singapore) Clearwater Racing	3	4	5	6	7				57
11	(Austria) Thomas Preining	(United Kingdom) Gulf Racing				4	9	4	7	4	53
12	(United Kingdom) Jonathan Adam	(United Kingdom) TF Sport			2	2	8	6			50
13	(United Kingdom) Euan Hankey	(United Kingdom) TF Sport	2	Ret					**2**	6	49
14	(Italy) Riccardo Pera	(Germany) Dempsey-Proton Racing					3		1		40
15	(Argentina) Luis Pérez Companc	(Singapore) Clearwater Racing						DNS	3	3	38
15	(Italy) Matteo Cressoni	(Singapore) Clearwater Racing						DNS	3	3	38
16	(Italy) Matteo Cairoli	(Germany) Dempsey-Proton Racing	6	**Ret**	8	DSQ	3	7	9	**Ret**	26
17	(Australia) Alex Davison	(United Kingdom) Gulf Racing	7	6	6						26
18	(United Arab Emirates) Khaled Al Qubaisi	(Germany) Dempsey-Proton Racing	6	**Ret**			3				15
19	(Italy) Giorgio Roda	(Germany) Dempsey-Proton Racing	6	**Ret**	8	DSQ		7	9	**Ret**	11
20	(Italy) Gianluca Roda	(Germany) Dempsey-Proton Racing			8			7	9		10
21	(Japan) Satoshi Hoshino	(Germany) Dempsey-Proton Racing				DSQ				**Ret**	1

=== Manufacturers' and teams' championships ===
A world championship for LMGTE manufacturers was awarded, while the former title for manufacturers in LMP1 was replaced by a world championship for LMP1 teams. FIA Endurance Trophies were awarded for LMP2 and LMGTE Am teams, while the former trophy for LMGTE Pro teams had been eliminated for 2018.

==== World Endurance LMP1 Championship ====
Points were awarded only for the highest finishing competitor from each team.

Pos.	Team	SPA (Belgium)	LMS (France)	SIL (United Kingdom)	FUJ (Japan)	SHA (China)	SEB (United States)	SPA (Belgium)	LMS (France)	Total points
1	(Japan) Toyota Gazoo Racing	**1**	**1**	**DSQ**	**1**	**1**	**1**	**1**	**1**	216
2	(Switzerland) Rebellion Racing	3	3	1	3	4	7	2	4	134
3	(Russia) SMP Racing	5	Ret	3	4	3	3	3	3	109
4	(Austria) ByKolles Racing Team	4	Ret	Ret	5	Ret		34	Ret	22.5
5	(United States) DragonSpeed	DNS	Ret	25	Ret	6	Ret		Ret	8.5
6	(China) CEFC TRSM Racing	WD	41							1

==== World Endurance GTE Manufacturers' Championship ====
The two highest finishing competitors from each manufacturer were awarded points.

Pos.	Manufacturer	SPA (Belgium)	LMS (France)	SIL (United Kingdom)	FUJ (Japan)	SHA (China)	SEB (United States)	SPA (Belgium)	LMS (France)	Total points
1	(Germany) Porsche	2	1	3	1	2	1	3	2	288
1	(Germany) Porsche	4	**2**	9 (Note: Following the 6 Hours of Fuji, Dempsey-Proton Racing was penalized for exceeding the minimum refueling time during pit stops. Upon further investigation, the FIA data loggers for the team's cars were found to have been altered to manipulate the refueling times for the cars for at least two races. The team failed to disclose their consultant who tampered with the loggers, therefore the FIA nullified all points earned by the team prior to the Shanghai round. This included some of Porsche's Manufacturers' Championship points for Silverstone being cancelled. The points were redistributed to the next best team.)	5	3	**5**	8	5	288
2	(Italy) Ferrari	3	4	1	4	5	4	2	1	194
2	(Italy) Ferrari	11	6	11	10	6	6	6	9	194
3	(United States) Ford	1	3	2	3	**7**	3	**5**	3	178
3	(United States) Ford	**Ret**	12	**6**	8	9	18	10	4	178
4	(United Kingdom) Aston Martin	6	5	4	**6**	1	8	1	12	136
4	(United Kingdom) Aston Martin	7	13	8	9	4	9	7	**14**	136
5	(Germany) BMW	5	9	5	2	8	2	4	6	114
5	(Germany) BMW	8	Ret	Ret	7	10	7	9	15	114

==== Endurance Trophy for LMP2 Teams ====
Pos.	Car	Team	SPA (Belgium)	LMS (France)	SIL (United Kingdom)	FUJ (Japan)	SHA (China)	SEB (United States)	SPA (Belgium)	LMS (France)	Total points
1	36	(France) Signatech Alpine Matmut	**2**	1	3	3	3	2	2	1	181
2	38	(China) Jackie Chan DC Racing	1	4	1	2	**1**	**6**	**3**	2	166
3	37	(China) Jackie Chan DC Racing	3	2	**2**	1	4	1	6	Ret	138
4	31	(United States) DragonSpeed	5	**3**	4	**6**	2	3	1	Ret	117
5	50	(France) Larbre Compétition	6	6	6	5	6	4	7	4	85
6	29	(Netherlands) Racing Team Nederland	7	5	5	7	5	5	5	5	85
7	28	(France) TDS Racing	4	DSQ	7	4	Ret	NC	4	**3**	66

==== Endurance Trophy for LMGTE Am Teams ====
Pos.	Car	Team	SPA (Belgium)	LMS (France)	SIL (United Kingdom)	FUJ (Japan)	SHA (China)	SEB (United States)	SPA (Belgium)	LMS (France)	Total points
1	56	(Germany) Team Project 1	9	3	**3**	1	2	3	5	1	151
2	77	(Germany) Dempsey-Proton Racing	**4**	1	1	DSQ	1	**1**	1	2	110 (Note: Following the 6 Hours of Fuji, Dempsey-Proton Racing was penalized for exceeding the minimum refueling time during pit stops. Upon further investigation, the FIA data loggers for the team's cars were found to have been altered to manipulate the refueling times for the cars for at least two races. The team failed to disclose their consultant who tampered with the loggers, therefore the FIA nullified all points earned by the team prior to the Shanghai round.)
3	90	(United Kingdom) TF Sport	2	Ret	2	2	8	6	**2**	6	99
4	54	(Switzerland) Spirit of Race	8	2	9	5	4	2	4	7	99
5	61	(Singapore) Clearwater Racing	3	4	5	6	7	DNS	3	3	95
6	86	(United Kingdom) Gulf Racing	7	6	6	4	9	4	7	4	79
7	98	(United Kingdom) Aston Martin Racing	1	Ret	4	**3**	**5**	8	6	Ret	77
8	70	(Japan) MR Racing	5	5	7	Ret	6	5	8	5	71
9	88	(Germany) Dempsey-Proton Racing	6	**Ret**	8	DSQ	3	7	9	**Ret**	26
