= Paul Dalla Lana =

Canadian racing driver

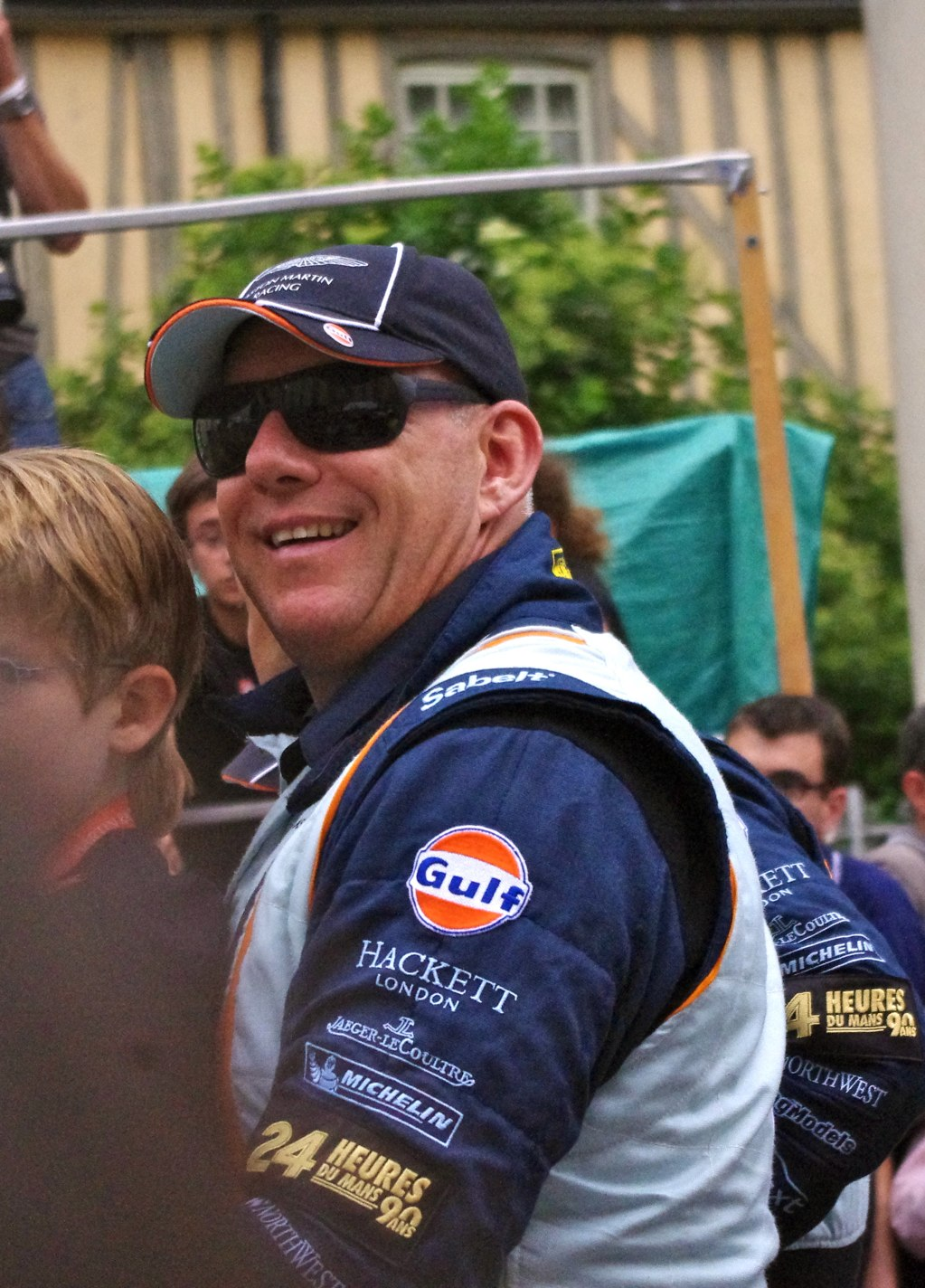
- Dalla Lana in 2013
- Nationality: (Canada) Canadian
- Born: Paul Louis Dalla Lana; February 1, 1966 (age 60) Vancouver, Canada

FIA World Endurance Championship career
- Categorisation: FIA Silver (until 2013); FIA Bronze (2014–)
- Years active: 2013–2023
- Car number: 98
- Starts: 67 (67 entries)
- Wins: 17
- Podiums: 36
- Best finish: 1st (LMGTE Am) in 2017

Paul Louis Dalla Lana (born February 1, 1966) is a Canadian entrepreneur, philanthropist, and former amateur racing driver who recently drove for Northwest AMR in the World Endurance Championship. He is featured in the documentary "The Gentleman Driver", about non-professional drivers.

Dalla Lana is the founder of NorthWest Healthcare Properties Real Estate Investment Trust, which owns and manages medical buildings in Canada. In 2008, he donated CAD $20-million to establish the Dalla Lana School of Public Health at the University of Toronto. In 2018, it was announced he was making an additional $20-million gift to the school.

In April 2023, Dalla Lana announced that he would be retiring from motorsport with immediate effect to concentrate on his business ventures.

== Racing record ==
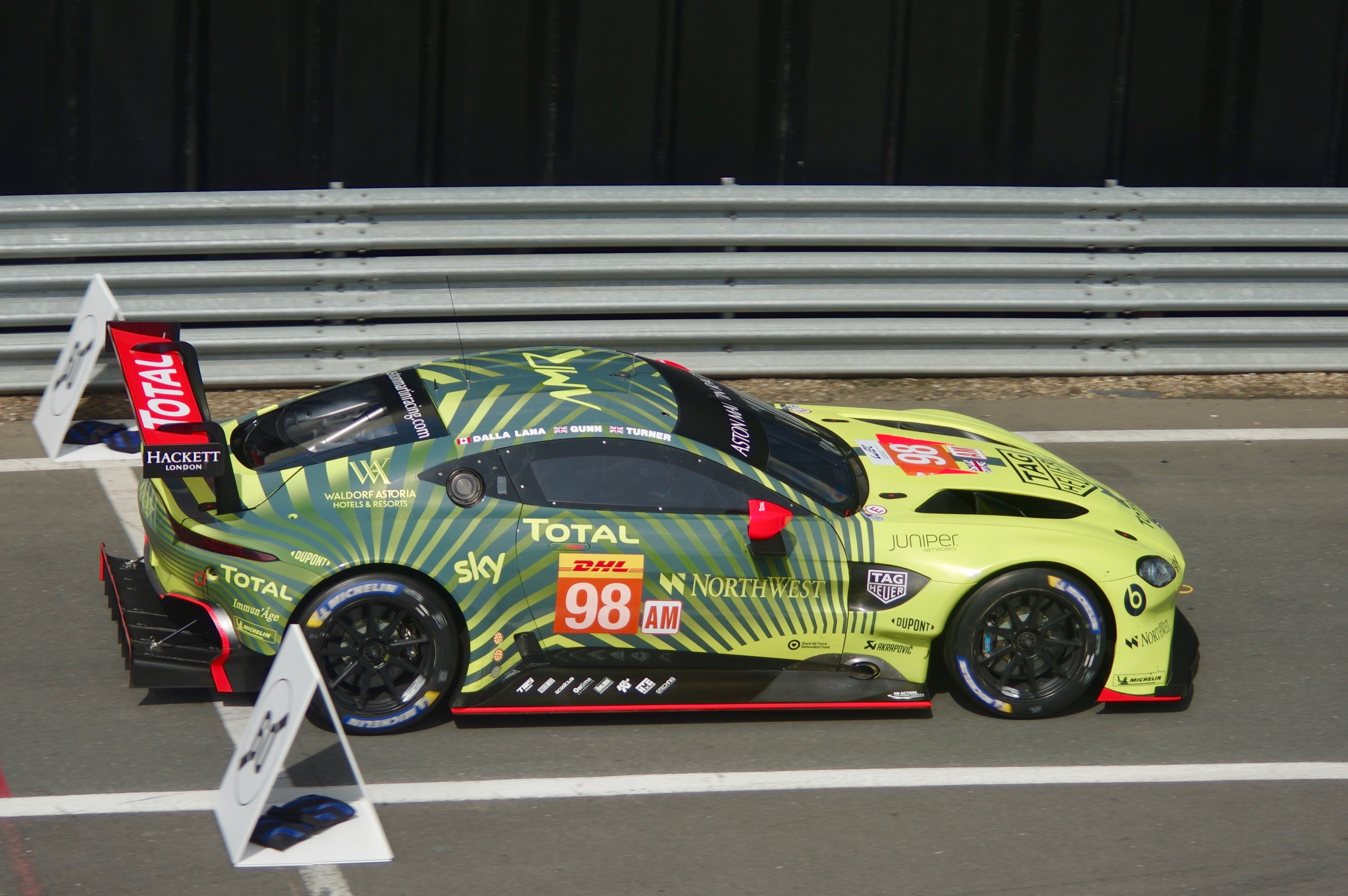
All ten of Dalla Lana's 24 Hours of Le Mans starts were with Aston Martin (pictured in 2019).

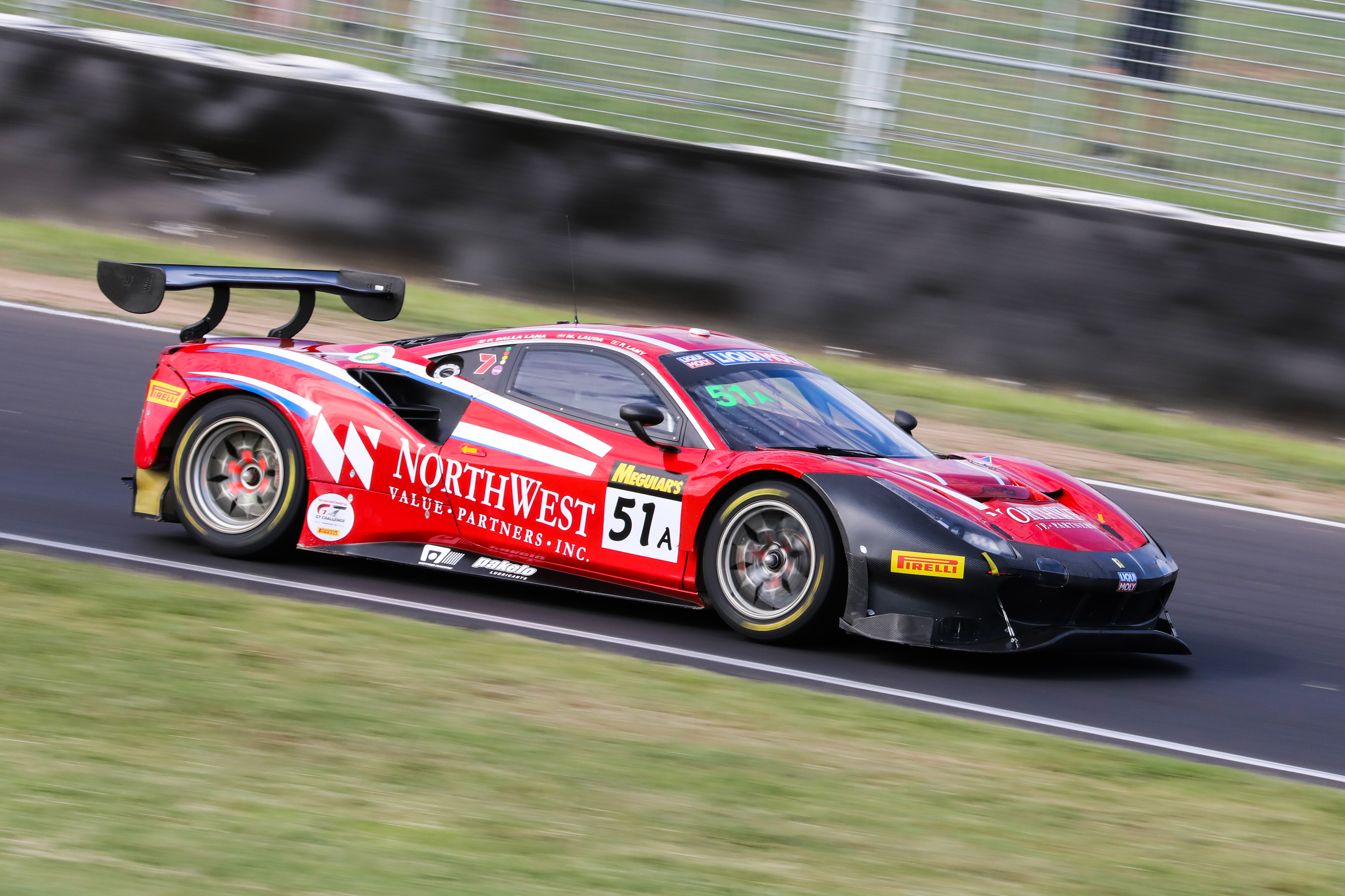
Dalla Lana racing a Ferrari at the 2019 Bathurst 12 Hour.

=== Racing career summary ===
Season	Series	Team	Races	Wins	Poles	F/Laps	Podiums	Points	Position
2009	Grand-Am Koni Challenge - ST	Turner Motorsport	7	0	0	0	1	83	37th
2009	Canadian Touring Car Championship - Super Touring	GT Racing	4	?	?	?	?	1035	8th
2010	IMSA Sports Car Challenge - Grand Sport	Turner Motorsport	5	0	0	0	0	33	47th
2010	Grand American Rolex Series - GT	Turner Motorsport	6	0	0	0	1	94	28th
2010	Canadian Touring Car Championship - Super Touring	YTR-Aldo/Northwest	8	0	0	0	0	331	20th
2011	IMSA Sports Car Challenge - Grand Sport	Turner Motorsport	10	1	0	0	5	276	**1st**
2011	Grand American Rolex Series - GT	Turner Motorsport	12	2	0	0	3	294	7th
2011	Dubai 24 Hour - A6	Need for Speed Team Schubert	1	0	0	0	0	N/A	5th
2012	IMSA Sports Car Challenge - Grand Sport	Turner Motorsport	10	0	0	0	0	136	26th
2012	Grand American Rolex Series - GT	Turner Motorsport	13	2	0	0	4	339	**3rd**
2013	IMSA Sports Car Challenge - Grand Sport	Turner Motorsport	11	1	0	0	3	209	9th
2013	Grand American Rolex Series - GT	Turner Motorsport	12	3	0	0	3	282	7th
2013	FIA World Endurance Championship - LMGTE Pro	Aston Martin Racing	5	0	0	0	1	0	NC†
2013	24 Hours of Le Mans - LMGTE Pro	Aston Martin Racing	1	0	0	0	0	N/A	DNF
2013	American Le Mans Series - GT	Aston Martin Racing	1	0	0	0	0	0	NC†
2014	FIA World Endurance Championship - LMGTE Am	Aston Martin Racing	8	3	0	0	7	164	**2nd**
2014	24 Hours of Le Mans - LMGTE Am	Aston Martin Racing	1	0	0	0	0	N/A	6th
2014	United Sports Car Championship - GTLM	Aston Martin Racing	1	0	0	0	0	24	34th
2014	United Sports Car Championship - GTD	Turner Motorsport	3	0	0	0	0	43	47th
2014	IMSA Sports Car Challenge - Grand Sport	Turner Motorsport	1	0	0	0	0	0	88th
2014	Dubai 24 Hour - A6 Pro	SX Team Schubert	1	0	0	0	0	N/A	7th
2015	FIA World Endurance Championship - LMGTE Am	Aston Martin Racing	8	3	3	0	6	144	**3rd**
2015	24 Hours of Le Mans - LMGTE Am	Aston Martin Racing	1	0	0	0	0	N/A	NC
2015	United Sports Car Championship - GTLM	Aston Martin Racing	2	0	0	0	0	52	19th
2016	FIA World Endurance Championship - LMGTE Am	Aston Martin Racing	9	5	4	0	6	149	**3rd**
2016	24 Hours of Le Mans - LMGTE Am	Aston Martin Racing	1	0	0	0	0	N/A	DNF
2016	IMSA SportsCar Championship - GTD	Aston Martin Racing	2	0	0	0	0	51	31st
2017	FIA World Endurance Championship - LMGTE Am	Aston Martin Racing	9	4	4	0	7	192	**1st**
2017	24 Hours of Le Mans - LMGTE Am	Aston Martin Racing	1	0	0	0	0	N/A	8th
2017	IMSA Sportscar Championship - GTD	Aston Martin Racing	1	0	0	0	0	19	69th
2017	Intercontinental GT Challenge	HTP Motorsport	1	0	0	0	0	0	NC
2017	Bathurst 12 Hour - GT3 Pro-Am	HTP Motorsport	1	0	0	0	0	N/A	DNF
2018	Intercontinental GT Challenge	Audi Sport Team WRT	1	0	0	0	0	1	25th
2018	Bathurst 12 Hour - GT3 Pro-Am	Audi Sport Team WRT	1	0	0	0	0	N/A	8th
2018	IMSA SportsCar Championship - GTD	Spirit of Race	2	0	0	0	0	29	52nd
2018	24 Hours of Le Mans - LMGTE Am	Aston Martin Racing	1	0	0	0	0	N/A	DNF
2018–19	FIA World Endurance Championship - LMGTE Am	Aston Martin Racing	8	1	1	0	2	77	8th
2019	24 Hours of Le Mans - LMGTE Am	Aston Martin Racing	1	0	0	0	0	N/A	DNF
2019	Bathurst 12 Hour - GT3 Pro-Am	Spirit of Race	1	1	0	0	1	N/A	**1st**
2019	Intercontinental GT Challenge	Spirit of Race	1	0	0	0	0	4	34th
2019	IMSA SportsCar Championship - GTD	Spirit of Race	1	0	0	0	0	11	67th
2019–20	FIA World Endurance Championship - LMGTE Am	Aston Martin Racing	8	0	1	0	4	100.5	7th
2020	European Le Mans Series - LMGTE	Aston Martin Racing	2	0	0	0	1	0	NC†
2020	24 Hours of Le Mans - LMGTE Am	Aston Martin Racing	1	0	0	0	0	N/A	8th
2021	FIA World Endurance Championship - LMGTE Am	Aston Martin Racing	6	0	0	0	1	58	8th
2021	24 Hours of Le Mans - LMGTE Am	Aston Martin Racing	1	0	0	0	0	N/A	DNF
2022	FIA World Endurance Championship - LMGTE Am	Northwest AMR	6	1	0	0	3	118	**2nd**
2022	24 Hours of Le Mans - LMGTE Am	Northwest AMR	1	0	0	0	1	N/A	**3rd**
2022	IMSA SportsCar Championship - GTD	Northwest AMR	2	0	0	0	0	211	61st
2023	FIA World Endurance Championship - LMGTE Am	Northwest AMR	2	0	0	0	0	0	29th

† As Dalla Lana was a guest driver, he was ineligible to score championship points.

=== Complete FIA World Endurance Championship results ===
(key) (Races in bold indicate pole position) (Races in italics indicate fastest lap)

Year	Entrant	Class	Car	Engine	1	2	3	4	5	6	7	8	9	Rank	Pts
2013	Aston Martin Racing	LMGTE Pro	Aston Martin Vantage GTE	Aston Martin 4.5 L V8	SIL; 3	SPA; 6	LMS; Ret	**SÃO**; 11	COA; Ret	FUJ	SHA	BHR		?	?
2014	Aston Martin Racing	LMGTE Am	Aston Martin Vantage GTE	Aston Martin 4.5 L V8	SIL; 2	SPA; 3	LMS; 5	COA; 1	**FUJ**; 2	**SHA**; 1	BHR; 3	**SÃO**; 1		2nd	164
2015	Aston Martin Racing	LMGTE Am	Aston Martin Vantage GTE	Aston Martin 4.5 L V8	**SIL**; 1	**SPA**; 1	**LMS**; NC	NÜR; 2	COA; 5	FUJ; 2	**SHA**; 2	**BHR**; 1		3rd	144
2016	Aston Martin Racing	LMGTE Am	Aston Martin Vantage GTE	Aston Martin 4.5 L V8	SIL; 2	**SPA**; 1	**LMS**; Ret	NÜR; 1	MEX; Ret	**COA**; 1	**FUJ**; 1	**SHA**; 1	**BHR**; Ret	3rd	149
2017	Aston Martin Racing	LMGTE Am	Aston Martin Vantage GTE	Aston Martin 4.5 L V8	**SIL**; 2	**SPA**; 1	**LMS**; 4	**NÜR**; 3	MEX; 2	**COA**; 1	FUJ; 5	**SHA**; 1	**BHR**; 1	1st	192
2018–19	Aston Martin Racing	LMGTE Am	Aston Martin Vantage GTE	Aston Martin 4.5 L V8	SPA; 1	LMS; Ret	SIL; 4	**FUJ**; 3	**SHA**; 5	SEB; 8	SPA; 6	LMS; Ret		8th	77
2019–20	Aston Martin Racing	LMGTE Am	Aston Martin Vantage AMR	Mercedes-Benz M177 4.0L Turbo V8	SIL; 2	FUJ; 11	SHA; 3	BHR; 2	COA; 2	SPA; 9	LMS; 6	BHR; 9		7th	100.5
2021	Aston Martin Racing	LMGTE Am	Aston Martin Vantage AMR	Aston Martin 4.0 L Turbo V8	SPA; 6	ALG; 4	MNZ; 2	LMS; Ret	BHR; 4	BHR; 10				8th	58
2022	Northwest AMR	LMGTE Am	Aston Martin Vantage AMR	Aston Martin 4.0 L Turbo V8	SEB; 1	SPA; 3	LMS; 2	MNZ; 8	FUJ; 5	BHR; 5				2nd	118
2023	Northwest AMR	LMGTE Am	Aston Martin Vantage AMR	Aston Martin 4.0 L Turbo V8	SEB; 11	PRT; 13	SPA	LMS	MNZ	FUJ	BHR			29th	0

=== 24 Hours of Le Mans results ===
Year	Team	Co-Drivers	Car	Class	Laps	Pos.	Class Pos.
2013	(United Kingdom) Aston Martin Racing	(United States) Bill Auberlen (Portugal) Pedro Lamy	Aston Martin Vantage GTE	GTE; Pro	221	DNF	DNF
2014	(United Kingdom) Aston Martin Racing	(Portugal) Pedro Lamy (Denmark) Christoffer Nygaard	Aston Martin Vantage GTE	GTE; Am	329	26th	6th
2015	(United Kingdom) Aston Martin Racing	(Portugal) Pedro Lamy (Austria) Mathias Lauda	Aston Martin Vantage GTE	GTE; Am	321	NC	NC
2016	(United Kingdom) Aston Martin Racing	(Portugal) Pedro Lamy (Austria) Mathias Lauda	Aston Martin Vantage GTE	GTE; Am	281	DNF	DNF
2017	(United Kingdom) Aston Martin Racing	(Portugal) Pedro Lamy (Austria) Mathias Lauda	Aston Martin Vantage GTE	GTE; Am	329	36th	8th
2018	(United Kingdom) Aston Martin Racing	(Portugal) Pedro Lamy (Austria) Mathias Lauda	Aston Martin Vantage GTE	GTE; Am	92	DNF	DNF
2019	(United Kingdom) Aston Martin Racing	(Portugal) Pedro Lamy (Austria) Mathias Lauda	Aston Martin Vantage GTE	GTE; Am	87	DNF	DNF
2020	(United Kingdom) Aston Martin Racing	(Brazil) Augusto Farfus (United Kingdom) Ross Gunn	Aston Martin Vantage AMR	GTE; Am	333	33rd	8th
2021	(United Kingdom) Aston Martin Racing	(Brazil) Marcos Gomes (Denmark) Nicki Thiim	Aston Martin Vantage AMR	GTE; Am	45	DNF	DNF
2022	(Canada) Northwest AMR	(United Kingdom) David Pittard (Denmark) Nicki Thiim	Aston Martin Vantage AMR	GTE; Am	342	36th	**3rd**

=== Complete WeatherTech SportsCar Championship results ===
(key) (Races in bold indicate pole position; results in italics indicate fastest lap)

Year	Team	Class	Make	Engine	1	2	3	4	5	6	7	8	9	10	11	12	Pos.	Points	Ref
2014	Aston Martin Racing	GTLM	Aston Martin Vantage GTE	Aston Martin 4.5 V8	DAY; 8	SEB	LBH	LGA	WGL	MOS	IMS	ELK	VIR	COA	PET		40th	24	
2014	Turner Motorsport	GTD	BMW Z4 GT3	BMW 4.4 L V8 V8	DAY; 7	SEB; 7	LGA	BEL	WGL	MOS	IMS	ELK	VIR; 1	AUS	ATL		47th	43	
2015	Aston Martin Racing	GTLM	Aston Martin Vantage GTE	Aston Martin 4.5 V8	DAY; 6	SEB; 6	LBH	LGA	WGL	MOS	ELK	VIR	COA	PET			19th	52	
2016	Aston Martin Racing	GTD	Aston Martin Vantage GT3	Aston Martin 6.0 V12	DAY; 4	SEB; 10	LGA	DET	WGL	MOS	LIM	ELK	VIR	COA	PET		28th	51	
2017	Aston Martin Racing	GTD	Aston Martin Vantage GT3	Aston Martin 6.0 V12	DAY; 12	SEB	LBH	COA	DET	WGL	MOS	LIM	ELK	VIR	LGA	PET	69th	19	
2018	Spirit of Race	GTD	Ferrari 488 GT3	Ferrari F154CB 3.9 Turbo V8	DAY; 21	SEB; 12	MDO	DET	WGL	MOS	LIM	ELK	VIR	LGA	PET		48th	29	
2019	Spirit of Race	GTD	Ferrari 488 GT3	Ferrari F154CB 3.9 Turbo V8	DAY; 20	SEB	MDO	DET	WGL	MOS	LIM	ELK	VIR	LGA	PET		67th	11	
2022	Northwest AMR	GTD	Aston Martin Vantage AMR GT3	Aston Martin 4.0 L Turbo V8	DAY; 12	SEB	LBH	LGA	MDO	DET	WGL	MOS	LIM	ELK	VIR	PET	61st	211	

Sporting positions
Preceded by Emmanuel Collard; François Perrodo; Rui Águas	FIA Endurance Trophy for LMGTE Am Drivers; 2017; With: Pedro Lamy & Mathias Lauda	Succeeded by Jörg Bergmeister; Patrick Lindsey; Egidio Perfetti
