= Patrick Lindsey =

American racing driver (born 1982)

- Nationality: (United States) American
- Born: April 22, 1982 (age 44) Dallas, Texas, U.S.

FIA World Endurance Championship career
- Current team: Dempsey-Proton Racing
- Categorisation: FIA Silver
- Car number: 88
- Former teams: Team Project 1
- Starts: 12
- Wins: 2
- Poles: 4
- Fastest laps: 0
- Best finish: 1st GTE Am in 2018-19

Patrick Lindsey (born April 22, 1982) is an American racing driver, team owner and businessman. Outside racing, he serves as president of the air transport company Mira Vista Aviation.

== Career ==
Lindsey's started his motorsport career in Bakersfield, California, where he used an old race truck in a drag race. In 2013, he drove together with his teammate Patrick Long in the Rolex Sports Car Series on a Porsche 997.

=== FIA World Endurance Championship ===
In the 2018-19 FIA WEC season, Lindsey drove for the Team Project 1 on a Porsche 911 GT3 RSR. At the 2018 24 Hours of Le Mans, he raced alongside his teammates Jörg Bergmeister and Egidio Perfetti. Lindsey, Bergmeister, and Perfetti won the 6 Hours of Fuji in the LMGTE Am category. They also won the 2019 24 Hours of Le Mans in the same category, clinching the LMGTE Am championship in the process.

Lindsey returned to the FIA WEC in 2022 season, representing Dempsey-Proton Racing.

== Racing record ==
=== Complete 24 Hours of Le Mans results ===
Year	Team	Co-Drivers	Car	Class	Laps	Pos.	Class Pos.
2018	(Germany) Team Project 1	(Norway) Egidio Perfetti (Germany) Jörg Bergmeister	Porsche 911 RSR	GTE; Am	332	34th	7th
2019	(Germany) Team Project 1	(Norway) Egidio Perfetti (Germany) Jörg Bergmeister	Porsche 911 RSR	GTE; Am	334	31st	**1st**

=== Complete FIA World Endurance Championship results ===
(key) (Races in bold indicate pole position; races in italics indicate fastest lap)

Year	Entrant	Class	Car	Engine	1	2	3	4	5	6	7	8	Rank	Points
2018–19	Team Project 1	LMGTE Am	Porsche 911 RSR	Porsche 4.0L Flat-6	SPA; 9	LMS; 3	**SIL**; 3	FUJ; 1	SHA; 2	SEB; 3	SPA; 5	LMS; 1	1st	151
2022	Dempsey-Proton Racing	LMGTE Am	Porsche 911 RSR-19	Porsche 4.2L Flat-6	SEB; 10	SPA; 9	LMS	MNZ; 6	FUJ; 9	BHR; 12			23rd	14

^{*} Season still in progress.

=== IMSA SportsCar Championship results ===
(key)

Year	Team	Class	Car	Engine	1	2	3	4	5	6	7	8	9	10	11	12	Rank	Points	Ref
2014	Park Place Motorsports	GTD	Porsche 911 GT America	Porsche 4.0 L Flat-6	DAY; 13	SEB; 17	LGA; 9	DET; 18	WGL; 18	MOS; 2	IMS; 10	ELK; 10	VIR; 17	COA; 10	PET; 13		20th	173	
2015	Park Place Motorsports	GTD	Porsche 911 GT America	Porsche 4.0 L Flat-6	DAY; 16	SIR; 12	**LGA**; **1**	BEL; 5	WGL; 11	LIM; 6	ELK; 3	VIR; 10	AUS; 5	PET; 1			5th	266	
2016	Park Place Motorsports	GTD	Porsche 911 GT3 R	Porsche 4.0L Flat-6	DAY; 17	SEB; 17	LGA; 11	BEL; 2	WGL; 8	MOS; 6	LIM; 10	ELK; 2	VIR	AUS; 5	PET; 12		11th	203	
2017	Park Place Motorsports	GTD	Porsche 911 GT3 R	Porsche 4.0L Flat-6	DAY; 24	SEB; 6	LBH; 4	AUS; 8	BEL; 9	WGL; 8	MOS; 9	LIM; 1	ELK; 2	VIR; 10	LGA; 3	PET; 3	3rd	298	
2018	Park Place Motorsports	GTD	Porsche 911 GT3 R	Porsche 4.0L Flat-6	DAY; 18	SEB; 9	MOH	BEL	WGL; 6	MOS	LIM	ELK; 11	VIR	LGA; 2	PET		16th	112	
2019	Park Place Motorsports	GTD	Porsche 911 GT3 R	Porsche 4.0L Flat-6	DAY; 7	SEB; 6	MDO	DET	WGL; 13	MOS; 4	LIM	ELK; 15	VIR; 5	LAG; DNS	PET		15th	137	

Sporting positions
Preceded by Pedro Lamy; Mathias Lauda; Paul Dalla Lana	FIA Endurance Trophy for LMGTE Am Drivers; 2018-19; With: Jörg Bergmeister & Egidio Perfetti	Succeeded by Emmanuel Collard; François Perrodo; Nicklas Nielsen
