= Mathias Lauda =

Austrian racing driver (born 1981)

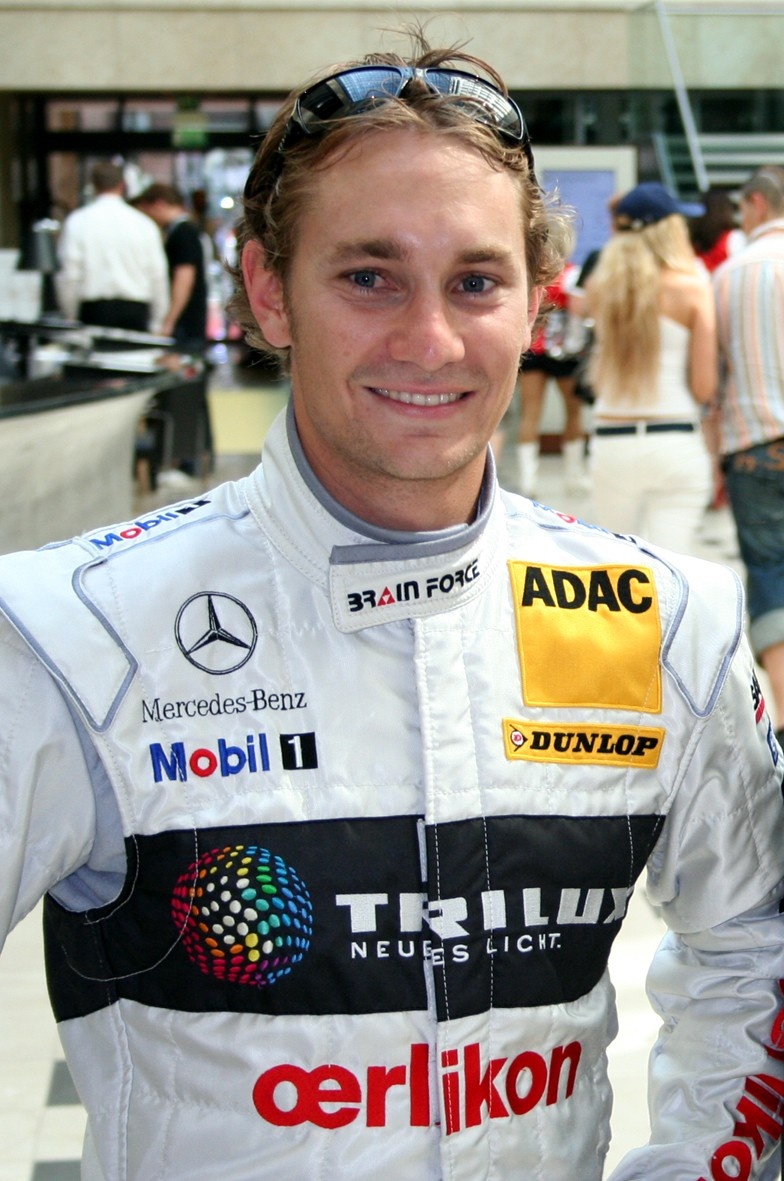
- Nationality: (Austria) Austrian
- Born: 30 January 1981 (age 45) Salzburg, Austria
- Relatives: Niki Lauda (father)

FIA World Endurance Championship career
- Debut season: 2015
- Current team: Aston Martin Racing
- Categorisation: FIA Gold (until 2014); FIA Silver (2015–)
- Car number: 98
- Starts: 34
- Wins: 13
- Poles: 20
- Fastest laps: 1
- Best finish: 1st in 2017

Previous series
- 2014-16 2012 2010-11 2006-09 2005–06 2005 2004 2004 2002-03: NASCAR Whelen Euro Series; FIA GT1 World Championship; Porsche Supercup; Deutsche Tourenwagen Masters; A1 Grand Prix; GP2 Series; International Formula 3000; Euro Formula 3000; World Series Lights

Mathias Lauda (born 30 January 1981) is an Austrian racing driver notable for winning the 2017 FIA World Endurance Championship for Aston Martin Racing in the LMGTE Am category. He is the son of the late three-time Formula One world champion Niki Lauda and his first wife, Marlene Knaus. He has a brother, Lukas, who was his manager during his racing career.

== Early career ==
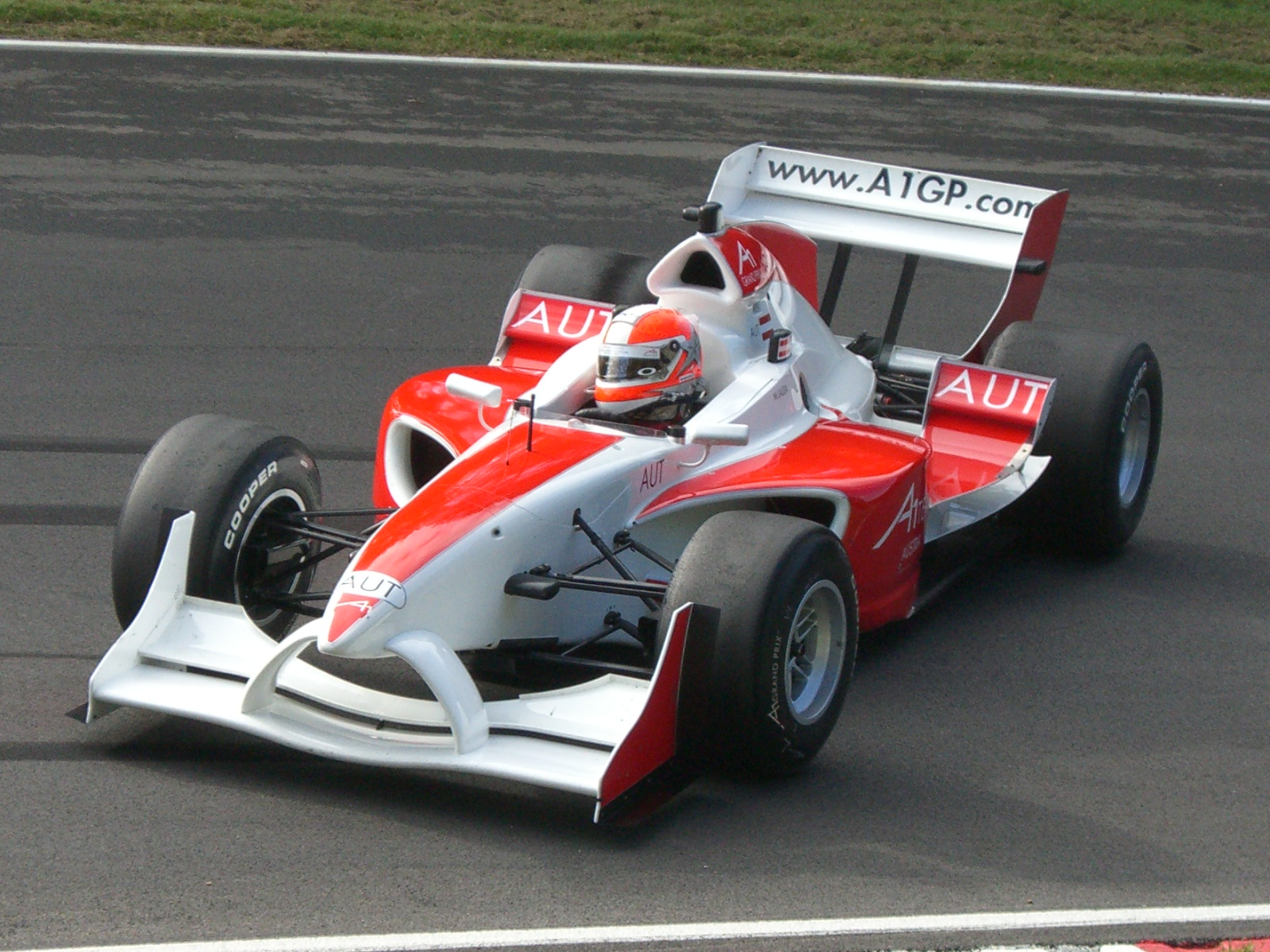
Lauda driving for A1 Team Austria at Brands Hatch during the 2005-06 A1 Grand Prix season.

Lauda was born during his father's temporary retirement from F1. Unlike many drivers, who start out in karting, Lauda debuted in 2002 in Formula Nissan 2000, having been forbidden to begin racing by his father until the age of 21. He also drove in two races of German Formula VW and one race of Spanish Formula Three. He moved to World Series Lights in 2003 with the Vergani team, again moving in 2004 to the Euro Formula 3000 Series. Later in 2004, he drove in Formula 3000, completing the full season with the Coloni Motorsport team and finishing 13th in the standings.

The following year, Lauda remained with Coloni alongside former Formula One driver Gianmaria Bruni to drive in the newly-christened GP2 Series, though he would only take a sole points finish — a sixth place in Monaco. He also represented A1 Team Austria in the 2005-06 A1 Grand Prix season.

== Touring and sports car career ==
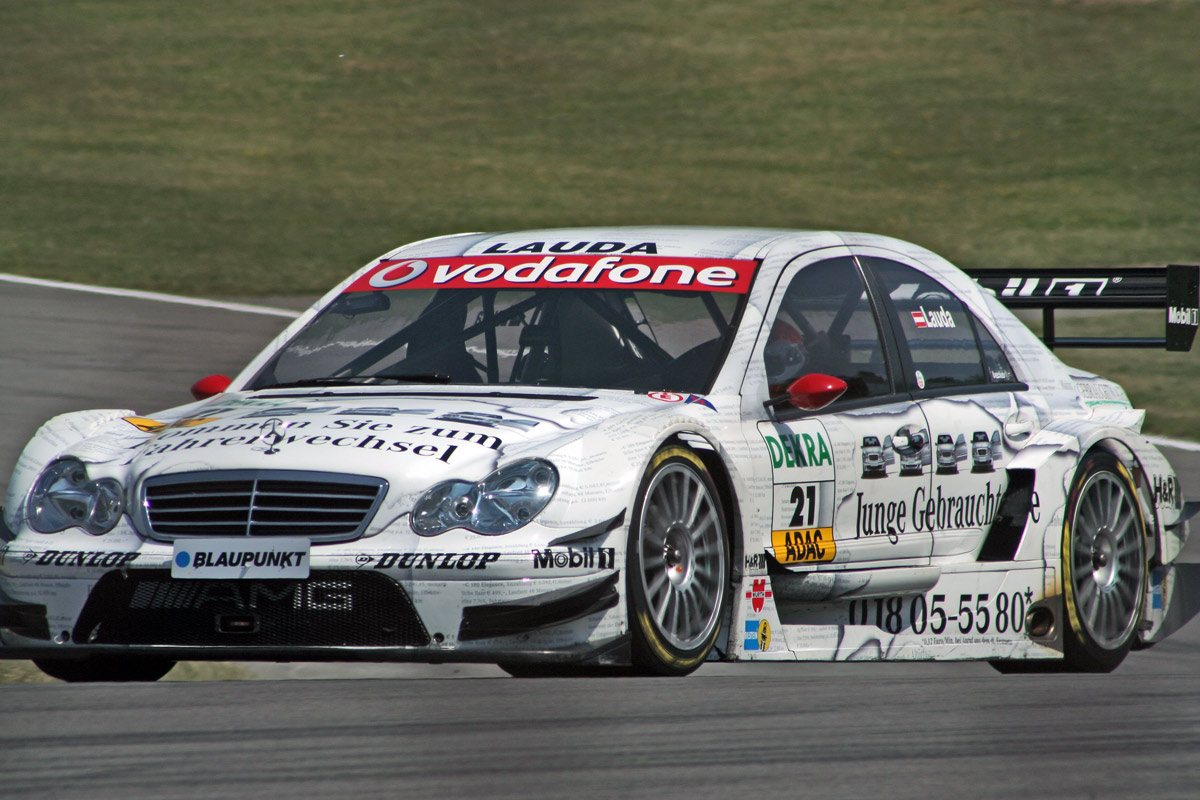
Lauda driving for Mercedes-Benz (Persson Motorsport) in the 2006 Deutsche Tourenwagen Masters season.

Lauda decided to turn his attention to touring cars from 2006 onwards, competing in the Deutsche Tourenwagen Masters for Persson Motorsport. After a scoreless debut campaign he moved to Mücke Motorsport in 2007, where two top-eight finishes brought him to 15th in the standings. Lauda returned to Persson for the 2008 season, where he took a lone point at the Norisring. After another one-point season in 2009, one which he contested with Mücke, Lauda left the series. He drove in a lone race of the Porsche Supercup in 2010 before embarking on a full-time campaign in 2011 with Konrad Motorsport. He ended the year 12th in the championship.

In 2012, Lauda joined Michael Bartels' Vita4One Racing Team in the FIA GT1 World Championship, where he finished 12th in the standings alongside Nikolaus Mayr-Melnhof in a BMW Z4 GT3 (Bartels himself finished third that season). In addition, Lauda came third in the 2012 Spa 24 Hours, again in a Vita4One-entered BMW.

After a year out of racing in 2013, Lauda drove for DF1 Racing in the 2014 NASCAR Whelen Euro Series, where he won at Tours Speedway in the series's first oval race held in wet conditions. He then raced alongside Freddie Hunt (son of James Hunt, his father's title rival in the 1976 Formula One season) in the MRF Challenge during the winter, where the Austrian won the final Bahrain race. This ended up being a pathway for his career going forward, as the win attracted the attention of fellow racing driver and friend Pedro Lamy, who got Lauda into contact with Aston Martin Racing, whom he would join in the LMGTE Am class of the 2015 FIA World Endurance Championship as a silver-ranked driver. Along with Lamy and Paul Dalla Lana, Lauda won three races, including his debut appearance at Silverstone, though a non-score at Le Mans prevented the trio from claiming the title — they ended the season third in points.

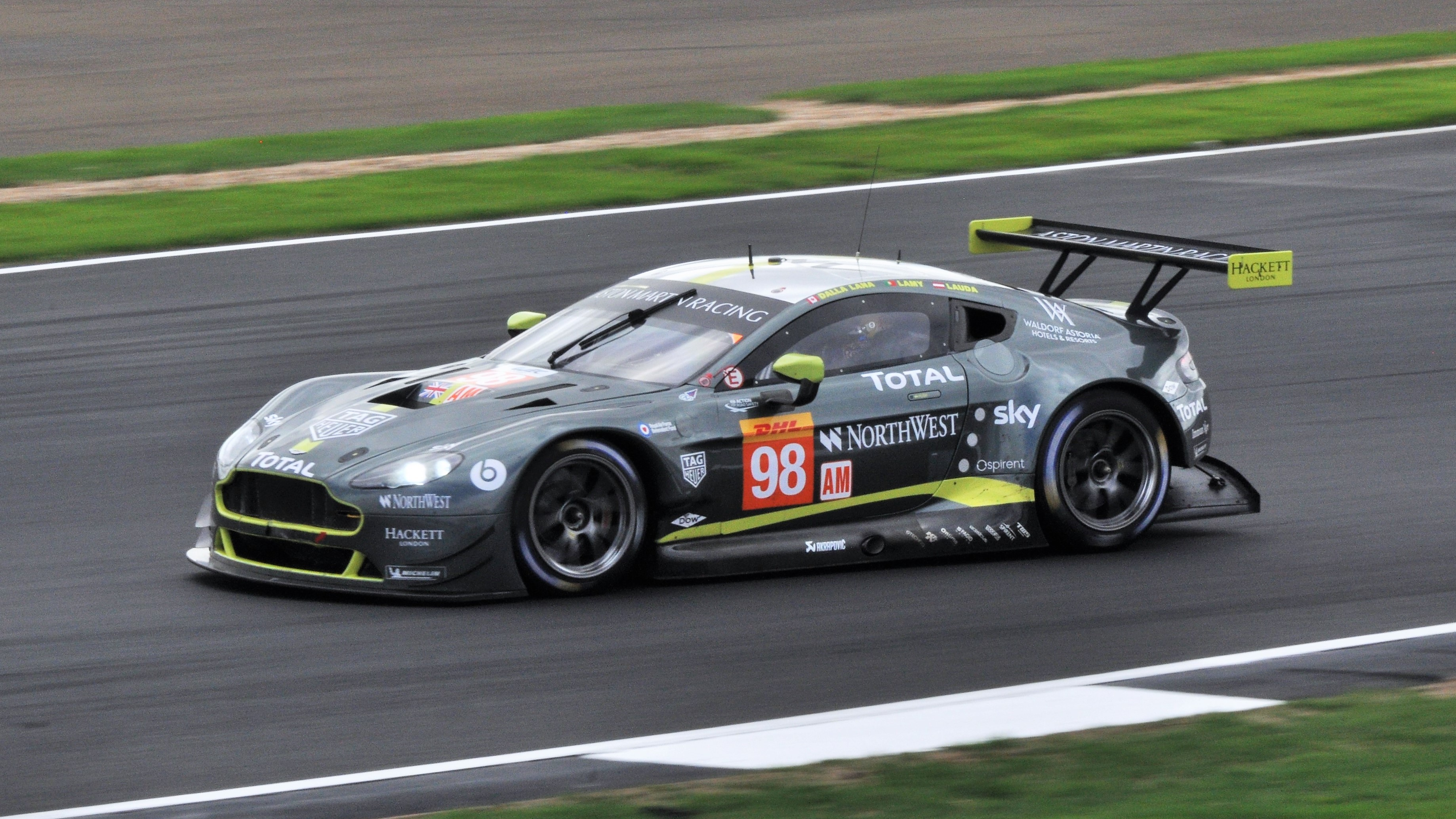
Lauda racing in the 2018 6 Hours of Silverstone.

For 2016, Lauda remained part of the lineup. This time, the season proved to be patchy, as a total of five wins was cancelled out by three retirements, including another one at Le Mans where Lauda suffered a gearbox failure. The trio once again ended the year in third place overall, with a blown engine at the season finale in Bahrain ending their title hunt. Going into their third season as teammates in 2017, Lauda, Lamy, and Dalla Lana laid the groundwork for another championship challenge with a second place in Silverstone, a dominant victory at Spa and a points finish at the 24 Hours of Le Mans. More podiums followed in the coming three races, bookended by a win in Austin. The team rounded the year off with successive triumphs in China and Bahrain, thereby clinching the LMGTE Am title. With a win at Spa the team began the 2018–19 "Super Season" well, though this would end up being one of just two podium finishes that season, as Lauda and his teammates finished seventh in the teams' standings.

== Racing record ==
=== Career summary ===
Season	Series	Team	Races	Poles	Wins	FLaps	Podiums	Points	Position
2002	Formula Nissan 2000	Epsilon by Graff	14	0	0	0	0	23	12th
2002	Spanish Formula Three Championship	GTA Motor Competición	1	0	0	0	0	0	NC
2003	World Series Lights	Vergani Racing	16	0	0	0	2	85	8th
2004	Euro Formula 3000	Traini Corse	8	1	0	0	1	9	9th
2004	International Formula 3000	CMS Performance	10	0	0	0	0	5	13th
2005	GP2 Series	Coloni Motorsport	23	0	0	0	0	3	21st
2005–06	A1 Grand Prix	A1 Team Austria	20	0	0	0	0	14	19th
2006	Deutsche Tourenwagen Masters	Persson Motorsport	10	0	0	0	0	0	18th
2007	Deutsche Tourenwagen Masters	Mücke Motorsport	10	0	0	0	0	4	15th
2008	Deutsche Tourenwagen Masters	Persson Motorsport	11	0	0	0	0	1	15th
2008	Speedcar Series	GPC Squadra Corse	4	0	0	0	2	18	7th
2008–09	Speedcar Series	Phoenix Racing	1	0	0	0	0	0	NC
2009	Deutsche Tourenwagen Masters	Mücke Motorsport	10	0	0	0	0	1	15th
2010	Porsche Supercup	Porsche AG	1	0	0	0	0	0	NC
2011	Porsche Supercup	Konrad Motorsport Austria	11	0	0	0	0	40	11th
2011	Volkswagen Scirocco R-Cup	N/A	1	0	0	0	0	0	NC†
2012	FIA GT1 World Championship	Vita4One Racing Team	18	0	0	0	2	56	12th
2012	Blancpain Endurance Series - GT3 Pro	Vita4One Racing Team	4	0	0	0	2	45	11th
2012	24 Hours of Nürburgring - SP9	BMW Team Vita4One	1	0	0	0	0	N/A	DNF
2012	Volkswagen Scirocco R-Cup	N/A	1	0	0	0	0	0	NC†
2014	NASCAR Whelen Euro Series	DF1 Racing by B66 Raceconsulting	12	0	1	1	1	523	9th
2014	ADAC GT Masters	HTP Motorsport	4	0	0	0	0	5	38th
2014–15	MRF Challenge Formula 2000	MRF Racing	8	1	0	0	1	71	6th
2015	FIA World Endurance Championship - LMGTE Am	Aston Martin Racing	8	1	0	1	6	144	**3rd**
2015	24 Hours of Le Mans - LMGTE Am	Aston Martin Racing	1	0	0	0	0	N/A	NC
2015	United SportsCar Championship - GTLM	Aston Martin Racing	2	0	0	0	0	52	19th
2015	24 Hours of Nürburgring - SP9	Aston Martin Racing	1	0	0	0	0	N/A	DNF
2015	NASCAR Whelen Euro Series	DF1 Racing by B66 Raceconsulting	2	0	0	0	0	147	23rd
2016	FIA World Endurance Championship - LMGTE Am	Aston Martin Racing	9	0	0	0	6	149	**3rd**
2016	24 Hours of Le Mans - LMGTE Am	Aston Martin Racing	1	0	0	0	0	N/A	DNF
2016	WeatherTech SportsCar Championship - GTD	Aston Martin Racing	2	0	0	0	0	51	31st
2016	24 Hours of Nürburgring - SP9	Aston Martin Racing	1	0	0	0	0	N/A	DNF
2016	NASCAR Whelen Euro Series	DF1 Racing	2	0	0	0	0	64	32nd
2017	FIA World Endurance Championship - LMGTE Am	Aston Martin Racing	9	1	4	0	7	192	**1st**
2017	24 Hours of Le Mans - LMGTE Am	Aston Martin Racing	1	0	0	0	0	N/A	8th
2017	WeatherTech SportsCar Championship - GTD	Aston Martin Racing	1	0	0	0	0	19	69th
2017	Intercontinental GT Challenge	HTP Motorsport	1	0	0	0	0	0	NC
2018	WeatherTech SportsCar Championship - GTD	Squadra Corse Garage Italia	2	0	0	0	0	29	52nd
2018	Intercontinental GT Challenge	Audi Sport Team WRT	1	0	0	0	0	1	25th
2018	24 Hours of Le Mans - LMGTE Am	Aston Martin Racing	1	0	0	0	0	N/A	DNF
2018–19	FIA World Endurance Championship - LMGTE Am	Aston Martin Racing	8	0	0	0	2	77	8th
2019	24 Hours of Le Mans - LMGTE Am	Aston Martin Racing	1	0	0	0	0	N/A	DNF
2019	WeatherTech SportsCar Championship - GTD	Spirit of Race	1	0	0	0	0	11	67th
2019	Intercontinental GT Challenge	Spirit of Race	1	0	0	0	0	4	34th
2020	European Le Mans Series - GTE	Aston Martin Racing	2	0	0	0	1	0	NC†
2020	WeatherTech SportsCar Championship - GTD	Aston Martin Racing	1	0	0	0	0	14	58th
2020	GT World Challenge Europe Endurance Cup	JP Motorsport	2	0	0	0	0	0	NC

† Guest driver ineligible to score points

=== Complete Nissan World Series Lights results ===
(key) (Races in bold indicate pole position; races in italics indicate fastest lap.)

Year	Entrant	1	2	3	4	5	6	7	8	9	10	11	12	13	14	15	16	DC	Points
2002	Epsilon by Graff	VAL; 1 Ret	VAL; 2; 8	JAR; 1; 7	JAR; 2 Ret	ALB; 1 Ret	ALB; 2 Ret	MNZ; 1; 12	MNZ; 2; 10	MAG; 1; 5	MAG; 2; 12	CAT; 1 Ret	CAT; 2 Ret	VAL; 1; 8	VAL; 2; 7			12th	23
2003	Vergani Racing	MNZ; 1; 4	MNZ; 2; 3	LAU; 1; 5	LAU; 2; 7	MAG; 1; 5	MAG; 2; 7	A1R; 1; 3	A1R; 2 Ret	CAT; 1 Ret	CAT; 2; 10	VAL; 1 Ret	VAL; 2; 5	ALB; 1; 9	ALB; 2; 9	JAR; 1; 6	JAR; 2; 5	8th	85

=== Complete Euro Formula 3000 results ===
(key) (Races in bold indicate pole position; races in italics indicate fastest lap.)

Year	Entrant	1	2	3	4	5	6	7	8	9	10	DC	Points
2004	Traini Corse	BRN; Ret	EST	JER; 2	**MNZ**; Ret	SPA; Ret	DON; 7	DIJ	ZOL; 4	NÜR1; 7	NÜR2; Ret	9th	9

=== Complete International Formula 3000 results ===
(key) (Races in bold indicate pole position; races in italics indicate fastest lap.)

Year	Entrant	1	2	3	4	5	6	7	8	9	10	DC	Points
2004	CMS Performance	IMO; 12	CAT; 7	MON; Ret	NUR; 10	MAG; Ret	SIL; 13	HOC; Ret	HUN; Ret	SPA; 14	MNZ; 6	13th	5

=== Complete GP2 Series results ===
(key) (Races in bold indicate pole position) (Races in italics indicate fastest lap)

Year	Entrant	1	2	3	4	5	6	7	8	9	10	11	12	13	14	15	16	17	18	19	20	21	22	23	DC	Points
2005	Coloni Motorsport	IMO; FEA; 12	IMO; SPR; Ret	CAT; FEA; Ret	CAT; SPR; 13	MON; FEA; 6	NÜR; FEA; 10	NÜR; SPR; Ret	MAG; FEA; 16	MAG; SPR; 15	SIL; FEA; 20	SIL; SPR; 15	HOC; FEA; 14	HOC; SPR; 21	HUN; FEA; Ret	HUN; SPR; 14	IST; FEA; 16	IST; SPR; 18	MNZ; FEA; 13	MNZ; SPR; 12	SPA; FEA; 9	SPA; SPR; 24	BHR; FEA; 14	BHR; SPR; 21	21st	3

=== Complete A1 Grand Prix results ===
(key) (Races in bold indicate pole position) (Races in italics indicate fastest lap)

Year	Entrant	1	2	3	4	5	6	7	8	9	10	11	12	13	14	15	16	17	18	19	20	21	22	DC	Points	Ref
2005–06	Austria	GBR; SPR; 20	GBR; FEA; 11	GER; SPR; 13	GER; FEA; 15	POR; SPR; 16	POR; FEA; 10	AUS; SPR; 19	AUS; FEA; Ret	MYS; SPR; 18	MYS; FEA; Ret	UAE; SPR; 17	UAE; FEA; 7	RSA; SPR; 16	RSA; FEA; 7	IDN; SPR; 13	IDN; FEA; Ret	MEX; SPR	MEX; FEA	USA; SPR; 12	USA; FEA; 9	CHN; SPR; Ret	CHN; FEA; 13	19th	14	

=== Complete Deutsche Tourenwagen Masters results ===
(key) (Races in bold indicate pole position) (Races in italics indicate fastest lap)

Year	Team	Car	1	2	3	4	5	6	7	8	9	10	11	Pos	Points
2006	Persson Motorsport	AMG-Mercedes C-Klasse 2004	HOC; 11	LAU; 14	OSC; 16	BRH; 15	NOR; Ret	NÜR; 13	ZAN; 15	CAT; 13	BUG; Ret	HOC; 10		17th	0
2007	Mücke Motorsport	AMG-Mercedes C-Klasse 2005	HOC; 13	OSC; 13	LAU; 7	BRH; 12	NOR; 11	MUG; 12†	ZAN; 15	NÜR; 11	CAT; 6	HOC; 11		15th	4
2008	Persson Motorsport	AMG-Mercedes C-Klasse 2007	HOC; 15	OSC; 13	MUG; 16	LAU; 12	NOR; 8	ZAN; 13	NÜR; 10	BRH; 16	CAT; Ret	BUG; 15	HOC; Ret	15th	1
2009	Mücke Motorsport	AMG-Mercedes C-Klasse 2008	HOC; 10	LAU; 9	NOR; 14	ZAN; Ret	OSC; 12	NÜR; 9	BRH; 20†	CAT; 11	DIJ; 8	HOC; 14		15th	1
Sources:

- † — Retired, but was classified as he completed 90% of the winner's race distance.

=== Complete Porsche Supercup results ===
(key) (Races in bold indicate pole position) (Races in italics indicate fastest lap)

Year	Team	1	2	3	4	5	6	7	8	9	10	11	DC	Points
2010	Porsche AG	BHR	BHR	CAT	MON	ESP	SIL	HOC; 20	HUN	SPA	MNZ		NC‡	0‡
2011	Konrad Motorsport Austria	IST; 15	CAT; 14	MON; 15	NNS; 14	SIL; 18	NÜR; 11	HUN; 11	SPA; Ret	MNZ; 14	UAE; 13	UAE; 10	12th	40

‡ Not eligible for points for entering as a guest driver.

=== Complete GT1 World Championship results ===
Year	Team	Car	1	2	3	4	5	6	7	8	9	10	11	12	13	14	15	16	17	18	Pos	Points
2012	BMW Team Vita4One	BMW E89 Z4 GT3	NOG; QR; 12	NOG; CR; 11	ZOL; QR; 5	ZOL; CR; 14	NAV; QR; 7	NAV; QR; 6	SVK; QR; 10	SVK; CR; 7	ALG; QR; 5	ALG; CR; 8	SVK; QR; 2	SVK; CR; 3	MOS; QR; 7	MOS; CR; 10	NÜR; QR; 9	NÜR; CR; 5	DON; QR; 8	DON; CR; Ret	12th	56

=== Complete FIA World Endurance Championship results ===
Year	Entrant	Class	Car	Engine	1	2	3	4	5	6	7	8	9	Rank	Points
2015	Aston Martin Racing	LMGTE Am	Aston Martin Vantage GTE	Aston Martin 4.5 L V8	**SIL**; 1	**SPA**; 1	**LMS**; NC	NÜR; 2	COA; 5	FUJ; 2	**SHA**; 2	**BHR**; 1		3rd	144
2016	Aston Martin Racing	LMGTE Am	Aston Martin Vantage GTE	Aston Martin 4.5 L V8	SIL; 2	**SPA**; 1	**LMS**; Ret	NÜR; 1	MEX; Ret	**COA**; 1	**FUJ**; 1	**SHA**; 1	**BHR**; Ret	3rd	149
2017	Aston Martin Racing	LMGTE Am	Aston Martin Vantage GTE	Aston Martin 4.5 L V8	**SIL**; 2	**SPA**; 1	**LMS**; 4	**NÜR**; 3	MEX; 2	**COA**; 1	FUJ; 5	**SHA**; 1	**BHR**; 1	1st	192
2018–19	Aston Martin Racing	LMGTE Am	Aston Martin Vantage GTE	Aston Martin 4.5 L V8	SPA; 1	LMS; Ret	SIL; 4	**FUJ**; 3	**SHA**; 5	SEB; 8	SPA; 6	LMS; Ret		8th	77

=== 24 Hours of Le Mans results ===
Year	Team	Co-Drivers	Car	Class	Laps	Pos.	Class Pos.
2015	(United Kingdom) Aston Martin Racing	(Canada) Paul Dalla Lana (Portugal) Pedro Lamy	Aston Martin Vantage GTE	GTE; Am	321	NC	NC
2016	(United Kingdom) Aston Martin Racing	(Canada) Paul Dalla Lana (Portugal) Pedro Lamy	Aston Martin Vantage GTE	GTE; Am	281	DNF	DNF
2017	(United Kingdom) Aston Martin Racing	(Canada) Paul Dalla Lana (Portugal) Pedro Lamy	Aston Martin Vantage GTE	GTE; Am	329	36th	8th
2018	(United Kingdom) Aston Martin Racing	(Canada) Paul Dalla Lana (Portugal) Pedro Lamy	Aston Martin Vantage GTE	GTE; Am	92	DNF	DNF
2019	(United Kingdom) Aston Martin Racing	(Canada) Paul Dalla Lana (Portugal) Pedro Lamy	Aston Martin Vantage GTE	GTE; Am	87	DNF	DNF

=== Complete WeatherTech SportsCar Championship results ===
(key) (Races in bold indicate pole position) (Races in italics indicate fastest lap)

Year	Team	Class	Make	Engine	1	2	3	4	5	6	7	8	9	10	11	12	Pos.	Points	Ref
2015	Aston Martin Racing	GTLM	Aston Martin Vantage GTE	Aston Martin 4.5 V8	DAY; 6	SEB; 6	LBH	LGA	WGL	MOS	ELK	VIR	COA	PET			19th	52	
2016	Aston Martin Racing	GTD	Aston Martin Vantage GT3	Aston Martin 6.0 V12	DAY; 4	SEB; 10	LGA	DET	WGL	MOS	LIM	ELK	VIR	COA	PET		28th	51	
2017	Aston Martin Racing	GTD	Aston Martin Vantage GT3	Aston Martin 6.0 V12	DAY; 12	SEB	LBH	COA	DET	WGL	MOS	LIM	ELK	VIR	LGA	PET	69th	19	
2018	Spirit of Race	GTD	Ferrari 488 GT3	Ferrari F154CB 3.9 Turbo V8	**DAY**; 21	**SEB**; 12	MDO	DET	WGL	MOS	LIM	ELK	VIR	LGA	PET		48th	29	
2019	Spirit of Race	GTD	Ferrari 488 GT3	Ferrari F154CB 3.9 Turbo V8	DAY; 20	SEB	MDO	DET	WGL	MOS	LIM	ELK	VIR	LGA	PET		67th	11	
2020	Aston Martin Racing	GTD	Aston Martin Vantage AMR GT3	Aston Martin 4.0 L Turbo V8	DAY; 17	DAY	SEB	ELK	VIR	ATL	MDO	CLT	PET	LGA	SEB		58th	14	

=== Complete European Le Mans Series results ===
(key) (Races in bold indicate pole position; results in italics indicate fastest lap)

Year	Entrant	Class	Chassis	Engine	1	2	3	4	5	Rank	Points
2020	Aston Martin Racing	LMGTE	Aston Martin Vantage AMR	Aston Martin 4.0 L Turbo V8	LEC; Ret	SPA; 3	LEC	MNZ	ALG	NC†	0†

^{†} As Lauda was a guest driver, he was ineligible for points.

=== NASCAR ===
(key) (Bold – Pole position awarded by qualifying time. Italics – Pole position earned by points standings or practice time. * – Most laps led.)

==== Whelen Euro Series - Elite 1 ====
NASCAR Whelen Euro Series - Elite 1 results
Year	Team	No.	Make	1	2	3	4	5	6	7	8	9	10	11	12	NWES	Pts
2014	DF1 Racing	66	Chevrolet	VAL; 7	VAL; 8	BRH; 7	BRH; 15	TOU; 4	TOU; 1	NÜR; 8	NÜR; 11	UMB; 20	UMB; 10	BUG; 23	BUG; 13	9th	523
2015	DF1 Racing	66	Chevrolet	VAL	VAL	VEN	VEN	BRH	BRH	TOU; 5	TOU; 4	UMB	UMB	ZOL; 22	ZOL; 22	23rd	147
2016	DF1 Racing	66	Chevrolet	VAL; 10	VAL; 14	VEN	VEN	BRH	BRH	TOU	TOU	ADR	ADR	ZOL	ZOL	32nd	64

Sporting positions
Preceded by Emmanuel Collard; François Perrodo; Rui Águas	FIA Endurance Trophy for LMGTE Am Drivers; 2017; With: Pedro Lamy & Paul Dalla Lana	Succeeded by Jörg Bergmeister; Patrick Lindsey; Egidio Perfetti
