= Egidio Perfetti =

Norwegian racing driver (born 1975)

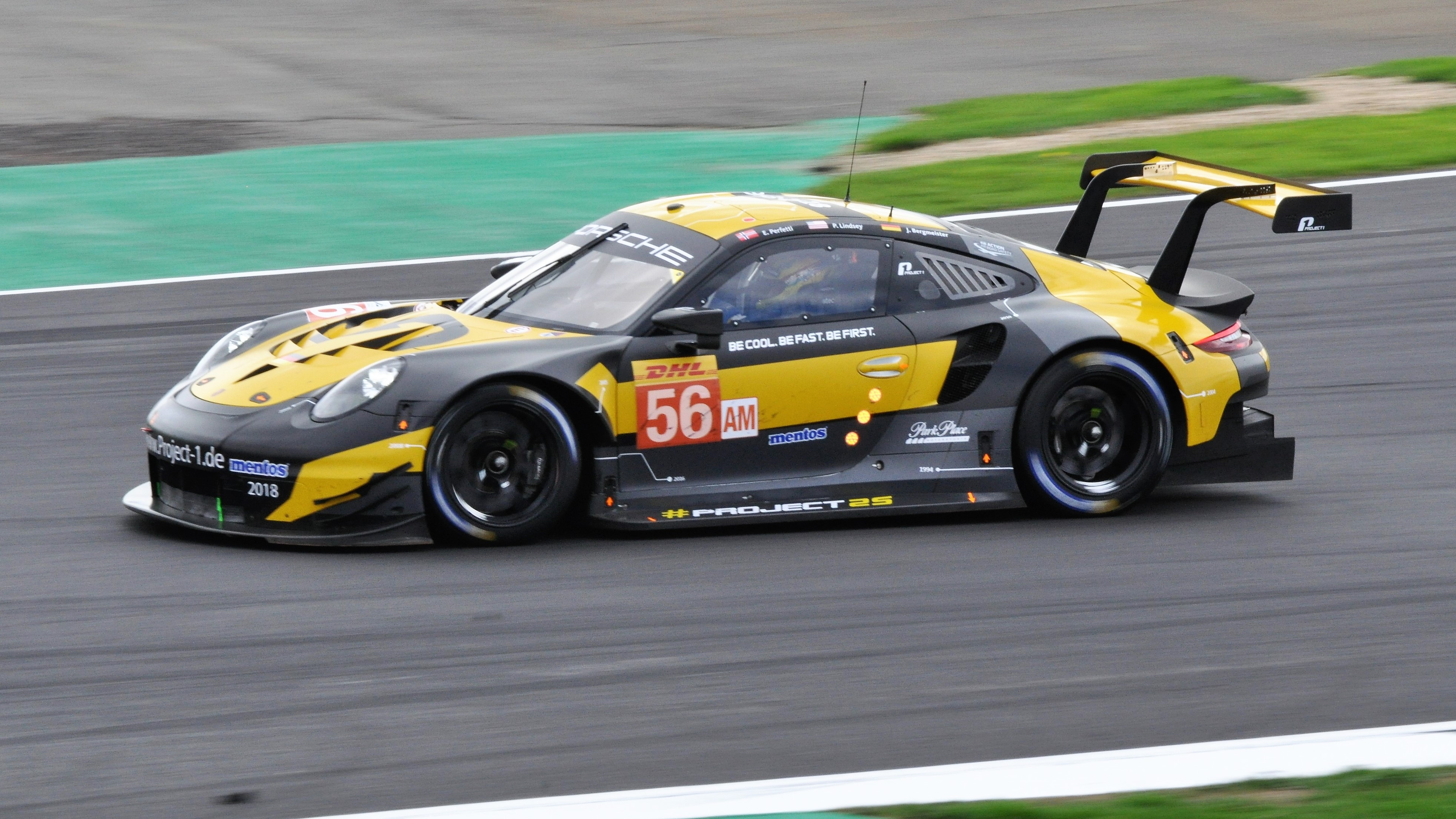
- Nationality: (Norway) Norwegian
- Born: Egidio Alessandro Perfetti; 5 June 1975 (age 51) Sorengo (Switzerland)
- Categorisation: FIA Bronze

Egidio Alessandro Perfetti (born 5 June 1975 in Sorengo) is a Norwegian racing driver. He is also a director in the family business Perfetti Van Melle, which is an Italian global manufacturer of confectionery and gum, dating back to the 1940s. Today it is the third largest group in the world in its sector after Mondelez International and Mars Inc. Mentos is one of the Perfetti Van Melle brands which is often promoted on Perfetti's racing cars.

A cosmopolitan, Perfetti was born in Switzerland to an Italian father and Norwegian mother. After a long spell in Asia, Perfetti now resides in Amsterdam, Netherlands, where the family business head office is located. His nationality is Norwegian and he carries a Norwegian passport.

== Racing career ==
Perfetti started his career in 2010, driving in the Porsche Sports Cup Suisse. During 2012-2015, he was driving in Porsche Carrera Cup Asia. He also appeared in Porsche Carrera Cup France and Porsche Mobil 1 Supercup during 2015. For 2016, he was racing a Porsche in the Michelin Le Mans Cup and also appearing in the Porsche Supercup. He was continuing in the Porsche Mobil 1 Supercup in 2017, while also seen in Porsche Carrera Cup Germany and Porsche Carrera Cup France.

For the 2018-19 FIA WEC 'super season', Perfetti drove a Porsche 911 RSR in the GTE Am Drivers FIA Endurance Trophy class. In 2018, he also drove in the Porsche GT3 Challenge USA and Porsche Mobil 1 Supercup.

=== Complete 24 Hours of Le Mans results ===
| Year | Team | Co-Drivers | Car | Class | Laps | Pos. | Class Pos. |
|---|---|---|---|---|---|---|---|
| 2018 | (Germany) Team Project 1 | (United States) Patrick Lindsey (Germany) Jörg Bergmeister | Porsche 911 RSR | GTE; Am | 332 | 34th | 7th |
| 2019 | (Germany) Team Project 1 | (United States) Patrick Lindsey (Germany) Jörg Bergmeister | Porsche 911 RSR | GTE; Am | 334 | 31st | 1st |
| 2020 | (Germany) Team Project 1 | (Italy) Matteo Cairoli (Netherlands) Larry ten Voorde | Porsche 911 RSR | GTE; Am | 339 | 27th | 4th |
| 2021 | (Germany) Team Project 1 | (Italy) Matteo Cairoli (Italy) Riccardo Pera | Porsche 911 RSR-19 | GTE; Am | 84 | DNF | DNF |

Sporting positions
| Preceded by Pedro Lamy; Mathias Lauda; Paul Dalla Lana | FIA Endurance Trophy for LMGTE Am Drivers; 2018-19; With: Jörg Bergmeister & Patrick Lindsey | Succeeded by Emmanuel Collard; François Perrodo; Nicklas Nielsen |
