= 2012 European Le Mans Series =

Seasons
- ← 2011 2013 →

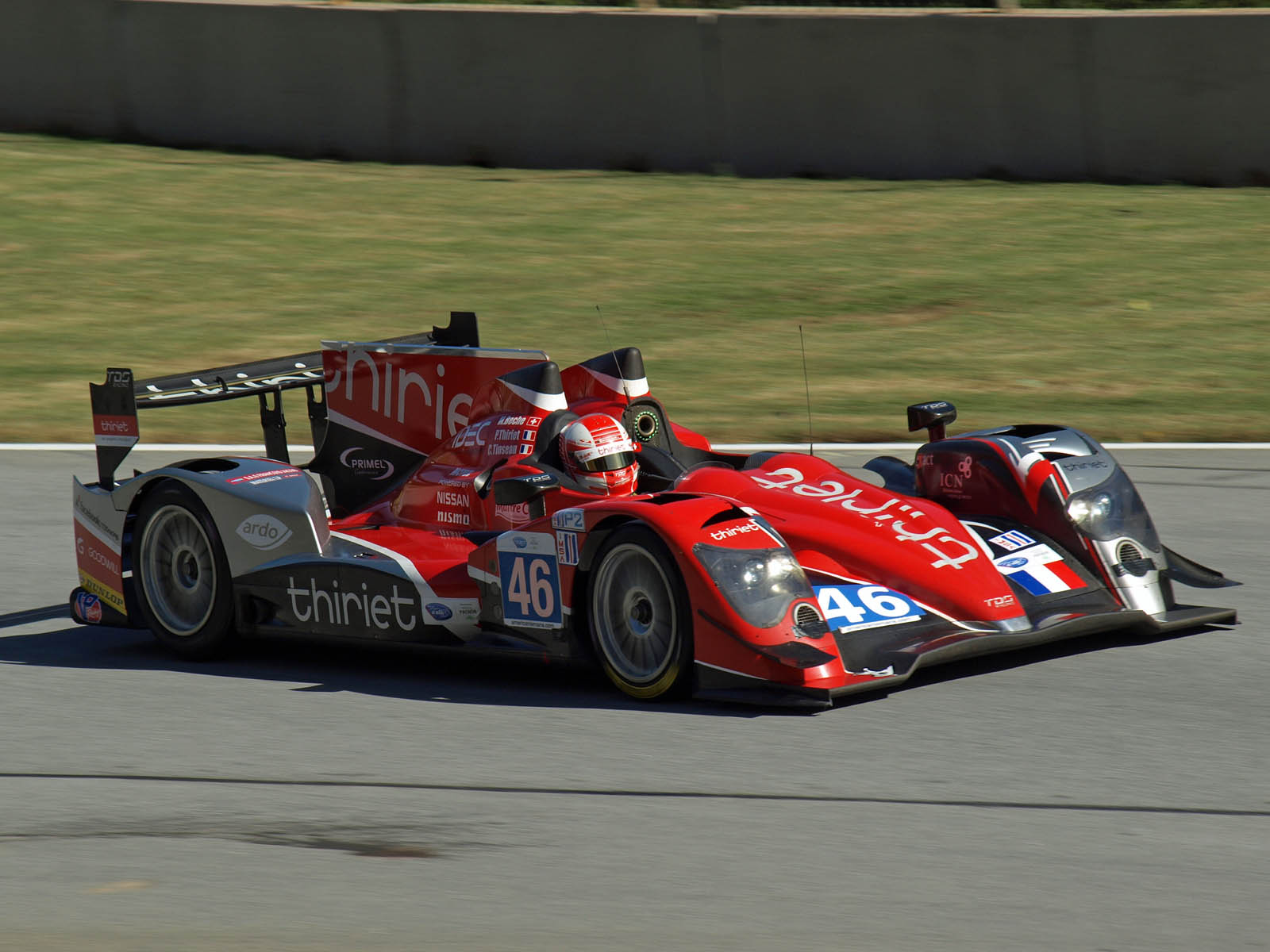
Thiriet by TDS Racing No. 46 Oreca 03, winner of the 2012 European Le Mans Series in the LMP2 class

The 2012 European Le Mans Series was the ninth season of the Automobile Club de l'Ouest's European Le Mans Series (previously known as simply Le Mans Series). Championship titles were awarded in five categories, with the Le Mans Series shifting its categories following its separation from the FIA World Endurance Championship. LMP1 cars were dropped due to most teams entering the FIA World Endurance Championship while a new GTC category was created to allow single make grand tourer cars and FIA GT3s to compete in endurance races. However, there were no GTC cars that competed during the season.

Due to the numerous issues the season was reduced to just three rounds, starting in Le Castellet, France on 1 April and ended at Braselton, Georgia, United States, on 20 October.

== Schedule ==
Following the ELMS decision to no longer share races with the FIA World Endurance Championship (formerly the Intercontinental Le Mans Cup), the series required new races to replace the Spa-Francorchamps and Silverstone races which now were part of the WEC. Circuit Paul Ricard was the only event carried over from 2011 and remained the season opener. Circuit Zolder was supposed to serve as the second round of the series, but on 1 April the race was cancelled due to a lack of entrants. ELMS teams were instead invited to enter the 6 Hours of Spa WEC round. Following a small number of entries at Donington, the season's two later rounds at the Brno Circuit and Autódromo Internacional do Algarve were cancelled. In place of these two rounds, an agreement was reached with the American Le Mans Series to allow ELMS competitors to participate in the Petit Le Mans for double points, with the ELMS providing transport assistance to full-season teams.

Rnd	Race	Circuit	Date
–	Official Test Session	Circuit Paul Ricard, Le Castellet, France	9–10 March
1	6 Hours of Castellet	Circuit Paul Ricard, Le Castellet, France	1 April
2	6 Hours of Donington	Donington Park, Castle Donington, United Kingdom	15 July
3	Petit Le Mans	(United States) Road Atlanta, Braselton, Georgia	20 October

== Regulation changes ==
The Le Mans Series made changes to its class structure for the 2012 season, eliminating one previous class while adding another. The LMP1 Le Mans Prototype category were no longer featured in LMS races due to the large amount of LMP1 factory teams which switched from the Le Mans Series to the World Endurance Championship. This move promotes the LMP2 category to the top of the class structure. To replace LMP1, a new class has been created at the bottom of the class structure, named GTC. This class allowed only three cars from various one make series to compete: The Ferrari 458 Challenge, Porsche 911 GT3 Cup, and the Lotus Evora GT4. Teams in GTC were not allowed more than one professional driver in their line-up. Finally, the Formula Le Mans category was renamed LMP Challenge, aligning with the title utilized by the American Le Mans Series.

== Entry list ==
Entry List
Entrant/Team	Car	Engine	Tyre	No	Drivers	Rounds
LMP2
(United Kingdom) Greaves Motorsport	Zytek Z11SN	Nissan VK45DE 4.5 L V8	D	1	(United Kingdom) Alex Brundle	All
(United Kingdom) Greaves Motorsport	Zytek Z11SN	Nissan VK45DE 4.5 L V8	D	1	(United Kingdom) Tom Kimber-Smith	All
(United Kingdom) Greaves Motorsport	Zytek Z11SN	Nissan VK45DE 4.5 L V8	D	1	(Spain) Lucas Ordóñez	1–2
(United Kingdom) Greaves Motorsport	Zytek Z11SN	Nissan VK45DE 4.5 L V8	D	1	(United Kingdom) Alex Buncombe	3
(Argentina) Pecom Racing	Oreca 03	Nissan VK45DE 4.5 L V8	D	10	(Argentina) Luís Pérez Companc	1–2
(Argentina) Pecom Racing	Oreca 03	Nissan VK45DE 4.5 L V8	D	10	(Germany) Pierre Kaffer	1–2
(Argentina) Pecom Racing	Oreca 03	Nissan VK45DE 4.5 L V8	D	10	(Italy) Gianmaria Bruni	1
(Argentina) Pecom Racing	Oreca 03	Nissan VK45DE 4.5 L V8	D	10	(France) Soheil Ayari	2
(Switzerland) Race Performance	Oreca 03	Judd-BMW HK 3.6 L V8	D	11	(Switzerland) Jonathan Hirschi	1
(Switzerland) Race Performance	Oreca 03	Judd-BMW HK 3.6 L V8	D	11	(Switzerland) Michel Frey	1
(Switzerland) Race Performance	Oreca 03	Judd-BMW HK 3.6 L V8	D	11	(Switzerland) Ralph Meichtry	1
(Republic of Ireland) Status GP	Lola B12/80	Judd-BMW HK 3.6 L V8	D	17	(United Kingdom) Alexander Sims	1–2
(Republic of Ireland) Status GP	Lola B12/80	Judd-BMW HK 3.6 L V8	D	17	(Netherlands) Yelmer Buurman	1
(Republic of Ireland) Status GP	Lola B12/80	Judd-BMW HK 3.6 L V8	D	17	(United Kingdom) Dean Stirling	1
(Republic of Ireland) Status GP	Lola B12/80	Judd-BMW HK 3.6 L V8	D	17	(France) Julien Jousse	2
(Republic of Ireland) Status GP	Lola B12/80	Judd-BMW HK 3.6 L V8	D	17	(France) Maxime Jousse	2
(Republic of Ireland) Murphy Prototypes	MG-Oreca 03	Nissan VK45DE 4.5 L V8	D	18	(United Kingdom) Jody Firth	All
(Republic of Ireland) Murphy Prototypes	MG-Oreca 03	Nissan VK45DE 4.5 L V8	D	18	(United Kingdom) Warren Hughes	All
(Republic of Ireland) Murphy Prototypes	MG-Oreca 03	Nissan VK45DE 4.5 L V8	D	18	(Italy) Luca Moro	1
(Republic of Ireland) Murphy Prototypes	MG-Oreca 03	Nissan VK45DE 4.5 L V8	D	18	(New Zealand) Brendon Hartley	2–3
(France) Sébastien Loeb Racing	Oreca 03	Nissan VK45DE 4.5 L V8	D	19	(France) Nicolas Marroc	1–2
(France) Sébastien Loeb Racing	Oreca 03	Nissan VK45DE 4.5 L V8	D	19	(France) Nicolas Minassian	1–2
(France) Sébastien Loeb Racing	Oreca 03	Nissan VK45DE 4.5 L V8	D	19	(France) Stéphane Sarrazin	1–2
(France) OAK Racing	Morgan LMP2	Judd-BMW HK 3.6 L V8	D	24	(France) Jacques Nicolet	1–2
(France) OAK Racing	Morgan LMP2	Judd-BMW HK 3.6 L V8	D	24	(France) Guillaume Moreau	1
(France) OAK Racing	Morgan LMP2	Judd-BMW HK 3.6 L V8	D	24	(Austria) Dominik Kraihamer	1
(France) OAK Racing	Morgan LMP2	Judd-BMW HK 3.6 L V8	D	24	(France) Matthieu Lahaye	2
(France) OAK Racing	Morgan LMP2	Nissan VK45DE 4.5 L V8	D	35	(Belgium) Bertrand Baguette	2–3
(France) OAK Racing	Morgan LMP2	Nissan VK45DE 4.5 L V8	D	35	(France) Dimitri Enjalbert	2
(France) OAK Racing	Morgan LMP2	Nissan VK45DE 4.5 L V8	D	35	(France) Olivier Pla	2–3
(France) OAK Racing	Morgan LMP2	Nissan VK45DE 4.5 L V8	D	35	(France) Jacques Nicolet	3
(United Kingdom) Jota	Zytek Z11SN	Nissan VK45DE 4.5 L V8	D	38	(United Kingdom) Sam Hancock	1–2
(United Kingdom) Jota	Zytek Z11SN	Nissan VK45DE 4.5 L V8	D	38	(United Kingdom) Simon Dolan	1–2
(France) Extrême Limite ARIC	Norma M200P	Judd-BMW HK 3.6 L V8	D	44	(France) Fabien Rosier	1
(France) Extrême Limite ARIC	Norma M200P	Judd-BMW HK 3.6 L V8	D	44	(France) Philippe Thirion	1
(Belgium) Boutsen Ginion Racing	Oreca 03	Nissan VK45DE 4.5 L V8	D	45	(France) Bastien Brière	1
(Belgium) Boutsen Ginion Racing	Oreca 03	Nissan VK45DE 4.5 L V8	D	45	(United Kingdom) Jack Clarke	1
(Belgium) Boutsen Ginion Racing	Oreca 03	Nissan VK45DE 4.5 L V8	D	45	(Switzerland) Sébastien Buemi	1
(France) Thiriet by TDS Racing	Oreca 03	Nissan VK45DE 4.5 L V8	D	46	(Switzerland) Mathias Beche	All
(France) Thiriet by TDS Racing	Oreca 03	Nissan VK45DE 4.5 L V8	D	46	(France) Pierre Thiriet	All
(France) Thiriet by TDS Racing	Oreca 03	Nissan VK45DE 4.5 L V8	D	46	(France) Christophe Tinseau	3
LMPC
(Belgium) Boutsen Ginion Racing	Oreca FLM09	Chevrolet LS3 6.2 L V8	M	40	(France) Thomas Dagoneau	1–2
(Belgium) Boutsen Ginion Racing	Oreca FLM09	Chevrolet LS3 6.2 L V8	M	40	(Italy) Massimo Vignali	1
(Belgium) Boutsen Ginion Racing	Oreca FLM09	Chevrolet LS3 6.2 L V8	M	40	(France) Jean-Marc Merlin	1
(Belgium) Boutsen Ginion Racing	Oreca FLM09	Chevrolet LS3 6.2 L V8	M	40	(France) Jean-Charles Battut	2
(Belgium) Boutsen Ginion Racing	Oreca FLM09	Chevrolet LS3 6.2 L V8	M	40	(United Kingdom) John Hartshorne	2
(United Kingdom) CURTIS Racing Technologies	Oreca FLM09	Chevrolet LS3 6.2 L V8	M	42	(United Kingdom) Phil Keen	1
(United Kingdom) CURTIS Racing Technologies	Oreca FLM09	Chevrolet LS3 6.2 L V8	M	42	(United Kingdom) John Hartshorne	1
(United Kingdom) CURTIS Racing Technologies	Oreca FLM09	Chevrolet LS3 6.2 L V8	M	42	(United Kingdom) Alex Kapadia	1
LM GTE Pro
(Switzerland) Kessel Racing	Ferrari 458 Italia GT2	Ferrari F136 4.5 L V8	D	61	(Poland) Michał Broniszewski	1
(Switzerland) Kessel Racing	Ferrari 458 Italia GT2	Ferrari F136 4.5 L V8	D	61	(Austria) Philipp Peter	1
(United Kingdom) JMW Motorsport	Ferrari 458 Italia GT2	Ferrari F136 4.5 L V8	D	66	(United Kingdom) James Walker	1
(United Kingdom) JMW Motorsport	Ferrari 458 Italia GT2	Ferrari F136 4.5 L V8	D	66	(United Kingdom) Jonny Cocker	1–2
(United Kingdom) JMW Motorsport	Ferrari 458 Italia GT2	Ferrari F136 4.5 L V8	D	66	(Denmark) Allan Simonsen	2
(Monaco) JMB Racing	Ferrari 458 Italia GT2	Ferrari F136 4.5 L V8	M	83	(Brazil) Jaime Melo	1
(Monaco) JMB Racing	Ferrari 458 Italia GT2	Ferrari F136 4.5 L V8	M	83	(Italy) Marco Frezza	1
LM GTE Am
(Italy) AF Corse	Ferrari 458 Italia GT2	Ferrari F136 4.5 L V8	M	60	(Italy) Piergiuseppe Perazzini	All
(Italy) AF Corse	Ferrari 458 Italia GT2	Ferrari F136 4.5 L V8	M	60	(Italy) Marco Cioci	All
(Italy) AF Corse	Ferrari 458 Italia GT2	Ferrari F136 4.5 L V8	M	60	(Republic of Ireland) Matt Griffin	All
(France) IMSA Performance Matmut	Porsche 997 GT3-RSR	Porsche M97/74 4.0 L Flat-6	M	67	(France) Anthony Pons	All
(France) IMSA Performance Matmut	Porsche 997 GT3-RSR	Porsche M97/74 4.0 L Flat-6	M	67	(France) Nicolas Armindo	All
(France) IMSA Performance Matmut	Porsche 997 GT3-RSR	Porsche M97/74 4.0 L Flat-6	M	67	(France) Raymond Narac	All
(United Kingdom) Gulf Racing	Aston Martin Vantage GTE	Aston Martin AM05 4.5 L V8	D	69	(United Kingdom) Stuart Hall	1
(United Kingdom) Gulf Racing	Aston Martin Vantage GTE	Aston Martin AM05 4.5 L V8	D	69	(Germany) Roald Goethe	1
(Belgium) Prospeed Competition	Porsche 997 GT3-RSR	Porsche M97/74 4.0 L Flat-6	M	75	(Belgium) Marc Goossens	1
(Belgium) Prospeed Competition	Porsche 997 GT3-RSR	Porsche M97/74 4.0 L Flat-6	M	75	(Belgium) Maxime Soulet	1
(Monaco) JMB Racing	Ferrari 458 Italia GT2	Ferrari F136 4.5 L V8	M	99	(France) Alain Ferté	1
(Monaco) JMB Racing	Ferrari 458 Italia GT2	Ferrari F136 4.5 L V8	M	99	(France) Philippe Illiano	1

== Season results ==
Rnd.	Circuit	LMP2 Winning Team	LMPC Winning Team	GTE Pro Winning Team	GTE Am Winning Team	Results
Rnd.	Circuit	LMP2 Winning Drivers	LMPC Winning Drivers	GTE Pro Winning Drivers	GTE Am Winning Drivers	Results
1	Paul Ricard	(France) No. 46 Thiriet by TDS Racing	(United Kingdom) No. 42 CURTIS Racing Technologies	(United Kingdom) No. 66 JMW Motorsport	(Belgium) No. 75 Prospeed Competition	Results
1	Paul Ricard	(Switzerland) Mathias Beche (France) Pierre Thiriet	(United Kingdom) John Hartshorne (United Kingdom) Alex Kapadia (United Kingdom) Phil Keen	(United Kingdom) James Walker (United Kingdom) Jonny Cocker	(Belgium) Marc Goossens (Belgium) Maxime Soulet	Results
2	Donington	(France) No. 35 OAK Racing	(Belgium) No. 40 Boutsen Ginion Racing	(United Kingdom) No. 66 JMW Motorsport	(France) No. 67 IMSA Performance Matmut	Results
2	Donington	(France) Olivier Pla (France) Dimitri Enjalbert (Belgium) Bertrand Baguette	(France) Thomas Dagoneau (France) Jean-Charles Battut (United Kingdom) John Hartshorne	(United Kingdom) Jonny Cocker (Denmark) Allan Simonsen	(France) Nicolas Armindo (France) Raymond Narac (France) Anthony Pons	Results
3	Road Atlanta	(France) No. 46 Thiriet by TDS Racing	Did Not Participate	Did Not Participate	(France) No. 67 IMSA Performance Matmut	Results
3	Road Atlanta	(Switzerland) Mathias Beche (France) Pierre Thiriet (France) Christophe Tinseau	Did Not Participate	Did Not Participate	(France) Nicolas Armindo (France) Raymond Narac (France) Anthony Pons	Results

== Championship Standings ==
Points are awarded to cars that finish in tenth place or higher, with unclassified entries failing to complete 70% of the race distance or entries failing to reach the finish not earning championship points. One bonus point is awarded for winning pole position (denoted by bold). Double points will be awarded at Petit Le Mans.

Points System
Position										Pole Position
1st	2nd	3rd	4th	5th	6th	7th	8th	9th	10th	Pole Position
25	18	15	12	10	8	6	4	2	1	1

== Teams Championships ==
The top two finishers in the LMP2, GTE Pro, and GTE Am championships earned automatic entry to the 2013 24 Hours of Le Mans.

=== LMP2 Standings ===
Pos	Team	Chassis	Engine	LEC (France)	DON (United Kingdom)	ATL (United States)	Total
1	(France) Thiriet by TDS Racing	Oreca 03	Nissan VK45DE 4.5 L V8	1	2	3	94
2	(France) OAK Racing	Morgan LMP2	Judd-BMW HK 3.6 L V8; Nissan VK45DE 4.5 L V8	6	1	4	71
3	(United Kingdom) Greaves Motorsport	Zytek Z11SN	Nissan VK45DE 4.5 L V8	4	7	5	48
4	(France) Sébastien Loeb Racing	Oreca 03	Nissan VK45DE 4.5 L V8	2	4		30
5	(Argentina) Pecom Racing	Oreca 03	Nissan VK45DE 4.5 L V8	7	5		16
6	(Republic of Ireland) Status GP	Lola B12/80	Nissan VK45DE 4.5 L V8	3	Ret		15
7	(Republic of Ireland) Murphy Prototypes	MG-Oreca 03	Judd-BMW HK 3.6 L V8	Ret	3	Ret	15
8	(Switzerland) Race Performance	Oreca 03	Judd-BMW HK 3.6 L V8	5			10
9	(France) Extrême Limite ARIC	Norma M200P	Judd-BMW HK 3.6 L V8	8			4
10	(United Kingdom) JOTA	Zytek Z11SN	Nissan VK45DE 4.5 L V8	9	Ret		2
–	(Belgium) Boutsen Ginion Racing	Oreca 03	Judd-BMW HK 3.6 L V8	Ret			0

=== LMPC Standings ===
Pos	Team	Chassis	Engine	LEC (France)	DON (United Kingdom)	ATL (United States)	Total
1	(Belgium) Boutsen Ginion Racing	Oreca FLM09	Chevrolet LS3 6.2 L V8	Ret	1		27
2	(United Kingdom) Curtis Racing Technologies	Oreca FLM09	Chevrolet LS3 6.2 L V8	1			25

=== LM GTE Pro Standings ===
Pos	Team	Chassis	Engine	LEC (France)	DON (United Kingdom)	ATL (United States)	Total
1	(United Kingdom) JMW Motorsport	Ferrari 458 Italia GT2	Ferrari F136 4.5 L V8	1	1		51
2	(Monaco) JMB Racing	Ferrari 458 Italia GT2	Ferrari F136 4.5 L V8	2			19

=== LM GTE Am Standings ===
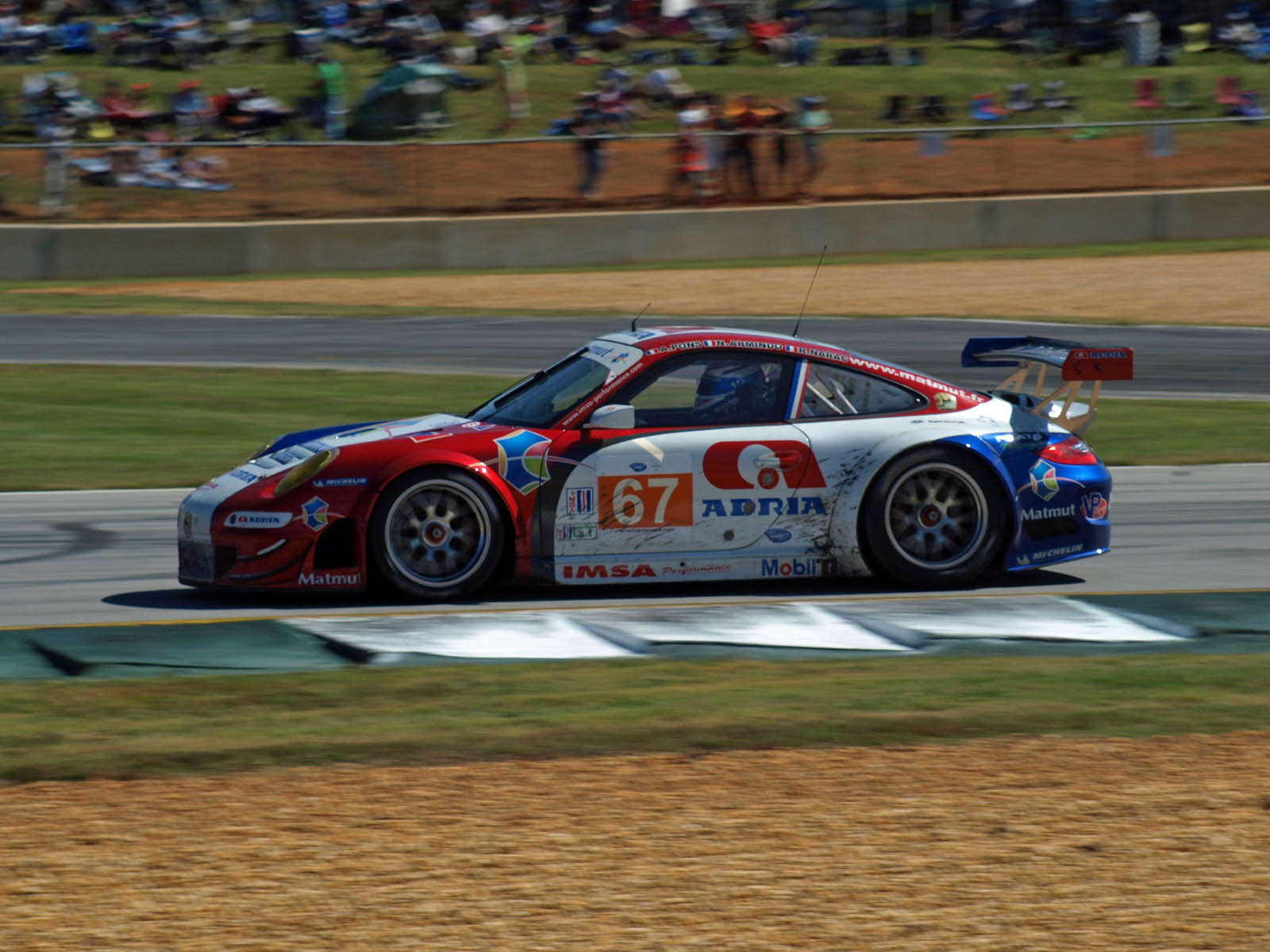
IMSA Performance took honors in the GTE Am class

Pos	Team	Chassis	Engine	LEC (France)	DON (United Kingdom)	ATL (United States)	Total
1	(France) IMSA Performance Matmut	Porsche 997 GT3-RSR	Porsche M97/74 4.0 L Flat-6	2	1	1	94
2	(Italy) AF Corse	Ferrari 458 Italia GT2	Ferrari F136 4.5 L V8	3	2	Ret	34
3	(Belgium) Prospeed Competition	Porsche 997 GT3-RSR	Porsche M97/74 4.0 L Flat-6	1			26

== Drivers Championships ==
=== LMP2 Standings ===
Pos	Driver	Team	LEC (France)	DON (United Kingdom)	ATL (United States)	Total
1	(France) Pierre Thiriet	(France) Thiriet by TDS Racing	1	2	3	94
1	(Switzerland) Mathias Beche	(France) Thiriet by TDS Racing	1	2	3	94
2	(Belgium) Bertrand Baguette	(France) OAK Racing		1	4	62
2	(France) Olivier Pla	(France) OAK Racing		1	4	62
3	(France) Jacques Nicolet	(France) OAK Racing	6	6	4	54
4	(France) Christophe Tinseau	(France) Thiriet by TDS Racing			3	50
5	(United Kingdom) Alex Brundle	(United Kingdom) Greaves Motorsport	4	7	5	48
5	(United Kingdom) Tom Kimber-Smith	(United Kingdom) Greaves Motorsport	4	7	5	48
6	(France) Nicolas Marroc	(France) Sébastien Loeb Racing	2	4		30
6	(France) Stéphane Sarrazin	(France) Sébastien Loeb Racing	2	4		30
6	(France) Nicolas Minassian	(France) Sébastien Loeb Racing	2	4		30
7	(France) Dimitri Enjalbert	(France) OAK Racing		1		25
8	(Spain) Lucas Ordoñez	(United Kingdom) Greaves Motorsport	4	7		18
9	(Argentina) Luís Pérez Companc	(Argentina) Pecom Racing	7	5		16
9	(Germany) Pierre Kaffer	(Argentina) Pecom Racing	7	5		16
10	(United Kingdom) Alexander Sims	(Republic of Ireland) Status GP	3	Ret		15
10	(United Kingdom) Dean Sterling	(Republic of Ireland) Status GP	3			15
10	(Netherlands) Yelmer Buurman	(Republic of Ireland) Status GP	3			15
10	(United Kingdom) Jody Firth	(Republic of Ireland) Murphy Prototypes	Ret	3	Ret	15
10	(United Kingdom) Warren Hughes	(Republic of Ireland) Murphy Prototypes	Ret	3	Ret	15
10	(New Zealand) Brendon Hartley	(Republic of Ireland) Murphy Prototypes		3	Ret	15
11	(Switzerland) Michel Frey	(Switzerland) Race Performance	5			10
11	(Switzerland) Jonathan Hirschi	(Switzerland) Race Performance	5			10
11	(Switzerland) Ralph Meichtry	(Switzerland) Race Performance	5			10
11	(France) Soheil Ayari	(Argentina) Pecom Racing		5		10
12	(France) Matthieu Lahaye	(France) OAK Racing		6		9
13	(France) Guillaume Moreau	(France) OAK Racing	6			8
13	(Austria) Dominik Kraihamer	(France) OAK Racing	6			8
14	(Italy) Gianmaria Bruni	(Argentina) Pecom Racing	7			6
15	(France) Fabien Rosier	(France) Extrême Limite ARIC	8			4
15	(France) Philippe Thirion	(France) Extrême Limite ARIC	8			4
16	(United Kingdom) Sam Hancock	(United Kingdom) JOTA	9	Ret		2
16	(United Kingdom) Simon Dolan	(United Kingdom) JOTA	9	Ret		2

=== LMPC Standings ===
Pos	Driver	Team	LEC (France)	DON (United Kingdom)	ATL (United States)	Total
1	(United Kingdom) John Hartshorne	(United Kingdom) Curtis Racing Technologies (Belgium) Boutsen Ginion Racing	1	1		51
2	(France) Thomas Dagoneau	(Belgium) Boutsen Ginion Racing	Ret	1		27
3	(France) Jean-Charles Battut	(Belgium) Boutsen Ginion Racing		1		26
4	(United Kingdom) Alex Kapadia	(United Kingdom) Curtis Racing Technologies	1			25
4	(United Kingdom) Phil Keen	(United Kingdom) Curtis Racing Technologies	1			25
5	(France) Jean-Marc Merlin	(Belgium) Boutsen Ginion Racing	Ret			1
5	(Italy) Massimo Vignali	(Belgium) Boutsen Ginion Racing	Ret			1

=== LM GTE Pro Standings ===
Pos	Driver	Team	LEC (France)	DON (United Kingdom)	ATL (United States)	Total
1	(United Kingdom) Jonny Cocker	(United Kingdom) JMW Motorsport	1	1		51
2	(United Kingdom) James Walker	(United Kingdom) JMW Motorsport	1	WD		26
3	(Denmark) Allan Simonsen	(United Kingdom) JMW Motorsport		1		25
4	(Brazil) Jaime Melo	(Monaco) JMB Racing	2			19
4	(Italy) Marco Frezza	(Monaco) JMB Racing	2			19

=== LM GTE Am Standings ===
Pos	Driver	Team	LEC (France)	DON (United Kingdom)	ATL (United States)	Total
1	(France) Anthony Pons	(France) IMSA Performance Matmut	2	1	1	94
1	(France) Nicolas Armindo	(France) IMSA Performance Matmut	2	1	1	94
1	(France) Raymond Narac	(France) IMSA Performance Matmut	2	1	1	94
2	(Italy) Piergiuseppe Perazzini	(Italy) AF Corse	3	2	Ret	34
2	(Italy) Marco Cioci	(Italy) AF Corse	3	2	Ret	34
2	(Republic of Ireland) Matt Griffin	(Italy) AF Corse	3	2	Ret	34
3	(Belgium) Marc Goossens	(Belgium) Prospeed Competition	1			26
3	(Belgium) Maxime Soulet	(Belgium) Prospeed Competition	1			26

== Manufacturers Cups ==
=== LMP2 Standings ===
Pos	Constructor	LEC (France)	DON (United Kingdom)	ATL (United States)	Total
1	Oreca-Nissan	44	33	50	127
2	Morgan-Nissan		25	37	62
3	Zytek-Nissan	14	6	30	50
4	Morgan-Judd	8	9		17
5	Lola-Judd	15	0		15
6	Oreca-Judd	10			10
7	Norma-Judd	4			4

=== LM GTE Standings ===
Pos	Constructor	LEC (France)	DON (United Kingdom)	ATL (United States)	Total
1	Porsche	27	18	51	96
2	Ferrari	44	41	0	85
–	Aston Martin	0			0
