= 2012 6 Hours of Donington =

Layout of the Donington Park

The 2012 6 Hours of Donington was an auto race held at the Donington Park Circuit, Leicestershire, United Kingdom on 13–15 July 2012. It was the second round of the 2012 European Le Mans Series season, and the first time that the European Le Mans Series held the 6 Hours of Donington since 2006. The race was won by Olivier Pla, Dimitri Enjalbert, and Bertrand Baguette driving for OAK Racing in a Morgan-Nissan.

== Qualifying ==
=== Qualifying result ===
Pole position in each class are marked in bold.

Pos	Class	Team	Driver	Lap Time	Grid
1	**LMP2**	**No. 24 OAK Racing**	**Matthieu Lahaye**	**1:20.921**	1
2	LMP2	No. 46 Thiriet by TDS Racing	Mathias Beche	1:21.063	2
3	LMP2	No. 38 Jota	Sam Hancock	1:21.192	3
4	LMP2	No. 35 OAK Racing	Olivier Pla	1:21.226	4
5	LMP2	No. 1 Greaves Motorsport	Tom Kimber-Smith	1:21.238	5
6	LMP2	No. 17 Status GP	Alexander Sims	1:21.293	6
7	LMP2	No. 19 Sébastien Loeb Racing	Stéphane Sarrazin	1:21.539	7
8	LMP2	No. 18 Murphy Prototypes	Jody Firth	1:21.971	8
9	LMP2	No. 10 Pecom Racing	Soheil Ayari	1:22.879	9
10	**LMPC**	**No. 40 Boutsen Ginion Racing**	**Thomas Dagoneau**	**1:28.737**	10
11	**LMGTE Pro**	**No. 66 JMW Racing**	**Jonny Cocker**	**1:29.328**	13
12	**LMGTE Am**	**No. 60 AF Corse**	**Marco Cioci**	**1:29.733**	11
13	LMGTE Am	No. 67 IMSA Performance Matmut	Nicolas Armindo	1:30.183	12

Note: The No. 66 JMW Ferrari was moved to the back of the starting grid for substituting a driver after the qualifying session.

== Race ==
=== Race result ===
Class winners in bold. Cars failing to complete 70% of winner's distance marked as Not Classified (NC).

Pos	Class	No	Team	Drivers	Chassis	Tyre	Laps
Pos	Class	No	Team	Drivers	Engine	Tyre	Laps
1	**LMP2**	**35**	**(France) OAK Racing**	**(France) Olivier Pla (France) Dimitri Enjalbert (Belgium) Bertrand Baguette**	**Morgan LMP2**	D	**251**
1	**LMP2**	**35**	**(France) OAK Racing**	**(France) Olivier Pla (France) Dimitri Enjalbert (Belgium) Bertrand Baguette**	**Nissan VK45DE 4.5 L V8**	D	**251**
2	LMP2	46	(France) Thiriet by TDS Racing	(France) Pierre Thiriet (Switzerland) Mathias Beche	Oreca 03	D	251
2	LMP2	46	(France) Thiriet by TDS Racing	(France) Pierre Thiriet (Switzerland) Mathias Beche	Nissan VK45DE 4.5 L V8	D	251
3	LMP2	18	(Republic of Ireland) Murphy Prototypes	(United Kingdom) Warren Hughes (United Kingdom) Jody Firth (New Zealand) Brendon Hartley	MG-Oreca 03	D	251
3	LMP2	18	(Republic of Ireland) Murphy Prototypes	(United Kingdom) Warren Hughes (United Kingdom) Jody Firth (New Zealand) Brendon Hartley	Nissan VK45DE 4.5 L V8	D	251
4	LMP2	19	(France) Sébastien Loeb Racing	(France) Nicolas Marroc (France) Stéphane Sarrazin (France) Nicolas Minassian	Oreca 03	D	250
4	LMP2	19	(France) Sébastien Loeb Racing	(France) Nicolas Marroc (France) Stéphane Sarrazin (France) Nicolas Minassian	Nissan VK45DE 4.5 L V8	D	250
5	LMP2	10	(Argentina) Pecom Racing	(Argentina) Luís Pérez Companc (Germany) Pierre Kaffer (France) Soheil Ayari	Oreca 03	D	246
5	LMP2	10	(Argentina) Pecom Racing	(Argentina) Luís Pérez Companc (Germany) Pierre Kaffer (France) Soheil Ayari	Nissan VK45DE 4.5 L V8	D	246
6	LMP2	24	(France) OAK Racing	(France) Matthieu Lahaye (France) Jacques Nicolet	Morgan LMP2	D	244
6	LMP2	24	(France) OAK Racing	(France) Matthieu Lahaye (France) Jacques Nicolet	Judd HK 3.6 L V8	D	244
7	LMP2	1	(United Kingdom) Greaves Motorsport	(United Kingdom) Alex Brundle (United Kingdom) Tom Kimber-Smith (Spain) Lucas Ordoñez	Zytek Z11SN	D	234
7	LMP2	1	(United Kingdom) Greaves Motorsport	(United Kingdom) Alex Brundle (United Kingdom) Tom Kimber-Smith (Spain) Lucas Ordoñez	Nissan VK45DE 4.5 L V8	D	234
8	**LMGTE; Pro**	**66**	**(United Kingdom) JMW Motorsport**	**(United Kingdom) Jonny Cocker (Denmark) Allan Simonsen**	**Ferrari 458 Italia GT2**	D	**232**
8	**LMGTE; Pro**	**66**	**(United Kingdom) JMW Motorsport**	**(United Kingdom) Jonny Cocker (Denmark) Allan Simonsen**	**Ferrari F136 4.5 L V8**	D	**232**
9	**LMGTE; Am**	**67**	**(France) IMSA Performance Matmut**	**(France) Anthony Pons (France) Nicolas Armindo (France) Raymond Narac**	**Porsche 997 GT3-RSR**	M	**231**
9	**LMGTE; Am**	**67**	**(France) IMSA Performance Matmut**	**(France) Anthony Pons (France) Nicolas Armindo (France) Raymond Narac**	**Porsche M97/74 4.0 L Flat-6**	M	**231**
10	LMGTE; Am	60	(Italy) AF Corse	(Italy) Piergiuseppe Perazzini (Italy) Marco Cioci (Republic of Ireland) Matt Griffin	Ferrari 458 Italia GT2	M	230
10	LMGTE; Am	60	(Italy) AF Corse	(Italy) Piergiuseppe Perazzini (Italy) Marco Cioci (Republic of Ireland) Matt Griffin	Ferrari F136 4.5 L V8	M	230
11	**LMPC**	**40**	**(Belgium) Boutsen Ginion Racing**	**(France) Thomas Dagoneau (France) Jean-Charles Battut (United Kingdom) John Hartshorne**	**Oreca FLM09**	M	**213**
11	**LMPC**	**40**	**(Belgium) Boutsen Ginion Racing**	**(France) Thomas Dagoneau (France) Jean-Charles Battut (United Kingdom) John Hartshorne**	**GM LS3 6.2 L V8**	M	**213**
12 DNF	LMP2	38	(United Kingdom) Jota	(United Kingdom) Sam Hancock (United Kingdom) Simon Dolan	Zytek Z11SN	D	127
12 DNF	LMP2	38	(United Kingdom) Jota	(United Kingdom) Sam Hancock (United Kingdom) Simon Dolan	Nissan VK45DE 4.5 L V8	D	127
13 DNF	LMP2	17	(Republic of Ireland) Status GP	(United Kingdom) Alexander Sims (France) Julien Jousse (France) Maxime Jousse	Lola B12/80	D	45
13 DNF	LMP2	17	(Republic of Ireland) Status GP	(United Kingdom) Alexander Sims (France) Julien Jousse (France) Maxime Jousse	Judd HK 3.6 L V8	D	45

European Le Mans Series
Previous race: 6 Hours of Castellet	2012 season	Next race: Petit Le Mans
