= 2012 6 Hours of Castellet =

Circuit Paul Ricard 1A-V2 (pit road was different before 2019

The 2012 6 Hours of Castellet (6 Heures du Castellet) was the opening round of the 2012 European Le Mans Series season. It took place at Circuit Paul Ricard on 1 April 2012. Previously known as the Le Mans Series, it was the first race in the series' history where LMP1 was not contested in as LMP2 has taken over as the top prototype class. The Formula Le Mans (FLM) spec class has been renamed to Le Mans Prototype Challenge (LMPC), the same name used in the American Le Mans Series. A new Grand Touring class was meant to participate in the opening round which was Grand Touring Challenge (GTC), but lack of entrants meant it did not participate.

== Qualifying result ==
Pole position winners in each class are marked in bold.

Pos	Class	Team	Driver	Lap Time	Grid
1	**LMP2**	**No.46 Thiriet by TDS Racing**	**Mathias Beche**	**1:48.171**	**1**
2	LMP2	No.17 Status GP	Yelmer Buurman	1:48.482	2
3	LMP2	No.1 Greaves Motorsport	Tom Kimber-Smith	1:48.882	3
4	LMP2	No.24 OAK Racing	Guillaume Moreau	1:48.977	4
5	LMP2	No.10 Pecom Racing	Pierre Kaffer	1:49.068	5
6	LMP2	No.18 Murphy Prototypes	Warren Hughes	1:49.122	6
7	LMP2	No.19 Sébastien Loeb Racing	Stéphane Sarrazin	1:49.157	7
8	LMP2	No.38 JOTA	Sam Hancock	1:49.687	8
9	LMP2	No.11 Race Performance	Michel Frey	1:50.193	9
10	**LMPC**	**No.40 Boutsen Ginion Racing**	**Massimo Vignali**	**1:55.338**	**10**
11	LMPC	No.42 CURTIS Racing Technologies	Phil Keen	1:55.410	11
12	**GTE-Pro**	**No.83 JMB Racing**	**Jaime Melo**	**1:57.630**	**12**
13	**GTE-Am**	**No.75 Prospeed Competition**	**Marc Goossens**	**1:58.388**	**13**
14	GTE-Am	No.67 IMSA Performance Matmut	Nicolas Armindo	1:58.428	14
15	GTE-Pro	No.66 JMW Motorsport	James Walker	1:58.517	15
16	GTE-Am	No.69 Gulf Racing	Stuart Hall	1:58.532	16
17	GTE-Am	No.60 AF Corse	Marco Cioci	1:58.803	17
18	GTE-Pro	No.61 Kessel Racing	Philipp Peter	1:59.082	18
19	GTE-Am	No.99 JMB Racing	Alain Ferté	2:00.182	19
20	LMP2	No.44 Extrême Limite ARIC	No Time		20
21	LMP2	No.45 Boutsen Ginion Racing	No Time		21

== Race ==
=== Race result ===
Class winners in bold. Cars failing to complete 70% of winner's distance marked as Not Classified (NC).

Pos	Class	No	Team	Drivers	Chassis	Tyre	Laps
Pos	Class	No	Team	Drivers	Engine	Tyre	Laps
1	**LMP2**	**46**	**(France) Thiriet by TDS Racing**	**(France) Pierre Thiriet (Switzerland) Mathias Beche**	**Oreca 03**	D	**189**
1	**LMP2**	**46**	**(France) Thiriet by TDS Racing**	**(France) Pierre Thiriet (Switzerland) Mathias Beche**	**Nissan VK45DE 4.5 L V8**	D	**189**
2	LMP2	19	(France) Sébastien Loeb Racing	(France) Nicolas Marroc (France) Stéphane Sarrazin (France) Nicolas Minassian	Oreca 03	D	188
2	LMP2	19	(France) Sébastien Loeb Racing	(France) Nicolas Marroc (France) Stéphane Sarrazin (France) Nicolas Minassian	Nissan VK45DE 4.5 L V8	D	188
3	LMP2	17	(Republic of Ireland) Status GP	(United Kingdom) Alexander Sims (United Kingdom) Dean Sterling (Netherlands) Yelmer Buurman	Lola B12/80	D	188
3	LMP2	17	(Republic of Ireland) Status GP	(United Kingdom) Alexander Sims (United Kingdom) Dean Sterling (Netherlands) Yelmer Buurman	Judd-BMW HK 3.6 L V8	D	188
4	LMP2	1	(United Kingdom) Greaves Motorsport	(United Kingdom) Alex Brundle (United Kingdom) Tom Kimber-Smith (Spain) Lucas Ordoñez	Zytek Z11SN	D	188
4	LMP2	1	(United Kingdom) Greaves Motorsport	(United Kingdom) Alex Brundle (United Kingdom) Tom Kimber-Smith (Spain) Lucas Ordoñez	Nissan VK45DE 4.5 L V8	D	188
5	LMP2	11	(Switzerland) Race Performance	(Switzerland) Michel Frey (Switzerland) Jonathan Hirschi (Switzerland) Ralph Meichtry	Oreca 03	D	186
5	LMP2	11	(Switzerland) Race Performance	(Switzerland) Michel Frey (Switzerland) Jonathan Hirschi (Switzerland) Ralph Meichtry	Judd-BMW HK 3.6 L V8	D	186
6	LMP2	24	(France) OAK Racing	(France) Jacques Nicolet (France) Guillaume Moreau (Austria) Dominik Kraihamer	Morgan LMP2	D	185
6	LMP2	24	(France) OAK Racing	(France) Jacques Nicolet (France) Guillaume Moreau (Austria) Dominik Kraihamer	Judd-BMW HK 3.6 L V8	D	185
7	LMP2	10	(Argentina) Pecom Racing	(Argentina) Luís Pérez Companc (Germany) Pierre Kaffer (Italy) Gianmaria Bruni	Oreca 03	D	183
7	LMP2	10	(Argentina) Pecom Racing	(Argentina) Luís Pérez Companc (Germany) Pierre Kaffer (Italy) Gianmaria Bruni	Nissan VK45DE 4.5 L V8	D	183
8	**LMPC**	**42**	**(United Kingdom) CURTIS Racing Technologies**	**(United Kingdom) Phil Keen (United Kingdom) John Hartshorne (United Kingdom) Alex Kapadia**	**Oreca FLM09**	MI	**177**
8	**LMPC**	**42**	**(United Kingdom) CURTIS Racing Technologies**	**(United Kingdom) Phil Keen (United Kingdom) John Hartshorne (United Kingdom) Alex Kapadia**	**Chevrolet LS3 6.2 L V8**	MI	**177**
9	**LMGTE; Pro**	**66**	**(United Kingdom) JMW Motorsport**	**(United Kingdom) Jonny Cocker (United Kingdom) James Walker**	**Ferrari 458 Italia GT2**	D	**176**
9	**LMGTE; Pro**	**66**	**(United Kingdom) JMW Motorsport**	**(United Kingdom) Jonny Cocker (United Kingdom) James Walker**	**Ferrari F136 4.5 L V8**	D	**176**
10	LMGTE; Pro	83	(Monaco) JMB Racing	(Brazil) Jaime Melo (Italy) Marco Frezza	Ferrari 458 Italia GT2	MI	176
10	LMGTE; Pro	83	(Monaco) JMB Racing	(Brazil) Jaime Melo (Italy) Marco Frezza	Ferrari F136 4.5 L V8	MI	176
11	**LMGTE; Am**	**75**	**(Belgium) Prospeed Competition**	**(Belgium) Marc Goossens (Belgium) Maxime Soulet**	**Porsche 997 GT3-RSR**	MI	**175**
11	**LMGTE; Am**	**75**	**(Belgium) Prospeed Competition**	**(Belgium) Marc Goossens (Belgium) Maxime Soulet**	**Porsche M97/74 4.0 L Flat-6**	MI	**175**
12	LMP2	44	(France) Extrême Limite ARIC	(France) Fabien Rosier (France) Philippe Thirion	Norma M200P	D	175
12	LMP2	44	(France) Extrême Limite ARIC	(France) Fabien Rosier (France) Philippe Thirion	Judd-BMW HK 3.6 L V8	D	175
13	LMP2	38	(United Kingdom) JOTA	(United Kingdom) Sam Hancock (United Kingdom) Simon Dolan	Zytek Z11SN	D	174
13	LMP2	38	(United Kingdom) JOTA	(United Kingdom) Sam Hancock (United Kingdom) Simon Dolan	Nissan VK45DE 4.5 L V8	D	174
14	LMGTE; Am	67	(France) IMSA Performance Matmut	(France) Anthony Pons (France) Nicolas Armindo (France) Raymond Narac	Porsche 997 GT3-RSR	MI	174
14	LMGTE; Am	67	(France) IMSA Performance Matmut	(France) Anthony Pons (France) Nicolas Armindo (France) Raymond Narac	Porsche M97/74 4.0 L Flat-6	MI	174
15	LMGTE; Pro	61	(Switzerland) Kessel Racing	(Poland) Michał Broniszewski (Austria) Philipp Peter	Ferrari 458 Italia GT2	D	174
15	LMGTE; Pro	61	(Switzerland) Kessel Racing	(Poland) Michał Broniszewski (Austria) Philipp Peter	Ferrari F136 4.5 L V8	D	174
16	LMGTE; Am	99	(Monaco) JMB Racing	(France) Alain Ferté (France) Philippe Illiano	Ferrari 458 Italia GT2	MI	172
16	LMGTE; Am	99	(Monaco) JMB Racing	(France) Alain Ferté (France) Philippe Illiano	Ferrari F136 4.5 L V8	MI	172
17	LMGTE; Am	69	(United Kingdom) Gulf Racing	(Germany) Roald Goethe (United Kingdom) Stuart Hall	Aston Martin Vantage GT2	D	160
17	LMGTE; Am	69	(United Kingdom) Gulf Racing	(Germany) Roald Goethe (United Kingdom) Stuart Hall	Aston Martin AJ37 4.5 L V8	D	160
18	LMGTE; Am	60	(Italy) AF Corse	(Italy) Piergiuseppe Perazzini (Italy) Marco Cioci (Republic of Ireland) Matt Griffin	Ferrari 458 Italia GT2	MI	144
18	LMGTE; Am	60	(Italy) AF Corse	(Italy) Piergiuseppe Perazzini (Italy) Marco Cioci (Republic of Ireland) Matt Griffin	Ferrari F136 4.5 L V8	MI	144
DNF	LMPC	40	(Belgium) Boutsen Ginion Racing	(France) Thomas Dagoneau (France) Jean-Marc Merlin (Italy) Massimo Vignali	Oreca FLM09	MI	111
DNF	LMPC	40	(Belgium) Boutsen Ginion Racing	(France) Thomas Dagoneau (France) Jean-Marc Merlin (Italy) Massimo Vignali	Chevrolet LS3 6.2 L V8	MI	111
DNF	LMP2	18	(Republic of Ireland) Murphy Prototypes	(United Kingdom) Warren Hughes (United Kingdom) Jody Firth (Italy) Luca Moro	MG-Oreca 03	D	64
DNF	LMP2	18	(Republic of Ireland) Murphy Prototypes	(United Kingdom) Warren Hughes (United Kingdom) Jody Firth (Italy) Luca Moro	Nissan VK45DE 4.5 L V8	D	64
DNF	LMP2	45	(Belgium) Boutsen Ginion Racing	(France) Bastien Brière (United Kingdom) Jack Clarke (Switzerland) Sébastien Buemi	Oreca 03	D	27
DNF	LMP2	45	(Belgium) Boutsen Ginion Racing	(France) Bastien Brière (United Kingdom) Jack Clarke (Switzerland) Sébastien Buemi	Nissan VK45DE 4.5 L V8	D	27

European Le Mans Series
Previous race: None	2012 season	Next race: 6 Hours of Donington
