= Murphy Prototypes =

Defunct Irish auto racing team

(Republic of Ireland) Murphy Prototypes
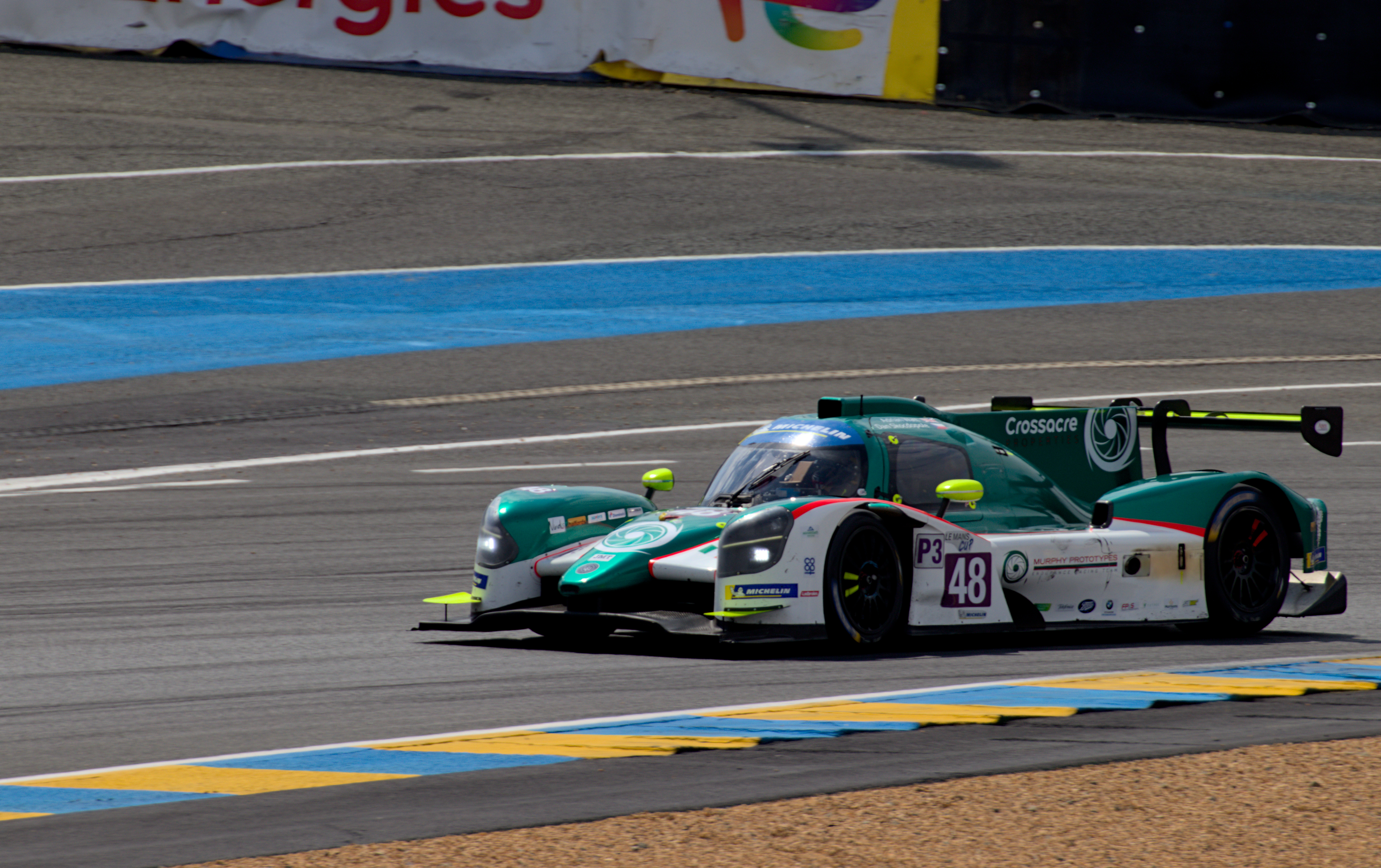
- Founded: 2012
- Folded: 2023
- Team principal(s): Greg Murphy
- Former series: European Le Mans Series, Le Mans Cup
- Noted drivers: (India) Karun Chandhok (Venezuela) Rodolfo González (France) Nathanaël Berthon (Brazil) Pipo Derani (New Zealand) Brendon Hartley

Murphy Prototypes was an Irish auto racing team founded by former single-seater racer Greg Murphy. Based in Dublin, the team was active in endurance racing from 2012 and competed in the European Le Mans Series, the 24 Hours of Le Mans, and more recently, the Michelin Le Mans Cup in the LMP2 and LMP3 classes.

As of 2023, the team has ceased operations and is no longer competing in any major racing series.

== History ==
The team was founded in January 2012 by Greg Murphy, a former Asian Formula Three Championship driver. Murphy Prototypes made their debut in the 2012 European Le Mans Series with an Oreca 03-Nissan in the LMP2 class. Their campaign started at Paul Ricard but ended early after 64 laps. They rebounded with a podium finish (third) at Donington. That same year, the team was invited to compete in the 2012 24 Hours of Le Mans, where they led the LMP2 class on several occasions before retiring due to a gearbox failure during the night.

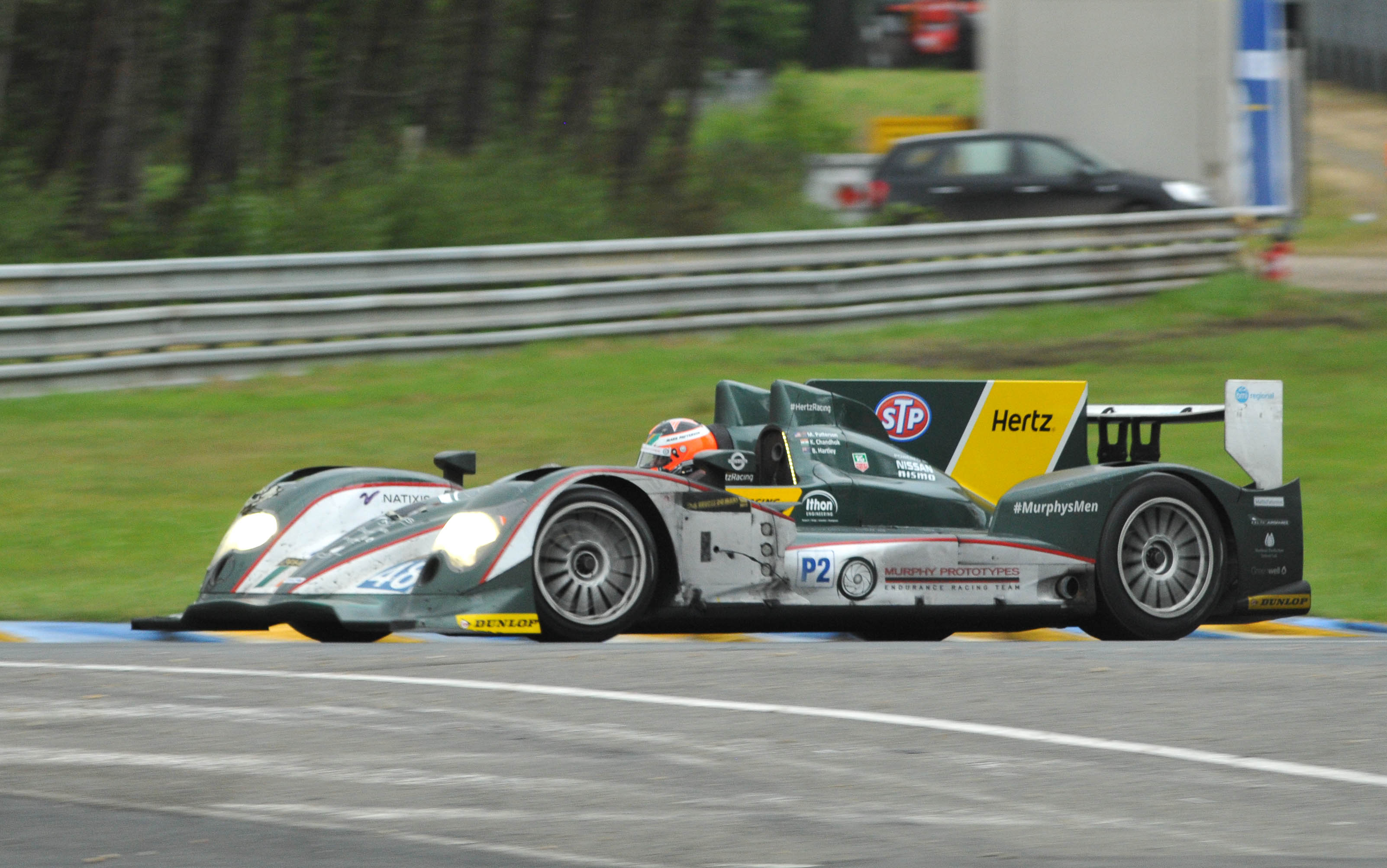
Murphy Prototypes Oreca 03-Nissan at the 2013 24 Hours of Le Mans.

In 2013, the team enjoyed its most successful season, finishing fourth overall in the ELMS and scoring its first series win at the final round in Paul Ricard. At the 2013 24 Hours of Le Mans, Murphy Prototypes finished 12th overall and sixth in the LMP2 class. The driver line-up included former Formula One driver Karun Chandhok.

The 2014 season saw the team drop to seventh in the ELMS standings with only one podium finish, and their Le Mans effort ended after just 73 laps due to a collision during heavy rain. The team continued to compete in both the ELMS and Le Mans through 2015 and 2016, but with diminishing results.

Murphy Prototypes transitioned to the LMP3 class and returned to the Michelin Le Mans Cup in 2023 with a Duqueine D-08. Greg Murphy appeared in a bullish social media video posted on the team's X (formerly Twitter) account on June 9, 2023 from the Circuit de la Sarthe, expressing strong ambitions for the team’s future at Le Mans. However, this would be the team's final public activity. The team has since disappeared from both the Le Mans Cup and ELMS entry lists.

Murphy’s ambitions to take his team to the top tier of endurance racing were once bold. In a 2014 interview with The Irish Times, he stated: "Our goal is to move up to LMP1 and win. It is of a similar level to Formula 1 so it's not the work of the moment."

== E-Scooter Championship and Decline ==
Following the apparent end of Murphy Prototypes' motorsport activities, team principal Greg Murphy shifted focus toward the emerging electric micromobility space, entering the short-lived ESkootr Championship under the banner Murphy Scooters. The team’s involvement was first teased via their X (formerly Twitter) account in March 2022 with a now-archived post promising "exciting news," followed the next day by the announcement of their participation in the new electric scooter series. The announcement was met with mixed reactions, with some long-time followers expressing disappointment that it wasn’t a return to LMP2 racing.

Activity on the Murphy Scooters Facebook page ceased after November 2022, and the team has not been mentioned in any official E-Skootr Championship communications since.

Around the same time, Murphy launched another micro-mobility company, Jule Mobility Limited, promoting electric transport solutions. However, the company’s listed website is no longer active and is currently up for sale, much like the main Murphy Prototypes domain.

== Racing record ==
=== 24 Hours of Le Mans results ===
Year	Entrant	No.	Car	Drivers	Class	Laps	Pos.	Class Pos.
2012	(Republic of Ireland) Murphy Prototypes	48	Oreca 03-Nissan	(United Kingdom) Jody Firth (New Zealand) Brendon Hartley (United Kingdom) Warren Hughes	LMP2	196	DNF	DNF
2013	(Republic of Ireland) Murphy Prototypes	48	Oreca 03-Nissan	(India) Karun Chandhok (New Zealand) Brendon Hartley (United States) Mark Patterson	LMP2	319	12th	6th
2014	(Republic of Ireland) Murphy Prototypes	48	Oreca 03R-Nissan	(France) Nathanaël Berthon (India) Karun Chandhok (Venezuela) Rodolfo González	LMP2	73	DNF	DNF
2015	(Republic of Ireland) Murphy Prototypes	48	Oreca 03R-Nissan	(France) Nathanaël Berthon (India) Karun Chandhok (United States) Mark Patterson	LMP2	347	13th	5th
2016	(Republic of Ireland) Murphy Prototypes	48	Oreca 03R-Nissan	(Netherlands) Jeroen Bleekemolen (Belgium) Marc Goossens (United States) Ben Keating	LMP2	323	34th	15th
