= Pierre Thiriet =

French racing driver

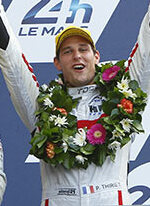
- Thiriet on the podium of the 2014 24 Hours of Le Mans
- Nationality: (France) French
- Born: 20 April 1989 (age 37) Épinal, France

European Le Mans Series career
- Debut season: 2011
- Current team: Thiriet by TDS Racing
- Categorisation: FIA Silver
- Car number: 46
- Starts: 8
- Wins: 4
- Poles: 0
- Fastest laps: 0
- Best finish: Champion in 2012

Previous series
- 2009–2010: Eurocup Mégane Trophy

Championship titles
- 2012: Euro Le Mans Series LMP2 Class

Pierre Louis Thiriet (born 20 April 1989 in Épinal) is a French racing driver. He finished eighth overall and second in the LMP2 class of the 2012 24 Hours of Le Mans and won the European Le Mans Series in the LMP2 class in 2012.

== Career ==
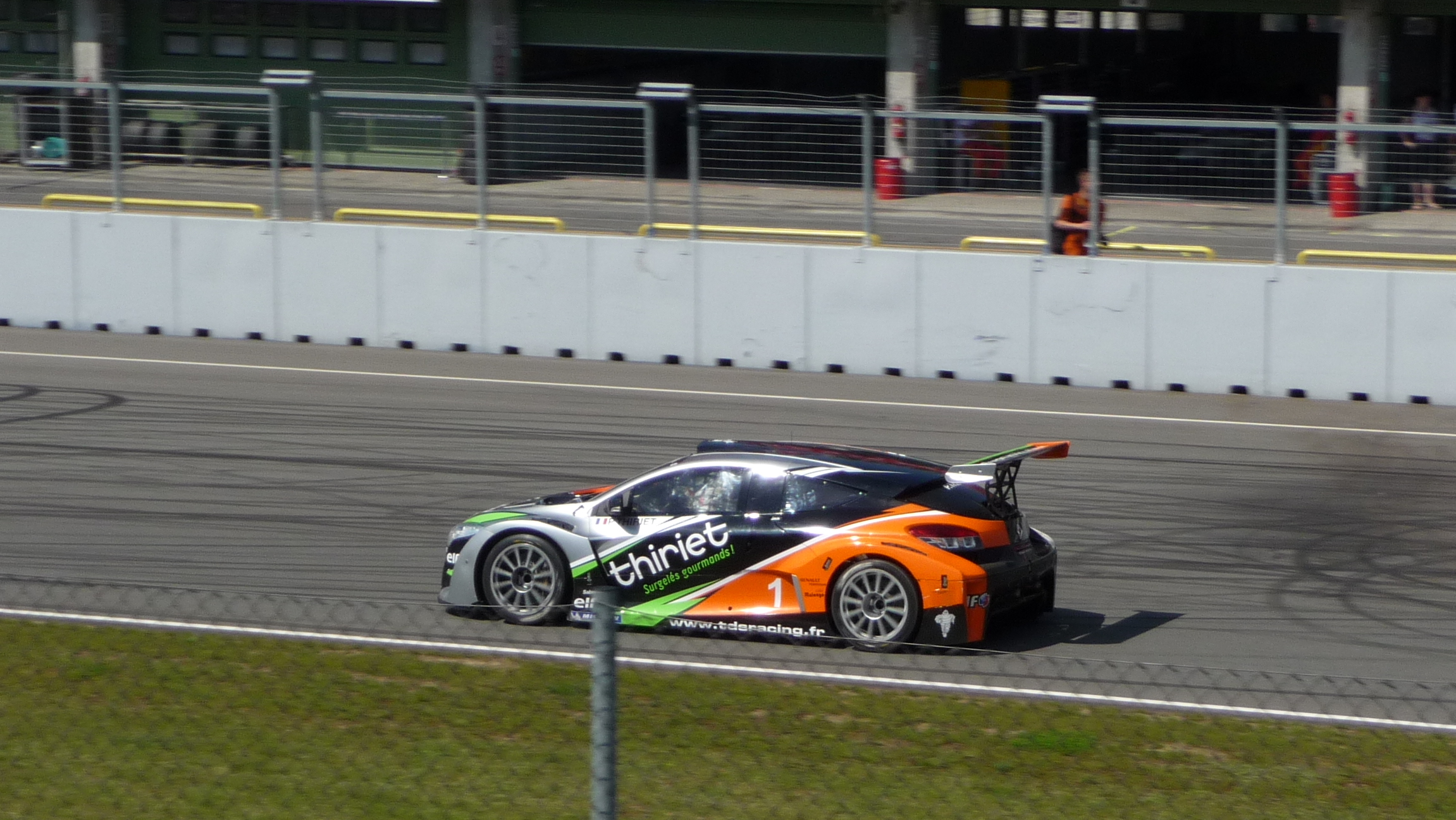
Thiriet in Eurocup Mégane Trophy's Brno round of 2010.

After competing in karting in 2003–04, Thiriet began racing in the Eurocup Mégane Trophy in 2009. Driving for TDS Racing, he finished fifth in the standings. Remaining with TDS for the 2010 season, Thiriet finished second in the standings behind teammate Nick Catsburg with two race wins.

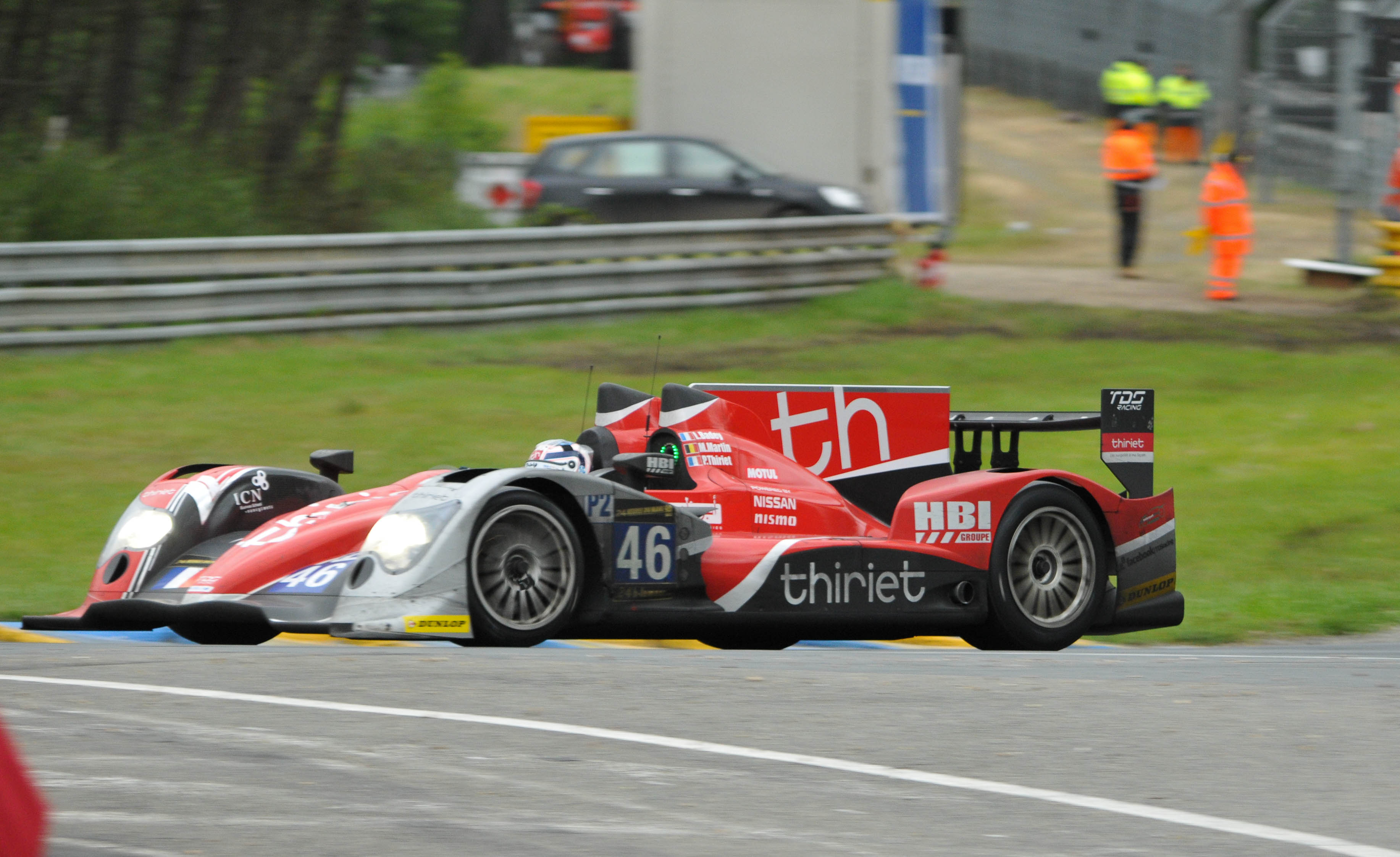
Thiriet spent much of his LMP2 career at TDS Racing, and won the 2012 ELMS title.

Thiriet followed TDS into sportscar racing in 2011, contesting the Le Mans Series in the LMP2 class in an Oreca 03 shared with Mathias Beche and Jody Firth. The trio won the rounds at Spa and Estoril and finished fourth in the final drivers' standings. Thiriet also contested the 2011 24 Hours of Le Mans in a Luxury Racing Ferrari 430, but the car failed to finish.

For 2012, LMP2 became the top class of the renamed European Le Mans Series. Partnering Beche, Thiriet and TDS won the opening round of the season at Paul Ricard and the season finale at Road Atlanta, securing his first major championship victory. For the 2012 24 Hours of Le Mans, they were joined by Christophe Tinseau and the car finished eighth overall and second in LMP2.

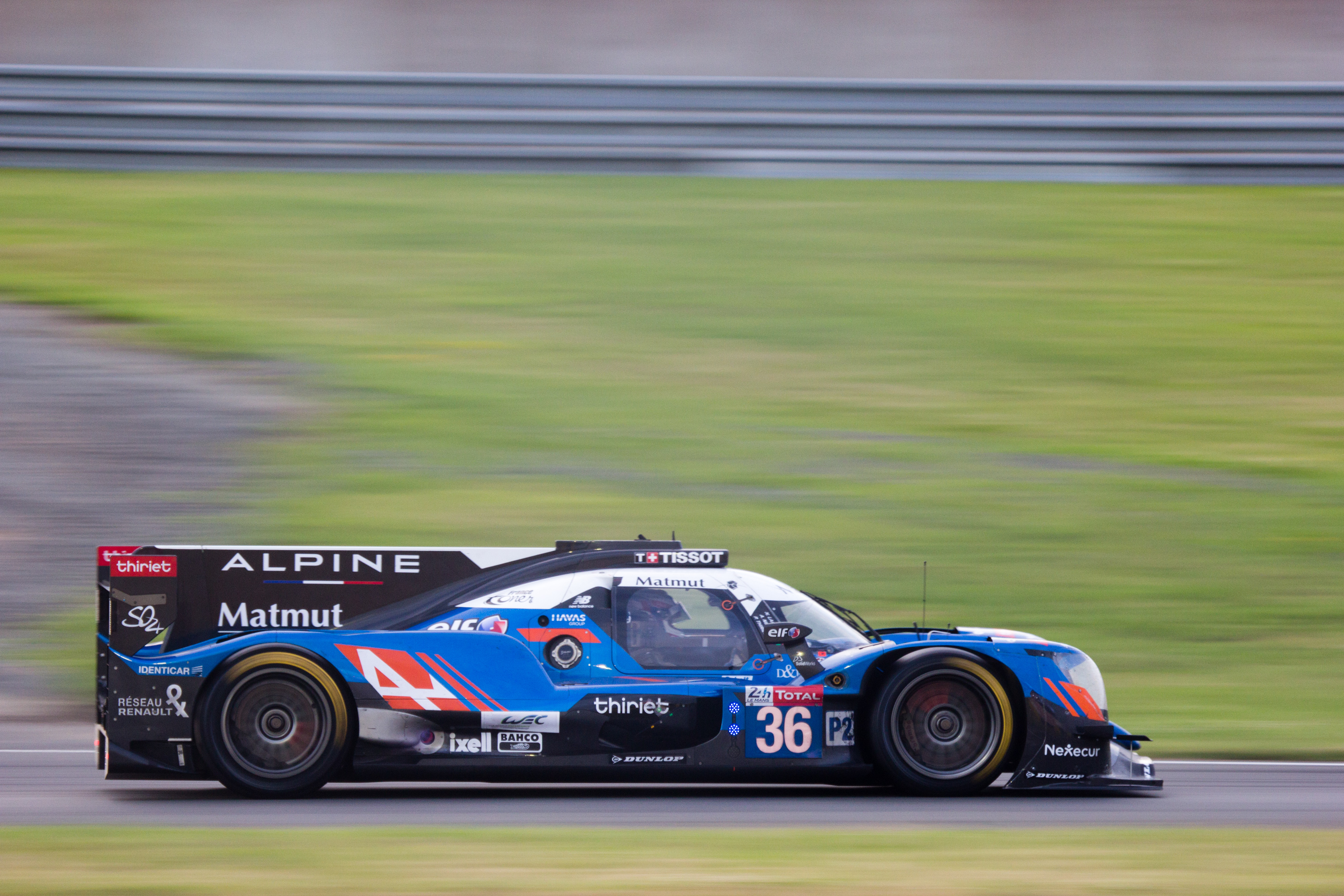
Thiriet won the 2018 and 2019 24 Hours of Le Mans in LMP2 for Signatech Alpine.

== Personal life ==
Thiriet is the son of Claude Thiriet, the founder of the French frozen food company Thiriet.

== Racing record ==
=== Complete Eurocup Mégane Trophy results ===
(key) (Races in bold indicate pole position) (Races in italics indicate fastest lap)

Year	Entrant	1	2	3	4	5	6	7	8	9	10	11	12	13	14	Rank	Points
2009	TDS Racing	CAT; 1; 4	CAT; 2; 8	SPA; 1; 5	SPA; 2; 2	HUN; 1 Ret	HUN; 2; 9	SIL; 1; 7	SIL; 2 Ret	LMS; 1; 9	LMS; 2; 7	NÜR; 1; 3	NÜR; 2; 5	ALC; 1; 5	ALC; 2 Ret	5th	65

=== Complete European Le Mans Series results ===
(key) (Races in bold indicate pole position) (Races in italics indicate fastest lap)

Year	Entrant	Class	Chassis	Engine	1	2	3	4	5	6	Rank	Points
2011	TDS Racing	LMP2	Oreca 03	Nissan VK45DE 4.5 L V8	**LEC**; Ret	SPA; 1	**IMO**; 7	SIL; Ret	EST; 1		4th	38
2012	Thiriet by TDS Racing	LMP2	Oreca 03	Nissan VK45DE 4.5 L V8	**LEC**; 1	DON; 2	PET; 1				1st	94
2013	Thiriet by TDS Racing	LMP2	Oreca 03	Nissan VK45DE 4.5 L V8	SIL; 3	IMO; 1	RBR; 1	HUN; 6	LEC; 8		2nd	77
2014	Thiriet by TDS Racing	LMP2	Morgan LMP2	Nissan VK45DE 4.5 L V8	SIL; 1	IMO; 5					8th	35
2014	Thiriet by TDS Racing	LMP2	Ligier JS P2	Nissan VK45DE 4.5 L V8			RBR; Ret	LEC; Ret	EST; Ret		8th	35
2015	Thiriet by TDS Racing	LMP2	Oreca 05	Nissan VK45DE 4.5 L V8	SIL; 3	IMO; 1	RBR; 2	LEC; 6	EST; 1		2nd	91
2016	Thiriet by TDS Racing	LMP2	Oreca 05	Nissan VK45DE 4.5 L V8	**SIL**; Ret	IMO; 1	RBR; 1	**LEC**; 1	SPA; 3	EST; 8	2nd	96
2018	Signatech Alpine Matmut	LMP2	Alpine A470	Gibson GK428 4.2 L V8	LEC; 5	MNZ	RBR	SIL	SPA	ALG	18th	10

^{*} Season still in progress.

=== 24 Hours of Le Mans results ===
Year	Team	Co-Drivers	Car	Class	Laps	Pos.	Class Pos.
2011	(France) Luxury Racing	(France) Anthony Beltoise (France) François Jakubowski	Ferrari 458 Italia GTC	GTE; Pro	136	DNF	DNF
2012	(France) Thiriet by TDS Racing	(Switzerland) Mathias Beche (France) Christophe Tinseau	Oreca 03-Nissan	LMP2	353	8th	**2nd**
2013	(France) Thiriet by TDS Racing	(France) Ludovic Badey (Belgium) Maxime Martin	Oreca 03-Nissan	LMP2	310	DNF	DNF
2014	(France) Thiriet by TDS Racing	(France) Ludovic Badey (France) Tristan Gommendy	Ligier JS P2-Nissan	LMP2	355	6th	**2nd**
2015	(France) Thiriet by TDS Racing	(France) Ludovic Badey (France) Tristan Gommendy	Oreca 05-Nissan	LMP2	204	DNF	DNF
2016	(France) Thiriet by TDS Racing	(Switzerland) Mathias Beche (Japan) Ryō Hirakawa	Oreca 05-Nissan	LMP2	241	DNF	DNF
2017	(Russia) G-Drive Racing	(Russia) Roman Rusinov (United Kingdom) Alex Lynn	Oreca 07-Gibson	LMP2	20	DNF	DNF
2018	(France) Signatech Alpine Matmut	(France) Nicolas Lapierre (Brazil) André Negrão	Alpine A470-Gibson	LMP2	367	5th	**1st**
2019	(France) Signatech Alpine Matmut	(France) Nicolas Lapierre (Brazil) André Negrão	Alpine A470-Gibson	LMP2	368	6th	**1st**

=== Complete FIA World Endurance Championship results ===
Year	Entrant	Class	Car	Engine	1	2	3	4	5	6	7	8	9	Rank	Points
2017	G-Drive Racing	LMP2	Oreca 07	Gibson GK428 4.2 L V8	**SIL**; 5	**SPA**; 1	**LMS**; Ret	NÜR; 6	MEX; 4	COA; 8	FUJ; 6	SHA	BHR	13th	70
2018–19	Signatech Alpine Matmut	LMP2	Alpine A470	Gibson GK428 4.2 L V8	**SPA**; 2	LMS; 1	SIL; 3	FUJ; 3	SHA; 3	SEB; 2	SPA; 2	LMS; 1		1st	181

Sporting positions
Preceded by Tom Kimber-Smith; Karim Ojjeh (Le Mans Series - LMP2)	European Le Mans Series; Champion; 2012; With: Mathias Beche	Succeeded by Pierre Ragues; Nelson Panciatici
Preceded by Bruno Senna; Julien Canal	FIA Endurance Trophy for LMP2 Drivers; 2018-19; With: Nicolas Lapierre & André Negrão	Succeeded by Filipe Albuquerque; Phil Hanson
