= Zytek Z11SN =

Le Mans racing car

Zytek Z11SN Gibson 015S
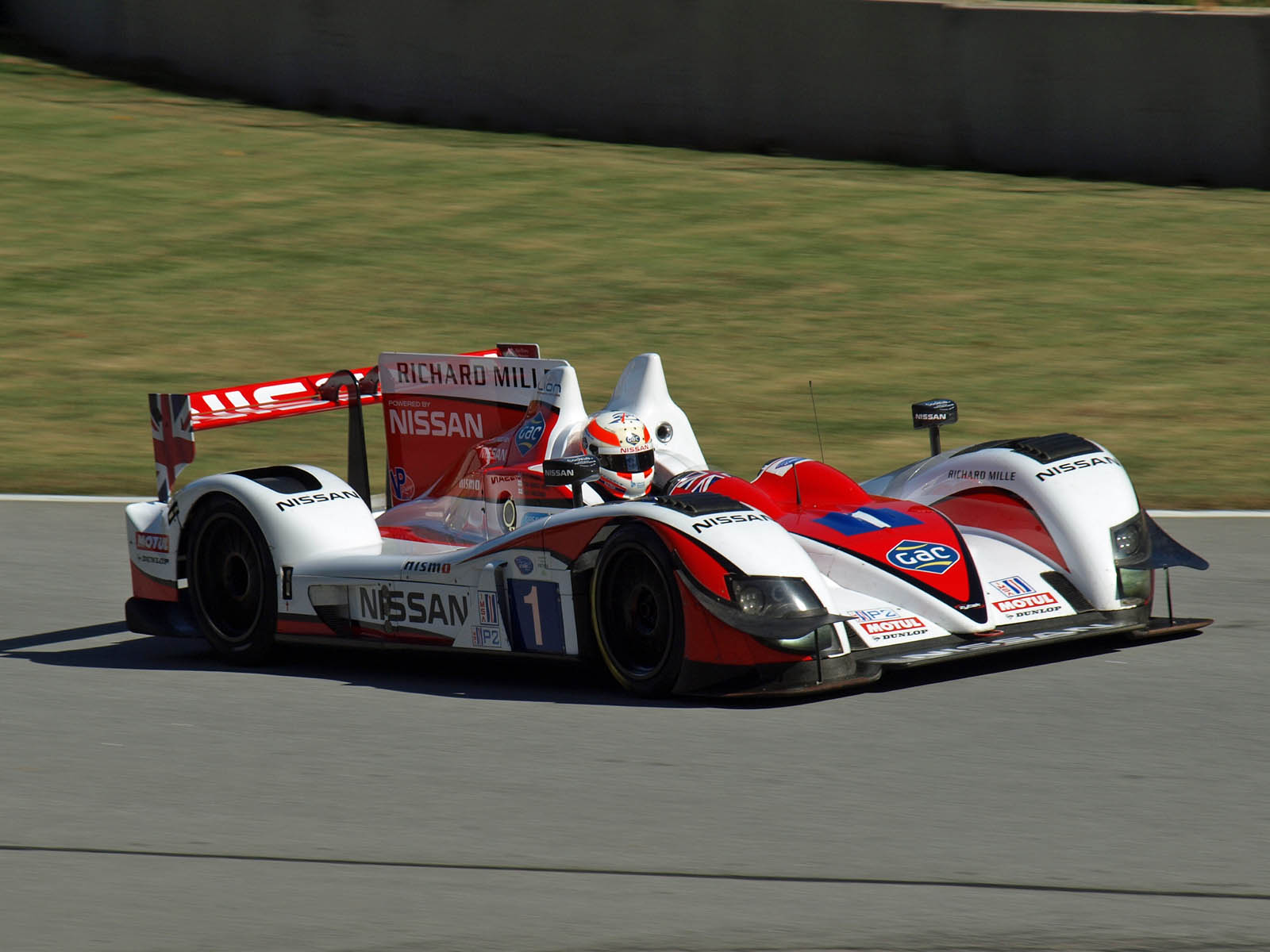
- The No. 1 Z11SN at the 2012 Petit Le Mans
- Category: LMP2
- Constructor: Zytek Engineering
- Designer: Tim Holloway
- Predecessor: Zytek 09SC

Technical specifications
- Chassis: Carbon-fibre composite monocoque
- Suspension (front): Independent double wishbone pushrod system with horizontal spring/damper unit
- Suspension (rear): Independent double wishbone pushrod system with horizontal spring/damper unit
- Length: 4,482 mm (176.5 in)
- Engine: NISMO VK45DE 4,494 cc (274.2 cu in) V8 NA mid-engine, longitudinally mounted
- Transmission: Ricardo 6-speed semi-automatic
- Power: 343 kW (460 hp)
- Weight: 900 kg (1,984.2 lb)
- Fuel: Total Excellium; Shell V-Power; BHP Infiniti
- Tyres: Dunlop

Competition history
- Notable entrants: (United Kingdom) Greaves Motorsport (United Kingdom) Jota Sport (United Kingdom) Caterham Motorsport
- Notable drivers: (United Kingdom) Martin Brundle (United Kingdom) Alex Brundle (Spain) Lucas Ordóñez (United Kingdom) Simon Dolan (United Kingdom) Oliver Turvey (Germany) Lucas Luhr (United States) Alexander Rossi (United Kingdom) Tom Kimber-Smith (Spain) Marc Gene (United Kingdom) Harry Tincknell
- Debut: 2011 6 Hours of Castellet
- Last event: 2016 4 Hours of Estoril
- Teams' Championships: 3 (2011 LMS (LMP2), 2015 ELMS, 2016 ELMS)
- Drivers' Championships: 3 (2011 LMS (LMP2), 2015 ELMS, 2016 ELMS)

The Zytek Z11SN is an LMP2-class racing car built by Zytek Engineering since 2011. Powered by a 4.5-litre Nissan V8 engine, it is an evolution of the Zytek 07S and the Zytek 09SC, updated for the new Le Mans Prototype regulations that were introduced in 2011. It was predominantly used in the European Le Mans Series and the 24 Hours of Le Mans, and a Greaves Motorsport-entered Z11SN won the LMP2 categories of both contests in 2011. In 2014, Jota Sport won the LMP2 category of the 24 Hours of Le Mans with a Z11SN.

In 2015, following Zytek's rebranding to Gibson Technology, the Z11SN was updated to the Gibson 015S.

== History ==
For 2011, the Le Mans Prototype rules were changed to reduce costs. As a result, the Ginetta-Zytek GZ09S became obsolete, and the Zytek 09SC, previously an LMP2-class car, became an LMP1-class car. In response to this, Zytek developed the car into the new Z11SN, and signed a deal with NISMO to use the Nissan GT-R Super GT's Nissan VK45DE engine. This was a 4.5 litre naturally-aspirated V8 engine, producing approximately 450 hp (336 kW; 456 PS) in LMP2 specification. Greaves Motorsport were the only team to enter a Z11SN in its first season, with their chassis having originally been a Zytek 07S. The car was immediately successful, with a debut class victory (and third overall) at the 6 Hours of Castellet, driven by Karim Ojjeh, Gary Chalandon and Tom Kimber-Smith. The season would prove to be a successful one; Greaves Motorsport took the class victory at the 24 Hours of Le Mans, and the LMP2 Team's Championship title in the Le Mans Series. At the end of the season, this chassis was retired, and three new ones were built.

For 2012, Jota Sport entered a Z11SN in the European Le Mans Series (ELMS), finishing eighth in class in the first round of the season, the 6 Hours of Castellet. Greaves Motorsport bought two chassis, and also entered them in the ELMS. Both teams also entered that year's 24 Hours of Le Mans, with Greaves' No. 42 car being the most notable entry – it was driven by former Formula 1 driver Martin Brundle, his son Alex, and Lucas Ordóñez. The No. 42 car finished eighth in class, whilst the other Greaves car finished fifth, and the Jota Sport entry failed to finish. Greaves Motorsport finished third in class the European Le Mans Series that year, whilst Jota Sport finished tenth.

In 2013, Greaves Motorsport and Jota Sport both remained in the European Le Mans Series with their Z11SN chassis. The season started successfully, with Jota Sport taking a victory at the 2013 6 Hours of Silverstone. Caterham Motorsport announced that they would be entering the 24 Hours of Le Mans for the first time, using a Z11SN, with Alexander Rossi, Tom Kimber-Smith and Eric Lux as their drivers. The entry was a joint venture between Caterham and Greaves Motorsport, with Greaves also entering a Z11SN under their own banner, driven by Jann Mardenborough, Lucas Ordóñez and Michael Krumm. Jota Sport also entered the event with a Z11SN, with their drivers Simon Dolan, Oliver Turvey and Lucas Luhr. The Greaves Motorsport entry was the most successful of the three, as Mardenborough, Ordonez and Krumm finished fourth in the LMP2 category.

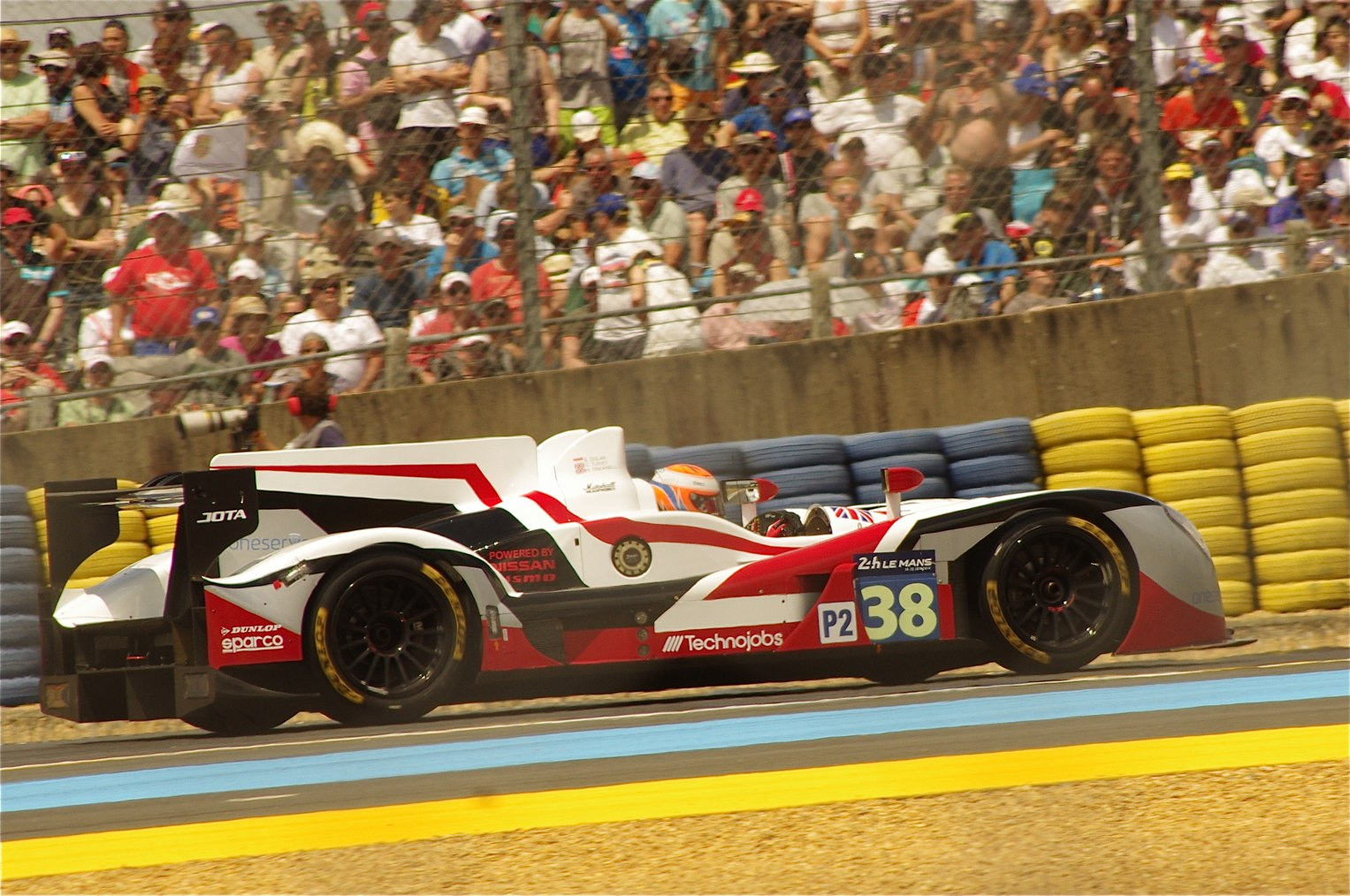
The No. 38 Jota car took the LMP2 class victory at the 24 Hours of Le Mans

In 2014, Jota Sport won the LMP2 class at the 2014 24 Hours of Le Mans with their Z11SN chassis.

For 2015, the car was substantially developed as the Gibson 015S, following the purchase of Zytek by Continental AG that established Gibson Technology. Jota Sport used it to finish second in the LMP2 class and 10th overall in the 2015 24 Hours of Le Mans, 48 seconds behind the KCMG's Oreca.

In 2016, Strakka Racing finished 4th in the LMP2 class and 8th overall in the 2016 24 Hours of Le Mans using the Gibson 015S, the highest result for the prototype in the race.

== Competition history ==
=== Complete European Le Mans Series results ===
(key) Races in bold indicates pole position. Races in italics indicates fastest lap.

Complete European Le Mans Series results
Year	Entrant	Class	Drivers	No.	Rds.	Rounds						Pts.	Pos.
Year	Entrant	Class	Drivers	No.	Rds.	1	2	3	4	5	6	Pts.	Pos.
2011	(United Kingdom) Greaves Motorsport	LMP2	(Saudi Arabia) Karim Ojjeh (United Kingdom) Tom Kimber-Smith (France) Gary Chalandon (France) Olivier Lombard	41	All; All; 1-2; 3-5	LEC; 1	SPA; 8	IMO; 1	SIL; 1	**EST**; **2**		64	1st
2012	(United Kingdom) Greaves Motorsport	LMP2	(United Kingdom) Alex Brundle (United Kingdom) Tom Kimber-Smith (Spain) Lucas Ordóñez (United Kingdom) Alex Buncombe	1	All; All; 1-2; 3	LEC; 4	DON; 7	ATL; 5				48	3rd
2012	(United Kingdom) Jota	LMP2	(United Kingdom) Sam Hancock (United Kingdom) Simon Dolan	38	1-2; 1-2	LEC; 9	DON; Ret	ATL				2	10th
2013	(United Kingdom) Greaves Motorsport	LMP2	(United States) Chris Dyson (United States) Michael Marsal (Denmark) David Heinemeier Hansson (United Kingdom) Tom Kimber-Smith	3	1; 1; 2; 2	SIL; Ret	IMO; 5	RBR	HUN	LEC		10	9th
2013	(United Kingdom) Jota Sport	LMP2	(United Kingdom) Simon Dolan (United Kingdom) Oliver Turvey	38	All; All	**SIL**; **1**	**IMO**; **Ret**	**RBR**; **4**	HUN; 3	**LEC**; **3**		71	3rd
2014	(United Kingdom) Greaves Motorsport	LMP2	(United Kingdom) James Littlejohn (United Kingdom) James Walker (United Kingdom) Anthony Wells (United Kingdom) Luciano Bacheta (Russia) Mark Shulzhitskiy	28	1; 1; 1; 3-5; 3-5	SIL; 6	IMO	RBR; 4	LEC; 5	EST; Ret		30	8th
2014	(United Kingdom) Greaves Motorsport	LMP2	(United States) Matt McMurry (United Kingdom) Tom Kimber-Smith (United States) Chris Dyson (United States) Mark Patterson (United Kingdom) Johnny Mowlem (Portugal) Miguel Faísca (United Kingdom) James Fletcher	41	All; 1-3; 1; 3; 4; 5; 5	SIL; 4	IMO; 4	RBR; 6	LEC; Ret	EST; 7		38	6th
2014	(United Kingdom) Jota Sport	LMP2	(Portugal) Filipe Albuquerque (United Kingdom) Simon Dolan (United Kingdom) Harry Tincknell	38	All; All; All	**SIL**; **Ret**	**IMO**; **1**	**RBR**; **2**	LEC; 4	**EST**; **3**		74	2nd
2015	(United Kingdom) Jota Sport	LMP2	(Portugal) Filipe Albuquerque (United Kingdom) Simon Dolan (United Kingdom) Harry Tincknell	38	All; All; All	SIL; 2	**IMO**; **3**	**RBR**; **1**	**LEC**; **3**	**EST**; **4**		89	3rd
2015	(United Kingdom) Greaves Motorsport	LMP2	(Switzerland) Gary Hirsch (United Kingdom) Jon Lancaster (Sweden) Björn Wirdheim	41	All; All; All	**SIL**; **1**	IMO; 4	RBR; 4	LEC; 1	EST; 2		93	1st
2016	(Russia) G-Drive Racing	LMP2	(United Kingdom) Simon Dolan (Netherlands) Giedo van der Garde (United Kingdom) Harry Tincknell	38	All; All; All	|SIL; 1	IMO; 2	RBR; 3	LEC; 5	SPA; 5	EST; 1	103	1st

=== Complete World Endurance Championship results ===
(key) Races in bold indicates pole position. Races in italics indicates fastest lap.

Complete World Endurance Championship results
Year	Entrant	Class	Drivers	No.	Rds.	Rounds									Pts.	Pos.
Year	Entrant	Class	Drivers	No.	Rds.	1	2	3	4	5	6	7	8	9	Pts.	Pos.
2012	(United Kingdom) Jota	LMP2	(United Kingdom) Sam Hancock (United Kingdom) Simon Dolan (Japan) Haruki Kurosawa (France) Nicolas Minassian	38	2-4; 2-4; 3; 4	SEB	SPA; 1	LMS; Ret	SIL; 7	SÃO	BHR	FUJ	SHA		0	NC
2012	(United Kingdom) Greaves Motorsport	LMP2	(United States) Elton Julian (Germany) Christian Zugel (Mexico) Ricardo González (Mexico) Roberto González	41	All; All; 1-4, 6–8; 5	SEB; 4	SPA; 7	LMS; 5	SIL; 13	SÃO; 4	BHR; 7	FUJ; 7	SHA; 8		99	5th
2012	(United Kingdom) Greaves Motorsport	LMP2	(United Kingdom) Alex Brundle (United Kingdom) Martin Brundle (Spain) Lucas Ordoñez	42	3-4; 3-4; 3-4	SEB	SPA	LMS; 8	SIL; 5	SÃO	BHR	FUJ	SHA		0	NC
2013	(Japan) Gainer International	LMP2	(Japan) Katsuyuki Hiranaka (Japan) Masayuki Ueda (Sweden) Björn Wirdheim	27	6; 6; 6	SIL	SPA	LMS	SÃO	COA	FUJ; 3	SHA	BHR		0	NC
2013	(United Kingdom) Greaves Motorsport	LMP2	(United States) Chris Dyson (United States) Michael Marsal (United Kingdom) Tom Kimber-Smith (United States) Alexander Rossi (United States) Eric Lux (Germany) Christian Zugel (United States) Gunnar Jeannette (Sweden) Björn Wirdheim (Russia) Mark Shulzhitskiy (Belgium) Wolfgang Reip (United Kingdom) Jon Lancaster	41	1-2, 5; 1-2; 1-3, 5; 3; 3, 7; 4-5; 4; 4, 7–8; 7; 8; 8	SIL; 5	SPA; DNS	LMS; 10	SÃO; 4	COA; 5	FUJ	SHA; 5	BHR; 3		81	5th
2013	(United Kingdom) Greaves Motorsport	LMP2	(Germany) Michael Krumm (United Kingdom) Jann Mardenborough (Spain) Lucas Ordóñez	42	3; 3; 3	SIL	SPA	LMS; 3	SÃO	COA	FUJ	SHA	BHR		0	NC
2013	(United Kingdom) Jota Sport	LMP2	(United Kingdom) Simon Dolan (United Kingdom) Oliver Turvey (Germany) Lucas Luhr	38	2-3; 2-3; 2-3	SIL	SPA; 3	LMS; 7	SÃO	COA	FUJ	SHA	BHR		0	NC
2014	(United Kingdom) Jota Sport	LMP2	(United Kingdom) Simon Dolan (United Kingdom) Harry Tincknell (Spain) Marc Gené (United Kingdom) Oliver Turvey	38	2-3; 2-3; 2; 3	SIL	SPA; 2	LMS; 1	COA	FUJ	SHA	BHR	SÃO		0	NC
2014	(United Kingdom) Greaves Motorsport	LMP2	(United Kingdom) Michael Munemann (United Kingdom) Alessandro Latif (United Kingdom) James Winslow	41	3; 3; 3	SIL	SPA	LMS; Ret	COA	FUJ	SHA	BHR	SÃO		0	NC
2014	(Malaysia) Caterham Racing	LMP2	(United Kingdom) Tom Kimber-Smith (United States) Chris Dyson (United States) Matt McMurry	42	3; 3; 3	SIL	SPA	LMS; 11	COA	FUJ	SHA	BHR	SÃO		0	NC
2015	(United Kingdom) Jota Sport	LMP2	(United Kingdom) Simon Dolan (New Zealand) Mitch Evans (United Kingdom) Harry Tincknell (United Kingdom) Oliver Turvey	38	2-3; 2-3; 2; 3	SIL	SPA; 1	LMS; 2	NÜR	COA	FUJ	SHA	BHR		0	NC
2015	(United Kingdom) Greaves Motorsport	LMP2	(Switzerland) Gary Hirsch (United Kingdom) Jon Lancaster (France) Gaëtan Paletou	41	3; 3; 3	SIL	SPA	LMS; Ret	NÜR	COA	FUJ	SHA	BHR		0	NC
2015	(United Kingdom) Strakka Racing	LMP2	(United Kingdom) Nick Leventis (United Kingdom) Jonny Kane (United Kingdom) Danny Watts	42	4-8; 4-8; 4-8	SIL	SPA	LMS	NÜR; 7	COA; 7	FUJ; 6	SHA; 6	BHR; 6		73*	6th*
2016	(Russia) G-Drive Racing	LMP2	(United Kingdom) Simon Dolan (United Kingdom) Jake Dennis (Netherlands) Giedo van der Garde	38	2-3; 2-3; 2-3	SIL	SPA; 6	LMS; Ret	NÜR	MEX	COA	FUJ	SHA	BHR	0	NC
2016	(United Kingdom) Greaves Motorsport	LMP2	(Mexico) Roberto González (Mexico) Luis Díaz (Brazil) Bruno Junqueira	41	5; 5; 5	SIL	SPA	LMS	NÜR	MEX; 5	COA	FUJ	SHA	BHR	0	NC
2016	(United Kingdom) Strakka Racing	LMP2	(United Kingdom) Jonny Kane (United Kingdom) Nick Leventis (United Kingdom) Danny Watts (United Kingdom) Lewis Williamson	42	1-7; 1-6; 1-3; 4-7	SIL; 5	SPA; Ret	LMS; 4	NÜR; 4	MEX; 4	COA; Ret	FUJ; 6	SHA	BHR	66	7th

* Points were scored with the Strakka-Dome S103

=== Complete American Le Mans Series results ===
(key) Races in bold indicates pole position. Races in italics indicates fastest lap.

Complete American Le Mans Series results
Year	Entrant	Class	Drivers	No.	Rds.	Rounds										Pts.	Pos.
Year	Entrant	Class	Drivers	No.	Rds.	1	2	3	4	5	6	7	8	9	10	Pts.	Pos.
2013	(United Kingdom) Greaves Motorsport	P2	(United Kingdom) Tom Kimber-Smith (Germany) Christian Zugel (United States) Eric Lux	41	1; 1; 1	SEB; 3	LBH	LAG	LRP	MOS	ELK	BAL	COA	VIR	PET	0	NC
