= Ferrari F136 engine =

Ferrari F136 V8 Engine
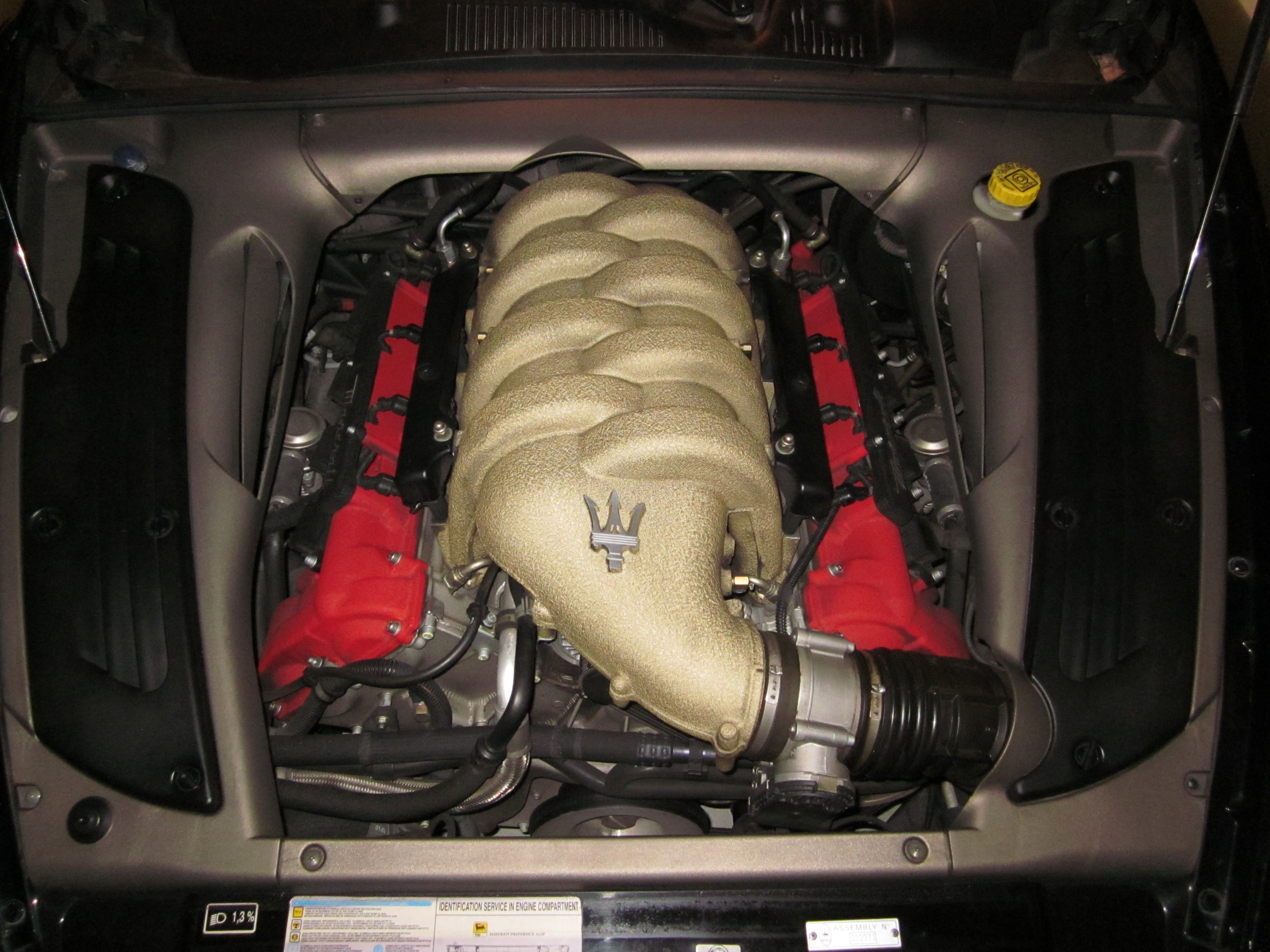
- Maserati Coupé V8 engine, type F136 R

Overview
- Manufacturer: (Italy) Ferrari
- Also called: Ferrari-Maserati V8
- Production: 2001–2020

Layout
- Configuration: 90° V8; 180° flat-plane crankshaft (Ferrari) / 90° cross-plane crankshaft (Maserati, Alfa Romeo)
- Displacement: 4.2 L (4,244 cc); 4.3 L (4,297 cc); 4.3 L (4,308 cc); 4.5 L (4,497 cc); 4.7 L (4,691 cc)
- Cylinder bore: 92 mm (3.6 in); 94 mm (3.7 in)
- Piston stroke: 79.8 mm (3.1 in); 77.4 mm (3.0 in); 81 mm (3.2 in); 84.5 mm (3.3 in)
- Valvetrain: DOHC, 32-valve

Combustion
- Fuel system: Direct injection Multi-port injection
- Fuel type: Petrol
- Oil system: Dry sump / Wet sump
- Cooling system: Water cooled

Output
- Power output: 385–597 hp (287–445 kW; 390–605 PS)
- Torque output: 333–397 lb⋅ft (451–538 N⋅m)

Chronology
- Predecessor: Ferrari F131 engine Maserati 3.2L V8
- Successor: Ferrari F154 engine

The F136, commonly known as Ferrari-Maserati engineblock, is a family of 90° V8 petrol engines jointly developed by Ferrari and Maserati and produced by Ferrari; these engines displace between 4.2 L and 4.7 L, and produce between 390 PS (287 kW; 385 hp) and 605 PS (445 kW; 597 hp). All engines are naturally aspirated, incorporate dual overhead camshafts, variable valve timing, and four valves per cylinder.

The architecture was produced in various configurations for Ferrari and Maserati automobiles, and the Alfa Romeo 8C. Production started in 2001. Ferrari was spun-off from their common parent company in January 2016 and has stated they will not renew the contract to supply engines to Maserati by 2022.

Starting with the 2013 Maserati Quattroporte GTS, and following with the 2014 Ferrari California T, the F136 was replaced by the twin turbocharged Ferrari F154 V8 engine.

== Applications ==
Maserati and Alfa Romeo versions have crossplane crankshafts, while Ferrari versions are flat plane.

=== Maserati ===
==== Road engines ====
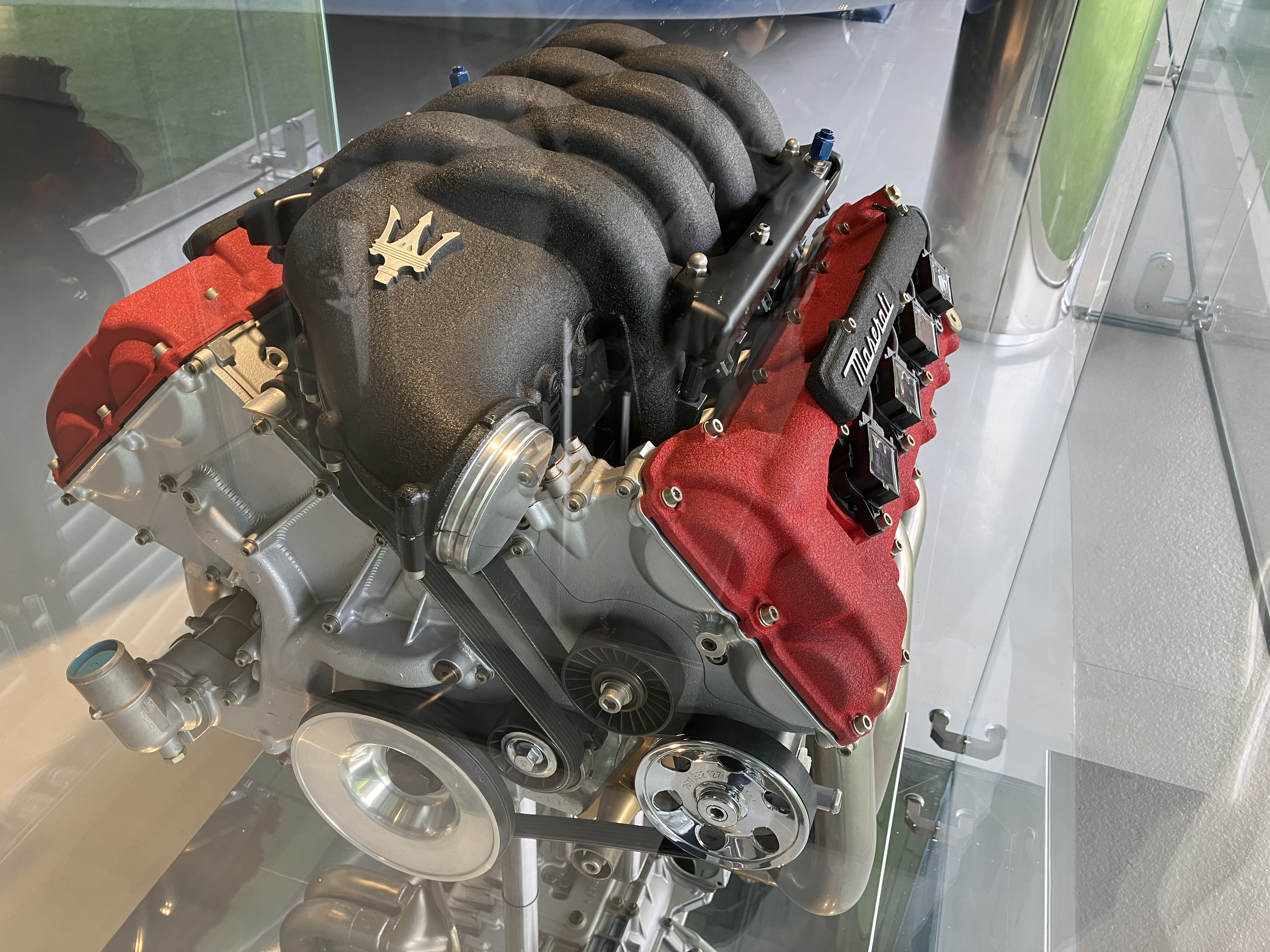
Maserati F136 at the Maserati Modena showroom

Engine Data & Variants sourced from the Maserati Academy.

Engine	Displacement	Engine variant	Years	Model	Power	Torque	Notes
F136 R	4,244 cc (259 cu in); 92 x 79.8 mm		2001–2007	Maserati Coupé; Maserati Spyder	390 PS (287 kW; 385 hp)	451 N⋅m (333 lb⋅ft) at 4500 rpm	dry sump
F136 R	4,244 cc (259 cu in); 92 x 79.8 mm	F136 RB	2004–2007	Maserati GranSport; Maserati GranSport Spyder	400 PS (294 kW; 395 hp)	452 N⋅m (333 lb⋅ft) at 4500 rpm	dry sump
F136 S	4,244 cc (259 cu in); 92 x 79.8 mm		2003–2008	Maserati Quattroporte DuoSelect	400 PS (294 kW; 395 hp)	451 N⋅m (333 lb⋅ft) at 4500 rpm	dry sump
F136 U	4,244 cc (259 cu in); 92 x 79.8 mm	F136 UC	2007–2008	Maserati Quattroporte Automatica	400 PS (294 kW; 395 hp)	452 N⋅m (333 lb⋅ft) at 4500 rpm	wet sump, standard hydraulic tappets
F136 U	4,244 cc (259 cu in); 92 x 79.8 mm	F136 UC; F136 UE	2008–2013	Maserati Quattroporte	400 PS (294 kW; 395 hp)	460 N⋅m (339 lb⋅ft) at 4250 rpm	wet sump, standard hydraulic tappets
F136 U	4,244 cc (259 cu in); 92 x 79.8 mm	F136 UD	2007–2009	Maserati GranTurismo	405 PS (298 kW; 399 hp)	460 N⋅m (339 lb⋅ft) at 4250 rpm	wet sump, standard hydraulic tappets
F136 U	4,244 cc (259 cu in); 92 x 79.8 mm	F136 UF	2010–2017	Maserati GranTurismo	405 PS (298 kW; 399 hp)	460 N⋅m (339 lb⋅ft) at 4250 rpm	wet sump, standard hydraulic tappets
F136 Y	4,691 cc (286 cu in); 94 x 84.5 mm	F136 YG	2008–2010	Maserati Quattroporte S	430 PS (316 kW; 424 hp)	490 N⋅m (362 lb⋅ft) at 4750 rpm	wet sump, standard hydraulic tappets
F136 Y	4,691 cc (286 cu in); 94 x 84.5 mm	F136 YL	2011	Maserati Quattroporte S	430 PS (316 kW; 424 hp)	490 N⋅m (362 lb⋅ft) at 4750 rpm	wet sump, hydraulic tappets with DLC finish/reed valves
F136 Y	4,691 cc (286 cu in); 94 x 84.5 mm	F136 YR	2012	Maserati Quattroporte S	440 PS (324 kW; 434 hp)	490 N⋅m (362 lb⋅ft) at 4750 rpm	wet sump, hydraulic tappets with DLC finish/reed valves
F136 Y	4,691 cc (286 cu in); 94 x 84.5 mm	F136 YH	2008-2010	Maserati Quattroporte Sport GT S	440 PS (324 kW; 434 hp)	490 N⋅m (362 lb⋅ft) at 4750 rpm	wet sump, standard hydraulic tappets
F136 Y	4,691 cc (286 cu in); 94 x 84.5 mm	F136 YM	2011	Maserati Quattroporte Sport GT S	440 PS (324 kW; 434 hp)	490 N⋅m (362 lb⋅ft) at 4750 rpm	wet sump, hydraulic tappets with DLC finish/reed valves
F136 Y	4,691 cc (286 cu in); 94 x 84.5 mm	F136 YT	2012	Maserati Quattroporte Sport GT S	450 PS (331 kW; 444 hp)	510 N⋅m (376 lb⋅ft) at 4750 rpm	wet sump, hydraulic tappets with DLC finish/reed valves
F136 Y	4,691 cc (286 cu in); 94 x 84.5 mm	F136 YE	2008–2010	Maserati GranTurismo S	440 PS (324 kW; 434 hp)	490 N⋅m (362 lb⋅ft) at 4750 rpm	wet sump, standard hydraulic tappets
F136 Y	4,691 cc (286 cu in); 94 x 84.5 mm	F136 YH	2008–2010	Maserati GranTurismo S Automatic	440 PS (324 kW; 434 hp)	490 N⋅m (362 lb⋅ft) at 4750 rpm	wet sump, standard hydraulic tappets
F136 Y	4,691 cc (286 cu in); 94 x 84.5 mm	F136 YI	2008–2010	Maserati GranCabrio	440 PS (324 kW; 434 hp)	490 N⋅m (362 lb⋅ft) at 4750 rpm	wet sump, standard hydraulic tappets
F136 Y	4,691 cc (286 cu in); 94 x 84.5 mm	F136 YN	2011	Maserati GranTurismo S; Maserati GranCabrio	440 PS (324 kW; 434 hp)	490 N⋅m (362 lb⋅ft) at 4750 rpm	wet sump, hydraulic tappets with DLC finish/reed valves
F136 Y	4,691 cc (286 cu in); 94 x 84.5 mm	F136 YK	2010-2011	Maserati GranTurismo MC Stradale; Maserati GranTurismo S	450 PS (331 kW; 444 hp)	510 N⋅m (376 lb⋅ft) at 4750 rpm	wet sump, hydraulic tappets with DLC finish/reed valves
F136 Y	4,691 cc (286 cu in); 94 x 84.5 mm	F136 YP	2011–2017	Maserati GranTurismo Sport; Maserati GranCabrio Sport; Maserati GranCabrio	450 PS (331 kW; 444 hp)	510 N⋅m (376 lb⋅ft) at 4750 rpm	wet sump, hydraulic tappets with DLC finish/reed valves
F136 Y	4,691 cc (286 cu in); 94 x 84.5 mm	F136 YQ	2012–2017	Maserati GranTurismo Sport; Maserati GranTurismo MC Stradale	460 PS (338 kW; 454 hp)	520 N⋅m (384 lb⋅ft) at 4750 rpm	wet sump, hydraulic tappets with DLC finish/reed valves
F136 Y	4,691 cc (286 cu in); 94 x 84.5 mm	F136 YS	2012–2019	Maserati GranTurismo Sport; Maserati GranTurismo MC Auto; Maserati GranCabrio Sport; Maserati GranCabrio MC	460 PS (338 kW; 454 hp)	520 N⋅m (384 lb⋅ft) at 4750 rpm	wet sump, hydraulic tappets with DLC finish/reed valves

==== Racing engines ====
Engine	Displacement	Years	Model	Power	Torque	Notes
F136	4,244 cc (259 cu in); 92 x 79.8 mm	2003	Coupé Trofeo	415–420 PS (305–309 kW; 409–414 hp)	460 N⋅m (339 lb⋅ft) at 4500 rpm	dry sump
F136	4,244 cc (259 cu in); 92 x 79.8 mm	2004	Trofeo Light	430 PS (316 kW; 424 hp)	460 N⋅m (339 lb⋅ft) at 4500 rpm	dry sump
F136	4,691 cc (286.3 cu in); 94 x 84.5 mm	2009	GranTurismo MC GT4	450 PS (331 kW; 444 hp)	510 N⋅m (376 lb⋅ft)	
F136	4,691 cc (286.3 cu in); 94 x 84.5 mm	2013	GranTurismo MC GT3	530 PS (390 kW; 523 hp)		

=== Ferrari ===
==== Road engines ====
Engine	Displacement	Engine variant	Years	Usage	Power	Torque	Notes
F136 E	4,308 cc (263 cu in); 92 x 81 mm		2004–2009	Ferrari F430; Ferrari F430 Spider	490 PS (360 kW; 483 hp)	465 N⋅m (343 lb⋅ft) at 5250 rpm	dry sump
F136 E	4,308 cc (263 cu in); 92 x 81 mm	F136 ED	2007–2009	Ferrari 430 Scuderia; Ferrari Scuderia Spider 16M	510 PS (375 kW; 503 hp)	471 N⋅m (347 lb⋅ft) at 5250 rpm	dry sump
F136 I	4,297 cc (262 cu in); 94 x 77.4 mm	F136 IB	2009–2012	Ferrari California	460 PS (338 kW; 454 hp)	485 N⋅m (358 lbf⋅ft) at 5000 rpm	direct injection, wet sump
F136 I	4,297 cc (262 cu in); 94 x 77.4 mm	F136 IH	2012–2014	Ferrari California 30	490 PS (360 kW; 483 hp)	505 Nm (372 ft-lbs) at 5000 rpm	direct injection, wet sump
F136 F	4,497 cc (274 cu in); 94 x 81 mm	F136 FB	2009–2015	Ferrari 458 Italia; Ferrari 458 Spider	570 PS (419 kW; 562 hp)	540 N⋅m (398 lb⋅ft) at 6000 rpm	direct injection, dry sump
F136 F	4,497 cc (274 cu in); 94 x 81 mm	F136 FL	2013–2015	Ferrari 458 Speciale; Ferrari 458 Speciale A	605 PS (445 kW; 597 hp)	540 N⋅m (398 lb⋅ft) at 6000 rpm	direct injection, dry sump

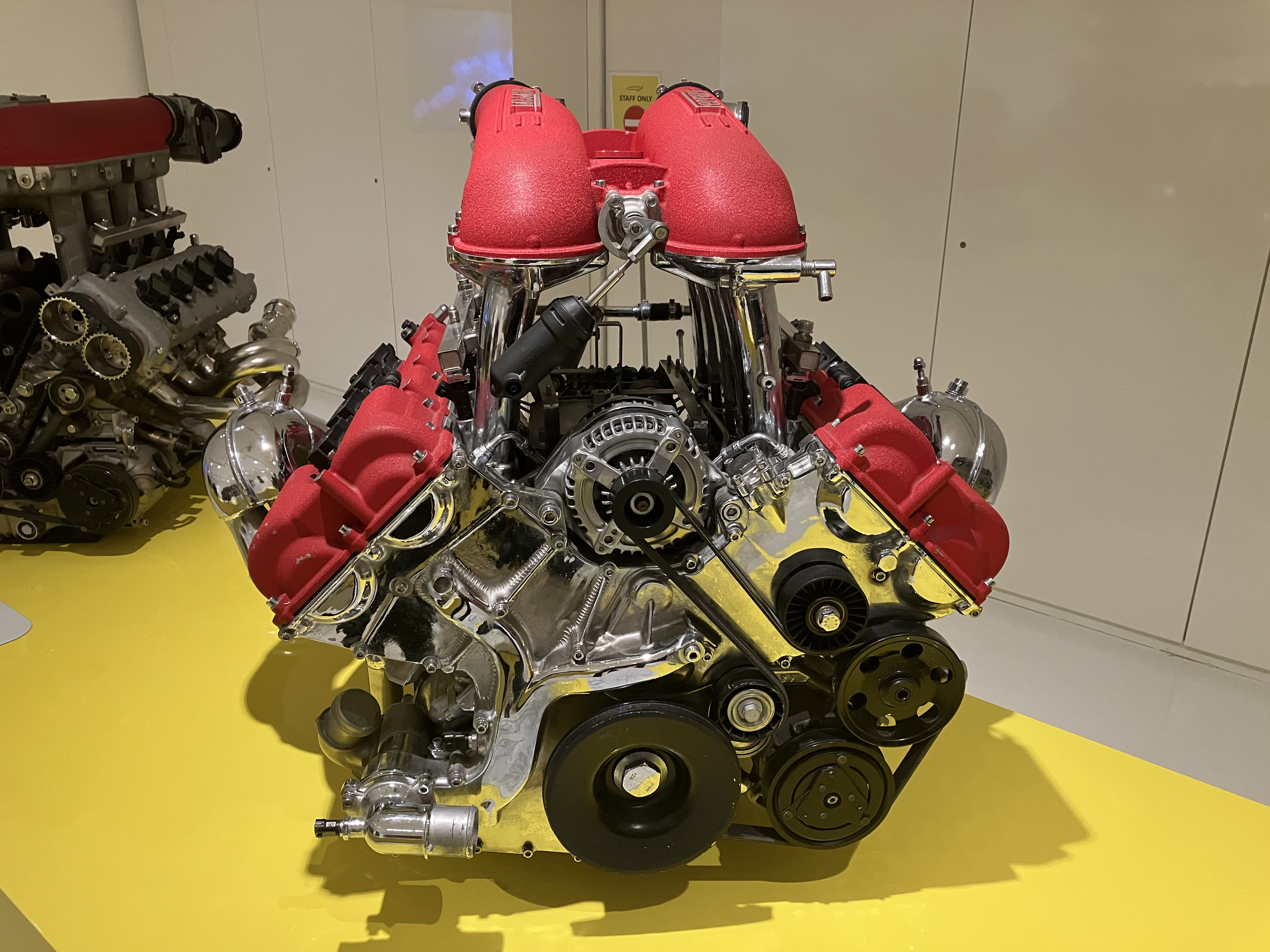
F136E at the Museo Casa Enzo Ferrari

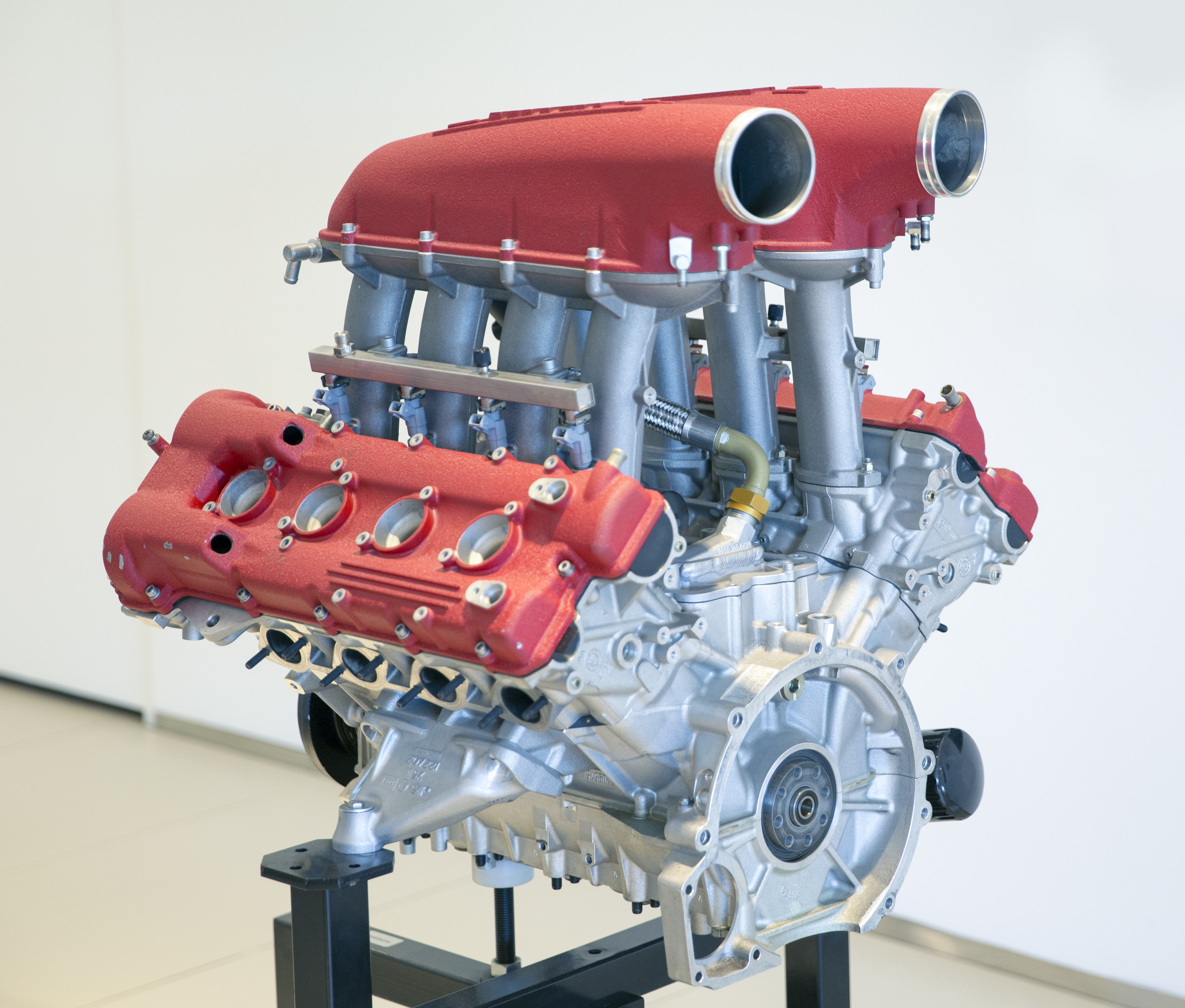
F136E engine, rear left

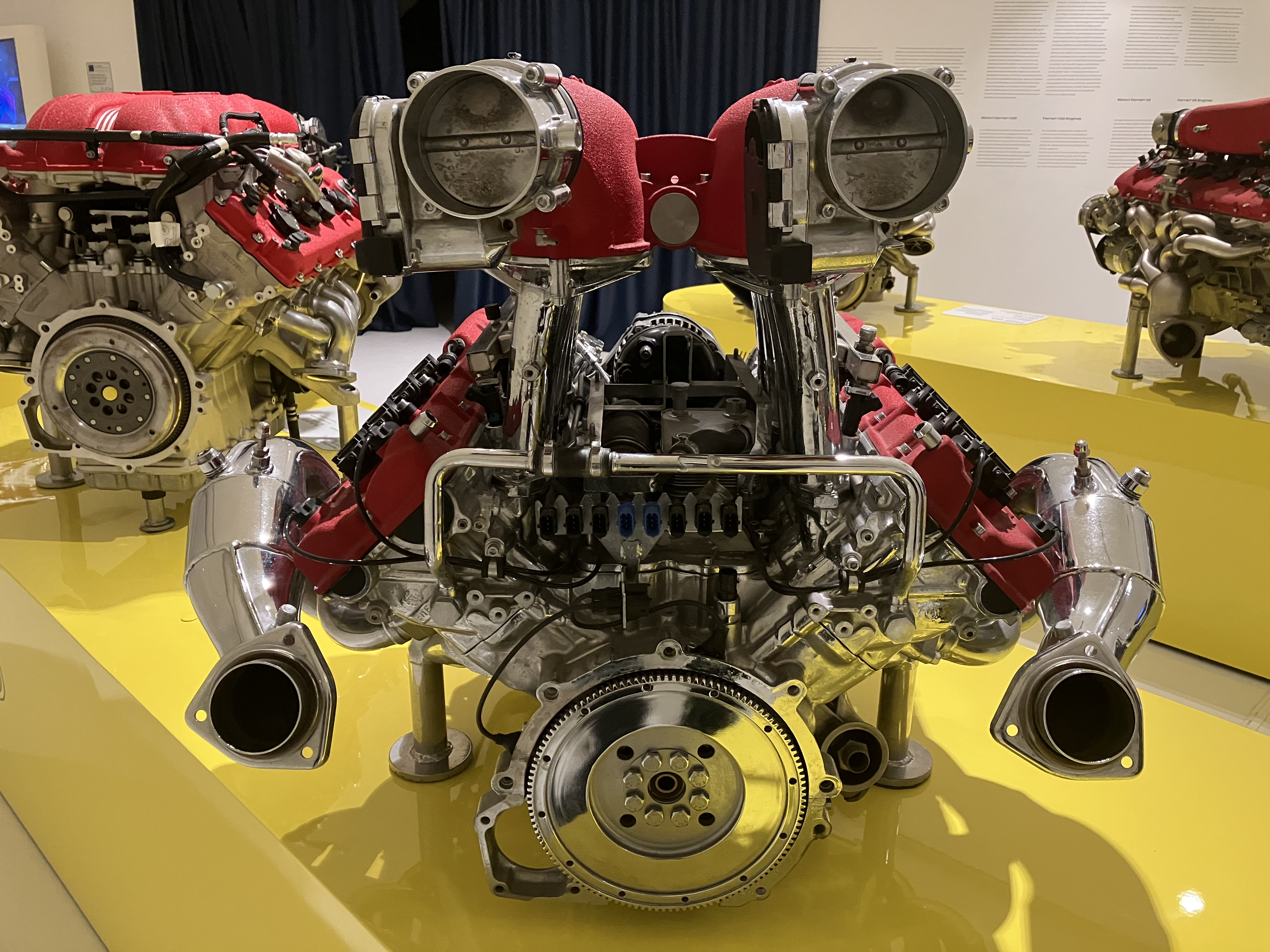
F136E at the Museo Casa Enzo Ferrari

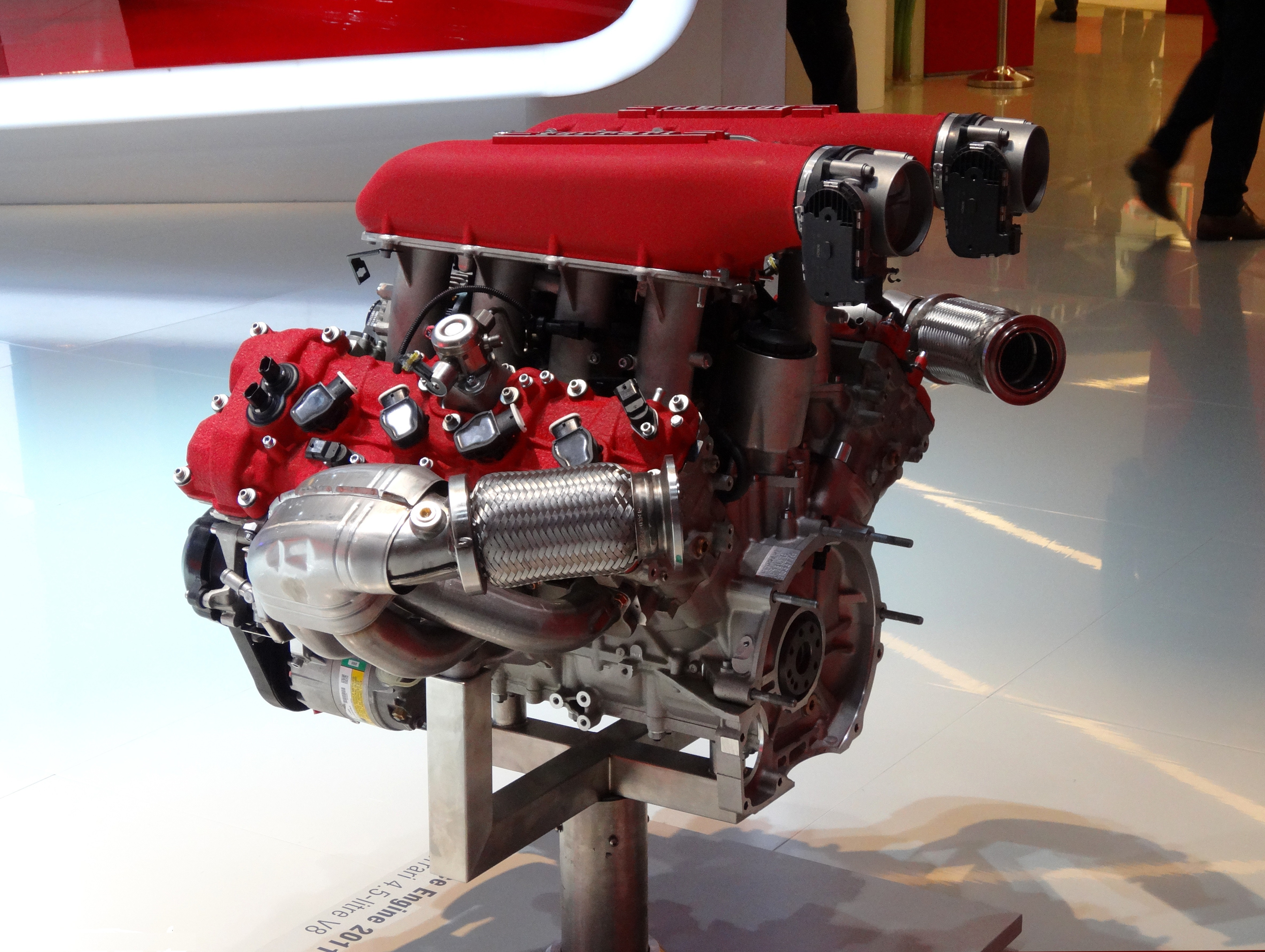
The Tipo F136 FB engine from a 458

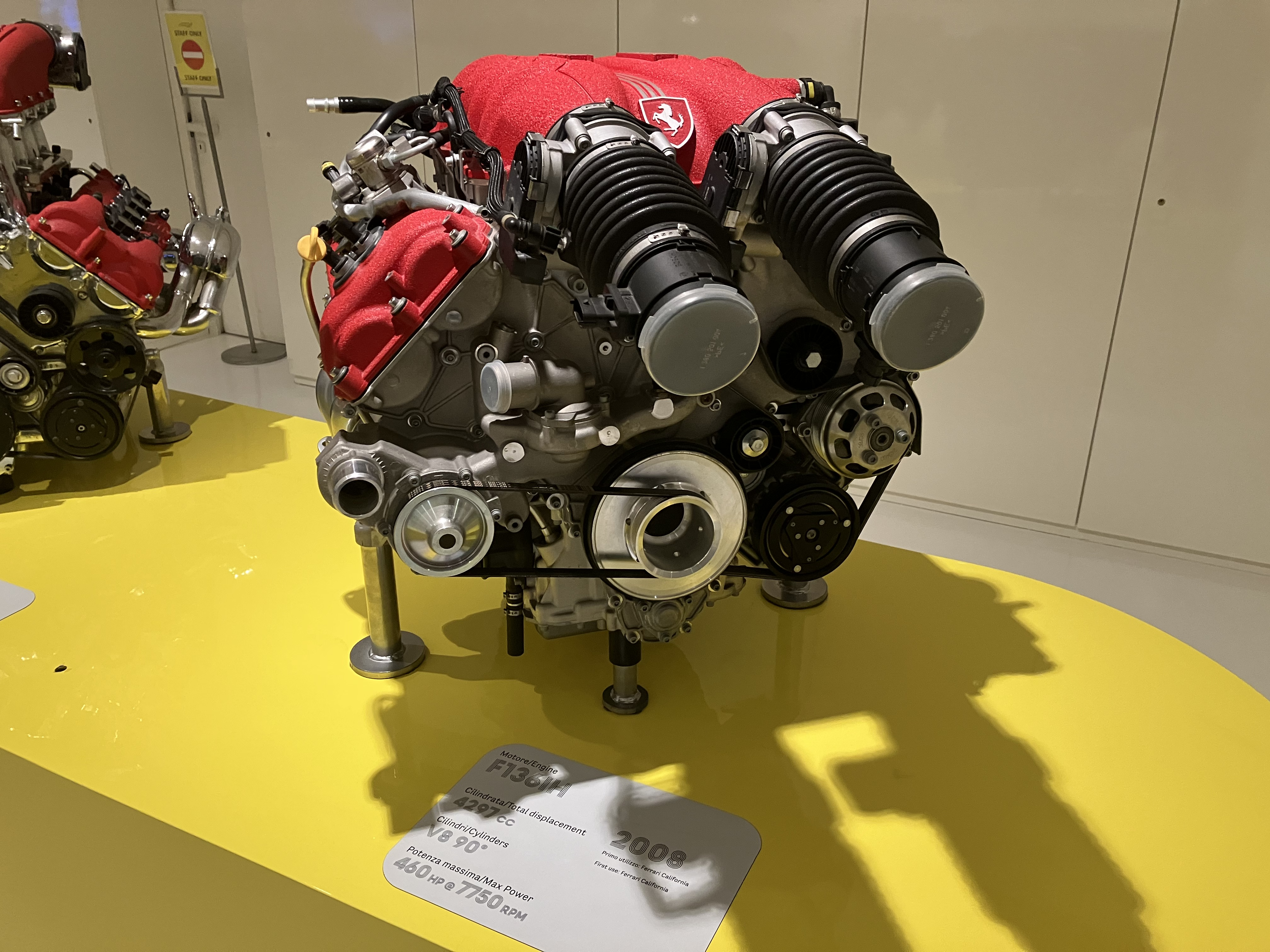
F136IH at the Museo Casa Enzo Ferrari (front)

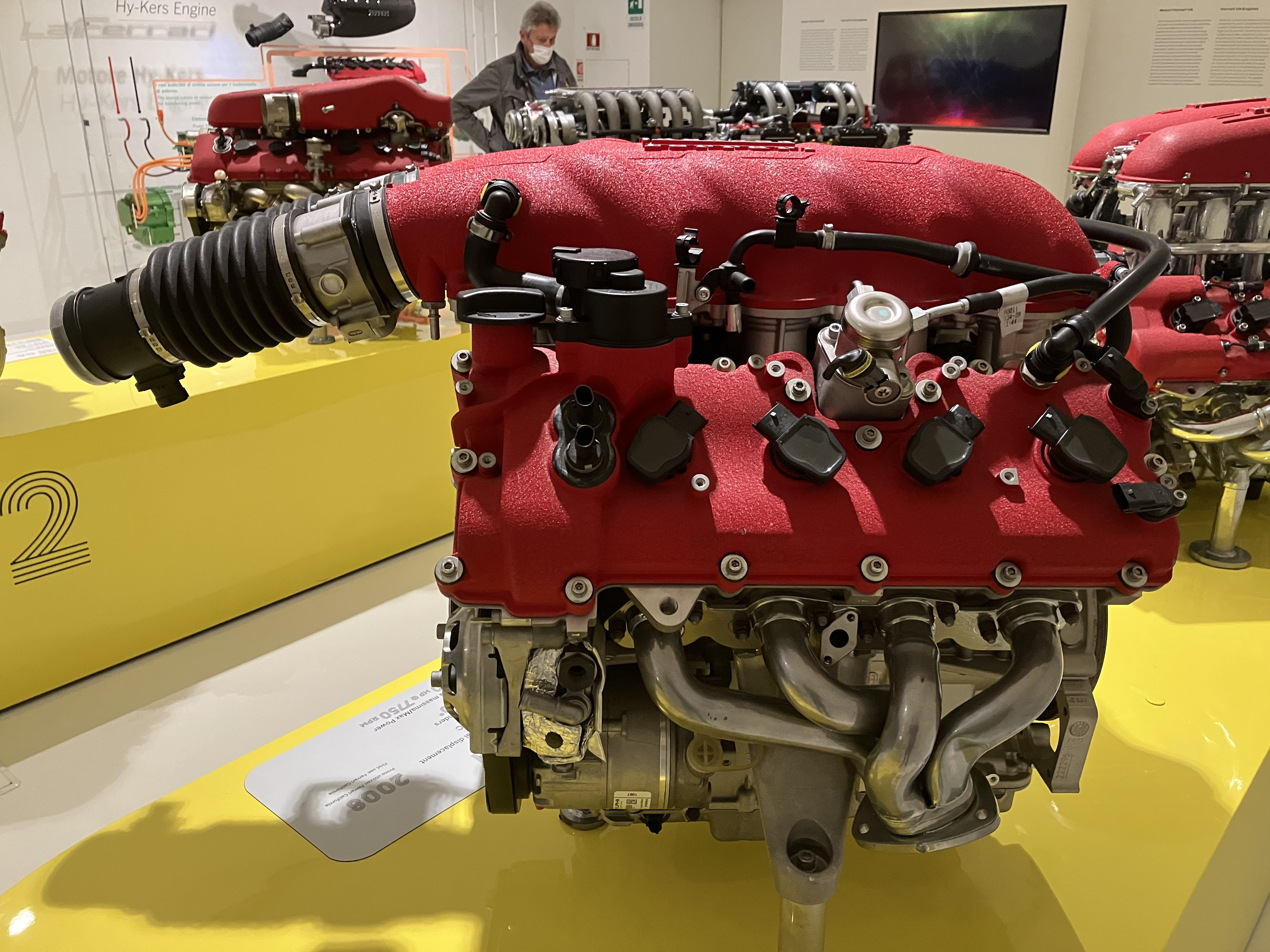
F136IH, right hand side

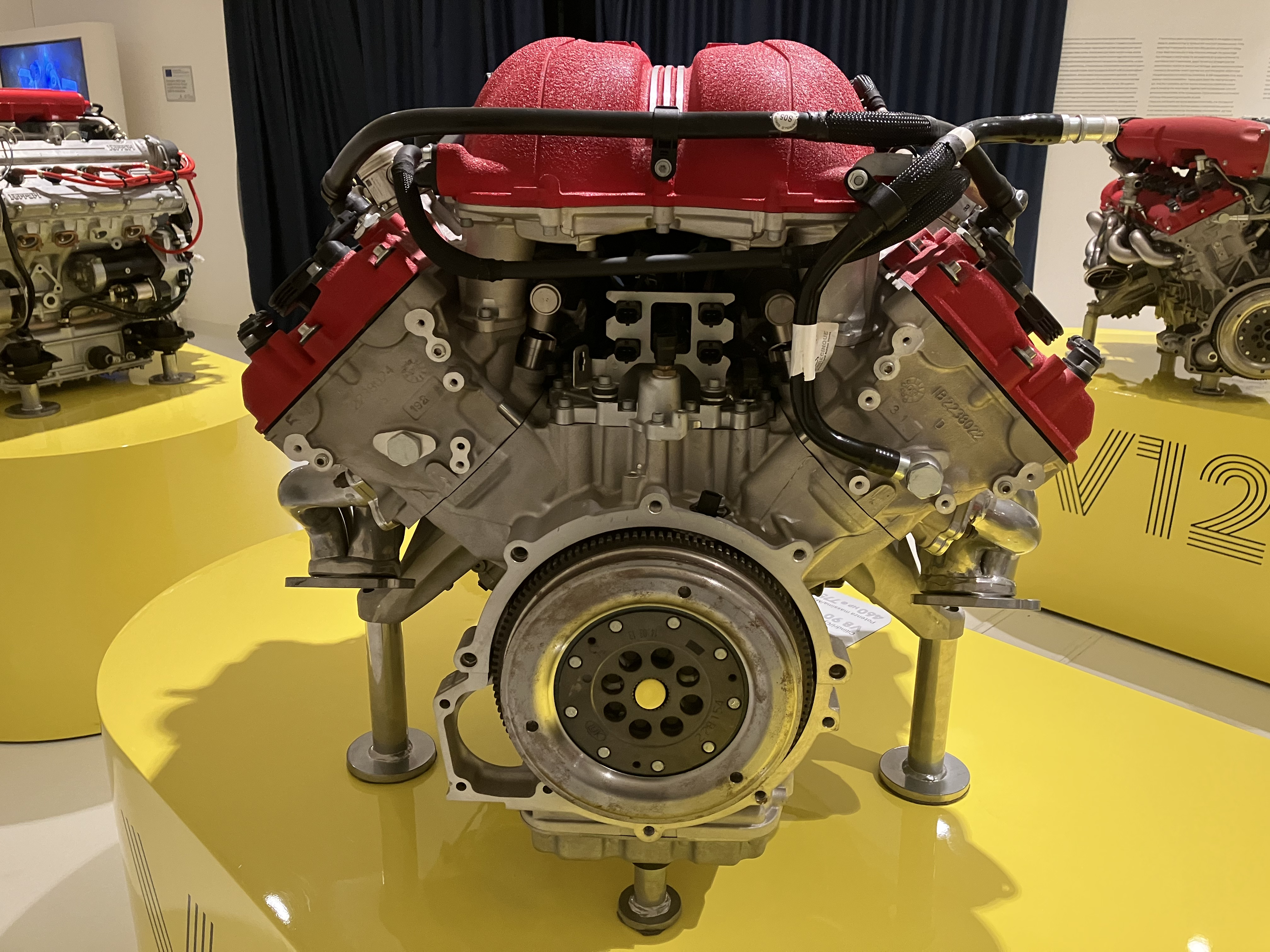
F136IH, rear

==== Racing engines ====
Engine	Displacement	Years	Model	Power	Notes
F136 E & EA	4,308 cc (263 cu in); 92 x 81 mm	2007–2010	Ferrari F430 Challenge	490 PS (360 kW; 483 hp)	
F136	4,308 cc (263 cu in)	2006–2008	Ferrari F430 GT3	558 PS (410 kW; 550 hp)	with restrictor plates
F136 GT	3,997 cc (244 cu in); 92 x 75.15 mm	2006–2010	Ferrari F430 GTC	445 PS (327 kW; 439 hp)	with restrictor plates
F136	4,497 cc (274 cu in); 94 x 81 mm	2011–2016	Ferrari 458 Italia GT2	465 PS (342 kW; 459 hp)	with restrictor plates
F136	4,497 cc (274 cu in)	2011–2016	Ferrari 458 Italia GT3	550 PS (405 kW; 542 hp)	with restrictor plates

=== Alfa Romeo ===
Engine	Displacement	Years	Model	Power	Torque	Notes
F136 YC	4,691 cc (286 cu in)	2007–2011	Alfa Romeo 8C Competizione; Alfa Romeo 8C Spider	450 PS (331 kW; 444 hp)	480 N⋅m (354 lb⋅ft) at 4750 rpm	wet sump

=== Outside Fiat Group ===
Engine	Displacement	Years	Model	Power	Notes
F136	4,244 cc (259 cu in)	2008	Gillet Vertigo.5 G2		race car
F136	4,244 cc (259 cu in)	2010–present	Gillet Vertigo.5 Spirit	420 PS (309 kW; 414 hp)	road car

==== A1GP usage ====
Engine	Displacement	Years	Model	Power	Notes
F136	4,500 cc (275 cu in)	2008–2009	A1GP "Powered by Ferrari"	600 PS (441 kW; 592 hp)	direct injection

== Awards ==
The F136 engine family has won a total of 8 awards in the International Engine of the Year competition. The F136 FB engine variant was awarded "Best Performance Engine" and "Above 4.0 litre" recognitions in 2011 and 2012, while the F136 FL variant won the same categories in 2014 and 2015.
