= 2015 4 Hours of Silverstone =

The Silverstone Circuit

The 2015 4 Hours of Silverstone was an endurance motor race held at the Silverstone Circuit near Silverstone, England on 10–11 April 2015, and served as the opening round of the 2015 European Le Mans Series, and the first race under the series' new four-hour format. The event shared the weekend at Silverstone with the FIA World Endurance Championship's six-hour event.

== Qualifying ==
=== Qualifying result ===
Class winners in bold.

Pos	Class	Team	Time	Grid
1	**LMP2**	**No. 41 Greaves Motorsport**	**1:48.752**	**1**
2	LMP2	No. 38 Jota Sport	1:49.212	2
3	LMP2	No. 46 Thiriet by TDS Racing	1:49.353	3
4	LMP2	No. 34 AF Corse	1:49.486	4
5	LMP2	No. 48 Murphy Prototypes	1:49.681	5
6	LMP2	No. 34 Eurasia Motorsport	1:50.216	6
7	LMP2	No. 29 Pegasus Racing	1:50.757	7
8	LMP2	No. 45 Ibañez Racing	1:51.418	8
9	LMP2	No. 32 AF Corse	1:52.020	9
10	LMP2	No. 44 Ibañez Racing	1:53.096	10
11	LMP2	No. 40 Krohn Racing	1:55.589	11
12	**LMP3**	**No. 3 Team LNT**	**1:59.892**	**12**
13	**LMGTE**	**No. 81 AF Corse**	**2:00.151**	**13**
14	LMGTE	No. 88 Proton Competition	2:00.269	14
15	LMP3	No. 2 Team LNT	2:00.457	15
16	LMGTE	No. 56 AT Racing	2:00.478	16
17	LMGTE	No. 52 BMW Sports Trophy Marc VDS	2:00.480	17
18	LMGTE	No. 86 Gulf Racing UK	2:00.641	18
19	LMGTE	No. 66 JMW Motorsport	2:00.997	19
20	LMGTE	No. 55 AF Corse	2:01.110	20
21	LMGTE	No. 51 AF Corse	2:01.336	21
22	LMGTE	No. 60 Formula Racing	2:01.437	22
23	**GTC**	**No. 59 TDS Racing**	**2:01.939**	**23**
24	LMP3	No. 11 Lanan Racing	2:02.045	24
25	LMP3	No. 7 University of Bolton	2:02.686	25
26	GTC	No. 63 AF Corse	2:03.002	26
27	GTC	No. 62 AF Corse	2:03.298	27
28	GTC	No. 64 AF Corse	2:03.564	28
29	GTC	No. 68 Massive Motorsport	2:04.096	29
30	GTC	No. 85 Gulf Racing UK	2:04.596	30
31	LMP3	No. 15 SVK by Speed Factory	2:06.697	31

== Race ==
=== Race result ===
Class winners in bold.

Pos	Class	No.	Team	Drivers	Chassis	Tyre	Laps
Pos	Class	No.	Team	Drivers	Engine	Tyre	Laps
1	**LMP2**	**41**	**(United Kingdom) Greaves Motorsport**	**(Switzerland) Gary Hirsch (United Kingdom) Jon Lancaster (Sweden) Björn Wirdheim**	**Gibson 015S**	D	**118**
1	**LMP2**	**41**	**(United Kingdom) Greaves Motorsport**	**(Switzerland) Gary Hirsch (United Kingdom) Jon Lancaster (Sweden) Björn Wirdheim**	**Nissan VK45DE 4.5 L V8**	D	**118**
2	LMP2	38	(United Kingdom) Jota Sport	(United Kingdom) Simon Dolan (Portugal) Filipe Albuquerque (United Kingdom) Harry Tincknell	Gibson 015S	D	118
2	LMP2	38	(United Kingdom) Jota Sport	(United Kingdom) Simon Dolan (Portugal) Filipe Albuquerque (United Kingdom) Harry Tincknell	Nissan VK45DE 4.5 L V8	D	118
3	LMP2	46	(France) Thiriet by TDS Racing	(France) Pierre Thiriet (France) Ludovic Badey (France) Tristan Gommendy	Oreca 05	D	118
3	LMP2	46	(France) Thiriet by TDS Racing	(France) Pierre Thiriet (France) Ludovic Badey (France) Tristan Gommendy	Nissan VK45DE 4.5 L V8	D	118
4	LMP2	40	(United States) Krohn Racing	(United States) Tracy Krohn (Sweden) Niclas Jönsson (Brazil) Oswaldo Negri Jr.	Ligier JS P2	M	117
4	LMP2	40	(United States) Krohn Racing	(United States) Tracy Krohn (Sweden) Niclas Jönsson (Brazil) Oswaldo Negri Jr.	Judd HK 3.6 L V8	M	117
5	LMP2	33	(Philippines) Eurasia Motorsport	(China) Pu Jun Jin (Netherlands) Nick de Bruijn	Oreca 03R	D	116
5	LMP2	33	(Philippines) Eurasia Motorsport	(China) Pu Jun Jin (Netherlands) Nick de Bruijn	Nissan VK45DE 4.5 L V8	D	116
6	LMP2	32	(Italy) AF Corse	(Italy) Maurizio Mediani (France) Nicolas Minassian (Russia) David Markozov	Oreca 03	M	114
6	LMP2	32	(Italy) AF Corse	(Italy) Maurizio Mediani (France) Nicolas Minassian (Russia) David Markozov	Nissan VK45DE 4.5 L V8	M	114
7	LMP2	45	(San Marino) Ibañez Racing	(France) José Ibañez (Italy) Ivan Bellarosa (France) Pierre Perret	Oreca 03R	D	114
7	LMP2	45	(San Marino) Ibañez Racing	(France) José Ibañez (Italy) Ivan Bellarosa (France) Pierre Perret	Nissan VK45DE 4.5 L V8	D	114
8	**LMGTE**	**86**	**(United Kingdom) Gulf Racing UK**	**(United Kingdom) Michael Wainwright (United Kingdom) Phil Keen (United Kingdom) Adam Carroll**	**Porsche 911 RSR**	D	**110**
8	**LMGTE**	**86**	**(United Kingdom) Gulf Racing UK**	**(United Kingdom) Michael Wainwright (United Kingdom) Phil Keen (United Kingdom) Adam Carroll**	**Porsche 4.0 L Flat-6**	D	**110**
9	LMGTE	66	(United Kingdom) JMW Motorsport	(United Kingdom) George Richardson (United Kingdom) Robert Smith (United Kingdom) Sam Tordoff	Ferrari 458 Italia GT2	D	109
9	LMGTE	66	(United Kingdom) JMW Motorsport	(United Kingdom) George Richardson (United Kingdom) Robert Smith (United Kingdom) Sam Tordoff	Ferrari 4.5 L V8	D	109
10	LMGTE	55	(Italy) AF Corse	(United Kingdom) Duncan Cameron (Republic of Ireland) Matt Griffin (United Kingdom) Aaron Scott	Ferrari 458 Italia GT2	D	109
10	LMGTE	55	(Italy) AF Corse	(United Kingdom) Duncan Cameron (Republic of Ireland) Matt Griffin (United Kingdom) Aaron Scott	Ferrari 4.5 L V8	D	109
11	LMGTE	52	(Belgium) BMW Team Marc VDS	(France) Henry Hassid (Finland) Jesse Krohn (United Kingdom) Andy Priaulx	BMW Z4 GTE	D	109
11	LMGTE	52	(Belgium) BMW Team Marc VDS	(France) Henry Hassid (Finland) Jesse Krohn (United Kingdom) Andy Priaulx	BMW 4.4 L V8	D	109
12	LMGTE	88	(Germany) Proton Competition	(Germany) Christian Ried (United Arab Emirates) Khaled Al Qubaisi (Austria) Klaus Bachler	Porsche 911 RSR	D	109
12	LMGTE	88	(Germany) Proton Competition	(Germany) Christian Ried (United Arab Emirates) Khaled Al Qubaisi (Austria) Klaus Bachler	Porsche 4.0 L Flat-6	D	109
13	LMGTE	60	(Denmark) Formula Racing	(Denmark) Johnny Laursen (Denmark) Mikkel Mac (Italy) Andrea Rizzoli	Ferrari 458 Italia GT2	D	109
13	LMGTE	60	(Denmark) Formula Racing	(Denmark) Johnny Laursen (Denmark) Mikkel Mac (Italy) Andrea Rizzoli	Ferrari 4.5 L V8	D	109
14	**GTC**	**59**	**(France) TDS Racing**	**(France) Eric Dermont (France) Dino Lunardi (France) Franck Perera**	**BMW Z4 GT3**	D	**108**
14	**GTC**	**59**	**(France) TDS Racing**	**(France) Eric Dermont (France) Dino Lunardi (France) Franck Perera**	**BMW 4.4 L V8**	D	**108**
15	LMGTE	56	(Austria) AT Racing	(Belarus) Alexander Talkanitsa Jr. (Belarus) Alexander Talkanitsa Sr. (Italy) Alessandro Pier Guidi	Ferrari 458 Italia GT2	D	107
15	LMGTE	56	(Austria) AT Racing	(Belarus) Alexander Talkanitsa Jr. (Belarus) Alexander Talkanitsa Sr. (Italy) Alessandro Pier Guidi	Ferrari 4.5 L V8	D	107
16	**LMP3**	**3**	**(United Kingdom) Team LNT**	**(United Kingdom) Chris Hoy (United Kingdom) Charlie Robertson**	**Ginetta-Juno LMP3**	M	**107**
16	**LMP3**	**3**	**(United Kingdom) Team LNT**	**(United Kingdom) Chris Hoy (United Kingdom) Charlie Robertson**	**Nissan VK50 5.0 L V8**	M	**107**
17	LMP3	2	(United Kingdom) Team LNT	(United Kingdom) Michael Simpson (France) Gaëtan Paletou	Ginetta-Juno LMP3	M	106
17	LMP3	2	(United Kingdom) Team LNT	(United Kingdom) Michael Simpson (France) Gaëtan Paletou	Nissan VK50 5.0 L V8	M	106
18	GTC	64	(Italy) AF Corse	(Denmark) Mads Rasmussen (Portugal) Francisco Guedes (Portugal) Filipe Barreiros	Ferrari 458 Italia GT3	D	106
18	GTC	64	(Italy) AF Corse	(Denmark) Mads Rasmussen (Portugal) Francisco Guedes (Portugal) Filipe Barreiros	Ferrari 4.5 L V8	D	106
19	LMP2	34	(Italy) AF Corse	(Russia) Mikhail Aleshin (Russia) Anton Ladygin (Russia) Kirill Ladygin	Oreca 03	M	105
19	LMP2	34	(Italy) AF Corse	(Russia) Mikhail Aleshin (Russia) Anton Ladygin (Russia) Kirill Ladygin	Nissan VK45DE 4.5 L V8	M	105
20	LMP3	7	(United Kingdom) University of Bolton	(United Kingdom) Rob Garofall (Germany) Jens Petersen	Ginetta-Juno LMP3	M	105
20	LMP3	7	(United Kingdom) University of Bolton	(United Kingdom) Rob Garofall (Germany) Jens Petersen	Nissan VK50 5.0 L V8	M	105
21	LMP3	15	(Spain) SVK by Speed Factory	(Latvia) Konstantīns Calko (Spain) Jésus Fuster (Lithuania) Dainius Matijošaitis	Ginetta-Juno LMP3	M	102
21	LMP3	15	(Spain) SVK by Speed Factory	(Latvia) Konstantīns Calko (Spain) Jésus Fuster (Lithuania) Dainius Matijošaitis	Nissan VK50 5.0 L V8	M	102
22	GTC	85	(United Kingdom) Gulf Racing UK	(United Kingdom) Daniel Brown (Germany) Roald Goethe (United Kingdom) Archie Hamilton	Lamborghini Gallardo LP560 GT3	D	92
22	GTC	85	(United Kingdom) Gulf Racing UK	(United Kingdom) Daniel Brown (Germany) Roald Goethe (United Kingdom) Archie Hamilton	Lamborghini 5.2 L V10	D	92
DNF	LMP2	44	(San Marino) Ibañez Racing	(Italy) Michele La Rosa (Japan) Yutaka Yamagishi	Oreca 03	D	99
DNF	LMP2	44	(San Marino) Ibañez Racing	(Italy) Michele La Rosa (Japan) Yutaka Yamagishi	Nissan VK45DE 4.5 L V8	D	99
DNF	LMP2	48	(Republic of Ireland) Murphy Prototypes	(United Kingdom) Michael Lyons (France) Nathanaël Berthon (United States) Mark Patterson	Oreca 03R	D	83
DNF	LMP2	48	(Republic of Ireland) Murphy Prototypes	(United Kingdom) Michael Lyons (France) Nathanaël Berthon (United States) Mark Patterson	Nissan VK45DE 4.5 L V8	D	83
DNF	GTC	63	(Italy) AF Corse	(Italy) Marco Cioci (Russia) Ilya Melnikov (Italy) Giorgio Roda	Ferrari 458 Italia GT3	D	67
DNF	GTC	63	(Italy) AF Corse	(Italy) Marco Cioci (Russia) Ilya Melnikov (Italy) Giorgio Roda	Ferrari 4.5 L V8	D	67
DNF	GTC	68	(Denmark) Massive Motorsport	(Denmark) Casper Elgaard (Denmark) Simon Møller (Denmark) Kristian Poulsen	Aston Martin V12 Vantage GT3	D	65
DNF	GTC	68	(Denmark) Massive Motorsport	(Denmark) Casper Elgaard (Denmark) Simon Møller (Denmark) Kristian Poulsen	Aston Martin 5.9 L V12	D	65
DNF	LMP2	29	(Germany) Pegasus Racing	(France) Léo Roussel (China) David Cheng (United Kingdom) Jonathan Coleman	Morgan LMP2	M	64
DNF	LMP2	29	(Germany) Pegasus Racing	(France) Léo Roussel (China) David Cheng (United Kingdom) Jonathan Coleman	Nissan VK45DE 4.5 L V8	M	64
DNF	LMP3	11	(United Kingdom) Lanan Racing	(United Kingdom) Alex Craven (United Kingdom) Joey Foster (United Kingdom) Charlie Hollings	Ginetta-Juno LMP3	M	52
DNF	LMP3	11	(United Kingdom) Lanan Racing	(United Kingdom) Alex Craven (United Kingdom) Joey Foster (United Kingdom) Charlie Hollings	Nissan VK50 5.0 L V8	M	52
DNF	LMGTE	51	(Italy) AF Corse	(Italy) Matteo Cressoni (Italy) Raffaele Giammaria (United States) Peter Mann	Ferrari 458 Italia GT2	D	35
DNF	LMGTE	51	(Italy) AF Corse	(Italy) Matteo Cressoni (Italy) Raffaele Giammaria (United States) Peter Mann	Ferrari 4.5 L V8	D	35
DNF	LMGTE	81	(Italy) AF Corse	(Italy) Michele Rugolo (Australia) Stephen Wyatt (Portugal) Rui Águas	Ferrari 458 Italia GT2	D	32
DNF	LMGTE	81	(Italy) AF Corse	(Italy) Michele Rugolo (Australia) Stephen Wyatt (Portugal) Rui Águas	Ferrari 4.5 L V8	D	32
DNS	GTC	62	(Italy) AF Corse	(Italy) Francesco Castellacci (Switzerland) Thomas Flohr (United Kingdom) Stuart Hall	Ferrari 458 Italia GT3	D	-
DNS	GTC	62	(Italy) AF Corse	(Italy) Francesco Castellacci (Switzerland) Thomas Flohr (United Kingdom) Stuart Hall	Ferrari 4.5 L V8	D	-

European Le Mans Series
Previous race: none	2015 season	Next race: Imola
