= 2015 4 Hours of Imola =

The Imola Circuit

The 2015 4 Hours of Imola was an endurance motor race held at the Imola Circuit in Imola, Emilia-Romagna, Italy on 16–17 May 2015. It was the second round of the 2015 European Le Mans Series.

== Race ==
=== Race result ===
Class winners in bold.

Pos	Class	No.	Team	Drivers	Chassis	Tyre	Laps
Pos	Class	No.	Team	Drivers	Engine	Tyre	Laps
1	**LMP2**	**46**	**(France) Thiriet by TDS Racing**	**(France) Pierre Thiriet** **(France) Ludovic Badey** **(France) Tristan Gommendy**	**Oreca 05**	D	**138**
1	**LMP2**	**46**	**(France) Thiriet by TDS Racing**	**(France) Pierre Thiriet** **(France) Ludovic Badey** **(France) Tristan Gommendy**	**Nissan VK45DE 4.5 L V8**	D	**138**
2	LMP2	48	(Republic of Ireland) Murphy Prototypes	(United Kingdom) Michael Lyons (France) Nathanaël Berthon (United States) Mark Patterson	Oreca 03R	D	138
2	LMP2	48	(Republic of Ireland) Murphy Prototypes	(United Kingdom) Michael Lyons (France) Nathanaël Berthon (United States) Mark Patterson	Nissan VK45DE 4.5 L V8	D	138
3	LMP2	38	(United Kingdom) Jota Sport	(United Kingdom) Simon Dolan (Portugal) Filipe Albuquerque (United Kingdom) Harry Tincknell	Gibson 015S	D	138
3	LMP2	38	(United Kingdom) Jota Sport	(United Kingdom) Simon Dolan (Portugal) Filipe Albuquerque (United Kingdom) Harry Tincknell	Nissan VK45DE 4.5 L V8	D	138
4	LMP2	41	(United Kingdom) Greaves Motorsport	(Switzerland) Gary Hirsch (United Kingdom) Jon Lancaster (Sweden) Björn Wirdheim	Gibson 015S	D	137
4	LMP2	41	(United Kingdom) Greaves Motorsport	(Switzerland) Gary Hirsch (United Kingdom) Jon Lancaster (Sweden) Björn Wirdheim	Nissan VK45DE 4.5 L V8	D	137
5	LMP2	40	(United States) Krohn Racing	(United States) Tracy Krohn (Sweden) Niclas Jönsson (Brazil) Oswaldo Negri, Jr.	Ligier JS P2	M	137
5	LMP2	40	(United States) Krohn Racing	(United States) Tracy Krohn (Sweden) Niclas Jönsson (Brazil) Oswaldo Negri, Jr.	Judd HK 3.6 L V8	M	137
6	LMP2	45	(San Marino) Ibañez Racing	(France) José Ibañez (Italy) Ivan Bellarosa	Oreca 03R	D	136
6	LMP2	45	(San Marino) Ibañez Racing	(France) José Ibañez (Italy) Ivan Bellarosa	Nissan VK45DE 4.5 L V8	D	136
7	LMP2	33	(Philippines) Eurasia Motorsport	(China) Pu Jun Jin (Netherlands) Nick de Bruijn	Oreca 03R	D	136
7	LMP2	33	(Philippines) Eurasia Motorsport	(China) Pu Jun Jin (Netherlands) Nick de Bruijn	Nissan VK45DE 4.5 L V8	D	136
8	LMP2	37	(Russia) SMP Racing	(Russia) Mikhail Aleshin (Russia) Anton Ladygin (Russia) Kirill Ladygin	BR Engineering BR01	M	132
8	LMP2	37	(Russia) SMP Racing	(Russia) Mikhail Aleshin (Russia) Anton Ladygin (Russia) Kirill Ladygin	Nissan VK45DE 4.5 L V8	M	132
9	**LMGTE**	**56**	**(Austria) AT Racing**	**(Belarus) Alexander Talkanitsa, Jr.** **(Belarus) Alexander Talkanitsa, Sr.** **(Italy) Alessandro Pier Guidi**	**Ferrari 458 Italia GT2**	D	**132**
9	**LMGTE**	**56**	**(Austria) AT Racing**	**(Belarus) Alexander Talkanitsa, Jr.** **(Belarus) Alexander Talkanitsa, Sr.** **(Italy) Alessandro Pier Guidi**	**Ferrari 4.5 L V8**	D	**132**
10	LMGTE	88	(Germany) Proton Competition	(Germany) Christian Ried (Austria) Richard Lietz (Italy) Marco Mapelli	Porsche 911 RSR	D	132
10	LMGTE	88	(Germany) Proton Competition	(Germany) Christian Ried (Austria) Richard Lietz (Italy) Marco Mapelli	Porsche 4.0 L Flat-6	D	132
11	LMGTE	60	(Denmark) Formula Racing	(Denmark) Johnny Laursen (Denmark) Mikkel Mac (Italy) Andrea Rizzoli	Ferrari 458 Italia GT2	D	132
11	LMGTE	60	(Denmark) Formula Racing	(Denmark) Johnny Laursen (Denmark) Mikkel Mac (Italy) Andrea Rizzoli	Ferrari 4.5 L V8	D	132
12	LMGTE	52	(Belgium) BMW Team Marc VDS	(France) Henry Hassid (Finland) Jesse Krohn (United Kingdom) Andy Priaulx	BMW Z4 GTE	D	132
12	LMGTE	52	(Belgium) BMW Team Marc VDS	(France) Henry Hassid (Finland) Jesse Krohn (United Kingdom) Andy Priaulx	BMW 4.4 L V8	D	132
13	LMGTE	55	(Italy) AF Corse	(United Kingdom) Duncan Cameron (Republic of Ireland) Matt Griffin (United Kingdom) Aaron Scott	Ferrari 458 Italia GT2	D	132
13	LMGTE	55	(Italy) AF Corse	(United Kingdom) Duncan Cameron (Republic of Ireland) Matt Griffin (United Kingdom) Aaron Scott	Ferrari 4.5 L V8	D	132
14	LMGTE	66	(United Kingdom) JMW Motorsport	(United Kingdom) George Richardson (United Kingdom) Robert Smith (United Kingdom) Sam Tordoff	Ferrari 458 Italia GT2	D	130
14	LMGTE	66	(United Kingdom) JMW Motorsport	(United Kingdom) George Richardson (United Kingdom) Robert Smith (United Kingdom) Sam Tordoff	Ferrari 4.5 L V8	D	130
15	LMGTE	51	(Italy) AF Corse	(Italy) Matteo Cressoni (Italy) Raffaele Giammaria (United States) Peter Mann	Ferrari 458 Italia GT2	D	130
15	LMGTE	51	(Italy) AF Corse	(Italy) Matteo Cressoni (Italy) Raffaele Giammaria (United States) Peter Mann	Ferrari 4.5 L V8	D	130
16	**GTC**	**62**	**(Italy) AF Corse**	**(Italy) Francesco Castellacci** **(Italy) Rino Mastronardi** **(United Kingdom) Stuart Hall**	**Ferrari 458 Italia GT3**	D	**129**
16	**GTC**	**62**	**(Italy) AF Corse**	**(Italy) Francesco Castellacci** **(Italy) Rino Mastronardi** **(United Kingdom) Stuart Hall**	**Ferrari 4.5 L V8**	D	**129**
17	LMP2	29	(Germany) Pegasus Racing	(France) Léo Roussel (China) David Cheng (France) Julien Schell	Morgan LMP2	M	129
17	LMP2	29	(Germany) Pegasus Racing	(France) Léo Roussel (China) David Cheng (France) Julien Schell	Nissan VK45DE 4.5 L V8	M	129
18	GTC	63	(Italy) AF Corse	(Italy) Marco Cioci (Russia) Ilya Melnikov (Italy) Giorgio Roda	Ferrari 458 Italia GT3	D	128
18	GTC	63	(Italy) AF Corse	(Italy) Marco Cioci (Russia) Ilya Melnikov (Italy) Giorgio Roda	Ferrari 4.5 L V8	D	128
19	GTC	64	(Italy) AF Corse	(Denmark) Mads Rasmussen (Portugal) Francisco Guedes (Portugal) Filipe Barreiros	Ferrari 458 Italia GT3	D	127
19	GTC	64	(Italy) AF Corse	(Denmark) Mads Rasmussen (Portugal) Francisco Guedes (Portugal) Filipe Barreiros	Ferrari 4.5 L V8	D	127
20	**LMP3**	**7**	**(United Kingdom) University of Bolton**	**(United Kingdom) Rob Garofall** **(Denmark) Morten Dons**	**Ginetta-Juno LMP3**	M	**126**
20	**LMP3**	**7**	**(United Kingdom) University of Bolton**	**(United Kingdom) Rob Garofall** **(Denmark) Morten Dons**	**Nissan VK50 5.0 L V8**	M	**126**
21	LMP3	15	(Spain) SVK by Speed Factory	(Latvia) Konstantīns Calko (Spain) Jésus Fuster (Lithuania) Dainius Matijošaitis	Ginetta-Juno LMP3	M	124
21	LMP3	15	(Spain) SVK by Speed Factory	(Latvia) Konstantīns Calko (Spain) Jésus Fuster (Lithuania) Dainius Matijošaitis	Nissan VK50 5.0 L V8	M	124
22	LMGTE	86	(United Kingdom) Gulf Racing UK	(United Kingdom) Michael Wainwright (United Kingdom) Phil Keen (United Kingdom) Adam Carroll	Porsche 911 RSR	D	124
22	LMGTE	86	(United Kingdom) Gulf Racing UK	(United Kingdom) Michael Wainwright (United Kingdom) Phil Keen (United Kingdom) Adam Carroll	Porsche 4.0 L Flat-6	D	124
23	LMP3	11	(United Kingdom) Lanan Racing	(United Kingdom) Alex Craven (Russia) Mark Shulzhitskiy	Ginetta-Juno LMP3	M	121
23	LMP3	11	(United Kingdom) Lanan Racing	(United Kingdom) Alex Craven (Russia) Mark Shulzhitskiy	Nissan VK50 5.0 L V8	M	121
24	GTC	59	(France) TDS Racing	(France) Eric Dermont (France) Dino Lunardi (France) Franck Perera	BMW Z4 GT3	D	106
24	GTC	59	(France) TDS Racing	(France) Eric Dermont (France) Dino Lunardi (France) Franck Perera	BMW 4.4 L V8	D	106
DNF	LMP3	3	(United Kingdom) Team LNT	(United Kingdom) Chris Hoy (United Kingdom) Charlie Robertson	Ginetta-Juno LMP3	M	108
DNF	LMP3	3	(United Kingdom) Team LNT	(United Kingdom) Chris Hoy (United Kingdom) Charlie Robertson	Nissan VK50 5.0 L V8	M	108
DNF	GTC	68	(Denmark) Massive Motorsport	(Denmark) Casper Elgaard (Denmark) Simon Møller (Denmark) Kristian Poulsen	Aston Martin V12 Vantage GT3	D	84
DNF	GTC	68	(Denmark) Massive Motorsport	(Denmark) Casper Elgaard (Denmark) Simon Møller (Denmark) Kristian Poulsen	Aston Martin 5.9 L V12	D	84
DNF	LMP2	27	(Russia) SMP Racing	(Italy) Maurizio Mediani (France) Nicolas Minassian (Russia) David Markozov	BR Engineering BR01	M	81
DNF	LMP2	27	(Russia) SMP Racing	(Italy) Maurizio Mediani (France) Nicolas Minassian (Russia) David Markozov	Nissan VK45DE 4.5 L V8	M	81
DNF	LMP3	5	(Italy) Villorba Corse	(Italy) Roberto Lacorte (Italy) Giorgio Sernagiotto	Ginetta-Juno LMP3	M	54
DNF	LMP3	5	(Italy) Villorba Corse	(Italy) Roberto Lacorte (Italy) Giorgio Sernagiotto	Nissan VK50 5.0 L V8	M	54
DNF	LMP3	2	(United Kingdom) Team LNT	(United Kingdom) Michael Simpson (France) Gaëtan Paletou	Ginetta-Juno LMP3	M	26
DNF	LMP3	2	(United Kingdom) Team LNT	(United Kingdom) Michael Simpson (France) Gaëtan Paletou	Nissan VK50 5.0 L V8	M	26
DNS	LMP2	44	(San Marino) Ibañez Racing	(France) Pierre Perret (Japan) Yutaka Yamagishi	Oreca 03	D	0
DNS	LMP2	44	(San Marino) Ibañez Racing	(France) Pierre Perret (Japan) Yutaka Yamagishi	Nissan VK45DE 4.5 L V8	D	0

European Le Mans Series
Previous race: Silverstone	2015 season	Next race: Red Bull Ring
