= 2015 4 Hours of Le Castellet =

The Circuit Paul Ricard

The 2015 4 Hours of Le Castellet was an endurance motor race held at Circuit Paul Ricard in Le Castellet, France on 5–6 September 2015. It was the fourth round of the 2015 European Le Mans Series.

== Race ==
=== Race result ===
Class winners in bold.

Pos	Class	No.	Team	Drivers	Chassis	Tyre	Laps
Pos	Class	No.	Team	Drivers	Engine	Tyre	Laps
1	**LMP2**	**41**	**(United Kingdom) Greaves Motorsport**	**(Switzerland) Gary Hirsch** **(United Kingdom) Jon Lancaster** **(Sweden) Björn Wirdheim**	**Gibson 015S**	D	**123**
1	**LMP2**	**41**	**(United Kingdom) Greaves Motorsport**	**(Switzerland) Gary Hirsch** **(United Kingdom) Jon Lancaster** **(Sweden) Björn Wirdheim**	**Nissan VK45DE 4.5 L V8**	D	**123**
2	LMP2	21	(Russia) AF Racing	(Russia) Mikhail Aleshin (Russia) Viktor Shaytar (Russia) Kirill Ladygin	BR Engineering BR01	D	123
2	LMP2	21	(Russia) AF Racing	(Russia) Mikhail Aleshin (Russia) Viktor Shaytar (Russia) Kirill Ladygin	Nissan VK45DE 4.5 L V8	D	123
3	LMP2	38	(United Kingdom) Jota Sport	(United Kingdom) Simon Dolan (Portugal) Filipe Albuquerque (United Kingdom) Harry Tincknell	Gibson 015S	D	123
3	LMP2	38	(United Kingdom) Jota Sport	(United Kingdom) Simon Dolan (Portugal) Filipe Albuquerque (United Kingdom) Harry Tincknell	Nissan VK45DE 4.5 L V8	D	123
4	LMP2	20	(Russia) AF Racing	(Italy) Maurizio Mediani (France) Nicolas Minassian (Russia) David Markozov	BR Engineering BR01	D	123
4	LMP2	20	(Russia) AF Racing	(Italy) Maurizio Mediani (France) Nicolas Minassian (Russia) David Markozov	Nissan VK45DE 4.5 L V8	D	123
5	LMP2	40	(United States) Krohn Racing	(United States) Tracy Krohn (Sweden) Niclas Jönsson (France) Olivier Pla	Ligier JS P2	MI	122
5	LMP2	40	(United States) Krohn Racing	(United States) Tracy Krohn (Sweden) Niclas Jönsson (France) Olivier Pla	Judd HK 3.6 L V8	MI	122
6	LMP2	46	(France) Thiriet by TDS Racing	(France) Pierre Thiriet (France) Ludovic Badey (France) Tristan Gommendy	Oreca 05	D	122
6	LMP2	46	(France) Thiriet by TDS Racing	(France) Pierre Thiriet (France) Ludovic Badey (France) Tristan Gommendy	Nissan VK45DE 4.5 L V8	D	122
7	LMP2	29	(Germany) Pegasus Racing	(France) Léo Roussel (China) David Cheng	Morgan LMP2	MI	121
7	LMP2	29	(Germany) Pegasus Racing	(France) Léo Roussel (China) David Cheng	Nissan VK45DE 4.5 L V8	MI	121
8	LMP2	25	(Portugal) Algarve Pro Racing	(United Kingdom) Michael Munemann (Italy) Andrea Roda (United Kingdom) James Winslow	Ligier JS P2	D	121
8	LMP2	25	(Portugal) Algarve Pro Racing	(United Kingdom) Michael Munemann (Italy) Andrea Roda (United Kingdom) James Winslow	Nissan VK45DE 4.5 L V8	D	121
9	**LMGTE**	**60**	**(Denmark) Formula Racing**	**(Denmark) Johnny Laursen** **(Denmark) Mikkel Mac** **(Italy) Andrea Rizzoli**	**Ferrari 458 Italia GT2**	D	**117**
9	**LMGTE**	**60**	**(Denmark) Formula Racing**	**(Denmark) Johnny Laursen** **(Denmark) Mikkel Mac** **(Italy) Andrea Rizzoli**	**Ferrari 4.5 L V8**	D	**117**
10	LMGTE	52	(Belgium) BMW Team Marc VDS	(France) Henry Hassid (Finland) Jesse Krohn (United Kingdom) Andy Priaulx	BMW Z4 GTE	D	116
10	LMGTE	52	(Belgium) BMW Team Marc VDS	(France) Henry Hassid (Finland) Jesse Krohn (United Kingdom) Andy Priaulx	BMW 4.4 L V8	D	116
11	LMGTE	66	(United Kingdom) JMW Motorsport	(United Kingdom) Rory Butcher (United Kingdom) Robert Smith (United Kingdom) Jonny Cocker	Ferrari 458 Italia GT2	D	115
11	LMGTE	66	(United Kingdom) JMW Motorsport	(United Kingdom) Rory Butcher (United Kingdom) Robert Smith (United Kingdom) Jonny Cocker	Ferrari 4.5 L V8	D	115
12	LMGTE	88	(Germany) Proton Competition	(Germany) Christian Ried (Austria) Richard Lietz (Italy) Marco Mapelli	Porsche 911 RSR	D	115
12	LMGTE	88	(Germany) Proton Competition	(Germany) Christian Ried (Austria) Richard Lietz (Italy) Marco Mapelli	Porsche 4.0 L Flat-6	D	115
13	LMGTE	56	(Austria) AT Racing	(Belarus) Alexander Talkanitsa, Jr. (Belarus) Alexander Talkanitsa, Sr. (Italy) Alessandro Pier Guidi	Ferrari 458 Italia GT2	D	115
13	LMGTE	56	(Austria) AT Racing	(Belarus) Alexander Talkanitsa, Jr. (Belarus) Alexander Talkanitsa, Sr. (Italy) Alessandro Pier Guidi	Ferrari 4.5 L V8	D	115
14	LMGTE	55	(Italy) AF Corse	(United Kingdom) Duncan Cameron (Republic of Ireland) Matt Griffin (United Kingdom) Aaron Scott	Ferrari 458 Italia GT2	D	115
14	LMGTE	55	(Italy) AF Corse	(United Kingdom) Duncan Cameron (Republic of Ireland) Matt Griffin (United Kingdom) Aaron Scott	Ferrari 4.5 L V8	D	115
15	LMGTE	86	(United Kingdom) Gulf Racing UK	(United Kingdom) Michael Wainwright (United Kingdom) Phil Keen (United Kingdom) Adam Carroll	Porsche 911 RSR	D	115
15	LMGTE	86	(United Kingdom) Gulf Racing UK	(United Kingdom) Michael Wainwright (United Kingdom) Phil Keen (United Kingdom) Adam Carroll	Porsche 4.0 L Flat-6	D	115
16	**GTC**	**59**	**(France) TDS Racing**	**(France) Eric Dermont** **(France) Dino Lunardi** **(France) Franck Perera**	**BMW Z4 GT3**	D	**113**
16	**GTC**	**59**	**(France) TDS Racing**	**(France) Eric Dermont** **(France) Dino Lunardi** **(France) Franck Perera**	**BMW 4.4 L V8**	D	**113**
17	**LMP3**	**3**	**(United Kingdom) Team LNT**	**(United Kingdom) Chris Hoy** **(United Kingdom) Charlie Robertson**	**Ginetta-Juno LMP3**	MI	**113**
17	**LMP3**	**3**	**(United Kingdom) Team LNT**	**(United Kingdom) Chris Hoy** **(United Kingdom) Charlie Robertson**	**Nissan VK50 5.0 L V8**	MI	**113**
18	GTC	62	(Italy) AF Corse	(Italy) Francesco Castellacci (Switzerland) Thomas Flohr (United Kingdom) Stuart Hall	Ferrari 458 Italia GT3	D	113
18	GTC	62	(Italy) AF Corse	(Italy) Francesco Castellacci (Switzerland) Thomas Flohr (United Kingdom) Stuart Hall	Ferrari 4.5 L V8	D	113
19	LMP3	5	(Italy) Villorba Corse	(Italy) Roberto Lacorte (Italy) Giorgio Sernagiotto	Ginetta-Juno LMP3	MI	113
19	LMP3	5	(Italy) Villorba Corse	(Italy) Roberto Lacorte (Italy) Giorgio Sernagiotto	Nissan VK50 5.0 L V8	MI	113
20	GTC	68	(Denmark) Massive Motorsport	(Denmark) Casper Elgaard (Denmark) Simon Møller (Denmark) Kristian Poulsen	Aston Martin V12 Vantage GT3	D	112
20	GTC	68	(Denmark) Massive Motorsport	(Denmark) Casper Elgaard (Denmark) Simon Møller (Denmark) Kristian Poulsen	Aston Martin 5.9 L V12	D	112
21	GTC	64	(Italy) AF Corse	(Denmark) Mads Rasmussen (Portugal) Francisco Guedes (Belgium) Adrien De Leener	Ferrari 458 Italia GT3	D	112
21	GTC	64	(Italy) AF Corse	(Denmark) Mads Rasmussen (Portugal) Francisco Guedes (Belgium) Adrien De Leener	Ferrari 4.5 L V8	D	112
22	LMP3	15	(Spain) SVK by Speed Factory	(Latvia) Konstantīns Calko (Netherlands) Mirco van Oostrum (Lithuania) Dainius Matijošaitis	Ginetta-Juno LMP3	MI	112
22	LMP3	15	(Spain) SVK by Speed Factory	(Latvia) Konstantīns Calko (Netherlands) Mirco van Oostrum (Lithuania) Dainius Matijošaitis	Nissan VK50 5.0 L V8	MI	112
DNF	LMP2	33	(Philippines) Eurasia Motorsport	(United Kingdom) Richard Bradley (Netherlands) Nick de Bruijn	Oreca 03R	D	114
DNF	LMP2	33	(Philippines) Eurasia Motorsport	(United Kingdom) Richard Bradley (Netherlands) Nick de Bruijn	Nissan VK45DE 4.5 L V8	D	114
DNF	LMGTE	51	(Italy) AF Corse	(Italy) Matteo Cressoni (Italy) Andrea Bertolini (United States) Peter Mann	Ferrari 458 Italia GT2	D	100
DNF	LMGTE	51	(Italy) AF Corse	(Italy) Matteo Cressoni (Italy) Andrea Bertolini (United States) Peter Mann	Ferrari 4.5 L V8	D	100
DNF	LMP2	48	(Republic of Ireland) Murphy Prototypes	(United Kingdom) Michael Lyons (France) Nathanaël Berthon (United States) Mark Patterson	Oreca 03R	D	61
DNF	LMP2	48	(Republic of Ireland) Murphy Prototypes	(United Kingdom) Michael Lyons (France) Nathanaël Berthon (United States) Mark Patterson	Nissan VK45DE 4.5 L V8	D	61
DNF	GTC	63	(Italy) AF Corse	(Italy) Marco Cioci (Russia) Ilya Melnikov (Italy) Giorgio Roda	Ferrari 458 Italia GT3	D	61
DNF	GTC	63	(Italy) AF Corse	(Italy) Marco Cioci (Russia) Ilya Melnikov (Italy) Giorgio Roda	Ferrari 4.5 L V8	D	61
DNF	LMP3	2	(United Kingdom) Team LNT	(United Kingdom) Michael Simpson (France) Gaëtan Paletou	Ginetta-Juno LMP3	MI	32
DNF	LMP3	2	(United Kingdom) Team LNT	(United Kingdom) Michael Simpson (France) Gaëtan Paletou	Nissan VK50 5.0 L V8	MI	32

European Le Mans Series
Previous race: Red Bull Ring	2015 season	Next race: Estoril
