= 2015 4 Hours of Red Bull Ring =

The Red Bull Ring

The 2015 4 Hours of Red Bull Ring was an endurance motor race held at the Red Bull Ring in Spielberg, Styria, Austria on 11–12 July 2015. It was the third round of the 2015 European Le Mans Series.

== Race ==
=== Race result ===
Class winners in bold.

Pos	Class	No.	Team	Drivers	Chassis	Tyre	Laps
Pos	Class	No.	Team	Drivers	Engine	Tyre	Laps
1	**LMP2**	**38**	**(United Kingdom) Jota Sport**	**(United Kingdom) Simon Dolan** **(Portugal) Filipe Albuquerque** **(United Kingdom) Harry Tincknell**	**Gibson 015S**	D	**151**
1	**LMP2**	**38**	**(United Kingdom) Jota Sport**	**(United Kingdom) Simon Dolan** **(Portugal) Filipe Albuquerque** **(United Kingdom) Harry Tincknell**	**Nissan VK45DE 4.5 L V8**	D	**151**
2	LMP2	46	(France) Thiriet by TDS Racing	(France) Pierre Thiriet (France) Ludovic Badey (France) Tristan Gommendy	Oreca 05	D	151
2	LMP2	46	(France) Thiriet by TDS Racing	(France) Pierre Thiriet (France) Ludovic Badey (France) Tristan Gommendy	Nissan VK45DE 4.5 L V8	D	151
3	LMP2	37	(Russia) SMP Racing	(Russia) Mikhail Aleshin (Russia) Anton Ladygin (Russia) Kirill Ladygin	BR Engineering BR01	MI	150
3	LMP2	37	(Russia) SMP Racing	(Russia) Mikhail Aleshin (Russia) Anton Ladygin (Russia) Kirill Ladygin	Nissan VK45DE 4.5 L V8	MI	150
4	LMP2	41	(United Kingdom) Greaves Motorsport	(Switzerland) Gary Hirsch (United Kingdom) Jon Lancaster (Sweden) Björn Wirdheim	Gibson 015S	D	150
4	LMP2	41	(United Kingdom) Greaves Motorsport	(Switzerland) Gary Hirsch (United Kingdom) Jon Lancaster (Sweden) Björn Wirdheim	Nissan VK45DE 4.5 L V8	D	150
5	LMP2	40	(United States) Krohn Racing	(United States) Tracy Krohn (Sweden) Niclas Jönsson (France) Julien Canal	Ligier JS P2	MI	150
5	LMP2	40	(United States) Krohn Racing	(United States) Tracy Krohn (Sweden) Niclas Jönsson (France) Julien Canal	Judd HK 3.6 L V8	MI	150
6	LMP2	48	(Republic of Ireland) Murphy Prototypes	(United Kingdom) Michael Lyons (France) Nathanaël Berthon (United States) Mark Patterson	Oreca 03R	D	150
6	LMP2	48	(Republic of Ireland) Murphy Prototypes	(United Kingdom) Michael Lyons (France) Nathanaël Berthon (United States) Mark Patterson	Nissan VK45DE 4.5 L V8	D	150
7	LMP2	29	(Germany) Pegasus Racing	(France) Léo Roussel (China) David Cheng (France) Julien Schell	Morgan LMP2	MI	149
7	LMP2	29	(Germany) Pegasus Racing	(France) Léo Roussel (China) David Cheng (France) Julien Schell	Nissan VK45DE 4.5 L V8	MI	149
8	LMP2	33	(Philippines) Eurasia Motorsport	(China) Pu Jun Jin (Netherlands) Nick de Bruijn	Oreca 03R	D	149
8	LMP2	33	(Philippines) Eurasia Motorsport	(China) Pu Jun Jin (Netherlands) Nick de Bruijn	Nissan VK45DE 4.5 L V8	D	149
9	LMP2	45	(San Marino) Ibañez Racing	(France) José Ibañez (Italy) Ivan Bellarosa	Oreca 03R	D	149
9	LMP2	45	(San Marino) Ibañez Racing	(France) José Ibañez (Italy) Ivan Bellarosa	Nissan VK45DE 4.5 L V8	D	149
10	**LMGTE**	**60**	**(Denmark) Formula Racing**	**(Denmark) Johnny Laursen** **(Denmark) Mikkel Mac** **(Italy) Andrea Rizzoli**	**Ferrari 458 Italia GT2**	D	**144**
10	**LMGTE**	**60**	**(Denmark) Formula Racing**	**(Denmark) Johnny Laursen** **(Denmark) Mikkel Mac** **(Italy) Andrea Rizzoli**	**Ferrari 4.5 L V8**	D	**144**
11	LMGTE	55	(Italy) AF Corse	(United Kingdom) Duncan Cameron (Republic of Ireland) Matt Griffin (United Kingdom) Aaron Scott	Ferrari 458 Italia GT2	D	144
11	LMGTE	55	(Italy) AF Corse	(United Kingdom) Duncan Cameron (Republic of Ireland) Matt Griffin (United Kingdom) Aaron Scott	Ferrari 4.5 L V8	D	144
12	LMGTE	51	(Italy) AF Corse	(Italy) Matteo Cressoni (Italy) Raffaele Giammaria (United States) Peter Mann	Ferrari 458 Italia GT2	D	144
12	LMGTE	51	(Italy) AF Corse	(Italy) Matteo Cressoni (Italy) Raffaele Giammaria (United States) Peter Mann	Ferrari 4.5 L V8	D	144
13	LMGTE	52	(Belgium) BMW Team Marc VDS	(France) Henry Hassid (Finland) Jesse Krohn (United Kingdom) Andy Priaulx	BMW Z4 GTE	D	144
13	LMGTE	52	(Belgium) BMW Team Marc VDS	(France) Henry Hassid (Finland) Jesse Krohn (United Kingdom) Andy Priaulx	BMW 4.4 L V8	D	144
14	LMGTE	88	(Germany) Proton Competition	(Germany) Christian Ried (Austria) Richard Lietz (Germany) Sebastian Asch	Porsche 911 RSR	D	143
14	LMGTE	88	(Germany) Proton Competition	(Germany) Christian Ried (Austria) Richard Lietz (Germany) Sebastian Asch	Porsche 4.0 L Flat-6	D	143
15	LMP2	25	(Portugal) Algarve Pro Racing	(United Kingdom) Michael Munemann (Italy) Andrea Roda (United Kingdom) James Winslow	Ligier JS P2	D	143
15	LMP2	25	(Portugal) Algarve Pro Racing	(United Kingdom) Michael Munemann (Italy) Andrea Roda (United Kingdom) James Winslow	Nissan VK45DE 4.5 L V8	D	143
16	LMGTE	66	(United Kingdom) JMW Motorsport	(United Kingdom) George Richardson (United Kingdom) Robert Smith (United Kingdom) Sam Tordoff	Ferrari 458 Italia GT2	D	143
16	LMGTE	66	(United Kingdom) JMW Motorsport	(United Kingdom) George Richardson (United Kingdom) Robert Smith (United Kingdom) Sam Tordoff	Ferrari 4.5 L V8	D	143
17	LMGTE	86	(United Kingdom) Gulf Racing UK	(United Kingdom) Michael Wainwright (United Kingdom) Daniel Brown (United Kingdom) Adam Carroll	Porsche 911 RSR	D	142
17	LMGTE	86	(United Kingdom) Gulf Racing UK	(United Kingdom) Michael Wainwright (United Kingdom) Daniel Brown (United Kingdom) Adam Carroll	Porsche 4.0 L Flat-6	D	142
18	**GTC**	**62**	**(Italy) AF Corse**	**(Italy) Francesco Castellacci** **(Switzerland) Thomas Flohr** **(United Kingdom) Stuart Hall**	**Ferrari 458 Italia GT3**	D	**141**
18	**GTC**	**62**	**(Italy) AF Corse**	**(Italy) Francesco Castellacci** **(Switzerland) Thomas Flohr** **(United Kingdom) Stuart Hall**	**Ferrari 4.5 L V8**	D	**141**
19	**LMP3**	**3**	**(United Kingdom) Team LNT**	**(United Kingdom) Chris Hoy** **(United Kingdom) Charlie Robertson**	**Ginetta-Juno LMP3**	MI	**141**
19	**LMP3**	**3**	**(United Kingdom) Team LNT**	**(United Kingdom) Chris Hoy** **(United Kingdom) Charlie Robertson**	**Nissan VK50 5.0 L V8**	MI	**141**
20	GTC	59	(France) TDS Racing	(France) Eric Dermont (France) Dino Lunardi (France) Franck Perera	BMW Z4 GT3	D	139
20	GTC	59	(France) TDS Racing	(France) Eric Dermont (France) Dino Lunardi (France) Franck Perera	BMW 4.4 L V8	D	139
21	GTC	68	(Denmark) Massive Motorsport	(Denmark) Casper Elgaard (Denmark) Simon Møller (Denmark) Kristian Poulsen	Aston Martin V12 Vantage GT3	D	139
21	GTC	68	(Denmark) Massive Motorsport	(Denmark) Casper Elgaard (Denmark) Simon Møller (Denmark) Kristian Poulsen	Aston Martin 5.9 L V12	D	139
22	LMP3	5	(Italy) Villorba Corse	(Italy) Roberto Lacorte (Italy) Giorgio Sernagiotto	Ginetta-Juno LMP3	MI	133
22	LMP3	5	(Italy) Villorba Corse	(Italy) Roberto Lacorte (Italy) Giorgio Sernagiotto	Nissan VK50 5.0 L V8	MI	133
23	LMGTE	56	(Austria) AT Racing	(Belarus) Alexander Talkanitsa, Jr. (Belarus) Alexander Talkanitsa, Sr. (Italy) Alessandro Pier Guidi	Ferrari 458 Italia GT2	D	126
23	LMGTE	56	(Austria) AT Racing	(Belarus) Alexander Talkanitsa, Jr. (Belarus) Alexander Talkanitsa, Sr. (Italy) Alessandro Pier Guidi	Ferrari 4.5 L V8	D	126
24	GTC	63	(Italy) AF Corse	(Italy) Marco Cioci (Russia) Ilya Melnikov (Italy) Giorgio Roda	Ferrari 458 Italia GT3	D	118
24	GTC	63	(Italy) AF Corse	(Italy) Marco Cioci (Russia) Ilya Melnikov (Italy) Giorgio Roda	Ferrari 4.5 L V8	D	118
25	LMP3	2	(United Kingdom) Team LNT	(Russia) Mark Shulzhitskiy (France) Gaëtan Paletou	Ginetta-Juno LMP3	MI	116
25	LMP3	2	(United Kingdom) Team LNT	(Russia) Mark Shulzhitskiy (France) Gaëtan Paletou	Nissan VK50 5.0 L V8	MI	116
DNF	LMP2	27	(Russia) SMP Racing	(Italy) Maurizio Mediani (France) Nicolas Minassian (Russia) David Markozov	BR Engineering BR01	MI	100
DNF	LMP2	27	(Russia) SMP Racing	(Italy) Maurizio Mediani (France) Nicolas Minassian (Russia) David Markozov	Nissan VK45DE 4.5 L V8	MI	100
DNF	LMP3	15	(Spain) SVK by Speed Factory	(Latvia) Konstantīns Calko (Spain) Jésus Fuster (Lithuania) Dainius Matijošaitis	Ginetta-Juno LMP3	MI	78
DNF	LMP3	15	(Spain) SVK by Speed Factory	(Latvia) Konstantīns Calko (Spain) Jésus Fuster (Lithuania) Dainius Matijošaitis	Nissan VK50 5.0 L V8	MI	78
DNF	LMP2	44	(San Marino) Ibañez Racing	(France) Pierre Perret (Japan) Yutaka Yamagishi	Oreca 03	D	58
DNF	LMP2	44	(San Marino) Ibañez Racing	(France) Pierre Perret (Japan) Yutaka Yamagishi	Nissan VK45DE 4.5 L V8	D	58
DNF	GTC	64	(Italy) AF Corse	(Denmark) Mads Rasmussen (Portugal) Francisco Guedes (Portugal) Filipe Barreiros	Ferrari 458 Italia GT3	D	44
DNF	GTC	64	(Italy) AF Corse	(Denmark) Mads Rasmussen (Portugal) Francisco Guedes (Portugal) Filipe Barreiros	Ferrari 4.5 L V8	D	44

European Le Mans Series
Previous race: Imola	2015 season	Next race: Le Castellet
