= 2015 4 Hours of Estoril =

Endurance motor race

The Circuito do Estoril

The 2015 4 Hours of Estoril was an endurance motor race held at Circuito do Estoril in Alcabideche, Portugal on 17–18 October 2015. It was the fifth and final round of the 2015 European Le Mans Series.

== Race ==
=== Race result ===
Class winners in bold.

Pos	Class	No.	Team	Drivers	Chassis	Tyre	Laps
Pos	Class	No.	Team	Drivers	Engine	Tyre	Laps
1	**LMP2**	**46**	**(France) Thiriet by TDS Racing**	**(France) Pierre Thiriet** **(France) Ludovic Badey** **(France) Nicolas Lapierre**	**Oreca 05**	D	**137**
1	**LMP2**	**46**	**(France) Thiriet by TDS Racing**	**(France) Pierre Thiriet** **(France) Ludovic Badey** **(France) Nicolas Lapierre**	**Nissan VK45DE 4.5 L V8**	D	**137**
2	LMP2	41	(United Kingdom) Greaves Motorsport	(Switzerland) Gary Hirsch (United Kingdom) Jon Lancaster (Sweden) Björn Wirdheim	Gibson 015S	D	137
2	LMP2	41	(United Kingdom) Greaves Motorsport	(Switzerland) Gary Hirsch (United Kingdom) Jon Lancaster (Sweden) Björn Wirdheim	Nissan VK45DE 4.5 L V8	D	137
3	LMP2	21	(Russia) AF Racing	(Russia) Mikhail Aleshin (Russia) Viktor Shaytar (Russia) Kirill Ladygin	BR Engineering BR01	D	137
3	LMP2	21	(Russia) AF Racing	(Russia) Mikhail Aleshin (Russia) Viktor Shaytar (Russia) Kirill Ladygin	Nissan VK45DE 4.5 L V8	D	137
4	LMP2	38	(United Kingdom) Jota Sport	(United Kingdom) Simon Dolan (Portugal) Filipe Albuquerque (United Kingdom) Harry Tincknell	Gibson 015S	D	136
4	LMP2	38	(United Kingdom) Jota Sport	(United Kingdom) Simon Dolan (Portugal) Filipe Albuquerque (United Kingdom) Harry Tincknell	Nissan VK45DE 4.5 L V8	D	136
5	LMP2	20	(Russia) AF Racing	(Italy) Maurizio Mediani (France) Nicolas Minassian (Russia) David Markozov	BR Engineering BR01	D	136
5	LMP2	20	(Russia) AF Racing	(Italy) Maurizio Mediani (France) Nicolas Minassian (Russia) David Markozov	Nissan VK45DE 4.5 L V8	D	136
6	LMP2	33	(Philippines) Eurasia Motorsport	(China) Pu Jun Jin (Netherlands) Nick de Bruijn	Oreca 03R	D	135
6	LMP2	33	(Philippines) Eurasia Motorsport	(China) Pu Jun Jin (Netherlands) Nick de Bruijn	Nissan VK45DE 4.5 L V8	D	135
7	LMP2	25	(Portugal) Algarve Pro Racing	(United Kingdom) Michael Munemann (Italy) Andrea Roda (United Kingdom) James Winslow	Ligier JS P2	D	131
7	LMP2	25	(Portugal) Algarve Pro Racing	(United Kingdom) Michael Munemann (Italy) Andrea Roda (United Kingdom) James Winslow	Nissan VK45DE 4.5 L V8	D	131
8	LMP2	40	(United States) Krohn Racing	(United States) Tracy Krohn (Sweden) Niclas Jönsson (France) Olivier Pla	Ligier JS P2	MI	131
8	LMP2	40	(United States) Krohn Racing	(United States) Tracy Krohn (Sweden) Niclas Jönsson (France) Olivier Pla	Judd HK 3.6 L V8	MI	131
9	**LMGTE**	**52**	**(Belgium) BMW Team Marc VDS**	**(France) Henry Hassid** **(Finland) Jesse Krohn** **(United Kingdom) Andy Priaulx**	**BMW Z4 GTE**	D	**129**
9	**LMGTE**	**52**	**(Belgium) BMW Team Marc VDS**	**(France) Henry Hassid** **(Finland) Jesse Krohn** **(United Kingdom) Andy Priaulx**	**BMW 4.4 L V8**	D	**129**
10	LMGTE	99	(United Kingdom) Aston Martin Racing	(United Kingdom) Jonathan Adam (United Kingdom) Andrew Howard (United Kingdom) Alex MacDowall	Aston Martin Vantage GTE	D	128
10	LMGTE	99	(United Kingdom) Aston Martin Racing	(United Kingdom) Jonathan Adam (United Kingdom) Andrew Howard (United Kingdom) Alex MacDowall	Aston Martin 4.5 L V8	D	128
11	LMGTE	86	(United Kingdom) Gulf Racing UK	(United Kingdom) Michael Wainwright (United Kingdom) Phil Keen (United Kingdom) Adam Carroll	Porsche 911 RSR	D	128
11	LMGTE	86	(United Kingdom) Gulf Racing UK	(United Kingdom) Michael Wainwright (United Kingdom) Phil Keen (United Kingdom) Adam Carroll	Porsche 4.0 L Flat-6	D	128
12	LMGTE	55	(Italy) AF Corse	(United Kingdom) Duncan Cameron (Republic of Ireland) Matt Griffin (United Kingdom) Aaron Scott	Ferrari 458 Italia GT2	D	128
12	LMGTE	55	(Italy) AF Corse	(United Kingdom) Duncan Cameron (Republic of Ireland) Matt Griffin (United Kingdom) Aaron Scott	Ferrari 4.5 L V8	D	128
13	LMGTE	60	(Denmark) Formula Racing	(Denmark) Johnny Laursen (Denmark) Mikkel Mac (Italy) Andrea Rizzoli	Ferrari 458 Italia GT2	D	127
13	LMGTE	60	(Denmark) Formula Racing	(Denmark) Johnny Laursen (Denmark) Mikkel Mac (Italy) Andrea Rizzoli	Ferrari 4.5 L V8	D	127
14	**LMP3**	**2**	**(United Kingdom) Team LNT**	**(United Kingdom) Michael Simpson** **(France) Gaëtan Paletou**	**Ginetta-Juno LMP3**	MI	**127**
14	**LMP3**	**2**	**(United Kingdom) Team LNT**	**(United Kingdom) Michael Simpson** **(France) Gaëtan Paletou**	**Nissan VK50 5.0 L V8**	MI	**127**
15	LMGTE	56	(Austria) AT Racing	(Belarus) Alexander Talkanitsa, Jr. (Belarus) Alexander Talkanitsa, Sr. (Italy) Alessandro Pier Guidi	Ferrari 458 Italia GT2	D	127
15	LMGTE	56	(Austria) AT Racing	(Belarus) Alexander Talkanitsa, Jr. (Belarus) Alexander Talkanitsa, Sr. (Italy) Alessandro Pier Guidi	Ferrari 4.5 L V8	D	127
16	LMP3	9	(France) Graff	(France) Thomas Accary (United Kingdom) Garry Findlay (France) Eric Trouillet	Ligier JS P3	MI	126
16	LMP3	9	(France) Graff	(France) Thomas Accary (United Kingdom) Garry Findlay (France) Eric Trouillet	Nissan VK50 5.0 L V8	MI	126
17	LMP3	3	(United Kingdom) Team LNT	(United Kingdom) Chris Hoy (United Kingdom) Charlie Robertson	Ginetta-Juno LMP3	MI	125
17	LMP3	3	(United Kingdom) Team LNT	(United Kingdom) Chris Hoy (United Kingdom) Charlie Robertson	Nissan VK50 5.0 L V8	MI	125
18	**GTC**	**63**	**(Italy) AF Corse**	**(Italy) Marco Cioci** **(Russia) Ilya Melnikov** **(Italy) Giorgio Roda**	**Ferrari 458 Italia GT3**	D	**125**
18	**GTC**	**63**	**(Italy) AF Corse**	**(Italy) Marco Cioci** **(Russia) Ilya Melnikov** **(Italy) Giorgio Roda**	**Ferrari 4.5 L V8**	D	**125**
19	GTC	59	(France) TDS Racing	(France) Eric Dermont (France) Dino Lunardi (France) Franck Perera	BMW Z4 GT3	D	125
19	GTC	59	(France) TDS Racing	(France) Eric Dermont (France) Dino Lunardi (France) Franck Perera	BMW 4.4 L V8	D	125
20	GTC	64	(Italy) AF Corse	(Denmark) Mads Rasmussen (Portugal) Francisco Guedes (Portugal) Filipe Barreiros	Ferrari 458 Italia GT3	D	125
20	GTC	64	(Italy) AF Corse	(Denmark) Mads Rasmussen (Portugal) Francisco Guedes (Portugal) Filipe Barreiros	Ferrari 4.5 L V8	D	125
21	GTC	62	(Italy) AF Corse	(Italy) Francesco Castellacci (Switzerland) Thomas Flohr (United Kingdom) Stuart Hall	Ferrari 458 Italia GT3	D	124
21	GTC	62	(Italy) AF Corse	(Italy) Francesco Castellacci (Switzerland) Thomas Flohr (United Kingdom) Stuart Hall	Ferrari 4.5 L V8	D	124
22	GTC	77	(United Kingdom) TF Sport	(United Kingdom) Euan Hankey (New Zealand) Richie Stanaway (Turkey) Salih Yoluç	Aston Martin V12 Vantage GT3	D	123
22	GTC	77	(United Kingdom) TF Sport	(United Kingdom) Euan Hankey (New Zealand) Richie Stanaway (Turkey) Salih Yoluç	Aston Martin 5.9 L V12	D	123
23	LMP3	15	(Spain) SVK by Speed Factory	(Latvia) Konstantīns Calko (Spain) Jesús Fuster (Lithuania) Dainius Matijošaitis	Ginetta-Juno LMP3	MI	123
23	LMP3	15	(Spain) SVK by Speed Factory	(Latvia) Konstantīns Calko (Spain) Jesús Fuster (Lithuania) Dainius Matijošaitis	Nissan VK50 5.0 L V8	MI	123
24	LMGTE	51	(Italy) AF Corse	(Italy) Matteo Cressoni (Italy) Raffaele Giammaria (United States) Peter Mann	Ferrari 458 Italia GT2	D	122
24	LMGTE	51	(Italy) AF Corse	(Italy) Matteo Cressoni (Italy) Raffaele Giammaria (United States) Peter Mann	Ferrari 4.5 L V8	D	122
25	LMGTE	88	(Germany) Proton Competition	(Germany) Christian Ried (Austria) Richard Lietz (Germany) Sebastian Asch	Porsche 911 RSR	D	100
25	LMGTE	88	(Germany) Proton Competition	(Germany) Christian Ried (Austria) Richard Lietz (Germany) Sebastian Asch	Porsche 4.0 L Flat-6	D	100
DNF	LMP2	48	(Republic of Ireland) Murphy Prototypes	(United Kingdom) Michael Lyons (France) Nathanaël Berthon (United States) Mark Patterson	Oreca 03R	D	111
DNF	LMP2	48	(Republic of Ireland) Murphy Prototypes	(United Kingdom) Michael Lyons (France) Nathanaël Berthon (United States) Mark Patterson	Nissan VK45DE 4.5 L V8	D	111
DNF	GTC	68	(Denmark) Massive Motorsport	(Denmark) Casper Elgaard (Denmark) Simon Møller (Denmark) Kristian Poulsen	Aston Martin V12 Vantage GT3	D	82
DNF	GTC	68	(Denmark) Massive Motorsport	(Denmark) Casper Elgaard (Denmark) Simon Møller (Denmark) Kristian Poulsen	Aston Martin 5.9 L V12	D	82
DNF	LMGTE	66	(United Kingdom) JMW Motorsport	(United Kingdom) Rory Butcher (United Kingdom) Robert Smith (United Kingdom) James Calado	Ferrari 458 Italia GT2	D	69
DNF	LMGTE	66	(United Kingdom) JMW Motorsport	(United Kingdom) Rory Butcher (United Kingdom) Robert Smith (United Kingdom) James Calado	Ferrari 4.5 L V8	D	69
DNF	LMP3	5	(Italy) Villorba Corse	(Italy) Roberto Lacorte (Italy) Giorgio Sernagiotto	Ginetta-Juno LMP3	MI	46
DNF	LMP3	5	(Italy) Villorba Corse	(Italy) Roberto Lacorte (Italy) Giorgio Sernagiotto	Nissan VK50 5.0 L V8	MI	46
DNF	LMP2	29	(Germany) Pegasus Racing	(France) Léo Roussel (China) David Cheng (United Kingdom) Jonathan Coleman	Morgan LMP2	MI	9
DNF	LMP2	29	(Germany) Pegasus Racing	(France) Léo Roussel (China) David Cheng (United Kingdom) Jonathan Coleman	Nissan VK45DE 4.5 L V8	MI	9

European Le Mans Series
Previous race: Le Castellet	2015 season	Next race: none
