= 2015 European Le Mans Series =

Seasons
- ← 2014 2016 →

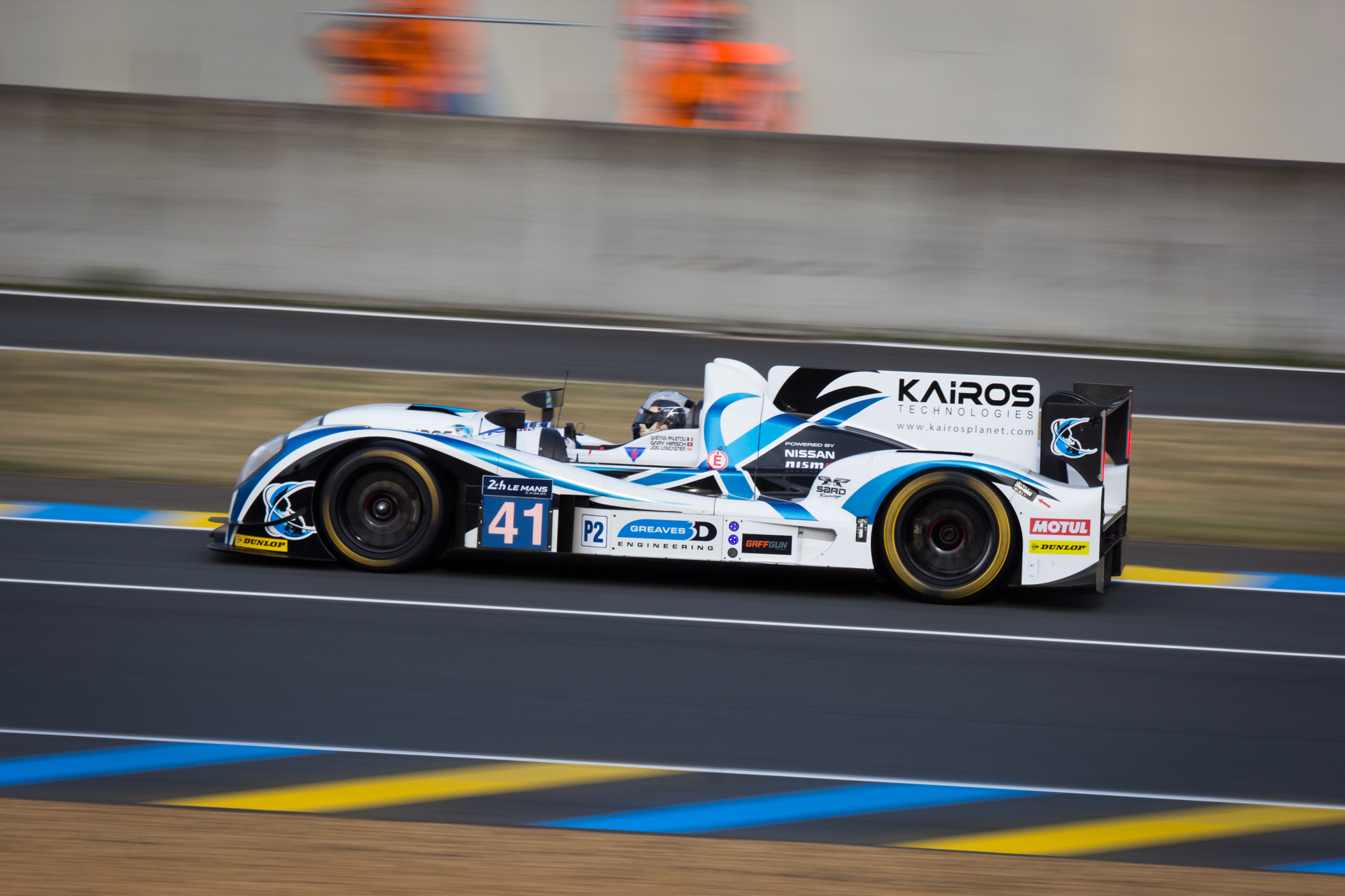
Greaves Motorsport No. 41 Gibson 015S, winner of the 2015 European Le Mans Series in the LMP2 class

The 2015 European Le Mans Series season was the twelfth season of the Automobile Club de l'Ouest's (ACO) European Le Mans Series. The five-event season began at Silverstone Circuit, in conjunction with the FIA World Endurance Championship, on 11 April and finished at Autódromo do Estoril on 18 October.

In the lead LMP2 class, three teams did battle for the championship title; Greaves Motorsport, Thiriet by TDS Racing and Jota Sport. Jota Sport, and drivers Filipe Albuquerque, Simon Dolan and Harry Tincknell led the standings into the final race at Estoril, having won previously at the Red Bull Ring. However, it was Greaves Motorsport with the triumvirate of Gary Hirsch, Jon Lancaster and Björn Wirdheim who won the championship title; after winning at Silverstone, and Le Castellet, the trio finished second to Thiriet by TDS Racing in Estoril to secure the title by two points. Thiriet by TDS Racing's victory in Portugal – the team's second after a previous win at Imola – also allowed them to move ahead of Jota Sport in the teams' standings, with Ludovic Badey and Pierre Thiriet finishing as runners-up in the drivers' championship standings. Badey and Thiriet's victories were shared with Tristan Gommendy at Imola and Nicolas Lapierre at Estoril. In the new-for-2015 LMP3 class, Lawrence Tomlinson's Team LNT outfit won four of the five races during the season; three of which were won by former cyclist Chris Hoy and his teammate Charlie Robertson as they won the championship title with a round to spare. Hoy and Robertson finished 35 points clear of another Team LNT driver Gaëtan Paletou, who won the final race of the season with Mike Simpson at Estoril. Third place in the championship went to SVK by Speed Factory, and their drivers Konstantīns Calko and Dainius Matijošaitis. LNT's only defeat during the season occurred at Imola, when Morten Dons and Rob Garofall won for the University of Bolton team.

Successive victories at the Red Bull Ring and Le Castellet allowed the Formula Racing team with drivers Johnny Laursen, Mikkel Mac and Andrea Rizzoli to clinch their respective LMGTE championship titles. They won the championship by four points from the BMW Sports Trophy Marc VDS outfit of Henry Hassid, Jesse Krohn and Andy Priaulx, who were the race winners at Estoril. Third place in the championship went to the AF Corse team of Duncan Cameron, Matt Griffin and Aaron Scott. Two other teams won races during the season; Gulf Racing UK won on home soil at Silverstone with an all-British crew of Adam Carroll, Phil Keen and Michael Wainwright, while AT Racing won at Imola with the father-and-son crew of Alexander Talkanitsa Jr. and Alexander Talkanitsa Sr. along with Alessandro Pier Guidi.

While in GTC, TDS Racing finished 20 points clear of their closest rivals to take the respective titles in the class. The all-French crew of Eric Dermont, Dino Lunardi and Franck Perera won two races at Silverstone and at Le Castellet, and sealed the title with second at Estoril. Second place in the championship went to another crew that won two races during the season; Francesco Castellacci and Stuart Hall won successive races at Imola and the Red Bull Ring for AF Corse, sharing victories with Rino Mastronardi (Imola) and Thomas Flohr (Red Bull Ring). Another AF Corse crew finished in third in the drivers' championship, as Francisco Guedes and Mads Rasmussen were able to fend off Marco Cioci, Ilya Melnikov and Giorgio Roda for the position despite the latter trio winning the final race at Estoril.

== Regulations ==
The 2015 season saw the introduction of the new LMP3 class, which was announced by the ACO during the 2014 season. The aim of the new class was to introduce young drivers and teams to endurance racing before they progressed to the higher classes of prototype racing, LMP2 and ultimately LMP1.

The chassis, which could be built by any constructor, was powered by a 5-litre normally-aspirated V8 Nissan VK50 engine, producing 420hp. Gearboxes were provided by Xtrac. The approximate running costs for a car over the course of the season was estimated to be between 350,000 and 400,000 euros.

== Calendar ==
The provisional 2015 calendar was announced at the final round of the 2014 season in Estoril. The calendar once again comprised five events, featuring the same five circuits that hosted events in 2014. For the third consecutive season, Silverstone hosted the opening rounds of both the European Le Mans Series and the FIA World Endurance Championship.

Rnd	Race	Circuit	Location	Date
1	4 Hours of Silverstone	(United Kingdom) Silverstone Circuit	Silverstone, United Kingdom	11 April
2	4 Hours of Imola	(Italy) Autodromo Enzo e Dino Ferrari	Imola, Italy	17 May
3	4 Hours of Red Bull Ring	(Austria) Red Bull Ring	Spielberg, Austria	12 July
4	4 Hours of Le Castellet	(France) Circuit Paul Ricard	Le Castellet, France	6 September
5	4 Hours of Estoril	(Portugal) Autódromo do Estoril	Estoril, Portugal	18 October

== Entry list ==
The entry list was announced on 5 February 2015.

=== LMP2 ===
Entrant/Team	Car	Engine	Tyre	No.	Drivers	Rounds
(Portugal) Algarve Pro Racing	Ligier JS P2	Nissan VK45DE 4.5 L V8	D	25	(United Kingdom) Michael Munemann	3–5
(Portugal) Algarve Pro Racing	Ligier JS P2	Nissan VK45DE 4.5 L V8	D	25	(Italy) Andrea Roda	3–5
(Portugal) Algarve Pro Racing	Ligier JS P2	Nissan VK45DE 4.5 L V8	D	25	(United Kingdom) James Winslow	3–5
(Germany) Pegasus Racing	Morgan LMP2	Nissan VK45DE 4.5 L V8	M	29	(China) David Cheng	All
(Germany) Pegasus Racing	Morgan LMP2	Nissan VK45DE 4.5 L V8	M	29	(France) Léo Roussel	All
(Germany) Pegasus Racing	Morgan LMP2	Nissan VK45DE 4.5 L V8	M	29	(United Kingdom) Jonathan Coleman	1, 5
(Germany) Pegasus Racing	Morgan LMP2	Nissan VK45DE 4.5 L V8	M	29	(France) Julien Schell	2–3
(Italy) AF Corse (Note: Round 1.) (Russia) SMP Racing (Note: Rounds 2–3.) (Russia) AF Racing (Note: Rounds 4–5.)	Oreca 03; BR Engineering BR01 (Note: Rounds 2–5.)	Nissan VK45DE 4.5 L V8	M (Note: Rounds 1–3.); D	32; 27; 20	(Russia) David Markozov	All
(Italy) AF Corse (Russia) SMP Racing (Russia) AF Racing	Oreca 03; BR Engineering BR01	Nissan VK45DE 4.5 L V8	M D	32; 27; 20	(Italy) Maurizio Mediani	All
(Italy) AF Corse (Russia) SMP Racing (Russia) AF Racing	Oreca 03; BR Engineering BR01	Nissan VK45DE 4.5 L V8	M D	32; 27; 20	(France) Nicolas Minassian	All
(Italy) AF Corse (Russia) SMP Racing (Russia) AF Racing	Oreca 03; BR Engineering BR01	Nissan VK45DE 4.5 L V8	M D	34; 37; 21	(Russia) Mikhail Aleshin	All
(Italy) AF Corse (Russia) SMP Racing (Russia) AF Racing	Oreca 03; BR Engineering BR01	Nissan VK45DE 4.5 L V8	M D	34; 37; 21	(Russia) Kirill Ladygin	All
(Italy) AF Corse (Russia) SMP Racing (Russia) AF Racing	Oreca 03; BR Engineering BR01	Nissan VK45DE 4.5 L V8	M D	34; 37; 21	(Russia) Anton Ladygin	1–3
(Italy) AF Corse (Russia) SMP Racing (Russia) AF Racing	Oreca 03; BR Engineering BR01	Nissan VK45DE 4.5 L V8	M D	34; 37; 21	(Russia) Viktor Shaytar	4–5
(Philippines) Eurasia Motorsport	Oreca 03R	Nissan VK45DE 4.5 L V8	D	33	(Netherlands) Nick de Bruijn	All
(Philippines) Eurasia Motorsport	Oreca 03R	Nissan VK45DE 4.5 L V8	D	33	(China) Pu Jun Jin	1–3, 5
(Philippines) Eurasia Motorsport	Oreca 03R	Nissan VK45DE 4.5 L V8	D	33	(United Kingdom) Richard Bradley	4
(United Kingdom) Jota Sport	Gibson 015S	Nissan VK45DE 4.5 L V8	D	38	(Portugal) Filipe Albuquerque	All
(United Kingdom) Jota Sport	Gibson 015S	Nissan VK45DE 4.5 L V8	D	38	(United Kingdom) Simon Dolan	All
(United Kingdom) Jota Sport	Gibson 015S	Nissan VK45DE 4.5 L V8	D	38	(United Kingdom) Harry Tincknell	All
(United States) Krohn Racing	Ligier JS P2	Judd HK 3.6 L V8	M	40	(Sweden) Niclas Jönsson	All
(United States) Krohn Racing	Ligier JS P2	Judd HK 3.6 L V8	M	40	(United States) Tracy Krohn	All
(United States) Krohn Racing	Ligier JS P2	Judd HK 3.6 L V8	M	40	(Brazil) Oswaldo Negri Jr.	1–2
(United States) Krohn Racing	Ligier JS P2	Judd HK 3.6 L V8	M	40	(France) Julien Canal	3
(United States) Krohn Racing	Ligier JS P2	Judd HK 3.6 L V8	M	40	(France) Olivier Pla	4–5
(United Kingdom) Greaves Motorsport	Gibson 015S	Nissan VK45DE 4.5 L V8	D	41	(Switzerland) Gary Hirsch	All
(United Kingdom) Greaves Motorsport	Gibson 015S	Nissan VK45DE 4.5 L V8	D	41	(United Kingdom) Jon Lancaster	All
(United Kingdom) Greaves Motorsport	Gibson 015S	Nissan VK45DE 4.5 L V8	D	41	(Sweden) Björn Wirdheim	All
(San Marino) Ibañez Racing	Oreca 03R	Nissan VK45DE 4.5 L V8	D	44	(Japan) Yutaka Yamagishi	1–3
(San Marino) Ibañez Racing	Oreca 03R	Nissan VK45DE 4.5 L V8	D	44	(Italy) Michele La Rosa	1
(San Marino) Ibañez Racing	Oreca 03R	Nissan VK45DE 4.5 L V8	D	44	(France) Pierre Perret	2–3
(San Marino) Ibañez Racing	Oreca 03R	Nissan VK45DE 4.5 L V8	D	45	(Italy) Ivan Bellarosa	1–3
(San Marino) Ibañez Racing	Oreca 03R	Nissan VK45DE 4.5 L V8	D	45	(France) José Ibañez	1–3
(San Marino) Ibañez Racing	Oreca 03R	Nissan VK45DE 4.5 L V8	D	45	(France) Pierre Perret	1
(France) Thiriet by TDS Racing	Oreca 05	Nissan VK45DE 4.5 L V8	D	46	(France) Ludovic Badey	All
(France) Thiriet by TDS Racing	Oreca 05	Nissan VK45DE 4.5 L V8	D	46	(France) Pierre Thiriet	All
(France) Thiriet by TDS Racing	Oreca 05	Nissan VK45DE 4.5 L V8	D	46	(France) Tristan Gommendy	1–4
(France) Thiriet by TDS Racing	Oreca 05	Nissan VK45DE 4.5 L V8	D	46	(France) Nicolas Lapierre	5
(Republic of Ireland) Murphy Prototypes	Oreca 03R	Nissan VK45DE 4.5 L V8	D	48	(France) Nathanaël Berthon	All
(Republic of Ireland) Murphy Prototypes	Oreca 03R	Nissan VK45DE 4.5 L V8	D	48	(United Kingdom) Michael Lyons	All
(Republic of Ireland) Murphy Prototypes	Oreca 03R	Nissan VK45DE 4.5 L V8	D	48	(United States) Mark Patterson	All

- Nick Yelloly was scheduled to compete for Jota Sport, but withdrew prior to the start of the season. He was replaced by Harry Tincknell.

=== LMP3 ===
Entrant/Team	Car	Engine	Tyre	No.	Drivers	Rounds
(United Kingdom) Team LNT	Ginetta-Juno LMP3	Nissan VK50VE 5.0 L V8	M	2	(France) Gaëtan Paletou	All
(United Kingdom) Team LNT	Ginetta-Juno LMP3	Nissan VK50VE 5.0 L V8	M	2	(United Kingdom) Mike Simpson	1–2, 4–5
(United Kingdom) Team LNT	Ginetta-Juno LMP3	Nissan VK50VE 5.0 L V8	M	2	(Russia) Mark Shulzhitskiy	3
(United Kingdom) Team LNT	Ginetta-Juno LMP3	Nissan VK50VE 5.0 L V8	M	3	(United Kingdom) Chris Hoy	All
(United Kingdom) Team LNT	Ginetta-Juno LMP3	Nissan VK50VE 5.0 L V8	M	3	(United Kingdom) Charlie Robertson	All
(Italy) Villorba Corse	Ginetta-Juno LMP3	Nissan VK50VE 5.0 L V8	M	5	(Italy) Roberto Lacorte	2–5
(Italy) Villorba Corse	Ginetta-Juno LMP3	Nissan VK50VE 5.0 L V8	M	5	(Italy) Giorgio Sernagiotto	2–5
(United Kingdom) University of Bolton	Ginetta-Juno LMP3	Nissan VK50VE 5.0 L V8	M	7	(United Kingdom) Rob Garofall	1–2
(United Kingdom) University of Bolton	Ginetta-Juno LMP3	Nissan VK50VE 5.0 L V8	M	7	(Germany) Jens Petersen	1
(United Kingdom) University of Bolton	Ginetta-Juno LMP3	Nissan VK50VE 5.0 L V8	M	7	(Denmark) Morten Dons	2
(France) Graff	Ligier JS P3	Nissan VK50VE 5.0 L V8	M	9	(France) Thomas Accary	5
(France) Graff	Ligier JS P3	Nissan VK50VE 5.0 L V8	M	9	(United Kingdom) Garry Findlay	5
(France) Graff	Ligier JS P3	Nissan VK50VE 5.0 L V8	M	9	(France) Eric Trouillet	5
(United Kingdom) Lanan Racing	Ginetta-Juno LMP3	Nissan VK50VE 5.0 L V8	M	11	(United Kingdom) Alex Craven	1–2
(United Kingdom) Lanan Racing	Ginetta-Juno LMP3	Nissan VK50VE 5.0 L V8	M	11	(United Kingdom) Joey Foster	1
(United Kingdom) Lanan Racing	Ginetta-Juno LMP3	Nissan VK50VE 5.0 L V8	M	11	(United Kingdom) Charlie Hollings	1
(United Kingdom) Lanan Racing	Ginetta-Juno LMP3	Nissan VK50VE 5.0 L V8	M	11	(Russia) Mark Shulzhitskiy	2
(Spain) SVK by Speed Factory	Ginetta-Juno LMP3	Nissan VK50VE 5.0 L V8	M	15	(Latvia) Konstantīns Calko	All
(Spain) SVK by Speed Factory	Ginetta-Juno LMP3	Nissan VK50VE 5.0 L V8	M	15	(Lithuania) Dainius Matijošaitis	All
(Spain) SVK by Speed Factory	Ginetta-Juno LMP3	Nissan VK50VE 5.0 L V8	M	15	(Spain) Jesús Fuster	1–3, 5
(Spain) SVK by Speed Factory	Ginetta-Juno LMP3	Nissan VK50VE 5.0 L V8	M	15	(Netherlands) Mirco van Oostrum	4

=== LM GTE ===
Entrant/Team	Car	Engine	Tyre	No.	Drivers	Rounds
(Italy) AF Corse	Ferrari 458 Italia GT2	Ferrari F136 4.5 L V8	D	51	(Italy) Matteo Cressoni	All
(Italy) AF Corse	Ferrari 458 Italia GT2	Ferrari F136 4.5 L V8	D	51	(United States) Peter Mann	All
(Italy) AF Corse	Ferrari 458 Italia GT2	Ferrari F136 4.5 L V8	D	51	(Italy) Raffaele Giammaria	1–3, 5
(Italy) AF Corse	Ferrari 458 Italia GT2	Ferrari F136 4.5 L V8	D	51	(Italy) Andrea Bertolini	4
(Italy) AF Corse	Ferrari 458 Italia GT2	Ferrari F136 4.5 L V8	D	55	(United Kingdom) Duncan Cameron	All
(Italy) AF Corse	Ferrari 458 Italia GT2	Ferrari F136 4.5 L V8	D	55	(Republic of Ireland) Matt Griffin	All
(Italy) AF Corse	Ferrari 458 Italia GT2	Ferrari F136 4.5 L V8	D	55	(United Kingdom) Aaron Scott	All
(Italy) AF Corse	Ferrari 458 Italia GT2	Ferrari F136 4.5 L V8	D	81	(Portugal) Rui Águas	1
(Italy) AF Corse	Ferrari 458 Italia GT2	Ferrari F136 4.5 L V8	D	81	(Italy) Michele Rugolo	1
(Italy) AF Corse	Ferrari 458 Italia GT2	Ferrari F136 4.5 L V8	D	81	(Australia) Stephen Wyatt	1
(Belgium) BMW Sports Trophy Marc VDS	BMW Z4 GTE	BMW P65B44 4.4 L V8	D	52	(France) Henry Hassid	All
(Belgium) BMW Sports Trophy Marc VDS	BMW Z4 GTE	BMW P65B44 4.4 L V8	D	52	(Finland) Jesse Krohn	All
(Belgium) BMW Sports Trophy Marc VDS	BMW Z4 GTE	BMW P65B44 4.4 L V8	D	52	(United Kingdom) Andy Priaulx	All
(Austria) AT Racing	Ferrari 458 Italia GT2	Ferrari F136 4.5 L V8	D	56	(Italy) Alessandro Pier Guidi	All
(Austria) AT Racing	Ferrari 458 Italia GT2	Ferrari F136 4.5 L V8	D	56	(Belarus) Alexander Talkanitsa Jr.	All
(Austria) AT Racing	Ferrari 458 Italia GT2	Ferrari F136 4.5 L V8	D	56	(Belarus) Alexander Talkanitsa Sr.	All
(Denmark) Formula Racing	Ferrari 458 Italia GT2	Ferrari F136 4.5 L V8	D	60	(Denmark) Johnny Laursen	All
(Denmark) Formula Racing	Ferrari 458 Italia GT2	Ferrari F136 4.5 L V8	D	60	(Denmark) Mikkel Mac	All
(Denmark) Formula Racing	Ferrari 458 Italia GT2	Ferrari F136 4.5 L V8	D	60	(Italy) Andrea Rizzoli	All
(United Kingdom) JMW Motorsport	Ferrari 458 Italia GT2	Ferrari F136 4.5 L V8	D	66	(United Kingdom) Robert Smith	All
(United Kingdom) JMW Motorsport	Ferrari 458 Italia GT2	Ferrari F136 4.5 L V8	D	66	(United Kingdom) George Richardson	1–3
(United Kingdom) JMW Motorsport	Ferrari 458 Italia GT2	Ferrari F136 4.5 L V8	D	66	(United Kingdom) Sam Tordoff	1–3
(United Kingdom) JMW Motorsport	Ferrari 458 Italia GT2	Ferrari F136 4.5 L V8	D	66	(United Kingdom) Rory Butcher	4–5
(United Kingdom) JMW Motorsport	Ferrari 458 Italia GT2	Ferrari F136 4.5 L V8	D	66	(United Kingdom) Jonny Cocker	4
(United Kingdom) JMW Motorsport	Ferrari 458 Italia GT2	Ferrari F136 4.5 L V8	D	66	(United Kingdom) James Calado	5
(United Kingdom) Gulf Racing UK	Porsche 911 RSR	Porsche M97/80 4.0 L Flat-6	D	86	(United Kingdom) Adam Carroll	All
(United Kingdom) Gulf Racing UK	Porsche 911 RSR	Porsche M97/80 4.0 L Flat-6	D	86	(United Kingdom) Michael Wainwright	All
(United Kingdom) Gulf Racing UK	Porsche 911 RSR	Porsche M97/80 4.0 L Flat-6	D	86	(United Kingdom) Phil Keen	1–2, 4–5
(United Kingdom) Gulf Racing UK	Porsche 911 RSR	Porsche M97/80 4.0 L Flat-6	D	86	(United Kingdom) Daniel Brown	3
(Germany) Proton Competition	Porsche 911 RSR	Porsche M97/80 4.0 L Flat-6	D	88	(Germany) Christian Ried	All
(Germany) Proton Competition	Porsche 911 RSR	Porsche M97/80 4.0 L Flat-6	D	88	(United Arab Emirates) Khaled Al Qubaisi	1
(Germany) Proton Competition	Porsche 911 RSR	Porsche M97/80 4.0 L Flat-6	D	88	(Austria) Klaus Bachler	1
(Germany) Proton Competition	Porsche 911 RSR	Porsche M97/80 4.0 L Flat-6	D	88	(Austria) Richard Lietz	2–5
(Germany) Proton Competition	Porsche 911 RSR	Porsche M97/80 4.0 L Flat-6	D	88	(Italy) Marco Mapelli	2, 4
(Germany) Proton Competition	Porsche 911 RSR	Porsche M97/80 4.0 L Flat-6	D	88	(Germany) Sebastian Asch	3, 5
(United Kingdom) Aston Martin Racing	Aston Martin Vantage GTE	Aston Martin AM05 4.5 L V8	D	99	(United Kingdom) Jonathan Adam	5
(United Kingdom) Aston Martin Racing	Aston Martin Vantage GTE	Aston Martin AM05 4.5 L V8	D	99	(United Kingdom) Andrew Howard	5
(United Kingdom) Aston Martin Racing	Aston Martin Vantage GTE	Aston Martin AM05 4.5 L V8	D	99	(United Kingdom) Alex MacDowall	5

=== GTC ===
Entrant/Team	Car	Engine	Tyre	No.	Drivers	Rounds
(France) TDS Racing	BMW Z4 GT3	BMW P65B44 4.4 L V8	D	59	(France) Eric Dermont	All
(France) TDS Racing	BMW Z4 GT3	BMW P65B44 4.4 L V8	D	59	(France) Dino Lunardi	All
(France) TDS Racing	BMW Z4 GT3	BMW P65B44 4.4 L V8	D	59	(France) Franck Perera	All
(Italy) AF Corse	Ferrari 458 Italia GT3	Ferrari F136 4.5 L V8	D	62	(Italy) Francesco Castellacci	All
(Italy) AF Corse	Ferrari 458 Italia GT3	Ferrari F136 4.5 L V8	D	62	(United Kingdom) Stuart Hall	All
(Italy) AF Corse	Ferrari 458 Italia GT3	Ferrari F136 4.5 L V8	D	62	(Switzerland) Thomas Flohr	1, 3–5
(Italy) AF Corse	Ferrari 458 Italia GT3	Ferrari F136 4.5 L V8	D	62	(Italy) Rino Mastronardi	2
(Italy) AF Corse	Ferrari 458 Italia GT3	Ferrari F136 4.5 L V8	D	63	(Italy) Marco Cioci	All
(Italy) AF Corse	Ferrari 458 Italia GT3	Ferrari F136 4.5 L V8	D	63	(Russia) Ilya Melnikov	All
(Italy) AF Corse	Ferrari 458 Italia GT3	Ferrari F136 4.5 L V8	D	63	(Italy) Giorgio Roda	All
(Italy) AF Corse	Ferrari 458 Italia GT3	Ferrari F136 4.5 L V8	D	64	(Portugal) Francisco Guedes	All
(Italy) AF Corse	Ferrari 458 Italia GT3	Ferrari F136 4.5 L V8	D	64	(Denmark) Mads Rasmussen	All
(Italy) AF Corse	Ferrari 458 Italia GT3	Ferrari F136 4.5 L V8	D	64	(Portugal) Filipe Barreiros	1–3, 5
(Italy) AF Corse	Ferrari 458 Italia GT3	Ferrari F136 4.5 L V8	D	64	(Belgium) Adrien De Leener	4
(Denmark) Massive Motorsport	Aston Martin V12 Vantage GT3	Aston Martin AM28 5.9 L V12	D	68	(Denmark) Casper Elgaard	All
(Denmark) Massive Motorsport	Aston Martin V12 Vantage GT3	Aston Martin AM28 5.9 L V12	D	68	(Denmark) Simon Møller	All
(Denmark) Massive Motorsport	Aston Martin V12 Vantage GT3	Aston Martin AM28 5.9 L V12	D	68	(Denmark) Kristian Poulsen	All
(United Kingdom) TF Sport	Aston Martin V12 Vantage GT3	Aston Martin AM28 5.9 L V12	D	77	(United Kingdom) Euan Hankey	5
(United Kingdom) TF Sport	Aston Martin V12 Vantage GT3	Aston Martin AM28 5.9 L V12	D	77	(New Zealand) Richie Stanaway	5
(United Kingdom) TF Sport	Aston Martin V12 Vantage GT3	Aston Martin AM28 5.9 L V12	D	77	(Turkey) Salih Yoluç	5
(United Kingdom) Gulf Racing UK	Lamborghini Gallardo LP560 GT3	Lamborghini 5.2 L V10	D	85	(United Kingdom) Daniel Brown	1
(United Kingdom) Gulf Racing UK	Lamborghini Gallardo LP560 GT3	Lamborghini 5.2 L V10	D	85	(Germany) Roald Goethe	1
(United Kingdom) Gulf Racing UK	Lamborghini Gallardo LP560 GT3	Lamborghini 5.2 L V10	D	85	(United Kingdom) Archie Hamilton	1

== Season results ==
Rnd.	Circuit	LMP2 Winning Team	LMP3 Winning Team	LMGTE Winning Team	GTC Winning Team	Results
Rnd.	Circuit	LMP2 Winning Drivers	LMP3 Winning Drivers	LMGTE Winning Drivers	GTC Winning Drivers	Results
1	Silverstone	(United Kingdom) No. 41 Greaves Motorsport	(United Kingdom) No. 3 Team LNT	(United Kingdom) No. 86 Gulf Racing UK	(France) No. 59 TDS Racing	Report
1	Silverstone	(Switzerland) Gary Hirsch (United Kingdom) Jon Lancaster (Sweden) Björn Wirdheim	(United Kingdom) Chris Hoy (United Kingdom) Charlie Robertson	(United Kingdom) Adam Carroll (United Kingdom) Phil Keen (United Kingdom) Michael Wainwright	(France) Eric Dermont (France) Dino Lunardi (France) Franck Perera	Report
2	Imola	(France) No. 46 Thiriet by TDS Racing	(United Kingdom) No. 7 University of Bolton	(Austria) No. 56 AT Racing	(Italy) No. 62 AF Corse	Report
2	Imola	(France) Ludovic Badey (France) Tristan Gommendy (France) Pierre Thiriet	(Denmark) Morten Dons (United Kingdom) Rob Garofall	(Italy) Alessandro Pier Guidi (Belarus) Alexander Talkanitsa Jr. (Belarus) Alexander Talkanitsa Sr.	(Italy) Francesco Castellacci (United Kingdom) Stuart Hall (Italy) Rino Mastronardi	Report
3	Red Bull Ring	(United Kingdom) No. 38 Jota Sport	(United Kingdom) No. 3 Team LNT	(Denmark) No. 60 Formula Racing	(Italy) No. 62 AF Corse	Report
3	Red Bull Ring	(Portugal) Filipe Albuquerque (United Kingdom) Simon Dolan (United Kingdom) Harry Tincknell	(United Kingdom) Chris Hoy (United Kingdom) Charlie Robertson	(Denmark) Johnny Laursen (Denmark) Mikkel Mac (Italy) Andrea Rizzoli	(Italy) Francesco Castellacci (United Kingdom) Stuart Hall (Switzerland) Thomas Flohr	Report
4	Paul Ricard	(United Kingdom) No. 41 Greaves Motorsport	(United Kingdom) No. 3 Team LNT	(Denmark) No. 60 Formula Racing	(France) No. 59 TDS Racing	Report
4	Paul Ricard	(Switzerland) Gary Hirsch (United Kingdom) Jon Lancaster (Sweden) Björn Wirdheim	(United Kingdom) Chris Hoy (United Kingdom) Charlie Robertson	(Denmark) Johnny Laursen (Denmark) Mikkel Mac (Italy) Andrea Rizzoli	(France) Eric Dermont (France) Dino Lunardi (France) Franck Perera	Report
5	Estoril	(France) No. 46 Thiriet by TDS Racing	(United Kingdom) No. 2 Team LNT	(Belgium) No. 52 BMW Sports Trophy Marc VDS	(Italy) No. 63 AF Corse	Report
5	Estoril	(France) Ludovic Badey (France) Nicolas Lapierre (France) Pierre Thiriet	(France) Gaëtan Paletou (United Kingdom) Mike Simpson	(France) Henry Hassid (Finland) Jesse Krohn (United Kingdom) Andy Priaulx	(Italy) Marco Cioci (Russia) Ilya Melnikov (Italy) Giorgio Roda	Report

== Championship Standings ==
Points system

Position	1st	2nd	3rd	4th	5th	6th	7th	8th	9th	10th	Other Classified
Points	25	18	15	12	10	8	6	4	2	1	0.5

== Teams Championships ==
=== LMP2 ===
Pos.	Team	Car	SIL (United Kingdom)	IMO (Italy)	RBR (Austria)	LEC (France)	EST (Portugal)	Total
1	(United Kingdom) No. 41 Greaves Motorsport	Gibson 015S	**1**	4	4	1	2	93
2	(France) No. 46 Thiriet by TDS Racing	Oreca 05	3	1	2	6	1	91
3	(United Kingdom) No. 38 Jota Sport	Gibson 015S	2	**3**	**1**	**3**	**4**	89
4	(United States) No. 40 Krohn Racing	Ligier JS P2	4	5	5	5	8	46
5	(Russia) No. 21 AF Racing	BR Engineering BR01				2	3	33
6	(Philippines) No. 33 Eurasia Motorsport	Oreca 03R	5	7	8	Ret	6	28
7	(Republic of Ireland) No. 48 Murphy Prototypes	Oreca 03R	Ret	2	6	Ret	Ret	26
8	(Russia) No. 20 AF Racing	BR Engineering BR01				4	5	22
9	(Russia) No. 37 SMP Racing	BR Engineering BR01		8	3			19
10	(San Marino) No. 45 Ibañez Racing	Oreca 03	7	6	9			16
11	(Germany) No. 29 Pegasus Racing	Morgan LMP2	Ret	9	7	7	Ret	14
12	(Portugal) No. 25 Algarve Pro Racing	Ligier JS P2			10	8	7	11
13	(Italy) No. 32 AF Corse	Oreca 03	6					8
14	(Italy) No. 34 AF Corse	Oreca 03	8					4
	(San Marino) No. 44 Ibañez Racing	Oreca 03	Ret	Ret	Ret			0
	(Russia) No. 27 SMP Racing	BR Engineering BR01		Ret	Ret			0

Key
Colour	Result
Gold	Race winner
Silver	2nd place
Bronze	3rd place
Green	Points finish
Blue	Non-points finish
Blue	Non-classified finish (NC)
Purple	Did not finish (Ret)
Black	Disqualified (DSQ)
Black	Excluded (EX)
White	Did not start (DNS)
White	Race cancelled (C)
White	Withdrew (WD)
Blank	Did not participate

**Bold** – Pole

=== LMP3 ===
Pos.	Team	Car	SIL (United Kingdom)	IMO (Italy)	RBR (Austria)	LEC (France)	EST (Portugal)	Total
1	(United Kingdom) No. 3 Team LNT	Ginetta-Juno LMP3	1	(**Ret**)	**1**	**1**	**3**	93
2	(United Kingdom) No. 2 Team LNT	Ginetta-Juno LMP3	2	Ret	3	Ret	1	58
3	(Spain) No. 15 SVK by Speed Factory	Ginetta-Juno LMP3	4	2	Ret	3	4	57
4	(United Kingdom) No. 7 University of Bolton	Ginetta-Juno LMP3	3	1				40
5	(Italy) No. 5 Villorba Corse	Ginetta-Juno LMP3		Ret	2	2	Ret	36
6	(France) No. 9 Graff	Ligier JS P3					2	18
7	(United Kingdom) No. 11 Lanan Racing	Ginetta-Juno LMP3	**Ret**	3				16

Key
Colour	Result
Gold	Race winner
Silver	2nd place
Bronze	3rd place
Green	Points finish
Blue	Non-points finish
Blue	Non-classified finish (NC)
Purple	Did not finish (Ret)
Black	Disqualified (DSQ)
Black	Excluded (EX)
White	Did not start (DNS)
White	Race cancelled (C)
White	Withdrew (WD)
Blank	Did not participate

**Bold** – Pole

=== LM GTE ===
Pos.	Team	Car	SIL (United Kingdom)	IMO (Italy)	RBR (Austria)	LEC (France)	EST (Portugal)	Total
1	(Denmark) No. 60 Formula Racing	Ferrari 458 Italia GT2	6	3	1	1	5	83
2	(Belgium) No. 52 BMW Sports Trophy Marc VDS	BMW Z4 GTE	4	4	4	2	1	79
3	(Italy) No. 55 AF Corse	Ferrari 458 Italia GT2	3	5	2	6	4	63
4	(United Kingdom) No. 86 Gulf Racing UK	Porsche 911 RSR	1	8	7	7	3	56
5	(Austria) No. 56 AT Racing	Ferrari 458 Italia GT2	7	**1**	8	**5**	6	55
6	(Germany) No. 88 Proton Competition	Porsche 911 RSR	5	2	5	4	**8**	55
7	(United Kingdom) No. 66 JMW Motorsport	Ferrari 458 Italia GT2	2	6	6	3	Ret	49
8	(Italy) No. 51 AF Corse	Ferrari 458 Italia GT2	Ret	7	**3**	Ret	7	28
9	(United Kingdom) No. 99 Aston Martin Racing	Aston Martin Vantage GTE					2	18
10	(Italy) No. 81 AF Corse	Ferrari 458 Italia GT2	**Ret**					1

Key
Colour	Result
Gold	Race winner
Silver	2nd place
Bronze	3rd place
Green	Points finish
Blue	Non-points finish
Blue	Non-classified finish (NC)
Purple	Did not finish (Ret)
Black	Disqualified (DSQ)
Black	Excluded (EX)
White	Did not start (DNS)
White	Race cancelled (C)
White	Withdrew (WD)
Blank	Did not participate

**Bold** – Pole

=== GTC ===
Pos.	Team	Car	SIL (United Kingdom)	IMO (Italy)	RBR (Austria)	LEC (France)	EST (Portugal)	Total
1	(France) No. 59 TDS Racing	BMW Z4 GT3	**1**	4	2	**1**	**2**	101
2	(Italy) No. 62 AF Corse	Ferrari 458 Italia GT3	Ret	1	**1**	2	4	81
3	(Italy) No. 64 AF Corse	Ferrari 458 Italia GT3	2	3	Ret	4	3	60
4	(Italy) No. 63 AF Corse	Ferrari 458 Italia GT3	Ret	**2**	4	Ret	1	56
5	(Denmark) No. 68 Massive Motorsport	Aston Martin V12 Vantage GT3	Ret	Ret	3	3	Ret	30
6	(United Kingdom) No. 85 Gulf Racing UK	Lamborghini Gallardo LP560 GT3	3					15
7	(United Kingdom) No. 77 TF Sport	Aston Martin V12 Vantage GT3					5	10

Key
Colour	Result
Gold	Race winner
Silver	2nd place
Bronze	3rd place
Green	Points finish
Blue	Non-points finish
Blue	Non-classified finish (NC)
Purple	Did not finish (Ret)
Black	Disqualified (DSQ)
Black	Excluded (EX)
White	Did not start (DNS)
White	Race cancelled (C)
White	Withdrew (WD)
Blank	Did not participate

**Bold** – Pole

== Drivers Championships ==
=== LMP2 Standings ===
Pos.	Driver(s)	SIL (United Kingdom)	IMO (Italy)	RBR (Austria)	LEC (France)	EST (Portugal)	Total
1	(Switzerland) Gary Hirsch	**1**	4	4	1	2	93
1	(United Kingdom) Jon Lancaster	**1**	4	4	1	2	93
1	(Sweden) Björn Wirdheim	**1**	4	4	1	2	93
2	(France) Pierre Thiriet	3	1	2	6	1	91
2	(France) Ludovic Badey	3	1	2	6	1	91
3	(Portugal) Filipe Albuquerque	2	**3**	**1**	**3**	**4**	89
3	(United Kingdom) Simon Dolan	2	**3**	**1**	**3**	**4**	89
3	(United Kingdom) Harry Tincknell	2	**3**	**1**	**3**	**4**	89
4	(France) Tristan Gommendy	3	1	2	6		66
5	(Russia) Mikhail Aleshin	8	8	3	2	3	56
5	(Russia) Kirill Ladygin	8	8	3	2	3	56
6	(Sweden) Niclas Jönsson	4	5	5	5	8	46
6	(United States) Tracy Krohn	4	5	5	5	8	46
7	(Russia) Viktor Shaytar				2	3	33
8	(Russia) David Markozov	6	Ret	Ret	4	5	30
8	(Italy) Maurizio Mediani	6	Ret	Ret	4	5	30
8	(France) Nicolas Minassian	6	Ret	Ret	4	5	30
9	(Netherlands) Nick de Bruijn	5	7	8	Ret	6	28
9	(China) Pu Jun Jin	5	7	8		6	28
10	(France) Nathanaël Berthon	Ret	2	6	Ret	Ret	26
10	(United Kingdom) Michael Lyons	Ret	2	6	Ret	Ret	26
10	(United States) Mark Patterson	Ret	2	6	Ret	Ret	26
11	(France) Nicolas Lapierre					1	25
12	(Russia) Anton Ladygin	8	8	3			23
13	(Brazil) Oswaldo Negri Jr.	4	5				22
14	(Italy) Ivan Bellarosa	7	6	9			16
14	(France) José Ibañez	7	6	9			16
15	(France) Olivier Pla				5	8	14
16	(China) David Cheng	Ret	9	7	7	Ret	14
16	(France) Léo Roussel	Ret	9	7	7	Ret	14
17	(United Kingdom) Michael Munemann			10	8	7	11
17	(Italy) Andrea Roda			10	8	7	11
17	(United Kingdom) James Winslow			10	8	7	11
18	(France) Julien Canal			5			10
19	(France) Julien Schell		9	7			8
20	(France) Pierre Perret	7	Ret	Ret			6
21	(United Kingdom) Jonathan Coleman	Ret				Ret	0
21	(Italy) Michele La Rosa	Ret					0
21	(United Kingdom) Richard Bradley				Ret		0
21	(Japan) Yutaka Yamagishi	Ret	Ret	Ret			0

Key
Colour	Result
Gold	Race winner
Silver	2nd place
Bronze	3rd place
Green	Points finish
Blue	Non-points finish
Blue	Non-classified finish (NC)
Purple	Did not finish (Ret)
Black	Disqualified (DSQ)
Black	Excluded (EX)
White	Did not start (DNS)
White	Race cancelled (C)
White	Withdrew (WD)
Blank	Did not participate

**Bold** – Pole

=== LMP3 Standings (top-5) ===
Pos.	Driver(s)	SIL (United Kingdom)	IMO (Italy)	RBR (Austria)	LEC (France)	EST (Portugal)	Total
1	(United Kingdom) Chris Hoy	1	(**Ret**)	**1**	**1**	**3**	93
1	(United Kingdom) Charlie Robertson	1	(**Ret**)	**1**	**1**	**3**	93
2	(France) Gaëtan Paletou	2	Ret	3	Ret	1	58
3	(Latvia) Konstantīns Calko	4	2	Ret	3	4	57
3	(Lithuania) Dainius Matijošaitis	4	2	Ret	3	4	57
4	(United Kingdom) Mike Simpson	2	Ret		Ret	1	43
5	(Spain) Jesús Fuster	4	2	Ret		4	42

Key
Colour	Result
Gold	Race winner
Silver	2nd place
Bronze	3rd place
Green	Points finish
Blue	Non-points finish
Blue	Non-classified finish (NC)
Purple	Did not finish (Ret)
Black	Disqualified (DSQ)
Black	Excluded (EX)
White	Did not start (DNS)
White	Race cancelled (C)
White	Withdrew (WD)
Blank	Did not participate

**Bold** – Pole

=== LM GTE Standings (top-5) ===
Pos.	Driver(s)	SIL (United Kingdom)	IMO (Italy)	RBR (Austria)	LEC (France)	EST (Portugal)	Total
1	(Denmark) Johnny Laursen	6	3	1	1	5	83
1	(Denmark) Mikkel Mac	6	3	1	1	5	83
1	(Italy) Andrea Rizzoli	6	3	1	1	5	83
2	(France) Henry Hassid	4	4	4	2	1	79
2	(Finland) Jesse Krohn	4	4	4	2	1	79
2	(United Kingdom) Andy Priaulx	4	4	4	2	1	79
3	(United Kingdom) Duncan Cameron	3	5	2	6	4	63
3	(Republic of Ireland) Matt Griffin	3	5	2	6	4	63
3	(United Kingdom) Aaron Scott	3	5	2	6	4	63
4	(United Kingdom) Adam Carroll	1	8	7	7	3	56
4	(United Kingdom) Michael Wainwright	1	8	7	7	3	56
5	(Italy) Alessandro Pier Guidi	7	**1**	8	**5**	6	55
5	(Belarus) Alexander Talkanitsa Jr.	7	**1**	8	**5**	6	55
5	(Belarus) Alexander Talkanitsa Sr.	7	**1**	8	**5**	6	55

Key
Colour	Result
Gold	Race winner
Silver	2nd place
Bronze	3rd place
Green	Points finish
Blue	Non-points finish
Blue	Non-classified finish (NC)
Purple	Did not finish (Ret)
Black	Disqualified (DSQ)
Black	Excluded (EX)
White	Did not start (DNS)
White	Race cancelled (C)
White	Withdrew (WD)
Blank	Did not participate

**Bold** – Pole

=== GTC Standings (top-5) ===
Pos.	Driver(s)	SIL (United Kingdom)	IMO (Italy)	RBR (Austria)	LEC (France)	EST (Portugal)	Total
1	(France) Eric Dermont	**1**	4	2	**1**	**2**	101
1	(France) Dino Lunardi	**1**	4	2	**1**	**2**	101
1	(France) Franck Perera	**1**	4	2	**1**	**2**	101
2	(Italy) Francesco Castellacci	Ret	1	**1**	2	4	81
2	(United Kingdom) Stuart Hall	Ret	1	**1**	2	4	81
3	(Portugal) Francisco Guedes	2	3	Ret	4	3	60
3	(Denmark) Mads Rasmussen	2	3	Ret	4	3	60
4	(Italy) Marco Cioci	Ret	**2**	4	Ret	1	56
4	(Russia) Ilya Melnikov	Ret	**2**	4	Ret	1	56
4	(Italy) Giorgio Roda	Ret	**2**	4	Ret	1	56
5	(Switzerland) Thomas Flohr	Ret		**1**	2	4	56

Key
Colour	Result
Gold	Race winner
Silver	2nd place
Bronze	3rd place
Green	Points finish
Blue	Non-points finish
Blue	Non-classified finish (NC)
Purple	Did not finish (Ret)
Black	Disqualified (DSQ)
Black	Excluded (EX)
White	Did not start (DNS)
White	Race cancelled (C)
White	Withdrew (WD)
Blank	Did not participate

**Bold** – Pole
