= BMW Z4 GTE =

Grand touring race car

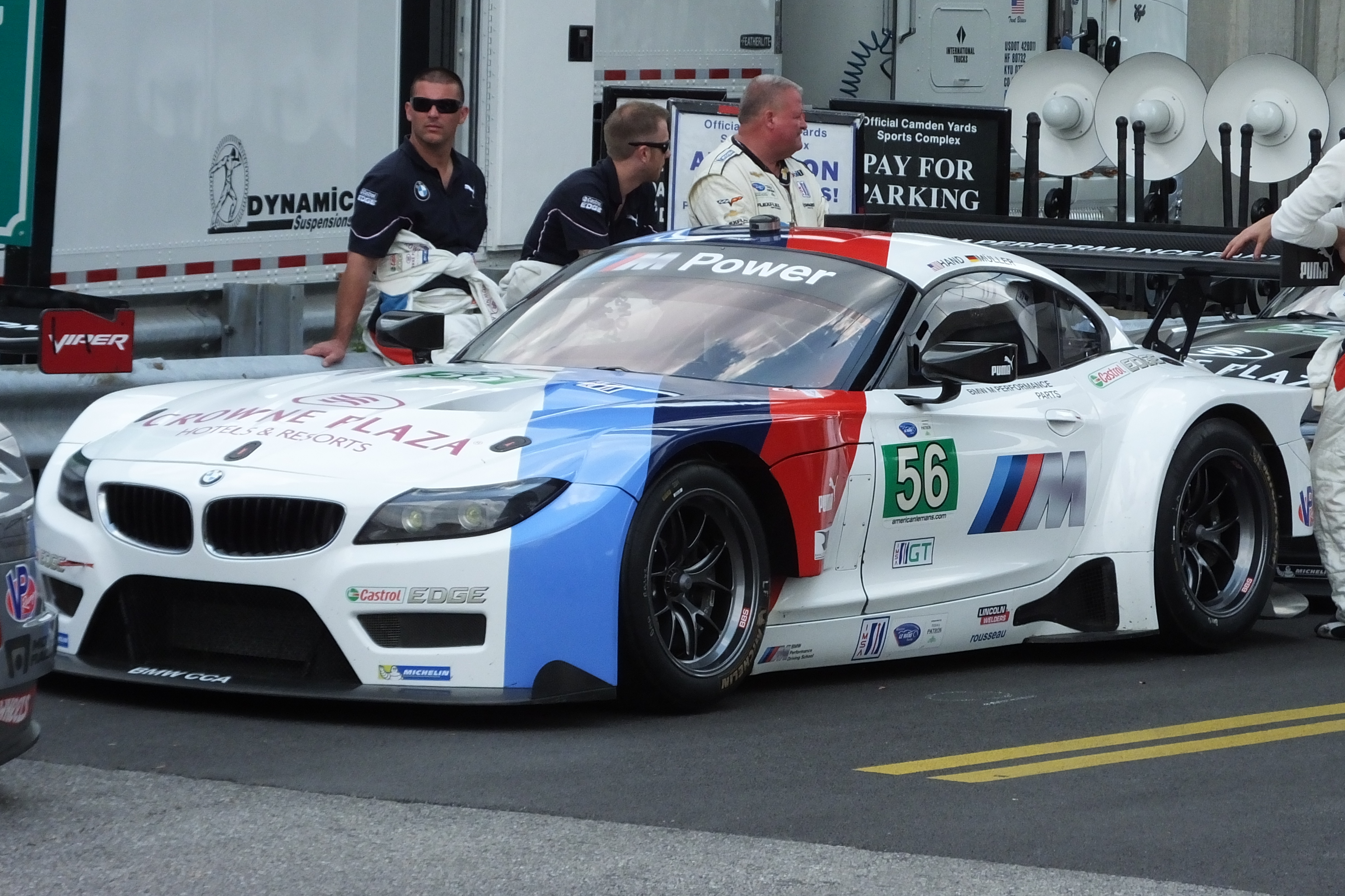
- Category: American Le Mans Series GT (2013); United SportsCar Championship GTLM (2014-2015); European Le Mans Series (2015)
- Constructor: (Germany) BMW
- Predecessor: BMW M3 GT2
- Successor: BMW M6 GTLM

Technical specifications
- Chassis: Unitary construction steel body with welded safety cell made of extremely rigid precision steel tubing; safety fuel tank in CRP sandwich tray; pneumatic four-stamp jack system
- Suspension (front): MacPherson axle with pushrods and wishbone, additionally with adjustable shock absorbers, H&R coil springs
- Suspension (rear): As front
- Length: 4,395 mm (173 in)
- Width: 2,010 mm (79 in)
- Height: 1,205 mm (47 in)
- Wheelbase: 2,512 mm (99 in)
- Engine: BMW P65B44 4.36 L (4,360 cc; 266 cu in) V8 90° cylinder angle, 32-valve, DOHC, four valves per cylinder, naturally aspirated (no turbocharger), front engined, longitudinally mounted
- Transmission: Hewland/Xtrac 6-speed semi-automatic, paddle-shift gearbox, mechanical limited slip differential with additional oil/air cooler
- Power: 480 hp (358 kW) at 7000 rpm (including air restrictor); 500 hp (373 kW) @ 7500 rpm (excluding air restrictor), Over 480 N⋅m (354 ft⋅lbf) at 5500 rpm torque
- Weight: 1,150 kg (2,535 lb) (excluding driver and fuel); 1,245 kg (2,745 lb) (including driver and fuel)
- Fuel: VP Racing Fuels Ethanol E85 + 15% gasoline
- Lubricants: Castrol EDGE later Pennzoil
- Tyres: Michelin; Front: 300/680 - R18; Rear: 310/710 - R18; BBS Kraftfahrzeugtechnik/O.Z. Racing aluminum wheels Front: 12.5 x 18 inches Rear: 13 x 18 inches

Competition history
- Notable entrants: (Germany) / (United States) BMW Rahal Letterman Lanigan Racing (Belgium) BMW Sports Trophy Marc VDS
- Notable drivers: (United States) Bill Auberlen (Belgium) Maxime Martin (Germany) Jörg Müller (United States) Joey Hand (Germany) Uwe Alzen (Germany) Dirk Müller (United States) John Edwards (United Kingdom) Andy Priaulx (Germany) Dirk Werner (United States) Graham Rahal (Canada) Bruno Spengler
- Debut: 2013 12 Hours of Sebring
- First win: 2013 American Le Mans Series at Long Beach
- Last win: 2015 4 Hours of Estoril
- Last event: 2015 4 Hours of Estoril
Races	Wins	Poles	F/Laps
35	6	4	2
- Constructors' Championships: 0
- Drivers' Championships: 0

The BMW Z4 GTE is a racing car which competed in the sports car races such as the American Le Mans Series, Tudor United SportsCar Championship and European Le Mans Series. It competed from 2013 to 2015 and was replaced in 2016 by the M6 GTLM.

== Development ==
In late 2012, BMW Motorsport set out to replace the successful M3 GT/GT2, a car which brought BMW two team and manufacturers' championships (2010 & 2011), one drivers' championship (2011), back to back Sebring 12 Hour GT class wins in 2011 and 2012 in the American Le Mans Series, as well as numerous victories in the then Intercontinental Le Mans Cup (now the World Endurance Championship) in Europe. BMW turned to the successful Z4 GT3 platform to develop a LM GTE specification race car for the ALMS, and any GTE class series.

== Technical ==
The Z4 GTE uses the Z4 body and the same 4.4-litre V8 engine as the GT3 car. The drivetrain and gearbox are much the same in the two different types of Z4. The engine in the GT3 version produces around 500 horsepower, likewise in the GTE version, but the RPM limits are 9000, and 7500, respectively. Most of the differences between the two automobiles are in aerodynamics. The GT3 car has a much more sophisticated aero, with a set of winglets on the front fenders to provide additional downforce. Both cars share a front splitter, while the GTE has slight modifications on the side edges to condition the airflow around the front wheels. The GT3 version also has a double-deck rear wing, with the GTE car having a single deck wing. The rear diffuser is also less aggressive in the GTE car; it also has much wider bodywork in the rear of the car, with heavily modified aero around the wheel arches, front, and specifically rear, compared to the GT3.

== American Le Mans Series ==
The car was debuted at the 2013 12 Hours of Sebring by BMW Team Rahal Letterman Lanigan Racing running competitively despite being a new car. Leading the GTE class at times, both Z4 GTEs encountered suspension problems with three hours to go and went 3–5 laps down from the class leaders. The cars also showed exceptional handling, but a slight lack of straight-line speed as a result. The 2013 Long Beach Grand Prix proved to be the first win for the car, with the #55 Z4 GTE driven by Bill Auberlen and Maxime Martin driving a fine race, bringing home a 1-2 finish for BMW. A second win for the #56 car of John Edwards and Dirk Muller from pole position at Lime Rock Park proved the pace of the car.

== Tudor United SportsCar Championship ==
The Z4 GTE will feature in the GTLM class of the Tudor United SportsCar Championship - a merger of the ALMS and Grand-Am, debuting at the 2014 Rolex 24 Hours of Daytona in January.

Turner Motorsport won the inaugural 2014 Tudor United SportsCar GT-Daytona Championship with an altered version of the Z4 GT3. Drivers Dane Cameron and Markus Palttala won four races (Laguna Seca, Watkins Glen 6-Hour, Road America, and Virginia) with Cameron earning the pole position for the 12 Hours of Sebring. To compete in the GTD class, the Turner Z4 lost its GT3-spec aerodynamics, ABS, and traction control systems.

== Competition history ==
=== Complete American Le Mans Series results ===
(key) Races in bold indicates pole position. Races in italics indicates fastest lap.

Complete American Le Mans Series results
Year	Entrant	Class	Drivers	No.	Rds.	Rounds										Pts.	Pos.
Year	Entrant	Class	Drivers	No.	Rds.	1	2	3	4	5	6	7	8	9	10	Pts.	Pos.
2013	(United States) BMW Team RLL	GT	(United States) Bill Auberlen (Belgium) Maxime Martin (Germany) Jörg Müller (United States) Joey Hand (Germany) Uwe Alzen	55	1-9; 1-7, 9-10; 1, 10; 8; 10	SEB; 4	LBH; 1	LAG; DNF	LRP; 4	MOS; 5	ELK; 7	**BAL**; **4**	**COA**; **4**	**VIR**; **5**	PET; 4	2nd	140
2013	(United States) BMW Team RLL	GT	(Germany) Dirk Müller (United States) Joey Hand (United States) John Edwards (United States) Bill Auberlen	56	All; 1-2, 5, 7, 9; 1, 3-4, 6, 8, 10; 10	SEB; 7	LBH; 2	LAG; 3	**LRP**; **1**	MOS; 6	ELK; 8	BAL; 3	COA; 3	VIR; 4	PET; 2	2nd	140

=== Complete IMSA SportsCar Championship results ===
(key) Races in bold indicates pole position. Races in italics indicates fastest lap.

Complete IMSA SportsCar Championship results
Year	Entrant	Class	Drivers	No.	Rds.	Rounds											Pts.	Pos.
Year	Entrant	Class	Drivers	No.	Rds.	1	2	3	4	5	6	7	8	9	10	11	Pts.	Pos.
2014	(United States) BMW Team RLL	GTLM	(United States) Bill Auberlen (United Kingdom) Andy Priaulx (United States) Joey Hand (Belgium) Maxime Martin	55	All; All; 1-2, 11; 1	DAY; 2	SEB; 3	LBH; 6	LGA; 2	WGL; 10	MOS; 6	IMS; 6	ELK; 8	VIR; 4	COT; 6	PET; 10	7th	298
2014	(United States) BMW Team RLL	GTLM	(United States) John Edwards (Germany) Dirk Müller (Germany) Dirk Werner (United States) Graham Rahal	56	All; All; 1-2, 11; 1	DAY; 4	SEB; 10	LBH; 2	LGA; 10	WGL; 6	MOS; 4	IMS; 7	ELK; 2	VIR; 3	COT; 7	PET; 7	5th	300
2015	(United States) BMW Team RLL	GTLM	(United States) John Edwards (Germany) Lucas Luhr (Germany) Jens Klingmann (United States) Graham Rahal	24	All; All; 1-2, 10; 1	DAY; 4	SEB; 4	LBGP; 5	LGA; 1	WGL; 8	MOS; 2	ELK; 6	VIR; 4	AUS; 7	PET; 2		5th	291
2015	(United States) BMW Team RLL	GTLM	(United States) Bill Auberlen (Germany) Dirk Werner (Brazil) Augusto Farfus (Canada) Bruno Spengler	25	All; All; 1-2, 10; 1	DAY; 2	SEB; 8	**LBGP**; **1**	**LGA**; **2**	WGL; 3	MOS; 4	ELK; 5	VIR; 5	AUS; 1	PET; 4		2nd	305

=== Complete European Le Mans Series results ===
(key) Races in bold indicates pole position. Races in italics indicates fastest lap.

Complete European Le Mans Series results
Year	Entrant	Class	Drivers	No.	Rds.	Rounds					Pts.	Pos.
Year	Entrant	Class	Drivers	No.	Rds.	1	2	3	4	5	79	2nd
2015	(Belgium) BMW Sports Trophy Marc VDS	LMGTE	(France) Henry Hassid (Finland) Jesse Krohn (United Kingdom) Andy Priaulx	52	All; All; All	SIL; 4	IMO; 4	RBR; 4	LEC; 2	EST; 1	79	2nd
