= Nick de Bruijn =

Dutch racing driver (born 1987)

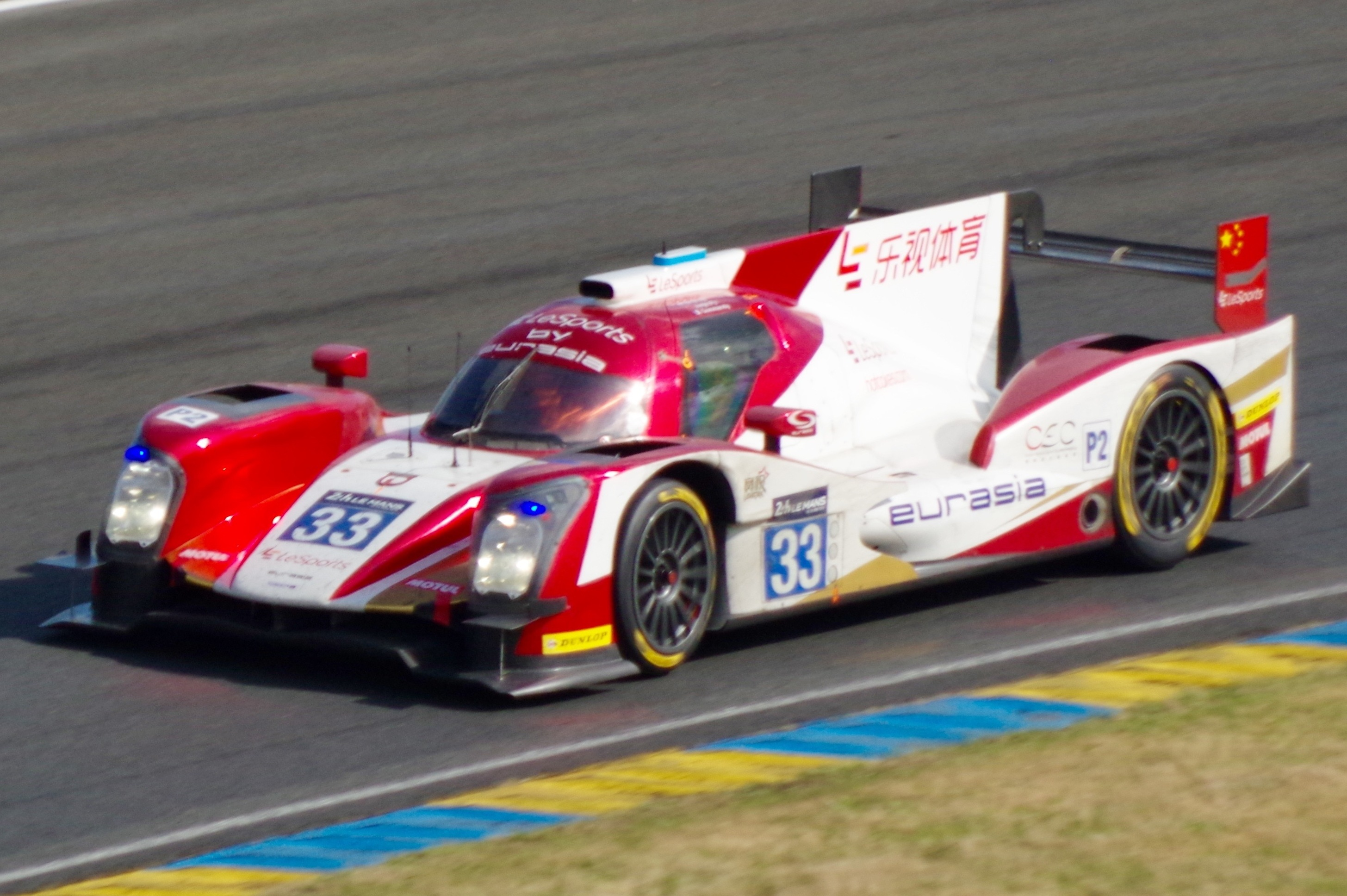
- Nationality: (Netherlands) Dutch
- Born: 21 February 1987 (age 39) Schiedam, Netherlands
- Categorisation: FIA Silver

Championship titles
- 2004: European KF1 Championship

Nick de Bruijn (born 21 February 1987 in Schiedam) is a Dutch racing driver. He has competed in such series as International Formula Master and Formula BMW ADAC. He won the European KF1 Championship karting series in 2004.

== Career ==
In 2015, de Bruijn signed up with Philippine team Eurasia Motorsport to compete in the 2015 European Le Mans Series. He finished ninth in the drivers' championship.

== Racing record ==
=== 24 Hours of Le Mans results ===
Year	Team	Co-Drivers	Car	Class	Laps	Pos.	Class Pos.
2016	(Philippines) Eurasia Motorsport	(France) Tristan Gommendy (China) Pu Jun Jin	Oreca 05-Nissan	LMP2	348	9th	5th
