= Léo Roussel =

French racing driver

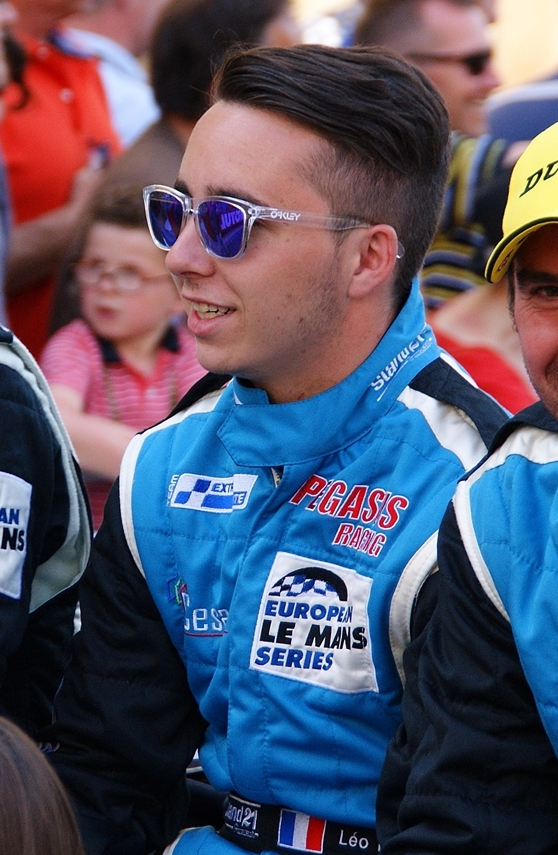
- Roussel in 2014
- Nationality: (France) French
- Born: 31 August 1995 (age 31) Marcoussis, France
- Relatives: Jules Roussel (cousin)

GT World Challenge Europe Endurance Cup career
- Debut season: 2022
- Current team: Emil Frey Racing
- Categorisation: FIA Silver (until 2017, 2021–); FIA Gold (2018–2020)
- Car number: 19
- Starts: 5
- Wins: 0
- Podiums: 0
- Poles: 0
- Fastest laps: 0

Previous series
- 2021 2017–2018–19 2015–2017, 2019 2013 2012–2013 2011–2015: GT World Challenge Europe Sprint Cup; FIA World Endurance Championship; European Le Mans Series Formula Renault 2.0 Alps; Formula Renault Eurocup; V de V Challenge Endurance Proto

Championship titles
- 2017: European Le Mans Series – LMP2
- Statistics up to date as of 27 November 2022.

Léo Roussel (born 31 August 1995) is a French racing driver who last competed in the GT World Challenge Europe Endurance Cup for Emil Frey Racing. He was the 2017 European Le Mans Series champion for G-Drive Racing.

== Career ==
=== Early career ===
Roussel began his motorsport career at the age of seven, competing in local karting competitions in his native France. At the age of 14, in 2009, he scored second-place honors in the Bridgestone Cup and Trophée de France, alongside registering a fourth-place finish in the French Karting F3 Championship. Roussel attended the 24 Hours of Le Mans often as a child, and uncle Patrice had previously competed at Le Mans and in Grand-Am, leading Roussel to mention that his heart was set on endurance racing rather than the junior formula ladder. In 2011, he began competing in the V de V Challenge Endurance, driving a Norma M20 F for his uncle's team, Extrême Limite. Roussel would continue in the series until 2015, taking a win and two podiums throughout his five years of competition in the series.

=== Junior formulae ===
In 2012, Roussel embarked upon a dual campaign in the Formula Renault Eurocup and Formula Renault 2.0 Alps series. He would return to Formula Renault Eurocup in 2013, but it would mark his final season in single-seater competition. Across 41 races in Formula Renault 2.0, Roussel would score just 13 points, all of which were tallied in his lone season in the Formula Renault 2.0 Alps series.

=== Sports car racing ===
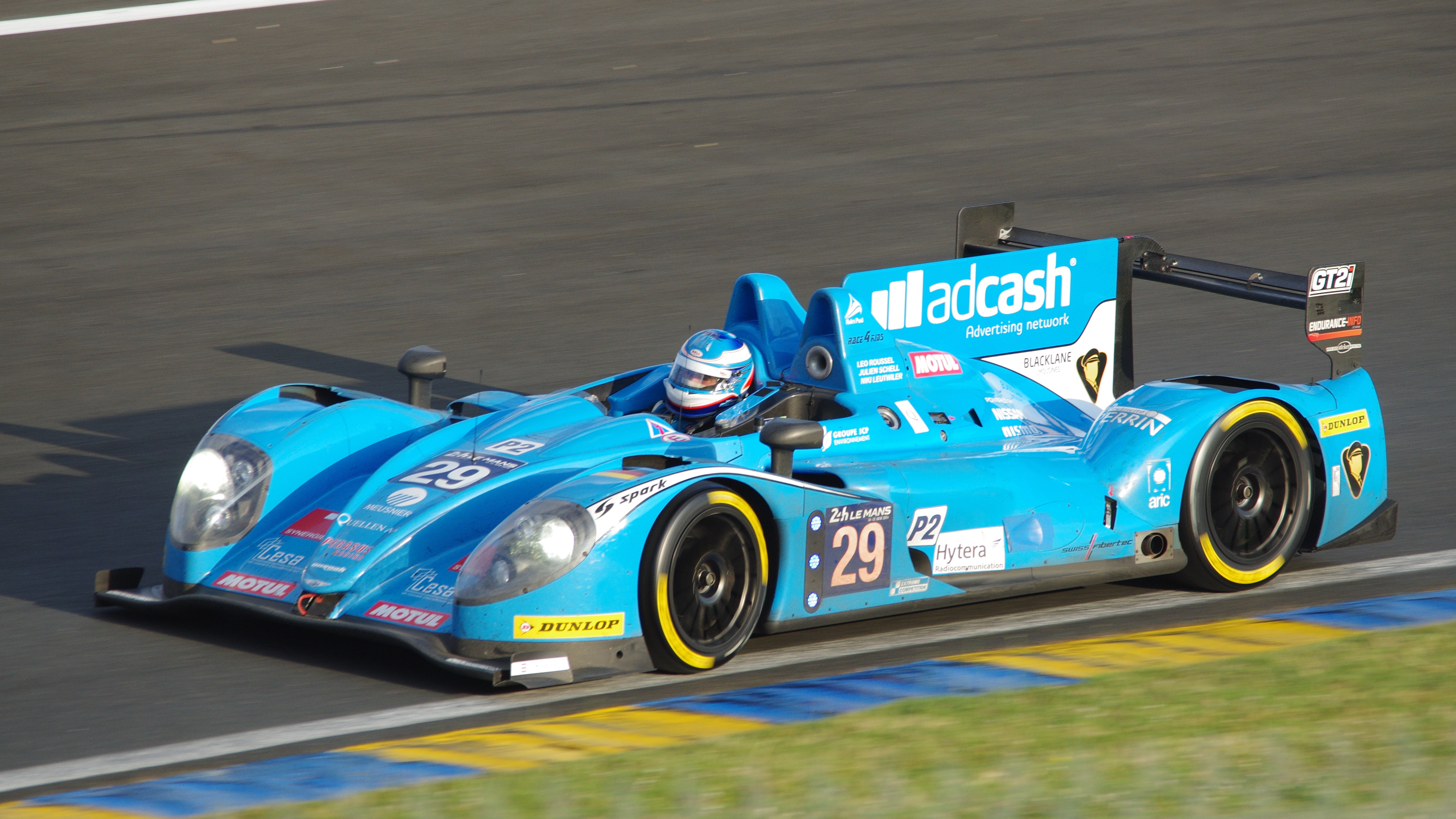
Roussel's Pegasus Racing Morgan LMP2 at the 2014 24 Hours of Le Mans.

==== Prototypes ====
After several years of racing Group CN-level prototypes, Roussel made his debut at the 24 Hours of Le Mans in 2014, driving for Pegasus Racing in the LMP2 class. Despite suffering a heavy crash in qualifying, the team finished tenth in class, 20 laps behind the class-winning Jota Sport entry. In 2015, Roussel began competing full-time in the European Le Mans Series with Pegasus Racing. Roussel returned to the team for the 2016 season, before joining G-Drive Racing for 2017. He and co-driver Memo Rojas would go on to take the LMP2-class championship that season, finishing no lower than fourth and scoring podiums at Silverstone, the Red Bull Ring, Paul Ricard, and Spa, adding a victory at Monza. Following the European Le Mans Series season, Roussel took part in the final two races of the 2017 FIA World Endurance Championship, replacing Pierre Thiriet.

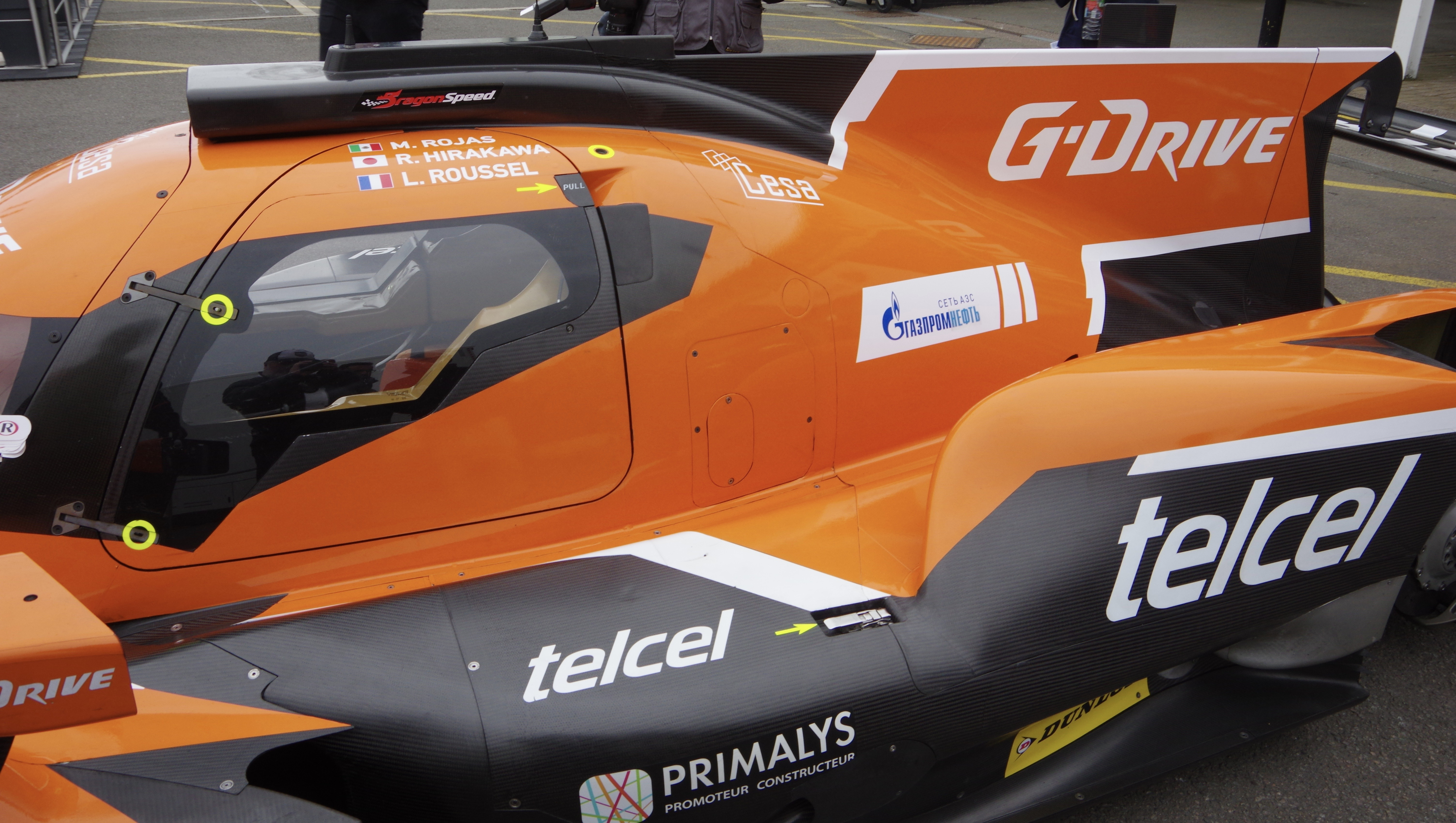
Roussel's G-Drive Racing Oreca, which won the European Le Mans Series in 2017.

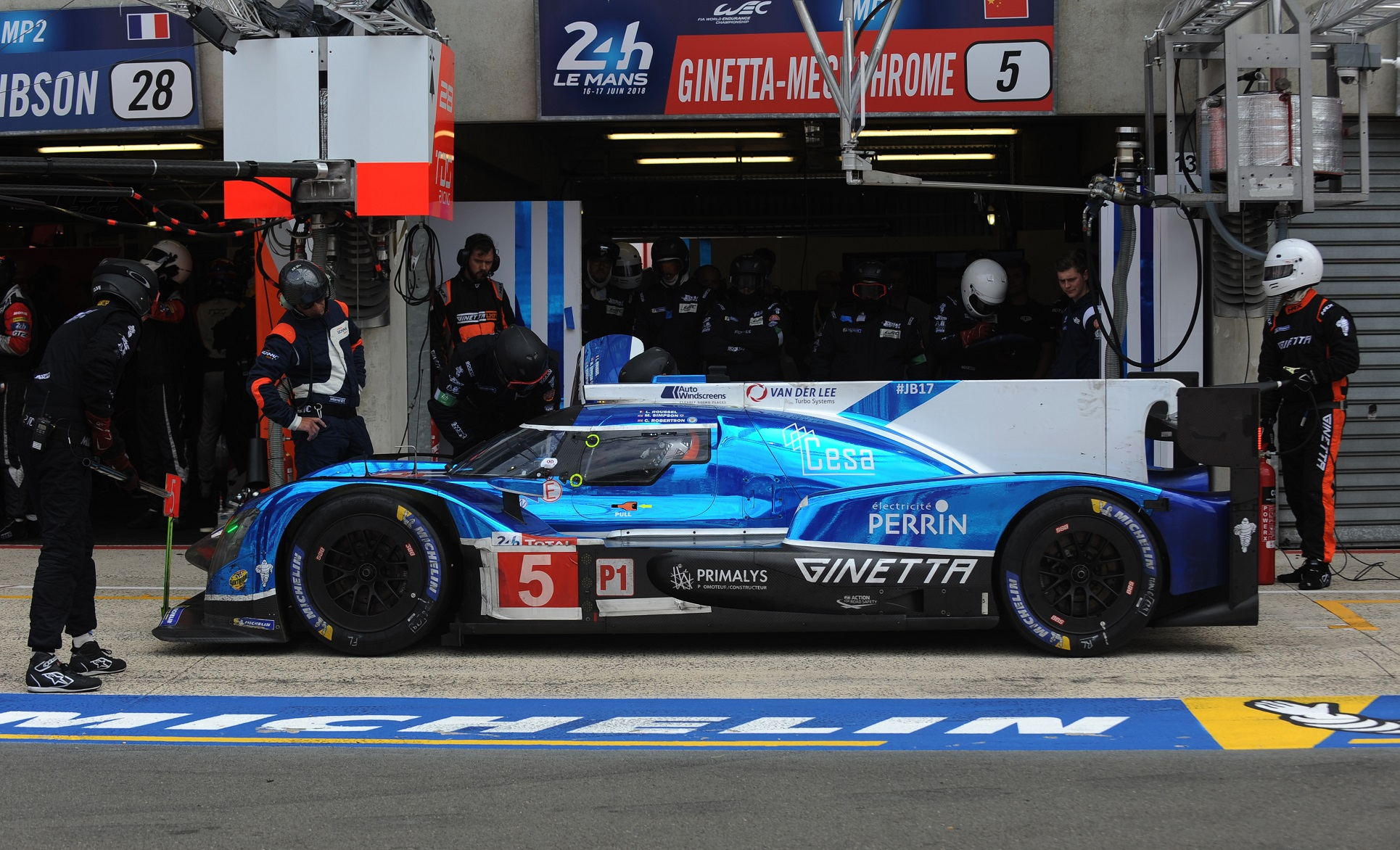
Roussel's No. 5 Ginetta G60-LT-P1 at the 2018 24 Hours of Le Mans.

For 2018, Roussel joined CEFC TRSM Racing's Ginetta LMP1 entry into the WEC for the 2018–19 season. With the program's closure before the 2019 season, he returned to the European Le Mans Series, signing with Inter Europol Competition. However, Roussel broke his back during a practice crash at Monza, forcing him to miss the remainder of the 2019 and 2020 seasons.

==== GT ====
Roussel returned to professional motorsport in 2021, joining Saintéloc Racing in the GT World Challenge Europe Sprint Cup alongside co-driver Christopher Haase. The duo claimed two podiums, at Misano and Valencia, finishing 11th in the overall standings. For 2022, Roussel stepped up to the GT World Challenge Europe Endurance Cup, competing in the Pro class for Emil Frey Racing alongside Giacomo Altoè and Arthur Rougier. The team endured a difficult season, retiring in three of the five races and failing to score championship points.

== Racing record ==
=== Career summary ===
Season	Series	Team	Races	Wins	Poles	F/Laps	Podiums	Points	Position
2011	V de V Challenge Endurance Moderne - Proto	Extreme Limite Aric	1	0	0	?	?	9	40th
2012	Formula Renault 2.0 Alps	ARTA Engineering	13	0	0	0	0	13	21st
2012	Formula Renault 2.0 Eurocup	ARTA Engineering	14	0	0	0	0	0	40th
2012	V de V Challenge Endurance Moderne - Proto	Extreme Limite Aric	1	0	0	0	0	0	NC
2013	V de V Challenge Endurance - Proto	Extreme Limite Aric	4	1	0	0	1	47.5	22nd
2013	Formula Renault 2.0 Eurocup	ARTA Engineering	9	0	0	0	0	0	32nd
2013	Formula Renault 2.0 Eurocup	Manor MP Motorsport	4	0	0	0	0	0	32nd
2014	V de V Challenge Endurance - Proto	Extreme Limite	7	0	0	0	1	61	14th
2014	24 Hours of Le Mans - LMP2	Pegasus Racing	1	0	0	0	0	N/A	10th
2015	European Le Mans Series - LMP2	Pegasus Racing	5	0	0	0	0	14	16th
2015	24 Hours of Le Mans - LMP2	Pegasus Racing	1	0	0	0	0	N/A	9th
2015	V de V Challenge Endurance - Proto	Extreme Limite	6	0	0	0	0	27.5	26th
2016	European Le Mans Series - LMP2	Pegasus Racing	6	0	0	0	0	1	36th
2016	24 Hours of Le Mans - LMP2	Pegasus Racing	1	0	0	0	0	N/A	DNF
2017	European Le Mans Series - LMP2	G-Drive Racing	6	1	1	3	5	110	**1st**
2017	FIA World Endurance Championship - LMP2	G-Drive Racing	2	0	0	0	0	12	24th
2018	24 Hours of Le Mans - LMP1	CEFC TRSM Racing	1	0	0	0	0	N/A	5th
2018–19	FIA World Endurance Championship	CEFC TRSM Racing	1	0	0	0	0	1	38th
2019	European Le Mans Series - LMP2	Inter Europol Competition	1	0	0	0	0	0.5	35th
2021	GT World Challenge Europe Sprint Cup	Saintéloc Racing	10	0	0	0	2	23.5	11th
2022	GT World Challenge Europe Endurance Cup	Emil Frey Racing	5	0	0	0	0	0	NC
2022	Intercontinental GT Challenge	Emil Frey Racing	1	0	0	0	0	1	22nd

^{*} Season still in progress.

=== Complete Eurocup Formula Renault 2.0 results ===
(key) (Races in bold indicate pole position; races in italics indicate fastest lap)

Year	Entrant	1	2	3	4	5	6	7	8	9	10	11	12	13	14	DC	Points
2012	ARTA Engineering	ALC; 1; 24	ALC; 2; 26	SPA; 1; 23	SPA; 2 Ret	NÜR; 1; 33	NÜR; 2 Ret	MSC; 1; 26	MSC; 2; 26	HUN; 1; 18	HUN; 2 Ret	LEC; 1 Ret	LEC; 2; 19	CAT; 1 Ret	CAT; 2 Ret	40th	0
2013	ARTA Engineering	ALC; 1; 18	ALC; 2 DNS	SPA; 1; 24	SPA; 2; 25	MSC; 1; 30	MSC; 2; 32	RBR; 1; 26	RBR; 2; 19	HUN; 1; 23	HUN; 2; 28					32nd	0
2013	Manor MP Motorsport											LEC; 1; 24	LEC; 2; 21	CAT; 1; 21	CAT; 2; 21	32nd	0

=== Complete Formula Renault 2.0 Alps Series results ===
(key) (Races in bold indicate pole position; races in italics indicate fastest lap)

Year	Team	1	2	3	4	5	6	7	8	9	10	11	12	13	14	Pos	Points
2012	ARTA Engineering	MNZ; 1; 12	MNZ; 2; 11	PAU; 1; 9	PAU; 2; 8	IMO; 1; 9	IMO; 2; 22	SPA; 1; 10	SPA; 2; 22	RBR; 1 Ret	RBR; 2; 8	MUG; 1; 23	MUG; 2; 25	CAT; 1 Ret	CAT; 2 DNS	21st	13

=== Complete European Le Mans Series results ===
Year	Entrant	Class	Chassis	Engine	1	2	3	4	5	6	Rank	Points
2015	Pegasus Racing	LMP2	Morgan LMP2	Nissan VK45DE 4.5 L V8	SIL; Ret	IMO; 9	RBR; 7	LEC; 7	EST; Ret		16th	14
2016	Pegasus Racing	LMP2	Morgan LMP2	Nissan VK45DE 4.5 L V8	SIL; Ret	IMO; 12	RBR; Ret	LEC; 12	SPA; Ret	EST; EX	36th	1
2017	G-Drive Racing	LMP2	Oreca 07	Gibson GK428 4.2 L V8	SIL; 2	MNZ; 1	**RBR**; 2	LEC; 2	SPA; 2	POR; 4	1st	110
2019	Inter Europol Competition	LMP2	Ligier JS P217	Gibson GK428 4.2 L V8	LEC; 15	MNZ; WD	BAR	SIL	SPA	POR	35th	0.5

=== Complete 24 Hours of Le Mans results ===
Year	Team	Co-Drivers	Car	Class	Laps	Pos.	Class Pos.
2014	(Germany) Pegasus Racing	(Switzerland) Nicolas Leutwiler (France) Julien Schell	Morgan LMP2	LMP2	336	18th	10th
2015	(Germany) Pegasus Racing	(China) David Cheng (Netherlands) Ho-Pin Tung	Morgan LMP2	LMP2	334	19th	9th
2016	(Germany) Pegasus Racing	(France) Rémy Striebig (France) Inès Taittinger	Morgan LMP2	LMP2	292	DNF	DNF
2018	(China) CEFC TRSM Racing	(United Kingdom) Charlie Robertson (United Kingdom) Mike Simpson	Ginetta G60-LT-P1	LMP1	283	41st	5th

=== Complete GT World Challenge Europe results ===
==== GT World Challenge Europe Endurance Cup ====
Year	Team	Car	Class	1	2	3	4	5	6	7	Pos.	Points
2022	Emil Frey Racing	Lamborghini Huracán GT3 Evo	Pro	IMO; Ret	LEC; Ret	SPA; 6H; 22	SPA; 12H; 15	SPA; 24H; 14	HOC; 14	CAT; Ret	NC	0

^{*} Season still in progress.

==== GT World Challenge Europe Sprint Cup ====
Year	Team	Car	Class	1	2	3	4	5	6	7	8	9	10	Pos.	Points
2021	Saintéloc Racing	Audi R8 LMS Evo	Pro	MAG; 1 Ret	MAG; 2; 10	ZAN; 1; 11	ZAN; 2; 16	MIS; 1; 3	MIS; 2 Ret	BRH; 1; 10	BRH; 2; 10	VAL; 1; 2	VAL; 2; 10	11th	23.5

Sporting positions
Preceded by Simon Dolan; Giedo van der Garde; Harry Tincknell	European Le Mans Series; LMP2 Champion; 2017; With: Memo Rojas	Succeeded by Andrea Pizzitola; Roman Rusinov
