= 2014 4 Hours of Le Castellet =

Motor sport competition

Layout of Circuit Paul Ricard

The 2014 4 Hours of Le Castellet was an endurance auto race held at Circuit Paul Ricard in Le Castellet, France on 13–14 September 2014. It was the fourth round of the 2014 European Le Mans Series season.

== Race ==
=== Race result ===
Class winners in bold.

Pos	Class	No	Team	Drivers	Chassis	Tyre	Laps
Pos	Class	No	Team	Drivers	Engine	Tyre	Laps
1	**LMP2**	**43**	**(Switzerland) Newblood by Morand Racing**	**(France) Gary Hirsch** **(France) Pierre Ragues** **(Austria) Christian Klien**	**Morgan LMP2**	D	**125**
1	**LMP2**	**43**	**(Switzerland) Newblood by Morand Racing**	**(France) Gary Hirsch** **(France) Pierre Ragues** **(Austria) Christian Klien**	**Judd HK 3.6 L V8**	D	**125**
2	LMP2	36	(France) Signatech Alpine	(France) Paul-Loup Chatin (France) Nelson Panciatici (United Kingdom) Oliver Webb	Alpine A450b	D	125
2	LMP2	36	(France) Signatech Alpine	(France) Paul-Loup Chatin (France) Nelson Panciatici (United Kingdom) Oliver Webb	Nissan VK45DE 4.5 L V8	D	125
3	LMP2	48	(Republic of Ireland) Murphy Prototypes	(Venezuela) Rodolfo González (France) Nathanaël Berthon (Brazil) Pipo Derani	Oreca 03	D	125
3	LMP2	48	(Republic of Ireland) Murphy Prototypes	(Venezuela) Rodolfo González (France) Nathanaël Berthon (Brazil) Pipo Derani	Nissan VK45DE 4.5 L V8	D	125
4	LMP2	38	(United Kingdom) Jota Sport	(United Kingdom) Simon Dolan (United Kingdom) Harry Tincknell (Portugal) Filipe Albuquerque	Zytek Z11SN	D	125
4	LMP2	38	(United Kingdom) Jota Sport	(United Kingdom) Simon Dolan (United Kingdom) Harry Tincknell (Portugal) Filipe Albuquerque	Nissan VK45DE 4.5 L V8	D	125
5	LMP2	28	(United Kingdom) Greaves Motorsport	(United Kingdom) Luciano Bacheta (Russia) Mark Shulzhitskiy	Zytek Z11SN	D	125
5	LMP2	28	(United Kingdom) Greaves Motorsport	(United Kingdom) Luciano Bacheta (Russia) Mark Shulzhitskiy	Nissan VK45DE 4.5 L V8	D	125
6	LMP2	24	(France) Sébastien Loeb Racing	(France) Vincent Capillaire (France) Arthur Pic (Italy) Andrea Roda	Oreca 03	MI	123
6	LMP2	24	(France) Sébastien Loeb Racing	(France) Vincent Capillaire (France) Arthur Pic (Italy) Andrea Roda	Nissan VK45DE 4.5 L V8	MI	123
7	LMP2	34	(Switzerland) Race Performance	(Switzerland) Michel Frey (France) Franck Mailleux	Oreca 03	D	122
7	LMP2	34	(Switzerland) Race Performance	(Switzerland) Michel Frey (France) Franck Mailleux	Judd HK 3.6 L V8	D	122
8	**LMGTE**	**55**	**(Italy) AF Corse**	**(United Kingdom) Duncan Cameron** **(Republic of Ireland) Matt Griffin** **(Italy) Michele Rugolo**	**Ferrari 458 Italia GT2**	MI	**119**
8	**LMGTE**	**55**	**(Italy) AF Corse**	**(United Kingdom) Duncan Cameron** **(Republic of Ireland) Matt Griffin** **(Italy) Michele Rugolo**	**Ferrari 4.5 L V8**	MI	**119**
9	LMGTE	56	(Austria) AT Racing	(Belarus) Alexander Talkanitsa Sr. (Italy) Mirko Venturi (Germany) Pierre Kaffer	Ferrari 458 Italia GT2	MI	119
9	LMGTE	56	(Austria) AT Racing	(Belarus) Alexander Talkanitsa Sr. (Italy) Mirko Venturi (Germany) Pierre Kaffer	Ferrari 4.5 L V8	MI	119
10	LMGTE	66	(United Kingdom) JMW Motorsport	(United Kingdom) James Walker (United Kingdom) George Richardson (United Kingdom) Rob Bell	Ferrari 458 Italia GT2	MI	119
10	LMGTE	66	(United Kingdom) JMW Motorsport	(United Kingdom) James Walker (United Kingdom) George Richardson (United Kingdom) Rob Bell	Ferrari 4.5 L V8	MI	119
11	LMGTE	54	(Italy) AF Corse	(Italy) Piergiuseppe Perazzini (Italy) Marco Cioci (United Kingdom) Michael Lyons	Ferrari 458 Italia GT2	MI	119
11	LMGTE	54	(Italy) AF Corse	(Italy) Piergiuseppe Perazzini (Italy) Marco Cioci (United Kingdom) Michael Lyons	Ferrari 4.5 L V8	MI	119
12	LMGTE	80	(Switzerland) Kessel Racing	(Poland) Michał Broniszewski (Italy) Giacomo Piccini	Ferrari 458 Italia GT2	MI	119
12	LMGTE	80	(Switzerland) Kessel Racing	(Poland) Michał Broniszewski (Italy) Giacomo Piccini	Ferrari 4.5 L V8	MI	119
13	LMGTE	86	(United Kingdom) Gulf Racing UK	(United Kingdom) Michael Wainwright (United Kingdom) Adam Carroll (United Kingdom) Ben Barker	Porsche 911 RSR	MI	118
13	LMGTE	86	(United Kingdom) Gulf Racing UK	(United Kingdom) Michael Wainwright (United Kingdom) Adam Carroll (United Kingdom) Ben Barker	Porsche 4.0 L Flat-6	MI	118
14	LMGTE	72	(Russia) SMP Racing	(Italy) Andrea Bertolini (Russia) Viktor Shaitar (Russia) Sergey Zlobin	Ferrari 458 Italia GT2	MI	118
14	LMGTE	72	(Russia) SMP Racing	(Italy) Andrea Bertolini (Russia) Viktor Shaitar (Russia) Sergey Zlobin	Ferrari 4.5 L V8	MI	118
15	LMGTE	76	(France) IMSA Performance Matmut	(France) Raymond Narac (France) Nicolas Armindo (Denmark) Christina Nielsen	Porsche 997 GT3-RSR	MI	118
15	LMGTE	76	(France) IMSA Performance Matmut	(France) Raymond Narac (France) Nicolas Armindo (Denmark) Christina Nielsen	Porsche 4.0 L Flat-6	MI	118
16	LMGTE	81	(Switzerland) Kessel Racing	(Italy) Thomas Kemenater (Italy) Matteo Cressoni	Ferrari 458 Italia GT2	MI	117
16	LMGTE	81	(Switzerland) Kessel Racing	(Italy) Thomas Kemenater (Italy) Matteo Cressoni	Ferrari 4.5 L V8	MI	117
17	**GTC**	**73**	**(Russia) SMP Racing**	**(Monaco) Olivier Beretta** **(Russia) Anton Ladygin** **(Russia) David Markozov**	**Ferrari 458 Italia GT3**	MI	**117**
17	**GTC**	**73**	**(Russia) SMP Racing**	**(Monaco) Olivier Beretta** **(Russia) Anton Ladygin** **(Russia) David Markozov**	**Ferrari 4.5 L V8**	MI	**117**
18	GTC	60	(Denmark) Formula Racing	(Denmark) Jan Magnussen (Denmark) Johnny Laursen (Denmark) Mikkel Mac	Ferrari 458 Italia GT3	MI	117
18	GTC	60	(Denmark) Formula Racing	(Denmark) Jan Magnussen (Denmark) Johnny Laursen (Denmark) Mikkel Mac	Ferrari 4.5 L V8	MI	117
19	GTC	98	(France) ART Grand Prix	(Estonia) Kevin Korjus (France) Grégoire Demoustier (France) Yann Goudy	McLaren MP4-12C GT3	MI	116
19	GTC	98	(France) ART Grand Prix	(Estonia) Kevin Korjus (France) Grégoire Demoustier (France) Yann Goudy	McLaren 3.8 L Turbo V8	MI	116
20	GTC	71	(Russia) SMP Racing	(Russia) Kirill Ladygin (Italy) Luca Persiani (Russia) Aleksey Basov	Ferrari 458 Italia GT3	MI	116
20	GTC	71	(Russia) SMP Racing	(Russia) Kirill Ladygin (Italy) Luca Persiani (Russia) Aleksey Basov	Ferrari 4.5 L V8	MI	116
21	GTC	95	(Italy) AF Corse	(Netherlands) Adrien De Leneer (Monaco) Cédric Sbirrazzuoli	Ferrari 458 Italia GT3	MI	116
21	GTC	95	(Italy) AF Corse	(Netherlands) Adrien De Leneer (Monaco) Cédric Sbirrazzuoli	Ferrari 4.5 L V8	MI	116
22	GTC	94	(Italy) AF Corse	(Italy) Francesco Castellacci (Switzerland) Thomas Flohr (Italy) Andrea Rizzoli	Ferrari 458 Italia GT3	MI	116
22	GTC	94	(Italy) AF Corse	(Italy) Francesco Castellacci (Switzerland) Thomas Flohr (Italy) Andrea Rizzoli	Ferrari 4.5 L V8	MI	116
23	GTC	93	(France) Pro GT by Almeras	(France) Franck Perera (France) Eric Dermont (France) Lucas Lasserre	Porsche 997 GT3 R	MI	116
23	GTC	93	(France) Pro GT by Almeras	(France) Franck Perera (France) Eric Dermont (France) Lucas Lasserre	Porsche 4.0 L Flat-6	MI	116
24	GTC	99	(France) ART Grand Prix	(Mexico) Ricardo González (Switzerland) Karim Ajlani (United Kingdom) Alex Brundle	McLaren MP4-12C GT3	MI	115
24	GTC	99	(France) ART Grand Prix	(Mexico) Ricardo González (Switzerland) Karim Ajlani (United Kingdom) Alex Brundle	McLaren 3.8 L Turbo V8	MI	115
25	GTC	75	(Belgium) Prospeed Competition	(Netherlands) Paul Van Splunteren (France) Mike Parisy (France) Gilles Vannelet	Porsche 997 GT3 R	MI	115
25	GTC	75	(Belgium) Prospeed Competition	(Netherlands) Paul Van Splunteren (France) Mike Parisy (France) Gilles Vannelet	Porsche 4.0 L Flat-6	MI	115
26	GTC	78	Team Russia by Barwell	(Russia) Leo Machitski (Russia) Timur Sardarov (United Kingdom) Jonny Cocker	BMW Z4 GT3	MI	114
26	GTC	78	Team Russia by Barwell	(Russia) Leo Machitski (Russia) Timur Sardarov (United Kingdom) Jonny Cocker	BMW 4.4 L V8	MI	114
27	LMGTE	85	(United Kingdom) Gulf Racing UK	(Germany) Roald Goethe (United Kingdom) Stuart Hall (United Kingdom) Dan Brown	Aston Martin V8 Vantage GTE	MI	114
27	LMGTE	85	(United Kingdom) Gulf Racing UK	(Germany) Roald Goethe (United Kingdom) Stuart Hall (United Kingdom) Dan Brown	Aston Martin 4.5 L V8	MI	114
28	GTC	57	(Russia) SMP Racing	(Russia) Boris Rotenberg (Finland) Mika Salo (Italy) Maurizio Mediani	Ferrari 458 Italia GT3	MI	114
28	GTC	57	(Russia) SMP Racing	(Russia) Boris Rotenberg (Finland) Mika Salo (Italy) Maurizio Mediani	Ferrari 4.5 L V8	MI	114
29	GTC	63	(Italy) AF Corse	(Denmark) Mads Radsmussen (Portugal) Filipe Barreiros	Ferrari 458 Italia GT3	MI	114
29	GTC	63	(Italy) AF Corse	(Denmark) Mads Radsmussen (Portugal) Filipe Barreiros	Ferrari 4.5 L V8	MI	114
30	GTC	59	(France) Team Sofrev-ASP	(France) Christophe Bourret (France) Pascal Gibon (France) Jean-Philippe Belloc	Ferrari 458 Italia GT3	MI	114
30	GTC	59	(France) Team Sofrev-ASP	(France) Christophe Bourret (France) Pascal Gibon (France) Jean-Philippe Belloc	Ferrari 4.5 L V8	MI	114
31	LMGTE	67	(France) IMSA Performance Matmut	(France) Erik Maris (France) Jean-Marc Merlin (France) Éric Hélary	Porsche 997 GT3-RSR	MI	112
31	LMGTE	67	(France) IMSA Performance Matmut	(France) Erik Maris (France) Jean-Marc Merlin (France) Éric Hélary	Porsche 4.0 L Flat-6	MI	112
32	GTC	92	(Italy) Ombra Racing	(Italy) Mario Cordoni (Italy) Marco Zanuttini	Ferrari 458 Italia GT3	MI	112
32	GTC	92	(Italy) Ombra Racing	(Italy) Mario Cordoni (Italy) Marco Zanuttini	Ferrari 4.5 L V8	MI	112
DNF	LMP2	46	(France) Thiriet by TDS Racing	(France) Pierre Thiriet (France) Ludovic Badey (France) Tristan Gommendy	Ligier JS P2	D	89
DNF	LMP2	46	(France) Thiriet by TDS Racing	(France) Pierre Thiriet (France) Ludovic Badey (France) Tristan Gommendy	Nissan VK45DE 4.5 L V8	D	89
DNF	LMGTE	70	(Italy) AF Corse	(France) Yannick Mollegol (France) François Perrodo (France) Emmanuel Collard	Ferrari 458 Italia GT2	MI	68
DNF	LMGTE	70	(Italy) AF Corse	(France) Yannick Mollegol (France) François Perrodo (France) Emmanuel Collard	Ferrari 4.5 L V8	MI	68
DNF	LMP2	29	(Germany) Pegasus Racing	(France) Julien Schell (Austria) Niki Leutwiler (United Kingdom) Jonathan Coleman	Morgan LMP2	D	50
DNF	LMP2	29	(Germany) Pegasus Racing	(France) Julien Schell (Austria) Niki Leutwiler (United Kingdom) Jonathan Coleman	Nissan VK45DE 4.5 L V8	D	50
DNF	LMGTE	58	(France) Team Sofrev-ASP	(France) Anthony Pons (France) Soheil Ayari (France) Fabien Barthez	Ferrari 458 Italia GT2	MI	11
DNF	LMGTE	58	(France) Team Sofrev-ASP	(France) Anthony Pons (France) Soheil Ayari (France) Fabien Barthez	Ferrari 4.5 L V8	MI	11
DNF	LMP2	41	(United Kingdom) Greaves Motorsport	(United Kingdom) Johnny Mowlem (United States) Matt McMurry	Zytek Z11SN	D	0
DNF	LMP2	41	(United Kingdom) Greaves Motorsport	(United Kingdom) Johnny Mowlem (United States) Matt McMurry	Nissan VK45DE 4.5 L V8	D	0

European Le Mans Series
Previous race: 4 Hours of Red Bull Ring	2014 season	Next race: 4 Hours of Estoril
