= 2014 4 Hours of Estoril =

Motor sport competition

Layout of Autódromo do Estoril

The 2014 4 Hours of Estoril was an endurance auto race held at Autódromo do Estoril in Alcabideche, Cascais, Portugal on 18–19 October 2014. It was the fifth and final round of the 2014 European Le Mans Series season.

== Race ==
=== Race result ===
Class winners in bold.

Pos	Class	No	Team	Drivers	Chassis	Tyre	Laps
Pos	Class	No	Team	Drivers	Engine	Tyre	Laps
1	**LMP2**	**24**	**(France) Sébastien Loeb Racing**	**(France) Vincent Capillaire** **(Sweden) Jimmy Eriksson**	**Oreca 03**	MI	**146**
1	**LMP2**	**24**	**(France) Sébastien Loeb Racing**	**(France) Vincent Capillaire** **(Sweden) Jimmy Eriksson**	**Nissan VK45DE 4.5 L V8**	MI	**146**
2	LMP2	43	(Switzerland) Newblood by Morand Racing	(France) Gary Hirsch (France) Pierre Ragues (Austria) Christian Klien	Morgan LMP2	D	146
2	LMP2	43	(Switzerland) Newblood by Morand Racing	(France) Gary Hirsch (France) Pierre Ragues (Austria) Christian Klien	Judd HK 3.6 L V8	D	146
3	LMP2	38	(United Kingdom) Jota Sport	(United Kingdom) Simon Dolan (United Kingdom) Harry Tincknell (Portugal) Filipe Albuquerque	Zytek Z11SN	D	146
3	LMP2	38	(United Kingdom) Jota Sport	(United Kingdom) Simon Dolan (United Kingdom) Harry Tincknell (Portugal) Filipe Albuquerque	Nissan VK45DE 4.5 L V8	D	146
4	LMP2	34	(Switzerland) Race Performance	(Switzerland) Michel Frey (France) Franck Mailleux (Switzerland) Patric Niederhauser	Oreca 03	D	145
4	LMP2	34	(Switzerland) Race Performance	(Switzerland) Michel Frey (France) Franck Mailleux (Switzerland) Patric Niederhauser	Judd HK 3.6 L V8	D	145
5	LMP2	36	(France) Signatech Alpine	(France) Paul-Loup Chatin (France) Nelson Panciatici (United Kingdom) Oliver Webb	Alpine A450b	D	145
5	LMP2	36	(France) Signatech Alpine	(France) Paul-Loup Chatin (France) Nelson Panciatici (United Kingdom) Oliver Webb	Nissan VK45DE 4.5 L V8	D	145
6	LMP2	48	(Republic of Ireland) Murphy Prototypes	(Brazil) Pipo Derani (United Kingdom) James Littlejohn (United Kingdom) Anthony Wells	Oreca 03	D	144
6	LMP2	48	(Republic of Ireland) Murphy Prototypes	(Brazil) Pipo Derani (United Kingdom) James Littlejohn (United Kingdom) Anthony Wells	Nissan VK45DE 4.5 L V8	D	144
7	LMP2	41	(United Kingdom) Greaves Motorsport	(Portugal) Miguel Faísca (United States) Matt McMurry (United Kingdom) James Fletcher	Zytek Z11SN	D	144
7	LMP2	41	(United Kingdom) Greaves Motorsport	(Portugal) Miguel Faísca (United States) Matt McMurry (United Kingdom) James Fletcher	Nissan VK45DE 4.5 L V8	D	144
8	LMP2	29	(Germany) Pegasus Racing	(France) Julien Schell (Austria) Niki Leutwiler (United Kingdom) Jonathan Coleman	Morgan LMP2	D	141
8	LMP2	29	(Germany) Pegasus Racing	(France) Julien Schell (Austria) Niki Leutwiler (United Kingdom) Jonathan Coleman	Nissan VK45DE 4.5 L V8	D	141
9	**LMGTE**	**72**	**(Russia) SMP Racing**	**(Italy) Andrea Bertolini** **(Russia) Viktor Shaitar** **(Russia) Sergey Zlobin**	**Ferrari 458 Italia GT2**	MI	**139**
9	**LMGTE**	**72**	**(Russia) SMP Racing**	**(Italy) Andrea Bertolini** **(Russia) Viktor Shaitar** **(Russia) Sergey Zlobin**	**Ferrari 4.5 L V8**	MI	**139**
10	LMGTE	54	(Italy) AF Corse	(Italy) Piergiuseppe Perazzini (Italy) Marco Cioci (United Kingdom) Michael Lyons	Ferrari 458 Italia GT2	MI	138
10	LMGTE	54	(Italy) AF Corse	(Italy) Piergiuseppe Perazzini (Italy) Marco Cioci (United Kingdom) Michael Lyons	Ferrari 4.5 L V8	MI	138
11	LMGTE	66	(United Kingdom) JMW Motorsport	(Italy) Daniel Zampieri (United Kingdom) George Richardson (United Kingdom) Rob Bell	Ferrari 458 Italia GT2	MI	138
11	LMGTE	66	(United Kingdom) JMW Motorsport	(Italy) Daniel Zampieri (United Kingdom) George Richardson (United Kingdom) Rob Bell	Ferrari 4.5 L V8	MI	138
12	LMGTE	86	(United Kingdom) Gulf Racing UK	(United Kingdom) Michael Wainwright (United Kingdom) Adam Carroll (United Kingdom) Ben Barker	Porsche 911 RSR	MI	138
12	LMGTE	86	(United Kingdom) Gulf Racing UK	(United Kingdom) Michael Wainwright (United Kingdom) Adam Carroll (United Kingdom) Ben Barker	Porsche 4.0 L Flat-6	MI	138
13	LMGTE	85	(United Kingdom) Gulf Racing UK	(Germany) Roald Goethe (United Kingdom) Stuart Hall (United Kingdom) Dan Brown	Aston Martin V8 Vantage GTE	MI	138
13	LMGTE	85	(United Kingdom) Gulf Racing UK	(Germany) Roald Goethe (United Kingdom) Stuart Hall (United Kingdom) Dan Brown	Aston Martin 4.5 L V8	MI	138
14	LMGTE	56	(Austria) AT Racing	(Belarus) Alexander Talkanitsa, Sr. (Italy) Mirko Venturi (Germany) Pierre Kaffer	Ferrari 458 Italia GT2	MI	138
14	LMGTE	56	(Austria) AT Racing	(Belarus) Alexander Talkanitsa, Sr. (Italy) Mirko Venturi (Germany) Pierre Kaffer	Ferrari 4.5 L V8	MI	138
15	**GTC**	**87**	**(Belgium) BMW Sport Trophy Marc VDS**	**(France) Henry Hassid** **(Belgium) Bas Leinders** **(Finland) Markus Palttala**	**BMW Z4 GT3**	MI	**137**
15	**GTC**	**87**	**(Belgium) BMW Sport Trophy Marc VDS**	**(France) Henry Hassid** **(Belgium) Bas Leinders** **(Finland) Markus Palttala**	**BMW 4.4 L V8**	MI	**137**
16	GTC	60	(Denmark) Formula Racing	(Denmark) Jan Magnussen (Denmark) Johnny Laursen (Denmark) Mikkel Mac	Ferrari 458 Italia GT3	MI	136
16	GTC	60	(Denmark) Formula Racing	(Denmark) Jan Magnussen (Denmark) Johnny Laursen (Denmark) Mikkel Mac	Ferrari 4.5 L V8	MI	136
17	LMGTE	80	(Switzerland) Kessel Racing	(Poland) Michał Broniszewski (Italy) Giacomo Piccini	Ferrari 458 Italia GT2	MI	136
17	LMGTE	80	(Switzerland) Kessel Racing	(Poland) Michał Broniszewski (Italy) Giacomo Piccini	Ferrari 4.5 L V8	MI	136
18	GTC	73	(Russia) SMP Racing	(Monaco) Olivier Beretta (Russia) Anton Ladygin (Russia) David Markozov	Ferrari 458 Italia GT3	MI	136
18	GTC	73	(Russia) SMP Racing	(Monaco) Olivier Beretta (Russia) Anton Ladygin (Russia) David Markozov	Ferrari 4.5 L V8	MI	136
19	GTC	71	(Russia) SMP Racing	(Russia) Kirill Ladygin (Italy) Luca Persiani (Russia) Aleksey Basov	Ferrari 458 Italia GT3	MI	136
19	GTC	71	(Russia) SMP Racing	(Russia) Kirill Ladygin (Italy) Luca Persiani (Russia) Aleksey Basov	Ferrari 4.5 L V8	MI	136
20	LMGTE	70	(Italy) AF Corse	(France) Yannick Mollegol (France) François Perrodo (France) Emmanuel Collard	Ferrari 458 Italia GT2	MI	136
20	LMGTE	70	(Italy) AF Corse	(France) Yannick Mollegol (France) François Perrodo (France) Emmanuel Collard	Ferrari 4.5 L V8	MI	136
21	LMGTE	76	(France) IMSA Performance Matmut	(France) Raymond Narac (France) Nicolas Armindo (Denmark) Christina Nielsen	Porsche 997 GT3-RSR	MI	135
21	LMGTE	76	(France) IMSA Performance Matmut	(France) Raymond Narac (France) Nicolas Armindo (Denmark) Christina Nielsen	Porsche 4.0 L Flat-6	MI	135
22	GTC	98	(France) ART Grand Prix	(Estonia) Kevin Korjus (France) Grégoire Demoustier (France) Yann Goudy	McLaren MP4-12C GT3	MI	134
22	GTC	98	(France) ART Grand Prix	(Estonia) Kevin Korjus (France) Grégoire Demoustier (France) Yann Goudy	McLaren 3.8 L Turbo V8	MI	134
23	GTC	78	Team Russia by Barwell	(Russia) Leo Machitski (Russia) Timur Sardarov (United Kingdom) Jonny Cocker	BMW Z4 GT3	MI	134
23	GTC	78	Team Russia by Barwell	(Russia) Leo Machitski (Russia) Timur Sardarov (United Kingdom) Jonny Cocker	BMW 4.4 L V8	MI	134
24	GTC	95	(Italy) AF Corse	(Netherlands) Adrien De Leneer (Monaco) Cédric Sbirrazzuoli	Ferrari 458 Italia GT3	MI	133
24	GTC	95	(Italy) AF Corse	(Netherlands) Adrien De Leneer (Monaco) Cédric Sbirrazzuoli	Ferrari 4.5 L V8	MI	133
25	LMGTE	67	(France) IMSA Performance Matmut	(France) Erik Maris (France) Jean-Marc Merlin (France) Éric Hélary	Porsche 997 GT3-RSR	MI	133
25	LMGTE	67	(France) IMSA Performance Matmut	(France) Erik Maris (France) Jean-Marc Merlin (France) Éric Hélary	Porsche 4.0 L Flat-6	MI	133
26	GTC	63	(Italy) AF Corse	(Denmark) Mads Radsmussen (Portugal) Filipe Barreiros (Portugal) Francisco Guedes	Ferrari 458 Italia GT3	MI	132
26	GTC	63	(Italy) AF Corse	(Denmark) Mads Radsmussen (Portugal) Filipe Barreiros (Portugal) Francisco Guedes	Ferrari 4.5 L V8	MI	132
27	GTC	92	(Italy) Ombra Racing	(Italy) Mario Cordoni (Italy) Marco Zanuttini (Italy) Andrea Montermini	Ferrari 458 Italia GT3	MI	131
27	GTC	92	(Italy) Ombra Racing	(Italy) Mario Cordoni (Italy) Marco Zanuttini (Italy) Andrea Montermini	Ferrari 4.5 L V8	MI	131
28	GTC	59	(France) Team Sofrev-ASP	(France) Christophe Bourret (France) Pascal Gibon (France) Jean-Philippe Belloc	Ferrari 458 Italia GT3	MI	131
28	GTC	59	(France) Team Sofrev-ASP	(France) Christophe Bourret (France) Pascal Gibon (France) Jean-Philippe Belloc	Ferrari 4.5 L V8	MI	131
29	GTC	57	(Russia) SMP Racing	(Russia) Boris Rotenberg (Finland) Mika Salo (Italy) Maurizio Mediani	Ferrari 458 Italia GT3	MI	127
29	GTC	57	(Russia) SMP Racing	(Russia) Boris Rotenberg (Finland) Mika Salo (Italy) Maurizio Mediani	Ferrari 4.5 L V8	MI	127
30	LMGTE	55	(Italy) AF Corse	(United Kingdom) Duncan Cameron (Republic of Ireland) Matt Griffin (Italy) Michele Rugolo	Ferrari 458 Italia GT2	MI	116
30	LMGTE	55	(Italy) AF Corse	(United Kingdom) Duncan Cameron (Republic of Ireland) Matt Griffin (Italy) Michele Rugolo	Ferrari 4.5 L V8	MI	116
DNF	LMP2	28	(United Kingdom) Greaves Motorsport	(United Kingdom) Luciano Bacheta (Russia) Mark Shulzhitskiy	Zytek Z11SN	D	135
DNF	LMP2	28	(United Kingdom) Greaves Motorsport	(United Kingdom) Luciano Bacheta (Russia) Mark Shulzhitskiy	Nissan VK45DE 4.5 L V8	D	135
DNF	LMGTE	58	(France) Team Sofrev-ASP	(France) Anthony Pons (France) Soheil Ayari (France) Fabien Barthez	Ferrari 458 Italia GT2	MI	116
DNF	LMGTE	58	(France) Team Sofrev-ASP	(France) Anthony Pons (France) Soheil Ayari (France) Fabien Barthez	Ferrari 4.5 L V8	MI	116
DNF	GTC	75	(Belgium) Prospeed Competition	(Netherlands) Max van Splunteren (Belgium) Maxime Soulet (France) Gilles Vannelet	Porsche 997 GT3 R	MI	91
DNF	GTC	75	(Belgium) Prospeed Competition	(Netherlands) Max van Splunteren (Belgium) Maxime Soulet (France) Gilles Vannelet	Porsche 4.0 L Flat-6	MI	91
DNF	LMP2	46	(France) Thiriet by TDS Racing	(France) Pierre Thiriet (France) Ludovic Badey (France) Tristan Gommendy	Ligier JS P2	D	62
DNF	LMP2	46	(France) Thiriet by TDS Racing	(France) Pierre Thiriet (France) Ludovic Badey (France) Tristan Gommendy	Nissan VK45DE 4.5 L V8	D	62
DNF	GTC	99	(France) ART Grand Prix	(Mexico) Ricardo González (Switzerland) Karim Ajlani (United Kingdom) Alex Brundle	McLaren MP4-12C GT3	MI	23
DNF	GTC	99	(France) ART Grand Prix	(Mexico) Ricardo González (Switzerland) Karim Ajlani (United Kingdom) Alex Brundle	McLaren 3.8 L Turbo V8	MI	23

European Le Mans Series
Previous race: 4 Hours of Le Castellet	2014 season	Next race: none
