= 2014 European Le Mans Series =

Seasons
- ← 2013 2015 →

The 2014 European Le Mans Series season was the eleventh season of the Automobile Club de l'Ouest's European Le Mans Series. The five-event season began at Silverstone Circuit, in conjunction with the FIA World Endurance Championship, from 18–19 April and ended at Autódromo do Estoril on 19 October.

In the lead LMP2 class, five different teams won the five races that were held during the 2014 season. However, it was Signatech Alpine and their triumvirate of Paul-Loup Chatin, Nelson Panciatici and Oliver Webb that won the respective titles; they won the race at the Red Bull Ring, and ultimately won the championship by four points from the Jota Sport trio Filipe Albuquerque, Simon Dolan and Harry Tincknell, who won at Imola. Third place in the championship went to Le Castellet winners Gary Hirsch and Christian Klien for Newblood by Morand Racing. Other race winners included Pierre Ragues – who was part of the Hirsch-Klien Le Castellet entry – having joined the team mid-season, Sébastien Loeb Racing duo Vincent Capillaire and Jimmy Eriksson were winners at Estoril, while the opening race at Silverstone was won by Thiriet by TDS Racing, with their drivers Ludovic Badey, Tristan Gommendy and Pierre Thiriet.

In the GTE class, SMP Racing and their drivers Andrea Bertolini, Viktor Shaytar and Sergey Zlobin took their respective titles with a final round victory at Estoril while the pre-race championship leaders AF Corse, with drivers Duncan Cameron and Matt Griffin struggled in the race; having led by 21 points going into the race, Cameron and Griffin eventually lost the title by 3.5 points to Bertolini, Shaitar and Zlobin. The teams shared all five wins during the season; SMP Racing won two races, while AF Corse won three, with Cameron and Griffin being joined by Michele Rugolo for the victories; however, as Rugolo missed the Imola event, he finished six points behind them in the championship.

SMP Racing also took the honours in the GTC class, as Olivier Beretta, Devi Markozov and Anton Ladygin finished all five races on the podium – with a victory at Le Castellet – to take class honours by 15.5 points ahead of Formula Racing duo Johnny Laursen and Mikkel Mac, who won with Andrea Piccini at Imola. Third in the class championship went to another SMP Racing entry, with drivers Kirill Ladygin, Aleksey Basov and Luca Persiani, who won the race at the Red Bull Ring. Other race victories went to Team Ukraine at Silverstone with drivers Andrii Kruglyk, Sergey Chukanov and Alessandro Pier Guidi, and BMW Sport Trophy Marc VDS at Estoril, with their trio of Bas Leinders, Markus Palttala and Henry Hassid.

== Regulations ==
The top class continued to be LMP2, where a car of 2–3 drivers had to include at least one silver or bronze-ranking driver. GTE and GTC cars had to include one bronze and silver driver or two bronze drivers. Finally, LMPC was not a part of the 2014 season. Unlike in 2013, tyre warming was allowed in the 2014 season.

== Calendar ==
The provisional calendar was announced during the final round of the 2013 European Le Mans Series at Circuit Paul Ricard. However, to avoid date clashes with the FIA World Endurance Championship, a revised schedule was released, with rounds 2 and 5 being moved back one week. The first round was held alongside the first round of the 2014 FIA World Endurance Championship at Silverstone Circuit. Additionally, all races lasted an hour longer than in 2013, from three hours to four.

Rnd	Race	Circuit	Date
1	4 Hours of Silverstone	Silverstone Circuit, Silverstone, United Kingdom	19 April
2	4 Hours of Imola	Autodromo Enzo e Dino Ferrari, Imola, Italy	18 May
3	4 Hours of Red Bull Ring	Red Bull Ring, Spielberg, Austria	20 July
4	4 Hours of Le Castellet	Circuit Paul Ricard, Le Castellet, France	14 September
5	4 Hours of Estoril	Autódromo do Estoril, Estoril, Portugal	19 October

== Entry list ==
The entry list was announced on February 13. It featured 42 cars, comprising 13 LMP2, 13 GTE and 16 GTC:

- LMP2 featured four Orecas (Boutsen Ginion, Sébastien Loeb, Race Performance and Murphy), three Zyteks (Greaves, Jota and Caterham), three Morgans (Pegasus, Morand and Larbre), two Alpines (Signatech) and a Ligier (Thiriet by TDS).
- GTE featured 8 Ferraris (AF Corse, AT Racing, JMW and Kessel), four Porsches (IMSA, Gulf and Crubilé) and an Aston Martin (Gulf).
- GTC featured 11 Ferraris (AF Corse, SMP, SOFREV-ASP, Formula and Ukraine), two McLarens (ART), a Porsche (Pro GT by Almeras) and a BMW (Barwell).

=== LMP2 ===
Entrant/Team	Car	Engine	Tyre	No.	Drivers	Rounds
(France) Sébastien Loeb Racing	Oreca 03	Nissan VK45DE 4.5 L V8	M	24	(France) Vincent Capillaire	1–2, 4–5
(France) Sébastien Loeb Racing	Oreca 03	Nissan VK45DE 4.5 L V8	M	24	(Czech Republic) Jan Charouz	1–2
(France) Sébastien Loeb Racing	Oreca 03	Nissan VK45DE 4.5 L V8	M	24	(France) Arthur Pic	4
(France) Sébastien Loeb Racing	Oreca 03	Nissan VK45DE 4.5 L V8	M	24	(Italy) Andrea Roda	4
(France) Sébastien Loeb Racing	Oreca 03	Nissan VK45DE 4.5 L V8	M	24	(Sweden) Jimmy Eriksson	5
(United Kingdom) Greaves Motorsport	Zytek Z11SN	Nissan VK45DE 4.5 L V8	D	28	(United Kingdom) James Littlejohn	1
(United Kingdom) Greaves Motorsport	Zytek Z11SN	Nissan VK45DE 4.5 L V8	D	28	(United Kingdom) James Walker	1
(United Kingdom) Greaves Motorsport	Zytek Z11SN	Nissan VK45DE 4.5 L V8	D	28	(United Kingdom) Anthony Wells	1
(United Kingdom) Greaves Motorsport	Zytek Z11SN	Nissan VK45DE 4.5 L V8	D	28	(United Kingdom) Luciano Bacheta	3–5
(United Kingdom) Greaves Motorsport	Zytek Z11SN	Nissan VK45DE 4.5 L V8	D	28	(Russia) Mark Shulzhitskiy	3–5
(United Kingdom) Greaves Motorsport	Zytek Z11SN	Nissan VK45DE 4.5 L V8	D	41	(United States) Matt McMurry	All
(United Kingdom) Greaves Motorsport	Zytek Z11SN	Nissan VK45DE 4.5 L V8	D	41	(United Kingdom) Tom Kimber-Smith	1–3
(United Kingdom) Greaves Motorsport	Zytek Z11SN	Nissan VK45DE 4.5 L V8	D	41	(United States) Chris Dyson	1
(United Kingdom) Greaves Motorsport	Zytek Z11SN	Nissan VK45DE 4.5 L V8	D	41	(United States) Mark Patterson	3
(United Kingdom) Greaves Motorsport	Zytek Z11SN	Nissan VK45DE 4.5 L V8	D	41	(United Kingdom) Johnny Mowlem	4
(United Kingdom) Greaves Motorsport	Zytek Z11SN	Nissan VK45DE 4.5 L V8	D	41	(Portugal) Miguel Faísca	5
(United Kingdom) Greaves Motorsport	Zytek Z11SN	Nissan VK45DE 4.5 L V8	D	41	(United Kingdom) James Fletcher	5
(Germany) Pegasus Racing	Morgan LMP2	Nissan VK45DE 4.5 L V8	D	29	(United Kingdom) Jonathan Coleman	All
(Germany) Pegasus Racing	Morgan LMP2	Nissan VK45DE 4.5 L V8	D	29	(Switzerland) Nicolas Leutwiler	All
(Germany) Pegasus Racing	Morgan LMP2	Nissan VK45DE 4.5 L V8	D	29	(France) Julien Schell	All
(Switzerland) Race Performance	Oreca 03	Judd HK 3.6 L V8	D	34	(Switzerland) Michel Frey	All
(Switzerland) Race Performance	Oreca 03	Judd HK 3.6 L V8	D	34	(France) Franck Mailleux	All
(Switzerland) Race Performance	Oreca 03	Judd HK 3.6 L V8	D	34	(Switzerland) Patric Niederhauser	5
(France) Signatech Alpine	Alpine A450	Nissan VK45DE 4.5 L V8	M D	36	(France) Paul-Loup Chatin	All
(France) Signatech Alpine	Alpine A450	Nissan VK45DE 4.5 L V8	M D	36	(France) Nelson Panciatici	All
(France) Signatech Alpine	Alpine A450	Nissan VK45DE 4.5 L V8	M D	36	(United Kingdom) Oliver Webb	All
(United Kingdom) Jota Sport	Zytek Z11SN	Nissan VK45DE 4.5 L V8	D	38	(Portugal) Filipe Albuquerque	All
(United Kingdom) Jota Sport	Zytek Z11SN	Nissan VK45DE 4.5 L V8	D	38	(United Kingdom) Simon Dolan	All
(United Kingdom) Jota Sport	Zytek Z11SN	Nissan VK45DE 4.5 L V8	D	38	(United Kingdom) Harry Tincknell	All
(Switzerland) Newblood by Morand Racing	Morgan LMP2	Judd HK 3.6 L V8	D	43	(Switzerland) Gary Hirsch	All
(Switzerland) Newblood by Morand Racing	Morgan LMP2	Judd HK 3.6 L V8	D	43	(Austria) Christian Klien	All
(Switzerland) Newblood by Morand Racing	Morgan LMP2	Judd HK 3.6 L V8	D	43	(France) Romain Brandela	1–2
(Switzerland) Newblood by Morand Racing	Morgan LMP2	Judd HK 3.6 L V8	D	43	(France) Pierre Ragues	3–5
(France) Thiriet by TDS Racing	Morgan LMP2 (Note: Rounds 1–2.); Ligier JS P2 (Note: Rounds 3–5.)	Nissan VK45DE 4.5 L V8	D	46	(France) Ludovic Badey	All
(France) Thiriet by TDS Racing	Morgan LMP2; Ligier JS P2	Nissan VK45DE 4.5 L V8	D	46	(France) Tristan Gommendy	All
(France) Thiriet by TDS Racing	Morgan LMP2; Ligier JS P2	Nissan VK45DE 4.5 L V8	D	46	(France) Pierre Thiriet	All
(Republic of Ireland) Murphy Prototypes	Oreca 03	Nissan VK45DE 4.5 L V8	D	48	(Venezuela) Rodolfo González	1–2, 4
(Republic of Ireland) Murphy Prototypes	Oreca 03	Nissan VK45DE 4.5 L V8	D	48	(India) Karun Chandhok	1–2
(Republic of Ireland) Murphy Prototypes	Oreca 03	Nissan VK45DE 4.5 L V8	D	48	(United Kingdom) Alex Kapadia	1
(Republic of Ireland) Murphy Prototypes	Oreca 03	Nissan VK45DE 4.5 L V8	D	48	(France) Nathanaël Berthon	2, 4
(Republic of Ireland) Murphy Prototypes	Oreca 03	Nissan VK45DE 4.5 L V8	D	48	(Brazil) Pipo Derani	4–5
(Republic of Ireland) Murphy Prototypes	Oreca 03	Nissan VK45DE 4.5 L V8	D	48	(United Kingdom) James Littlejohn	5
(Republic of Ireland) Murphy Prototypes	Oreca 03	Nissan VK45DE 4.5 L V8	D	48	(United Kingdom) Anthony Wells	5
(France) Larbre Compétition	Morgan LMP2	Judd HK 3.6 L V8	M	50	(Japan) Keiko Ihara	1
(France) Larbre Compétition	Morgan LMP2	Judd HK 3.6 L V8	M	50	(Colombia) Gustavo Yacamán	1

=== LM GTE ===
Entrant/Team	Car	Engine	Tyre	No.	Drivers	Rounds
(Italy) AF Corse	Ferrari 458 Italia GT2	Ferrari F136 4.5 L V8	M	54	(Italy) Marco Cioci	All
(Italy) AF Corse	Ferrari 458 Italia GT2	Ferrari F136 4.5 L V8	M	54	(United Kingdom) Michael Lyons	All
(Italy) AF Corse	Ferrari 458 Italia GT2	Ferrari F136 4.5 L V8	M	54	(Italy) Piergiuseppe Perazzini	All
(Italy) AF Corse	Ferrari 458 Italia GT2	Ferrari F136 4.5 L V8	M	55	(United Kingdom) Duncan Cameron	All
(Italy) AF Corse	Ferrari 458 Italia GT2	Ferrari F136 4.5 L V8	M	55	(Republic of Ireland) Matt Griffin	All
(Italy) AF Corse	Ferrari 458 Italia GT2	Ferrari F136 4.5 L V8	M	55	(Italy) Michele Rugolo	1, 3–5
(Italy) AF Corse	Ferrari 458 Italia GT2	Ferrari F136 4.5 L V8	M	55	(Italy) Mirko Venturi	2
(Italy) AF Corse	Ferrari 458 Italia GT2	Ferrari F136 4.5 L V8	M	65	(Italy) Lorenzo Casè	2
(Italy) AF Corse	Ferrari 458 Italia GT2	Ferrari F136 4.5 L V8	M	65	(Italy) Raffaele Giammaria	2
(Italy) AF Corse	Ferrari 458 Italia GT2	Ferrari F136 4.5 L V8	M	65	(United States) Peter Mann	2
(Italy) AF Corse	Ferrari 458 Italia GT2	Ferrari F136 4.5 L V8	M	70	(France) Emmanuel Collard	3–5
(Italy) AF Corse	Ferrari 458 Italia GT2	Ferrari F136 4.5 L V8	M	70	(France) Yannick Mallegol	3–5
(Italy) AF Corse	Ferrari 458 Italia GT2	Ferrari F136 4.5 L V8	M	70	(France) François Perrodo	3–5
(Austria) AT Racing	Ferrari 458 Italia GT2	Ferrari F136 4.5 L V8	M	56	(Germany) Pierre Kaffer	All
(Austria) AT Racing	Ferrari 458 Italia GT2	Ferrari F136 4.5 L V8	M	56	(Belarus) Alexander Talkanitsa, Sr.	All
(Austria) AT Racing	Ferrari 458 Italia GT2	Ferrari F136 4.5 L V8	M	56	(Belarus) Alexander Talkanitsa, Jr.	1–3, 5
(Austria) AT Racing	Ferrari 458 Italia GT2	Ferrari F136 4.5 L V8	M	56	(Italy) Mirko Venturi	4
(France) Team Sofrev ASP	Ferrari 458 Italia GT2	Ferrari F136 4.5 L V8	M	58	(France) Soheil Ayari	All
(France) Team Sofrev ASP	Ferrari 458 Italia GT2	Ferrari F136 4.5 L V8	M	58	(France) Fabien Barthez	All
(France) Team Sofrev ASP	Ferrari 458 Italia GT2	Ferrari F136 4.5 L V8	M	58	(France) Anthony Pons	All
(United Kingdom) JMW Motorsport	Ferrari 458 Italia GT2	Ferrari F136 4.5 L V8	M	66	(United Kingdom) Daniel McKenzie	All
(United Kingdom) JMW Motorsport	Ferrari 458 Italia GT2	Ferrari F136 4.5 L V8	M	66	(United Kingdom) George Richardson	All
(United Kingdom) JMW Motorsport	Ferrari 458 Italia GT2	Ferrari F136 4.5 L V8	M	66	(Italy) Daniel Zampieri	1–2, 5
(United Kingdom) JMW Motorsport	Ferrari 458 Italia GT2	Ferrari F136 4.5 L V8	M	66	(United Kingdom) Rob Bell	3
(United Kingdom) JMW Motorsport	Ferrari 458 Italia GT2	Ferrari F136 4.5 L V8	M	66	(United Kingdom) James Walker	4
(France) IMSA Performance Matmut	Porsche 997 GT3-RSR	Porsche M97/74 4.0 L Flat-6	M	67	(France) Éric Hélary	All
(France) IMSA Performance Matmut	Porsche 997 GT3-RSR	Porsche M97/74 4.0 L Flat-6	M	67	(France) Erik Maris	All
(France) IMSA Performance Matmut	Porsche 997 GT3-RSR	Porsche M97/74 4.0 L Flat-6	M	67	(France) Jean-Marc Merlin	All
(France) IMSA Performance Matmut	Porsche 997 GT3-RSR	Porsche M97/74 4.0 L Flat-6	M	76	(France) Nicolas Armindo	All
(France) IMSA Performance Matmut	Porsche 997 GT3-RSR	Porsche M97/74 4.0 L Flat-6	M	76	(France) Raymond Narac	All
(France) IMSA Performance Matmut	Porsche 997 GT3-RSR	Porsche M97/74 4.0 L Flat-6	M	76	(France) David Hallyday	1–2
(France) IMSA Performance Matmut	Porsche 997 GT3-RSR	Porsche M97/74 4.0 L Flat-6	M	76	(Denmark) Christina Nielsen	3–5
(Russia) SMP Racing	Ferrari 458 Italia GT2	Ferrari F136 4.5 L V8	M	72	(Italy) Andrea Bertolini	All
(Russia) SMP Racing	Ferrari 458 Italia GT2	Ferrari F136 4.5 L V8	M	72	(Russia) Viktor Shaytar	All
(Russia) SMP Racing	Ferrari 458 Italia GT2	Ferrari F136 4.5 L V8	M	72	(Russia) Sergey Zlobin	All
(Germany) Proton Competition	Porsche 997 GT3-RSR	Porsche M97/74 4.0 L Flat-6	M	77	(Austria) Horst Felbermayr Jr.	3
(Germany) Proton Competition	Porsche 997 GT3-RSR	Porsche M97/74 4.0 L Flat-6	M	77	(Austria) Horst Felbermayr Sr.	3
(Germany) Proton Competition	Porsche 997 GT3-RSR	Porsche M97/74 4.0 L Flat-6	M	77	(Austria) Richard Lietz	3
(Switzerland) Kessel Racing	Ferrari 458 Italia GT2	Ferrari F136 4.5 L V8	M	80	(Poland) Michał Broniszewski	1–2, 4–5
(Switzerland) Kessel Racing	Ferrari 458 Italia GT2	Ferrari F136 4.5 L V8	M	80	(Italy) Giacomo Piccini	1–2, 4–5
(Switzerland) Kessel Racing	Ferrari 458 Italia GT2	Ferrari F136 4.5 L V8	M	81	(Italy) Matteo Cressoni	1–4
(Switzerland) Kessel Racing	Ferrari 458 Italia GT2	Ferrari F136 4.5 L V8	M	81	(Italy) Thomas Kemenater	1–4
(France) Crubilé Sport	Porsche 997 GT3-RSR	Porsche M97/74 4.0 L Flat-6	M	82	(France) Emmanuel Collard	1–2
(France) Crubilé Sport	Porsche 997 GT3-RSR	Porsche M97/74 4.0 L Flat-6	M	82	(France) Sébastien Crubilé	1–2
(France) Crubilé Sport	Porsche 997 GT3-RSR	Porsche M97/74 4.0 L Flat-6	M	82	(France) François Perrodo	1–2
(United Kingdom) Gulf Racing UK	Aston Martin V8 Vantage GTE	Aston Martin AM05 4.5 L V8	M	85	(United Kingdom) Daniel Brown	All
(United Kingdom) Gulf Racing UK	Aston Martin V8 Vantage GTE	Aston Martin AM05 4.5 L V8	M	85	(Germany) Roald Goethe	All
(United Kingdom) Gulf Racing UK	Aston Martin V8 Vantage GTE	Aston Martin AM05 4.5 L V8	M	85	(United Kingdom) Stuart Hall	All
(United Kingdom) Gulf Racing UK	Porsche 911 GT3 RSR (Note: Rounds 1–3.); Porsche 911 RSR (Note: Rounds 4–5.)	Porsche 4.0 L Flat-6	M	86	(United Kingdom) Adam Carroll	All
(United Kingdom) Gulf Racing UK	Porsche 911 GT3 RSR; Porsche 911 RSR	Porsche 4.0 L Flat-6	M	86	(United Kingdom) Michael Wainwright	All
(United Kingdom) Gulf Racing UK	Porsche 911 GT3 RSR; Porsche 911 RSR	Porsche 4.0 L Flat-6	M	86	(United Kingdom) Ben Barker	1–2, 4–5
(United Kingdom) Gulf Racing UK	Porsche 911 GT3 RSR; Porsche 911 RSR	Porsche 4.0 L Flat-6	M	86	(United Kingdom) Michael Meadows	3

=== GTC ===
Entrant/Team	Car	Engine	Tyre	No.	Drivers	Rounds
(France) Sébastien Loeb Racing	Audi R8 LMS ultra	Audi BUJ 5.2 L V10	M	51	(France) Henry Hassid	1
(France) Sébastien Loeb Racing	Audi R8 LMS ultra	Audi BUJ 5.2 L V10	M	51	(France) Olivier Lombard	1
(France) Sébastien Loeb Racing	Audi R8 LMS ultra	Audi BUJ 5.2 L V10	M	51	(France) Mike Parisy	1
(Russia) SMP Racing	Ferrari 458 Italia GT3	Ferrari F136 4.5 L V8	M	57	(Italy) Maurizio Mediani	2–5
(Russia) SMP Racing	Ferrari 458 Italia GT3	Ferrari F136 4.5 L V8	M	57	(Russia) Boris Rotenberg	2–5
(Russia) SMP Racing	Ferrari 458 Italia GT3	Ferrari F136 4.5 L V8	M	57	(Finland) Mika Salo	2–5
(Russia) SMP Racing	Ferrari 458 Italia GT3	Ferrari F136 4.5 L V8	M	71	(Russia) Aleksey Basov	All
(Russia) SMP Racing	Ferrari 458 Italia GT3	Ferrari F136 4.5 L V8	M	71	(Russia) Kirill Ladygin	All
(Russia) SMP Racing	Ferrari 458 Italia GT3	Ferrari F136 4.5 L V8	M	71	(Italy) Luca Persiani	All
(Russia) SMP Racing	Ferrari 458 Italia GT3	Ferrari F136 4.5 L V8	M	73	(Monaco) Olivier Beretta	All
(Russia) SMP Racing	Ferrari 458 Italia GT3	Ferrari F136 4.5 L V8	M	73	(Russia) Anton Ladygin	All
(Russia) SMP Racing	Ferrari 458 Italia GT3	Ferrari F136 4.5 L V8	M	73	(Russia) Devi Markozov	All
(France) Team Sofrev ASP	Ferrari 458 Italia GT3	Ferrari F136 4.5 L V8	M	59	(France) Jean-Philippe Belloc	All
(France) Team Sofrev ASP	Ferrari 458 Italia GT3	Ferrari F136 4.5 L V8	M	59	(France) Christophe Bourret	All
(France) Team Sofrev ASP	Ferrari 458 Italia GT3	Ferrari F136 4.5 L V8	M	59	(France) Pascal Gibon	1–2, 4–5
(France) Team Sofrev ASP	Ferrari 458 Italia GT3	Ferrari F136 4.5 L V8	M	59	(France) Jean-Luc Beaubelique	3
(Denmark) Formula Racing	Ferrari 458 Italia GT3	Ferrari F136 4.5 L V8	M	60	(Denmark) Johnny Laursen	All
(Denmark) Formula Racing	Ferrari 458 Italia GT3	Ferrari F136 4.5 L V8	M	60	(Denmark) Mikkel Mac	All
(Denmark) Formula Racing	Ferrari 458 Italia GT3	Ferrari F136 4.5 L V8	M	60	(Denmark) Jan Magnussen	1, 3–5
(Denmark) Formula Racing	Ferrari 458 Italia GT3	Ferrari F136 4.5 L V8	M	60	(Italy) Andrea Piccini	2
(Italy) AF Corse	Ferrari 458 Italia GT3	Ferrari F136 4.5 L V8	M	62	(France) Jean-Marc Bachelier	1–2
(Italy) AF Corse	Ferrari 458 Italia GT3	Ferrari F136 4.5 L V8	M	62	(United States) Howard Blank	1–2
(Italy) AF Corse	Ferrari 458 Italia GT3	Ferrari F136 4.5 L V8	M	62	(France) Yannick Mallegol	1–2
(Italy) AF Corse	Ferrari 458 Italia GT3	Ferrari F136 4.5 L V8	M	63	(Denmark) Mads Rasmussen	All
(Italy) AF Corse	Ferrari 458 Italia GT3	Ferrari F136 4.5 L V8	M	63	(Denmark) Dennis Lind	1
(Italy) AF Corse	Ferrari 458 Italia GT3	Ferrari F136 4.5 L V8	M	63	(Russia) Ilya Melnikov	2–3
(Italy) AF Corse	Ferrari 458 Italia GT3	Ferrari F136 4.5 L V8	M	63	(Portugal) Filipe Barreiros	4–5
(Italy) AF Corse	Ferrari 458 Italia GT3	Ferrari F136 4.5 L V8	M	63	(Portugal) Francisco Guedes	5
(Italy) AF Corse	Ferrari 458 Italia GT3	Ferrari F136 4.5 L V8	M	94	(Italy) Francesco Castellacci	2, 4
(Italy) AF Corse	Ferrari 458 Italia GT3	Ferrari F136 4.5 L V8	M	94	(Switzerland) Thomas Flohr	2, 4
(Italy) AF Corse	Ferrari 458 Italia GT3	Ferrari F136 4.5 L V8	M	94	(Italy) Andrea Rizzoli	4
(Italy) AF Corse	Ferrari 458 Italia GT3	Ferrari F136 4.5 L V8	M	95	(Belgium) Adrien De Leener	All
(Italy) AF Corse	Ferrari 458 Italia GT3	Ferrari F136 4.5 L V8	M	95	(Monaco) Cédric Sbirrazzuoli	All
(Belgium) Prospeed Competition	Porsche 997 GT3-R	Porsche M97/79 4.0 L Flat-6	M	75	(France) Gilles Vannelet	All
(Belgium) Prospeed Competition	Porsche 997 GT3-R	Porsche M97/79 4.0 L Flat-6	M	75	(Belgium) Maxime Soulet	1–2, 5
(Belgium) Prospeed Competition	Porsche 997 GT3-R	Porsche M97/79 4.0 L Flat-6	M	75	(Netherlands) Paul van Splunteren	1–2
(Belgium) Prospeed Competition	Porsche 997 GT3-R	Porsche M97/79 4.0 L Flat-6	M	75	(Netherlands) Max van Splunteren	3–5
(Belgium) Prospeed Competition	Porsche 997 GT3-R	Porsche M97/79 4.0 L Flat-6	M	75	(France) Mike Parisy	3–4
Team Russia by Barwell	BMW Z4 GT3	BMW P65B44 4.4 L V8	M	78	(United Kingdom) Jonny Cocker	All
Team Russia by Barwell	BMW Z4 GT3	BMW P65B44 4.4 L V8	M	78	(Russia) Leo Machitski	All
Team Russia by Barwell	BMW Z4 GT3	BMW P65B44 4.4 L V8	M	78	(Russia) Timur Sardarov	All
(Belgium) BMW Sport Trophy Marc VDS	BMW Z4 GT3	BMW P65B44 4.4 L V8	M	87	(France) Henry Hassid	5
(Belgium) BMW Sport Trophy Marc VDS	BMW Z4 GT3	BMW P65B44 4.4 L V8	M	87	(Belgium) Bas Leinders	5
(Belgium) BMW Sport Trophy Marc VDS	BMW Z4 GT3	BMW P65B44 4.4 L V8	M	87	(Finland) Markus Palttala	5
(Italy) Ombra Racing	Ferrari 458 Italia GT3	Ferrari F136 4.5 L V8	M	92	(Italy) Mario Cordoni	4–5
(Italy) Ombra Racing	Ferrari 458 Italia GT3	Ferrari F136 4.5 L V8	M	92	(Italy) Andrea Montermini	5
(Italy) Ombra Racing	Ferrari 458 Italia GT3	Ferrari F136 4.5 L V8	M	92	(Italy) Marco Zanuttini	4–5
(France) Pro GT by Alméras	Porsche 997 GT3-R	Porsche M97/79 4.0 L Flat-6	M	93	(France) Franck Perera	1–4
(France) Pro GT by Alméras	Porsche 997 GT3-R	Porsche M97/79 4.0 L Flat-6	M	93	(France) Eric Dermont	1–2, 4
(France) Pro GT by Alméras	Porsche 997 GT3-R	Porsche M97/79 4.0 L Flat-6	M	93	(France) Lucas Lasserre	1–2, 4
(France) Pro GT by Alméras	Porsche 997 GT3-R	Porsche M97/79 4.0 L Flat-6	M	93	(France) Henry Hassid	3
(France) Pro GT by Alméras	Porsche 997 GT3-R	Porsche M97/79 4.0 L Flat-6	M	93	(France) Matthieu Vaxivière	3
Team Ukraine	Ferrari 458 Italia GT3	Ferrari F136 4.5 L V8	M	96	(Ukraine) Sergey Chukanov	1
Team Ukraine	Ferrari 458 Italia GT3	Ferrari F136 4.5 L V8	M	96	(Ukraine) Andrii Kruglyk	1
Team Ukraine	Ferrari 458 Italia GT3	Ferrari F136 4.5 L V8	M	96	(Italy) Alessandro Pier Guidi	1
(France) ART Grand Prix	McLaren MP4-12C GT3	McLaren M838T 3.8 L Turbo V8	M	98	(France) Grégoire Demoustier	All
(France) ART Grand Prix	McLaren MP4-12C GT3	McLaren M838T 3.8 L Turbo V8	M	98	(France) Yann Goudy	All
(France) ART Grand Prix	McLaren MP4-12C GT3	McLaren M838T 3.8 L Turbo V8	M	98	(Estonia) Kevin Korjus	All
(France) ART Grand Prix	McLaren MP4-12C GT3	McLaren M838T 3.8 L Turbo V8	M	99	(Switzerland) Karim Ajlani	All
(France) ART Grand Prix	McLaren MP4-12C GT3	McLaren M838T 3.8 L Turbo V8	M	99	(United Kingdom) Alex Brundle	All
(France) ART Grand Prix	McLaren MP4-12C GT3	McLaren M838T 3.8 L Turbo V8	M	99	(Mexico) Ricardo González	All

== Season results ==
Rnd.	Circuit	LMP2 Winning Team	LMGTE Winning Team	GTC Winning Team	Results
Rnd.	Circuit	LMP2 Winning Drivers	LMGTE Winning Drivers	GTC Winning Drivers	Results
1	Silverstone	(France) No. 46 Thiriet by TDS Racing	(Italy) No. 55 AF Corse	No. 96 Team Ukraine	Report
1	Silverstone	(France) Ludovic Badey (France) Tristan Gommendy (France) Pierre Thiriet	(United Kingdom) Duncan Cameron (Republic of Ireland) Matt Griffin (Italy) Michele Rugolo	(Ukraine) Sergey Chukanov (Ukraine) Andrii Kruglyk (Italy) Alessandro Pier Guidi	Report
2	Imola	(United Kingdom) No. 38 Jota Sport	(Russia) No. 72 SMP Racing	(Denmark) No. 60 Formula Racing	Report
2	Imola	(Portugal) Filipe Albuquerque (United Kingdom) Simon Dolan (United Kingdom) Harry Tincknell	(Italy) Andrea Bertolini (Russia) Viktor Shaytar (Russia) Sergey Zlobin	(Denmark) Johnny Laursen (Denmark) Mikkel Mac (Italy) Andrea Piccini	Report
3	Red Bull Ring	(France) No. 36 Signatech Alpine	(Italy) No. 55 AF Corse	(Russia) No. 71 SMP Racing	Report
3	Red Bull Ring	(France) Paul-Loup Chatin (France) Nelson Panciatici (United Kingdom) Oliver Webb	(United Kingdom) Duncan Cameron (Republic of Ireland) Matt Griffin (Italy) Michele Rugolo	(Russia) Aleksey Basov (Russia) Kirill Ladygin (Italy) Luca Persiani	Report
4	Paul Ricard	(Switzerland) No. 43 Newblood by Morand Racing	(Italy) No. 55 AF Corse	(Russia) No. 73 SMP Racing	Report
4	Paul Ricard	(Switzerland) Gary Hirsch (Austria) Christian Klien (France) Pierre Ragues	(United Kingdom) Duncan Cameron (Republic of Ireland) Matt Griffin (Italy) Michele Rugolo	(Monaco) Olivier Beretta (Russia) Anton Ladygin (Russia) Devi Markozov	Report
5	Estoril	(France) No. 24 Sébastien Loeb Racing	(Russia) No. 72 SMP Racing	(Belgium) No. 87 BMW Sport Trophy Marc VDS	Report
5	Estoril	(France) Vincent Capillaire (Sweden) Jimmy Eriksson	(Italy) Andrea Bertolini (Russia) Viktor Shaytar (Russia) Sergey Zlobin	(France) Henry Hassid (Belgium) Bas Leinders (Finland) Markus Palttala	Report

== Championship Standings ==
Points System

Position	1st	2nd	3rd	4th	5th	6th	7th	8th	9th	10th	Other Classified
Points	25	18	15	12	10	8	6	4	2	1	0.5

== Drivers' Championships ==
=== LMP2 ===
Pos	Driver	Team	SIL (United Kingdom)	IMO (Italy)	RBR (Austria)	LEC (France)	EST (Portugal)	Total
1	(France) Paul-Loup Chatin	(France) Signatech Alpine	5	3	1	2	5	78
1	(France) Nelson Panciatici	(France) Signatech Alpine	5	3	1	2	5	78
1	(United Kingdom) Oliver Webb	(France) Signatech Alpine	5	3	1	2	5	78
2	(Portugal) Filipe Albuquerque	(United Kingdom) Jota Sport	Ret	1	2	4	3	74
2	(United Kingdom) Simon Dolan	(United Kingdom) Jota Sport	Ret	1	2	4	3	74
2	(United Kingdom) Harry Tincknell	(United Kingdom) Jota Sport	Ret	1	2	4	3	74
3	(Switzerland) Gary Hirsch	(Switzerland) Newblood by Morand Racing	3	Ret	5	1	2	68
3	(Austria) Christian Klien	(Switzerland) Newblood by Morand Racing	3	Ret	5	1	2	68
4	(France) Vincent Capillaire	(France) Sébastien Loeb Racing	7	2		6	1	57
5	(Switzerland) Michel Frey	(Switzerland) Race Performance	2	7	3	7	4	57
5	(France) Franck Mailleux	(Switzerland) Race Performance	2	7	3	7	4	57
6	(France) Pierre Ragues	(Switzerland) Newblood by Morand Racing			5	1	2	53
7	(United States) Matt McMurry	(United Kingdom) Greaves Motorsport	4	4	6	Ret	7	38
8	(France) Ludovic Badey	(France) Thiriet by TDS Racing	1	5	Ret	Ret	Ret	35
8	(France) Tristan Gommendy	(France) Thiriet by TDS Racing	1	5	Ret	Ret	Ret	35
8	(France) Pierre Thiriet	(France) Thiriet by TDS Racing	1	5	Ret	Ret	Ret	35
9	(United Kingdom) Tom Kimber-Smith	(United Kingdom) Greaves Motorsport	4	4	6			32
10	(Sweden) Jimmy Eriksson	(France) Sébastien Loeb Racing					1	25
11	(Czech Republic) Jan Charouz	(France) Sébastien Loeb Racing	7	2				24
12	(Brazil) Pipo Derani	(Republic of Ireland) Murphy Prototypes				3	6	24
13	(United Kingdom) Luciano Bacheta	(United Kingdom) Greaves Motorsport			4	5	Ret	22
13	(Russia) Mark Shulzhitskiy	(United Kingdom) Greaves Motorsport			4	5	Ret	22
14	(Venezuela) Rodolfo González	(Republic of Ireland) Murphy Prototypes	8	Ret		3		20
15	(United Kingdom) Jonathan Coleman	(Germany) Pegasus Racing	Ret	6	7	Ret	8	18
15	(Switzerland) Nicolas Leutwiler	(Germany) Pegasus Racing	Ret	6	7	Ret	8	18
15	(France) Julien Schell	(Germany) Pegasus Racing	Ret	6	7	Ret	8	18
16	(France) Nathanaël Berthon	(Republic of Ireland) Murphy Prototypes		Ret		3		16
17	(United Kingdom) James Littlejohn	(United Kingdom) Greaves Motorsport	6					16
17	(United Kingdom) James Littlejohn	(Republic of Ireland) Murphy Prototypes					6	16
17	(United Kingdom) Anthony Wells	(United Kingdom) Greaves Motorsport	6					16
17	(United Kingdom) Anthony Wells	(Republic of Ireland) Murphy Prototypes					6	16
18	(France) Romain Brandela	(Switzerland) Newblood by Morand Racing	3	Ret				15
19	(United States) Chris Dyson	(United Kingdom) Greaves Motorsport	4					12
20	(Switzerland) Patric Niederhauser	(Switzerland) Race Performance					4	12
21	(United Kingdom) James Walker	(United Kingdom) Greaves Motorsport	6					8
22	(United States) Mark Patterson	(United Kingdom) Greaves Motorsport			6			8
23	(France) Arthur Pic	(France) Sébastien Loeb Racing				6		8
23	(Italy) Andrea Roda	(France) Sébastien Loeb Racing				6		8
24	(Portugal) Miguel Faísca	(United Kingdom) Greaves Motorsport					7	6
24	(United Kingdom) James Fletcher	(United Kingdom) Greaves Motorsport					7	6
25	(India) Karun Chandhok	(Republic of Ireland) Murphy Prototypes	8	Ret				4
25	(United Kingdom) Alex Kapadia	(Republic of Ireland) Murphy Prototypes	8					4
26	(Japan) Keiko Ihara	(France) Larbre Compétition	9					2
26	(Colombia) Gustavo Yacamán	(France) Larbre Compétition	9					2
27	(United Kingdom) Johnny Mowlem	(United Kingdom) Greaves Motorsport				Ret		0

=== LM GTE ===
Pos	Driver	Team	SIL (United Kingdom)	IMO (Italy)	RBR (Austria)	LEC (France)	EST (Portugal)	Total
1	(Italy) Andrea Bertolini	(Russia) SMP Racing	2	1	6	7	1	85
1	(Russia) Viktor Shaytar	(Russia) SMP Racing	2	1	6	7	1	85
1	(Russia) Sergey Zlobin	(Russia) SMP Racing	2	1	6	7	1	85
2	(United Kingdom) Duncan Cameron	(Italy) AF Corse	1	7	1	1	11	81.5
2	(Republic of Ireland) Matt Griffin	(Italy) AF Corse	1	7	1	1	11	81.5
3	(Italy) Michele Rugolo	(Italy) AF Corse	1		1	1	11	75.5
4	(United Kingdom) Daniel McKenzie	(United Kingdom) JMW Motorsport	5	3	3	3	3	70
4	(United Kingdom) George Richardson	(United Kingdom) JMW Motorsport	5	3	3	3	3	70
5	(Germany) Pierre Kaffer	(Austria) AT Racing	4	4	4	2	6	62
5	(Belarus) Alexander Talkanitsa, Sr.	(Austria) AT Racing	4	4	4	2	6	62
6	(Italy) Marco Cioci	(Italy) AF Corse	6	Ret	5	4	2	48
6	(United Kingdom) Michael Lyons	(Italy) AF Corse	6	Ret	5	4	2	48
6	(Italy) Piergiuseppe Perazzini	(Italy) AF Corse	6	Ret	5	4	2	48
7	(Belarus) Alexander Talkanitsa, Jr.	(Austria) AT Racing	4	4	4		6	44
8	(Italy) Daniel Zampieri	(United Kingdom) JMW Motorsport	5	3			3	40
9	(Italy) Matteo Cressoni	(Switzerland) Kessel Racing	13	2	2	9		39.5
9	(Italy) Thomas Kemenater	(Switzerland) Kessel Racing	13	2	2	9		39.5
10	(France) Nicolas Armindo	(France) IMSA Performance Matmut	3	6	Ret	8	9	29
10	(France) Raymond Narac	(France) IMSA Performance Matmut	3	6	Ret	8	9	29
11	(United Kingdom) Adam Carroll	(United Kingdom) Gulf Racing UK	9	8	9	6	4	28
11	(United Kingdom) Michael Wainwright	(United Kingdom) Gulf Racing UK	9	8	9	6	4	28
12	(United Kingdom) Ben Barker	(United Kingdom) Gulf Racing UK	9	8		6	4	26
13	(Italy) Mirko Venturi	(Italy) AF Corse		7				24
13	(Italy) Mirko Venturi	(Austria) AT Racing				2		24
14	(France) David Hallyday	(France) IMSA Performance Matmut	3	6				23
15	(United Kingdom) Daniel Brown	(United Kingdom) Gulf Racing UK	11	9	7	10	5	20.5
15	(Germany) Roald Goethe	(United Kingdom) Gulf Racing UK	11	9	7	10	5	20.5
15	(United Kingdom) Stuart Hall	(United Kingdom) Gulf Racing UK	11	9	7	10	5	20.5

=== GTC ===
Pos	Driver	Team	SIL (United Kingdom)	IMO (Italy)	RBR (Austria)	LEC (France)	EST (Portugal)	Total
1	(Monaco) Olivier Beretta	(Russia) SMP Racing	2	2	2	1	3	94
1	(Russia) Anton Ladygin	(Russia) SMP Racing	2	2	2	1	3	94
1	(Russia) Devi Markozov	(Russia) SMP Racing	2	2	2	1	3	94
2	(Denmark) Johnny Laursen	(Denmark) Formula Racing	3	1	11	2	2	78.5
2	(Denmark) Mikkel Mac	(Denmark) Formula Racing	3	1	11	2	2	78.5
3	(Russia) Aleksey Basov	(Russia) SMP Racing	DNS	3	1	4	4	67
3	(Russia) Kirill Ladygin	(Russia) SMP Racing	DNS	3	1	4	4	67
3	(Italy) Luca Persiani	(Russia) SMP Racing	DNS	3	1	4	4	67
4	(Denmark) Jan Magnussen	(Denmark) Formula Racing	3		11	2	2	52.5
5	(France) Grégoire Demoustier	(France) ART Grand Prix	7	8	5	3	5	45
5	(France) Yann Goudy	(France) ART Grand Prix	7	8	5	3	5	45
5	(Estonia) Kevin Korjus	(France) ART Grand Prix	7	8	5	3	5	45
6	(France) Henry Hassid	(France) Sébastien Loeb Racing	6					41
6	(France) Henry Hassid	(France) Pro GT by Alméras			6			41
6	(France) Henry Hassid	(Belgium) BMW Sport Trophy Marc VDS					1	41
7	(Switzerland) Karim Ajlani	(France) ART Grand Prix	5	4	4	8	Ret	38
7	(United Kingdom) Alex Brundle	(France) ART Grand Prix	5	4	4	8	Ret	38
7	(Mexico) Ricardo González	(France) ART Grand Prix	5	4	4	8	Ret	38
8	(Belgium) Adrien De Leener	(Italy) AF Corse	12	12	3	5	7	32
8	(Monaco) Cédric Sbirrazzuoli	(Italy) AF Corse	12	12	3	5	7	32
9	(Italy) Andrea Piccini	(Denmark) Formula Racing		1				26
10	(Ukraine) Sergey Chukanov	Team Ukraine	1					25
10	(Ukraine) Andrii Kruglyk	Team Ukraine	1					25
10	(Italy) Alessandro Pier Guidi	Team Ukraine	1					25

== Teams Championships ==
=== LMP2 ===
Pos	Team	Car	SIL (United Kingdom)	IMO (Italy)	RBR (Austria)	LEC (France)	EST (Portugal)	Total
1	(France) #36 Signatech Alpine	Alpine A450	5	3	1	2	5	78
2	(United Kingdom) #38 Jota Sport	Zytek Z11SN	Ret	1	2	4	3	74
3	(Switzerland) #43 Newblood by Morand Racing	Morgan LMP2	3	Ret	5	1	2	68
4	(France) #24 Sébastien Loeb Racing	Oreca 03	7	2		6	1	57
5	(Switzerland) #34 Race Performance	Oreca 03	2	7	3	7	4	57
6	(United Kingdom) #41 Greaves Motorsport	Zytek Z11SN	4	4	6	Ret	7	38
7	(France) #46 Thiriet by TDS Racing	Morgan LMP2	1	5				35
7	(France) #46 Thiriet by TDS Racing	Ligier JS P2			Ret	Ret	Ret	35
8	(United Kingdom) #28 Greaves Motorsport	Zytek Z11SN	6		4	5	Ret	30
9	(Republic of Ireland) #48 Murphy Prototypes	Oreca 03	8	Ret		3	6	28
10	(Germany) #29 Pegasus Racing	Morgan LMP2	Ret	6	7	Ret	8	18
11	(France) #50 Larbre Compétition	Morgan LMP2	9					2

=== LM GTE ===
Pos	Team	Car	SIL (United Kingdom)	IMO (Italy)	RBR (Austria)	LEC (France)	EST (Portugal)	Total
1	(Russia) #72 SMP Racing	Ferrari 458 Italia GT2	2	1	6	7	1	85
2	(Italy) #55 AF Corse	Ferrari 458 Italia GT2	1	7	1	1	11	81.5
3	(United Kingdom) #66 JMW Motorsport	Ferrari 458 Italia GT2	5	3	3	3	3	70
4	(Austria) #56 AT Racing	Ferrari 458 Italia GT2	4	4	4	2	6	62
5	(Italy) #54 AF Corse	Ferrari 458 Italia GT2	6	Ret	5	4	2	48
6	(Switzerland) #81 Kessel Racing	Ferrari 458 Italia GT2	13	2	2	9		39.5
7	(France) #76 IMSA Performance Matmut	Porsche 997 GT3-RSR	3	6	Ret	8	9	29
8	(United Kingdom) #86 Gulf Racing UK	Porsche 997 GT3-RSR	9	8	9			28
8	(United Kingdom) #86 Gulf Racing UK	Porsche 911 RSR				6	4	28
9	(United Kingdom) #85 Gulf Racing UK	Aston Martin V8 Vantage GTE	11	9	7	10	5	20.5
10	(France) #58 Team Sofrev ASP	Ferrari 458 Italia GT2	7	5	10	Ret	Ret	17
11	(Switzerland) #80 Kessel Racing	Ferrari 458 Italia GT2	10	Ret		5	7	17
12	(Italy) #70 AF Corse	Ferrari 458 Italia GT2			8	Ret	8	8
13	(France) #82 Crubilé Sport	Porsche 997 GT3-RSR	8	10				5
14	(France) #67 IMSA Performance Matmut	Porsche 997 GT3-RSR	12	11	12	11	10	3
15	(Germany) #77 Proton Competition	Porsche 997 GT3-RSR			11			0.5
16	(Italy) #65 AF Corse	Ferrari 458 Italia GT2		12				0.5

=== GTC ===
Pos	Team	Car	SIL (United Kingdom)	IMO (Italy)	RBR (Austria)	LEC (France)	EST (Portugal)	Total
1	(Russia) #73 SMP Racing	Ferrari 458 Italia GT3	2	2	2	1	3	94
2	(Denmark) #60 Formula Racing	Ferrari 458 Italia GT3	3	1	11	2	2	78.5
3	(Russia) #71 SMP Racing	Ferrari 458 Italia GT3	DNS	3	1	4	4	67
4	(France) #98 ART Grand Prix	McLaren MP4-12C GT3	7	8	5	3	5	45
5	(France) #99 ART Grand Prix	McLaren MP4-12C GT3	5	4	4	8	Ret	38
6	(Italy) #95 AF Corse	Ferrari 458 Italia GT3	12	12	3	5	7	32
7	#96 Team Ukraine	Ferrari 458 Italia GT3	1					25
8	(Belgium) #87 BMW Sport Trophy Marc VDS	BMW Z4 GT3					1	25
9	#78 Team Russia by Barwell	BMW Z4 GT3	4	9	Ret	10	6	23
10	(Italy) #63 AF Corse	Ferrari 458 Italia GT3	10	6	7	12	8	19.5
11	(France) #93 Pro GT by Alméras	Porsche 911 GT3-R	8	11	6	7		18.5
12	(Italy) #94 AF Corse	Ferrari 458 Italia GT3		7		6		14
13	(France) #59 Team Sofrev ASP	Ferrari 458 Italia GT3	11	5	10	13	10	13
14	(France) #51 Sébastien Loeb Racing	Audi R8 LMS ultra	6					8
15	(Belgium) #75 Prospeed Competition	Porsche 911 GT3-R	9	Ret	8	9	Ret	8
16	(Russia) #57 SMP Racing	Ferrari 458 Italia GT3		10	9	11	11	4
17	(Italy) #92 Ombra Racing	Ferrari 458 Italia GT3				14	9	2.5
18	(Italy) #62 AF Corse	Ferrari 458 Italia GT3	13	13				1
