= 2014 4 Hours of Silverstone =

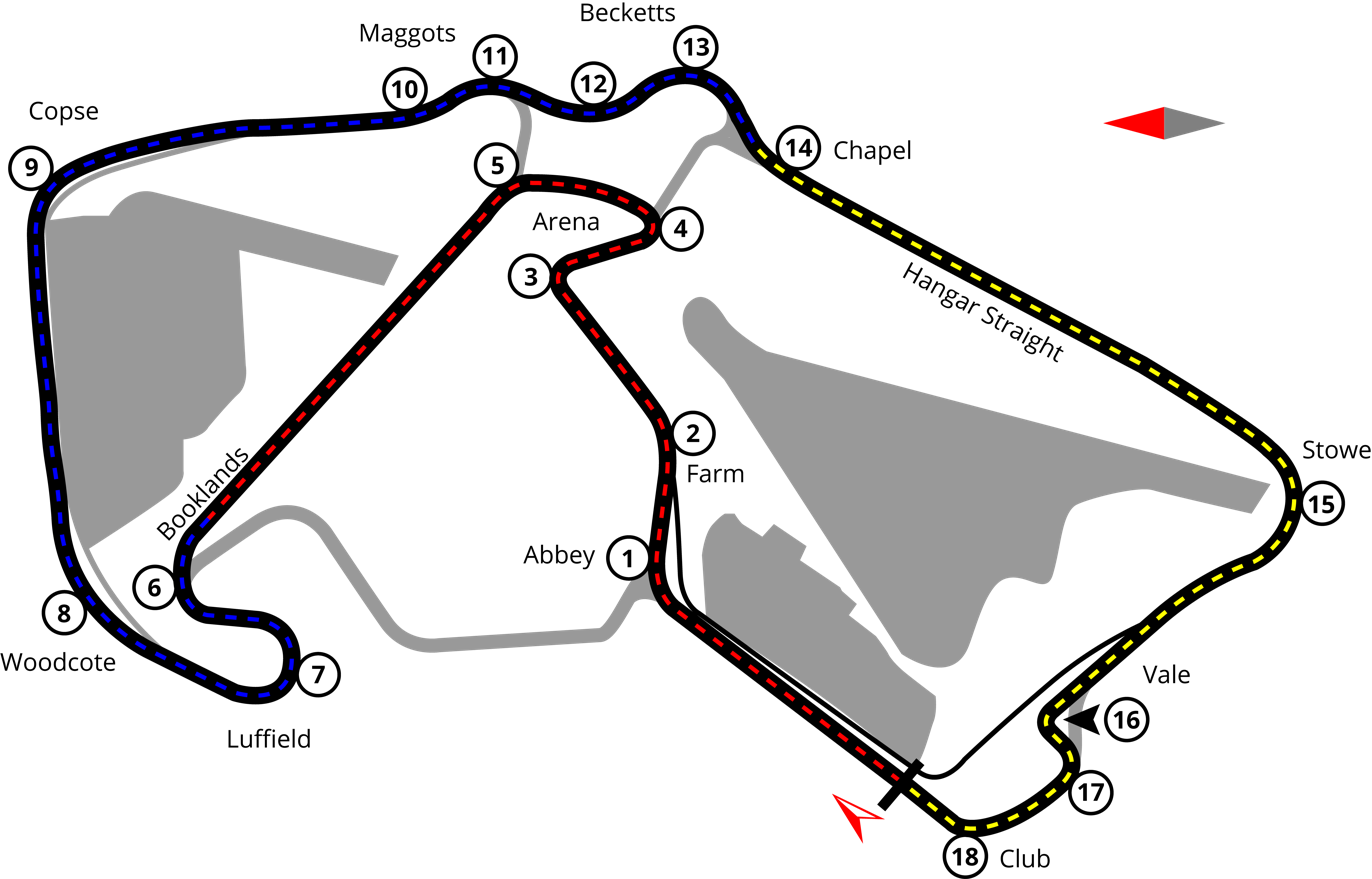
The Silverstone Circuit

The 2014 4 Hours of Silverstone was an endurance motor race held at the Silverstone Circuit near Silverstone, England on 18–19 April 2014, and served as the opening round of the 2014 European Le Mans Series, and the first race under the series' new four-hour format. The event shared the weekend at Silverstone with the FIA World Endurance Championship's six-hour event. The French trio of Pierre Thiriet, Ludovic Badey, and Tristan Gommendy won the race overall for TDS Racing, ahead of Race Performance's Michel Frey and Franck Mailleux and Morand Racing's Christian Klien, Gary Hirsch, and Romain Brandela. The LMGTE category was led by Duncan Cameron, Michele Rugolo, and Matt Griffin for AF Corse, while Team Ukraine's Andriy Kruglyk, Sergii Chukanov, and Alessandro Pier Guidi were victorious in the GTC class.

== Qualifying ==
=== Qualifying result ===
Pos	Class	No	Team	Drivers	Chassis	Tyre	Time
Pos	Class	No	Team	Drivers	Engine	Tyre	Time
1	LMP2	38	(United Kingdom) Jota Sport	(United Kingdom) Simon Dolan (United Kingdom) Harry Tincknell (Portugal) Filipe Albuquerque	Zytek Z11SN	D	1:47.702
1	LMP2	38	(United Kingdom) Jota Sport	(United Kingdom) Simon Dolan (United Kingdom) Harry Tincknell (Portugal) Filipe Albuquerque	Nissan VK45DE 4.5 L V8	D	1:47.702
2	LMP2	34	(Switzerland) Race Performance	(Switzerland) Michel Frey (France) Franck Mailleux	Oreca 03	D	1:48.854
2	LMP2	34	(Switzerland) Race Performance	(Switzerland) Michel Frey (France) Franck Mailleux	Judd HK 3.6 L V8	D	1:48.854
3	LMP2	48	(Republic of Ireland) Murphy Prototypes	(India) Karun Chandhok (Venezuela) Rodolfo González (United Kingdom) Alex Kapadia	Oreca 03	D	1:48.912
3	LMP2	48	(Republic of Ireland) Murphy Prototypes	(India) Karun Chandhok (Venezuela) Rodolfo González (United Kingdom) Alex Kapadia	Nissan VK45DE 4.5 L V8	D	1:48.912
4	LMP2	41	(United Kingdom) Greaves Motorsport	(United Kingdom) Tom Kimber-Smith (United States) Chris Dyson (United States) Matt McMurry	Zytek Z11SN	D	1:48.950
4	LMP2	41	(United Kingdom) Greaves Motorsport	(United Kingdom) Tom Kimber-Smith (United States) Chris Dyson (United States) Matt McMurry	Nissan VK45DE 4.5 L V8	D	1:48.950
5	LMP2	46	(France) Thiriet by TDS Racing	(France) Pierre Thiriet (France) Ludovic Badey (France) Tristan Gommendy	Morgan LMP2	D	1:49.057
5	LMP2	46	(France) Thiriet by TDS Racing	(France) Pierre Thiriet (France) Ludovic Badey (France) Tristan Gommendy	Nissan VK45DE 4.5 L V8	D	1:49.057
6	LMP2	43	(Switzerland) Newblood by Morand Racing	(France) Gary Hirsch (France) Romain Brandela (Austria) Christian Klien	Morgan LMP2	D	1:49.715
6	LMP2	43	(Switzerland) Newblood by Morand Racing	(France) Gary Hirsch (France) Romain Brandela (Austria) Christian Klien	Judd HK 3.6 L V8	D	1:49.715
7	LMP2	36	(France) Signatech Alpine	(France) Paul-Loup Chatin (France) Nelson Panciatici (United Kingdom) Oliver Webb	Alpine A450	M	1:49.762
7	LMP2	36	(France) Signatech Alpine	(France) Paul-Loup Chatin (France) Nelson Panciatici (United Kingdom) Oliver Webb	Nissan VK45DE 4.5 L V8	M	1:49.762
8	LMP2	28	(United Kingdom) Greaves Motorsport	(United Kingdom) James Littlejohn (United Kingdom) Anthony Wells (United Kingdom) James Walker	Zytek Z11SN	D	1:50.236
8	LMP2	28	(United Kingdom) Greaves Motorsport	(United Kingdom) James Littlejohn (United Kingdom) Anthony Wells (United Kingdom) James Walker	Nissan VK45DE 4.5 L V8	D	1:50.236
9	LMP2	24	(France) Sébastien Loeb Racing	(France) Vincent Capillaire (Czech Republic) Jan Charouz	Oreca 03	M	1:51.822
9	LMP2	24	(France) Sébastien Loeb Racing	(France) Vincent Capillaire (Czech Republic) Jan Charouz	Nissan VK45DE 4.5 L V8	M	1:51.822
10	LMP2	29	(Germany) Pegasus Racing	(France) Julien Schell (Austria) Niki Leutwiler (United Kingdom) Jonathan Coleman	Morgan LMP2	D	1:51.997
10	LMP2	29	(Germany) Pegasus Racing	(France) Julien Schell (Austria) Niki Leutwiler (United Kingdom) Jonathan Coleman	Nissan VK45DE 4.5 L V8	D	1:51.997
11	LMP2	50	(France) Larbre Compétition	(Colombia) Gustavo Yacamán (Japan) Keiko Ihara	Morgan LMP2	M	1:52.846
11	LMP2	50	(France) Larbre Compétition	(Colombia) Gustavo Yacamán (Japan) Keiko Ihara	Judd HK 3.6 L V8	M	1:52.846
12	LMGTE	72	(Russia) SMP Racing	(Italy) Andrea Bertolini (Russia) Viktor Shaitar (Russia) Sergey Zlobin	Ferrari 458 Italia GT2	M	1:57.970
12	LMGTE	72	(Russia) SMP Racing	(Italy) Andrea Bertolini (Russia) Viktor Shaitar (Russia) Sergey Zlobin	Ferrari 4.5 L V8	M	1:57.970
13	LMGTE	66	(United Kingdom) JMW Motorsport	(United Kingdom) Daniel McKenzie (United Kingdom) George Richardson (Italy) Daniel Zampieri	Ferrari 458 Italia GT2	D	1:58.590
13	LMGTE	66	(United Kingdom) JMW Motorsport	(United Kingdom) Daniel McKenzie (United Kingdom) George Richardson (Italy) Daniel Zampieri	Ferrari 4.5 L V8	D	1:58.590
14	LMGTE	55	(Italy) AF Corse	(United Kingdom) Duncan Cameron (Republic of Ireland) Matt Griffin (Italy) Michele Rugolo	Ferrari 458 Italia GT2	M	1:58.835
14	LMGTE	55	(Italy) AF Corse	(United Kingdom) Duncan Cameron (Republic of Ireland) Matt Griffin (Italy) Michele Rugolo	Ferrari 4.5 L V8	M	1:58.835
15	LMGTE	58	(France) Team SOFREV-ASP	(France) Anthony Pons (France) Soheil Ayari (France) Fabien Barthez	Ferrari 458 Italia GT2	M	1:59.166
15	LMGTE	58	(France) Team SOFREV-ASP	(France) Anthony Pons (France) Soheil Ayari (France) Fabien Barthez	Ferrari 4.5 L V8	M	1:59.166
16	LMGTE	81	(Switzerland) Kessel Racing	(Italy) Thomas Kemenater (Italy) Matteo Cressoni	Ferrari 458 Italia GT2	M	1:59.471
16	LMGTE	81	(Switzerland) Kessel Racing	(Italy) Thomas Kemenater (Italy) Matteo Cressoni	Ferrari 4.5 L V8	M	1:59.471
17	LMGTE	54	(Italy) AF Corse	(Italy) Piergiuseppe Perazzini (Italy) Marco Cioci (United Kingdom) Michael Lyons	Ferrari 458 Italia GT2	M	1:59.687
17	LMGTE	54	(Italy) AF Corse	(Italy) Piergiuseppe Perazzini (Italy) Marco Cioci (United Kingdom) Michael Lyons	Ferrari 4.5 L V8	M	1:59.687
18	LMGTE	76	(France) IMSA Performance Matmut	(France) Raymond Narac (France) Nicolas Armindo (France) David Hallyday	Porsche 997 GT3-RSR	M	1:59.755
18	LMGTE	76	(France) IMSA Performance Matmut	(France) Raymond Narac (France) Nicolas Armindo (France) David Hallyday	Porsche 4.0 L Flat-6	M	1:59.755
19	LMGTE	80	(Switzerland) Kessel Racing	(Poland) Michał Broniszewski (Italy) Giacomo Piccini	Ferrari 458 Italia GT2	M	1:59.775
19	LMGTE	80	(Switzerland) Kessel Racing	(Poland) Michał Broniszewski (Italy) Giacomo Piccini	Ferrari 4.5 L V8	M	1:59.775
20	LMGTE	56	(Austria) AT Racing	(Belarus) Alexander Talkanitsa, Sr. (Belarus) Alexander Talkanitsa, Jr. (Germany) Pierre Kaffer	Ferrari 458 Italia GT2	M	1:59.803
20	LMGTE	56	(Austria) AT Racing	(Belarus) Alexander Talkanitsa, Sr. (Belarus) Alexander Talkanitsa, Jr. (Germany) Pierre Kaffer	Ferrari 4.5 L V8	M	1:59.803
21	GTC	71	(Russia) SMP Racing	(Russia) Kirill Ladygin (Italy) Luca Persiani (Russia) Aleksey Basov	Ferrari 458 Italia GT3	M	2:00.032
21	GTC	71	(Russia) SMP Racing	(Russia) Kirill Ladygin (Italy) Luca Persiani (Russia) Aleksey Basov	Ferrari 4.5 L V8	M	2:00.032
22	GTC	96	Team Ukraine	(Ukraine) Andriy Kruglyk (Ukraine) Sergii Chukanov (Italy) Alessandro Pier Guidi	Ferrari 458 Italia GT3	M	2:00.209
22	GTC	96	Team Ukraine	(Ukraine) Andriy Kruglyk (Ukraine) Sergii Chukanov (Italy) Alessandro Pier Guidi	Ferrari 4.5 L V8	M	2:00.209
23	GTC	63	(Italy) AF Corse	(Denmark) Mads Rasmussen (Denmark) Dennis Lind	Ferrari 458 Italia GT3	M	2:00.676
23	GTC	63	(Italy) AF Corse	(Denmark) Mads Rasmussen (Denmark) Dennis Lind	Ferrari 4.5 L V8	M	2:00.676
24	LMGTE	82	(France) Crubilé Sport	(France) Sebastien Crubilé (France) François Perrodo (France) Emmanuel Collard	Porsche 997 GT3-RSR	M	2:00.717
24	LMGTE	82	(France) Crubilé Sport	(France) Sebastien Crubilé (France) François Perrodo (France) Emmanuel Collard	Porsche 4.0 L Flat-6	M	2:00.717
25	GTC	78	Team Russia by Barwell	(Russia) Leo Machitski (Russia) Timur Sardarov (United Kingdom) Jonny Cocker	BMW Z4 GT3	M	2:00.956
25	GTC	78	Team Russia by Barwell	(Russia) Leo Machitski (Russia) Timur Sardarov (United Kingdom) Jonny Cocker	BMW 4.4 L V8	M	2:00.956
26	GTC	98	(France) ART Grand Prix	(Estonia) Kevin Korjus (France) Grégoire Demoustier (France) Yann Goudy	McLaren MP4-12C GT3	M	2:01.091
26	GTC	98	(France) ART Grand Prix	(Estonia) Kevin Korjus (France) Grégoire Demoustier (France) Yann Goudy	McLaren 3.8 L Turbo V8	M	2:01.091
27	LMGTE	86	(United Kingdom) Gulf Racing UK	(United Kingdom) Michael Wainwright (United Kingdom) Adam Carroll (United Kingdom) Ben Barker	Porsche 997 GT3 RSR	M	2:01.222
27	LMGTE	86	(United Kingdom) Gulf Racing UK	(United Kingdom) Michael Wainwright (United Kingdom) Adam Carroll (United Kingdom) Ben Barker	Porsche 4.0 L Flat-6	M	2:01.222
28	GTC	60	(Denmark) Formula Racing	(Denmark) Jan Magnussen (Denmark) Johnny Laursen (Denmark) Mikkel Mac	Ferrari 458 Italia GT3	M	2:01.434
28	GTC	60	(Denmark) Formula Racing	(Denmark) Jan Magnussen (Denmark) Johnny Laursen (Denmark) Mikkel Mac	Ferrari 4.5 L V8	M	2:01.434
29	GTC	51	(France) Sébastien Loeb Racing	(France) Henri Hassid (France) Mike Parisy (France) Olivier Lombard	Audi R8 LMS ultra	M	2:01.589
29	GTC	51	(France) Sébastien Loeb Racing	(France) Henri Hassid (France) Mike Parisy (France) Olivier Lombard	Audi 5.2 L V10	M	2:01.589
30	GTC	99	(France) ART Grand Prix	(Mexico) Ricardo González (Switzerland) Karim Ajlani (United Kingdom) Alex Brundle	McLaren MP4-12C GT3	M	2:01.669
30	GTC	99	(France) ART Grand Prix	(Mexico) Ricardo González (Switzerland) Karim Ajlani (United Kingdom) Alex Brundle	McLaren 3.8 L Turbo V8	M	2:01.669
31	GTC	93	(France) Pro GT by Almeras	(France) Franck Perera (France) Lucas Laserre (France) Eric Dermont	Porsche 997 GT3 R	M	2:01.906
31	GTC	93	(France) Pro GT by Almeras	(France) Franck Perera (France) Lucas Laserre (France) Eric Dermont	Porsche 4.0 L Flat-6	M	2:01.906
32	GTC	59	(France) Team SOFREV-ASP	(France) Christophe Bourret (France) Pascal Gibon (France) Jean-Philippe Belloc	Ferrari 458 Italia GT3	M	2:02.020
32	GTC	59	(France) Team SOFREV-ASP	(France) Christophe Bourret (France) Pascal Gibon (France) Jean-Philippe Belloc	Ferrari 4.5 L V8	M	2:02.020
33	GTC	75	(Belgium) Prospeed Competition	(Netherlands) Paul Van Splunteren (Belgium) Maxime Soulet (France) Gilles Vannelet	Porsche 997 GT3 R	M	2:02.048
33	GTC	75	(Belgium) Prospeed Competition	(Netherlands) Paul Van Splunteren (Belgium) Maxime Soulet (France) Gilles Vannelet	Porsche 4.0 L Flat-6	M	2:02.048
34	LMGTE	67	(France) IMSA Performance Matmut	(France) Erik Maris (France) Jean-Marc Merlin (France) Éric Hélary	Porsche 997 GT3-RSR	M	2:02.355
34	LMGTE	67	(France) IMSA Performance Matmut	(France) Erik Maris (France) Jean-Marc Merlin (France) Éric Hélary	Porsche 4.0 L Flat-6	M	2:02.355
35	GTC	73	(Russia) SMP Racing	(Monaco) Olivier Beretta (Russia) Anton Ladygin (Russia) David Markozov	Ferrari 458 Italia GT3	M	2:04.384
35	GTC	73	(Russia) SMP Racing	(Monaco) Olivier Beretta (Russia) Anton Ladygin (Russia) David Markozov	Ferrari 4.5 L V8	M	2:04.384
36	GTC	95	(Italy) AF Corse	(Netherlands) Adrien De Leneer (Monaco) Cédric Sbirrazzuoli	Ferrari 458 Italia GT3	M	2:04.384
36	GTC	95	(Italy) AF Corse	(Netherlands) Adrien De Leneer (Monaco) Cédric Sbirrazzuoli	Ferrari 4.5 L V8	M	2:04.384
37	LMGTE	85	(United Kingdom) Gulf Racing UK	(Germany) Roald Goethe (United Kingdom) Stuart Hall (United Kingdom) Dan Brown	Aston Martin V8 Vantage GTE	M	2:04.701
37	LMGTE	85	(United Kingdom) Gulf Racing UK	(Germany) Roald Goethe (United Kingdom) Stuart Hall (United Kingdom) Dan Brown	Aston Martin 4.5 L V8	M	2:04.701
38	GTC	62	(Italy) AF Corse	(France) Yannick Mollegol (France) Jean-Marc Bachelier (United States) Howard Blank	Ferrari 458 Italia GT3	M	2:04.716
38	GTC	62	(Italy) AF Corse	(France) Yannick Mollegol (France) Jean-Marc Bachelier (United States) Howard Blank	Ferrari 4.5 L V8	M	2:04.716

== Race ==
=== Race result ===
Class winners in bold.

Pos	Class	No	Team	Drivers	Chassis	Tyre	Laps	Gap/Retired
Pos	Class	No	Team	Drivers	Engine	Tyre	Laps	Gap/Retired
1	**LMP2**	**46**	**(France) Thiriet by TDS Racing**	**(France) Pierre Thiriet (France) Ludovic Badey (France) Tristan Gommendy**	**Morgan LMP2**	D	**118**	**4:00'29.711**
1	**LMP2**	**46**	**(France) Thiriet by TDS Racing**	**(France) Pierre Thiriet (France) Ludovic Badey (France) Tristan Gommendy**	**Nissan VK45DE 4.5 L V8**	D	**118**	**4:00'29.711**
2	LMP2	34	(Switzerland) Race Performance	(Switzerland) Michel Frey (France) Franck Mailleux	Oreca 03	D	118	+ 3.828
2	LMP2	34	(Switzerland) Race Performance	(Switzerland) Michel Frey (France) Franck Mailleux	Judd HK 3.6 L V8	D	118	+ 3.828
3	LMP2	43	(Switzerland) Newblood by Morand Racing	(France) Gary Hirsch (France) Romain Brandela (Austria) Christian Klien	Morgan LMP2	D	118	+ 4.731
3	LMP2	43	(Switzerland) Newblood by Morand Racing	(France) Gary Hirsch (France) Romain Brandela (Austria) Christian Klien	Judd HK 3.6 L V8	D	118	+ 4.731
4	LMP2	41	(United Kingdom) Greaves Motorsport	(United Kingdom) Tom Kimber-Smith (United States) Chris Dyson (United States) Matt McMurry	Zytek Z11SN	D	118	+ 14.388
4	LMP2	41	(United Kingdom) Greaves Motorsport	(United Kingdom) Tom Kimber-Smith (United States) Chris Dyson (United States) Matt McMurry	Nissan VK45DE 4.5 L V8	D	118	+ 14.388
5	LMP2	36	(France) Signatech Alpine	(France) Paul-Loup Chatin (France) Nelson Panciatici (United Kingdom) Oliver Webb	Alpine A450	M	118	+ 55.068
5	LMP2	36	(France) Signatech Alpine	(France) Paul-Loup Chatin (France) Nelson Panciatici (United Kingdom) Oliver Webb	Nissan VK45DE 4.5 L V8	M	118	+ 55.068
6	LMP2	28	(United Kingdom) Greaves Motorsport	(United Kingdom) James Littlejohn (United Kingdom) Anthony Wells (United Kingdom) James Walker	Zytek Z11SN	D	118	+ 1'00.569
6	LMP2	28	(United Kingdom) Greaves Motorsport	(United Kingdom) James Littlejohn (United Kingdom) Anthony Wells (United Kingdom) James Walker	Nissan VK45DE 4.5 L V8	D	118	+ 1'00.569
7	LMP2	24	(France) Sébastien Loeb Racing	(France) Vincent Capillaire (Czech Republic) Jan Charouz	Oreca 03	M	116	+ 2 Laps
7	LMP2	24	(France) Sébastien Loeb Racing	(France) Vincent Capillaire (Czech Republic) Jan Charouz	Nissan VK45DE 4.5 L V8	M	116	+ 2 Laps
8	LMP2	48	(Republic of Ireland) Murphy Prototypes	(India) Karun Chandhok (Venezuela) Rodolfo González (United Kingdom) Alex Kapadia	Oreca 03	D	112	+ 6 Laps
8	LMP2	48	(Republic of Ireland) Murphy Prototypes	(India) Karun Chandhok (Venezuela) Rodolfo González (United Kingdom) Alex Kapadia	Nissan VK45DE 4.5 L V8	D	112	+ 6 Laps
9	**LMGTE**	**55**	**(Italy) AF Corse**	**(United Kingdom) Duncan Cameron (Republic of Ireland) Matt Griffin (Italy) Michele Rugolo**	**Ferrari 458 Italia GT2**	M	**112**	**+ 6 Laps**
9	**LMGTE**	**55**	**(Italy) AF Corse**	**(United Kingdom) Duncan Cameron (Republic of Ireland) Matt Griffin (Italy) Michele Rugolo**	**Ferrari 4.5 L V8**	M	**112**	**+ 6 Laps**
10	LMGTE	72	(Russia) SMP Racing	(Italy) Andrea Bertolini (Russia) Viktor Shaitar (Russia) Sergey Zlobin	Ferrari 458 Italia GT2	M	112	+ 6 Laps
10	LMGTE	72	(Russia) SMP Racing	(Italy) Andrea Bertolini (Russia) Viktor Shaitar (Russia) Sergey Zlobin	Ferrari 4.5 L V8	M	112	+ 6 Laps
11	LMGTE	76	(France) IMSA Performance Matmut	(France) Raymond Narac (France) Nicolas Armindo (France) David Hallyday	Porsche 997 GT3-RSR	M	111	+ 7 Laps
11	LMGTE	76	(France) IMSA Performance Matmut	(France) Raymond Narac (France) Nicolas Armindo (France) David Hallyday	Porsche 4.0 L Flat-6	M	111	+ 7 Laps
12	LMP2	50	(France) Larbre Compétition	(Colombia) Gustavo Yacamán (Japan) Keiko Ihara	Morgan LMP2	M	111	+ 7 Laps
12	LMP2	50	(France) Larbre Compétition	(Colombia) Gustavo Yacamán (Japan) Keiko Ihara	Judd HK 3.6 L V8	M	111	+ 7 Laps
13	LMGTE	56	(Austria) AT Racing	(Belarus) Alexander Talkanitsa, Sr. (Belarus) Alexander Talkanitsa, Jr. (Germany) Pierre Kaffer	Ferrari 458 Italia GT2	M	111	+ 7 Laps
13	LMGTE	56	(Austria) AT Racing	(Belarus) Alexander Talkanitsa, Sr. (Belarus) Alexander Talkanitsa, Jr. (Germany) Pierre Kaffer	Ferrari 4.5 L V8	M	111	+ 7 Laps
14	LMGTE	66	(United Kingdom) JMW Motorsport	(United Kingdom) Daniel McKenzie (United Kingdom) George Richardson (Italy) Daniel Zampieri	Ferrari 458 Italia GT2	D	111	+ 7 Laps
14	LMGTE	66	(United Kingdom) JMW Motorsport	(United Kingdom) Daniel McKenzie (United Kingdom) George Richardson (Italy) Daniel Zampieri	Ferrari 4.5 L V8	D	111	+ 7 Laps
15	LMGTE	54	(Italy) AF Corse	(Italy) Piergiuseppe Perazzini (Italy) Marco Cioci (United Kingdom) Michael Lyons	Ferrari 458 Italia GT2	M	110	+ 8 Laps
15	LMGTE	54	(Italy) AF Corse	(Italy) Piergiuseppe Perazzini (Italy) Marco Cioci (United Kingdom) Michael Lyons	Ferrari 4.5 L V8	M	110	+ 8 Laps
16	LMGTE	58	(France) Team SOFREV-ASP	(France) Anthony Pons (France) Soheil Ayari (France) Fabien Barthez	Ferrari 458 Italia GT2	M	110	+ 8 Laps
16	LMGTE	58	(France) Team SOFREV-ASP	(France) Anthony Pons (France) Soheil Ayari (France) Fabien Barthez	Ferrari 4.5 L V8	M	110	+ 8 Laps
17	**GTC**	**96**	**Team Ukraine**	**(Ukraine) Andriy Kruglyk (Ukraine) Sergii Chukanov (Italy) Alessandro Pier Guidi**	**Ferrari 458 Italia GT3**	M	**109**	**+ 9 Laps**
17	**GTC**	**96**	**Team Ukraine**	**(Ukraine) Andriy Kruglyk (Ukraine) Sergii Chukanov (Italy) Alessandro Pier Guidi**	**Ferrari 4.5 L V8**	M	**109**	**+ 9 Laps**
18	GTC	73	(Russia) SMP Racing	(Monaco) Olivier Beretta (Russia) Anton Ladygin (Russia) David Markozov	Ferrari 458 Italia GT3	M	109	+ 9 Laps
18	GTC	73	(Russia) SMP Racing	(Monaco) Olivier Beretta (Russia) Anton Ladygin (Russia) David Markozov	Ferrari 4.5 L V8	M	109	+ 9 Laps
19	GTC	60	(Denmark) Formula Racing	(Denmark) Jan Magnussen (Denmark) Johnny Laursen (Denmark) Mikkel Mac	Ferrari 458 Italia GT3	M	109	+ 9 Laps
19	GTC	60	(Denmark) Formula Racing	(Denmark) Jan Magnussen (Denmark) Johnny Laursen (Denmark) Mikkel Mac	Ferrari 4.5 L V8	M	109	+ 9 Laps
20	LMGTE	82	(France) Crubilé Sport	(France) Sebastien Crubilé (France) François Perrodo (France) Emmanuel Collard	Porsche 997 GT3-RSR	M	109	+ 9 Laps
20	LMGTE	82	(France) Crubilé Sport	(France) Sebastien Crubilé (France) François Perrodo (France) Emmanuel Collard	Porsche 4.0 L Flat-6	M	109	+ 9 Laps
21	LMGTE	86	(United Kingdom) Gulf Racing UK	(United Kingdom) Michael Wainwright (United Kingdom) Adam Carroll (United Kingdom) Ben Barker	Porsche 997 GT3 RSR	M	109	+ 9 Laps
21	LMGTE	86	(United Kingdom) Gulf Racing UK	(United Kingdom) Michael Wainwright (United Kingdom) Adam Carroll (United Kingdom) Ben Barker	Porsche 4.0 L Flat-6	M	109	+ 9 Laps
22	LMGTE	80	(Switzerland) Kessel Racing	(Poland) Michał Broniszewski (Italy) Giacomo Piccini	Ferrari 458 Italia GT2	M	108	+ 10 Laps
22	LMGTE	80	(Switzerland) Kessel Racing	(Poland) Michał Broniszewski (Italy) Giacomo Piccini	Ferrari 4.5 L V8	M	108	+ 10 Laps
23	GTC	78	Team Russia by Barwell	(Russia) Leo Machitski (Russia) Timur Sardarov (United Kingdom) Jonny Cocker	BMW Z4 GT3	M	108	+ 10 Laps
23	GTC	78	Team Russia by Barwell	(Russia) Leo Machitski (Russia) Timur Sardarov (United Kingdom) Jonny Cocker	BMW 4.4 L V8	M	108	+ 10 Laps
24^{1}	LMGTE	85	(United Kingdom) Gulf Racing UK	(Germany) Roald Goethe (United Kingdom) Stuart Hall (United Kingdom) Dan Brown	Aston Martin V8 Vantage GTE	M	108	+ 10 Laps
24^{1}	LMGTE	85	(United Kingdom) Gulf Racing UK	(Germany) Roald Goethe (United Kingdom) Stuart Hall (United Kingdom) Dan Brown	Aston Martin 4.5 L V8	M	108	+ 10 Laps
25	GTC	99	(France) ART Grand Prix	(Mexico) Ricardo González (Switzerland) Karim Ajlani (United Kingdom) Alex Brundle	McLaren MP4-12C GT3	M	107	+ 11 Laps
25	GTC	99	(France) ART Grand Prix	(Mexico) Ricardo González (Switzerland) Karim Ajlani (United Kingdom) Alex Brundle	McLaren 3.8 L Turbo V8	M	107	+ 11 Laps
26	GTC	51	(France) Sébastien Loeb Racing	(France) Henri Hassid (France) Mike Parisy (France) Olivier Lombard	Audi R8 LMS ultra	M	107	+ 11 Laps
26	GTC	51	(France) Sébastien Loeb Racing	(France) Henri Hassid (France) Mike Parisy (France) Olivier Lombard	Audi 5.2 L V10	M	107	+ 11 Laps
27	GTC	98	(France) ART Grand Prix	(Estonia) Kevin Korjus (France) Grégoire Demoustier (France) Yann Goudy	McLaren MP4-12C GT3	M	107	+ 11 Laps
27	GTC	98	(France) ART Grand Prix	(Estonia) Kevin Korjus (France) Grégoire Demoustier (France) Yann Goudy	McLaren 3.8 L Turbo V8	M	107	+ 11 Laps
28	GTC	93	(France) Pro GT by Almeras	(France) Franck Perera (France) Lucas Laserre (France) Eric Dermont	Porsche 997 GT3 R	M	107	+ 11 Laps
28	GTC	93	(France) Pro GT by Almeras	(France) Franck Perera (France) Lucas Laserre (France) Eric Dermont	Porsche 4.0 L Flat-6	M	107	+ 11 Laps
29	GTC	75	(Belgium) Prospeed Competition	(Netherlands) Paul Van Splunteren (Belgium) Maxime Soulet (France) Gilles Vannelet	Porsche 997 GT3 R	M	107	+ 11 Laps
29	GTC	75	(Belgium) Prospeed Competition	(Netherlands) Paul Van Splunteren (Belgium) Maxime Soulet (France) Gilles Vannelet	Porsche 4.0 L Flat-6	M	107	+ 11 Laps
30	GTC	63	(Italy) AF Corse	(Denmark) Mads Rasmussen (Denmark) Dennis Lind	Ferrari 458 Italia GT3	M	106	+ 12 Laps
30	GTC	63	(Italy) AF Corse	(Denmark) Mads Rasmussen (Denmark) Dennis Lind	Ferrari 4.5 L V8	M	106	+ 12 Laps
31	LMGTE	67	(France) IMSA Performance Matmut	(France) Erik Maris (France) Jean-Marc Merlin (France) Éric Hélary	Porsche 997 GT3-RSR	M	106	+ 12 Laps
31	LMGTE	67	(France) IMSA Performance Matmut	(France) Erik Maris (France) Jean-Marc Merlin (France) Éric Hélary	Porsche 4.0 L Flat-6	M	106	+ 12 Laps
32	GTC	59	(France) Team SOFREV-ASP	(France) Christophe Bourret (France) Pascal Gibon (France) Jean-Philippe Belloc	Ferrari 458 Italia GT3	M	106	+ 12 Laps
32	GTC	59	(France) Team SOFREV-ASP	(France) Christophe Bourret (France) Pascal Gibon (France) Jean-Philippe Belloc	Ferrari 4.5 L V8	M	106	+ 12 Laps
33	LMGTE	81	(Switzerland) Kessel Racing	(Italy) Thomas Kemenater (Italy) Matteo Cressoni	Ferrari 458 Italia GT2	M	104	+ 14 Laps
33	LMGTE	81	(Switzerland) Kessel Racing	(Italy) Thomas Kemenater (Italy) Matteo Cressoni	Ferrari 4.5 L V8	M	104	+ 14 Laps
34	GTC	95	(Italy) AF Corse	(Netherlands) Adrien De Leneer (Monaco) Cédric Sbirrazzuoli	Ferrari 458 Italia GT3	M	102	+ 16 Laps
34	GTC	95	(Italy) AF Corse	(Netherlands) Adrien De Leneer (Monaco) Cédric Sbirrazzuoli	Ferrari 4.5 L V8	M	102	+ 16 Laps
35	GTC	62	(Italy) AF Corse	(France) Yannick Mollegol (France) Jean-Marc Bachelier (United States) Howard Blank	Ferrari 458 Italia GT3	M	102	+ 16 Laps
35	GTC	62	(Italy) AF Corse	(France) Yannick Mollegol (France) Jean-Marc Bachelier (United States) Howard Blank	Ferrari 4.5 L V8	M	102	+ 16 Laps
DNF	LMP2	38	(United Kingdom) Jota Sport	(United Kingdom) Simon Dolan (United Kingdom) Harry Tincknell (Portugal) Filipe Albuquerque	Zytek Z11SN	D	97	Collision
DNF	LMP2	38	(United Kingdom) Jota Sport	(United Kingdom) Simon Dolan (United Kingdom) Harry Tincknell (Portugal) Filipe Albuquerque	Nissan VK45DE 4.5 L V8	D	97	Collision
DNF	LMP2	29	(Germany) Pegasus Racing	(France) Julien Schell (Austria) Niki Leutwiler (United Kingdom) Jonathan Coleman	Morgan LMP2	D	74	Retired
DNF	LMP2	29	(Germany) Pegasus Racing	(France) Julien Schell (Austria) Niki Leutwiler (United Kingdom) Jonathan Coleman	Nissan VK45DE 4.5 L V8	D	74	Retired
DNS	GTC	71	(Russia) SMP Racing	(Russia) Kirill Ladygin (Italy) Luca Persiani (Russia) Aleksey Basov	Ferrari 458 Italia GT3	M	–	Oil leak
DNS	GTC	71	(Russia) SMP Racing	(Russia) Kirill Ladygin (Italy) Luca Persiani (Russia) Aleksey Basov	Ferrari 4.5 L V8	M	–	Oil leak

^1 – The No. 85 Gulf Racing Aston Martin was penalized two laps by race stewards following the race for not adhering to the driver time requirements.

== See also ==
- 2014 6 Hours of Silverstone

European Le Mans Series
Previous race: none	2014 season	Next race: 4 Hours of Imola
