= Mikkel Mac =

Danish racing driver

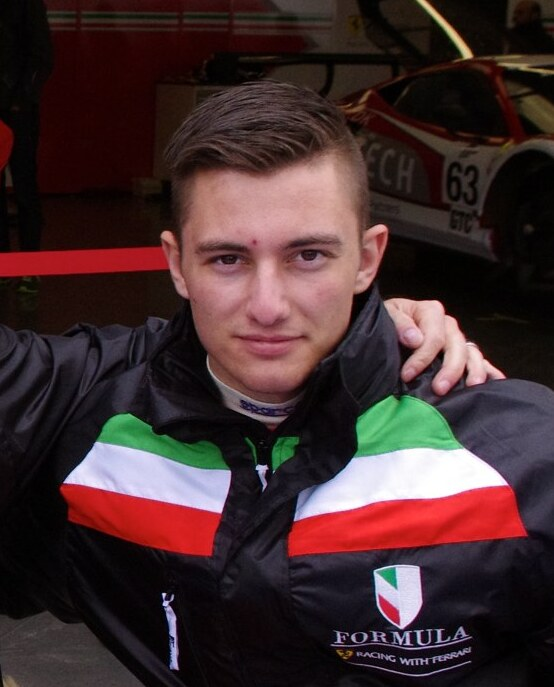
- Mac during the 2014 4 Hours of Silverstone
- Nationality: (Denmark) Danish
- Born: Mikkel Mac Jensen; 18 December 1992 (age 33) Nykøbing Falster, Denmark
- Categorisation: FIA Silver (until 2014); FIA Gold (2015–)

Mikkel Mac Jensen (born 18 December 1992 in Nykøbing Falster) is a Danish racing driver.

== Career ==
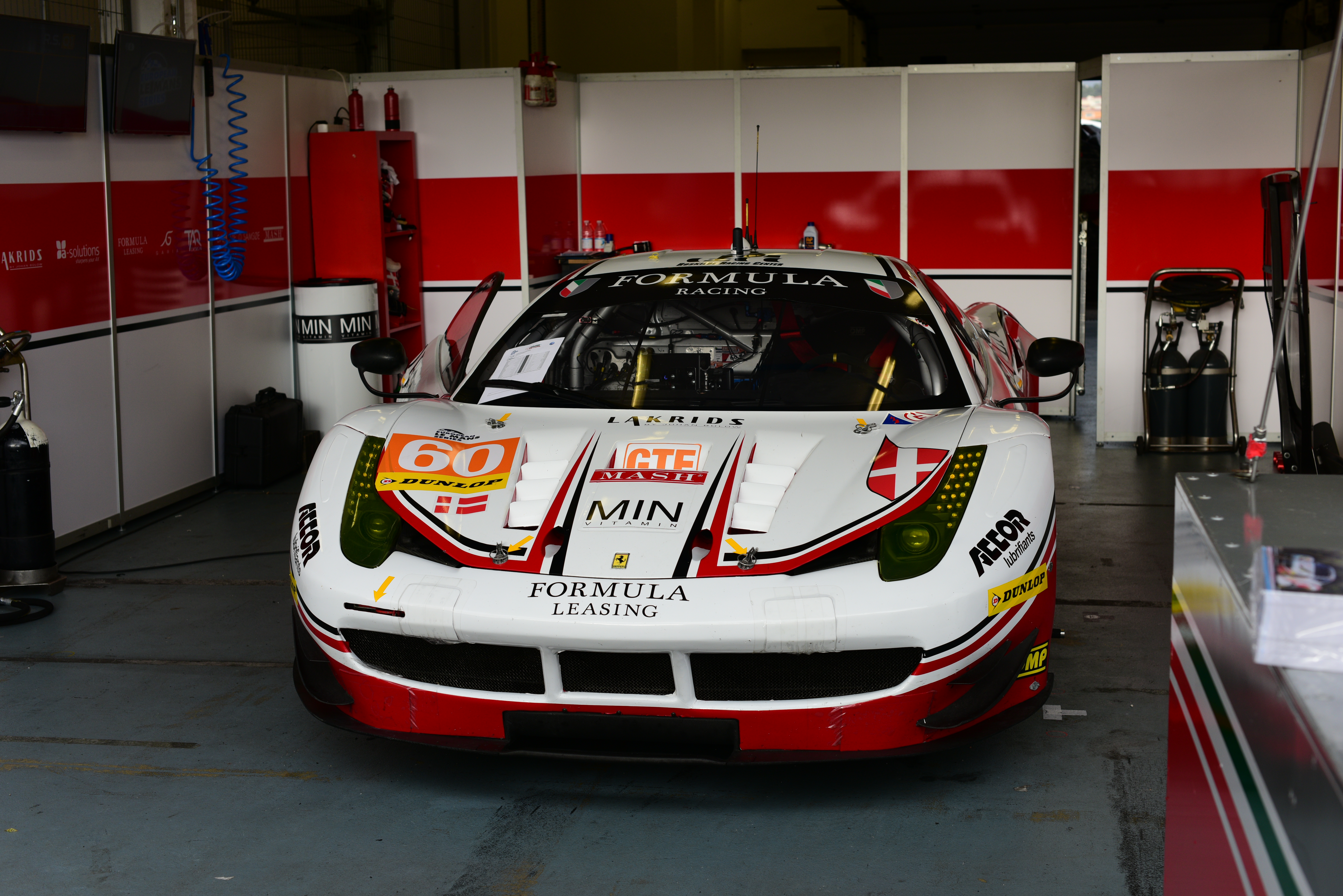
Mac's Formula Racing Ferrari at the 2016 Estoril 4 Hours.

Like many other racing drivers, Mac began his racing career in karting. He remained in karting until 2008. In 2009, he began his formula racing career. He started eight of 16 races in Danish Formula Ford, achieving six podium finishes and two victories. He concluded the season in the seventh position. He also participated in five rounds of Formula BMW Europe, finishing 23rd in the championship. In 2010, Mac moved to the Formula Renault 2.0 Northern European Cup, driving for KTR. He won three races and finished runner-up behind Ludwig Ghidi with 340 points.

=== International GT Open ===
Mac joined the Ferrari supported team Spirit of Race / AF Corse for the 2017 GT Open series. Along with Miguel Ramos, Mac would the Ferrari 488 in the GT-Pro class.

=== Danish Superturisme Turbo ===
For the 2017 season of DST, Mac would join Team Roskilde Racing Center, where he would be driving together with Henrik Jansen and Peter Christensen.

=== European Le Mans series ===
Mac won in the LMGTE class of the 2015 European Le Mans Series or ELMS, Racing Ferrari 458 GT2 in the GTE Class.

=== European Le Mans series ===
Mac finished in second place in debut season 2014 European Le Mans Series or ELMS, Racing Ferrari 458 GT3 in the GTC Class.

=== Maserati Trofeo World series ===
In 2013, Mac began competing in the Maserati Trofeo World Series, and finished the season winning two titles (Drivers Championship) (under age 30 Championship).

=== DTC ===
In 2012, Mac began competing in the Danish Thundersport Championship, and finished the season in a solid fifth place.

=== Formula Two ===
In 2011, Mac began competing in the FIA Formula Two Championship, and finished the season in a solid 11th place.

== Racing record ==
=== Career summary ===
Season	Series	Team name	Races	Wins	Poles	F/Laps	Podiums	Points	Position
2009	Danish Formula Ford		8	2	0	1	6	129	7th
2009	Formula BMW Europe	Motaworld Racing	10	0	0	0	0	4	25th
2009	North European Formula Ford		2	0	0	0	1	20	11th
2010	Formula Renault 2.0 NEC	KTR	19	3	1	2	6	340	**2nd**
2011	FIA Formula Two Championship	MotorSport Vision	14	0	0	0	0	23	11th
2012	Camaro Cup Sweden	Fukamuni Racing	4	0	0	0	2	54	21st
2012	Danish Thundersport Championship	Fukamuni Racing	8	2	3	0	2	-	5th
2013	Trofeo Maserati World Series		18	1	2	1	8	203	**2nd**
2014	European Le Mans Series - GTC	Formula Racing	5	1	1	0	4	78.5	**2nd**
2014	Maxi Endurance 32H - Sport	Formula Racing	1	1	1		1	-	**1st**
2014	SEAT León Eurocup	Veloso Motorsport	2	0	0	0	0	-	-
2015	European Le Mans Series - GTE	Formula Racing	5	2	0	0	3	83	**1st**
2015	Danish Supertourisme	Image Racing	12	2	0	1	6	259.5	9th
2016	European Le Mans Series - GTE	Formula Racing	5	0	0	0	1	40	9th
2016	24 Hours of Le Mans - GTE Am	Formula Racing	1	0	0	0	0	N/A	6th
2017	International GT Open	Spirit of Race	14	1	2	3	7	90	5th
2017	OK Mobil1 Danish Supertourisme Turbo		14	6	0	9	7	336	6th
2018	International GT Open	Luzich Racing	14	4	3	4	8	124	**1st**
2018	Danish Supertourisme	Roskilde Racing Center 2	3	1	0	0	2	70	23rd
2019	Le Mans Cup - GT3	Luzich Racing	7	3	0	2	5	109	**2nd**
2019	OK Mobil1 Super GT Danmark	Team Jørgen Hansen Biler	21	4	0	4	7	384	**2nd**
2020	GT World Challenge Europe Endurance Cup	Emil Frey Racing	1	0	0	0	0	4	29th
2020	Super GT Danmark		15	4	2	2	9	344	**2nd**
2021	Nürburgring Langstrecken-Serie - H2	MSC Sinzig e.V. im ADAC	1	0	0	0	0	-	-
2022	Danish Super GT		18	7	0	7	11	445	**1st**
2022	Italian GT Sprint Championship - GTC Pro-Am	Team Baron Motorsport	2	0	1	1	2	-	-
2023	European Le Mans Series - GTE	Formula Racing	1	0	0	0	1	18	15th
2023	GT World Challenge Asia - GT3	Phantom Pro Racing	12	0	0	0	0	33	20th
2023	British Endurance Championship - Class B	Scott Sport	0	0	0	0	0	31	19th
2024	Italian GT Endurance Championship - GT3 Pro-Am	AF Corse	4	1	0	0	2	64.5	**3rd**
2025	GT Winter Series - Cup 1	AF Corse							
2026	GT World Challenge Europe Endurance Cup	Steller Motorsport	3	0	0	0	0	0	NC

* Season still in progress. '

=== Complete Formula Renault 2.0 NEC results ===
(key) (Races in bold indicate pole position) (Races in italics indicate fastest lap)

Year	Entrant	1	2	3	4	5	6	7	8	9	10	11	12	13	14	15	16	17	18	19	20	DC	Points
2010	KTR	HOC; 1; 4	HOC; 2; 2	BRN; 1; 12	BRN; 2; 11	ZAN; 1; 11	ZAN; 2; 1	**OSC**; **1**; 1	OSC; 2; 4	**OSC**; **3**; 1	ASS; 1; 6	ASS; 2; 6	MST; 1; 4	MST; 2; 5	MST; 3; 2	SPA; 1; 5	SPA; 2; 6	SPA; 3; 11	NÜR; 1; 5	NÜR; 2; 2	NÜR; 3 C	2nd	340

=== Complete FIA Formula Two Championship results ===
(key) (Races in bold indicate pole position) (Races in italics indicate fastest lap)

Year	1	2	3	4	5	6	7	8	9	10	11	12	13	14	15	16	Pos	Points
2011	SIL; 1; 12	SIL; 2; 9	MAG; 1; 15	MAG; 2; 12	SPA; 1; 11	SPA; 2; 14	NÜR; 1; 8	NÜR; 2; 6	BRH; 1; 13	BRH; 2; 11	RBR; 1 Ret	RBR; 2; 9	MON; 1; 9	MON; 2; 11	CAT; 1; 10	CAT; 2; 8	11th	23

=== Complete European Le Mans Series results ===
(key) (Races in bold indicate pole position) (Races in italics indicate fastest lap)

Year	Entrant	Class	Chassis	Engine	1	2	3	4	5	6	Pos	Points
2014	Formula Racing	GTC	Ferrari 458 Italia GT3	Ferrari F136 4.5 L V8	SIL; 3	**IMO**; 1	**RBR**; 11	LEC; 2	EST; 2		2nd	78.5
2015	Formula Racing	LMGTE	Ferrari 458 Italia GT2	Ferrari F136 4.5 L V8	SIL; 6	IMO; 3	RBR; 1	LEC; 1	EST; 5		1st	83
2016	Formula Racing	LMGTE	Ferrari 458 Italia GT2	Ferrari F136 4.5 L V8	SIL; 5	IMO; DNS	RBR; 7	LEC; 2	SPA; 7	EST; Ret	9th	40
2023	Formula Racing	LMGTE	Ferrari 488 GTE Evo	Ferrari F154CB 3.9 L Turbo V8	CAT; 2	LEC	ARA	SPA	ALG	POR	15th	18

=== Complete 24 Hours of Le Mans results ===
Year	Team	Co-Drivers	Car	Class	Laps	Pos.	Class Pos.
2016	(Denmark) Formula Racing	(Denmark) Johnny Laursen (Denmark) Christina Nielsen	Ferrari 458 Italia GT2	GTE; Am	319	35th	6th

=== Complete GT World Challenge Europe results ===
==== GT World Challenge Europe Endurance Cup ====
(key) (Races in bold indicate pole position) (Races in italics indicate fastest lap)

Year	Team	Car	Class	1	2	3	4	5	6	7	Pos.	Points
2020	Emil Frey Racing	Lamborghini Huracán GT3 Evo	Pro	IMO	NÜR	SPA; 6H	SPA; 12H	SPA; 24H	LEC; 8		29th	4
2026	Steller Motorsport	Chevrolet Corvette Z06 GT3.R	Gold	LEC	MNZ; 26	SPA; 6H	SPA; 12H	SPA; 24H	NÜR; 21	ALG; 48	14th	28

Sporting positions
Preceded by Giovanni Venturini	International GT Open; Champion; 2018	Succeeded by Giacomo Altoè; Albert Costa
