= 2014 4 Hours of Red Bull Ring =

Motor sport competition

The Red Bull Ring

The 2014 4 Hours of Red Bull Ring was an endurance auto race held at the Red Bull Ring in Spielberg, Styria, Austria on 19–20 July 2014. It was the third round of the 2014 European Le Mans Series season and marked the first race following the 2014 24 Hours of Le Mans which many series teams participated in. This would be the second race held at the Red Bull Ring for the European Le Mans Series after previously being held the year before in 2013.

The Signatech Alpine trio of Paul-Loup Chatin, Nelson Panciatici, and Oliver Webb won the race over recent Le Mans class winners Jota Sport. AF Corse's Matt Griffin, Duncan Cameron, and Michele Rugolo won the LMGTE class for the second time in the season. SMP Racing scored a one-two victory in GTC with the Kirill Ladygin, Aleksey Basov, and Luca Persiani ahead of their teammates.

== Race ==
=== Race result ===
Class winners in bold.

Pos	Class	No	Team	Drivers	Chassis	Tyre	Laps
Pos	Class	No	Team	Drivers	Engine	Tyre	Laps
1	**LMP2**	**36**	**(France) Signatech Alpine**	**(France) Paul-Loup Chatin (France) Nelson Panciatici (United Kingdom) Oliver Webb**	**Alpine A450b**	D	**160**
1	**LMP2**	**36**	**(France) Signatech Alpine**	**(France) Paul-Loup Chatin (France) Nelson Panciatici (United Kingdom) Oliver Webb**	**Nissan VK45DE 4.5 L V8**	D	**160**
2	LMP2	38	(United Kingdom) Jota Sport	(United Kingdom) Simon Dolan (United Kingdom) Harry Tincknell (Portugal) Filipe Albuquerque	Zytek Z11SN	D	160
2	LMP2	38	(United Kingdom) Jota Sport	(United Kingdom) Simon Dolan (United Kingdom) Harry Tincknell (Portugal) Filipe Albuquerque	Nissan VK45DE 4.5 L V8	D	160
3	LMP2	34	(Switzerland) Race Performance	(Switzerland) Michel Frey (France) Franck Mailleux	Oreca 03	D	160
3	LMP2	34	(Switzerland) Race Performance	(Switzerland) Michel Frey (France) Franck Mailleux	Judd HK 3.6 L V8	D	160
4	LMP2	28	(United Kingdom) Greaves Motorsport	(United Kingdom) Luciano Bacheta (Russia) Mark Shulzhitskiy	Zytek Z11SN	D	160
4	LMP2	28	(United Kingdom) Greaves Motorsport	(United Kingdom) Luciano Bacheta (Russia) Mark Shulzhitskiy	Nissan VK45DE 4.5 L V8	D	160
5	LMP2	43	(Switzerland) Newblood by Morand Racing	(France) Gary Hirsch (France) Pierre Ragues (Austria) Christian Klien	Morgan LMP2	D	158
5	LMP2	43	(Switzerland) Newblood by Morand Racing	(France) Gary Hirsch (France) Pierre Ragues (Austria) Christian Klien	Judd HK 3.6 L V8	D	158
6	LMP2	41	(United Kingdom) Greaves Motorsport	(United Kingdom) Tom Kimber-Smith (United States) Mark Patterson (United States) Matt McMurry	Zytek Z11SN	D	158
6	LMP2	41	(United Kingdom) Greaves Motorsport	(United Kingdom) Tom Kimber-Smith (United States) Mark Patterson (United States) Matt McMurry	Nissan VK45DE 4.5 L V8	D	158
7	**LMGTE**	**55**	**(Italy) AF Corse**	**(United Kingdom) Duncan Cameron (Republic of Ireland) Matt Griffin (Italy) Michele Rugolo**	**Ferrari 458 Italia GT2**	MI	**153**
7	**LMGTE**	**55**	**(Italy) AF Corse**	**(United Kingdom) Duncan Cameron (Republic of Ireland) Matt Griffin (Italy) Michele Rugolo**	**Ferrari 4.5 L V8**	MI	**153**
8	LMGTE	81	(Switzerland) Kessel Racing	(Italy) Thomas Kemenater (Italy) Matteo Cressoni	Ferrari 458 Italia GT2	MI	153
8	LMGTE	81	(Switzerland) Kessel Racing	(Italy) Thomas Kemenater (Italy) Matteo Cressoni	Ferrari 4.5 L V8	MI	153
9	LMGTE	66	(United Kingdom) JMW Motorsport	(United Kingdom) Daniel McKenzie (United Kingdom) George Richardson (United Kingdom) Rob Bell	Ferrari 458 Italia GT2	MI	153
9	LMGTE	66	(United Kingdom) JMW Motorsport	(United Kingdom) Daniel McKenzie (United Kingdom) George Richardson (United Kingdom) Rob Bell	Ferrari 4.5 L V8	MI	153
10	LMGTE	56	(Austria) AT Racing	(Belarus) Alexander Talkanitsa, Sr. (Belarus) Alexander Talkanitsa, Jr. (Germany) Pierre Kaffer	Ferrari 458 Italia GT2	MI	153
10	LMGTE	56	(Austria) AT Racing	(Belarus) Alexander Talkanitsa, Sr. (Belarus) Alexander Talkanitsa, Jr. (Germany) Pierre Kaffer	Ferrari 4.5 L V8	MI	153
11	LMGTE	54	(Italy) AF Corse	(Italy) Piergiuseppe Perazzini (Italy) Marco Cioci (United Kingdom) Michael Lyons	Ferrari 458 Italia GT2	MI	153
11	LMGTE	54	(Italy) AF Corse	(Italy) Piergiuseppe Perazzini (Italy) Marco Cioci (United Kingdom) Michael Lyons	Ferrari 4.5 L V8	MI	153
12	LMGTE	72	(Russia) SMP Racing	(Italy) Andrea Bertolini (Russia) Viktor Shaitar (Russia) Sergey Zlobin	Ferrari 458 Italia GT2	MI	153
12	LMGTE	72	(Russia) SMP Racing	(Italy) Andrea Bertolini (Russia) Viktor Shaitar (Russia) Sergey Zlobin	Ferrari 4.5 L V8	MI	153
13	LMGTE	85	(United Kingdom) Gulf Racing UK	(Germany) Roald Goethe (United Kingdom) Stuart Hall (United Kingdom) Dan Brown	Aston Martin V8 Vantage GTE	MI	152
13	LMGTE	85	(United Kingdom) Gulf Racing UK	(Germany) Roald Goethe (United Kingdom) Stuart Hall (United Kingdom) Dan Brown	Aston Martin 4.5 L V8	MI	152
14	LMGTE	70	(Italy) AF Corse	(France) Yannick Mollegol (France) François Perrodo (France) Emmanuel Collard	Ferrari 458 Italia GT2	MI	151
14	LMGTE	70	(Italy) AF Corse	(France) Yannick Mollegol (France) François Perrodo (France) Emmanuel Collard	Ferrari 4.5 L V8	MI	151
15	**GTC**	**71**	**(Russia) SMP Racing**	**(Russia) Kirill Ladygin (Italy) Luca Persiani (Russia) Aleksey Basov**	**Ferrari 458 Italia GT3**	MI	**151**
15	**GTC**	**71**	**(Russia) SMP Racing**	**(Russia) Kirill Ladygin (Italy) Luca Persiani (Russia) Aleksey Basov**	**Ferrari 4.5 L V8**	MI	**151**
16	GTC	73	(Russia) SMP Racing	(Monaco) Olivier Beretta (Russia) Anton Ladygin (Russia) David Markozov	Ferrari 458 Italia GT3	MI	150
16	GTC	73	(Russia) SMP Racing	(Monaco) Olivier Beretta (Russia) Anton Ladygin (Russia) David Markozov	Ferrari 4.5 L V8	MI	150
17	GTC	95	(Italy) AF Corse	(Netherlands) Adrien De Leneer (Monaco) Cédric Sbirrazzuoli	Ferrari 458 Italia GT3	MI	150
17	GTC	95	(Italy) AF Corse	(Netherlands) Adrien De Leneer (Monaco) Cédric Sbirrazzuoli	Ferrari 4.5 L V8	MI	150
18	LMGTE	86	(United Kingdom) Gulf Racing UK	(United Kingdom) Michael Wainwright (United Kingdom) Adam Carroll (United Kingdom) Michael Meadows	Porsche 997 GT3 RSR	MI	149
18	LMGTE	86	(United Kingdom) Gulf Racing UK	(United Kingdom) Michael Wainwright (United Kingdom) Adam Carroll (United Kingdom) Michael Meadows	Porsche 4.0 L Flat-6	MI	149
19	GTC	99	(France) ART Grand Prix	(Mexico) Ricardo González (Switzerland) Karim Ajlani (United Kingdom) Alex Brundle	McLaren MP4-12C GT3	MI	149
19	GTC	99	(France) ART Grand Prix	(Mexico) Ricardo González (Switzerland) Karim Ajlani (United Kingdom) Alex Brundle	McLaren 3.8 L Turbo V8	MI	149
20	LMGTE	58	(France) Team Sofrev-ASP	(France) Anthony Pons (France) Soheil Ayari (France) Fabien Barthez	Ferrari 458 Italia GT2	MI	149
20	LMGTE	58	(France) Team Sofrev-ASP	(France) Anthony Pons (France) Soheil Ayari (France) Fabien Barthez	Ferrari 4.5 L V8	MI	149
21	LMGTE	77	(Germany) Proton Competition	(Austria) Horst Felbermayr, Sr. (Austria) Horst Felbermayr, Jr. (Austria) Richard Lietz	Porsche 997 GT3-RSR	MI	149
21	LMGTE	77	(Germany) Proton Competition	(Austria) Horst Felbermayr, Sr. (Austria) Horst Felbermayr, Jr. (Austria) Richard Lietz	Porsche 4.0 L Flat-6	MI	149
22	GTC	98	(France) ART Grand Prix	(Estonia) Kevin Korjus (France) Grégoire Demoustier (France) Yann Goudy	McLaren MP4-12C GT3	MI	148
22	GTC	98	(France) ART Grand Prix	(Estonia) Kevin Korjus (France) Grégoire Demoustier (France) Yann Goudy	McLaren 3.8 L Turbo V8	MI	148
23	GTC	93	(France) Pro GT by Almeras	(France) Franck Perera (France) Henry Hassid (France) Matthieu Vaxivière	Porsche 997 GT3 R	MI	148
23	GTC	93	(France) Pro GT by Almeras	(France) Franck Perera (France) Henry Hassid (France) Matthieu Vaxivière	Porsche 4.0 L Flat-6	MI	148
24	GTC	63	(Italy) AF Corse	(Denmark) Mads Radsmussen (Russia) Ilya Melnikov	Ferrari 458 Italia GT3	MI	148
24	GTC	63	(Italy) AF Corse	(Denmark) Mads Radsmussen (Russia) Ilya Melnikov	Ferrari 4.5 L V8	MI	148
25	GTC	75	(Belgium) Prospeed Competition	(Netherlands) Paul Van Splunteren (France) Mike Parisy (France) Gilles Vannelet	Porsche 997 GT3 R	MI	148
25	GTC	75	(Belgium) Prospeed Competition	(Netherlands) Paul Van Splunteren (France) Mike Parisy (France) Gilles Vannelet	Porsche 4.0 L Flat-6	MI	148
26	GTC	57	(Russia) SMP Racing	(Russia) Boris Rotenberg (Finland) Mika Salo (Italy) Maurizio Mediani	Ferrari 458 Italia GT3	MI	147
26	GTC	57	(Russia) SMP Racing	(Russia) Boris Rotenberg (Finland) Mika Salo (Italy) Maurizio Mediani	Ferrari 4.5 L V8	MI	147
27	LMGTE	67	(France) IMSA Performance Matmut	(France) Erik Maris (France) Jean-Marc Merlin (France) Éric Hélary	Porsche 997 GT3-RSR	MI	147
27	LMGTE	67	(France) IMSA Performance Matmut	(France) Erik Maris (France) Jean-Marc Merlin (France) Éric Hélary	Porsche 4.0 L Flat-6	MI	147
28	GTC	59	(France) Team Sofrev-ASP	(France) Christophe Bourret (France) Jean-Luc Beaubelique (France) Jean-Philippe Belloc	Ferrari 458 Italia GT3	MI	146
28	GTC	59	(France) Team Sofrev-ASP	(France) Christophe Bourret (France) Jean-Luc Beaubelique (France) Jean-Philippe Belloc	Ferrari 4.5 L V8	MI	146
29	LMP2	29	(Germany) Pegasus Racing	(France) Julien Schell (Austria) Niki Leutwiler (United Kingdom) Jonathan Coleman	Morgan LMP2	D	142
29	LMP2	29	(Germany) Pegasus Racing	(France) Julien Schell (Austria) Niki Leutwiler (United Kingdom) Jonathan Coleman	Nissan VK45DE 4.5 L V8	D	142
30	GTC	60	(Denmark) Formula Racing	(Denmark) Jan Magnussen (Denmark) Johnny Laursen (Denmark) Mikkel Mac	Ferrari 458 Italia GT3	MI	125
30	GTC	60	(Denmark) Formula Racing	(Denmark) Jan Magnussen (Denmark) Johnny Laursen (Denmark) Mikkel Mac	Ferrari 4.5 L V8	MI	125
DNF	LMGTE	76	(France) IMSA Performance Matmut	(France) Raymond Narac (France) Nicolas Armindo (Denmark) Christina Nielsen	Porsche 997 GT3-RSR	MI	107
DNF	LMGTE	76	(France) IMSA Performance Matmut	(France) Raymond Narac (France) Nicolas Armindo (Denmark) Christina Nielsen	Porsche 4.0 L Flat-6	MI	107
DNF	LMP2	46	(France) Thiriet by TDS Racing	(France) Pierre Thiriet (France) Ludovic Badey (France) Tristan Gommendy	Ligier JS P2	D	40
DNF	LMP2	46	(France) Thiriet by TDS Racing	(France) Pierre Thiriet (France) Ludovic Badey (France) Tristan Gommendy	Nissan VK45DE 4.5 L V8	D	40
DNF	GTC	78	Team Russia by Barwell	(Russia) Leo Machitski (Russia) Timur Sardarov (United Kingdom) Jonny Cocker	BMW Z4 GT3	MI	2
DNF	GTC	78	Team Russia by Barwell	(Russia) Leo Machitski (Russia) Timur Sardarov (United Kingdom) Jonny Cocker	BMW 4.4 L V8	MI	2

European Le Mans Series
Previous race: 4 Hours of Imola	2014 season	Next race: 4 Hours of Paul Ricard
