= Morand Racing =

Auto racing team

- Founded: 2000 (as PoleVision Racing); 2012 (as Morand Racing)
- Team principal(s): Benoît Morand
- Current series: FIA World Endurance Championship
- Former series: Formula Lista; Formula BMW USA; V8Star Series; Radical European Masters; Formula Le Mans; European Le Mans Series; Intercontinental Le Mans Cup
- Current drivers: (Mexico) Ricardo González (Brazil) Bruno Senna (Portugal) Filipe Albuquerque

Morand Racing is an auto racing team founded by former racing driver Benoît Morand and based in the Swiss town of Marly, Fribourg. The team traces its origins to 2000 when Morand founded PoleVision Racing which competed in numerous open-wheel series before switching to sports cars until 2011. The team was reformed as Morand Racing in 2012, and has competed in the European Le Mans Series since 2013 with a Morgan Le Mans Prototype.

In 2015, Morand formed a partnership with the Japanese SARD organization to compete in the FIA World Endurance Championship, expanding the team to two Morgan prototypes.

For the 2016 season, Morand partnered with Mexican driver Ricardo González to form "RGR Sport by Morand", driving the new Ligier JS P2. The team won the opening round of the championship at Silverstone. At their home race, the 6 Hours of Mexico, they obtained victory, the pole position, and the fastest lap.

== Racing record ==
=== Complete FIA World Endurance Championship results ===
Year	Team	Class	Car	Engine	1	2	3	4	5	6	7	8	9	Rank	Points
2015	(Switzerland) Team SARD Morand	LMP2	Morgan LMP2 Evo	SARD (Judd) 3.6 L V8	SIL	SPA; 3	LMS; Ret	NÜR; 4	COA; 5	FUJ; 5	SHA; 4	BHR; 2		5th	70
2016	(Mexico) RGR Sport by Morand	LMP2	Ligier JS P2	Nissan VK45DE 4.5 L V8	SIL; 1	SPA; 4	LMS; 6	NÜR; 2	MEX; 1	COA; 2	FUJ; 2	SHA; 3	BHR; 2	2nd	169

* Season still in progress.

=== 24 Hours of Le Mans results ===
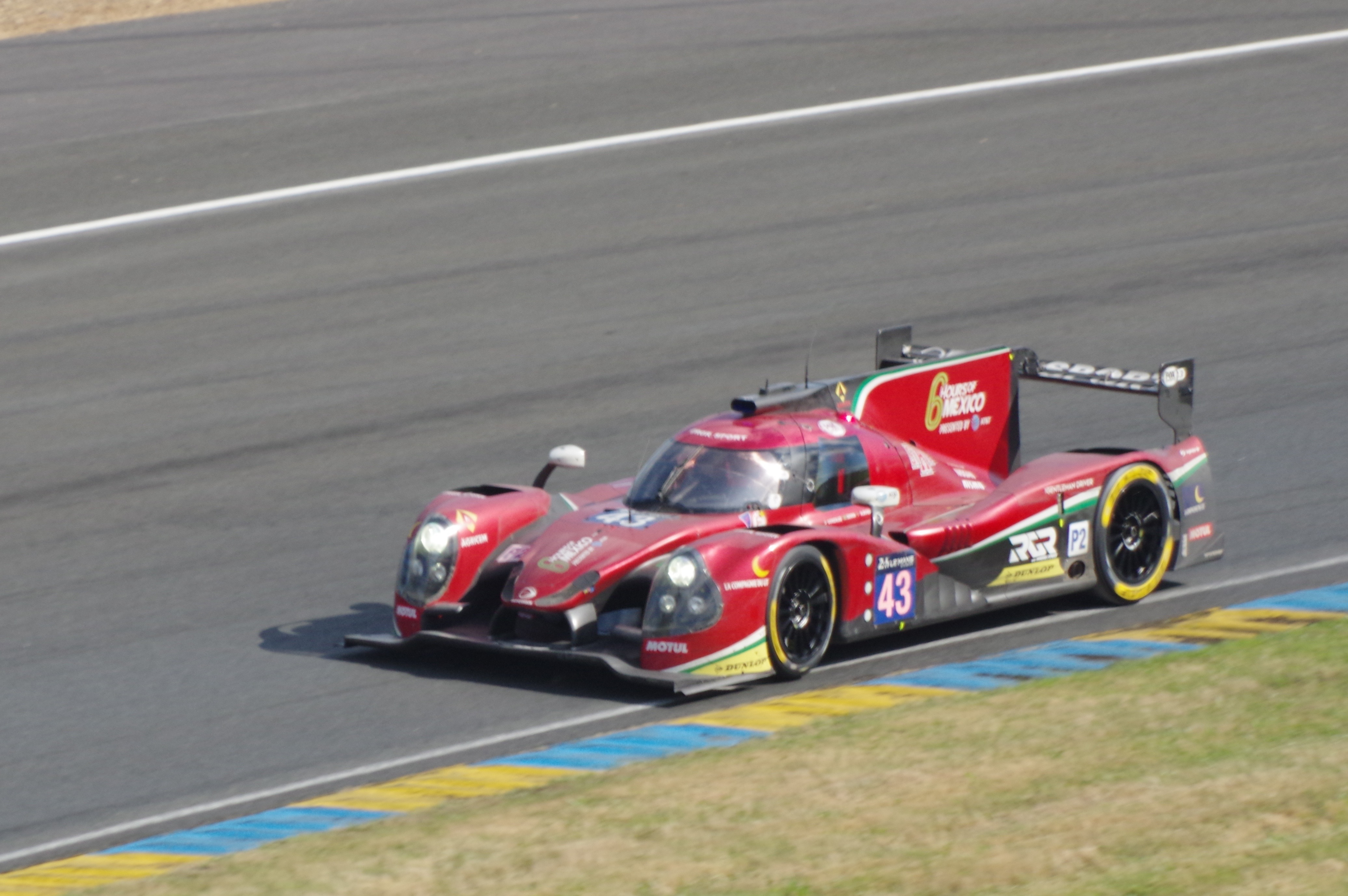
RGR Sport by Morand at the 2016 24 Hours of Le Mans.

Year	Entrant	No.	Car	Drivers	Class	Laps	Pos.	Class Pos.
2011	(Switzerland) Hope Racing	5	Oreca 01-Swiss HyTech	(Denmark) Casper Elgaard (Netherlands) Jan Lammers (Switzerland) Steve Zacchia	LMP1	115	DNF	DNF
2013	(Switzerland) Morand Racing	43	Morgan LMP2-Judd	(Switzerland) Natacha Gachnang (France) Olivier Lombard (France) Franck Mailleux	LMP2	320	11th	5th
2014	(Switzerland) Newblood by Morand Racing	43	Morgan LMP2-Judd	(France) Romain Brandela (Switzerland) Gary Hirsch (Austria) Christian Klien	LMP2	352	10th	6th
2015	(Switzerland) Team SARD Morand	43	Morgan LMP2 Evo-SARD	(Switzerland) Zoël Amberg (France) Pierre Ragues (United Kingdom) Oliver Webb	LMP2	162	DNF	DNF
2016	(Mexico) RGR Sport by Morand	43	Ligier JS P2-Nissan	(Portugal) Filipe Albuquerque (Mexico) Ricardo González (Brazil) Bruno Senna	LMP2	344	15th	10th
