= Journey to Le Mans =

2014 British documentary film by Charlotte Fantelli

- Original DVD cover
- Directed by: Charlotte Fantelli
- Written by: Charlotte Fantelli
- Based on: 24 Hours of Le Mans, 2014
- Produced by: Charlotte Fantelli
- Starring: Simon Dolan; Oliver Turvey; Harry Tincknell; Allan McNish; Mark Webber; Filipe Albuquerque; Bob Friend; Marc Gené; Sam Hignett; John Hindhaugh; Pete Webster
- Narrated by: Sir Patrick Stewart; Tiff Needell
- Cinematography: Stuart Keasley; Adam Parkes
- Edited by: Laura Johnson
- Music by: Phil Mountford
- Production company: Fantelli Productions
- Distributed by: Kaleidoscope Home Entertainment; Content Media
- Release date: 23 October 2014 (London)
- Running time: 96 minutes
- Country: United Kingdom
- Language: English

Journey to Le Mans is a 2014 British documentary film directed by Charlotte Fantelli about British Privateer Team Jota Sport on their bid to win the 24 Hours of Le Mans in the LMP2 category in 2014. This film represents Charlotte Fantelli's directorial debut.

== Story ==
The film tells the story of racing driver and entrepreneur Simon Dolan and the rest of his motorsport team Jota Sport, following the highs and lows the team encountered.

== Cast ==
The film is narrated by Patrick Stewart and Tiff Needell with commentary from Radio Le Mans. As well as featuring Simon Dolan, the film also focuses on his teammates Oliver Turvey and Harry Tincknell, plus guest stars Harry's mentor, three time Le Mans winner Allan McNish and ex Formula One driver Mark Webber, and appearances by Filipe Albuquerque, Bob Friend, Marc Gené, Sam Hignett, John Hindhaugh, and Pete Webster.

== Production ==
Talking about the making of the film, Fantelli described the minimal sleep, effort and sacrifices she made to ensure that the film was completed. Fantelli's ambition was for Journey to Le Mans to portray a more accurate representation of what it feels like to be a racer, examining both the physical and mental pressures experienced by not only the drivers but their teams as well. The team's Jota LMP2 car uses a Nismo tuned Nissan engine and reaches a top speed of more than 180 mph.

== Distribution ==
Journey to Le Mans was released in a limited number of cinemas across the United Kingdom for one night only, which included a Q&A with cast and crew. The DVD was released 14 November by Kaleidoscope Home Entertainment, while a director's cut of the documentary was broadcast on the ITV4 television channel on 4 December 2014.
