= Simon Dolan =

British businessman and investor (born 1969)

- Born: Simon James Dolan; 20 May 1969 (age 57); Chelmsford, Essex, England
- Occupation: Entrepreneur
- Known for: Sports car racing, investments, political activism
- Website: https://www.simon-dolan.com

Simon James Dolan (born 20 May 1969) is a British businessman and investor who made his fortune through accountancy services. Since 2020, he has opposed measures by the United Kingdom government linked to the COVID-19 pandemic and has made legal challenges to government decisions. Dolan competed as an amateur driver in international sports car racing, recording a class win at the 24 Hours of Le Mans in 2014.

== Career ==
Dolan claims that he was "thrown out of school at 16 with virtually no qualifications" and sold cheese and eggs at a market which taught him "the gift-of-the-gab, commitment to hard graft and strong arithmetic" Dolan placed an advertisement offering accountancy services which led to the establishment of SJD Accountancy in Berkhamsted in 1997. In 1999, Dolan also set up Contractor Umbrella Ltd. SJD Accountancy was acquired in 2014 along with accounting practice Nixon Williams by Sovereign Capital for over £100 million.

Dolan began investing in start-up companies via Twitter in 2010, initially offering a £5 million investment pot for successful business pitches on the social networking site, earning himself the nickname "Twitter Dragon".

In 2014, entrepreneur Simon Dolan invested into The PHA Group. Dolan was a former client of The PHA Group and became a Director and Shareholder.

Dolan established Dolan Accountancy in 2017. Dolan Accountancy was the winner in the Best Contractor Accountant (under 1,000 clients) category in the 2019 Contracting Awards.

According to The Sunday Times Rich List in 2020, Dolan is worth £200 million.

== Political activism ==
In 2020, Dolan founded Keep Britain Free, a group associated with the British anti-lockdown movement.

Dolan is the author of a book outlining the achievements of (then) former US President Donald Trump entitled Trump: the Hidden Halo that was published in April 2021 with a foreword by Nigel Farage.

=== Opposition to UK COVID-19 lockdown and judicial review ===
Dolan believes that the British government has ulterior motives for the COVID-19 lockdowns. He sees it as a way for those in power to "test how malleable a society is" in order to limit citizens' freedom, or as a way to introduce mandatory vaccinations. Dolan also referenced climate change, which he says the government has "been banging on about". He said: "What has happened will undoubtedly help [climate change campaigns], because the world has become cleaner as industries have shut down." According to Dolan, people who receive “a cheque for nothing” are the ones supporting the lockdown"

On 1 May 2020, Dolan started proceedings to challenge the UK Government's lockdown decision, suggesting the Government had acted illegally and disproportionately over the COVID-19 lockdown. He began a crowdfunding campaign to fund the proposed action, writing on the crowdfunding page: "By forcing people to stay at home, and forcing businesses to close, they are, we believe, in contravention of basic Human Rights offered under English Law, that of the right to enjoy your property peacefully." As of 10 June it had raised over £210,000 with almost 7,000 people contributing. The proceedings were opposed by The Independent Workers Union of Great Britain (IWGB) who stated, "The Independent Workers Union of Great Britain (IWGB) is applying to intervene in a High Court legal challenge brought by multi-millionaire Simon Dolan. Dolan, a conspiracy theorist and businessman based in Monaco, is attempting to force the government to prematurely end the lockdown, a move that would disproportionately impact low-paid and BAME workers."

On 6 July 2020, Dolan was refused permission for judicial review by the Honourable Mr Justice Lewis, who said that "the restrictions were imposed [during] a global pandemic where a novel, highly infectious disease capable of causing death was spreading and was transmissible between humans...There was a legal duty to review the restrictions periodically and to end the restrictions if they were no longer necessary to achieve the aim of reducing the spread and the incidence of coronavirus. The regulations would end after six months in any event. In those, possibly unique, circumstances, there is no realistic prospect that a court would find that regulations adopted to reduce the opportunity for transmission by limiting contact between individuals was disproportionate". On 9 July, Dolan launched an appeal against the decision.

Dolan's appeal against the initial decision was successful and on 5 August the Court of Appeal ruled that the challenge against the government's lockdown would continue to be heard with Lord Justice Hickinbottom who stated that he was persuaded that the grounds should be considered by the full court in open court, and the claimants "given an opportunity to make good their case, at least on arguability". Dolan's judicial review challenged the then new UK rule of a limit of six people per group otherwise known as the rule of six on 14 September. On 1 December, it was ruled that the Government should not face a Judicial Review regarding the initial lockdown measures. The court warned against treating judicial reviews as evolving or “rolling” proceedings, and parties filing “excessively long” pleadings. The court criticised Dolan and the other Appellants for taking two months to start their claim, rather than very promptly following the making of the Regulations in March 2020.

Dolan has opposed the UK government's adoption of the Pfizer vaccine. He also has claimed that requiring people to wear masks is a step toward authoritarianism, tweeting, 'Unless you make a stand, you will be wearing a mask for the rest of your life.'

In January 2021, Dolan was a cosignatory of an open letter titled 'The Chinese Communist Party's Global Lockdown Fraud', alleging pro-Chinese government bias by international scientists and officials. According to a Coda Story report, Dolan "said there was 'no doubt' that the global response to the pandemic’s origins lay within the Communist Party of China. He implied that 'pictures of people supposedly dropping dead in the streets of China' was part of a propaganda campaign by Beijing."

== Motor racing ==
24 Hours of Le Mans career
- Years: 2011–2016
- Teams: Jota Sport, G-Drive Racing
- Best finish: 5th (2014)
- Class wins: 1 (2014)
- Categorisation: FIA Silver

Dolan's interest in motor racing began in March 2007 when he started investing in Jota Sport, which he joined later in 2008 as driver. In 2010, Jota Sport signed a multi-year agreement to become an Aston Martin official partner team in motorsports. Jota initially competed in an Aston Martin V8 Vantage at the 2010 24 Hours of Spa where the team won their class. Dolan and co-driver Sam Hancock participated in the V de V Sports series with a best finish of third at Circuit Paul Ricard. Dolan made his debut at the 24 Hours of Le Mans in 2011.

Dolan's career highlight was 1st place in the LMP2 class at Le Mans in 2014 with Harry Tincknell and Oliver Turvey, who replaced Marc Gené after he was recalled to Team Joest Audi Sport LMP1 team following an accident in practice for Loic Duval.

Following a sponsorship deal with Russian energy company Gazprom, the team competed as G-Drive Racing for the 2016 European Le Mans Series following a transfer of naming rights. Racing in a Gibson 015S, Dolan and G-Drive's season got underway at Silverstone Circuit, United Kingdom, in April, where they recorded their opening win of the season in the LMP2 category. The victory was followed up with a runners-up finish at the following race at Imola, in May 2016. The team's good performance continued throughout the season and was capped with a victory in the final race of the season at Estoril, in Portugal. The victory secured the 2016 European Le Mans Series title for G-Drive Racing. Dolan topped the Drivers' classification alongside teammates Giedo Van Der Garde and Harry Tincknell, all securing 105 points.

=== Journey to Le Mans ===
Dolan was the focus of a 2014 British film, directed by Dolan's business partner Charlotte Fantelli, that followed Jota Sport on their quest to win the 24 Hours of Le Mans in the LMP2 category in 2014. The film followed Dolan and his Jota Sport teammates on their way to victory.

=== Racing results ===
==== 24 Hours of Le Mans results ====
| Year | Team | Co-Drivers | Car | Class | Laps | Pos. | Class Pos. |
|---|---|---|---|---|---|---|---|
| 2011 | (United Kingdom) Jota | (United Kingdom) Sam Hancock (United Kingdom) Chris Buncombe | Aston Martin V8 Vantage GT2 | GTE; Pro | 74 | DNF | DNF |
| 2012 | (United Kingdom) Jota | (United Kingdom) Sam Hancock (Japan) Haruki Kurosawa | Zytek Z11SN-Nissan | LMP2 | 271 | DNF | DNF |
| 2013 | (United Kingdom) Jota Sport | (United Kingdom) Oliver Turvey (Germany) Lucas Luhr | Zytek Z11SN-Nissan | LMP2 | 319 | 13th | 7th |
| 2014 | (United Kingdom) Jota Sport | (United Kingdom) Oliver Turvey (United Kingdom) Harry Tincknell | Zytek Z11SN-Nissan | LMP2 | 356 | 5th | **1st** |
| 2015 | (United Kingdom) Jota Sport | (United Kingdom) Oliver Turvey (New Zealand) Mitch Evans | Gibson 015S-Nissan | LMP2 | 358 | 10th | **2nd** |
| 2016 | (Russia) G-Drive Racing | (United Kingdom) Jake Dennis (Netherlands) Giedo van der Garde | Gibson 015S-Nissan | LMP2 | 222 | DNF | DNF |

==== Complete European Le Mans Series results ====
(key) (Races in bold indicate pole position; races in italics indicate fastest lap)

| Year | Entrant | Class | Chassis | Engine | 1 | 2 | 3 | 4 | 5 | 6 | Rank | Points |
|---|---|---|---|---|---|---|---|---|---|---|---|---|
| 2012 | Jota | LMP2 | Zytek Z11SN | Nissan VK45DE 4.5 L V8 | LEC; 9 | DON; Ret | ATL | | | | 16th | 2 |
| 2013 | Jota Sport | LMP2 | Zytek Z11SN | Nissan VK45DE 4.5 L V8 | SIL; 1 | IMO; Ret | RBR; 4 | HUN; 3 | LEC; 3 | | 3rd | 71 |
| 2014 | Jota Sport | LMP2 | Zytek Z11SN | Nissan VK45DE 4.5 L V8 | SIL; Ret | IMO; 1 | RBR; 2 | LEC; 4 | EST; 3 | | 2nd | 74 |
| 2015 | Jota Sport | LMP2 | Gibson 015S | Nissan VK45DE 4.5 L V8 | SIL; 2 | IMO; 3 | RBR; 1 | LEC; 3 | EST; 4 | | 3rd | 89 |
| 2016 | G-Drive Racing | LMP2 | Gibson 015S | Nissan VK45DE 4.5 L V8 | SIL; 1 | IMO; 2 | RBR; 3 | LEC; 5 | SPA; 5 | EST; 1 | 1st | 103 |

== Personal life ==
Dolan is a car enthusiast. His collection includes a Pagani Zonda, a Koenigsegg One:1 and a 2010 Ferrari F1 Car.

Dolan owns numerous properties: apartments in Monaco and Amsterdam, a villa in Mustique once owned by David Bowie, a chateau in southwest France and an estate in Las Vegas. In January 2024, the Las Vegas property was put on sale for US$24.5 million.

Dolan is a Bowie enthusiast, also owning the Gibson Les Paul Custom used by Mick Ronson on his works with Bowie, including The Rise and Fall of Ziggy Stardust and the Spiders From Mars.

Sporting positions
| Preceded by Jon Lancaster; Björn Wirdheim; Gary Hirsch | European Le Mans Series; LMP2 Champion; 2016; With: Giedo van der Garde & Harry Tincknell | Succeeded by Memo Rojas; Leo Roussel |
