= Hignett =

Hignett or Hignet is a surname. Notable people with the surname include:

- Alan Hignett (born 1946), English footballer
- Craig Hignett (born 1970), English footballer
- John Hignett (1900–1994), English Equerry to Edward VIII
- Mary Hignett (1915–1980), British actress
- Mathilde Hignet (born 1993), French politician
- Richard Hignett (born 1972), English cricketer
- Sam Hignett (1885 – c. 1933), English footballer
