= Charlotte Fantelli =

British entrepreneur and filmmaker

Charlotte Fantelli is a British entrepreneur and filmmaker.

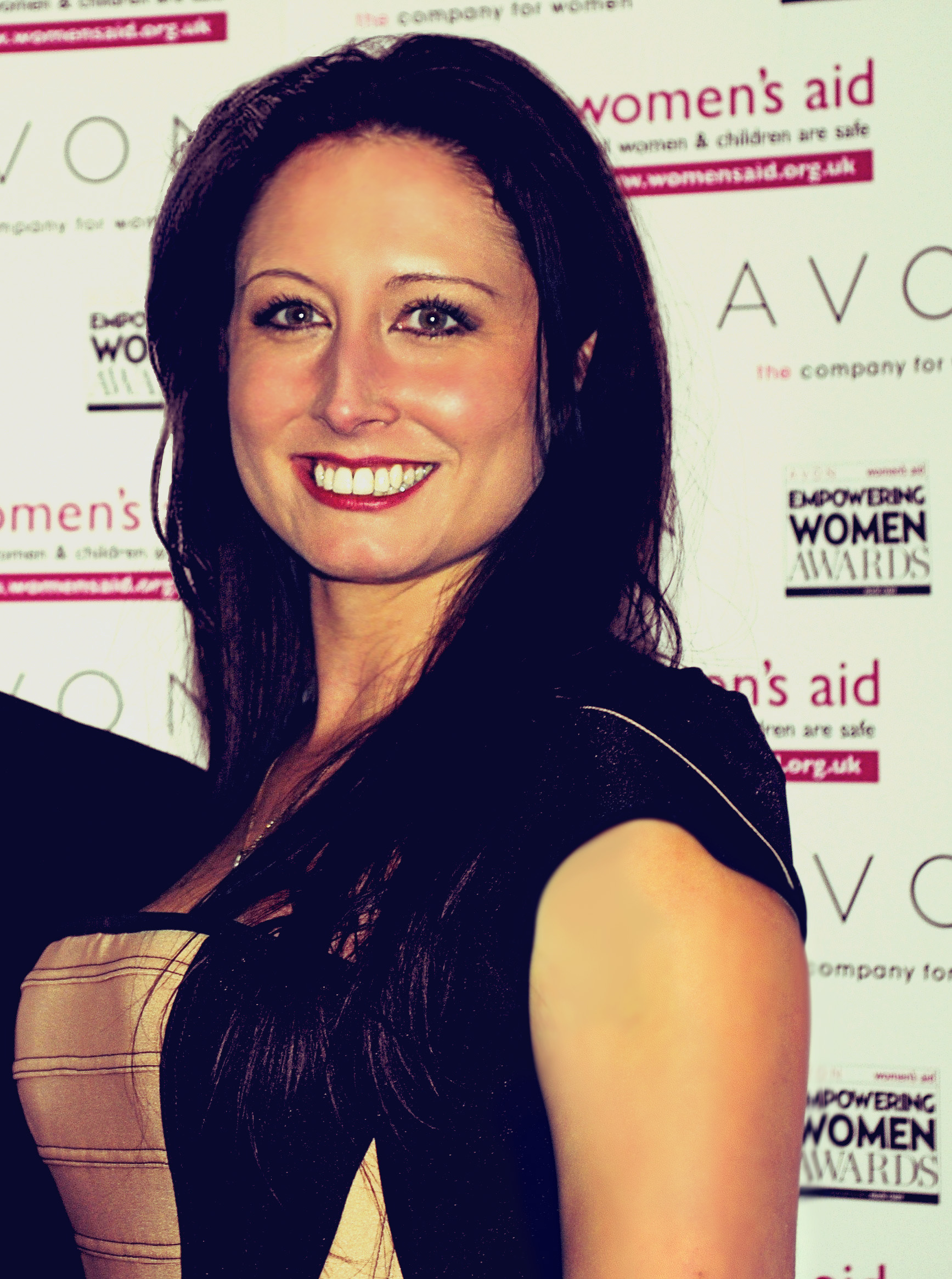
Charlotte Fantelli at the Avon Awards.

== Entrepreneurship and awards ==
Fantelli founded Uncovered in 2010, a bimonthly magazine on mental health and wellbeing, using seed capital from entrepreneur Simon Dolan. This led to her being shortlisted for the 2011 Women of the Future Awards in the Entrepreneur category. The print magazine ceased publication in April 2011 after four issues.

Fantelli was among the winners of the Women's Aid charity's 2012 Empowering Women Awards for her work with domestic violence and mental health.

Charlotte now runs production company Branded Studios, which specialises in male skewing documentary films.

== Film ==
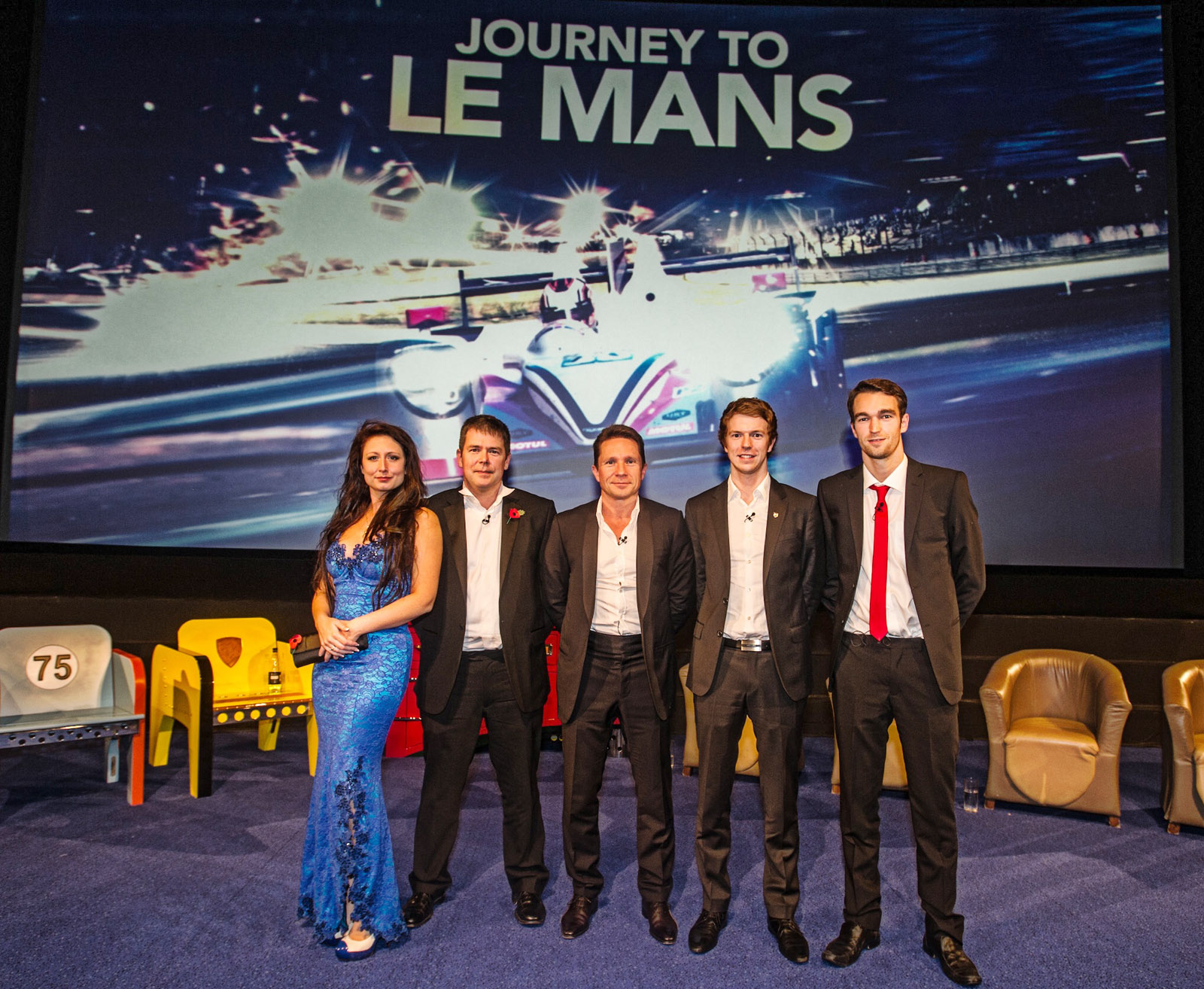
Journey to Le Mans premiere at Vue cinema Leicester Square

In 2014 Fantelli's first feature film Journey to Le Mans was released, The film tells the story of British team Jota Sport's bid for success in its class in the Le Mans 24-hour race. It was first broadcast on ITV in the United Kingdom and premiered at London’s Leicester Square before screening at cinemas across the UK. The documentary is narrated by Patrick Stewart. Journey to Le Mans was Fantelli's first production and she had to teach herself film-making as well as raise the funds required to finance it.

Charlotte was Associate Producer of Le Mans feature film Gentleman Driver, released in 2019 on Netflix.

In June 2020 Charlotte was credited as Co-Executive Producer of Becoming Rocky (international title 40 Years of Rocky) released by her company Branded Studios the official documentary on the creation of Rocky, narrated by Sylvester Stallone. She is also credited as Co-Executive Producer on the 2021 documentary Stallone, Frank That Is on Frank Stallone, Sylvester's younger brother.

Fantelli produced and directed Another Way, a documentary about the effect COVID-19 has had on the arts and directed Access All Areas, a 2022 film about disabled rights activist Simon Samsone.

In 2022 Fantelli Directed and Produced Hunt Vs Lauda; The Next Generation starring Freddie Hunt and Mathias Lauda, sons of Niki Lauda and James Hunt. She is now attached to Car and Country series 2, to be released by Branded Studios in 2023 airing on Amazon Prime.

== Publications ==
Fantelli has had articles published on topics such as psychopathy, criminology, psychology, relationships and sexuality on her own and other websites. Her writing on abortion was published as part of the national education curriculum in the United Kingdom.

In March 2023 she was featured in a ten page spread in FHM Magazine and appeared on the cover of FHM Sweden.

== Personal ==
Fantelli was born on 31 January 1984, in Stroud, Gloucestershire in the United Kingdom.
