= 2014 24 Hours of Le Mans =

82nd 24 Hours of Le Mans endurance race

Previous: 2013	Next: 2015
Index: Races | Winners

Circuit de la Sarthe track

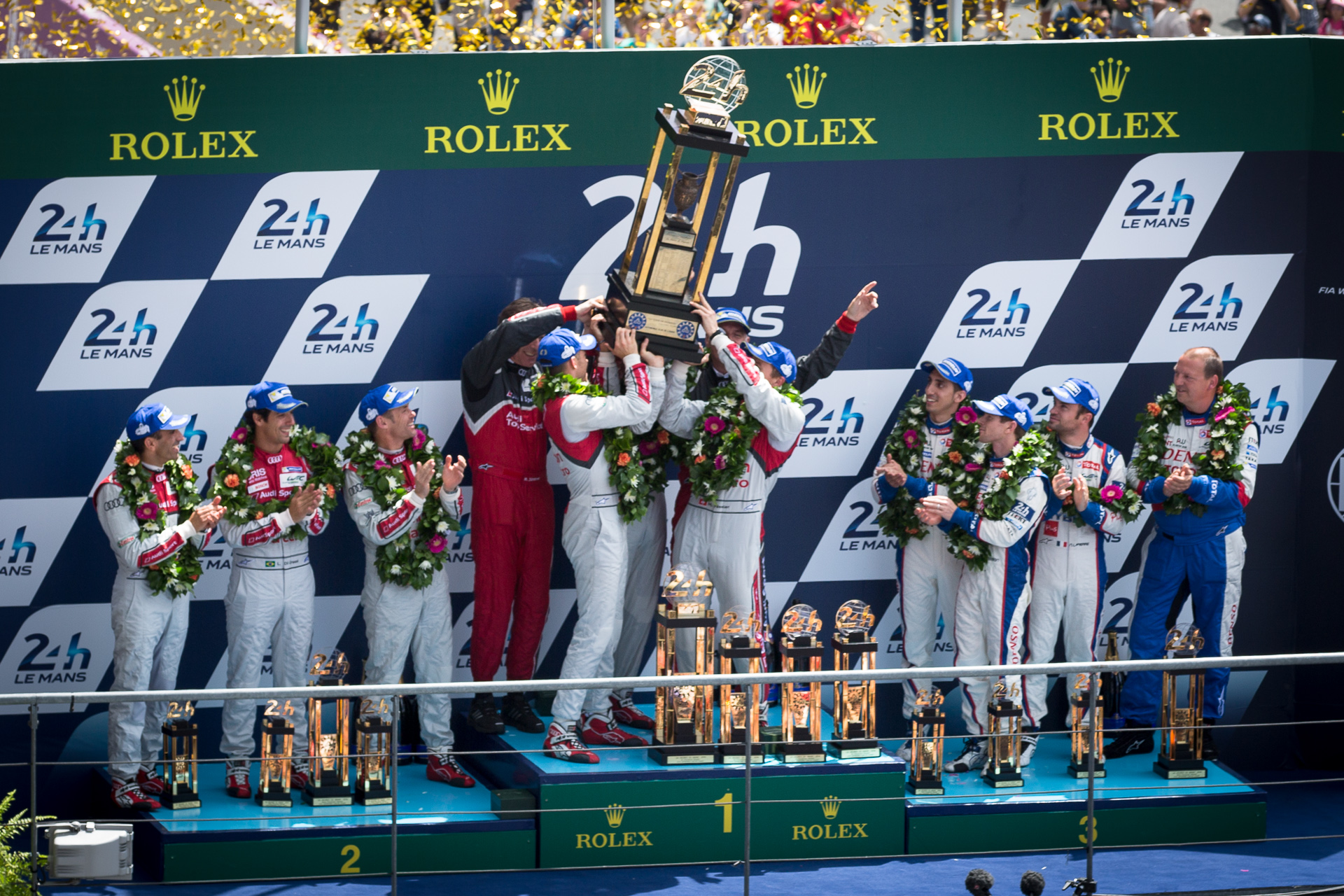
Marcel Fässler, André Lotterer, and Benoît Tréluyer hoist the winners trophy during the podium ceremony

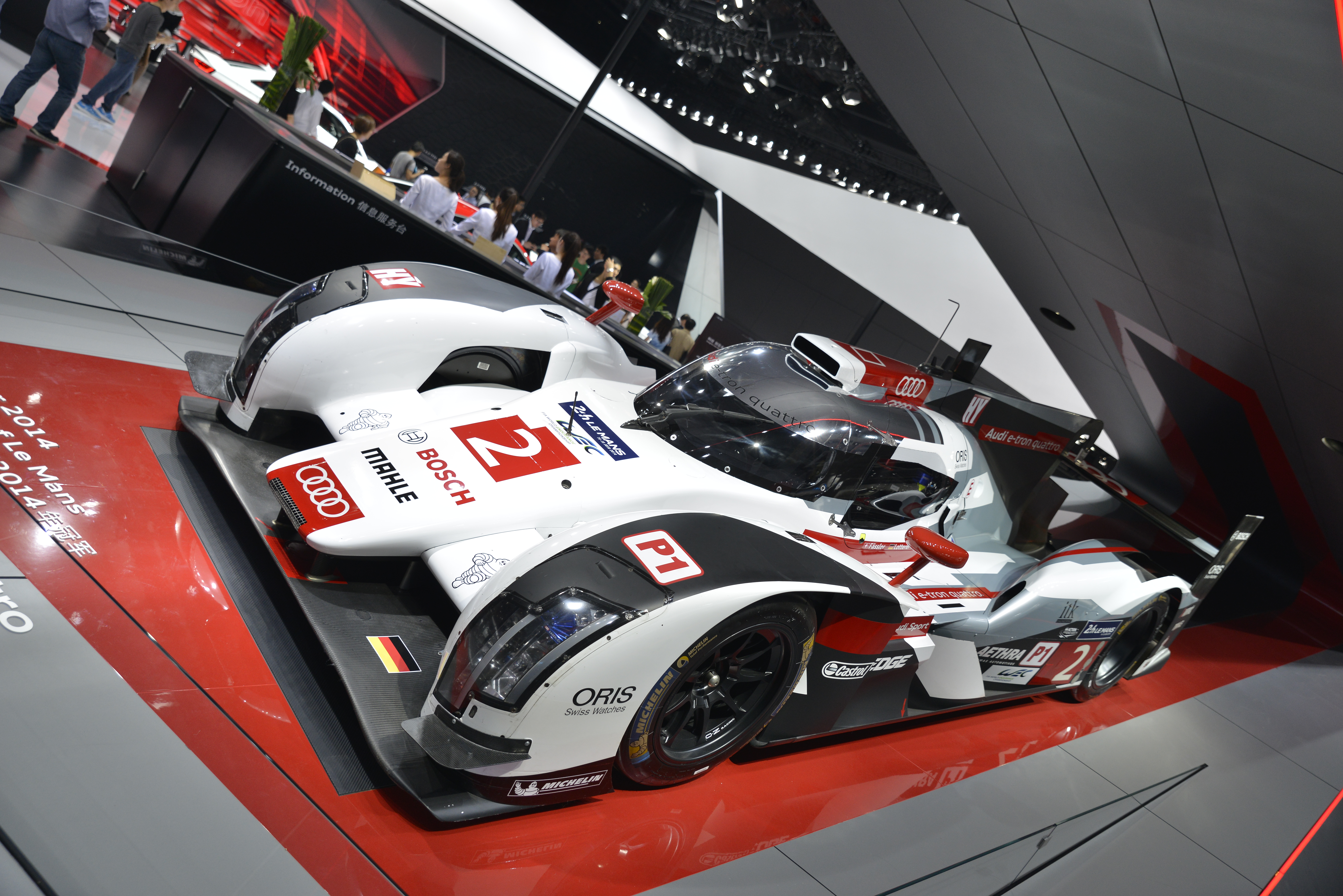
Audi Sport Team Joest No. 2 Audi R18 e-tron quattro, Winner of the 2014 24 Hours of Le Mans

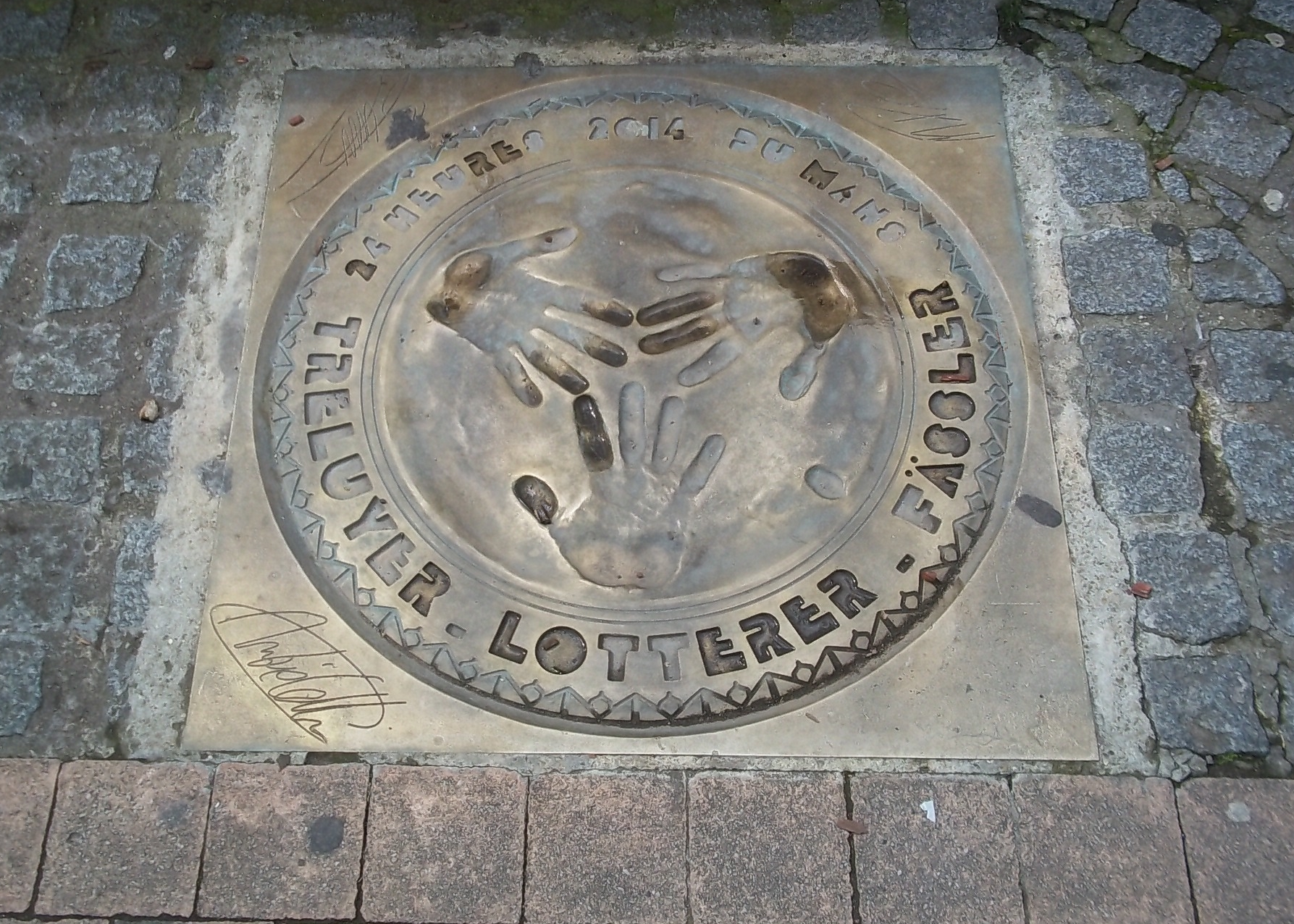
Handprint's Winners 2014 in the Walk of fame at Le Mans

The 82nd 24 Hours of Le Mans (French: 82^{e} 24 Heures du Mans) was an 24-hour automobile endurance racing event for teams of three drivers entering Le Mans Prototype and Le Mans Grand Touring Endurance cars held from 11 to 15 June 2014 at the Circuit de la Sarthe close to Le Mans, France. It was the 82nd running of the event, as organized by the Automobile Club de l'Ouest (ACO) since 1923. The race was the third round and the premier event of the 2014 FIA World Endurance Championship, with half of the race's fifty-five entries contesting the championship. Approximately 263,000 spectators attended the event, the largest crowd since 1989.

The race was won by an Audi R18 e-tron quattro driven by Swiss Marcel Fässler, German André Lotterer, and Frenchman Benoît Tréluyer, who previously won Le Mans as a trio in 2011 and 2012. This victory was Audi's thirteenth since the company debuted at the race in 1999. The Audi team took the lead after a Toyota TS040 Hybrid came to a stop after leading half the race distance, but were challenged by Porsche when two Audi cars required turbocharger replacements. The second of Tom Kristensen, Marc Gené and Lucas di Grassi finished in second place, three laps behind the race winners, while Anthony Davidson, Sébastien Buemi and Nicolas Lapierre's No. 8 Toyota recovered from an accident in the first hour to finish in third place.

The (Le Mans Prototype 1-Lightweight) LMP1-L category was won by the Rebellion Racing Rebellion-Toyota of Nick Heidfeld, Mathias Beche, and Nico Prost, the sole finisher in the class. The Le Mans Prototype 2 (LMP2) class finished with the Jota Sport Zytek-Nissan of Simon Dolan, Oliver Turvey, and Harry Tincknell ahead of the TDS Racing Ligier-Nissan by less than a lap's distance. The AF Corse team fielding a Ferrari 458 Italia GT2 won the Le Mans Grand Touring Endurance Professional (LMGTE Pro) category with drivers Gianmaria Bruni, Giancarlo Fisichella, and Toni Vilander, while the Le Mans Grand Touring Endurance Amateur (LMGTE Am) category was won by Aston Martin Racing's trio of Danish drivers: David Heinemeier Hansson, Kristian Poulsen, and Nicki Thiim.

The result meant Davidson, Lapierre and Buemi remained the Drivers' Championship leaders with 80 points while Fässler, Tréluyer and Lotterer's victory enabled them to move into second on 60 points and di Grassi and Kristensen remained in third place but a further six points behind. Mathias Beche, Nicolas Prost and Nick Heidfeld remained in fourth position on 42 points and Gené's second-place finish moved him to fifth place. Toyota remained the leaders of the Manufacturers' Championship, but their advantage over Audi was now a single point while Porsche maintained third position with five races left in the season.

== Schedule and pre-championship standings ==
The 2014 Le Mans schedule was moved forward one week to avoid conflicts with other major motorsports series. It was the 82nd running of the event, held at the Circuit de la Sarthe, near Le Mans in Northwest France from 14 to 15 June 2014, and the third of eight scheduled rounds of the 2014 FIA World Endurance Championship. Before the race Toyota drivers Anthony Davidson, Sébastien Buemi and Nicolas Lapierre led the Drivers' Championship with 50 points, 16 ahead of their teammates Alexander Wurz, Stéphane Sarrazin and Kazuki Nakajima and a further 16 in front of Loïc Duval, Lucas di Grassi and Tom Kristensen. Mathias Beche, Nicolas Prost and Nick Heidfeld were fourth on 18 points and Timo Bernhard, Brendon Hartley and Mark Webber stood in fifth place with 15.5 points. Toyota were leading the Manufacturers' Championship with 84 points, 48 ahead of their rival Porsche in second; the third-placed Manufacturer Audi had scored 28 points. Toyota had so far dominated the championship, winning the season's previous two races. Wurz, Sarrazin and Nakajima along with Duval, di Grassi and Kristensen had finished in second once and Bernhard, Hartley, Webber along with Wurz, Sarrazin and Nakajima had both secured third-place podium finishes.

== Circuit and regulation changes ==
Layout of the Circuit de la Sarthe.

Following the death of Allan Simonsen during the 2013 race, the ACO announced improvements to several sections of the circuit. Tertre Rouge was re-profiled and new barriers and tire walls were added at the corner's exit onto the Mulsanne Straight. Run-off areas in the Corvette corners were expanded, and Tecpro barriers were added behind the tire walls at the start of the Porsche corners. Large kerbs were added to the paved run-off at the second Ford chicane to deter cars from cutting the corner.

A new safety system was implemented, which allowed for the intervention of safety vehicles on a particular section of the circuit without the need for neutralising the entire race with safety cars. The system, termed a slow zone, requires cars to slow and maintain a speed of 60 km/h (37 mph) within a specific zone. Speeds within the zones were monitored by GPS systems that were required on every car. In conjunction with the slow zone procedure an onboard marshalling system warned drivers of the location of slow zones. New regulations required rookies, as well as drivers who have not competed at Le Mans in the past five years, to participate in a half-day simulator training course. The course includes examples of night and wet racing at Le Mans, as well as the new safety car and slow zone procedures.

== Entries ==
=== Automatic invitations ===
Automatic entry invitations were earned by teams that won their class in the previous running of the 24 Hours of Le Mans, or have won Le Mans-based series such as the American Le Mans Series (ALMS), European Le Mans Series (ELMS) and Asian Le Mans Series (ASLMS). Some second-place finishers were also granted automatic invitations in certain series. As with the 2013 race, the ALMS was given two designated entries rather than entries for each class. All current FIA World Endurance Championship (FIA WEC) full-season entries also automatically earned invitations. As automatic invitations were granted to teams, the teams were allowed to change their cars from the previous year to the next, but are not allowed to change their category. However, automatic invitations in the two GTE categories were able to be swapped between the two based on the driver line-ups chosen by these teams.

On 20 December 2013, the ACO published its initial list of automatic invitations. Muscle Milk Pickett Racing and Team Endurance Challenge did not take up their automatic entries; Risi Competizione also turned down its invitation, but later submitted a request for another car and was granted a reserve entry.

Automatic entries for the 2014 24 Hours of Le Mans
Reason invited	LMP1	LMP2	LMGTE Pro	LMGTE Am
1st in the 24 Hours of Le Mans	(Germany) Audi Sport Team Joest	(France) OAK Racing	(Germany) Porsche AG Team Manthey	(France) IMSA Performance Matmut
1st in the European Le Mans Series		(France) Signatech Alpine	(United Kingdom) Ram Racing	
2nd in the European Le Mans Series			(Germany) Proton Competition	
American Le Mans Series designated entries		(United States) Muscle Milk Pickett Racing	(United States) Risi Competizione	
1st in European Le Mans Series FLM category		(France) Team Endurance Challenge		
1st in the Asian Le Mans Series		(France) OAK Racing		(Italy) AF Corse
2nd in the Asian Le Mans Series				(Hong Kong) Craft Racing

=== Garage 56 ===
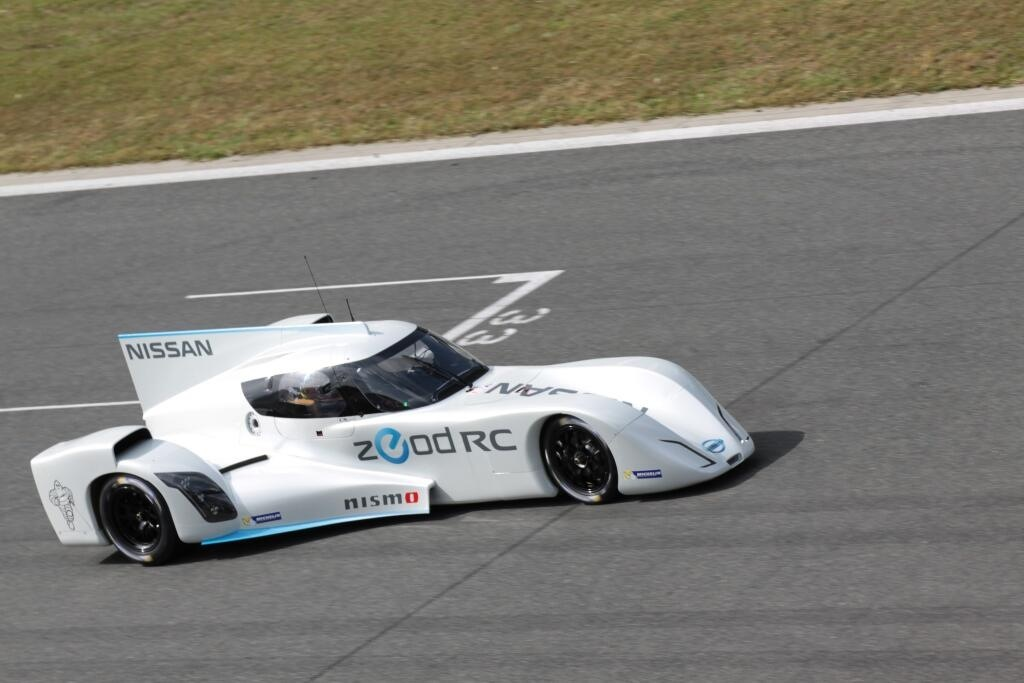
Nissan Motorsports Global No. 0 Nissan ZEOD RC

The ACO continued the Garage 56 concept, started in 2012. Garage 56 allows a 56th entry to the race, using the rigours of the 24 Hours of Le Mans to test new technology. The ACO announced during 2013 that the Nissan Motor Company's Nismo division had been granted the Garage 56 entry for 2014.

Nissan unveiled the car, known as the ZEOD RC, during the 2013 24 Hours of Le Mans weekend. The ZEOD RC was designed by Ben Bowlby, who created the 2012 Garage 56 entry DeltaWing with backing from Nissan. The ZEOD RC utilized a hybrid electric drivetrain with lithium ion battery packs in a chassis similar in design to the DeltaWing. The car featured a turbocharged three-cylinder internal combustion engine and two electric drive motors. Nissan planned to attempt a full lap of the Circuit de la Sarthe under all-electric power, a goal achieved during the pre-race warm-up session.

=== Entry list ===
In conjunction with the announcement of entries for the 2014 FIA WEC and the 2014 ELMS, the ACO announced the full list of invitations for Le Mans, plus ten reserves. In addition to the 31 guaranteed entries from the WEC, thirteen entries came from the ELMS, five from the IMSA SportsCar Championship, and two from the ASLMS, while the rest of the field was filled with one-off entries competing only at Le Mans.

Following the publication of the invitations, several teams withdrew their entries. SRT Motorsports announced that its Vipers would be withdrawn, citing concentration on the United SportsCar Championship, and bringing the manufacturers in the Le Mans Grand Touring Endurance Professional (LMGTE Pro) category down to four. JMW Motorsports' and Team Taisan's Ferrari cars were promoted to the race entry as a result. On 28 April 2014, the ACO released a revised entry list that confirmed the withdrawal of Millennium Racing's two entries, Craft Racing, and two additional Aston Martin Racing entries. Larbre Compétition, Caterham Racing, Pegasus Racing and second entries of IMSA Performance Matmut and Prospeed Competition were promoted from the reserves to the race entry.

Lotus withdrew its new LMP1-L class prototype due to a delay in completion of the car, leaving only Rebellion Racing cars in the category. Millennium Racing, which had previously withdrawn due to a delay in funding, had one entry reinstated. A week later Strakka Racing withdrew its Strakka Dome S103 after an accident in testing damaged the car, which had been planned to debut in the LMP2 category. Krohn Racing, who had initially withdrawn its joint entry with Risi Competizione from the reserve list, replaced the Strakka. The day before the start of scrutineering, Millennium Racing was unable to secure its funding and was forced to withdraw for the second time. No replacement was found.

== Testing and practice ==
A test day was held on 1 June, two weeks prior to the race, and allowed but did not require all entrants for the race to participate in eight hours of track time divided into two sessions. Krohn Racing did not attend the test due to lack of preparation, while Prospeed Competition's second car was also not entered. Millennium Racing had its race entry plus a second car entered for the test but did not arrive. AF Corse brought an additional Ferrari to allow more testing for drivers, bringing the total cars for the day to 54. Toyota set the pace of the day with a 3:23.014 lap recorded by Buemi in the second session, followed by Nakajima in the No. 7 Toyota in second. The No. 3 Audi of Marco Bonanomi was within a second of the top time. The fastest Porsche of Neel Jani was over a second and a half behind Buemi's lap. Roman Rusinov led the LMP2 class for G-Drive Racing with a 3:37.795 lap time ahead of Karun Chandhok's No. 48 Murphy Prototypes and Signatech Alpine. The LMGTE Pro category was led by Frédéric Makowiecki's Porsche with a 3:57.260 time, while the team's second car was damaged beyond repair early in the session after becoming airborne in the gravel traps of the Ford chicane. Paolo Ruberti's 8 Star Motorsports Ferrari was the fastest in LMGTE Am, and the second fastest amongst all LMGTE runners, with a 3:57.403 lap. After the test several prototype teams, including all Audi, Porsche, and Toyota cars participated in an unofficial test on the shorter Bugatti Circuit the following day to ensure car components were working efficiently before the race.

Official practice was held on 11 June with the full 54-car field on track for four hours. Toyota led from the start once again, with Davidson claiming the fastest time of the session with a 3:23.652 lap, just ahead of the No. 2 Audi. Porsche's fastest laps were nearly three seconds off the pace. Early in the session, the No. 1 Audi of Loïc Duval spun and became airborne in the Porsche Curves, impacting catch fencing above the barriers and destroying the car. Duval was able to climb from the car but was not cleared for the rest of the week by the Fédération Internationale de l'Automobile (FIA) and ACO medical teams while Audi was forced to bring in a spare chassis to replace the vehicle. He was replaced by Jota Sport driver Marc Gené with Oliver Turvey taking over the Spaniard's seat at the British team. OAK Racing's Ligier JS P2, making its racing debut, led the LMP2 category with a 3:40.611 lap time. In LMGTE, an Am class car led the field with Nicki Thiim's Aston Martin recording a 3:57.015 lap time, ahead of the LMGTE Pro AF Corse Ferrari by thirteen thousandths of a second. The experimental Nissan ZEOD RC was the only car not to set a lap time in the session after suffering mechanical failures on its first lap. A second stoppage was necessitated after Erik Maris crashed into the barrier at the first Mulsanne chicane and the session ended early when Frankie Montecalvo impacted the wall at the second chicane and debris was scattered across the track.

== Qualifying ==
The first qualifying session of three to determine the race's starting order through the fastest lap times set by each team's quickest driver began late Wednesday night under clear weather, as Porsche led the time sheets early on with a flying lap from Jani in the No. 14 entry, followed by Hartley's 3:23.157 time a few laps later to top the session. The two Toyota cars stood two seconds back by the end of the session, although the No. 7 car suffered an oil leak and stopped on the side of the circuit, while the two participating Audi R18 e-tron quattro cars were three seconds adrift of the Porsche vehicles. Olivier Pla carried OAK Racing's Morgan to provisional pole in LMP2 with a time of 3:38.843 ahead of the Signatech Alpine and KCMG Oreca. Nicolas Minassian in the No. 37 SMP Racing Oreca-Nissan caused a red flag for half an hour early in the session after crashing in the Porsche Curves. The Pro class of LMGTE was led by Gianmaria Bruni's AF Corse Ferrari, setting a pace of 3:54.754. Aston Martin, Porsche, and Corvette all had cars within two seconds of the Ferrari. Aston Martin's second entry, driven by Fernando Rees, crashed at the Porsche Curves, forcing the session to be ended half an hour earlier than planned in order to repair the barriers. The Aston Martin would later be withdrawn from the race due to the damage to the car. Rees hurt his foot in the accident. At the premature end of the session, Andrea Bertolini's SMP Ferrari was at the top of the timing charts for LMGTE Am with a 3:56.787 lap time, followed by the No. 61 AF Corse Ferrari and Dempsey Porsche.

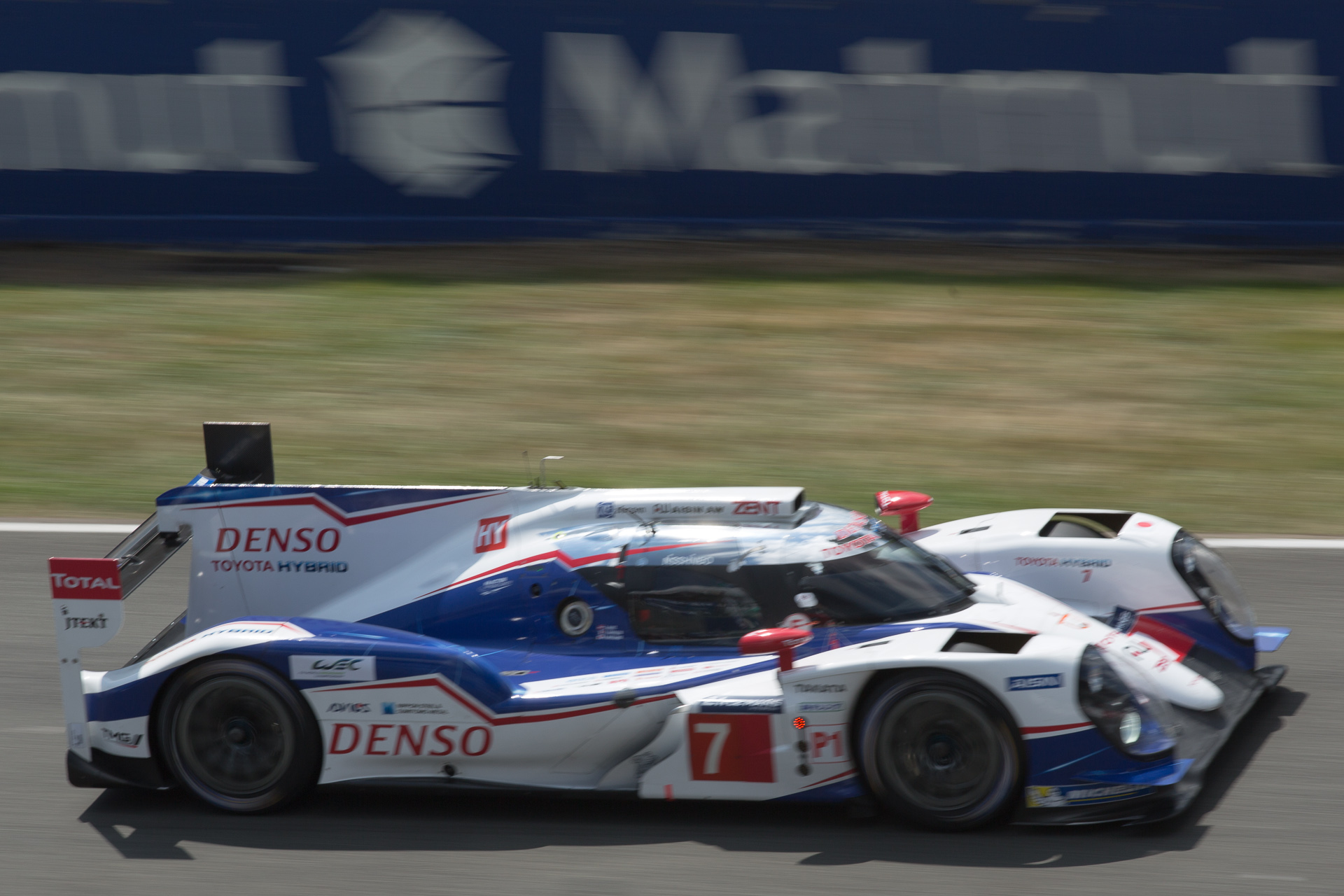
The No. 7 Toyota TS040 Hybrid claimed pole position after setting a 3:21.789 lap in qualifying

Thursday's first qualifying session saw more stoppages for crashes. James Calado crashed his AF Corse Ferrari in the Porsche Curves, necessitating a half-hour red flag. This was followed by the No. 1 Audi, making some of its first laps since its accident on Wednesday, spinning at Indianapolis corner and damaging the car's bodywork. While driver di Grassi attempted to return to the pit lane he swerved in front of Leo Roussel's Pegasus Morgan, causing the LMP2 car to dart off the track and crash at the pit entrance. At the same time, Bret Curtis in the No. 79 Prospeed Porsche spun at the entrance to the Dunlop Chicane and impacted the wall, knocking Curtis unconscious. Curtis was transported to the local hospital for a check-up and was not cleared for the remainder of the race meeting. Following clean-up of the circuit qualifying resumed with 15 minutes left in the session, and improvements were made by nearly every hybrid and non-hybrid car in LMP1. Kazuki Nakajima improved provisional pole position with a 3:22.589 lap, followed by the Porsche entries of Romain Dumas and Bernhard. The fastest Audi was fourth after a lap from Oliver Jarvis. Tristan Gommendy gave the débuting Ligier of TDS Racing provisional pole in LMP2 after displacing the Murphy Oreca on the last lap of the session, setting a time of 3:38.094. In LMGTE Pro, Corvette led the session but did not improve on AF Corse's lap time from the first qualification session. Similarly the No. 61 AF Corse Ferrari came within two-tenths of a second of besting SMP's lead time in LMGTE Am.

With the multiple stoppages in qualifying, the third session was expanded by half an hour in order to give teams more time on the circuit. Fifteen minutes into the session Nakajima set a new fastest time of 3:21.789 and would hold the top of the time charts to take Toyota's first pole position at Le Mans since 1999. Dumas improved the No. 14 Porsche's time to sit alongside the Toyota on the front row of the grid. Audi was not able to improve on their times from the second qualifying session, and settled for fifth, sixth, and seventh places on the grid. The No. 12 Rebellion, driven by Beche, won out over its sister car in the non-hybrid LMP1-L category but eight seconds off the overall pole position. In LMP2, OAK Racing and the Jota Zytek traded provisional pole before Gommendy reclaimed the top spot for TDS Racing and Ligier with a 3:37.609 lap time. Bruni improved on his own provisional pole time in LMGTE Pro with a 3:53.700, extending the class lead by over a second from the No. 73 Corvette in second and sole Aston Martin in third. Sam Bird earned AF Corse a second pole position by improving LMGTE Am's top time by two seconds with a 3:54.665 and setting the second fastest time of all LMGTE cars combined. Aston Martin's two entries were second and third in the class, yet a full second behind the Ferrari. The Nissan ZEOD RC of Lucas Ordóñez, after earlier woes in the week, set a 3:50.185 lap time to place 27th overall in qualifying. The slow zone procedure was used for the first time in the third qualifying session, after Montecalvo spun the 8 Star Ferrari into the gravel in the Porsche Curves. The slow zone was required once more to finish the session after Chandhok crashed the Murphy Oreca at Indianapolis. Both slow zones prevented qualifying times from being improved in the final hour of the session.

=== Post-qualifying ===
Prospeed nominated Sebastien Crubile as a replacement for Curtis, but the ACO did not allow him to participate due to a lack of laps taken under night conditions. The team elected continue as a two-driver operation, but were forced to switch to the LMGTE Pro category due to no longer meeting the LMGTE Am driver ranking requirements. Calado suffered a brain haemorrhage from his second qualifying session crash and was not cleared to participate in the race and was replaced by Pierre Kaffer.

=== Qualifying results ===
Pole position winners in each class are indicated in bold and by a ‡ The fastest time set by each entry is denoted in gray.

Final qualifying classification
Pos.	Class	No.	Team	Qualifying 1	Qualifying 2	Qualifying 3	Gap	Grid
**1**	**LMP1-H**	**7**	**Toyota Racing**	3:25.313	**3:22.589**	**3:21.789**		1‡
2	LMP1-H	14	Porsche Team	3:23.928	3:22.708	3:22.146	+0.357	2
3	LMP1-H	8	Toyota Racing	3:25.410	3:23.661	3:22.523	+0.734	3
4	LMP1-H	20	Porsche Team	**3:23.157**	3:22.908	3:24.136	+1.119	4
5	LMP1-H	3	Audi Sport Team Joest	3:26.445	3:23.271	3:23.364	+1.482	5
6	LMP1-H	2	Audi Sport Team Joest	3:26.388	3:24.276	3:24.729	+2.487	6
7	LMP1-H	1	Audi Sport Team Joest	No Time	3:26.490	3:25.814	+4.025	7
**8**	**LMP1-L**	**12**	**Rebellion Racing**	3:34.922	**3:31.180**	**3:29.763**	+7.974	8‡
9	LMP1-L	13	Rebellion Racing	**3:33.117**	3:31.608	3:33.050	+9.819	9
**10**	**LMP2**	**46**	**Thiriet by TDS Racing**	3:42.730	**3:38.094**	**3:37.609**	**+15.820**	10‡
11	LMP2	38	Jota Sport	3:45.928	3:44.482	3:37.674	+15.885	11
12	LMP2	35	OAK Racing	3:39.822	3:39.523	3:37.892	+16.103	12
13	LMP2	26	G-Drive Racing	**3:38.843**	3:41.446	3:38.000	+16.211	13
14	LMP2	36	Signatech Alpine	3:39.490	3:38.769	3:38.089	+16.300	14
15	LMP2	48	Murphy Prototypes	3:41.502	3:38.207	3:39.091	+16.418	15
16	LMP2	47	KCMG	3:39.586	3:40.476	3:38.689	+16.900	16
17	LMP2	43	Newblood by Morand Racing	3:46.018	3:39.135	3:41.066	+17.346	17
18	LMP2	34	Race Performance	3:39.993	3:44.486	3:40.819	+18.204	18
19	LMP2	42	Caterham Racing	3:41.847	3:47.255	3:40.035	+18.246	19
20	LMP2	24	Sébastien Loeb Racing	3:43.507	3:40.407	3:44.022	+18.618	20
21	LMP2	37	SMP Racing	3:46.940	3:44.395	3:41.297	+19.508	21
22	LMP2	27	SMP Racing	3:43.618	3:42.527	3:42.131	+20.342	22
23	LMP2	29	Pegasus Racing	3:49.046	3:42.438	No time	+20.649	23
24	LMP2	33	OAK Racing-Team Asia	3:42.998	3:48.325	3:43.158	+21.199	24
25	LMP2	50	Larbre Compétition	3:53.948	3:47.015	3:43.843	+22.054	25
26	LMP2	41	Greaves Motorsport	No time	3:44.293	3:44.437	+22.504	26
27	CDNT	0	Nissan Motorsports Global	No time	3:57.096	3:50.185	+28.396	27
**28**	**LMGTE Pro**	**51**	**AF Corse**	**3:54.754**	3:55.552	**3:53.700**	**+31.911**	28‡
**29**	**LMGTE Am**	**81**	**AF Corse**	4:02.452	3:57.665	**3:54.665**	**+32.876**	29‡
30	LMGTE Pro	73	Corvette Racing	3:56.443	**3:55.038**	3:54.777	+32.988	30
31	LMGTE Pro	97	Aston Martin Racing	3:55.067	3:56.516	3:54.891	+33.102	31
32	LMGTE Pro	74	Corvette Racing	3:59.445	3:57.160	3:55.190	+33.401	32
33	LMGTE Pro	52	Ram Racing	3:57.793	3:56.642	3:55.347	+33.558	33
34	LMGTE Pro	92	Porsche Team Manthey	3:55.516	3:57.356	3:55.694	+33.727	34
35	LMGTE Am	98	Aston Martin Racing	4:00.017	3:57.445	3:55.644	+33.855	35
36	LMGTE Pro	91	Porsche Team Manthey	3:56.584	3:57.682	3:55.745	+33.956	36
37	LMGTE Am	95	Aston Martin Racing	4:06.464	3:56.994	3:55.944	+34.155	37
38	LMGTE Am	61	AF Corse	3:56.919	**3:56.917**	3:55.977	+34.188	38
39	LMGTE Am	72	SMP Racing	**3:56.787**	3:58.778	3:56.063	+34.274	39
40	LMGTE Am	88	Proton Competition	3:59.291	3:59.920	3:56.974	+35.185	40
41	LMGTE Am	77	Dempsey Racing-Proton	3:57.004	3:58.373	3:57.230	+35.215	41
42	LMGTE Am	90	8 Star Motorsports	No time	No time	3:57.217	+35.428	42
43	LMGTE Pro	99	Aston Martin Racing	3:57.258	Withdrawn		+35.469	–
44	LMGTE Am	60	AF Corse	4:22.744	4:01.425	3:57.274	+35.485	43
45	LMGTE Am	66	JMW Motorsport	4:05.046	3:58.512	3:57.757	+35.968	44
46	LMGTE Am	53	Ram Racing	3:59.794	4:02.175	3:57.958	+36.169	45
47	LMGTE Pro	71	AF Corse	3:58.330	3:58.086	No time	+36.297	46
48	LMGTE Am	76	IMSA Performance Matmut	No time	4:06.021	3:58.398	+36.609	47
49	LMGTE Pro	79	Prospeed Competition	4:01.226	3:59.012	No time	+37.223	48
50	LMGTE Am	75	Prospeed Competition	3:59.394	3:59.604	4:05.147	+37.605	49
51	LMGTE Am	58	Team Sofrev ASP	3:59.837	4:07.434	4:03.947	+38.048	50
52	LMGTE Am	57	Krohn Racing	4:03.789	4:01.686	4:01.006	+39.217	51
53	LMGTE Am	70	Team Taisan	4:03.066	4:01.446	4:04.512	+39.657	52
54	LMGTE Am	67	IMSA Performance Matmut	No time	4:03.903	4:03.277	+41.488	53
55	LMGTE Am	62	AF Corse	4:11.533	4:20.025	4:10.354	+48.565	54

== Warm-up ==
The cars took to the track on Saturday morning for a 45-minute warm-up session in dry and sunny weather. The No. 8 Toyota driven by Buemi set the fastest time with a late lap of 3:23.731. The sister Toyota of Lapierre was third-fastest having been separated from his teammate by Lotterer who recorded the second-quickest overall time. The other two Audi entrants of Filipe Albuquerque and Marcel Fässler rounded out the top five. The fastest LMP2 lap was set by Pierre Thiriet with a time of 3:40.263. Jan Magnussen, driving the No. 73 Chevrolet Corvette, was the quickest driver in LMGTE Pro with the No. 95 Aston Martin driven by Thiim the fastest of the LMGTE Am drivers. Maurizio Mediani made contact with Shinji Nakano's car but both vehicles sustained only minor damage. Mika Salo crashed his AF Corse Ferrari in a collision with the barriers at the entry to the Porsche Curves, possibly caused by a rear puncture, but the car was not heavily damaged.

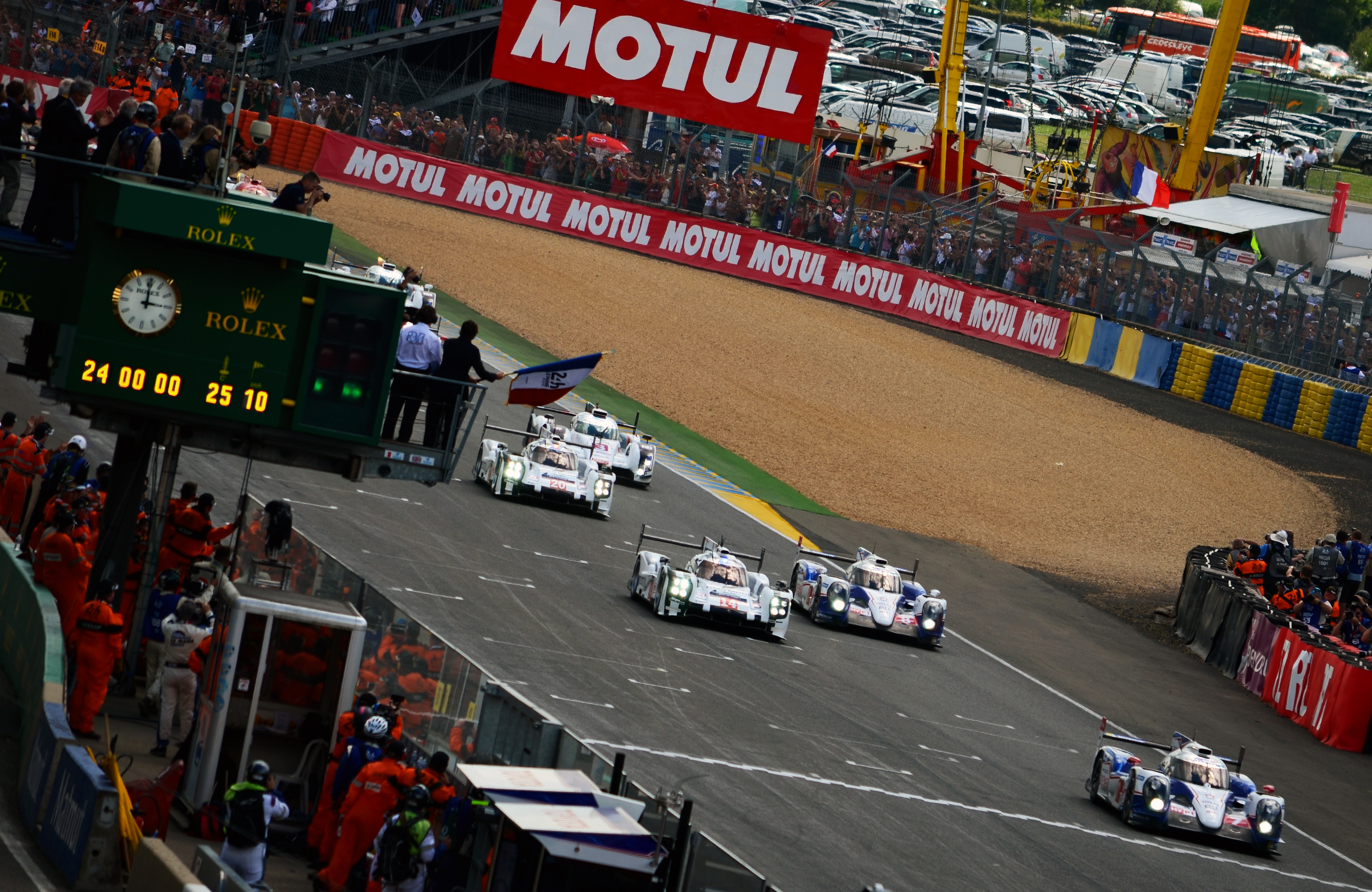
Alexander Wurz leads the field at the start

== Race ==
The weather at the start was dry, hot and sunny. The air temperature throughout the race ranged from 12.5–25 °C (54.5–77.0 °F) with a track temperature between 15.5–47 °C (59.9–116.6 °F). Approximately 243,000 spectators attended the event, the largest crowd since 1989. The race began with a rolling start at 15:00 Central European Summer Time (UTC+02:00), with two-time Formula One World Champion Fernando Alonso having the honour of waving the French Tricolour to start the race. The 54-car field was led by Wurz's Toyota, who maintained the position for most of the opening hours, followed by Lapierre in the second Toyota and the trio of Audi cars driven by Lotterer, Bonanomi and Kristensen; the two Porsche entries of Bernhard and Jani fell back from the leaders. The experimental Nissan ZEOD RC driven by Wolfgang Reip came to a rest on the side of the circuit at the Porsche Curves on the sixth lap after suffering a failure related to its gearbox, and became the first retirement of the race after a request by the team to recover the car was rejected by the ACO. Meanwhile, Lapierre fell from second place after spinning exiting a Mulsanne chicane and bringing out the race's first slow zone procedure.

Rain fell across parts of the circuit in the second hour of the race and several cars were caught out by the change in conditions. The KCMG Oreca-Nissan driven by Richard Bradley, which had been trading the LMP2 lead with Jota Sport, hydroplaned into the first Mulsanne chicane and impacted the tire barriers heavily, while further up the flooded Mulsanne Straight several contenders in multiple classes were involved in a heavy accident. A group of LMGTE cars as well as the No. 3 Audi were slow on the course when they were approached by the No. 8 Toyota of Lapierre at a high speed. Aquaplaning under braking, Lapierre spun amongst the group of cars and impacted the barriers head on. This was followed by Bird in the LMGTE Am-leading AF Corse Ferrari who drove into the rear of Bonanomi. The accident led to a safety car intervention, during which Lapierre was able to limp the Toyota back to the pit lane for repairs that lasted for nearly an hour. Bonanomi and Bird were unable to get their cars moving again and retired. Bradley was able to drive back to the pit lane for repairs and kept second place in LMP2. Loose stones littered some of the corners and track marshals removed them with brooms.

Rain returned to the circuit only 15 minutes after the race resumed green flag conditions and more chaos ensued; Chandhok of Murphy Prototypes and Michael Munemann of Greaves Motorsport collected one another while spinning exiting Tertre Rouge corner, bringing out the safety cars for the second time. As the rain tapered off and racing resumed once more, the remaining Toyota and pursuing Porsche cars were now on different pit stop sequences, allowing Bernhard and later Hartley to briefly take the overall race lead before Sarrazin in the No. 7 reclaimed the top spot by the fourth hour. Further down the field changes in lead were also happening in other categories. Wet weather tyre strategy from the Dempsey-Proton Porsche failed to pay off as the No. 98 Aston Martin took command in LMGTE Am from the slower Porsche. After the damaged KCMG car relinquished the lead in LMP2, Franck Mailleux's No. 34 Race Performance Oreca and Signatech driver Paul-Loup Chatin traded off the category lead before later being joined by the No. 35 OAK Ligier driven by Alex Brundle. The LMGTE Pro lead became a multi-car battle between representatives of each of the four manufacturers, with the lead sometimes changing several times per lap. The Porsche 919 Hybrid also suffered its first major problems as the No. 14 of Marc Lieb went to the garage with fuel pressure problems, dropping the car to 51st place before it recovered to sixth.

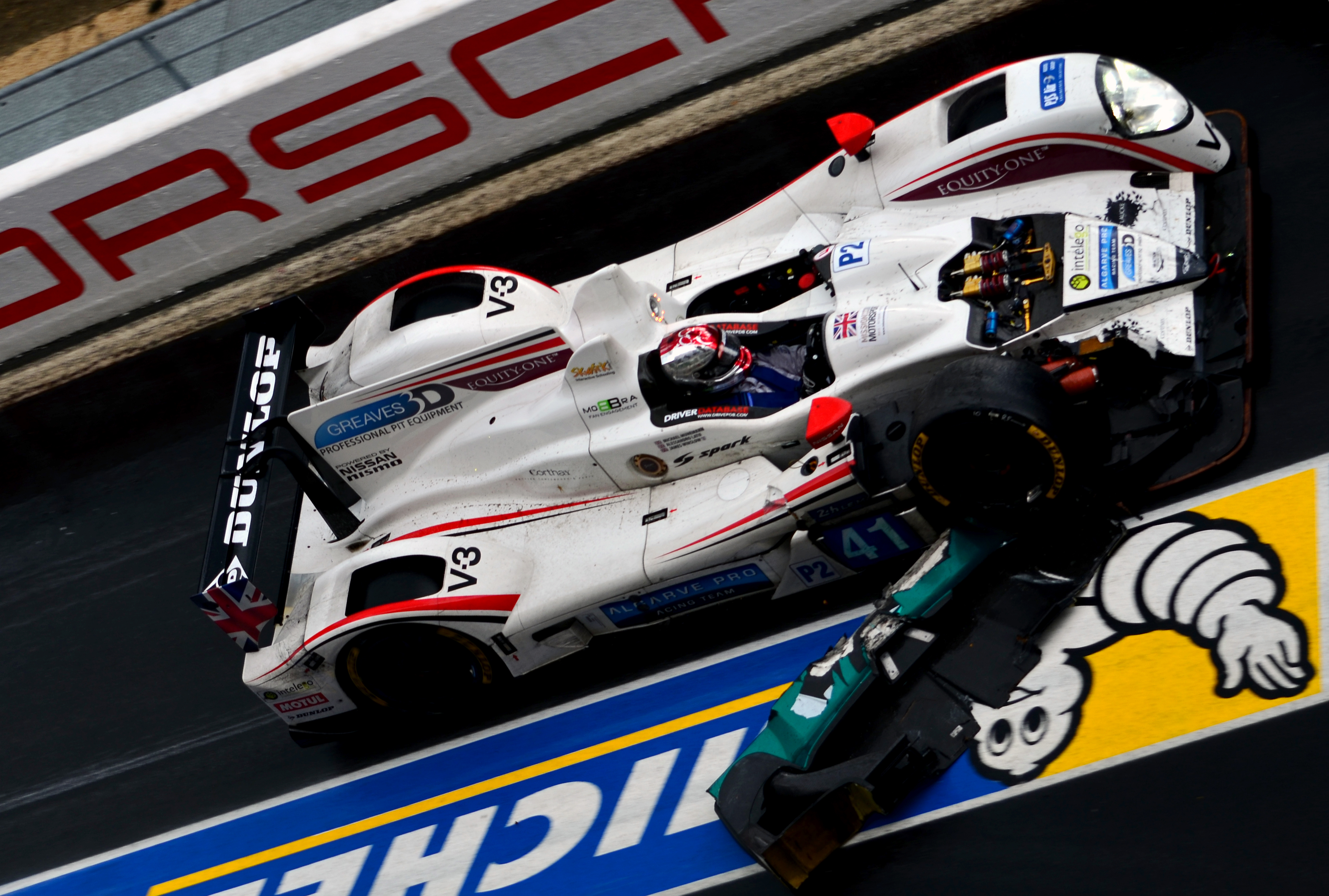
After colliding in the rain, Michael Munemann brings the damaged Greaves Zytek down pit lane dragging a portion of the Murphy Prototypes bodywork beneath him.

As night fell on the circuit, Toyota's lead extended to over a minute from the two remaining Audi entrants, while the OAK Ligier took over the LMP2 lead and ran away to nearly three minutes over the duelling Race Performance Oreca and Signatech Alpine. LMGTE Pro continued to be a close battle between Giancarlo Fisichella in the No. 51 Ferrari, Darren Turner's No. 97 Aston Martin, and No. 74 Corvette driven by Richard Westbrook, with the trio following one another nose to tail for a multitude of laps. The second Corvette dropped off the leading pace after problems with the car's air jack system required a lengthy pit stop. The No. 98 and No. 95 Aston Martin vehicles continued to hold sway over the LMGTE Am class, but around midnight Pedro Lamy relinquished the lead the No. 98 car had held for 86 consecutive laps when he came to the pit lane with smoke from the bonnet as the power steering system on the car failed. The No. 1 Audi of Kristensen was forced to the garage for six minutes to replace failed fuel injectors after the race passed half distance, while Lieb Porsche's No. 14 car was forced to return to the pit lane on solely electrical power after suffering a second fuel pressure problem. Toyota's plan was to start pushing once track temperatures started to rise after dawn. But as Nakajima drove the No. 7 Toyota into its ninth hour in the race lead, the car lost drive shortly after the Arnage corner and came to a stop alongside the barriers. An FIA-mandated piece of monitoring equipment had failed within the car and melted a wiring loom and was not able to be repaired by Nakajima, forcing Toyota to abandon the former race-leading car. The No. 2 Audi became the new leader ahead of the No. 20 Porsche and the recovering No. 1 Audi by three laps.

Over an hour after taking the race lead, Fässler, driving the No. 2 Audi, was forced to replace a failing turbocharger, sitting idle for 23 minutes and falling to third. Audi's No. 1 car took over the top spot after passing the No. 20 Porsche and the ailing No. 2, eventually extending its lead to one lap over the Porsche. Further down the field the No. 74 Corvette was forced to drop out of the lead battle in LMGTE Pro as the alternator belt on the car failed, requiring a visit to the garage that lost the car three laps. The No. 72 SMP Racing Ferrari of Viktor Shaytar had a crash in the Porsche Curves which damaged the safety barriers alongside the track and forced the retirement of the Ferrari. The safety car was deployed for two laps to move necessary equipment to the damaged area for repairs, while a slow zone was used after the safety car period for half an hour while the repairs were undertaken. After green flag racing resumed, the OAK Ligier of Mark Shulzhitskiy leading LMP2 was forced to the garage with engine issues and a broken right-rear brake disc, eventually resuming at a slower pace. The second place TDS Ligier driven by Gommendy was also hindered after a suspension failure caused by a puncture required repairs, and Simon Dolan's Jota Zytek improved to within a lap of the top two in class. The No. 97 Aston Martin driven by Bruno Senna, after continuing its close battle with Bruni in the No. 51 Ferrari, succumbed to the same power steering failure that had hit the No. 98 sister car. Ferrari now enjoyed a two lap lead over Richard Lietz in the No. 92 Porsche who inherited second in class.

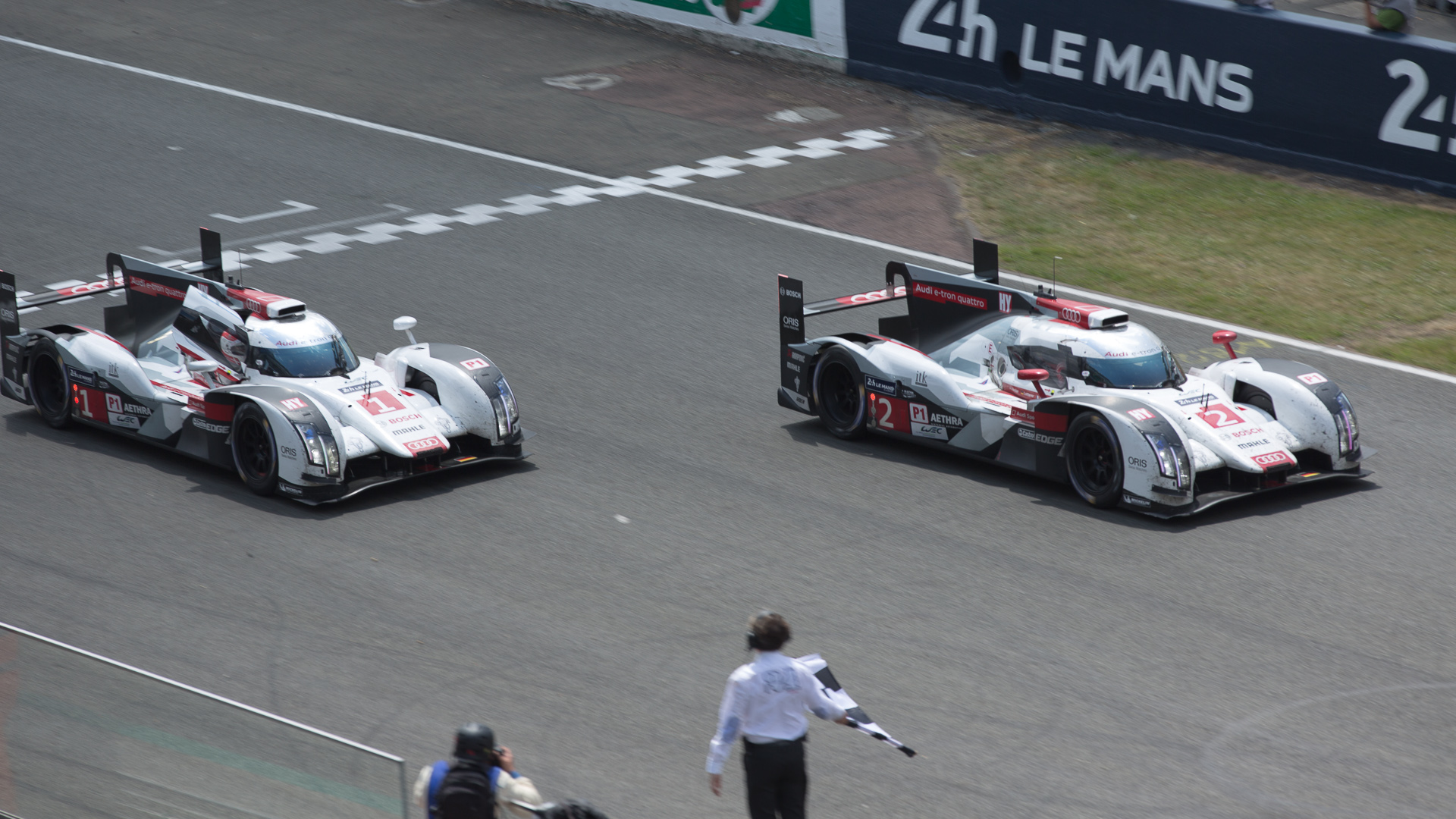
The No. 2 Audi leads the No. 1 Audi in formation over the finish line to win Le Mans

Nearly 21 hours into the race, Kristensen's No. 1 Audi slowed on course on several laps. After eventually returning to the garage Audi were forced to perform their second turbocharger replacement of the race as the No. 1 was hampered by the same issue that had stopped the No. 2's lead. This promoted Bernhard in the No. 20 Porsche to the race lead with the No. 2 Audi driven by Lotterer only a minute and a half behind the leader. Porsche's lead lasted only an hour though as it too slowed on the course suffering from a broken anti-roll bar and was forced to the garage where it was eventually abandoned. The No. 14 Porsche of Lieb came to the garage half an hour later with gearbox issues after slowing at Mulsanne corner but returned to the race in the final half-hour. The shake-up in LMP1 promoted the No. 2 Audi to the race lead, three laps ahead of di Grassi's No. 1 Audi and followed by Davidson's No. 8 Toyota, still recovering from its accident in the opening hours of the race. The attrition amongst LMP1 cars also allowed the No. 12 Rebellion Racing, the sole remaining LMP1-L car in the race, into fourth place overall. The ailing OAK Ligier of Brundle was also forced to abandon the LMP2 lead after being caught by the faster TDS Ligier of Gommendy and Harry Tincknell's Jota Zytek, before eventually having a lengthy stop for more work on the troubled engine which dropped them from contention.

The No. 2 Audi, driven by Fässler, Benoît Tréluyer, and Lotterer, was able to maintain the race lead without trouble for the final two hours of the race, taking the trio's third race win in four years, and Audi's thirteenth overall. Porsche was able to repair the No. 14 car enough to return it to the track for the final lap, settling for eleventh place overall. The battle in LMP2 continued into the last hour, as the Jota Zytek was able to overhaul the TDS Ligier and hold on for the class win and fifth place overall. The win was the first for Jota Sport and its drivers Dolan, Turvey, and Tincknell. Nissan powered the top five finishers in the class. In the LMGTE Pro category, the No. 73 Corvette was able to come back against the No. 92 Porsche to claim second in class, but no one was able to challenge the lead of the AF Corse Ferrari for the remainder of the race. The No. 95 Aston Martin, which had been Allan Simonsen's entry when he was killed in an accident at Le Mans the previous year, was undaunted in LMGTE Am and maintained the first-place position it had held for 205 consecutive laps. Proton Competition came in second in the class, two laps adrift of the Aston Martin. There were eight lead changes in the race; four cars reached the front of the field. The No. 7 Toyota led three times for a total of 207 laps, more than any other car. The No. 2 Audi led twice in the race for a total of 73 laps.

== Post-race ==
The top three finishers of each category appeared on the podium to collect their trophies and in a later press conference. All three of the No. 2 Audi drivers felt their turbocharger problem would have cost them the victory, with Lotterer saying, "When we had the turbo problem we were very disappointed because it's impossible to come back from that. We were a bit unlucky, but at Le Mans you never know what is going to happen and the team motivated me again – they did a great job." Fässler added the team attempted to pressure Toyota but they were unable to catch the Japanese manufacturer: "But this time everyone had problems. We had to be flat out and have no penalties – it isn't easy to do that when you are pushing." Tréluyer stated that winning Le Mans was "emotional" and praised the engineers strategy. He felt their approach was like their 2011 victory: "We concentrated on our own race and took the car through until morning. It was the car which had the least bad luck that won." Kristensen stated he was not unhappy to finish in second and that while his team would have liked to have had their "little fairy tale" it was still a good result. Di Grassi said it had been "a difficult race" for his team but hoped to return to Le Mans in the future while Gené revealed that did not expect a strong result but that second was "like a fairytale for me."

Buemi and Davidson were disappointed to achieve a third-place podium finish with Davidson saying Toyota had to learn from their mistake and make progress. Both drivers added that their focus would be on the championship. Lapierre accepted that his early race crash affected his team's ambitions of winning the race, stating he was unable to see anything because of low visibility, and did not expect to get the car back to the pit lane with the heavy damage it sustained: "We crossed our fingers that the car would hold together to the end, and after this we can be pleased with what we accomplished." Wolfgang Ullrich, the head of Audi Motorsport, expressed his respect for Porsche, saying the German company and Toyota were strong competitors and Ullrich held a belief that Audi would succeed despite strenuous prerequisites for the season. He stated the event was "of the kind you can only experience at Le Mans" with the deciding factors being that the Audi R18 e-tron quattro drove consistently fast for the entire duration of the race and said the victory was placed among the German company's greatest wins because of the constant changing factors for all the competing teams.

The result meant Davidson, Lapierre and Wurz remained at the top of the Drivers' Championship with 80 points while Fässler, Tréluyer and Lotterer's victory enabled them to move into second on 60 points and di Grassi and Kristensen were still in third place but a further six points behind. Beche, Prost and Heidfeld remained in fourth position on 42 points and Gené's second-place finish allowed him to round out the top five with 36 points. Toyota remained the leaders of the Manufacturers' Championship on 115 points, but their advantage over Audi had been reduced to one point while Porsche maintained third position with five races left in the season.

== Official results ==
Class winners are denoted in bold and by the symbol ‡.

Final race classification
Pos.	Class	No.	Team	Drivers	Chassis	Tyre	Laps	Time/Retired
Pos.	Class	No.	Team	Drivers	Engine	Tyre	Laps	Time/Retired
**1**	**LMP1-H**	**2**	**(Germany) Audi Sport Team Joest**	**(Germany) André Lotterer** **(Switzerland) Marcel Fässler** **(France) Benoît Tréluyer**	**Audi R18 e-tron quattro**	M	**379**	**24:01:59.830** ‡
**1**	**LMP1-H**	**2**	**(Germany) Audi Sport Team Joest**	**(Germany) André Lotterer** **(Switzerland) Marcel Fässler** **(France) Benoît Tréluyer**	**Audi TDI 4.0 L Turbo V6 (Diesel)**	M	**379**	**24:01:59.830** ‡
2	LMP1-H	1	(Germany) Audi Sport Team Joest	(Denmark) Tom Kristensen (Spain) Marc Gené (Note: Loïc Duval was driving the No. 1 Audi when he was injured in a Wednesday practice accident. Following Wednesday qualifying, Duval was not cleared to participate in the race and was replaced by Audi reserve driver Marc Gené, who was set to drive for Jota Sport in LMP2.) (Brazil) Lucas di Grassi	Audi R18 e-tron quattro	M	376	+3 Laps
2	LMP1-H	1	(Germany) Audi Sport Team Joest	(Denmark) Tom Kristensen (Spain) Marc Gené (Brazil) Lucas di Grassi	Audi TDI 4.0 L Turbo V6 (Diesel)	M	376	+3 Laps
3	LMP1-H	8	(Japan) Toyota Racing	(United Kingdom) Anthony Davidson (Switzerland) Sébastien Buemi (France) Nicolas Lapierre	Toyota TS040 Hybrid	M	374	+5 Laps
3	LMP1-H	8	(Japan) Toyota Racing	(United Kingdom) Anthony Davidson (Switzerland) Sébastien Buemi (France) Nicolas Lapierre	Toyota 3.7 L V8	M	374	+5 Laps
**4**	**LMP1-L**	**12**	(Switzerland) **Rebellion Racing**	**(France) Nico Prost** **(Germany) Nick Heidfeld** **(Switzerland) Mathias Beche**	**Rebellion R-One**	M	**360**	**+19 Laps** ‡
**4**	**LMP1-L**	**12**	(Switzerland) **Rebellion Racing**	**(France) Nico Prost** **(Germany) Nick Heidfeld** **(Switzerland) Mathias Beche**	**Toyota RV8KLM 3.4 L V8**	M	**360**	**+19 Laps** ‡
**5**	**LMP2**	**38**	**(United Kingdom) Jota Sport**	**(United Kingdom) Simon Dolan** **(United Kingdom) Harry Tincknell** **(United Kingdom) Oliver Turvey** (Note: Marc Gené was originally scheduled to drive the No. 38 Jota Sport Zytek before being called up to replace the injured Duval in the No. 1 Audi. Jota replaced Gené with Oliver Turvey, who drove the car for the first time in Thursday qualifying.)	**Zytek Z11SN**	D	**356**	**+23 Laps** ‡
**5**	**LMP2**	**38**	**(United Kingdom) Jota Sport**	**(United Kingdom) Simon Dolan** **(United Kingdom) Harry Tincknell** **(United Kingdom) Oliver Turvey**	**Nissan VK45DE 4.5 L V8**	D	**356**	**+23 Laps** ‡
6	LMP2	46	(France) Thiriet by TDS Racing	(France) Pierre Thiriet (France) Ludovic Badey (France) Tristan Gommendy	Ligier JS P2	D	355	+24 Laps
6	LMP2	46	(France) Thiriet by TDS Racing	(France) Pierre Thiriet (France) Ludovic Badey (France) Tristan Gommendy	Nissan VK45DE 4.5 L V8	D	355	+24 Laps
7	LMP2	36	(France) Signatech Alpine	(France) Paul-Loup Chatin (France) Nelson Panciatici (United Kingdom) Oliver Webb	Alpine A450b	D	355	+24 Laps
7	LMP2	36	(France) Signatech Alpine	(France) Paul-Loup Chatin (France) Nelson Panciatici (United Kingdom) Oliver Webb	Nissan VK45DE 4.5 L V8	D	355	+24 Laps
8	LMP2	24	(France) Sébastien Loeb Racing	(Germany) René Rast (Czech Republic) Jan Charouz (France) Vincent Capillaire	Oreca 03R	M	354	+25 Laps
8	LMP2	24	(France) Sébastien Loeb Racing	(Germany) René Rast (Czech Republic) Jan Charouz (France) Vincent Capillaire	Nissan VK45DE 4.5 L V8	M	354	+25 Laps
9	LMP2	35	(France) OAK Racing	(United Kingdom) Alex Brundle (United Kingdom) Jann Mardenborough (Russia) Mark Shulzhitskiy	Ligier JS P2	D	354	+25 Laps
9	LMP2	35	(France) OAK Racing	(United Kingdom) Alex Brundle (United Kingdom) Jann Mardenborough (Russia) Mark Shulzhitskiy	Nissan VK45DE 4.5 L V8	D	354	+25 Laps
10	LMP2	43	(Switzerland) Newblood by Morand Racing	(Switzerland) Gary Hirsch (France) Romain Brandela (Austria) Christian Klien	Morgan LMP2	D	352	+27 Laps
10	LMP2	43	(Switzerland) Newblood by Morand Racing	(Switzerland) Gary Hirsch (France) Romain Brandela (Austria) Christian Klien	Judd HK 3.6 L V8	D	352	+27 Laps
11	LMP1-H	14	(Germany) Porsche Team	(Germany) Marc Lieb (France) Romain Dumas (Switzerland) Neel Jani	Porsche 919 Hybrid	M	348	+31 Laps
11	LMP1-H	14	(Germany) Porsche Team	(Germany) Marc Lieb (France) Romain Dumas (Switzerland) Neel Jani	Porsche 9R9 2.0 L Turbo V4	M	348	+31 Laps
12	LMP2	33	(France) OAK Racing-Team Asia	(United States) David Cheng (Netherlands) Ho-Pin Tung (Hong Kong) Adderly Fong	Ligier JS P2	M	347	+32 Laps
12	LMP2	33	(France) OAK Racing-Team Asia	(United States) David Cheng (Netherlands) Ho-Pin Tung (Hong Kong) Adderly Fong	Honda HR28TT 2.8 L Turbo V6	M	347	+32 Laps
13	LMP2	34	(Switzerland) Race Performance	(Switzerland) Michel Frey (France) Franck Mailleux (United Kingdom) Jon Lancaster	Oreca 03R	D	342	+37 Laps
13	LMP2	34	(Switzerland) Race Performance	(Switzerland) Michel Frey (France) Franck Mailleux (United Kingdom) Jon Lancaster	Judd HK 3.6 L V8	D	342	+37 Laps
14	LMP2	50	(France) Larbre Compétition	(France) Pierre Ragues (Japan) Keiko Ihara (United States) Ricky Taylor	Morgan LMP2	M	341	+38 Laps
14	LMP2	50	(France) Larbre Compétition	(France) Pierre Ragues (Japan) Keiko Ihara (United States) Ricky Taylor	Judd HK 3.6 L V8	M	341	+38 Laps
**15**	**LMGTE**; **Pro**	**51**	**(Italy) AF Corse**	**(Italy) Gianmaria Bruni** **(Italy) Giancarlo Fisichella** **(Finland) Toni Vilander**	**Ferrari 458 Italia GT2**	M	**339**	**+40 Laps** ‡
**15**	**LMGTE**; **Pro**	**51**	**(Italy) AF Corse**	**(Italy) Gianmaria Bruni** **(Italy) Giancarlo Fisichella** **(Finland) Toni Vilander**	**Ferrari 4.5 L V8**	M	**339**	**+40 Laps** ‡
16	LMGTE; Pro	73	(United States) Corvette Racing	(Denmark) Jan Magnussen (Spain) Antonio García (United States) Jordan Taylor	Chevrolet Corvette C7.R	M	338	+41 Laps
16	LMGTE; Pro	73	(United States) Corvette Racing	(Denmark) Jan Magnussen (Spain) Antonio García (United States) Jordan Taylor	Chevrolet 5.5 L V8	M	338	+41 Laps
17	LMGTE; Pro	92	(Germany) Porsche Team Manthey	(Germany) Marco Holzer (France) Frédéric Makowiecki (Austria) Richard Lietz	Porsche 911 RSR	M	337	+42 Laps
17	LMGTE; Pro	92	(Germany) Porsche Team Manthey	(Germany) Marco Holzer (France) Frédéric Makowiecki (Austria) Richard Lietz	Porsche 4.0 L Flat-6	M	337	+42 Laps
18	LMP2	29	(Germany) Pegasus Racing	(France) Julien Schell (France) Léo Roussel (Switzerland) Nicolas Leutwiler	Morgan LMP2	D	336	+43 Laps
18	LMP2	29	(Germany) Pegasus Racing	(France) Julien Schell (France) Léo Roussel (Switzerland) Nicolas Leutwiler	Nissan VK45DE 4.5 L V8	D	336	+43 Laps
**19**	**LMGTE**; **Am**	**95**	**(United Kingdom) Aston Martin Racing**	**(Denmark) David Heinemeier Hansson** **(Denmark) Kristian Poulsen** **(Denmark) Nicki Thiim**	**Aston Martin V8 Vantage GTE**	M	**334**	**+45 Laps ‡**
**19**	**LMGTE**; **Am**	**95**	**(United Kingdom) Aston Martin Racing**	**(Denmark) David Heinemeier Hansson** **(Denmark) Kristian Poulsen** **(Denmark) Nicki Thiim**	**Aston Martin 4.5 L V8**	M	**334**	**+45 Laps ‡**
20	LMGTE; Pro	74	(United States) Corvette Racing	(United States) Tommy Milner (United Kingdom) Oliver Gavin (United Kingdom) Richard Westbrook	Chevrolet Corvette C7.R	M	333	+46 Laps
20	LMGTE; Pro	74	(United States) Corvette Racing	(United States) Tommy Milner (United Kingdom) Oliver Gavin (United Kingdom) Richard Westbrook	Chevrolet 5.5 L V8	M	333	+46 Laps
21	LMGTE; Am	88	(Germany) Proton Competition	(Germany) Christian Ried (Austria) Klaus Bachler (United Arab Emirates) Khaled Al Qubaisi	Porsche 911 RSR	M	332	+47 Laps
21	LMGTE; Am	88	(Germany) Proton Competition	(Germany) Christian Ried (Austria) Klaus Bachler (United Arab Emirates) Khaled Al Qubaisi	Porsche 4.0 L Flat-6	M	332	+47 Laps
22	LMGTE; Am	61	(Italy) AF Corse	(Argentina) Luís Pérez Companc (Italy) Marco Cioci (Italy) Mirko Venturi	Ferrari 458 Italia GT2	M	331	+48 Laps
22	LMGTE; Am	61	(Italy) AF Corse	(Argentina) Luís Pérez Companc (Italy) Marco Cioci (Italy) Mirko Venturi	Ferrari 4.5 L V8	M	331	+48 Laps
23	LMGTE; Am	90	(United States) 8 Star Motorsports	(United States) Frankie Montecalvo (Italy) Paolo Ruberti (Italy) Gianluca Roda	Ferrari 458 Italia GT2	M	330	+49 Laps
23	LMGTE; Am	90	(United States) 8 Star Motorsports	(United States) Frankie Montecalvo (Italy) Paolo Ruberti (Italy) Gianluca Roda	Ferrari 4.5 L V8	M	330	+49 Laps
24	LMGTE; Am	77	(United States) Dempsey Racing-Proton	(United States) Patrick Dempsey (United States) Joe Foster (United States) Patrick Long	Porsche 911 RSR	M	329	+50 Laps
24	LMGTE; Am	77	(United States) Dempsey Racing-Proton	(United States) Patrick Dempsey (United States) Joe Foster (United States) Patrick Long	Porsche 4.0 L Flat-6	M	329	+50 Laps
25	LMP2	42	(Malaysia) Caterham Racing	(United Kingdom) Tom Kimber-Smith (United States) Chris Dyson (United States) Matt McMurry	Zytek Z11SN	D	329	+50 Laps
25	LMP2	42	(Malaysia) Caterham Racing	(United Kingdom) Tom Kimber-Smith (United States) Chris Dyson (United States) Matt McMurry	Nissan VK45DE 4.5 L V8	D	329	+50 Laps
26	LMGTE; Am	98	(United Kingdom) Aston Martin Racing	(Canada) Paul Dalla Lana (Portugal) Pedro Lamy (Denmark) Christoffer Nygaard	Aston Martin V8 Vantage GTE	M	329	+50 Laps
26	LMGTE; Am	98	(United Kingdom) Aston Martin Racing	(Canada) Paul Dalla Lana (Portugal) Pedro Lamy (Denmark) Christoffer Nygaard	Aston Martin 4.5 L V8	M	329	+50 Laps
27	LMGTE; Am	66	(United Kingdom) JMW Motorsport	(Saudi Arabia) Abdulaziz Al Faisal (United States) Seth Neiman (United States) Spencer Pumpelly	Ferrari 458 Italia GT2	M	327	+52 Laps
27	LMGTE; Am	66	(United Kingdom) JMW Motorsport	(Saudi Arabia) Abdulaziz Al Faisal (United States) Seth Neiman (United States) Spencer Pumpelly	Ferrari 4.5 L V8	M	327	+52 Laps
28	LMGTE; Am	70	(Japan) Team Taisan	(Japan) Shinji Nakano (United Kingdom) Martin Rich (Germany) Pierre Ehret	Ferrari 458 Italia GT2	M	327	+52 Laps
28	LMGTE; Am	70	(Japan) Team Taisan	(Japan) Shinji Nakano (United Kingdom) Martin Rich (Germany) Pierre Ehret	Ferrari 4.5 L V8	M	327	+52 Laps
29	LMGTE; Am	58	(France) Team Sofrev ASP	(France) Anthony Pons (France) Soheil Ayari (France) Fabien Barthez	Ferrari 458 Italia GT2	M	325	+54 Laps
29	LMGTE; Am	58	(France) Team Sofrev ASP	(France) Anthony Pons (France) Soheil Ayari (France) Fabien Barthez	Ferrari 4.5 L V8	M	325	+54 Laps
30	LMGTE; Am	57	(United States) Krohn Racing	(United States) Tracy Krohn (Sweden) Niclas Jönsson (United Kingdom) Ben Collins	Ferrari 458 Italia GT2	M	324	+55 Laps
30	LMGTE; Am	57	(United States) Krohn Racing	(United States) Tracy Krohn (Sweden) Niclas Jönsson (United Kingdom) Ben Collins	Ferrari 4.5 L V8	M	324	+55 Laps
31	LMGTE; Am	76	(France) IMSA Performance Matmut	(France) Raymond Narac (France) Nicolas Armindo (France) David Hallyday	Porsche 997 GT3-RSR	M	323	+56 Laps
31	LMGTE; Am	76	(France) IMSA Performance Matmut	(France) Raymond Narac (France) Nicolas Armindo (France) David Hallyday	Porsche 4.0 L Flat-6	M	323	+56 Laps
32	LMGTE; Am	53	(United Kingdom) Ram Racing	(United Kingdom) Johnny Mowlem (United Kingdom) Archie Hamilton (United States) Mark Patterson	Ferrari 458 Italia GT2	M	319	+60 Laps
32	LMGTE; Am	53	(United Kingdom) Ram Racing	(United Kingdom) Johnny Mowlem (United Kingdom) Archie Hamilton (United States) Mark Patterson	Ferrari 4.5 L V8	M	319	+60 Laps
33	LMGTE; Pro	79	(Belgium) Prospeed Competition (Note: Bret Curtis was originally scheduled to drive the No. 79 Prospeed Porsche, but sustained a concussion after an accident during qualifying and was not cleared for the race. The team nominated Sebastien Crubilé as a replacement, but the ACO did not allow him to participate due to a lack of laps driven at night. Prospeed opted to continue with only two drivers, but were forced to switch to the LMGTE Pro category due to no longer meeting the LMGTE Am driver ranking requirements.)	(Netherlands) Jeroen Bleekemolen (United States) Cooper MacNeil	Porsche 997 GT3-RSR	M	319	+60 Laps
33	LMGTE; Pro	79	(Belgium) Prospeed Competition	(Netherlands) Jeroen Bleekemolen (United States) Cooper MacNeil	Porsche 4.0 L Flat-6	M	319	+60 Laps
34	LMGTE; Am	67	(France) IMSA Performance Matmut	(France) Erik Maris (France) Jean-Marc Merlin (France) Éric Hélary	Porsche 997 GT3-RSR	M	317	+62 Laps
34	LMGTE; Am	67	(France) IMSA Performance Matmut	(France) Erik Maris (France) Jean-Marc Merlin (France) Éric Hélary	Porsche 4.0 L Flat-6	M	317	+62 Laps
35	LMGTE; Pro	97	(United Kingdom) Aston Martin Racing	(United Kingdom) Darren Turner (Germany) Stefan Mücke (Brazil) Bruno Senna	Aston Martin V8 Vantage GTE	M	310	+69 Laps
35	LMGTE; Pro	97	(United Kingdom) Aston Martin Racing	(United Kingdom) Darren Turner (Germany) Stefan Mücke (Brazil) Bruno Senna	Aston Martin 4.5 L V8	M	310	+69 Laps
36	LMGTE; Pro	91	(Germany) Porsche Team Manthey	(France) Patrick Pilet (United Kingdom) Nick Tandy (Germany) Jörg Bergmeister	Porsche 911 RSR	M	309	+70 Laps
36	LMGTE; Pro	91	(Germany) Porsche Team Manthey	(France) Patrick Pilet (United Kingdom) Nick Tandy (Germany) Jörg Bergmeister	Porsche 4.0 L Flat-6	M	309	+70 Laps
37	LMP2	27	(Russia) SMP Racing	(Russia) Sergey Zlobin (Russia) Anton Ladygin (Finland) Mika Salo	Oreca 03R	M	303	+76 Laps
37	LMP2	27	(Russia) SMP Racing	(Russia) Sergey Zlobin (Russia) Anton Ladygin (Finland) Mika Salo	Nissan VK45DE 4.5 L V8	M	303	+76 Laps
38	LMGTE; Am	62	(Italy) AF Corse	(France) Yannick Mallégol (France) Jean-Marc Bachelier (United States) Howard Blank	Ferrari 458 Italia GT2	M	295	+84 Laps
38	LMGTE; Am	62	(Italy) AF Corse	(France) Yannick Mallégol (France) Jean-Marc Bachelier (United States) Howard Blank	Ferrari 4.5 L V8	M	295	+84 Laps
NC	LMP1-H	20	(Germany) Porsche Team	(Germany) Timo Bernhard (New Zealand) Brendon Hartley (Australia) Mark Webber	Porsche 919 Hybrid	M	346	Incomplete final lap
NC	LMP1-H	20	(Germany) Porsche Team	(Germany) Timo Bernhard (New Zealand) Brendon Hartley (Australia) Mark Webber	Porsche 9R9 2.0 L Turbo V4	M	346	Incomplete final lap
DNF	LMP1-H	7	(Japan) Toyota Racing	(Austria) Alexander Wurz (France) Stéphane Sarrazin (Japan) Kazuki Nakajima	Toyota TS040 Hybrid	M	219	Electrical
DNF	LMP1-H	7	(Japan) Toyota Racing	(Austria) Alexander Wurz (France) Stéphane Sarrazin (Japan) Kazuki Nakajima	Toyota 3.7 L V8	M	219	Electrical
DNF	LMGTE; Am	72	(Russia) SMP Racing	(Italy) Andrea Bertolini (Russia) Viktor Shaytar (Russia) Aleksey Basov	Ferrari 458 Italia GT2	M	196	Crash
DNF	LMGTE; Am	72	(Russia) SMP Racing	(Italy) Andrea Bertolini (Russia) Viktor Shaytar (Russia) Aleksey Basov	Ferrari 4.5 L V8	M	196	Crash
DNF	LMGTE; Am	75	(Belgium) Prospeed Competition	(France) François Perrodo (France) Emmanuel Collard (Finland) Markus Palttala	Porsche 997 GT3-RSR	M	194	Lost wheel
DNF	LMGTE; Am	75	(Belgium) Prospeed Competition	(France) François Perrodo (France) Emmanuel Collard (Finland) Markus Palttala	Porsche 4.0 L Flat-6	M	194	Lost wheel
DNF	LMGTE; Pro	52	(United Kingdom) Ram Racing	(Republic of Ireland) Matt Griffin (Portugal) Álvaro Parente (Italy) Federico Leo	Ferrari 458 Italia GT2	M	140	Mechanical
DNF	LMGTE; Pro	52	(United Kingdom) Ram Racing	(Republic of Ireland) Matt Griffin (Portugal) Álvaro Parente (Italy) Federico Leo	Ferrari 4.5 L V8	M	140	Mechanical
DNF	LMP2	26	(Russia) G-Drive Racing	(Russia) Roman Rusinov (France) Olivier Pla (France) Julien Canal	Morgan LMP2	D	120	Did not finish
DNF	LMP2	26	(Russia) G-Drive Racing	(Russia) Roman Rusinov (France) Olivier Pla (France) Julien Canal	Nissan VK45DE 4.5 L V8	D	120	Did not finish
DNF	LMGTE; Am	60	(Italy) AF Corse	(United States) Peter Mann (Italy) Lorenzo Casè (Italy) Raffaele Giammaria	Ferrari 458 Italia GT2	M	115	Mechanical
DNF	LMGTE; Am	60	(Italy) AF Corse	(United States) Peter Mann (Italy) Lorenzo Casè (Italy) Raffaele Giammaria	Ferrari 4.5 L V8	M	115	Mechanical
DNF	LMP2	47	(Hong Kong) KCMG	(United Kingdom) Matthew Howson (United Kingdom) Richard Bradley (Switzerland) Alexandre Imperatori	Oreca 03R	M	87	Crash
DNF	LMP2	47	(Hong Kong) KCMG	(United Kingdom) Matthew Howson (United Kingdom) Richard Bradley (Switzerland) Alexandre Imperatori	Nissan VK45DE 4.5 L V8	M	87	Crash
DNF	LMP1-L	13	(Switzerland) Rebellion Racing	(Italy) Andrea Belicchi (Switzerland) Fabio Leimer (Austria) Dominik Kraihamer	Rebellion R-One	M	73	Steering
DNF	LMP1-L	13	(Switzerland) Rebellion Racing	(Italy) Andrea Belicchi (Switzerland) Fabio Leimer (Austria) Dominik Kraihamer	Toyota RV8KLM 3.4 L V8	M	73	Steering
DNF	LMP2	48	(Republic of Ireland) Murphy Prototypes	(France) Nathanaël Berthon (India) Karun Chandhok (Venezuela) Rodolfo González	Oreca 03R	D	73	Engine
DNF	LMP2	48	(Republic of Ireland) Murphy Prototypes	(France) Nathanaël Berthon (India) Karun Chandhok (Venezuela) Rodolfo González	Nissan VK45DE 4.5 L V8	D	73	Engine
DNF	LMP2	41	(United Kingdom) Greaves Motorsport	(United Kingdom) Michael Munemann (United Kingdom) Alessandro Latif (United Kingdom) James Winslow	Zytek Z11SN	D	31	Crash
DNF	LMP2	41	(United Kingdom) Greaves Motorsport	(United Kingdom) Michael Munemann (United Kingdom) Alessandro Latif (United Kingdom) James Winslow	Nissan VK45DE 4.5 L V8	D	31	Crash
DNF	LMGTE; Pro	71	(Italy) AF Corse	(Italy) Davide Rigon (Germany) Pierre Kaffer (Note: James Calado was driving the No. 71 AF Corse Ferrari when he was injured in a crash in the second qualifying session. Calado was not cleared to participate in the race and was replaced by Pierre Kaffer.) (Monaco) Olivier Beretta	Ferrari 458 Italia GT2	M	28	Mechanical
DNF	LMGTE; Pro	71	(Italy) AF Corse	(Italy) Davide Rigon (Germany) Pierre Kaffer (Monaco) Olivier Beretta	Ferrari 4.5 L V8	M	28	Mechanical
DNF	LMP1-H	3	(Germany) Audi Sport Team Joest	(Portugal) Filipe Albuquerque (Italy) Marco Bonanomi (United Kingdom) Oliver Jarvis	Audi R18 e-tron quattro	M	25	Crash
DNF	LMP1-H	3	(Germany) Audi Sport Team Joest	(Portugal) Filipe Albuquerque (Italy) Marco Bonanomi (United Kingdom) Oliver Jarvis	Audi TDI 4.0 L Turbo V6 (Diesel)	M	25	Crash
DNF	LMGTE; Am	81	(Italy) AF Corse	(Australia) Stephen Wyatt (Italy) Michele Rugolo (United Kingdom) Sam Bird	Ferrari 458 Italia GT2	M	22	Crash
DNF	LMGTE; Am	81	(Italy) AF Corse	(Australia) Stephen Wyatt (Italy) Michele Rugolo (United Kingdom) Sam Bird	Ferrari 4.5 L V8	M	22	Crash
DNF	LMP2	37	(Russia) SMP Racing	(Russia) Kirill Ladygin (Italy) Maurizio Mediani (France) Nicolas Minassian	Oreca 03R	M	9	Mechanical
DNF	LMP2	37	(Russia) SMP Racing	(Russia) Kirill Ladygin (Italy) Maurizio Mediani (France) Nicolas Minassian	Nissan VK45DE 4.5 L V8	M	9	Mechanical
DNF	CDNT	0	(Japan) Nissan Motorsports Global	(Spain) Lucas Ordóñez (Belgium) Wolfgang Reip (Japan) Satoshi Motoyama	Nissan ZEOD RC	M	5	Gearbox
DNF	CDNT	0	(Japan) Nissan Motorsports Global	(Spain) Lucas Ordóñez (Belgium) Wolfgang Reip (Japan) Satoshi Motoyama	Nissan 1.5 L Turbo I3	M	5	Gearbox
WD	LMGTE; Pro	99	(United Kingdom) Aston Martin Racing	(Hong Kong) Darryl O'Young (United Kingdom) Alex MacDowall (Brazil) Fernando Rees	Aston Martin V8 Vantage GTE	M	–	Withdrawn (Note: The No. 99 Aston Martin was withdrawn from the race following Wednesday qualifying. The car was damaged in a crash and not able to be repaired or replaced for the race.)
WD	LMGTE; Pro	99	(United Kingdom) Aston Martin Racing	(Hong Kong) Darryl O'Young (United Kingdom) Alex MacDowall (Brazil) Fernando Rees	Aston Martin 4.5 L V8	M	–	Withdrawn

Tyre manufacturers
Key
Symbol	Tyre manufacturer
**D**	Dunlop
**M**	Michelin

== Standings after the race ==
World Endurance Drivers' Championship standings
Pos.	+/–	Driver	Points
1		(United Kingdom) Anthony Davidson (France) Nicolas Lapierre (Switzerland) Sébastien Buemi	80
2	6	(Germany) André Lotterer (France) Benoît Tréluyer (Switzerland) Marcel Fässler	60
3		(Brazil) Lucas di Grassi (Denmark) Tom Kristensen	54
4		(Switzerland) Mathias Beche (France) Nicolas Prost (Germany) Nick Heidfeld	42
5	6	(Spain) Marc Gené	36

World Endurance Manufacturers' Championship standings
Pos.	+/–	Constructor	Points
1		(Japan) Toyota	115
2		(Germany) Audi	114
3		(Germany) Porsche	60

- Note: Only the top five positions are included for the Drivers' Championship standings.

== Footnotes ==
FIA World Endurance Championship
Previous race: 6 Hours of Spa-Francorchamps	2014 season	Next race: 6 Hours of Circuit of the Americas
