= SJD Accountancy =

UK-based accountancy firm

- Company type: Private
- Industry: Professional services
- Founded: 1992
- Area served: United Kingdom
- Services: Accounting; Tax; Advisory

SJD Accountancy was a UK-based accountancy firm that provides accountancy services to contractors with private limited companies.

SJD was founded by Simon Dolan in 1992, and became one of the largest accountancy providers in the contractor market.

In 2014, Sovereign Capital acquired both SJD Accountancy and Nixon Williams in a deal worth more than £100m.

Sovereign Capital has now sold its stake in the Group to Alcentra having rebranded Optionis group and it's accountancy firms into Caroola Group in April 2023.

== History ==
Formed in 1992 and merged as part of a £100m deal with private equity firm, Sovereign Capital.

On the same day Nixon Williams, was also purchased by Sovereign Capital, a specialist UK private equity firm.

Since then, Sovereign Capital has now sold its stake in the Group to Alcentra having rebranded Optionis group and it's accountancy firms into Caroola Group in April 2023.
