= Nixon Williams =

Professional accountancy firm based in the UK

- Company type: Private
- Industry: Professional services
- Founded: 1995
- Defunct: 2017
- Fate: Acquired
- Successor: Caroola
- Headquarters: Blackpool, England
- Area served: Nationwide
- Services: Accounting; Tax; Advisory
- Revenue: £5.5 million (2020)
- Number of employees: 53
- Website: nixonwilliams.com

Nixon Williams was a professional accountancy firm based in the United Kingdom, providing accountancy and tax services, and is one of the UK's largest specialists in providing accountancy services to sole traders, partnerships, freelancers, and small private limited companies.

The firm was founded in 1995 by Alan Williams and Andy Nixon, with their surnames forming the name of the organisation. Since 2017, the firm has been a part of the Optionis Group, with its 66 members of staff continuing to work under the Nixon Williams brand.

== History ==
Nixon Williams was founded in 1995 by Alan Williams and Andy Nixon in Chorley. The firm was set up with the view of serving professionals and expanded as the firm started to acquire more clients nationwide via word-of-mouth.

After 19 years at the organisation, both founders stepped down when the business was acquired by Sovereign Capital, a specialist UK private equity firm. Andy Nixon and Alan Williams have since invested in a new practice, Alchemy Accountancy, which was launched in 2018.

In 2017 Nixon Williams became a brand within the Optionis group and was in 2023 rebranded as Caroola.
