= Sam Hignett =

English footballer

Personal information
- Date of birth: 1885
- Place of birth: England
- Date of death: c. 1933 (aged 47–48)
- Position: Right-half

Senior career*
Years	Team	Apps	(Gls)
1906–1908	Liverpool	1	(0)
- * Club domestic league appearances and goals

Sam Hignett (1885 – c. 1933) was an English footballer who played for Liverpool between 1906 and 1908. Playing at right-half, he made one appearance for the reds, against Sunderland on 12 October 1907. He is listed in some sources as being named Alan Hignett.

== See also ==
- Alan Hignett, who also played one game for Liverpool in the 1960s.
