= Ligier JS P2 =

LMP2 race car

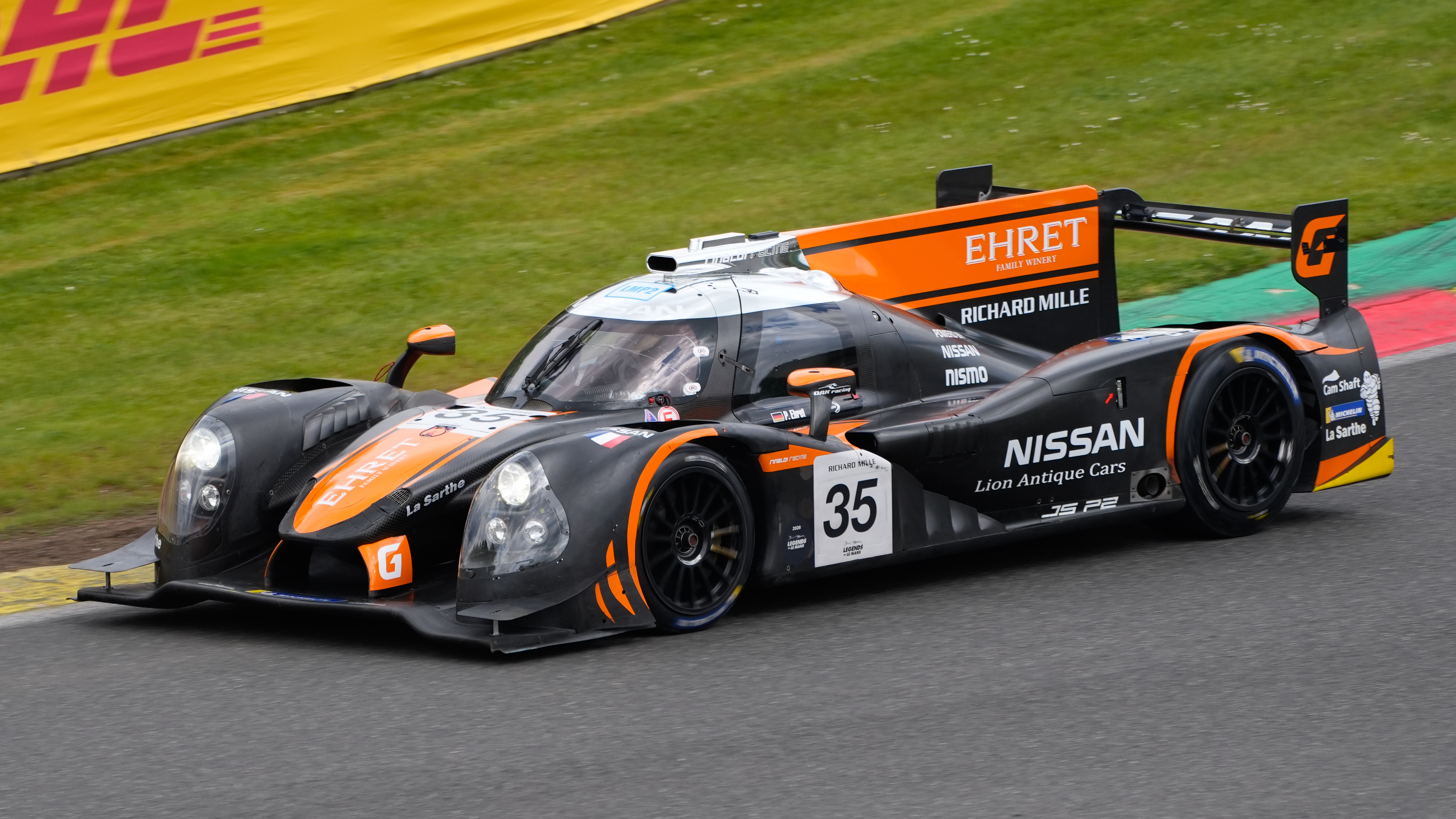
- Pierre Ehret driving the No. 35 JS P2 at the 2026 Legends of Le Mans Series at Spa-Francorchamps
- Category: Le Mans Prototype 2
- Constructor: Onroak Automotive
- Designer: Nicolas Clémençon
- Predecessor: Morgan LMP2
- Successor: Ligier JS P217

Technical specifications
- Chassis: Carbon fibre monocoque
- Suspension (front): Double wishbones with pushrod-activated dampers
- Suspension (rear): Same as front
- Length: 4,610 mm (181 in)
- Width: 2,000 mm (79 in)
- Wheelbase: 2,865 mm (112.8 in)
- Engine: Nissan VK45DE V8, Judd HK V8, Honda HPD HR28TT V6, longitudinal mid-mounted configuration
- Transmission: Xtrac 626 6-speed hydraulically-activated sequential manual transmission
- Power: 500 hp (373 kW)
- Weight: Appr. 900 kg (2,000 lb)
- Fuel: Various
- Lubricants: Various
- Tyres: Michelin, Dunlop, or Continental

Competition history
- Notable entrants: (France) OAK Racing (France) Thiriet by TDS Racing (Russia) G-Drive Racing (United States) Krohn Racing (United States) Michael Shank Racing (United States) Tequila Patrón ESM (United Kingdom) Greaves Motorsport (France) SO24! by Lombard Racing (France) Panis-Barthez Compétition (Portugal) Algarve Pro Racing (Mexico) RGR Sport by Morand (France) IDEC Sport Racing (Belgium) Team WRT (Slovakia) ARC Bratislava (Philippines) Eurasia Motorsport (China) BBT (Switzerland) Spirit of Race (United States) United Autosports (United States) Rick Ware Racing
- Debut: 2014 24 Hours of Le Mans
- First win: 2014 6 Hours of Fuji
- Last win: 2020 4 Hours of Buriram
- Last event: 2020 4 Hours of Buriram
Races	Wins	Podiums	Poles	F/Laps
78	24	81	33	8
- Teams' Championships: 5 (2015 FIA WEC, 2016-17 Asian LMS, 2018-19 Asian LMS, 2018-19 Asian LMS (P2 Am), 2019-20 Asian LMS (P2 Am)))
- Drivers' Championships: 5 (2015 FIA WEC, 2016-17 Asian LMS, 2018-19 Asian LMS, 2018-19 Asian LMS (P2 Am), 2019-20 Asian LMS (P2 Am))

The Ligier JS P2 is a racing car designed and built by French manufacturer Onroak Automotive and named in partnership with French former racing driver Guy Ligier. Designed for the Le Mans Prototype 2 (LMP2) regulations, it is intended as a second option to Onroak's Morgan LMP2 that has been competing since 2012. As well as being the first closed-cockpit car offered by Onroak, it is also the first car they designed entirely in-house. The JS P2 debuted at the 2014 24 Hours of Le Mans, and has been campaigned in the FIA World Endurance Championship, European Le Mans Series, Asian Le Mans Series and IMSA WeatherTech SportsCar Championship.

== Development ==
Onroak initially planned to develop a car for the Le Mans Prototype 1 category but cancelled these plans to concentrate on the LMP2 category. The design was seen by Onroak as marketable in North America where closed-cockpit designs, which were required for all LMP1 cars, were also prominent choices for LMP2s and Daytona Prototypes in the new United SportsCar Championship. The LMP1 design was therefore evolved into an LMP2 design with measures taken to assure the car met the Automobile Club de l'Ouest's (ACO) cost limitations in LMP2. The car was designed to be able to utilize available LMP2 engines:
A flat-plane crankshaft version of a Nissan V8 aluminum DOHC 4-valve engine (VK45). Judd's naturally aspirated HK V8 (BMW S65 Variant), and Honda's HPD V6 double turbo engine; (HR28TT). A high downforce sprint design and a low downforce Le Mans setup are offered for the car.

Naming of the JS P2 came about through an alliance between Onroak and Guy Ligier's partnership of Équipe Ligier and Automobiles Martini. The JS P2 follows Ligier's naming scheme of his cars being named after French racing driver Jo Schlesser (JS). The partnership included Onroak taking over development of Ligier-Martini's Group CN car.

== Racing history ==
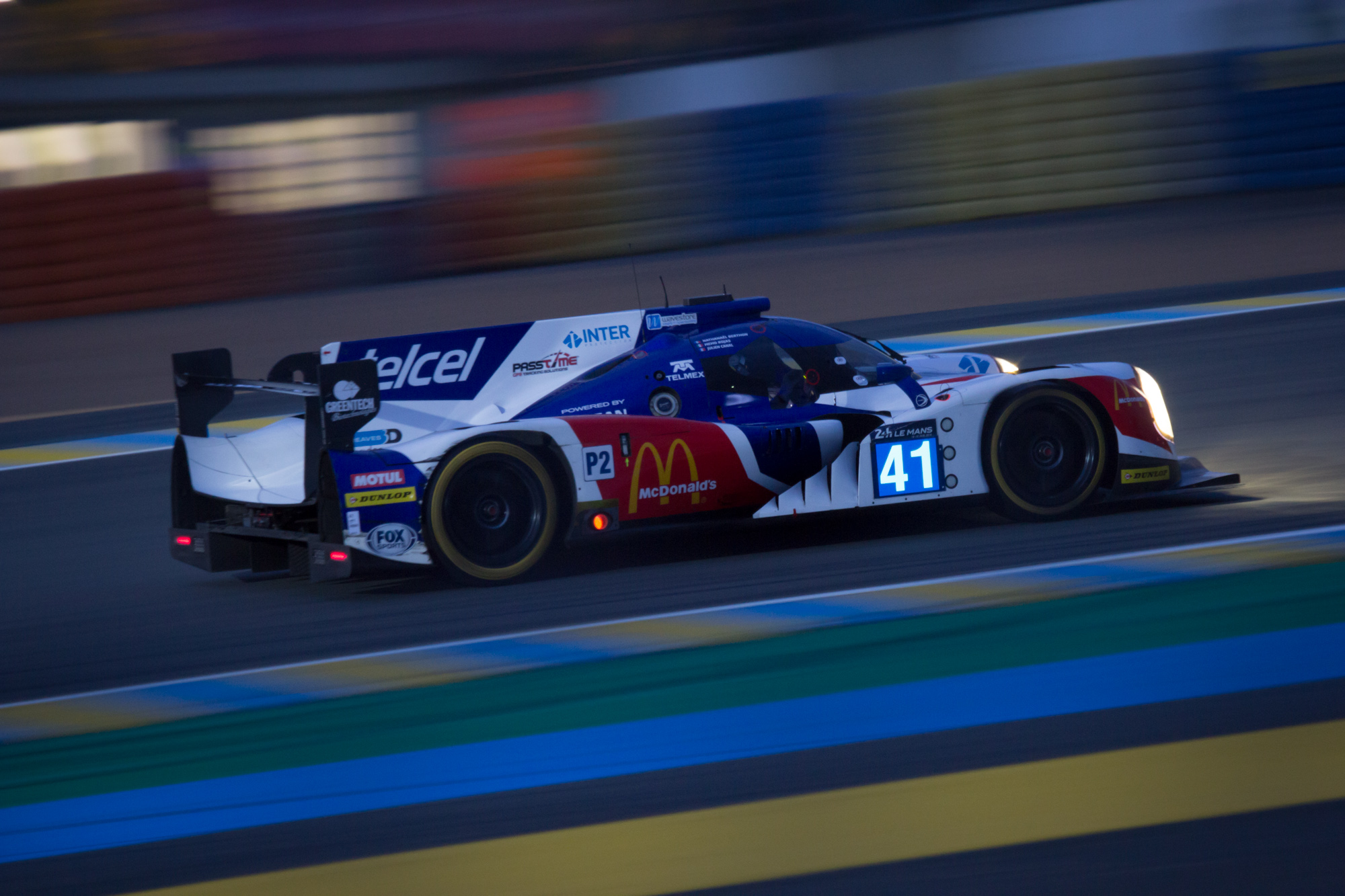
The Ligier JS P2 (VK45DE) of Greaves Motorsport at the 2016 24 Hours of Le Mans: Finished Position 10 @ 348 Laps

The JS P2 began initial testing in March 2014. The debut of the first JS P2s was set for the 24 Hours of Le Mans in June, where the Ligier name would race for the first time since a Ligier JS2 had finished second overall in 1975. OAK would enter two cars, one backed by Nissan's drivers and engine while the other car featured three Chinese drivers and a Honda powerplant. The third car was purchased by privateers Thiriet by TDS Racing and also used a Nissan engine. The two Nissan JS P2 qualified well, with TDS's car on pole position and the first OAK car in third. All three cars finished the 24 hour endurance with TDS in second and OAK in fifth and seventh places in class.

Following Le Mans TDS Racing campaigned their Ligier in the remainder of the European Le Mans Series, but were unable to finish the three races in which they participated. OAK Racing meanwhile brought their Ligier to the United States for the two remaining rounds of the United SportsCar Championship, where Alex Brundle put the Honda-powered JS P2 on pole position on debut at Circuit of the Americas en route to a second-place finish. The Nissan-powered OAK car moved to the FIA World Endurance Championship where it earned five consecutive pole positions in the five remaining races as well as class victories at Fuji Speedway and Shanghai International Circuit.

In 2015 the American Krohn Racing team purchased a JS P2 for a partial season in the United SportsCar Championship and a full season in the European Le Mans Series, and will be the first team to utilize Judd power in the Ligier. Michael Shank Racing purchased a Honda-powered JS P2 for a full United SportsCar Championship campaign, and won pole position at the Rolex 24 at Daytona. In 2016, Extreme Speed Motorsports entered a JS P2 in the United Sportscar Championship, winning both the 2016 24 Hours of Daytona and the 2016 12 Hours of Sebring, with the JS P2 becoming the first car to defeat a Daytona Prototype at the 24 hours, as well as the team becoming the first to win the so-called "36 Hours of Florida" since 1998.

== Results summary ==
=== Complete World Endurance Championship results ===
(key) Races in bold indicates pole position. Races in italics indicates fastest lap. Green background indicates second team entry; eligible only for Drivers' championship points.

Complete FIA World Endurance Championship results
Year	Entrant	Class	Drivers	No.	Rds.	Rounds									Pts.	Pos.
Year	Entrant	Class	Drivers	No.	Rds.	1	2	3	4	5	6	7	8	9	Pts.	Pos.
2014	(Russia) G-Drive Racing	LMP2	(Russia) Roman Rusinov (France) Olivier Pla (France) Julien Canal	26	4-8; 4-8; 4-8	SIL	SPA	LMS	**COA**; **4**	**FUJ**; **1**	**SHA**; **1**	**BHR**; **4**	**SÃO**; **Ret**		137*	2nd*
2014	(France) OAK Racing-Team Asia	LMP2	(United States) David Cheng (Netherlands) Ho-Pin Tung (Hong Kong) Adderly Fong	33	3; 3; 3	SIL	SPA	LMS; 7	COA	FUJ	SHA	BHR	SÃO		0	NC
2014	(France) OAK Racing	LMP2	(United Kingdom) Alex Brundle (United Kingdom) Jann Mardenborough (Russia) Mark Shulzhitskiy	35	3; 3; 3	SIL	SPA	LMS; 5	COA	FUJ	SHA	BHR	SÃO		0	NC
2014	(France) Thiriet by TDS Racing	LMP2	(France) Pierre Thiriet (France) Ludovic Badey (France) Tristan Gommendy	46	3; 3; 3	SIL	SPA	**LMS**; **2**	COA	FUJ	SHA	BHR	SÃO		0	NC
2015	(Russia) G-Drive Racing	LMP2	(Russia) Roman Rusinov (France) Julien Canal (United Kingdom) Sam Bird	26	All; All; All	SIL 1	**SPA**; **10**	LMS; 3	NÜR; 2	**COA**; **1**	**FUJ**; **1**	**SHA**; **2**	BHR; 1		178	1st
2015	(Russia) G-Drive Racing	LMP2	(Colombia) Gustavo Yacamán (Mexico) Ricardo González (Brazil) Pipo Derani	28	All; All; All	**SIL**; 2	SPA; 2	LMS; 4	NÜR; 3	COA; 3	FUJ; 3	SHA; Ret	BHR; 3		134	3rd
2015	(United States) Extreme Speed Motorsports	LMP2	(United States) Scott Sharp (United Kingdom) Ryan Dalziel (Denmark) David Heinemeier Hansson	30	2-8; 2-8; 2-8	SIL	SPA; 9	LMS; 10	NÜR; 6	COA; 4	FUJ; 4	SHA; Ret	BHR; 7		62	7th
2015	(United States) Extreme Speed Motorsports	LMP2	(United States) Ed Brown (United States) Jon Fogarty (United States) Johannes van Overbeek	31	2-8; 2-8; 2-8	SIL	SPA; 8	LMS; 7	NÜR; 8	COA; Ret	FUJ; 7	SHA; 5	BHR; 8		62*	8th*
2015	(France) OAK Racing	LMP2	(Canada) Chris Cumming (France) Kévin Estre (Belgium) Laurens Vanthoor	34	3; 3; 3	SIL	SPA	LMS; Ret	NÜR	COA	FUJ	SHA	BHR		0	NC
2015	(France) OAK Racing	LMP2	(France) Jacques Nicolet (France) Jean-Marc Merlin (France) Erik Maris	35	1-3; 1-3; 1-3	SIL; 5	SPA; 7	LMS; 11	NÜR	COA	FUJ	SHA	BHR		34	9th
2015	(United States) Krohn Racing	LMP2	(United States) Tracy Krohn (Sweden) Niclas Jönsson (Portugal) João Barbosa	40	3; 3; 3	SIL	SPA	LMS; 12	NÜR	COA	FUJ	SHA	BHR		0	NC
2016	(France) SO24! by Lombard Racing	LMP2	(France) Vincent Capillaire (France) Erik Maris (United Kingdom) Jonathan Coleman	22	3; 3; 3	SIL	SPA	LMS; 14	NÜR	MEX	COA	FUJ	SHA	BHR	0	NC
2016	(France) Panis-Barthez Compétition	LMP2	(France) Fabien Barthez (France) Timothé Buret (France) Paul-Loup Chatin	23	3; 3; 3	SIL	SPA	LMS; 8	NÜR	MEX	COA	FUJ	SHA	BHR	0	NC
2016	(Portugal) Algarve Pro Racing	LMP2	(United Kingdom) Michael Munemann (United Kingdom) Chris Hoy (France) Andrea Pizzitola	25	3; 3; 3	SIL	SPA	LMS; 12	NÜR	MEX	COA	FUJ	SHA	BHR	0	NC
2016	(United States) Extreme Speed Motorsports	LMP2	(United States) Scott Sharp (United States) Ed Brown (United States) Johannes van Overbeek (Indonesia) Sean Gelael (Italy) Antonio Giovinazzi (Netherlands) Giedo van der Garde (United Kingdom) Tom Blomqvist (France) Tom Dillmann	30	1-6; 1-6; 1-6; 7-9; 7-9; 7, 9; 8; 9	SIL; 9	SPA; 7	LMS; 11	NÜR; 8	MEX; 9	COA; 7	FUJ; 4	SHA; 2	BHR; 5	78	5th
2016	(United States) Extreme Speed Motorsports	LMP2	(Brazil) Pipo Derani (United Kingdom) Ryan Dalziel (Canada) Chris Cumming	31	All; All; All	SIL; 2	SPA; 2	LMS; 15	NÜR; 3	MEX; 3	COA; 5	FUJ; 5	SHA; 5	BHR; 4	116	4th
2016	(United States) Krohn Racing	LMP2	(United States) Tracy Krohn (Sweden) Niclas Jönsson (Portugal) João Barbosa	40	3; 3; 3	SIL	SPA	LMS; 13	NÜR	MEX	COA	FUJ	SHA	BHR	0	NC
2016	(United Kingdom) Greaves Motorsport	LMP2	(Mexico) Memo Rojas (France) Julien Canal (France) Nathanaël Berthon	41	3; 3; 3	SIL	SPA	LMS; 6	NÜR	MEX	COA	FUJ	SHA	BHR	0	NC
2016	(Mexico) RGR Sport by Morand	LMP2	(Portugal) Filipe Albuquerque (Brazil) Bruno Senna (Mexico) Ricardo González	43	All; All; All	SIL; 1	SPA; 4	LMS; 10	NÜR; 2	**MEX**; **1**	COA; 2	FUJ; 2	SHA; 3	BHR; 2	169	2nd
2016	(United States) Michael Shank Racing	LMP2	(United States) John Pew (Brazil) Oswaldo Negri Jr. (Belgium) Laurens Vanthoor	49	3; 3; 3	SIL	SPA	LMS; 9	NÜR	MEX	COA	FUJ	SHA	BHR	0	NC

^{*} Points were scored with the Morgan LMP2

^{*} Points were scored with the HPD ARX-03b

=== Complete European Le Mans Series results ===
(key) Races in bold indicates pole position. Races in italics indicates fastest lap.

Complete European Le Mans Series results
Year	Entrant	Class	Drivers	No.	Rds.	Rounds						Pts.	Pos.
Year	Entrant	Class	Drivers	No.	Rds.	1	2	3	4	5	6	Pts.	Pos.
2014	(France) Thiriet by TDS Racing	LMP2	(France) Ludovic Badey (France) Tristan Gommendy (France) Pierre Thiriet	46	All; All; All	SIL	IMO	RBR; Ret	LEC; Ret	EST; Ret		35*	7th*
2015	(Portugal) Algarve Pro Racing	LMP2	(United Kingdom) Michael Munemann (Italy) Andrea Roda (United Kingdom) James Winslow	25	3-5; 3-5; 3-5	SIL	IMO	RBR; 10	LEC; 8	EST; 7		11	12th
2015	(United States) Krohn Racing	LMP2	(Sweden) Niclas Jönsson (United States) Tracy Krohn (Brazil) Oswaldo Negri Jr. (France) Julien Canal (France) Olivier Pla	40	All; All; 1-2; 3; 4-5	SIL; 4	IMO; 5	RBR; 5	LEC; 5	EST; 8		46	4th
2016	(France) SO24! By Lombard Racing	LMP2	(France) Vincent Capillaire (United Kingdom) Jonathan Coleman (France) Olivier Lombard	22	1-2; 1-2; 1-2	SIL; 3	IMO; 11	RBR	LEC	SPA	EST	15.5	12th
2016	(France) Panis Barthez Competition	LMP2	(France) Fabien Barthez (France) Timothé Buret (France) Paul-Loup Chatin	23	All; All; All	SIL; 9	IMO; 7	**RBR**; **7**	LEC; 11	SPA; 7	EST; 7	27.5	8th
2016	(Portugal) Algarve Pro Racing	LMP2	(United Kingdom) Michael Munemann (India) Parth Ghorpade (United Kingdom) Chris Hoy (Switzerland) Jonathan Hirschi (France) Andrea Pizzitola (Italy) Andrea Roda	25	1-3, 5; 1-2; 1-2; 3-5; 3-5; 4	SIL; 10	IMO; Ret	RBR; 5	LEC; 7	SPA; 9	EST	19	9th
2016	(France) IDEC Sport Racing	LMP2	(France) Dimitri Enjalbert (France) Patrice Lafargue (France) Paul Lafargue	28	1-2, 4–6; 1-2, 4–6; 1-2, 4–6	SIL; 7	IMO; Ret	RBR	LEC; 10	SPA; 8	EST; 6	19	10th
2016	(United States) Krohn Racing	LMP2	(Sweden) Niclas Jönsson (Sweden) Björn Wirdheim (United States) Tracy Krohn (France) Olivier Pla	40	All; 1-2; 1, 3–5; 2-6	SIL; 4	IMO; 6	RBR; 9	LEC; 8	SPA; 10	EST; 4	39	6th
2016	(United Kingdom) Greaves Motorsport	LMP2	(France) Julien Canal (Mexico) Memo Rojas (Poland) Kuba Giermaziak (France) Nathanaël Berthon	41	All; All; 1-2; 3-6	SIL; 8	IMO; 8	RBR; 6	LEC; 6	SPA; 4	EST; Ret	36	7th
2016	(Belgium) Team WRT	LMP2	(United Kingdom) Will Stevens (Belgium) Dries Vanthoor (Belgium) Laurens Vanthoor	47	5; 5; 5	SIL	IMO	RBR	LEC	SPA; 2	EST	18	11th

^{*} Points were scored with the Morgan LMP2

=== Complete IMSA SportsCar Championship results ===
(key) Races in bold indicates pole position. Races in italics indicates fastest lap.

Complete IMSA SportsCar Championship results
Year	Entrant	Class	Drivers	No.	Rds.	Rounds											Pts.	Pos.
Year	Entrant	Class	Drivers	No.	Rds.	1	2	3	4	5	6	7	8	9	10	11	Pts.	Pos.
2014	(France) OAK Racing	P	(Colombia) Gustavo Yacamán (United Kingdom) Alex Brundle (China) Ho-Pin Tung	42	All; 10-11; 11	DAY	SEB	LBH	LGA	DET	WGL	MOS	IMS	ELK	**COA**; **2**	PET; 9	309	5th
2015	(United States) Krohn Racing	P	(United States) Tracy Krohn (Sweden) Niclas Jönsson (France) Olivier Pla (United Kingdom) Alex Brundle	57	1-2; 1-2; 1-2; 1	DAY; 13	**SEB**; **6**	LBH	LGA	DET	WGL	MOS	ELK	COA	PET		45	11th
2015	(United States) Michael Shank Racing with Curb/Agajanian	P	(Brazil) Oswaldo Negri Jr. (United States) John Pew (United States) Matt McMurry (United States) A. J. Allmendinger (United Kingdom) Justin Wilson	60	All; All; 1, 10; 1; 2	**DAY**; **5**	SEB; 13	LBH; 6	LGA; 3	DET; 2	WGL; 7	MOS; 3	ELK; 4	COA; 4	PET; 9		273	6th
2016	(United States) Tequila Patrón ESM	P	(Brazil) Pipo Derani (United States) Scott Sharp (United States) Johannes van Overbeek (United States) Ed Brown	2	1-2, 6, 10; 1-2, 6, 10; 1-2, 6, 10; 1-2	DAY; 1	SEB; 1	LBH	LGA	DET	**WGL**; **9**	MOS	ELK	COA	PET; 2		128	9th
2016	(United States) Michael Shank Racing with Curb-Agajanian	P	(Brazil) Oswaldo Negri Jr. (United States) John Pew (France) Olivier Pla (United States) A. J. Allmendinger (United Kingdom) Katherine Legge	60	All; 1-4, 6–10; 1-2, 6, 10; 1; 5	DAY; 11	**SEB**; **7**	LBH; 7	LGA; 1	DET; 5	WGL; 3	MOS; 6	ELK; 4	COA; 6	**PET**; **1**		282	4th

^{*} Points were scored with the Morgan LMP2

=== Complete Asian Le Mans Series results ===
(key) Races in bold indicates pole position. Races in italics indicates fastest lap.

Year	Entrant	Class	Drivers	No.	Rds.	Rounds				Pts.	Pos.
Year	Entrant	Class	Drivers	No.	Rds.	1	2	3	4	Pts.	Pos.
2015-16	(Portugal) Algarve Pro Racing	LMP2	(Australia) Dean Koutsoumidis (United Kingdom) Michael Munemann (United Kingdom) James Winslow	25	2-4; 2-4; 2-4	FUJ	**SEP I** **2**	BUR; 2	**SEP II**; **3**	53	2nd
2016-17	(Portugal) Algarve Pro Racing	LMP2	(South Korea) Tacksung Kim (United States) Matt McMurry (Italy) Andrea Roda (United States) Mark Patterson (Switzerland) Jonathan Hirschi (United Kingdom) Michael Munemann	24	All; 1; 1; 2-4; 2; 3-4	ZHU; 2	FUJ; 4	BUR; 3	SEP; 3	60	3rd
2016-17	(Portugal) Algarve Pro Racing	LMP2	(France) Andrea Pizzitola (United Kingdom) Michael Munemann (Netherlands) Nicky Catsburg (Italy) Andrea Roda (United States) Matt McMurry (Australia) Aidan Read	25	All; 1-2; 1; 2-4; 3; 4	**ZHU**; **3**	**FUJ**; **3**	BUR; 2	**SEP**; **1**	76	1st
2017-18	(Slovakia) ARC Bratislava	LMP2	(Latvia) Konstantīns Calko (Slovakia) Miroslav Konôpka (Netherlands) Rik Breukers (Colombia) Gustavo Yacamán	4	All; All; 1-2; 3	ZHU; 3	FUJ; 4	BUR; 4	SEP; 4	51	3rd
2017-18	(Portugal) Algarve Pro Racing	LMP2	(Netherlands) Ate de Jong (Australia) Dean Koutsoumidis (Canada) John Graham	25	All; All; 1, 3–4	ZHU; 4	FUJ; 4	BUR; Ret	SEP; Ret	20	6th
2017-18	(Philippines) Eurasia Motorsport	LMP2	(Hong Kong) Alex Au (Japan) Keiko Ihara (Australia) Scott Andrews (Estonia) Marko Asmer (Japan) Yoshiharu Mori (Malaysia) Nabil Jeffri (Australia) Jake Parsons	33	1; 1; 2; 2,4; 2; 4; 4	ZHU; 4	FUJ; Ret	BUR	**SEP**; **3**	28	5th
2017-18	(China) BBT	LMP2	(Brazil) Pipo Derani (China) Anthony Liu (Italy) Davide Rizzo	37	All; All; All	ZHU; 2	**FUJ**; **2**	BUR; 3	SEP; 2	70	2nd
2018-19	(Switzerland) Spirit of Race	LMP2	(Brazil) Pipo Derani (France) Côme Ledogar (Sweden) Alexander West	8	1-2, 4; 1-2, 4; 1-2, 4	**SHA**; **1**	FUJ; 6	CHA	**SEP**; **5**		
2018-19	(United States) United Autosports	LMP2	(United Kingdom) Phil Hanson (United Kingdom) Paul di Resta	22	All; All	SHA; 2	FUJ; 2	CHA; 1	SEP; 2	80	1st
2018-19	(Portugal) Algarve Pro Racing	LMP2	(Philippines) Ate de Jong (United Kingdom) Harrison Newey (France) Andrea Pizzitola	24	All; All; All	SHA; Ret	FUJ; 1	CHA; 2	SEP; 1	69	2nd
2018-19	(France) Panis Barthez Competition	LMP2	(France) François Hériau (France) Matthieu Lahaye (France) Jean-Baptiste Lahaye	35	All; All; 1, 3–4	SHA; 6	FUJ; 4	CHA; 3	SEP; 3	50	4th
2018-19	(Slovakia) ARC Bratislava	LMP2 Am	(United Kingdom) Darren Burke (Slovakia) Miroslav Konôpka (China) Kang Ling	4	All; All; All	SHA; 2	FUJ; 1	**CHA**; **1**	SEP; 1	94	1st
2018-19	(United States) United Autosports	LMP2 Am	(United States) Patrick Byrne (United States) Guy Cosmo (Turkey) Salih Yoluç	23	All; All; All	SHA; 1	**FUJ**; **2**	CHA; 3	SEP; Ret	60	2nd
2018-19	(Portugal) Algarve Pro Racing	LMP2 Am	(Denmark) Anders Fjordbach (United States) Chris McMurry (United States) Mark Patterson	25	All; All; All	SHA; 3	FUJ; 3	CHA; 2	**SEP**; **Ret**	49	3rd
2019-20	(Slovakia) ARC Bratislava	LMP2 Am	(Slovakia) Miro Konôpka (Greece) Andreas Laskaratos (China) Kang Ling (Australia) Garnet Patterson	4	1-2; 1-2; 1; 2	**SHA**; **Ret**	BEN; 3	SEP	CHA	16	4th
2019-20	(United States) Rick Ware Racing	LMP2 Am	(United States) Philippe Mulacek (United States) Guy Cosmo (United States) Anthony Lazzaro	25	2-4; 2-4; 2-4	SHA; DNS	BEN; 2	**SEP**; **Ret**	**CHA**; **1**	45	2nd
2019-20	(United States) Rick Ware Racing	LMP2 Am	(United States) Mark Kvamme (United States) Cody Ware (Lithuania) Gustas Grinbergas	52	1 All; 2-4	SHA; 2	BEN; 1	SEP; 1	CHA; 2	86	1st

== Gallery ==
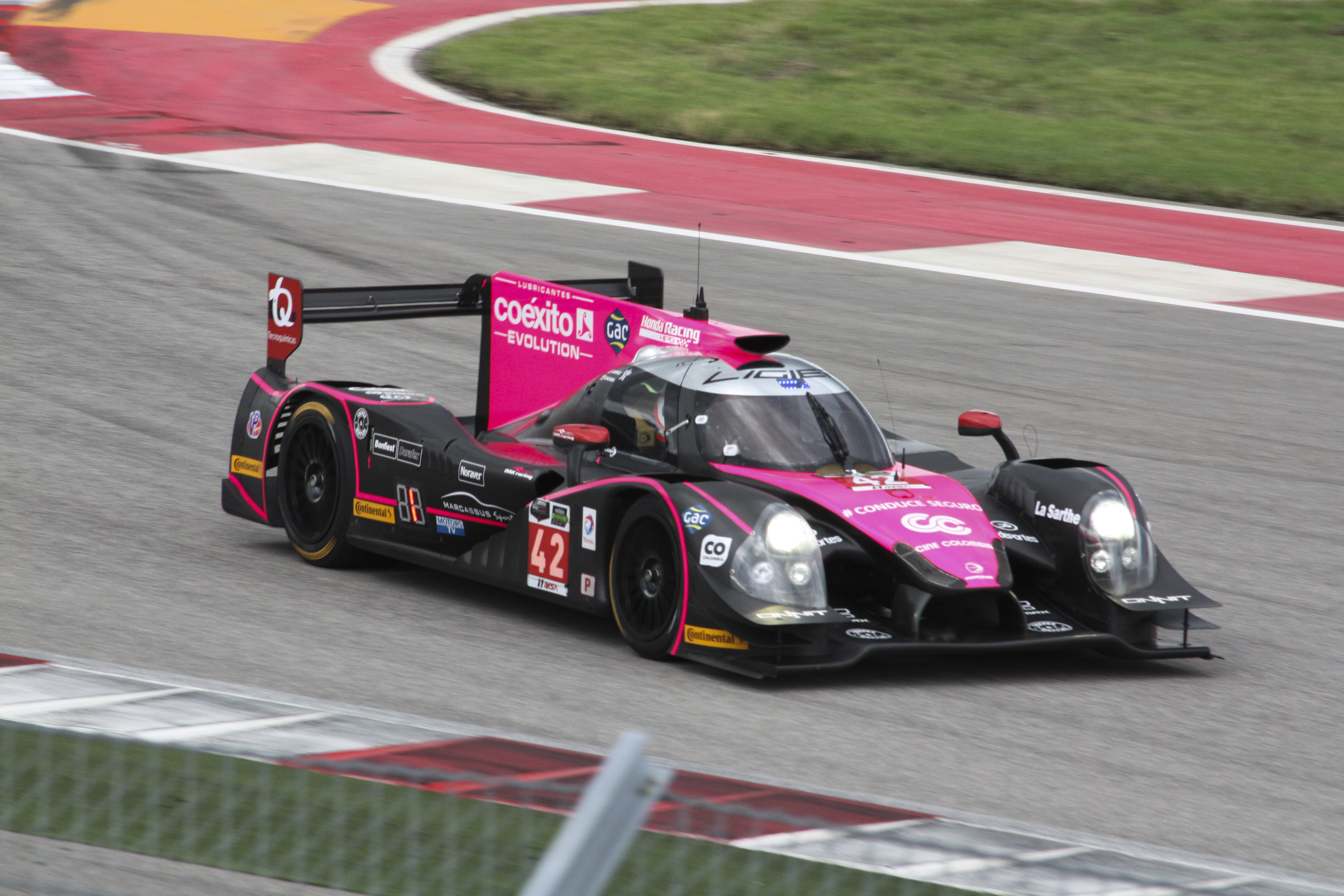
The No. 42 car of OAK Racing at the 2014 Lone Star Le Mans

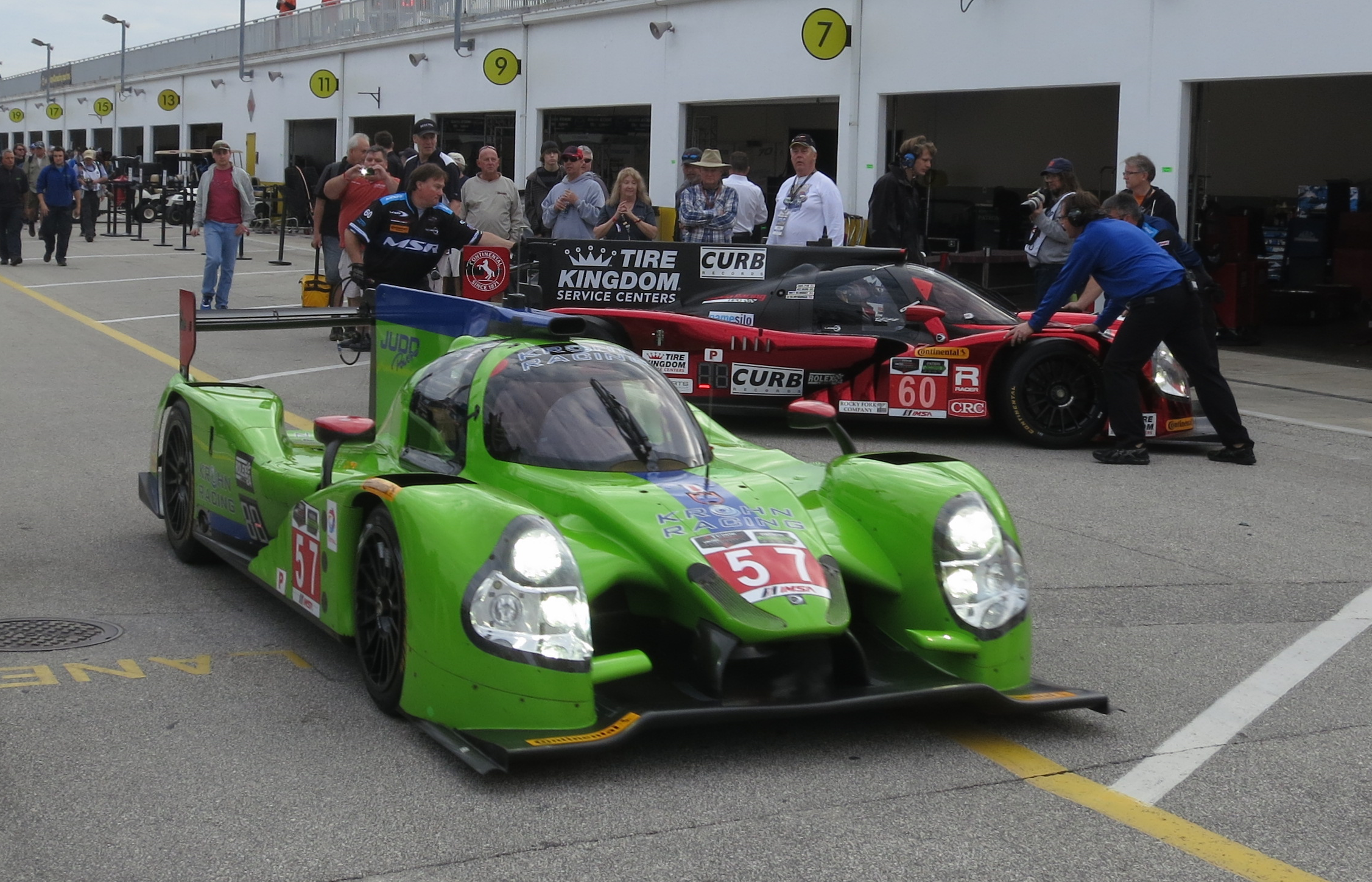
The No. 57 and No. 60 cars of Krohn Racing and Michael Shank Racing, respectively, at the 2015 24 Hours of Daytona

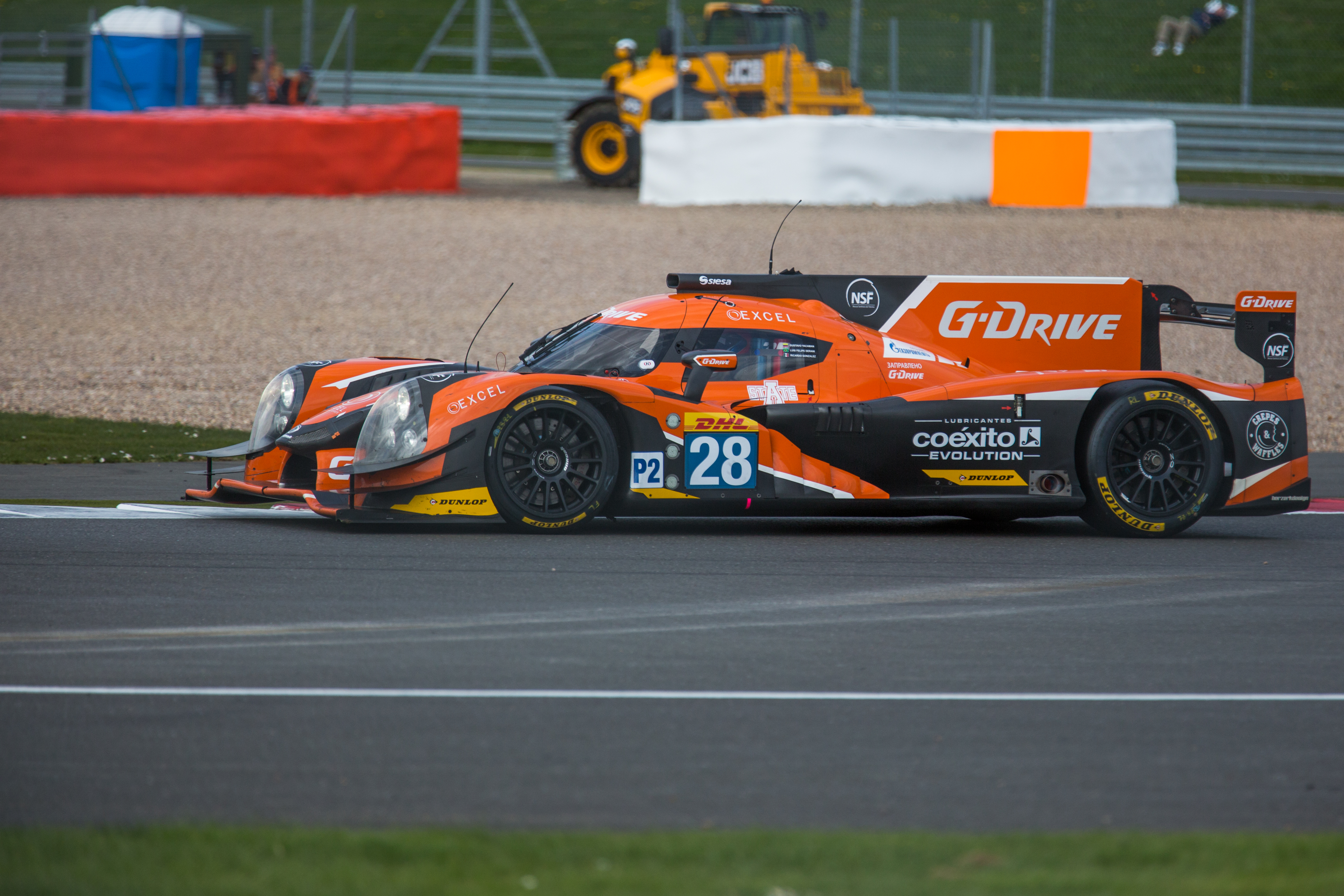
The No. 28 car of G-Drive Racing at the 2015 4 Hours of Silverstone

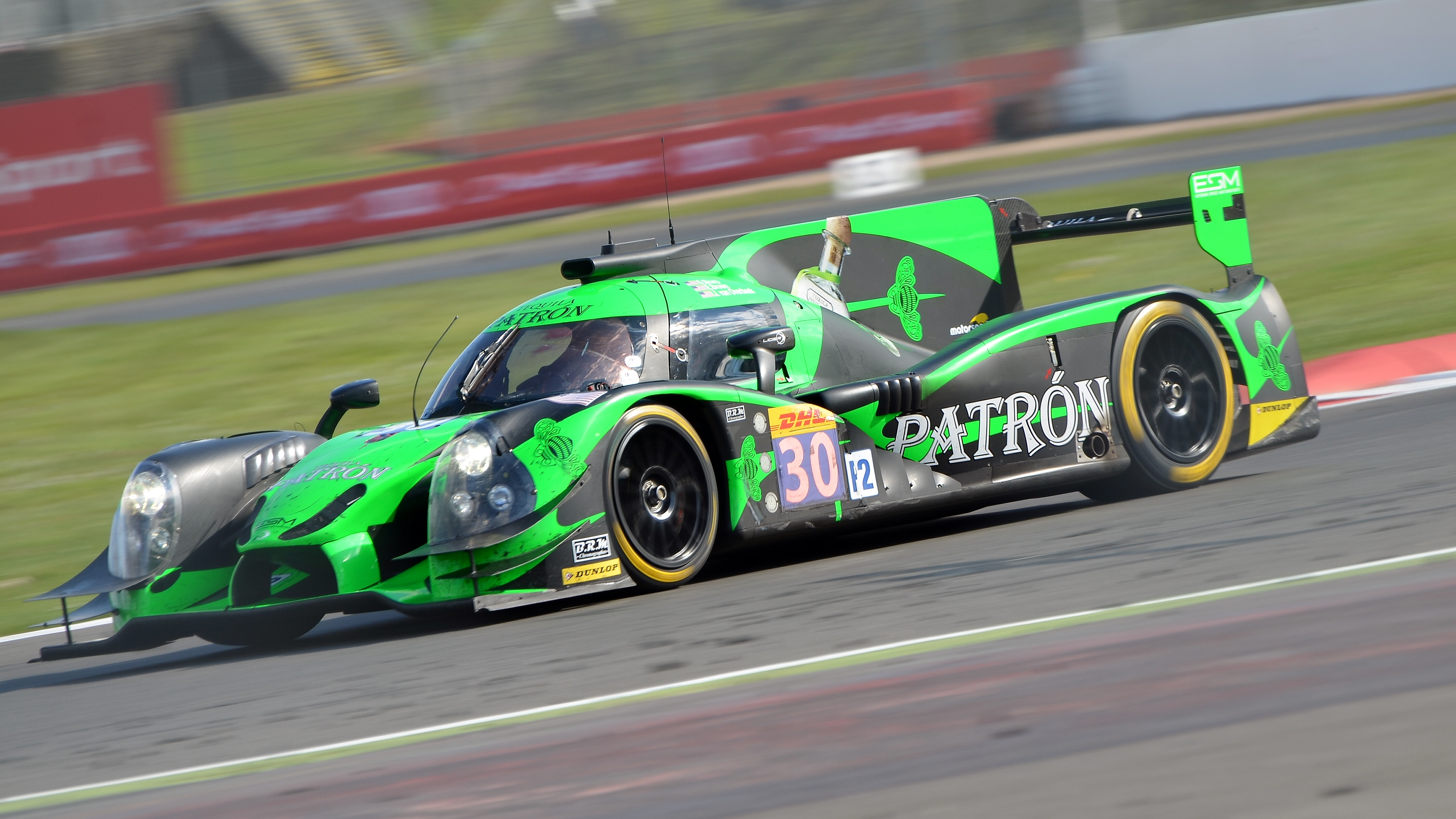
The No. 30 car of Extreme Speed Motorsports at the 2016 6 Hours of Silverstone

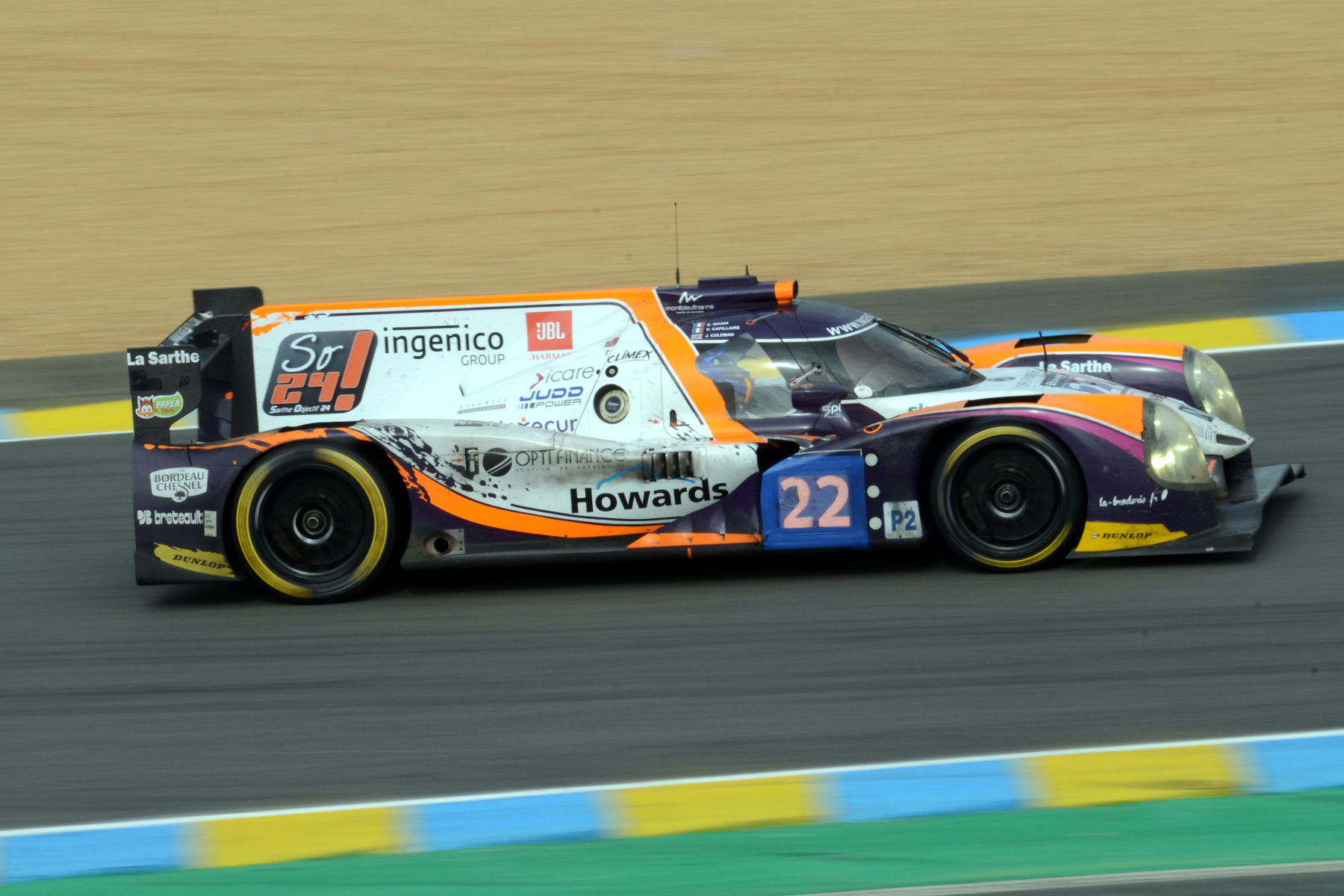
The No. 22 car of Lombard Racing at the 2016 24 Hours of Le Mans

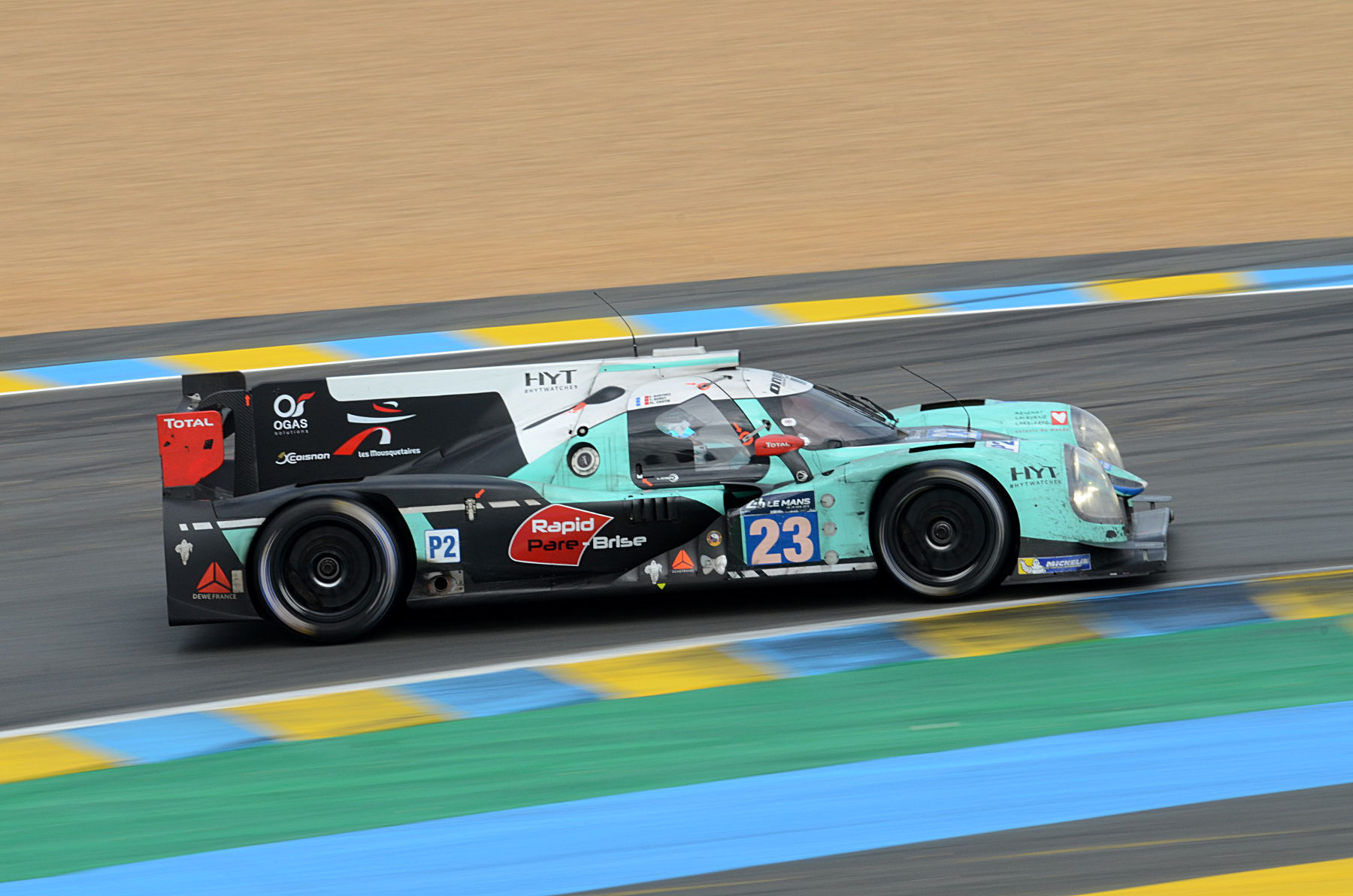
The No. 23 car of Panis Barthez Competition at the 2016 24 Hours of Le Mans

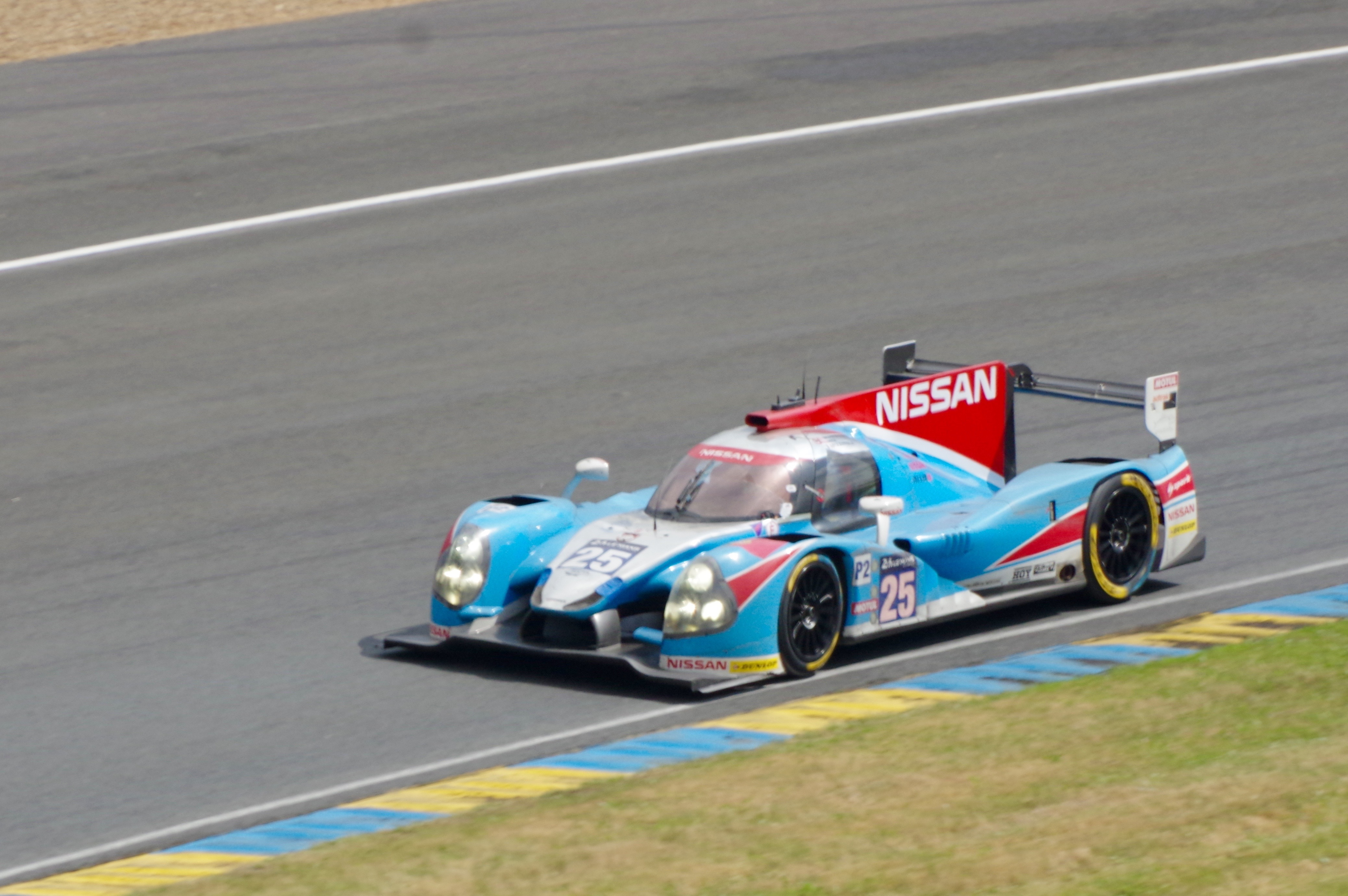
The No. 25 car of Algarve Pro Racing at the 2016 24 Hours of Le Mans

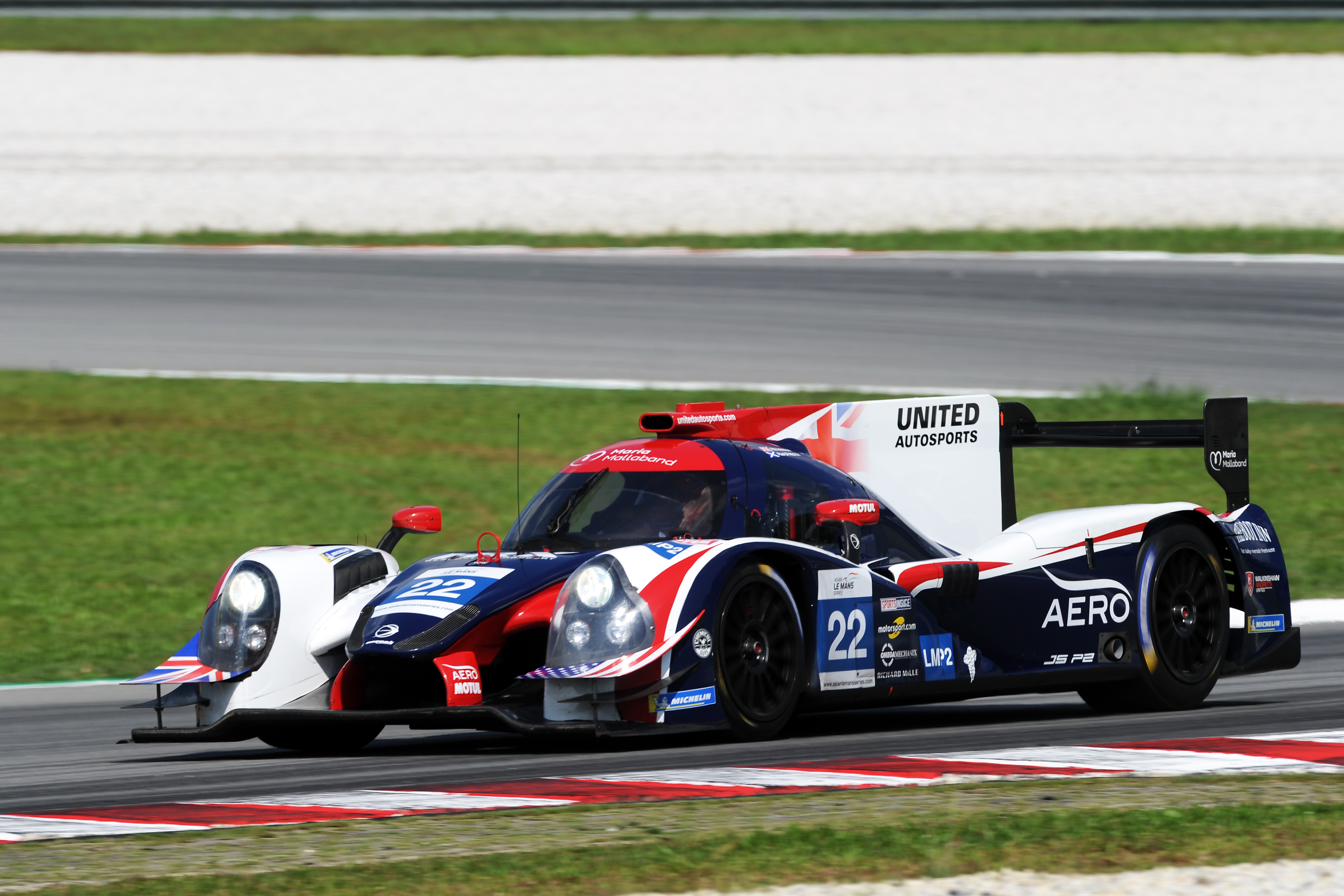
The No. 22 car of United Autosports at the 2019 4 Hours of Sepang
