= Duqueine Team =

French racing team & manufacturer

(France) Duqueine Team
- Founded: 2014
- Founder(s): Gilles Duqueine; Yann Belhomme
- Base: Fontenay-le-Comte, France
- Team principal(s): Gilles Duqueine (director); Thibaut de Mérindol (team principal)
- Current series: European Le Mans Series; Asian Le Mans Series; 24 Hours of Le Mans
- Former series: FIA World Endurance Championship; FFSA GT Championship; Renault Sport Trophy; Le Mans Cup; V de V Endurance Series; 24H Series; Blancpain Endurance Series
- Current drivers: European Le Mans Series: 30. (France) Doriane Pin (Netherlands) Richard Verschoor (Italy) Giorgio Roda
- Website: https://www.duqueine.com/

Duqueine Team, formerly known as Duqueine Engineering, is a French sports car racing team founded in 2014. The team currently competes in the European Le Mans Series in LMP2. They previously operated Isotta Fraschini's Hypercar entry in the FIA World Endurance Championship. It is also active as a constructor under the Duqueine Automotive banner, notably creating the Duqueine D08 and Duqueine D09 LMP3 prototypes after buying out Norma Auto Concept in 2017.

The squad's origin dates back to 1976, when brothers Gilles and Vincent Duqueine began building single-seater race cars. Their company, Duqueine Group, currently manufactures composite parts for the aeronautics industry.

== 2026: Partnership with R-ace GP ==
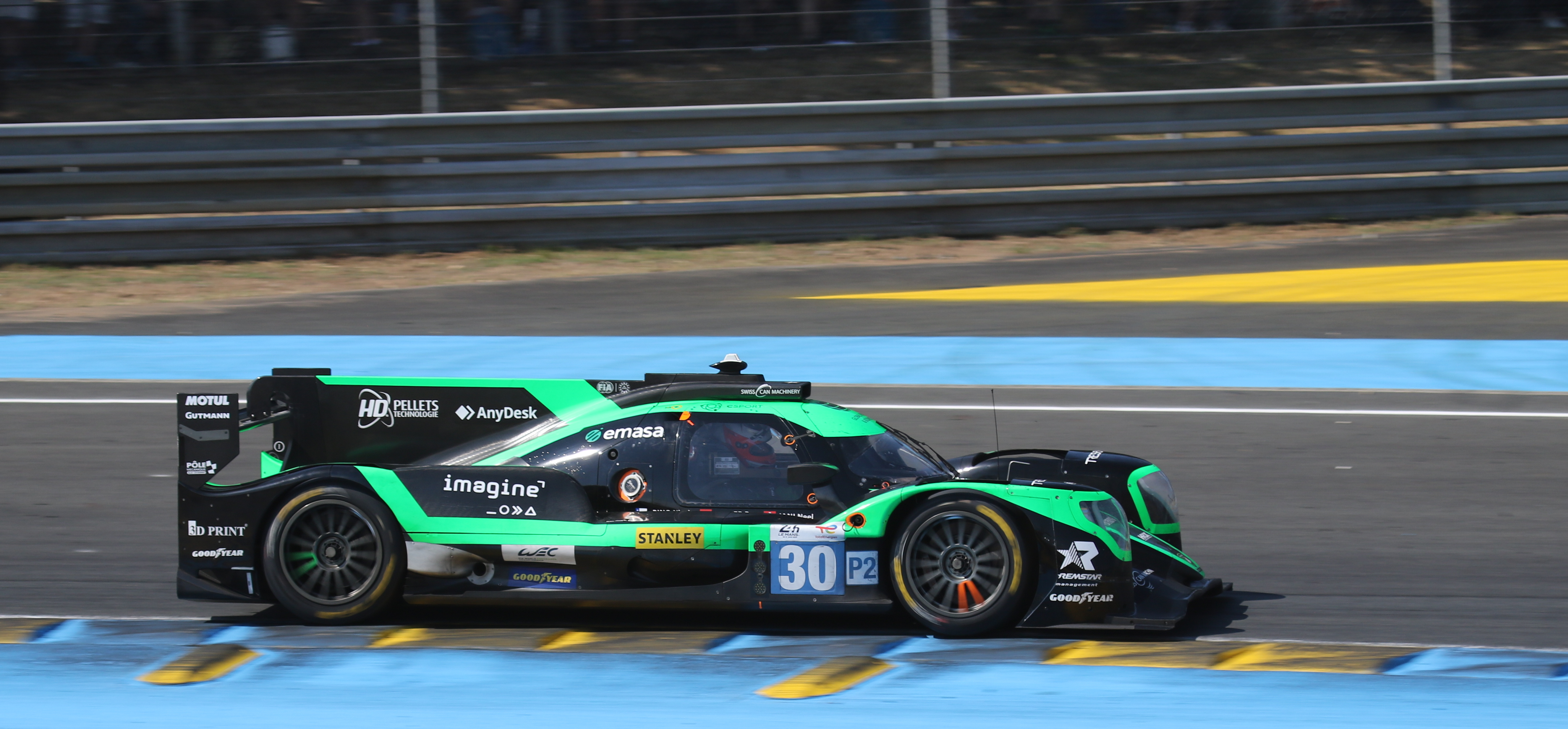
Duqueine at the 2023 24 Hours of Le Mans

In early 2026, Gilles Duqueine announced a strategic partnership with R-ace GP, which took over operational management of the squad's LMP2 programme. As part of the move, Duqueine Team relocated from its Alès base to R-ace GP's facilities in Fontenay-le-Comte, Vendée.

The team unveiled its line-up for the LMP2 Pro/Am category of the 2026 European Le Mans Series (ELMS) season: Italian bronze Giorgio Roda, Dutch Formula 2 driver Richard Verschoor, and French driver Doriane Pin, the 2025 F1 Academy champion and a Mercedes Formula 1 development driver. The crew finished 3rd in the opening round of the championship. That result was matched in the following round with another 3rd-place finish, putting Duqueine Team at the top of the LMP2 Pro/Am standings. In June 2026, the team took part in the 24 Hours of Le Mans for the 7th time in its history. Pin and Verschoor were joined by Porsche factory driver Julien Andlauer aboard the No. 30 Oreca 07. Starting 6th in class, the car was in the LMP2 lead fight for nearly 20 hours, before a front-left brake failure ended its race.

== Racing record ==
=== 24 Hours of Le Mans results ===
Year	Entrant	No.	Car	Drivers	Class	Laps	Pos.	Class Pos.
2019	(France) Duqueine Engineering	30	Oreca 07-Gibson	(France) Romain Dumas (France) Nico Jamin (France) Pierre Ragues	LMP2	363	12th	7th
2020	(France) Duqueine Team	30	Oreca 07-Gibson	(France) Tristan Gommendy (Switzerland) Jonathan Hirschi (Russia) Konstantin Tereshchenko	LMP2	100	DNF	DNF
2021	(France) Duqueine Team	30	Oreca 07-Gibson	(Austria) René Binder (France) Tristan Gommendy (Mexico) Memo Rojas	LMP2	357	14th	9th
2022	(France) Duqueine Team	30	Oreca 07-Gibson	(United Kingdom) Richard Bradley (France) Reshad de Gerus (Mexico) Memo Rojas	LMP2	326	52nd	25th
2023	(France) Duqueine Team	30	Oreca 07-Gibson	(Austria) René Binder (Switzerland) Neel Jani (Chile) Nico Pino	LMP2	327	11th	3rd
2024	(Italy) Isotta Fraschini	11	Isotta Fraschini Tipo 6 LMH-C	(Thailand) Carl Bennett (Canada) Antonio Serravalle (France) Jean-Karl Vernay	Hypercar	302	14th	14th
2024	(France) Duqueine Team	30	Oreca 07-Gibson	(Australia) James Allen (United States) John Falb (France) Jean-Baptiste Simmenauer	LMP2 (Pro-Am)	112	DNF	DNF
2026	(France) Duqueine Team	30	Oreca 07-Gibson	(France) Julien Andlauer (France) Doriane Pin (Netherlands) Richard Verschoor	LMP2	307	DNF	DNF

=== European Le Mans Series ===
Year	Entrant	Class	No	Chassis	Engine	Drivers	1	2	3	4	5	6	Pos.	Pts
2016	(France) Duqueine Engineering	LMP3	19	Ligier JS P3	Nissan VK50VE 5.0 L V8	(France) David Hallyday (France) Dino Lunardi (Switzerland) David Droux	SIL; 4	IMO; 4	RBR; 2	LEC; 2	SPA; Ret	EST; 9	3rd	62
2016	(France) Duqueine Engineering	LMP3	20	Ligier JS P3	Nissan VK50VE 5.0 L V8	(France) Eric Clement (France) Maxime Pialat (France) Romain Iannetta 1–2 (Switzerland) Antonin Borga 3–6	SIL; 10	IMO; 11	RBR; 11	LEC; 13	SPA; 10	EST; Ret	18th	3.5
2017	(France) Duqueine Engineering	LMP3	7	Ligier JS P3 (rounds 1–2); Norma M30 (rounds 3–6)	Nissan VK50VE 5.0 L V8	(Switzerland) Antonin Borga (Switzerland) David Droux (France) Nicolas Schatz	SIL; 11	MNZ; 8	RBR; 9	LEC; Ret	SPA; 2	ALG; 4	8th	37.5
2017	(France) Duqueine Engineering	LMP3	8	Ligier JS P3 (rounds 1–2); Norma M30 (rounds 3–6)	Nissan VK50VE 5.0 L V8	(France) Vincent Beltoise (France) Henry Hassid 1–2 (Switzerland) Lucas Légeret 2–6 (Sweden) Douglas Lundberg 3 (France) Nicolas Melin 4–6	SIL; Ret	MNZ; 13	RBR; 11	LEC; NC	SPA; 13	ALG; 10	17th	2.5
2018	(France) Duqueine Engineering	LMP2	29	Oreca 07	Gibson GK428 4.2 L V8	(France) Nico Jamin (France) Nelson Panciatici (France) Pierre Ragues	LEC; 3	MNZ; 6	RBR; DSQ	SIL; 7	SPA; 5‡	ALG; Ret	8th	35
2019	(France) Duqueine Engineering	LMP2	30	Oreca 07	Gibson GK428 4.2L V8	(United Kingdom) Richard Bradley (France) Nico Jamin (France) Pierre Ragues	LEC; 3	MNZ; 6	CAT; 4	SIL; Ret	SPA; 5	ALG; Ret	6th	45
2020	(France) Duqueine Team	LMP2	30	Oreca 07	Gibson GK428 4.2 L V8	(France) Tristan Gommendy (Switzerland) Jonathan Hirschi (Russia) Konstantin Tereshchenko	LEC; Ret	SPA; 4	LEC; 9	MNZ; 7	ALG; 2		6th	38
2021	(France) Duqueine Team	LMP2	30	Oreca 07	Gibson GK428 4.2 L V8	(Austria) René Binder (France) Tristan Gommendy (Mexico) Memo Rojas	CAT; 6	RBR; 9	LEC; 4	MNZ; 5	SPA; 2	ALG; NC	5th	52
2022	(France) Duqueine Team	LMP2	30	Oreca 07	Gibson GK428 4.2 L V8	(United Kingdom) Richard Bradley (Mexico) Memo Rojas (France) Reshad de Gerus 1–3 (Denmark) Anders Fjordbach 4 (France) Mathieu de Barbuat 5 (Portugal) Rui Andrade 6	LEC; 12	IMO; 6	MNZ; Ret	CAT; 6	SPA; 9	ALG; 9	10th	20
2023	(France) Duqueine Team	LMP2	30	Oreca 07	Gibson GK428 4.2 L V8	(Austria) René Binder (Switzerland) Neel Jani (Chile) Nico Pino	CAT; 1	LEC; 2	ARA; 6	SPA; 6	ALG; 5	POR; 5	4th	79
2024	(France) Duqueine Team	LMP2	30	Oreca 07	Gibson GK428 4.2 L V8	(Australia) James Allen (France) Jean-Baptiste Simmenauer (Netherlands) Niels Koolen 1–3, 5–6 (Sweden) Rasmus Lindh 4	CAT; 11	LEC; 6	IMO; 9	SPA; 12	MUG; 8	ALG; 7	13th	20
2025	(France) Duqueine Team	LMP2	30	Oreca 07	Gibson GK428 4.2 L V8	(France) Reshad de Gerus (Israel) Roy Nissany (Italy) Francesco Simonazzi 1-3 (Denmark) Benjamin Pedersen 4-6	CAT; RET	LEC; 7	IMO; 9	SPA; 10	SIL; 11	ALG; RET	15th	10
2026	(France) Duqueine Team	LMP2 Pro/Am	30	Oreca 07	Gibson GK428 4.2 L V8	(France) Doriane Pin (Netherlands) Richard Verschoor (Italy) Giorgio Roda	CAT; 3	LEC; 3	IMO	SPA	SIL	ALG	3rd*	31*

* Season still in progress.

== Cars ==
Year	Car	Image	Category
2020	Duqueine D08		LMP3
2025	Duqueine D09		LMP3
