= 2016 4 Hours of Estoril =

Layout of Circuito do Estoril

The 2016 4 Hours of Estoril was an endurance motor race held at Circuito do Estoril in Alcabideche, Portugal on 22–23 October 2016. It was the sixth and final round of the 2016 European Le Mans Series.

== Race ==
=== Race result ===
Class winners in bold.

Pos	Class	No.	Team	Drivers	Chassis	Tyre	Laps
Pos	Class	No.	Team	Drivers	Engine	Tyre	Laps
1	**LMP2**	**38**	**(Russia) G-Drive Racing**	**(United Kingdom) Simon Dolan** **(Netherlands) Giedo van der Garde** **(United Kingdom) Harry Tincknell**	**Gibson 015S**	D	**145**
1	**LMP2**	**38**	**(Russia) G-Drive Racing**	**(United Kingdom) Simon Dolan** **(Netherlands) Giedo van der Garde** **(United Kingdom) Harry Tincknell**	**Nissan VK45DE 4.5 L V8**	D	**145**
2	LMP2	21	(United States) DragonSpeed	(United Kingdom) Ben Hanley (Sweden) Henrik Hedman (France) Nicolas Lapierre	Oreca 05	D	145
2	LMP2	21	(United States) DragonSpeed	(United Kingdom) Ben Hanley (Sweden) Henrik Hedman (France) Nicolas Lapierre	Nissan VK45DE 4.5 L V8	D	145
3	LMP2	32	(Russia) SMP Racing	(Monaco) Stefano Coletti (Germany) Andreas Wirth (Russia) Vitaly Petrov	BR Engineering BR01	D	145
3	LMP2	32	(Russia) SMP Racing	(Monaco) Stefano Coletti (Germany) Andreas Wirth (Russia) Vitaly Petrov	Nissan VK45DE 4.5 L V8	D	145
4	LMP2	40	(United States) Krohn Racing	(United States) Tracy Krohn (Sweden) Niclas Jönsson (France) Olivier Pla	Ligier JS P2	MI	145
4	LMP2	40	(United States) Krohn Racing	(United States) Tracy Krohn (Sweden) Niclas Jönsson (France) Olivier Pla	Nissan VK45DE 4.5 L V8	MI	145
5	LMP2	33	(Philippines) Eurasia Motorsport	(France) Tristan Gommendy (United Kingdom) Michael Lyons (Belgium) Frédéric Vervisch	Oreca 05	D	143
5	LMP2	33	(Philippines) Eurasia Motorsport	(France) Tristan Gommendy (United Kingdom) Michael Lyons (Belgium) Frédéric Vervisch	Nissan VK45DE 4.5 L V8	D	143
6	LMP2	28	(France) IDEC Sport Racing	(France) Dimitri Enjalbert (France) Patrice Lafargue (France) Paul Lafargue	Ligier JS P2	MI	141
6	LMP2	28	(France) IDEC Sport Racing	(France) Dimitri Enjalbert (France) Patrice Lafargue (France) Paul Lafargue	Judd HK 3.6 L V8	MI	141
7	**LMP3**	**18**	**(France) M.Racing - YMR**	**(France) Alexandre Cougnaud** **(France) Yann Ehrlacher** **(France) Thomas Laurent**	**Ligier JS P3**	MI	**140**
7	**LMP3**	**18**	**(France) M.Racing - YMR**	**(France) Alexandre Cougnaud** **(France) Yann Ehrlacher** **(France) Thomas Laurent**	**Nissan VK50 5.0 L V8**	MI	**140**
8	LMP2	23	(France) Panis Barthez Competition	(France) Fabien Barthez (France) Timothé Buret (France) Paul-Loup Chatin	Ligier JS P2	MI	139
8	LMP2	23	(France) Panis Barthez Competition	(France) Fabien Barthez (France) Timothé Buret (France) Paul-Loup Chatin	Nissan VK45DE 4.5 L V8	MI	139
9	LMP3	3	(United States) United Autosports	(United Kingdom) Matthew Bell (United Kingdom) Wayne Boyd (United States) Mark Patterson	Ligier JS P3	MI	138
9	LMP3	3	(United States) United Autosports	(United Kingdom) Matthew Bell (United Kingdom) Wayne Boyd (United States) Mark Patterson	Nissan VK50 5.0 L V8	MI	138
10	LMP3	9	(France) Graff	(France) Paul Petit (France) Enzo Guibbert (France) Eric Trouillet	Ligier JS P3	MI	138
10	LMP3	9	(France) Graff	(France) Paul Petit (France) Enzo Guibbert (France) Eric Trouillet	Nissan VK50 5.0 L V8	MI	138
11	LMP3	10	(France) Graff	(United States) John Falb (Venezuela) Enzo Potolicchio (United States) Sean Rayhall	Ligier JS P3	MI	137
11	LMP3	10	(France) Graff	(United States) John Falb (Venezuela) Enzo Potolicchio (United States) Sean Rayhall	Nissan VK50 5.0 L V8	MI	137
12	LMP3	13	(Poland) Inter Europol Competition	(Germany) Jens Petersen (Poland) Jakub Śmiechowski	Ligier JS P3	MI	137
12	LMP3	13	(Poland) Inter Europol Competition	(Germany) Jens Petersen (Poland) Jakub Śmiechowski	Nissan VK50 5.0 L V8	MI	137
13	LMP3	12	(United States) Eurointernational	(Italy) Andrea Dromedari (Netherlands) Rik Breukers (Portugal) Miguel Faisca	Ligier JS P3	MI	137
13	LMP3	12	(United States) Eurointernational	(Italy) Andrea Dromedari (Netherlands) Rik Breukers (Portugal) Miguel Faisca	Nissan VK50 5.0 L V8	MI	137
14	LMP3	8	(Switzerland) Race Performance	(Belgium) Bert Longin (Switzerland) Giorgio Maggi (Switzerland) Nicolas Leutwiler	Ligier JS P3	MI	137
14	LMP3	8	(Switzerland) Race Performance	(Belgium) Bert Longin (Switzerland) Giorgio Maggi (Switzerland) Nicolas Leutwiler	Nissan VK50 5.0 L V8	MI	137
15	LMP3	7	(Italy) Villorba Corse	(Italy) Roberto Lacorte (Italy) Giorgio Sernagiotto	Ligier JS P3	MI	137
15	LMP3	7	(Italy) Villorba Corse	(Italy) Roberto Lacorte (Italy) Giorgio Sernagiotto	Nissan VK50 5.0 L V8	MI	137
16	LMP3	19	(France) Duqueine Engineering	(France) David Hallyday (France) Dino Lunardi (Switzerland) David Droux	Ligier JS P3	MI	136
16	LMP3	19	(France) Duqueine Engineering	(France) David Hallyday (France) Dino Lunardi (Switzerland) David Droux	Nissan VK50 5.0 L V8	MI	136
17	LMP3	15	(United Kingdom) RLR MSport	(Denmark) Morten Dons (United Kingdom) Alasdair McCaig (United Kingdom) Anthony Wells	Ligier JS P3	MI	136
17	LMP3	15	(United Kingdom) RLR MSport	(Denmark) Morten Dons (United Kingdom) Alasdair McCaig (United Kingdom) Anthony Wells	Nissan VK50 5.0 L V8	MI	136
18	**LMGTE**	**99**	**(United Kingdom) Aston Martin Racing**	**(United Kingdom) Andrew Howard** **(United Kingdom) Alex MacDowall** **(United Kingdom) Darren Turner**	**Aston Martin Vantage GTE**	D	**136**
18	**LMGTE**	**99**	**(United Kingdom) Aston Martin Racing**	**(United Kingdom) Andrew Howard** **(United Kingdom) Alex MacDowall** **(United Kingdom) Darren Turner**	**Aston Martin 4.5 L V8**	D	**136**
19	LMGTE	56	(Austria) AT Racing	(Belarus) Alexander Talkanitsa, Jr. (Belarus) Alexander Talkanitsa, Sr. (Italy) Alessandro Pier Guidi	Ferrari 458 Italia GT2	D	135
19	LMGTE	56	(Austria) AT Racing	(Belarus) Alexander Talkanitsa, Jr. (Belarus) Alexander Talkanitsa, Sr. (Italy) Alessandro Pier Guidi	Ferrari 4.5 L V8	D	135
20	LMP3	2	(United States) United Autosports	(United Kingdom) Alex Brundle (United Kingdom) Christian England (United States) Mike Guasch	Ligier JS P3	MI	135
20	LMP3	2	(United States) United Autosports	(United Kingdom) Alex Brundle (United Kingdom) Christian England (United States) Mike Guasch	Nissan VK50 5.0 L V8	MI	135
21	LMGTE	55	(Italy) AF Corse	(United Kingdom) Duncan Cameron (Republic of Ireland) Matt Griffin (United Kingdom) Aaron Scott	Ferrari 458 Italia GT2	D	135
21	LMGTE	55	(Italy) AF Corse	(United Kingdom) Duncan Cameron (Republic of Ireland) Matt Griffin (United Kingdom) Aaron Scott	Ferrari 4.5 L V8	D	135
22	LMGTE	51	(Italy) AF Corse	(Portugal) Rui Águas (Italy) Marco Cioci (Italy) Piergiuseppe Perazzini	Ferrari 458 Italia GT2	D	135
22	LMGTE	51	(Italy) AF Corse	(Portugal) Rui Águas (Italy) Marco Cioci (Italy) Piergiuseppe Perazzini	Ferrari 4.5 L V8	D	135
23	LMP3	4	(France) OAK Racing	(France) Erik Maris (France) Jean-Marc Merlin	Ligier JS P3	MI	132
23	LMP3	4	(France) OAK Racing	(France) Erik Maris (France) Jean-Marc Merlin	Nissan VK50 5.0 L V8	MI	132
24	LMP3	24	(France) OAK Racing	(France) Jacques Nicolet (France) Pierre Nicolet	Ligier JS P3	MI	131
24	LMP3	24	(France) OAK Racing	(France) Jacques Nicolet (France) Pierre Nicolet	Nissan VK50 5.0 L V8	MI	131
25	LMGTE	88	(Germany) Proton Competition	(Germany) Christian Ried (United Kingdom) Ben Barker (Italy) Gianluca Roda	Porsche 911 RSR	D	131
25	LMGTE	88	(Germany) Proton Competition	(Germany) Christian Ried (United Kingdom) Ben Barker (Italy) Gianluca Roda	Porsche 4.0 L Flat-6	D	131
26	LMP3	17	(France) Ultimate	(France) François Hériau (France) Jean-Baptiste Lahaye (France) Matthieu Lahaye	Ligier JS P3	MI	129
26	LMP3	17	(France) Ultimate	(France) François Hériau (France) Jean-Baptiste Lahaye (France) Matthieu Lahaye	Nissan VK50 5.0 L V8	MI	129
27	LMGTE	77	(Germany) Proton Competition	(United States) Mike Hedlund (Germany) Wolf Henzler (Germany) Marco Seefried	Porsche 911 RSR	D	125
27	LMGTE	77	(Germany) Proton Competition	(United States) Mike Hedlund (Germany) Wolf Henzler (Germany) Marco Seefried	Porsche 4.0 L Flat-6	D	125
28	LMP2	46	(France) Thiriet by TDS Racing	(Switzerland) Mathias Beche (France) Pierre Thiriet (Japan) Ryō Hirakawa	Oreca 05	D	121
28	LMP2	46	(France) Thiriet by TDS Racing	(Switzerland) Mathias Beche (France) Pierre Thiriet (Japan) Ryō Hirakawa	Nissan VK45DE 4.5 L V8	D	121
DNF	LMP3	20	(France) Duqueine Engineering	(France) Eric Clement (France) Maxime Pialat (Switzerland) Antonin Borga	Ligier JS P3	MI	130
DNF	LMP3	20	(France) Duqueine Engineering	(France) Eric Clement (France) Maxime Pialat (Switzerland) Antonin Borga	Nissan VK50 5.0 L V8	MI	130
DNF	LMP3	16	(France) Panis Barthez Competition	(France) Eric Debard (France) Simon Gachet (France) Valentin Moineault	Ligier JS P3	MI	106
DNF	LMP3	16	(France) Panis Barthez Competition	(France) Eric Debard (France) Simon Gachet (France) Valentin Moineault	Nissan VK50 5.0 L V8	MI	106
DNF	LMP2	41	(United Kingdom) Greaves Motorsport	(France) Julien Canal (Mexico) Memo Rojas (France) Nathanaël Berthon	Ligier JS P2	D	87
DNF	LMP2	41	(United Kingdom) Greaves Motorsport	(France) Julien Canal (Mexico) Memo Rojas (France) Nathanaël Berthon	Nissan VK45DE 4.5 L V8	D	87
DNF	LMP3	11	(United States) Eurointernational	(Italy) Giorgio Mondini (United Kingdom) Jay Palmer	Ligier JS P3	MI	84
DNF	LMP3	11	(United States) Eurointernational	(Italy) Giorgio Mondini (United Kingdom) Jay Palmer	Nissan VK50 5.0 L V8	MI	84
DNF	LMP3	6	(United Kingdom) 360 Racing	(United Kingdom) Ross Kaiser (United Kingdom) James Swift (United Kingdom) Terrence Woodward	Ligier JS P3	MI	82
DNF	LMP3	6	(United Kingdom) 360 Racing	(United Kingdom) Ross Kaiser (United Kingdom) James Swift (United Kingdom) Terrence Woodward	Nissan VK50 5.0 L V8	MI	82
DNF	LMGTE	66	(United Kingdom) JMW Motorsport	(Italy) Andrea Bertolini (United Kingdom) Robert Smith (United Kingdom) Rory Butcher	Ferrari 458 Italia GT2	D	45
DNF	LMGTE	66	(United Kingdom) JMW Motorsport	(Italy) Andrea Bertolini (United Kingdom) Robert Smith (United Kingdom) Rory Butcher	Ferrari 4.5 L V8	D	45
DNF	LMGTE	60	(Denmark) Formula Racing	(Denmark) Johnny Laursen (Denmark) Mikkel Mac (Denmark) Christina Nielsen	Ferrari 458 Italia GT2	D	32
DNF	LMGTE	60	(Denmark) Formula Racing	(Denmark) Johnny Laursen (Denmark) Mikkel Mac (Denmark) Christina Nielsen	Ferrari 4.5 L V8	D	32
EX	LMP2	29	(Germany) Pegasus Racing	(France) Léo Roussel (France) Inès Taittinger (France) Julien Schell	Morgan LMP2	MI	139
EX	LMP2	29	(Germany) Pegasus Racing	(France) Léo Roussel (France) Inès Taittinger (France) Julien Schell	Nissan VK45DE 4.5 L V8	MI	139

European Le Mans Series
Previous race: Spa	2016 season	Next race: none
