= 2016 4 Hours of Imola =

Layout of Imola Circuit

The 2016 4 Hours of Imola was an endurance motor race held at Imola Circuit in Imola, Italy on 14–15 May 2016. It was the second round of the 2016 European Le Mans Series.

== Race ==
=== Race result ===
Class winners in bold.

Pos	Class	No.	Team	Drivers	Chassis	Tyre	Laps
Pos	Class	No.	Team	Drivers	Engine	Tyre	Laps
1	**LMP2**	**46**	**(France) Thiriet by TDS Racing**	**(Switzerland) Mathias Beche** **(France) Pierre Thiriet** **(Japan) Ryō Hirakawa**	**Oreca 05**	D	**121**
1	**LMP2**	**46**	**(France) Thiriet by TDS Racing**	**(Switzerland) Mathias Beche** **(France) Pierre Thiriet** **(Japan) Ryō Hirakawa**	**Nissan VK45DE 4.5 L V8**	D	**121**
2	LMP2	38	(Russia) G-Drive Racing	(United Kingdom) Simon Dolan (Netherlands) Giedo van der Garde (United Kingdom) Harry Tincknell	Gibson 015S	D	121
2	LMP2	38	(Russia) G-Drive Racing	(United Kingdom) Simon Dolan (Netherlands) Giedo van der Garde (United Kingdom) Harry Tincknell	Nissan VK45DE 4.5 L V8	D	121
3	LMP2	21	(United States) DragonSpeed	(United Kingdom) Ben Hanley (Sweden) Henrik Hedman (France) Nicolas Lapierre	Oreca 05	D	121
3	LMP2	21	(United States) DragonSpeed	(United Kingdom) Ben Hanley (Sweden) Henrik Hedman (France) Nicolas Lapierre	Nissan VK45DE 4.5 L V8	D	121
4	LMP2	32	(Russia) SMP Racing	(Monaco) Stefano Coletti (Germany) Andreas Wirth (Colombia) Julián Leal	BR Engineering BR01	D	121
4	LMP2	32	(Russia) SMP Racing	(Monaco) Stefano Coletti (Germany) Andreas Wirth (Colombia) Julián Leal	Nissan VK45DE 4.5 L V8	D	121
5	LMP2	33	(Philippines) Eurasia Motorsport	(France) Tristan Gommendy (Netherlands) Nick de Bruijn (China) Pu Jun Jin	Oreca 05	D	121
5	LMP2	33	(Philippines) Eurasia Motorsport	(France) Tristan Gommendy (Netherlands) Nick de Bruijn (China) Pu Jun Jin	Nissan VK45DE 4.5 L V8	D	121
6	LMP2	40	(United States) Krohn Racing	(Sweden) Björn Wirdheim (Sweden) Niclas Jönsson (France) Olivier Pla	Ligier JS P2	M	120
6	LMP2	40	(United States) Krohn Racing	(Sweden) Björn Wirdheim (Sweden) Niclas Jönsson (France) Olivier Pla	Nissan VK45DE 4.5 L V8	M	120
7	LMP2	23	(France) Panis Barthez Competition	(France) Fabien Barthez (France) Timothé Buret (France) Paul-Loup Chatin	Ligier JS P2	M	120
7	LMP2	23	(France) Panis Barthez Competition	(France) Fabien Barthez (France) Timothé Buret (France) Paul-Loup Chatin	Nissan VK45DE 4.5 L V8	M	120
8	LMP2	41	(United Kingdom) Greaves Motorsport	(France) Julien Canal (Mexico) Memo Rojas (Poland) Kuba Giermaziak	Ligier JS P2	D	118
8	LMP2	41	(United Kingdom) Greaves Motorsport	(France) Julien Canal (Mexico) Memo Rojas (Poland) Kuba Giermaziak	Nissan VK45DE 4.5 L V8	D	118
9	LMP2	34	(Switzerland) Race Performance	(Switzerland) Nicolas Leutwiler (United Kingdom) James Winslow (Japan) Shinji Nakano	Oreca 03R	D	118
9	LMP2	34	(Switzerland) Race Performance	(Switzerland) Nicolas Leutwiler (United Kingdom) James Winslow (Japan) Shinji Nakano	Judd HK 3.6 L V8	D	118
10	LMP2	48	(Republic of Ireland) Murphy Prototypes	(Republic of Ireland) Sean Doyle (United Kingdom) Gary Findlay (United Kingdom) Patrick McClughan	Oreca 03R	D	118
10	LMP2	48	(Republic of Ireland) Murphy Prototypes	(Republic of Ireland) Sean Doyle (United Kingdom) Gary Findlay (United Kingdom) Patrick McClughan	Nissan VK45DE 4.5 L V8	D	118
11	LMP2	22	(France) SO24! By Lombard Racing	(France) Vincent Capillaire (United Kingdom) Jonathan Coleman (France) Olivier Lombard	Ligier JS P2	D	117
11	LMP2	22	(France) SO24! By Lombard Racing	(France) Vincent Capillaire (United Kingdom) Jonathan Coleman (France) Olivier Lombard	Judd HK 3.6 L V8	D	117
12	LMP2	29	(Germany) Pegasus Racing	(France) Léo Roussel (France) Inès Taittinger (France) Rémy Striebig	Morgan LMP2	M	116
12	LMP2	29	(Germany) Pegasus Racing	(France) Léo Roussel (France) Inès Taittinger (France) Rémy Striebig	Nissan VK45DE 4.5 L V8	M	116
13	**LMGTE**	**77**	**(Germany) Proton Competition**	**(United States) Mike Hedlund** **(Germany) Wolf Henzler** **(Germany) Robert Renauer**	**Porsche 911 RSR**	D	**116**
13	**LMGTE**	**77**	**(Germany) Proton Competition**	**(United States) Mike Hedlund** **(Germany) Wolf Henzler** **(Germany) Robert Renauer**	**Porsche 4.0 L Flat-6**	D	**116**
14	**LMP3**	**2**	**(United States) United Autosports**	**(United Kingdom) Alex Brundle** **(United Kingdom) Christian England** **(United States) Mike Guasch**	**Ligier JS P3**	M	**115**
14	**LMP3**	**2**	**(United States) United Autosports**	**(United Kingdom) Alex Brundle** **(United Kingdom) Christian England** **(United States) Mike Guasch**	**Nissan VK50 5.0 L V8**	M	**115**
15	LMP3	11	(United States) Eurointernational	(Italy) Giorgio Mondini (Italy) Marco Jacoboni (Italy) Andrea Roda	Ligier JS P3	M	115
15	LMP3	11	(United States) Eurointernational	(Italy) Giorgio Mondini (Italy) Marco Jacoboni (Italy) Andrea Roda	Nissan VK50 5.0 L V8	M	115
16	LMGTE	66	(United Kingdom) JMW Motorsport	(Italy) Andrea Bertolini (United Kingdom) Robert Smith (United Kingdom) Rory Butcher	Ferrari 458 Italia GT2	D	115
16	LMGTE	66	(United Kingdom) JMW Motorsport	(Italy) Andrea Bertolini (United Kingdom) Robert Smith (United Kingdom) Rory Butcher	Ferrari 4.5 L V8	D	115
17	LMP3	16	(France) Panis Barthez Competition	(France) Eric Debard (France) Simon Gachet (France) Valentin Moineault	Ligier JS P3	M	115
17	LMP3	16	(France) Panis Barthez Competition	(France) Eric Debard (France) Simon Gachet (France) Valentin Moineault	Nissan VK50 5.0 L V8	M	115
18	LMP3	19	(France) Duqueine Engineering	(France) David Hallyday (France) Dino Lunardi (Switzerland) David Droux	Ligier JS P3	M	115
18	LMP3	19	(France) Duqueine Engineering	(France) David Hallyday (France) Dino Lunardi (Switzerland) David Droux	Nissan VK50 5.0 L V8	M	115
19	LMP3	18	(France) M.Racing - YMR	(France) Alexandre Cougnaud (France) Yann Ehrlacher (France) Thomas Laurent	Ligier JS P3	M	115
19	LMP3	18	(France) M.Racing - YMR	(France) Alexandre Cougnaud (France) Yann Ehrlacher (France) Thomas Laurent	Nissan VK50 5.0 L V8	M	115
20	LMP3	15	(United Kingdom) RLR MSport	(Denmark) Morten Dons (United Kingdom) Ossy Yusuf	Ligier JS P3	M	114
20	LMP3	15	(United Kingdom) RLR MSport	(Denmark) Morten Dons (United Kingdom) Ossy Yusuf	Nissan VK50 5.0 L V8	M	114
21	LMP3	3	(United States) United Autosports	(United Kingdom) Matthew Bell (United Kingdom) Wayne Boyd (United States) Mark Patterson	Ligier JS P3	M	114
21	LMP3	3	(United States) United Autosports	(United Kingdom) Matthew Bell (United Kingdom) Wayne Boyd (United States) Mark Patterson	Nissan VK50 5.0 L V8	M	114
22	LMGTE	56	(Austria) AT Racing	(Belarus) Alexander Talkanitsa, Jr. (Belarus) Alexander Talkanitsa, Sr. (Italy) Davide Rigon	Ferrari 458 Italia GT2	D	114
22	LMGTE	56	(Austria) AT Racing	(Belarus) Alexander Talkanitsa, Jr. (Belarus) Alexander Talkanitsa, Sr. (Italy) Davide Rigon	Ferrari 4.5 L V8	D	114
23	LMGTE	88	(Germany) Proton Competition	(Germany) Christian Ried (Austria) Klaus Bachler (Italy) Gianluca Roda	Porsche 911 RSR	D	114
23	LMGTE	88	(Germany) Proton Competition	(Germany) Christian Ried (Austria) Klaus Bachler (Italy) Gianluca Roda	Porsche 4.0 L Flat-6	D	114
24	LMGTE	99	(United Kingdom) Aston Martin Racing	(United Kingdom) Andrew Howard (United Kingdom) Alex MacDowall (United Kingdom) Darren Turner	Aston Martin Vantage GTE	D	114
24	LMGTE	99	(United Kingdom) Aston Martin Racing	(United Kingdom) Andrew Howard (United Kingdom) Alex MacDowall (United Kingdom) Darren Turner	Aston Martin 4.5 L V8	D	114
25	LMP3	12	(United States) Eurointernational	(Italy) Andrea Dromedari (Italy) Fabio Mancini (Russia) Roman Rusinov	Ligier JS P3	M	114
25	LMP3	12	(United States) Eurointernational	(Italy) Andrea Dromedari (Italy) Fabio Mancini (Russia) Roman Rusinov	Nissan VK50 5.0 L V8	M	114
26	LMGTE	55	(Italy) AF Corse	(United Kingdom) Duncan Cameron (Republic of Ireland) Matt Griffin (United Kingdom) Aaron Scott	Ferrari 458 Italia GT2	D	114
26	LMGTE	55	(Italy) AF Corse	(United Kingdom) Duncan Cameron (Republic of Ireland) Matt Griffin (United Kingdom) Aaron Scott	Ferrari 4.5 L V8	D	114
27	LMP3	6	(United Kingdom) 360 Racing	(United Kingdom) Ross Kaiser (United Kingdom) James Swift (United Kingdom) Terrence Woodward	Ligier JS P3	M	114
27	LMP3	6	(United Kingdom) 360 Racing	(United Kingdom) Ross Kaiser (United Kingdom) James Swift (United Kingdom) Terrence Woodward	Nissan VK50 5.0 L V8	M	114
28	LMGTE	51	(Italy) AF Corse	(Portugal) Rui Águas (Italy) Marco Cioci (Italy) Piergiuseppe Perazzini	Ferrari 458 Italia GT2	D	113
28	LMGTE	51	(Italy) AF Corse	(Portugal) Rui Águas (Italy) Marco Cioci (Italy) Piergiuseppe Perazzini	Ferrari 4.5 L V8	D	113
29	LMP3	17	(France) Ultimate	(France) François Hériau (France) Jean-Baptiste Lahaye (France) Matthieu Lahaye	Ligier JS P3	M	113
29	LMP3	17	(France) Ultimate	(France) François Hériau (France) Jean-Baptiste Lahaye (France) Matthieu Lahaye	Nissan VK50 5.0 L V8	M	113
30	LMP3	20	(France) Duqueine Engineering	(France) Eric Clement (France) Maxime Pialat (France) Romain Iannetta	Ligier JS P3	M	113
30	LMP3	20	(France) Duqueine Engineering	(France) Eric Clement (France) Maxime Pialat (France) Romain Iannetta	Nissan VK50 5.0 L V8	M	113
31	LMP3	14	(Republic of Ireland) MurphyP3-3Dimensional.com	(United Kingdom) Barrie Baxter (United Kingdom) Rob Garofall (United Kingdom) Alex Kapadia	Ligier JS P3	M	112
31	LMP3	14	(Republic of Ireland) MurphyP3-3Dimensional.com	(United Kingdom) Barrie Baxter (United Kingdom) Rob Garofall (United Kingdom) Alex Kapadia	Nissan VK50 5.0 L V8	M	112
32	LMP3	8	(Switzerland) Race Performance	(Belgium) Bert Longin (Switzerland) Giorgio Maggi (Switzerland) Marcello Marateotto	Ligier JS P3	M	110
32	LMP3	8	(Switzerland) Race Performance	(Belgium) Bert Longin (Switzerland) Giorgio Maggi (Switzerland) Marcello Marateotto	Nissan VK50 5.0 L V8	M	110
33	LMP3	4	(France) OAK Racing	(France) Erik Maris (France) Jean-Marc Merlin	Ligier JS P3	M	109
33	LMP3	4	(France) OAK Racing	(France) Erik Maris (France) Jean-Marc Merlin	Nissan VK50 5.0 L V8	M	109
34	LMP3	13	(Poland) Inter Europol Competition	(Germany) Jens Petersen (Poland) Jakub Śmiechowski	Ligier JS P3	M	105
34	LMP3	13	(Poland) Inter Europol Competition	(Germany) Jens Petersen (Poland) Jakub Śmiechowski	Nissan VK50 5.0 L V8	M	105
35	LMP3	7	(Italy) Villorba Corse	(Italy) Roberto Lacorte (Italy) Giorgio Sernagiotto (Italy) Niccolò Schirò	Ligier JS P3	M	103
35	LMP3	7	(Italy) Villorba Corse	(Italy) Roberto Lacorte (Italy) Giorgio Sernagiotto (Italy) Niccolò Schirò	Nissan VK50 5.0 L V8	M	103
36	LMP3	24	(France) OAK Racing	(France) Jacques Nicolet (France) Pierre Nicolet	Ligier JS P3	M	94
36	LMP3	24	(France) OAK Racing	(France) Jacques Nicolet (France) Pierre Nicolet	Nissan VK50 5.0 L V8	M	94
DNF	LMP3	10	(France) Graff	(United States) John Falb (Venezuela) Enzo Potolicchio (United States) Sean Rayhall	Ligier JS P3	M	93
DNF	LMP3	10	(France) Graff	(United States) John Falb (Venezuela) Enzo Potolicchio (United States) Sean Rayhall	Nissan VK50 5.0 L V8	M	93
DNF	LMP2	25	(Portugal) Algarve Pro Racing	(United Kingdom) Michael Munemann (India) Parth Ghorpade (United Kingdom) Chris Hoy	Ligier JS P2	D	90
DNF	LMP2	25	(Portugal) Algarve Pro Racing	(United Kingdom) Michael Munemann (India) Parth Ghorpade (United Kingdom) Chris Hoy	Nissan VK45DE 4.5 L V8	D	90
DNF	LMP2	28	(France) IDEC Sport Racing	(France) Dimitri Enjalbert (France) Patrice Lafargue (France) Paul Lafargue	Ligier JS P2	D	80
DNF	LMP2	28	(France) IDEC Sport Racing	(France) Dimitri Enjalbert (France) Patrice Lafargue (France) Paul Lafargue	Judd HK 3.6 L V8	D	80
DNF	LMP3	5	(Spain) By Speed Factory	(United Kingdom) Tom Jackson (Spain) Álvaro Fontes (Spain) Jesús Fuster	Ligier JS P3	M	67
DNF	LMP3	5	(Spain) By Speed Factory	(United Kingdom) Tom Jackson (Spain) Álvaro Fontes (Spain) Jesús Fuster	Nissan VK50 5.0 L V8	M	67
EX	LMP3	9	(France) Graff	(France) Paul Petit (France) Enzo Guibbert (France) Eric Trouillet	Ligier JS P3	M	111
EX	LMP3	9	(France) Graff	(France) Paul Petit (France) Enzo Guibbert (France) Eric Trouillet	Nissan VK50 5.0 L V8	M	111
DNS	LMGTE	60	(Denmark) Formula Racing	(Denmark) Johnny Laursen (Denmark) Mikkel Mac (Denmark) Christina Nielsen	Ferrari 458 Italia GT2	D	0
DNS	LMGTE	60	(Denmark) Formula Racing	(Denmark) Johnny Laursen (Denmark) Mikkel Mac (Denmark) Christina Nielsen	Ferrari 4.5 L V8	D	0

European Le Mans Series
Previous race: Silverstone	2016 season	Next race: Red Bull Ring
