= 2016 4 Hours of Le Castellet =

Layout of Circuit Paul Ricard

The 2016 4 Hours of Le Castellet was an endurance motor race held at Circuit Paul Ricard in Le Castellet, France on 27–28 August 2016. It was the fourth round of the 2016 European Le Mans Series.

== Race ==
=== Race result ===
Class winners in bold.

Pos	Class	No.	Team	Drivers	Chassis	Tyre	Laps
Pos	Class	No.	Team	Drivers	Engine	Tyre	Laps
1	**LMP2**	**46**	**(France) Thiriet by TDS Racing**	**(Switzerland) Mathias Beche** **(France) Pierre Thiriet** **(United Kingdom) Mike Conway**	**Oreca 05**	D	**124**
1	**LMP2**	**46**	**(France) Thiriet by TDS Racing**	**(Switzerland) Mathias Beche** **(France) Pierre Thiriet** **(United Kingdom) Mike Conway**	**Nissan VK45DE 4.5 L V8**	D	**124**
2	LMP2	32	(Russia) SMP Racing	(Monaco) Stefano Coletti (Germany) Andreas Wirth (Colombia) Julián Leal	BR Engineering BR01	D	123
2	LMP2	32	(Russia) SMP Racing	(Monaco) Stefano Coletti (Germany) Andreas Wirth (Colombia) Julián Leal	Nissan VK45DE 4.5 L V8	D	123
3	LMP2	21	(United States) DragonSpeed	(United Kingdom) Ben Hanley (Sweden) Henrik Hedman (France) Nicolas Lapierre	Oreca 05	D	123
3	LMP2	21	(United States) DragonSpeed	(United Kingdom) Ben Hanley (Sweden) Henrik Hedman (France) Nicolas Lapierre	Nissan VK45DE 4.5 L V8	D	123
4	LMP2	33	(Philippines) Eurasia Motorsport	(France) Tristan Gommendy (Netherlands) Nick de Bruijn (China) Pu Jun Jin	Oreca 05	D	123
4	LMP2	33	(Philippines) Eurasia Motorsport	(France) Tristan Gommendy (Netherlands) Nick de Bruijn (China) Pu Jun Jin	Nissan VK45DE 4.5 L V8	D	123
5	LMP2	38	(Russia) G-Drive Racing	(United Kingdom) Simon Dolan (Netherlands) Giedo van der Garde (United Kingdom) Harry Tincknell	Gibson 015S	D	123
5	LMP2	38	(Russia) G-Drive Racing	(United Kingdom) Simon Dolan (Netherlands) Giedo van der Garde (United Kingdom) Harry Tincknell	Nissan VK45DE 4.5 L V8	D	123
6	LMP2	41	(United Kingdom) Greaves Motorsport	(France) Julien Canal (Mexico) Memo Rojas (France) Nathanaël Berthon	Ligier JS P2	D	123
6	LMP2	41	(United Kingdom) Greaves Motorsport	(France) Julien Canal (Mexico) Memo Rojas (France) Nathanaël Berthon	Nissan VK45DE 4.5 L V8	D	123
7	LMP2	25	(Portugal) Algarve Pro Racing	(Italy) Andrea Roda (Switzerland) Jonathan Hirschi (France) Andrea Pizzitola	Ligier JS P2	D	121
7	LMP2	25	(Portugal) Algarve Pro Racing	(Italy) Andrea Roda (Switzerland) Jonathan Hirschi (France) Andrea Pizzitola	Nissan VK45DE 4.5 L V8	D	121
8	LMP2	40	(United States) Krohn Racing	(United States) Tracy Krohn (Sweden) Niclas Jönsson (France) Olivier Pla	Ligier JS P2	MI	121
8	LMP2	40	(United States) Krohn Racing	(United States) Tracy Krohn (Sweden) Niclas Jönsson (France) Olivier Pla	Nissan VK45DE 4.5 L V8	MI	121
9	LMP2	48	(Republic of Ireland) Murphy Prototypes	(Republic of Ireland) Sean Doyle (Italy) Kevin Ceccon (United Kingdom) Jonathan Coleman	Oreca 03R	D	121
9	LMP2	48	(Republic of Ireland) Murphy Prototypes	(Republic of Ireland) Sean Doyle (Italy) Kevin Ceccon (United Kingdom) Jonathan Coleman	Nissan VK45DE 4.5 L V8	D	121
10	LMP2	28	(France) IDEC Sport Racing	(France) Dimitri Enjalbert (France) Patrice Lafargue (France) Paul Lafargue	Ligier JS P2	MI	121
10	LMP2	28	(France) IDEC Sport Racing	(France) Dimitri Enjalbert (France) Patrice Lafargue (France) Paul Lafargue	Judd HK 3.6 L V8	MI	121
11	LMP2	23	(France) Panis Barthez Competition	(France) Fabien Barthez (France) Timothé Buret (France) Paul-Loup Chatin	Ligier JS P2	MI	120
11	LMP2	23	(France) Panis Barthez Competition	(France) Fabien Barthez (France) Timothé Buret (France) Paul-Loup Chatin	Nissan VK45DE 4.5 L V8	MI	120
12	**LMP3**	**9**	**(France) Graff**	**(France) Paul Petit** **(France) Enzo Guibbert** **(France) Eric Trouillet**	**Ligier JS P3**	MI	**117**
12	**LMP3**	**9**	**(France) Graff**	**(France) Paul Petit** **(France) Enzo Guibbert** **(France) Eric Trouillet**	**Nissan VK50 5.0 L V8**	MI	**117**
13	LMP3	19	(France) Duqueine Engineering	(France) David Hallyday (France) Dino Lunardi (Switzerland) David Droux	Ligier JS P3	MI	117
13	LMP3	19	(France) Duqueine Engineering	(France) David Hallyday (France) Dino Lunardi (Switzerland) David Droux	Nissan VK50 5.0 L V8	MI	117
14	LMP3	2	(United States) United Autosports	(United Kingdom) Alex Brundle (United Kingdom) Christian England (United States) Mike Guasch	Ligier JS P3	MI	117
14	LMP3	2	(United States) United Autosports	(United Kingdom) Alex Brundle (United Kingdom) Christian England (United States) Mike Guasch	Nissan VK50 5.0 L V8	MI	117
15	LMP3	17	(France) Ultimate	(France) François Hériau (France) Jean-Baptiste Lahaye (France) Matthieu Lahaye	Ligier JS P3	MI	116
15	LMP3	17	(France) Ultimate	(France) François Hériau (France) Jean-Baptiste Lahaye (France) Matthieu Lahaye	Nissan VK50 5.0 L V8	MI	116
16	LMP3	6	(United Kingdom) 360 Racing	(United Kingdom) Ross Kaiser (United Kingdom) James Swift (United Kingdom) Terrence Woodward	Ligier JS P3	MI	116
16	LMP3	6	(United Kingdom) 360 Racing	(United Kingdom) Ross Kaiser (United Kingdom) James Swift (United Kingdom) Terrence Woodward	Nissan VK50 5.0 L V8	MI	116
17	LMP2	29	(Germany) Pegasus Racing	(France) Léo Roussel (France) Inès Taittinger (France) Rémy Striebig	Morgan LMP2	MI	116
17	LMP2	29	(Germany) Pegasus Racing	(France) Léo Roussel (France) Inès Taittinger (France) Rémy Striebig	Nissan VK45DE 4.5 L V8	MI	116
18	LMP3	26	(United Kingdom) Tockwith Motorsports	(United Kingdom) Phil Hanson (United Kingdom) Nigel Moore	Ligier JS P3	MI	116
18	LMP3	26	(United Kingdom) Tockwith Motorsports	(United Kingdom) Phil Hanson (United Kingdom) Nigel Moore	Nissan VK50 5.0 L V8	MI	116
19	LMP3	13	(Poland) Inter Europol Competition	(Germany) Jens Petersen (Poland) Jakub Śmiechowski	Ligier JS P3	MI	115
19	LMP3	13	(Poland) Inter Europol Competition	(Germany) Jens Petersen (Poland) Jakub Śmiechowski	Nissan VK50 5.0 L V8	MI	115
20	**LMGTE**	**66**	**(United Kingdom) JMW Motorsport**	**(Italy) Andrea Bertolini** **(United Kingdom) Robert Smith** **(United Kingdom) Rory Butcher**	**Ferrari 458 Italia GT2**	D	**115**
20	**LMGTE**	**66**	**(United Kingdom) JMW Motorsport**	**(Italy) Andrea Bertolini** **(United Kingdom) Robert Smith** **(United Kingdom) Rory Butcher**	**Ferrari 4.5 L V8**	D	**115**
21	LMGTE	60	(Denmark) Formula Racing	(Denmark) Johnny Laursen (Denmark) Mikkel Mac (Denmark) Mikkel Jensen	Ferrari 458 Italia GT2	D	115
21	LMGTE	60	(Denmark) Formula Racing	(Denmark) Johnny Laursen (Denmark) Mikkel Mac (Denmark) Mikkel Jensen	Ferrari 4.5 L V8	D	115
22	LMGTE	99	(United Kingdom) Aston Martin Racing	(United Kingdom) Andrew Howard (United Kingdom) Alex MacDowall (United Kingdom) Darren Turner	Aston Martin Vantage GTE	D	115
22	LMGTE	99	(United Kingdom) Aston Martin Racing	(United Kingdom) Andrew Howard (United Kingdom) Alex MacDowall (United Kingdom) Darren Turner	Aston Martin 4.5 L V8	D	115
23	LMGTE	56	(Austria) AT Racing	(Belarus) Alexander Talkanitsa Jr. (Belarus) Alexander Talkanitsa Sr. (Italy) Alessandro Pier Guidi	Ferrari 458 Italia GT2	D	115
23	LMGTE	56	(Austria) AT Racing	(Belarus) Alexander Talkanitsa Jr. (Belarus) Alexander Talkanitsa Sr. (Italy) Alessandro Pier Guidi	Ferrari 4.5 L V8	D	115
24	LMP3	16	(France) Panis Barthez Competition	(France) Eric Debard (France) Simon Gachet (France) Valentin Moineault	Ligier JS P3	MI	115
24	LMP3	16	(France) Panis Barthez Competition	(France) Eric Debard (France) Simon Gachet (France) Valentin Moineault	Nissan VK50 5.0 L V8	MI	115
25	LMP3	12	(United States) Eurointernational	(Italy) Andrea Dromedari (Netherlands) Rik Breukers	Ligier JS P3	MI	115
25	LMP3	12	(United States) Eurointernational	(Italy) Andrea Dromedari (Netherlands) Rik Breukers	Nissan VK50 5.0 L V8	MI	115
26	LMP3	7	(Italy) Villorba Corse	(Italy) Roberto Lacorte (Italy) Giorgio Sernagiotto	Ligier JS P3	MI	115
26	LMP3	7	(Italy) Villorba Corse	(Italy) Roberto Lacorte (Italy) Giorgio Sernagiotto	Nissan VK50 5.0 L V8	MI	115
27	LMGTE	55	(Italy) AF Corse	(United Kingdom) Duncan Cameron (Republic of Ireland) Matt Griffin (United Kingdom) Aaron Scott	Ferrari 458 Italia GT2	D	115
27	LMGTE	55	(Italy) AF Corse	(United Kingdom) Duncan Cameron (Republic of Ireland) Matt Griffin (United Kingdom) Aaron Scott	Ferrari 4.5 L V8	D	115
28	LMGTE	77	(Germany) Proton Competition	(United States) Mike Hedlund (Germany) Wolf Henzler (Germany) Marco Seefried	Porsche 911 RSR	D	115
28	LMGTE	77	(Germany) Proton Competition	(United States) Mike Hedlund (Germany) Wolf Henzler (Germany) Marco Seefried	Porsche 4.0 L Flat-6	D	115
29	LMP3	3	(United States) United Autosports	(United Kingdom) Matthew Bell (United Kingdom) Wayne Boyd (United States) Mark Patterson	Ligier JS P3	MI	114
29	LMP3	3	(United States) United Autosports	(United Kingdom) Matthew Bell (United Kingdom) Wayne Boyd (United States) Mark Patterson	Nissan VK50 5.0 L V8	MI	114
30	LMP3	4	(France) OAK Racing	(France) Erik Maris (France) Jean-Marc Merlin	Ligier JS P3	MI	113
30	LMP3	4	(France) OAK Racing	(France) Erik Maris (France) Jean-Marc Merlin	Nissan VK50 5.0 L V8	MI	113
31	LMP3	20	(France) Duqueine Engineering	(France) Eric Clement (France) Maxime Pialat (Switzerland) Antonin Borga	Ligier JS P3	MI	112
31	LMP3	20	(France) Duqueine Engineering	(France) Eric Clement (France) Maxime Pialat (Switzerland) Antonin Borga	Nissan VK50 5.0 L V8	MI	112
32	LMP3	5	(Spain) By Speed Factory	(United Kingdom) Tom Jackson (Monaco) Alain Costa (United Kingdom) John Hartshorne	Ligier JS P3	MI	111
32	LMP3	5	(Spain) By Speed Factory	(United Kingdom) Tom Jackson (Monaco) Alain Costa (United Kingdom) John Hartshorne	Nissan VK50 5.0 L V8	MI	111
33	LMP3	24	(France) OAK Racing	(France) Jacques Nicolet (France) Pierre Nicolet	Ligier JS P3	MI	105
33	LMP3	24	(France) OAK Racing	(France) Jacques Nicolet (France) Pierre Nicolet	Nissan VK50 5.0 L V8	MI	105
DNF	LMP3	10	(France) Graff	(United States) John Falb (Venezuela) Enzo Potolicchio (United States) Sean Rayhall	Ligier JS P3	MI	115
DNF	LMP3	10	(France) Graff	(United States) John Falb (Venezuela) Enzo Potolicchio (United States) Sean Rayhall	Nissan VK50 5.0 L V8	MI	115
DNF	LMGTE	51	(Italy) AF Corse	(Portugal) Rui Águas (Italy) Marco Cioci (Italy) Piergiuseppe Perazzini	Ferrari 458 Italia GT2	D	74
DNF	LMGTE	51	(Italy) AF Corse	(Portugal) Rui Águas (Italy) Marco Cioci (Italy) Piergiuseppe Perazzini	Ferrari 4.5 L V8	D	74
DNF	LMP3	11	(United States) Eurointernational	(Italy) Giorgio Mondini (Italy) Marco Jacoboni (Italy) Andrea Roda	Ligier JS P3	MI	66
DNF	LMP3	11	(United States) Eurointernational	(Italy) Giorgio Mondini (Italy) Marco Jacoboni (Italy) Andrea Roda	Nissan VK50 5.0 L V8	MI	66
DNF	LMP3	8	(Switzerland) Race Performance	(Belgium) Bert Longin (Switzerland) Giorgio Maggi (Switzerland) Marcello Marateotto	Ligier JS P3	MI	50
DNF	LMP3	8	(Switzerland) Race Performance	(Belgium) Bert Longin (Switzerland) Giorgio Maggi (Switzerland) Marcello Marateotto	Nissan VK50 5.0 L V8	MI	50
DNF	LMP3	15	(United Kingdom) RLR MSport	(Denmark) Morten Dons (United Kingdom) Ross Warburton (United Kingdom) Anthony Wells	Ligier JS P3	MI	46
DNF	LMP3	15	(United Kingdom) RLR MSport	(Denmark) Morten Dons (United Kingdom) Ross Warburton (United Kingdom) Anthony Wells	Nissan VK50 5.0 L V8	MI	46
DNF	LMP3	18	(France) M.Racing - YMR	(France) Alexandre Cougnaud (France) Yann Ehrlacher (France) Thomas Laurent	Ligier JS P3	MI	36
DNF	LMP3	18	(France) M.Racing - YMR	(France) Alexandre Cougnaud (France) Yann Ehrlacher (France) Thomas Laurent	Nissan VK50 5.0 L V8	MI	36
DNF	LMGTE	88	(Germany) Proton Competition	(Germany) Christian Ried (Germany) David Jahn (Italy) Gianluca Roda	Porsche 911 RSR	D	9
DNF	LMGTE	88	(Germany) Proton Competition	(Germany) Christian Ried (Germany) David Jahn (Italy) Gianluca Roda	Porsche 4.0 L Flat-6	D	9

European Le Mans Series
Previous race: Red Bull Ring	2016 season	Next race: Spa
