= 2016 4 Hours of Spa-Francorchamps =

Layout of Circuit de Spa-Francorchamps

The 2016 4 Hours of Spa-Francorchamps was an endurance motor race held at Circuit de Spa-Francorchamps in Stavelot, Belgium on 24–25 September 2016. It was the fifth round of the 2016 European Le Mans Series.

== Race ==
=== Race result ===
Class winners in bold.

Pos	Class	No.	Team	Drivers	Chassis	Tyre	Laps
Pos	Class	No.	Team	Drivers	Engine	Tyre	Laps
1	**LMP2**	**21**	**(United States) DragonSpeed**	**(United Kingdom) Ben Hanley** **(Sweden) Henrik Hedman** **(France) Nicolas Lapierre**	**Oreca 05**	D	**96**
1	**LMP2**	**21**	**(United States) DragonSpeed**	**(United Kingdom) Ben Hanley** **(Sweden) Henrik Hedman** **(France) Nicolas Lapierre**	**Nissan VK45DE 4.5 L V8**	D	**96**
2	LMP2	47	(Belgium) Team WRT	(United Kingdom) Will Stevens (Belgium) Dries Vanthoor (Belgium) Laurens Vanthoor	Ligier JS P2	D	96
2	LMP2	47	(Belgium) Team WRT	(United Kingdom) Will Stevens (Belgium) Dries Vanthoor (Belgium) Laurens Vanthoor	Judd HK 3.6 L V8	D	96
3	LMP2	46	(France) Thiriet by TDS Racing	(Switzerland) Mathias Beche (France) Pierre Thiriet (Japan) Ryō Hirakawa	Oreca 05	D	96
3	LMP2	46	(France) Thiriet by TDS Racing	(Switzerland) Mathias Beche (France) Pierre Thiriet (Japan) Ryō Hirakawa	Nissan VK45DE 4.5 L V8	D	96
4	LMP2	41	(United Kingdom) Greaves Motorsport	(France) Julien Canal (Mexico) Memo Rojas (France) Nathanaël Berthon	Ligier JS P2	D	96
4	LMP2	41	(United Kingdom) Greaves Motorsport	(France) Julien Canal (Mexico) Memo Rojas (France) Nathanaël Berthon	Nissan VK45DE 4.5 L V8	D	96
5	LMP2	38	(Russia) G-Drive Racing	(United Kingdom) Simon Dolan (Netherlands) Giedo van der Garde (United Kingdom) Harry Tincknell	Gibson 015S	D	96
5	LMP2	38	(Russia) G-Drive Racing	(United Kingdom) Simon Dolan (Netherlands) Giedo van der Garde (United Kingdom) Harry Tincknell	Nissan VK45DE 4.5 L V8	D	96
6	LMP2	32	(Russia) SMP Racing	(Monaco) Stefano Coletti (Germany) Andreas Wirth (Russia) Vitaly Petrov	BR Engineering BR01	D	95
6	LMP2	32	(Russia) SMP Racing	(Monaco) Stefano Coletti (Germany) Andreas Wirth (Russia) Vitaly Petrov	Nissan VK45DE 4.5 L V8	D	95
7	LMP2	23	(France) Panis Barthez Competition	(France) Fabien Barthez (France) Timothé Buret (France) Paul-Loup Chatin	Ligier JS P2	MI	95
7	LMP2	23	(France) Panis Barthez Competition	(France) Fabien Barthez (France) Timothé Buret (France) Paul-Loup Chatin	Nissan VK45DE 4.5 L V8	MI	95
8	LMP2	28	(France) IDEC Sport Racing	(France) Dimitri Enjalbert (France) Patrice Lafargue (France) Paul Lafargue	Ligier JS P2	MI	95
8	LMP2	28	(France) IDEC Sport Racing	(France) Dimitri Enjalbert (France) Patrice Lafargue (France) Paul Lafargue	Judd HK 3.6 L V8	MI	95
9	LMP2	25	(Portugal) Algarve Pro Racing	(United Kingdom) Michael Munemann (Switzerland) Jonathan Hirschi (France) Andrea Pizzitola	Ligier JS P2	D	94
9	LMP2	25	(Portugal) Algarve Pro Racing	(United Kingdom) Michael Munemann (Switzerland) Jonathan Hirschi (France) Andrea Pizzitola	Nissan VK45DE 4.5 L V8	D	94
10	**LMP3**	**9**	**(France) Graff**	**(France) Paul Petit** **(France) Enzo Guibbert** **(France) Eric Trouillet**	**Ligier JS P3**	MI	**92**
10	**LMP3**	**9**	**(France) Graff**	**(France) Paul Petit** **(France) Enzo Guibbert** **(France) Eric Trouillet**	**Nissan VK50 5.0 L V8**	MI	**92**
11	LMP3	2	(United States) United Autosports	(United Kingdom) Alex Brundle (United Kingdom) Christian England (United States) Mike Guasch	Ligier JS P3	MI	92
11	LMP3	2	(United States) United Autosports	(United Kingdom) Alex Brundle (United Kingdom) Christian England (United States) Mike Guasch	Nissan VK50 5.0 L V8	MI	92
12	LMP3	3	(United States) United Autosports	(United Kingdom) Matthew Bell (United Kingdom) Wayne Boyd (United States) Mark Patterson	Ligier JS P3	MI	92
12	LMP3	3	(United States) United Autosports	(United Kingdom) Matthew Bell (United Kingdom) Wayne Boyd (United States) Mark Patterson	Nissan VK50 5.0 L V8	MI	92
13	LMP3	17	(France) Ultimate	(France) François Hériau (France) Jean-Baptiste Lahaye (France) Matthieu Lahaye	Ligier JS P3	MI	92
13	LMP3	17	(France) Ultimate	(France) François Hériau (France) Jean-Baptiste Lahaye (France) Matthieu Lahaye	Nissan VK50 5.0 L V8	MI	92
14	LMP3	6	(United Kingdom) 360 Racing	(United Kingdom) Ross Kaiser (United Kingdom) James Swift (United Kingdom) Terrence Woodward	Ligier JS P3	MI	92
14	LMP3	6	(United Kingdom) 360 Racing	(United Kingdom) Ross Kaiser (United Kingdom) James Swift (United Kingdom) Terrence Woodward	Nissan VK50 5.0 L V8	MI	92
15	LMP3	13	(Poland) Inter Europol Competition	(Germany) Jens Petersen (Poland) Jakub Śmiechowski	Ligier JS P3	MI	92
15	LMP3	13	(Poland) Inter Europol Competition	(Germany) Jens Petersen (Poland) Jakub Śmiechowski	Nissan VK50 5.0 L V8	MI	92
16	LMP3	10	(France) Graff	(United States) John Falb (Venezuela) Enzo Potolicchio (United States) Sean Rayhall	Ligier JS P3	MI	92
16	LMP3	10	(France) Graff	(United States) John Falb (Venezuela) Enzo Potolicchio (United States) Sean Rayhall	Nissan VK50 5.0 L V8	MI	92
17	LMP3	15	(United Kingdom) RLR MSport	(Denmark) Morten Dons (United Kingdom) Alasdair McCaig (United Kingdom) Anthony Wells	Ligier JS P3	MI	91
17	LMP3	15	(United Kingdom) RLR MSport	(Denmark) Morten Dons (United Kingdom) Alasdair McCaig (United Kingdom) Anthony Wells	Nissan VK50 5.0 L V8	MI	91
18	LMP3	7	(Italy) Villorba Corse	(Italy) Roberto Lacorte (Italy) Giorgio Sernagiotto	Ligier JS P3	MI	91
18	LMP3	7	(Italy) Villorba Corse	(Italy) Roberto Lacorte (Italy) Giorgio Sernagiotto	Nissan VK50 5.0 L V8	MI	91
19	LMP3	20	(France) Duqueine Engineering	(France) Eric Clement (France) Maxime Pialat (Switzerland) Antonin Borga	Ligier JS P3	MI	91
19	LMP3	20	(France) Duqueine Engineering	(France) Eric Clement (France) Maxime Pialat (Switzerland) Antonin Borga	Nissan VK50 5.0 L V8	MI	91
20	LMP3	16	(France) Panis Barthez Competition	(France) Eric Debard (France) Simon Gachet (France) Valentin Moineault	Ligier JS P3	MI	91
20	LMP3	16	(France) Panis Barthez Competition	(France) Eric Debard (France) Simon Gachet (France) Valentin Moineault	Nissan VK50 5.0 L V8	MI	91
21	**LMGTE**	**66**	**(United Kingdom) JMW Motorsport**	**(Italy) Andrea Bertolini** **(United Kingdom) Robert Smith** **(United Kingdom) Rory Butcher**	**Ferrari 458 Italia GT2**	D	**91**
21	**LMGTE**	**66**	**(United Kingdom) JMW Motorsport**	**(Italy) Andrea Bertolini** **(United Kingdom) Robert Smith** **(United Kingdom) Rory Butcher**	**Ferrari 4.5 L V8**	D	**91**
22	LMGTE	88	(Germany) Proton Competition	(Germany) Christian Ried (Italy) Matteo Cairoli (Italy) Gianluca Roda	Porsche 911 RSR	D	91
22	LMGTE	88	(Germany) Proton Competition	(Germany) Christian Ried (Italy) Matteo Cairoli (Italy) Gianluca Roda	Porsche 4.0 L Flat-6	D	91
23	LMGTE	55	(Italy) AF Corse	(United Kingdom) Duncan Cameron (Republic of Ireland) Matt Griffin (United Kingdom) Aaron Scott	Ferrari 458 Italia GT2	D	90
23	LMGTE	55	(Italy) AF Corse	(United Kingdom) Duncan Cameron (Republic of Ireland) Matt Griffin (United Kingdom) Aaron Scott	Ferrari 4.5 L V8	D	90
24	LMGTE	77	(Germany) Proton Competition	(United States) Mike Hedlund (Germany) Wolf Henzler (Germany) Marco Seefried	Porsche 911 RSR	D	90
24	LMGTE	77	(Germany) Proton Competition	(United States) Mike Hedlund (Germany) Wolf Henzler (Germany) Marco Seefried	Porsche 4.0 L Flat-6	D	90
25	LMP3	26	(United Kingdom) Tockwith Motorsports	(United Kingdom) Phil Hanson (United Kingdom) Nigel Moore	Ligier JS P3	MI	90
25	LMP3	26	(United Kingdom) Tockwith Motorsports	(United Kingdom) Phil Hanson (United Kingdom) Nigel Moore	Nissan VK50 5.0 L V8	MI	90
26	LMP3	24	(France) OAK Racing	(France) Jacques Nicolet (France) Pierre Nicolet	Ligier JS P3	MI	90
26	LMP3	24	(France) OAK Racing	(France) Jacques Nicolet (France) Pierre Nicolet	Nissan VK50 5.0 L V8	MI	90
27	LMGTE	99	(United Kingdom) Aston Martin Racing	(United Kingdom) Andrew Howard (United Kingdom) Alex MacDowall (United Kingdom) Darren Turner	Aston Martin Vantage GTE	D	89
27	LMGTE	99	(United Kingdom) Aston Martin Racing	(United Kingdom) Andrew Howard (United Kingdom) Alex MacDowall (United Kingdom) Darren Turner	Aston Martin 4.5 L V8	D	89
28	LMGTE	51	(Italy) AF Corse	(Portugal) Rui Águas (Italy) Marco Cioci (Italy) Piergiuseppe Perazzini	Ferrari 458 Italia GT2	D	89
28	LMGTE	51	(Italy) AF Corse	(Portugal) Rui Águas (Italy) Marco Cioci (Italy) Piergiuseppe Perazzini	Ferrari 4.5 L V8	D	89
29	LMGTE	60	(Denmark) Formula Racing	(Denmark) Johnny Laursen (Denmark) Mikkel Mac (Denmark) Christina Nielsen	Ferrari 458 Italia GT2	D	88
29	LMGTE	60	(Denmark) Formula Racing	(Denmark) Johnny Laursen (Denmark) Mikkel Mac (Denmark) Christina Nielsen	Ferrari 4.5 L V8	D	88
30	LMP2	40	(United States) Krohn Racing	(United States) Tracy Krohn (Sweden) Niclas Jönsson (France) Olivier Pla	Ligier JS P2	MI	87
30	LMP2	40	(United States) Krohn Racing	(United States) Tracy Krohn (Sweden) Niclas Jönsson (France) Olivier Pla	Nissan VK45DE 4.5 L V8	MI	87
31	LMP3	4	(France) OAK Racing	(France) Erik Maris (Portugal) Carlos Tavares	Ligier JS P3	MI	87
31	LMP3	4	(France) OAK Racing	(France) Erik Maris (Portugal) Carlos Tavares	Nissan VK50 5.0 L V8	MI	87
DNF	LMP3	18	(France) M.Racing - YMR	(France) Alexandre Cougnaud (France) Yann Ehrlacher (France) Thomas Laurent	Ligier JS P3	MI	69
DNF	LMP3	18	(France) M.Racing - YMR	(France) Alexandre Cougnaud (France) Yann Ehrlacher (France) Thomas Laurent	Nissan VK50 5.0 L V8	MI	69
DNF	LMP2	29	(Germany) Pegasus Racing	(France) Léo Roussel (France) Inès Taittinger (France) Rémy Striebig	Morgan LMP2	MI	45
DNF	LMP2	29	(Germany) Pegasus Racing	(France) Léo Roussel (France) Inès Taittinger (France) Rémy Striebig	Nissan VK45DE 4.5 L V8	MI	45
DNF	LMP2	48	(Republic of Ireland) Murphy Prototypes	(Republic of Ireland) Sean Doyle (United Kingdom) Gary Findlay (Brazil) Bruno Bonifacio	Oreca 03R	D	36
DNF	LMP2	48	(Republic of Ireland) Murphy Prototypes	(Republic of Ireland) Sean Doyle (United Kingdom) Gary Findlay (Brazil) Bruno Bonifacio	Nissan VK45DE 4.5 L V8	D	36
DNF	LMP3	19	(France) Duqueine Engineering	(France) David Hallyday (France) Dino Lunardi (Switzerland) David Droux	Ligier JS P3	MI	25
DNF	LMP3	19	(France) Duqueine Engineering	(France) David Hallyday (France) Dino Lunardi (Switzerland) David Droux	Nissan VK50 5.0 L V8	MI	25
DNF	LMGTE	56	(Austria) AT Racing	(Belarus) Alexander Talkanitsa, Jr. (Belarus) Alexander Talkanitsa, Sr. (Italy) Alessandro Pier Guidi	Ferrari 458 Italia GT2	D	19
DNF	LMGTE	56	(Austria) AT Racing	(Belarus) Alexander Talkanitsa, Jr. (Belarus) Alexander Talkanitsa, Sr. (Italy) Alessandro Pier Guidi	Ferrari 4.5 L V8	D	19
DNF	LMP3	8	(Switzerland) Race Performance	(Belgium) Bert Longin (Switzerland) Giorgio Maggi (Switzerland) Marcello Marateotto	Ligier JS P3	MI	17
DNF	LMP3	8	(Switzerland) Race Performance	(Belgium) Bert Longin (Switzerland) Giorgio Maggi (Switzerland) Marcello Marateotto	Nissan VK50 5.0 L V8	MI	17
DNF	LMP3	5	(Spain) By Speed Factory	(Republic of Ireland) Kevin O'Hara (Republic of Ireland) Daniel Polley (Denmark) Kim Rødkjær	Ligier JS P3	MI	6
DNF	LMP3	5	(Spain) By Speed Factory	(Republic of Ireland) Kevin O'Hara (Republic of Ireland) Daniel Polley (Denmark) Kim Rødkjær	Nissan VK50 5.0 L V8	MI	6
DNF	LMP2	33	(Philippines) Eurasia Motorsport	(France) Tristan Gommendy (Netherlands) Nick de Bruijn (China) Pu Jun Jin	Oreca 05	D	0
DNF	LMP2	33	(Philippines) Eurasia Motorsport	(France) Tristan Gommendy (Netherlands) Nick de Bruijn (China) Pu Jun Jin	Nissan VK45DE 4.5 L V8	D	0

European Le Mans Series
Previous race: Le Castellet	2016 season	Next race: Estoril
