= 2016 4 Hours of Red Bull Ring =

Layout of the Red Bull Ring

The 2016 4 Hours of Red Bull Ring was an endurance motor race held at the Red Bull Ring in Spielberg, Austria on 16–17 July 2016. It was the third round of the 2016 European Le Mans Series.

== Race ==
=== Race result ===
Class winners in bold.

Pos	Class	No.	Team	Drivers	Chassis	Tyre	Laps
Pos	Class	No.	Team	Drivers	Engine	Tyre	Laps
1	**LMP2**	**46**	**(France) Thiriet by TDS Racing**	**(Switzerland) Mathias Beche** **(France) Pierre Thiriet** **(Japan) Ryō Hirakawa**	**Oreca 05**	D	**160**
1	**LMP2**	**46**	**(France) Thiriet by TDS Racing**	**(Switzerland) Mathias Beche** **(France) Pierre Thiriet** **(Japan) Ryō Hirakawa**	**Nissan VK45DE 4.5 L V8**	D	**160**
2	LMP2	33	(Philippines) Eurasia Motorsport	(France) Tristan Gommendy (Netherlands) Nick de Bruijn (China) Pu Jun Jin	Oreca 05	D	160
2	LMP2	33	(Philippines) Eurasia Motorsport	(France) Tristan Gommendy (Netherlands) Nick de Bruijn (China) Pu Jun Jin	Nissan VK45DE 4.5 L V8	D	160
3	LMP2	38	(Russia) G-Drive Racing	(United Kingdom) Simon Dolan (Netherlands) Giedo van der Garde (United Kingdom) Harry Tincknell	Gibson 015S	D	160
3	LMP2	38	(Russia) G-Drive Racing	(United Kingdom) Simon Dolan (Netherlands) Giedo van der Garde (United Kingdom) Harry Tincknell	Nissan VK45DE 4.5 L V8	D	160
4	LMP2	32	(Russia) SMP Racing	(Monaco) Stefano Coletti (Germany) Andreas Wirth (Colombia) Julián Leal	BR Engineering BR01	D	159
4	LMP2	32	(Russia) SMP Racing	(Monaco) Stefano Coletti (Germany) Andreas Wirth (Colombia) Julián Leal	Nissan VK45DE 4.5 L V8	D	159
5	LMP2	25	(Portugal) Algarve Pro Racing	(United Kingdom) Michael Munemann (Switzerland) Jonathan Hirschi (France) Andrea Pizzitola	Ligier JS P2	D	159
5	LMP2	25	(Portugal) Algarve Pro Racing	(United Kingdom) Michael Munemann (Switzerland) Jonathan Hirschi (France) Andrea Pizzitola	Nissan VK45DE 4.5 L V8	D	159
6	LMP2	41	(United Kingdom) Greaves Motorsport	(France) Julien Canal (Mexico) Memo Rojas (France) Nathanaël Berthon	Ligier JS P2	D	159
6	LMP2	41	(United Kingdom) Greaves Motorsport	(France) Julien Canal (Mexico) Memo Rojas (France) Nathanaël Berthon	Nissan VK45DE 4.5 L V8	D	159
7	LMP2	23	(France) Panis Barthez Competition	(France) Fabien Barthez (France) Timothé Buret (France) Paul-Loup Chatin	Ligier JS P2	MI	159
7	LMP2	23	(France) Panis Barthez Competition	(France) Fabien Barthez (France) Timothé Buret (France) Paul-Loup Chatin	Nissan VK45DE 4.5 L V8	MI	159
8	LMP2	48	(Republic of Ireland) Murphy Prototypes	(Republic of Ireland) Sean Doyle (Italy) Gugliemo Belotti (India) Karun Chandhok	Oreca 03R	D	156
8	LMP2	48	(Republic of Ireland) Murphy Prototypes	(Republic of Ireland) Sean Doyle (Italy) Gugliemo Belotti (India) Karun Chandhok	Nissan VK45DE 4.5 L V8	D	156
9	**LMP3**	**2**	**(United States) United Autosports**	**(United Kingdom) Alex Brundle** **(United Kingdom) Christian England** **(United States) Mike Guasch**	**Ligier JS P3**	MI	**151**
9	**LMP3**	**2**	**(United States) United Autosports**	**(United Kingdom) Alex Brundle** **(United Kingdom) Christian England** **(United States) Mike Guasch**	**Nissan VK50 5.0 L V8**	MI	**151**
10	LMP3	19	(France) Duqueine Engineering	(France) David Hallyday (France) Dino Lunardi (Switzerland) David Droux	Ligier JS P3	MI	151
10	LMP3	19	(France) Duqueine Engineering	(France) David Hallyday (France) Dino Lunardi (Switzerland) David Droux	Nissan VK50 5.0 L V8	MI	151
11	LMP3	6	(United Kingdom) 360 Racing	(United Kingdom) Ross Kaiser (United Kingdom) James Swift (United Kingdom) Terrence Woodward	Ligier JS P3	MI	151
11	LMP3	6	(United Kingdom) 360 Racing	(United Kingdom) Ross Kaiser (United Kingdom) James Swift (United Kingdom) Terrence Woodward	Nissan VK50 5.0 L V8	MI	151
12	LMP3	9	(France) Graff	(France) Paul Petit (United Kingdom) James Winslow (France) Eric Trouillet	Ligier JS P3	MI	151
12	LMP3	9	(France) Graff	(France) Paul Petit (United Kingdom) James Winslow (France) Eric Trouillet	Nissan VK50 5.0 L V8	MI	151
13	**LMGTE**	**66**	**(United Kingdom) JMW Motorsport**	**(Italy) Andrea Bertolini** **(United Kingdom) Robert Smith** **(United Kingdom) Rory Butcher**	**Ferrari 458 Italia GT2**	D	**151**
13	**LMGTE**	**66**	**(United Kingdom) JMW Motorsport**	**(Italy) Andrea Bertolini** **(United Kingdom) Robert Smith** **(United Kingdom) Rory Butcher**	**Ferrari 4.5 L V8**	D	**151**
14	LMP3	24	(France) OAK Racing	(France) Jacques Nicolet (France) Pierre Nicolet	Ligier JS P3	MI	150
14	LMP3	24	(France) OAK Racing	(France) Jacques Nicolet (France) Pierre Nicolet	Nissan VK50 5.0 L V8	MI	150
15	LMP3	8	(Switzerland) Race Performance	(Belgium) Bert Longin (Switzerland) Giorgio Maggi (Switzerland) Marcello Marateotto	Ligier JS P3	MI	150
15	LMP3	8	(Switzerland) Race Performance	(Belgium) Bert Longin (Switzerland) Giorgio Maggi (Switzerland) Marcello Marateotto	Nissan VK50 5.0 L V8	MI	150
16	LMP3	10	(France) Graff	(United States) John Falb (Venezuela) Enzo Potolicchio (United States) Sean Rayhall	Ligier JS P3	MI	150
16	LMP3	10	(France) Graff	(United States) John Falb (Venezuela) Enzo Potolicchio (United States) Sean Rayhall	Nissan VK50 5.0 L V8	MI	150
17	LMGTE	51	(Italy) AF Corse	(Portugal) Rui Águas (Italy) Marco Cioci (Italy) Piergiuseppe Perazzini	Ferrari 458 Italia GT2	D	150
17	LMGTE	51	(Italy) AF Corse	(Portugal) Rui Águas (Italy) Marco Cioci (Italy) Piergiuseppe Perazzini	Ferrari 4.5 L V8	D	150
18	LMGTE	56	(Austria) AT Racing	(Belarus) Alexander Talkanitsa, Jr. (Belarus) Alexander Talkanitsa, Sr. (Italy) Alessandro Pier Guidi	Ferrari 458 Italia GT2	D	150
18	LMGTE	56	(Austria) AT Racing	(Belarus) Alexander Talkanitsa, Jr. (Belarus) Alexander Talkanitsa, Sr. (Italy) Alessandro Pier Guidi	Ferrari 4.5 L V8	D	150
19	LMP3	16	(France) Panis Barthez Competition	(France) Eric Debard (France) Simon Gachet (France) Valentin Moineault	Ligier JS P3	MI	150
19	LMP3	16	(France) Panis Barthez Competition	(France) Eric Debard (France) Simon Gachet (France) Valentin Moineault	Nissan VK50 5.0 L V8	MI	150
20	LMP3	12	(United States) Eurointernational	(Italy) Andrea Dromedari (Italy) Fabio Mancini (Russia) Roman Rusinov	Ligier JS P3	MI	150
20	LMP3	12	(United States) Eurointernational	(Italy) Andrea Dromedari (Italy) Fabio Mancini (Russia) Roman Rusinov	Nissan VK50 5.0 L V8	MI	150
21	LMGTE	99	(United Kingdom) Aston Martin Racing	(United Kingdom) Andrew Howard (United Kingdom) Alex MacDowall (United Kingdom) Darren Turner	Aston Martin Vantage GTE	D	150
21	LMGTE	99	(United Kingdom) Aston Martin Racing	(United Kingdom) Andrew Howard (United Kingdom) Alex MacDowall (United Kingdom) Darren Turner	Aston Martin 4.5 L V8	D	150
22	LMGTE	88	(Germany) Proton Competition	(Germany) Christian Ried (Italy) Matteo Cairoli (Italy) Gianluca Roda	Porsche 911 RSR	D	150
22	LMGTE	88	(Germany) Proton Competition	(Germany) Christian Ried (Italy) Matteo Cairoli (Italy) Gianluca Roda	Porsche 4.0 L Flat-6	D	150
23	LMGTE	77	(Germany) Proton Competition	(United States) Mike Hedlund (Germany) Wolf Henzler (Germany) Marco Seefried	Porsche 911 RSR	D	149
23	LMGTE	77	(Germany) Proton Competition	(United States) Mike Hedlund (Germany) Wolf Henzler (Germany) Marco Seefried	Porsche 4.0 L Flat-6	D	149
24	LMGTE	60	(Denmark) Formula Racing	(Denmark) Johnny Laursen (Denmark) Mikkel Mac (Denmark) Christina Nielsen	Ferrari 458 Italia GT2	D	149
24	LMGTE	60	(Denmark) Formula Racing	(Denmark) Johnny Laursen (Denmark) Mikkel Mac (Denmark) Christina Nielsen	Ferrari 4.5 L V8	D	149
25	LMGTE	55	(Italy) AF Corse	(United Kingdom) Duncan Cameron (Republic of Ireland) Matt Griffin (United Kingdom) Aaron Scott	Ferrari 458 Italia GT2	D	149
25	LMGTE	55	(Italy) AF Corse	(United Kingdom) Duncan Cameron (Republic of Ireland) Matt Griffin (United Kingdom) Aaron Scott	Ferrari 4.5 L V8	D	149
26	LMP3	18	(France) M.Racing - YMR	(France) Alexandre Cougnaud (France) Yann Ehrlacher (France) Thomas Laurent	Ligier JS P3	MI	149
26	LMP3	18	(France) M.Racing - YMR	(France) Alexandre Cougnaud (France) Yann Ehrlacher (France) Thomas Laurent	Nissan VK50 5.0 L V8	MI	149
27	LMP3	20	(France) Duqueine Engineering	(France) Eric Clement (France) Maxime Pialat (Switzerland) Antonin Borga	Ligier JS P3	MI	148
27	LMP3	20	(France) Duqueine Engineering	(France) Eric Clement (France) Maxime Pialat (Switzerland) Antonin Borga	Nissan VK50 5.0 L V8	MI	148
28	LMP3	7	(Italy) Villorba Corse	(Italy) Roberto Lacorte (Italy) Giorgio Sernagiotto (Italy) Niccolò Schirò	Ligier JS P3	MI	148
28	LMP3	7	(Italy) Villorba Corse	(Italy) Roberto Lacorte (Italy) Giorgio Sernagiotto (Italy) Niccolò Schirò	Nissan VK50 5.0 L V8	MI	148
29	LMP3	5	(Spain) By Speed Factory	(United Kingdom) Tom Jackson (Monaco) Alain Costa	Ligier JS P3	MI	147
29	LMP3	5	(Spain) By Speed Factory	(United Kingdom) Tom Jackson (Monaco) Alain Costa	Nissan VK50 5.0 L V8	MI	147
30	LMP3	3	(United States) United Autosports	(United Kingdom) Matthew Bell (United Kingdom) Wayne Boyd (United States) Mark Patterson	Ligier JS P3	MI	146
30	LMP3	3	(United States) United Autosports	(United Kingdom) Matthew Bell (United Kingdom) Wayne Boyd (United States) Mark Patterson	Nissan VK50 5.0 L V8	MI	146
31	LMP3	15	(United Kingdom) RLR MSport	(Denmark) Morten Dons (United Kingdom) Ross Warburton (United Kingdom) John Hartshorne	Ligier JS P3	MI	146
31	LMP3	15	(United Kingdom) RLR MSport	(Denmark) Morten Dons (United Kingdom) Ross Warburton (United Kingdom) John Hartshorne	Nissan VK50 5.0 L V8	MI	146
32	LMP2	40	(United States) Krohn Racing	(United States) Tracy Krohn (Sweden) Niclas Jönsson (France) Olivier Pla	Ligier JS P2	MI	145
32	LMP2	40	(United States) Krohn Racing	(United States) Tracy Krohn (Sweden) Niclas Jönsson (France) Olivier Pla	Nissan VK45DE 4.5 L V8	MI	145
33	LMP3	4	(France) OAK Racing	(France) Erik Maris (France) Jean-Marc Merlin	Ligier JS P3	MI	140
33	LMP3	4	(France) OAK Racing	(France) Erik Maris (France) Jean-Marc Merlin	Nissan VK50 5.0 L V8	MI	140
DNF	LMP2	29	(Germany) Pegasus Racing	(France) Léo Roussel (France) Inès Taittinger (France) Rémy Striebig	Morgan LMP2	MI	123
DNF	LMP2	29	(Germany) Pegasus Racing	(France) Léo Roussel (France) Inès Taittinger (France) Rémy Striebig	Nissan VK45DE 4.5 L V8	MI	123
DNF	LMP3	11	(United States) Eurointernational	(Italy) Giorgio Mondini (Italy) Marco Jacoboni (Italy) Andrea Roda	Ligier JS P3	MI	105
DNF	LMP3	11	(United States) Eurointernational	(Italy) Giorgio Mondini (Italy) Marco Jacoboni (Italy) Andrea Roda	Nissan VK50 5.0 L V8	MI	105
DNF	LMP2	21	(United States) DragonSpeed	(United Kingdom) Ben Hanley (Sweden) Henrik Hedman (France) Nicolas Lapierre	Oreca 05	D	103
DNF	LMP2	21	(United States) DragonSpeed	(United Kingdom) Ben Hanley (Sweden) Henrik Hedman (France) Nicolas Lapierre	Nissan VK45DE 4.5 L V8	D	103
DNF	LMP3	17	(France) Ultimate	(France) François Hériau (France) Jean-Baptiste Lahaye (France) Matthieu Lahaye	Ligier JS P3	MI	87
DNF	LMP3	17	(France) Ultimate	(France) François Hériau (France) Jean-Baptiste Lahaye (France) Matthieu Lahaye	Nissan VK50 5.0 L V8	MI	87
DNF	LMP3	13	(Poland) Inter Europol Competition	(Germany) Jens Petersen (Poland) Jakub Śmiechowski	Ligier JS P3	MI	42
DNF	LMP3	13	(Poland) Inter Europol Competition	(Germany) Jens Petersen (Poland) Jakub Śmiechowski	Nissan VK50 5.0 L V8	MI	42

European Le Mans Series
Previous race: Imola	2016 season	Next race: Le Castellet
