= 4 Hours of Sepang =

Sports car endurance race in Sepang

Asian Le Mans Series
- Venue: Sepang International Circuit
- First race: 2013
- Last race: 2025
- Duration: 4 hours
- Previous names: 3 Hours of Sepang (2013-2016)
- Most wins (driver): (China) Ho-Pin Tung (China) David Cheng (France) Andrea Pizzitola (United Kingdom) Harrison Newey (Denmark) Malthe Jakobsen (Italy) Antonio Fuoco (Italy) Roberto Lacorte (France) Charles Milesi (2)
- Most wins (team): (Portugal) Algarve Pro Racing (4)
- Most wins (manufacturer): (France) Oreca (7)

Circuit information
- Length: 5.543 km (3.444 mi)
- Turns: 15

The 4 Hours of Sepang is an endurance race for sports cars held at Sepang International Circuit in Sepang, Selangor, Malaysia.

== History ==
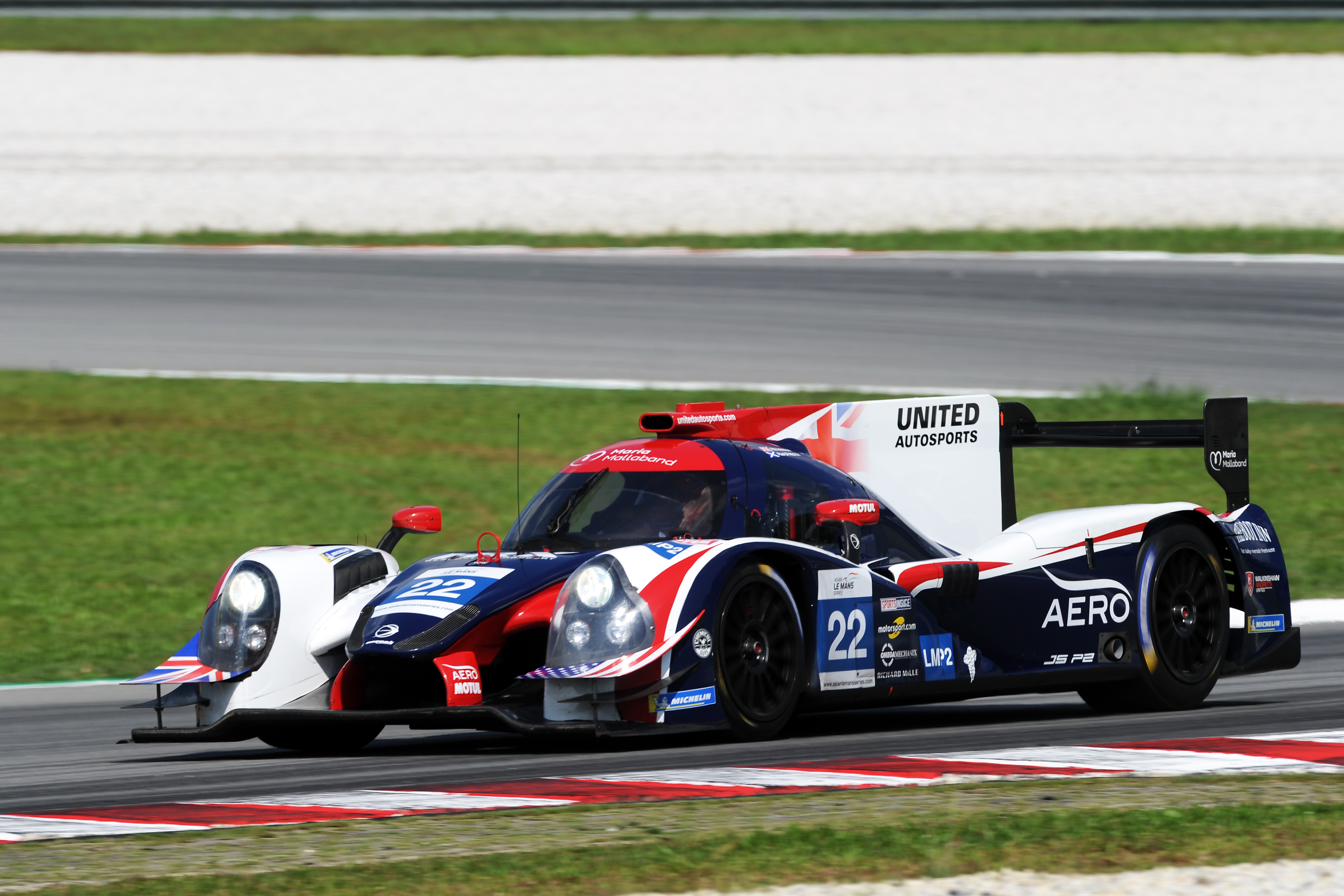
United Autosports' Ligier JS P2 at Sepang in 2019

The race joined the Asian Le Mans Series calendar in 2013. Initially as a 3-hour race (1000 km), Sepang replaced the Sentul International Circuit in Indonesia for the season finale. The inaugural event was won by Ho-Pin Tung and David Cheng for OAK Racing. This result guaranteed the team an entry for the 2014 24 Hours of Le Mans. Sepang returned as the finale for the 2014 season, again over 3 hours, and was won by Tung, Cheng and Yuan Bo, again for OAK Racing. Clearwater Racing won the GT class in their Ferrari 458.

For the 2015–16 season, Sepang would feature twice. The first 3-hour race was won by former Formula One driver Shinji Nakano and Nicolas Leutwiler in the Oreca 03. Meanwhile, a return for round four saw Sean Gelael and Antonio Giovinazzi take victory in the final 3 hour race.

From 2017, Sepang would host a four-hour race as opposed to the original three. The first extended race was won by APR in their Ligier JS P2, also winning the overall series title. In 2018 and 2019, Harrison Newey, son of Formula One designer Adrian Newey, took victory. The final pre-hiatus race at Sepang was won in 2020 by Carlin Motorsport.

The race did not take place in 2021 due to the COVID-19 pandemic, with the Asian Le Mans Series running events in Dubai and Abu Dhabi. This was repeated again in 2022, before Sepang returned in 2023. Sepang now features as two races, both 4 hours in duration, held over consecutive days. For 2023, the races were won by 99 Racing (their first victory in the series) and Crowdstrike Racing by APR. APR would win again in 2024, along with RD Limited.

== Results ==
Year	Overall winner(s)	Entrant	Car	Duration	Race title	Championship	Report	Ref
2013	(China) Ho-Pin Tung (China) David Cheng	(France) OAK Racing	Morgan LMP2	3:01:38	3 Hours of Sepang	Asian Le Mans Series	report	
2014	(China) David Cheng (China) Ho-Pin Tung (China) Yuan Bo	(France) OAK Racing Team Total	Morgan LMP2	2:44:40	3 Hours of Sepang	Asian Le Mans Series	report	
2015	(Switzerland) Nicolas Leutwiler (Japan) Shinji Nakano	(Switzerland) Race Performance	Oreca 03R	3:00:34	3 Hours of Sepang	Asian Le Mans Series	report	
2016	(Indonesia) Sean Gelael (Italy) Antonio Giovinazzi	(Indonesia) Jagonya Ayam with Eurasia	Oreca 03R	3:01:15	3 Hours of Sepang	Asian Le Mans Series	report	
2017	(France) Andrea Pizzitola (Australia) Aidan Read (Italy) Andrea Roda	(Portugal) Algarve Pro Racing	Ligier JS P2	4:00:37	4 Hours of Sepang	Asian Le Mans Series	report	
2018	(France) Thomas Laurent (United Kingdom) Harrison Newey (Monaco) Stéphane Richelmi	(China) Jackie Chan DC Racing X Jota	Oreca 05	4:02:06	4 Hours of Sepang	Asian Le Mans Series	report	
2019	(United Kingdom) Harrison Newey (France) Andrea Pizzitola (Philippines) Ate de Jong	(Portugal) Algarve Pro Racing	Ligier JS P2	4:03:17	4 Hours of Sepang	Asian Le Mans Series	report	
2020	(United Kingdom) Ben Barnicoat (United Kingdom) Jack Manchester (United Kingdom) Harry Tincknell	(United Kingdom) Thunderhead Carlin Racing	Dallara P217	4:03:21	4 Hours of Sepang	Asian Le Mans Series	report	
2023 (Race 1)	(Oman) Ahmad Al Harthy; Nikita Mazepin (Switzerland) Louis Delétraz	(Jordan) 99 Racing	Oreca 07	3:43:26 (Note: The race was red flagged with ten minutes remaining due to heavy rain.)	4 Hours of Sepang	Asian Le Mans Series	report	
2023 (Race 2)	(United States) George Kurtz (United States) Colin Braun (Denmark) Malthe Jakobsen	(Portugal) CrowdStrike Racing by APR	Oreca 07	4:00:38	4 Hours of Sepang	Asian Le Mans Series	report	
2024 (Race 1)	(United States) Fred Poordad (France) Tristan Vautier (Australia) James Allen	(France) RD Limited	Oreca 07	4:01:12	4 Hours of Sepang	Asian Le Mans Series	report	
2024 (Race 2)	(Denmark) Michael Jensen (Denmark) Malthe Jakobsen (Italy) Valerio Rinicella	(Portugal) Algarve Pro Racing	Oreca 07	3:02:57 (Note: The race was red flagged with 50 minutes remaining due to heavy rain.)	4 Hours of Sepang	Asian Le Mans Series	report	
2025 (Race 1)	(Italy) Antonio Fuoco (Italy) Roberto Lacorte (France) Charles Milesi	(Italy) Cetilar Racing	Oreca 07	4:00:34.716	4 Hours of Sepang	Asian Le Mans Series	report	
2025 (Race 2)	(Italy) Antonio Fuoco (Italy) Roberto Lacorte (France) Charles Milesi	(Italy) Cetilar Racing	Oreca 07	3:41:18.101	4 Hours of Sepang	Asian Le Mans Series	report	

=== Records ===
==== Wins by constructor ====
Rank	Constructor	Wins	Years
1	(France) Oreca	9	2015–2016, 2018, 2023 (Race 1)–2025 (Race 2)
2	(United Kingdom) Morgan	2	2013–2014
2	(France) Ligier	2	2017, 2019
4	(Italy) Dallara	1	2020

==== Wins by engine manufacturer ====
Rank	Constructor	Wins	Years
1	(United Kingdom) Gibson	7	2020–2025 (Race 2)
2	(United Kingdom) Judd	4	2013–2015, 2019
3	(Japan) Nissan	3	2016–2018

==== Drivers with multiple wins ====
Rank	Driver	Wins	Years
1	(China) Ho-Pin Tung	2	2013–2014
1	(China) David Cheng	2	2013–2014
1	(France) Andrea Pizzitola	2	2017, 2019
1	(United Kingdom) Harrison Newey	2	2018–2019
1	(Denmark) Malthe Jakobsen	2	2023 (Race 2)–2024 (Race 2)
1	(Italy) Antonio Fuoco	2	2025 (Race 1)–2025 (Race 2)
1	(Italy) Roberto Lacorte	2	2025 (Race 1)–2025 (Race 2)
1	(France) Charles Milesi	2	2025 (Race 1)–2025 (Race 2)
