= 2019 4 Hours of Buriram =

The Track map of the Buriram International Circuit

The 2019 4 Hours of Buriram was the third round of the 2018-19 Asian Le Mans Series season. It took place on January 12, 2019, at Buriram International Circuit in Buriram, Thailand.

== Qualifying results ==
Pole positions in each class are indicated in bold.

Pos.	Class	No.	Entry	Chassis	Time
1	**LMP2**	**24**	**(Portugal) Algarve Pro Racing**	**Ligier JS P2-Judd**	**1:25.571**
2	LMP2	22	(United States) United Autosports	Ligier JS P2-Nissan	1:25.956
3	LMP2	4	(Slovakia) ARC Bratislava	Ligier JS P2-Nissan	1:26.111
4	LMP2	23	(United States) United Autosports	Ligier JS P2-Nissan	1:26.796
5	LMP2	25	(Portugal) Algarve Pro Racing	Ligier JS P2-Judd	1:26.854
6	LMP2	35	(France) Panis Barthez Competition	Ligier JS P2-Judd	1:27.115
7	**LMP3**	**2**	**(United States) United Autosports**	**Ligier JS P3**	**1:29.508**
8	LMP3	65	(Malaysia) Viper Niza Racing	Ligier JS P3	1:29.606
9	LMP3	13	(Poland) Inter Europol Competition	Ligier JS P3	1:29.905
10	LMP3	79	(United Kingdom) Ecurie Ecosse/Nielsen	Ligier JS P3	1:29.988
11	LMP3	3	(United States) United Autosports	Ligier JS P3	1:30.120
12	LMP3	36	(Philippines) Eurasia Motorsport	Ligier JS P3	1:30.441
13	**GT**	**51**	**(Switzerland) Spirit of Race**	**Ferrari 488 GT3**	**1:32.617**
14	GT	11	(Japan) CarGuy Racing	Ferrari 488 GT3	1:32.660
15	LMP3	50	(Japan) R24	Ligier JS P3	1:32.805
16	GT	88	(China) Audi Sport Customer Racing Asia by TSRT	Audi R8 LMS	1:33.178
17	GT	66	(China) Audi Sport Customer Racing Asia by TSRT	Audi R8 LMS	1:33.631
18	GT	5	(United Kingdom) Red River Sport by TF Sport	Aston Martin V12 Vantage GT3	1:35.123
DNS	LMP3	7	(United Kingdom) Ecurie Ecosse/Nielsen	Ligier JS P3	—

== Race results ==
Class winners in bold.

Pos.	Class	No.	Entry	Drivers	Chassis	Laps
Pos.	Class	No.	Entry	Drivers	Engine	Laps
1	**LMP2**	**22**	**(United States) United Autosports**	**(United Kingdom) Phil Hanson** **(United Kingdom) Paul di Resta**	**Ligier JS P2**	**158**
1	**LMP2**	**22**	**(United States) United Autosports**	**(United Kingdom) Phil Hanson** **(United Kingdom) Paul di Resta**	**Nissan VK45DE 4.5 L V8**	**158**
2	LMP2	24	(Portugal) Algarve Pro Racing	(United Kingdom) Harrison Newey (France) Andrea Pizzitola (Philippines) Ate de Jong	Ligier JS P2	157
2	LMP2	24	(Portugal) Algarve Pro Racing	(United Kingdom) Harrison Newey (France) Andrea Pizzitola (Philippines) Ate de Jong	Judd HK 3.6 L V8	157
3	LMP2	35	(France) Panis Barthez Competition	(France) François Heriau (France) Matthieu Lahaye (France) Jean-Baptiste Lahaye	Ligier JS P2	157
3	LMP2	35	(France) Panis Barthez Competition	(France) François Heriau (France) Matthieu Lahaye (France) Jean-Baptiste Lahaye	Judd HK 3.6 L V8	157
4	LMP2	4	(Slovakia) ARC Bratislava	(United Kingdom) Darren Burke (Slovakia) Miroslav Konôpka (China) Kang Ling	Ligier JS P2	155
4	LMP2	4	(Slovakia) ARC Bratislava	(United Kingdom) Darren Burke (Slovakia) Miroslav Konôpka (China) Kang Ling	Nissan VK45DE 4.5 L V8	155
5	LMP2	25	(Portugal) Algarve Pro Racing	(Denmark) Anders Fjordbach (United States) Chris McMurry (United States) Mark Patterson	Ligier JS P2	155
5	LMP2	25	(Portugal) Algarve Pro Racing	(Denmark) Anders Fjordbach (United States) Chris McMurry (United States) Mark Patterson	Judd HK 3.6 L V8	155
6	LMP2	23	(United States) United Autosports	(United States) Patrick Byrne (United States) Guy Cosmo (Turkey) Salih Yoluç	Ligier JS P2	153
6	LMP2	23	(United States) United Autosports	(United States) Patrick Byrne (United States) Guy Cosmo (Turkey) Salih Yoluç	Nissan VK45DE 4.5 L V8	153
7	**LMP3**	**2**	**(United States) United Autosports**	**(United Kingdom) Wayne Boyd** **(United Kingdom) Chris Buncombe** **(Canada) Garett Grist**	**Ligier JS P3**	**151**
7	**LMP3**	**2**	**(United States) United Autosports**	**(United Kingdom) Wayne Boyd** **(United Kingdom) Chris Buncombe** **(Canada) Garett Grist**	**Nissan VK50VE 5.0 L V8**	**151**
8	LMP3	13	(Poland) Inter Europol Competition	(Poland) Jakub Śmiechowski (Germany) Martin Hippe	Ligier JS P3	150
8	LMP3	13	(Poland) Inter Europol Competition	(Poland) Jakub Śmiechowski (Germany) Martin Hippe	Nissan VK50VE 5.0 L V8	150
9	LMP3	79	(United Kingdom) Ecurie Ecosse/Nielsen	(United Kingdom) Colin Noble (United Kingdom) Anthony Wells	Ligier JS P3	149
9	LMP3	79	(United Kingdom) Ecurie Ecosse/Nielsen	(United Kingdom) Colin Noble (United Kingdom) Anthony Wells	Nissan VK50VE 5.0 L V8	149
10	LMP3	7	(United Kingdom) Ecurie Ecosse/Nielsen	(United Kingdom) Nick Adcock (Denmark) Christian Stubbe Olsen	Ligier JS P3	149
10	LMP3	7	(United Kingdom) Ecurie Ecosse/Nielsen	(United Kingdom) Nick Adcock (Denmark) Christian Stubbe Olsen	Nissan VK50VE 5.0 L V8	149
11	LMP3	3	(United States) United Autosports	(United Kingdom) Matthew Bell (United States) Jim McGuire (Netherlands) Kay van Berlo	Ligier JS P3	149
11	LMP3	3	(United States) United Autosports	(United Kingdom) Matthew Bell (United States) Jim McGuire (Netherlands) Kay van Berlo	Nissan VK50VE 5.0 L V8	149
12	LMP3	36	(Philippines) Eurasia Motorsport	(Japan) Nobuya Yamanaka (Australia) Aidan Read	Ligier JS P3	148
12	LMP3	36	(Philippines) Eurasia Motorsport	(Japan) Nobuya Yamanaka (Australia) Aidan Read	Nissan VK50VE 5.0 L V8	148
13	LMP3	50	(Japan) R24	(Netherlands) Stéphane Kox (Japan) Marie Iwaoka	Ligier JS P3	147
13	LMP3	50	(Japan) R24	(Netherlands) Stéphane Kox (Japan) Marie Iwaoka	Nissan VK50VE 5.0 L V8	147
14	LMP3	65	(Malaysia) Viper Niza Racing	(Malaysia) Douglas Khoo (United Kingdom) Nigel Moore	Ligier JS P3	146
14	LMP3	65	(Malaysia) Viper Niza Racing	(Malaysia) Douglas Khoo (United Kingdom) Nigel Moore	Nissan VK50VE 5.0 L V8	146
15	**GT**	**11**	**(Japan) CarGuy Racing**	**(United Kingdom) James Calado** **(Japan) Kei Cozzolino** **(Japan) Takeshi Kimura**	**Ferrari 488 GT3**	**146**
15	**GT**	**11**	**(Japan) CarGuy Racing**	**(United Kingdom) James Calado** **(Japan) Kei Cozzolino** **(Japan) Takeshi Kimura**	**Ferrari F154CB 3.9 L Turbo V8**	**146**
16	GT	88	(China) Audi Sport Customer Racing Asia by TSRT	(Hong Kong) Alex Au (China) Chen Weian (France) Jean-Karl Vernay	Audi R8 LMS	146
16	GT	88	(China) Audi Sport Customer Racing Asia by TSRT	(Hong Kong) Alex Au (China) Chen Weian (France) Jean-Karl Vernay	Audi DAR 5.2 L V10	146
17	GT	51	(Switzerland) Spirit of Race	(Puerto Rico) Francesco Piovanetti (Brazil) Oswaldo Negri Jr. (Italy) Alessandro Pier Guidi	Ferrari 488 GT3	145
17	GT	51	(Switzerland) Spirit of Race	(Puerto Rico) Francesco Piovanetti (Brazil) Oswaldo Negri Jr. (Italy) Alessandro Pier Guidi	Ferrari F154CB 3.9 L Turbo V8	145
18	GT	66	(China) Audi Sport Customer Racing Asia by TSRT	(Macau) Lo Kai Fung (Italy) Max Wiser (China) Zhang Yaqi	Audi R8 LMS	143
18	GT	66	(China) Audi Sport Customer Racing Asia by TSRT	(Macau) Lo Kai Fung (Italy) Max Wiser (China) Zhang Yaqi	Audi DAR 5.2 L V10	143
DNF	GT	5	(United Kingdom) Red River Sport by TF Sport	(United Kingdom) Johnny Mowle (United Kingdom) Bonamy Grimes (United Kingdom) Ivor Dunbar	Aston Martin V12 Vantage GT3	53
DNF	GT	5	(United Kingdom) Red River Sport by TF Sport	(United Kingdom) Johnny Mowle (United Kingdom) Bonamy Grimes (United Kingdom) Ivor Dunbar	Aston Martin AM28 6.0 L V12	53
