= 2018 4 Hours of Fuji =

The Track map of the Fuji Speedway

The 2018 4 Hours of Fuji was the second round of the 2018-19 Asian Le Mans Series season. It took place on December 9, 2018, at Fuji Speedway in Oyama, Shizuoka, Japan.

== Qualifying ==
=== Qualifying results ===
Pole positions in each class are indicated in bold.

Pos.	Class	No.	Entry	Chassis	Time
1	**LMP2**	**22**	**(United States) United Autosports**	**Ligier JS P2-Nissan**	**1:31.685**
2	LMP2	24	(Portugal) Algarve Pro Racing	Ligier JS P2-Judd	1:32.020
3	LMP2	8	(Switzerland) Spirit of Race	Ligier JS P2-Nissan	1:32.154
4	LMP2	23	(United States) United Autosports	Ligier JS P2-Nissan	1:32.885
5	LMP2	25	(Portugal) Algarve Pro Racing	Ligier JS P2-Judd	1:33.028
6	LMP2	4	(Slovakia) ARC Bratislava	Ligier JS P2-Nissan	1:33.098
7	LMP2	35	(France) Panis Barthez Competition	Ligier JS P2-Judd	1:34.751
8	**LMP3**	**65**	**(Malaysia) Viper Niza Racing**	**Ligier JS P3**	**1:35.467**
9	LMP3	2	(United States) United Autosports	Ligier JS P3	1:36.095
10	LMP3	3	(United States) United Autosports	Ligier JS P3	1:36.152
11	LMP3	36	(Philippines) Eurasia Motorsport	Ligier JS P3	1:36.551
12	LMP3	13	(Poland) Inter Europol Competition	Ligier JS P3	1:36.836
13	LMP3	7	(United Kingdom) Ecurie Ecosse/Nielsen	Ligier JS P3	1:36.838
14	**GT**	**11**	**(Japan) CarGuy Racing**	**Ferrari 488 GT3**	**1:37.852**
15	GT	51	(Switzerland) Spirit of Race	Ferrari 488 GT3	1:38.236
16	GT	88	(China) Audi Sport Customer Racing Asia by TSRT	Audi R8 LMS	1:38.774
17	GT	66	(China) Audi Sport Customer Racing Asia by TSRT	Audi R8 LMS	1:39.659
18	GT	5	(United Kingdom) Red River Sport by TF Sport	Aston Martin V12 Vantage GT3	1:45.266
19	LMP3	50	(Japan) R24	Ligier JS P3	1:52.964
20	LMP3	79	(United Kingdom) Ecurie Ecosse/Nielsen	Ligier JS P3	—

== Race ==
=== Race results ===
Class winners in bold.

Pos.	Class	No.	Entry	Drivers	Chassis	Laps
Pos.	Class	No.	Entry	Drivers	Engine	Laps
1	**LMP2**	**24**	**(Portugal) Algarve Pro Racing**	**(United Kingdom) Harrison Newey** **(France) Andrea Pizzitola**	**Ligier JS P2**	**140**
1	**LMP2**	**24**	**(Portugal) Algarve Pro Racing**	**(United Kingdom) Harrison Newey** **(France) Andrea Pizzitola**	**Judd HK 3.6 L V8**	**140**
2	LMP2	22	(United States) United Autosports	(United Kingdom) Phil Hanson (United Kingdom) Paul di Resta	Ligier JS P2	140
2	LMP2	22	(United States) United Autosports	(United Kingdom) Phil Hanson (United Kingdom) Paul di Resta	Nissan VK45DE 4.5 L V8	140
3	LMP2	4	(Slovakia) ARC Bratislava	(United Kingdom) Darren Burke (Slovakia) Miroslav Konôpka (China) Kang Ling	Ligier JS P2	138
3	LMP2	4	(Slovakia) ARC Bratislava	(United Kingdom) Darren Burke (Slovakia) Miroslav Konôpka (China) Kang Ling	Nissan VK45DE 4.5 L V8	138
4	LMP2	35	(France) Panis Barthez Competition	(France) François Heriau (France) Matthieu Lahaye	Ligier JS P2	138
4	LMP2	35	(France) Panis Barthez Competition	(France) François Heriau (France) Matthieu Lahaye	Judd HK 3.6 L V8	138
5	LMP2	23	(United States) United Autosports	(United States) Patrick Byrne (United States) Guy Cosmo (Turkey) Salih Yoluç	Ligier JS P2	138
5	LMP2	23	(United States) United Autosports	(United States) Patrick Byrne (United States) Guy Cosmo (Turkey) Salih Yoluç	Nissan VK45DE 4.5 L V8	138
6	LMP2	8	(Switzerland) Spirit of Race	(Brazil) Pipo Derani (France) Côme Ledogar (Sweden) Alexander West	Ligier JS P2	137
6	LMP2	8	(Switzerland) Spirit of Race	(Brazil) Pipo Derani (France) Côme Ledogar (Sweden) Alexander West	Nissan VK45DE 4.5 L V8	137
7	**LMP3**	**3**	**(United States) United Autosports**	**(United Kingdom) Matthew Bell** **(United Kingdom) Christian England** **(Netherlands) Kay van Berlo**	**Ligier JS P3**	**135**
7	**LMP3**	**3**	**(United States) United Autosports**	**(United Kingdom) Matthew Bell** **(United Kingdom) Christian England** **(Netherlands) Kay van Berlo**	**Nissan VK50VE 5.0 L V8**	**135**
8	LMP3	13	(Poland) Inter Europol Competition	(Poland) Jakub Śmiechowski (Germany) Martin Hippe	Ligier JS P3	134
8	LMP3	13	(Poland) Inter Europol Competition	(Poland) Jakub Śmiechowski (Germany) Martin Hippe	Nissan VK50VE 5.0 L V8	134
9	LMP2	25	(Portugal) Algarve Pro Racing	(Denmark) Anders Fjordbach (United States) Chris McMurry (United States) Mark Patterson	Ligier JS P2	134
9	LMP2	25	(Portugal) Algarve Pro Racing	(Denmark) Anders Fjordbach (United States) Chris McMurry (United States) Mark Patterson	Judd HK 3.6 L V8	134
10	LMP3	79	(United Kingdom) Ecurie Ecosse/Nielsen	(United Kingdom) Colin Noble (United Kingdom) Anthony Wells	Ligier JS P3	133
10	LMP3	79	(United Kingdom) Ecurie Ecosse/Nielsen	(United Kingdom) Colin Noble (United Kingdom) Anthony Wells	Nissan VK50VE 5.0 L V8	133
11	LMP3	7	(United Kingdom) Ecurie Ecosse/Nielsen	(United Kingdom) Nick Adcock (Denmark) Christian Stubbe Olsen	Ligier JS P3	133
11	LMP3	7	(United Kingdom) Ecurie Ecosse/Nielsen	(United Kingdom) Nick Adcock (Denmark) Christian Stubbe Olsen	Nissan VK50VE 5.0 L V8	133
12	**GT**	**11**	**(Japan) CarGuy Racing**	**(United Kingdom) James Calado** **(Japan) Kei Cozzolino** **(Japan) Takeshi Kimura**	**Ferrari 488 GT3**	**132**
12	**GT**	**11**	**(Japan) CarGuy Racing**	**(United Kingdom) James Calado** **(Japan) Kei Cozzolino** **(Japan) Takeshi Kimura**	**Ferrari F154CB 3.9 L Turbo V8**	**132**
13	LMP3	2	(United States) United Autosports	(United Kingdom) Wayne Boyd (United Kingdom) Chris Buncombe (Canada) Garett Grist	Ligier JS P3	132
13	LMP3	2	(United States) United Autosports	(United Kingdom) Wayne Boyd (United Kingdom) Chris Buncombe (Canada) Garett Grist	Nissan VK50VE 5.0 L V8	132
14	LMP3	65	(Malaysia) Viper Niza Racing	(Malaysia) Douglas Khoo (United Kingdom) Nigel Moore	Ligier JS P3	132
14	LMP3	65	(Malaysia) Viper Niza Racing	(Malaysia) Douglas Khoo (United Kingdom) Nigel Moore	Nissan VK50VE 5.0 L V8	132
15	GT	51	(Switzerland) Spirit of Race	(Puerto Rico) Francesco Piovanetti (Brazil) Oswaldo Negri Jr. (Italy) Alessandro Pier Guidi	Ferrari 488 GT3	131
15	GT	51	(Switzerland) Spirit of Race	(Puerto Rico) Francesco Piovanetti (Brazil) Oswaldo Negri Jr. (Italy) Alessandro Pier Guidi	Ferrari F154CB 3.9 L Turbo V8	131
16	GT	66	(China) Audi Sport Customer Racing Asia by TSRT	(China) Xu Wei (Italy) Max Wiser (China) Zhang Yaqi	Audi R8 LMS	130
16	GT	66	(China) Audi Sport Customer Racing Asia by TSRT	(China) Xu Wei (Italy) Max Wiser (China) Zhang Yaqi	Audi DAR 5.2 L V10	130
17	GT	88	(China) Audi Sport Customer Racing Asia by TSRT	(Belgium) Dries Vanthoor (China) Chen Weian (China) Anthony Liu Xu	Audi R8 LMS	130
17	GT	88	(China) Audi Sport Customer Racing Asia by TSRT	(Belgium) Dries Vanthoor (China) Chen Weian (China) Anthony Liu Xu	Audi DAR 5.2 L V10	130
18	GT	5	(United Kingdom) Red River Sport by TF Sport	(United Kingdom) Johnny Mowle (United Kingdom) Bonamy Grimes (United Kingdom) Ivor Dunbar	Aston Martin V12 Vantage GT3	129
18	GT	5	(United Kingdom) Red River Sport by TF Sport	(United Kingdom) Johnny Mowle (United Kingdom) Bonamy Grimes (United Kingdom) Ivor Dunbar	Aston Martin AM28 6.0 L V12	129
19	LMP3	50	(Japan) R24	(Japan) Anna Inotsume (Japan) Sayaka Katō (Japan) Marie Iwaoka	Ligier JS P3	116
19	LMP3	50	(Japan) R24	(Japan) Anna Inotsume (Japan) Sayaka Katō (Japan) Marie Iwaoka	Nissan VK50VE 5.0 L V8	116
DNF	LMP3	36	(Philippines) Eurasia Motorsport	(Japan) Nobuya Yamanaka (Australia) Aidan Read	Ligier JS P3	104
DNF	LMP3	36	(Philippines) Eurasia Motorsport	(Japan) Nobuya Yamanaka (Australia) Aidan Read	Nissan VK50VE 5.0 L V8	104
