= 2018 4 Hours of Shanghai =

Track map of the Shanghai International Circuit

The 2018 4 Hours of Shanghai was the first round of the 2018–19 Asian Le Mans Series. It took place on November 25, 2018, at Shanghai International Circuit in Shanghai, China.

== Qualifying results ==
Pole positions in each class are indicated in bold.

Pos.	Class	No.	Entry	Chassis	Time
1	**LMP2**	**8**	**(Switzerland) Spirit of Race**	**Ligier JS P2-Nissan**	**1:55.476**
2	LMP2	24	(Portugal) Algarve Pro Racing	Ligier JS P2-Judd	1:55.804
3	LMP2	22	(United States) United Autosports	Ligier JS P2-Nissan	1:56.230
4	LMP2	1	(China) Jackie Chan DC Racing X Jota Sport	Oreca 05-Nissan	1:56.444
5	LMP2	23	(United States) United Autosports	Ligier JS P2-Nissan	1:56.445
6	LMP2	35	(France) Panis Barthez Competition	Ligier JS P2-Judd	1:56.507
7	LMP2	25	(Portugal) Algarve Pro Racing	Ligier JS P2-Judd	1:57.146
8	LMP2	4	(Slovakia) ARC Bratislava	Ligier JS P2-Nissan	1:57.835
9	**LMP3**	**13**	**(Poland) Inter Europol Competition**	**Ligier JS P3**	**1:59.711**
10	LMP3	65	(Malaysia) Viper Niza Racing	Ligier JS P3	1:59.898
11	LMP3	2	(United States) United Autosports	Ligier JS P3	1:59.927
12	LMP3	3	(United States) United Autosports	Ligier JS P3	2:00.416
13	LMP3	36	(Philippines) Eurasia Motorsport	Ligier JS P3	2:00.631
14	LMP3	79	(United Kingdom) Ecurie Ecosse/Nielsen	Ligier JS P3	2:00.924
15	LMP3	7	(United Kingdom) Ecurie Ecosse/Nielsen	Ligier JS P3	2:01.216
16	LMP3	38	(China) Jackie Chan DC Racing X Jota Sport	Ligier JS P3	2:01.218
17	**GT**	**88**	**(China) Audi Sport Customer Racing Asia by TSRT**	**Audi R8 LMS**	**2:02.603**
18	GT	11	(Japan) CarGuy Racing	Ferrari 488 GT3	2:03.286
19	GT	51	(Switzerland) Spirit of Race	Ferrari 488 GT3	2:03.375
20	LMP3	50	(Japan) N24	Ligier JS P3	2:03.664
21	LMP3	37	(China) Jackie Chan DC Racing X Jota Sport	Ligier JS P3	2:03.736
22	GT	66	(China) TianShi Racing Team by Anstone Racing	Mercedes-AMG GT3	2:05.752
23	**GTC**	**16**	**(Hong Kong) Modena Motorsports**	**Porsche 991 GT3 Cup**	**2:08.401**
24	GTC	59	(Malaysia) EKS Motorsports	Porsche 991 GT3 Cup	2:09.039
25	GT	5	(United Kingdom) Red River Sport by TF Sport	Aston Martin V12 Vantage GT3	2:10.609
26	GTC	21	(Hong Kong) OpenRoad Racing	Porsche 991 GT3 Cup	2:10.780
27	GTC	12	(New Zealand) Earl Bamber Motorsport	Porsche 991 GT3 Cup	2:17.993

== Race results ==
Class winners in bold.

Pos.	Class	No.	Entry	Drivers	Chassis	Laps
Pos.	Class	No.	Entry	Drivers	Engine	Laps
1	**LMP2**	**8**	**(Switzerland) Spirit of Race**	**(Brazil) Pipo Derani** **(France) Côme Ledogar** **(Sweden) Alexander West**	**Ligier JS P2**	**115**
1	**LMP2**	**8**	**(Switzerland) Spirit of Race**	**(Brazil) Pipo Derani** **(France) Côme Ledogar** **(Sweden) Alexander West**	**Nissan VK45DE 4.5 L V8**	**115**
2	LMP2	22	(United States) United Autosports	(United Kingdom) Phil Hanson (United Kingdom) Paul di Resta	Ligier JS P2	115
2	LMP2	22	(United States) United Autosports	(United Kingdom) Phil Hanson (United Kingdom) Paul di Resta	Nissan VK45DE 4.5 L V8	115
3	LMP2	23	(United States) United Autosports	(United States) Patrick Byrne (United States) Guy Cosmo (Turkey) Salih Yoluç	Ligier JS P2	114
3	LMP2	23	(United States) United Autosports	(United States) Patrick Byrne (United States) Guy Cosmo (Turkey) Salih Yoluç	Nissan VK45DE 4.5 L V8	114
4	LMP2	4	(Slovakia) ARC Bratislava	(United Kingdom) Darren Burke (Slovakia) Miroslav Konôpka (China) Kang Ling	Ligier JS P2	114
4	LMP2	4	(Slovakia) ARC Bratislava	(United Kingdom) Darren Burke (Slovakia) Miroslav Konôpka (China) Kang Ling	Nissan VK45DE 4.5 L V8	114
5	LMP2	25	(Portugal) Algarve Pro Racing	(Denmark) Anders Fjordbach (United States) Chris McMurry (United States) Mark Patterson	Ligier JS P2	114
5	LMP2	25	(Portugal) Algarve Pro Racing	(Denmark) Anders Fjordbach (United States) Chris McMurry (United States) Mark Patterson	Judd HK 3.6 L V8	114
6	LMP2	35	(France) Panis Barthez Competition	(France) François Heriau (France) Matthieu Lahaye (France) Jean-Baptiste Lahaye	Ligier JS P2	113
6	LMP2	35	(France) Panis Barthez Competition	(France) François Heriau (France) Matthieu Lahaye (France) Jean-Baptiste Lahaye	Judd HK 3.6 L V8	113
7	**LMP3**	**13**	**(Poland) Inter Europol Competition**	**(Poland) Jakub Śmiechowski** **(Germany) Martin Hippe**	**Ligier JS P3**	**112**
7	**LMP3**	**13**	**(Poland) Inter Europol Competition**	**(Poland) Jakub Śmiechowski** **(Germany) Martin Hippe**	**Nissan VK50VE 5.0 L V8**	**112**
8	LMP3	2	(United States) United Autosports	(United Kingdom) Wayne Boyd (United Kingdom) Chris Buncombe (Canada) Garett Grist	Ligier JS P3	112
8	LMP3	2	(United States) United Autosports	(United Kingdom) Wayne Boyd (United Kingdom) Chris Buncombe (Canada) Garett Grist	Nissan VK50VE 5.0 L V8	112
9	LMP3	36	(Philippines) Eurasia Motorsport	(Japan) Nobuya Yamanaka (Australia) Aidan Read	Ligier JS P3	111
9	LMP3	36	(Philippines) Eurasia Motorsport	(Japan) Nobuya Yamanaka (Australia) Aidan Read	Nissan VK50VE 5.0 L V8	111
10	LMP3	79	(United Kingdom) Ecurie Ecosse/Nielsen	(United Kingdom) Colin Noble (United Kingdom) Anthony Wells	Ligier JS P3	111
10	LMP3	79	(United Kingdom) Ecurie Ecosse/Nielsen	(United Kingdom) Colin Noble (United Kingdom) Anthony Wells	Nissan VK50VE 5.0 L V8	111
11	LMP3	7	(United Kingdom) Ecurie Ecosse/Nielsen	(United Kingdom) Nick Adcock (Denmark) Christian Stubbe Olsen	Ligier JS P3	111
11	LMP3	7	(United Kingdom) Ecurie Ecosse/Nielsen	(United Kingdom) Nick Adcock (Denmark) Christian Stubbe Olsen	Nissan VK50VE 5.0 L V8	111
12	LMP3	3	(United States) United Autosports	(United Kingdom) Matthew Bell (United States) Jim McGuire (Netherlands) Kay van Berlo	Ligier JS P3	110
12	LMP3	3	(United States) United Autosports	(United Kingdom) Matthew Bell (United States) Jim McGuire (Netherlands) Kay van Berlo	Nissan VK50VE 5.0 L V8	110
13	**GT**	**11**	**(Japan) CarGuy Racing**	**(United Kingdom) James Calado** **(Japan) Kei Cozzolino** **(Japan) Takeshi Kimura**	**Ferrari 488 GT3**	**110**
13	**GT**	**11**	**(Japan) CarGuy Racing**	**(United Kingdom) James Calado** **(Japan) Kei Cozzolino** **(Japan) Takeshi Kimura**	**Ferrari F154CB 3.9 L Turbo V8**	**110**
14	GT	51	(Switzerland) Spirit of Race	(Puerto Rico) Francesco Piovanetti (Brazil) Oswaldo Negri Jr. (Italy) Alessandro Pier Guidi	Ferrari 488 GT3	109
14	GT	51	(Switzerland) Spirit of Race	(Puerto Rico) Francesco Piovanetti (Brazil) Oswaldo Negri Jr. (Italy) Alessandro Pier Guidi	Ferrari F154CB 3.9 L Turbo V8	109
15	GT	5	(United Kingdom) Red River Sport by TF Sport	(United Kingdom) Johnny Mowle (United Kingdom) Bonamy Grimes	Aston Martin V12 Vantage GT3	108
15	GT	5	(United Kingdom) Red River Sport by TF Sport	(United Kingdom) Johnny Mowle (United Kingdom) Bonamy Grimes	Aston Martin AM28 6.0 L V12	108
16	LMP3	50	(Japan) N24	(Belgium) Sarah Bovy (Netherlands) Stéphane Kox (Japan) Marie Iwaoka	Ligier JS P3	107
16	LMP3	50	(Japan) N24	(Belgium) Sarah Bovy (Netherlands) Stéphane Kox (Japan) Marie Iwaoka	Nissan VK50VE 5.0 L V8	107
17	LMP3	65	(Malaysia) Viper Niza Racing	(Malaysia) Douglas Khoo (United Kingdom) Nigel Moore	Ligier JS P3	106
17	LMP3	65	(Malaysia) Viper Niza Racing	(Malaysia) Douglas Khoo (United Kingdom) Nigel Moore	Nissan VK50VE 5.0 L V8	106
18	GT	66	(China) TianShi Racing Team by Anstone Racing	(China) Xu Wei (Italy) Max Wiser	Mercedes-AMG GT3	106
18	GT	66	(China) TianShi Racing Team by Anstone Racing	(China) Xu Wei (Italy) Max Wiser	Mercedes-Benz 6.2 L V8	106
19	**GTC**	**16**	**(Hong Kong) Modena Motorsports**	**(France) Philippe Descombes** **(Denmark) Benny Simonsen**	**Porsche 991 GT3 Cup**	**102**
19	**GTC**	**16**	**(Hong Kong) Modena Motorsports**	**(France) Philippe Descombes** **(Denmark) Benny Simonsen**	**Porsche 4.0 L Flat-6**	**102**
20	GTC	59	(Malaysia) EKS Motorsports	(China) Bao Jinlong (China) Lu Wenlong	Porsche 991 GT3 Cup	101
20	GTC	59	(Malaysia) EKS Motorsports	(China) Bao Jinlong (China) Lu Wenlong	Porsche 4.0 L Flat-6	101
21	LMP3	38	(China) Jackie Chan DC Racing X Jota Sport	(China) Wei Chaoyin (Switzerland) Hugo de Sadeleer	Ligier JS P3	98
21	LMP3	38	(China) Jackie Chan DC Racing X Jota Sport	(China) Wei Chaoyin (Switzerland) Hugo de Sadeleer	Nissan VK50VE 5.0 L V8	98
22	GTC	21	(Hong Kong) OpenRoad Racing	(Netherlands) Francis Tjia (Indonesia) Michael Soeryadjaya	Porsche 991 GT3 Cup	98
22	GTC	21	(Hong Kong) OpenRoad Racing	(Netherlands) Francis Tjia (Indonesia) Michael Soeryadjaya	Porsche 4.0 L Flat-6	98
DNF	GT	88	(China) Audi Sport Customer Racing Asia by TSRT	(Belgium) Dries Vanthoor (China) Chen Weian (China) Dennis Zhang	Audi R8 LMS	78
DNF	GT	88	(China) Audi Sport Customer Racing Asia by TSRT	(Belgium) Dries Vanthoor (China) Chen Weian (China) Dennis Zhang	Audi DAR 5.2 L V10	78
DNF	GTC	12	(New Zealand) Earl Bamber Motorsport	(Chinese Taipei) Jeffrey Chiang (New Zealand) Graeme Dowsett (New Zealand) Will Bamber	Porsche 991 GT3 Cup	61
DNF	GTC	12	(New Zealand) Earl Bamber Motorsport	(Chinese Taipei) Jeffrey Chiang (New Zealand) Graeme Dowsett (New Zealand) Will Bamber	Porsche 4.0 L Flat-6	61
DNF	LMP2	1	(China) Jackie Chan DC Racing X Jota Sport	(Malaysia) Jazeman Jaafar (Malaysia) Nabil Jeffri (Malaysia) Weiron Tan	Oreca 05	36
DNF	LMP2	1	(China) Jackie Chan DC Racing X Jota Sport	(Malaysia) Jazeman Jaafar (Malaysia) Nabil Jeffri (Malaysia) Weiron Tan	Nissan VK45DE 4.5 L V8	36
DNF	LMP2	24	(Portugal) Algarve Pro Racing	(Philippines) Ate de Jong (United Kingdom) Harrison Newey (France) Andrea Pizzitola	Ligier JS P2	9
DNF	LMP2	24	(Portugal) Algarve Pro Racing	(Philippines) Ate de Jong (United Kingdom) Harrison Newey (France) Andrea Pizzitola	Judd HK 3.6 L V8	9
DSQ	LMP3	37	(China) Jackie Chan DC Racing X Jota Sport	(Japan) Yoshiharu Mori (South Korea) Hwang Do-yun (Australia) Neale Muston	Ligier JS P3	—
DSQ	LMP3	37	(China) Jackie Chan DC Racing X Jota Sport	(Japan) Yoshiharu Mori (South Korea) Hwang Do-yun (Australia) Neale Muston	Nissan VK50VE 5.0 L V8	—
