= 2019 4 Hours of Sepang =

The layout of the Sepang International Circuit

The 2019 4 Hours of Sepang was the fourth and final round of the 2018-19 Asian Le Mans Series season. It took place on February 24, 2019, at Sepang International Circuit in Sepang, Selangor, Malaysia.

== Qualifying ==
=== Qualifying results ===
Pole positions in each class are indicated in bold.

Pos.	Class	No.	Entry	Chassis	Time
1	**LMP2**	**8**	**(Switzerland) Spirit of Race**	**Ligier JS P2-Nissan**	**1:55.167**
2	LMP2	22	(United States) United Autosports	Ligier JS P2-Nissan	1:55.370
3	LMP2	24	(Portugal) Algarve Pro Racing	Ligier JS P2-Judd	1:55.407
4	LMP2	35	(France) Panis Barthez Competition	Ligier JS P2-Judd	1:55.606
5	LMP2	25	(Portugal) Algarve Pro Racing	Ligier JS P2-Judd	1:55.840
6	LMP2	23	(United States) United Autosports	Ligier JS P2-Nissan	1:56.125
7	LMP2	4	(Slovakia) ARC Bratislava	Ligier JS P2-Nissan	1:56.699
8	**LMP3**	**2**	**(United States) United Autosports**	**Ligier JS P3**	**2:00.022**
9	LMP3	7	(United Kingdom) Ecurie Ecosse/Nielsen	Ligier JS P3	2:00.416
10	LMP3	36	(Philippines) Eurasia Motorsport	Ligier JS P3	2:00.771
11	LMP3	13	(Poland) Inter Europol Competition	Ligier JS P3	2:00.810
12	LMP3	3	(United States) United Autosports	Ligier JS P3	2:01.750
13	LMP3	44	(Slovakia) ARC Bratislava	Ginetta-Juno P3-15	2:02.179
14	LMP3	38	(China) Jackie Chan DC Racing	Ligier JS P3	2:02.213
15	LMP3	50	(Japan) R24	Ligier JS P3	2:02.223
16	**GT**	**88**	**(China) Audi Sport Customer Racing Asia by TSRT**	**Audi R8 LMS**	**2:03.306**
17	GT	11	(Japan) CarGuy Racing	Ferrari 488 GT3	2:03.513
18	GT	51	(Switzerland) Spirit of Race	Ferrari 488 GT3	2:03.650
19	GT	66	(China) Audi Sport Customer Racing Asia by TSRT	Audi R8 LMS	2:04.743
20	GT	5	(United Kingdom) Red River Sport by TF Sport	Aston Martin V12 Vantage GT3	—
21	LMP3	65	(Malaysia) Viper Niza Racing	Ligier JS P3	—
22	LMP3	79	(United Kingdom) Ecurie Ecosse/Nielsen	Ligier JS P3	—

== Race ==
=== Race results ===
Class winners in bold.

Pos.	Class	No.	Entry	Drivers	Chassis	Laps
Pos.	Class	No.	Entry	Drivers	Engine	Laps
1	**LMP2**	**24**	**(Portugal) Algarve Pro Racing**	**(United Kingdom) Harrison Newey** **(France) Andrea Pizzitola** **(Philippines) Ate de Jong**	**Ligier JS P2**	**118**
1	**LMP2**	**24**	**(Portugal) Algarve Pro Racing**	**(United Kingdom) Harrison Newey** **(France) Andrea Pizzitola** **(Philippines) Ate de Jong**	**Judd HK 3.6 L V8**	**118**
2	LMP2	22	(United States) United Autosports	(United Kingdom) Phil Hanson (United Kingdom) Paul di Resta	Ligier JS P2	118
2	LMP2	22	(United States) United Autosports	(United Kingdom) Phil Hanson (United Kingdom) Paul di Resta	Nissan VK45DE 4.5 L V8	118
3	LMP2	35	(France) Panis Barthez Competition	(France) François Heriau (France) Matthieu Lahaye (France) Jean-Baptiste Lahaye	Ligier JS P2	117
3	LMP2	35	(France) Panis Barthez Competition	(France) François Heriau (France) Matthieu Lahaye (France) Jean-Baptiste Lahaye	Judd HK 3.6 L V8	117
4	LMP2	4	(Slovakia) ARC Bratislava	(United Kingdom) Darren Burke (Slovakia) Miroslav Konôpka (China) Kang Ling	Ligier JS P2	116
4	LMP2	4	(Slovakia) ARC Bratislava	(United Kingdom) Darren Burke (Slovakia) Miroslav Konôpka (China) Kang Ling	Nissan VK45DE 4.5 L V8	116
5	**LMP3**	**13**	**(Poland) Inter Europol Competition**	**(Poland) Jakub Śmiechowski** **(Germany) Martin Hippe**	**Ligier JS P3**	**113**
5	**LMP3**	**13**	**(Poland) Inter Europol Competition**	**(Poland) Jakub Śmiechowski** **(Germany) Martin Hippe**	**Nissan VK50VE 5.0 L V8**	**113**
6	LMP3	7	(United Kingdom) Ecurie Ecosse/Nielsen	(United Kingdom) Nick Adcock (Denmark) Christian Stubbe Olsen	Ligier JS P3	113
6	LMP3	7	(United Kingdom) Ecurie Ecosse/Nielsen	(United Kingdom) Nick Adcock (Denmark) Christian Stubbe Olsen	Nissan VK50VE 5.0 L V8	113
7	LMP3	2	(United States) United Autosports	(United Kingdom) Wayne Boyd (United Kingdom) Chris Buncombe (Canada) Garett Grist	Ligier JS P3	112
7	LMP3	2	(United States) United Autosports	(United Kingdom) Wayne Boyd (United Kingdom) Chris Buncombe (Canada) Garett Grist	Nissan VK50VE 5.0 L V8	112
8	LMP3	79	(United Kingdom) Ecurie Ecosse/Nielsen	(United Kingdom) Colin Noble (United Kingdom) Anthony Wells	Ligier JS P3	112
8	LMP3	79	(United Kingdom) Ecurie Ecosse/Nielsen	(United Kingdom) Colin Noble (United Kingdom) Anthony Wells	Nissan VK50VE 5.0 L V8	112
9	LMP3	3	(United States) United Autosports	(United Kingdom) Matthew Bell (United States) Jim McGuire (Netherlands) Kay van Berlo	Ligier JS P3	112
9	LMP3	3	(United States) United Autosports	(United Kingdom) Matthew Bell (United States) Jim McGuire (Netherlands) Kay van Berlo	Nissan VK50VE 5.0 L V8	112
10	LMP3	36	(Philippines) Eurasia Motorsport	(Japan) Nobuya Yamanaka (Australia) Aidan Read	Ligier JS P3	112
10	LMP3	36	(Philippines) Eurasia Motorsport	(Japan) Nobuya Yamanaka (Australia) Aidan Read	Nissan VK50VE 5.0 L V8	112
11	**GT**	**11**	**(Japan) CarGuy Racing**	**(United Kingdom) James Calado** **(Japan) Kei Cozzolino** **(Japan) Takeshi Kimura**	**Ferrari 488 GT3**	**111**
11	**GT**	**11**	**(Japan) CarGuy Racing**	**(United Kingdom) James Calado** **(Japan) Kei Cozzolino** **(Japan) Takeshi Kimura**	**Ferrari F154CB 3.9 L Turbo V8**	**111**
12	LMP3	65	(Malaysia) Viper Niza Racing	(Malaysia) Douglas Khoo (United Kingdom) Nigel Moore	Ligier JS P3	110
12	LMP3	65	(Malaysia) Viper Niza Racing	(Malaysia) Douglas Khoo (United Kingdom) Nigel Moore	Nissan VK50VE 5.0 L V8	110
13	LMP3	50	(Japan) R24	(United Kingdom) Katherine Legge (Denmark) Michelle Gatting (France) Margot Laffite	Ligier JS P3	110
13	LMP3	50	(Japan) R24	(United Kingdom) Katherine Legge (Denmark) Michelle Gatting (France) Margot Laffite	Nissan VK50VE 5.0 L V8	110
14	GT	88	(China) Audi Sport Customer Racing Asia by TSRT	(Belgium) Dries Vanthoor (China) Chen Weian (China) Xu Wei	Audi R8 LMS	110
14	GT	88	(China) Audi Sport Customer Racing Asia by TSRT	(Belgium) Dries Vanthoor (China) Chen Weian (China) Xu Wei	Audi DAR 5.2 L V10	110
15	LMP3	44	(Slovakia) ARC Bratislava	(Australia) Neale Muston (United Kingdom) Michael Simpson	Ginetta-Juno P3-15	110
15	LMP3	44	(Slovakia) ARC Bratislava	(Australia) Neale Muston (United Kingdom) Michael Simpson	Nissan VK50VE 5.0 L V8	110
16	GT	51	(Switzerland) Spirit of Race	(Puerto Rico) Francesco Piovanetti (Brazil) Oswaldo Negri Jr. (Italy) Alessandro Pier Guidi	Ferrari 488 GT3	110
16	GT	51	(Switzerland) Spirit of Race	(Puerto Rico) Francesco Piovanetti (Brazil) Oswaldo Negri Jr. (Italy) Alessandro Pier Guidi	Ferrari F154CB 3.9 L Turbo V8	110
17	GT	5	(United Kingdom) Red River Sport by TF Sport	(United Kingdom) Johnny Mowle (United Kingdom) Ivor Dunbar	Aston Martin V12 Vantage GT3	106
17	GT	5	(United Kingdom) Red River Sport by TF Sport	(United Kingdom) Johnny Mowle (United Kingdom) Ivor Dunbar	Aston Martin AM28 6.0 L V12	106
18	LMP2	8	(Switzerland) Spirit of Race	(Brazil) Pipo Derani (France) Côme Ledogar (Sweden) Alexander West	Ligier JS P2	97
18	LMP2	8	(Switzerland) Spirit of Race	(Brazil) Pipo Derani (France) Côme Ledogar (Sweden) Alexander West	Nissan VK45DE 4.5 L V8	97
19	LMP3	38	(China) Jackie Chan DC Racing	(Australia) Jake Parsons (Australia) Jamie Winslow (South Korea) Rick Yoon	Ligier JS P3	88
19	LMP3	38	(China) Jackie Chan DC Racing	(Australia) Jake Parsons (Australia) Jamie Winslow (South Korea) Rick Yoon	Nissan VK50VE 5.0 L V8	88
DNF	LMP2	23	(United States) United Autosports	(United States) Patrick Byrne (United States) Guy Cosmo (Turkey) Salih Yoluç	Ligier JS P2	100
DNF	LMP2	23	(United States) United Autosports	(United States) Patrick Byrne (United States) Guy Cosmo (Turkey) Salih Yoluç	Nissan VK45DE 4.5 L V8	100
DNF	LMP2	25	(Portugal) Algarve Pro Racing	(Denmark) Anders Fjordbach (United States) Chris McMurry (United States) Mark Patterson	Ligier JS P2	94
DNF	LMP2	25	(Portugal) Algarve Pro Racing	(Denmark) Anders Fjordbach (United States) Chris McMurry (United States) Mark Patterson	Judd HK 3.6 L V8	94
DNF	GT	66	(China) Audi Sport Customer Racing Asia by TSRT	(China) Qi Peiwen (Italy) Max Wiser (China) Zhang Yaqi	Audi R8 LMS	64
DNF	GT	66	(China) Audi Sport Customer Racing Asia by TSRT	(China) Qi Peiwen (Italy) Max Wiser (China) Zhang Yaqi	Audi DAR 5.2 L V10	64
