= 2018–19 Asian Le Mans Series =

The 2018–19 Asian Le Mans Series was the seventh season of the Automobile Club de l'Ouest's Asian Le Mans Series. It is the fourth 24 Hours of Le Mans-based series created by the ACO, following the American Le Mans Series (since merged with the Rolex Sports Car Series to form the United SportsCar Championship), the European Le Mans Series and the FIA World Endurance Championship. The four-event season began at the Shanghai International Circuit on 25 November 2018 and ended at the Sepang International Circuit in Selangor on 24 February 2019.

== Calendar ==
The calendar for the 2018–2019 season was announced on 3 February 2018, featuring four FIA Grade 1 circuits. The series returned to the Shanghai International Circuit for the first time since the 2014 season, with the venue replacing the Zhuhai International Circuit as the opening round of the season.

Rnd	Race	Circuit	Location	Date
1	4 Hours of Shanghai	(China) Shanghai International Circuit	Shanghai, China	25 November 2018
2	4 Hours of Fuji	(Japan) Fuji Speedway	Oyama, Japan	9 December 2018
3	4 Hours of Buriram	(Thailand) Chang International Circuit	Buriram, Thailand	12 January 2019
4	4 Hours of Sepang	(Malaysia) Sepang International Circuit	Selangor, Malaysia	24 February 2019

== Entry list ==
=== LMP2 ===
Entrant/Team	Car	Engine	Class	No.	Drivers	Rounds
(China) Jackie Chan DC Racing X Jota Sport	Oreca 05	Nissan VK45DE 4.5 L V8	P2	1	(Malaysia) Jazeman Jaafar	1
(China) Jackie Chan DC Racing X Jota Sport	Oreca 05	Nissan VK45DE 4.5 L V8	P2	1	(Malaysia) Nabil Jeffri	1
(China) Jackie Chan DC Racing X Jota Sport	Oreca 05	Nissan VK45DE 4.5 L V8	P2	1	(Malaysia) Weiron Tan	1
(Slovakia) ARC Bratislava	Ligier JS P2	Nissan VK45DE 4.5 L V8	Am	4	(United Kingdom) Darren Burke	All
(Slovakia) ARC Bratislava	Ligier JS P2	Nissan VK45DE 4.5 L V8	Am	4	(Slovakia) Miroslav Konôpka	All
(Slovakia) ARC Bratislava	Ligier JS P2	Nissan VK45DE 4.5 L V8	Am	4	(China) Kang Ling	All
(Switzerland) Spirit of Race	Ligier JS P2	Nissan VK45DE 4.5 L V8	P2	8	(Brazil) Pipo Derani	1–2, 4
(Switzerland) Spirit of Race	Ligier JS P2	Nissan VK45DE 4.5 L V8	P2	8	(France) Côme Ledogar	1–2, 4
(Switzerland) Spirit of Race	Ligier JS P2	Nissan VK45DE 4.5 L V8	P2	8	(Sweden) Alexander West	1–2, 4
(United States) United Autosports	Ligier JS P2	Nissan VK45DE 4.5 L V8	P2	22	(United Kingdom) Phil Hanson	All
(United States) United Autosports	Ligier JS P2	Nissan VK45DE 4.5 L V8	P2	22	(United Kingdom) Paul di Resta	All
(United States) United Autosports	Ligier JS P2	Nissan VK45DE 4.5 L V8	Am	23	(United States) Patrick Byrne	All
(United States) United Autosports	Ligier JS P2	Nissan VK45DE 4.5 L V8	Am	23	(United States) Guy Cosmo	All
(United States) United Autosports	Ligier JS P2	Nissan VK45DE 4.5 L V8	Am	23	(Turkey) Salih Yoluç	All
(Portugal) Algarve Pro Racing	Ligier JS P2	Judd HK 3.6 L V8	P2	24	(Philippines) Ate de Jong	1, 3–4
(Portugal) Algarve Pro Racing	Ligier JS P2	Judd HK 3.6 L V8	P2	24	(United Kingdom) Harrison Newey	All
(Portugal) Algarve Pro Racing	Ligier JS P2	Judd HK 3.6 L V8	P2	24	(France) Andrea Pizzitola	All
(Portugal) Algarve Pro Racing	Ligier JS P2	Judd HK 3.6 L V8	Am	25	(Denmark) Anders Fjordbach	All
(Portugal) Algarve Pro Racing	Ligier JS P2	Judd HK 3.6 L V8	Am	25	(United States) Chris McMurry	All
(Portugal) Algarve Pro Racing	Ligier JS P2	Judd HK 3.6 L V8	Am	25	(United States) Mark Patterson	All
(France) Panis Barthez Competition	Ligier JS P2	Judd HK 3.6 L V8	P2	35	(France) François Hériau	All
(France) Panis Barthez Competition	Ligier JS P2	Judd HK 3.6 L V8	P2	35	(France) Matthieu Lahaye	All
(France) Panis Barthez Competition	Ligier JS P2	Judd HK 3.6 L V8	P2	35	(France) Jean-Baptiste Lahaye	1, 3–4

Icon	Class
P2	LMP2
Am	LMP2 Am

=== LMP3 ===
Entrant/Team	Car	Engine	Class	No.	Drivers	Rounds
(United States) United Autosports	Ligier JS P3	Nissan VK50VE 5.0 L V8	P3	2	(United Kingdom) Wayne Boyd	All
(United States) United Autosports	Ligier JS P3	Nissan VK50VE 5.0 L V8	P3	2	(United Kingdom) Chris Buncombe	All
(United States) United Autosports	Ligier JS P3	Nissan VK50VE 5.0 L V8	P3	2	(Canada) Garett Grist	All
(United States) United Autosports	Ligier JS P3	Nissan VK50VE 5.0 L V8	P3	3	(United Kingdom) Matthew Bell	All
(United States) United Autosports	Ligier JS P3	Nissan VK50VE 5.0 L V8	P3	3	(United States) Jim McGuire	1, 3–4
(United States) United Autosports	Ligier JS P3	Nissan VK50VE 5.0 L V8	P3	3	(Netherlands) Kay van Berlo	All
(United States) United Autosports	Ligier JS P3	Nissan VK50VE 5.0 L V8	P3	3	(United Kingdom) Christian England	2
(United Kingdom) Ecurie Ecosse/Nielsen	Ligier JS P3	Nissan VK50VE 5.0 L V8	P3	7	(United Kingdom) Nick Adcock	All
(United Kingdom) Ecurie Ecosse/Nielsen	Ligier JS P3	Nissan VK50VE 5.0 L V8	P3	7	(Denmark) Christian Stubbe Olsen	All
(United Kingdom) Ecurie Ecosse/Nielsen	Ligier JS P3	Nissan VK50VE 5.0 L V8	P3	79	(United Kingdom) Colin Noble	All
(United Kingdom) Ecurie Ecosse/Nielsen	Ligier JS P3	Nissan VK50VE 5.0 L V8	P3	79	(United Kingdom) Anthony Wells	All
(Poland) Inter Europol Competition	Ligier JS P3	Nissan VK50VE 5.0 L V8	P3	13	(Poland) Jakub Śmiechowski	All
(Poland) Inter Europol Competition	Ligier JS P3	Nissan VK50VE 5.0 L V8	P3	13	(Germany) Martin Hippe	All
(Philippines) Eurasia Motorsport	Ligier JS P3	Nissan VK50VE 5.0 L V8	P3	36	(Japan) Nobuya Yamanaka	All
(Philippines) Eurasia Motorsport	Ligier JS P3	Nissan VK50VE 5.0 L V8	P3	36	(Australia) Aidan Read	All
(China) Jackie Chan DC Racing X Jota Sport	Ligier JS P3	Nissan VK50VE 5.0 L V8	P3	37	(Japan) Yoshiharu Mori	1
(China) Jackie Chan DC Racing X Jota Sport	Ligier JS P3	Nissan VK50VE 5.0 L V8	P3	37	(South Korea) Hwang Do-yun	1
(China) Jackie Chan DC Racing X Jota Sport	Ligier JS P3	Nissan VK50VE 5.0 L V8	P3	37	(Australia) Neale Muston	1
(China) Jackie Chan DC Racing X Jota Sport	Ligier JS P3	Nissan VK50VE 5.0 L V8	P3	38	(China) Wei Chaoyin	1
(China) Jackie Chan DC Racing X Jota Sport	Ligier JS P3	Nissan VK50VE 5.0 L V8	P3	38	(Switzerland) Hugo de Sadeleer	1
(China) Jackie Chan DC Racing X Jota Sport	Ligier JS P3	Nissan VK50VE 5.0 L V8	P3	38	(Australia) Jake Parsons	4
(China) Jackie Chan DC Racing X Jota Sport	Ligier JS P3	Nissan VK50VE 5.0 L V8	P3	38	(Australia) Jamie Winslow	4
(China) Jackie Chan DC Racing X Jota Sport	Ligier JS P3	Nissan VK50VE 5.0 L V8	P3	38	(South Korea) Rick Yoon	4
(Slovakia) ARC Bratislava	Ginetta-Juno P3-15	Nissan VK50VE 5.0 L V8	P3	44	(Australia) Neale Muston	4
(Slovakia) ARC Bratislava	Ginetta-Juno P3-15	Nissan VK50VE 5.0 L V8	P3	44	(United Kingdom) Mike Simpson	4
(Japan) / N24 (Note: Car No. 50 entered as N24 at Rounds 1 and 2 and as R24 at Rounds 3 and 4); (Japan) / R24	Ligier JS P3	Nissan VK50VE 5.0 L V8	P3	50	(Belgium) Sarah Bovy	1
(Japan) / N24; (Japan) / R24	Ligier JS P3	Nissan VK50VE 5.0 L V8	P3	50	(Netherlands) Stéphane Kox	1, 3
(Japan) / N24; (Japan) / R24	Ligier JS P3	Nissan VK50VE 5.0 L V8	P3	50	(Japan) Marie Iwaoka	1–3
(Japan) / N24; (Japan) / R24	Ligier JS P3	Nissan VK50VE 5.0 L V8	P3	50	(Japan) Anna Inotsume	2
(Japan) / N24; (Japan) / R24	Ligier JS P3	Nissan VK50VE 5.0 L V8	P3	50	(Japan) Sayaka Katō	2
(Japan) / N24; (Japan) / R24	Ligier JS P3	Nissan VK50VE 5.0 L V8	P3	50	(United Kingdom) Katherine Legge	4
(Japan) / N24; (Japan) / R24	Ligier JS P3	Nissan VK50VE 5.0 L V8	P3	50	(Denmark) Michelle Gatting	4
(Japan) / N24; (Japan) / R24	Ligier JS P3	Nissan VK50VE 5.0 L V8	P3	50	(France) Margot Laffite	4
(Malaysia) Viper Niza Racing	Ligier JS P3	Nissan VK50VE 5.0 L V8	P3	65	(Malaysia) Douglas Khoo	All
(Malaysia) Viper Niza Racing	Ligier JS P3	Nissan VK50VE 5.0 L V8	P3	65	(United Kingdom) Nigel Moore	All

Icon	Class
P3	LMP3

=== GT ===
Entrant/Team	Car	Engine	Class	No.	Drivers	Rounds
(United Kingdom) Red River Sport by TF Sport	Aston Martin V12 Vantage GT3	Aston Martin AM28 6.0 L V12	GT Am	5	(United Kingdom) Johnny Mowlem	All
(United Kingdom) Red River Sport by TF Sport	Aston Martin V12 Vantage GT3	Aston Martin AM28 6.0 L V12	GT Am	5	(United Kingdom) Bonamy Grimes	1–3
(United Kingdom) Red River Sport by TF Sport	Aston Martin V12 Vantage GT3	Aston Martin AM28 6.0 L V12	GT Am	5	(United Kingdom) Ivor Dunbar	2–4
(Japan) CarGuy Racing	Ferrari 488 GT3	Ferrari F154CB 3.9 L Turbo V8	GT	11	(United Kingdom) James Calado	All
(Japan) CarGuy Racing	Ferrari 488 GT3	Ferrari F154CB 3.9 L Turbo V8	GT	11	(Italy) Kei Cozzolino	All
(Japan) CarGuy Racing	Ferrari 488 GT3	Ferrari F154CB 3.9 L Turbo V8	GT	11	(Japan) Takeshi Kimura	All
(New Zealand) Earl Bamber Motorsport	Porsche 991 GT3 Cup	Porsche 4.0 L Flat-6	GTC	12	(Chinese Taipei) Jeffrey Chiang	1
(New Zealand) Earl Bamber Motorsport	Porsche 991 GT3 Cup	Porsche 4.0 L Flat-6	GTC	12	(New Zealand) Graeme Dowsett	1
(New Zealand) Earl Bamber Motorsport	Porsche 991 GT3 Cup	Porsche 4.0 L Flat-6	GTC	12	(New Zealand) Will Bamber	1
(Hong Kong) Modena Motorsports	Porsche 991 GT3 Cup	Porsche 4.0 L Flat-6	GTC	16	(France) Philippe Descombes	1
(Hong Kong) Modena Motorsports	Porsche 991 GT3 Cup	Porsche 4.0 L Flat-6	GTC	16	(Denmark) Benny Simonsen	1
(Hong Kong) OpenRoad Racing	Porsche 991 GT3 Cup	Porsche 4.0 L Flat-6	GTC	21	(Netherlands) Francis Tjia	1
(Hong Kong) OpenRoad Racing	Porsche 991 GT3 Cup	Porsche 4.0 L Flat-6	GTC	21	(Indonesia) Michael Soeryadjaya	1
(Switzerland) Spirit of Race	Ferrari 488 GT3	Ferrari F154CB 3.9 L Turbo V8	GT	51	(Puerto Rico) Francesco Piovanetti	All
(Switzerland) Spirit of Race	Ferrari 488 GT3	Ferrari F154CB 3.9 L Turbo V8	GT	51	(Brazil) Oswaldo Negri Jr.	All
(Switzerland) Spirit of Race	Ferrari 488 GT3	Ferrari F154CB 3.9 L Turbo V8	GT	51	(Italy) Alessandro Pier Guidi	All
(Malaysia) EKS Motorsports	Porsche 991 GT3 Cup	Porsche 4.0 L Flat-6	GTC	59	(China) Bao Jinlong	1
(Malaysia) EKS Motorsports	Porsche 991 GT3 Cup	Porsche 4.0 L Flat-6	GTC	59	(China) Daniel Lu	1
(China) / TianShi Racing Team by Anstone Racing (Note: Car No. 66 entered as TianShi Racing Team by Anstone Racing with Mercedes-AMG GT3. Cars No. 66 and No. 88 entered as Audi Sport Customer Racing Asia by TSRT with 2 Audi R8 LMS.); (China) / Audi Sport Customer Racing Asia by TSRT	Mercedes-AMG GT3	Mercedes-AMG M159 6.2 L V8	GT Am	66	(China) Xu Wei	1
(China) / TianShi Racing Team by Anstone Racing; (China) / Audi Sport Customer Racing Asia by TSRT	Mercedes-AMG GT3	Mercedes-AMG M159 6.2 L V8	GT Am	66	(Italy) Max Wiser	1
(China) / TianShi Racing Team by Anstone Racing; (China) / Audi Sport Customer Racing Asia by TSRT	Audi R8 LMS 1 Audi R8 LMS Evo 4	Audi DAR 5.2 L V10	GT Am	66	(China) Xu Wei	2
(China) / TianShi Racing Team by Anstone Racing; (China) / Audi Sport Customer Racing Asia by TSRT	Audi R8 LMS 1 Audi R8 LMS Evo 4	Audi DAR 5.2 L V10	GT Am	66	(Italy) Max Wiser	2–4
(China) / TianShi Racing Team by Anstone Racing; (China) / Audi Sport Customer Racing Asia by TSRT	Audi R8 LMS 1 Audi R8 LMS Evo 4	Audi DAR 5.2 L V10	GT Am	66	(China) Zhang Yaqi	2–4
(China) / TianShi Racing Team by Anstone Racing; (China) / Audi Sport Customer Racing Asia by TSRT	Audi R8 LMS 1 Audi R8 LMS Evo 4	Audi DAR 5.2 L V10	GT Am	66	(Macau) Lo Kai Fung	3
(China) / TianShi Racing Team by Anstone Racing; (China) / Audi Sport Customer Racing Asia by TSRT	Audi R8 LMS 1 Audi R8 LMS Evo 4	Audi DAR 5.2 L V10	GT Am	66	(China) Qi Peiwen	4
(China) / TianShi Racing Team by Anstone Racing; (China) / Audi Sport Customer Racing Asia by TSRT	Audi R8 LMS 1 Audi R8 LMS Evo 4	Audi DAR 5.2 L V10	GT	88	(Belgium) Dries Vanthoor	1–2, 4
(China) / TianShi Racing Team by Anstone Racing; (China) / Audi Sport Customer Racing Asia by TSRT	Audi R8 LMS 1 Audi R8 LMS Evo 4	Audi DAR 5.2 L V10	GT	88	(China) David Chen	All
(China) / TianShi Racing Team by Anstone Racing; (China) / Audi Sport Customer Racing Asia by TSRT	Audi R8 LMS 1 Audi R8 LMS Evo 4	Audi DAR 5.2 L V10	GT	88	(China) Dennis Zhang	1
(China) / TianShi Racing Team by Anstone Racing; (China) / Audi Sport Customer Racing Asia by TSRT	Audi R8 LMS 1 Audi R8 LMS Evo 4	Audi DAR 5.2 L V10	GT	88	(China) Anthony Liu Xu	2
(China) / TianShi Racing Team by Anstone Racing; (China) / Audi Sport Customer Racing Asia by TSRT	Audi R8 LMS 1 Audi R8 LMS Evo 4	Audi DAR 5.2 L V10	GT	88	(Hong Kong) Alex Au	3
(China) / TianShi Racing Team by Anstone Racing; (China) / Audi Sport Customer Racing Asia by TSRT	Audi R8 LMS 1 Audi R8 LMS Evo 4	Audi DAR 5.2 L V10	GT	88	(France) Jean-Karl Vernay	3
(China) / TianShi Racing Team by Anstone Racing; (China) / Audi Sport Customer Racing Asia by TSRT	Audi R8 LMS 1 Audi R8 LMS Evo 4	Audi DAR 5.2 L V10	GT	88	(China) Xu Wei	4

Icon	Class
GT	GT3
GT Am	GT3 Am
GTC	GT Cup

== Results ==
Bold indicates overall winner.

Rnd.	Circuit	LMP2 Winning Team	LMP3 Winning Team	GT Winning Team	GT Cup Winning Team	Results
Rnd.	Circuit	LMP2 Winning Drivers	LMP3 Winning Drivers	GT Winning Drivers	GT Cup Winning Drivers	Results
1	(China) Shanghai	**(Switzerland) No. 8 Spirit of Race**	(Poland) No. 13 Inter Europol Competition	(Japan) No. 11 CarGuy Racing	(Hong Kong) No. 16 Modena Motorsports	Report
1	(China) Shanghai	**(Brazil) Pipo Derani** **(France) Côme Ledogar** **(Sweden) Alexander West**	(Germany) Martin Hippe (Poland) Jakub Śmiechowski	(United Kingdom) James Calado (Japan) Kei Cozzolino (Japan) Takeshi Kimura	(France) Philippe Descombes (Denmark) Benny Simonsen	Report
2	(Japan) Fuji	**(Portugal) No. 24 Algarve Pro Racing**	(United States) No. 3 United Autosports	(Japan) No. 11 CarGuy Racing	No Entrants	Report
2	(Japan) Fuji	**(United Kingdom) Harrison Newey** **(France) Andrea Pizzitola**	(United Kingdom) Matthew Bell (Netherlands) Kay van Berlo (United Kingdom) Christian England	(United Kingdom) James Calado (Japan) Kei Cozzolino (Japan) Takeshi Kimura	No Entrants	Report
3	(Thailand) Buriram	**(United States) No. 22 United Autosports**	(United States) No. 2 United Autosports	(Japan) No. 11 CarGuy Racing	No Entrants	Report
3	(Thailand) Buriram	**(United Kingdom) Phil Hanson** **(United Kingdom) Paul di Resta**	(United Kingdom) Wayne Boyd (United Kingdom) Chris Buncombe (Canada) Garett Grist	(United Kingdom) James Calado (Japan) Kei Cozzolino (Japan) Takeshi Kimura	No Entrants	Report
4	(Malaysia) Sepang	**(Portugal) No. 24 Algarve Pro Racing**	(Poland) No. 13 Inter Europol Competition	(Japan) No. 11 CarGuy Racing	No Entrants	Report
4	(Malaysia) Sepang	**(Netherlands) Ate de Jong** **(United Kingdom) Harrison Newey** **(France) Andrea Pizzitola**	(Germany) Martin Hippe (Poland) Jakub Śmiechowski	(United Kingdom) James Calado (Japan) Kei Cozzolino (Japan) Takeshi Kimura	No Entrants	Report

== Teams Championships ==
Points are awarded according to the following structure:

Position	**1st**	**2nd**	**3rd**	**4th**	**5th**	**6th**	**7th**	**8th**	**9th**	**10th**	**Other**	**Pole**
Points	25	18	15	12	10	8	6	4	2	1	0.5	1

=== LMP2 Teams Championship ===
Pos.	Team	Car	SHA (China)	FUJ (Japan)	CHA (Thailand)	SEP (Malaysia)	Points
1	(United States) #22 United Autosports	Ligier JS P2	2	**2**	1	2	80
2	(Portugal) #24 Algarve Pro Racing	Ligier JS P2	Ret	1	**2**	1	69
3	(Slovakia) #4 ARC Bratislava	Ligier JS P2	4	3	4	4	51
4	(France) #35 Panis Barthez Competition	Ligier JS P2	6	4	3	3	50
5	(Switzerland) #8 Spirit of Race	Ligier JS P2	**1**	6		**5**	45
6	(United States) #23 United Autosports	Ligier JS P2	3	5	6	Ret	33
7	(Portugal) #25 Algarve Pro Racing	Ligier JS P2	5	7	5	Ret	26
8	(China) #1 Jackie Chan DC Racing X Jota Sport	Oreca 05	Ret				0

Key
Colour	Result
Gold	Race winner
Silver	2nd place
Bronze	3rd place
Green	Points finish
Blue	Non-points finish
Blue	Non-classified finish (NC)
Purple	Did not finish (Ret)
Black	Disqualified (DSQ)
Black	Excluded (EX)
White	Did not start (DNS)
White	Race cancelled (C)
White	Withdrew (WD)
Blank	Did not participate

**Bold** – Pole

=== LMP2 Am Teams Championship ===
Pos.	Team	Car	SHA (China)	FUJ (Japan)	CHA (Thailand)	SEP (Malaysia)	Points
1	(Slovakia) #4 ARC Bratislava	Ligier JS P2	2	1	**1**	1	94
2	(United States) #23 United Autosports	Ligier JS P2	1	**2**	3	Ret	60
3	(Portugal) #25 Algarve Pro Racing	Ligier JS P2	3	3	2	**Ret**	49

Key
Colour	Result
Gold	Race winner
Silver	2nd place
Bronze	3rd place
Green	Points finish
Blue	Non-points finish
Blue	Non-classified finish (NC)
Purple	Did not finish (Ret)
Black	Disqualified (DSQ)
Black	Excluded (EX)
White	Did not start (DNS)
White	Race cancelled (C)
White	Withdrew (WD)
Blank	Did not participate

**Bold** – Pole

=== LMP3 Teams Championship ===
Pos.	Team	Car	SHA (China)	FUJ (Japan)	CHA (Thailand)	SEP (Malaysia)	Points
1	(Poland) #13 Inter Europol Competition	Ligier JS P3	**1**	2	2	1	87
2	(United States) #2 United Autosports	Ligier JS P3	2	5	**1**	**3**	70
3	(United Kingdom) #79 Ecurie Ecosse/Nielsen	Ligier JS P3	4	3	3	4	54
4	(United States) #3 United Autosports	Ligier JS P3	6	1	5	5	53
5	(United Kingdom) #7 Ecurie Ecosse/Nielsen	Ligier JS P3	5	4	4	2	52
6	(Philippines) #36 Eurasia Motorsport	Ligier JS P3	3	Ret	6	6	31
7	(Malaysia) #65 Viper Niza Racing	Ligier JS P3	8	**6**	8	7	23
8	(Japan) #50 R24	Ligier JS P3	7	7	7	8	22
9	(China) #38 Jackie Chan DC Racing X Jota Sport	Ligier JS P3	9			10	3
10	(Slovakia) #44 ARC Bratislava	Ginetta-Juno P3-15				9	2
11	(China) #37 Jackie Chan DC Racing X Jota Sport	Ligier JS P3	DSQ				0

Key
Colour	Result
Gold	Race winner
Silver	2nd place
Bronze	3rd place
Green	Points finish
Blue	Non-points finish
Blue	Non-classified finish (NC)
Purple	Did not finish (Ret)
Black	Disqualified (DSQ)
Black	Excluded (EX)
White	Did not start (DNS)
White	Race cancelled (C)
White	Withdrew (WD)
Blank	Did not participate

**Bold** – Pole

=== GT Teams Championship ===
Pos.	Team	Car	SHA (China)	FUJ (Japan)	CHA (Thailand)	SEP (Malaysia)	Points
1	(Japan) #11 CarGuy Racing	Ferrari 488 GT3	1	**1**	1	1	101
2	(Switzerland) #51 Spirit of Race	Ferrari 488 GT3	2	2	**3**	3	67
3	(China) #88 TianShi Racing Team	Audi R8 LMS; Audi R8 LMS Evo	**Ret**	4	2	**2**	50
4	(China) #66 TianShi Racing Team	Mercedes-AMG GT3; Audi R8 LMS; Audi R8 LMS Evo	4	3	4	Ret	39
5	(United Kingdom) #5 Red River Sport by TF Sport	Aston Martin V12 Vantage GT3	3	5	Ret	4	37

Key
Colour	Result
Gold	Race winner
Silver	2nd place
Bronze	3rd place
Green	Points finish
Blue	Non-points finish
Blue	Non-classified finish (NC)
Purple	Did not finish (Ret)
Black	Disqualified (DSQ)
Black	Excluded (EX)
White	Did not start (DNS)
White	Race cancelled (C)
White	Withdrew (WD)
Blank	Did not participate

**Bold** – Pole

=== GT Am Teams Championship ===
Pos.	Team	Car	SHA (China)	FUJ (Japan)	CHA (Thailand)	SEP (Malaysia)	Points
1	(China) #66 TianShi Racing Team	Mercedes-AMG GT3; Audi R8 LMS; Audi R8 LMS Evo		**1**	**1**	Ret	78
2	(United Kingdom) #5 Red River Sport by TF Sport	Aston Martin V12 Vantage GT3			Ret		0

Key
Colour	Result
Gold	Race winner
Silver	2nd place
Bronze	3rd place
Green	Points finish
Blue	Non-points finish
Blue	Non-classified finish (NC)
Purple	Did not finish (Ret)
Black	Disqualified (DSQ)
Black	Excluded (EX)
White	Did not start (DNS)
White	Race cancelled (C)
White	Withdrew (WD)
Blank	Did not participate

**Bold** – Pole

=== GTC Teams Championship ===
Pos.	Team	Car	SHA (China)	FUJ (Japan)	CHA (Thailand)	SEP (Malaysia)	Points
1	(Hong Kong) #16 Modena Motorsports	Porsche 991 GT3 Cup	**1**				26
2	(Malaysia) #59 EKS Motorsports	Porsche 991 GT3 Cup	2				18
3	(Hong Kong) #21 OpenRoad Racing	Porsche 991 GT3 Cup	3				15
4	(New Zealand) #12 Earl Bamber Motorsport	Porsche 991 GT3 Cup	Ret				0

Key
Colour	Result
Gold	Race winner
Silver	2nd place
Bronze	3rd place
Green	Points finish
Blue	Non-points finish
Blue	Non-classified finish (NC)
Purple	Did not finish (Ret)
Black	Disqualified (DSQ)
Black	Excluded (EX)
White	Did not start (DNS)
White	Race cancelled (C)
White	Withdrew (WD)
Blank	Did not participate

**Bold** – Pole

== Drivers championships ==
Points are awarded according to the following structure:

Position	**1st**	**2nd**	**3rd**	**4th**	**5th**	**6th**	**7th**	**8th**	**9th**	**10th**	**Other**	**Pole**
Points	25	18	15	12	10	8	6	4	2	1	0.5	1

=== LMP2 Drivers Championship ===
Pos.	Driver	SHA (China)	FUJ (Japan)	CHA (Thailand)	SEP (Malaysia)	Points
1	(United Kingdom) Paul di Resta	2	**2**	1	2	80
1	(United Kingdom) Phil Hanson	2	**2**	1	2	80
2	(France) Andrea Pizzitola	Ret	1	**2**	1	69
2	(United Kingdom) Harrison Newey	Ret	1	**2**	1	69
3	(United Kingdom) Darren Burke	4	3	4	4	51
3	(China) Kang Ling	4	3	4	4	51
3	(Slovakia) Miroslav Konôpka	4	3	4	4	51
4	(France) François Hériau	6	4	3	3	50
4	(France) Matthieu Lahaye	6	4	3	3	50
5	(United Kingdom) Alexander West	**1**	6		5	45
5	(France) Côme Ledogar	**1**	6		5	45
5	(Brazil) Pipo Derani	**1**	6		5	45
6	(Philippines) Ate de Jong			**2**	1	44
7	(France) Jean-Baptiste Lahaye	6		3	3	38
8	(United States) Guy Cosmo	3	5	6	Ret	33
8	(United States) Patrick Byrne	3	5	6	Ret	33
8	(Turkey) Salih Yoluç	3	5	6	Ret	33
9	(Denmark) Anders Fjordbach	5	7	5	Ret	26
9	(United States) Chris McMurry	5	7	5	Ret	26
9	(United States) Mark Patterson	5	7	5	Ret	26
10	(Malaysia) Jazeman Jaafar	Ret				0
10	(Malaysia) Nabil Jeffri	Ret				0
10	(Malaysia) Weiron Tan	Ret				0

Key
Colour	Result
Gold	Race winner
Silver	2nd place
Bronze	3rd place
Green	Points finish
Blue	Non-points finish
Blue	Non-classified finish (NC)
Purple	Did not finish (Ret)
Black	Disqualified (DSQ)
Black	Excluded (EX)
White	Did not start (DNS)
White	Race cancelled (C)
White	Withdrew (WD)
Blank	Did not participate

**Bold** – Pole

=== LMP2 Am Drivers Championship ===
Pos.	Driver	SHA (China)	FUJ (Japan)	CHA (Thailand)	SEP (Malaysia)	Points
1	(United Kingdom) Darren Burke	3	1	**1**	1	94
1	(China) Kang Ling	3	1	**1**	1	94
1	(Slovakia) Miroslav Konôpka	3	1	**1**	1	94
2	(United States) Guy Cosmo	1	**2**	3	Ret	60
2	(United States) Patrick Byrne	1	**2**	3	Ret	60
2	(Turkey) Salih Yoluç	1	**2**	3	Ret	60
3	(Denmark) Anders Fjordbach	3	3	2	**Ret**	49
3	(United States) Chris McMurry	3	3	2	**Ret**	49
3	(United States) Mark Patterson	3	3	2	**Ret**	49

Key
Colour	Result
Gold	Race winner
Silver	2nd place
Bronze	3rd place
Green	Points finish
Blue	Non-points finish
Blue	Non-classified finish (NC)
Purple	Did not finish (Ret)
Black	Disqualified (DSQ)
Black	Excluded (EX)
White	Did not start (DNS)
White	Race cancelled (C)
White	Withdrew (WD)
Blank	Did not participate

**Bold** – Pole

=== LMP3 Drivers Championship ===
Pos.	Driver	SHA (China)	FUJ (Japan)	CHA (Thailand)	SEP (Malaysia)	Points
1	(Poland) Jakub Śmiechowski	**1**	2	2	1	87
1	(Germany) Martin Hippe	**1**	2	2	1	87
2	(United Kingdom) Chris Buncombe	2	5	**1**	**3**	70
2	(Canada) Garett Grist	2	5	**1**	**3**	70
2	(United Kingdom) Wayne Boyd	2	5	**1**	**3**	70
3	(United Kingdom) Anthony Wells	4	3	3	4	54
3	(United Kingdom) Colin Noble	4	3	3	4	54
4	(Netherlands) Kay van Berlo	6	1	5	5	53
4	(United Kingdom) Matthew Bell	6	1	5	5	53
5	(Denmark) Christian Stubbe Olsen	5	4	4	3	52
5	(United Kingdom) Nick Adcock	5	4	4	3	52
6	(Australia) Aidan Read	3	Ret	6	6	31
6	(Japan) Nobuya Yamanaka	3	Ret	6	6	31
7	(United States) James McGuire	6		5	5	28
8	(United Kingdom) Christian England		1			25
9	(Malaysia) Douglas Khoo	8	**6**	8	7	23
9	(United Kingdom) Nigel Moore	8	**6**	8	7	23
10	(Japan) Marie Iwaoka	7	7	7		18
11	(Netherlands) Stéphane Kox	7		7		12
12	(Belgium) Sarah Bovy	7				6
12	(Japan) Sayaka Katō		7			6
13	(United Kingdom) Katherine Legge				8	4
13	(Denmark) Michelle Gatting				8	4
13	(France) Margot Laffite				8	4
14	(China) Wei Chaoyin	9				2
14	(Switzerland) Hugo de Sadeleer	9				2
14	(United Kingdom) Mike Simpson				9	2
14	(Australia) Neale Muston	DSQ			9	2
15	(Australia) Jake Parsons				10	1
15	(Australia) Jamie Winslow				10	1
15	(South Korea) Rick Yoon				10	1
16	(South Korea) Hwang Do-yun	DSQ				0

Key
Colour	Result
Gold	Race winner
Silver	2nd place
Bronze	3rd place
Green	Points finish
Blue	Non-points finish
Blue	Non-classified finish (NC)
Purple	Did not finish (Ret)
Black	Disqualified (DSQ)
Black	Excluded (EX)
White	Did not start (DNS)
White	Race cancelled (C)
White	Withdrew (WD)
Blank	Did not participate

**Bold** – Pole

=== GT Drivers Championship ===
Pos.	Driver	SHA (China)	FUJ (Japan)	CHA (Thailand)	SEP (Malaysia)	Points
1	(United Kingdom) James Calado	1	**1**	1	1	101
1	(Japan) Kei Cozzolino	1	**1**	1	1	101
1	(Japan) Takeshi Kimura	1	**1**	1	1	101
2	(Italy) Alessandro Pier Guidi	2	2	**3**	3	67
2	(Puerto Rico) Francesco Piovanetti	2	2	**3**	3	67
2	(Brazil) Oswaldo Negri Jr.	2	2	**3**	3	67
3	(China) Chen Weian	**Ret**	4	2	**2**	50
4	(China) Xu Wei	4	3		**2**	46
5	(Italy) Max Wiser	4	3	4	Ret	39
6	(United Kingdom) Johnny Mowlem	3	5	Ret	4	37
7	(Belgium) Dries Vanthoor	**Ret**	4		**2**	32
8	(China) Zhang Yaqi	**Ret**	3	4	Ret	28
9	(United Kingdom) Bonamy Grimes	3	5	Ret		25
10	(United Kingdom) Ivor Dunbar		5	Ret	4	22
11	(Hong Kong) Alex Au			2		18
11	(France) Jean-Karl Vernay			2		18
12	(China) Anthony Liu Xu		4			12
12	(Macau) Lo Kai Fung			4		12
13	(China) Qi Peiwen				Ret	0

Key
Colour	Result
Gold	Race winner
Silver	2nd place
Bronze	3rd place
Green	Points finish
Blue	Non-points finish
Blue	Non-classified finish (NC)
Purple	Did not finish (Ret)
Black	Disqualified (DSQ)
Black	Excluded (EX)
White	Did not start (DNS)
White	Race cancelled (C)
White	Withdrew (WD)
Blank	Did not participate

**Bold** – Pole

=== GT Am Drivers Championship ===
Pos.	Driver	SHA (China)	FUJ (Japan)	CHA (Thailand)	SEP (Malaysia)	Points
1	(Italy) Max Wiser		**1**	**1**		78
2	(China) Xu Wei	**1**	**1**			52
2	(China) Zhang Yaqi		**1**	**1**		52
3	(Macau) Lo Kai Fung			**1**		26
4	(United Kingdom) Bonamy Grimes			Ret		0
4	(United Kingdom) Ivor Dunbar			Ret		0
4	(United Kingdom) Johnny Mowlem			Ret		0

Key
Colour	Result
Gold	Race winner
Silver	2nd place
Bronze	3rd place
Green	Points finish
Blue	Non-points finish
Blue	Non-classified finish (NC)
Purple	Did not finish (Ret)
Black	Disqualified (DSQ)
Black	Excluded (EX)
White	Did not start (DNS)
White	Race cancelled (C)
White	Withdrew (WD)
Blank	Did not participate

**Bold** – Pole

=== GTC Drivers Championship ===
Pos.	Driver	SHA (China)	FUJ (Japan)	CHA (Thailand)	SEP (Malaysia)	Points
1	(Denmark) Benny Simonsen	**1**				26
1	(France) Philippe Descombes	**1**				26
2	(China) Bao Jinlong	2				18
2	(China) Lu Wenlong	2				18
3	(Netherlands) Francis Tjia	3				15
3	(Indonesia) Michael Soeryadjaya	3				15
4	(New Zealand) Graeme Dowsett	Ret				0
4	(Chinese Taipei) Jeffrey Chiang	Ret				0
4	(New Zealand) Will Bamber	Ret				0

Key
Colour	Result
Gold	Race winner
Silver	2nd place
Bronze	3rd place
Green	Points finish
Blue	Non-points finish
Blue	Non-classified finish (NC)
Purple	Did not finish (Ret)
Black	Disqualified (DSQ)
Black	Excluded (EX)
White	Did not start (DNS)
White	Race cancelled (C)
White	Withdrew (WD)
Blank	Did not participate

**Bold** – Pole
