= Chris McMurry =

American racing driver (born 1965)

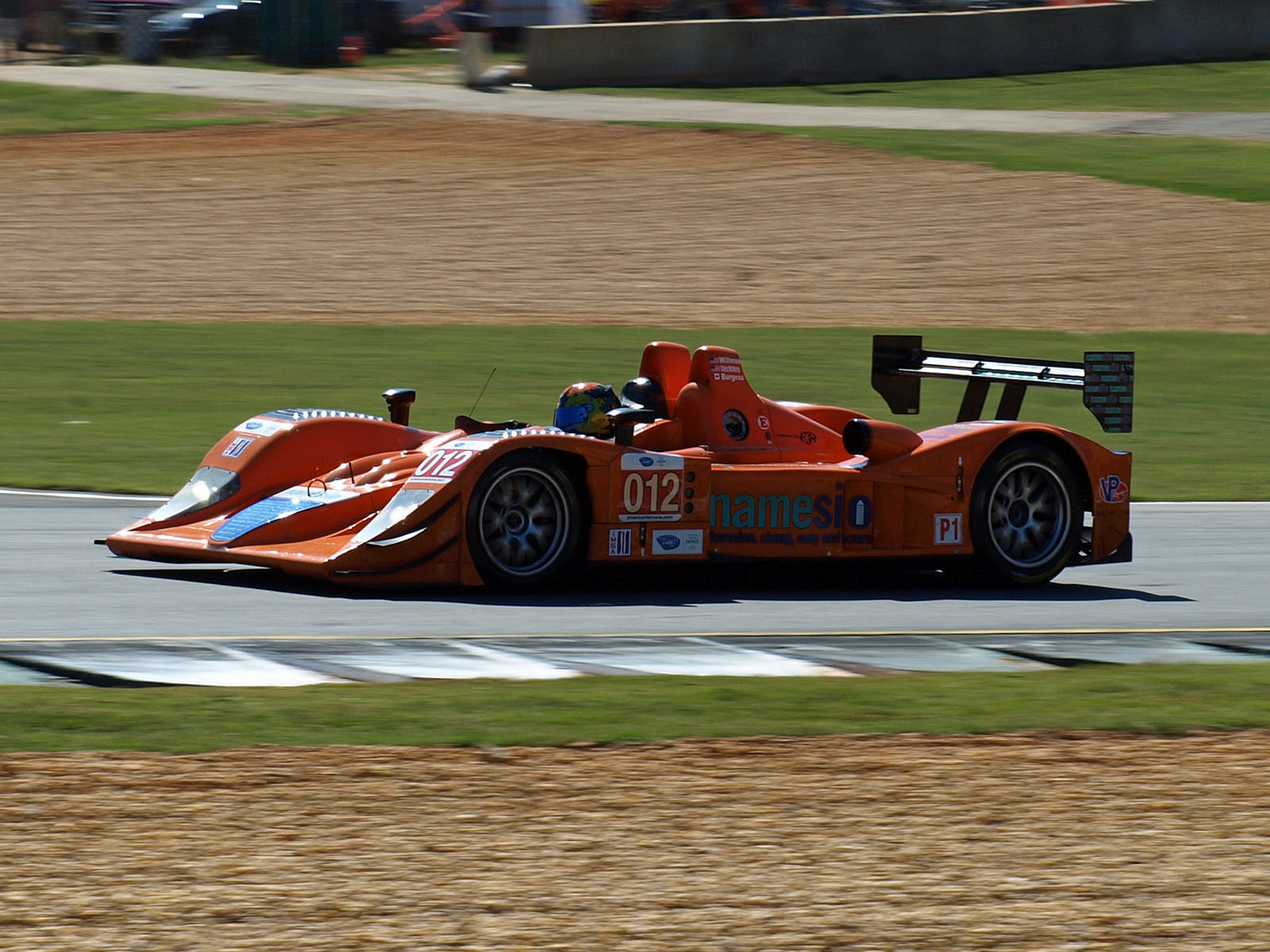
- McMurry in 2011
- Nationality: (United States) American
- Born: May 5, 1965 (age 61) Milwaukee, Wisconsin, U.S.
- Relatives: Matt McMurry (son)

American Le Mans Series career
- Categorisation: FIA Silver (until 2016); FIA Bronze (2017–)
- Years active: 2001–2013
- Teams: Team Bucknum Racing; Autocon Motorsports; Miracle Motorsports; Dyson Racing Team
- Starts: 76
- Wins: 6
- Podiums: 25
- Poles: 3
- Fastest laps: 0
- Best finish: 3rd in 2013

Chris McMurry (born May 5, 1965) is an American racing driver who last competed for Algarve Pro Racing in the Asian Le Mans Series.

After retiring at the conclusion of the 2013 American Le Mans Series season, McMurry returned to racing, first in the 2018–19 Asian Le Mans Series season and later in the Radical Cup North America. His 2024 season was chronicled by Radical on its YouTube channel.

== Racing record ==
=== Career summary ===
Season	Series	Team	Races	Wins	Poles	F/Laps	Podiums	Points	Position
1999	Star Mazda Championship		3	0	0	0	0	0	NC
2000	Star Mazda Championship	Team Bucknum Racing	8	0	0	0	0	164	10th
2001	Star Mazda Championship	Team Bucknum Racing	3	0	0	0	0	68	30th
2001	American Le Mans Series - LMP675	Team Bucknum Racing	1	0	0	0	0	0	NC
2001	Grand American Rolex Series - SRP II	Team Bucknum Racing	1	0	0	0	0	27	40th
2002	American Le Mans Series - LMP675	Team Bucknum Racing	8	3	0	0	4	164	4th
2003	American Le Mans Series - LMP675	Team Bucknum Racing	9	0	0	0	1	24	15th
2003	24 Hours of Le Mans - LMP675	Team Bucknum Racing	1	0	0	0	0	N/A	NC
2004	American Le Mans Series - LMP2	Team Bucknum Racing; Miracle Motorsports	6	0	2	0	2	32	8th
2005	American Le Mans Series - LMP2	Miracle Motorsports	10	3	1	0	6	118	**2nd**
2006	American Le Mans Series - LMP1	Autocon Motorsports	9	0	0	0	2	41	10th
2007	American Le Mans Series - LMP1	Autocon Motorsports	8	0	0	0	1	89	5th
2008	American Le Mans Series - LMP1	Autocon Motorsports	7	0	0	0	1	41	9th
2008	24 Hours of Le Mans - LMP1	Autocon	1	0	0	0	0	N/A	NC
2009	American Le Mans Series - LMP1	Autocon Motorsports	6	0	0	0	1	49	7th
2010	Le Mans Series - LMP1	Team LNT	1	0	0	0	0	6	25th
2010	Intercontinental Le Mans Cup - LMP1	Team LNT	2	0	0	0	0	0	NC
2010	American Le Mans Series - LMP1	Autocon Motorsports	1	0	0	0	0	0	NC
2011	American Le Mans Series - LMP1	Autocon	6	0	0	0	3	85	4th
2011	Intercontinental Le Mans Cup - LMP1	AutoCon Racing	1	0	0	0	0	0	NC
2012	American Le Mans Series - LMP1	Dyson Racing Team	1	0	0	0	0	17	9th
2013	American Le Mans Series - LMP1	Dyson Racing Team	4	0	0	0	4	68	**3rd**
2018–19	Asian Le Mans Series - LMP2	Algarve Pro Racing	4	0	0	0	0	26	9th
2022	Radical World Finals - Pro 1340		4	0	0	1	3	0	4th
2023–24	Asian Le Mans Series - LMP2	Algarve Pro Racing	5	1	0	0	1	45	7th
2026	IMSA VP Racing SportsCar Challenge - LMP3	Crown Racing	1	0	0	0	0	220	29th

=== Complete American Le Mans Series results ===
(key) (Races in bold indicate pole position; results in italics indicate fastest lap)

Year	Team	Class	Make	Engine	1	2	3	4	5	6	7	8	9	10	11	12	Pos.	Points	Ref
2001	Team Bucknum Racing	LMP675	Pilbeam MP84	Nissan (AER) VQL 3.0 L V6	TEX	SEB	DON	JAR	SON	POR	MOS	MDO	LGA	PET; Ret			NC	0	
2002	Team Bucknum Racing	LMP675	Pilbeam MP84	Nissan (AER) VQL 3.0 L V6	SEB; Ret	SON; DNS	MDO; 1	ELK; Ret	WAS; 2	TRO; 1	MOS; 1	LGA; 5	MIA; Ret	PET; Ret			4th	164	
2003	Team Bucknum Racing	LMP675	Pilbeam MP91	Willman (JPX) 3.4 L V6	SEB; Ret	ATL; Ret	SON; Ret	TRO; Ret	MOS; 2	ELK; 5	LGA; Ret	MIA; Ret	PET; Ret				15th	24	
2004	Team Bucknum Racing	LMP2	Pilbeam MP91	Willman (JPX) 3.4 L V6	SEB; Ret	**MDO**; Ret	**LRP**; Ret	SON; 3	POR; Ret	MOS	ELK; Ret						8th	32	
2004	Miracle Motorsports	LMP2	Lola B2K/40	Nissan (AER) VQL 3.0 L V6								PET; Ret	LGA; 2				8th	32	
2005	Miracle Motorsports	LMP2	Courage C65	AER P07 2.0 L Turbo I4	SEB; 1	ATL; Ret	MDO	**LIM**; 1	SON; 2	POR; Ret	ELK; 1	MOS; 2	PET; Ret	LGA; 2			2nd	118	
2006	Autocon Motorsports	LMP1	MG-Lola EX257	AER P07 2.0 L Turbo I4	SEB; Ret	TEX; Ret	MDO; 3	LIM; 2	UTA; Ret	POR; 6	ELK; 6	MOS; 2	PET; Ret	LGA			10th	41	
2007	Autocon Motorsports	LMP1	MG-Lola EX257	AER P07 2.0 L Turbo I4	SEB; 4	STP; Ret	LBH; 4										5th	89	
2007	Autocon Motorsports	LMP1	Creation CA06/H	Judd GV5 5.0 L V10				TEX	UTA	LIM; 3	MDO; Ret	ELK; Ret	MOS; 3	DET	PET; 5	LGA; Ret	5th	89	
2008	Autocon Motorsports	LMP1	Creation CA07	Judd GV5 5.0 L V10	SEB; Ret	STP; 3	LBH; 4	UTA	LRP	MDO; 4	ELK; Ret						9th	41	
2008	Autocon Motorsports	LMP1	Creation CA06/H	Judd GV5 5.0 L V10								MOS; Ret	DET				9th	41	
2008	Autocon Motorsports	LMP1	Lola B06/10	AER P32C 4.0 L Turbo V8										PET; Ret	LGA; 6		9th	41	
2009	Autocon Motorsports	LMP1	Lola B06/10	AER P32C 4.0 L Turbo V8	SEB; Ret	STP	LBH	UTA	LRP; 4	MDO	ELK; 5	MOS; Ret	PET; Ret	LGA; 3			7th	49	
2010	Autocon Motorsports	LMP1	Lola B06/10	AER P32T 4.0 L Turbo V8	SEB	LBH	LGA	UTA	LRP	MDO	ELK	MOS	PET; Ret				NC	0	
2011	Autocon	LMP1	Lola B06/10	AER P32C 4.0 L Turbo V8 (Isobutanol)	SEB	LBH	LRP	MOS; Ret	MDO; 3	ELK; 3	BAL; 3	LGA; Ret	PET; Ret				4th	85	
2012	Dyson Racing Team	LMP1	Lola B11/66	Mazda MZR-R 2.0 L Turbo I4 (Isobutanol)	SEB	LBH	LGA	LRP	MOS	MDO	ELK	BAL	VIR	PET; Ret†			9th	17	
2013	Dyson Racing Team	LMP1	Lola B12/60	Mazda MZR-R 2.0 L Turbo I4 (Isobutanol)	SEB	LBH	LGA	LRP	MOS; 2	ELK; 2	BAL	AUS; 2	VIR	PET; 2			3rd	68	

^{†} Did not finish the race but was classified as his car completed more than 70% of the overall winner's race distance.

=== Complete 24 Hours of Le Mans results ===
Year	Team	Co-Drivers	Car	Class	Laps	Pos.	Class Pos.
2003	(United States) Team Bucknum Racing	(United States) Jeff Bucknum (United States) Bryan Willman	Pilbeam MP91	LMP675	27	DNF	DNF
2008	(United States) Autocon Motorsports (United Kingdom) Creation Autosportif	(United States) Michael Lewis (United States) Bryan Willman	Creation CA07	LMP2	224	DNF	DNF

=== Complete Le Mans Series results ===
(key) (Races in bold indicate pole position; results in italics indicate fastest lap)

Year	Entrant	Class	Chassis	Engine	1	2	3	4	5	Rank	Points
2010	Team LNT	LMP1	Ginetta-Zytek GZ09S	Zytek ZJ458 4.5 L V8	LEC	SPA	POR	HUN	SIL; 9	25th	6

=== Complete Asian Le Mans Series results ===
(key) (Races in bold indicate pole position; results in italics indicate fastest lap)

Year	Entrant	Class	Chassis	Engine	1	2	3	4	5	Rank	Points
2018–19	(Portugal) Algarve Pro Racing	LMP2	Ligier JS P2	Judd HK 3.6 L V8	SHA; 5	FUJ; 7	BUR; 5	SEP; Ret		9th	26
2023–24	(Portugal) Algarve Pro Racing	LMP2	Oreca 07	Gibson GK428 4.2 L V8	SEP; 1; 8	SEP; 2; 9	DUB; 6	ABU; 1; 7	ABU; 2; 1	7th	45
