= 4 Hours of Shanghai =

- Venue: Shanghai International Circuit
- First race: 2012
- Last race: 2019
- Duration: 4 hours
- Previous names: 6 Hours of Shanghai
- Most wins (driver): (Australia) Mark Webber (2) (Germany) Timo Bernhard (2) (New Zealand) Brendon Hartley (2) (Switzerland) Sébastien Buemi (2) (United Kingdom) Anthony Davidson (2)
- Most wins (team): (Japan) Toyota Gazoo Racing (4)
- Most wins (manufacturer): Toyota (4)

The 4 Hours of Shanghai (previously 6 Hours of Shanghai) was a sports car race that was held at the Shanghai International Circuit in Jiading District of Shanghai in the People's Republic of China. It was created for the FIA World Endurance Championship, and was held for the first time on 28 October 2012 as the eighth and final round of the 2012 World Endurance Championship.

== Results ==
Year	Overall winner(s)	Entrant	Car	Distance	Race title	Championship	Report	Ref
6 hour format
2012	(Austria) Alexander Wurz (France) Nicolas Lapierre	(Japan) Toyota Racing	Toyota TS030 Hybrid	1,041.141 km (646.935 mi)	6 Hours of Shanghai	FIA World Endurance Championship	Report	
2013	(Germany) André Lotterer (France) Benoît Tréluyer (Switzerland) Marcel Fässler	(Germany) Audi Sport Team Joest	Audi R18 e-tron quattro	1,035.690 km (643.548 mi)	6 Hours of Shanghai	FIA World Endurance Championship	Report	
2014	(United Kingdom) Anthony Davidson (Switzerland) Sébastien Buemi	(Japan) Toyota Racing	Toyota TS040 Hybrid	1,024.788 km (636.774 mi)	6 Hours of Shanghai	FIA World Endurance Championship	Report	
2015	(Australia) Mark Webber (Germany) Timo Bernhard (New Zealand) Brendon Hartley	(Germany) Porsche Team	Porsche 919 Hybrid	921.219 km (572.419 mi)	6 Hours of Shanghai	FIA World Endurance Championship	Report	
2016	(Australia) Mark Webber (Germany) Timo Bernhard (New Zealand) Brendon Hartley	(Germany) Porsche Team	Porsche 919 Hybrid	1,062.945 km (660.483 mi)	6 Hours of Shanghai	FIA World Endurance Championship	Report	
2017	(Switzerland) Sébastien Buemi (United Kingdom) Anthony Davidson (Japan) Kazuki Nakajima	(Japan) Toyota Gazoo Racing	Toyota TS050 Hybrid	1,084.749 km (674.032 mi)	6 Hours of Shanghai	FIA World Endurance Championship	Report	
2018	(United Kingdom) Mike Conway (Japan) Kamui Kobayashi (Argentina) José María López	(Japan) Toyota Gazoo Racing	Toyota TS050 Hybrid	615.963 km (382.742 mi)	6 Hours of Shanghai	FIA World Endurance Championship	Report	
4 hour format
2019	(United States) Gustavo Menezes (France) Norman Nato (Brazil) Bruno Senna	(Switzerland) Rebellion Racing	Rebellion R13-Gibson	681.375 km (423.387 mi)	4 Hours of Shanghai	FIA World Endurance Championship	Report	

=== Records ===
==== Wins by constructor ====
Rank	Constructor	Wins	Years
1	(Japan) Toyota	4	2012, 2014, 2017–18
2	(Germany) Porsche	2	2015–16
3	(Germany) Audi	1	2013
3	(France) Oreca	1	2019

==== Wins by engine supplier ====
Rank	Engine suppler	Wins	Years
1	(Japan) Toyota	4	2012, 2014, 2017–18
2	(Germany) Porsche	2	2015–16
3	(Germany) Audi	1	2013
3	(United Kingdom) Gibson	1	2019

==== Wins by team ====
Rank	Team	Wins	Years
1	(Japan) Toyota Gazoo Racing	4	2012, 2014, 2017–18
2	(Germany) Porsche Team	2	2015–16
3	(Germany) Audi Sport Team Joest	1	2013
3	(Switzerland) Rebellion Racing	1	2019

=== Asian Le Mans Series ===
Year	Overall Winner(s)	Entrant	Car	Duration	Race Title	Championship	Report	Ref
2014	(China) David Cheng (China) Ho-Pin Tung	(France) OAK Racing Team Total	Morgan LMP2	3:00:01	3 Hours of Shanghai	Asian Le Mans Series	report	
2018	(Brazil) Pipo Derani (France) Côme Ledogar (Sweden) Alexander West	(Switzerland) Spirit of Race	Ligier JS P2	4:03:43	4 Hours of Shanghai	Asian Le Mans Series	report	
2019	(United States) James French (Netherlands) Leonard Hoogenboom (Russia) Roman Rusinov	(Russia) G-Drive Racing with Algarve	Aurus 01	4:02:04	4 Hours of Shanghai	Asian Le Mans Series	report	
