= Jackie Chan DC Racing =

Chinese Sportscar Racing Team

(China) Jackie Chan DC Racing
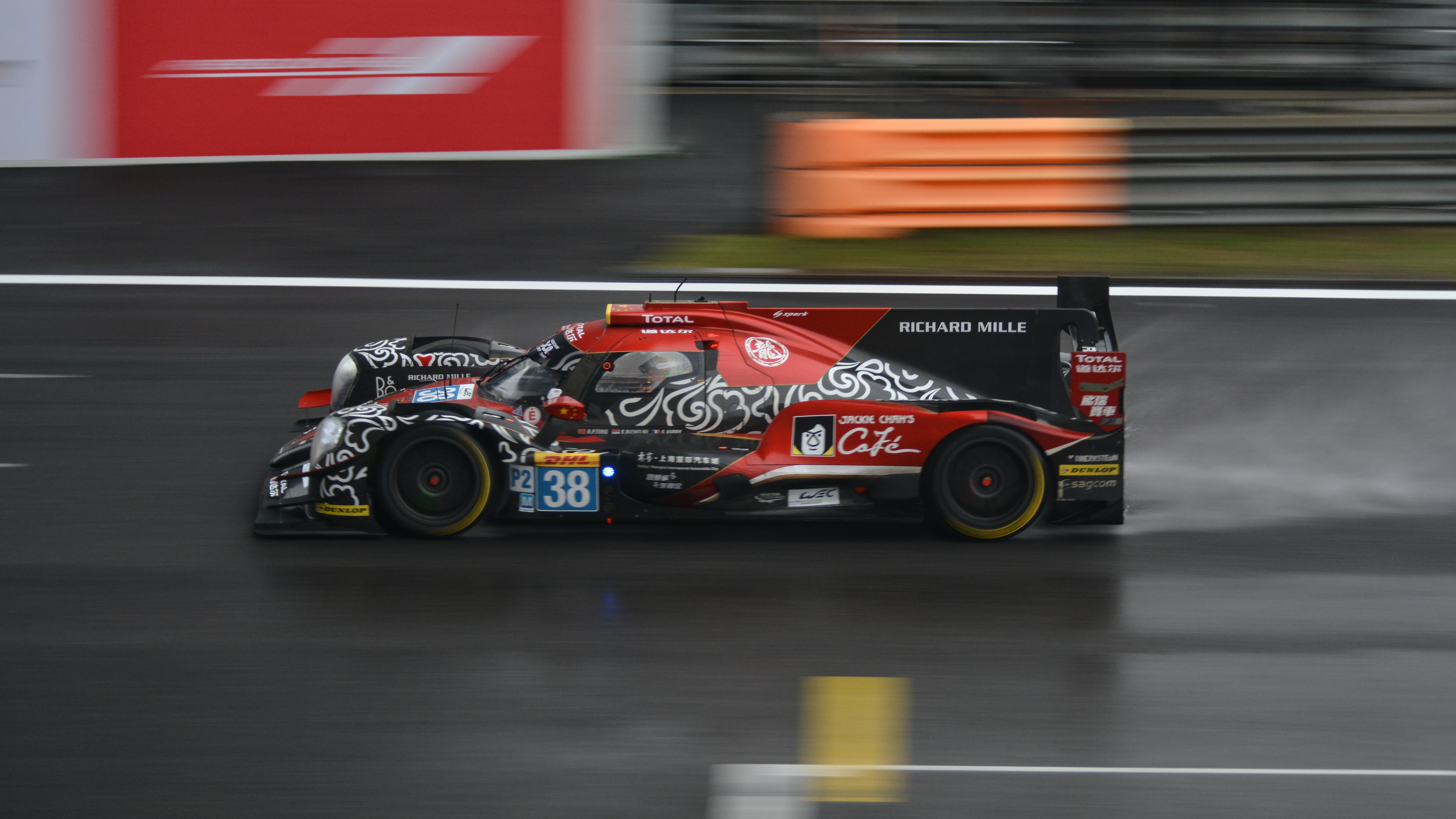
- Founded: 20 August 2015
- Founder(s): David Cheng; Jackie Chan
- Base: Wuhan, Hubei, China
- Former series: Asian Le Mans Series; WeatherTech SportsCar Championship; FIA World Endurance Championship
- Noted drivers: (United States) Gustavo Menezes (United States) David Cheng (France) Tristan Gommendy (United Kingdom) Alex Brundle (Denmark) David Heinemeier Hansson (United Kingdom) Jordan King (United States) Ricky Taylor (Monaco) Stéphane Richelmi
- Teams' Championships: 2 Asian Le Mans Series (2015–16), (2017–18)
- Drivers' Championships: 2 Asian Le Mans Series (2015–16), (2017–18)

Jackie Chan DC Racing, formerly known as DC Racing, is a racing team that competed in the FIA World Endurance Championship, European Le Mans Series and Asian Le Mans Series, with plans to make a return to the IMSA SportsCar Championship in 2023. The team is co-owned by Asian Le Mans champion David Cheng and actor Jackie Chan. Partnering with Jota Sport in WEC, the team fields Oreca 07: the No. 37 for Ho-Pin Tung, Gabriel Aubry and Will Stevens.

== History ==
In 2015, two-time Asian Le Mans Series champion David Cheng formed DC Racing. Based in Wuhan, the team hired OAK Racing personnel Remy Brouard, for whom Cheng raced, as team principal. DC Racing also established a partnership with Eurasia Motorsport, fielding a Ligier JS P3 in the LMP3 class for Cheng, former OAK Racing teammate and fellow Chinese driver Ho-Pin Tung and Frenchman Thomas Laurent. The team ended the season with the Team Championship and a spot in the 2016 24 Hours of Le Mans.

=== Jackie Chan ===
In March 2015, Cheng met actor and martial artist Jackie Chan, who discussed his enjoyment of Steve McQueen's movie Le Mans as well as his interest in racing. After Cheng finished ninth in the LMP2 class at Le Mans that year, Chan raised the possibility of owning a team together for 2016, to which Cheng agreed. Together, the two entered DC Racing into the FIA World Endurance Championship under the Baxi DC Racing Alpine banner, partnering with Signatech Alpine and fielding rebadged Oreca 05 cars as Alpine A460s in the LMP2 class. The team is the first mainland China-based operation in WEC; Cheng and Tung joined the new program, along with French drivers Nelson Panciatici and Paul-Loup Chatin.

=== Asian Le Mans Series ===
In October, leading into the 2016–17 Asian Le Mans Series season, the team was rebranded to Jackie Chan DC Racing and raced with liveries promoting Chan's movie Kung Fu Yoga. DC Racing fielded cars in both the LMP2 and LMP3 classes; Tung, Laurent and Gustavo Menezes raced in the former, while Cheng, James Winslow and Pu Jun Jin drove in the latter.

=== FIA World Endurance Championship ===
For the 2017 WEC season, the team partnered with Jota Sport to run the No. 37 for Cheng, Alex Brundle and Tristan Gommendy, along with the No. 38 for Tung, Laurent and Oliver Jarvis. At Le Mans, the No. 38 took advantage of a small LMP1 grid and problems striking the LMP1s to lead overall laps, becoming the first LMP2 team to do so at Le Mans. With one hour remaining, the No. 2 Porsche of Timo Bernhard passed Tung and went on to win the overall, although the No. 38's second-place overall finish was still impressive nonetheless and won DC Racing the LMP2 class. DC's No. 37 car finished fourth overall, but Rebellion Racing's No. 13 was disqualified after failing post-race inspection and the No. 37 was promoted onto the podium. The No. 38's effort marked the first time a Chinese team won its class at Le Mans. Chan, who was not present at the race, congratulated the team on its performance.

=== Departure from motorsport ===
The team pulled out of all motorsports in 2020 at the beginning for the COVID-19 pandemic. The reason for the departure as said in a statement was mostly due to personal and financial issues as quoted in Autosport by team owner David Cheng on March 18, 2022, "The world situation meant we had to step back from racing, because I had to focus on the family business, which is based in Wuhan".

== Results ==
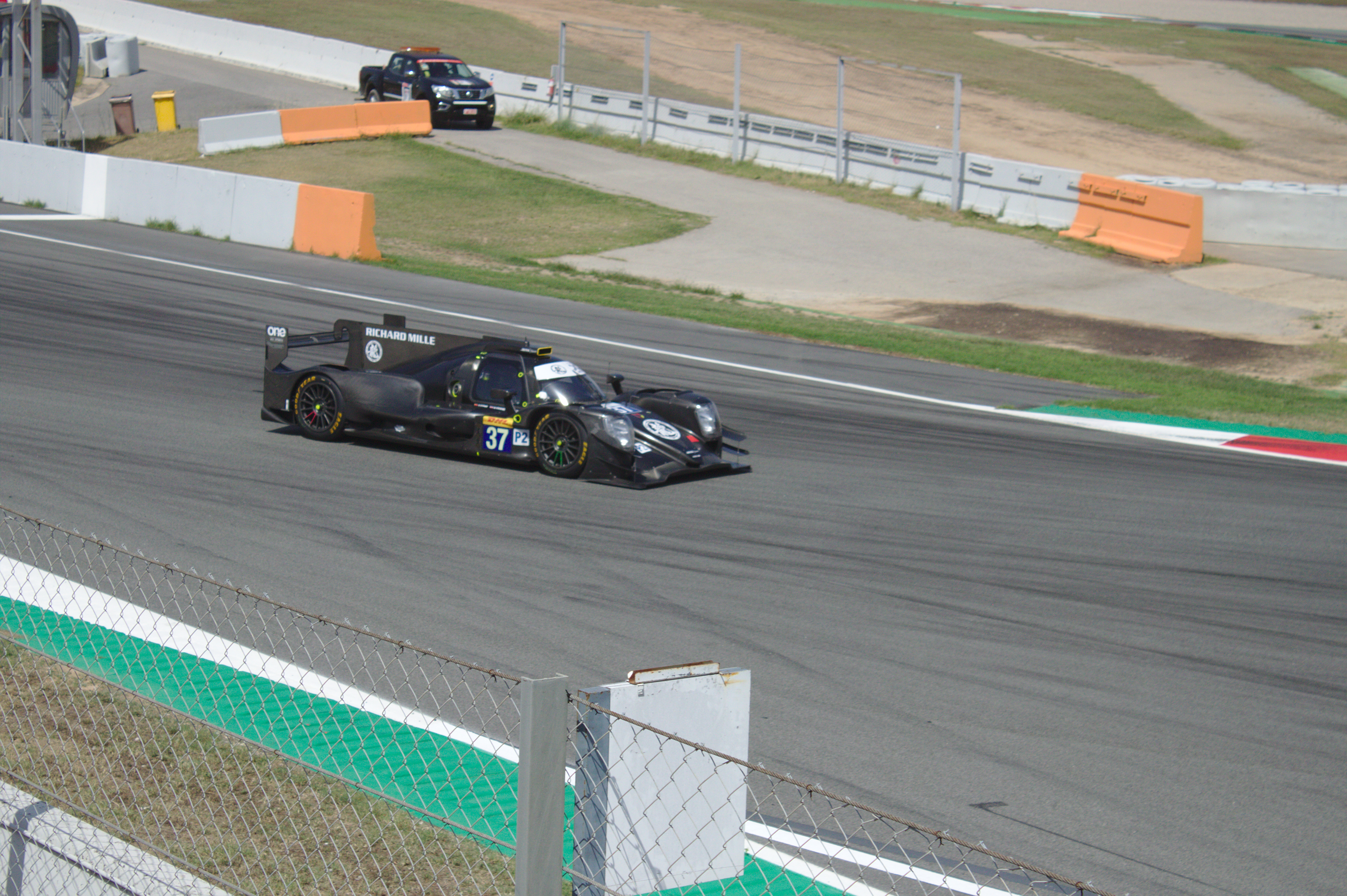
Jackie Chan DC Racing testing their Oreca 07 chassis at the 2019 World Endurance Championship Prologue in Circuit de Barcelona-Catalunya.

=== 24 Hours of Le Mans results ===
Year	Entrant	Team	No.	Car	Drivers	Class	Laps	Pos.	Class Pos.
2016	(China) Baxi DC Racing Alpine	Signatech	35	Alpine A460-Nissan	(United States) David Cheng (France) Nelson Panciatici (China) Ho-Pin Tung	LMP2	234	DNF	DNF
2017	(China) Jackie Chan DC Racing	Jota Sport	37	Oreca 07-Gibson	(United Kingdom) Alex Brundle (United States) David Cheng (France) Tristan Gommendy	LMP2	363	3rd	2nd
2017	(China) Jackie Chan DC Racing	Jota Sport	38	Oreca 07-Gibson	(United Kingdom) Oliver Jarvis (France) Thomas Laurent (China) Ho-Pin Tung	LMP2	366	2nd	1st
2018	(China) Jackie Chan DC Racing	OAK Racing	33	Ligier JS P217-Gibson	(United States) Nick Boulle (United States) David Cheng (France) Pierre Nicolet	LMP2	355	12th	8th
2018	(China) Jackie Chan DC Racing	OAK Racing	34	Ligier JS P217-Gibson	(Denmark) David Heinemeier Hansson (France) Côme Ledogar (United States) Ricky Taylor	LMP2	195	DNF	DNF
2018	(China) Jackie Chan DC Racing	Jota Sport	37	Oreca 07-Gibson	(Malaysia) Jazeman Jaafar (Malaysia) Nabil Jeffri (Malaysia) Weiron Tan	LMP2	361	8th	4th
2018	(China) Jackie Chan DC Racing	Jota Sport	38	Oreca 07-Gibson	(France) Gabriel Aubry (Monaco) Stephane Richelmi (China) Ho-Pin Tung	LMP2	356	10th	6th
2019	(China) Jackie Chan DC Racing	Jota Sport	37	Oreca 07-Gibson	(Denmark) David Heinemeier Hansson (United Kingdom) Jordan King (United States) Ricky Taylor	LMP2	199	DNF	DNF
2019	(China) Jackie Chan DC Racing	Jota Sport	38	Oreca 07-Gibson	(France) Gabriel Aubry (Monaco) Stephane Richelmi (China) Ho-Pin Tung	LMP2	367	7th	2nd
2020	(China) Jackie Chan DC Racing	Jota Sport	37	Oreca 07-Gibson	(France) Gabriel Aubry (United Kingdom) Will Stevens (China) Ho-Pin Tung	LMP2	141	DSQ	DSQ

=== Complete FIA World Endurance Championship results ===
Year	Entrant	Class	Drivers	No.	1	2	3	4	5	6	7	8	9	Points	WEP pos.
2016	Baxi DC Racing Alpine	LMP2	(United States) David Cheng (Netherlands) Ho-Pin Tung (France) Nelson Panciatici (France) Paul-Loup Chatin	35	SIL; 6	SPA; Ret	LMN; Ret	NÜR; 7	MEX; 5	COA; 8	FUJ; 9	SHA; 8	BHR; 6	42	9th
2017	Jackie Chan DC Racing	LMP2	(United States) David Cheng (France) Tristan Gommendy (United Kingdom) Alex Brundle	37	SIL; 8	SPA; 10	LMN; 2	NÜR; 5	MEX; 6	COA; 5	FUJ; Ret	SHA; 8	BHR; 8	77	7th
2017	Jackie Chan DC Racing	LMP2	(China) Ho-Pin Tung (France) Thomas Laurent (United Kingdom) Oliver Jarvis	38	SIL; 1	SPA; 3	LMN; 1	NÜR; 1	MEX; 9	COA; 4	FUJ; 3	SHA; 4	BHR; 2	175	2nd
2018–19	Jackie Chan DC Racing	LMP2	(Malaysia) Jazeman Jaafar (Malaysia) Weiron Tan (Malaysia) Nabil Jeffri (Denmark) David Heinemeier Hansson (United Kingdom) Jordan King (United Kingdom) Will Stevens (United States) Ricky Taylor	37	SPA; 3	LMN; 2	SIL; 2	FUJ; 1	SHA; 4	SEB; 1	SPA; 6	LMN; Ret		138	3rd
2018–19	Jackie Chan DC Racing	LMP2	(China) Ho-Pin Tung (France) Gabriel Aubry (Monaco) Stéphane Richelmi	38	SPA; 1	LMN; 4	SIL; 1	FUJ; 2	SHA; 1	SEB; 6	SPA; 3	LMN; 2		166	2nd
2019–20	Jackie Chan DC Racing	LMP2	(China) Ho-Pin Tung (France) Gabriel Aubry (United Kingdom) Will Stevens (Republic of Ireland) Ryan Cullen	37	SIL; 4	FUJ; 2	SHA; 2	BHR; 3	COA; 2	SPA; 6	LMN; DSQ	BHR; 1		136	3rd

=== Asian Le Mans Series results ===
Year	Entrant	Class	Car	Drivers	No.	1	2	3	4	Points	Team pos.
2015–16	DC Racing	LMP3	Ligier JS P3	(China) David Cheng (China) Ho-Pin Tung (France) Thomas Laurent	1	FUJ; 1	SEP; 1	THA; 1	MAL; 1	103	1st
2016–17	Jackie Chan DC Racing	LMP2	Oreca 03R	(United States) Gustavo Menezes (China) Ho-Pin Tung (France) Thomas Laurent	35	ZHU; 1	FUJ; 2	THA; 1	SEP; Ret	69	2nd
2016–17	Jackie Chan DC Racing	LMP3	Ligier JS P3	(China) David Cheng (United Kingdom) James Winslow (China) Pu Jun Jin (Japan) Hiroki Yoshida	1	ZHU; 1	FUJ; 3	THA; 6	SEP; 3	63	3rd
2017–18	Jackie Chan DC Racing X Jota	LMP2	Oreca 05	(China) David Cheng (China) Ho-Pin Tung (Malaysia) Jazeman Jaafar (Malaysia) Weiron Tan (Malaysia) Afiq Yazid	7	ZHU; Ret	FUJ; 3	THA; 1	SEP; 5	50	4th
2017–18	Jackie Chan DC Racing X Jota	LMP2	Oreca 05	(France) Thomas Laurent (United Kingdom) Harrison Newey (Monaco) Stéphane Richelmi	8	ZHU; 1	FUJ; 1	THA; 2	SEP; 1	95	1st
2017–18	Jackie Chan DC Racing X Jota	LMP3	Ligier JS P3	(United States) Patrick Byrne (United States) Guy Cosmo (France) Gabriel Aubry	6	ZHU; 3	FUJ; 1	THA; 3	SEP; 1	77	1st
2018–19	Jackie Chan DC Racing X Jota Sport	LMP2	Oreca 05	(Malaysia) Jazeman Jaafar (Malaysia) Weiron Tan (Malaysia) Nabil Jeffri	1	SHA; Ret	FUJ	THA	SEP	0	8th
2018–19	Jackie Chan DC Racing X Jota Sport	LMP3	Ligier JS P3	(Japan) Yoshiharu Mori (South Korea) Hwang Doyun (Australia) Neale Muston	37	SHA; DSQ	FUJ	THA	SEP	0	11th
2018–19	Jackie Chan DC Racing X Jota Sport	LMP3	Ligier JS P3	(China) Neric Wei (Switzerland) Hugo de Sadeleer (Australia) Jake Parsons (Australia) Jamie Winslow (South Korea) Rick Yoon	38	SHA; 9	FUJ	THA	SEP; 10	3	9th
