= Harrison Newey =

British racing driver

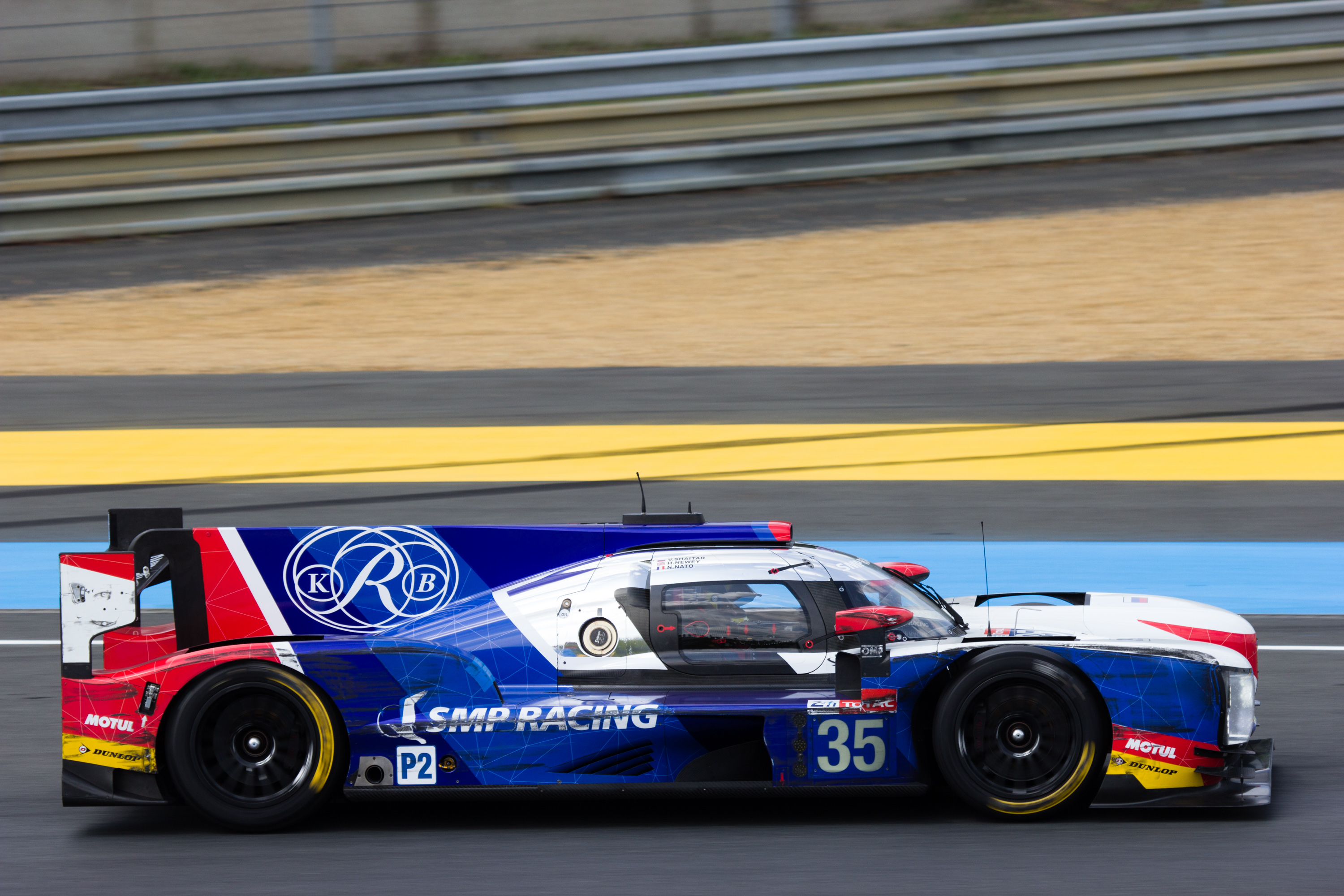
- Newey's SMP Dallara in 2018
- Nationality: (United Kingdom) British
- Born: Harrison William Innes Newey; 25 July 1998 (age 28) Oxford, Oxfordshire, England
- Relatives: Adrian Newey (father); Marigold Newey (mother)

WeatherTech SportsCar Championship career
- Debut season: 2020
- Current team: DragonSpeed USA
- Categorisation: FIA Silver
- Car number: 81
- Starts: 1
- Wins: 1
- Poles: 0
- Fastest laps: 0

Previous series
- 2015–16–17 2015 2015 2014 2016–17: MRF Challenge; BRDC Formula 4 Championship; ADAC Formula 4 French F4 Championship; FIA European Formula 3 Championship

Championship titles
- 2017–18 2016–17: Asian Le Mans Series; MRF Challenge

Harrison William Innes Newey (born 25 July 1998) is a British racing driver and the son of Formula One engineer Adrian Newey. He made his ADAC Formula 4 debut in 2015 with Van Amersfoort Racing. He also competed in the BRDC Formula 4 Championship alongside his ADAC F4 campaign and won the 2016-17 MRF Challenge Championship.

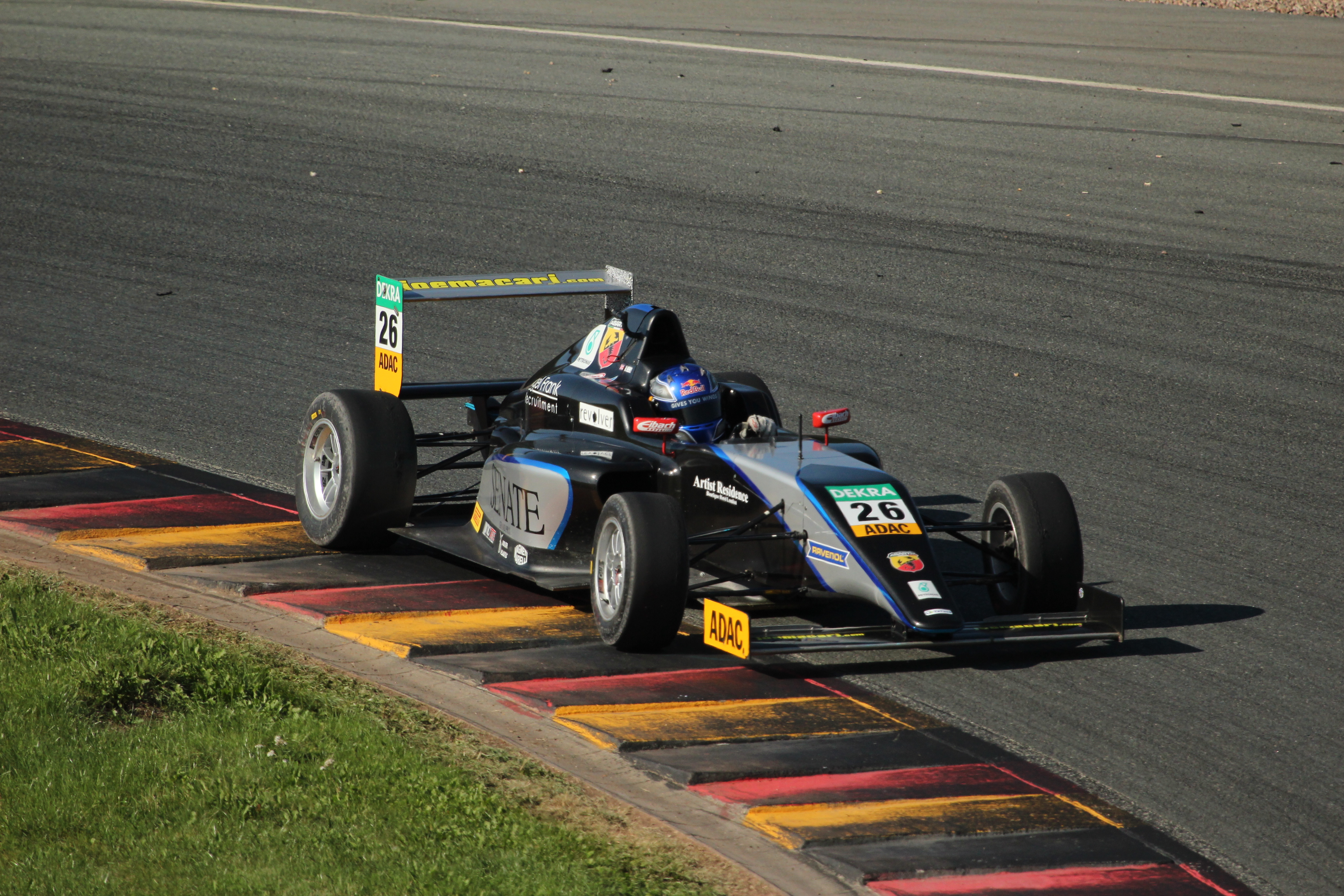
Newey racing in ADAC Formula 4 in 2015.

== Racing record ==
=== Career summary ===
Season	Series	Team	Races	Wins	Poles	FLaps	Podiums	Points	Position
2014	French F4 Championship	Auto Sport Academy	3	0	0	0	0	2	20th
2014	BRDC Formula 4 Winter Championship	HHC Motorsport	4	0	0	0	0	76	9th
2015	BRDC Formula 4 Championship	HHC Motorsport	24	2	2	3	12	455	**2nd**
2015	ADAC Formula 4 Championship	Van Amersfoort Racing	18	0	0	0	0	42	16th
2015	Remus Formel 4 - Formel 1800 Pokal	Van Amersfoort Racing	2	1	?	0	2	20	**3rd**
2015–16	MRF Challenge Formula 2000 Championship	MRF Racing	14	0	0	1	3	107	5th
2016	FIA Formula 3 European Championship	Van Amersfoort Racing	30	0	0	0	0	22	18th
2016–17	MRF Challenge Formula 2000 Championship	MRF Racing	16	7	5	6	9	277	**1st**
2017	FIA Formula 3 European Championship	Van Amersfoort Racing	30	0	0	0	0	106	11th
2017–18	Asian Le Mans Series - LMP2	Jackie Chan DC Racing X Jota	4	3	2	1	4	95	**1st**
2018	European Le Mans Series - LMP2	APR - Rebellion Racing	6	0	0	0	0	23.25	12th
2018	24 Hours of Le Mans - LMP2	SMP Racing	1	0	0	0	0	N/A	10th
2018–19	Asian Le Mans Series - LMP2	Algarve Pro Racing	4	2	1	1	3	69	**2nd**
2019	Super Formula	B-MAX with Motopark	7	0	0	0	1	6	15th
2019	Japanese Formula 3 Championship	B-MAX with Motopark	3	0	0	0	0	5	11th
2019	European Le Mans Series - LMP2	Thunderhead Carlin Racing	1	0	0	0	0	0	36th
2019	British GT Championship - GT4	Multimatic Motorsports	1	0	0	0	0	0	NC
2019	Super Taikyu - ST-X	Tairoku Racing	3	0	1	2	1	40‡	7th‡
2020	Deutsche Tourenwagen Masters	Audi Sport Team WRT	18	0	0	0	0	27	14th
2020	IMSA SportsCar Championship - LMP2	DragonSpeed USA	1	1	0	0	1	0	NC†
2020	European Le Mans Series - LMGTE	AF Corse	1	0	0	0	1	0	NC†
2022	SRO GT Anniversary	Red Bull JMB Racing							
2022	24 Hours of Le Mans - LMP2	Team Penske	Reserve driver						
2025	Middle East Trophy - GTX	Graff Racing							

^{†} As Newey was a guest driver, he was ineligible for points.
‡ Team standings.

=== Complete French F4 Championship results ===
(key) (Races in bold indicate pole position) (Races in italics indicate fastest lap)

Year	1	2	3	4	5	6	7	8	9	10	11	12	13	14	15	16	17	18	19	20	21	DC	Points
2014	LMS; 1	LMS; 2	LMS; 3	PAU; 1	PAU; 2	PAU; 3	VDV; 1	VDV; 2	VDV; 3	MAG; 1	MAG; 2	MAG; 3	NOG; 1	NOG; 2	NOG; 3	JER; 1	JER; 2	JER; 3	LEC; 1; 18	LEC; 2; 16	LEC; 3; 9	20th	2

=== Complete BRDC Formula 4 Championship results ===
(key) (Races in bold indicate pole position) (Races in italics indicate fastest lap)

Year	Team	1	2	3	4	5	6	7	8	9	10	11	12	13	14	15	16	17	18	19	20	21	22	23	24	DC	Points
2015	HHC Motorsport	OUL; 1; 2	OUL; 2; 6	OUL; 3; 9	**ROC**; **1** Ret	ROC; 2; 4	ROC; 3; 12	SIL; 1 Ret	SIL; 2; 6	SIL; 3; 2	SNE1; 1; 3	SNE1; 2; 15	SNE1; 3; 2	BRH1; 1; 4	BRH1; 2; 2	BRH1; 3; 11	SNE2; 1; 2	SNE2; 2; 2	SNE2; 3; 3	**DON**; **1**; 1	DON; 2; 7	DON; 3; 3	BRH2; 1; 8	BRH2; 2; 1	BRH2; 3; 2	2nd	455

=== Complete ADAC Formula 4 Championship results ===
(key) (Races in bold indicate pole position) (Races in italics indicate fastest lap)

Year	Team	1	2	3	4	5	6	7	8	9	10	11	12	13	14	15	16	17	18	19	20	21	22	23	24	DC	Points
2015	Van Amersfoort Racing	OSC; 1; 7	OSC; 2; 13	OSC; 3; 27	RBR; 1	RBR; 2	RBR; 3	SPA; 1 Ret	SPA; 2; 5	SPA; 3; 16	LAU; 1; 15	LAU; 2 Ret	LAU; 3; 10	NÜR; 1 Ret	NÜR; 2; 13	NÜR; 3; 18	SAC; 1; 6	SAC; 2; 10	SAC; 3; 11	OSC; 1	OSC; 2	OSC; 3	HOC; 1; 7	HOC; 2; 9	HOC; 3; 6	16th	42

=== Complete MRF Challenge Formula 2000 Championship results ===
(key) (Races in bold indicate pole position) (Races in italics indicate fastest lap)

Year	1	2	3	4	5	6	7	8	9	10	11	12	13	14	15	16	DC	Points
2015–16	ABU; 1; 10	ABU; 2; 7	ABU; 3; 7	ABU; 4; 16	BHR; 1; 7	BHR; 2; 4	DUB; 1; 7	DUB; 2 Ret	DUB; 3; 5	DUB; 4 DSQ	CHE; 1; 2	CHE; 2; 2	CHE; 3; 2	CHE; 4; 8			5th	107
2016–17	**BHR**; **1**; 1	BHR; 2; 4	**BHR**; **3** Ret	BHR; 4; 4	DUB; 1; 1	DUB; 2; 6	**DUB**; **3**; 1	DUB; 4 Ret	GNO; 1; 3	GNO; 2; 4	GNO; 3; 3	GNO; 4; 1	**CHE**; **1**; 1	CHE; 2; 4	**CHE**; **3**; 1	CHE; 4; 1	1st	277

=== Complete FIA Formula 3 European Championship results ===
(key) (Races in bold indicate pole position) (Races in italics indicate fastest lap)

Year	Entrant	Engine	1	2	3	4	5	6	7	8	9	10	11	12	13	14	15	16	17	18	19	20	21	22	23	24	25	26	27	28	29	30	DC	Points
2016	Van Amersfoort Racing	Mercedes	LEC; 1; 9	LEC; 2 Ret	LEC; 3; 14	HUN; 1; 12	HUN; 2; 12	HUN; 3; 10	PAU; 1; 15	PAU; 2 Ret	PAU; 3; 14	RBR; 1; 8	RBR; 2; 16	RBR; 3; 11	NOR; 1; 14	NOR; 2 Ret	NOR; 3; 10	ZAN; 1; 19	ZAN; 2; 12	ZAN; 3; 18	SPA; 1; 6	SPA; 2; 12	SPA; 3; 12	NÜR; 1; 14	NÜR; 2; 11	NÜR; 3; 11	IMO; 1; 9	IMO; 2; 8	IMO; 3 Ret	HOC; 1; 15	HOC; 2; 18	HOC; 3; 12	18th	22
2017	Van Amersfoort Racing	Mercedes	SIL; 1; 6	SIL; 2; 10	SIL; 3; 9	MNZ; 1; 17	MNZ; 2 Ret	MNZ; 3; 15	PAU; 1; 6	PAU; 2; 4	PAU; 3; 4	HUN; 1; 6	HUN; 2; 15	HUN; 3; 18	NOR; 1; 5	NOR; 2; 7	NOR; 3; 15	SPA; 1; 7	SPA; 2; 13	SPA; 3; 9	ZAN; 1; 10	ZAN; 2; 4	ZAN; 3; 7	NÜR; 1; 12	NÜR; 2; 8	NÜR; 3; 6	RBR; 1; 19	RBR; 2; 12	RBR; 3; 11	HOC; 1; 14	HOC; 2; 14	HOC; 3; 17	11th	106

=== Complete European Le Mans Series results ===
Year	Entrant	Class	Chassis	Engine	1	2	3	4	5	6	Rank	Points
2018	APR - Rebellion Racing	LMP2	Oreca 07	Gibson GK428 4.2 L V8	LEC; 15	MNZ; 8	RBR; 6	SIL; 5	SPA; 15‡	ALG; 12	12th	23.25
2019	Thunderhead Carlin Racing	LMP2	Dallara P217	Gibson GK428 4.2 L V8	LEC	MNZ	CAT	SIL; Ret	SPA	ALG	36th	0
2020	AF Corse	LMGTE	Ferrari 488 GTE Evo	Ferrari F154CB 3.9 L Turbo V8	LEC	SPA; 2	LEC	MNZ	ALG		NC†	0†

^{‡} Half points awarded as less than 75% of race distance was completed.
^{†} As Newey was a guest driver, he was ineligible for points.

=== 24 Hours of Le Mans results ===
Year	Team	Co-Drivers	Car	Class	Laps	Pos.	Class Pos.
2018	(Russia) SMP Racing	(Russia) Viktor Shaytar (France) Norman Nato	Dallara P217-Gibson	LMP2	345	14th	10th

=== Complete Super Formula results ===
(key) (Races in bold indicate pole position) (Races in italics indicate fastest lap)

Year	Team	Engine	1	2	3	4	5	6	7	DC	Points
2019	B-Max with Motopark	Honda	SUZ; Ret	AUT; 17	SUG; Ret	FUJ; 16	MOT; 19	OKA; 3	SUZ; 20	15th	6

=== Complete Japanese Formula 3 Championship results ===
(key) (Races in bold indicate pole position; races in italics indicate fastest lap)

Year	Team	Engine	1	2	3	4	5	6	7	8	9	10	11	12	13	14	15	16	17	18	19	20	DC	Pts
2019	B-Max Racing with Motopark	Volkswagen	SUZ; 1	SUZ; 2	AUT; 1	AUT; 2	AUT; 3	OKA; 1	OKA; 2	OKA; 3	SUG; 1	SUG; 2	FUJ; 1	FUJ; 2	SUG; 1; 5	SUG; 2; 6	SUG; 3; 5	MOT; 1	MOT; 2	MOT; 3	OKA; 1	OKA; 2	11th	5

=== Complete British GT Championship results ===
(key) (Races in bold indicate pole position) (Races in italics indicate fastest lap)

Year	Team	Car	Class	1	2	3	4	5	6	7	8	9	DC	Points
2019	Multimatic Motorsports	Ford Mustang GT4	GT4	OUL; 1	OUL; 2	SNE; 1	SNE; 2	SIL; 1; 27	DON; 1	SPA; 1	BRH; 1	DON; 1	NC	0

=== Complete IMSA WeatherTech SportsCar Championship results ===
(key) (Races in bold indicate pole position; races in italics indicate fastest lap)

Year	Entrant	Class	Make	Engine	1	2	3	4	5	6	7	Rank	Points
2020	DragonSpeed USA	LMP2	Oreca 07	Gibson GK428 4.2 L V8	DAY; 1	SEB	ELK	ATL	PET	LGA	SEB	NC†	0†

^{†} Points only counted towards the Michelin Endurance Cup, and not the overall LMP2 Championship.

=== Complete Deutsche Tourenwagen Masters results ===
(key) (Races in bold indicate pole position; races in italics indicate fastest lap)

Year	Entrant	Chassis	1	2	3	4	5	6	7	8	9	10	11	12	13	14	15	16	17	18	Rank	Points
2020	Audi Sport Team WRT	Audi RS5 Turbo DTM	SPA; 1; 13	SPA; 2 Ret	LAU; 1; 10	LAU; 2; 12	LAU; 1; 15	LAU; 2; 13	ASS; 1; 12	ASS; 2; 15	NÜR; 1; 14	NÜR; 2; 13	NÜR; 1; 11	NÜR; 2; 11	ZOL; 1; 5	ZOL; 2; 6	ZOL; 1; 7	ZOL; 2; 9	HOC; 1 Ret	HOC; 2; 13	14th	27

Sporting positions
Preceded by Pietro Fittipaldi	MRF Challenge Formula 2000 champion 2016–17	Succeeded by Felipe Drugovich
Preceded by Andrea Roda	Asian Le Mans Series; LMP2 Champion; 2017–18; With: Thomas Laurent & Stéphane Richelmi	Succeeded by Paul di Resta; Phil Hanson
