= 2016 European Le Mans Series =

Motor racing series

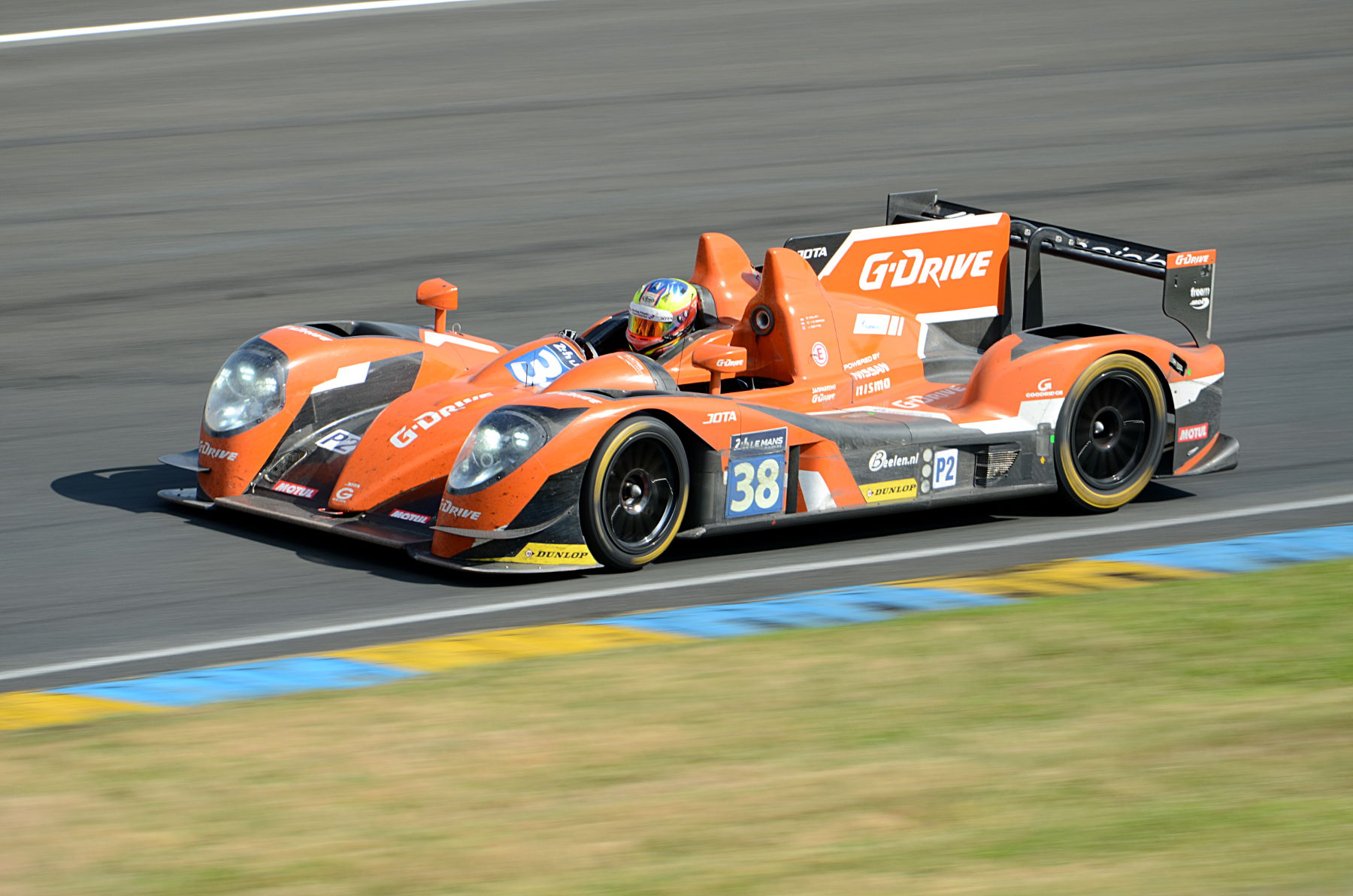
G-Drive Racing 'Mighty 38' No. 38 Gibson 015S, winner of the 2016 European Le Mans Series in the LMP2 class

The 2016 European Le Mans Series was the thirteenth season of the Automobile Club de l'Ouest's (ACO) European Le Mans Series. The six-event season began at Silverstone Circuit, in conjunction with the FIA World Endurance Championship, on 16 April and finished at Autódromo do Estoril on 23 October.

== Regulations ==
The GTC class for GT3 was dropped due to a lack of entries during 2015 and the creation of the GT3 Le Mans Cup.

== Calendar ==
The provisional 2016 calendar was announced at 5 September 2015. The calendar comprises six events, featuring the same five circuits that hosted events in 2015 and for the first time since 2011 it will include event at Spa. For the fourth consecutive season, Silverstone hosted the opening rounds of both the European Le Mans Series and the FIA World Endurance Championship. Meanwhile, the other rounds were collaboration with World Series by Renault.

Rnd	Race	Circuit	Location	Date
1	4 Hours of Silverstone	(United Kingdom) Silverstone Circuit	Silverstone, United Kingdom	16 April
2	4 Hours of Imola	(Italy) Autodromo Enzo e Dino Ferrari	Imola, Italy	15 May
3	4 Hours of Red Bull Ring	(Austria) Red Bull Ring	Spielberg, Austria	17 July
4	4 Hours of Le Castellet	(France) Circuit Paul Ricard	Le Castellet, France	28 August
5	4 Hours of Spa	(Belgium) Circuit de Spa-Francorchamps	Spa, Belgium	25 September
6	4 Hours of Estoril	(Portugal) Autódromo do Estoril	Estoril, Portugal	23 October

== Entry list ==
The entry list was announced on 5 February 2016.

=== LMP2 ===
Entrant/Team	Car	Engine	Tyre	No.	Drivers	Rounds
(United States) DragonSpeed	Oreca 05	Nissan VK45DE 4.5 L V8	D	21	(United Kingdom) Ben Hanley	All
(United States) DragonSpeed	Oreca 05	Nissan VK45DE 4.5 L V8	D	21	(Sweden) Henrik Hedman	All
(United States) DragonSpeed	Oreca 05	Nissan VK45DE 4.5 L V8	D	21	(France) Nicolas Lapierre	All
(France) SO24! By Lombard Racing	Ligier JS P2	Judd HK 3.6 L V8	D	22	(France) Vincent Capillaire	1–2
(France) SO24! By Lombard Racing	Ligier JS P2	Judd HK 3.6 L V8	D	22	(United Kingdom) Jonathan Coleman	1–2
(France) SO24! By Lombard Racing	Ligier JS P2	Judd HK 3.6 L V8	D	22	(France) Olivier Lombard	1–2
(France) Panis Barthez Competition	Ligier JS P2	Nissan VK45DE 4.5 L V8	M	23	(France) Fabien Barthez	All
(France) Panis Barthez Competition	Ligier JS P2	Nissan VK45DE 4.5 L V8	M	23	(France) Timothé Buret	All
(France) Panis Barthez Competition	Ligier JS P2	Nissan VK45DE 4.5 L V8	M	23	(France) Paul-Loup Chatin	All
(Portugal) Algarve Pro Racing	Ligier JS P2	Nissan VK45DE 4.5 L V8	D	25	(United Kingdom) Michael Munemann	1–3, 5
(Portugal) Algarve Pro Racing	Ligier JS P2	Nissan VK45DE 4.5 L V8	D	25	(India) Parth Ghorpade	1–2
(Portugal) Algarve Pro Racing	Ligier JS P2	Nissan VK45DE 4.5 L V8	D	25	(United Kingdom) Chris Hoy	1–2
(Portugal) Algarve Pro Racing	Ligier JS P2	Nissan VK45DE 4.5 L V8	D	25	(Switzerland) Jonathan Hirschi	3–5
(Portugal) Algarve Pro Racing	Ligier JS P2	Nissan VK45DE 4.5 L V8	D	25	(France) Andrea Pizzitola	3–5
(Portugal) Algarve Pro Racing	Ligier JS P2	Nissan VK45DE 4.5 L V8	D	25	(Italy) Andrea Roda	4
(France) IDEC Sport Racing	Ligier JS P2	Judd HK 3.6 L V8	M	28	(France) Dimitri Enjalbert	1–2, 4–6
(France) IDEC Sport Racing	Ligier JS P2	Judd HK 3.6 L V8	M	28	(France) Patrice Lafargue	1–2, 4–6
(France) IDEC Sport Racing	Ligier JS P2	Judd HK 3.6 L V8	M	28	(France) Paul Lafargue	1–2, 4–6
(Germany) Pegasus Racing	Morgan LMP2	Nissan VK45DE 4.5 L V8	M	29	(France) Léo Roussel	All
(Germany) Pegasus Racing	Morgan LMP2	Nissan VK45DE 4.5 L V8	M	29	(France) Inès Taittinger	All
(Germany) Pegasus Racing	Morgan LMP2	Nissan VK45DE 4.5 L V8	M	29	(France) Rémy Striebig	1–5
(Germany) Pegasus Racing	Morgan LMP2	Nissan VK45DE 4.5 L V8	M	29	(France) Julien Schell	6
(Russia) SMP Racing	BR Engineering BR01	Nissan VK45DE 4.5 L V8	D	32	(Monaco) Stefano Coletti	All
(Russia) SMP Racing	BR Engineering BR01	Nissan VK45DE 4.5 L V8	D	32	(Germany) Andreas Wirth	All
(Russia) SMP Racing	BR Engineering BR01	Nissan VK45DE 4.5 L V8	D	32	(Colombia) Julián Leal	1–4
(Russia) SMP Racing	BR Engineering BR01	Nissan VK45DE 4.5 L V8	D	32	(Russia) Vitaly Petrov	5–6
(Russia) SMP Racing	BR Engineering BR01	Nissan VK45DE 4.5 L V8	D	44	(New Zealand) Mitch Evans	1
(Russia) SMP Racing	BR Engineering BR01	Nissan VK45DE 4.5 L V8	D	44	(Indonesia) Sean Gelael	1
(Russia) SMP Racing	BR Engineering BR01	Nissan VK45DE 4.5 L V8	D	44	(Italy) Antonio Giovinazzi	1
(Philippines) Eurasia Motorsport	Oreca 05	Nissan VK45DE 4.5 L V8	D	33	(France) Tristan Gommendy	All
(Philippines) Eurasia Motorsport	Oreca 05	Nissan VK45DE 4.5 L V8	D	33	(Netherlands) Nick de Bruijn	1–5
(Philippines) Eurasia Motorsport	Oreca 05	Nissan VK45DE 4.5 L V8	D	33	(China) Pu Jun Jin	1–5
(Philippines) Eurasia Motorsport	Oreca 05	Nissan VK45DE 4.5 L V8	D	33	(United Kingdom) Michael Lyons	6
(Philippines) Eurasia Motorsport	Oreca 05	Nissan VK45DE 4.5 L V8	D	33	(Belgium) Frédéric Vervisch	6
(Switzerland) Race Performance	Oreca 03R	Judd HK 3.6 L V8	D	34	(Switzerland) Nicolas Leutwiler	1–2
(Switzerland) Race Performance	Oreca 03R	Judd HK 3.6 L V8	D	34	(United Kingdom) James Winslow	1–2
(Switzerland) Race Performance	Oreca 03R	Judd HK 3.6 L V8	D	34	(France) Franck Mailleux	1
(Switzerland) Race Performance	Oreca 03R	Judd HK 3.6 L V8	D	34	(Japan) Shinji Nakano	2
(Russia) G-Drive Racing	Gibson 015S	Nissan VK45DE 4.5 L V8	D	38	(United Kingdom) Simon Dolan	All
(Russia) G-Drive Racing	Gibson 015S	Nissan VK45DE 4.5 L V8	D	38	(Netherlands) Giedo van der Garde	All
(Russia) G-Drive Racing	Gibson 015S	Nissan VK45DE 4.5 L V8	D	38	(United Kingdom) Harry Tincknell	All
(United States) Krohn Racing	Ligier JS P2	Nissan VK45DE 4.5 L V8	M	40	(Sweden) Niclas Jönsson	All
(United States) Krohn Racing	Ligier JS P2	Nissan VK45DE 4.5 L V8	M	40	(Sweden) Björn Wirdheim	1–2
(United States) Krohn Racing	Ligier JS P2	Nissan VK45DE 4.5 L V8	M	40	(United States) Tracy Krohn	1, 3–5
(United States) Krohn Racing	Ligier JS P2	Nissan VK45DE 4.5 L V8	M	40	(France) Olivier Pla	2–6
(United Kingdom) Greaves Motorsport	Ligier JS P2	Nissan VK45DE 4.5 L V8	D	41	(France) Julien Canal	All
(United Kingdom) Greaves Motorsport	Ligier JS P2	Nissan VK45DE 4.5 L V8	D	41	(Mexico) Memo Rojas	All
(United Kingdom) Greaves Motorsport	Ligier JS P2	Nissan VK45DE 4.5 L V8	D	41	(Poland) Kuba Giermaziak	1–2
(United Kingdom) Greaves Motorsport	Ligier JS P2	Nissan VK45DE 4.5 L V8	D	41	(France) Nathanaël Berthon	3–6
(France) Thiriet by TDS Racing	Oreca 05	Nissan VK45DE 4.5 L V8	D	46	(Switzerland) Mathias Beche	All
(France) Thiriet by TDS Racing	Oreca 05	Nissan VK45DE 4.5 L V8	D	46	(France) Pierre Thiriet	All
(France) Thiriet by TDS Racing	Oreca 05	Nissan VK45DE 4.5 L V8	D	46	(Japan) Ryō Hirakawa	1–3, 5–6
(France) Thiriet by TDS Racing	Oreca 05	Nissan VK45DE 4.5 L V8	D	46	(United Kingdom) Mike Conway	4
(Belgium) Team WRT	Ligier JS P2	Judd HK 3.6 L V8	D	47	(United Kingdom) Will Stevens	5
(Belgium) Team WRT	Ligier JS P2	Judd HK 3.6 L V8	D	47	(Belgium) Dries Vanthoor	5
(Belgium) Team WRT	Ligier JS P2	Judd HK 3.6 L V8	D	47	(Belgium) Laurens Vanthoor	5
(Republic of Ireland) Murphy Prototypes	Oreca 03R	Nissan VK45DE 4.5 L V8	D	48	(Republic of Ireland) Sean Doyle	1–5
(Republic of Ireland) Murphy Prototypes	Oreca 03R	Nissan VK45DE 4.5 L V8	D	48	(United Kingdom) Shaun Balfe	1
(Republic of Ireland) Murphy Prototypes	Oreca 03R	Nissan VK45DE 4.5 L V8	D	48	(Republic of Ireland) Damien Faulkner	1
(Republic of Ireland) Murphy Prototypes	Oreca 03R	Nissan VK45DE 4.5 L V8	D	48	(United Kingdom) Gary Findlay	2, 5
(Republic of Ireland) Murphy Prototypes	Oreca 03R	Nissan VK45DE 4.5 L V8	D	48	(United Kingdom) Patrick McClughan	2
(Republic of Ireland) Murphy Prototypes	Oreca 03R	Nissan VK45DE 4.5 L V8	D	48	(Italy) Gugliemo Belotti	3
(Republic of Ireland) Murphy Prototypes	Oreca 03R	Nissan VK45DE 4.5 L V8	D	48	(India) Karun Chandhok	3
(Republic of Ireland) Murphy Prototypes	Oreca 03R	Nissan VK45DE 4.5 L V8	D	48	(Italy) Kevin Ceccon	4
(Republic of Ireland) Murphy Prototypes	Oreca 03R	Nissan VK45DE 4.5 L V8	D	48	(United Kingdom) Jonathan Coleman	4
(Republic of Ireland) Murphy Prototypes	Oreca 03R	Nissan VK45DE 4.5 L V8	D	48	(Brazil) Bruno Bonifacio	5

=== LMP3 ===
Entrant/Team	Car	Engine	Tyre	No.	Drivers	Rounds
(United States) United Autosports	Ligier JS P3	Nissan VK50VE 5.0 L V8	M	2	(United Kingdom) Alex Brundle	All
(United States) United Autosports	Ligier JS P3	Nissan VK50VE 5.0 L V8	M	2	(United Kingdom) Christian England	All
(United States) United Autosports	Ligier JS P3	Nissan VK50VE 5.0 L V8	M	2	(United States) Mike Guasch	All
(United States) United Autosports	Ligier JS P3	Nissan VK50VE 5.0 L V8	M	3	(United Kingdom) Matthew Bell	All
(United States) United Autosports	Ligier JS P3	Nissan VK50VE 5.0 L V8	M	3	(United Kingdom) Wayne Boyd	All
(United States) United Autosports	Ligier JS P3	Nissan VK50VE 5.0 L V8	M	3	(United States) Mark Patterson	All
(France) OAK Racing	Ligier JS P3	Nissan VK50VE 5.0 L V8	M	4	(France) Erik Maris	All
(France) OAK Racing	Ligier JS P3	Nissan VK50VE 5.0 L V8	M	4	(France) Jean-Marc Merlin	1–4, 6
(France) OAK Racing	Ligier JS P3	Nissan VK50VE 5.0 L V8	M	4	(Portugal) Carlos Tavares	5
(France) OAK Racing	Ligier JS P3	Nissan VK50VE 5.0 L V8	M	24	(France) Jacques Nicolet	All
(France) OAK Racing	Ligier JS P3	Nissan VK50VE 5.0 L V8	M	24	(France) Pierre Nicolet	All
(Spain) By Speed Factory	Ligier JS P3	Nissan VK50VE 5.0 L V8	M	5	(United Kingdom) Tom Jackson	1–4
(Spain) By Speed Factory	Ligier JS P3	Nissan VK50VE 5.0 L V8	M	5	(Spain) Álvaro Fontes	1–2
(Spain) By Speed Factory	Ligier JS P3	Nissan VK50VE 5.0 L V8	M	5	(Spain) Jesús Fuster	1–2
(Spain) By Speed Factory	Ligier JS P3	Nissan VK50VE 5.0 L V8	M	5	(Monaco) Alain Costa	3–4
(Spain) By Speed Factory	Ligier JS P3	Nissan VK50VE 5.0 L V8	M	5	(United Kingdom) John Hartshorne	4
(Spain) By Speed Factory	Ligier JS P3	Nissan VK50VE 5.0 L V8	M	5	(Republic of Ireland) Kevin O'Hara	5
(Spain) By Speed Factory	Ligier JS P3	Nissan VK50VE 5.0 L V8	M	5	(Republic of Ireland) Daniel Polley	5
(Spain) By Speed Factory	Ligier JS P3	Nissan VK50VE 5.0 L V8	M	5	(Denmark) Kim Rødkjær	5
(United Kingdom) 360 Racing	Ligier JS P3	Nissan VK50VE 5.0 L V8	M	6	(United Kingdom) Ross Kaiser	All
(United Kingdom) 360 Racing	Ligier JS P3	Nissan VK50VE 5.0 L V8	M	6	(United Kingdom) James Swift	All
(United Kingdom) 360 Racing	Ligier JS P3	Nissan VK50VE 5.0 L V8	M	6	(United Kingdom) Terrence Woodward	All
(Italy) Villorba Corse	Ligier JS P3	Nissan VK50VE 5.0 L V8	M	7	(Italy) Roberto Lacorte	All
(Italy) Villorba Corse	Ligier JS P3	Nissan VK50VE 5.0 L V8	M	7	(Italy) Giorgio Sernagiotto	All
(Italy) Villorba Corse	Ligier JS P3	Nissan VK50VE 5.0 L V8	M	7	(Italy) Niccolò Schirò	1–3
(Switzerland) Race Performance	Ligier JS P3	Nissan VK50VE 5.0 L V8	M	8	(Belgium) Bert Longin	All
(Switzerland) Race Performance	Ligier JS P3	Nissan VK50VE 5.0 L V8	M	8	(Switzerland) Giorgio Maggi	All
(Switzerland) Race Performance	Ligier JS P3	Nissan VK50VE 5.0 L V8	M	8	(Switzerland) Marcello Marateotto	1–5
(Switzerland) Race Performance	Ligier JS P3	Nissan VK50VE 5.0 L V8	M	8	(Switzerland) Nicolas Leutwiler	6
(France) Graff	Ligier JS P3	Nissan VK50VE 5.0 L V8	M	9	(France) Paul Petit	All
(France) Graff	Ligier JS P3	Nissan VK50VE 5.0 L V8	M	9	(France) Eric Trouillet	All
(France) Graff	Ligier JS P3	Nissan VK50VE 5.0 L V8	M	9	(France) Enzo Guibbert	1–2, 4–6
(France) Graff	Ligier JS P3	Nissan VK50VE 5.0 L V8	M	9	(United Kingdom) James Winslow	3
(France) Graff	Ligier JS P3	Nissan VK50VE 5.0 L V8	M	10	(United States) John Falb	All
(France) Graff	Ligier JS P3	Nissan VK50VE 5.0 L V8	M	10	(Venezuela) Enzo Potolicchio	All
(France) Graff	Ligier JS P3	Nissan VK50VE 5.0 L V8	M	10	(United States) Sean Rayhall	All
(United States) Eurointernational	Ligier JS P3	Nissan VK50VE 5.0 L V8	M	11	(Italy) Giorgio Mondini	1–4, 6
(United States) Eurointernational	Ligier JS P3	Nissan VK50VE 5.0 L V8	M	11	(Italy) Marco Jacoboni	1–4
(United States) Eurointernational	Ligier JS P3	Nissan VK50VE 5.0 L V8	M	11	(Italy) Andrea Roda	1–2
(United States) Eurointernational	Ligier JS P3	Nissan VK50VE 5.0 L V8	M	11	(United Kingdom) Jay Palmer	6
(United States) Eurointernational	Ligier JS P3	Nissan VK50VE 5.0 L V8	M	12	(Italy) Andrea Dromedari	2–4, 6
(United States) Eurointernational	Ligier JS P3	Nissan VK50VE 5.0 L V8	M	12	(Italy) Fabio Mancini	2–3
(United States) Eurointernational	Ligier JS P3	Nissan VK50VE 5.0 L V8	M	12	(Russia) Roman Rusinov	2–3
(United States) Eurointernational	Ligier JS P3	Nissan VK50VE 5.0 L V8	M	12	(Netherlands) Rik Breukers	4, 6
(United States) Eurointernational	Ligier JS P3	Nissan VK50VE 5.0 L V8	M	12	(Portugal) Miguel Faisca	6
(Poland) Inter Europol Competition	Ligier JS P3	Nissan VK50VE 5.0 L V8	M	13	(Germany) Jens Petersen	All
(Poland) Inter Europol Competition	Ligier JS P3	Nissan VK50VE 5.0 L V8	M	13	(Poland) Jakub Śmiechowski	All
(Republic of Ireland) MurphyP3-3Dimensional.com	Ginetta-Juno LMP3	Nissan VK50VE 5.0 L V8	M	14	(United States) Tony Ave	1
(Republic of Ireland) MurphyP3-3Dimensional.com	Ginetta-Juno LMP3	Nissan VK50VE 5.0 L V8	M	14	(Republic of Ireland) Michael Cullen	1
(Republic of Ireland) MurphyP3-3Dimensional.com	Ginetta-Juno LMP3	Nissan VK50VE 5.0 L V8	M	14	(United States) Doug Peterson	1
(Republic of Ireland) MurphyP3-3Dimensional.com	Ligier JS P3	Nissan VK50VE 5.0 L V8	M	14	(United Kingdom) Barrie Baxter	2
(Republic of Ireland) MurphyP3-3Dimensional.com	Ligier JS P3	Nissan VK50VE 5.0 L V8	M	14	(United Kingdom) Rob Garofall	2
(Republic of Ireland) MurphyP3-3Dimensional.com	Ligier JS P3	Nissan VK50VE 5.0 L V8	M	14	(United Kingdom) Alex Kapadia	2
(United Kingdom) RLR MSport	Ligier JS P3	Nissan VK50VE 5.0 L V8	M	15	(Denmark) Morten Dons	All
(United Kingdom) RLR MSport	Ligier JS P3	Nissan VK50VE 5.0 L V8	M	15	(United Kingdom) Ossy Yusuf	1–2
(United Kingdom) RLR MSport	Ligier JS P3	Nissan VK50VE 5.0 L V8	M	15	(United Kingdom) Ross Warburton	3–4
(United Kingdom) RLR MSport	Ligier JS P3	Nissan VK50VE 5.0 L V8	M	15	(United Kingdom) John Hartshorne	3
(United Kingdom) RLR MSport	Ligier JS P3	Nissan VK50VE 5.0 L V8	M	15	(United Kingdom) Anthony Wells	4–6
(United Kingdom) RLR MSport	Ligier JS P3	Nissan VK50VE 5.0 L V8	M	15	(United Kingdom) Alasdair McCaig	5–6
(France) Panis Barthez Competition	Ligier JS P3	Nissan VK50VE 5.0 L V8	M	16	(France) Eric Debard	All
(France) Panis Barthez Competition	Ligier JS P3	Nissan VK50VE 5.0 L V8	M	16	(France) Simon Gachet	All
(France) Panis Barthez Competition	Ligier JS P3	Nissan VK50VE 5.0 L V8	M	16	(France) Valentin Moineault	All
(France) Ultimate	Ligier JS P3	Nissan VK50VE 5.0 L V8	M	17	(France) François Hériau	All
(France) Ultimate	Ligier JS P3	Nissan VK50VE 5.0 L V8	M	17	(France) Jean-Baptiste Lahaye	All
(France) Ultimate	Ligier JS P3	Nissan VK50VE 5.0 L V8	M	17	(France) Matthieu Lahaye	All
(France) M.Racing - YMR	Ligier JS P3	Nissan VK50VE 5.0 L V8	M	18	(France) Alexandre Cougnaud	All
(France) M.Racing - YMR	Ligier JS P3	Nissan VK50VE 5.0 L V8	M	18	(France) Yann Ehrlacher	All
(France) M.Racing - YMR	Ligier JS P3	Nissan VK50VE 5.0 L V8	M	18	(France) Thomas Laurent	All
(France) Duqueine Engineering	Ligier JS P3	Nissan VK50VE 5.0 L V8	M	19	(France) David Hallyday	All
(France) Duqueine Engineering	Ligier JS P3	Nissan VK50VE 5.0 L V8	M	19	(France) Dino Lunardi	All
(France) Duqueine Engineering	Ligier JS P3	Nissan VK50VE 5.0 L V8	M	19	(Switzerland) David Droux	2–6
(France) Duqueine Engineering	Ligier JS P3	Nissan VK50VE 5.0 L V8	M	20	(France) Eric Clement	All
(France) Duqueine Engineering	Ligier JS P3	Nissan VK50VE 5.0 L V8	M	20	(France) Maxime Pialat	All
(France) Duqueine Engineering	Ligier JS P3	Nissan VK50VE 5.0 L V8	M	20	(France) Romain Iannetta	1–2
(France) Duqueine Engineering	Ligier JS P3	Nissan VK50VE 5.0 L V8	M	20	(Switzerland) Antonin Borga	3–6
(United Kingdom) Tockwith Motorsports	Ligier JS P3	Nissan VK50VE 5.0 L V8	M	26	(United Kingdom) Phil Hanson	4–5
(United Kingdom) Tockwith Motorsports	Ligier JS P3	Nissan VK50VE 5.0 L V8	M	26	(United Kingdom) Nigel Moore	4–5

=== GTE ===
Entrant/Team	Car	Engine	Tyre	No.	Drivers	Rounds
(Italy) AF Corse	Ferrari 458 Italia GT2	Ferrari F136 4.5 L V8	D	51	(Portugal) Rui Águas	All
(Italy) AF Corse	Ferrari 458 Italia GT2	Ferrari F136 4.5 L V8	D	51	(Italy) Marco Cioci	All
(Italy) AF Corse	Ferrari 458 Italia GT2	Ferrari F136 4.5 L V8	D	51	(Italy) Piergiuseppe Perazzini	All
(Italy) AF Corse	Ferrari 458 Italia GT2	Ferrari F136 4.5 L V8	D	55	(United Kingdom) Duncan Cameron	All
(Italy) AF Corse	Ferrari 458 Italia GT2	Ferrari F136 4.5 L V8	D	55	(Republic of Ireland) Matt Griffin	All
(Italy) AF Corse	Ferrari 458 Italia GT2	Ferrari F136 4.5 L V8	D	55	(United Kingdom) Aaron Scott	All
(Austria) AT Racing	Ferrari 458 Italia GT2	Ferrari F136 4.5 L V8	D	56	(Belarus) Alexander Talkanitsa, Jr.	All
(Austria) AT Racing	Ferrari 458 Italia GT2	Ferrari F136 4.5 L V8	D	56	(Belarus) Alexander Talkanitsa, Sr.	All
(Austria) AT Racing	Ferrari 458 Italia GT2	Ferrari F136 4.5 L V8	D	56	(Italy) Alessandro Pier Guidi	1, 3–6
(Austria) AT Racing	Ferrari 458 Italia GT2	Ferrari F136 4.5 L V8	D	56	(Italy) Davide Rigon	2
(Denmark) Formula Racing	Ferrari 458 Italia GT2	Ferrari F136 4.5 L V8	D	60	(Denmark) Johnny Laursen	All
(Denmark) Formula Racing	Ferrari 458 Italia GT2	Ferrari F136 4.5 L V8	D	60	(Denmark) Mikkel Mac	All
(Denmark) Formula Racing	Ferrari 458 Italia GT2	Ferrari F136 4.5 L V8	D	60	(Denmark) Christina Nielsen	1–3, 5–6
(Denmark) Formula Racing	Ferrari 458 Italia GT2	Ferrari F136 4.5 L V8	D	60	(Denmark) Mikkel Jensen	4
(United Kingdom) JMW Motorsport	Ferrari 458 Italia GT2	Ferrari F136 4.5 L V8	D	66	(Italy) Andrea Bertolini	All
(United Kingdom) JMW Motorsport	Ferrari 458 Italia GT2	Ferrari F136 4.5 L V8	D	66	(United Kingdom) Rory Butcher	All
(United Kingdom) JMW Motorsport	Ferrari 458 Italia GT2	Ferrari F136 4.5 L V8	D	66	(United Kingdom) Robert Smith	All
(Germany) Proton Competition	Porsche 911 RSR	Porsche M97/74 4.0 L Flat-6	D	77	(United States) Mike Hedlund	All
(Germany) Proton Competition	Porsche 911 RSR	Porsche M97/74 4.0 L Flat-6	D	77	(Germany) Wolf Henzler	All
(Germany) Proton Competition	Porsche 911 RSR	Porsche M97/74 4.0 L Flat-6	D	77	(Germany) Marco Seefried	1, 3–6
(Germany) Proton Competition	Porsche 911 RSR	Porsche M97/74 4.0 L Flat-6	D	77	(Germany) Robert Renauer	2
(Germany) Proton Competition	Porsche 911 RSR	Porsche M97/74 4.0 L Flat-6	D	88	(Germany) Christian Ried	All
(Germany) Proton Competition	Porsche 911 RSR	Porsche M97/74 4.0 L Flat-6	D	88	(Italy) Gianluca Roda	All
(Germany) Proton Competition	Porsche 911 RSR	Porsche M97/74 4.0 L Flat-6	D	88	(Austria) Richard Lietz	1
(Germany) Proton Competition	Porsche 911 RSR	Porsche M97/74 4.0 L Flat-6	D	88	(Austria) Klaus Bachler	2
(Germany) Proton Competition	Porsche 911 RSR	Porsche M97/74 4.0 L Flat-6	D	88	(Italy) Matteo Cairoli	3, 5
(Germany) Proton Competition	Porsche 911 RSR	Porsche M97/74 4.0 L Flat-6	D	88	(Germany) David Jahn	4
(Germany) Proton Competition	Porsche 911 RSR	Porsche M97/74 4.0 L Flat-6	D	88	(United Kingdom) Ben Barker	6
(United Kingdom) Aston Martin Racing	Aston Martin Vantage GTE	Aston Martin AM05 4.5 L V8	D	96	(Germany) Roald Goethe	1
(United Kingdom) Aston Martin Racing	Aston Martin Vantage GTE	Aston Martin AM05 4.5 L V8	D	96	(United Kingdom) Stuart Hall	1
(United Kingdom) Aston Martin Racing	Aston Martin Vantage GTE	Aston Martin AM05 4.5 L V8	D	96	(New Zealand) Richie Stanaway	1
(United Kingdom) Aston Martin Racing	Aston Martin Vantage GTE	Aston Martin AM05 4.5 L V8	D	99	(United Kingdom) Andrew Howard	All
(United Kingdom) Aston Martin Racing	Aston Martin Vantage GTE	Aston Martin AM05 4.5 L V8	D	99	(United Kingdom) Alex MacDowall	All
(United Kingdom) Aston Martin Racing	Aston Martin Vantage GTE	Aston Martin AM05 4.5 L V8	D	99	(United Kingdom) Darren Turner	All

=== Innovative car ===
Entrant/Team	Car	Engine	Tyre	No.	Drivers	Rounds
(France) SRT41 by OAK Racing	Morgan LMP2	Nissan VK45DE 4.5 L V8	M	84	(France) Jean-Bernard Bouvet	1
(France) SRT41 by OAK Racing	Morgan LMP2	Nissan VK45DE 4.5 L V8	M	84	(France) Frédéric Sausset	1
(France) SRT41 by OAK Racing	Morgan LMP2	Nissan VK45DE 4.5 L V8	M	84	(France) Christophe Tinseau	1

== Results and standings ==
=== Race results ===
Bold indicates overall winner.

Rnd.	Circuit	LMP2 Winning Team	LMP3 Winning Team	GTE Winning Team	Results
Rnd.	Circuit	LMP2 Winning Drivers	LMP3 Winning Drivers	GTE Winning Drivers	Results
1	Silverstone	(Russia) **No. 38 G-Drive Racing**	(United States) No. 2 United Autosports	(United Kingdom) No. 99 Aston Martin Racing	Report
1	Silverstone	(United Kingdom) **Simon Dolan** **(Netherlands) Giedo van der Garde** **(United Kingdom) Harry Tincknell**	(United Kingdom) Alex Brundle (United Kingdom) Christian England (United States) Mike Guasch	(United Kingdom) Andrew Howard (United Kingdom) Alex MacDowall (United Kingdom) Darren Turner	Report
2	Imola	(France) **No. 46 Thiriet by TDS Racing**	(United States) No. 2 United Autosports	(Germany) No. 77 Proton Competition	Report
2	Imola	**(Switzerland) Mathias Beche** **(Japan) Ryō Hirakawa** **(France) Pierre Thiriet**	(United Kingdom) Alex Brundle (United Kingdom) Christian England (United States) Mike Guasch	(United States) Mike Hedlund (Germany) Wolf Henzler (Germany) Robert Renauer	Report
3	Red Bull Ring	(France) **No. 46 Thiriet by TDS Racing**	(United States) No. 2 United Autosports	(United Kingdom) No. 66 JMW Motorsport	Report
3	Red Bull Ring	**(Switzerland) Mathias Beche** **(Japan) Ryō Hirakawa** **(France) Pierre Thiriet**	(United Kingdom) Alex Brundle (United Kingdom) Christian England (United States) Mike Guasch	(Italy) Andrea Bertolini (United Kingdom) Rory Butcher (United Kingdom) Robert Smith	Report
4	Paul Ricard	(France) **No. 46 Thiriet by TDS Racing**	(France) No. 9 Graff	(United Kingdom) No. 66 JMW Motorsport	Report
4	Paul Ricard	**(Switzerland) Mathias Beche** **(United Kingdom) Mike Conway** **(France) Pierre Thiriet**	(France) Enzo Guibbert (France) Paul Petit (France) Eric Trouillet	(Italy) Andrea Bertolini (United Kingdom) Rory Butcher (United Kingdom) Robert Smith	Report
5	Spa	**(United States) No. 21 DragonSpeed**	(France) No. 9 Graff	(United Kingdom) No. 66 JMW Motorsport	Report
5	Spa	**(United Kingdom) Ben Hanley** **(Sweden) Henrik Hedman** **(France) Nicolas Lapierre**	(France) Enzo Guibbert (France) Paul Petit (France) Eric Trouillet	(Italy) Andrea Bertolini (United Kingdom) Rory Butcher (United Kingdom) Robert Smith	Report
6	Estoril	(Russia) **No. 38 G-Drive Racing**	(France) No. 18 M.Racing - YMR	(United Kingdom) No. 99 Aston Martin Racing	Report
6	Estoril	(United Kingdom) **Simon Dolan** **(Netherlands) Giedo van der Garde** **(United Kingdom) Harry Tincknell**	(France) Alexandre Cougnaud (France) Yann Ehrlacher (France) Thomas Laurent	(United Kingdom) Andrew Howard (United Kingdom) Alex MacDowall (United Kingdom) Darren Turner	Report

To be classified a car will have to cross the finish line on the race track when the chequered flag is shown, except in a case of force majeure at the Stewards’ discretion and have covered at least 70% (the official number of laps will be rounded down to the nearest whole number) of the distance covered by the car classified in first place in the overall classification.

== Teams Championships ==
Points are awarded according to the following structure:

Position	**1st**	**2nd**	**3rd**	**4th**	**5th**	**6th**	**7th**	**8th**	**9th**	**10th**	Other	**Pole**
Points	25	18	15	12	10	8	6	4	2	1	0.5	1

=== LMP2 Teams Championship ===
Pos.	Team	Car	SIL (United Kingdom)	IMO (Italy)	RBR (Austria)	LEC (France)	SPA (Belgium)	EST (Portugal)	Total
1	(Russia) No. 38 G-Drive Racing	Gibson 015S	1	2	3	5	5	1	103
2	(France) No. 46 Thiriet by TDS Racing	Oreca 05	**Ret**	1	1	**1**	3	8	96
3	(Russia) No. 32 SMP Racing	BR Engineering BR01	2	4	4	2	6	3	83
4	(United States) No. 21 DragonSpeed	Oreca 05	Ret	**3**	Ret	3	**1**	**2**	76
5	(Philippines) No. 33 Eurasia Motorsport	Oreca 05	Ret	5	2	4	Ret	5	50
6	(United States) No. 40 Krohn Racing	Ligier JS P2	4	6	9	8	10	4	39
7	(United Kingdom) No. 41 Greaves Motorsport	Ligier JS P2	8	8	6	6	4	Ret	36
8	(France) No. 23 Panis Barthez Competition	Ligier JS P2	9	7	**7**	11	7	7	27.5
9	(Portugal) No. 25 Algarve Pro Racing	Ligier JS P2	10	Ret	5	7	9		19
10	(France) No. 28 IDEC Sport Racing	Ligier JS P2	7	Ret		10	8	6	19
11	(Belgium) No. 47 Team WRT	Ligier JS P2					2		18
12	(France) No. 22 SO24! By Lombard Racing	Ligier JS P2	3	11					15.5
13	(Russia) No. 44 SMP Racing	BR Engineering BR01	5						10
14	(Switzerland) No. 34 Race Performance	Oreca 03R	6	9					10
15	(Republic of Ireland) No. 48 Murphy Prototypes	Oreca 03R	11	10	8	9	Ret		7.5
16	(Germany) No. 29 Pegasus Racing	Morgan LMP2	Ret	12	Ret	12	Ret	EX	1

Key
Colour	Result
Gold	Race winner
Silver	2nd place
Bronze	3rd place
Green	Points finish
Blue	Non-points finish
Blue	Non-classified finish (NC)
Purple	Did not finish (Ret)
Black	Disqualified (DSQ)
Black	Excluded (EX)
White	Did not start (DNS)
White	Race cancelled (C)
White	Withdrew (WD)
Blank	Did not participate

**Bold** – Pole

=== LMP3 Teams Championship ===
Pos.	Team	Car	SIL (United Kingdom)	IMO (Italy)	RBR (Austria)	LEC (France)	SPA (Belgium)	EST (Portugal)	Total
1	(United States) No. 2 United Autosports	Ligier JS P3	1	1	1	3	2	**11**	109.5
2	(France) No. 9 Graff	Ligier JS P3	3	EX	4	1	**1**	3	93
3	(France) No. 19 Duqueine Engineering	Ligier JS P3	4	4	2	2	Ret	9	62
4	(United States) No. 3 United Autosports	Ligier JS P3	2	**7**	14	11	3	2	59
5	(United Kingdom) No. 6 360 Racing	Ligier JS P3	**5**	9	3	5	5	Ret	48
6	(France) No. 18 M.Racing - YMR	Ligier JS P3	Ret	5	10	Ret	Ret	1	36
7	(France) No. 16 Panis Barthez Competition	Ligier JS P3	7	3	**8**	8	11	Ret	30.5
8	(France) No. 17 Ultimate	Ligier JS P3	11	10	Ret	4	4	14	26
9	(France) No. 10 Graff	Ligier JS P3	13	Ret	7	Ret	7	4	24.5
10	(Poland) No. 13 Inter Europol Competition	Ligier JS P3	Ret	15	Ret	7	6	5	24.5
11	(Switzerland) No. 8 Race Performance	Ligier JS P3	6	13	6	Ret	Ret	7	22,5
12	(United States) No. 11 Eurointernational	Ligier JS P3	Ret	2	Ret	Ret		Ret	18
13	(United Kingdom) No. 15 RLR MSport	Ligier JS P3	8	6	15	Ret	8	10	17.5
14	(United States) No. 12 Eurointernational	Ligier JS P3		8	9	9		6	16
15	(France) No. 24 OAK Racing	Ligier JS P3	9	17	5	15	13	13	14
16	(United Kingdom) No. 26 Tockwith Motorsports	Ligier JS P3				**6**	12		9.5
17	(Italy) No. 7 Villorba Corse	Ligier JS P3	Ret	16	12	10	9	8	8
18	(France) No. 20 Duqueine Engineering	Ligier JS P3	10	11	11	13	10	Ret	3.5
19	(France) No. 4 OAK Racing	Ligier JS P3	12	14	16	12	14	12	3
20	(Spain) No. 5 By Speed Factory	Ligier JS P3	Ret	Ret	13	14	Ret		1
21	(Republic of Ireland) No. 14 MurphyP3-3Dimensional.com	Ginetta-Juno LMP3	Ret						0.5
21	(Republic of Ireland) No. 14 MurphyP3-3Dimensional.com	Ligier JS P3		12					0.5

Key
Colour	Result
Gold	Race winner
Silver	2nd place
Bronze	3rd place
Green	Points finish
Blue	Non-points finish
Blue	Non-classified finish (NC)
Purple	Did not finish (Ret)
Black	Disqualified (DSQ)
Black	Excluded (EX)
White	Did not start (DNS)
White	Race cancelled (C)
White	Withdrew (WD)
Blank	Did not participate

**Bold** – Pole

=== GTE Teams Championship ===
Pos.	Team	Car	SIL (United Kingdom)	IMO (Italy)	RBR (Austria)	LEC (France)	SPA (Belgium)	EST (Portugal)	Total
1	(United Kingdom) No. 99 Aston Martin Racing	Aston Martin Vantage GTE	1	5	4	**3**	5	1	98
2	(United Kingdom) No. 66 JMW Motorsport	Ferrari 458 Italia GT2	EX	2	1	1	1	Ret	93
3	(Austria) No. 56 AT Racing	Ferrari 458 Italia GT2	2	3	3	4	**Ret**	2	79
4	(Germany) No. 77 Proton Competition	Porsche 911 RSR	8	**1**	6	6	4	6	66
5	(Italy) No. 55 AF Corse	Ferrari 458 Italia GT2	4	6	8	5	3	3	64
6	(Germany) No. 88 Proton Competition	Porsche 911 RSR	6	4	**5**	Ret	2	**5**	60
7	(Italy) No. 51 AF Corse	Ferrari 458 Italia GT2	7	7	2	Ret	6	4	50
8	(Denmark) No. 60 Formula Racing	Ferrari 458 Italia GT2	5	DNS	7	2	7	Ret	40
9	(United Kingdom) No. 96 Aston Martin Racing	Aston Martin Vantage GTE	**3**						16

Key
Colour	Result
Gold	Race winner
Silver	2nd place
Bronze	3rd place
Green	Points finish
Blue	Non-points finish
Blue	Non-classified finish (NC)
Purple	Did not finish (Ret)
Black	Disqualified (DSQ)
Black	Excluded (EX)
White	Did not start (DNS)
White	Race cancelled (C)
White	Withdrew (WD)
Blank	Did not participate

**Bold** – Pole

== Drivers Championships ==
Points are awarded according to the following structure:

Position	**1st**	**2nd**	**3rd**	**4th**	**5th**	**6th**	**7th**	**8th**	**9th**	**10th**	Other	**Pole**
Points	25	18	15	12	10	8	6	4	2	1	0.5	1

=== LMP2 Drivers Championship ===
Pos.	Driver	Team	SIL (United Kingdom)	IMO (Italy)	RBR (Austria)	LEC (France)	SPA (Belgium)	EST (Portugal)	Total
1	(United Kingdom) Simon Dolan	(Russia) G-Drive Racing	1	2	3	5	5	1	103
1	(Netherlands) Giedo van der Garde	(Russia) G-Drive Racing	1	2	3	5	5	1	103
1	(United Kingdom) Harry Tincknell	(Russia) G-Drive Racing	1	2	3	5	5	1	103
2	(Switzerland) Mathias Beche	(France) Thiriet by TDS Racing	**Ret**	1	1	**1**	3	8	96
2	(France) Pierre Thiriet	(France) Thiriet by TDS Racing	**Ret**	1	1	**1**	3	8	96
3	(Monaco) Stefano Coletti	(Russia) SMP Racing	2	4	4	2	6	3	83
3	(Germany) Andreas Wirth	(Russia) SMP Racing	2	4	4	2	6	3	83
4	(United Kingdom) Ben Hanley	(United States) DragonSpeed	Ret	**3**	Ret	3	**1**	**2**	76
4	(Sweden) Henrik Hedman	(United States) DragonSpeed	Ret	**3**	Ret	3	**1**	**2**	76
4	(France) Nicolas Lapierre	(United States) DragonSpeed	Ret	**3**	Ret	3	**1**	**2**	76
5	(Japan) Ryō Hirakawa	(France) Thiriet by TDS Racing	**Ret**	1	1		3	8	70
6	(Colombia) Julián Leal	(Russia) SMP Racing	2	4	4	2			60
7	(France) Tristan Gommendy	(Philippines) Eurasia Motorsport	Ret	5	2	4	Ret	5	50
8	(Netherlands) Nick de Bruijn	(Philippines) Eurasia Motorsport	Ret	5	2	4	Ret		40
9	(Sweden) Niclas Jönsson	(United States) Krohn Racing	4	6	9	8	10	4	39
10	(France) Julien Canal	(United Kingdom) Greaves Motorsport	8	8	6	6	4	Ret	36
10	(Mexico) Memo Rojas	(United Kingdom) Greaves Motorsport	8	8	6	6	4	Ret	36
11	(China) Pu Jun Jin	(Philippines) Eurasia Motorsport	Ret	5	2	4	Ret		28
11	(France) Nathanaël Berthon	(United Kingdom) Greaves Motorsport			6	6	4	Ret	28
12	(France) Fabien Barthez	(France) Panis Barthez Competition	9	7	**7**	11	7	7	27.5
12	(France) Timothé Buret	(France) Panis Barthez Competition	9	7	**7**	11	7	7	27.5
12	(France) Paul-Loup Chatin	(France) Panis Barthez Competition	9	7	**7**	11	7	7	27.5
13	(France) Olivier Pla	(United States) Krohn Racing		6	9	8	10	4	27
14	(United Kingdom) Mike Conway	(France) Thiriet by TDS Racing				**1**			26
15	(Russia) Vitaly Petrov	(Russia) SMP Racing					6	3	23
16	(Sweden) Björn Wirdheim	(United States) Krohn Racing	4	6					20
17	(United States) Tracy Krohn	(United States) Krohn Racing	4		9	8	10		19
18	(France) Dimitri Enjalbert	(France) IDEC Sport Racing	7	Ret		10	8	6	19
18	(France) Patrice Lafargue	(France) IDEC Sport Racing	7	Ret		10	8	6	19
18	(France) Paul Lafargue	(France) IDEC Sport Racing	7	Ret		10	8	6	19
19	(United Kingdom) Will Stevens	(Belgium) Team WRT					2		18
19	(Belgium) Dries Vanthoor	(Belgium) Team WRT					2		18
19	(Belgium) Laurens Vanthoor	(Belgium) Team WRT					2		18
20	(Switzerland) Jonathan Hirschi	(Portugal) Algarve Pro Racing			5	7	9		18
20	(France) Andrea Pizzitola	(Portugal) Algarve Pro Racing			5	7	9		18

Key
Colour	Result
Gold	Race winner
Silver	2nd place
Bronze	3rd place
Green	Points finish
Blue	Non-points finish
Blue	Non-classified finish (NC)
Purple	Did not finish (Ret)
Black	Disqualified (DSQ)
Black	Excluded (EX)
White	Did not start (DNS)
White	Race cancelled (C)
White	Withdrew (WD)
Blank	Did not participate

**Bold** – Pole

=== LMP3 Drivers Championship ===
Pos.	Driver	Team	SIL (United Kingdom)	IMO (Italy)	RBR (Austria)	LEC (France)	SPA (Belgium)	EST (Portugal)	Total
1	(United Kingdom) Alex Brundle	(United States) United Autosports	1	1	1	3	2	**11**	109.5
1	(United Kingdom) Christian England	(United States) United Autosports	1	1	1	3	2	**11**	109.5
1	(United States) Mike Guasch	(United States) United Autosports	1	1	1	3	2	**11**	109.5
2	(France) Paul Petit	(France) Graff	3	Ret	4	1	**1**	3	93
2	(France) Eric Trouillet	(France) Graff	3	Ret	4	1	**1**	3	93
3	(France) Enzo Guibbert	(France) Graff	3	Ret		1	**1**	3	81
4	(France) David Hallyday	(France) Duqueine Engineering	4	4	2	2	Ret	9	62
4	(France) Dino Lunardi	(France) Duqueine Engineering	4	4	2	2	Ret	9	62
5	(United Kingdom) Matthew Bell	(United States) United Autosports	2	**7**	14	11	3	2	59
5	(United Kingdom) Wayne Boyd	(United States) United Autosports	2	**7**	14	11	3	2	59
5	(United States) Mark Patterson	(United States) United Autosports	2	**7**	14	11	3	2	59
6	(Switzerland) David Droux	(France) Duqueine Engineering		4	2	2	Ret	9	50
7	(United Kingdom) Ross Kaiser	(United Kingdom) 360 Racing	**5**	9	3	5	5	Ret	48
7	(United Kingdom) James Swift	(United Kingdom) 360 Racing	**5**	9	3	5	5	Ret	48
7	(United Kingdom) Terrence Woodward	(United Kingdom) 360 Racing	**5**	9	3	5	5	Ret	48
8	(France) Alexandre Cougnaud	(France) M.Racing - YMR	Ret	5	10	Ret	Ret	1	36
8	(France) Yann Ehrlacher	(France) M.Racing - YMR	Ret	5	10	Ret	Ret	1	36
8	(France) Thomas Laurent	(France) M.Racing - YMR	Ret	5	10	Ret	Ret	1	36
9	(France) Eric Debard	(France) Panis Barthez Competition	7	3	**8**	8		Ret	30.5
9	(France) Simon Gachet	(France) Panis Barthez Competition	7	3	**8**	8		Ret	30.5
9	(France) Valentin Moineault	(France) Panis Barthez Competition	7	3	**8**	8		Ret	30.5
10	(France) François Hériau	(France) Ultimate	11	10	Ret	4	4	14	26
10	(France) Jean-Baptiste Lahaye	(France) Ultimate	11	10	Ret	4	4	14	26
10	(France) Matthieu Lahaye	(France) Ultimate	11	10	Ret	4	4	14	26

Key
Colour	Result
Gold	Race winner
Silver	2nd place
Bronze	3rd place
Green	Points finish
Blue	Non-points finish
Blue	Non-classified finish (NC)
Purple	Did not finish (Ret)
Black	Disqualified (DSQ)
Black	Excluded (EX)
White	Did not start (DNS)
White	Race cancelled (C)
White	Withdrew (WD)
Blank	Did not participate

**Bold** – Pole

=== GTE Drivers Championship ===
Pos.	Driver	Team	SIL (United Kingdom)	IMO (Italy)	RBR (Austria)	LEC (France)	SPA (Belgium)	EST (Portugal)	Total
1	(United Kingdom) Andrew Howard	(United Kingdom) Aston Martin Racing	1	5	4	**3**	5	1	98
1	(United Kingdom) Alex MacDowall	(United Kingdom) Aston Martin Racing	1	5	4	**3**	5	1	98
1	(United Kingdom) Darren Turner	(United Kingdom) Aston Martin Racing	1	5	4	**3**	5	1	98
2	(Italy) Andrea Bertolini	(United Kingdom) JMW Motorsport	EX	2	1	1	1	Ret	93
2	(United Kingdom) Rory Butcher	(United Kingdom) JMW Motorsport	EX	2	1	1	1	Ret	93
2	(United Kingdom) Robert Smith	(United Kingdom) JMW Motorsport	EX	2	1	1	1	Ret	93
3	(Belarus) Alexander Talkanitsa Jr.	(Austria) AT Racing	2	3	3	4	**Ret**	2	79
3	(Belarus) Alexander Talkanitsa Sr.	(Austria) AT Racing	2	3	3	4	**Ret**	2	79
4	(United States) Mike Hedlund	(Germany) Proton Competition	8	**1**	6	6	4	6	66
4	(Germany) Wolf Henzler	(Germany) Proton Competition	8	**1**	6	6	4	6	66
5	(Italy) Alessandro Pier Guidi	(Austria) AT Racing	2		3	4	**Ret**	2	64
6	(United Kingdom) Duncan Cameron	(Italy) AF Corse	4	6	8	5	3	3	64
6	(Republic of Ireland) Matt Griffin	(Italy) AF Corse	4	6	8	5	3	3	64
6	(United Kingdom) Aaron Scott	(Italy) AF Corse	4	6	8	5	3	3	64
7	(Germany) Christian Ried	(Germany) Proton Competition	6	4	**5**	Ret	2	**5**	60
7	(Italy) Gianluca Roda	(Germany) Proton Competition	6	4	**5**	Ret	2	**5**	60
8	(Portugal) Rui Águas	(Italy) AF Corse	7	7	2	Ret	6	4	50
8	(Italy) Marco Cioci	(Italy) AF Corse	7	7	2	Ret	6	4	50
8	(Italy) Piergiuseppe Perazzini	(Italy) AF Corse	7	7	2	Ret	6	4	50
9	(Denmark) Johnny Laursen	(Denmark) Formula Racing	5	DNS	7	2	7	Ret	40
9	(Denmark) Mikkel Mac	(Denmark) Formula Racing	5	DNS	7	2	7	Ret	40
10	(Germany) Marco Seefried	(Germany) Proton Competition	8		6	6	4	6	40
11	(Italy) Matteo Cairoli	(Germany) Proton Competition			**5**		2		29
12	(Germany) Robert Renauer	(Germany) Proton Competition		**1**					26
13	(Denmark) Christina Nielsen	(Denmark) Formula Racing	5	DNS	7		7		22
14	(Denmark) Mikkel Jensen	(Denmark) Formula Racing				2			18
15	(Germany) Roald Goethe	(United Kingdom) Aston Martin Racing	**3**						16
15	(United Kingdom) Stuart Hall	(United Kingdom) Aston Martin Racing	**3**						16
15	(New Zealand) Richie Stanaway	(United Kingdom) Aston Martin Racing	**3**						16
16	(Italy) Davide Rigon	(Austria) AT Racing		3					15
17	(Austria) Klaus Bachler	(Germany) Proton Competition		4					12
18	(United Kingdom) Ben Barker	(Germany) Proton Competition						**5**	11
19	(Austria) Richard Lietz	(Germany) Proton Competition	6						8
20	(Germany) David Jahn	(Germany) Proton Competition				Ret			0

Key
Colour	Result
Gold	Race winner
Silver	2nd place
Bronze	3rd place
Green	Points finish
Blue	Non-points finish
Blue	Non-classified finish (NC)
Purple	Did not finish (Ret)
Black	Disqualified (DSQ)
Black	Excluded (EX)
White	Did not start (DNS)
White	Race cancelled (C)
White	Withdrew (WD)
Blank	Did not participate

**Bold** – Pole
