= 4 Hours of Silverstone =

Sports car endurance race in the United Kingdom

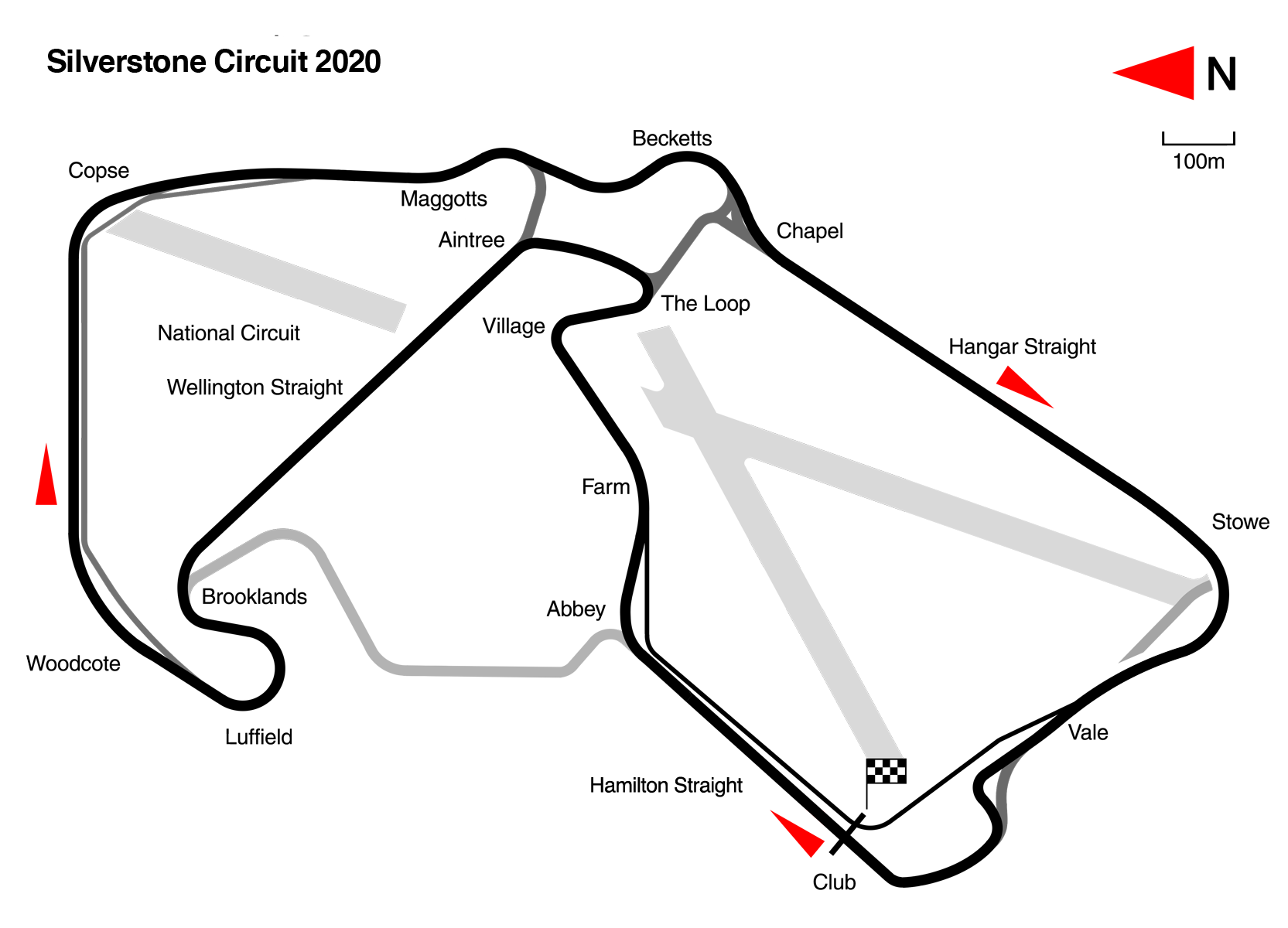

European Le Mans Series
- Venue: Silverstone Circuit
- First race: 2013
- First ELMS race: 2013
- Duration: 4 hours
- Previous names: 3 Hours of Silverstone
- Most wins (driver): (United Kingdom) Simon Dolan (2)
- Most wins (team): (Russia) G-Drive Racing (France) IDEC Sport (2)
- Most wins (manufacturer): (United Kingdom) Gibson Technology (France) Oreca (4)

The 4 Hours of Silverstone is an endurance race for sports cars, held at Silverstone Circuit, in the United Kingdom. The first race was held in 2013 as 3 Hours of Silverstone, as part of European Le Mans Series calendar. Since 2014, it is run in 4 hours format.

== Results ==
Year	Drivers	Team	Car	Laps (Distance)	Duration	Championship
2013	(United Kingdom) Simon Dolan (United Kingdom) Oliver Turvey	(United Kingdom) Jota Sport	Zytek Z11SN-Nissan	48 laps (282.77 km)	3 hours	European Le Mans Series
2014	(France) Ludovic Badey (France) Tristan Gommendy (France) Pierre Thiriet	(France) Thiriet by TDS Racing	Morgan LMP2-Nissan	118 laps (695.14 km)	4 hours	European Le Mans Series
2015	(Switzerland) Gary Hirsch (United Kingdom) Jon Lancaster (Sweden) Björn Wirdheim	(United Kingdom) Greaves Motorsport	Gibson 015S-Nissan	118 laps (695.14 km)	4 hours	European Le Mans Series
2016	(United Kingdom) Simon Dolan (Netherlands) Giedo van der Garde (United Kingdom) Harry Tincknell	(Russia) G-Drive Racing	Gibson 015S-Nissan	118 laps (695.14 km)	4 hours	European Le Mans Series
2017	(Portugal) Filipe Albuquerque (United States) William Owen (Switzerland) Hugo de Sadeleer	(United States) United Autosports	Ligier JS P217-Gibson	126 laps (742.27 km)	4 hours	European Le Mans Series
2018	(France) Andrea Pizzitola (Russia) Roman Rusinov (France) Jean-Éric Vergne	(Russia) G-Drive Racing	Oreca 07-Gibson	128 laps (754.05 km)	4 hours	European Le Mans Series
2019	(France) Paul-Loup Chatin (France) Paul Lafargue (Mexico) Memo Rojas	(France) IDEC Sport	Oreca 07-Gibson	118 laps (695.14 km)	4 hours	European Le Mans Series
2020 to 2024	No race					
2025	(United Kingdom) Jamie Chadwick (France) Mathys Jaubert (Spain) Daniel Juncadella	(France) IDEC Sport	Oreca 07-Gibson	104 laps (612.66 km)	4 hours	European Le Mans Series
2026	(United Kingdom) Jake Hughes (Liechtenstein) Matthias Kaiser (United Kingdom) Ben Barnicoat	(Portugal) Algarve Pro Racing	Oreca 07-Gibson	105 laps (618.55 km)	4 hours	European Le Mans Series
