= BR Engineering BR01 =

BR01
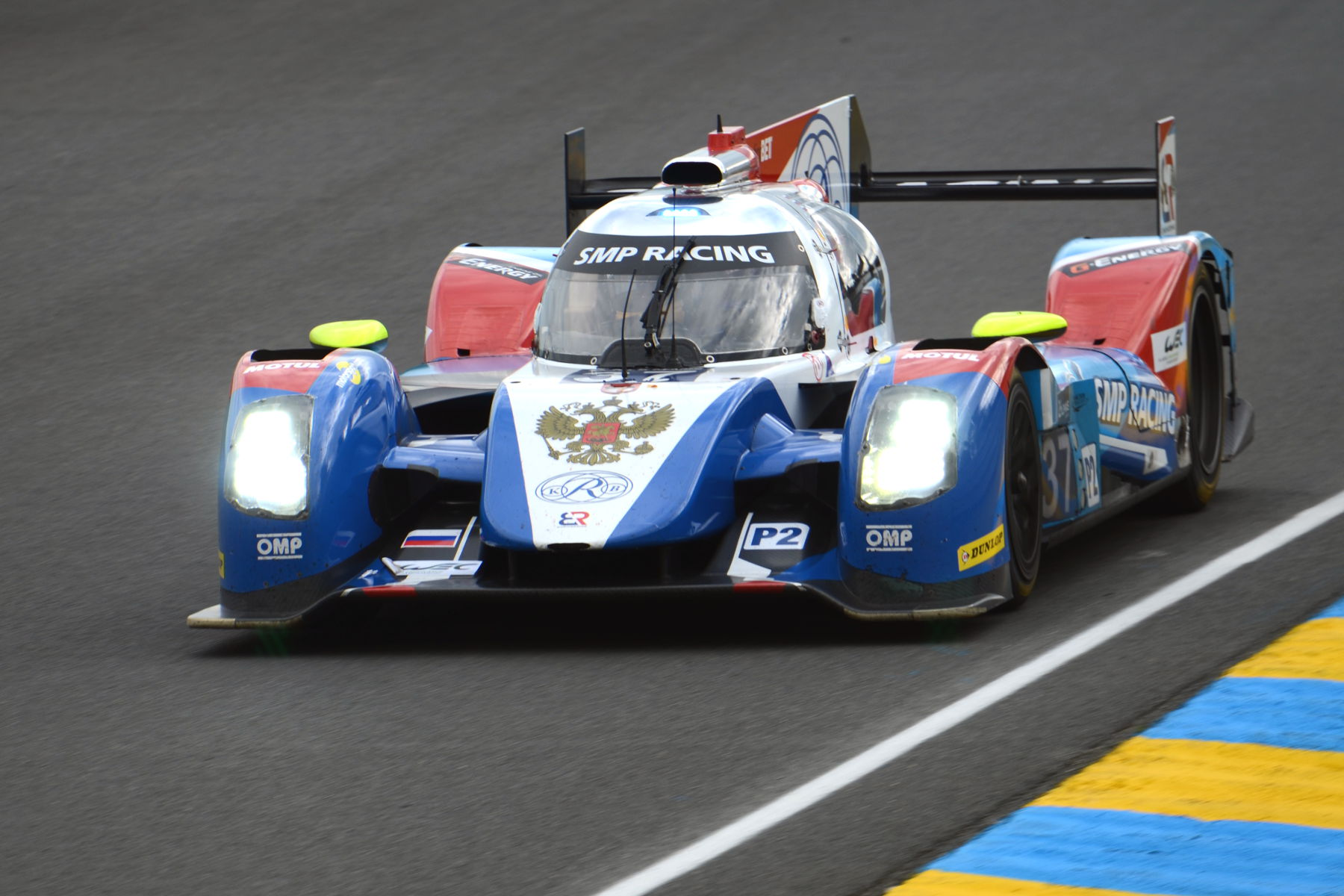
- The No. 37 BR01 that took third during the 2016 24 Hours of Le Mans
- Category: Le Mans Prototype (LMP2)
- Constructor: BR Engineering
- Designer: Paolo Catone

Technical specifications
- Chassis: Carbon fibre monocoque
- Engine: Nissan VK45DE 4.5 L V8 naturally aspirated mid-engined, longitudinally mounted
- Transmission: 6-speed Hewland sequential manual
- Weight: 900kg
- Tyres: Michelin, Dunlop, or Continental

Competition history
- Notable entrants: (Russia) SMP Racing
- Debut: 2015 4 Hours of Imola
- Last event: 2016 6 Hours of Bahrain
Races	Wins	Podiums	Poles	F/Laps
29	0	6	1	0

The BR Engineering BR01 is a Le Mans Prototype built by BR Engineering in 2015. The car made its debut at the 4 Hours of Imola run by SMP Racing.

== Racing history ==
=== 2015 ===
In 2015 SMP originally planned a full-season program in the European Le Mans Series. After missing the first round, in which the team ran the Oreca 03, the car with its livery was unveiled at Imola. SMP Racing entered a pair of BR01s at the 24 Hours of Le Mans and a single prototype at the 6 Hours of Bahrain.

=== 2016 ===
SMP Racing entered the 2016 24 Hours of Daytona, ahead of their planned 2-car assault on the 2016 FIA World Endurance Championship season in 2016. Mikhail Aleshin took pole position in a wet qualifying session however the car fell back during the race, eventually finishing 38th overall.

=== 2021 ===
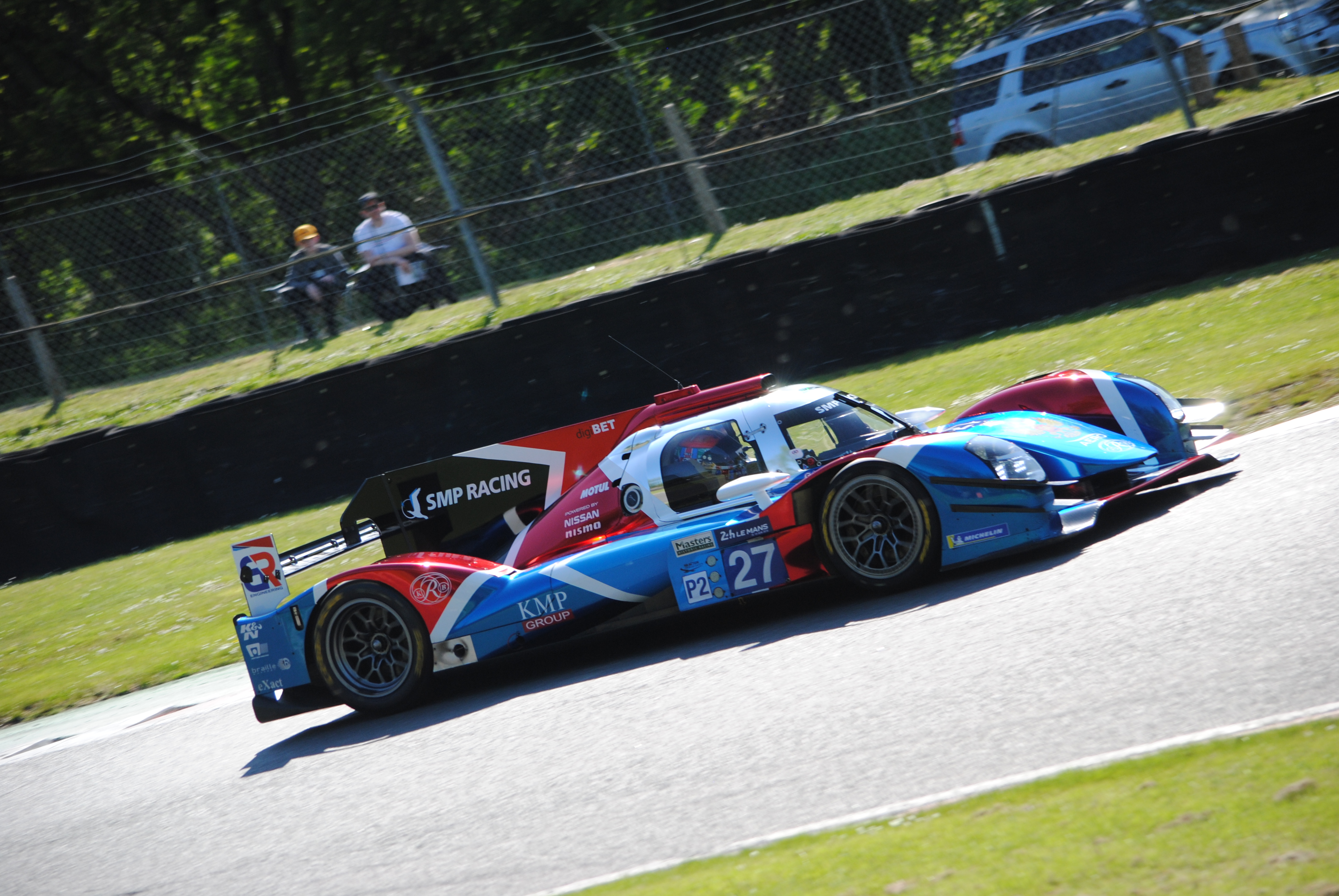
Shaun Lynn piloting the BR 01 at Brands Hatch.

Four of the BR 01s are being raced in the Masters Endurance Legends. The car has claimed six class wins in the G2/P2 class so far, as of 13 June, as well as six overall podiums finishes.

== Competition history ==
=== Complete European Le Mans Series results ===
(key) Races in bold indicates pole position. Races in italics indicates fastest lap.

Complete European Le Mans Series results
Year	Entrant	Class	Drivers	No.	Rds.	Rounds						Pts.	Pos.
Year	Entrant	Class	Drivers	No.	Rds.	1	2	3	4	5	6	0	NC
2015	(Russia) SMP Racing	LMP2	(Russia) David Markozov (Italy) Maurizio Mediani (France) Nicolas Minassian	27	2-3; 2-3; 2-3	SIL	IMO; Ret	RBR; Ret	LEC	EST		0	NC
2015	(Russia) SMP Racing	LMP2	(Russia) Mikhail Aleshin (Russia) Kirill Ladygin (Russia) Anton Ladygin	37	2-3; 2-3; 2-3	SIL	IMO; 8	RBR; 3	LEC	EST		19	9th
2015	(Russia) AF Racing	LMP2	(Russia) David Markozov (Italy) Maurizio Mediani (France) Nicolas Minassian	20	4-5; 4-5; 4-5	SIL	IMO	RBR	LEC; 4	EST; 5		22	8th
2015	(Russia) AF Racing	LMP2	(Russia) Mikhail Aleshin (Russia) Kirill Ladygin (Russia) Viktor Shaytar	21	4-5; 4-5; 4-5	SIL	IMO	RBR	LEC; 2	EST; 3		33	5th
2016	(Russia) SMP Racing	LMP2	(Monaco) Stefano Coletti (Germany) Andreas Wirth (Colombia) Julián Leal (Russia) Vitaly Petrov	32	All; All; 1-4; 5-6	SIL; 2	IMO; 4	RBR; 4	LEC; 2	SPA; 6	EST; 3	83	3rd
2016	(Russia) SMP Racing	LMP2	(New Zealand) Mitch Evans (Indonesia) Sean Gelael (Italy) Antonio Giovinazzi	44	1; 1; 1	SIL; 5	IMO	RBR	LEC	SPA	EST	10	13th

=== Complete World Endurance Championship results ===
(key) Races in bold indicates pole position. Races in italics indicates fastest lap.

Complete FIA World Endurance Championship results
Year	Entrant	Class	Drivers	No.	Rds.	Rounds									Pts.	Pos.
Year	Entrant	Class	Drivers	No.	Rds.	1	2	3	4	5	6	7	8	9	0	NC
2015	(Russia) SMP Racing	LMP2	(Italy) Maurizio Mediani (Russia) David Markozov (France) Nicolas Minassian	27	3; 3; 3	SIL	SPA	LMN; 6	NUR	COA	FUJ	SHA	BHR		0	NC
2015	(Russia) SMP Racing	LMP2	(Russia) Mikhail Aleshin (Russia) Kirill Ladygin (Russia) Anton Ladygin	37	3; 3; 3	SIL	SPA	LMN; 13	NUR	COA	FUJ	SHA	BHR		0	NC
2015	(Russia) AF Racing	LMP2	(France) Nicolas Minassian (Russia) Mikhail Aleshin (Russia) David Markozov	44	8; 8; 8	SIL	SPA	LMN	NUR	COA	FUJ	SHA	BHR; 5		0	NC
2016	(Russia) SMP Racing	LMP2	(Italy) Maurizio Mediani (France) Nicolas Minassian (Russia) David Markozov (Russia) Mikhail Aleshin	27	All; All; 2; 3, 7-9	SIL; 9	SPA; Ret	LMS; 7	NÜR; 8	MEX; 6	COA; 4	FUJ; 8	SHA; 6	BHR; 8	62	8th
2016	(Russia) SMP Racing	LMP2	(Russia) Vitaly Petrov (Russia) Viktor Shaytar (Russia) Kirill Ladygin	37	All; All; All	SIL; 7	SPA; 9	LMS; 3	NÜR; 6	MEX; Ret	COA; 6	FUJ; 10	SHA; 7	BHR; 7	71	6th

=== Complete IMSA SportsCar Championship results ===
(key) Races in bold indicates pole position. Races in italics indicates fastest lap. (key) Races in bold indicates pole position. Races in italics indicates fastest lap.

Year	Entrant	Class	Drivers	No.	Rds.	Rounds										Pts.	Pos.
Year	Entrant	Class	Drivers	No.	Rds.	1	2	3	4	5	6	7	8	9	10	Pts.	Pos.
2016	(Russia) SMP Racing	P	(Russia) Mikhail Aleshin (Russia) Kirill Ladygin (Italy) Maurizio Mediani (France) Nicolas Minassian	37	1; 1; 1; 1	**DAY**; **9**	SEB	LBH	LGA	DET	WGL	MOS	ELK	COA	PET	23	14th
