= 2016 4 Hours of Silverstone =

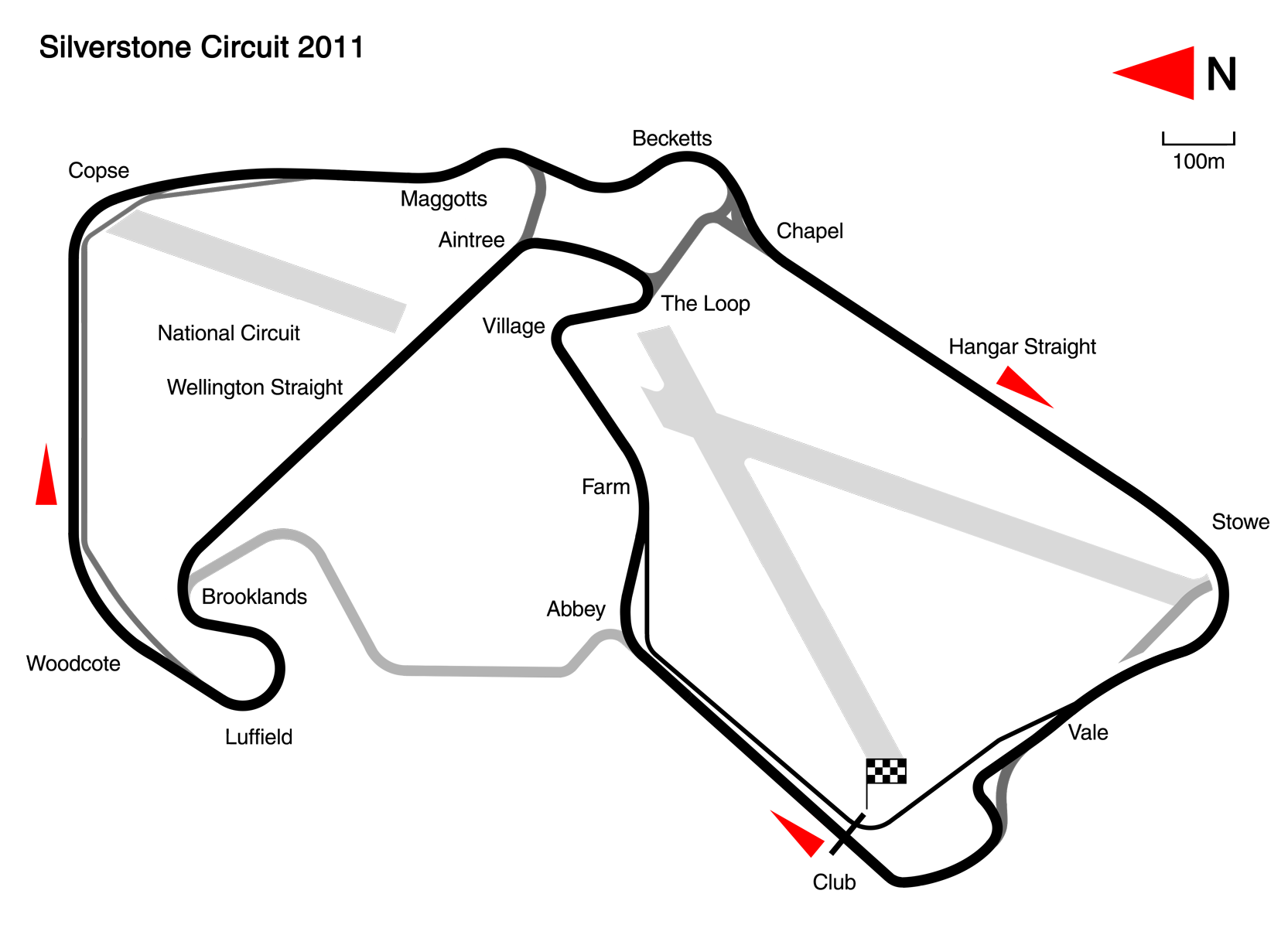
Layout of Silverstone Circuit

The 2016 4 Hours of Silverstone was an endurance motor race held at Silverstone Circuit in Silverstone, United Kingdom on 15–16 April 2016. It was the first round of the 2016 European Le Mans Series.

== Race ==
=== Race result ===
Class winners in bold.

Pos	Class	No.	Team	Drivers	Chassis	Tyre	Laps
Pos	Class	No.	Team	Drivers	Engine	Tyre	Laps
1	**LMP2**	**38**	**(Russia) G-Drive Racing**	**(United Kingdom) Simon Dolan** **(Netherlands) Giedo van der Garde** **(United Kingdom) Harry Tincknell**	**Gibson 015S**	D	**118**
1	**LMP2**	**38**	**(Russia) G-Drive Racing**	**(United Kingdom) Simon Dolan** **(Netherlands) Giedo van der Garde** **(United Kingdom) Harry Tincknell**	**Nissan VK45DE 4.5 L V8**	D	**118**
2	LMP2	32	(Russia) SMP Racing	(Monaco) Stefano Coletti (Germany) Andreas Wirth (Colombia) Julián Leal	BR Engineering BR01	D	118
2	LMP2	32	(Russia) SMP Racing	(Monaco) Stefano Coletti (Germany) Andreas Wirth (Colombia) Julián Leal	Nissan VK45DE 4.5 L V8	D	118
3	LMP2	22	(France) SO24! By Lombard Racing	(France) Vincent Capillaire (United Kingdom) Jonathan Coleman (France) Olivier Lombard	Ligier JS P2	D	117
3	LMP2	22	(France) SO24! By Lombard Racing	(France) Vincent Capillaire (United Kingdom) Jonathan Coleman (France) Olivier Lombard	Judd HK 3.6 L V8	D	117
4	LMP2	40	(United States) Krohn Racing	(Sweden) Björn Wirdheim (Sweden) Niclas Jönsson (United States) Tracy Krohn	Ligier JS P2	M	117
4	LMP2	40	(United States) Krohn Racing	(Sweden) Björn Wirdheim (Sweden) Niclas Jönsson (United States) Tracy Krohn	Nissan VK45DE 4.5 L V8	M	117
5	LMP2	44	(Russia) SMP Racing	(New Zealand) Mitch Evans (Indonesia) Sean Gelael (Italy) Antonio Giovinazzi	BR Engineering BR01	D	117
5	LMP2	44	(Russia) SMP Racing	(New Zealand) Mitch Evans (Indonesia) Sean Gelael (Italy) Antonio Giovinazzi	Nissan VK45DE 4.5 L V8	D	117
6	LMP2	34	(Switzerland) Race Performance	(Switzerland) Nicolas Leutwiler (United Kingdom) James Winslow (France) Franck Mailleux	Oreca 03R	D	116
6	LMP2	34	(Switzerland) Race Performance	(Switzerland) Nicolas Leutwiler (United Kingdom) James Winslow (France) Franck Mailleux	Judd HK 3.6 L V8	D	116
7	LMP2	28	(France) IDEC Sport Racing	(France) Dimitri Enjalbert (France) Patrice Lafargue (France) Paul Lafargue	Ligier JS P2	D	116
7	LMP2	28	(France) IDEC Sport Racing	(France) Dimitri Enjalbert (France) Patrice Lafargue (France) Paul Lafargue	Judd HK 3.6 L V8	D	116
8	LMP2	41	(United Kingdom) Greaves Motorsport	(France) Julien Canal (Mexico) Memo Rojas (Poland) Kuba Giermaziak	Ligier JS P2	D	115
8	LMP2	41	(United Kingdom) Greaves Motorsport	(France) Julien Canal (Mexico) Memo Rojas (Poland) Kuba Giermaziak	Nissan VK45DE 4.5 L V8	D	115
9	LMP2	23	(France) Panis Barthez Competition	(France) Fabien Barthez (France) Timothé Buret (France) Paul-Loup Chatin	Ligier JS P2	M	114
9	LMP2	23	(France) Panis Barthez Competition	(France) Fabien Barthez (France) Timothé Buret (France) Paul-Loup Chatin	Nissan VK45DE 4.5 L V8	M	114
10	LMP2	25	(Portugal) Algarve Pro Racing	(United Kingdom) Michael Munemann (India) Parth Ghorpade (United Kingdom) Chris Hoy	Ligier JS P2	D	114
10	LMP2	25	(Portugal) Algarve Pro Racing	(United Kingdom) Michael Munemann (India) Parth Ghorpade (United Kingdom) Chris Hoy	Nissan VK45DE 4.5 L V8	D	114
11	**LMP3**	**2**	**(United States) United Autosports**	**(United Kingdom) Alex Brundle** **(United Kingdom) Christian England** **(United States) Mike Guasch**	**Ligier JS P3**	M	**113**
11	**LMP3**	**2**	**(United States) United Autosports**	**(United Kingdom) Alex Brundle** **(United Kingdom) Christian England** **(United States) Mike Guasch**	**Nissan VK50 5.0 L V8**	M	**113**
12	LMP3	3	(United States) United Autosports	(United Kingdom) Matthew Bell (United Kingdom) Wayne Boyd (United States) Mark Patterson	Ligier JS P3	M	112
12	LMP3	3	(United States) United Autosports	(United Kingdom) Matthew Bell (United Kingdom) Wayne Boyd (United States) Mark Patterson	Nissan VK50 5.0 L V8	M	112
13	LMP3	9	(France) Graff	(France) Paul Petit (France) Enzo Guibbert (France) Eric Trouillet	Ligier JS P3	M	112
13	LMP3	9	(France) Graff	(France) Paul Petit (France) Enzo Guibbert (France) Eric Trouillet	Nissan VK50 5.0 L V8	M	112
14	LMP3	19	(France) Duqueine Engineering	(France) David Hallyday (France) Dino Lunardi	Ligier JS P3	M	112
14	LMP3	19	(France) Duqueine Engineering	(France) David Hallyday (France) Dino Lunardi	Nissan VK50 5.0 L V8	M	112
15	LMP2	48	(Republic of Ireland) Murphy Prototypes	(Republic of Ireland) Sean Doyle (United Kingdom) Shaun Balfe (Republic of Ireland) Damien Faulkner	Oreca 03R	D	112
15	LMP2	48	(Republic of Ireland) Murphy Prototypes	(Republic of Ireland) Sean Doyle (United Kingdom) Shaun Balfe (Republic of Ireland) Damien Faulkner	Nissan VK45DE 4.5 L V8	D	112
16	LMP3	6	(United Kingdom) 360 Racing	(United Kingdom) Ross Kaiser (United Kingdom) James Swift (United Kingdom) Terrence Woodward	Ligier JS P3	M	111
16	LMP3	6	(United Kingdom) 360 Racing	(United Kingdom) Ross Kaiser (United Kingdom) James Swift (United Kingdom) Terrence Woodward	Nissan VK50 5.0 L V8	M	111
17	LMP3	8	(Switzerland) Race Performance	(Belgium) Bert Longin (Switzerland) Giorgio Maggi (Switzerland) Marcello Marateotto	Ligier JS P3	M	110
17	LMP3	8	(Switzerland) Race Performance	(Belgium) Bert Longin (Switzerland) Giorgio Maggi (Switzerland) Marcello Marateotto	Nissan VK50 5.0 L V8	M	110
18	LMP3	16	(France) Panis Barthez Competition	(France) Eric Debard (France) Simon Gachet (France) Valentin Moineault	Ligier JS P3	M	110
18	LMP3	16	(France) Panis Barthez Competition	(France) Eric Debard (France) Simon Gachet (France) Valentin Moineault	Nissan VK50 5.0 L V8	M	110
19	LMP3	15	(United Kingdom) RLR MSport	(Denmark) Morten Dons (United Kingdom) Ossy Yusuf	Ligier JS P3	M	109
19	LMP3	15	(United Kingdom) RLR MSport	(Denmark) Morten Dons (United Kingdom) Ossy Yusuf	Nissan VK50 5.0 L V8	M	109
20	**LMGTE**	**99**	**(United Kingdom) Aston Martin Racing**	**(United Kingdom) Andrew Howard** **(United Kingdom) Alex MacDowall** **(United Kingdom) Darren Turner**	**Aston Martin Vantage GTE**	D	**109**
20	**LMGTE**	**99**	**(United Kingdom) Aston Martin Racing**	**(United Kingdom) Andrew Howard** **(United Kingdom) Alex MacDowall** **(United Kingdom) Darren Turner**	**Aston Martin 4.5 L V8**	D	**109**
21	LMGTE	56	(Austria) AT Racing	(Belarus) Alexander Talkanitsa, Jr. (Belarus) Alexander Talkanitsa, Sr. (Italy) Alessandro Pier Guidi	Ferrari 458 Italia GT2	D	109
21	LMGTE	56	(Austria) AT Racing	(Belarus) Alexander Talkanitsa, Jr. (Belarus) Alexander Talkanitsa, Sr. (Italy) Alessandro Pier Guidi	Ferrari 4.5 L V8	D	109
22	LMGTE	96	(United Kingdom) Aston Martin Racing	(Germany) Roald Goethe (United Kingdom) Stuart Hall (New Zealand) Richie Stanaway	Aston Martin Vantage GTE	D	109
22	LMGTE	96	(United Kingdom) Aston Martin Racing	(Germany) Roald Goethe (United Kingdom) Stuart Hall (New Zealand) Richie Stanaway	Aston Martin 4.5 L V8	D	109
23	LMP3	24	(France) OAK Racing	(France) Jacques Nicolet (France) Pierre Nicolet	Ligier JS P3	M	108
23	LMP3	24	(France) OAK Racing	(France) Jacques Nicolet (France) Pierre Nicolet	Nissan VK50 5.0 L V8	M	108
24	LMGTE	55	(Italy) AF Corse	(United Kingdom) Duncan Cameron (Republic of Ireland) Matt Griffin (United Kingdom) Aaron Scott	Ferrari 458 Italia GT2	D	108
24	LMGTE	55	(Italy) AF Corse	(United Kingdom) Duncan Cameron (Republic of Ireland) Matt Griffin (United Kingdom) Aaron Scott	Ferrari 4.5 L V8	D	108
25	LMP3	20	(France) Duqueine Engineering	(France) Eric Clement (France) Maxime Pialat (France) Romain Iannetta	Ligier JS P3	M	108
25	LMP3	20	(France) Duqueine Engineering	(France) Eric Clement (France) Maxime Pialat (France) Romain Iannetta	Nissan VK50 5.0 L V8	M	108
26	LMGTE	60	(Denmark) Formula Racing	(Denmark) Johnny Laursen (Denmark) Mikkel Mac (Denmark) Christina Nielsen	Ferrari 458 Italia GT2	D	108
26	LMGTE	60	(Denmark) Formula Racing	(Denmark) Johnny Laursen (Denmark) Mikkel Mac (Denmark) Christina Nielsen	Ferrari 4.5 L V8	D	108
27	LMGTE	88	(Germany) Proton Competition	(Germany) Christian Ried (Austria) Richard Lietz (Italy) Gianluca Roda	Porsche 911 RSR	D	108
27	LMGTE	88	(Germany) Proton Competition	(Germany) Christian Ried (Austria) Richard Lietz (Italy) Gianluca Roda	Porsche 4.0 L Flat-6	D	108
28	LMGTE	51	(Italy) AF Corse	(Portugal) Rui Águas (Italy) Marco Cioci (Italy) Piergiuseppe Perazzini	Ferrari 458 Italia GT2	D	108
28	LMGTE	51	(Italy) AF Corse	(Portugal) Rui Águas (Italy) Marco Cioci (Italy) Piergiuseppe Perazzini	Ferrari 4.5 L V8	D	108
29	LMP3	17	(France) Ultimate	(France) François Hériau (France) Jean-Baptiste Lahaye (France) Matthieu Lahaye	Ligier JS P3	M	107
29	LMP3	17	(France) Ultimate	(France) François Hériau (France) Jean-Baptiste Lahaye (France) Matthieu Lahaye	Nissan VK50 5.0 L V8	M	107
30	LMGTE	77	(Germany) Proton Competition	(United States) Mike Hedlund (Germany) Wolf Henzler (Germany) Marco Seefried	Porsche 911 RSR	D	107
30	LMGTE	77	(Germany) Proton Competition	(United States) Mike Hedlund (Germany) Wolf Henzler (Germany) Marco Seefried	Porsche 4.0 L Flat-6	D	107
31	INNOV	84	(France) SRT41 by OAK Racing	(France) Jean-Bernard Bouvet (France) Frédéric Sausset (France) Christophe Tinseau	Morgan LMP2	M	106
31	INNOV	84	(France) SRT41 by OAK Racing	(France) Jean-Bernard Bouvet (France) Frédéric Sausset (France) Christophe Tinseau	Nissan VK45DE 4.5 L V8	M	106
32	LMP3	4	(France) OAK Racing	(France) Erik Maris (France) Jean-Marc Merlin	Ligier JS P3	M	105
32	LMP3	4	(France) OAK Racing	(France) Erik Maris (France) Jean-Marc Merlin	Nissan VK50 5.0 L V8	M	105
33	LMP3	10	(France) Graff	(United States) John Falb (Venezuela) Enzo Potolicchio (United States) Sean Rayhall	Ligier JS P3	M	100
33	LMP3	10	(France) Graff	(United States) John Falb (Venezuela) Enzo Potolicchio (United States) Sean Rayhall	Nissan VK50 5.0 L V8	M	100
DNF	LMP3	13	(Poland) Inter Europol Competition	(Germany) Jens Petersen (Poland) Jakub Śmiechowski	Ligier JS P3	M	107
DNF	LMP3	13	(Poland) Inter Europol Competition	(Germany) Jens Petersen (Poland) Jakub Śmiechowski	Nissan VK50 5.0 L V8	M	107
DNF	LMP3	11	(United States) Eurointernational	(Italy) Giorgio Mondini (Italy) Marco Jacoboni (Italy) Andrea Roda	Ligier JS P3	M	97
DNF	LMP3	11	(United States) Eurointernational	(Italy) Giorgio Mondini (Italy) Marco Jacoboni (Italy) Andrea Roda	Nissan VK50 5.0 L V8	M	97
DNF	LMP2	29	(Germany) Pegasus Racing	(France) Léo Roussel (France) Inès Taittinger (France) Rémy Striebig	Morgan LMP2	M	90
DNF	LMP2	29	(Germany) Pegasus Racing	(France) Léo Roussel (France) Inès Taittinger (France) Rémy Striebig	Nissan VK45DE 4.5 L V8	M	90
DNF	LMP2	21	(United States) DragonSpeed	(United Kingdom) Ben Hanley (Sweden) Henrik Hedman (France) Nicolas Lapierre	Oreca 05	D	63
DNF	LMP2	21	(United States) DragonSpeed	(United Kingdom) Ben Hanley (Sweden) Henrik Hedman (France) Nicolas Lapierre	Nissan VK45DE 4.5 L V8	D	63
DNF	LMP3	14	(Republic of Ireland) MurphyP3-3Dimensional.com	(United States) Tony Ave (Republic of Ireland) Michael Cullen (United States) Doug Peterson	Ginetta-Juno LMP3	M	29
DNF	LMP3	14	(Republic of Ireland) MurphyP3-3Dimensional.com	(United States) Tony Ave (Republic of Ireland) Michael Cullen (United States) Doug Peterson	Nissan VK50 5.0 L V8	M	29
DNF	LMP3	18	(France) M.Racing - YMR	(France) Alexandre Cougnaud (France) Yann Ehrlacher (France) Thomas Laurent	Ligier JS P3	M	23
DNF	LMP3	18	(France) M.Racing - YMR	(France) Alexandre Cougnaud (France) Yann Ehrlacher (France) Thomas Laurent	Nissan VK50 5.0 L V8	M	23
DNF	LMP3	5	(Spain) By Speed Factory	(United Kingdom) Tom Jackson (Spain) Álvaro Fontes (Spain) Jesús Fuster	Ligier JS P3	M	22
DNF	LMP3	5	(Spain) By Speed Factory	(United Kingdom) Tom Jackson (Spain) Álvaro Fontes (Spain) Jesús Fuster	Nissan VK50 5.0 L V8	M	22
DNF	LMP3	7	(Italy) Villorba Corse	(Italy) Roberto Lacorte (Italy) Giorgio Sernagiotto (Italy) Niccolò Schirò	Ligier JS P3	M	19
DNF	LMP3	7	(Italy) Villorba Corse	(Italy) Roberto Lacorte (Italy) Giorgio Sernagiotto (Italy) Niccolò Schirò	Nissan VK50 5.0 L V8	M	19
DNF	LMP2	33	(Philippines) Eurasia Motorsport	(France) Tristan Gommendy (Netherlands) Nick de Bruijn (China) Pu Jun Jin	Oreca 05	D	11
DNF	LMP2	33	(Philippines) Eurasia Motorsport	(France) Tristan Gommendy (Netherlands) Nick de Bruijn (China) Pu Jun Jin	Nissan VK45DE 4.5 L V8	D	11
DNF	LMP2	46	(France) Thiriet by TDS Racing	(Switzerland) Mathias Beche (France) Pierre Thiriet (Japan) Ryō Hirakawa	Oreca 05	D	11
DNF	LMP2	46	(France) Thiriet by TDS Racing	(Switzerland) Mathias Beche (France) Pierre Thiriet (Japan) Ryō Hirakawa	Nissan VK45DE 4.5 L V8	D	11
EX	LMGTE	66	(United Kingdom) JMW Motorsport	(Italy) Andrea Bertolini (United Kingdom) Robert Smith (United Kingdom) Rory Butcher	Ferrari 458 Italia GT2	D	110
EX	LMGTE	66	(United Kingdom) JMW Motorsport	(Italy) Andrea Bertolini (United Kingdom) Robert Smith (United Kingdom) Rory Butcher	Ferrari 4.5 L V8	D	110

European Le Mans Series
Previous race: none	2016 season	Next race: Imola
