= Oreca 05 =

LMP2 racing car

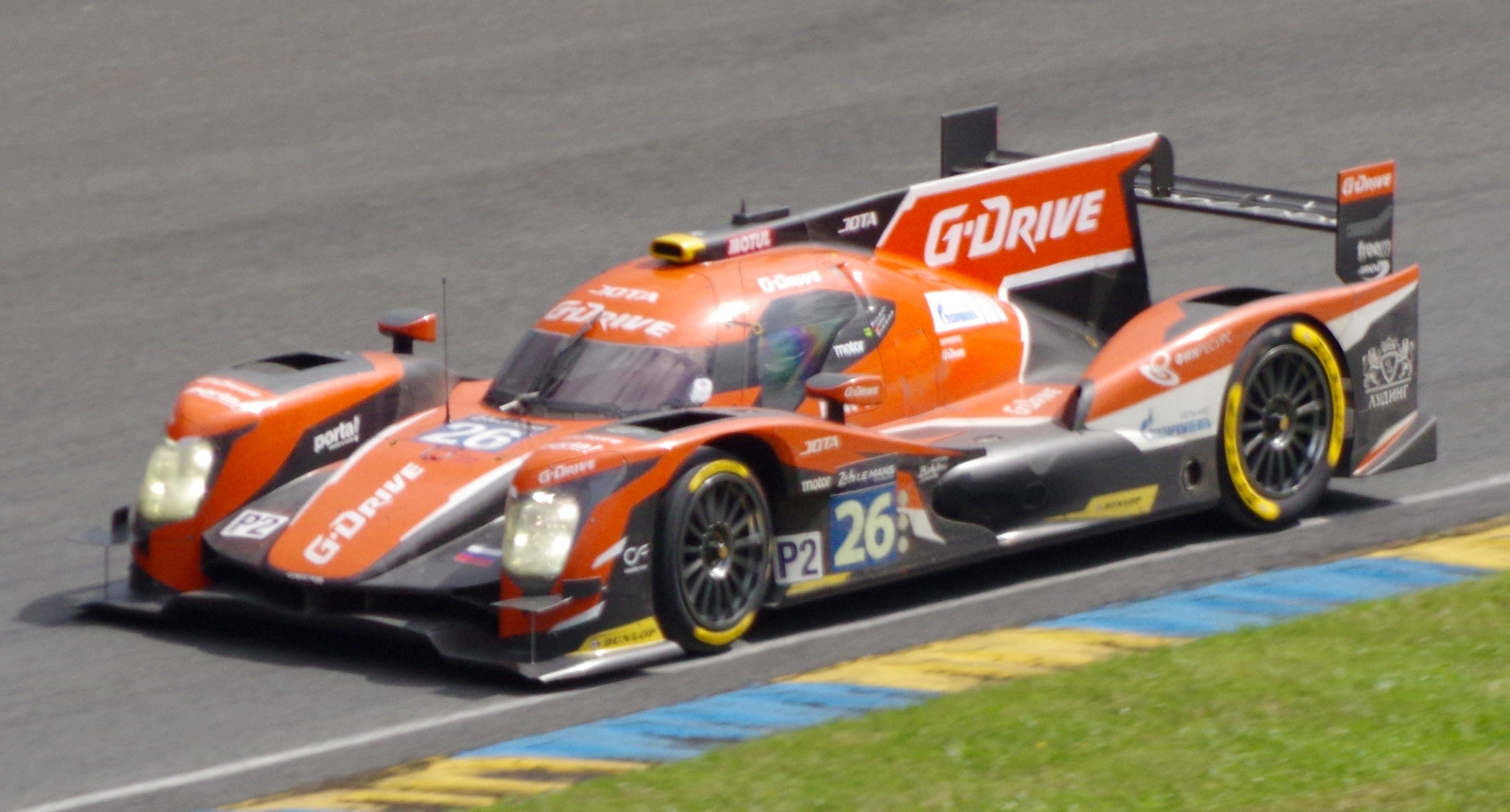
- The No. 26 Oreca 05 of G-Drive Racing during the 2016 24 Hours of Le Mans
- Category: Le Mans Prototype 2 (LMP2)
- Constructor: Oreca
- Designer: David Floury
- Predecessor: Oreca 03
- Successor: Oreca 07

Technical specifications
- Chassis: Carbon fibre monocoque
- Suspension (front): Double Wishbone Push Rod
- Suspension (rear): Double Wishbone Push Rod
- Length: 4,640 mm (182.7 in)
- Width: 1,900 mm (74.8 in)
- Height: 1,045 mm (41.1 in)
- Axle track: front 1,570 mm (61.8 in) rear 1,550 mm (61.0 in)
- Engine: Nissan VK45DE 4.5 L V8 naturally aspirated mid-engined, longitudinally mounted
- Transmission: Xtrac 6-speed sequential manual
- Power: 490hp
- Weight: 900 kg (2,000 lb)
- Fuel: Various
- Lubricants: Various
- Tyres: Dunlop; Continental

Competition history
- Notable entrants: Oreca 05; (Hong Kong) KCMG; (France) Thiriet by TDS Racing; (Philippines) Eurasia motorsport; (Russia) G-Drive Racing; (United Kingdom) Manor; (United States) DragonSpeed; (United Kingdom) RLR MSport; Alpine A460; (China) Baxi DC Racing Alpine; (France) Signatech Alpine
- Notable drivers: Oreca 05; (France) Pierre Thiriet; (France) Ludovic Badey; (France) Tristan Gommendy; (United Kingdom) Matthew Howson; (United Kingdom) Richard Bradley; (United Kingdom) Nick Tandy; (France) Nicolas Lapierre; (Russia) Roman Rusinov; (Germany) René Rast; (France) Nathanaël Berthon; (United Kingdom) Will Stevens; (United Kingdom) Alex Brundle; (China) Pu Jun Jin; (France) Tristan Gommendy; (Netherlands) Nick de Bruijn; (Thailand) Tor Graves; (United Kingdom) James Jakes; (United Kingdom) Will Stevens; (United Kingdom) Matt Rao; (Spain) Roberto Merhi; (Brazil) Antônio Pizzonia; (United Kingdom) Matthew Howson; (United Kingdom) Richard Bradley; (Mexico) Alfonso Toledano Jr.; (United Kingdom) Alex Lynn; (Japan) Shinji Nakano; (Mexico) Roberto González; (Switzerland) Mathias Beche; (France) Julien Canal; (Japan) Ryō Hirakawa; (Japan) Tsugio Matsuda; (United Kingdom) Ben Hanley; (Sweden) Henrik Hedman; (United Kingdom) Michael Lyons; (Belgium) Frédéric Vervisch; (United Kingdom) Mike Conway; (France) Nicolas Minassian; (China) David Cheng; (China) Ho-Pin Tung; (Malaysia) Jazeman Jaafar; (Malaysia) Weiron Tan; (Malaysia) Afiq Yazid; (France) Thomas Laurent; (United Kingdom) Harrison Newey; (Monaco) Stéphane Richelmi; (Malaysia) Nabil Jeffri; (Canada) John Farano; (New Zealand) Andrew Higgins; (India) Arjun Maini; Alpine A460; (United States) David Cheng; (Netherlands) Ho-Pin Tung; (France) Nelson Panciatici; (France) Paul-Loup Chatin; (United States) Gustavo Menezes; (France) Nicolas Lapierre; (Monaco) Stéphane Richelmi
- Debut: 2015 6 Hours of Silverstone
- First win: 2015 24 Hours of Le Mans
- Last win: 2018 4 Hours of Sepang
- Last event: 2020 4 Hours of The Bend
Races	Wins	Podiums	Poles	F/Laps
36	19	36	16	3
- Teams' Championships: 2 (2016 FIA WEC, 2017-18 Asian LMS)
- Drivers' Championships: 2 (2016 FIA WEC, 2017-18 Asian LMS)

The Oreca 05 is a Le Mans Prototype built by Oreca in 2015. The car was designed to compete in the LMP2 class. The car's first win came at the 2015 24 Hours of Le Mans by Hong Kong–based team KCMG. A closed-top design, it incorporates several new mechanical and safety features not used in the Oreca 03 car. Zylon anti-intrusion panels are built into the frame that prevent any mechanical components from coming into the chassis in the event of an accident. Since Oreca 05 shares the same monocoque with Rebellion R-One in LMP1 class which allowed only 1,900 mm (74.8 in) width after 2014, so the car also 1,900 mm (74.8 in) width while most other LMP2 in 2010-2016 are built to reach maximum 2,000 mm (78.7 in) width as LMP2 regulation allowed. The 05 has an electrical power steering system and an improved gearbox.

As a majority of existing cars being rebuilt into the 07, only three 05s, including the Alpine, are known to currently exist in its original form.

== Alpine A460 ==
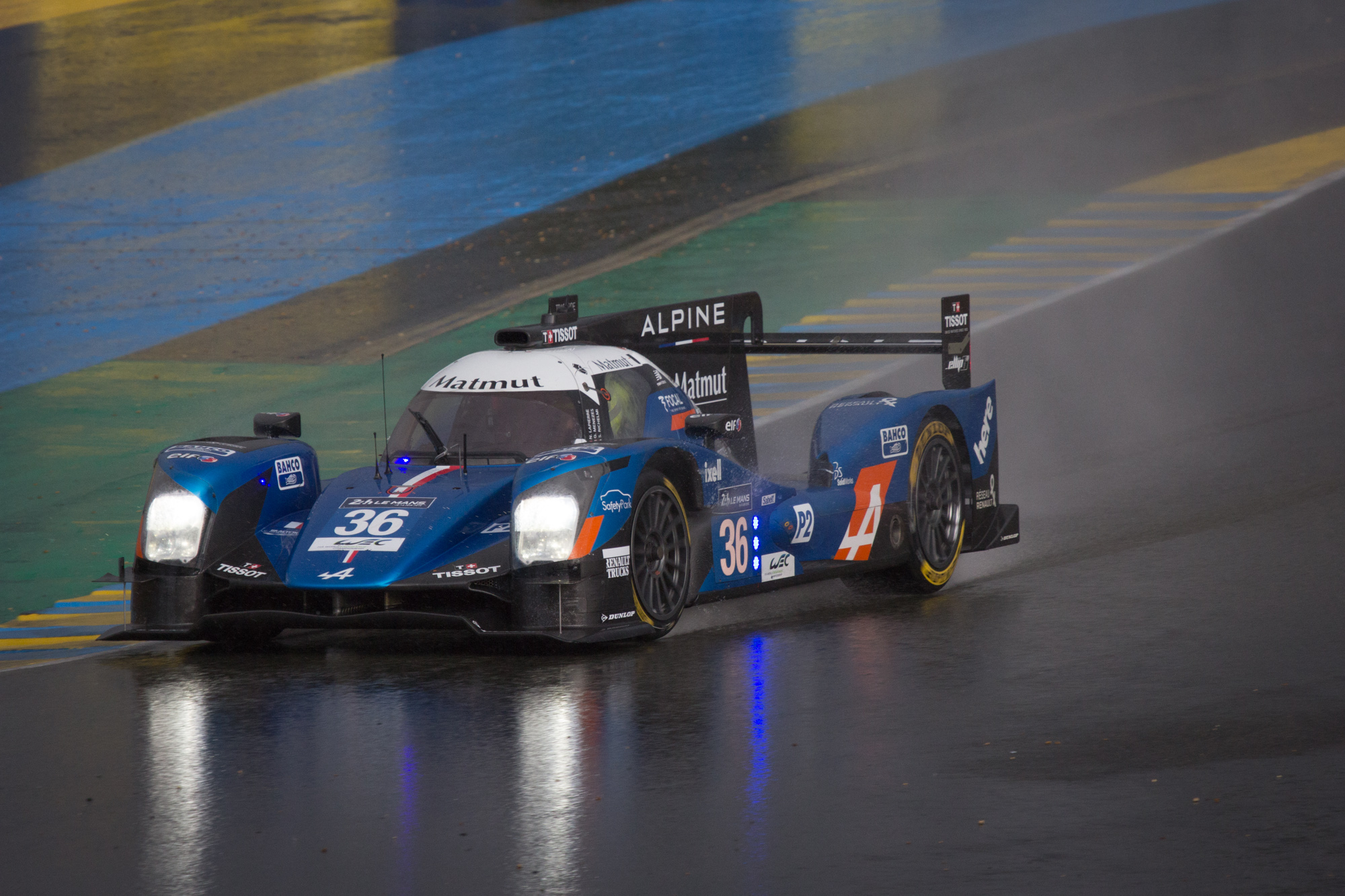
The A460 at the 2016 24 Hours of Le Mans

French car manufacturer Alpine raced the Alpine A460 in the 2016 FIA World Endurance Championship. This car is technically identical to the Oreca 05, using the same chassis and internals, with Alpine branding. This is the successor to the Alpine A450, which Alpine raced in the 2015 FIA World Endurance Championship season.

== Competition History ==
=== Complete World Endurance Championship results ===
(key) Races in bold indicates pole position. Races in italics indicates fastest lap. Green background indicates second team entry; eligible only for Drivers' championship points.

Complete FIA World Endurance Championship results
Year	Entrant	Class	Drivers	No.	Rds.	Rounds									Pts.	Pos.
Year	Entrant	Class	Drivers	No.	Rds.	1	2	3	4	5	6	7	8	9	0	NC
2015	(France) Thiriet by TDS Racing	LMP2	(France) Pierre Thiriet (France) Ludovic Badey (France) Tristan Gommendy	46	3; 3; 3	SIL	SPA	LMN; Ret	NUR	COA	FUJ	SHA	BHR		0	NC
2015	(Hong Kong) KCMG	LMP2	(United Kingdom) Matthew Howson (United Kingdom) Richard Bradley (United Kingdom) Nick Tandy (France) Nicolas Lapierre	47	All; All; 1, 4, 6-8; 2-3, 5	SIL; 4	SPA; 4	**LMN**; **1**	**NUR**; **1**	COA; 2	FUJ; Ret	SHA; 3	BHR; 2		155	2nd
2016	(Russia) G-Drive Racing	LMP2	(Russia) Roman Rusinov (Germany) René Rast (France) Nathanaël Berthon (United Kingdom) Will Stevens (United Kingdom) Alex Brundle	26	All; 1-6, 9; 1-2; 3, 7-8; 4-9	**SIL**; **3**	**SPA**; **5**	**LMS**; **2**	**NÜR**; **Ret**	MEX; 7	COA; 3	**FUJ**; **1**	SHA; 1	BHR; 1	164	3rd
2016	(Philippines) Eurasia Motorsport	LMP2	(China) Pu Jun Jin (France) Tristan Gommendy (Netherlands) Nick de Bruijn	33	3; 3; 3	SIL	SPA	LMS; 5	NÜR	MEX	COA	FUJ	SHA	BHR	0	NC
2016	(China) Baxi DC Racing Alpine	LMP2	(United States) David Cheng (Netherlands) Ho-Pin Tung (France) Nelson Panciatici (France) Paul-Loup Chatin	35	All; All; 1-6; 7-9	SIL; 6	SPA; Ret	LMS; Ret	NÜR; 7	MEX; 5	COA; 8	FUJ; 9	SHA; 8	BHR; 6	42	9th
2016	(France) Signatech Alpine	LMP2	(United States) Gustavo Menezes (France) Nicolas Lapierre (Monaco) Stéphane Richelmi	36	All; All; All	SIL; 4	SPA; 1	LMS; 1	NÜR; 1	MEX; 2	**COA**; **1**	FUJ; 3	SHA; 4	**BHR**; **3**	199	1st
2016	(United Kingdom) Manor	LMP2	(Thailand) Tor Graves (United Kingdom) James Jakes (United Kingdom) Will Stevens (United Kingdom) Matt Rao (Spain) Roberto Merhi (Brazil) Antônio Pizzonia (United Kingdom) Matthew Howson (United Kingdom) Richard Bradley (Mexico) Alfonso Toledano Jr. (United Kingdom) Alex Lynn	44	1-4; 1-2; 3, 5-9; 3, 6-7; 4; 4; 5-9; 5; 8-9	SIL; Ret	SPA; 8	LMS; Ret	NÜR; 5	MEX; Ret	COA; Ret	FUJ; 7	**SHA**; **9**	BHR; 9	42	10th
2016	(United Kingdom) Manor	LMP2	(United Kingdom) Matt Rao (United Kingdom) Richard Bradley (Spain) Roberto Merhi (Thailand) Tor Graves (United Kingdom) Alex Lynn (Japan) Shinji Nakano (Mexico) Roberto González (Switzerland) Mathias Beche (France) Julien Canal	45	1-2, 4; 1-2, 4; 1-2, 4, 9; 7-8; 7; 7; 8-9; 8; 9	SIL; 6	SPA; 3	LMS	NÜR; Ret	MEX	COA	FUJ; 11	SHA; Ret	BHR; 7	0	NC
2016	(France) Thiriet by TDS Racing	LMP2	(France) Pierre Thiriet (Switzerland) Mathias Beche (Japan) Ryō Hirakawa	46	3; 3; 3	SIL	SPA	LMS; Ret	NÜR	MEX	COA	FUJ	SHA	BHR	0	NC
2016	(Hong Kong) KCMG	LMP2	(Japan) Tsugio Matsuda (United Kingdom) Richard Bradley (United Kingdom) Matthew Howson	47	3; 3; 3	SIL	SPA	LMS; Ret	NÜR	MEX	COA	FUJ	SHA	BHR	0	NC

=== Complete European Le Mans Series results ===
(key) Races in bold indicates pole position. Races in italics indicates fastest lap.

Complete European Le Mans Series results
Year	Entrant	Class	Drivers	No.	Rds.	Rounds						Pts.	Pos.
Year	Entrant	Class	Drivers	No.	Rds.	1	2	3	4	5	6		
2015	(France) Thiriet by TDS Racing	LMP2	(France) Ludovic Badey (France) Pierre Thiriet (France) Tristan Gommendy (France) Nicolas Lapierre	46	All; All; 1-4; 5	SIL; 3	IMO; 1	RBR; 2	LEC; 6	EST; 1		91	2nd
2016	(United States) DragonSpeed	LMP2	(United Kingdom) Ben Hanley (Sweden) Henrik Hedman (France) Nicolas Lapierre	21	All; All; All	SIL; Ret	**IMO**; **3**	RBR; Ret	LEC; 3	**SPA**; **1**	**EST**; **2**	76	4th
2016	(Philippines) Eurasia Motorsport	LMP2	(France) Tristan Gommendy (Netherlands) Nick de Bruijn (China) Pu Jun Jin (United Kingdom) Michael Lyons (Belgium) Frédéric Vervisch	33	All; 1-5; 1-5; 6; 6	SIL; Ret	IMO; 5	RBR; 2	LEC; 4	SPA; Ret	EST; 5	50	5th
2016	(France) Thiriet by TDS Racing	LMP2	(Switzerland) Mathias Beche (France) Pierre Thiriet (Japan) Ryō Hirakawa (United Kingdom) Mike Conway	46	All; All; 1-3, 5-6; 4	**SIL**; **Ret**	IMO; 1	RBR; 1	**LEC**; **1**	SPA; 3	EST; 8	96	2nd

=== Complete IMSA SportsCar Championship results ===
(key) Races in bold indicates pole position. Races in italics indicates fastest lap.

Complete IMSA SportsCar Championship results
Year	Entrant	Class	Drivers	No.	Rds.	Rounds										Pts.	Pos.
Year	Entrant	Class	Drivers	No.	Rds.	1	2	3	4	5	6	7	8	9	10	Pts.	Pos.
2016	(United States) DragonSpeed	P	(Sweden) Henrik Hedman (France) Nicolas Lapierre (France) Nicolas Minassian	81	2; 2; 2	DAY	SEB; 4	LBH	LGA	DET	WGL	MOS	ELK	COA	PET	29	11th

=== Complete Asian Le Mans Series results ===
(key) Races in bold indicates pole position. Races in italics indicates fastest lap.

Year	Entrant	Class	Drivers	No.	Rds.	Rounds				Pts.	Pos.
Year	Entrant	Class	Drivers	No.	Rds.	1	2	3	4	Pts.	Pos.
2017-18	(China) Jackie Chan DC Racing X Jota	LMP2	(China) David Cheng (China) Ho-Pin Tung (Malaysia) Jazeman Jaafar (Malaysia) Weiron Tan (Malaysia) Afiq Yazid	7	1-2; 1; 2-4; 3-4; 3-4	ZHU; Ret	FUJ; 3	BUR; 1	SEP; 5	50	4th
2017-18	(China) Jackie Chan DC Racing X Jota	LMP2	(France) Thomas Laurent (United Kingdom) Harrison Newey (Monaco) Stéphane Richelmi	8	All; All; All	**ZHU**; **1**	FUJ; 1	**BUR**; **2**	SEP; 1	95	1st
2018-19	(China) Jackie Chan DC Racing X Jota Sport	LMP2	(Malaysia) Jazeman Jaafar (Malaysia) Nabil Jeffri (Malaysia) Weiron Tan	1	1; 1; 1	SHA; Ret	FUJ	CHA	SEP	0	8th
2019-20	(United Kingdom) RLR MSport	LMP2 Am	(Canada) John Farano (New Zealand) Andrew Higgins (India) Arjun Maini	59	1-2; 1-2; 1-2	SHA; 1	**BEN**; **Ret**	SEP	CHA	26	3rd

== Gallery ==
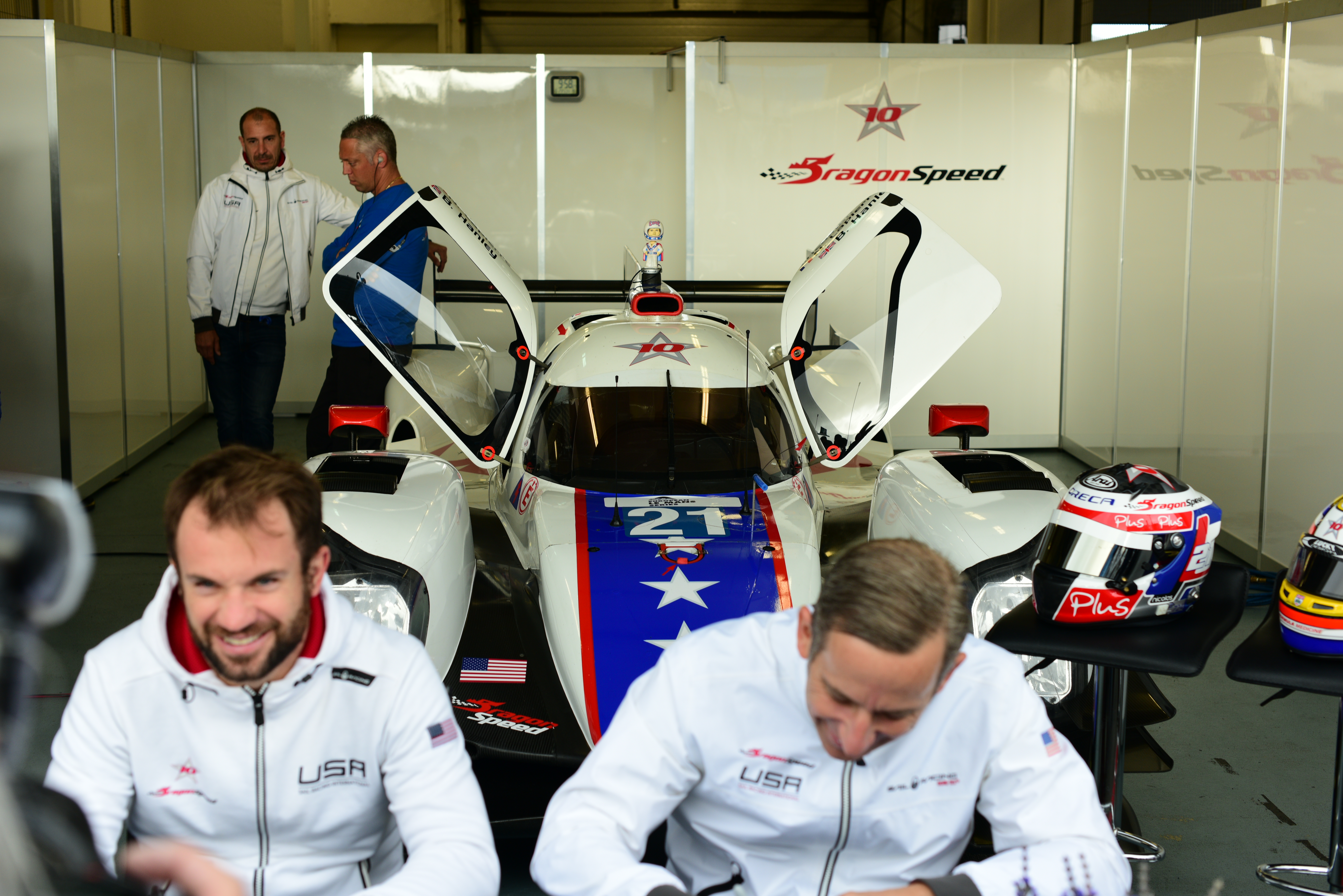
The No. 21 car in the garage of DragonSpeed at the 2016 4 Hours of Estoril

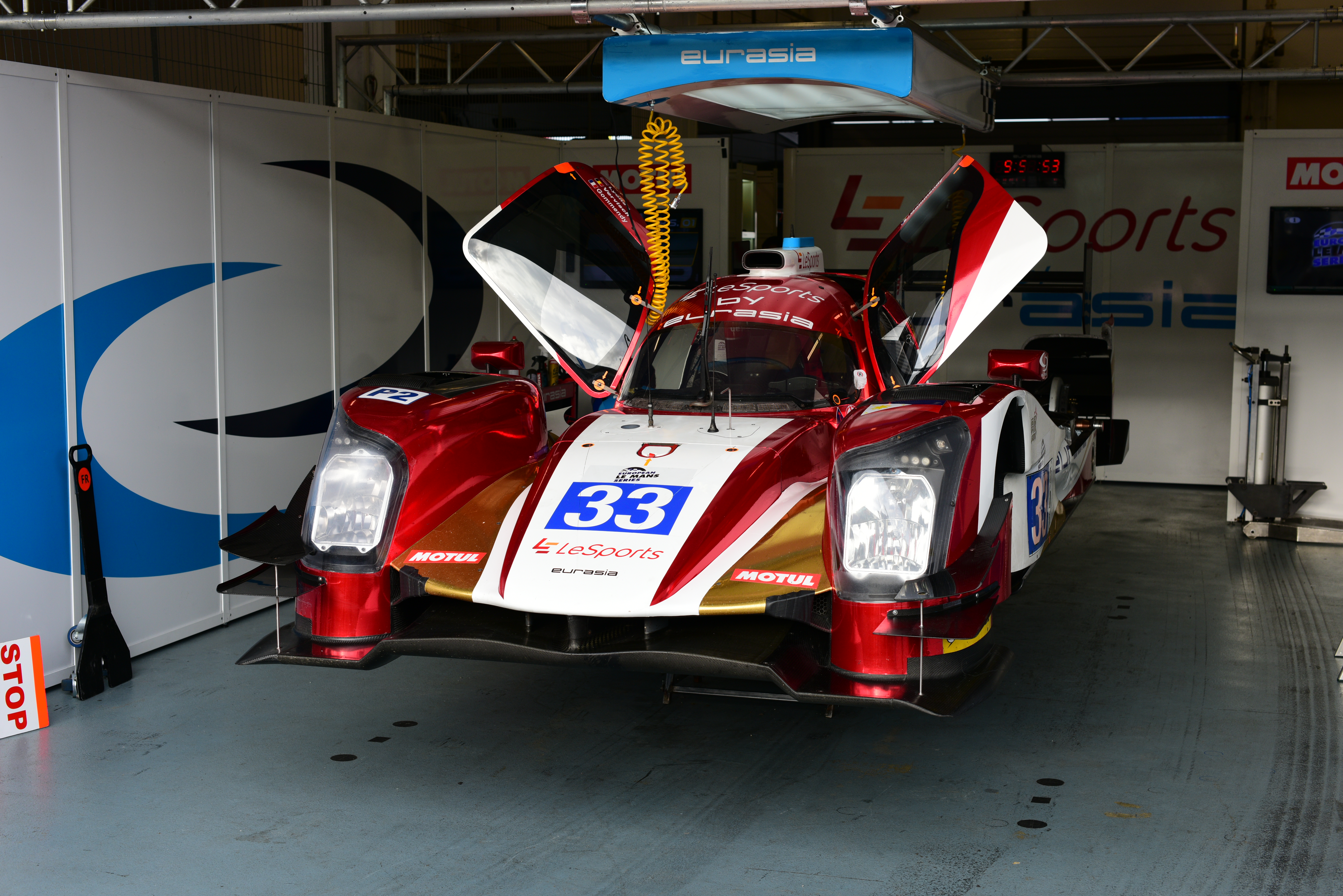
The No. 33 car of Eurasia Motorsport the 2016 4 Hours of Estoril

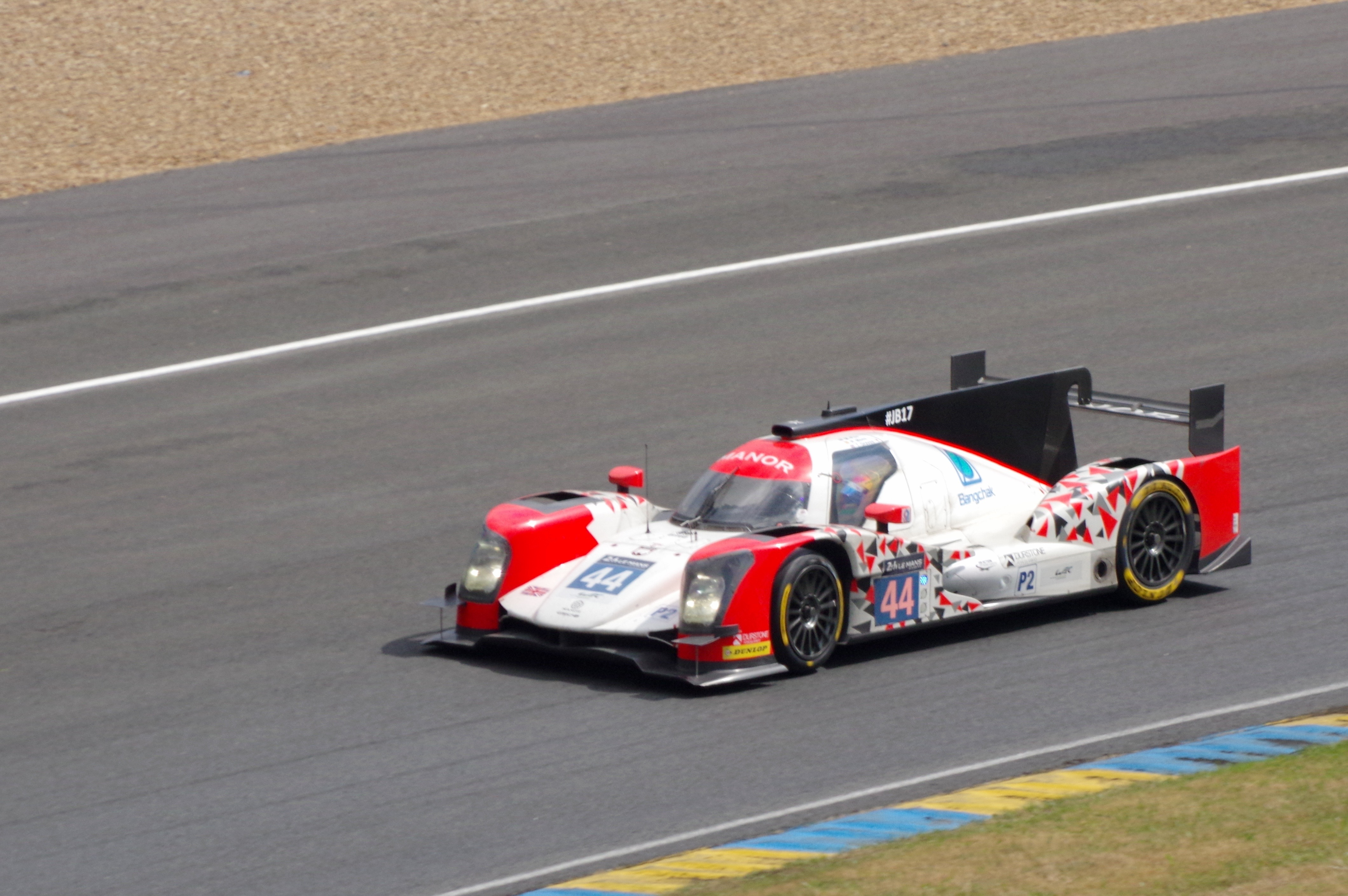
The No. 44 car entered by Manor at the 2016 24 Hours of Le Mans

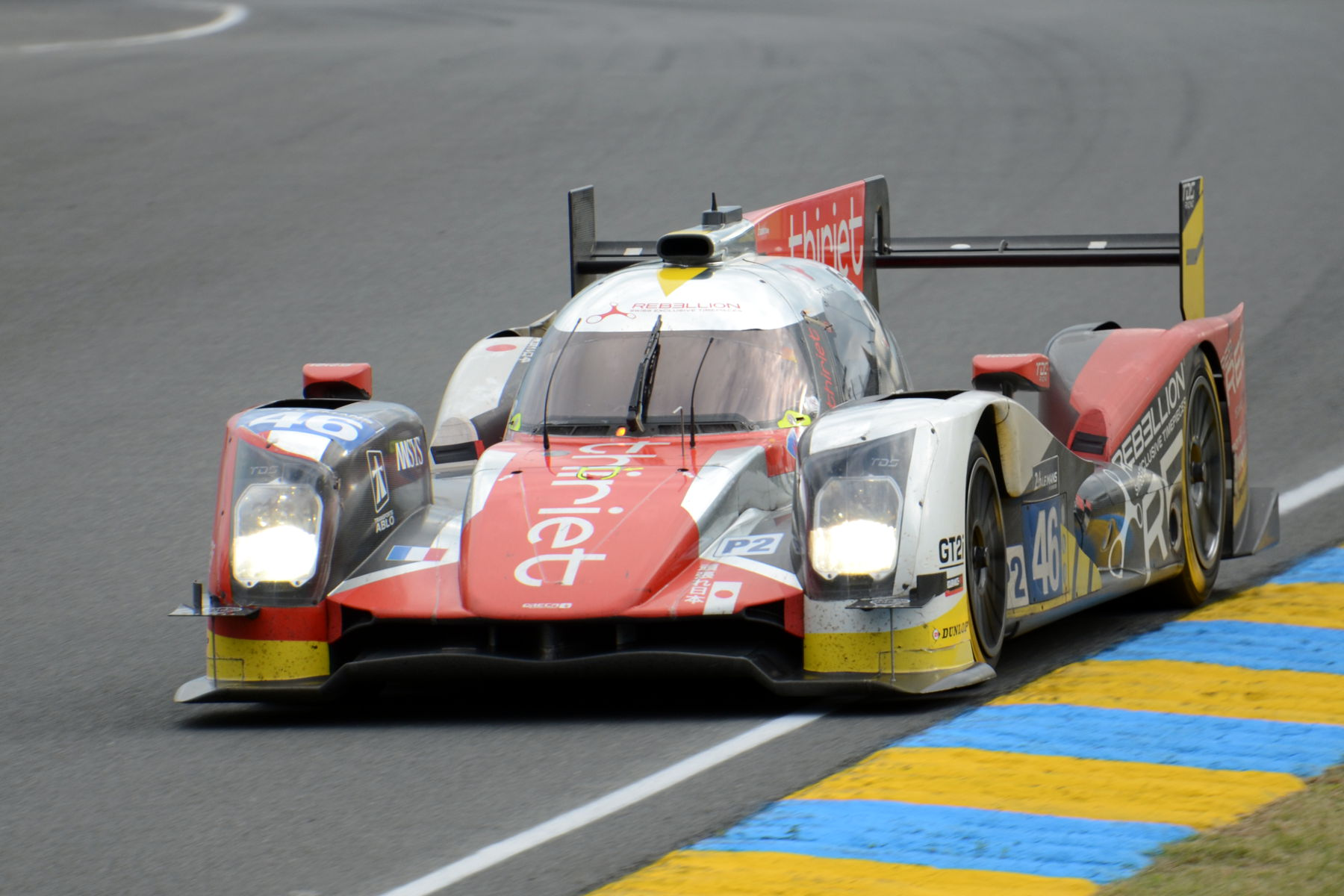
The No. 46 car entered by TDS Racing at the 2016 24 Hours of Le Mans

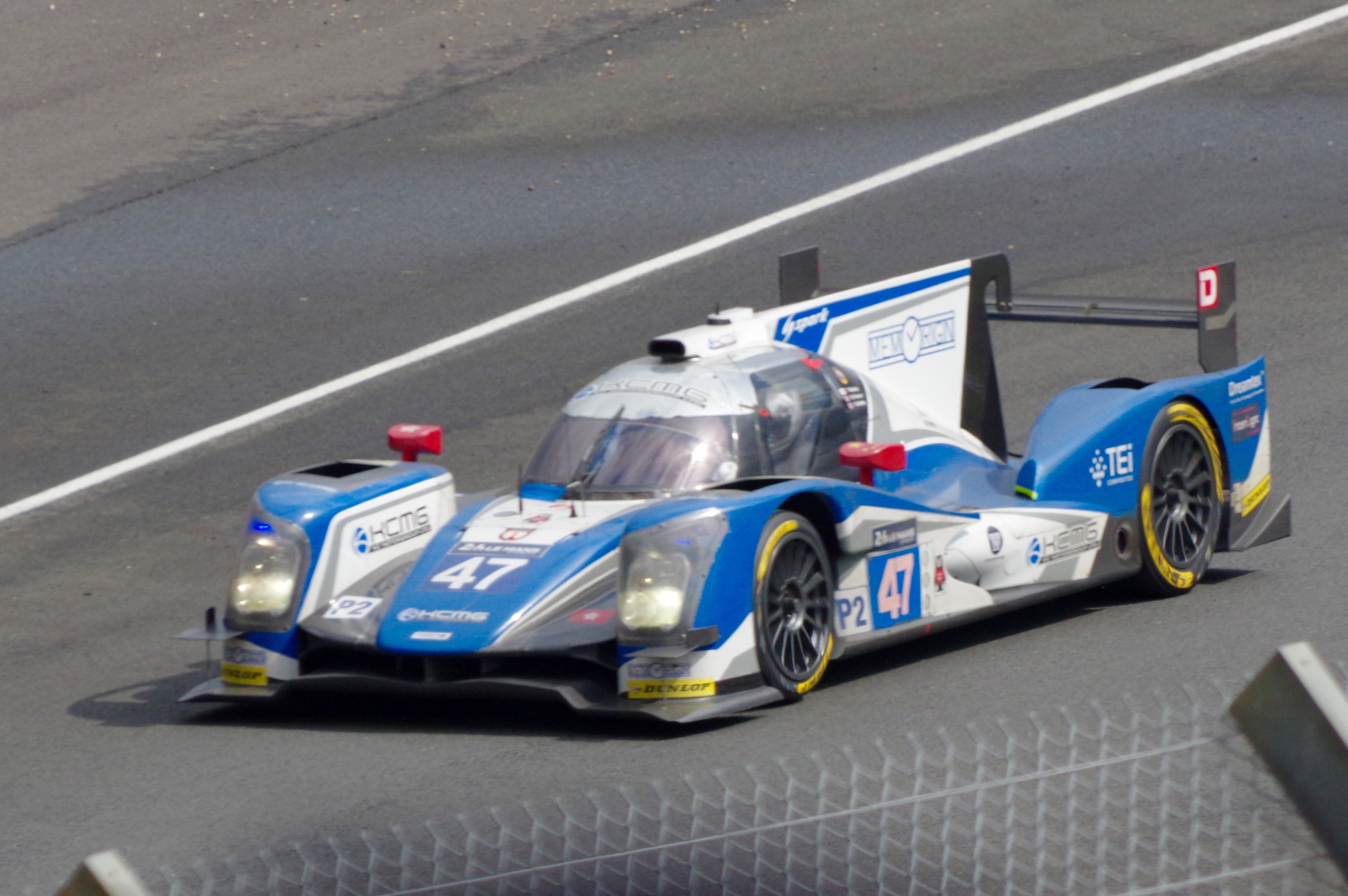
The No. 47 car entered by KCMG at the 2016 24 Hours of Le Mans

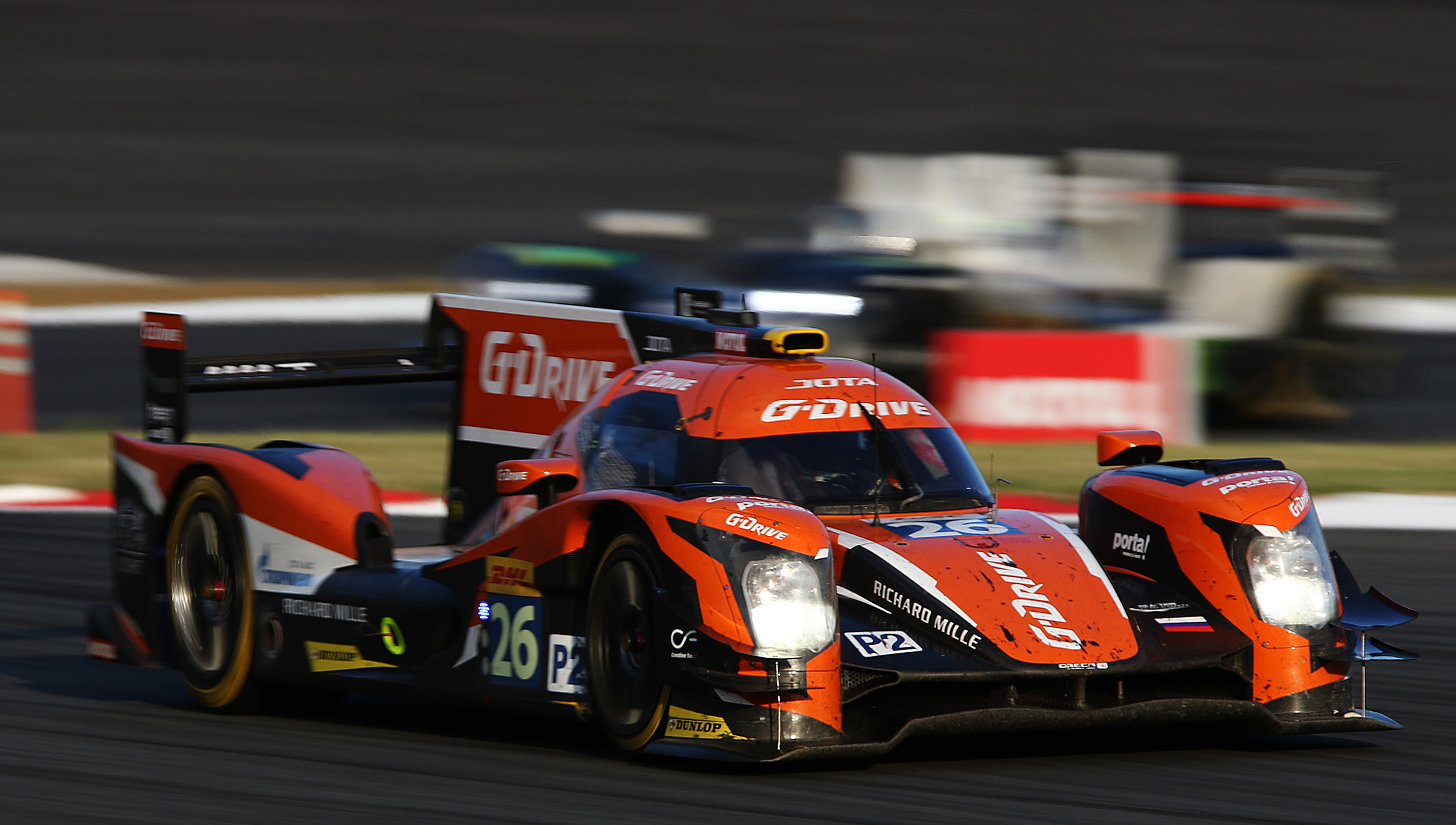
The No. 26 car entered by G-Drive Racing at the 2016 6 Hours of Fuji
