= Inès Taittinger =

French racing driver (born 1990)

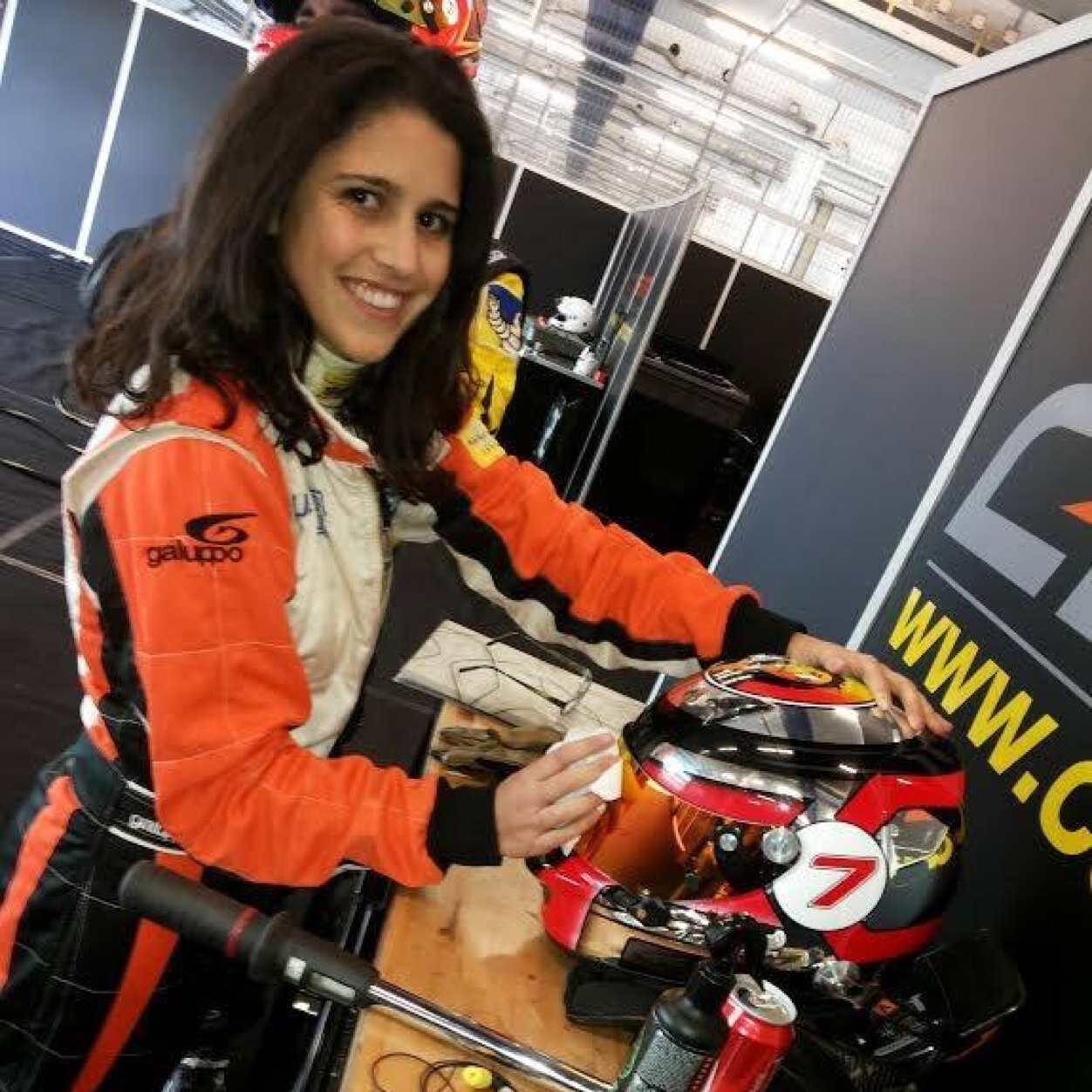
- Inès Tattinger
- Nationality: (France) French
- Born: 7 April 1990 (age 36) Boulogne-Billancourt, France
- Debut season: 2009
- Current team: CD Sport
- Categorisation: FIA Silver (until 2020); FIA Bronze (2021–)
- Car number: 32
- Former teams: Kronos Racing

Inès Taittinger (born 7 April 1990) is a French racing driver.

== Biography ==
Inès Taittinger is an endurance racing driver. She runs for the CD Sport team on the French championship: VdeV in the category proto endurance challenge, since 2009.

Initiated in Motorsports by her father (Hugues Taittinger) and her godfather and mentor Philippe Alliot, Taittinger started racing at 20 years old.

In 2013, Taittinger took part in the 25 Heures de Spa-Francorchamps VW Fun Cup with the Kronos Racing Team. In this race, she ran alongside other French drivers such as Margot Laffite, Arnaud Tsamère, Xavier Daffe, Pierre-Yves Rosoux and Fabrice Brouwers.

Since 2013, Taittinger is also the official ambassador of the city of Touquet-Paris-plage in France.

In 2016, Taittinger will race for Morgan in the LM-P2 category at the 24 Hours of Le Mans.

In 2019, Taittinger attempted to qualify for the W Series, but failed to progress beyond the evaluation day.

== Civic engagement ==
Taittinger was born with a heart defect. When she was three days old, she went through an open-heart surgery. This experience led her to involve herself with the French charity association Mécénat Chirurgie Cardiaque. This association raises fund to heal children suffering from heart defect all around the world.

== Racing records ==
In 2013, Taittinger came first in the Albi race from the Endurance Tourism Trophy (TTE). She also finished third in the Magny-Cours race during this same trophy.

For the 2013 season of the V de V championship endurance Series, Taittinger, with her teammate Kevin Bole-Besançon, came third in the 12 hours of Motorland Aragon race in Spain. They also finished fifth in the six hours of Magny-Cours race in France.

== Racing record ==
=== 24 Hours of Le Mans results ===
Year	Team	Co-Drivers	Car	Class	Laps	Pos.	Class Pos.
2016	(Germany) Pegasus Racing	(France) Léo Roussel (France) Rémy Striebig	Morgan LMP2-Nissan	LMP2	292	DNF	DNF
