= 2019 4 Hours of Spa-Francorchamps =

Layout of Circuit de Spa-Francorchamps, where the race was held

The 2019 4 Hours of Spa-Francorchamps was an endurance sportscar racing event held on September 22, 2019, at Circuit de Spa-Francorchamps. It was the fifth round of the 2019 European Le Mans Series.

== Race ==
=== Race results ===
Class winners are in bold and ‡.

Pos	Class	No	Team	Drivers	Chassis	Tyre	Laps	Time/Retired
Pos	Class	No	Team	Drivers	Engine	Tyre	Laps	Time/Retired
1	**LMP2**	**22**	**(United Kingdom) United Autosports**	**(United Kingdom) Phil Hanson** **(Portugal) Filipe Albuquerque**	**Oreca 07**	MI	**101**	**4:00:43.483‡**
1	**LMP2**	**22**	**(United Kingdom) United Autosports**	**(United Kingdom) Phil Hanson** **(Portugal) Filipe Albuquerque**	**Gibson GK428 4.2 L V8**	MI	**101**	**4:00:43.483‡**
2	LMP2	37	(Switzerland) Cool Racing	(Switzerland) Antonin Borga (France) Nicolas Lapierre	Oreca 07	MI	101	+12.304
2	LMP2	37	(Switzerland) Cool Racing	(Switzerland) Antonin Borga (France) Nicolas Lapierre	Gibson GK428 4.2 L V8	MI	101	+12.304
3	LMP2	39	(France) Graff	(France) Alexandre Cougnaud (France) Tristan Gommendy (Switzerland) Jonathan Hirschi	Oreca 07	MI	101	+12.504
3	LMP2	39	(France) Graff	(France) Alexandre Cougnaud (France) Tristan Gommendy (Switzerland) Jonathan Hirschi	Gibson GK428 4.2 L V8	MI	101	+12.504
4	LMP2	26	(Russia) G-Drive Racing	(Russia) Roman Rusinov (Netherlands) Job van Uitert (France) Jean-Éric Vergne	Aurus 01	D	101	+39.279
4	LMP2	26	(Russia) G-Drive Racing	(Russia) Roman Rusinov (Netherlands) Job van Uitert (France) Jean-Éric Vergne	Gibson GK428 4.2 L V8	D	101	+39.279
5	LMP2	30	(France) Duqueine Engineering	(United Kingdom) Richard Bradley (France) Nico Jamin (France) Pierre Ragues	Oreca 07	MI	101	+48.356
5	LMP2	30	(France) Duqueine Engineering	(United Kingdom) Richard Bradley (France) Nico Jamin (France) Pierre Ragues	Gibson GK428 4.2 L V8	MI	101	+48.356
6	LMP2	28	(France) IDEC Sport	(France) Paul-Loup Chatin (France) Paul Lafargue (Mexico) Memo Rojas	Oreca 07	MI	101	+55.736
6	LMP2	28	(France) IDEC Sport	(France) Paul-Loup Chatin (France) Paul Lafargue (Mexico) Memo Rojas	Gibson GK428 4.2 L V8	MI	101	+55.736
7	LMP2	21	(United States) DragonSpeed	(Australia) James Allen (Sweden) Henrik Hedman (United Kingdom) Ben Hanley	Oreca 07	MI	101	+1:07.255
7	LMP2	21	(United States) DragonSpeed	(Australia) James Allen (Sweden) Henrik Hedman (United Kingdom) Ben Hanley	Gibson GK428 4.2 L V8	MI	101	+1:07.255
8	LMP2	23	(France) Panis Barthez Competition	(Austria) René Binder (France) Julien Canal (United Kingdom) Will Stevens	Oreca 07	D	101	+1:19.813
8	LMP2	23	(France) Panis Barthez Competition	(Austria) René Binder (France) Julien Canal (United Kingdom) Will Stevens	Gibson GK428 4.2 L V8	D	101	+1:19.813
9	LMP2	32	(United Kingdom) United Autosports	(United Kingdom) Alex Brundle (Republic of Ireland) Ryan Cullen (United States) William Owen	Oreca 07	MI	101	+1:42.134
9	LMP2	32	(United Kingdom) United Autosports	(United Kingdom) Alex Brundle (Republic of Ireland) Ryan Cullen (United States) William Owen	Gibson GK428 4.2 L V8	MI	101	+1:42.134
10	LMP2	25	(Portugal) Algarve Pro Racing	(United States) John Falb (France) Andrea Pizzitola (France) Olivier Pla	Oreca 07	D	100	+1 Lap
10	LMP2	25	(Portugal) Algarve Pro Racing	(United States) John Falb (France) Andrea Pizzitola (France) Olivier Pla	Gibson GK428 4.2 L V8	D	100	+1 Lap
11	LMP2	35	(United Kingdom) BHK Motorsport	(Italy) Sergio Campana (Italy) Francesco Dracone (United Kingdom) Garry Findlay	Oreca 07	D	100	+1 Lap
11	LMP2	35	(United Kingdom) BHK Motorsport	(Italy) Sergio Campana (Italy) Francesco Dracone (United Kingdom) Garry Findlay	Gibson GK428 4.2 L V8	D	100	+1 Lap
12	LMP2	34	(Poland) Inter Europol Competition	(Poland) Jakub Śmiechowski (Switzerland) Mathias Beche (Belgium) Sam Dejonghe	Ligier JS P217	MI	99	+2 Laps
12	LMP2	34	(Poland) Inter Europol Competition	(Poland) Jakub Śmiechowski (Switzerland) Mathias Beche (Belgium) Sam Dejonghe	Gibson GK428 4.2 L V8	MI	99	+2 Laps
13	LMP2	31	(Portugal) Algarve Pro Racing	(Sweden) Henning Enqvist (United States) James French (South Korea) Tacksung Kim	Oreca 07	D	99	+2 Laps
13	LMP2	31	(Portugal) Algarve Pro Racing	(Sweden) Henning Enqvist (United States) James French (South Korea) Tacksung Kim	Gibson GK428 4.2 L V8	D	99	+2 Laps
14	**LMGTE**	**51**	**(United States) Luzich Racing**	**(France) Fabien Lavergne** **(Denmark) Nicklas Nielsen** **(Italy) Alessandro Pier Guidi**	**Ferrari 488 GTE**	D	**95**	**+6 Laps‡**
14	**LMGTE**	**51**	**(United States) Luzich Racing**	**(France) Fabien Lavergne** **(Denmark) Nicklas Nielsen** **(Italy) Alessandro Pier Guidi**	**Ferrari F154CB 3.9 L Turbo V8**	D	**95**	**+6 Laps‡**
15	LMGTE	77	(Germany) Dempsey-Proton Racing	(Italy) Matteo Cairoli (Italy) Riccardo Pera (Germany) Christian Ried	Porsche 911 RSR	D	95	+6 Laps
15	LMGTE	77	(Germany) Dempsey-Proton Racing	(Italy) Matteo Cairoli (Italy) Riccardo Pera (Germany) Christian Ried	Porsche 4.0 L Flat-6	D	95	+6 Laps
16	**LMP3**	**11**	**(United States) Eurointernational**	**(Denmark) Mikkel Jensen** **(Germany) Jens Petersen**	**Ligier JS P3**	MI	**95**	**+6 Laps‡**
16	**LMP3**	**11**	**(United States) Eurointernational**	**(Denmark) Mikkel Jensen** **(Germany) Jens Petersen**	**Nissan VK50VE 5.0 L V8**	MI	**95**	**+6 Laps‡**
17	LMP3	13	(Poland) Inter Europol Competition	(Germany) Martin Hippe (United Kingdom) Nigel Moore	Ligier JS P3	MI	95	+6 Laps
17	LMP3	13	(Poland) Inter Europol Competition	(Germany) Martin Hippe (United Kingdom) Nigel Moore	Nissan VK50VE 5.0 L V8	MI	95	+6 Laps
18	LMP3	7	(United Kingdom) Nielsen Racing	(United Kingdom) Colin Noble (United Kingdom) Anthony Wells	Norma M30	MI	95	+6 Laps
18	LMP3	7	(United Kingdom) Nielsen Racing	(United Kingdom) Colin Noble (United Kingdom) Anthony Wells	Nissan VK50VE 5.0 L V8	MI	95	+6 Laps
19	LMGTE	55	(Switzerland) Spirit of Race	(United Kingdom) Duncan Cameron (Republic of Ireland) Matt Griffin (United Kingdom) Aaron Scott	Ferrari 488 GTE	D	95	+6 Laps
19	LMGTE	55	(Switzerland) Spirit of Race	(United Kingdom) Duncan Cameron (Republic of Ireland) Matt Griffin (United Kingdom) Aaron Scott	Ferrari F154CB 3.9 L Turbo V8	D	95	+6 Laps
20	LMP3	17	(France) Ultimate	(France) François Heriau (France) Jean-Baptiste Lahaye (France) Matthieu Lahaye	Norma M30	MI	94	+7 Laps
20	LMP3	17	(France) Ultimate	(France) François Heriau (France) Jean-Baptiste Lahaye (France) Matthieu Lahaye	Nissan VK50VE 5.0 L V8	MI	94	+7 Laps
21	LMP3	3	(United Kingdom) United Autosports	(United Kingdom) Christian England (United Kingdom) Andrew Bentley	Ligier JS P3	MI	94	+7 Laps
21	LMP3	3	(United Kingdom) United Autosports	(United Kingdom) Christian England (United Kingdom) Andrew Bentley	Nissan VK50VE 5.0 L V8	MI	94	+7 Laps
22	LMP2	43	(United Kingdom) RLR MSport	(Canada) John Farano (India) Arjun Maini (Brazil) Bruno Senna	Oreca 07	D	94	+7 Laps
22	LMP2	43	(United Kingdom) RLR MSport	(Canada) John Farano (India) Arjun Maini (Brazil) Bruno Senna	Gibson GK428 4.2 L V8	D	94	+7 Laps
23	LMP3	14	(Poland) Inter Europol Competition	(Germany) Paul Scheuschner (Austria) Constantin Schöll	Ligier JS P3	MI	94	+7 Laps
23	LMP3	14	(Poland) Inter Europol Competition	(Germany) Paul Scheuschner (Austria) Constantin Schöll	Nissan VK50VE 5.0 L V8	MI	94	+7 Laps
24	LMP3	10	(Italy) Oregon Team	(Italy) Lorenzo Bontempelli (Italy) Damiano Fioravanti (Lithuania) Gustas Grinbergas	Norma M30	MI	94	+7 Laps
24	LMP3	10	(Italy) Oregon Team	(Italy) Lorenzo Bontempelli (Italy) Damiano Fioravanti (Lithuania) Gustas Grinbergas	Nissan VK50VE 5.0 L V8	MI	94	+7 Laps
25	LMP3	9	(Switzerland) Realteam Racing	(Switzerland) David Droux (Switzerland) Esteban García	Norma M30	MI	94	+7 Laps
25	LMP3	9	(Switzerland) Realteam Racing	(Switzerland) David Droux (Switzerland) Esteban García	Nissan VK50VE 5.0 L V8	MI	94	+7 Laps
26	LMP3	8	(United Kingdom) Nielsen Racing	(United Kingdom) James Littlejohn (United Kingdom) Nicholas Adcock	Ligier JS P3	MI	93	+8 Laps
26	LMP3	8	(United Kingdom) Nielsen Racing	(United Kingdom) James Littlejohn (United Kingdom) Nicholas Adcock	Nissan VK50VE 5.0 L V8	MI	93	+8 Laps
27	LMGTE	83	(Switzerland) Kessel Racing	(Switzerland) Rahel Frey (Denmark) Michelle Gatting (Italy) Manuela Gostner	Ferrari 488 GTE	D	93	+8 Laps
27	LMGTE	83	(Switzerland) Kessel Racing	(Switzerland) Rahel Frey (Denmark) Michelle Gatting (Italy) Manuela Gostner	Ferrari F154CB 3.9 L Turbo V8	D	93	+8 Laps
28	LMP3	6	(United Kingdom) 360 Racing	(Canada) James Dayson (United Kingdom) Ross Kaiser (United Kingdom) Terrence Woodward	Ligier JS P3	MI	93	+8 Laps
28	LMP3	6	(United Kingdom) 360 Racing	(Canada) James Dayson (United Kingdom) Ross Kaiser (United Kingdom) Terrence Woodward	Nissan VK50VE 5.0 L V8	MI	93	+8 Laps
29	LMGTE	60	(Switzerland) Kessel Racing	(Italy) Sergio Pianezzola (Italy) Andrea Piccini (South Africa) David Perel	Ferrari 488 GTE	D	93	+8 Laps
29	LMGTE	60	(Switzerland) Kessel Racing	(Italy) Sergio Pianezzola (Italy) Andrea Piccini (South Africa) David Perel	Ferrari F154CB 3.9 L Turbo V8	D	93	+8 Laps
30	LMP2	20	(Denmark) High Class Racing	(Denmark) Dennis Andersen (Denmark) Anders Fjordbach	Oreca 07	D	92	+9 Laps
30	LMP2	20	(Denmark) High Class Racing	(Denmark) Dennis Andersen (Denmark) Anders Fjordbach	Gibson GK428 4.2 L V8	D	92	+9 Laps
31	LMP3	15	(United Kingdom) RLR MSport	(Denmark) Christian Stubbe Olsen (United Kingdom) Martin Rich (Denmark) Martin Vedel Mortensen	Ligier JS P3	MI	91	+10 Laps
31	LMP3	15	(United Kingdom) RLR MSport	(Denmark) Christian Stubbe Olsen (United Kingdom) Martin Rich (Denmark) Martin Vedel Mortensen	Nissan VK50VE 5.0 L V8	MI	91	+10 Laps
32	LMP3	5	(United Kingdom) 360 Racing	(Australia) John Corbett (Greece) Andreas Laskaratos (United Kingdom) James Winslow	Ligier JS P3	MI	91	+10 Laps
32	LMP3	5	(United Kingdom) 360 Racing	(Australia) John Corbett (Greece) Andreas Laskaratos (United Kingdom) James Winslow	Nissan VK50VE 5.0 L V8	MI	91	+10 Laps
33	LMGTE	66	(United Kingdom) JMW Motorsport	(Italy) Matteo Cressoni (Canada) Wei Lu (United States) Jeff Segal	Ferrari 488 GTE	D	87	+14 Laps
33	LMGTE	66	(United Kingdom) JMW Motorsport	(Italy) Matteo Cressoni (Canada) Wei Lu (United States) Jeff Segal	Ferrari F154CB 3.9 L Turbo V8	D	87	+14 Laps
34	LMP3	2	(United Kingdom) United Autosports	(United Kingdom) Wayne Boyd (Brazil) Tommy Erdos (Canada) Garett Grist	Ligier JS P3	MI	93	Did not finish
34	LMP3	2	(United Kingdom) United Autosports	(United Kingdom) Wayne Boyd (Brazil) Tommy Erdos (Canada) Garett Grist	Nissan VK50VE 5.0 L V8	MI	93	Did not finish
35	LMP2	27	(France) IDEC Sport	(France) Stéphane Adler (France) William Cavailhes (France) Erik Maris	Ligier JS P217	MI	89	Did not finish
35	LMP2	27	(France) IDEC Sport	(France) Stéphane Adler (France) William Cavailhes (France) Erik Maris	Gibson GK428 4.2 L V8	MI	89	Did not finish
36	LMP2	24	(France) Panis Barthez Competition	(France) Timothé Buret (Russia) Konstantin Tereshchenko	Ligier JS P217	D	73	Brake failure
36	LMP2	24	(France) Panis Barthez Competition	(France) Timothé Buret (Russia) Konstantin Tereshchenko	Gibson GK428 4.2 L V8	D	73	Brake failure
37	LMP3	19	(France) M Racing	(Switzerland) Lucas Légeret (France) Laurent Millara	Norma M30	MI	54	Did not finish
37	LMP3	19	(France) M Racing	(Switzerland) Lucas Légeret (France) Laurent Millara	Nissan VK50VE 5.0 L V8	MI	54	Did not finish

European Le Mans Series
Previous race: Silverstone	2019 season	Next race: Portimão
