= 2019 ELMS 4 Hours of Silverstone =

Layout of Silverstone Circuit, where the race was held

The 2019 ELMS 4 Hours of Silverstone was an endurance sportscar racing event held on August 31, 2019, at the Silverstone Circuit. It was the fourth round of the 2019 European Le Mans Series.

== Race ==
=== Race results ===
Class winners are in bold and ‡.

Pos	Class	No	Team	Drivers	Chassis	Tyre	Laps	Time/Retired
Pos	Class	No	Team	Drivers	Engine	Tyre	Laps	Time/Retired
1	**LMP2**	**28**	**(France) IDEC Sport**	**(France) Paul-Loup Chatin** **(France) Paul Lafargue** **(Mexico) Memo Rojas**	**Oreca 07**	M	**118**	**4:00:27.086‡**
1	**LMP2**	**28**	**(France) IDEC Sport**	**(France) Paul-Loup Chatin** **(France) Paul Lafargue** **(Mexico) Memo Rojas**	**Gibson GK428 4.2 L V8**	M	**118**	**4:00:27.086‡**
2	LMP2	26	(Russia) G-Drive Racing	(Russia) Roman Rusinov (Netherlands) Job van Uitert (France) Jean-Éric Vergne	Aurus 01	D	118	+9.955
2	LMP2	26	(Russia) G-Drive Racing	(Russia) Roman Rusinov (Netherlands) Job van Uitert (France) Jean-Éric Vergne	Gibson GK428 4.2 L V8	D	118	+9.955
3	LMP2	39	(France) Graff	(France) Alexandre Cougnaud (France) Tristan Gommendy (Switzerland) Jonathan Hirschi	Oreca 07	M	118	+17.963
3	LMP2	39	(France) Graff	(France) Alexandre Cougnaud (France) Tristan Gommendy (Switzerland) Jonathan Hirschi	Gibson GK428 4.2 L V8	M	118	+17.963
4	LMP2	21	(United States) DragonSpeed	(Australia) James Allen (Sweden) Henrik Hedman (United Kingdom) Ben Hanley	Oreca 07	M	118	+19.371
4	LMP2	21	(United States) DragonSpeed	(Australia) James Allen (Sweden) Henrik Hedman (United Kingdom) Ben Hanley	Gibson GK428 4.2 L V8	M	118	+19.371
5	LMP2	24	(France) Panis Barthez Competition	(France) Timothé Buret (Russia) Konstantin Tereshchenko	Ligier JS P217	D	118	+40.003
5	LMP2	24	(France) Panis Barthez Competition	(France) Timothé Buret (Russia) Konstantin Tereshchenko	Gibson GK428 4.2 L V8	D	118	+40.003
6	LMP2	25	(Portugal) Algarve Pro Racing	(United States) John Falb (France) Andrea Pizzitola (France) Olivier Pla	Oreca 07	D	118	+44.556
6	LMP2	25	(Portugal) Algarve Pro Racing	(United States) John Falb (France) Andrea Pizzitola (France) Olivier Pla	Gibson GK428 4.2 L V8	D	118	+44.556
7	LMP2	23	(France) Panis Barthez Competition	(Austria) René Binder (France) Julien Canal (United Kingdom) Will Stevens	Oreca 07	D	118	+1:03.891
7	LMP2	23	(France) Panis Barthez Competition	(Austria) René Binder (France) Julien Canal (United Kingdom) Will Stevens	Gibson GK428 4.2 L V8	D	118	+1:03.891
8	LMP2	32	(United Kingdom) United Autosports	(United Kingdom) Alex Brundle (Republic of Ireland) Ryan Cullen (United States) William Owen	Ligier JS P217	M	117	+1 Lap
8	LMP2	32	(United Kingdom) United Autosports	(United Kingdom) Alex Brundle (Republic of Ireland) Ryan Cullen (United States) William Owen	Gibson GK428 4.2 L V8	M	117	+1 Lap
9	LMP2	31	(Portugal) Algarve Pro Racing	(Sweden) Henning Enqvist (United States) James French (South Korea) Tacksung Kim	Oreca 07	D	117	+1 Lap
9	LMP2	31	(Portugal) Algarve Pro Racing	(Sweden) Henning Enqvist (United States) James French (South Korea) Tacksung Kim	Gibson GK428 4.2 L V8	D	117	+1 Lap
10	LMP2	35	(United Kingdom) BHK Motorsport	(Italy) Sergio Campana (Italy) Francesco Dracone (United Kingdom) Garry Findlay	Oreca 07	D	117	+1 Lap
10	LMP2	35	(United Kingdom) BHK Motorsport	(Italy) Sergio Campana (Italy) Francesco Dracone (United Kingdom) Garry Findlay	Gibson GK428 4.2 L V8	D	117	+1 Lap
11	LMP2	20	(Denmark) High Class Racing	(Denmark) Dennis Andersen (Denmark) Anders Fjordbach	Oreca 07	D	116	+2 Laps
11	LMP2	20	(Denmark) High Class Racing	(Denmark) Dennis Andersen (Denmark) Anders Fjordbach	Gibson GK428 4.2 L V8	D	116	+2 Laps
12	LMP2	34	(Poland) Inter Europol Competition	(Austria) Lukas Dunner (France) Adrien Tambay (Poland) Jakub Śmiechowski	Ligier JS P217	M	116	+2 Laps
12	LMP2	34	(Poland) Inter Europol Competition	(Austria) Lukas Dunner (France) Adrien Tambay (Poland) Jakub Śmiechowski	Gibson GK428 4.2 L V8	M	116	+2 Laps
13	LMP2	27	(France) IDEC Sport	(France) Stéphane Adler (France) William Cavailhes (France) Patrice Lafargue	Ligier JS P217	M	114	+4 Laps
13	LMP2	27	(France) IDEC Sport	(France) Stéphane Adler (France) William Cavailhes (France) Patrice Lafargue	Gibson GK428 4.2 L V8	M	114	+4 Laps
14	**LMP3**	**11**	**(United States) Eurointernational**	**(Denmark) Mikkel Jensen** **(Germany) Jens Petersen**	**Ligier JS P3**	M	**111**	**+7 Laps‡**
14	**LMP3**	**11**	**(United States) Eurointernational**	**(Denmark) Mikkel Jensen** **(Germany) Jens Petersen**	**Nissan VK50VE 5.0 L V8**	M	**111**	**+7 Laps‡**
15	LMP3	13	(Poland) Inter Europol Competition	(Germany) Martin Hippe (United Kingdom) Nigel Moore	Ligier JS P3	M	111	+7 Laps
15	LMP3	13	(Poland) Inter Europol Competition	(Germany) Martin Hippe (United Kingdom) Nigel Moore	Nissan VK50VE 5.0 L V8	M	111	+7 Laps
16	LMP3	2	(United Kingdom) United Autosports	(United Kingdom) Wayne Boyd (Brazil) Tommy Erdos (Canada) Garett Grist	Ligier JS P3	M	110	+8 Laps
16	LMP3	2	(United Kingdom) United Autosports	(United Kingdom) Wayne Boyd (Brazil) Tommy Erdos (Canada) Garett Grist	Nissan VK50VE 5.0 L V8	M	110	+8 Laps
17	LMP3	6	(United Kingdom) 360 Racing	(Canada) James Dayson (United Kingdom) Ross Kaiser (United Kingdom) Terrence Woodward	Ligier JS P3	M	110	+8 Laps
17	LMP3	6	(United Kingdom) 360 Racing	(Canada) James Dayson (United Kingdom) Ross Kaiser (United Kingdom) Terrence Woodward	Nissan VK50VE 5.0 L V8	M	110	+8 Laps
18	LMP3	7	(United Kingdom) Nielsen Racing	(United Kingdom) Colin Noble (United Kingdom) Anthony Wells	Norma M30	M	110	+8 Laps
18	LMP3	7	(United Kingdom) Nielsen Racing	(United Kingdom) Colin Noble (United Kingdom) Anthony Wells	Nissan VK50VE 5.0 L V8	M	110	+8 Laps
19	LMP3	5	(United Kingdom) 360 Racing	(Australia) John Corbett (Greece) Andreas Laskaratos (United Kingdom) James Winslow	Ligier JS P3	M	109	+9 Laps
19	LMP3	5	(United Kingdom) 360 Racing	(Australia) John Corbett (Greece) Andreas Laskaratos (United Kingdom) James Winslow	Nissan VK50VE 5.0 L V8	M	109	+9 Laps
20	**LMGTE**	**88**	**(Germany) Dempsey-Proton Racing**	**(Italy) Gianluca Giraudi** **(Austria) Thomas Preining** **(Mexico) Ricardo Sanchez**	**Porsche 911 RSR**	D	**109**	**+9 Laps‡**
20	**LMGTE**	**88**	**(Germany) Dempsey-Proton Racing**	**(Italy) Gianluca Giraudi** **(Austria) Thomas Preining** **(Mexico) Ricardo Sanchez**	**Porsche 4.0 L Flat-6**	D	**109**	**+9 Laps‡**
21	LMP3	17	(France) Ultimate	(France) François Heriau (France) Jean-Baptiste Lahaye (France) Matthieu Lahaye	Norma M30	M	109	+9 Laps
21	LMP3	17	(France) Ultimate	(France) François Heriau (France) Jean-Baptiste Lahaye (France) Matthieu Lahaye	Nissan VK50VE 5.0 L V8	M	109	+9 Laps
22	LMGTE	83	(Switzerland) Kessel Racing	(Switzerland) Rahel Frey (Denmark) Michelle Gatting (Italy) Manuela Gostner	Ferrari 488 GTE	D	109	+9 Laps
22	LMGTE	83	(Switzerland) Kessel Racing	(Switzerland) Rahel Frey (Denmark) Michelle Gatting (Italy) Manuela Gostner	Ferrari F154CB 3.9 L Turbo V8	D	109	+9 Laps
23	LMP3	19	(France) M Racing	(Switzerland) Lucas Légeret (France) Laurent Millara (France) Yann Ehrlacher	Norma M30	M	109	+9 Laps
23	LMP3	19	(France) M Racing	(Switzerland) Lucas Légeret (France) Laurent Millara (France) Yann Ehrlacher	Nissan VK50VE 5.0 L V8	M	109	+9 Laps
24	LMP3	8	(United Kingdom) Nielsen Racing	(United Kingdom) James Littlejohn (Japan) Nobuya Yamanaka	Ligier JS P3	M	109	+9 Laps
24	LMP3	8	(United Kingdom) Nielsen Racing	(United Kingdom) James Littlejohn (Japan) Nobuya Yamanaka	Nissan VK50VE 5.0 L V8	M	109	+9 Laps
25	LMGTE	60	(Switzerland) Kessel Racing	(Italy) Sergio Pianezzola (Italy) Nicola Cadei (Italy) Giacomo Piccini	Ferrari 488 GTE	D	109	+9 Laps
25	LMGTE	60	(Switzerland) Kessel Racing	(Italy) Sergio Pianezzola (Italy) Nicola Cadei (Italy) Giacomo Piccini	Ferrari F154CB 3.9 L Turbo V8	D	109	+9 Laps
26	LMP3	15	(United Kingdom) RLR MSport	(Denmark) Christian Stubbe Olsen (United Kingdom) Martin Rich (Denmark) Martin Vedel Mortensen	Ligier JS P3	M	109	+9 Laps
26	LMP3	15	(United Kingdom) RLR MSport	(Denmark) Christian Stubbe Olsen (United Kingdom) Martin Rich (Denmark) Martin Vedel Mortensen	Nissan VK50VE 5.0 L V8	M	109	+9 Laps
27	LMP3	9	(Switzerland) Realteam Racing	(Switzerland) David Droux (Switzerland) Esteban García	Norma M30	M	109	+9 Laps
27	LMP3	9	(Switzerland) Realteam Racing	(Switzerland) David Droux (Switzerland) Esteban García	Nissan VK50VE 5.0 L V8	M	109	+9 Laps
28	LMGTE	51	(United States) Luzich Racing	(France) Fabien Lavergne (Denmark) Nicklas Nielsen (Italy) Alessandro Pier Guidi	Ferrari 488 GTE	D	109	+9 Laps
28	LMGTE	51	(United States) Luzich Racing	(France) Fabien Lavergne (Denmark) Nicklas Nielsen (Italy) Alessandro Pier Guidi	Ferrari F154CB 3.9 L Turbo V8	D	109	+9 Laps
29	LMGTE	55	(Switzerland) Spirit of Race	(United Kingdom) Duncan Cameron (Republic of Ireland) Matt Griffin (United Kingdom) Aaron Scott	Ferrari 488 GTE	D	108	+10 Laps
29	LMGTE	55	(Switzerland) Spirit of Race	(United Kingdom) Duncan Cameron (Republic of Ireland) Matt Griffin (United Kingdom) Aaron Scott	Ferrari F154CB 3.9 L Turbo V8	D	108	+10 Laps
30	LMGTE	66	(United Kingdom) JMW Motorsport	(Italy) Matteo Cressoni (Canada) Wei Lu (United States) Jeff Segal	Ferrari 488 GTE	D	106	+12 Laps
30	LMGTE	66	(United Kingdom) JMW Motorsport	(Italy) Matteo Cressoni (Canada) Wei Lu (United States) Jeff Segal	Ferrari F154CB 3.9 L Turbo V8	D	106	+12 Laps
31	LMGTE	77	(Germany) Dempsey-Proton Racing	(Italy) Matteo Cairoli (Italy) Riccardo Pera (Germany) Christian Ried	Porsche 911 RSR	D	93	+25 Laps
31	LMGTE	77	(Germany) Dempsey-Proton Racing	(Italy) Matteo Cairoli (Italy) Riccardo Pera (Germany) Christian Ried	Porsche 4.0 L Flat-6	D	93	+25 Laps
32	LMP2	45	(United Kingdom) Thunderhead Carlin Racing	(United Kingdom) Ben Barnicoat (United Kingdom) Harrison Newey (United Kingdom) Harry Tincknell	Dallara P217	D	79	Did not finish
32	LMP2	45	(United Kingdom) Thunderhead Carlin Racing	(United Kingdom) Ben Barnicoat (United Kingdom) Harrison Newey (United Kingdom) Harry Tincknell	Gibson GK428 4.2 L V8	D	79	Did not finish
33	LMP2	37	(Switzerland) Cool Racing	(Switzerland) Antonin Borga (Switzerland) Alexandre Coigny (France) Nicolas Lapierre	Oreca 07	M	77	Accident
33	LMP2	37	(Switzerland) Cool Racing	(Switzerland) Antonin Borga (Switzerland) Alexandre Coigny (France) Nicolas Lapierre	Gibson GK428 4.2 L V8	M	77	Accident
34	LMP2	30	(France) Duqueine Engineering	(United Kingdom) Richard Bradley (France) Nico Jamin (France) Pierre Ragues	Oreca 07	M	77	Accident
34	LMP2	30	(France) Duqueine Engineering	(United Kingdom) Richard Bradley (France) Nico Jamin (France) Pierre Ragues	Gibson GK428 4.2 L V8	M	77	Accident
35	LMP3	3	(United Kingdom) United Autosports	(United Kingdom) Christian England (United States) Michael Guasch	Ligier JS P3	M	63	Accident
35	LMP3	3	(United Kingdom) United Autosports	(United Kingdom) Christian England (United States) Michael Guasch	Nissan VK50VE 5.0 L V8	M	63	Accident
36	LMP2	43	(United Kingdom) RLR MSport	(Canada) John Farano (India) Arjun Maini (France) Matthieu Vaxivière	Oreca 07	D	56	Suspension
36	LMP2	43	(United Kingdom) RLR MSport	(Canada) John Farano (India) Arjun Maini (France) Matthieu Vaxivière	Gibson GK428 4.2 L V8	D	56	Suspension
37	LMP3	14	(Poland) Inter Europol Competition	(Germany) Paul Scheuschner (Belgium) Sam Dejonghe	Ligier JS P3	M	52	Did not finish
37	LMP3	14	(Poland) Inter Europol Competition	(Germany) Paul Scheuschner (Belgium) Sam Dejonghe	Nissan VK50VE 5.0 L V8	M	52	Did not finish
38	LMP3	10	(Italy) Oregon Team	(Italy) Lorenzo Bontempelli (Italy) Damiano Fioravanti (Lithuania) Gustas Grinbergas	Norma M30	M	32	Did not finish
38	LMP3	10	(Italy) Oregon Team	(Italy) Lorenzo Bontempelli (Italy) Damiano Fioravanti (Lithuania) Gustas Grinbergas	Nissan VK50VE 5.0 L V8	M	32	Did not finish
39	LMP2	22	(United Kingdom) United Autosports	(United Kingdom) Phil Hanson (Portugal) Filipe Albuquerque	Oreca 07	M	15	Power steering
39	LMP2	22	(United Kingdom) United Autosports	(United Kingdom) Phil Hanson (Portugal) Filipe Albuquerque	Gibson GK428 4.2 L V8	M	15	Power steering

European Le Mans Series
Previous race: Barcelona	2019 season	Next race: Spa-Francorchamps
