= United Autosports =

Racing team

(United Kingdom) (United States) United Autosports
- Founded: 2009
- Base: Wakefield, England, United Kingdom
- Team principal(s): Zak Brown, Richard Dean
- Current series: 24 Hours of Le Mans; FIA World Endurance Championship; European Le Mans Series; Le Mans Cup; IMSA SportsCar Championship; Asian Le Mans Series
- Former series: British LMP3 Cup; Tequila Patron North American Endurance Cup; GT Cup Championship; British GT; British Touring Car Championship; GT4 European Series; Extreme E Supercars Championship; Super2 Series
- Current drivers: European Le Mans Series (United Kingdom) Oliver Jarvis (Japan) Marino Sato (Brazil) Daniel Schneider (United Kingdom) Ben Hanley (Australia) Griffin Peebles (Switzerland) Grégoire Saucy (United Kingdom) Michael Birch (United Kingdom) Wayne Boyd (Australia) Garnet Patterson; Le Mans Cup (United Kingdom) Michael Birch (Australia) Garnet Patterson; 24 Hours of Le Mans (Denmark) Mikkel Jensen (Sweden) Rasmus Lindh (Switzerland) Grégoire Saucy (United Kingdom) Ben Hanley (United Kingdom) Oliver Jarvis (Brazil) Daniel Schneider; IMSA SportsCar Championship (Canada) Phil Fayer (Denmark) Mikkel Jensen (New Zealand) Hunter McElrea (United Kingdom) Ben Hanley (United Kingdom) Paul di Resta (United States) Dan Goldburg (Sweden) Rasmus Lindh (Switzerland) Grégoire Saucy; Asian Le Mans Series (Denmark) Mikkel Jensen (Italy) Giorgio Roda (Switzerland) Grégoire Saucy (United Kingdom) Paul di Resta (Canada) Phil Fayer (United Kingdom) Ben Hanley (United Kingdom) Wayne Boyd (Australia) Garnet Patterson (Australia) Mark Rosser (United Arab Emirates) Andrey Mukovoz (Slovenia) Alexey Nesov
- Website: unitedautosports.com

United Autosports is a sports car racing team based in Wakefield, England, United Kingdom, founded by businessman Zak Brown and former driver Richard Dean.

United Autosports has won the 24 Hours of Le Mans (LMP2 Class) twice – in 2020 and 2024. In 2025, United Autosports won the 24 Hours of Daytona. In 2020, United Autosports became the first ever team to win the 24 Hours of Le Mans (LMP2 Class) and two other endurance sports car championships in the same year – the FIA World Endurance Championship (LMP2) and the European Le Mans Series.

In 2023, United Autosports was announced as the official racing partner of McLaren Automotive in the FIA World Endurance Championship, fielding two McLaren GT3 EVOs in the LMGT3 category from 2024.

In June 2025, McLaren launched McLaren United AS in collaboration with United Autosports to run the manufacturer's LMDh programme in the FIA World Endurance Championship from 2027.

In 2025, United Autosports is contesting the FIA World Endurance Championship LMGT3 class with McLaren Automotive, the IMSA SportsCar Championship LMP2 class, European Le Mans Series in the LMP2, LMP2 Pro/Am and LMGT3 classes and the 2025/26 Asian Le Mans Series.

United Autosports also prepares and races a range of historic race cars in events across the world, such as the Rolex Monterey Motorsports Reunion and the Le Mans and Silverstone Classics.

Since the team's founding in 2009, United Autosports has competed in races around the world, including the Spa 24 Hours, the Bathurst 12 Hour, the Gulf 12 Hours, and the Dubai 24 Hour, along with entering championships such as the British Touring Car Championship, GT Cup, European Supercar Challenge, Ginetta GT4 Supercup, FIA GT3 European Championship, and Blancpain Endurance Series and the British GT Championship. The team has also raced in the Rolex 24 Hours of Daytona, Intercontinental Le Mans Cup, Macau GT Cup, and Petit Le Mans.

United Autosports has signed guest drivers including Fernando Alonso, Tom Kristensen, Mark Blundell, David Brabham, Martin Brundle, Eddie Cheever, Paul di Resta, Johnny Herbert, Stefan Johansson, Arie Luyendyk, Juan Pablo Montoya, Mahaveer Ragunathan, Bruno Senna, Markus Winkelhock and Lando Norris.

== History ==
=== 2010 ===
The team achieved podium finishes in the 2010 FIA GT3 European Championship, 24 Hours of Spa, 2010 1000 km of Zhuhai and the Macau Grand Prix.

=== 2011 ===
The team partnered with Michael Shank Racing for the 2011 Rolex 24 Hours of Daytona, finishing fourth in the Daytona prototype class. The Ford Riley Daytona Prototype was driven by Martin Brundle, Mark Blundell, Mark Patterson and Zak Brown.

United Autosports competed in the 2011 British GT Championship with Matt Bell, John Bintcliffe, Jay Palmer and Mike Guasch.

They also contested the FIA GT3 European Championship with Matt Bell, Zak Brown, Joe Osborne and Mark Patterson. That year they also entered 2011 Petit Le Mans, with drivers Mark Patterson, Stefan Johansson and Zak Brown.

=== 2012 ===
In January the team made its début in the Dubai 24 Hours with two Audi R8 LMS cars. The team also became one of the first customers for the McLaren MP4-12C GT3 and raced two examples in the Blancpain Endurance Series for drivers Zak Brown, Mark Blundell, Mark Patterson, Álvaro Parente, Matt Bell and David Brabham. Although still racing the Audi R8 LMS in the 2012 British GT Championship, they switched to McLarens for the final few rounds of the UK national series. United Autosports achieved the first win for the McLaren MP4-12C GT3 at Snetterton in the British GT Championship with Matt Bell and Charles Bateman behind the wheel. Further British GT Championship wins came for Bell and Bateman at Silverstone and also at Donington Park for Zak Brown and Álvaro Parente.

=== 2013 ===
In 2013, United Autosports once again entered the British GT Championship with two McLaren MP4-12C GT3 cars and their one remaining Audi R8 LMS ultra. Matt Bell and Mark Patterson came second in the championship after scoring three podiums and a win at the final round at Donington Park. They missed out on the title in their Audi by only half a point. However, this was the season when the team won its first championship title, with Jim and Glynn Geddie in the McLaren MP4-12C GT3 in the European Supercar Challenge.

=== 2014 ===
The new season saw United Autosports contest the British Touring Car Championship with a pair of Toyota Avensis Touring Cars and drivers James Cole and Glynn Geddie. The team also entered the 2014 Ginetta GT4 Supercup support race with Luke Davenport and Carl Breeze, winning the Team title at the end of the year.

United Autosports contested the GT Cup Championship in 2014 and won the overall and GTO Championship with Jim Geddie in his McLaren MP4-12C GT3. They also continued with their Audi R8 LMS ultra in the British GT Championship.

=== 2015 ===
The team returned to the GT Cup Championship in 2015 with the Audi R8 LMS ultra and driver Phil Burgan. They also put plans in place to move into prototype racing with two LMP3 cars in the European Le Mans Series.

=== 2016 ===
United Autosports made the team's début in the European Le Mans Series at Silverstone in April with a pair of Ligier JS P3 sports cars and drivers Alex Brundle, Mike Guasch, Christian England, Mark Patterson, Wayne Boyd and Matt Bell. The team won the first three races and scored eight podiums throughout the year, winning both the team and driver championships with one round remaining. The team also entered the inaugural Road to Le Mans race – one of the support races to the Le Mans 24 Hours – with former F1 driver Martin Brundle pairing up with Christian England. Brundle took pole position. American duo Guy Cosmo and Mike Hedlund were behind the wheel of the second Ligier, with Guy Cosmo scoring the fastest lap of the race and setting the LMP3 lap record round the Circuit de la Sarthe.

=== 2017 ===
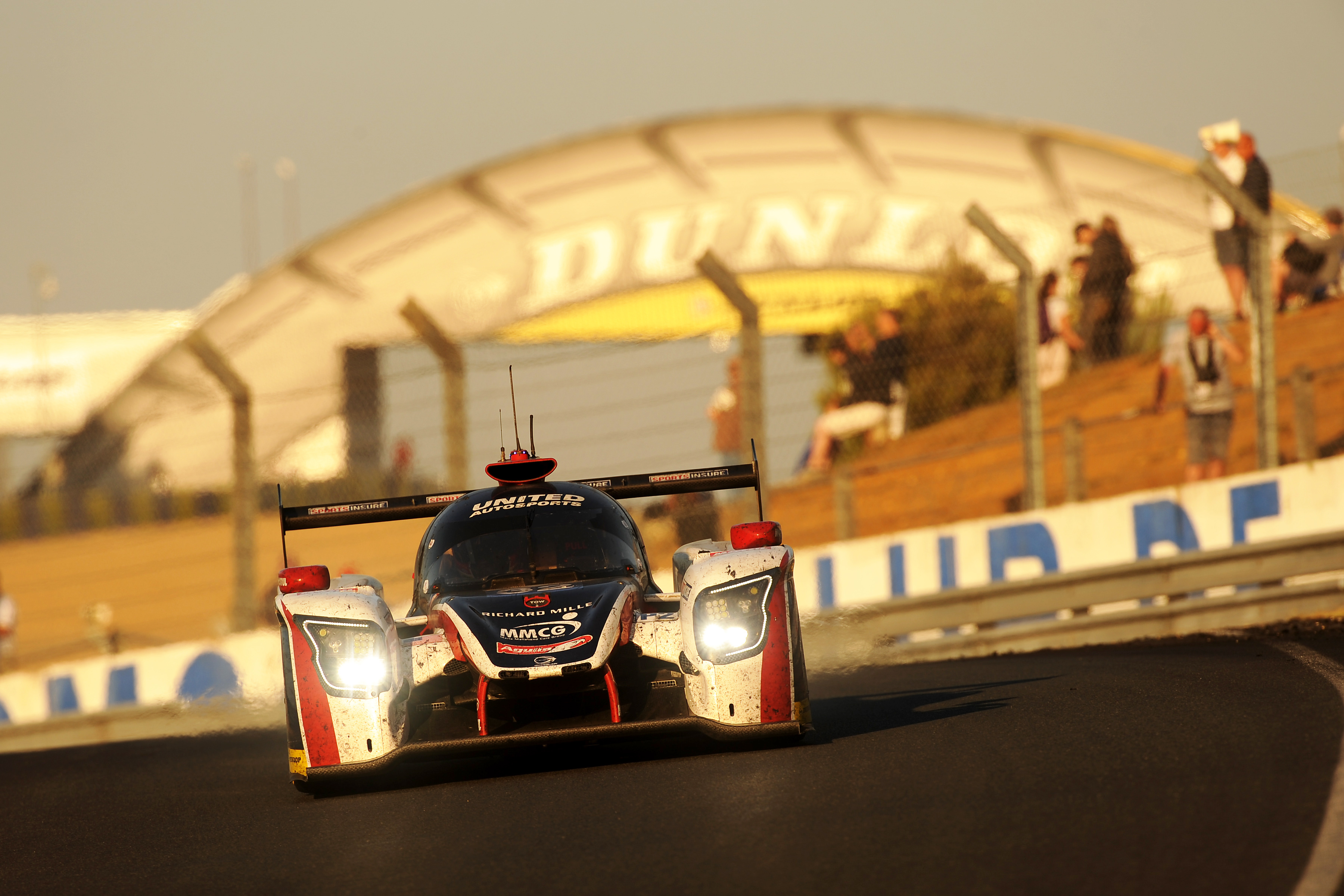
The United Autosports Ligier JSP217 co-driven by William Owen, Hugo de Sadeleer and Filipe Albuquerque. The car went on to finish the race in fifth place overall, fourth in LMP2.

United Autosports made the team's first appearance in LMP2 by entering a Ligier JS P217 in the 2017 European Le Mans Series. Filipe Albuquerque, Will Owen and Hugo de Sadeleer scored two race wins – three podiums in total – to finish runners-up in the championship standings. In June, the trio also combined to make United Autosport's Le Mans 24 Hours début, finishing fourth in the LMP2 class (fifth overall). The team also returned with their two Ligier JS P3 sports prototypes and defended its LMP3 ELMS title, courtesy of John Falb and Sean Rayhall (USA).

The UK-based team also entered Ligier LMP3 cars in the Michelin Le Mans Cup.

=== 2018 ===
Through a 25% shareholding in Walkinshaw Andretti United, United Autosports entered the 2018 Supercars Championship. The team is co-owned by Ryan Walkinshaw, son of Tom Walkinshaw of Tom Walkinshaw Racing and Michael Andretti's operation Andretti Autosport.

The team signed Formula 1 driver and two-time world champion Fernando Alonso, 2018 McLaren F1 test and reserve driver Lando Norris and ex-F1 and former DTM champion Paul Di Resta for the 2018 Rolex 24 Hours of Daytona. Di Resta, together with Hugo De Sadeleer, Will Owen and Bruno Senna, finished fourth overall.

Hugo de Sadeleer, Will Owen and Juan Pablo Montoya finished in third place at the 24 Hours of Le Mans in their Ligier JS P217. In the ELMS, United Autosports came fourth (LMP2) and third (LMP3) in the final Team's standings. The Anglo-American team made its début in the 2018–19 Asian Le Mans Series, winning the title with Phil Hanson and Paul Di Resta and claiming second in LMP3.

=== 2019 ===
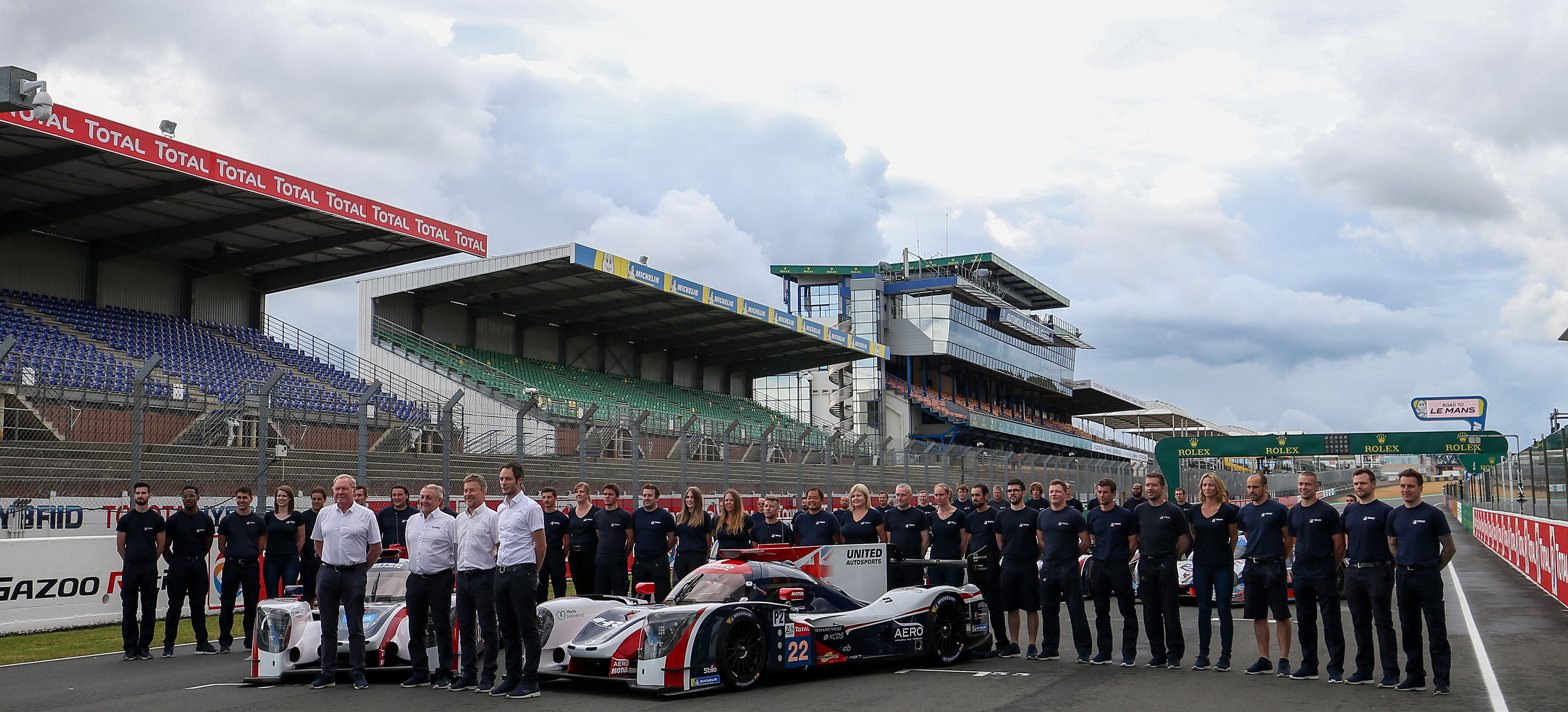
United Autosports in 2019 24 Hours of Le Mans

United finished fourth in both LMP2 and LMP3 in the European Le Mans Series Teams Championship.

The team contested the FIA World Endurance Championship for the first time, with an Oreca 07, Phil Hanson, Filipe Albuquerque and Paul Di Resta. They finished on the podium in Japan and China and won the LMP2 class for the first time in Bahrain

=== 2020 ===
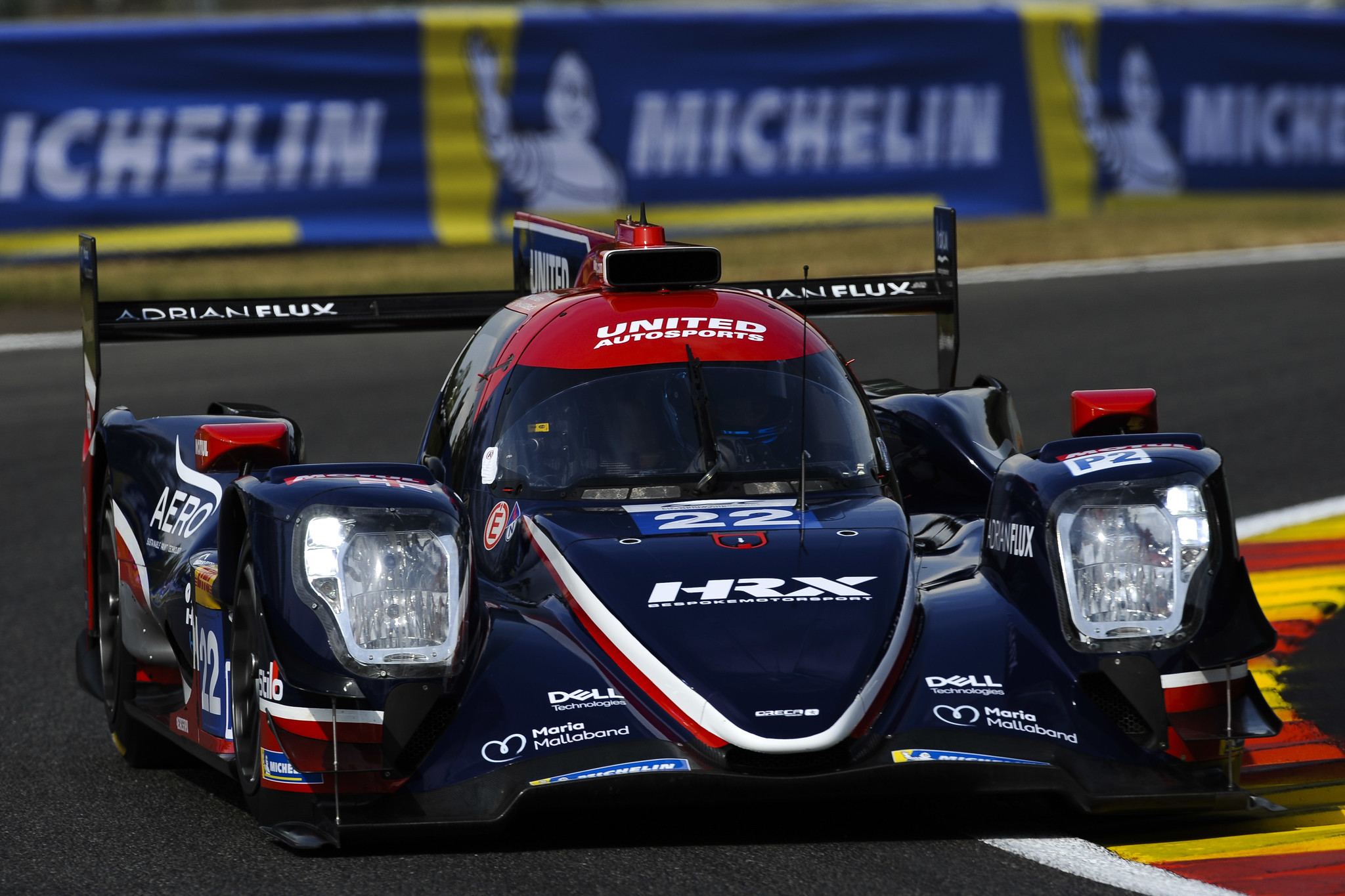
United Autosports won its third consecutive WEC LMP2 victory at Spa in August 2020.

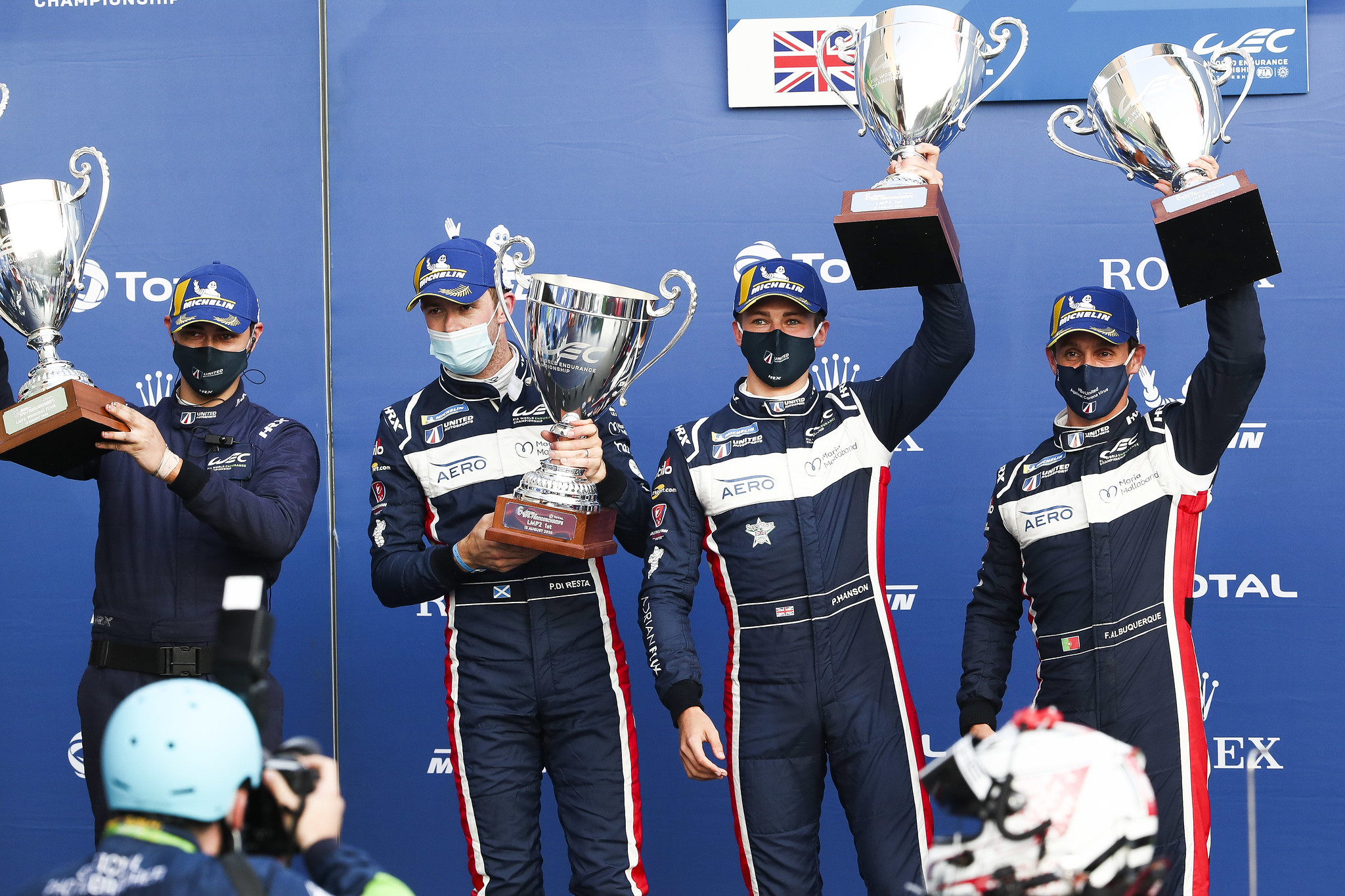
Paul Di Resta (second left), Phil Hanson and Filipe Albuquerque won the 2020 Spa 6 Hours WEC race in August.

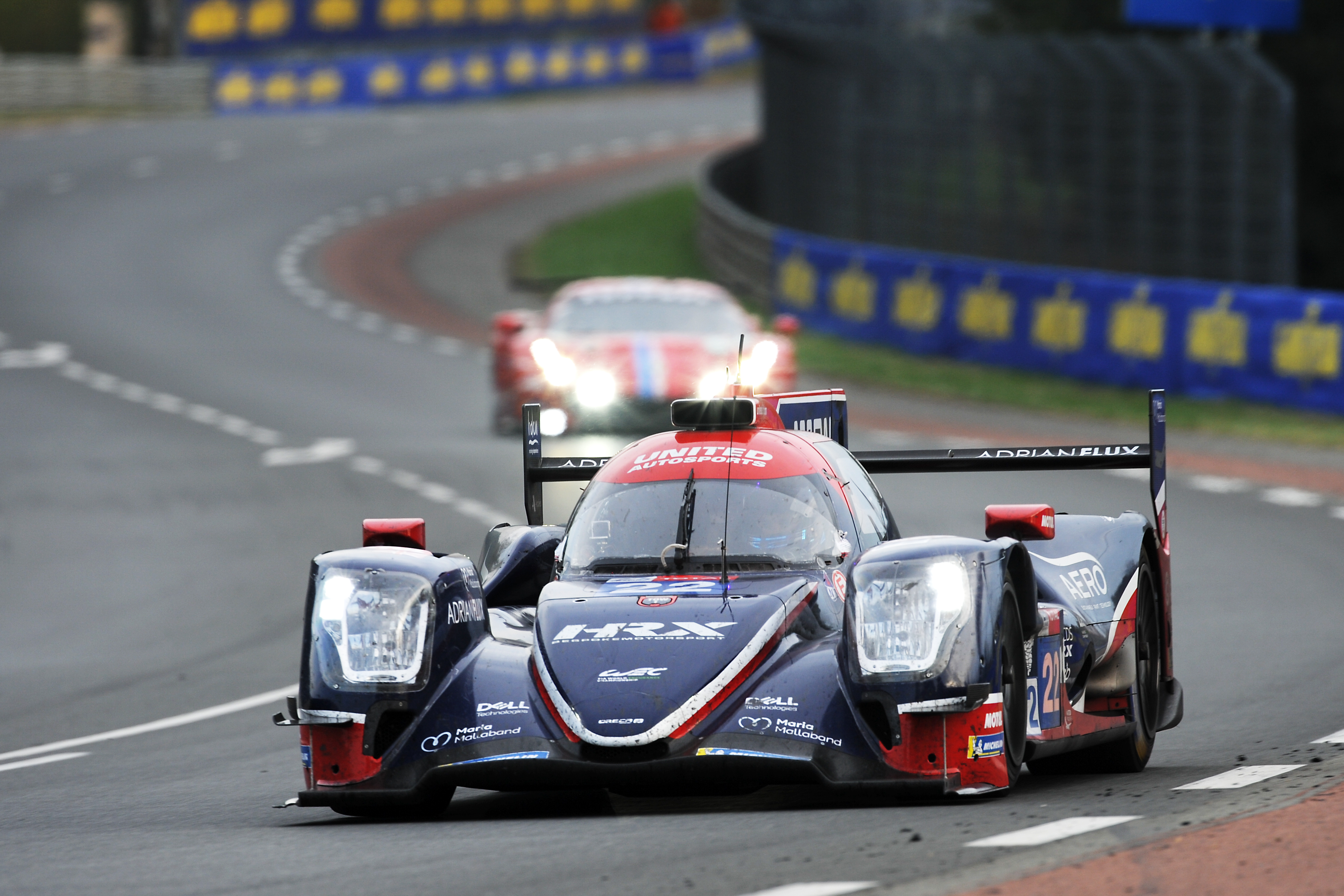
United Autosports secured the LMP2 class win in the Le Mans 24 Hours, delayed from June until September 2020, and thereby also took the WEC LMP2 title.

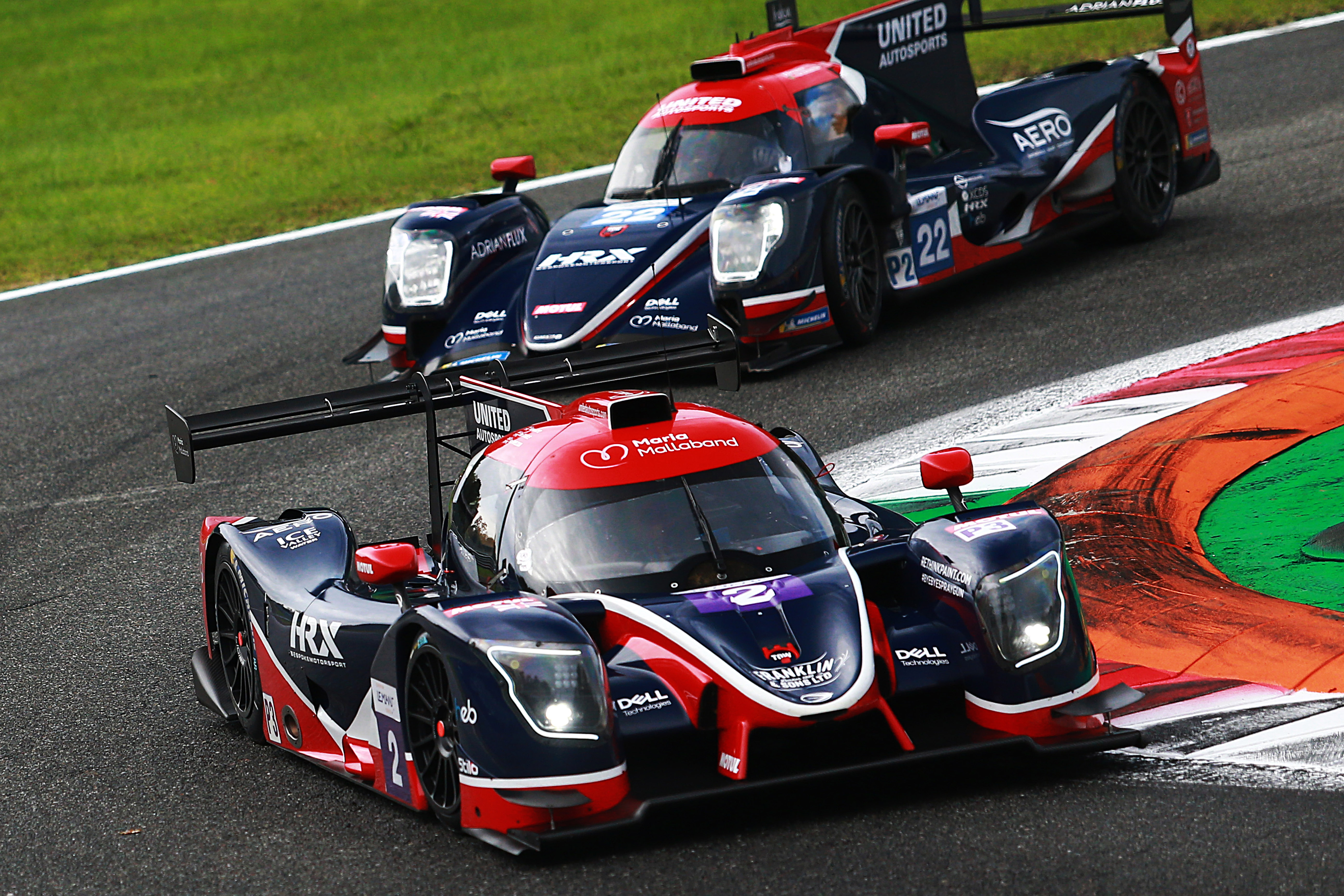
United Autosports secured the 2020 ELMS LMP3 Championship with drivers Wayne Boyd, Tom Gamble and Rob Wheldon.

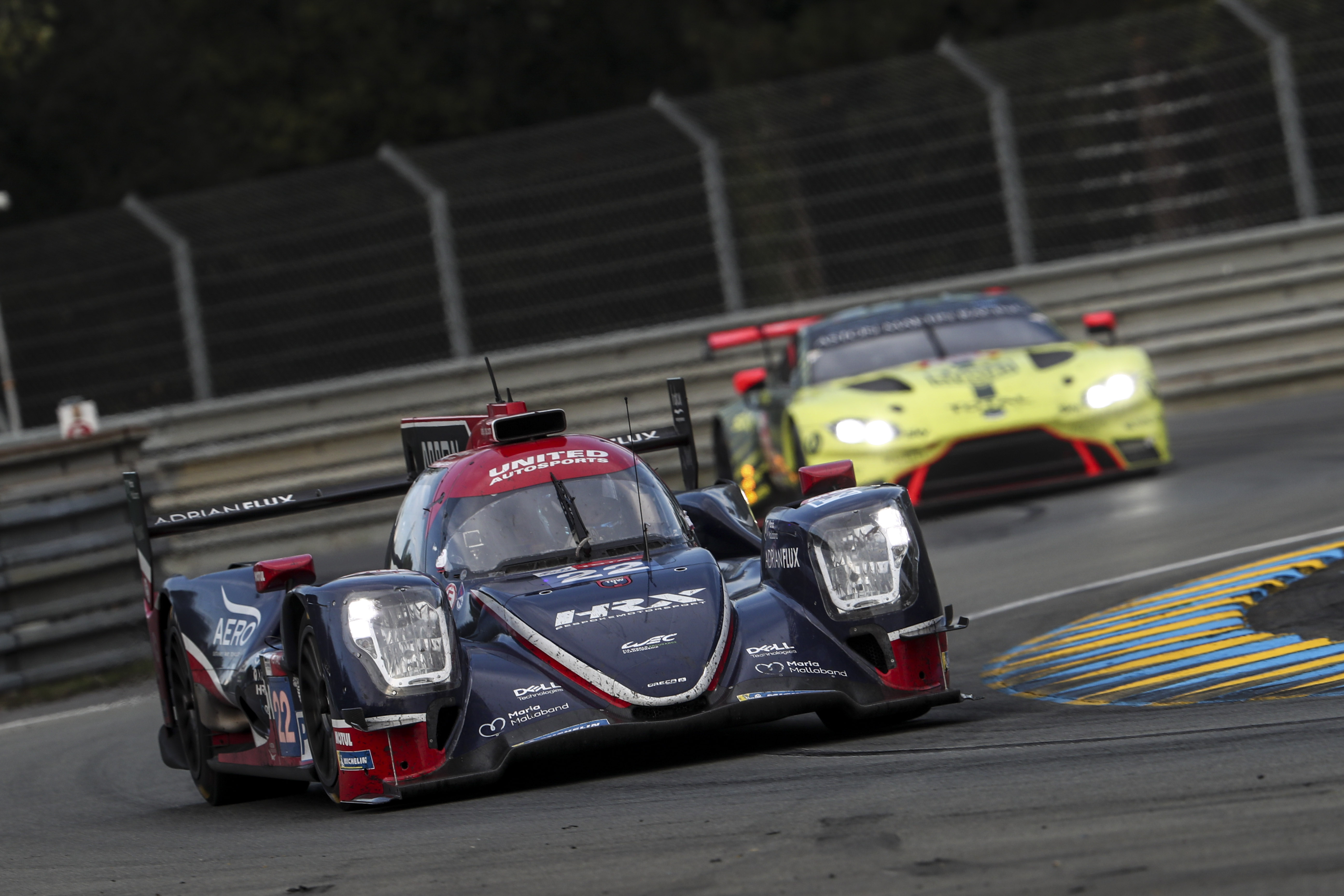
Paul Di Resta, Phil Hanson and Filipe Albuquerque won the LMP2 class for United Autosports in the 2020 Le Mans 24 Hours, September 2020.

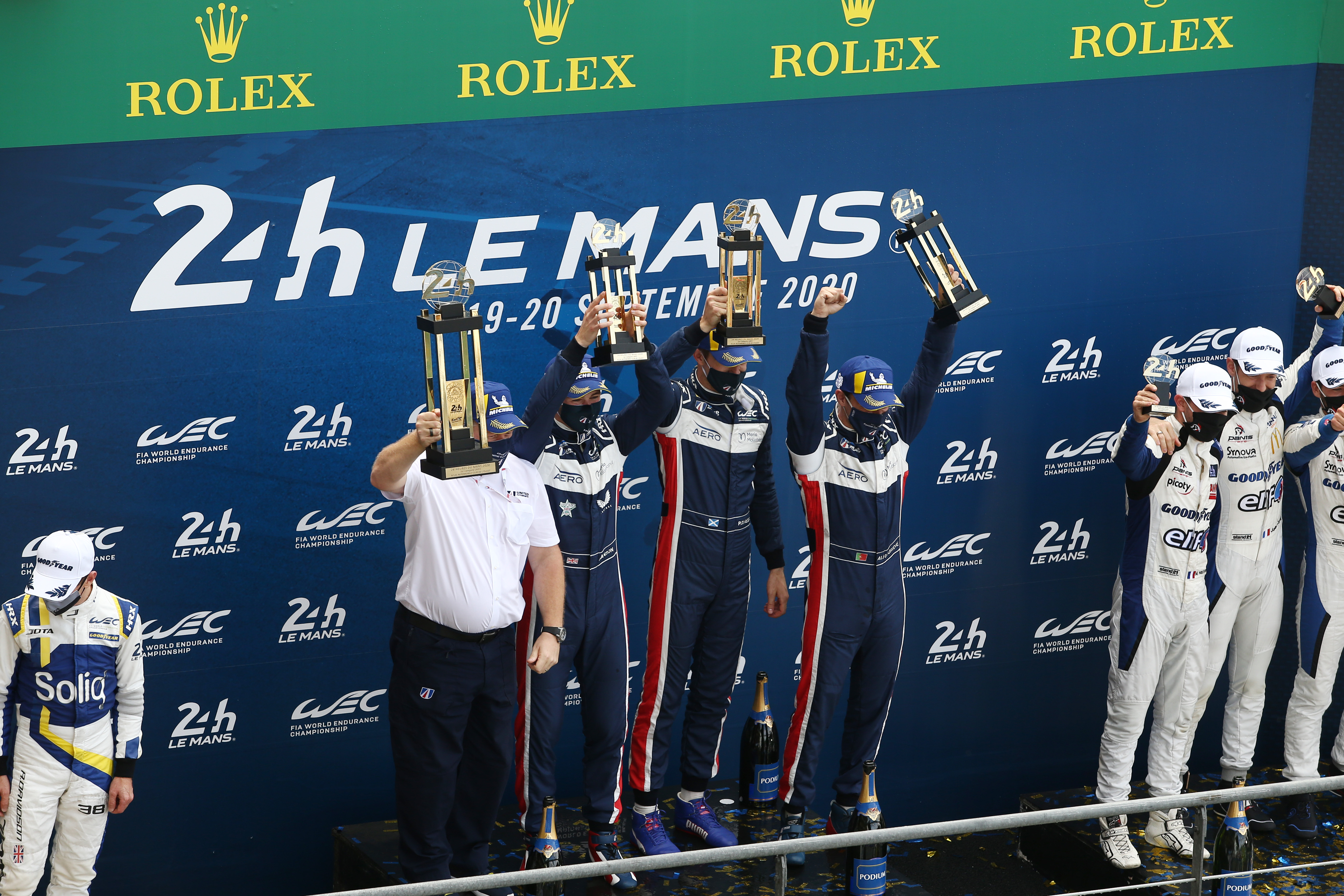
Paul Di Resta, Phil Hanson and Filipe Albuquerque on the podium to receive their trophies for clinching the LMP2 win in the 2020 Le Mans 24 Hours

United Autosports won at CoTA in February and took the lead of the WEC LMP2 Championship but racing was then suspended due to the Coronavirus pandemic (COVID-19 pandemic). The series resumed in August at Spa, where Hanson, Albuquerque and di Resta won. United Autosports then won the delayed Le Mans 24 Hours in September and took the LMP2 Championship with one race to go. United Autosports also won the European Le Mans Series Championship. Phil and Filipe became the first drivers to win the WEC, 24 Hours of Le Mans and ELMS championships in a single season and United became the first team to win the FIA World Endurance Championship (LMP2), European Le Mans Series and the Le Mans 24 Hours (LMP2) all in the same year. United Autosports also won the ELMS LMP3 Championship for the third time in five years with three wins, a third place podium and four poles.

In July 2020 United announced its entry into the Extreme E series with Andretti Autosport, creating Andretti United Extreme E.

United Autosports announced it would enter the GT4 European Series in 2021 with two McLaren 570S GT4 cars.

In September 2020, it was announced that the team purchased all of the defunct Strakka Racing team's assets, which included all of their race team equipment, race cars, trucks and their race team premises close to Silverstone circuit, for an undisclosed sum.

=== 2021 ===
In 2021, United Autosports took 36 podium finishes including 12 victories.

The team competed in the GT4 Euro Series for the first time, winning the Silver Teams' title. Bailey Voisin and Charlie Fagg claimed the Silver Driver's Award with Gus Bowers and Dean Macdonald taking fifth place.

In the European Le Mans Series LMP2 category, Phil Hanson, Tom Gamble and Jonathan Aberdein won the final race of the season at Portimão, taking second-place in the final Driver's standings. In the European Le Mans Series LMP3 category, Edouard Cauhaupe, Wayne Boyd and Rob Wheldon finished third overall.

In the FIA World Endurance Championship, Phil Hanson took fourth in the Endurance Trophy for LMP2 Drivers. United Autosports also came fourth in the Endurance Trophy for LMP2 Teams.

Extreme E was a new programme in 2021, which the team entered in partnership with Andretti as Andretti United Extreme E. Catie Munnings and Timmy Hansen were the drivers in the inaugural year of the eco-conscious championship. They won the 2021 Arctic X-Prix, finished fourth in the Teams' Championship standings overall, and Munnings and Hansen claimed third in the Driver's Championship.

=== 2022 ===
United Autosports opened the year at the 24 Hours of Daytona, before scoring two wins in the two Asian Le Mans Series Abu Dhabi races courtesy of Scotsman Paul Di Resta and team newcomer Josh Pierson – the American teenager unable to enter the first two races until he became 16-years-old due to regulations.

The team's two-car entry in the FIA World Endurance Championship achieved 10 top-six finishes throughout the season, which included first place in the opening Sebring race. Josh Pierson became the youngest driver to race and to finish a WEC race, going onto take another world record at the 24 Hours of Le Mans later that year as the youngest ever contender.

United Autosports also claimed third place (Phil Hanson, Tom Gamble, Duncan Tappy) in the European Le Mans Series LMP2 Teams Championship after registering four top-four results, including a victory.

=== 2023 ===
United Autosports kicked off the 2023 season at the Asian Le Mans Series, taking second place in the 4 Hours of Abu Dhabi Race 1.

The FIA World Endurance Championship started the first of seven rounds at Sebring International Raceway. This marked the last season that the LMP2 class would compete in the championship. United Autosports' two-car LMP2 entry collectively achieved four pole positions, one victory and four second place podiums. Filipe Albuquerque also won the Goodyear Tire and Rubber Company Wingfoot Award for the 2023 season.

In the European Le Mans Series, the #22 LMP2 of Oliver Jarvis, Phil Hanson and Marino Sato finished the year as vice-champions, winning an automatic invitation to the 24 Hours of Le Mans. The trio took three wins out of six races, the most of any LMP2 team in the championship.

Highlights from United Autosports' final season in the Le Mans Cup included LMP3 pole position for Josh Caygill in the Aragon Round and victory for John Schauerman and Wayne Boyd at Circuit de Spa-Francorchamps.

The historics team took a class victory for team bosses Zak Brown and Richard Dean at the Estoril Classics with the 1981 Porsche 935.

In September 2023, United Autosports announced the expansion of its USA racing programme with a new base in Mooresville, North Carolina, in anticipation of the team's first full season in the IMSA SportsCar Championship.

In October 2023, United Autosports was announced as the official racing partner of McLaren Automotive for the 2024 FIA World Endurance Championship, contesting the newly formed LMGT3 class.

=== 2024 ===
United Autosports USA started the season at the 24 Hours of Daytona with guest IndyCar Series drivers Pato O'Ward and Felix Rosenqvist. The team took LMP2 pole position for the first time at Daytona with Ben Keating in the special liveried #2 ORECA 07 which was named in the 10 best motorsport liveries in 2024 by Goodwood Road & Racing.

Throughout the rest of the IMSA season, United Autosports took their first IMSA win at Road America, two pole positions and a podium in the 12 Hours of Sebring.

In June, United Autosports won the 24 Hours of Le Mans for the second time, taking victory in the LMP2 class with Oliver Jarvis, Nolan Siegel and Bijoy Garg.

In the FIA World Endurance Championship, United Autosports delivered the first LMGT3 podium for McLaren Automotive in São Paulo and the first front row lock out for a manufacturer in the LMGT3 class at the season finale in Bahrain.

Highlights in the European Le Mans Series included pole position and a podium for the #22 LMP2 at the season opener in Barcelona.

In October, Zak Brown teamed up with Tom Kristensen for the Estoril Classics, taking third place in the Porsche 935.

=== 2025 ===
United Autosports achieved two podiums in the FIA World Endurance Championship, claiming second place in the opening round with Sébastien Baud, James Cottingham and Grégoire Saucy, and winning the Lone Star Le Mans with Sean Gelael, Darren Leung and Marino Sato.

In the European Le Mans Series, United Autosports achieved podiums in the LMP2 Pro-Am class at the 4 Hours of Spa-Francorchamps, and in the LMGT3 class at the final round.

In June, a drivetrain issue and an electrical fault led to both LMGT3 cars retiring from the 24 Hours of Le Mans. Both the LMP2 and LMP2 Pro-Am entries finished top ten in their classes, however, with #22 LMP2 finishing seventh in the LMP2 class, and #23 LMP2 Pro-Am finishing sixth in the LMP2 Pro-Am class.

United Autosports USA #22 LMP2 won in their class of the opening round of the IMSA SportsCar Championship, going on to claim another win in Watkins Glen and a podium in the Chevrolet Grand Prix.

Due to the upcoming McLaren Hypercar project, United Autosport stepped down from the FIA World Endurance Championship LMGT3 class, with Garage 59 taking over as McLaren's LMGT3 partner.

Chaz Mostert won the 2025 Supercars Championship driving for Walkinshaw Andretti United, claiming 1 win and 7 further podiums in the sprint cup. Mostert also won the inaugural Supercars Finals Series, claiming 3 wins and 3 further podiums. Walkinshaw Andretti United finished third in the team's championship.

United Autosports left their Supercars joint venture at the end of the year, with Walkinshaw Automotive Group and TWG Global, Andretti's parent company, coming to a mutual agreement to consolidate ownership and acquire United's shareholding. The team has rebranded as Walkinshaw TWG Racing.

=== Historic racing ===
Aside from their modern-day racing activities, United Autosports is also involved in historic racing and preparation of historic racing cars. The team's collection of cars spans many decades and race series and includes the 1991 Senna McLaren MP4/6, 1980 Alan Jones championship-winning Williams FW07 and a 1970 Jackie Stewart March 701. They also maintain and race sports cars such as the 1986 Porsche 962 and the JLP-3 Porsche 935. The team enters many historic events around the world, including the Rolex Monterey Motorsports Reunion, the Le Mans Classic, and the annual Silverstone Classic weekend, among others.

== Racing record ==
=== 24 Hours of Le Mans results ===
Year	Entrant	No	Car	Drivers	Class	Laps	Pos.	Class Pos.
2017	(United States) United Autosports	32	Ligier JS P217-Gibson	(Portugal) Filipe Albuquerque (United States) Will Owen (Switzerland) Hugo de Sadeleer	LMP2	362	5th	4th
2018	(United States) United Autosports	22	Ligier JS P217-Gibson	(Portugal) Filipe Albuquerque (United Kingdom) Paul di Resta (United Kingdom) Phil Hanson	LMP2	288	DNF	DNF
2018	(United States) United Autosports	32	Ligier JS P217-Gibson	(Colombia) Juan Pablo Montoya (United States) Will Owen (Switzerland) Hugo de Sadeleer	LMP2	365	7th	3rd
2019	(United States) United Autosports	22	Ligier JS P217-Gibson	(Portugal) Filipe Albuquerque (United Kingdom) Paul di Resta (United Kingdom) Phil Hanson	LMP2	365	9th	4th
2019	(United States) United Autosports	32	Ligier JS P217-Gibson	(United Kingdom) Alex Brundle (Republic of Ireland) Ryan Cullen (United States) Will Owen	LMP2	348	19th	14th
2020	(United Kingdom) United Autosports	22	Oreca 07-Gibson	(Portugal) Filipe Albuquerque (United Kingdom) Paul di Resta (United Kingdom) Phil Hanson	LMP2	370	5th	1st
2020	(United Kingdom) United Autosports	32	Oreca 07-Gibson	(United Kingdom) Alex Brundle (United States) Will Owen (Netherlands) Job van Uitert	LMP2	359	17th	13th
2021	(United Kingdom) United Autosports USA	22	Oreca 07-Gibson	(Portugal) Filipe Albuquerque (United Kingdom) Phil Hanson (Switzerland) Fabio Scherer	LMP2	328	40th	18th
2021	(United Kingdom) United Autosports	23	Oreca 07-Gibson	(United Kingdom) Wayne Boyd (United Kingdom) Paul di Resta (United Kingdom) Alex Lynn	LMP2	361	9th	4th
2021	(United Kingdom) United Autosports	32	Oreca 07-Gibson	(South Africa) Jonathan Aberdein (France) Nico Jamin (Venezuela) Manuel Maldonado	LMP2	75	DNF	DNF
2022	(United States) United Autosports USA	22	Oreca 07-Gibson	(Portugal) Filipe Albuquerque (United Kingdom) Phil Hanson (United States) Will Owen	LMP2	366	14th	10th
2022	(United States) United Autosports USA	23	Oreca 07-Gibson	(United Kingdom) Oliver Jarvis (United Kingdom) Alex Lynn (United States) Josh Pierson	LMP2	368	10th	6th
2023	(United Kingdom) United Autosports	22	Oreca 07-Gibson	(Portugal) Filipe Albuquerque (United Kingdom) Phil Hanson (United Kingdom) Frederick Lubin	LMP2	321	21st	11th
2023	(United Kingdom) United Autosports	23	Oreca 07-Gibson	(United Kingdom) Tom Blomqvist (United Kingdom) Oliver Jarvis (United States) Josh Pierson	LMP2	323	18th	8th
2024	(United States) United Autosports USA	23	Oreca 07-Gibson	(Portugal) Filipe Albuquerque (United Kingdom) Ben Hanley (United States) Ben Keating	LMP2 (Pro-Am)	272	42nd	6th
2024	(United Kingdom) United Autosports	22	Oreca 07-Gibson	(United States) Bijoy Garg (United Kingdom) Oliver Jarvis (United States) Nolan Siegel	LMP2	297	15th	1st
2024	(United Kingdom) United Autosports	59	McLaren 720S GT3 Evo	(Brazil) Nicolas Costa (United Kingdom) James Cottingham (Switzerland) Grégoire Saucy	LMGT3	220	DNF	DNF
2024	(United Kingdom) United Autosports	95	McLaren 720S GT3 Evo	(Japan) Hiroshi Hamaguchi (Chile) Nico Pino (Japan) Marino Sato	LMGT3	212	DNF	DNF
2025	(United Kingdom) United Autosports	22	Oreca 07-Gibson	(Brazil) Pietro Fittipaldi (Denmark) David Heinemeier Hansson (Netherlands) Renger van der Zande	LMP2	364	24th	5th
2025	(United Kingdom) United Autosports	23	Oreca 07-Gibson	(United Kingdom) Ben Hanley (United Kingdom) Oliver Jarvis (Brazil) Daniel Schneider	LMP2 (Pro-Am)	363	28th	6th
2025	(United Kingdom) United Autosports	59	McLaren 720S GT3 Evo	(France) Sébastien Baud (United Kingdom) James Cottingham (Switzerland) Grégoire Saucy	LMGT3	314	DNF	DNF
2025	(United Kingdom) United Autosports	95	McLaren 720S GT3 Evo	(Indonesia) Sean Gelael (United Kingdom) Darren Leung (Japan) Marino Sato	LMGT3	80	DNF	DNF
2026	(United Kingdom) United Autosports	22	Oreca 07-Gibson	(Denmark) Mikkel Jensen (Sweden) Rasmus Lindh (Switzerland) Grégoire Saucy	LMP2	358	22nd	8th
2026	(United Kingdom) United Autosports	222	Oreca 07-Gibson	(United Kingdom) Ben Hanley (United Kingdom) Oliver Jarvis (Brazil) Daniel Schneider	LMP2 (Pro-Am)	354	29th	7th

=== Complete FIA World Endurance Championship results ===
Year	Entrant	Class	Chassis	Engine	No	Drivers	1	2	3	4	5	6	7	8	Pos.	Pts
2019–20							SIL	FUJ	SHA	BHR	COA	SPA	LMN	BHR		
2019–20	(United Kingdom) United Autosports	LMP2	Oreca 07	Gibson GK428 4.2 L V8	22	(Portugal) Filipe Albuquerque (United Kingdom) Phil Hanson (United Kingdom) Paul di Resta (United Kingdom) Oliver Jarvis	Ret	3	3	1	1	1	1	4	1st	190
2021							SPA	POR	MON	LMN	BHR	BHR				
2021	(United States) United Autosports USA	LMP2	Oreca 07	Gibson GK428 4.2 L V8	22	(Portugal) Filipe Albuquerque (United Kingdom) Phil Hanson (United Kingdom) Paul di Resta (United Kingdom) Wayne Boyd (Switzerland) Fabio Scherer	1	3	1	10	4	4			4th	107
2022							SEB	SPA	LMN	MON	FUJ	BHR				
2022	(United States) United Autosports USA	LMP2	Oreca 07	Gibson GK428 4.2 L V8	22	(Portugal) Filipe Albuquerque (United Kingdom) Phil Hanson (United States) Will Owen	7	5	10	13	7	6			7th	50
2022	(United States) United Autosports USA	LMP2	Oreca 07	Gibson GK428 4.2 L V8	23	(United Kingdom) Oliver Jarvis (United States) Josh Pierson (United Kingdom) Paul di Resta (United Kingdom) Alex Lynn	1	6	6	5	5	2			3rd	113
2023							SEB	POR	SPA	LMN	MON	FUJ	BHR			
2023	(United Kingdom) United Autosports	LMP2	Oreca 07	Gibson GK428 4.2 L V8	22	(United Kingdom) Phil Hanson (United Kingdom) Frederick Lubin (Portugal) Filipe Albuquerque (United Kingdom) Ben Hanley	2	2	5	8	6	2	9		3rd	104
2023	(United Kingdom) United Autosports	LMP2	Oreca 07	Gibson GK428 4.2 L V8	23	(United Kingdom) Oliver Jarvis (United States) Josh Pierson (United Kingdom) Tom Blomqvist (Netherlands) Giedo van der Garde	Ret	1	2	6	4	4	8		5th	92
2024							QAT	ITA	SPA	LMS	SÃO	COA	FUJ	BHR		
2024	(United Kingdom) United Autosports	LMGT3	McLaren 720S GT3 Evo	McLaren M840T 4.0 L Turbo V8	59	(Brazil) Nicolas Costa (United Kingdom) James Cottingham (Switzerland) Grégoire Saucy	14	11	4	Ret	4	4	8	6	9th	52
2024	(United Kingdom) United Autosports	LMGT3	McLaren 720S GT3 Evo	McLaren M840T 4.0 L Turbo V8	95	(United Kingdom) Josh Caygill (Chile) Nico Pino (Japan) Marino Sato	13	6	Ret	Ret	3	7	17	8	14th	36
2025							QAT	ITA	SPA	LMS	SÃO	COA	FUJ	BHR		
2025	(United Kingdom) United Autosports	LMGT3	McLaren 720S GT3 Evo	McLaren M840T 4.0 L Turbo V8	59	(France) Sébastien Baud (United Kingdom) James Cottingham (Switzerland) Grégoire Saucy	2	14	15	NC	8	4	14	16	12th	43
2025	(United Kingdom) United Autosports	LMGT3	McLaren 720S GT3 Evo	McLaren M840T 4.0 L Turbo V8	95	(Indonesia) Sean Gelael (United Kingdom) Darren Leung (Japan) Marino Sato	7	9	Ret	Ret	9	1	11	9	11th	43

* Season still in progress

=== Complete European Le Mans Series results ===
Year	Entrant	Class	Chassis	Engine	No	Drivers	1	2	3	4	5	6	Pos.	Pts
2016							SIL	IMO	RBR	LEC	SPA	EST		
2016	(United States) United Autosports	LMP3	Ligier JS P3	Nissan VK56DE 5.0L V8	2	(United Kingdom) Alex Brundle (United Kingdom) Christian England (United States) Mike Guasch	1	1	1	3	2	11	1st	109.5
2016	(United States) United Autosports	LMP3	Ligier JS P3	Nissan VK56DE 5.0L V8	3	(United Kingdom) Wayne Boyd (United Kingdom) Matthew Bell (United States) Mark Patterson	2	7	14	11	3	2	4th	59
2017							SIL	MNZ	RBR	LEC	SPA	POR		
2017	(United States) United Autosports	LMP2	Ligier JS P217	Gibson GK428 4.2 L V8	32	(Portugal) Filipe Albuquerque (United States) Will Owen (Switzerland) Hugo de Sadeleer	1	6	1	5	4	2	2nd	98
2017	(United States) United Autosports	LMP3	Ligier JS P3	Nissan VK50VE 5.0 L V8	2	(United States) John Falb (United States) Sean Rayhall	1	9	2	1	3	2	1st	103
2017	(United States) United Autosports	LMP3	Ligier JS P3	Nissan VK50VE 5.0 L V8	3	(United Kingdom) Wayne Boyd (United Kingdom) Christian England (United States) Mark Patterson	3	4	Ret	Ret	5	1	3rd	63
2018							LEC	MNZ	RBR	SIL	SPA	POR		
2018	(United States) United Autosports	LMP2	Ligier JS P217	Gibson GK428 4.2 L V8	22	(United Kingdom) Phil Hanson (Brazil) Bruno Senna (Portugal) Filipe Albuquerque	12	10	3	Ret	1	1	4th	54
2018	(United States) United Autosports	LMP2	Ligier JS P217	Gibson GK428 4.2 L V8	32	(United Kingdom) Wayne Boyd (United States) Will Owen (Switzerland) Hugo de Sadeleer	9	11	15	10	6	3	10th	23
2018	(United States) United Autosports	LMP3	Ligier JS P3	Nissan VK50VE 5.0 L V8	2	(United States) John Falb (United States) Sean Rayhall (Australia) Scott Andrews	5	5	Ret	7	1	3	6th	53.5
2018	(United States) United Autosports	LMP3	Ligier JS P3	Nissan VK50VE 5.0 L V8	3	(United Kingdom) Matthew Bell (Canada) Garett Grist (United Kingdom) Anthony Wells	7	3	12	1	4	7	3rd	58.5
2019							LEC	MNZ	CAT	SIL	SPA	POR		
2019	(United Kingdom) United Autosports	LMP2	Ligier JS P217 Oreca 07 (Note: United Autosport No. 22 car switched to the Oreca 07 from the Silverstone Round onward, while the No. 32 car switched from the Spa-Francorchamps Round onward.)	Gibson GK428 4.2 L V8	22	(United Kingdom) Phil Hanson (United Kingdom) Paul di Resta (Portugal) Filipe Albuquerque	6	4	7	Ret	1	2	4th	71
2019	(United Kingdom) United Autosports	LMP2	Ligier JS P217 Oreca 07	Gibson GK428 4.2 L V8	32	(United Kingdom) Alex Brundle (Republic of Ireland) Ryan Cullen (United States) Will Owen	12	3	8	8	9	4	8th	37.5
2019	(United Kingdom) United Autosports	LMP3	Ligier JS P3	Nissan VK50VE 5.0 L V8	2	(United Kingdom) Wayne Boyd (Brazil) Tommy Erdos (Canada) Garett Grist	6	3	3	3	Ret	2	4th	71
2019	(United Kingdom) United Autosports	LMP3	Ligier JS P3	Nissan VK50VE 5.0 L V8	3	(United Kingdom) Christian England (United States) Mike Guasch (United Kingdom) Andrew Bentley	8	10	5	Ret	5	Ret	8th	25
2020							RIC	SPA	LEC	MNZ	POR			
2020	(United Kingdom) United Autosports	LMP2	Oreca 07	Gibson GK428 4.2 L V8	22	(Portugal) Filipe Albuquerque (United Kingdom) Phil Hanson	3	1	1	1	3		1st	109
2020	(United Kingdom) United Autosports	LMP2	Oreca 07	Gibson GK428 4.2 L V8	32	(United Kingdom) Alex Brundle (United States) Will Owen (Netherlands) Job van Uitert	1	5	8	2	4		2nd	70
2020	(United Kingdom) United Autosports	LMP3	Ligier JS P320	Nissan VK56DE 5.6 L V8	2	(United Kingdom) Wayne Boyd (United Kingdom) Tom Gamble (United Kingdom) Rob Wheldon	1	1	Ret	3	1		1st	94
2020	(United Kingdom) United Autosports	LMP3	Ligier JS P320	Nissan VK56DE 5.6 L V8	3	(United Kingdom) Andrew Bentley (United Kingdom) Duncan Tappy (United States) Jim McGuire	7	5	2	11	4		5th	46.5
2021							CAT	RBR	LEC	MNZ	SPA	POR		
2021	(United Kingdom) United Autosports	LMP2	Oreca 07	Gibson GK428 4.2 L V8	22	(South Africa) Jonathan Aberdein (United Kingdom) Tom Gamble (United Kingdom) Phil Hanson	3	7	2	2	8	1	2nd	86
2021	(United Kingdom) United Autosports	LMP2	Oreca 07	Gibson GK428 4.2 L V8	32	(France) Nico Jamin (Venezuela) Manuel Maldonado (Netherlands) Job van Uitert	9	16	3	WD	5	10	9th	28.5
2021	(United Kingdom) United Autosports	LMP3	Ligier JS P320	Nissan VK56DE 5.6 L V8	2	(United Kingdom) Wayne Boyd (France) Edouard Cauhaupe (United Kingdom) Rob Wheldon	13	6	3	2	3	2	3rd	75.5
2021	(United Kingdom) United Autosports	LMP3	Ligier JS P320	Nissan VK56DE 5.6 L V8	3	(United Kingdom) Andrew Bentley (United Kingdom) Duncan Tappy (United States) Jim McGuire	10	9	13	10	8	10	15th	11.5
2022							LEC	IMO	MNZ	CAT	SPA	POR		
2022	(United Kingdom) United Autosports	LMP2	Oreca 07	Gibson GK428 4.2 L V8	22	(United Kingdom) Tom Gamble (United Kingdom) Phil Hanson (United Kingdom) Duncan Tappy	7	2	4	4	1	Ret	3rd	73
2022	(United Kingdom) United Autosports	LMP3	Ligier JS P320	Nissan VK56DE 5.6 L V8	2	(United Kingdom) Josh Caygill (Germany) Finn Gehrsitz (United Kingdom) Bailey Voisin	2	Ret	5	9	Ret	2	7th	48
2022	(United Kingdom) United Autosports	LMP3	Ligier JS P320	Nissan VK56DE 5.6 L V8	3	(United Kingdom) Andrew Bentley (Netherlands) Kay van Berlo (United States) Jim McGuire	7	1	Ret	Ret	5	4	5th	53
2023							CAT	LEC	ARA	SPA	ALG	POR		
2023	(United States) United Autosports USA	LMP2	Oreca 07	Gibson GK428 4.2 L V8	22	(United Kingdom) Phil Hanson (United Kingdom) Oliver Jarvis (Japan) Marino Sato	6	7	1	5	1	1	2nd	100
2023	(United States) United Autosports USA	LMP2 Pro-Am	Oreca 07	Gibson GK428 4.2 L V8	21	(United Kingdom) Andy Meyrick (Brazil) Nelson Piquet Jr. (Brazil) Daniel Schneider (Portugal) Filipe Albuquerque	10	5	3	3	4	9	5th	55
2023	(United States) United Autosports USA	LMP2 Pro-Am	Oreca 07	Gibson GK428 4.2 L V8	23 (Note: Pro-Am in rounds 1-2, P2 in round 3.)	(United Kingdom) Paul di Resta (United States) Jim McGuire (United Kingdom) Guy Smith (Australia) Garnet Patterson	11	10	7 (Note: Ineligible for points.)				11th (Note: Pro-Am standings)	1
2024							BAR	LEC	IMO	SPA	MUG	POR		
2024	(United Kingdom) United Autosports	LMP2	Oreca 07	Gibson GK428 4.2 L V8	22	(United Kingdom) Ben Hanley (Japan) Marino Sato (Romania) Filip Ugran	3	5	11	9	11	10	10th	29
2024	(United Kingdom) United Autosports	LMP2	Oreca 07	Gibson GK428 4.2 L V8	23	(United Kingdom) Paul di Resta (United States) Bijoy Garg (Switzerland) Fabio Scherer	9	12	6	10	6	6	11th	27
2024	(United Kingdom) United Autosports	LMP2 Pro-Am	Oreca 07	Gibson GK428 4.2 L V8	21	(United Kingdom) Andy Meyrick (Brazil) Daniel Schneider (United Kingdom) Oliver Jarvis (Portugal) Filipe Albuquerque	7	3	7	6	4	Ret	6th	47
2025							BAR	LEC	IMO	SPA	SIL	POR		
2025	(United Kingdom) United Autosports	LMP2	Oreca 07	Gibson GK428 4.2 L V8	22	(United Kingdom) Ben Hanley (Venezuela) Manuel Maldonado (Switzerland) Grégoire Saucy	6	9	8	Ret	10	Ret	12th	15
2025	(United Kingdom) United Autosports	LMP2 Pro-Am	Oreca 07	Gibson GK428 4.2 L V8	21	(United Kingdom) Oliver Jarvis (Japan) Marino Sato (Brazil) Daniel Schneider	5	5	6	2	5	7	6th	62
2025	(United Kingdom) United Autosports	LMGT3	McLaren 720S GT3 Evo	McLaren M840T 4.0 L Turbo V8	23	(United Kingdom) Michael Birch (United Kingdom) Wayne Boyd (Australia) Garnet Patterson	11	11	10	Ret	Ret	2	12th	19

=== Complete Le Mans Cup results ===
Year	Entrant	Class	Chassis	No	Drivers	1	2	3	4	5	6	7	Pos.	Pts
2017						MNZ	LMS		RBR	LEC	SPA	POR		
2017	(United States) United Autosports	LMP3	Ligier JS P3	2	(United States) John Falb (United States) Sean Rayhall		1	2					NC†	NC†
2017	(United States) United Autosports	LMP3	Ligier JS P3	22	(United Kingdom) Matthew Bell (United States) James McGuire	10	7	16	8	13	6	3	6th	32
2017	(United States) United Autosports	LMP3	Ligier JS P3	23	(United Kingdom) Richard Meins (United Kingdom) Shaun Lynn (United Kingdom) Andrew Bentley	RET	22	19	10	6	RET	8	10th	14
2018						LEC	MNZ	LMS		RBR	SPA	POR		
2018	(United States) United Autosports	LMP3	Ligier JS P3	22	(United Kingdom) Matthew Bell (United States) James McGuire	11	13	36	22	9	13	12	20th	5
2018	(United States) United Autosports	LMP3	Ligier JS P3	23	(United Kingdom) Richard Meins (United Kingdom) Christian England (United Kingdom) Shaun Lynn	12	12	21	34	15	5	10	16th	13.5
2018	(United States) United Autosports	LMP3	Ligier JS P3	32	(United States) Najaf Husain (India) Mahaveer Raghunathan (United States) Colin Braun	13	10	13	36‡	8	15	2	11th	25
2018	(United States) United Autosports	LMP3	Ligier JS P3	33	(United States) John Falb (United States) Sean Rayhall			2	2				NC†	NC†
2019						LEC	MNZ	LMS		BAR	SPA	POR		
2019	(United Kingdom) United Autosports	LMP3	Ligier JS P3	22	(United Kingdom) Matthew Bell (United States) James McGuire	10	8	19	6	RET	11	10	17th	12
2019	(United Kingdom) United Autosports	LMP3	Ligier JS P3	23	(Canada) Garett Grist (United States) Rob Hodes	14	12	15	9	RET	8	8	16th	12.5
2019	(United Kingdom) United Autosports	LMP3	Ligier JS P3	24	(United Kingdom) Wayne Boyd (United States) Najaf Husain (United States) Mike Guasch	9	6	17	7	3			6th	29.5
2019	(United Kingdom) United Autosports	LMP3	Ligier JS P3	27	(France) Patrice Lafargue (France) Erik Maris			14	26‡				NC†	NC†
2020						RIC	SPA	LEC	LMS		MNZ	POR		
2020	(United Kingdom) United Autosports	LMP3	Ligier JS P320	22	(United States) Jim McGuire (United Kingdom) Duncan Tappy				13	9			NC†	NC†
2020	(United Kingdom) United Autosports	LMP3	Ligier JS P320	23	(United Kingdom) Wayne Boyd (United States) John Schnauerman	12	4	9	5	RET	9	4	8th	34.5
2020	(United Kingdom) United Autosports	LMP3	Ligier JS P320	24	(United Kingdom) Andy Meyrick (Brazil) Daniel Schneider	6	RET	3	4	10	RET	RET	9th	29.5
2020	(United Kingdom) United Autosports	LMP3	Ligier JS P320	25	(United Kingdom) Shaun Lynn (United Kingdom) Joe Macari				17	16			NC†	NC†
2021						BAR	LEC	MNZ	LMS		SPA	POR		
2021	(United Kingdom) United Autosports	LMP3	Ligier JS P320	22	(Australia) Scott Andrews (United States) Gerald Kraut	1	RET	1	9	RET	12	13	6th	52
2021	(United Kingdom) United Autosports	LMP3	Ligier JS P320	23	(United States) John Schnauerman (United Kingdom) Wayne Boyd (United Kingdom) Duncan Tappy	2	3	4	13	6	9	10	5th	52.5
2021	(United Kingdom) United Autosports	LMP3	Ligier JS P320	26	(United States) James McGuire (United Kingdom) Guy Smith				RET	27			NC†	NC†
2021	(United Kingdom) United Autosports	LMP3	Ligier JS P320	32	(United Kingdom) Andy Meyrick (Brazil) Daniel Schneider	RET	5	DNS	4	8	21	6	8th	35
2022						LEC	IMO	LMS		MNZ	SPA	POR		
2022	(United Kingdom) United Autosports	LMP3	Ligier JS P320	2	(United Kingdom) Max Lynn (United Kingdom) Shaun Lynn (United Kingdom) Andrew Haddon	25	20	25	24	15	21	22	31st	0
2022	(United Kingdom) United Autosports	LMP3	Ligier JS P320	21	(United States) James McGuire (United Kingdom) Guy Smith			RET	18				NC†	NC†
2022	(United Kingdom) United Autosports	LMP3	Ligier JS P320	22	(Australia) Scott Andrews (United States) Gerald Kraut	16	RET	3	17	RET	25	14	14th	15
2022	(United Kingdom) United Autosports	LMP3	Ligier JS P320	23	(United Kingdom) Wayne Boyd (United States) Josh Schauerman	13	2	4	23	11	14	10	9th	25
2022	(United Kingdom) United Autosports	LMP3	Ligier JS P320	32	(Brazil) Dan Schneider (Netherlands) Kay van Berlo (United Kingdom) Andy Meyrick	10	18	10	12	7	22	6	12th	16
2023						BAR	LMS		LEC	ARA	SPA	POR		
2023	(United Kingdom) United Autosports	LMP3	Ligier JS P320	20	(United Kingdom) Andy Meyrick (Brazil) Daniel Schneider		RET	DNS					NC†	NC†
2023	(United Kingdom) United Autosports	LMP3	Ligier JS P320	21	(United States) Jim McGuire (United Kingdom) Guy Smith		24	18					NC†	NC†
2023	(United Kingdom) United Autosports	LMP3	Ligier JS P320	22	(Australia) Scott Andrews (United States) Gerald Kraut	24	11	5	24		RET	24	18th	9
2023	(United Kingdom) United Autosports	LMP3	Ligier JS P320	22	(United Kingdom) Josh Caygill (Australia) Garnet Patterson					11			18th	9
2023	(United Kingdom) United Autosports	LMP3	Ligier JS P320	23	(United Kingdom) Wayne Boyd (United States) Josh Schauerman	16	13	19	5	RET	1	22	8th	35
2026						BAR	LEC	LMS	SPA	SIL	POR			
2026	(United Kingdom) United Autosports	GT3	McLaren 720S GT3 Evo	95	(United Kingdom) Micheal Birch (Australia) Garnet Patterson								*	*

^{†} Ineligible for points.

^{‡} Did not finish, but was classified as had completed more than 90% of the race distance.

^{*} Season still in progress.

=== Complete IMSA SportsCar Championship results ===
Year	Entrant	Class	Chassis	Engine	No	Drivers	1	2	3	4	5	6	7	8	9	10	Pos.	Pts.	EC
2018							DAY	SEB	LBH	MOH	DET	WGI	MOS	ELK	LGA	ATL			
2018	(United States) United Autosports	P	Ligier JS P217	Gibson GK428 4.2 L V8	23	(Spain) Fernando Alonso (United Kingdom) Phil Hanson (United Kingdom) Lando Norris	13										19th	18	8
2018	(United States) United Autosports	P	Ligier JS P217	Gibson GK428 4.2 L V8	32	(United Kingdom) Paul di Resta (Brazil) Bruno Senna 3 (United Kingdom) Phil Hanson 2 (United States) Will Owen 1 (Switzerland) Hugo de Sadeleer 1 (United Kingdom) Alex Brundle 1	4	5				4					15th	82	23
2021							DAY	SEB	WGL1	WGL2	ELK	LGA	PET						
2021	(United States) United Autosports USA	LMP2	Oreca 07	Gibson GK428 4.2 L V8	22	(United Kingdom) Wayne Boyd (United States) James McGuire (United Kingdom) Guy Smith		5†	3				4				5th	920	18
2021							DAY	SEB	MDO	WGL1	WGL2	ELK	PET						
2021	(United States) United Autosports USA	LMP3	Ligier JS P320	Nissan VK56DE 5.6 L V8	2	(Germany) Niklas Krütten (France) Edouard Cauhaupé 5 (United States) Austin McCusker 5 (United Kingdom) Andy Meyrick 12 (United Kingdom) Tom Gamble 12				5			6				8th	580	10
2022							DQR	DAY	SEB	LGA	MOH	WGI	ELK	ATL					
2022	(United States) United Autosports	LMP2	Oreca 07	Gibson GK428 4.2 L V8	22	(United States) James McGuire (United Kingdom) Guy Smith (United Kingdom) Phil Hanson 1 (United States) Will Owen 1 (United Kingdom) Duncan Tappy 1	9	6	5								8th	284	14
2024							DAY	SEB	WGI	MOS	ELK	IMS	ATL						
2024	(United States) United Autosports USA	LMP2	Oreca 07	Gibson GK428 4.2 L V8	2	(United Kingdom) Ben Hanley (United States) Ben Keating (Chile) Nico Pino 5 (Mexico) Pato O'Ward 1	6	10	8	4	1	9	10				5th	1962	30
2024	(United States) United Autosports USA	LMP2	Oreca 07	Gibson GK428 4.2 L V8	22	(United States) Dan Goldburg (United Kingdom) Paul di Resta 6 (United States) Bijoy Garg 5 (Sweden) Felix Rosenqvist 1 (Portugal) Felipe Albuquerque 1	11	3	5	5	11	7	9				7th	1884	31
2025							DAY	SEB	WGI	MOS	ELK	IMS	ATL						
2025	(United States) United Autosports USA	LMP2	Oreca 07	Gibson GK428 4.2 L V8	2	(United Kingdom) Ben Hanley (United States) Nick Boulle 5 (United States) Juan Manuel Correa 4 (Canada) Phil Fayer 2 (United Kingdom) Oliver Jarvis 1	11	5	10	4	4	6	9				7th	1899	30
2025	(United States) United Autosports USA	LMP2	Oreca 07	Gibson GK428 4.2 L V8	22	(United States) Dan Goldburg (United Kingdom) Paul di Resta 6 (Sweden) Rasmus Lindh 5 (Australia) James Allen 1 (United Kingdom) Tom Blomqvist 1	1	8	1	2	14	4	11				4th	2117	40
2026*							DAY	SEB	WGI	MOS	ELK	IMS	ATL						
2026*	(United States) United Autosports USA	LMP2	Oreca 07	Gibson GK428 4.2 L V8	2	(Canada) Phil Fayer (United Kingdom) Ben Hanley (Denmark) Mikkel Jensen (New Zealand) Hunter McElrea	10	1									3rd*	604*	17*
2026*	(United States) United Autosports USA	LMP2	Oreca 07	Gibson GK428 4.2 L V8	22	(United States) Dan Goldburg (Sweden) Rasmus Lindh (United Kingdom) Paul di Resta (Switzerland) Grégoire Saucy	4	2									1st*	662*	20*

^{†} Post-event penalty. Car moved to back of class.

^{*} Season still in progress

=== Complete Asian Le Mans Series results ===
Year	Entrant	Class	Chassis	Engine	No	Drivers	1	2	3	4	5	6	Pos.	Pts.
2018-19							SHA	FUJ	CHA	SEP				
2018-19	(United States) United Autosports	LMP2	Ligier JS P2	Nissan VK45DE 4.5 L V8	22	(United Kingdom) Phil Hanson (United Kingdom) Paul di Resta	2	2	1	2			1st	80
2018-19	(United States) United Autosports	LMP2	Ligier JS P2	Nissan VK45DE 4.5 L V8	23	(United States) Patrick Byrne (United States) Guy Cosmo (Turkey) Salih Yoluç	3	5	6	RET			4th	33
2018-19	(United States) United Autosports	LMP3	Ligier JS P3	Nissan VK50VE 5.0 L V8	2	(United Kingdom) Wayne Boyd (United Kingdom) Chris Buncombe (Canada) Garett Grist	2	5	1	2			2nd	70
2018-19	(United States) United Autosports	LMP3	Ligier JS P3	Nissan VK50VE 5.0 L V8	3	(United Kingdom) Matthew Bell (Netherlands) Kay van Berlo (United States) Jim McGuire (United Kingdom) Christian England	6	1	5	5			4th	53
2021							DUB		ABU					
2021	(United Kingdom) United Autosports	LMP3	Ligier JS P320	Nissan VK56DE 5.0 L V8	2	(United Kingdom) Robert Wheldon (United Kingdom) Ian Loggie (United Kingdom) Andy Meyrick	4	2	RET	3			4th	45
2021	(United Kingdom) United Autosports	LMP3	Ligier JS P320	Nissan VK56DE 5.0 L V8	3	(United Kingdom) Andrew Bentley (United States) Jim McGuire (United Kingdom) Duncan Tappy	3	5	3	2			2nd	58
2021	(United Kingdom) United Autosports	LMP3	Ligier JS P320	Nissan VK56DE 5.0 L V8	23	(United Kingdom) Wayne Boyd (Venezuela) Manuel Maldonado (Finland) Rory Penttinen	1	1	Ret	1			1st	77
2022							DUB		ABU					
2022	(United Kingdom) United Autosports	LMP2	Oreca 07	Gibson GK428 4.2 L V8	23	(United States) Josh Pierson (United Kingdom) Paul di Resta			1	1			NC†	NC†
2023							DUB		ABU					
2023	(United Kingdom) United Autosports	LMP2	Oreca 07	Gibson GK428 4.2 L V8	22	(United Kingdom) Paul di Resta (United Kingdom) Phil Hanson (United States) James McGuire	5	7	5	7			8th	36
2023	(United Kingdom) United Autosports	LMP2	Oreca 07	Gibson GK428 4.2 L V8	23	(United Kingdom) Oliver Jarvis (Australia) Garnet Patterson (Australia) Yasser Shahin	6	8	2	6			7th	38
2025-26							SEP		DUB		ABU			
2025-26	(United Kingdom) United Autosports	LMP2	Oreca 07	Gibson GK428 4.2 L V8	5	(Denmark) Mikkel Jensen (Italy) Giorgio Roda (Switzerland) Grégoire Saucy	5	6	6	RET	RET	7	7th	37
2025-26	(United Kingdom) United Autosports	LMP2	Oreca 07	Gibson GK428 4.2 L V8	6	(United Kingdom) Paul di Resta (Canada) Phil Fayer (United Kingdom) Ben Hanley	7	14	RET	8	6	5	10th	28
2025-26	(United Kingdom) United Autosports	GT	McLaren 720S GT3 Evo	McLaren M840T 4.0 L Turbo V8	59	(United Kingdom) Wayne Boyd (Australia) Garnet Patterson (Australia) Mark Rosser (United Arab Emirates) Andrey Mukovoz (Slovenia) Alexey Nesov	13	16	16	7	15	6	12th	14

† Ineligble for points.
