= Christian England =

British racing driver

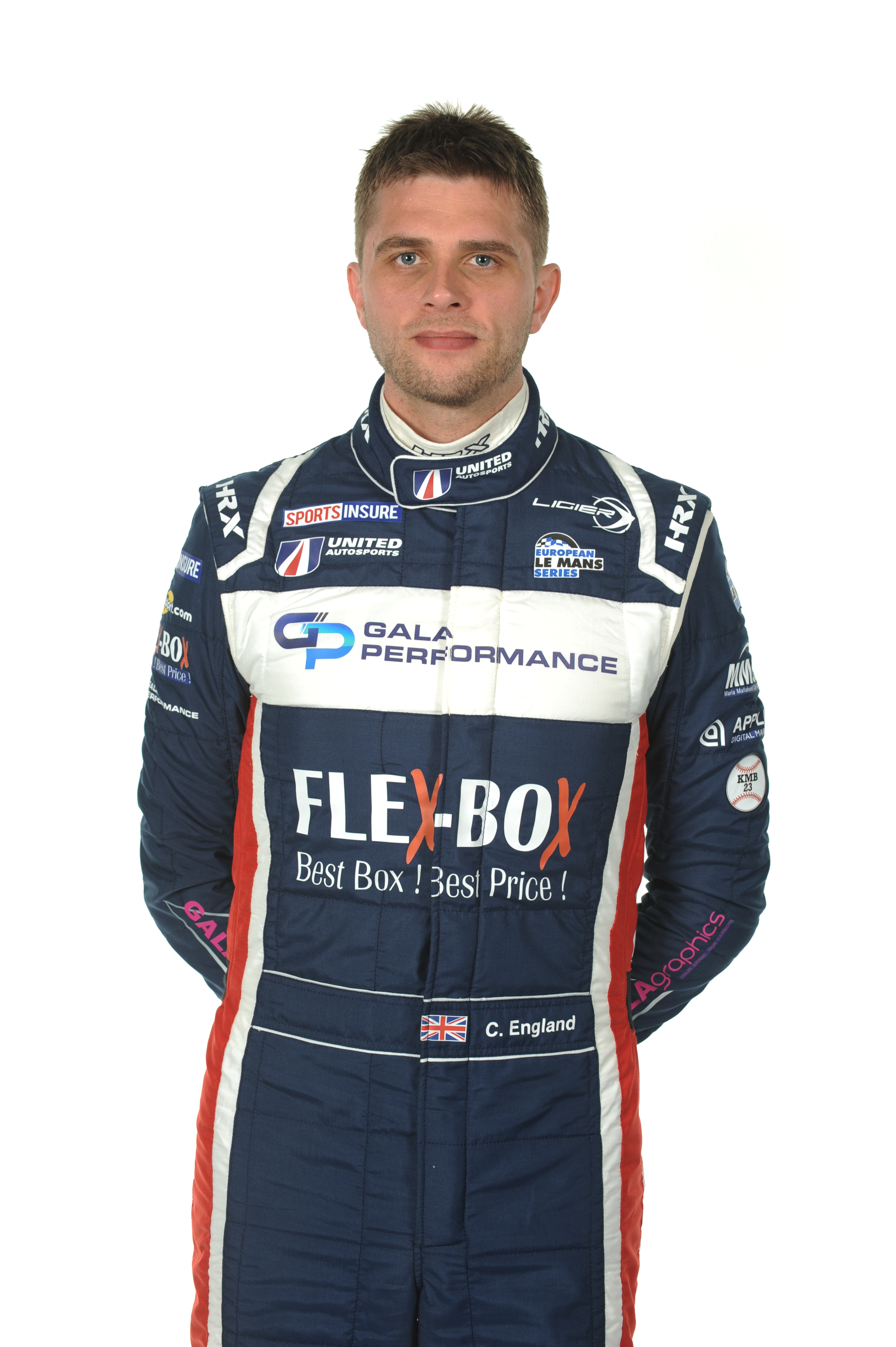
- England in 2017
- Nationality: British
- Born: 26 September 1981 (age 45) Barnsley, England
- Current team: United Autosports
- Categorisation: FIA Bronze (until 2017); FIA Silver (2018–)
- Best finish: 1st in 2016 European Le Mans Series LMP3

Previous series
- 2016 2016 2003 2002 2002 2002 2001 2001 2001 2001 2000: European Le Mans Series LMP3; Road to Le Mans LMP3; Formula 3 Britain National Class; UK Formula Ford Zetec Championship; Formula Ford Festival; Formula Ford Festival - Heats/Semi; Formula Ford Festival; Slick 50 Formula Ford Championship; Avon Tyres Formula Ford Eurotour - Class 1 Formula Ford Festival - Heats/Semi; Formula Ford Great Britain

Christian England (born 26 September 1981) is a British professional racing driver born and residing in Barnsley, South Yorkshire, England.

== Racing career ==
Professional Motorsport racing driver Christian England grew up on Park Road, Silkstone, Barnsley, South Yorkshire. He found his passion for the sport on Wombwell's go karting track, on Station Road, aged just eight years of age.

Go karting turned into motor racing and in 2002 and 2003, England established himself as a rising talent in 2001 when he signed for Richard Dean's JLR British Formula Ford concern. A second season in 2002 brought six race wins and a second place in the championship, beaten narrowly by Westley Barber. England career was starting to take off when he was nominated for the Young Driver 2002 McLaren Autosport BRDC Award. A Formula Three deal awaited, and from then on the plan was to ascend the racing ladder to Formula One. However this never happened and England was beaten to the McLaren Autosport BRDC Award by DTM racer Jamie Green. England's last race was the British Formula Three Championship with the Promatecme team, this was the last time England drove a single-seater race car for over a decade as England walked away from the sport in 2003 due to lack of funding. To progress his career, England joined the family hotel business. In 2016, England received a call from Richard Dean and Zak Brown of United Autosports offering him a place on the European Le Mans Series LMP3 team if he could secure sponsorship funding from Gala Performance. England achieved second place in the Road to Le Mans pairing with Martin Brundle then went on to win the 2016 European Le Mans Series LMP3 alongside Mike Guasch and Alex Brundle.
