= 2022 4 Hours of Portimao =

Endurance sportscar racing event

The layout of the Algarve International Circuit

The 2022 4 Hours of Portimão was an endurance sportscar racing event that was held on 16 October 2022, as the sixth and final round of the 2022 European Le Mans Series.

In LMP2, the race was won by the #9 Prema Racing run Oreca 07-Gibson, driven by Louis Delétraz, Ferdinand Habsburg and Juan Manuel Correa.

In LMP3, the race was won by the #17 Cool Racing run Ligier JS P320, driven by Mike Benham, Malthe Jakobsen and Maurice Smith.

In LMGTE, the race was won by the #83 Iron Lynx run Ferrari 488 GTE Evo, driven by Sarah Bovy, Michelle Gatting and Doriane Pin.

== Qualifying ==
=== Qualifying Result ===
Pole position in each class are marked in bold.

Pos	Class	No.	Team	Time	Grid
1	**LMP2 Pro-Am**	**34**	**Racing Team Turkey**	**1:32.375**	1
2	**LMP2**	**9**	**(Italy) Prema Racing**	**1:32.447**	2
3	LMP2 Pro-Am	47	(Portugal) Algarve Pro Racing	1:32.551	3
4	LMP2	65	(France) Panis Racing	1:32.592	4
5	LMP2	22	(United Kingdom) United Autosports	1:32.638	5
6	LMP2 Pro-Am	31	(France) TDS Racing x Vaillante	1:32.742	6
7	LMP2	43	(Poland) Inter Europol Competition	1:32.787	7
8	LMP2	28	(France) IDEC Sport	1:32.878	8
9	LMP2 Pro-Am	88	(Italy) AF Corse	1:32.920	9
10	LMP2 Pro-Am	24	(United Kingdom) Nielsen Racing	1:32.934	10
11	LMP2	37	(Switzerland) Cool Racing	1:33.032	11
12	LMP2	35	(United Kingdom) BHK Motorsport	1:33.120	12
13	LMP2	21	(Belgium) Mühlner Motorsport	1:33.137	13
14	LMP2 Pro-Am	51	(Poland) Team Virage	1:33.218	14
15	LMP2	30	(France) Duqueine Team	1:33.374	15
16	LMP2	19	(Portugal) Algarve Pro Racing	1:33.421	16
17	**LMP3**	**17**	**(Switzerland) Cool Racing**	**1:37.100**	17
18	LMP3	13	(Poland) Inter Europol Competition	1:37.275	18
19	LMP3	3	(United Kingdom) United Autosports	1:37.570	19
20	LMP3	4	(Luxembourg) DKR Engineering	1:37.676	20
21	LMP3	27	(Switzerland) Cool Racing	1:37.806	21
22	LMP3	15	(United Kingdom) RLR Msport	1:37.883	22
23	LMP3	10	(Italy) EuroInternational	1:37.886	23
24	LMP3	2	(United Kingdom) United Autosports	1:37.923	24
25	LMP3	14	(Poland) Inter Europol Competition	1:38.149	25
26	LMP3	5	(United Kingdom) RLR Msport	1:38.153	26
27	LMP3	6	(United Kingdom) 360 Racing	1:38.228	27
28	LMP3	7	(United Kingdom) Nielsen Racing	1:38.579	28
29	LMP3	11	(Italy) EuroInternational	1:38.689	29
30	**LMGTE**	**83**	**(Italy) Iron Lynx**	**1:41.888**	30
31	LMGTE	66	(United Kingdom) JMW Motorsport	1:41.916	31
32	LMGTE	32	(Germany) Rinaldi Racing	1:42.015	32
33	LMGTE	69	Oman Racing with TF Sport	1:42.084	33
34	LMGTE	77	(Germany) Proton Competition	1:42.273	34
35	LMGTE	93	(Germany) Proton Competition	1:42.585	35
36	LMGTE	57	(Switzerland) Kessel Racing	1:42.651	36
37	LMGTE	33	(Germany) Rinaldi Racing	1:43.457	37
38	LMGTE	60	(Italy) Iron Lynx	1:43.644	38
39	LMGTE	95	Oman Racing with TF Sport	1:44.408	39
40	LMGTE	18	(Hong Kong) Absolute Racing	1:45.299	40

== Race ==
=== Race Result ===
Class winners are marked in bold and ‡. - Cars failing to complete 70% of the winner's distance are marked as Not Classified (NC).

Pos.	Class	No.	Team	Drivers	Chassis	Tyre	Laps	Time/Retired
Pos.	Class	No.	Team	Drivers	Engine	Tyre	Laps	Time/Retired
1	**LMP2**	**9**	**(Italy) Prema Racing**	**(United States) Juan Manuel Correa** **(Switzerland) Louis Delétraz** **(Austria) Ferdinand Habsburg**	**Oreca 07**	G	**126**	**4:00:17.688‡**
1	**LMP2**	**9**	**(Italy) Prema Racing**	**(United States) Juan Manuel Correa** **(Switzerland) Louis Delétraz** **(Austria) Ferdinand Habsburg**	**Gibson GK428 4.2 L V8**	G	**126**	**4:00:17.688‡**
2	LMP2	65	(France) Panis Racing	(France) Julien Canal (France) Nico Jamin (Netherlands) Job van Uitert	Oreca 07	G	126	+49.262
2	LMP2	65	(France) Panis Racing	(France) Julien Canal (France) Nico Jamin (Netherlands) Job van Uitert	Gibson GK428 4.2 L V8	G	126	+49.262
3	LMP2	37	(Switzerland) Cool Racing	(France) Nicolas Lapierre (Germany) Niklas Krütten (China) Ye Yifei	Oreca 07	G	126	+51.296
3	LMP2	37	(Switzerland) Cool Racing	(France) Nicolas Lapierre (Germany) Niklas Krütten (China) Ye Yifei	Gibson GK428 4.2 L V8	G	126	+51.296
4	LMP2	43	(Poland) Inter Europol Competition	(Switzerland) Fabio Scherer (Brazil) Pietro Fittipaldi (Denmark) David Heinemeier Hansson	Oreca 07	G	125	+1 Lap
4	LMP2	43	(Poland) Inter Europol Competition	(Switzerland) Fabio Scherer (Brazil) Pietro Fittipaldi (Denmark) David Heinemeier Hansson	Gibson GK428 4.2 L V8	G	125	+1 Lap
5	LMP2	19	(Portugal) Algarve Pro Racing	(Romania) Filip Ugran (Netherlands) Bent Viscaal	Oreca 07	G	125	+1 Lap
5	LMP2	19	(Portugal) Algarve Pro Racing	(Romania) Filip Ugran (Netherlands) Bent Viscaal	Gibson GK428 4.2 L V8	G	125	+1 Lap
6	**LMP2 Pro-Am**	**34**	**Racing Team Turkey**	**(Turkey) Salih Yoluç** **(Republic of Ireland) Charlie Eastwood** **(United Kingdom) Will Stevens**	**Oreca 07**	G	**125**	**+1 Lap‡**
6	**LMP2 Pro-Am**	**34**	**Racing Team Turkey**	**(Turkey) Salih Yoluç** **(Republic of Ireland) Charlie Eastwood** **(United Kingdom) Will Stevens**	**Gibson GK428 4.2 L V8**	G	**125**	**+1 Lap‡**
7	LMP2	28	(France) IDEC Sport	(France) Paul Lafargue (France) Paul-Loup Chatin (France) Patrick Pilet	Oreca 07	G	124	+2 Laps
7	LMP2	28	(France) IDEC Sport	(France) Paul Lafargue (France) Paul-Loup Chatin (France) Patrick Pilet	Gibson GK428 4.2 L V8	G	124	+2 Laps
8	LMP2 Pro-Am	88	(Italy) AF Corse	(France) François Perrodo (Denmark) Nicklas Nielsen (Italy) Alessio Rovera	Oreca 07	G	124	+2 Laps
8	LMP2 Pro-Am	88	(Italy) AF Corse	(France) François Perrodo (Denmark) Nicklas Nielsen (Italy) Alessio Rovera	Gibson GK428 4.2 L V8	G	124	+2 Laps
9	LMP2	30	(France) Duqueine Team	(Mexico) Memo Rojas (France) Mathieu de Barbuat (United Kingdom) Richard Bradley	Oreca 07	G	124	+2 Laps
9	LMP2	30	(France) Duqueine Team	(Mexico) Memo Rojas (France) Mathieu de Barbuat (United Kingdom) Richard Bradley	Gibson GK428 4.2 L V8	G	124	+2 Laps
10	LMP2 Pro-Am	24	(United Kingdom) Nielsen Racing	(United States) Rodrigo Sales (United Kingdom) Matt Bell (United Kingdom) Ben Hanley	Oreca 07	G	122	+4 Laps
10	LMP2 Pro-Am	24	(United Kingdom) Nielsen Racing	(United States) Rodrigo Sales (United Kingdom) Matt Bell (United Kingdom) Ben Hanley	Gibson GK428 4.2 L V8	G	122	+4 Laps
11	LMP2 Pro-Am	31	(France) TDS Racing x Vaillante	(France) Philippe Cimadomo (Switzerland) Mathias Beche (Netherlands) Tijmen van der Helm	Oreca 07	G	121	+5 Laps
11	LMP2 Pro-Am	31	(France) TDS Racing x Vaillante	(France) Philippe Cimadomo (Switzerland) Mathias Beche (Netherlands) Tijmen van der Helm	Gibson GK428 4.2 L V8	G	121	+5 Laps
12	**LMP3**	**17**	**(Switzerland) Cool Racing**	**(United States) Maurice Smith** **(United Kingdom) Mike Benham** **(Denmark) Malthe Jakobsen**	**Ligier JS P320**	MI	**121**	**+5 Laps‡**
12	**LMP3**	**17**	**(Switzerland) Cool Racing**	**(United States) Maurice Smith** **(United Kingdom) Mike Benham** **(Denmark) Malthe Jakobsen**	**Nissan VK56DE 5.6 L V8**	MI	**121**	**+5 Laps‡**
13	LMP3	2	(United Kingdom) United Autosports	(United Kingdom) Bailey Voisin (United Kingdom) Josh Caygill (Germany) Finn Gehrsitz	Ligier JS P320	MI	120	+6 Laps
13	LMP3	2	(United Kingdom) United Autosports	(United Kingdom) Bailey Voisin (United Kingdom) Josh Caygill (Germany) Finn Gehrsitz	Nissan VK56DE 5.6 L V8	MI	120	+6 Laps
14	LMP2	35	(United Kingdom) BHK Motorsport	(Italy) Francesco Dracone (Italy) Sergio Campana (Germany) Markus Pommer	Oreca 07	G	119	+7 Laps
14	LMP2	35	(United Kingdom) BHK Motorsport	(Italy) Francesco Dracone (Italy) Sergio Campana (Germany) Markus Pommer	Gibson GK428 4.2 L V8	G	119	+7 Laps
15	LMP3	27	(Switzerland) Cool Racing	(Switzerland) Nicolas Maulini (France) Jean-Ludovic Foubert (France) Antoine Doquin	Ligier JS P320	MI	119	+7 Laps
15	LMP3	27	(Switzerland) Cool Racing	(Switzerland) Nicolas Maulini (France) Jean-Ludovic Foubert (France) Antoine Doquin	Nissan VK56DE 5.6 L V8	MI	119	+7 Laps
16	LMP3	3	(United Kingdom) United Autosports	(Netherlands) Kay van Berlo (United States) James McGuire (United Kingdom) Andrew Bentley	Ligier JS P320	MI	119	+7 Laps
16	LMP3	3	(United Kingdom) United Autosports	(Netherlands) Kay van Berlo (United States) James McGuire (United Kingdom) Andrew Bentley	Nissan VK56DE 5.6 L V8	MI	119	+7 Laps
17	LMP3	5	(United Kingdom) RLR MSport	(Denmark) Michael Jensen (United Kingdom) Nick Adcock (United Kingdom) Alex Kapadia	Ligier JS P320	MI	119	+7 Laps
17	LMP3	5	(United Kingdom) RLR MSport	(Denmark) Michael Jensen (United Kingdom) Nick Adcock (United Kingdom) Alex Kapadia	Nissan VK56DE 5.6 L V8	MI	119	+7 Laps
18	LMP3	4	(Luxembourg) DKR Engineering	(Mexico) Sebastián Álvarez (United Arab Emirates) Alexander Bukhantsov (Belgium) Tom Van Rompuy	Duqueine M30 – D08	MI	119	+7 Laps
18	LMP3	4	(Luxembourg) DKR Engineering	(Mexico) Sebastián Álvarez (United Arab Emirates) Alexander Bukhantsov (Belgium) Tom Van Rompuy	Nissan VK56DE 5.6 L V8	MI	119	+7 Laps
19	**LMGTE**	**83**	**(Italy) Iron Lynx**	**(France) Doriane Pin** **(Denmark) Michelle Gatting** **(Belgium) Sarah Bovy**	**Ferrari 488 GTE Evo**	G	**118**	**+8 Laps‡**
19	**LMGTE**	**83**	**(Italy) Iron Lynx**	**(France) Doriane Pin** **(Denmark) Michelle Gatting** **(Belgium) Sarah Bovy**	**Ferrari F154CB 3.9 L Turbo V8**	G	**118**	**+8 Laps‡**
20	LMP3	15	(United Kingdom) RLR MSport	(Austria) Horst Felbemayr Jr. (Germany) Valentino Catalano (United States) Austin McCusker	Ligier JS P320	MI	118	+8 Laps
20	LMP3	15	(United Kingdom) RLR MSport	(Austria) Horst Felbemayr Jr. (Germany) Valentino Catalano (United States) Austin McCusker	Nissan VK56DE 5.6 L V8	MI	118	+8 Laps
21	LMGTE	69	Oman Racing with TF Sport	(Oman) Ahmad Al Harthy (Denmark) Marco Sørensen (United Kingdom) Sam De Haan	Aston Martin Vantage AMR	G	117	+9 Laps
21	LMGTE	69	Oman Racing with TF Sport	(Oman) Ahmad Al Harthy (Denmark) Marco Sørensen (United Kingdom) Sam De Haan	Aston Martin 4.0 L Turbo V8	G	117	+9 Laps
22	LMGTE	57	(Switzerland) Kessel Racing	(Japan) Takeshi Kimura (Denmark) Frederik Schandorff (Denmark) Mikkel Jensen	Ferrari 488 GTE Evo	G	117	+9 Laps
22	LMGTE	57	(Switzerland) Kessel Racing	(Japan) Takeshi Kimura (Denmark) Frederik Schandorff (Denmark) Mikkel Jensen	Ferrari F154CB 3.9 L Turbo V8	G	117	+9 Laps
23	LMGTE	60	(Italy) Iron Lynx	(Italy) Claudio Schiavoni (Italy) Matteo Cressoni (Italy) Davide Rigon	Ferrari 488 GTE Evo	G	117	+9 Laps
23	LMGTE	60	(Italy) Iron Lynx	(Italy) Claudio Schiavoni (Italy) Matteo Cressoni (Italy) Davide Rigon	Ferrari F154CB 3.9 L Turbo V8	G	117	+9 Laps
24	LMGTE	77	(Germany) Proton Competition	(Germany) Christian Ried (Italy) Lorenzo Ferrari (Italy) Gianmaria Bruni	Porsche 911 RSR-19	G	116	+10 Laps
24	LMGTE	77	(Germany) Proton Competition	(Germany) Christian Ried (Italy) Lorenzo Ferrari (Italy) Gianmaria Bruni	Porsche 4.2 L Flat-6	G	116	+10 Laps
25	LMP3	14	(Poland) Inter Europol Competition	(France) Noam Abramczyk (Poland) Mateusz Kaprzyk (Canada) James Dayson	Ligier JS P320	MI	116	+10 Laps
25	LMP3	14	(Poland) Inter Europol Competition	(France) Noam Abramczyk (Poland) Mateusz Kaprzyk (Canada) James Dayson	Nissan VK56DE 5.6 L V8	MI	116	+10 Laps
26	LMGTE	18	(Hong Kong) Absolute Racing	(Indonesia) Andrew Haryanto (Estonia) Martin Rump (Belgium) Alessio Picariello	Porsche 911 RSR-19	G	116	+10 Laps
26	LMGTE	18	(Hong Kong) Absolute Racing	(Indonesia) Andrew Haryanto (Estonia) Martin Rump (Belgium) Alessio Picariello	Porsche 4.2 L Flat-6	G	116	+10 Laps
27	LMGTE	66	(United Kingdom) JMW Motorsport	(Italy) Giacorno Petrobelli (Singapore) Sean Hudspeth (New Zealand) Matthew Payne	Ferrari 488 GTE Evo	G	116	+10 Laps
27	LMGTE	66	(United Kingdom) JMW Motorsport	(Italy) Giacorno Petrobelli (Singapore) Sean Hudspeth (New Zealand) Matthew Payne	Ferrari F154CB 3.9 L Turbo V8	G	116	+10 Laps
28	LMGTE	93	(Germany) Proton Competition	(Republic of Ireland) Michael Fassbender (Canada) Zacharie Robichon (Austria) Richard Lietz	Porsche 911 RSR-19	G	116	+10 Laps
28	LMGTE	93	(Germany) Proton Competition	(Republic of Ireland) Michael Fassbender (Canada) Zacharie Robichon (Austria) Richard Lietz	Porsche 4.2 L Flat-6	G	116	+10 Laps
29	LMGTE	32	(Germany) Rinaldi Racing	(Germany) Pierre Ehret (Argentina) Nicolás Varrone (Italy) Diego Alessi	Ferrari 488 GTE Evo	G	115	+11 Laps
29	LMGTE	32	(Germany) Rinaldi Racing	(Germany) Pierre Ehret (Argentina) Nicolás Varrone (Italy) Diego Alessi	Ferrari F154CB 3.9 L Turbo V8	G	115	+11 Laps
30	LMP3	10	(Italy) Eurointernational	(Spain) Xavier Lloveras (Portugal) Miguel Cristóvão	Ligier JS P320	MI	115	+11 Laps
30	LMP3	10	(Italy) Eurointernational	(Spain) Xavier Lloveras (Portugal) Miguel Cristóvão	Nissan VK56DE 5.6 L V8	MI	115	+11 Laps
DNF	LMP3	13	(Poland) Inter Europol Competition	(United States) Charles Crews (Chile) Nico Pino (Portugal) Guilherme Oliveira	Ligier JS P320	MI	113	
DNF	LMP3	13	(Poland) Inter Europol Competition	(United States) Charles Crews (Chile) Nico Pino (Portugal) Guilherme Oliveira	Nissan VK56DE 5.6 L V8	MI	113	
DNF	LMGTE	95	Oman Racing with TF Sport	(United Kingdom) John Hartshorne (Portugal) Henrique Chaves (United Kingdom) Jonathan Adam	Aston Martin Vantage AMR	G	110	
DNF	LMGTE	95	Oman Racing with TF Sport	(United Kingdom) John Hartshorne (Portugal) Henrique Chaves (United Kingdom) Jonathan Adam	Aston Martin 4.0 L Turbo V8	G	110	
DNF	LMP2	22	(United Kingdom) United Autosports	(United Kingdom) Philip Hanson (United Kingdom) Tom Gamble (United Kingdom) Duncan Tappy	Oreca 07	G	95	
DNF	LMP2	22	(United Kingdom) United Autosports	(United Kingdom) Philip Hanson (United Kingdom) Tom Gamble (United Kingdom) Duncan Tappy	Gibson GK428 4.2 L V8	G	95	
NC	LMP2 Pro-Am	51	(Poland) Team Virage	(United States) Rob Hodes (France) Gabriel Aubry (Guatemala) Ian Rodríguez	Oreca 07	G	83	
NC	LMP2 Pro-Am	51	(Poland) Team Virage	(United States) Rob Hodes (France) Gabriel Aubry (Guatemala) Ian Rodríguez	Gibson GK428 4.2 L V8	G	83	
DNF	LMGTE	33	(Germany) Rinaldi Racing	(Germany) Christian Hook (Netherlands) Jeroen Bleekemolen (Italy) Fabrizio Crestani	Ferrari 488 GTE Evo	G	78	
DNF	LMGTE	33	(Germany) Rinaldi Racing	(Germany) Christian Hook (Netherlands) Jeroen Bleekemolen (Italy) Fabrizio Crestani	Ferrari F154CB 3.9 L Turbo V8	G	78	
DNF	LMP2 Pro-Am	47	(Portugal) Algarve Pro Racing	(United States) John Falb (Australia) James Allen (Australia) Alex Peroni	Oreca 07	G	56	
DNF	LMP2 Pro-Am	47	(Portugal) Algarve Pro Racing	(United States) John Falb (Australia) James Allen (Australia) Alex Peroni	Gibson GK428 4.2 L V8	G	56	
DNF	LMP3	6	(United Kingdom) 360 Racing	(United Kingdom) Terrence Woodward (United Kingdom) Ross Kaiser (United Kingdom) Mark Richards	Ligier JS P320	MI	39	
DNF	LMP3	6	(United Kingdom) 360 Racing	(United Kingdom) Terrence Woodward (United Kingdom) Ross Kaiser (United Kingdom) Mark Richards	Nissan VK56DE 5.6 L V8	MI	39	
DNF	LMP2	21	(Belgium) Mühlner Motorsport	(Liechtenstein) Matthias Kaiser (France) Thomas Laurent (Belgium) Ugo de Wilde	Oreca 07	G	16	
DNF	LMP2	21	(Belgium) Mühlner Motorsport	(Liechtenstein) Matthias Kaiser (France) Thomas Laurent (Belgium) Ugo de Wilde	Gibson GK428 4.2 L V8	G	16	
DNF	LMP3	7	(United Kingdom) Nielsen Racing	(United Kingdom) Anthony Wells (United Kingdom) James Littlejohn	Ligier JS P320	MI	14	
DNF	LMP3	7	(United Kingdom) Nielsen Racing	(United Kingdom) Anthony Wells (United Kingdom) James Littlejohn	Nissan VK56DE 5.6 L V8	MI	14	
DNS	LMP3	11	(Italy) Eurointernational	(Netherlands) Max Koebolt (Switzerland) Jérôme de Sadeleer	Ligier JS P320	MI	0	
DNS	LMP3	11	(Italy) Eurointernational	(Netherlands) Max Koebolt (Switzerland) Jérôme de Sadeleer	Nissan VK56DE 5.6 L V8	MI	0	

European Le Mans Series
Previous race: 4 Hours of Spa-Francorchamps	2022 season	Next race: none
