= 2022 4 Hours of Le Castellet =

Endurance sportscar racing event

1A-V2 layout of Circuit Paul Ricard used for this race

The 2022 4 Hours of Le Castellet was an endurance sportscar racing event that was held on 17 April 2022, as the opening round of the 2022 European Le Mans Series.

In LMP2, the race was won by the #9 Prema run Oreca 07-Gibson, driven by Lorenzo Colombo, Louis Delétraz and Ferdinand Habsburg.

In LMP3, the race was won by the #17 COOL Racing run Ligier JS P320, driven by Mike Benham, Malthe Jakobsen and Maurice Smith.

In LMGTE, the race was won by the #32 Rinaldi Racing run Ferrari 488 GTE Evo, driven by Pierre Ehret, Nicolás Varrone and Memo Gidley.

== Qualifying ==
=== Qualifying Result ===
Pole position in each class are marked in bold.

Pos	Class	No.	Team	Lap Time	Grid
1	**LMP2 Pro-Am**	**31**	**(France) TDS Racing x Vaillante**	**1:43.038**	**1**
2	**LMP2**	**22**	**(United Kingdom) United Autosports**	**1:43.191**	**2**
3	LMP2	9	(Italy) Prema Racing	1:43.431	3
4	LMP2 Pro-Am	34	Racing Team Turkey	1:43.505	4
5	LMP2	65	(France) Panis Racing	1:43.612	5
6	LMP2 Pro-Am	24	(United Kingdom) Nielsen Racing	1:43.639	6
7	LMP2 Pro-Am	88	(Italy) AF Corse	1:43.750	7
8	LMP2	28	(France) IDEC Sport	1:43.851	8
9	LMP2	43	(Poland) Inter Europol Competition	1:44.016	9
10	LMP2	19	(Portugal) Algarve Pro Racing	1:44.030	10
11	LMP2 Pro-Am	51	(Poland) Team Virage	1:44.224	11
12	LMP2	30	(France) Duqueine Team	1:44.451	12
13	LMP2	21	(Belgium) Mühlner Motorsport	1:45.238	13
14	LMP2	35	(United Kingdom) BHK Motorsport	1:45.267	14
15	**LMP3**	**17**	**(Switzerland) COOL Racing**	**1:49.008**	**15**
16	LMP3	5	(United Kingdom) RLR Msport	1:49.347	16
17	LMP3	27	(Switzerland) COOL Racing	1:49.622	17
18	LMP3	4	(Luxembourg) DKR Engineering	1:49.700	18
19	LMP3	2	(United Kingdom) United Autosports	1:49.750	19
20	LMP3	15	(United Kingdom) RLR Msport	1:50.429	20
21	LMP3	3	(United Kingdom) United Autosports	1:50.456	21
22	LMP3	10	(Italy) EuroInternational	1:50.521	22
23	LMP3	7	(United Kingdom) Nielsen Racing	1:50.553	23
24	LMP3	14	(Poland) Inter Europol Competition	1:50.602	24
25	LMP3	13	(Poland) Inter Europol Competition	1:50.731	25
26	LMP3	6	(United Kingdom) 360 Racing	1:51.209	26
27	LMP3	11	(Italy) EuroInternational	1:52.433	27
28	**LMGTE**	**32**	**(Germany) Rinaldi Racing**	**1:54.755**	**28**
29	LMGTE	69	Oman Racing with TF Sport	1:54.909	29
30	LMGTE	83	(Italy) Iron Lynx	1:55.020	30
31	LMGTE	77	(Germany) Proton Competition	1:55.194	31
32	LMGTE	93	(Germany) Proton Competition	1:55.449	32
33	LMGTE	18	(Hong Kong) Absolute Racing	1:55.640	33
34	LMGTE	66	(United Kingdom) JMW Motorsport	1:55.811	34
35	LMGTE	33	(Germany) Rinaldi Racing	1:56.248	35
36	LMGTE	57	(Switzerland) Kessel Racing	1:56.305	36
37	LMGTE	55	(Switzerland) Spirit of Race	1:56.478	37
38	LMGTE	60	(Italy) Iron Lynx	1:57.161	38
39	LMGTE	95	Oman Racing with TF Sport	1:58.683	39
40	LMP2	37	(Switzerland) COOL Racing	No Time	40
41	LMP2 Pro-Am	47	(Portugal) Algarve Pro Racing	No Time	41
42	LMP2 Pro-Am	40	(France) Graff Racing	No Time	42

== Race ==
=== Race Result ===
Class winners are marked in bold. - Cars failing to complete 70% of the winner's distance are marked as Not Classified (NC).

Pos.	Class	No.	Team	Drivers	Chassis	Tyre	Laps	Time/Retired
Pos.	Class	No.	Team	Drivers	Engine	Tyre	Laps	Time/Retired
1	**LMP2**	**9**	**(Italy) Prema Racing**	**(Italy) Lorenzo Colombo** **(Switzerland) Louis Delétraz** **(Austria) Ferdinand Habsburg**	**Oreca 07**	**G**	**120**	**4:00:43.565‡**
1	**LMP2**	**9**	**(Italy) Prema Racing**	**(Italy) Lorenzo Colombo** **(Switzerland) Louis Delétraz** **(Austria) Ferdinand Habsburg**	**Gibson GK428 4.2 L V8**	**G**	**120**	**4:00:43.565‡**
2	LMP2	19	(Portugal) Algarve Pro Racing	(Germany) Sophia Flörsch (Netherlands) Bent Viscaal	Oreca 07	**G**	120	+10.936 s
2	LMP2	19	(Portugal) Algarve Pro Racing	(Germany) Sophia Flörsch (Netherlands) Bent Viscaal	Gibson GK428 4.2 L V8	**G**	120	+10.936 s
3	LMP2	65	(France) Panis Racing	(France) Julien Canal (France) Nico Jamin (Netherlands) Job van Uitert	Oreca 07	**G**	120	+13.484 s
3	LMP2	65	(France) Panis Racing	(France) Julien Canal (France) Nico Jamin (Netherlands) Job van Uitert	Gibson GK428 4.2 L V8	**G**	120	+13.484 s
4	LMP2	28	(France) IDEC Sport	(France) Paul Lafargue (France) Paul-Loup Chatin (France) Patrick Pilet	Oreca 07	**G**	120	+30.027 s
4	LMP2	28	(France) IDEC Sport	(France) Paul Lafargue (France) Paul-Loup Chatin (France) Patrick Pilet	Gibson GK428 4.2 L V8	**G**	120	+30.027 s
5	LMP2	37	(Switzerland) COOL Racing	(France) Nicolas Lapierre (Germany) Niklas Krütten (China) Ye Yifei	Oreca 07	**G**	120	+30.537 s
5	LMP2	37	(Switzerland) COOL Racing	(France) Nicolas Lapierre (Germany) Niklas Krütten (China) Ye Yifei	Gibson GK428 4.2 L V8	**G**	120	+30.537 s
6	**LMP2 Pro-Am**	**34**	**Racing Team Turkey**	**(Turkey) Salih Yoluç** **(Republic of Ireland) Charlie Eastwood** **(United Kingdom) Jack Aitken**	**Oreca 07**	G	**120**	**+33.737 s**
6	**LMP2 Pro-Am**	**34**	**Racing Team Turkey**	**(Turkey) Salih Yoluç** **(Republic of Ireland) Charlie Eastwood** **(United Kingdom) Jack Aitken**	**Gibson GK428 4.2 L V8**	G	**120**	**+33.737 s**
7	LMP2	22	(United Kingdom) United Autosports	(United Kingdom) Philip Hanson (United Kingdom) Tom Gamble (United Kingdom) Duncan Tappy	Oreca 07	**G**	120	+1:01.958
7	LMP2	22	(United Kingdom) United Autosports	(United Kingdom) Philip Hanson (United Kingdom) Tom Gamble (United Kingdom) Duncan Tappy	Gibson GK428 4.2 L V8	**G**	120	+1:01.958
8	LMP2 Pro-Am	88	(Italy) AF Corse	(France) François Perrodo (Denmark) Nicklas Nielsen (Italy) Alessio Rovera	Oreca 07	**G**	120	+1:12.820
8	LMP2 Pro-Am	88	(Italy) AF Corse	(France) François Perrodo (Denmark) Nicklas Nielsen (Italy) Alessio Rovera	Gibson GK428 4.2 L V8	**G**	120	+1:12.820
9	LMP2	21	(Belgium) Mühlner Motorsport	(Liechtenstein) Matthias Kaiser (France) Thomas Laurent (Belgium) Ugo de Wilde	Oreca 07	**G**	119	+1 Lap
9	LMP2	21	(Belgium) Mühlner Motorsport	(Liechtenstein) Matthias Kaiser (France) Thomas Laurent (Belgium) Ugo de Wilde	Gibson GK428 4.2 L V8	**G**	119	+1 Lap
10	LMP2 Pro-Am	31	(France) TDS Racing x Vaillante	(France) Philippe Cimadomo (Switzerland) Mathias Beche (Netherlands) Tijmen van der Helm	Oreca 07	**G**	119	+1 Lap
10	LMP2 Pro-Am	31	(France) TDS Racing x Vaillante	(France) Philippe Cimadomo (Switzerland) Mathias Beche (Netherlands) Tijmen van der Helm	Gibson GK428 4.2 L V8	**G**	119	+1 Lap
11	LMP2	43	(Poland) Inter Europol Competition	(Switzerland) Fabio Scherer (Brazil) Pietro Fittipaldi (Denmark) David Heinemeier Hansson	Oreca 07	**G**	119	+1 Lap
11	LMP2	43	(Poland) Inter Europol Competition	(Switzerland) Fabio Scherer (Brazil) Pietro Fittipaldi (Denmark) David Heinemeier Hansson	Gibson GK428 4.2 L V8	**G**	119	+1 Lap
12	LMP2	30	(France) Duqueine Team	(Mexico) Memo Rojas (France) Reshad de Gerus (United Kingdom) Richard Bradley	Oreca 07	**G**	119	+1 Lap
12	LMP2	30	(France) Duqueine Team	(Mexico) Memo Rojas (France) Reshad de Gerus (United Kingdom) Richard Bradley	Gibson GK428 4.2 L V8	**G**	119	+1 Lap
13	LMP2 Pro-Am	24	(United Kingdom) Nielsen Racing	(United States) Rodrigo Sales (United Kingdom) Matt Bell (United Kingdom) Ben Hanley	Oreca 07	**G**	119	+1 Lap
13	LMP2 Pro-Am	24	(United Kingdom) Nielsen Racing	(United States) Rodrigo Sales (United Kingdom) Matt Bell (United Kingdom) Ben Hanley	Gibson GK428 4.2 L V8	**G**	119	+1 Lap
14	LMP2	35	(United Kingdom) BHK Motorsport	(Italy) Sergio Campana (Germany) Markus Pommer	Oreca 07	**G**	118	+2 Laps
14	LMP2	35	(United Kingdom) BHK Motorsport	(Italy) Sergio Campana (Germany) Markus Pommer	Gibson GK428 4.2 L V8	**G**	118	+2 Laps
15	LMP2 Pro-Am	51	(Poland) Team Virage	(United States) Rob Hodes (France) Gabriel Aubry (Malaysia) Jazeman Jaafar	Oreca 07	**G**	118	+2 Laps
15	LMP2 Pro-Am	51	(Poland) Team Virage	(United States) Rob Hodes (France) Gabriel Aubry (Malaysia) Jazeman Jaafar	Gibson GK428 4.2 L V8	**G**	118	+2 Laps
16	LMP2 Pro-Am	40	(France) Graff Racing	(France) Eric Trouillet (Switzerland) Sébastien Page (Switzerland) David Droux	Oreca 07	**G**	118	+2 Laps
16	LMP2 Pro-Am	40	(France) Graff Racing	(France) Eric Trouillet (Switzerland) Sébastien Page (Switzerland) David Droux	Gibson GK428 4.2 L V8	**G**	118	+2 Laps
17	**LMP3**	**17**	**(Switzerland) COOL Racing**	**(United States) Maurice Smith** **(United Kingdom) Mike Benham** **(Denmark) Malthe Jakobsen**	**Ligier JS P320**	**MI**	**115**	**+5 Laps‡**
17	**LMP3**	**17**	**(Switzerland) COOL Racing**	**(United States) Maurice Smith** **(United Kingdom) Mike Benham** **(Denmark) Malthe Jakobsen**	**Nissan VK56DE 5.6 L V8**	**MI**	**115**	**+5 Laps‡**
18	LMP2 Pro-Am	47	(Portugal) Algarve Pro Racing	(United States) John Falb (Australia) James Allen (Australia) Alex Peroni	Oreca 07	**G**	114	+6 Laps
18	LMP2 Pro-Am	47	(Portugal) Algarve Pro Racing	(United States) John Falb (Australia) James Allen (Australia) Alex Peroni	Gibson GK428 4.2 L V8	**G**	114	+6 Laps
19	LMP3	2	(United Kingdom) United Autosports	(United Kingdom) Bailey Voisin (United Kingdom) Josh Caygill (Germany) Finn Gehrsitz	Ligier JS P320	**MI**	114	+6 Laps
19	LMP3	2	(United Kingdom) United Autosports	(United Kingdom) Bailey Voisin (United Kingdom) Josh Caygill (Germany) Finn Gehrsitz	Nissan VK56DE 5.6 L V8	**MI**	114	+6 Laps
20	LMP3	5	(United Kingdom) RLR MSport	(Denmark) Michael Jensen (United Kingdom) Nick Adcock (United Kingdom) Alex Kapadia	Ligier JS P320	**MI**	114	+6 Laps
20	LMP3	5	(United Kingdom) RLR MSport	(Denmark) Michael Jensen (United Kingdom) Nick Adcock (United Kingdom) Alex Kapadia	Nissan VK56DE 5.6 L V8	**MI**	114	+6 Laps
21	LMP3	10	(United States) Eurointernational	(Netherlands) Glenn van Berlo (Spain) Xavier Lloveras (Belgium) Tom Cloet	Ligier JS P320	**MI**	114	+6 Laps
21	LMP3	10	(United States) Eurointernational	(Netherlands) Glenn van Berlo (Spain) Xavier Lloveras (Belgium) Tom Cloet	Nissan VK56DE 5.6 L V8	**MI**	114	+6 Laps
22	LMP3	6	(United Kingdom) 360 Racing	(United Kingdom) Terrence Woodward (United Kingdom) Ross Kaiser (United Kingdom) Mark Richards	Ligier JS P320	**MI**	114	+6 Laps
22	LMP3	6	(United Kingdom) 360 Racing	(United Kingdom) Terrence Woodward (United Kingdom) Ross Kaiser (United Kingdom) Mark Richards	Nissan VK56DE 5.6 L V8	**MI**	114	+6 Laps
23	LMP3	7	(United Kingdom) Nielsen Racing	(United Kingdom) Anthony Wells (United Kingdom) James Littlejohn	Ligier JS P320	**MI**	113	+7 Laps
23	LMP3	7	(United Kingdom) Nielsen Racing	(United Kingdom) Anthony Wells (United Kingdom) James Littlejohn	Nissan VK56DE 5.6 L V8	**MI**	113	+7 Laps
24	**LMGTE**	**32**	**(Germany) Rinaldi Racing**	**(Germany) Pierre Ehret** **(Argentina) Nicolás Varrone** **(United States) Memo Gidley**	**Ferrari 488 GTE Evo**	**G**	**113**	**+7 Laps‡**
24	**LMGTE**	**32**	**(Germany) Rinaldi Racing**	**(Germany) Pierre Ehret** **(Argentina) Nicolás Varrone** **(United States) Memo Gidley**	**Ferrari F154CB 3.9 L Turbo V8**	**G**	**113**	**+7 Laps‡**
25	LMGTE	77	(Germany) Proton Competition	(Germany) Christian Ried (Italy) Lorenzo Ferrari (Italy) Gianmaria Bruni	Porsche 911 RSR-19	**G**	113	+7 Laps
25	LMGTE	77	(Germany) Proton Competition	(Germany) Christian Ried (Italy) Lorenzo Ferrari (Italy) Gianmaria Bruni	Porsche 4.2 L Flat-6	**G**	113	+7 Laps
26	LMGTE	93	(Germany) Proton Competition	(Republic of Ireland) Michael Fassbender (Canada) Zacharie Robichon (Austria) Richard Lietz	Porsche 911 RSR-19	**G**	113	+7 Laps
26	LMGTE	93	(Germany) Proton Competition	(Republic of Ireland) Michael Fassbender (Canada) Zacharie Robichon (Austria) Richard Lietz	Porsche 4.2 L Flat-6	**G**	113	+7 Laps
27	LMGTE	83	(Italy) Iron Lynx	(Switzerland) Rahel Frey (Denmark) Michelle Gatting (Belgium) Sarah Bovy	Ferrari 488 GTE Evo	**G**	113	+7 Laps
27	LMGTE	83	(Italy) Iron Lynx	(Switzerland) Rahel Frey (Denmark) Michelle Gatting (Belgium) Sarah Bovy	Ferrari F154CB 3.9 L Turbo V8	**G**	113	+7 Laps
28	LMGTE	57	(Switzerland) Kessel Racing	(Japan) Takeshi Kimura (Denmark) Frederik Schandorff (Denmark) Mikkel Jensen	Ferrari 488 GTE Evo	**G**	113	+7 Laps
28	LMGTE	57	(Switzerland) Kessel Racing	(Japan) Takeshi Kimura (Denmark) Frederik Schandorff (Denmark) Mikkel Jensen	Ferrari F154CB 3.9 L Turbo V8	**G**	113	+7 Laps
29	LMGTE	95	Oman Racing with TF Sport	(United Kingdom) John Hartshorne (Portugal) Henrique Chaves (United Kingdom) Jonathan Adam	Aston Martin Vantage AMR	**G**	113	+7 Laps
29	LMGTE	95	Oman Racing with TF Sport	(United Kingdom) John Hartshorne (Portugal) Henrique Chaves (United Kingdom) Jonathan Adam	Aston Martin 4.0 L Turbo V8	**G**	113	+7 Laps
30	LMGTE	60	(Italy) Iron Lynx	(Italy) Claudio Schiavoni (Italy) Matteo Cressoni (Italy) Davide Rigon	Ferrari 488 GTE Evo	**G**	113	+7 Laps
30	LMGTE	60	(Italy) Iron Lynx	(Italy) Claudio Schiavoni (Italy) Matteo Cressoni (Italy) Davide Rigon	Ferrari F154CB 3.9 L Turbo V8	**G**	113	+7 Laps
31	LMGTE	18	(Hong Kong) Absolute Racing	(Indonesia) Andrew Haryanto (Estonia) Martin Rump (Belgium) Alessio Picariello	Porsche 911 RSR-19	**G**	113	+7 Laps
31	LMGTE	18	(Hong Kong) Absolute Racing	(Indonesia) Andrew Haryanto (Estonia) Martin Rump (Belgium) Alessio Picariello	Porsche 4.2 L Flat-6	**G**	113	+7 Laps
32	LMP3	3	(United Kingdom) United Autosports	(United States) James McGuire (Netherlands) Kay van Berlo (United Kingdom) Andrew Bentley	Ligier JS P320	**MI**	112	+8 Laps
32	LMP3	3	(United Kingdom) United Autosports	(United States) James McGuire (Netherlands) Kay van Berlo (United Kingdom) Andrew Bentley	Nissan VK56DE 5.6 L V8	**MI**	112	+8 Laps
33	LMGTE	55	(Switzerland) Spirit of Race	(United Kingdom) Duncan Cameron (Republic of Ireland) Matt Griffin (South Africa) David Perel	Ferrari 488 GTE Evo	**G**	112	+8 Laps
33	LMGTE	55	(Switzerland) Spirit of Race	(United Kingdom) Duncan Cameron (Republic of Ireland) Matt Griffin (South Africa) David Perel	Ferrari F154CB 3.9 L Turbo V8	**G**	112	+8 Laps
34	LMP3	14	(Poland) Inter Europol Competition	(France) Noam Abramczyk (Poland) Mateusz Kaprzyk (Canada) James Dayson	Ligier JS P320	**MI**	112	+8 Laps
34	LMP3	14	(Poland) Inter Europol Competition	(France) Noam Abramczyk (Poland) Mateusz Kaprzyk (Canada) James Dayson	Nissan VK56DE 5.6 L V8	**MI**	112	+8 Laps
35	LMGTE	66	(United Kingdom) JMW Motorsport	(Italy) Giacorno Petrobelli (Singapore) Sean Hudspeth (New Zealand) Matthew Payne	Ferrari 488 GTE Evo	**G**	112	+8 Laps
35	LMGTE	66	(United Kingdom) JMW Motorsport	(Italy) Giacorno Petrobelli (Singapore) Sean Hudspeth (New Zealand) Matthew Payne	Ferrari F154CB 3.9 L Turbo V8	**G**	112	+8 Laps
36	LMGTE	33	(Germany) Rinaldi Racing	(Germany) Christian Hook (Colombia) Óscar Tunjo (Italy) Fabrizio Crestani	Ferrari 488 GTE Evo	**G**	112	+8 Laps
36	LMGTE	33	(Germany) Rinaldi Racing	(Germany) Christian Hook (Colombia) Óscar Tunjo (Italy) Fabrizio Crestani	Ferrari F154CB 3.9 L Turbo V8	**G**	112	+8 Laps
37	LMP3	4	(Luxembourg) DKR Engineering	(Mexico) Sebastián Álvarez (United Arab Emirates) Alexander Bukhantsov (Belgium) Tom Van Rompuy	Duqueine M30 – D08	**MI**	112	+8 Laps
37	LMP3	4	(Luxembourg) DKR Engineering	(Mexico) Sebastián Álvarez (United Arab Emirates) Alexander Bukhantsov (Belgium) Tom Van Rompuy	Nissan VK56DE 5.6 L V8	**MI**	112	+8 Laps
DNF	LMP3	11	(United States) Eurointernational	(Argentina) Marcos Siebert (Netherlands) Max Koebolt (France) Adrien Chila	Ligier JS P320	**MI**	70	Engine
DNF	LMP3	11	(United States) Eurointernational	(Argentina) Marcos Siebert (Netherlands) Max Koebolt (France) Adrien Chila	Nissan VK56DE 5.6 L V8	**MI**	70	Engine
DNF	LMP3	27	(Switzerland) COOL Racing	(Switzerland) Nicolas Maulini (France) Jean-Ludovic Foubert (France) Antoine Doquin	Ligier JS P320	**MI**	22	Accident Damage
DNF	LMP3	27	(Switzerland) COOL Racing	(Switzerland) Nicolas Maulini (France) Jean-Ludovic Foubert (France) Antoine Doquin	Nissan VK56DE 5.6 L V8	**MI**	22	Accident Damage
DNF	LMP3	15	(United Kingdom) RLR MSport	(Austria) Horst Felbemayr Jr. (Germany) Valentino Catalano (United States) Austin McCusker	Ligier JS P320	**MI**	9	Crash
DNF	LMP3	15	(United Kingdom) RLR MSport	(Austria) Horst Felbemayr Jr. (Germany) Valentino Catalano (United States) Austin McCusker	Nissan VK56DE 5.6 L V8	**MI**	9	Crash
DNF	LMGTE	69	Oman Racing with TF Sport	(Oman) Ahmad Al Harthy (Denmark) Marco Sørensen (United Kingdom) Sam De Haan	Aston Martin Vantage AMR	**G**	2	Accident Damage
DNF	LMGTE	69	Oman Racing with TF Sport	(Oman) Ahmad Al Harthy (Denmark) Marco Sørensen (United Kingdom) Sam De Haan	Aston Martin 4.0 L Turbo V8	**G**	2	Accident Damage
DSQ	LMP3	13	(Poland) Inter Europol Competition	(United States) Charles Crews (Chile) Nico Pino (Portugal) Guilherme Oliveira	Ligier JS P320	**MI**	115	Disqualified^{1}
DSQ	LMP3	13	(Poland) Inter Europol Competition	(United States) Charles Crews (Chile) Nico Pino (Portugal) Guilherme Oliveira	Nissan VK56DE 5.6 L V8	**MI**	115	Disqualified^{1}

Notes

- **^1**;- The #13 Inter Europol Competition Ligier JS P320 was disqualified from the race due to a stewards decision.

European Le Mans Series
Previous race: none	2022 season	Next race: 4 Hours of Imola
