= 2022 4 Hours of Monza =

Layout of the Autodromo Nazionale Monza

The 2022 4 Hours of Monza was an endurance sportscar racing event that was held on 3 July 2022, as the third round of the 2022 European Le Mans Series.

In LMP2, the race was won by the #28 IDEC Sport run Oreca 07-Gibson, driven by Paul Lafargue, Paul-Loup Chatin and Patrick Pilet.

In LMP3, the race was won by the #13 Inter Europol Competition run Ligier JS P320, driven by Nico Pino, Charles Crews and Guilherme Oliveira.

In LMGTE, the race was won by the #60 Iron Lynx run Ferrari 488 GTE Evo, driven by Claudio Schiavoni, Matteo Cressoni and Davide Rigon.

== Qualifying ==
=== Qualifying Result ===
Pole position in each class are marked in bold.

Pos	Class	No.	Team	Lap Time	Grid
1	**LMP2 Pro-Am**	**31**	**(France) TDS Racing x Vaillante**	**1:38.032**	1
2	**LMP2**	**65**	**(France) Panis Racing**	**1:38.313**	2
3	LMP2	43	(Poland) Inter Europol Competition	1:38.568	3
4	LMP2 Pro-Am	47	(Portugal) Algarve Pro Racing	1:38.625	4
5	LMP2	37	(Switzerland) Cool Racing	1:38.701	5
6	LMP2	9	(Italy) Prema Racing	1:38.746	6
7	LMP2	22	(United Kingdom) United Autosports	1:38.776	7
8	LMP2	30	(France) Duqueine Team	1:38.777	8
9	LMP2	28	(France) IDEC Sport	1:38.826	9
10	LMP2 Pro-Am	34	Racing Team Turkey	1:38.844	10
11	LMP2 Pro-Am	24	(United Kingdom) Nielsen Racing	1:38.886	11
12	LMP2	21	(Belgium) Mühlner Motorsport	1:38.956	12
13	LMP2 Pro-Am	88	(Italy) AF Corse	1:38.984	13
14	LMP2	19	(Portugal) Algarve Pro Racing	1:39.089	14
15	LMP2 Pro-Am	51	(Poland) Team Virage	1:39.237	15
16	LMP2	35	(United Kingdom) BHK Motorsport	1:39.324	16
17	LMP2 Pro-Am	40	(France) Graff Racing	1:39.976	17
18	**LMP3**	**17**	**(Switzerland) Cool Racing**	**1:43.627**	18
19	LMP3	13	(Poland) Inter Europol Competition	1:44.421	19
20	LMP3	3	(United Kingdom) United Autosports	1:44.422	20
21	LMP3	2	(United Kingdom) United Autosports	1:44.721	21
22	LMP3	5	(United Kingdom) RLR Msport	1:44.738	22
23	LMP3	15	(United Kingdom) RLR Msport	1:44.777	23
24	LMP3	14	(Poland) Inter Europol Competition	1:44.792	24
25	LMP3	7	(United Kingdom) Nielsen Racing	1:44.796	25
26	LMP3	10	(Italy) EuroInternational	1:44.844	26
27	LMP3	27	(Switzerland) COOL Racing	1:45.191	42
28	LMP3	11	(Italy) EuroInternational	1:45.200	27
29	LMP3	6	(United Kingdom) 360 Racing	1:45.267	28
30	LMP3	4	(Luxembourg) DKR Engineering	1:45.902	29
31	**LMGTE**	**77**	**(Germany) Proton Competition**	1:48.859	30
32	LMGTE	83	(Italy) Iron Lynx	1:49.105	31
33	LMGTE	18	(Hong Kong) Absolute Racing	1:49.521	32
34	LMGTE	66	(United Kingdom) JMW Motorsport	1:49.735	33
35	LMGTE	32	(Germany) Rinaldi Racing	1:49.888	34
36	LMGTE	69	Oman Racing with TF Sport	1:50.118	35
37	LMGTE	93	(Germany) Proton Competition	1:50.272	36
38	LMGTE	57	(Switzerland) Kessel Racing	1:50.353	37
39	LMGTE	55	(Switzerland) Spirit of Race	1:50.704	38
40	LMGTE	33	(Germany) Rinaldi Racing	1:50.707	39
41	LMGTE	60	(Italy) Iron Lynx	1:51.170	40
42	LMGTE	95	Oman Racing with TF Sport	1:52.553	41

== Race ==
=== Race Result ===
Class winners are marked in bold. - Cars failing to complete 70% of the winner's distance are marked as Not Classified (NC).

Pos.	Class	No.	Team	Drivers	Chassis	Tyre	Laps	Time/Retired
Pos.	Class	No.	Team	Drivers	Engine	Tyre	Laps	Time/Retired
1	LMP2	28	(France) IDEC Sport	(France) Paul Lafargue (France) Paul-Loup Chatin (France) Patrick Pilet	Oreca 07	G	121	**4:00:54.476‡**
1	LMP2	28	(France) IDEC Sport	(France) Paul Lafargue (France) Paul-Loup Chatin (France) Patrick Pilet	Gibson GK428 4.2 L V8	G	121	**4:00:54.476‡**
2	LMP2	65	(France) Panis Racing	(France) Julien Canal (France) Nico Jamin (Netherlands) Job van Uitert	Oreca 07	G	121	+13.209 s
2	LMP2	65	(France) Panis Racing	(France) Julien Canal (France) Nico Jamin (Netherlands) Job van Uitert	Gibson GK428 4.2 L V8	G	121	+13.209 s
3	LMP2	21	(Belgium) Mühlner Motorsport	(Liechtenstein) Matthias Kaiser (France) Thomas Laurent (Belgium) Ugo de Wilde	Oreca 07	G	121	+28.177 s
3	LMP2	21	(Belgium) Mühlner Motorsport	(Liechtenstein) Matthias Kaiser (France) Thomas Laurent (Belgium) Ugo de Wilde	Gibson GK428 4.2 L V8	G	121	+28.177 s
4	LMP2	22	(United Kingdom) United Autosports	(United Kingdom) Philip Hanson (United Kingdom) Tom Gamble (United Kingdom) Duncan Tappy	Oreca 07	G	121	+29.066 s
4	LMP2	22	(United Kingdom) United Autosports	(United Kingdom) Philip Hanson (United Kingdom) Tom Gamble (United Kingdom) Duncan Tappy	Gibson GK428 4.2 L V8	G	121	+29.066 s
5	LMP2	9	(Italy) Prema Racing	(Italy) Lorenzo Colombo (Switzerland) Louis Delétraz (Austria) Ferdinand Habsburg	Oreca 07	G	121	+29.496 s
5	LMP2	9	(Italy) Prema Racing	(Italy) Lorenzo Colombo (Switzerland) Louis Delétraz (Austria) Ferdinand Habsburg	Gibson GK428 4.2 L V8	G	121	+29.496 s
6	**LMP2 Pro-Am**	**24**	**(United Kingdom) Nielsen Racing**	**(United States) Rodrigo Sales** **(United Kingdom) Matt Bell** **(United Kingdom) Ben Hanley**	**Oreca 07**	G	**121**	**+29.702 s‡**
6	**LMP2 Pro-Am**	**24**	**(United Kingdom) Nielsen Racing**	**(United States) Rodrigo Sales** **(United Kingdom) Matt Bell** **(United Kingdom) Ben Hanley**	**Gibson GK428 4.2 L V8**	G	**121**	**+29.702 s‡**
7	LMP2 Pro-Am	34	Racing Team Turkey	(Turkey) Salih Yoluç (Republic of Ireland) Charlie Eastwood (United Kingdom) Jack Aitken	Oreca 07	G	121	+29.768 s
7	LMP2 Pro-Am	34	Racing Team Turkey	(Turkey) Salih Yoluç (Republic of Ireland) Charlie Eastwood (United Kingdom) Jack Aitken	Gibson GK428 4.2 L V8	G	121	+29.768 s
8	LMP2	37	(Switzerland) Cool Racing	(France) Nicolas Lapierre (Germany) Niklas Krütten (China) Ye Yifei	Oreca 07	G	121	+31.790 s
8	LMP2	37	(Switzerland) Cool Racing	(France) Nicolas Lapierre (Germany) Niklas Krütten (China) Ye Yifei	Gibson GK428 4.2 L V8	G	121	+31.790 s
9	LMP2 Pro-Am	47	(Portugal) Algarve Pro Racing	(United States) John Falb (Australia) James Allen (Australia) Alex Peroni	Oreca 07	G	121	+33.875 s
9	LMP2 Pro-Am	47	(Portugal) Algarve Pro Racing	(United States) John Falb (Australia) James Allen (Australia) Alex Peroni	Gibson GK428 4.2 L V8	G	121	+33.875 s
10	LMP2	19	(Portugal) Algarve Pro Racing	(Germany) Sophia Flörsch (Netherlands) Bent Viscaal	Oreca 07	G	121	+44.459 s
10	LMP2	19	(Portugal) Algarve Pro Racing	(Germany) Sophia Flörsch (Netherlands) Bent Viscaal	Gibson GK428 4.2 L V8	G	121	+44.459 s
11	LMP2	43	(Poland) Inter Europol Competition	(Switzerland) Fabio Scherer (Brazil) Pietro Fittipaldi (Denmark) David Heinemeier Hansson	Oreca 07	G	121	+46.571 s
11	LMP2	43	(Poland) Inter Europol Competition	(Switzerland) Fabio Scherer (Brazil) Pietro Fittipaldi (Denmark) David Heinemeier Hansson	Gibson GK428 4.2 L V8	G	121	+46.571 s
12	LMP2 Pro-Am	88	(Italy) AF Corse	(France) François Perrodo (Denmark) Nicklas Nielsen (Italy) Alessio Rovera	Oreca 07	G	120	+1 Lap
12	LMP2 Pro-Am	88	(Italy) AF Corse	(France) François Perrodo (Denmark) Nicklas Nielsen (Italy) Alessio Rovera	Gibson GK428 4.2 L V8	G	120	+1 Lap
13	LMP2 Pro-Am	31	(France) TDS Racing x Vaillante	(France) Philippe Cimadomo (Switzerland) Mathias Beche (Netherlands) Tijmen van der Helm	Oreca 07	G	120	+1 Lap
13	LMP2 Pro-Am	31	(France) TDS Racing x Vaillante	(France) Philippe Cimadomo (Switzerland) Mathias Beche (Netherlands) Tijmen van der Helm	Gibson GK428 4.2 L V8	G	120	+1 Lap
14	LMP2	35	(United Kingdom) BHK Motorsport	(Italy) Francesco Dracone (Italy) Sergio Campana (Germany) Markus Pommer	Oreca 07	G	120	+1 Lap
14	LMP2	35	(United Kingdom) BHK Motorsport	(Italy) Francesco Dracone (Italy) Sergio Campana (Germany) Markus Pommer	Gibson GK428 4.2 L V8	G	120	+1 Lap
15	LMP2 Pro-Am	51	(Poland) Team Virage	(United States) Rob Hodes (France) Gabriel Aubry (Malaysia) Jazeman Jaafar	Oreca 07	G	120	+1 Lap
15	LMP2 Pro-Am	51	(Poland) Team Virage	(United States) Rob Hodes (France) Gabriel Aubry (Malaysia) Jazeman Jaafar	Gibson GK428 4.2 L V8	G	120	+1 Lap
16	LMP2 Pro-Am	40	(France) Graff Racing	(France) Eric Trouillet (Switzerland) Sébastien Page (Switzerland) David Droux	Oreca 07	G	119	+2 Laps
16	LMP2 Pro-Am	40	(France) Graff Racing	(France) Eric Trouillet (Switzerland) Sébastien Page (Switzerland) David Droux	Gibson GK428 4.2 L V8	G	119	+2 Laps
17	**LMP3**	**13**	**(Poland) Inter Europol Competition**	**(United States) Charles Crews** **(Chile) Nico Pino** **(Portugal) Guilherme Oliveira**	**Ligier JS P320**	MI	**117**	**+4 Laps‡**
17	**LMP3**	**13**	**(Poland) Inter Europol Competition**	**(United States) Charles Crews** **(Chile) Nico Pino** **(Portugal) Guilherme Oliveira**	**Nissan VK56DE 5.6 L V8**	MI	**117**	**+4 Laps‡**
18	LMP3	6	(United Kingdom) 360 Racing	(United Kingdom) Terrence Woodward (United Kingdom) Ross Kaiser (United Kingdom) Mark Richards	Ligier JS P320	MI	117	+4 Laps
18	LMP3	6	(United Kingdom) 360 Racing	(United Kingdom) Terrence Woodward (United Kingdom) Ross Kaiser (United Kingdom) Mark Richards	Nissan VK56DE 5.6 L V8	MI	117	+4 Laps
19	LMP3	11	(United States) Eurointernational	(Netherlands) Max Koebolt (Switzerland) Jérôme de Sadeleer	Ligier JS P320	MI	117	+4 Laps
19	LMP3	11	(United States) Eurointernational	(Netherlands) Max Koebolt (Switzerland) Jérôme de Sadeleer	Nissan VK56DE 5.6 L V8	MI	117	+4 Laps
20	LMP3	5	(United Kingdom) RLR MSport	(Denmark) Michael Jensen (United Kingdom) Nick Adcock (United Kingdom) Alex Kapadia	Ligier JS P320	MI	116	+5 Laps
20	LMP3	5	(United Kingdom) RLR MSport	(Denmark) Michael Jensen (United Kingdom) Nick Adcock (United Kingdom) Alex Kapadia	Nissan VK56DE 5.6 L V8	MI	116	+5 Laps
21	LMP3	2	(United Kingdom) United Autosports	(United Kingdom) Bailey Voisin (United Kingdom) Josh Caygill (Germany) Finn Gehrsitz	Ligier JS P320	MI	116	+5 Laps
21	LMP3	2	(United Kingdom) United Autosports	(United Kingdom) Bailey Voisin (United Kingdom) Josh Caygill (Germany) Finn Gehrsitz	Nissan VK56DE 5.6 L V8	MI	116	+5 Laps
22	LMP3	27	(Switzerland) Cool Racing	(Switzerland) Nicolas Maulini (France) Jean-Ludovic Foubert (France) Antoine Doquin	Ligier JS P320	MI	116	+5 Laps
22	LMP3	27	(Switzerland) Cool Racing	(Switzerland) Nicolas Maulini (France) Jean-Ludovic Foubert (France) Antoine Doquin	Nissan VK56DE 5.6 L V8	MI	116	+5 Laps
23	**LMGTE**	**60**	**(Italy) Iron Lynx**	**(Italy) Claudio Schiavoni** **(Italy) Matteo Cressoni** **(Italy) Davide Rigon**	**Ferrari 488 GTE Evo**	G	**115**	**+6 Laps‡**
23	**LMGTE**	**60**	**(Italy) Iron Lynx**	**(Italy) Claudio Schiavoni** **(Italy) Matteo Cressoni** **(Italy) Davide Rigon**	**Ferrari F154CB 3.9 L Turbo V8**	G	**115**	**+6 Laps‡**
24	LMGTE	77	(Germany) Proton Competition	(Germany) Christian Ried (Italy) Lorenzo Ferrari (Italy) Gianmaria Bruni	Porsche 911 RSR-19	G	115	+6 Laps
24	LMGTE	77	(Germany) Proton Competition	(Germany) Christian Ried (Italy) Lorenzo Ferrari (Italy) Gianmaria Bruni	Porsche 4.2 L Flat-6	G	115	+6 Laps
25	LMGTE	57	(Switzerland) Kessel Racing	(Japan) Takeshi Kimura (Denmark) Frederik Schandorff (Denmark) Mikkel Jensen	Ferrari 488 GTE Evo	G	115	+6 Laps
25	LMGTE	57	(Switzerland) Kessel Racing	(Japan) Takeshi Kimura (Denmark) Frederik Schandorff (Denmark) Mikkel Jensen	Ferrari F154CB 3.9 L Turbo V8	G	115	+6 Laps
26	LMGTE	18	(Hong Kong) Absolute Racing	(Indonesia) Andrew Haryanto (Estonia) Martin Rump (Belgium) Alessio Picariello	Porsche 911 RSR-19	G	115	+6 Laps
26	LMGTE	18	(Hong Kong) Absolute Racing	(Indonesia) Andrew Haryanto (Estonia) Martin Rump (Belgium) Alessio Picariello	Porsche 4.2 L Flat-6	G	115	+6 Laps
27	LMGTE	83	(Italy) Iron Lynx	(Switzerland) Rahel Frey (Denmark) Michelle Gatting (Belgium) Sarah Bovy	Ferrari 488 GTE Evo	G	115	+6 Laps
27	LMGTE	83	(Italy) Iron Lynx	(Switzerland) Rahel Frey (Denmark) Michelle Gatting (Belgium) Sarah Bovy	Ferrari F154CB 3.9 L Turbo V8	G	115	+6 Laps
28	LMP3	7	(United Kingdom) Nielsen Racing	(United Kingdom) Anthony Wells (United Kingdom) James Littlejohn	Ligier JS P320	MI	115	+6 Laps
28	LMP3	7	(United Kingdom) Nielsen Racing	(United Kingdom) Anthony Wells (United Kingdom) James Littlejohn	Nissan VK56DE 5.6 L V8	MI	115	+6 Laps
29	LMGTE	32	(Germany) Rinaldi Racing	(Germany) Pierre Ehret (Argentina) Nicolás Varrone (Italy) Gabriele Lancieri	Ferrari 488 GTE Evo	G	115	+6 Laps
29	LMGTE	32	(Germany) Rinaldi Racing	(Germany) Pierre Ehret (Argentina) Nicolás Varrone (Italy) Gabriele Lancieri	Ferrari F154CB 3.9 L Turbo V8	G	115	+6 Laps
30	LMGTE	66	(United Kingdom) JMW Motorsport	(Italy) Giacorno Petrobelli (Singapore) Sean Hudspeth (New Zealand) Matthew Payne	Ferrari 488 GTE Evo	G	115	+6 Laps
30	LMGTE	66	(United Kingdom) JMW Motorsport	(Italy) Giacorno Petrobelli (Singapore) Sean Hudspeth (New Zealand) Matthew Payne	Ferrari F154CB 3.9 L Turbo V8	G	115	+6 Laps
31	LMGTE	55	(Switzerland) Spirit of Race	(United Kingdom) Duncan Cameron (Republic of Ireland) Matt Griffin (South Africa) David Perel	Ferrari 488 GTE Evo	G	115	+6 Laps
31	LMGTE	55	(Switzerland) Spirit of Race	(United Kingdom) Duncan Cameron (Republic of Ireland) Matt Griffin (South Africa) David Perel	Ferrari F154CB 3.9 L Turbo V8	G	115	+6 Laps
32	LMP3	4	(Luxembourg) DKR Engineering	(Mexico) Sebastián Álvarez (United Arab Emirates) Alexander Bukhantsov (United Kingdom) James Winslow	Duqueine M30 – D08	MI	114	+7 Laps
32	LMP3	4	(Luxembourg) DKR Engineering	(Mexico) Sebastián Álvarez (United Arab Emirates) Alexander Bukhantsov (United Kingdom) James Winslow	Nissan VK56DE 5.6 L V8	MI	114	+7 Laps
33	LMGTE	33	(Germany) Rinaldi Racing	(Germany) Christian Hook (Netherlands) Jeroen Bleekemolen (Italy) Fabrizio Crestani	Ferrari 488 GTE Evo	G	114	+7 Laps
33	LMGTE	33	(Germany) Rinaldi Racing	(Germany) Christian Hook (Netherlands) Jeroen Bleekemolen (Italy) Fabrizio Crestani	Ferrari F154CB 3.9 L Turbo V8	G	114	+7 Laps
34	LMGTE	69	Oman Racing with TF Sport	(Oman) Ahmad Al Harthy (Denmark) Marco Sørensen (United Kingdom) Sam De Haan	Aston Martin Vantage AMR	G	113	+8 Laps
34	LMGTE	69	Oman Racing with TF Sport	(Oman) Ahmad Al Harthy (Denmark) Marco Sørensen (United Kingdom) Sam De Haan	Aston Martin 4.0 L Turbo V8	G	113	+8 Laps
35	LMGTE	95	Oman Racing with TF Sport	(United Kingdom) John Hartshorne (Portugal) Henrique Chaves (United Kingdom) Jonathan Adam	Aston Martin Vantage AMR	G	112	+9 Laps
35	LMGTE	95	Oman Racing with TF Sport	(United Kingdom) John Hartshorne (Portugal) Henrique Chaves (United Kingdom) Jonathan Adam	Aston Martin 4.0 L Turbo V8	G	112	+9 Laps
NC	LMP3	10	(United States) Eurointernational	(Netherlands) Glenn van Berlo (Spain) Xavier Lloveras (France) Adrien Chila	Ligier JS P320	MI	116	Incomplete final lap (Drive-through penalty)
NC	LMP3	10	(United States) Eurointernational	(Netherlands) Glenn van Berlo (Spain) Xavier Lloveras (France) Adrien Chila	Nissan VK56DE 5.6 L V8	MI	116	Incomplete final lap (Drive-through penalty)
DNF	LMP3	17	(Switzerland) Cool Racing	(United States) Maurice Smith (United Kingdom) Mike Benham (Denmark) Malthe Jakobsen	Ligier JS P320	MI	44	Accident Damage
DNF	LMP3	17	(Switzerland) Cool Racing	(United States) Maurice Smith (United Kingdom) Mike Benham (Denmark) Malthe Jakobsen	Nissan VK56DE 5.6 L V8	MI	44	Accident Damage
DNF	LMP3	3	(United Kingdom) United Autosports	(Netherlands) Kay van Berlo (United States) James McGuire (United Kingdom) Andrew Bentley	Ligier JS P320	MI	26	Crash
DNF	LMP3	3	(United Kingdom) United Autosports	(Netherlands) Kay van Berlo (United States) James McGuire (United Kingdom) Andrew Bentley	Nissan VK56DE 5.6 L V8	MI	26	Crash
DNF	LMP3	14	(Poland) Inter Europol Competition	(France) Noam Abramczyk (Poland) Mateusz Kaprzyk (Canada) James Dayson	Ligier JS P320	MI	15	Crash
DNF	LMP3	14	(Poland) Inter Europol Competition	(France) Noam Abramczyk (Poland) Mateusz Kaprzyk (Canada) James Dayson	Nissan VK56DE 5.6 L V8	MI	15	Crash
DNF	LMP2	30	(France) Duqueine Team	(Mexico) Memo Rojas (France) Reshad de Gerus (United Kingdom) Richard Bradley	Oreca 07	G	10	Accident Damage
DNF	LMP2	30	(France) Duqueine Team	(Mexico) Memo Rojas (France) Reshad de Gerus (United Kingdom) Richard Bradley	Gibson GK428 4.2 L V8	G	10	Accident Damage
DNF	LMGTE	93	(Germany) Proton Competition	(Republic of Ireland) Michael Fassbender (Canada) Zacharie Robichon (Austria) Richard Lietz	Porsche 911 RSR-19	G	8	Accident
DNF	LMGTE	93	(Germany) Proton Competition	(Republic of Ireland) Michael Fassbender (Canada) Zacharie Robichon (Austria) Richard Lietz	Porsche 4.2 L Flat-6	G	8	Accident
DNF	LMP3	15	(United Kingdom) RLR MSport	(Austria) Horst Felbemayr Jr. (Germany) Valentino Catalano (United States) Austin McCusker	Ligier JS P320	MI	2	Retired - Overheating
DNF	LMP3	15	(United Kingdom) RLR MSport	(Austria) Horst Felbemayr Jr. (Germany) Valentino Catalano (United States) Austin McCusker	Nissan VK56DE 5.6 L V8	MI	2	Retired - Overheating

European Le Mans Series
Previous race: 4 Hours of Imola	2022 season	Next race: 4 Hours of Barcelona
