= Aston Martin Vantage GTE =

Aston Martin Vantage GTE may refer to two racing cars:

- Aston Martin Vantage GTE (2012), an upgraded version of the Vantage GT2
- Aston Martin Vantage GTE (2018), based on the 2018 Vantage
