= 2022 European Le Mans Series =

2022 ELMS season

Prema Racing No. 9 Oreca 07, winner of the 2022 European Le Mans Series in the LMP2 class

The 2022 European Le Mans Series was the nineteenth season of the Automobile Club de l'Ouest's (ACO) European Le Mans Series. The six-event season began at Circuit Paul Ricard on 17 April and finished at Algarve International Circuit on 16 October.

The series was open to Le Mans Prototypes, divided into the LMP2 and LMP3 classes, and grand tourer-style racing cars in the LMGTE class.

== Calendar ==
The provisional calendar for the 2022 season was announced on 17 September 2021. The Imola Circuit will return to the series after a 6-year absence, while the Red Bull Ring will not feature on the calendar. On 28 February 2022, it was announced that a round at the Hungaroring would be replaced by the Monza Circuit.

Rnd	Race	Circuit	Location	Date
1	4 Hours of Le Castellet	(France) Circuit Paul Ricard	Le Castellet, France	17 April
2	4 Hours of Imola	(Italy) Imola Circuit	Imola, Italy	15 May
3	4 Hours of Monza	(Italy) Monza Circuit	Monza, Italy	3 July
4	4 Hours of Barcelona	(Spain) Circuit de Barcelona-Catalunya	Montmeló, Spain	28 August
5	4 Hours of Spa-Francorchamps	(Belgium) Circuit de Spa-Francorchamps	Stavelot, Belgium	25 September
6	4 Hours of Portimão	(Portugal) Algarve International Circuit	Portimão, Portugal	16 October

== Entries ==
=== LMP2 ===
All cars in the LMP2 class used the Gibson GK428 V8 engine and Goodyear tyres. Entries in the LMP2 Pro-Am Cup, set aside for teams with a Bronze-rated driver in their line-up, are denoted with Icons.

Entrant/Team	Chassis	No.	MISC	Drivers	Rounds
(Italy) Prema Racing	Oreca 07	9	P2	(Switzerland) Louis Delétraz	All
(Italy) Prema Racing	Oreca 07	9	P2	(Austria) Ferdinand Habsburg	All
(Italy) Prema Racing	Oreca 07	9	P2	(Italy) Lorenzo Colombo	1–4
(Italy) Prema Racing	Oreca 07	9	P2	(United States) Juan Manuel Correa	5–6
(Portugal) Algarve Pro Racing (Note: G-Drive Racing was scheduled to field two LMP2 entries, including one in the LMP2 Pro-Am Cup, but the team and driver Roman Rusinov refused to accept the FIA's code of conduct regarding the participation of Russian competitors after the 2022 Russian invasion of Ukraine, and withdrew on 6 March. Algarve Pro Racing, who operated the G-Drive LMP2 program, took over both entries independently.)	Oreca 07	19	P2	(Netherlands) Bent Viscaal	All
(Portugal) Algarve Pro Racing	Oreca 07	19	P2	(Germany) Sophia Flörsch	1–4
(Portugal) Algarve Pro Racing	Oreca 07	19	P2	(Romania) Filip Ugran	5–6
(Portugal) Algarve Pro Racing	Oreca 07	47	PA	(Australia) James Allen	All
(Portugal) Algarve Pro Racing	Oreca 07	47	PA	(United States) John Falb	All
(Portugal) Algarve Pro Racing	Oreca 07	47	PA	(Australia) Alex Peroni	All
(Belgium) Mühlner Motorsport	Oreca 07	21	P2	(Liechtenstein) Matthias Kaiser	All
(Belgium) Mühlner Motorsport	Oreca 07	21	P2	(France) Thomas Laurent	All
(Belgium) Mühlner Motorsport	Oreca 07	21	P2	(Belgium) Ugo de Wilde	All
(United Kingdom) United Autosports	Oreca 07	22	P2	(United Kingdom) Tom Gamble	All
(United Kingdom) United Autosports	Oreca 07	22	P2	(United Kingdom) Phil Hanson	All
(United Kingdom) United Autosports	Oreca 07	22	P2	(United Kingdom) Duncan Tappy	All
(United Kingdom) Nielsen Racing	Oreca 07	24	PA	(United Kingdom) Matt Bell	All
(United Kingdom) Nielsen Racing	Oreca 07	24	PA	(United Kingdom) Ben Hanley	All
(United Kingdom) Nielsen Racing	Oreca 07	24	PA	(United States) Rodrigo Sales	All
(France) IDEC Sport	Oreca 07	28	P2	(France) Paul-Loup Chatin	All
(France) IDEC Sport	Oreca 07	28	P2	(France) Paul Lafargue	All
(France) IDEC Sport	Oreca 07	28	P2	(France) Patrick Pilet	All
(France) Duqueine Team	Oreca 07	30	P2	(United Kingdom) Richard Bradley	All
(France) Duqueine Team	Oreca 07	30	P2	(Mexico) Memo Rojas	All
(France) Duqueine Team	Oreca 07	30	P2	(France) Reshad de Gerus	1–3
(France) Duqueine Team	Oreca 07	30	P2	(Denmark) Anders Fjordbach	4
(France) Duqueine Team	Oreca 07	30	P2	(France) Mathieu de Barbuat	5
(France) Duqueine Team	Oreca 07	30	P2	(Portugal) Rui Andrade	6
(France) TDS Racing x Vaillante	Oreca 07	31	PA	(Switzerland) Mathias Beche	All
(France) TDS Racing x Vaillante	Oreca 07	31	PA	(France) Philippe Cimadomo	All
(France) TDS Racing x Vaillante	Oreca 07	31	PA	(Netherlands) Tijmen van der Helm	All
Racing Team Turkey	Oreca 07	34	PA	(Republic of Ireland) Charlie Eastwood	All
Racing Team Turkey	Oreca 07	34	PA	(Turkey) Salih Yoluç	All
Racing Team Turkey	Oreca 07	34	PA	(United Kingdom) Jack Aitken	1–4, 6
Racing Team Turkey	Oreca 07	34	PA	(United Kingdom) Will Stevens	5
(United Kingdom) BHK Motorsport	Oreca 07	35	P2	(Italy) Sergio Campana	All
(United Kingdom) BHK Motorsport	Oreca 07	35	P2	(Italy) Francesco Dracone	All
(United Kingdom) BHK Motorsport	Oreca 07	35	P2	(Germany) Markus Pommer	All
(Switzerland) Cool Racing	Oreca 07	37	P2	(Germany) Niklas Krütten	All
(Switzerland) Cool Racing	Oreca 07	37	P2	(France) Nicolas Lapierre	All
(Switzerland) Cool Racing	Oreca 07	37	P2	(China) Yifei Ye	All
(France) Graff Racing	Oreca 07	40	PA	(Switzerland) David Droux	1–3
(France) Graff Racing	Oreca 07	40	PA	(Switzerland) Sébastien Page	1–3
(France) Graff Racing	Oreca 07	40	PA	(France) Eric Trouillet	1–3
(Poland) Inter Europol Competition	Oreca 07	43	P2	(Brazil) Pietro Fittipaldi	All
(Poland) Inter Europol Competition	Oreca 07	43	P2	(Denmark) David Heinemeier Hansson	All
(Poland) Inter Europol Competition	Oreca 07	43	P2	(Switzerland) Fabio Scherer	All
(Poland) Team Virage	Oreca 07	51	PA	(France) Gabriel Aubry	All
(Poland) Team Virage	Oreca 07	51	PA	(United States) Rob Hodes	All
(Poland) Team Virage	Oreca 07	51	PA	(Malaysia) Jazeman Jaafar	1–3
(Poland) Team Virage	Oreca 07	51	PA	(Guatemala) Ian Rodríguez	4–6
(France) Panis Racing	Oreca 07	65	P2	(France) Julien Canal	All
(France) Panis Racing	Oreca 07	65	P2	(France) Nico Jamin	All
(France) Panis Racing	Oreca 07	65	P2	(Netherlands) Job van Uitert	All
(Italy) AF Corse	Oreca 07	88	PA	(Denmark) Nicklas Nielsen	All
(Italy) AF Corse	Oreca 07	88	PA	(France) François Perrodo	All
(Italy) AF Corse	Oreca 07	88	PA	(Italy) Alessio Rovera	All

Icon	MISC
P2	LMP2
PA	LMP2 Pro-Am Cup

- Augusto Farfus was scheduled to compete for BHK Motorsport, but did not appear at any rounds.

=== LMP3 ===
All cars in the LMP3 class used the Nissan VK56DE 5.6L V8 engine and Michelin tyres.

Entrant/Team	Chassis	No.	Drivers	Rounds
(United Kingdom) United Autosports	Ligier JS P320	2	(United Kingdom) Josh Caygill	All
(United Kingdom) United Autosports	Ligier JS P320	2	(Germany) Finn Gehrsitz	All
(United Kingdom) United Autosports	Ligier JS P320	2	(United Kingdom) Bailey Voisin	All
(United Kingdom) United Autosports	Ligier JS P320	3	(United Kingdom) Andrew Bentley	All
(United Kingdom) United Autosports	Ligier JS P320	3	(Netherlands) Kay van Berlo	All
(United Kingdom) United Autosports	Ligier JS P320	3	(United States) James McGuire	1, 3–6
(Luxembourg) DKR Engineering	Duqueine M30 - D08	4	(Mexico) Sebastián Álvarez	All
(Luxembourg) DKR Engineering	Duqueine M30 - D08	4	(United Arab Emirates) Alexander Bukhantsov	All
(Luxembourg) DKR Engineering	Duqueine M30 - D08	4	(Belgium) Tom Van Rompuy	1–2, 4–6
(Luxembourg) DKR Engineering	Duqueine M30 - D08	4	(United Kingdom) James Winslow	3
(United Kingdom) RLR MSport	Ligier JS P320	5	(United Kingdom) Nick Adcock	All
(United Kingdom) RLR MSport	Ligier JS P320	5	(Denmark) Michael Jensen	All
(United Kingdom) RLR MSport	Ligier JS P320	5	(United Kingdom) Alex Kapadia	All
(United Kingdom) RLR MSport	Ligier JS P320	15	(Germany) Valentino Catalano	All
(United Kingdom) RLR MSport	Ligier JS P320	15	(Austria) Horst Felbermayr Jr.	All
(United Kingdom) RLR MSport	Ligier JS P320	15	(United States) Austin McCusker	All
(United Kingdom) 360 Racing	Ligier JS P320	6	(United Kingdom) Ross Kaiser	All
(United Kingdom) 360 Racing	Ligier JS P320	6	(United Kingdom) Terrence Woodward	All
(United Kingdom) 360 Racing	Ligier JS P320	6	(United Kingdom) Mark Richards	1–5
(United Kingdom) 360 Racing	Ligier JS P320	6	(Spain) Santiago Concepción Serrano	6
(United Kingdom) Nielsen Racing	Ligier JS P320	7	(United Kingdom) James Littlejohn	1–3, 5–6
(United Kingdom) Nielsen Racing	Ligier JS P320	7	(United Kingdom) Anthony Wells	1–3, 5–6
(Italy) Eurointernational (Note: G-Drive Racing was scheduled to field an LMP3 entry, but the team and driver Evgeny Kireev refused to accept the FIA's code of conduct regarding the participation of Russian competitors after the 2022 Russian invasion of Ukraine, and withdrew on 6 March. Eurointernational, who operated the G-Drive LMP3 program, took over the entry independently, therefore expanding to a two-car effort alongside its existing #11 car.)	Ligier JS P320	10	(Spain) Xavier Lloveras	All
(Italy) Eurointernational	Ligier JS P320	10	(Netherlands) Glenn van Berlo	1–4
(Italy) Eurointernational	Ligier JS P320	10	(Belgium) Tom Cloet	1
(Italy) Eurointernational	Ligier JS P320	10	(France) Adrien Chila	2–3
(Italy) Eurointernational	Ligier JS P320	10	(United Kingdom) Freddie Hunt	4
(Italy) Eurointernational	Ligier JS P320	10	(Portugal) Miguel Cristóvão	5–6
(Italy) Eurointernational	Ligier JS P320	11	(Netherlands) Max Koebolt	All
(Italy) Eurointernational	Ligier JS P320	11	(Argentina) Marcos Siebert	1–2
(Italy) Eurointernational	Ligier JS P320	11	(France) Adrien Chila	1
(Italy) Eurointernational	Ligier JS P320	11	(Switzerland) Jérôme de Sadeleer	2–6
(Italy) Eurointernational	Ligier JS P320	11	(France) Louis Rousset	4
(Italy) Eurointernational	Ligier JS P320	11	(Spain) Santiago Concepción Serrano	5
(Poland) Inter Europol Competition	Ligier JS P320	13	(United States) Charles Crews	All
(Poland) Inter Europol Competition	Ligier JS P320	13	(Portugal) Guilherme Oliveira	All
(Poland) Inter Europol Competition	Ligier JS P320	13	(Chile) Nico Pino	All
(Poland) Inter Europol Competition	Ligier JS P320	14	(France) Noam Abramczyk	All
(Poland) Inter Europol Competition	Ligier JS P320	14	(Canada) James Dayson	All
(Poland) Inter Europol Competition	Ligier JS P320	14	(Poland) Mateusz Kaprzyk	All
(Switzerland) Cool Racing	Ligier JS P320	17	(United Kingdom) Mike Benham	All
(Switzerland) Cool Racing	Ligier JS P320	17	(Denmark) Malthe Jakobsen	All
(Switzerland) Cool Racing	Ligier JS P320	17	(United States) Maurice Smith	All
(Switzerland) Cool Racing	Ligier JS P320	27	(France) Antoine Doquin	All
(Switzerland) Cool Racing	Ligier JS P320	27	(France) Jean-Ludovic Foubert	All
(Switzerland) Cool Racing	Ligier JS P320	27	(Switzerland) Nicolas Maulini	All

=== LMGTE ===
All cars in the LMGTE class used Goodyear tyres.

Entrant/Team	Chassis	Engine	No.	Drivers	Rounds
(Hong Kong) Absolute Racing	Porsche 911 RSR-19	Porsche M97/80 4.2 L Flat-6	18	(Indonesia) Andrew Haryanto	All
(Hong Kong) Absolute Racing	Porsche 911 RSR-19	Porsche M97/80 4.2 L Flat-6	18	(Belgium) Alessio Picariello	All
(Hong Kong) Absolute Racing	Porsche 911 RSR-19	Porsche M97/80 4.2 L Flat-6	18	(Estonia) Martin Rump	All
(Germany) Rinaldi Racing	Ferrari 488 GTE Evo	Ferrari F154CB 4.0 L Turbo V8	32	(Argentina) Nicolás Varrone	All
(Germany) Rinaldi Racing	Ferrari 488 GTE Evo	Ferrari F154CB 4.0 L Turbo V8	32	(Germany) Pierre Ehret	1–5
(Germany) Rinaldi Racing	Ferrari 488 GTE Evo	Ferrari F154CB 4.0 L Turbo V8	32	(United States) Memo Gidley	1
(Germany) Rinaldi Racing	Ferrari 488 GTE Evo	Ferrari F154CB 4.0 L Turbo V8	32	(Italy) Gabriele Lancieri	2–3
(Germany) Rinaldi Racing	Ferrari 488 GTE Evo	Ferrari F154CB 4.0 L Turbo V8	32	(Italy) Diego Alessi	4–6
(Germany) Rinaldi Racing	Ferrari 488 GTE Evo	Ferrari F154CB 4.0 L Turbo V8	33	(Italy) Fabrizio Crestani	1–3, 5–6
(Germany) Rinaldi Racing	Ferrari 488 GTE Evo	Ferrari F154CB 4.0 L Turbo V8	33	(Germany) Christian Hook	1–3, 5–6
(Germany) Rinaldi Racing	Ferrari 488 GTE Evo	Ferrari F154CB 4.0 L Turbo V8	33	(Colombia) Óscar Tunjo	1–2
(Germany) Rinaldi Racing	Ferrari 488 GTE Evo	Ferrari F154CB 4.0 L Turbo V8	33	(Netherlands) Jeroen Bleekemolen	3, 5–6
(Switzerland) Spirit of Race	Ferrari 488 GTE Evo	Ferrari F154CB 4.0 L Turbo V8	55	(United Kingdom) Duncan Cameron	All
(Switzerland) Spirit of Race	Ferrari 488 GTE Evo	Ferrari F154CB 4.0 L Turbo V8	55	(Republic of Ireland) Matt Griffin	All
(Switzerland) Spirit of Race	Ferrari 488 GTE Evo	Ferrari F154CB 4.0 L Turbo V8	55	(South Africa) David Perel	All
(Switzerland) Kessel Racing	Ferrari 488 GTE Evo	Ferrari F154CB 4.0 L Turbo V8	57	(Denmark) Mikkel Jensen	All
(Switzerland) Kessel Racing	Ferrari 488 GTE Evo	Ferrari F154CB 4.0 L Turbo V8	57	(Denmark) Frederik Schandorff	All
(Switzerland) Kessel Racing	Ferrari 488 GTE Evo	Ferrari F154CB 4.0 L Turbo V8	57	(Japan) Takeshi Kimura	1–4, 6
(Switzerland) Kessel Racing	Ferrari 488 GTE Evo	Ferrari F154CB 4.0 L Turbo V8	57	(United States) Conrad Grunewald	5
(Italy) Iron Lynx	Ferrari 488 GTE Evo	Ferrari F154CB 4.0 L Turbo V8	60	(Italy) Matteo Cressoni	All
(Italy) Iron Lynx	Ferrari 488 GTE Evo	Ferrari F154CB 4.0 L Turbo V8	60	(Italy) Davide Rigon	All
(Italy) Iron Lynx	Ferrari 488 GTE Evo	Ferrari F154CB 4.0 L Turbo V8	60	(Italy) Claudio Schiavoni	All
(Italy) Iron Lynx	Ferrari 488 GTE Evo	Ferrari F154CB 4.0 L Turbo V8	83	(Belgium) Sarah Bovy	All
(Italy) Iron Lynx	Ferrari 488 GTE Evo	Ferrari F154CB 4.0 L Turbo V8	83	(Denmark) Michelle Gatting	All
(Italy) Iron Lynx	Ferrari 488 GTE Evo	Ferrari F154CB 4.0 L Turbo V8	83	(Switzerland) Rahel Frey	1–3
(Italy) Iron Lynx	Ferrari 488 GTE Evo	Ferrari F154CB 4.0 L Turbo V8	83	(France) Doriane Pin	4–6
(United Kingdom) JMW Motorsport	Ferrari 488 GTE Evo	Ferrari F154CB 4.0 L Turbo V8	66	(Singapore) Sean Hudspeth	All
(United Kingdom) JMW Motorsport	Ferrari 488 GTE Evo	Ferrari F154CB 4.0 L Turbo V8	66	(Italy) Giacomo Petrobelli	All
(United Kingdom) JMW Motorsport	Ferrari 488 GTE Evo	Ferrari F154CB 4.0 L Turbo V8	66	(New Zealand) Matthew Payne	1–3, 5–6
(United Kingdom) JMW Motorsport	Ferrari 488 GTE Evo	Ferrari F154CB 4.0 L Turbo V8	66	(Spain) Miguel Molina	4
Oman Racing with TF Sport	Aston Martin Vantage AMR	Aston Martin M177 4.0 L Turbo V8	69	(Oman) Ahmad Al Harthy	All
Oman Racing with TF Sport	Aston Martin Vantage AMR	Aston Martin M177 4.0 L Turbo V8	69	(United Kingdom) Sam De Haan	All
Oman Racing with TF Sport	Aston Martin Vantage AMR	Aston Martin M177 4.0 L Turbo V8	69	(Denmark) Marco Sørensen	All
Oman Racing with TF Sport	Aston Martin Vantage AMR	Aston Martin M177 4.0 L Turbo V8	95	(United Kingdom) Jonathan Adam	All
Oman Racing with TF Sport	Aston Martin Vantage AMR	Aston Martin M177 4.0 L Turbo V8	95	(Portugal) Henrique Chaves	All
Oman Racing with TF Sport	Aston Martin Vantage AMR	Aston Martin M177 4.0 L Turbo V8	95	(United Kingdom) John Hartshorne	All
(Germany) Proton Competition	Porsche 911 RSR-19	Porsche M97/80 4.2 L Flat-6	77	(Italy) Gianmaria Bruni	All
(Germany) Proton Competition	Porsche 911 RSR-19	Porsche M97/80 4.2 L Flat-6	77	(Italy) Lorenzo Ferrari	All
(Germany) Proton Competition	Porsche 911 RSR-19	Porsche M97/80 4.2 L Flat-6	77	(Germany) Christian Ried	All
(Germany) Proton Competition	Porsche 911 RSR-19	Porsche M97/80 4.2 L Flat-6	93	(Republic of Ireland) Michael Fassbender	All
(Germany) Proton Competition	Porsche 911 RSR-19	Porsche M97/80 4.2 L Flat-6	93	(Austria) Richard Lietz	All
(Germany) Proton Competition	Porsche 911 RSR-19	Porsche M97/80 4.2 L Flat-6	93	(Canada) Zacharie Robichon	All

- Kessel Racing was scheduled to enter a second Ferrari 488 GTE Evo for Michał Broniszewski and two unconfirmed drivers, but withdrew in late March. They were replaced by the #6 LMP3 Ligier of 360 Racing, originally a reserve entry.

== Results and standings ==
=== Race results ===
Bold indicates overall winner.

Rnd.	Circuit	Pole	LMP2 Winning Team	LMP2 Pro-Am Winning Team	LMP3 Winning Team	LMGTE Winning Team	Results
Rnd.	Circuit	Pole	LMP2 Winning Drivers	LMP2 Pro-Am Winning Drivers	LMP3 Winning Drivers	LMGTE Winning Drivers	Results
1	(France) Le Castellet	(France) No. 31 TDS Racing x Vaillante	**(Italy) No. 9 Prema Racing**	No. 34 Racing Team Turkey	(Switzerland) No. 17 Cool Racing	(Germany) No. 32 Rinaldi Racing	Race Report; Race Results
1	(France) Le Castellet	**(Switzerland) Mathias Beche** (France) Philippe Cimadomo (Netherlands) Tijmen van der Helm	**(Italy) Lorenzo Colombo** **(Switzerland) Louis Delétraz** **(Austria) Ferdinand Habsburg**	(United Kingdom) Jack Aitken (Republic of Ireland) Charlie Eastwood (Turkey) Salih Yoluç	(United Kingdom) Mike Benham (Denmark) Malthe Jakobsen (United States) Maurice Smith	(Germany) Pierre Ehret (United States) Memo Gidley (Argentina) Nicolás Varrone	Race Report; Race Results
2	(Italy) Imola	(Italy) No. 88 AF Corse	**(Italy) No. 9 Prema Racing**	No. 34 Racing Team Turkey	(United Kingdom) No. 3 United Autosports	No. 69 Oman Racing with TF Sport	Race Report; Race Results
2	(Italy) Imola	(Denmark) Nicklas Nielsen (France) François Perrodo **(Italy) Alessio Rovera**	**(Italy) Lorenzo Colombo** **(Switzerland) Louis Delétraz** **(Austria) Ferdinand Habsburg**	(United Kingdom) Jack Aitken (Republic of Ireland) Charlie Eastwood (Turkey) Salih Yoluç	(United Kingdom) Andrew Bentley (Netherlands) Kay van Berlo	(Oman) Ahmad Al Harthy (United Kingdom) Sam De Haan (Denmark) Marco Sørensen	Race Report; Race Results
3	(Italy) Monza	(France) No. 31 TDS Racing x Vaillante	**(France) No. 28 IDEC Sport**	(United Kingdom) No. 24 Nielsen Racing	(Poland) No. 13 Inter Europol Competition	(Italy) No. 60 Iron Lynx	Race Report; Race Results
3	(Italy) Monza	**(Switzerland) Mathias Beche** (France) Philippe Cimadomo (Netherlands) Tijmen van der Helm	**(France) Paul-Loup Chatin** **(France) Paul Lafargue** **(France) Patrick Pilet**	(United Kingdom) Matt Bell (United Kingdom) Ben Hanley (United States) Rodrigo Sales	(United States) Charles Crews (Portugal) Guilherme Oliveira (Chile) Nico Pino	(Italy) Davide Rigon (Italy) Matteo Cressoni (Italy) Claudio Schiavoni	Race Report; Race Results
4	(Spain) Catalunya	(France) No. 65 Panis Racing	**(Italy) No. 9 Prema Racing**	(Italy) No. 88 AF Corse	(Poland) No. 13 Inter Europol Competition	(Germany) No. 77 Proton Competition	Race Report; Race Results
4	(Spain) Catalunya	(France) Julien Canal **(France) Nico Jamin** (Netherlands) Job van Uitert	**(Italy) Lorenzo Colombo** **(Switzerland) Louis Delétraz** **(Austria) Ferdinand Habsburg**	(Denmark) Nicklas Nielsen (France) François Perrodo (Italy) Alessio Rovera	(United States) Charles Crews (Portugal) Guilherme Oliveira (Chile) Nico Pino	(Italy) Gianmaria Bruni (Italy) Lorenzo Ferrari (Germany) Christian Ried	Race Report; Race Results
5	(Belgium) Spa-Francorchamps	(Switzerland) No. 37 Cool Racing	**(United Kingdom) No. 22 United Autosports**	No. 34 Racing Team Turkey	(Poland) No. 13 Inter Europol Competition	(Switzerland) No. 57 Kessel Racing	Race Report; Race Results
5	(Belgium) Spa-Francorchamps	(Germany) Niklas Krütten (France) Nicolas Lapierre **(China) Yifei Ye**	**(United Kingdom) Tom Gamble** **(United Kingdom) Phil Hanson** **(United Kingdom) Duncan Tappy**	(United Kingdom) Will Stevens (Republic of Ireland) Charlie Eastwood (Turkey) Salih Yoluç	(United States) Charles Crews (Portugal) Guilherme Oliveira (Chile) Nico Pino	(United States) Conrad Grunewald (Denmark) Mikkel Jensen (Denmark) Frederik Schandorff	Race Report; Race Results
6	(Portugal) Algarve	No. 34 Racing Team Turkey	**(Italy) No. 9 Prema Racing**	No. 34 Racing Team Turkey	(Switzerland) No. 17 Cool Racing	(Italy) No. 83 Iron Lynx	Race Report; Race Results
6	(Portugal) Algarve	**(United Kingdom) Jack Aitken** (Republic of Ireland) Charlie Eastwood (Turkey) Salih Yoluç	**(United States) Juan Manuel Correa** **(Switzerland) Louis Delétraz** **(Austria) Ferdinand Habsburg**	(United Kingdom) Jack Aitken (Republic of Ireland) Charlie Eastwood (Turkey) Salih Yoluç	(United Kingdom) Mike Benham (Denmark) Malthe Jakobsen (United States) Maurice Smith	(Belgium) Sarah Bovy (Denmark) Michelle Gatting (France) Doriane Pin	Race Report; Race Results

== Season report ==
=== Le Castellet ===
The season started at Le Castellet, where the No. 31 TDS Racing x Vaillante LMP2 Pro-Am entry of Mathias Beche scored pole. The race was won dominantly by the No. 9 Prema Racing crew of Louis Delétraz, Ferdinand Habsburg, and Lorenzo Colombo, who deputised for the injured Juan Manuel Correa. The two-car No. 19 Algarve Pro Racing entry of Bent Viscaal and Sophia Flörsch scored a surprising second place, having gone off strategy before Viscaal held off third-placed Job van Uitert in the No. 65 Panis Racing in the closing laps. The Pro-Am subclass was won by the No. 34 of Racing Team Turkey, with the No. 88 AF Corse and No. 31 TDS cars completing the podium.

Having encountered engine issues late in the race, the No. 13 Inter Europol Competition Ligier of Nico Pino was caught by the No. 17 Cool Racing of Malthe Jakobsen, who went on the LMP3 class; Pino held on to second ahead of the No. 2 United Autosports. After the race, the No. 13 was disqualified for a technical infringement, promoting the No. 2 to second and the No. 5 of RLR MSport to third. The LMGTE battle was decided on the final lap, as Nicolás Varrone (No. 32 Rinaldi Racing) — who had required medical intervention due to dehydration earlier in the weekend — narrowly beat the No. 77 Proton Competition Porsche of Gianmaria Bruni to the flag. The sister Proton No. 93 completed the podium.

=== Imola ===
Another LMP2 Pro-Am car took pole at Imola, with AF Corse's Alessio Rovera beating Beche to the fastest laptime. Prema's Colombo took the lead at the start, but received a drive-through penalty for being out of position at the start. Despite getting another drive-through for crossing the pit exit line, the Prema crew remained in the fight for the lead, while the No. 65 Panis car of Job van Uitert recovered from an earlier spin by Julien Canal to take the lead over Cool Racing's Yifei Ye. Ye passed van Uitert before the final round of pit stops, but lost first place as the No. 9 Prema and No. 22 United were able to jump ahead by pitting under a full-course yellow. Delétraz then held Tom Gamble behind to secure Prema's second successive victory, as Cool Racing placed third. The Pro-Am subclass, also for the second time in a row, was won by Racing Team Turkey's No. 34.

LMP3 was dominated by the No. 3 United Autosports entry of Kay van Berlo and Andrew Bentley, who finished a lap ahead of the No. 27 and No. 17 Cool Racing crews. Having led early on during the bronze stints with Ahmad Al Harthy, the No. 69 Oman Racing Aston Martin won LMGTE ahead of the sister No. 95 entry, while a disqualification for the No. 57 Kessel Racing Ferrari promoted the No. 55 Spirit of Race Ferrari to the final podium spot.

=== Monza ===
A dominant lap by Mathias Beche earned the No. 31 TDS pole position at Monza, their second of the season. In a chaotic race, the No. 28 IDEC Sport came out victorious — closing driver Paul-Loup Chatin passed the Prema of Delétraz and overcame a 20-second penalty in the penultimate stint by gapping the field. The No. 65 Panis car finished second, while Prema Racing recovered from a 10-second penalty to finish third after a late overtake from Delétraz on the No. 21 Mühlner car; Prema were penalised again after the race which promoted the No. 21 to third. Nielsen Racing's No. 24 won the Pro-Am class.

LMP3 was won by the No. 13 of Inter Europol, Guilherme Oliveira having passed the No. 6 360 Racing car of Ross Kaiser in the final stint. Eurointernational's No. 11 finished third, benefiting from multiple retirements in class, including that of the polesitting No. 17 Cool Racing crew. The No. 60 Iron Lynx won in LMGTE thanks to a strong final hour from Davide Rigon, who narrowly beat the No. 77 Proton Porsche of Lorenzo Ferrari and No. 57 Kessel Ferrari of Frederik Schandorff.

=== Barcelona ===
Nico Jamin took pole for Panis Racing at Barcelona. The Panis car was passed in the opening hour by Ferdinand Habsburg, as Prema went on to win by over 20 seconds over the No. 65. The No. 37 Cool Racing crew finished third, with fourth going to Pro-Am winners AF Corse after a strong stint from Alessio Rovera.

Despite a track limits penalty earned by Pino, the No. 13 Inter Europol won the LMP3 class again after a commanding drive, placing ahead of the No. 4 DKR Engineering Duqueine. A strong stint by Malthe Jakobsen earned the No. 17 Cool Racing team third place. In LMGTE, a final-hour pass from Bruni on David Perel gave the No. 77 the win ahead of the No. 55, with the No. 66 JMW Motorsport Ferrari finishing third after receiving a drive-through for contact between Giacomo Petrobelli and the No. 93.

=== Spa-Francorchamps ===
At Spa-Francorchamps, Ye set the pole time for Cool Racing's No. 37. The team fought for a podium place until Nicolas Lapierre ran off after a battle with the No. 43 Inter Europol of Fabio Scherer; he then suffered a puncture which dropped the car down the order. Instead, the No. 22 United of Gamble, Phil Hanson, and Duncan Tappy won the race, as the No. 43 held on to second despite late pressure from the No. 9 Prema — which now held a 24-point gap over the No. 65 Panis going into the final round. In the Pro-Am subclass, AF Corse led until the final lap, when Alessio Rovera was passed just before the finish line by Racing Team Turkey's substitute driver, Will Stevens.

A commanding drive saw Inter Europol's No. 13 take LMP3 honours for the third time running, with points leaders Cool Racing retiring after early contact incurred by Mo Smith. The No. 4 DKR finished second and Nielsen's No. 7 took third, having overcome contact from Alex Kapadia's No. 5 in the final hour. Despite a spin for bronze-ranked debutant and polesitter Conrad Grunewald — narrowly avoided by Iron Dames's Sarah Bovy —, the No. 57 Kessel Ferrari clinched victory after Mikkel Jensen passed Michelle Gatting during the closing stint. The Dames car finished second, with Absolute Racing completing the podium.

=== Portimão ===
Jack Aitken (No. 34 Racing Team Turkey) clinched pole at Portimão, denying Prema's Delétraz the pole position point required to win the championship in advance by less than a tenth of a second. Meanwhile, Malthe Jakobsen claimed his sixth pole in six races in the LMP3 class, putting Cool Racing 18 points behind the No. 13 Inter Europol entry.

Nevertheless, Prema emerged from a chaotic race to win, clinching the teams' title as well as the drivers' title for full-timers Delétraz and Habsburg. Panis's No. 65 finished second in the standings, securing an automatic invitation for the 2023 24 Hours of Le Mans in part thanks to a spin into the gravel and subsequent clutch failure for Phil Hanson's No. 22 United. Van Uitert held off the chasing No. 37 Cool Racing of Ye in the closing laps to finish second. Racing Team Turkey overcame an early spin by bronze driver Salih Yoluç in wet conditions to win the Pro-Am subclass and, in turn, the drivers' title with Yoluç and Charlie Eastwood.

Drama occurred in the final laps of the LMP3 fight, as the No. 13 dropped back to third, a position that would have been enough to clinch the title. However, after making contact with the No. 31 TDS of Beche, the car lost place dramatically in the final hour, before Oliveira collided with the No. 95 Aston, having been unable to turn in at Turn 1 following a pit stop to change a wheel. Jakobsen led the No. 17 Cool Racing crew to the race win and, in turn, the LMP3 title, while the No. 2 United and No. 27 Cool Racing entries completed the podium. The LMGTE title was taken by the No. 77 Proton Porsche of Bruni, Ferrari, and team owner Christian Ried, while the race was dominated by the No. 83 Iron Dames crew of Bovy, Gatting, and Doriane Pin — who scored a historic first win for an all-female lineup. Oman Racing placed second, with Kessel Racing third.

== Drivers' Championships ==
Points are awarded according to the following structure:

Position	**1st**	**2nd**	**3rd**	**4th**	**5th**	**6th**	**7th**	**8th**	**9th**	**10th**	**Pole**
Points	25	18	15	12	10	8	6	4	2	1	1

=== LMP2 Drivers Championship ===
Pos.	Driver	Team	LEC (France)	IMO (Italy)	MNZ (Italy)	CAT (Spain)	SPA (Belgium)	POR (Portugal)	Points
1	(Switzerland) Louis Delétraz	(Italy) Prema Racing	1	1	5	1	3	1	125
1	(Austria) Ferdinand Habsburg	(Italy) Prema Racing	1	1	5	1	3	1	125
2	(France) Julien Canal	(France) Panis Racing	3	4	2	**2**	4	2	94
2	(France) Nico Jamin	(France) Panis Racing	3	4	2	**2**	4	2	94
2	(Netherlands) Job van Uitert	(France) Panis Racing	3	4	2	**2**	4	2	94
3	(Italy) Lorenzo Colombo	(Italy) Prema Racing	1	1	5	1			85
4	(United Kingdom) Tom Gamble	(United Kingdom) United Autosports	7	2	4	4	1	Ret	73
4	(United Kingdom) Phil Hanson	(United Kingdom) United Autosports	7	2	4	4	1	Ret	73
4	(United Kingdom) Duncan Tappy	(United Kingdom) United Autosports	7	2	4	4	1	Ret	73
5	(Germany) Niklas Krütten	(Switzerland) Cool Racing	5	3	8	3	**5**	3	70
5	(France) Nicolas Lapierre	(Switzerland) Cool Racing	5	3	8	3	**5**	3	70
5	(China) Yifei Ye	(Switzerland) Cool Racing	5	3	8	3	**5**	3	70
6	(France) Paul-Loup Chatin	(France) IDEC Sport	4	5	1	13	Ret	7	53
6	(France) Paul Lafargue	(France) IDEC Sport	4	5	1	13	Ret	7	53
6	(France) Patrick Pilet	(France) IDEC Sport	4	5	1	13	Ret	7	53
7	(United States) Juan Manuel Correa	(Italy) Prema Racing					3	1	40
8	(Republic of Ireland) Charlie Eastwood	Racing Team Turkey	6	7	7	10	6	**6**	38
8	(Turkey) Salih Yoluç	Racing Team Turkey	6	7	7	10	6	**6**	38
9	(Netherlands) Bent Viscaal	(Portugal) Algarve Pro Racing	2	8	10	12	8	5	37
10	(Brazil) Pietro Fittipaldi	(Poland) Inter Europol Competition	11	9	11	16	2	4	32
10	(Denmark) David Heinemeier Hansson	(Poland) Inter Europol Competition	11	9	11	16	2	4	32
10	(Switzerland) Fabio Scherer	(Poland) Inter Europol Competition	11	9	11	16	2	4	32
11	(United Kingdom) Jack Aitken	Racing Team Turkey	6	7	7	10		**6**	30
12	(Denmark) Nicklas Nielsen	(Italy) AF Corse	8	**14**	12	5	7	8	25
12	(France) François Perrodo	(Italy) AF Corse	8	**14**	12	5	7	8	25
12	(Italy) Alessio Rovera	(Italy) AF Corse	8	**14**	12	5	7	8	25
13	(Germany) Sophia Flörsch	(Portugal) Algarve Pro Racing	2	8	10	12			23
14	(United Kingdom) Richard Bradley	(France) Duqueine Team	12	6	Ret	6	9	9	20
14	(Mexico) Memo Rojas	(France) Duqueine Team	12	6	Ret	6	9	9	20
15	(Liechtenstein) Matthias Kaiser	(Belgium) Mühlner Motorsport	9	11	3	9	Ret	Ret	19
15	(France) Thomas Laurent	(Belgium) Mühlner Motorsport	9	11	3	9	Ret	Ret	19
15	(Belgium) Ugo de Wilde	(Belgium) Mühlner Motorsport	9	11	3	9	Ret	Ret	19
16	(United Kingdom) Matt Bell	(United Kingdom) Nielsen Racing	13	12	6	7	11	10	15
16	(United Kingdom) Ben Hanley	(United Kingdom) Nielsen Racing	13	12	6	7	11	10	15
16	(United States) Rodrigo Sales	(United Kingdom) Nielsen Racing	13	12	6	7	11	10	15
17	(Romania) Filip Ugran	(Portugal) Algarve Pro Racing					8	5	14
18	(France) Reshad de Gerus	(France) Duqueine Team	12	6	Ret				8
19	(Denmark) Anders Fjordbach	(France) Duqueine Team				6			8
20	(United Kingdom) Will Stevens	Racing Team Turkey					6		8
21	(Australia) James Allen	(Portugal) Algarve Pro Racing	17	15	9	8	10	Ret	7
21	(United States) John Falb	(Portugal) Algarve Pro Racing	17	15	9	8	10	Ret	7
21	(Australia) Alex Peroni	(Portugal) Algarve Pro Racing	17	15	9	8	10	Ret	7
22	(Switzerland) Mathias Beche	(France) TDS Racing x Vaillante	**10**	10	**13**	11	12	11	4
22	(France) Philippe Cimadomo	(France) TDS Racing x Vaillante	**10**	10	**13**	11	12	11	4
22	(Netherlands) Tijmen van der Helm	(France) TDS Racing x Vaillante	**10**	10	**13**	11	12	11	4
23	(France) Mathieu de Barbuat	(France) Duqueine Team					9		2
24	(Portugal) Rui Andrade	(France) Duqueine Team						9	2
25	(Italy) Sergio Campana	(United Kingdom) BHK Motorsport	14	16	14	15	13	12	0
25	(Italy) Francesco Dracone	(United Kingdom) BHK Motorsport	14	16	14	15	13	12	0
25	(Germany) Markus Pommer	(United Kingdom) BHK Motorsport	14	16	14	15	13	12	0
26	(France) Gabriel Aubry	(Poland) Team Virage	15	Ret	15	14	14	NC	0
26	(United States) Rob Hodes	(Poland) Team Virage	15	Ret	15	14	14	NC	0
27	(Malaysia) Jazeman Jaafar	(Poland) Team Virage	15	Ret	15				0
28	(Switzerland) David Droux	(France) Graff Racing	16	13	16				0
28	(Switzerland) Sébastien Page	(France) Graff Racing	16	13	16				0
28	(France) Eric Trouillet	(France) Graff Racing	16	13	16				0
29	(Guatemala) Ian Rodríguez	(Poland) Team Virage				14	14	NC	0
Pos.	Driver	Team	LEC (France)	IMO (Italy)	MNZ (Italy)	CAT (Spain)	SPA (Belgium)	POR (Portugal)	Points

Key
Colour	Result
Gold	Race winner
Silver	2nd place
Bronze	3rd place
Green	Points finish
Blue	Non-points finish
Blue	Non-classified finish (NC)
Purple	Did not finish (Ret)
Black	Disqualified (DSQ)
Black	Excluded (EX)
White	Did not start (DNS)
White	Race cancelled (C)
White	Withdrew (WD)
Blank	Did not participate

**Bold** – Pole

Italics – Fastest Lap

=== LMP2 Pro-Am Drivers Championship ===
Pos.	Driver	Team	LEC (France)	IMO (Italy)	MNZ (Italy)	CAT (Spain)	SPA (Belgium)	POR (Portugal)	Points
1	(Republic of Ireland) Charlie Eastwood	Racing Team Turkey	1	1	2	4	1	**1**	131
1	(Turkey) Salih Yoluç	Racing Team Turkey	1	1	2	4	1	**1**	131
2	(United Kingdom) Jack Aitken	Racing Team Turkey	1	1	2	4		**1**	106
3	(Denmark) Nicklas Nielsen	(Italy) AF Corse	2	5	4	1	2	2	101
3	(France) François Perrodo	(Italy) AF Corse	2	5	4	1	2	2	101
3	(Italy) Alessio Rovera	(Italy) AF Corse	2	5	4	1	2	2	101
4	(United Kingdom) Matt Bell	(United Kingdom) Nielsen Racing	4	3	1	2	4	3	97
4	(United Kingdom) Ben Hanley	(United Kingdom) Nielsen Racing	4	3	1	2	4	3	97
4	(United States) Rodrigo Sales	(United Kingdom) Nielsen Racing	4	3	1	2	4	3	97
5	(Switzerland) Mathias Beche	(France) TDS Racing x Vaillante	**3**	2	5	5	5	4	76
5	(France) Philippe Cimadomo	(France) TDS Racing x Vaillante	**3**	2	5	5	5	4	76
5	(Netherlands) Tijmen van der Helm	(France) TDS Racing x Vaillante	**3**	2	5	5	5	4	76
6	(Australia) James Allen	(Portugal) Algarve Pro Racing	7	6	3	3	3	Ret	59
6	(United States) John Falb	(Portugal) Algarve Pro Racing	7	6	3	3	3	Ret	59
6	(Australia) Alex Peroni	(Portugal) Algarve Pro Racing	7	6	3	3	3	Ret	59
7	(France) Gabriel Aubry	(Poland) Team Virage	5	Ret	6	6	6	NC	34
7	(United States) Rob Hodes	(Poland) Team Virage	5	Ret	6	6	6	NC	34
8	(Switzerland) David Droux	(France) Graff Racing	6	4	7				26
8	(Switzerland) Sébastien Page	(France) Graff Racing	6	4	7				26
8	(France) Eric Trouillet	(France) Graff Racing	6	4	7				26
9	(United Kingdom) Will Stevens	Racing Team Turkey					1		25
10	(Malaysia) Jazeman Jaafar	(Poland) Team Virage	5	Ret	6				18
11	(Guatemala) Ian Rodríguez	(Poland) Team Virage				6	6	NC	16
Pos.	Driver	Team	LEC (France)	IMO (Italy)	MNZ (Italy)	CAT (Spain)	SPA (Belgium)	POR (Portugal)	Points

Key
Colour	Result
Gold	Race winner
Silver	2nd place
Bronze	3rd place
Green	Points finish
Blue	Non-points finish
Blue	Non-classified finish (NC)
Purple	Did not finish (Ret)
Black	Disqualified (DSQ)
Black	Excluded (EX)
White	Did not start (DNS)
White	Race cancelled (C)
White	Withdrew (WD)
Blank	Did not participate

**Bold** – Pole

Italics – Fastest Lap

=== LMP3 Drivers Championship ===
Pos.	Driver	Team	LEC (France)	IMO (Italy)	MNZ (Italy)	CAT (Spain)	SPA (Belgium)	POR (Portugal)	Points
1	(United Kingdom) Mike Benham	(Switzerland) Cool Racing	**1**	**3**	**Ret**	**3**	**Ret**	**1**	86
1	(Denmark) Malthe Jakobsen	(Switzerland) Cool Racing	**1**	**3**	**Ret**	**3**	**Ret**	**1**	86
1	(United States) Maurice Smith	(Switzerland) Cool Racing	**1**	**3**	**Ret**	**3**	**Ret**	**1**	86
2	(United States) Charles Crews	(Poland) Inter Europol Competition	DSQ	8	1	1	1	Ret	79
2	(Portugal) Guilherme Oliveira	(Poland) Inter Europol Competition	DSQ	8	1	1	1	Ret	79
2	(Chile) Nico Pino	(Poland) Inter Europol Competition	DSQ	8	1	1	1	Ret	79
3	(Mexico) Sebastián Álvarez	(Luxembourg) DKR Engineering	9	5	8	2	2	6	60
3	(United Arab Emirates) Alexander Bukhantsov	(Luxembourg) DKR Engineering	9	5	8	2	2	6	60
4	(United Kingdom) Nick Adcock	(United Kingdom) RLR MSport	3	4	4	6	9	5	59
4	(Denmark) Michael Jensen	(United Kingdom) RLR MSport	3	4	4	6	9	5	59
4	(United Kingdom) Alex Kapadia	(United Kingdom) RLR MSport	3	4	4	6	9	5	59
5	(Belgium) Tom Van Rompuy	(Luxembourg) DKR Engineering	9	5		2	2	6	56
6	(United Kingdom) Andrew Bentley	(United Kingdom) United Autosports	7	1	Ret	Ret	5	4	53
6	(Netherlands) Kay van Berlo	(United Kingdom) United Autosports	7	1	Ret	Ret	5	4	53
7	(France) Antoine Doquin	(Switzerland) Cool Racing	Ret	2	6	Ret	4	3	53
7	(France) Jean-Ludovic Foubert	(Switzerland) Cool Racing	Ret	2	6	Ret	4	3	53
7	(Switzerland) Nicolas Maulini	(Switzerland) Cool Racing	Ret	2	6	Ret	4	3	53
8	(United Kingdom) Josh Caygill	(United Kingdom) United Autosports	2	Ret	5	9	Ret	2	48
8	(Germany) Finn Gehrsitz	(United Kingdom) United Autosports	2	Ret	5	9	Ret	2	48
8	(United Kingdom) Bailey Voisin	(United Kingdom) United Autosports	2	Ret	5	9	Ret	2	48
9	(United Kingdom) Ross Kaiser	(United Kingdom) 360 Racing	5	Ret	2	4	7	Ret	46
9	(United Kingdom) Terrence Woodward	(United Kingdom) 360 Racing	5	Ret	2	4	7	Ret	46
9	(United Kingdom) Mark Richards	(United Kingdom) 360 Racing	5	Ret	2	4	7		46
10	(Netherlands) Max Koebolt	(Italy) Eurointernational	Ret	7	3	7	6		35
10	(Switzerland) Jérôme de Sadeleer	(Italy) Eurointernational		7	3	7	6		35
11	(United Kingdom) James Littlejohn	(United Kingdom) Nielsen Racing	6	Ret	7		3	Ret	29
11	(United Kingdom) Anthony Wells	(United Kingdom) Nielsen Racing	6	Ret	7		3	Ret	29
12	(United States) James McGuire	(United Kingdom) United Autosports	7		Ret	Ret	5	4	28
13	(Spain) Xavier Lloveras	(Italy) Eurointernational	4	Ret	NC	5	10	9	25
14	(Netherlands) Glenn van Berlo	(Italy) Eurointernational	4	Ret	NC	5			22
15	(Germany) Valentino Catalano	(United Kingdom) RLR MSport	Ret	6	Ret	8	Ret	7	18
15	(Austria) Horst Felbermayr Jr.	(United Kingdom) RLR MSport	Ret	6	Ret	8	Ret	7	18
15	(United States) Austin McCusker	(United Kingdom) RLR MSport	Ret	6	Ret	8	Ret	7	18
16	(France) Noam Abramczyk	(Poland) Inter Europol Competition	8	Ret	Ret	10	8	8	13
16	(Canada) James Dayson	(Poland) Inter Europol Competition	8	Ret	Ret	10	8	8	13
16	(Poland) Mateusz Kaprzyk	(Poland) Inter Europol Competition	8	Ret	Ret	10	8	8	13
17	(Belgium) Tom Cloet	(Italy) Eurointernational	4						12
18	(United Kingdom) Freddie Hunt	(Italy) Eurointernational				5			10
19	(Spain) Santiago Concepción Serrano	(Italy) Eurointernational					6		8
19	(Spain) Santiago Concepción Serrano	(United Kingdom) 360 Racing						Ret	8
20	(France) Louis Rousset	(Italy) Eurointernational				7			6
21	(United Kingdom) James Winslow	(Luxembourg) DKR Engineering			8				4
22	(Portugal) Miguel Cristóvão	(Italy) Eurointernational					10	9	3
23	(France) Adrien Chila	(Italy) Eurointernational	Ret	Ret	NC				0
24	(Argentina) Marcos Siebert	(Italy) Eurointernational	Ret	WD					0
Pos.	Driver	Team	LEC (France)	IMO (Italy)	MNZ (Italy)	CAT (Spain)	SPA (Belgium)	POR (Portugal)	Points

Key
Colour	Result
Gold	Race winner
Silver	2nd place
Bronze	3rd place
Green	Points finish
Blue	Non-points finish
Blue	Non-classified finish (NC)
Purple	Did not finish (Ret)
Black	Disqualified (DSQ)
Black	Excluded (EX)
White	Did not start (DNS)
White	Race cancelled (C)
White	Withdrew (WD)
Blank	Did not participate

**Bold** – Pole

Italics – Fastest Lap

=== LMGTE Drivers Championship ===
Pos.	Driver	Team	LEC (France)	IMO (Italy)	MNZ (Italy)	CAT (Spain)	SPA (Belgium)	POR (Portugal)	Points
1	(Italy) Gianmaria Bruni	(Germany) Proton Competition	2	Ret	**2**	1	9	5	82
1	(Italy) Lorenzo Ferrari	(Germany) Proton Competition	2	Ret	**2**	1	9	5	82
1	(Germany) Christian Ried	(Germany) Proton Competition	2	Ret	**2**	1	9	5	82
2	(Denmark) Mikkel Jensen	(Switzerland) Kessel Racing	5	DSQ	3	4	**1**	3	78
2	(Denmark) Frederik Schandorff	(Switzerland) Kessel Racing	5	DSQ	3	4	**1**	3	78
3	(Belgium) Sarah Bovy	(Italy) Iron Lynx	4	8	5	Ret	2	**1**	70
3	(Denmark) Michelle Gatting	(Italy) Iron Lynx	4	8	5	Ret	2	**1**	70
4	(Italy) Matteo Cressoni	(Italy) Iron Lynx	7	5	1	6	9	4	63
4	(Italy) Davide Rigon	(Italy) Iron Lynx	7	5	1	6	9	4	63
4	(Italy) Claudio Schiavoni	(Italy) Iron Lynx	7	5	1	6	9	4	63
5	(Oman) Ahmad Al Harthy	Oman Racing with TF Sport	Ret	**1**	10	10	4	2	59
5	(United Kingdom) Sam De Haan	Oman Racing with TF Sport	Ret	**1**	10	10	4	2	59
5	(Denmark) Marco Sørensen	Oman Racing with TF Sport	Ret	**1**	10	10	4	2	59
6	(Japan) Takeshi Kimura	(Switzerland) Kessel Racing	5	DSQ	3	4		3	52
7	(Indonesia) Andrew Haryanto	(Hong Kong) Absolute Racing	8	Ret	4	5	3	6	49
7	(Belgium) Alessio Picariello	(Hong Kong) Absolute Racing	8	Ret	4	5	3	6	49
7	(Estonia) Martin Rump	(Hong Kong) Absolute Racing	8	Ret	4	5	3	6	49
8	(Singapore) Sean Hudspeth	(United Kingdom) JMW Motorsport	10	4	7	3	6	7	48
8	(Italy) Giacomo Petrobelli	(United Kingdom) JMW Motorsport	10	4	7	3	6	7	48
9	(France) Doriane Pin	(Italy) Iron Lynx				Ret	2	**1**	44
10	(United Kingdom) Duncan Cameron	(Switzerland) Spirit of Race	9	3	8	2			39
10	(Republic of Ireland) Matt Griffin	(Switzerland) Spirit of Race	9	3	8	2			39
10	(South Africa) David Perel	(Switzerland) Spirit of Race	9	3	8	2			39
11	(Argentina) Nicolás Varrone	(Germany) Rinaldi Racing	**1**	Ret	6	9	10	9	39
12	(Germany) Pierre Ehret	(Germany) Rinaldi Racing	**1**	Ret	6	9	10		37
13	(United Kingdom) Jonathan Adam	Oman Racing with TF Sport	6	2	11	7	8	10	37
13	(Portugal) Henrique Chaves	Oman Racing with TF Sport	6	2	11	7	8	10	37
13	(United Kingdom) John Hartshorne	Oman Racing with TF Sport	6	2	11	7	8	10	37
14	(Republic of Ireland) Michael Fassbender	(Germany) Proton Competition	3	7	Ret	8	7	8	35
14	(Austria) Richard Lietz	(Germany) Proton Competition	3	7	Ret	8	7	8	35
14	(Canada) Zacharie Robichon	(Germany) Proton Competition	3	7	Ret	8	7	8	35
15	(New Zealand) Matthew Payne	(United Kingdom) JMW Motorsport	10	4	7		6	7	33
16	(United States) Memo Gidley	(Germany) Rinaldi Racing	**1**						26
17	(United States) Conrad Grunewald	(Switzerland) Kessel Racing					**1**		26
18	(Switzerland) Rahel Frey	(Italy) Iron Lynx	4	8	5				26
19	(Spain) Miguel Molina	(United Kingdom) JMW Motorsport				3			15
20	(Italy) Fabrizio Crestani	(Germany) Rinaldi Racing	11	6	9			Ret	12
20	(Germany) Christian Hook	(Germany) Rinaldi Racing	11	6	9			Ret	12
21	(Colombia) Óscar Tunjo	(Germany) Rinaldi Racing	11	6					8
22	(Italy) Gabriele Lancieri	(Germany) Rinaldi Racing		Ret	6				8
23	(Italy) Diego Alessi	(Germany) Rinaldi Racing				9	10	9	5
24	(Netherlands) Jeroen Bleekemolen	(Germany) Rinaldi Racing			9			Ret	2
Pos.	Driver	Team	LEC (France)	IMO (Italy)	MNZ (Italy)	CAT (Spain)	SPA (Belgium)	POR (Portugal)	Points

Key
Colour	Result
Gold	Race winner
Silver	2nd place
Bronze	3rd place
Green	Points finish
Blue	Non-points finish
Blue	Non-classified finish (NC)
Purple	Did not finish (Ret)
Black	Disqualified (DSQ)
Black	Excluded (EX)
White	Did not start (DNS)
White	Race cancelled (C)
White	Withdrew (WD)
Blank	Did not participate

**Bold** – Pole

Italics – Fastest Lap

== Teams' Championships ==
Points are awarded according to the following structure:

Position	**1st**	**2nd**	**3rd**	**4th**	**5th**	**6th**	**7th**	**8th**	**9th**	**10th**	**Pole**
Points	25	18	15	12	10	8	6	4	2	1	1

=== LMP2 Teams Championship ===
Pos.	Team	Car	LEC (France)	IMO (Italy)	MNZ (Italy)	CAT (Spain)	SPA (Belgium)	POR (Portugal)	Points
1	(Italy) #9 Prema Racing	Oreca 07	1	1	5	1	3	1	125
2	(France) #65 Panis Racing	Oreca 07	3	4	2	**2**	4	2	94
3	(United Kingdom) #22 United Autosports	Oreca 07	7	2	4	4	1	Ret	73
4	(Switzerland) #37 Cool Racing	Oreca 07	5	3	8	3	**5**	3	70
5	(France) #28 IDEC Sport	Oreca 07	4	5	1	13	Ret	7	53
6	#34 Racing Team Turkey	Oreca 07	6	7	7	10	6	**6**	38
7	(Portugal) #19 Algarve Pro Racing	Oreca 07	2	8	10	12	8	5	37
8	(Poland) #43 Inter Europol Competition	Oreca 07	11	9	11	16	2	4	32
9	(Italy) #88 AF Corse	Oreca 07	8	**14**	12	5	7	8	25
10	(France) #30 Duqueine Team	Oreca 07	12	6	Ret	6	9	9	20
11	(Belgium) #21 Mühlner Motorsport	Oreca 07	9	11	3	9	Ret	Ret	19
12	(United Kingdom) #24 Nielsen Racing	Oreca 07	13	12	6	7	11	10	15
13	(Portugal) #47 Algarve Pro Racing	Oreca 07	17	15	9	8	10	Ret	7
14	(France) #31 TDS Racing x Vaillante	Oreca 07	**10**	10	**13**	11	12	11	4
15	(United Kingdom) #35 BHK Motorsport	Oreca 07	14	16	14	15	13	12	0
16	(Poland) #51 Team Virage	Oreca 07	15	Ret	15	14	14	NC	0
17	(France) #40 Graff Racing	Oreca 07	16	13	16				0
Pos.	Team	Car	LEC (France)	IMO (Italy)	MNZ (Italy)	CAT (Spain)	SPA (Belgium)	POR (Portugal)	Points

Key
Colour	Result
Gold	Race winner
Silver	2nd place
Bronze	3rd place
Green	Points finish
Blue	Non-points finish
Blue	Non-classified finish (NC)
Purple	Did not finish (Ret)
Black	Disqualified (DSQ)
Black	Excluded (EX)
White	Did not start (DNS)
White	Race cancelled (C)
White	Withdrew (WD)
Blank	Did not participate

**Bold** – Pole

Italics – Fastest Lap

=== LMP2 Pro-Am Teams Championship ===
Pos.	Team	Car	LEC (France)	IMO (Italy)	MNZ (Italy)	CAT (Spain)	SPA (Belgium)	POR (Portugal)	Points
1	#34 Racing Team Turkey	Oreca 07	1	1	2	4	1	**1**	131
2	(Italy) #88 AF Corse	Oreca 07	2	5	4	1	2	2	101
3	(United Kingdom) #24 Nielsen Racing	Oreca 07	4	3	1	2	4	3	97
4	(France) #31 TDS Racing x Vaillante	Oreca 07	**3**	2	5	5	5	4	76
5	(Portugal) #47 Algarve Pro Racing	Oreca 07	7	6	3	3	3	Ret	59
6	(Poland) #51 Team Virage	Oreca 07	5	Ret	6	6	6	NC	34
7	(France) #40 Graff Racing	Oreca 07	6	4	7				26
Pos.	Team	Car	LEC (France)	IMO (Italy)	MNZ (Italy)	CAT (Spain)	SPA (Belgium)	POR (Portugal)	Points

Key
Colour	Result
Gold	Race winner
Silver	2nd place
Bronze	3rd place
Green	Points finish
Blue	Non-points finish
Blue	Non-classified finish (NC)
Purple	Did not finish (Ret)
Black	Disqualified (DSQ)
Black	Excluded (EX)
White	Did not start (DNS)
White	Race cancelled (C)
White	Withdrew (WD)
Blank	Did not participate

**Bold** – Pole

Italics – Fastest Lap

=== LMP3 Teams Championship ===
Pos.	Team	Car	LEC (France)	IMO (Italy)	MNZ (Italy)	CAT (Spain)	SPA (Belgium)	POR (Portugal)	Points
1	(Switzerland) #17 Cool Racing	Ligier JS P320	**1**	**3**	**Ret**	**3**	**Ret**	**1**	86
2	(Poland) #13 Inter Europol Competition	Ligier JS P320	DSQ	8	1	1	1	Ret	79
3	(Luxembourg) #4 DKR Engineering	Duqueine M30 - D08	9	5	8	2	2	6	60
4	(United Kingdom) #5 RLR MSport	Ligier JS P320	3	4	4	6	9	5	59
5	(United Kingdom) #3 United Autosports	Ligier JS P320	7	1	Ret	Ret	5	4	53
6	(Switzerland) #27 Cool Racing	Ligier JS P320	Ret	2	6	Ret	4	3	53
7	(United Kingdom) #2 United Autosports	Ligier JS P320	2	Ret	5	9	Ret	2	48
8	(United Kingdom) #6 360 Racing	Ligier JS P320	5	Ret	2	4	7	Ret	46
9	(Italy) #11 Eurointernational	Ligier JS P320	Ret	7	3	7	6	DNS	35
10	(United Kingdom) #7 Nielsen Racing	Ligier JS P320	6	Ret	7		3	Ret	29
11	(Italy) #10 Eurointernational	Ligier JS P320	4	Ret	NC	5	10	9	25
12	(United Kingdom) #15 RLR MSport	Ligier JS P320	Ret	6	Ret	8	NC	7	18
13	(Poland) #14 Inter Europol Competition	Ligier JS P320	8	Ret	Ret	10	8	8	13
Pos.	Team	Car	LEC (France)	IMO (Italy)	MNZ (Italy)	CAT (Spain)	SPA (Belgium)	POR (Portugal)	Points

Key
Colour	Result
Gold	Race winner
Silver	2nd place
Bronze	3rd place
Green	Points finish
Blue	Non-points finish
Blue	Non-classified finish (NC)
Purple	Did not finish (Ret)
Black	Disqualified (DSQ)
Black	Excluded (EX)
White	Did not start (DNS)
White	Race cancelled (C)
White	Withdrew (WD)
Blank	Did not participate

**Bold** – Pole

Italics – Fastest Lap

=== LMGTE Teams Championship ===
Pos.	Team	Car	LEC (France)	IMO (Italy)	MNZ (Italy)	CAT (Spain)	SPA (Belgium)	POR (Portugal)	Points
1	(Germany) #77 Proton Competition	Porsche 911 RSR-19	2	Ret	**2**	1	5	5	82
2	(Switzerland) #57 Kessel Racing	Ferrari 488 GTE Evo	5	DSQ	3	4	**1**	3	78
3	(Italy) #83 Iron Lynx	Ferrari 488 GTE Evo	4	8	5	Ret	2	**1**	70
4	(Italy) #60 Iron Lynx	Ferrari 488 GTE Evo	7	5	1	6	9	4	63
5	#69 Oman Racing with TF Sport	Aston Martin Vantage AMR	Ret	**1**	10	**10**	4	2	59
6	(Hong Kong) #18 Absolute Racing	Porsche 911 RSR-19	8	Ret	4	5	3	6	49
7	(United Kingdom) #66 JMW Motorsport	Ferrari 488 GTE Evo	10	4	7	3	6	7	48
8	(Germany) #32 Rinaldi Racing	Ferrari 488 GTE Evo	**1**	Ret	6	9	10	9	39
9	(Switzerland) #55 Spirit of Race	Ferrari 488 GTE Evo	9	3	8	2	WD	WD	39
10	#95 Oman Racing with TF Sport	Aston Martin Vantage AMR	6	2	11	7	8	Ret	36
11	(Germany) #93 Proton Competition	Porsche 911 RSR-19	3	7	Ret	8	7	8	35
12	(Germany) #33 Rinaldi Racing	Ferrari 488 GTE Evo	11	6	9		WD	Ret	10
Pos.	Team	Car	LEC (France)	IMO (Italy)	MNZ (Italy)	CAT (Spain)	SPA (Belgium)	POR (Portugal)	Points

Key
Colour	Result
Gold	Race winner
Silver	2nd place
Bronze	3rd place
Green	Points finish
Blue	Non-points finish
Blue	Non-classified finish (NC)
Purple	Did not finish (Ret)
Black	Disqualified (DSQ)
Black	Excluded (EX)
White	Did not start (DNS)
White	Race cancelled (C)
White	Withdrew (WD)
Blank	Did not participate

**Bold** – Pole

Italics – Fastest Lap
