= Aston Martin Vantage GTE (2018) =

Endurance Grand Tourer developed by Aston Martin Racing

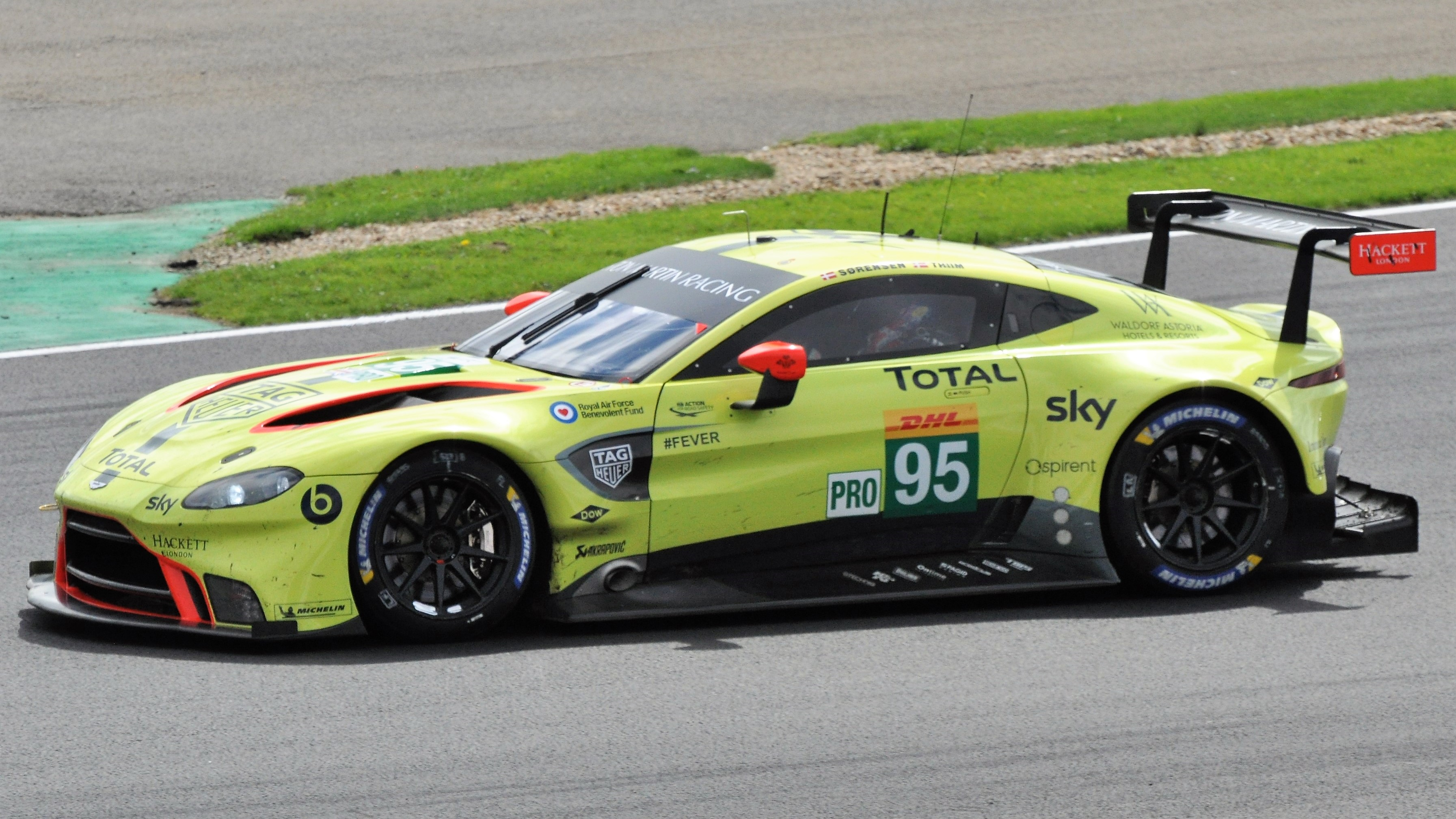
- #95 Aston Martin Racing Aston Martin Vantage GTE at Silverstone
- Category: LM GTE
- Constructor: Aston Martin (Prodrive)
- Designer: Dan Sayers
- Predecessor: Aston Martin Vantage GT2
- Successor: Aston Martin Vantage AMR GT3 (LM GT3)

Technical specifications
- Chassis: Bonded aluminium chassis with carbon fibre panels
- Suspension (front): Double wishbone with 5-way adjustable Ohlins dampers
- Suspension (rear): Double wishbone with 5-way adjustable Ohlins dampers
- Engine: Mercedes AMG M177 4,000 cc (4.0 L), all aluminium, 32 valve 90° V8, Turbocharged, Front mid-mounted
- Transmission: Xtrac 6-speed sequential manual
- Power: 536 hp (543.4 PS; 399.7 kW) @ 6,000 rpm 700 N⋅m (516.3 lb⋅ft) @ 2,000-5,000 rpm
- Weight: ACO regulated base weight 1,245 kg (2,745 lb)
- Fuel: Total Excellium 98 unleaded
- Lubricants: Total Quartz 9000
- Tyres: Michelin radial 30/68-18 front, 31/71-18 rear TWS forged magnesium wheels 12.5" x 18" front, 13.0" x 18" rear

Competition history
- Notable entrants: (United Kingdom) Aston Martin Racing; (United Kingdom) TF Sport
- Notable drivers: (United Kingdom) Darren Turner; (United Kingdom) Jonathan Adam; (United Kingdom) Alex Lynn; (Belgium) Maxime Martin; (Denmark) Marco Sørensen; (Denmark) Nicki Thiim
- Debut: 2018 6 Hours of Spa-Francorchamps
- First win: 2018 6 Hours of Shanghai
- Last win: 2022 6 Hours of Fuji
- Last event: 2023 8 Hours of Bahrain
| Races | Wins | Poles |
|---|---|---|
| 55 | 15 | 4 |
- Teams' Championships: 1 (2022 FIA WEC (LMGTE Am))
- Constructors' Championships: 1 (2019–20 FIA WEC)
- Drivers' Championships: 2 (2019–20 FIA WEC, 2022 FIA WEC (LMGTE Am))

The Aston Martin Vantage GTE (also known as the Aston Martin Vantage AMR) is an endurance Grand Tourer developed by Aston Martin Racing, the motorsports arm of the British automobile manufacturer Aston Martin. It is based on the Aston Martin Vantage, and is the successor of the Aston Martin Vantage GT2 and its later derivatives. The car was launched on the 22nd of November 2017, alongside its road-going counterpart in London. The car is noted to be capable of being converted from Group GTE specification to Group GT3 specification.

== Development History ==
The Aston Martin Vantage GTE was developed in tandem with the Vantage road car, between Aston Martin Racing and the Aston Martin headquarters in Gaydon, with the car being entirely developed in house by the two companies. The car had its initial shakedown in the UK, at the Rockingham Motor Speedway, and subsequently had 2 30 hour endurance tests during its development, at the Circuito de Andalucia and then the Circuito de Navarra in Spain during October 2017. This was also complemented by tests at the Sebring International Raceway in Florida, with the team praising the durability and reliability of the car. Ahead of its official World Endurance Championship debut, at the WEC Prologue held at the Circuit Paul Ricard, the car was revealed to have completed over 20,000 km in pre-season test, with testing being held at the Yas Marina Circuit in Abu Dhabi, Motorland Aragon, and the Algarve International Circuit.

At the 2019 24 Hours of Le Mans Test Day, the team debuted a new low-downforce kit, designed to reduce the overall drag on the car, due to the previous aerokit being a revised WEC Sprint kit, with Le Mans specific revisions. The kit was tested at Monza, and was found to be highly effective compared to the kit used at the 2018 edition of the race.

== Competition History ==
=== Complete World Endurance Championship results ===
(key) Races in bold indicates pole position. Races in italics indicates fastest lap.

| Year | Entrant | Class | Drivers | No. | Rounds | | | | | | | | Pts. | Pos. |
| Year | Entrant | Class | Drivers | No. | 1 | 2 | 3 | 4 | 5 | 6 | 7 | 8 | Pts. | Pos. |
|---|---|---|---|---|---|---|---|---|---|---|---|---|---|---|
| 2018 - 2019 | (United Kingdom) Aston Martin Racing | LMGTE Pro | (Denmark) Marco Sørensen (Denmark) Nicki Thiim (United Kingdom) Darren Turner | 95 | SPA; 7 | LMS; 8 | SIL; 8 | **FUJ**; **6** | SHA; 1 | SEB; 10 | SPA; 7 | **LMS**; **Ret** | 65.5 | 9th |
| 2018 - 2019 | (United Kingdom) Aston Martin Racing | LMGTE Pro | (United Kingdom) Alex Lynn (Belgium) Maxime Martin (United Kingdom) Jonathan Adam | 97 | SPA; 6 | LMS; 12 | SIL; 4 | FUJ; 9 | SHA; 4 | SEB; 9 | SPA; 1 | LMS; 11 | 66 | 8th |
| 2019 - 2020 | (United Kingdom) Aston Martin Racing | LMGTE Pro | (Denmark) Marco Sørensen (Denmark) Nicki Thiim (United Kingdom) Richard Westbrook | 95 | SIL; 5 | FUJ; 1 | SHA; 5 | BHR; 1 | COTA; **1** | SPA; 2 | LMN; 3 | BHR; 5 | 172 | 1st |
| 2019 - 2020 | (United Kingdom) Aston Martin Racing | LMGTE Pro | (United Kingdom) Alex Lynn (Belgium) Maxime Martin (United Kingdom) Harry Tincknell (United Kingdom) Richard Westbrook | 97 | SIL; 3 | FUJ; 3 | SHA; 4 | BHR; 3 | COTA; 4 | SPA; 3 | LMN; 1 | BHR; 4 | 160 | 2nd |
| 2019 - 2020 | (United Kingdom) TF Sport | LMGTE Am | (United Kingdom) Jonathan Adam (Republic of Ireland) Charlie Eastwood (Turkey) Salih Yoluç | 90 | **SIL**; **7** | **FUJ**; **1** | SHA; 1 | BHR; Ret | COTA; 1 | SPA; 3 | LMN; 1 | BHR; 8 | 154 | 2nd |
| 2019 - 2020 | (United Kingdom) Aston Martin Racing | LMGTE Am | (Canada) Paul Dalla Lana (United Kingdom) Ross Gunn (United Kingdom) Darren Turner (Brazil) Augusto Farfus (Portugal) Pedro Lamy | 98 | SIL; 2 | FUJ; 11 | SHA; 3 | BHR; 2 | COTA; 2 | SPA; 9 | LMN; 6 | **BHR**; **9** | 100.5 | 6th |
| 2021 | (United Kingdom) TF Sport | LMGTE Am | (Brazil) Felipe Fraga (United States) Ben Keating (Luxembourg) Dylan Pereira | 33 | **SPA**; **2** | POR; 7 | **MNZ**; **12** | LMN; 2 | BHR; 1 | BHR; Ret | | | 90.5 | 2nd |
| 2021 | (United Kingdom) Aston Martin Racing | LMGTE Am | (Brazil) Marcos Gomes (Canada) Paul Dalla Lana (Brazil) Augusto Farfus (Denmark) Nicki Thiim | 98 | SPA; 6 | POR; 4 | MNZ; 2 | LMN; Ret | BHR; 4 | BHR; 10 | | | 58 | 8th |
| 2021 | (Japan) D'station Racing | LMGTE Am | (Japan) Tomonobu Fujii (Japan) Satoshi Hoshino (United Kingdom) Andrew Watson | 777 | SPA; 7 | POR; Ret | MNZ; 3 | LMN; 5 | BHR; 10 | BHR; 7 | | | 51 | 9th |
| 2022 | (United Kingdom) TF Sport | LMGTE Am | (United States) Ben Keating (Denmark) Marco Sørensen (France) Florian Latorre (Portugal) Henrique Chaves | 33 | **SEB**; **2** | **SPA**; **2** | LMN; 1 | MON; Ret | **FUJ**; **1** | BAH; 4 | | | 141 | 1st |
| 2022 | (Canada) Northwest AMR | LMGTE Am | (Canada) Paul Dalla Lana (Denmark) Nicki Thiim (United Kingdom) David Pittard | 98 | SEB; 1 | SPA; 3 | LMN; 3 | MON; 8 | FUJ; 5 | BAH; 5 | | | 118 | 2nd |
| 2022 | (Japan) D'Station Racing | LMGTE Am | (United Kingdom) Charlie Fagg (Japan) Tomonobu Fujii (Japan) Satoshi Hoshino | 777 | SEB; 6 | SPA; 7 | LMN; Ret | MON; 11 | FUJ; 3 | BAH; 10 | | | 35 | 10th |
| 2023 | (Oman) ORT by TF | LMGTE Am | (Oman) Ahmad Al Harthy (United States) Michael Dinan (Republic of Ireland) Charlie Eastwood | 25 | SEB; 9 | POR; 8 | SPA; 3 | LMN; 2 | MZA; 7 | FUJ; 13 | BHR; NC | | 65 | 5th |
| 2023 | (Canada) NorthWest AMR | LMGTE Am | (Canada) Paul Dalla Lana (Zimbabwe) Axcil Jefferies (Denmark) Nicki Thiim (United Kingdom) Ian James (Italy) Daniel Mancinelli (Spain) Alex Riberas | 98 | SEB; 11 | POR; 13 | SPA; 7 | LMN; 6 | MZA | FUJ; 7 | BHR; 3 | | 51 | 9th |
| 2023 | (Japan) D'Station Racing | LMGTE Am | (Japan) Tomonobu Fujii (United Kingdom) Casper Stevenson (Japan) Satoshi Hoshino (Australia) Liam Talbot | 777 | SEB; 10 | POR; NC | SPA; 10 | LMN; Ret | MZA; Ret | FUJ; 10 | BHR; 2 | | 31 | 12th |

=== Complete European Le Mans Series results ===
(key) Races in bold indicates pole position. Races in italics indicates fastest lap.

| Year | Entrant | Class | Drivers | No. | Rounds | | | | | | Pts. | Pos. |
| Year | Entrant | Class | Drivers | No. | 1 | 2 | 3 | 4 | 5 | 6 | Pts. | Pos. |
|---|---|---|---|---|---|---|---|---|---|---|---|---|
| 2020 | (United Kingdom) Aston Martin Racing | LMGTE | (Canada) Paul Dalla Lana (Austria) Mathias Lauda (United Kingdom) Ross Gunn (Brazil) Augusto Farfus | 98 | RIC; Ret | SPA; 3 | LEC | MNZ | POR | | 0 | NC |
| 2021 | (United Kingdom) TF Sport | LMGTE | (United Kingdom) Ollie Hancock (United Kingdom) John Hartshorne (United Kingdom) Ross Gunn (United Kingdom) Jonathan Adam | 95 | CAT; 8 | RBR; 8 | **LEC**; **7** | MNZ; 8 | SPA; 8 | **POR**; **7** | 30 | 9th |
| 2022 | Oman Racing with TF Sport | LMGTE | (Oman) Ahmad Al Harthy (United Kingdom) Sam De Haan (Denmark) Marco Sørensen | 69 | LEC; Ret | **IMO**; **1** | MNZ; 10 | **CAT**; **10** | SPA; 4 | POR; 5 | 59 | 5th |
| 2022 | Oman Racing with TF Sport | LMGTE | (United Kingdom) Jonathan Adam (Portugal) Henrique Chaves (United Kingdom) John Hartshorne | 95 | LEC; 6 | IMO; 2 | MNZ; 11 | CAT; 7 | SPA; 8 | POR; Ret | 36 | 10th |
| 2023 | (Denmark) GMB Motorsport | LMGTE | (Denmark) Gustav Birch (Denmark) Jens Reno Møller (Denmark) Nicki Thiim | 44 | CAT; Ret | LEC; 12 | ARA; 8 | SPA; Ret | ALG; 8 | POR; 5 | 18 | 12th |
| 2023 | (United Kingdom) TF Sport | LMGTE | (France) Valentin Hasse-Clot (France) Arnold Robin (France) Maxime Robin | 72 | CAT; Ret | LEC; 7 | ARA; 9 | SPA; 6 | **ALG**; **5** | POR; 10 | 28 | 10th |
| 2023 | (United Kingdom) TF Sport | LMGTE | (United Kingdom) Jonathan Adam (United Kingdom) John Hartshorne (United Kingdom) Ben Tuck | 95 | CAT; 9 | LEC; 3 | ARA; 11 | SPA; 9 | ALG; 10 | POR; 6 | 28 | 9th |
