= Philippe Cimadomo =

French racing driver

- Nationality: (France) French
- Born: Philippe François Michel Cimadomo; 5 December 1959 (age 66) Grenoble, France

European Le Mans Series career
- Debut season: 2022
- Current team: TDS Racing x Vaillante
- Categorisation: FIA Bronze
- Car number: 31
- Starts: 6 (6 entries)
- Wins: 0
- Podiums: 0
- Poles: 0
- Fastest laps: 0
- Best finish: 14th (LMP2) in 2022

Previous series
- 2017, 2019 2019 2017–2018: Michelin Le Mans Cup; Ultimate Cup Series; V de V Endurance Series

Philippe François Michel Cimadomo (born 5 December 1959) is a French businessman and racing driver who last competed in the European Le Mans Series with TDS Racing x Vaillante. He is notable for being excluded from competing at the 2022 24 Hours of Le Mans after being involved in a number of incidents during practice.

Cimadomo was the CEO of French software company Metrologic Group, which he co-founded in 1980.

== Racing record ==
=== Racing career summary ===
Season	Series	Team	Races	Wins	Poles	F/Laps	Podiums	Points	Position
2013	V de V Endurance GT Tourisme - S1	Defi Autosport	?	?	?	?	?	0	?
2013	V de V Michelin Endurance Series - Challenge Endurance GT/Tourisme V de V	Defi Autosport	3	0	0	0	0	1.5	50th
2013	Dubai 24 Hour - SP2	Defi Autosport	1	0	0	0	0	N/A	DNF
2015	24H Series - SP3	Nova Race	2	1	0	0	1	0	NC†
2016	V de V Challenge Endurance Moderne - Proto	TFT	7	0	0	0	0	69.5	16th
2017	Le Mans Cup - LMP3	Graff	2	0	0	0	0	1	39th
2017	V de V Endurance Series - LMP3	Graff	1	0	0	0	0	19	28th
2017	V de V Proto Endurance Challenge	TFT Racing	6	0	0	0	1	0	NC†
2018	V de V Endurance Series - LMP3	TFT	2	0	0	0	0	0	NC†
2019	Ultimate Cup Series - Challenge Proto-LMP3	Team Virage	6	0	0	0	0	16	31st
2019	Ultimate Cup Series - Challenge Proto-LMP3-U	Team Virage	1	0	0	0	0	2	5th
2019	Le Mans Cup - LMP3	Cool Racing	3	0	0	0	0	2	27th
2022	European Le Mans Series - LMP2	TDS Racing x Vaillante	6	0	0	0	0	4	22nd
2023	Le Mans Cup - LMP3	MV2S Racing	2	0	0	0	0	0	NC
2024	Ultimate Cup Series - Proto NP02	MV2S	6	0	0	1	0	14.5	27th
2026	European Endurance Prototype Cup	CD Sport							

^{†} As Cimadomo was a guest driver, he was ineligible to score points.
^{*} Season still in progress.

=== Complete European Le Mans Series results ===
(key) (Races in bold indicate pole position; results in italics indicate fastest lap)

Year	Entrant	Chassis	Engine	Class	1	2	3	4	5	6	Rank	Points
2022	TDS Racing x Vaillante	Oreca 07	Gibson GK428 V8	LMP2	LEC; 10	IMO; 10	MNZ; 13	CAT; 11	SPA; 12	ALG; 11	22nd	4
2022	TDS Racing x Vaillante	Oreca 07	Gibson GK428 V8	Pro-Am Cup	3	2	5	5	5	4	5th	76
