= Michael Jensen (racing driver) =

Danish racing driver (born 1975)

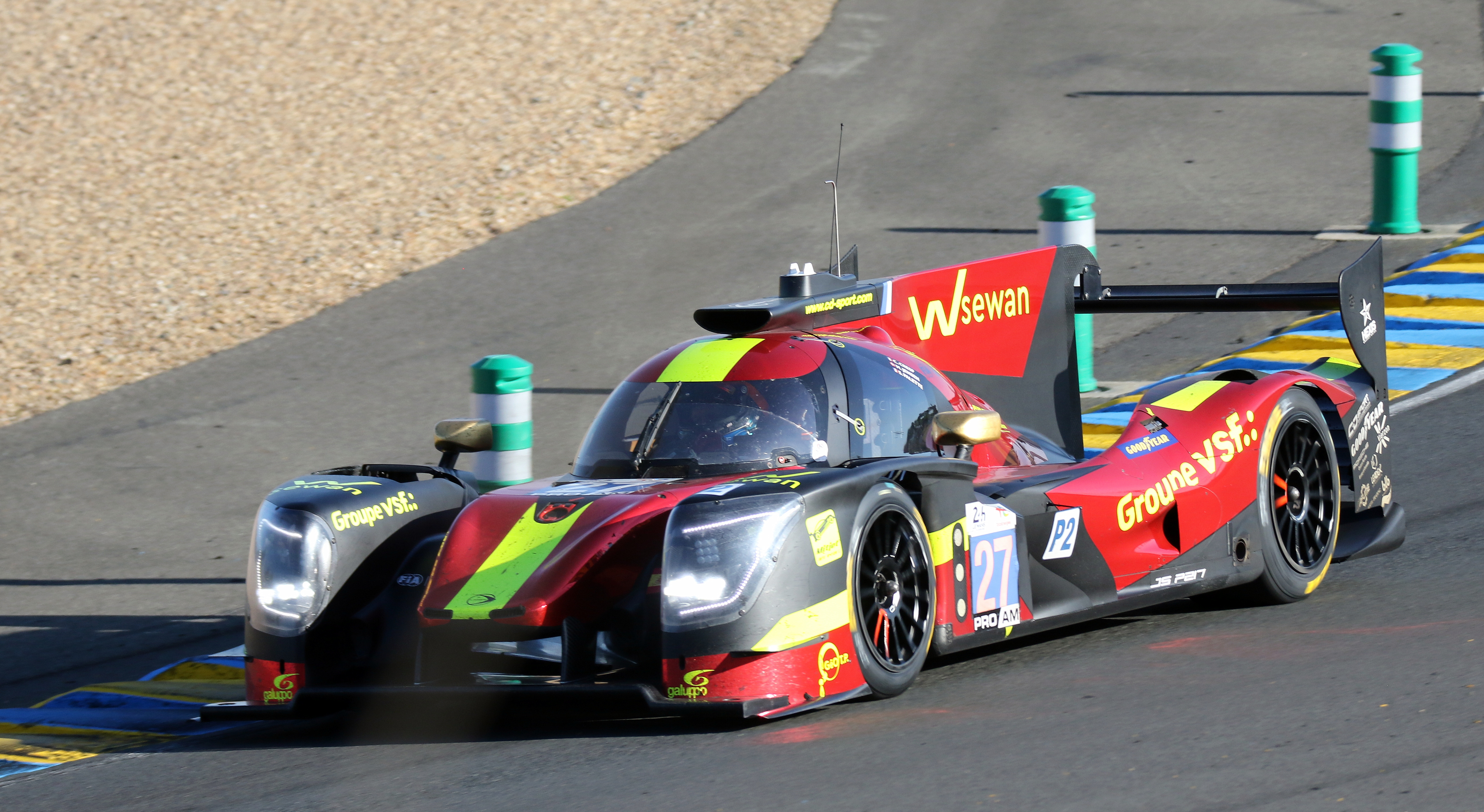
- Jensen in 2022
- Nationality: (Denmark) Danish
- Born: 5 February 1975 (age 51) Næstved, Denmark

European Le Mans Series career
- Categorisation: FIA Bronze
- Years active: 2022–
- Teams: RLR MSport; Team Virage; Algarve Pro Racing
- Starts: 24
- Wins: 1
- Podiums: 6
- Poles: 2
- Fastest laps: 0
- Best finish: 1st in 2024 (LMP3)

Previous series
- 2019–2021 2018: Le Mans Cup; 24H TCE Series

Championship titles
- 2024–25 2024: Asian Le Mans Series – LMP2; European Le Mans Series – LMP3

Michael Jensen (born 5 February 1975) is a Danish racing driver who currently competes in the European Le Mans Series for Algarve Pro Racing.

A long-term teammate of Nick Adcock, the pair won the 2023 Kyalami 9 Hours in NP02 and the 2024 European Le Mans Series in LMP3. Jensen then graduated to LMP2, and was crowned 2024–25 Asian Le Mans Series champion with Algarve Pro Racing.

== Racing record ==
=== Racing career summary ===
Season	Series	Team	Races	Wins	Poles	F/Laps	Podiums	Points	Position
2018	24H TCE Series – SP3	CWS Engineering	1	0	0	0	0	0	NC
2019	Le Mans Cup – LMP3	CD Sport	2	0	0	0	0	0	NC
2020	Le Mans Cup – LMP3	CD Sport	7	0	0	0	0	1.5	41st
2021	Asian Le Mans Series – LMP3	CD Sport	4	0	0	0	0	26	8th
2021	Le Mans Cup – LMP3	CD Sport	7	0	0	0	0	22.5	15th
2022	Asian Le Mans Series – LMP3	CD Sport	4	1	0	0	3	65	**2nd**
2022	European Le Mans Series – LMP3	RLR MSport	6	0	0	0	1	59	4th
2022	24 Hours of Le Mans – LMP2 Pro-Am	CD Sport	1	0	0	0	0	N/A	9th
2023	Asian Le Mans Series – LMP3	CD Sport	4	0	0	0	1	27	6th
2023	European Le Mans Series – LMP3	Team Virage	6	0	2	0	0	30	11th
2023	Ultimate Cup Series Endurance Prototype Challenge – NP02	CD Sport	4	1	0	0	1	59	9th
2023	SAES Nine Hours of Kyalami	Adjust4Sleep / Rico Barlow Racing	1	1	1	0	1	N/A	**1st**
2023–24	Asian Le Mans Series – LMP3	CD Sport	5	2	0	0	5	101	**2nd**
2024	European Le Mans Series – LMP3	RLR MSport	6	1	2	0	3	99	**1st**
2024	Ultimate Cup Series Endurance Prototype Challenge – NP02	CD Sport	5	0	0	0	1	24	23rd
2024	SAES Nine Hours of Kyalami	Adjust4Sleep / Rico Barlow Racing	1	0	1	0	1	N/A	**2nd**
2024–25	Asian Le Mans Series – LMP2	Algarve Pro Racing	6	3	0	0	3	109	**1st**
2025	European Le Mans Series – LMP3	RLR MSport	6	0	0	0	2	48	8th
2025	Ultimate Cup Series Endurance Prototype Challenge – NP02	CD Sport	2	0	0	0	0	6	40th
2025	24 Hours of Le Mans – LMP2 Pro-Am	RLR MSport	1	0	0	0	0	N/A	7th
2025–26	Asian Le Mans Series – LMP2	Algarve Pro Racing	6	0	0	1	3	74	**3rd**
2026	European Le Mans Series – LMP2 Pro-Am	Algarve Pro Racing	6	2	0	0	4	86	**1st**
2026	24 Hours of Le Mans – LMP2 Pro-Am	Algarve Pro Racing	1	0	0	0	0	N/A	4th
2026	European Endurance Prototype Cup	CD Sport	5	0	0	0	0	2.75*	53rd*
2026–27	Asian Le Mans Series - LMP2	Algarve Pro Racing							

* Season still in progress.

=== Complete Asian Le Mans Series results ===
(key) (Races in bold indicate pole position) (Races in italics indicate fastest lap)

Year	Team	Class	Car	Engine	1	2	3	4	5	6	Pos.	Points
2021	CD Sport	LMP3	Ligier JS P320	Nissan VK56DE 5.6 L V8	DUB; 1; 7	DUB; 2; 6	ABU; 1 Ret	ABU; 2; 4			8th	26
2022	CD Sport	LMP3	Ligier JS P320	Nissan VK56DE 5.6 L V8	DUB; 1; 1	DUB; 2; 3	ABU; 1; 5	ABU; 2; 3			2nd	65
2023	CD Sport	LMP3	Ligier JS P320	Nissan VK56DE 5.6 L V8	DUB; 1; 3	DUB; 2; 9	ABU; 1; 8	ABU; 2; 7			6th	27
2023–24	CD Sport	LMP3	Ligier JS P320	Nissan VK56DE 5.6 L V8	SEP; 1; 2	SEP; 2; 1	DUB; 2	ABU; 1; 1	ABU; 2; 3		2nd	101
2024–25	Algarve Pro Racing	LMP2	Oreca 07	Gibson GK428 4.2 L V8	SEP; 1; 4	SEP; 2; 1	DUB; 1; 1	DUB; 2; 5	ABU; 1; 1	ABU; 2; 4	1st	109
2025–26	Algarve Pro Racing	LMP2	Oreca 07	Gibson GK428 4.2 L V8	SEP; 1; 2	SEP; 2; 2	DUB; 1; 5	DUB; 2; 2	ABU; 1; 5	ABU; 2 Ret	3rd	74

* Season still in progress.

=== Complete European Le Mans Series results ===
(key) (Races in bold indicate pole position; results in italics indicate fastest lap)

Year	Entrant	Class	Chassis	Engine	1	2	3	4	5	6	Rank	Points
2022	RLR MSport	LMP3	Ligier JS P320	Nissan VK56DE 5.6 L V8	LEC; 3	IMO; 4	MON; 4	CAT; 6	SPA; 9	ALG; 5	4th	59
2023	Team Virage	LMP3	Ligier JS P320	Nissan VK56DE 5.6 L V8	CAT; 8	LEC; 8	ARA; Ret	**SPA**; 5	**ALG**; Ret	POR; 5	11th	30
2024	RLR MSport	LMP3	Ligier JS P320	Nissan VK56DE 5.6 L V8	CAT; 4	**LEC**; 1	IMO; 4	**SPA**; 4	MUG; 2	ALG; 2	1st	99
2025	RLR MSport	LMP3	Ligier JS P325	Toyota V35A-FTS 3.5 L Turbo V6	CAT; 2	LEC; Ret	IMO; Ret	SPA; 2	SIL; 9	ALG; 5	8th	48
2026	Algarve Pro Racing	LMP2 Pro-Am	Oreca 07	Gibson GK428 4.2 L V8	CAT; 1	LEC; 11	IMO; 2	SPA; 2	SIL; 11	ALG; 1	1st	86

=== Complete 24 Hours of Le Mans results ===
Year	Team	Co-Drivers	Car	Class	Laps	Pos.	Class Pos.
2022	(Spain) CD Sport	(France) Christophe Cresp (France) Steven Palette	Ligier JS P217-Gibson	LMP2 Pro-Am	333	49th	9th
2025	(United Kingdom) RLR MSport	(Republic of Ireland) Ryan Cullen (France) Patrick Pilet	Oreca 07-Gibson	LMP2 Pro-Am	362	29th	7th
2026	(Portugal) Algarve Pro Racing	(United Kingdom) Jake Hughes (Italy) Enzo Trulli	Oreca 07-Gibson	LMP2 Pro-Am	356	26th	4th
