= 2022 4 Hours of Dubai =

Endurance sportscar racing event

The Grand Prix layout of the Dubai Autodrome

The 2022 4 Hours of Dubai was an endurance sportscar racing event held between 11 and 13 February 2022, as the first and second rounds of 2022 Asian Le Mans Series season.

== Schedule ==
Date	Time (local: GST)	Event
Friday, 11 February	13:50	Free Practice 1
Friday, 11 February	18:00	Free Practice 2
Saturday, 12 February	9:30	Qualifying - GT
Saturday, 12 February	10:15	Qualifying - LMP3
Saturday, 12 February	10:55	Qualifying - LMP2
Saturday, 12 February	16:30	Race 1
Sunday, 13 February	1:30	Race 2

== Free practice ==
- Only the fastest car in each class is shown.

Free Practice 1	Class	No.	Entrant	Time
Free Practice 1	LMP2	4	(United Kingdom) Nielsen Racing	1:46.925
Free Practice 1	LMP3	2	(Luxembourg) DKR Engineering	1:52.639
Free Practice 1	GT	57	(Switzerland) Kessel Racing	1:56.822
Free Practice 2	Class	No.	Entrant	Time
Free Practice 2	LMP2	39	(France) Graff	1:51.253
Free Practice 2	LMP3	26	(Russia) G-Drive Racing by Graff	1:52.965
Free Practice 2	GT	20	(Germany) SPS automotive performance	1:56.853

== Race 1 ==
=== Qualifying ===
Pole positions in each class are indicated in bold.

Pos.	Class	No.	Entry	Driver	Time	Grid
1	**LMP2**	**4**	**(United Kingdom) Nielsen Racing**	**(United Kingdom) Ben Hanley**	**1:45.248**	1
2	LMP2	39	(France) Graff	(Switzerland) David Droux	1:46.109	2
3	LMP2	49	(Denmark) High Class Racing	(Denmark) Dennis Andersen	1:49.949	3
4	LMP2	44	(Slovakia) ARC Bratislava	(Australia) Neale Muston	1:50.522	4
5	**LMP3**	**2**	**(Luxembourg) DKR Engineering**	**(Germany) Laurents Hörr**	**1:50.807**	5
6	LMP3	26	(Russia) G-Drive Racing	(Spain) Xavier Lloveras	1:52.025	6
7	LMP3	13	(Poland) Inter Europol Competition	(Portugal) Guilherme Oliveira	1:52.702	7
8	LMP3	3	(Spain) CD Sport	(France) Edouard Cauhaupé	1:52.808	8
9	LMP3	22	(Germany) Rinaldi Racing	(Germany) Hendrik Still	1:53.079	9
10	LMP3	21	(Austria) Konrad Motorsport	(South Africa) Jordan Grogor	1:53.588	10
11	LMP3	27	(Spain) CD Sport	(France) Steven Palette	1:53.692	11
12	LMP3	72	(Finland) Koiranen Kemppi Motorsport	(Finland) Jesse Salmenautio	1:54.967	12
13	**GT**	**7**	**(United Kingdom) Inception Racing with Optimum Motorsport**	**(United Kingdom) Ben Barnicoat**	**1:55.217**	14
14	GT	17	(Italy) AF Corse	(France) Vincent Abril	1:55.217	15
15	GT	57	(Switzerland) Kessel Racing	(Zimbabwe) Axcil Jefferies	1:55.233	16
16	GT	20	(Germany) SPS automotive performance	(Canada) Mikaël Grenier	1:55.338	17
17	GT	55	(Germany) Rinaldi Racing	(Italy) Davide Rigon	1:55.536	18
18	GT	69	Oman Racing Team with TF Sport	(Republic of Ireland) Charlie Eastwood	1:55.569	19
19	GT	77	(Japan) D'station Racing	(United Kingdom) Tom Gamble	1:55.595	20
20	GT	74	(Switzerland) Kessel Racing	(Denmark) Mikkel Jensen	1:55.719	—
21	GT	42	(United Kingdom) Inception Racing with Optimum Motorsport	(United Kingdom) Joe Osborne	1:55.794	21
22	GT	51	(Italy) AF Corse	(Italy) Alessandro Pier Guidi	1:55.806	22
23	GT	95	(United Kingdom) TF Sport	(United Kingdom) Jonathan Adam	1:55.838	23
24	GT	33	(Germany) Herberth Motorsport	(Austria) Klaus Bachler	1:55.860	24
25	GT	6	(Germany) Bilstein Haupt Racing Team	(India) Arjun Maini	1:55.930	25
26	GT	88	(United Kingdom) Garage 59	(Germany) Marvin Kirchhöfer	1:56.219	26
27	GT	99	(Germany) Herberth Motorsport	(Germany) Marco Seefried	1:56.223	27
28	GT	34	(Germany) Walkenhorst Motorsport	(Netherlands) Nicky Catsburg	1:56.236	28
29	GT	12	(Italy) Dinamic Motorsport	(United Kingdom) Ben Barker	1:56.351	29
30	GT	91	(Germany) Herberth Motorsport	(Germany) Robert Renauer	1:56.589	30
31	GT	59	(United Kingdom) Garage 59	(Denmark) Nicolai Kjærgaard	1:56.816	31
32	GT	96	(Germany) Attempto Racing	(Germany) Alex Aka	1:57.027	32
33	GT	66	(China) YC Panda Racing	(Canada) Bashar Mardini	1:59.041	33
34	GT	48	(United Arab Emirates) S’Aalocin by Kox Racing	(Netherlands) Peter Kox	2:05.113	34
35	GT	35	(Germany) Walkenhorst Motorsport	—		35
36	LMP3	8	(United Kingdom) Nielsen Racing	—		13

=== Race ===
==== Race result ====
The minimum number of laps for classification (70% of overall winning car's distance) was 86 laps. Class winners are marked in bold.

Pos	Class	No.	Team	Drivers	Car	Tyres	Laps	Time/Gap
1	**LMP2**	**4**	**(United Kingdom) Nielsen Racing**	**(United Kingdom) Matthew Bell** **(United Kingdom) Ben Hanley** **(United States) Rodrigo Sales**	**Oreca 07**	MI	**124**	**4:03:07.806**
2	LMP2	39	(France) Graff	(Switzerland) David Droux (Switzerland) Sébastien Page (France) Eric Trouillet	Oreca 07	MI	120	+4 Laps
3	LMP2	49	(Denmark) High Class Racing	(Denmark) Dennis Andersen (Denmark) Anders Fjordbach (United States) Kevin Weeda	Oreca 07	MI	120	+4 Laps
4	LMP2	44	(Slovakia) ARC Bratislava	(Australia) John Corbett (Slovakia) Miroslav Konôpka (Australia) Neale Muston	Ligier JS P217	MI	118	+6 Laps
5	**LMP3**	**3**	**(Spain) CD Sport**	**(United Kingdom) Nick Adcock** **(France) Edouard Cauhaupé** **(Denmark) Michael Jensen**	**Ligier JS P320**	MI	**118**	**+6 Laps**
6	LMP3	27	(Spain) CD Sport	(France) Christophe Cresp (France) Antoine Doquin (France) Steven Palette	Ligier JS P320	MI	117	+7 Laps
7	LMP3	26	(Russia) G-Drive Racing	(Russia) Vyaceslav Gutak (Spain) Xavier Lloveras (France) Fabrice Rossello	Ligier JS P320	MI	117	+7 Laps
8	LMP3	22	(Germany) Rinaldi Racing	(Germany) Torsten Kratz (Germany) Hendrik Still (Germany) Leonard Weiss	Duqueine M30 - D08	MI	117	+7 Laps
9	**GT**	**7**	**(United Kingdom) Inception Racing with Optimum Motorsport**	**(United Kingdom) Ben Barnicoat** **(United States) Brendan Iribe** **(United Kingdom) Ollie Millroy**	**McLaren 720S GT3**	MI	**117**	**+7 Laps**
10	GT	55	(Germany) Rinaldi Racing	(Italy) Rino Mastronardi (South Africa) David Perel (Italy) Davide Rigon	Ferrari 488 GT3 Evo 2020	MI	117	+7 Laps
11	GT	17	(Italy) AF Corse	(France) Vincent Abril (United States) Conrad Grunewald (Monaco) Louis Prette	Ferrari 488 GT3 Evo 2020	MI	117	+7 Laps
12	GT	42	(United Kingdom) Inception Racing with Optimum Motorsport	(United Kingdom) Nick Moss (United Kingdom) Joe Osborne (United Kingdom) Andrew Watson	McLaren 720S GT3	MI	117	+7 Laps
13	GT	88	(United Kingdom) Garage 59	(United Kingdom) Frank Bird (Germany) Marvin Kirchhöfer (Sweden) Alexander West	Aston Martin Vantage AMR GT3	MI	116	+8 Laps
14	GT	69	Oman Racing Team with TF Sport	(Republic of Ireland) Charlie Eastwood (Oman) Ahmad Al Harthy (United Kingdom) Sam De Haan	Aston Martin Vantage AMR GT3	MI	116	+8 Laps
15	GT	6	(Germany) Bilstein Haupt Racing Team	(Germany) Hubert Haupt (India) Arjun Maini (Finland) Rory Penttinen	Mercedes-AMG GT3 Evo	MI	116	+8 Laps
16	GT	91	(Germany) Precote Herberth Motorsport	(Germany) Ralf Bohn (Germany) Alfred Renauer (Germany) Robert Renauer	Porsche 911 GT3 R	MI	116	+8 Laps
17	GT	95	(United Kingdom) TF Sport	(United Kingdom) Jonathan Adam (Portugal) Henrique Chaves (United Kingdom) John Hartshorne	Aston Martin Vantage AMR GT3	MI	116	+8 Laps
18	GT	34	(Germany) Walkenhorst Motorsport	(Netherlands) Nicky Catsburg (United States) Chandler Hull (United States) Jon Miller	BMW M6 GT3	MI	116	+8 Laps
19	GT	20	(Germany) SPS automotive performance	(Canada) Mikaël Grenier (United Kingdom) Ian Loggie (Germany) Valentin Pierburg	Mercedes-AMG GT3 Evo	MI	116	+8 Laps
20	GT	33	(Germany) Precote Herberth Motorsport	(Hong Kong) Antares Au (Austria) Klaus Bachler (China) Yifei Ye	Porsche 911 GT3 R	MI	116	+8 Laps
21	GT	51	(Italy) AF Corse	(Italy) Alessandro Pier Guidi (Brazil) Oswaldo Negri Jr. (Puerto Rico) Francesco Piovanetti	Ferrari 488 GT3 Evo 2020	MI	115	+9 Laps
22	GT	12	(Italy) Dinamic Motorsport	(United Kingdom) Ben Barker (Italy) Giorgio Roda (Austria) Philipp Sager	Porsche 911 GT3 R	MI	115	+9 Laps
23	GT	96	(Germany) Attempto Racing	(Germany) Alex Aka (United Kingdom) Finlay Hutchison (Germany) Florian Scholze	Audi R8 LMS Evo	MI	115	+9 Laps
24	GT	57	(Switzerland) Kessel Racing	(Zimbabwe) Axcil Jefferies (Poland) Roman Ziemian (Italy) Francesco Zollo	Ferrari 488 GT3 Evo 2020	MI	115	+9 Laps
25	GT	77	(Japan) D'station Racing	(Japan) Tomonobu Fujii (United Kingdom) Tom Gamble (Japan) Satoshi Hoshino	Aston Martin Vantage AMR GT3	MI	115	+9 Laps
26	GT	99	(Germany) Herberth Motorsport	(Germany) Finn Gehrsitz (Germany) Jürgen Häring (Germany) Marco Seefried	Porsche 911 GT3 R	MI	114	+10 Laps
27	GT	59	(United Kingdom) Garage 59	(Denmark) Nicolai Kjærgaard (Venezuela) Manuel Maldonado (United Kingdom) James Vowles	Aston Martin Vantage AMR GT3	MI	114	+10 Laps
28	LMP3	13	(Poland) Inter Europol Competition	(Portugal) Guilherme Oliveira (Chile) Nico Pino (Russia) Alexander Bukhantsov	Ligier JS P320	MI	113	+11 Laps
29	GT	35	(Germany) Walkenhorst Motorsport	(Germany) Jörg Breuer (Germany) Mario Von Bohlen (Germany) Henry Walkenhorst	BMW M6 GT3	MI	111	+13 Laps
30	LMP3	72	(Finland) Koiranen Kemppi Motorsport	(Russia) Nikita Alexandrov (Finland) Jesse Salmenautio (Finland) Tomi Veijalainen	Duqueine M30 - D08	MI	111	+13 Laps
31	GT	66	(China) YC Panda Racing	(Malaysia) Douglas Khoo (Hong Kong) Edgar Lau (Canada) Bashar Mardini	Audi R8 LMS Evo	MI	108	+16 Laps
32	LMP3	8	(United Kingdom) Nielsen Racing	(United Kingdom) Colin Noble (United Kingdom) Anthony Wells	Ligier JS P320	MI	105	+19 Laps
33	LMP3	21	(Austria) Konrad Motorsport	(South Africa) Jordan Grogor (Hong Kong) Shaun Thong (Luxembourg) Gabriele Rindone	Ginetta G61-LT-P3	MI	92	+32 Laps
Not Classified
DNF	LMP3	2	(Luxembourg) DKR Engineering	(Mexico) Sebastián Álvarez (France) Mathieu de Barbuat (Germany) Laurents Hörr	Duqueine M30 – D08	MI	105	
DNF	GT	48	(United Arab Emirates) S’Aalocin by Kox Racing	(Netherlands) Peter Kox (Netherlands) Stéphane Kox (Netherlands) Nico Pronk	Porsche 911 GT3 R	MI	7	
DNS	GT	74	(Switzerland) Kessel Racing	(Poland) Michael Broniszewski (Italy) David Fumanelli (Denmark) Mikkel Jensen	Ferrari 488 GT3 Evo 2020	MI	0	

==== Statistics ====
===== Fastest lap =====
Class	Driver	Team	Time	Lap
LMP2	(United Kingdom) Matthew Bell	(United Kingdom) #4 Nielsen Racing	1:48.714	25
LMP3	(Spain) Xavier Lloveras	(Russia) #26 G-Drive Racing	1:55.173	93
GT	(United Kingdom) Ben Barnicoat	(United Kingdom) #7 Inception Racing with Optimum Motorsport	1:57.777	63

== Race 2 ==
=== Qualifying ===
Pole positions in each class are indicated in bold.

Pos.	Class	No.	Entry	Driver	Time	Grid
1	**LMP2**	**4**	**(United Kingdom) Nielsen Racing**	**(United Kingdom) Ben Hanley**	**1:46.075**	1
2	LMP2	39	(France) Graff	(Switzerland) David Droux	1:46.832	2
3	LMP2	44	(Slovakia) ARC Bratislava	(Australia) Neale Muston	1:49.688	3
4	LMP2	49	(Denmark) High Class Racing	(Denmark) Dennis Andersen	1:49.982	4
5	**LMP3**	**2**	**(Luxembourg) DKR Engineering**	**(Germany) Laurents Hörr**	**1:50.989**	5
6	LMP3	26	(Russia) G-Drive Racing	(Spain) Xavier Lloveras	1:51.831	6
7	LMP3	8	(United Kingdom) Nielsen Racing	(United Kingdom) Colin Noble	1:52.384	7
8	LMP3	13	(Poland) Inter Europol Competition	(Portugal) Guilherme Oliveira	1:52.452	8
9	LMP3	3	(Spain) CD Sport	(France) Edouard Cauhaupé	1:52.904	9
10	LMP3	22	(Germany) Rinaldi Racing	(Germany) Hendrik Still	1:52.941	10
11	LMP3	21	(Austria) Konrad Motorsport	(South Africa) Jordan Grogor	1:53.487	11
12	LMP3	27	(Spain) CD Sport	(France) Steven Palette	1:53.682	12
13	LMP3	72	(Finland) Koiranen Kemppi Motorsport	(Finland) Jesse Salmenautio	1:54.291	13
14	**GT**	**95**	**(United Kingdom) TF Sport**	**(United Kingdom) Jonathan Adam**	**1:55.883**	14
15	GT	74	(Switzerland) Kessel Racing	(Denmark) Mikkel Jensen	1:55.886	—
16	GT	7	(United Kingdom) Inception Racing with Optimum Motorsport	(United Kingdom) Ben Barnicoat	1:55.933	15
17	GT	17	(Italy) AF Corse	(France) Vincent Abril	1:55.949	16
18	GT	57	(Switzerland) Kessel Racing	(Zimbabwe) Axcil Jefferies	1:56.018	17
19	GT	51	(Italy) AF Corse	(Italy) Alessandro Pier Guidi	1:56.055	18
20	GT	55	(Germany) Rinaldi Racing	(Italy) Davide Rigon	1:56.118	19
21	GT	6	(Germany) Bilstein Haupt Racing Team	(India) Arjun Maini	1:56.131	20
22	GT	20	(Germany) SPS automotive performance	(Canada) Mikaël Grenier	1:56.147	21
23	GT	69	Oman Racing Team with TF Sport	(Republic of Ireland) Charlie Eastwood	1:56.321	22
24	GT	33	(Germany) Herberth Motorsport	(Austria) Klaus Bachler	1:56.362	23
25	GT	12	(Italy) Dinamic Motorsport	(United Kingdom) Ben Barker	1:56.553	24
26	GT	34	(Germany) Walkenhorst Motorsport	(Netherlands) Nicky Catsburg	1:56.648	25
27	GT	42	(United Kingdom) Inception Racing with Optimum Motorsport	(United Kingdom) Joe Osborne	1:56.657	26
28	GT	99	(Germany) Herberth Motorsport	(Germany) Marco Seefried	1:56.723	27
29	GT	77	(Japan) D'station Racing	(United Kingdom) Tom Gamble	1:56.725	28
30	GT	88	(United Kingdom) Garage 59	(Germany) Marvin Kirchhöfer	1:56.831	29
31	GT	59	(United Kingdom) Garage 59	(Denmark) Nicolai Kjærgaard	1:57.142	30
32	GT	91	(Germany) Herberth Motorsport	(Germany) Robert Renauer	1:57.245	31
33	GT	96	(Germany) Attempto Racing	(Germany) Alex Aka	1:57.681	32
34	GT	48	(United Arab Emirates) S’Aalocin by Kox Racing	(Netherlands) Peter Kox	1:58.651	33
35	GT	35	(Germany) Walkenhorst Motorsport	(Germany) Mario Von Bohlen	1:59.179	34
36	GT	66	(China) YC Panda Racing	(Canada) Bashar Mardini	2:01.253	35

=== Race ===
==== Race result ====
The minimum number of laps for classification (70% of overall winning car's distance) was 83 laps. Class winners are marked in bold.

Pos	Class	No.	Team	Drivers	Car	Tyres	Laps	Time/Gap
1	**LMP2**	**4**	**(United Kingdom) Nielsen Racing**	**(United Kingdom) Matthew Bell** **(United Kingdom) Ben Hanley** **(United States) Rodrigo Sales**	**Oreca 07**	MI	**119**	**4:02:00.179**
2	LMP2	49	(Denmark) High Class Racing	(Denmark) Dennis Andersen (Denmark) Anders Fjordbach (United States) Kevin Weeda	Oreca 07	MI	118	+1 Lap
3	LMP2	39	(France) Graff	(Switzerland) David Droux (Switzerland) Sébastien Page (France) Eric Trouillet	Oreca 07	MI	117	+2 Laps
4	LMP2	44	(Slovakia) ARC Bratislava	(Australia) John Corbett (Slovakia) Miroslav Konôpka (Australia) Neale Muston	Ligier JS P217	MI	116	+3 Laps
5	**LMP3**	**8**	**(United Kingdom) Nielsen Racing**	**(United Kingdom) Colin Noble** **(United Kingdom) Anthony Wells**	**Ligier JS P320**	MI	**115**	**+4 Laps**
6	LMP3	27	(Spain) CD Sport	(France) Christophe Cresp (France) Antoine Doquin (France) Steven Palette	Ligier JS P320	MI	115	+4 Laps
7	LMP3	3	(Spain) CD Sport	(United Kingdom) Nick Adcock (France) Edouard Cauhaupé (Denmark) Michael Jensen	Ligier JS P320	MI	114	+5 Laps
8	LMP3	22	(Germany) Rinaldi Racing	(Germany) Torsten Kratz (Germany) Hendrik Still (Germany) Leonard Weiss	Duqueine M30 - D08	MI	114	+5 Laps
9	**GT**	**55**	**(Germany) Rinaldi Racing**	**(Italy) Rino Mastronardi** **(South Africa) David Perel** **(Italy) Davide Rigon**	**Ferrari 488 GT3 Evo 2020**	MI	**114**	**+5 Laps**
10	GT	7	(United Kingdom) Inception Racing with Optimum Motorsport	(United Kingdom) Ben Barnicoat (United States) Brendan Iribe (United Kingdom) Ollie Millroy	McLaren 720S GT3	MI	114	+5 Laps
11	GT	17	(Italy) AF Corse	(France) Vincent Abril (United States) Conrad Grunewald (Monaco) Louis Prette	Ferrari 488 GT3 Evo 2020	MI	114	+5 Laps
12	GT	42	(United Kingdom) Inception Racing with Optimum Motorsport	(United Kingdom) Nick Moss (United Kingdom) Joe Osborne (United Kingdom) Andrew Watson	McLaren 720S GT3	MI	114	+5 Laps
13	LMP3	13	(Poland) Inter Europol Competition	(Portugal) Guilherme Oliveira (Chile) Nico Pino (Russia) Alexander Bukhantsov	Ligier JS P320	MI	114	+5 Laps
14	LMP3	26	(Russia) G-Drive Racing	(Russia) Vyaceslav Gutak (Spain) Xavier Lloveras (France) Fabrice Rossello	Ligier JS P320	MI	114	+5 Laps
15	GT	69	Oman Racing Team with TF Sport	(Republic of Ireland) Charlie Eastwood (Oman) Ahmad Al Harthy (United Kingdom) Sam De Haan	Aston Martin Vantage AMR GT3	MI	114	+5 Laps
16	GT	91	(Germany) Precote Herberth Motorsport	(Germany) Ralf Bohn (Germany) Alfred Renauer (Germany) Robert Renauer	Porsche 911 GT3 R	MI	113	+6 Laps
17	LMP3	2	(Luxembourg) DKR Engineering	(Mexico) Sebastián Álvarez (France) Mathieu de Barbuat (Germany) Laurents Hörr	Duqueine M30 – D08	MI	113	+6 Laps
18	GT	34	(Germany) Walkenhorst Motorsport	(Netherlands) Nicky Catsburg (United States) Chandler Hull (United States) Jon Miller	BMW M6 GT3	MI	113	+6 Laps
19	GT	88	(United Kingdom) Garage 59	(United Kingdom) Frank Bird (Germany) Marvin Kirchhöfer (Sweden) Alexander West	Aston Martin Vantage AMR GT3	MI	113	+6 Laps
20	GT	6	(Germany) Bilstein Haupt Racing Team	(Germany) Hubert Haupt (India) Arjun Maini (Finland) Rory Penttinen	Mercedes-AMG GT3 Evo	MI	113	+6 Laps
21	GT	77	(Japan) D'station Racing	(Japan) Tomonobu Fujii (United Kingdom) Tom Gamble (Japan) Satoshi Hoshino	Aston Martin Vantage AMR GT3	MI	113	+6 Laps
22	GT	95	(United Kingdom) TF Sport	(United Kingdom) Jonathan Adam (Portugal) Henrique Chaves (United Kingdom) John Hartshorne	Aston Martin Vantage AMR GT3	MI	113	+6 Laps
23	GT	20	(Germany) SPS automotive performance	(Canada) Mikaël Grenier (United Kingdom) Ian Loggie (Germany) Valentin Pierburg	Mercedes-AMG GT3 Evo	MI	113	+6 Laps
24	GT	12	(Italy) Dinamic Motorsport	(United Kingdom) Ben Barker (Italy) Giorgio Roda (Austria) Philipp Sager	Porsche 911 GT3 R	MI	112	+7 Laps
25	GT	59	(United Kingdom) Garage 59	(Denmark) Nicolai Kjærgaard (Venezuela) Manuel Maldonado (United Kingdom) James Vowles	Aston Martin Vantage AMR GT3	MI	112	+7 Laps
26	GT	96	(Germany) Attempto Racing	(Germany) Alex Aka (United Kingdom) Finlay Hutchison (Germany) Florian Scholze	Audi R8 LMS Evo	MI	112	+7 Laps
27	GT	57	(Switzerland) Kessel Racing	(Zimbabwe) Axcil Jefferies (Poland) Roman Ziemian (Italy) Francesco Zollo	Ferrari 488 GT3 Evo 2020	MI	112	+7 Laps
28	GT	99	(Germany) Herberth Motorsport	(Germany) Finn Gehrsitz (Germany) Jürgen Häring (Germany) Marco Seefried	Porsche 911 GT3 R	MI	112	+7 Laps
29	GT	51	(Italy) AF Corse	(Italy) Alessandro Pier Guidi (Brazil) Oswaldo Negri Jr. (Puerto Rico) Francesco Piovanetti	Ferrari 488 GT3 Evo 2020	MI	111	+8 Laps
30	GT	35	(Germany) Walkenhorst Motorsport	(Germany) Jörg Breuer (Germany) Mario Von Bohlen (Germany) Henry Walkenhorst	BMW M6 GT3	MI	110	+9 Laps
31	GT	48	(United Arab Emirates) S’Aalocin by Kox Racing	(Netherlands) Peter Kox (Netherlands) Stéphane Kox (Netherlands) Nico Pronk	Porsche 911 GT3 R	MI	108	+11 Laps
32	LMP3	72	(Finland) Koiranen Kemppi Motorsport	(Russia) Nikita Alexandrov (Finland) Jesse Salmenautio (Finland) Tomi Veijalainen	Duqueine M30 - D08	MI	112	+7 Laps
Not Classified
DNF	GT	66	(China) YC Panda Racing	(Malaysia) Douglas Khoo (Hong Kong) Edgar Lau (Canada) Bashar Mardini	Audi R8 LMS Evo	MI	80	
DNF	GT	33	(Germany) Precote Herberth Motorsport	(Hong Kong) Antares Au (Austria) Klaus Bachler (China) Yifei Ye	Porsche 911 GT3 R	MI	79	
DNF	LMP3	21	(Austria) Konrad Motorsport	(South Africa) Jordan Grogor (Hong Kong) Shaun Thong (Luxembourg) Gabriele Rindone	Ginetta G61-LT-P3	MI	36	
DNS	GT	74	(Switzerland) Kessel Racing	(Poland) Michael Broniszewski (Italy) David Fumanelli (Denmark) Mikkel Jensen	Ferrari 488 GT3 Evo 2020	MI	0	

==== Statistics ====
===== Fastest lap =====
Class	Driver	Team	Time	Lap
LMP2	(Denmark) Anders Fjordbach	(Denmark) #49 High Class Racing	1:47.612	76
LMP3	(Spain) Xavier Lloveras	(Russia) #26 G-Drive Racing	1:54.401	107
GT	(United Kingdom) Ben Barnicoat	(United Kingdom) #7 Inception Racing with Optimum Motorsport	1:56.358	61
