= 2022 Asian Le Mans Series =

Motorsport season

The 2022 Asian Le Mans Series was the tenth season of the Automobile Club de l'Ouest's Asian Le Mans Series. It is the fourth 24 Hours of Le Mans-based series created by the ACO, following the American Le Mans Series (since merged with the Rolex Sports Car Series to form the United SportsCar Championship), the European Le Mans Series and the FIA World Endurance Championship. The four-event season began at the Dubai Autodrome in Dubai on 11 February 2022 and ended at the Yas Marina Circuit in Abu Dhabi on 20 February 2022.

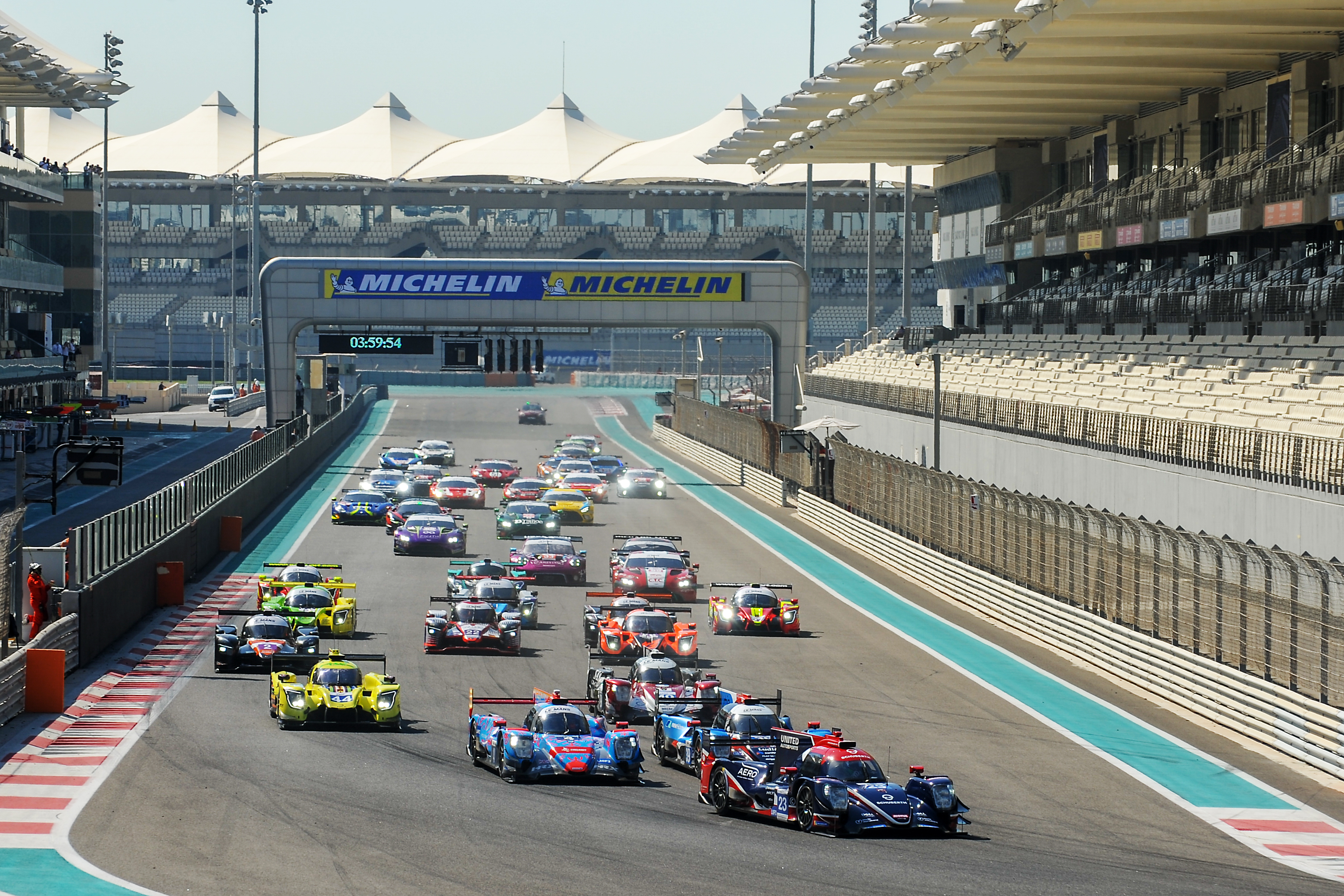
The start of the 4 Hours of Abu Dhabi 2022

== Calendar ==
The calendar for the 2022 season was announced on the official website 23 July 2021.

This Asian Le Mans Series season was once again run, in its entirety in the Middle East, in the United Arab Emirates at the Dubai Autodrome in Dubai and Yas Marina Circuit in Abu Dhabi in February 2022.

This season continued to comprise four four-hour length races. The races were run on the two circuits and combined night, day and twilight racing.

| Rnd | Race | Circuit | Location | Date |
|---|---|---|---|---|
| 1 | 4 Hours of Dubai | (United Arab Emirates) Dubai Autodrome | Dubailand, Dubai, UAE | 12 February 2022 |
| 2 | 4 Hours of Dubai | (United Arab Emirates) Dubai Autodrome | Dubailand, Dubai, UAE | 13 February 2022 |
| 3 | 4 Hours of Abu Dhabi | (United Arab Emirates) Yas Marina Circuit | Yas Island, Abu Dhabi, UAE | 19 February 2022 |
| 4 | 4 Hours of Abu Dhabi | (United Arab Emirates) Yas Marina Circuit | Yas Island, Abu Dhabi, UAE | 20 February 2022 |

== Entry list ==
=== LMP2 ===
| Entrant/Team | Car | Engine | Class | No. | Drivers | Rounds |
|---|---|---|---|---|---|---|
| (United Kingdom) Nielsen Racing | Oreca 07 | Gibson GK428 4.2 L V8 | P2 | 4 | (United Kingdom) Matt Bell | All |
| (United Kingdom) Nielsen Racing | Oreca 07 | Gibson GK428 4.2 L V8 | P2 | 4 | (United Kingdom) Ben Hanley | All |
| (United Kingdom) Nielsen Racing | Oreca 07 | Gibson GK428 4.2 L V8 | P2 | 4 | (United States) Rodrigo Sales | All |
| (United Kingdom) United Autosports (Note: United Autosports were deemed ineligible for points after opting to perform an in-season private test at the Yas Marina Circuit prior to the 4 Hours of Abu Dhabi. The championship standings therefore do not reflect their presence in the championship.) | Oreca 07 | Gibson GK428 4.2 L V8 | P2 | 23 | (United States) Josh Pierson | 3–4 |
| (United Kingdom) United Autosports | Oreca 07 | Gibson GK428 4.2 L V8 | P2 | 23 | (United Kingdom) Paul di Resta | 3–4 |
| (France) Graff | Oreca 07 | Gibson GK428 4.2 L V8 | Am | 39 | (Switzerland) David Droux | All |
| (France) Graff | Oreca 07 | Gibson GK428 4.2 L V8 | Am | 39 | (Switzerland) Sébastien Page | All |
| (France) Graff | Oreca 07 | Gibson GK428 4.2 L V8 | Am | 39 | (France) Eric Trouillet | All |
| (Slovakia) ARC Bratislava | Ligier JS P217 | Gibson GK428 4.2 L V8 | Am | 44 | (Australia) John Corbett | All |
| (Slovakia) ARC Bratislava | Ligier JS P217 | Gibson GK428 4.2 L V8 | Am | 44 | (Slovakia) Miro Konôpka | All |
| (Slovakia) ARC Bratislava | Ligier JS P217 | Gibson GK428 4.2 L V8 | Am | 44 | (Australia) Neale Muston | All |
| (Denmark) High Class Racing | Oreca 07 | Gibson GK428 4.2 L V8 | Am | 49 | (Denmark) Dennis Andersen | All |
| (Denmark) High Class Racing | Oreca 07 | Gibson GK428 4.2 L V8 | Am | 49 | (Denmark) Anders Fjordbach | All |
| (Denmark) High Class Racing | Oreca 07 | Gibson GK428 4.2 L V8 | Am | 49 | (United States) Kevin Weeda | All |

| Icon | Class |
|---|---|
| P2 | LMP2 |
| Am | LMP2 Am |

=== LMP3 ===
| Entrant/Team | Car | Engine | No. | Drivers | Rounds |
|---|---|---|---|---|---|
| (Luxembourg) DKR Engineering | Duqueine M30 - D08 | Nissan VK56DE 5.6 L V8 | 2 | (Mexico) Sebastián Álvarez | All |
| (Luxembourg) DKR Engineering | Duqueine M30 - D08 | Nissan VK56DE 5.6 L V8 | 2 | (France) Mathieu de Barbuat | All |
| (Luxembourg) DKR Engineering | Duqueine M30 - D08 | Nissan VK56DE 5.6 L V8 | 2 | (Germany) Laurents Hörr | All |
| (Spain) CD Sport | Ligier JS P320 | Nissan VK56DE 5.6 L V8 | 3 | (United Kingdom) Nick Adcock | All |
| (Spain) CD Sport | Ligier JS P320 | Nissan VK56DE 5.6 L V8 | 3 | (France) Edouard Cauhaupé | All |
| (Spain) CD Sport | Ligier JS P320 | Nissan VK56DE 5.6 L V8 | 3 | (Denmark) Michael Jensen | All |
| (Spain) CD Sport | Ligier JS P320 | Nissan VK56DE 5.6 L V8 | 27 | (France) Christophe Cresp | All |
| (Spain) CD Sport | Ligier JS P320 | Nissan VK56DE 5.6 L V8 | 27 | (France) Antoine Doquin | All |
| (Spain) CD Sport | Ligier JS P320 | Nissan VK56DE 5.6 L V8 | 27 | (France) Steven Palette | All |
| (United Kingdom) Nielsen Racing | Ligier JS P320 | Nissan VK56DE 5.6 L V8 | 8 | (United Kingdom) Colin Noble | All |
| (United Kingdom) Nielsen Racing | Ligier JS P320 | Nissan VK56DE 5.6 L V8 | 8 | (United Kingdom) Anthony Wells | All |
| (Poland) Inter Europol Competition | Ligier JS P320 | Nissan VK56DE 5.6 L V8 | 13 | (Portugal) Guilherme Oliveira | All |
| (Poland) Inter Europol Competition | Ligier JS P320 | Nissan VK56DE 5.6 L V8 | 13 | (Chile) Nico Pino | All |
| (Poland) Inter Europol Competition | Ligier JS P320 | Nissan VK56DE 5.6 L V8 | 13 | (United Arab Emirates) Alexander Bukhantsov | 1–2 |
| (Poland) Inter Europol Competition | Ligier JS P320 | Nissan VK56DE 5.6 L V8 | 13 | (Canada) James Dayson | 3–4 |
| (Austria) Konrad Motorsport | Ginetta G61-LT-P3 | Nissan VK56DE 5.6 L V8 | 21 | (South Africa) Jordan Grogor | All |
| (Austria) Konrad Motorsport | Ginetta G61-LT-P3 | Nissan VK56DE 5.6 L V8 | 21 | (Hong Kong) Shaun Thong | All |
| (Austria) Konrad Motorsport | Ginetta G61-LT-P3 | Nissan VK56DE 5.6 L V8 | 21 | (Luxembourg) Gabriele Rindone | All |
| (Germany) Rinaldi Racing | Duqueine M30 - D08 | Nissan VK56DE 5.6 L V8 | 22 | (Germany) Torsten Kratz | All |
| (Germany) Rinaldi Racing | Duqueine M30 - D08 | Nissan VK56DE 5.6 L V8 | 22 | (Germany) Hendrik Still | All |
| (Germany) Rinaldi Racing | Duqueine M30 - D08 | Nissan VK56DE 5.6 L V8 | 22 | (Germany) Leonard Weiss | All |
| (Russia) G-Drive Racing by Graff | Ligier JS P320 | Nissan VK56DE 5.6 L V8 | 26 | Vyaceslav Gutak | All |
| (Russia) G-Drive Racing by Graff | Ligier JS P320 | Nissan VK56DE 5.6 L V8 | 26 | (Spain) Xavier Lloveras | All |
| (Russia) G-Drive Racing by Graff | Ligier JS P320 | Nissan VK56DE 5.6 L V8 | 26 | (France) Fabrice Rossello | All |
| (Finland) Koiranen Kemppi Motorsport | Duqueine M30 - D08 | Nissan VK56DE 5.6 L V8 | 72 | Nikita Alexandrov | All |
| (Finland) Koiranen Kemppi Motorsport | Duqueine M30 - D08 | Nissan VK56DE 5.6 L V8 | 72 | (Finland) Jesse Salmenautio | All |
| (Finland) Koiranen Kemppi Motorsport | Duqueine M30 - D08 | Nissan VK56DE 5.6 L V8 | 72 | (Finland) Tomi Veijalainen | All |

=== GT ===
| Entrant/Team | Car | Engine | Class | No. | Drivers | Rounds |
|---|---|---|---|---|---|---|
| (Germany) Bilstein Haupt Racing Team | Mercedes-AMG GT3 Evo | Mercedes-AMG M159 6.2 L V8 | GT | 6 | (Germany) Hubert Haupt | All |
| (Germany) Bilstein Haupt Racing Team | Mercedes-AMG GT3 Evo | Mercedes-AMG M159 6.2 L V8 | GT | 6 | (India) Arjun Maini | All |
| (Germany) Bilstein Haupt Racing Team | Mercedes-AMG GT3 Evo | Mercedes-AMG M159 6.2 L V8 | GT | 6 | (Finland) Rory Penttinen | All |
| (United Kingdom) Inception Racing with Optimum Motorsport | McLaren 720S GT3 | McLaren M840T 4.0 L Turbo V8 | GT | 7 | (United Kingdom) Ben Barnicoat | All |
| (United Kingdom) Inception Racing with Optimum Motorsport | McLaren 720S GT3 | McLaren M840T 4.0 L Turbo V8 | GT | 7 | (United States) Brendan Iribe | All |
| (United Kingdom) Inception Racing with Optimum Motorsport | McLaren 720S GT3 | McLaren M840T 4.0 L Turbo V8 | GT | 7 | (United Kingdom) Ollie Millroy | All |
| (United Kingdom) Inception Racing with Optimum Motorsport | McLaren 720S GT3 | McLaren M840T 4.0 L Turbo V8 | GT | 42 | (United Kingdom) Nick Moss | All |
| (United Kingdom) Inception Racing with Optimum Motorsport | McLaren 720S GT3 | McLaren M840T 4.0 L Turbo V8 | GT | 42 | (United Kingdom) Joe Osborne | All |
| (United Kingdom) Inception Racing with Optimum Motorsport | McLaren 720S GT3 | McLaren M840T 4.0 L Turbo V8 | GT | 42 | (United Kingdom) Andrew Watson | All |
| (Italy) Dinamic Motorsport | Porsche 911 GT3 R | Porsche 4.0 L Flat-6 | GT | 12 | (United Kingdom) Ben Barker | All |
| (Italy) Dinamic Motorsport | Porsche 911 GT3 R | Porsche 4.0 L Flat-6 | GT | 12 | (Italy) Giorgio Roda | All |
| (Italy) Dinamic Motorsport | Porsche 911 GT3 R | Porsche 4.0 L Flat-6 | GT | 12 | (Austria) Philipp Sager | All |
| AF Corse/APM Monaco | Ferrari 488 GT3 Evo 2020 | Ferrari F154CB 3.9 L Turbo V8 | GT | 17 | (France) Vincent Abril | All |
| AF Corse/APM Monaco | Ferrari 488 GT3 Evo 2020 | Ferrari F154CB 3.9 L Turbo V8 | GT | 17 | (United States) Conrad Grunewald | All |
| AF Corse/APM Monaco | Ferrari 488 GT3 Evo 2020 | Ferrari F154CB 3.9 L Turbo V8 | GT | 17 | (Monaco) Louis Prette | All |
| (Italy) AF Corse | Ferrari 488 GT3 Evo 2020 | Ferrari F154CB 3.9 L Turbo V8 | GT | 51 | (Puerto Rico) Victor Gomez | All |
| (Italy) AF Corse | Ferrari 488 GT3 Evo 2020 | Ferrari F154CB 3.9 L Turbo V8 | GT | 51 | (Italy) Alessandro Pier Guidi | All |
| (Italy) AF Corse | Ferrari 488 GT3 Evo 2020 | Ferrari F154CB 3.9 L Turbo V8 | GT | 51 | (Puerto Rico) Francesco Piovanetti | All |
| (Germany) SPS automotive performance | Mercedes-AMG GT3 Evo | Mercedes-AMG M159 6.2 L V8 | Am | 20 | (Canada) Mikaël Grenier | All |
| (Germany) SPS automotive performance | Mercedes-AMG GT3 Evo | Mercedes-AMG M159 6.2 L V8 | Am | 20 | (United Kingdom) Ian Loggie | All |
| (Germany) SPS automotive performance | Mercedes-AMG GT3 Evo | Mercedes-AMG M159 6.2 L V8 | Am | 20 | (Germany) Valentin Pierburg | All |
| (Germany) Herberth Motorsport | Porsche 911 GT3 R | Porsche 4.0 L Flat-6 | GT | 33 | (Hong Kong) Antares Au | All |
| (Germany) Herberth Motorsport | Porsche 911 GT3 R | Porsche 4.0 L Flat-6 | GT | 33 | (Austria) Klaus Bachler | All |
| (Germany) Herberth Motorsport | Porsche 911 GT3 R | Porsche 4.0 L Flat-6 | GT | 33 | (China) Yifei Ye | All |
| (Germany) Herberth Motorsport | Porsche 911 GT3 R | Porsche 4.0 L Flat-6 | GT | 91 | (Germany) Ralf Bohn | All |
| (Germany) Herberth Motorsport | Porsche 911 GT3 R | Porsche 4.0 L Flat-6 | GT | 91 | (Germany) Alfred Renauer | All |
| (Germany) Herberth Motorsport | Porsche 911 GT3 R | Porsche 4.0 L Flat-6 | GT | 91 | (Germany) Robert Renauer | All |
| (Germany) Herberth Motorsport | Porsche 911 GT3 R | Porsche 4.0 L Flat-6 | Am | 99 | (Germany) Finn Gehrsitz | All |
| (Germany) Herberth Motorsport | Porsche 911 GT3 R | Porsche 4.0 L Flat-6 | Am | 99 | (Germany) Jürgen Häring | All |
| (Germany) Herberth Motorsport | Porsche 911 GT3 R | Porsche 4.0 L Flat-6 | Am | 99 | (Germany) Marco Seefried | All |
| (Germany) Walkenhorst Motorsport | BMW M4 GT3 | BMW S58B30T0 3.0 L Turbo I6 | GT | 34 | (Netherlands) Nicky Catsburg | All |
| (Germany) Walkenhorst Motorsport | BMW M4 GT3 | BMW S58B30T0 3.0 L Turbo I6 | GT | 34 | (United States) Chandler Hull | All |
| (Germany) Walkenhorst Motorsport | BMW M4 GT3 | BMW S58B30T0 3.0 L Turbo I6 | GT | 34 | (United States) Jon Miller | All |
| (Germany) Walkenhorst Motorsport | BMW M4 GT3 | BMW S58B30T0 3.0 L Turbo I6 | Am | 35 | (Germany) Jörg Breuer | All |
| (Germany) Walkenhorst Motorsport | BMW M4 GT3 | BMW S58B30T0 3.0 L Turbo I6 | Am | 35 | (Germany) Henry Walkenhorst | All |
| (Germany) Walkenhorst Motorsport | BMW M4 GT3 | BMW S58B30T0 3.0 L Turbo I6 | Am | 35 | (Germany) Mario Von Bohlen | 1–2 |
| (Germany) Walkenhorst Motorsport | BMW M4 GT3 | BMW S58B30T0 3.0 L Turbo I6 | Am | 35 | (Germany) Friedrich Von Bohlen | 3–4 |
| (United Arab Emirates) S’Aalocin by Kox Racing | Porsche 911 GT3 R | Porsche 4.0 L Flat-6 | GT | 48 | (Netherlands) Peter Kox | All |
| (United Arab Emirates) S’Aalocin by Kox Racing | Porsche 911 GT3 R | Porsche 4.0 L Flat-6 | GT | 48 | (Netherlands) Stéphane Kox | All |
| (United Arab Emirates) S’Aalocin by Kox Racing | Porsche 911 GT3 R | Porsche 4.0 L Flat-6 | GT | 48 | (Netherlands) Nico Pronk | All |
| (Germany) Rinaldi Racing | Ferrari 488 GT3 Evo 2020 | Ferrari F154CB 3.9 L Turbo V8 | GT | 55 | (Italy) Rino Mastronardi | All |
| (Germany) Rinaldi Racing | Ferrari 488 GT3 Evo 2020 | Ferrari F154CB 3.9 L Turbo V8 | GT | 55 | (South Africa) David Perel | All |
| (Germany) Rinaldi Racing | Ferrari 488 GT3 Evo 2020 | Ferrari F154CB 3.9 L Turbo V8 | GT | 55 | (Italy) Davide Rigon | All |
| (Switzerland) Kessel Racing | Ferrari 488 GT3 Evo 2020 | Ferrari F154CB 3.9 L Turbo V8 | Am | 57 | (Zimbabwe) Axcil Jefferies | All |
| (Switzerland) Kessel Racing | Ferrari 488 GT3 Evo 2020 | Ferrari F154CB 3.9 L Turbo V8 | Am | 57 | (Poland) Roman Ziemian | All |
| (Switzerland) Kessel Racing | Ferrari 488 GT3 Evo 2020 | Ferrari F154CB 3.9 L Turbo V8 | Am | 57 | (Italy) Francesco Zollo | All |
| (Switzerland) Kessel Racing | Ferrari 488 GT3 Evo 2020 | Ferrari F154CB 3.9 L Turbo V8 | GT | 74 | (Poland) Michał Broniszewski | 3–4 |
| (Switzerland) Kessel Racing | Ferrari 488 GT3 Evo 2020 | Ferrari F154CB 3.9 L Turbo V8 | GT | 74 | (Italy) David Fumanelli | 3–4 |
| (Switzerland) Kessel Racing | Ferrari 488 GT3 Evo 2020 | Ferrari F154CB 3.9 L Turbo V8 | GT | 74 | (Denmark) Mikkel Jensen | 3–4 |
| (United Kingdom) Garage 59 | McLaren 720S GT3 | McLaren M840T 4.0 L Turbo V8 | GT | 59 | (Denmark) Nicolai Kjærgaard | All |
| (United Kingdom) Garage 59 | McLaren 720S GT3 | McLaren M840T 4.0 L Turbo V8 | GT | 59 | (Venezuela) Manuel Maldonado | All |
| (United Kingdom) Garage 59 | McLaren 720S GT3 | McLaren M840T 4.0 L Turbo V8 | GT | 59 | (United Kingdom) James Vowles | All |
| (United Kingdom) Garage 59 | McLaren 720S GT3 | McLaren M840T 4.0 L Turbo V8 | GT | 88 | (United Kingdom) Frank Bird | All |
| (United Kingdom) Garage 59 | McLaren 720S GT3 | McLaren M840T 4.0 L Turbo V8 | GT | 88 | (Germany) Marvin Kirchhöfer | All |
| (United Kingdom) Garage 59 | McLaren 720S GT3 | McLaren M840T 4.0 L Turbo V8 | GT | 88 | (Sweden) Alexander West | All |
| (China) YC Panda Racing | Audi R8 LMS Evo | Audi DAR 5.2 L V10 | Am | 66 | (Malaysia) Douglas Khoo | All |
| (China) YC Panda Racing | Audi R8 LMS Evo | Audi DAR 5.2 L V10 | Am | 66 | (Hong Kong) Edgar Lau | 1–2 |
| (China) YC Panda Racing | Audi R8 LMS Evo | Audi DAR 5.2 L V10 | Am | 66 | (Canada) Bashar Mardini | 1–2 |
| (China) YC Panda Racing | Audi R8 LMS Evo | Audi DAR 5.2 L V10 | Am | 66 | (United States) Jean-Francois Brunot | 3–4 |
| Oman Racing Team with TF Sport | Aston Martin Vantage AMR GT3 | Aston Martin 4.0 L Turbo V8 | GT | 69 | (Oman) Ahmad Al Harthy | All |
| Oman Racing Team with TF Sport | Aston Martin Vantage AMR GT3 | Aston Martin 4.0 L Turbo V8 | GT | 69 | (Republic of Ireland) Charlie Eastwood | All |
| Oman Racing Team with TF Sport | Aston Martin Vantage AMR GT3 | Aston Martin 4.0 L Turbo V8 | GT | 69 | (United Kingdom) Sam De Haan | All |
| (United Kingdom) TF Sport | Aston Martin Vantage AMR GT3 | Aston Martin 4.0 L Turbo V8 | GT | 95 | (United Kingdom) Jonathan Adam | All |
| (United Kingdom) TF Sport | Aston Martin Vantage AMR GT3 | Aston Martin 4.0 L Turbo V8 | GT | 95 | (Portugal) Henrique Chaves | All |
| (United Kingdom) TF Sport | Aston Martin Vantage AMR GT3 | Aston Martin 4.0 L Turbo V8 | GT | 95 | (United Kingdom) John Hartshorne | All |
| (Japan) D'station Racing | Aston Martin Vantage AMR GT3 | Aston Martin 4.0 L Turbo V8 | GT | 77 | (Japan) Tomonobu Fujii | All |
| (Japan) D'station Racing | Aston Martin Vantage AMR GT3 | Aston Martin 4.0 L Turbo V8 | GT | 77 | (United Kingdom) Tom Gamble | All |
| (Japan) D'station Racing | Aston Martin Vantage AMR GT3 | Aston Martin 4.0 L Turbo V8 | GT | 77 | (Japan) Satoshi Hoshino | All |
| (Germany) Attempto Racing | Audi R8 LMS Evo | Audi DAR 5.2 L V10 | GT | 96 | (Germany) Alex Aka | All |
| (Germany) Attempto Racing | Audi R8 LMS Evo | Audi DAR 5.2 L V10 | GT | 96 | (United Kingdom) Finlay Hutchison | All |
| (Germany) Attempto Racing | Audi R8 LMS Evo | Audi DAR 5.2 L V10 | GT | 96 | (Germany) Florian Scholze | All |

| Icon | Class |
|---|---|
| GT | GT3 |
| Am | GT3 Am |

== Results ==
Bold indicates overall winner.

| Round | Circuit | LMP2 Winning Team | LMP2 Am Winning Team | LMP3 Winning Team | GT Winning Team | GT Am Winning Team | Ref. |
| Round | Circuit | LMP2 Winning Drivers | LMP2 Am Winning Drivers | LMP3 Winning Drivers | GT Winning Drivers | GT Am Winning Drivers | Ref. |
|---|---|---|---|---|---|---|---|
| 1 | (United Arab Emirates) Dubai | **(United Kingdom) #4 Nielsen Racing** | (France) #39 Graff | (Spain) #3 CD Sport | (United Kingdom) #7 Inception Racing with Optimum Motorsport | (Switzerland) #57 Kessel Racing | Report |
| 1 | (United Arab Emirates) Dubai | **(United Kingdom) Matt Bell** **(United Kingdom) Ben Hanley** **(United States) Rodrigo Sales** | (Switzerland) David Droux (Switzerland) Sébastien Page (France) Eric Trouillet | (United Kingdom) Nick Adcock (France) Edouard Cauhaupé (Denmark) Michael Jensen | (United Kingdom) Ben Barnicoat (United States) Brendan Iribe (United Kingdom) Ollie Millroy | (Zimbabwe) Axcil Jefferies (Poland) Roman Ziemian (Italy) Francesco Zollo | Report |
| 2 | (United Arab Emirates) Dubai | **(United Kingdom) #4 Nielsen Racing** | (Denmark) #49 High Class Racing | (United Kingdom) #8 Nielsen Racing | (Germany) #55 Rinaldi Racing | (Switzerland) #57 Kessel Racing | Report |
| 2 | (United Arab Emirates) Dubai | **(United Kingdom) Matt Bell** **(United Kingdom) Ben Hanley** **(United States) Rodrigo Sales** | (Denmark) Dennis Andersen (Denmark) Anders Fjordbach (United States) Kevin Weeda | (United Kingdom) Colin Noble (United Kingdom) Anthony Wells | (Italy) Rino Mastronardi (South Africa) David Perel (Italy) Davide Rigon | (Zimbabwe) Axcil Jefferies (Poland) Roman Ziemian (Italy) Francesco Zollo | Report |
| 3 | (United Arab Emirates) Abu Dhabi | **(United Kingdom) #23 United Autosports** | (France) #39 Graff | (Luxembourg) #2 DKR Engineering | (Germany) #91 Herberth Motorsport | (Switzerland) #57 Kessel Racing | Report |
| 3 | (United Arab Emirates) Abu Dhabi | **(United States) Josh Pierson** **(United Kingdom) Paul Di Resta** | (Switzerland) David Droux (Switzerland) Sébastien Page (France) Eric Trouillet | (Mexico) Sebastián Álvarez Acre (France) Mathieu de Barbuat (Germany) Laurents Hörr | (Germany) Ralf Bohn (Germany) Alfred Renauer (Germany) Robert Renauer | (Zimbabwe) Axcil Jefferies (Poland) Roman Ziemian (Italy) Francesco Zollo | Report |
| 4 | (United Arab Emirates) Abu Dhabi | **(United Kingdom) #23 United Autosports** | (France) #39 Graff | (Russia) #26 G-Drive Racing by Graff | (Germany) #91 Herberth Motorsport | (Switzerland) #57 Kessel Racing | Report |
| 4 | (United Arab Emirates) Abu Dhabi | **(United States) Josh Pierson** **(United Kingdom) Paul Di Resta** | (Switzerland) David Droux (Switzerland) Sébastien Page (France) Eric Trouillet | (Russia) Vyaceslav Gutak (Spain) Xavier Lloveras (France) Fabrice Rossello | (Germany) Ralf Bohn (Germany) Alfred Renauer (Germany) Robert Renauer | (Zimbabwe) Axcil Jefferies (Poland) Roman Ziemian (Italy) Francesco Zollo | Report |

== Teams' Championships ==
Points are awarded according to the following structure:

| Position | **1st** | **2nd** | **3rd** | **4th** | **5th** | **6th** | **7th** | **8th** | **9th** | **10th** | **Other** | **Pole** |
| Points | 25 | 18 | 15 | 12 | 10 | 8 | 6 | 4 | 2 | 1 | 0.5 | 1 |

=== LMP2 Teams Championship ===
| Pos. | Team | Car | DUB (United Arab Emirates) | | ABU (United Arab Emirates) | | Points |
|---|---|---|---|---|---|---|---|
| 1 | (United Kingdom) #4 Nielsen Racing | Oreca 07 | **1** | **1** | 2 | 2 | 104 |
| 2 | (France) #39 Graff | Oreca 07 | 2 | 3 | 3 | 3 | 69 |
| 3 | (Denmark) #49 High Class Racing | Oreca 07 | 3 | 2 | 4 | 5 | 60 |
| 4 | (Slovakia) #44 ARC Bratislava | Ligier JS P217 | 4 | 4 | 5 | 4 | 51 |
Teams ineligible for points
| | (United Kingdom) #23 United Autosports | Oreca 07 | | | **1** | **1** | |

Key
| Colour | Result |
|---|---|
| Gold | Race winner |
| Silver | 2nd place |
| Bronze | 3rd place |
| Green | Points finish |
| Blue | Non-points finish |
| Blue | Non-classified finish (NC) |
| Purple | Did not finish (Ret) |
| Black | Disqualified (DSQ) |
| Black | Excluded (EX) |
| White | Did not start (DNS) |
| White | Race cancelled (C) |
| White | Withdrew (WD) |
| Blank | Did not participate |

**Bold** – Pole

=== LMP2 Am Teams Championship ===
| Pos. | Team | Car | DUB (United Arab Emirates) | | ABU (United Arab Emirates) | | Points |
|---|---|---|---|---|---|---|---|
| 1 | (France) #39 Graff | Oreca 07 | 1 | 2 | 1 | 1 | 93 |
| 2 | (Denmark) #49 High Class Racing | Oreca 07 | 2 | 1 | 2 | 3 | 76 |
| 3 | (Slovakia) #44 ARC Bratislava | Ligier JS P217 | 3 | 3 | 3 | 2 | 63 |

Key
| Colour | Result |
|---|---|
| Gold | Race winner |
| Silver | 2nd place |
| Bronze | 3rd place |
| Green | Points finish |
| Blue | Non-points finish |
| Blue | Non-classified finish (NC) |
| Purple | Did not finish (Ret) |
| Black | Disqualified (DSQ) |
| Black | Excluded (EX) |
| White | Did not start (DNS) |
| White | Race cancelled (C) |
| White | Withdrew (WD) |
| Blank | Did not participate |

=== LMP3 Teams Championship ===
| Pos. | Team | Car | DUB (United Arab Emirates) | | ABU (United Arab Emirates) | | Points |
|---|---|---|---|---|---|---|---|
| 1 | (Spain) #27 CD Sport | Ligier JS P320 | 2 | 2 | 3 | 2 | 69 |
| 2 | (Spain) #3 CD Sport | Ligier JS P320 | 1 | 3 | 5 | 3 | 65 |
| 3 | (Germany) #22 Wochenspiegel Team Monschau | Duqueine M30 - D08 | 4 | 4 | 2 | 4 | 54 |
| 4 | (United Kingdom) #8 Nielsen Racing | Ligier JS P320 | 7 | 1 | 4 | 6 | 51 |
| 5 | (Russia) #26 G-Drive Racing by Graff | Ligier JS P320 | 3 | 6 | Ret | 1 | 48 |
| 6 | (Luxembourg) #2 DKR Engineering | Duqueine M30 - D08 | **Ret** | **7** | **1** | **7** | 41 |
| 7 | (Poland) #13 Inter Europol Competition | Ligier JS P320 | 5 | 5 | 6 | 5 | 38 |
| 8 | (Finland) #72 Koiranen Kemppi Motorsport | Duqueine M30 - D08 | 6 | 8 | 8 | Ret | 16 |
| 9 | (Austria) #21 Konrad Motorsport | Ginetta G61-LT-P3 | 8 | Ret | 7 | Ret | 10 |

Key
| Colour | Result |
|---|---|
| Gold | Race winner |
| Silver | 2nd place |
| Bronze | 3rd place |
| Green | Points finish |
| Blue | Non-points finish |
| Blue | Non-classified finish (NC) |
| Purple | Did not finish (Ret) |
| Black | Disqualified (DSQ) |
| Black | Excluded (EX) |
| White | Did not start (DNS) |
| White | Race cancelled (C) |
| White | Withdrew (WD) |
| Blank | Did not participate |

**Bold** – Pole

=== GT Teams Championship ===
| Pos. | Team | Car | DUB (United Arab Emirates) | | ABU (United Arab Emirates) | | Points |
|---|---|---|---|---|---|---|---|
| 1 | (United Kingdom) #7 Inception Racing with Optimum Motorsport | McLaren 720S GT3 | **1** | 2 | 2 | 5 | 72 |
| 2 | (Germany) #91 Herberth Motorsport | Porsche 911 GT3 R | 8 | 6 | 1 | 1 | 62 |
| 3 | (Germany) #55 Rinaldi Racing | Ferrari 488 GT3 Evo 2020 | 2 | 1 | 7 | 6 | 57 |
| 4 | #17 AF Corse/APM Monaco | Ferrari 488 GT3 Evo 2020 | 3 | 3 | 3 | Ret | 45 |
| 5 | #69 Oman Racing Team with TF Sport | Aston Martin Vantage AMR GT3 | 6 | 5 | 5 | 4 | 40 |
| 6 | (United Kingdom) #42 Inception Racing with Optimum Motorsport | McLaren 720S GT3 | 4 | 4 | 4 | 9 | 38 |
| 7 | (United Kingdom) #88 Garage 59 | McLaren 720S GT3 | 5 | 8 | 14 | 3 | 29.5 |
| 8 | (Germany) #33 Herberth Motorsport | Porsche 911 GT3 R | 12 | Ret | 17 | **2** | 20 |
| 9 | (Germany) #6 Bilstein Haupt Racing Team | Mercedes-AMG GT3 Evo | 7 | 9 | 9 | 7 | 16 |
| 10 | (United Kingdom) #95 TF Sport | Aston Martin Vantage AMR GT3 | 9 | **11** | **6** | 11 | 13 |
| 11 | (Germany) #34 Walkenhorst Motorsport | BMW M4 GT3 | 10 | 7 | 11 | 12 | 8 |
| 12 | (Japan) #77 D'station Racing | Aston Martin Vantage AMR GT3 | 17 | 10 | 8 | Ret | 5.5 |
| 13 | (Italy) #12 Dinamic Motorsport | Porsche 911 GT3 R | 14 | 13 | 12 | 8 | 5.5 |
| 14 | (Switzerland) #74 Kessel Racing | Ferrari 488 GT3 Evo 2020 | DNS | DNS | 10 | 10 | 2 |
| 15 | (Germany) #20 SPS automotive performance | Mercedes-AMG GT3 Evo | 11 | 12 | 16 | 16 | 2 |
| 16 | (Italy) #51 AF Corse | Ferrari 488 GT3 Evo 2020 | 13 | 18 | 18 | 13 | 2 |
| 17 | (United Kingdom) #59 Garage 59 | McLaren 720S GT3 | 19 | 14 | 13 | 19 | 2 |
| 18 | (Germany) #96 Attempto Racing | Audi R8 LMS Evo | 15 | 15 | 19 | 14 | 2 |
| 19 | (Switzerland) #57 Kessel Racing | Ferrari 488 GT3 Evo 2020 | 16 | 16 | 15 | 15 | 2 |
| 20 | (Germany) #99 Herberth Motorsport | Porsche 911 GT3 R | 18 | 17 | 20 | 17 | 2 |
| 21 | (Germany) #35 Walkenhorst Motorsport | BMW M4 GT3 | 20 | 19 | 22 | 20 | 2 |
| 22 | (United Arab Emirates) #48 S’Aalocin by Kox Racing | Porsche 911 GT3 R | Ret | 20 | 21 | 18 | 1.5 |
| 23 | (China) #66 YC Panda Racing | Audi R8 LMS Evo | 21 | Ret | NC | 21 | 1 |

Key
| Colour | Result |
|---|---|
| Gold | Race winner |
| Silver | 2nd place |
| Bronze | 3rd place |
| Green | Points finish |
| Blue | Non-points finish |
| Blue | Non-classified finish (NC) |
| Purple | Did not finish (Ret) |
| Black | Disqualified (DSQ) |
| Black | Excluded (EX) |
| White | Did not start (DNS) |
| White | Race cancelled (C) |
| White | Withdrew (WD) |
| Blank | Did not participate |

**Bold** – Pole

=== GT Am Teams Championship ===
| Pos. | Team | Car | DUB (United Arab Emirates) | | ABU (United Arab Emirates) | | Points |
|---|---|---|---|---|---|---|---|
| 1 | (Germany) #20 SPS automotive performance | Mercedes-AMG GT3 Evo | 1 | 1 | 2 | 2 | 86 |
| 2 | (Switzerland) #57 Kessel Racing | Ferrari 488 GT3 Evo 2020 | 2 | 2 | 1 | 1 | 86 |
| 3 | (Germany) #99 Herberth Motorsport | Porsche 911 GT3 R | 3 | 3 | 3 | 3 | 60 |
| 4 | (Germany) #35 Walkenhorst Motorsport | BMW M4 GT3 | 4 | 4 | 4 | 4 | 48 |
| 5 | (China) #66 YC Panda Racing | Audi R8 LMS Evo | 5 | Ret | NC | 5 | 20 |

Key
| Colour | Result |
|---|---|
| Gold | Race winner |
| Silver | 2nd place |
| Bronze | 3rd place |
| Green | Points finish |
| Blue | Non-points finish |
| Blue | Non-classified finish (NC) |
| Purple | Did not finish (Ret) |
| Black | Disqualified (DSQ) |
| Black | Excluded (EX) |
| White | Did not start (DNS) |
| White | Race cancelled (C) |
| White | Withdrew (WD) |
| Blank | Did not participate |

**Bold** – Pole

== Drivers' championships ==
Points are awarded according to the following structure:

| Position | **1st** | **2nd** | **3rd** | **4th** | **5th** | **6th** | **7th** | **8th** | **9th** | **10th** | **Other** | **Pole** |
| Points | 25 | 18 | 15 | 12 | 10 | 8 | 6 | 4 | 2 | 1 | 0.5 | 1 |

=== LMP2 Drivers Championship ===
| Pos. | Drivers | Car | DUB (United Arab Emirates) | | ABU (United Arab Emirates) | | Points |
|---|---|---|---|---|---|---|---|
| 1 | (United Kingdom) Matt Bell | Oreca 07 | **1** | **1** | 2 | 2 | 104 |
| 1 | (United Kingdom) Ben Hanley | Oreca 07 | **1** | **1** | 2 | 2 | 104 |
| 1 | (United States) Rodrigo Sales | Oreca 07 | **1** | **1** | 2 | 2 | 104 |
| 2 | (Switzerland) David Droux | Oreca 07 | 2 | 3 | 3 | 3 | 69 |
| 2 | (Switzerland) Sébastien Page | Oreca 07 | 2 | 3 | 3 | 3 | 69 |
| 2 | (France) Eric Trouillet | Oreca 07 | 2 | 3 | 3 | 3 | 69 |
| 3 | (Denmark) Dennis Andersen | Oreca 07 | 3 | 2 | 4 | 5 | 60 |
| 3 | (Denmark) Anders Fjordbach | Oreca 07 | 3 | 2 | 4 | 5 | 60 |
| 3 | (United States) Kevin Weeda | Oreca 07 | 3 | 2 | 4 | 5 | 60 |
| 4 | (Australia) John Corbett | Ligier JS P217 | 4 | 4 | 5 | 4 | 51 |
| 4 | (Slovakia) Miro Konôpka | Ligier JS P217 | 4 | 4 | 5 | 4 | 51 |
| 4 | (Australia) Neale Muston | Ligier JS P217 | 4 | 4 | 5 | 4 | 51 |
Drivers ineligible for points
| | (United States) Josh Pierson | Oreca 07 | | | **1** | **1** | |
| | (United Kingdom) Paul di Resta | Oreca 07 | | | **1** | **1** | |

Key
| Colour | Result |
|---|---|
| Gold | Race winner |
| Silver | 2nd place |
| Bronze | 3rd place |
| Green | Points finish |
| Blue | Non-points finish |
| Blue | Non-classified finish (NC) |
| Purple | Did not finish (Ret) |
| Black | Disqualified (DSQ) |
| Black | Excluded (EX) |
| White | Did not start (DNS) |
| White | Race cancelled (C) |
| White | Withdrew (WD) |
| Blank | Did not participate |

**Bold** – Pole

=== LMP2 Am Drivers Championship ===
| Pos. | Drivers | Car | DUB (United Arab Emirates) | | ABU (United Arab Emirates) | | Points |
|---|---|---|---|---|---|---|---|
| 1 | (Switzerland) David Droux | Oreca 07 | 1 | 2 | 1 | 1 | 93 |
| 1 | (Switzerland) Sébastien Page | Oreca 07 | 1 | 2 | 1 | 1 | 93 |
| 1 | (France) Eric Trouillet | Oreca 07 | 1 | 2 | 1 | 1 | 93 |
| 2 | (Denmark) Dennis Andersen | Oreca 07 | 2 | 1 | 2 | 3 | 76 |
| 2 | (Denmark) Anders Fjordbach | Oreca 07 | 2 | 1 | 2 | 3 | 76 |
| 2 | (United States) Kevin Weeda | Oreca 07 | 2 | 1 | 2 | 3 | 76 |
| 3 | (Australia) John Corbett | Ligier JS P217 | 3 | 3 | 3 | 2 | 63 |
| 3 | (Slovakia) Miro Konôpka | Ligier JS P217 | 3 | 3 | 3 | 2 | 63 |
| 3 | (Australia) Neale Muston | Ligier JS P217 | 3 | 3 | 3 | 2 | 63 |

Key
| Colour | Result |
|---|---|
| Gold | Race winner |
| Silver | 2nd place |
| Bronze | 3rd place |
| Green | Points finish |
| Blue | Non-points finish |
| Blue | Non-classified finish (NC) |
| Purple | Did not finish (Ret) |
| Black | Disqualified (DSQ) |
| Black | Excluded (EX) |
| White | Did not start (DNS) |
| White | Race cancelled (C) |
| White | Withdrew (WD) |
| Blank | Did not participate |

=== LMP3 Drivers Championship ===
| Pos. | Drivers | Car | DUB (United Arab Emirates) | | ABU (United Arab Emirates) | | Points |
|---|---|---|---|---|---|---|---|
| 1 | (France) Christophe Cresp | Ligier JS P320 | 2 | 2 | 3 | 2 | 69 |
| 1 | (France) Antoine Doquin | Ligier JS P320 | 2 | 2 | 3 | 2 | 69 |
| 1 | (France) Steven Palette | Ligier JS P320 | 2 | 2 | 3 | 2 | 69 |
| 2 | (United Kingdom) Nick Adcock | Ligier JS P320 | 1 | 3 | 5 | 3 | 65 |
| 2 | (France) Edouard Cauhaupé | Ligier JS P320 | 1 | 3 | 5 | 3 | 65 |
| 2 | (Denmark) Michael Jensen | Ligier JS P320 | 1 | 3 | 5 | 3 | 65 |
| 3 | (Germany) Torsten Kratz | Duqueine M30 - D08 | 4 | 4 | 2 | 4 | 54 |
| 3 | (Germany) Hendrik Still | Duqueine M30 - D08 | 4 | 4 | 2 | 4 | 54 |
| 3 | (Germany) Leonard Weiss | Duqueine M30 - D08 | 4 | 4 | 2 | 4 | 54 |
| 4 | (United Kingdom) Colin Noble | Ligier JS P320 | 7 | 1 | 4 | 6 | 51 |
| 4 | (United Kingdom) Anthony Wells | Ligier JS P320 | 7 | 1 | 4 | 6 | 51 |
| 5 | (Russia) Vyaceslav Gutak | Ligier JS P320 | 3 | 6 | Ret | 1 | 48 |
| 5 | (Spain) Xavier Lloveras | Ligier JS P320 | 3 | 6 | Ret | 1 | 48 |
| 5 | (France) Fabrice Rossello | Ligier JS P320 | 3 | 6 | Ret | 1 | 48 |
| 6 | (Mexico) Sebastián Álvarez | Duqueine M30 - D08 | **Ret** | **7** | **1** | **7** | 41 |
| 6 | (France) Mathieu de Barbuat | Duqueine M30 - D08 | **Ret** | **7** | **1** | **7** | 41 |
| 6 | (Germany) Laurents Hörr | Duqueine M30 - D08 | **Ret** | **7** | **1** | **7** | 41 |
| 7 | (Portugal) Guilherme Oliveira | Ligier JS P320 | 5 | 5 | 6 | 5 | 38 |
| 7 | (Chile) Nico Pino | Ligier JS P320 | 5 | 5 | 6 | 5 | 38 |
| 8 | (Russia) Alexander Bukhantsov | Ligier JS P320 | 5 | 5 | | | 20 |
| 9 | (Canada) James Dayson | Ligier JS P320 | | | 6 | 5 | 18 |
| 10 | (Russia) Nikita Alexandrov | Duqueine M30 - D08 | 6 | 8 | 8 | Ret | 16 |
| 10 | (Finland) Jesse Salmenautio | Duqueine M30 - D08 | 6 | 8 | 8 | Ret | 16 |
| 10 | (Finland) Tomi Veijalainen | Duqueine M30 - D08 | 6 | 8 | 8 | Ret | 16 |
| 11 | (South Africa) Jordan Grogor | Ginetta G61-LT-P3 | 8 | Ret | 7 | Ret | 10 |
| 11 | (Hong Kong) Shaun Thong | Ginetta G61-LT-P3 | 8 | Ret | 7 | Ret | 10 |
| 11 | (Luxembourg) Gabriele Rindone | Ginetta G61-LT-P3 | 8 | Ret | 7 | Ret | 10 |

Key
| Colour | Result |
|---|---|
| Gold | Race winner |
| Silver | 2nd place |
| Bronze | 3rd place |
| Green | Points finish |
| Blue | Non-points finish |
| Blue | Non-classified finish (NC) |
| Purple | Did not finish (Ret) |
| Black | Disqualified (DSQ) |
| Black | Excluded (EX) |
| White | Did not start (DNS) |
| White | Race cancelled (C) |
| White | Withdrew (WD) |
| Blank | Did not participate |

**Bold** – Pole

=== GT Drivers Championship ===
| Pos. | Team | Car | DUB (United Arab Emirates) | | ABU (United Arab Emirates) | | Points |
|---|---|---|---|---|---|---|---|
| 1 | (United Kingdom) Ben Barnicoat | McLaren 720S GT3 | **1** | 2 | 2 | 5 | 72 |
| 1 | (United States) Brendan Iribe | McLaren 720S GT3 | **1** | 2 | 2 | 5 | 72 |
| 1 | (United Kingdom) Ollie Millroy | McLaren 720S GT3 | **1** | 2 | 2 | 5 | 72 |
| 2 | (Germany) Ralf Bohn | Porsche 911 GT3 R | 8 | 6 | 1 | 1 | 62 |
| 2 | (Germany) Alfred Renauer | Porsche 911 GT3 R | 8 | 6 | 1 | 1 | 62 |
| 2 | (Germany) Robert Renauer | Porsche 911 GT3 R | 8 | 6 | 1 | 1 | 62 |
| 3 | (Italy) Rino Mastronardi | Ferrari 488 GT3 Evo 2020 | 2 | 1 | 7 | 6 | 57 |
| 3 | (South Africa) David Perel | Ferrari 488 GT3 Evo 2020 | 2 | 1 | 7 | 6 | 57 |
| 3 | (Italy) Davide Rigon | Ferrari 488 GT3 Evo 2020 | 2 | 1 | 7 | 6 | 57 |
| 4 | (France) Vincent Abril | Ferrari 488 GT3 Evo 2020 | 3 | 3 | 3 | Ret | 45 |
| 4 | (United States) Conrad Grunewald | Ferrari 488 GT3 Evo 2020 | 3 | 3 | 3 | Ret | 45 |
| 4 | (Monaco) Louis Prette | Ferrari 488 GT3 Evo 2020 | 3 | 3 | 3 | Ret | 45 |
| 5 | (Oman) Ahmad Al Harthy | Aston Martin Vantage AMR GT3 | 6 | 5 | 5 | 4 | 40 |
| 5 | (Republic of Ireland) Charlie Eastwood | Aston Martin Vantage AMR GT3 | 6 | 5 | 5 | 4 | 40 |
| 5 | (United Kingdom) Sam De Haan | Aston Martin Vantage AMR GT3 | 6 | 5 | 5 | 4 | 40 |
| 6 | (United Kingdom) Nick Moss | McLaren 720S GT3 | 4 | 4 | 4 | 9 | 38 |
| 6 | (United Kingdom) Joe Osborne | McLaren 720S GT3 | 4 | 4 | 4 | 9 | 38 |
| 6 | (United Kingdom) Andrew Watson | McLaren 720S GT3 | 4 | 4 | 4 | 9 | 38 |
| 7 | (United Kingdom) Frank Bird | McLaren 720S GT3 | 5 | 8 | 14 | 3 | 29.5 |
| 7 | (Germany) Marvin Kirchhöfer | McLaren 720S GT3 | 5 | 8 | 14 | 3 | 29.5 |
| 7 | (Sweden) Alexander West | McLaren 720S GT3 | 5 | 8 | 14 | 3 | 29.5 |
| 8 | (Hong Kong) Antares Au | Porsche 911 GT3 R | 12 | Ret | 17 | **2** | 20 |
| 8 | (Austria) Klaus Bachler | Porsche 911 GT3 R | 12 | Ret | 17 | **2** | 20 |
| 8 | (China) Yifei Ye | Porsche 911 GT3 R | 12 | Ret | 17 | **2** | 20 |
| 9 | (Germany) Hubert Haupt | Mercedes-AMG GT3 Evo | 7 | 9 | 9 | 7 | 16 |
| 9 | (India) Arjun Maini | Mercedes-AMG GT3 Evo | 7 | 9 | 9 | 7 | 16 |
| 9 | (Finland) Rory Penttinen | Mercedes-AMG GT3 Evo | 7 | 9 | 9 | 7 | 16 |
| 10 | (United Kingdom) Jonathan Adam | Aston Martin Vantage AMR GT3 | 9 | **11** | **6** | 11 | 13 |
| 10 | (Portugal) Henrique Chaves | Aston Martin Vantage AMR GT3 | 9 | **11** | **6** | 11 | 13 |
| 10 | (United Kingdom) John Hartshorne | Aston Martin Vantage AMR GT3 | 9 | **11** | **6** | 11 | 13 |
| 11 | (Netherlands) Nicky Catsburg | BMW M4 GT3 | 10 | 7 | 11 | 12 | 8 |
| 11 | (United States) Chandler Hull | BMW M4 GT3 | 10 | 7 | 11 | 12 | 8 |
| 11 | (United States) Jon Miller | BMW M4 GT3 | 10 | 7 | 11 | 12 | 8 |
| 12 | (Japan) Tomonobu Fujii | Aston Martin Vantage AMR GT3 | 17 | 10 | 8 | Ret | 5.5 |
| 12 | (United Kingdom) Tom Gamble | Aston Martin Vantage AMR GT3 | 17 | 10 | 8 | Ret | 5.5 |
| 12 | (Japan) Satoshi Hoshino | Aston Martin Vantage AMR GT3 | 17 | 10 | 8 | Ret | 5.5 |
| 13 | (United Kingdom) Ben Barker | Porsche 911 GT3 R | 14 | 13 | 12 | 8 | 5.5 |
| 13 | (Italy) Giorgio Roda | Porsche 911 GT3 R | 14 | 13 | 12 | 8 | 5.5 |
| 13 | (Austria) Philipp Sager | Porsche 911 GT3 R | 14 | 13 | 12 | 8 | 5.5 |
| 14 | (Poland) Michał Broniszewski | Ferrari 488 GT3 Evo 2020 | DNS | DNS | 10 | 10 | 2 |
| 14 | (Italy) David Fumanelli | Ferrari 488 GT3 Evo 2020 | DNS | DNS | 10 | 10 | 2 |
| 14 | (Denmark) Mikkel Jensen | Ferrari 488 GT3 Evo 2020 | DNS | DNS | 10 | 10 | 2 |
| 15 | (Canada) Mikaël Grenier | Mercedes-AMG GT3 Evo | 11 | 12 | 16 | 16 | 2 |
| 15 | (United Kingdom) Ian Loggie | Mercedes-AMG GT3 Evo | 11 | 12 | 16 | 16 | 2 |
| 15 | (Germany) Valentin Pierburg | Mercedes-AMG GT3 Evo | 11 | 12 | 16 | 16 | 2 |
| 16 | (Puerto Rico) Victor Gomez | Ferrari 488 GT3 Evo 2020 | 13 | 18 | 18 | 13 | 2 |
| 16 | (Italy) Alessandro Pier Guidi | Ferrari 488 GT3 Evo 2020 | 13 | 18 | 18 | 13 | 2 |
| 16 | (Puerto Rico) Francesco Piovanetti | Ferrari 488 GT3 Evo 2020 | 13 | 18 | 18 | 13 | 2 |
| 17 | (Denmark) Nicolai Kjærgaard | McLaren 720S GT3 | 19 | 14 | 13 | 19 | 2 |
| 17 | (Venezuela) Manuel Maldonado | McLaren 720S GT3 | 19 | 14 | 13 | 19 | 2 |
| 17 | (United Kingdom) James Vowles | McLaren 720S GT3 | 19 | 14 | 13 | 19 | 2 |
| 18 | (Germany) Alex Aka | Audi R8 LMS Evo | 15 | 15 | 19 | 14 | 2 |
| 18 | (United Kingdom) Finlay Hutchison | Audi R8 LMS Evo | 15 | 15 | 19 | 14 | 2 |
| 18 | (Germany) Florian Scholze | Audi R8 LMS Evo | 15 | 15 | 19 | 14 | 2 |
| 19 | (Zimbabwe) Axcil Jefferies | Ferrari 488 GT3 Evo 2020 | 16 | 16 | 15 | 15 | 2 |
| 19 | (Poland) Roman Ziemian | Ferrari 488 GT3 Evo 2020 | 16 | 16 | 15 | 15 | 2 |
| 19 | (Italy) Francesco Zollo | Ferrari 488 GT3 Evo 2020 | 16 | 16 | 15 | 15 | 2 |
| 20 | (Germany) Finn Gehrsitz | Porsche 911 GT3 R | 18 | 17 | 20 | 17 | 2 |
| 20 | (Germany) Jürgen Häring | Porsche 911 GT3 R | 18 | 17 | 20 | 17 | 2 |
| 20 | (Germany) Marco Seefried | Porsche 911 GT3 R | 18 | 17 | 20 | 17 | 2 |
| 21 | (Germany) Jörg Breuer | BMW M4 GT3 | 20 | 19 | 22 | 20 | 2 |
| 21 | (Germany) Henry Walkenhorst | BMW M4 GT3 | 20 | 19 | 22 | 20 | 2 |
| 22 | (Netherlands) Peter Kox | Porsche 911 GT3 R | Ret | 20 | 21 | 18 | 1.5 |
| 22 | (Netherlands) Stéphane Kox | Porsche 911 GT3 R | Ret | 20 | 21 | 18 | 1.5 |
| 22 | (Netherlands) Nico Pronk | Porsche 911 GT3 R | Ret | 20 | 21 | 18 | 1.5 |
| 23 | (Germany) Mario Von Bohlen | BMW M4 GT3 | 20 | 19 | | | 1 |
| 24 | (Germany) Friedrich Von Bohlen | BMW M4 GT3 | | | 22 | 20 | 1 |
| 25 | (Malaysia) Douglas Khoo | Audi R8 LMS Evo | 21 | Ret | NC | 21 | 1 |
| 26 | (Hong Kong) Edgar Lau | Audi R8 LMS Evo | 21 | Ret | | | 0.5 |
| 26 | (Canada) Bashar Mardini | Audi R8 LMS Evo | 21 | Ret | | | 0.5 |
| 27 | (United States) Jean-Francois Brunot | Audi R8 LMS Evo | | | NC | 21 | 0.5 |

Key
| Colour | Result |
|---|---|
| Gold | Race winner |
| Silver | 2nd place |
| Bronze | 3rd place |
| Green | Points finish |
| Blue | Non-points finish |
| Blue | Non-classified finish (NC) |
| Purple | Did not finish (Ret) |
| Black | Disqualified (DSQ) |
| Black | Excluded (EX) |
| White | Did not start (DNS) |
| White | Race cancelled (C) |
| White | Withdrew (WD) |
| Blank | Did not participate |

**Bold** – Pole

=== GT Am Drivers Championship ===
| Pos. | Team | Car | DUB (United Arab Emirates) | | ABU (United Arab Emirates) | | Points |
|---|---|---|---|---|---|---|---|
| 1 | (Canada) Mikaël Grenier | Mercedes-AMG GT3 Evo | 1 | 1 | 2 | 2 | 86 |
| 1 | (United Kingdom) Ian Loggie | Mercedes-AMG GT3 Evo | 1 | 1 | 2 | 2 | 86 |
| 1 | (Germany) Valentin Pierburg | Mercedes-AMG GT3 Evo | 1 | 1 | 2 | 2 | 86 |
| 2 | (Zimbabwe) Axcil Jefferies | Ferrari 488 GT3 Evo 2020 | 2 | 2 | 1 | 1 | 86 |
| 2 | (Poland) Roman Ziemian | Ferrari 488 GT3 Evo 2020 | 2 | 2 | 1 | 1 | 86 |
| 2 | (Italy) Francesco Zollo | Ferrari 488 GT3 Evo 2020 | 2 | 2 | 1 | 1 | 86 |
| 3 | (Germany) Finn Gehrsitz | Porsche 911 GT3 R | 3 | 3 | 3 | 3 | 60 |
| 3 | (Germany) Jürgen Häring | Porsche 911 GT3 R | 3 | 3 | 3 | 3 | 60 |
| 3 | (Germany) Marco Seefried | Porsche 911 GT3 R | 3 | 3 | 3 | 3 | 60 |
| 4 | (Germany) Jörg Breuer | BMW M4 GT3 | 4 | 4 | 4 | 4 | 48 |
| 4 | (Germany) Henry Walkenhorst | BMW M4 GT3 | 4 | 4 | 4 | 4 | 48 |
| 5 | (Germany) Mario Von Bohlen | BMW M4 GT3 | 4 | 4 | | | 24 |
| 6 | (Germany) Friedrich Von Bohlen | BMW M4 GT3 | | | 4 | 4 | 24 |
| 7 | (Malaysia) Douglas Khoo | Audi R8 LMS Evo | 5 | Ret | NC | 5 | 20 |
| 8 | (Hong Kong) Edgar Lau | Audi R8 LMS Evo | 5 | Ret | | | 10 |
| 8 | (Canada) Bashar Mardini | Audi R8 LMS Evo | 5 | Ret | | | 10 |
| 9 | (United States) Jean-Francois Brunot | Audi R8 LMS Evo | | | NC | 5 | 10 |

Key
| Colour | Result |
|---|---|
| Gold | Race winner |
| Silver | 2nd place |
| Bronze | 3rd place |
| Green | Points finish |
| Blue | Non-points finish |
| Blue | Non-classified finish (NC) |
| Purple | Did not finish (Ret) |
| Black | Disqualified (DSQ) |
| Black | Excluded (EX) |
| White | Did not start (DNS) |
| White | Race cancelled (C) |
| White | Withdrew (WD) |
| Blank | Did not participate |

**Bold** – Pole
