= 2022 4 Hours of Abu Dhabi =

Endurance sportscar racing event

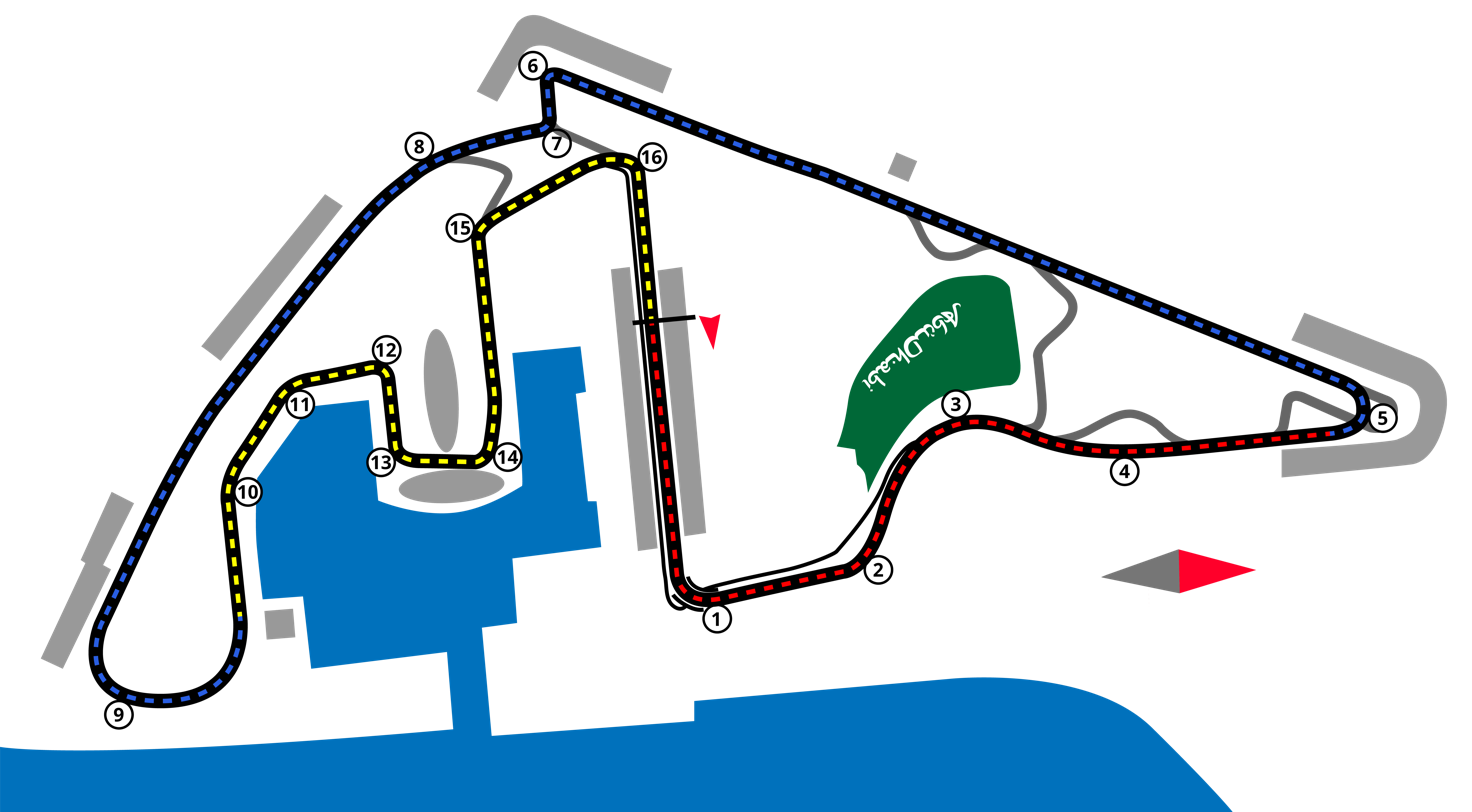
The layout of the Yas Marina Circuit

The 2022 4 Hours of Abu Dhabi was an endurance sportscar racing event held between 18 and 20 February 2022, as the final rounds of 2022 Asian Le Mans Series season.

== Schedule ==
| Date | Time (local: GST) | Event |
|---|---|---|
| Friday, 18 February | 10:10 | Free Practice 1 |
| Friday, 18 February | 15:45 | Free Practice 2 |
| Saturday, 19 February | 9:35 | Qualifying - GT |
| Saturday, 19 February | 10:15 | Qualifying - LMP3 |
| Saturday, 19 February | 10:55 | Qualifying - LMP2 |
| Saturday, 19 February | 14:30 | Race 1 |
| Sunday, 20 February | 16:30 | Race 2 |

== Free practice ==
- Only the fastest car in each class is shown.

| Free Practice 1 | Class | No. | Entrant | Time |
|---|---|---|---|---|
| Free Practice 1 | LMP2 | 23 | (United Kingdom) United Autosports | 1:42.052 |
| Free Practice 1 | LMP3 | 2 | (Luxembourg) DKR Engineering | 1:47.748 |
| Free Practice 1 | GT | 6 | (Germany) Bilstein Haupt Racing Team | 1:51.739 |
| Free Practice 2 | Class | No. | Entrant | Time |
| Free Practice 2 | LMP2 | 23 | (United Kingdom) United Autosports | 1:40.754 |
| Free Practice 2 | LMP3 | 13 | (Poland) Inter Europol Competition | 1:48.162 |
| Free Practice 2 | GT | 6 | (Germany) Bilstein Haupt Racing Team | 1:51.904 |

== Race 1 ==
=== Qualifying ===
Pole positions in each class are indicated in bold.

| Pos. | Class | No. | Entry | Driver | Time | Grid |
|---|---|---|---|---|---|---|
| 1 | **LMP2** | **23** | **(United Kingdom) United Autosports** | **(United Kingdom) Paul di Resta** | **1:39.804** | 1 |
| 2 | LMP2 | 4 | (United Kingdom) Nielsen Racing | (United Kingdom) Ben Hanley | 1:40.430 | 2 |
| 3 | LMP2 | 39 | (France) Graff | (Switzerland) David Droux | 1:42.393 | 3 |
| 4 | LMP2 | 44 | (Slovakia) ARC Bratislava | (Australia) Neale Muston | 1:44.728 | 4 |
| 5 | LMP2 | 49 | (Denmark) High Class Racing | (Denmark) Dennis Andersen | 1:45.296 | 5 |
| 6 | **LMP3** | **2** | **(Luxembourg) DKR Engineering** | **(Germany) Laurents Hörr** | **1:46.452** | 6 |
| 7 | LMP3 | 26 | (Russia) G-Drive Racing | (Spain) Xavier Lloveras | 1:47.609 | 7 |
| 8 | LMP3 | 13 | (Poland) Inter Europol Competition | (Chile) Nico Pino | 1:47.881 | 8 |
| 9 | LMP3 | 72 | (Finland) Koiranen Kemppi Motorsport | (Finland) Jesse Salmenautio | 1:47.998 | 9 |
| 10 | LMP3 | 8 | (United Kingdom) Nielsen Racing | (United Kingdom) Colin Noble | 1:48.065 | 10 |
| 11 | LMP3 | 22 | (Germany) Rinaldi Racing | (Germany) Hendrik Still | 1:48.281 | 11 |
| 12 | LMP3 | 3 | (Spain) CD Sport | (France) Edouard Cauhaupé | 1:48.294 | 12 |
| 13 | LMP3 | 27 | (Spain) CD Sport | (France) Steven Palette | 1:48.407 | 13 |
| 14 | LMP3 | 21 | (Austria) Konrad Motorsport | (South Africa) Jordan Grogor | 1:48.630 | 14 |
| 15 | **GT** | **95** | **(United Kingdom) TF Sport** | **(United Kingdom) Jonathan Adam** | **1:50.576** | 15 |
| 16 | GT | 33 | (Germany) Herberth Motorsport | (Austria) Klaus Bachler | 1:50.755 | 16 |
| 17 | GT | 20 | (Germany) SPS automotive performance | (Canada) Mikaël Grenier | 1:50.935 | 17 |
| 18 | GT | 69 | Oman Racing Team with TF Sport | (Republic of Ireland) Charlie Eastwood | 1:50.970 | 18 |
| 19 | GT | 77 | (Japan) D'station Racing | (United Kingdom) Tom Gamble | 1:51.021 | 19 |
| 20 | GT | 7 | (United Kingdom) Inception Racing with Optimum Motorsport | (United Kingdom) Ben Barnicoat | 1:51.145 | 20 |
| 21 | GT | 6 | (Germany) Bilstein Haupt Racing Team | (India) Arjun Maini | 1:51.235 | 21 |
| 22 | GT | 17 | (Italy) AF Corse | (France) Vincent Abril | 1:51.286 | 22 |
| 23 | GT | 55 | (Germany) Rinaldi Racing | (Italy) Davide Rigon | 1:51.538 | 23 |
| 24 | GT | 57 | (Switzerland) Kessel Racing | (Zimbabwe) Axcil Jefferies | 1:51.661 | 24 |
| 25 | GT | 74 | (Switzerland) Kessel Racing | (Denmark) Mikkel Jensen | 1:51.687 | 25 |
| 26 | GT | 12 | (Italy) Dinamic Motorsport | (United Kingdom) Ben Barker | 1:51.719 | 26 |
| 27 | GT | 99 | (Germany) Herberth Motorsport | (Germany) Marco Seefried | 1:51.787 | 27 |
| 28 | GT | 91 | (Germany) Herberth Motorsport | (Germany) Robert Renauer | 1:51.812 | 28 |
| 29 | GT | 34 | (Germany) Walkenhorst Motorsport | (Netherlands) Nicky Catsburg | 1:51.826 | 29 |
| 30 | GT | 51 | (Italy) AF Corse | (Italy) Alessandro Pier Guidi | 1:51.831 | 30 |
| 31 | GT | 88 | (United Kingdom) Garage 59 | (Germany) Marvin Kirchhöfer | 1:51.924 | 31 |
| 32 | GT | 42 | (United Kingdom) Inception Racing with Optimum Motorsport | (United Kingdom) Joe Osborne | 1:51.978 | 32 |
| 33 | GT | 96 | (Germany) Attempto Racing | (Germany) Alex Aka | 1:52.055 | 33 |
| 34 | GT | 59 | (United Kingdom) Garage 59 | (Denmark) Nicolai Kjærgaard | 1:52.721 | 34 |
| 35 | GT | 48 | (United Arab Emirates) S’Aalocin by Kox Racing | (Netherlands) Peter Kox | 1:54.611 | 35 |
| 36 | GT | 66 | (China) YC Panda Racing | (United States) Jean-Francois Brunot | 1:54.710 | 36 |
| 37 | GT | 35 | (Germany) Walkenhorst Motorsport | (Germany) Jörg Breuer | 1:55.890 | 37 |

=== Race ===
==== Race result ====
The minimum number of laps for classification (70% of overall winning car's distance) was 77 laps. Class winners are marked in bold.

| Pos | Class | No. | Team | Drivers | Car | Tyres | Laps | Time/Gap |
|---|---|---|---|---|---|---|---|---|
| 1 | **LMP2** | **23** | **(United Kingdom) United Autosports** | **(United States) Josh Pierson** **(United Kingdom) Paul di Resta** | **Oreca 07** | MI | **111** | **4:03:07.579** |
| 2 | LMP2 | 4 | (United Kingdom) Nielsen Racing | (United Kingdom) Matthew Bell (United Kingdom) Ben Hanley (United States) Rodrigo Sales | Oreca 07 | MI | 110 | +1 Lap |
| 3 | LMP2 | 39 | (France) Graff | (Switzerland) David Droux (Switzerland) Sébastien Page (France) Eric Trouillet | Oreca 07 | MI | 109 | +2 Laps |
| 4 | LMP2 | 49 | (Denmark) High Class Racing | (Denmark) Dennis Andersen (Denmark) Anders Fjordbach (United States) Kevin Weeda | Oreca 07 | MI | 108 | +3 Laps |
| 5 | LMP2 | 44 | (Slovakia) ARC Bratislava | (Australia) John Corbett (Slovakia) Miroslav Konôpka (Australia) Neale Muston | Ligier JS P217 | MI | 106 | +5 Laps |
| 6 | **LMP3** | **2** | **(Luxembourg) DKR Engineering** | **(Mexico) Sebastián Álvarez** **(France) Mathieu de Barbuat** **(Germany) Laurents Hörr** | **Duqueine M30 – D08** | MI | **105** | **+6 Laps** |
| 7 | LMP3 | 22 | (Germany) Rinaldi Racing | (Germany) Torsten Kratz (Germany) Hendrik Still (Germany) Leonard Weiss | Duqueine M30 - D08 | MI | 105 | +6 Laps |
| 8 | LMP3 | 27 | (Spain) CD Sport | (France) Christophe Cresp (France) Antoine Doquin (France) Steven Palette | Ligier JS P320 | MI | 105 | +6 Laps |
| 9 | LMP3 | 8 | (United Kingdom) Nielsen Racing | (United Kingdom) Colin Noble (United Kingdom) Anthony Wells | Ligier JS P320 | MI | 104 | +7 Laps |
| 10 | LMP3 | 3 | (Spain) CD Sport | (United Kingdom) Nick Adcock (France) Edouard Cauhaupé (Denmark) Michael Jensen | Ligier JS P320 | MI | 104 | +7 Laps |
| 11 | **GT** | **91** | **(Germany) Precote Herberth Motorsport** | **(Germany) Ralf Bohn** **(Germany) Alfred Renauer** **(Germany) Robert Renauer** | **Porsche 911 GT3 R** | MI | **103** | **+8 Laps** |
| 12 | LMP3 | 13 | (Poland) Inter Europol Competition | (Portugal) Guilherme Oliveira (Chile) Nico Pino (Canada) James Dayson | Ligier JS P320 | MI | 103 | +8 Laps |
| 13 | GT | 7 | (United Kingdom) Inception Racing with Optimum Motorsport | (United Kingdom) Ben Barnicoat (United States) Brendan Iribe (United Kingdom) Ollie Millroy | McLaren 720S GT3 | MI | 103 | +8 Laps |
| 14 | GT | 17 | (Italy) AF Corse | (France) Vincent Abril (United States) Conrad Grunewald (Monaco) Louis Prette | Ferrari 488 GT3 Evo 2020 | MI | 103 | +8 Laps |
| 15 | GT | 42 | (United Kingdom) Inception Racing with Optimum Motorsport | (United Kingdom) Nick Moss (United Kingdom) Joe Osborne (United Kingdom) Andrew Watson | McLaren 720S GT3 | MI | 103 | +8 Laps |
| 16 | LMP3 | 21 | (Austria) Konrad Motorsport | (South Africa) Jordan Grogor (Hong Kong) Shaun Thong (Luxembourg) Gabriele Rindone | Ginetta G61-LT-P3 | MI | 103 | +8 Laps |
| 17 | GT | 69 | Oman Racing Team with TF Sport | (Republic of Ireland) Charlie Eastwood (Oman) Ahmad Al Harthy (United Kingdom) Sam De Haan | Aston Martin Vantage AMR GT3 | MI | 103 | +8 Laps |
| 18 | GT | 95 | (United Kingdom) TF Sport | (United Kingdom) Jonathan Adam (Portugal) Henrique Chaves (United Kingdom) John Hartshorne | Aston Martin Vantage AMR GT3 | MI | 103 | +8 Laps |
| 19 | GT | 55 | (Germany) Rinaldi Racing | (Italy) Rino Mastronardi (South Africa) David Perel (Italy) Davide Rigon | Ferrari 488 GT3 Evo 2020 | MI | 103 | +8 Laps |
| 20 | GT | 77 | (Japan) D'station Racing | (Japan) Tomonobu Fujii (United Kingdom) Tom Gamble (Japan) Satoshi Hoshino | Aston Martin Vantage AMR GT3 | MI | 102 | +9 Laps |
| 21 | GT | 6 | (Germany) Bilstein Haupt Racing Team | (Germany) Hubert Haupt (India) Arjun Maini (Finland) Rory Penttinen | Mercedes-AMG GT3 Evo | MI | 102 | +9 Laps |
| 22 | GT | 74 | (Switzerland) Kessel Racing | (Poland) Michael Broniszewski (Italy) David Fumanelli (Denmark) Mikkel Jensen | Ferrari 488 GT3 Evo 2020 | MI | 102 | +9 Laps |
| 23 | GT | 34 | (Germany) Walkenhorst Motorsport | (Netherlands) Nicky Catsburg (United States) Chandler Hull (United States) Jon Miller | BMW M6 GT3 | MI | 102 | +9 Laps |
| 24 | GT | 12 | (Italy) Dinamic Motorsport | (United Kingdom) Ben Barker (Italy) Giorgio Roda (Austria) Philipp Sager | Porsche 911 GT3 R | MI | 102 | +9 Laps |
| 25 | GT | 59 | (United Kingdom) Garage 59 | (Denmark) Nicolai Kjærgaard (Venezuela) Manuel Maldonado (United Kingdom) James Vowles | Aston Martin Vantage AMR GT3 | MI | 102 | +9 Laps |
| 26 | GT | 88 | (United Kingdom) Garage 59 | (United Kingdom) Frank Bird (Germany) Marvin Kirchhöfer (Sweden) Alexander West | Aston Martin Vantage AMR GT3 | MI | 102 | +9 Laps |
| 27 | GT | 57 | (Switzerland) Kessel Racing | (Zimbabwe) Axcil Jefferies (Poland) Roman Ziemian (Italy) Francesco Zollo | Ferrari 488 GT3 Evo 2020 | MI | 101 | +10 Laps |
| 28 | GT | 20 | (Germany) SPS automotive performance | (Canada) Mikaël Grenier (United Kingdom) Ian Loggie (Germany) Valentin Pierburg | Mercedes-AMG GT3 Evo | MI | 101 | +10 Laps |
| 29 | GT | 33 | (Germany) Precote Herberth Motorsport | (Hong Kong) Antares Au (Austria) Klaus Bachler (China) Yifei Ye | Porsche 911 GT3 R | MI | 101 | +10 Laps |
| 30 | GT | 51 | (Italy) AF Corse | (Italy) Alessandro Pier Guidi (Brazil) Oswaldo Negri Jr. (Puerto Rico) Francesco Piovanetti | Ferrari 488 GT3 Evo 2020 | MI | 101 | +10 Laps |
| 31 | GT | 96 | (Germany) Attempto Racing | (Germany) Alex Aka (United Kingdom) Finlay Hutchison (Germany) Florian Scholze | Audi R8 LMS Evo | MI | 101 | +10 Laps |
| 32 | LMP3 | 72 | (Finland) Koiranen Kemppi Motorsport | (Russia) Nikita Alexandrov (Finland) Jesse Salmenautio (Finland) Tomi Veijalainen | Duqueine M30 - D08 | MI | 100 | +11 Laps |
| 33 | GT | 99 | (Germany) Herberth Motorsport | (Germany) Finn Gehrsitz (Germany) Jürgen Häring (Germany) Marco Seefried | Porsche 911 GT3 R | MI | 100 | +11 Laps |
| 34 | GT | 48 | (United Arab Emirates) S’Aalocin by Kox Racing | (Netherlands) Peter Kox (Netherlands) Stéphane Kox (Netherlands) Nico Pronk | Porsche 911 GT3 R | MI | 100 | +11 Laps |
| 35 | GT | 35 | (Germany) Walkenhorst Motorsport | (Germany) Jörg Breuer (Germany) Friedrich Von Bohlen (Germany) Henry Walkenhorst | BMW M6 GT3 | MI | 96 | +15 Laps |
Not Classified
| DNF | GT | 66 | (China) YC Panda Racing | (Malaysia) Douglas Khoo (United States) Jean-Francois Brunot | Audi R8 LMS Evo | MI | 68 | |
| DNF | LMP3 | 26 | (Russia) G-Drive Racing | (Russia) Vyaceslav Gutak (Spain) Xavier Lloveras (France) Fabrice Rossello | Ligier JS P320 | MI | 42 | |

==== Statistics ====
===== Fastest lap =====
| Class | Driver | Team | Time | Lap |
|---|---|---|---|---|
| LMP2 | (United Kingdom) Paul di Resta | (United Kingdom) #23 United Autosports | 1:40.913 | 102 |
| LMP3 | (France) Mathieu de Barbuat | (Luxembourg) #2 DKR Engineering | 1:49.001 | 58 |
| GT | (United Kingdom) Ben Barnicoat | (United Kingdom) #7 Inception Racing with Optimum Motorsport | 1:51.985 | 57 |

== Race 2 ==
=== Qualifying ===
Pole positions in each class are indicated in bold.

| Pos. | Class | No. | Entry | Driver | Time | Grid |
|---|---|---|---|---|---|---|
| 1 | **LMP2** | **23** | **(United Kingdom) United Autosports** | **(United Kingdom) Paul di Resta** | **1:39.962** | 1 |
| 2 | LMP2 | 4 | (United Kingdom) Nielsen Racing | (United Kingdom) Ben Hanley | 1:40.485 | 2 |
| 3 | LMP2 | 39 | (France) Graff | (Switzerland) David Droux | 1:42.271 | 3 |
| 4 | LMP2 | 44 | (Slovakia) ARC Bratislava | (Australia) John Corbett | 1:44.632 | 4 |
| 5 | LMP2 | 49 | (Denmark) High Class Racing | (Denmark) Dennis Andersen | 1:44.868 | 5 |
| 6 | **LMP3** | **2** | **(Luxembourg) DKR Engineering** | **(Germany) Laurents Hörr** | **1:46.301** | 6 |
| 7 | LMP3 | 3 | (Spain) CD Sport | (France) Edouard Cauhaupé | 1:47.465 | 7 |
| 8 | LMP3 | 26 | (Russia) G-Drive Racing | (Spain) Xavier Lloveras | 1:47.532 | 8 |
| 9 | LMP3 | 72 | (Finland) Koiranen Kemppi Motorsport | (Finland) Jesse Salmenautio | 1:47.925 | 9 |
| 10 | LMP3 | 8 | (United Kingdom) Nielsen Racing | (United Kingdom) Colin Noble | 1:47.926 | 10 |
| 11 | LMP3 | 13 | (Poland) Inter Europol Competition | (Chile) Nico Pino | 1:48.064 | 11 |
| 12 | LMP3 | 27 | (Spain) CD Sport | (France) Steven Palette | 1:48.199 | 12 |
| 13 | LMP3 | 22 | (Germany) Rinaldi Racing | (Germany) Hendrik Still | 1:48.255 | 13 |
| 14 | LMP3 | 21 | (Austria) Konrad Motorsport | (South Africa) Jordan Grogor | 1:48.692 | 14 |
| 15 | GT | 33 | (Germany) Herberth Motorsport | (Austria) Klaus Bachler | 1:50.670 | 15 |
| 16 | **GT** | **95** | **(United Kingdom) TF Sport** | **(United Kingdom) Jonathan Adam** | **1:50.870** | 16 |
| 17 | GT | 6 | (Germany) Bilstein Haupt Racing Team | (India) Arjun Maini | 1:50.986 | 17 |
| 18 | GT | 55 | (Germany) Rinaldi Racing | (Italy) Davide Rigon | 1:51.051 | 18 |
| 19 | GT | 7 | (United Kingdom) Inception Racing with Optimum Motorsport | (United Kingdom) Ben Barnicoat | 1:51.069 | 19 |
| 20 | GT | 69 | Oman Racing Team with TF Sport | (Republic of Ireland) Charlie Eastwood | 1:51.091 | 20 |
| 21 | GT | 77 | (Japan) D'station Racing | (United Kingdom) Tom Gamble | 1:51.097 | 21 |
| 22 | GT | 20 | (Germany) SPS automotive performance | (Canada) Mikaël Grenier | 1:51.237 | 22 |
| 23 | GT | 17 | (Italy) AF Corse | (France) Vincent Abril | 1:51.246 | 23 |
| 24 | GT | 74 | (Switzerland) Kessel Racing | (Denmark) Mikkel Jensen | 1:51.268 | 24 |
| 25 | GT | 12 | (Italy) Dinamic Motorsport | (United Kingdom) Ben Barker | 1:51.393 | 25 |
| 26 | GT | 88 | (United Kingdom) Garage 59 | (Germany) Marvin Kirchhöfer | 1:51.515 | 26 |
| 27 | GT | 34 | (Germany) Walkenhorst Motorsport | (Netherlands) Nicky Catsburg | 1:51.544 | 27 |
| 28 | GT | 51 | (Italy) AF Corse | (Italy) Alessandro Pier Guidi | 1:51.559 | 28 |
| 29 | GT | 99 | (Germany) Herberth Motorsport | (Germany) Marco Seefried | 1:51.636 | 29 |
| 30 | GT | 57 | (Switzerland) Kessel Racing | (Zimbabwe) Axcil Jefferies | 1:51.708 | 30 |
| 31 | GT | 91 | (Germany) Herberth Motorsport | (Germany) Robert Renauer | 1:51.716 | 31 |
| 32 | GT | 42 | (United Kingdom) Inception Racing with Optimum Motorsport | (United Kingdom) Joe Osborne | 1:51.923 | 32 |
| 33 | GT | 59 | (United Kingdom) Garage 59 | (Denmark) Nicolai Kjærgaard | 1:52.820 | 33 |
| 34 | GT | 48 | (United Arab Emirates) S’Aalocin by Kox Racing | (Netherlands) Peter Kox | 1:53.016 | 34 |
| 35 | GT | 66 | (China) YC Panda Racing | (Malaysia) Douglas Khoo | 2:02.141 | 35 |
| 36 | GT | 35 | (Germany) Walkenhorst Motorsport | (Germany) Friedrich Von Bohlen | 2:02.997 | 36 |
| 37 | GT | 96 | (Germany) Attempto Racing | — | | 37 |

=== Race ===
==== Race result ====
The minimum number of laps for classification (70% of overall winning car's distance) was 86 laps. Class winners are marked in bold.

| Pos | Class | No. | Team | Drivers | Car | Tyres | Laps | Time/Gap |
|---|---|---|---|---|---|---|---|---|
| 1 | **LMP2** | **23** | **(United Kingdom) United Autosports** | **(United States) Josh Pierson** **(United Kingdom) Paul di Resta** | **Oreca 07** | MI | **123** | **4:03:14.231** |
| 2 | LMP2 | 4 | (United Kingdom) Nielsen Racing | (United Kingdom) Matthew Bell (United Kingdom) Ben Hanley (United States) Rodrigo Sales | Oreca 07 | MI | 122 | +1 Lap |
| 3 | LMP2 | 39 | (France) Graff | (Switzerland) David Droux (Switzerland) Sébastien Page (France) Eric Trouillet | Oreca 07 | MI | 120 | +3 Laps |
| 4 | LMP2 | 44 | (Slovakia) ARC Bratislava | (Australia) John Corbett (Slovakia) Miroslav Konôpka (Australia) Neale Muston | Ligier JS P217 | MI | 118 | +5 Laps |
| 5 | **LMP3** | **26** | **(Russia) G-Drive Racing** | **(Russia) Vyaceslav Gutak** **(Spain) Xavier Lloveras** **(France) Fabrice Rossello** | **Ligier JS P320** | MI | **117** | **+6 Laps** |
| 6 | LMP3 | 27 | (Spain) CD Sport | (France) Christophe Cresp (France) Antoine Doquin (France) Steven Palette | Ligier JS P320 | MI | 117 | +6 Laps |
| 7 | LMP3 | 3 | (Spain) CD Sport | (United Kingdom) Nick Adcock (France) Edouard Cauhaupé (Denmark) Michael Jensen | Ligier JS P320 | MI | 117 | +6 Laps |
| 8 | LMP3 | 22 | (Germany) Rinaldi Racing | (Germany) Torsten Kratz (Germany) Hendrik Still (Germany) Leonard Weiss | Duqueine M30 - D08 | MI | 117 | +6 Laps |
| 9 | LMP3 | 13 | (Poland) Inter Europol Competition | (Portugal) Guilherme Oliveira (Chile) Nico Pino (Canada) James Dayson | Ligier JS P320 | MI | 115 | +8 Laps |
| 10 | **GT** | **91** | **(Germany) Precote Herberth Motorsport** | **(Germany) Ralf Bohn** **(Germany) Alfred Renauer** **(Germany) Robert Renauer** | **Porsche 911 GT3 R** | MI | **115** | **+8 Laps** |
| 11 | GT | 33 | (Germany) Precote Herberth Motorsport | (Hong Kong) Antares Au (Austria) Klaus Bachler (China) Yifei Ye | Porsche 911 GT3 R | MI | 115 | +8 Laps |
| 12 | GT | 88 | (United Kingdom) Garage 59 | (United Kingdom) Frank Bird (Germany) Marvin Kirchhöfer (Sweden) Alexander West | Aston Martin Vantage AMR GT3 | MI | 115 | +8 Laps |
| 13 | GT | 69 | Oman Racing Team with TF Sport | (Republic of Ireland) Charlie Eastwood (Oman) Ahmad Al Harthy (United Kingdom) Sam De Haan | Aston Martin Vantage AMR GT3 | MI | 115 | +8 Laps |
| 14 | GT | 7 | (United Kingdom) Inception Racing with Optimum Motorsport | (United Kingdom) Ben Barnicoat (United States) Brendan Iribe (United Kingdom) Ollie Millroy | McLaren 720S GT3 | MI | 115 | +8 Laps |
| 15 | GT | 55 | (Germany) Rinaldi Racing | (Italy) Rino Mastronardi (South Africa) David Perel (Italy) Davide Rigon | Ferrari 488 GT3 Evo 2020 | MI | 115 | +8 Laps |
| 16 | GT | 6 | (Germany) Bilstein Haupt Racing Team | (Germany) Hubert Haupt (India) Arjun Maini (Finland) Rory Penttinen | Mercedes-AMG GT3 Evo | MI | 115 | +8 Laps |
| 17 | GT | 12 | (Italy) Dinamic Motorsport | (United Kingdom) Ben Barker (Italy) Giorgio Roda (Austria) Philipp Sager | Porsche 911 GT3 R | MI | 115 | +8 Laps |
| 18 | GT | 42 | (United Kingdom) Inception Racing with Optimum Motorsport | (United Kingdom) Nick Moss (United Kingdom) Joe Osborne (United Kingdom) Andrew Watson | McLaren 720S GT3 | MI | 114 | +9 Laps |
| 19 | GT | 74 | (Switzerland) Kessel Racing | (Poland) Michael Broniszewski (Italy) David Fumanelli (Denmark) Mikkel Jensen | Ferrari 488 GT3 Evo 2020 | MI | 114 | +9 Laps |
| 20 | GT | 95 | (United Kingdom) TF Sport | (United Kingdom) Jonathan Adam (Portugal) Henrique Chaves (United Kingdom) John Hartshorne | Aston Martin Vantage AMR GT3 | MI | 114 | +9 Laps |
| 21 | GT | 34 | (Germany) Walkenhorst Motorsport | (Netherlands) Nicky Catsburg (United States) Chandler Hull (United States) Jon Miller | BMW M6 GT3 | MI | 114 | +9 Laps |
| 22 | GT | 51 | (Italy) AF Corse | (Italy) Alessandro Pier Guidi (Brazil) Oswaldo Negri Jr. (Puerto Rico) Francesco Piovanetti | Ferrari 488 GT3 Evo 2020 | MI | 114 | +9 Laps |
| 23 | GT | 96 | (Germany) Attempto Racing | (Germany) Alex Aka (United Kingdom) Finlay Hutchison (Germany) Florian Scholze | Audi R8 LMS Evo | MI | 114 | +9 Laps |
| 24 | GT | 57 | (Switzerland) Kessel Racing | (Zimbabwe) Axcil Jefferies (Poland) Roman Ziemian (Italy) Francesco Zollo | Ferrari 488 GT3 Evo 2020 | MI | 113 | +10 Laps |
| 25 | GT | 20 | (Germany) SPS automotive performance | (Canada) Mikaël Grenier (United Kingdom) Ian Loggie (Germany) Valentin Pierburg | Mercedes-AMG GT3 Evo | MI | 113 | +10 Laps |
| 26 | GT | 99 | (Germany) Herberth Motorsport | (Germany) Finn Gehrsitz (Germany) Jürgen Häring (Germany) Marco Seefried | Porsche 911 GT3 R | MI | 112 | +11 Laps |
| 27 | GT | 48 | (United Arab Emirates) S’Aalocin by Kox Racing | (Netherlands) Peter Kox (Netherlands) Stéphane Kox (Netherlands) Nico Pronk | Porsche 911 GT3 R | MI | 111 | +12 Laps |
| 28 | LMP2 | 49 | (Denmark) High Class Racing | (Denmark) Dennis Andersen (Denmark) Anders Fjordbach (United States) Kevin Weeda | Oreca 07 | MI | 108 | +15 Laps |
| 29 | GT | 59 | (United Kingdom) Garage 59 | (Denmark) Nicolai Kjærgaard (Venezuela) Manuel Maldonado (United Kingdom) James Vowles | Aston Martin Vantage AMR GT3 | MI | 107 | +16 Laps |
| 30 | GT | 35 | (Germany) Walkenhorst Motorsport | (Germany) Jörg Breuer (Germany) Friedrich Von Bohlen (Germany) Henry Walkenhorst | BMW M6 GT3 | MI | 107 | +16 Laps |
| 31 | LMP3 | 8 | (United Kingdom) Nielsen Racing | (United Kingdom) Colin Noble (United Kingdom) Anthony Wells | Ligier JS P320 | MI | 103 | +20 Laps |
| 32 | GT | 66 | (China) YC Panda Racing | (Malaysia) Douglas Khoo (United States) Jean-Francois Brunot | Audi R8 LMS Evo | MI | 103 | +20 Laps |
| 33 | LMP3 | 2 | (Luxembourg) DKR Engineering | (Mexico) Sebastián Álvarez (France) Mathieu de Barbuat (Germany) Laurents Hörr | Duqueine M30 – D08 | MI | 99 | +24 Laps |
Not Classified
| DNF | GT | 17 | (Italy) AF Corse | (France) Vincent Abril (United States) Conrad Grunewald (Monaco) Louis Prette | Ferrari 488 GT3 Evo 2020 | MI | 74 | |
| DNF | LMP3 | 72 | (Finland) Koiranen Kemppi Motorsport | (Russia) Nikita Alexandrov (Finland) Jesse Salmenautio (Finland) Tomi Veijalainen | Duqueine M30 - D08 | MI | 63 | |
| DNF | GT | 77 | (Japan) D'station Racing | (Japan) Tomonobu Fujii (United Kingdom) Tom Gamble (Japan) Satoshi Hoshino | Aston Martin Vantage AMR GT3 | MI | 63 | |
| DNF | LMP3 | 21 | (Austria) Konrad Motorsport | (South Africa) Jordan Grogor (Hong Kong) Shaun Thong (Luxembourg) Gabriele Rindone | Ginetta G61-LT-P3 | MI | 36 | |

==== Statistics ====
===== Fastest lap =====
| Class | Driver | Team | Time | Lap |
|---|---|---|---|---|
| LMP2 | (United Kingdom) Paul di Resta | (United Kingdom) #23 United Autosports | 1:41.723 | 67 |
| LMP3 | (Germany) Laurents Hörr | (Luxembourg) #2 DKR Engineering | 1:48.198 | 59 |
| GT | (Austria) Klaus Bachler | (Germany) #33 Precote Herberth Motorsport | 1:52.139 | 86 |
