= Alex Aka =

German racing driver (born 2000)

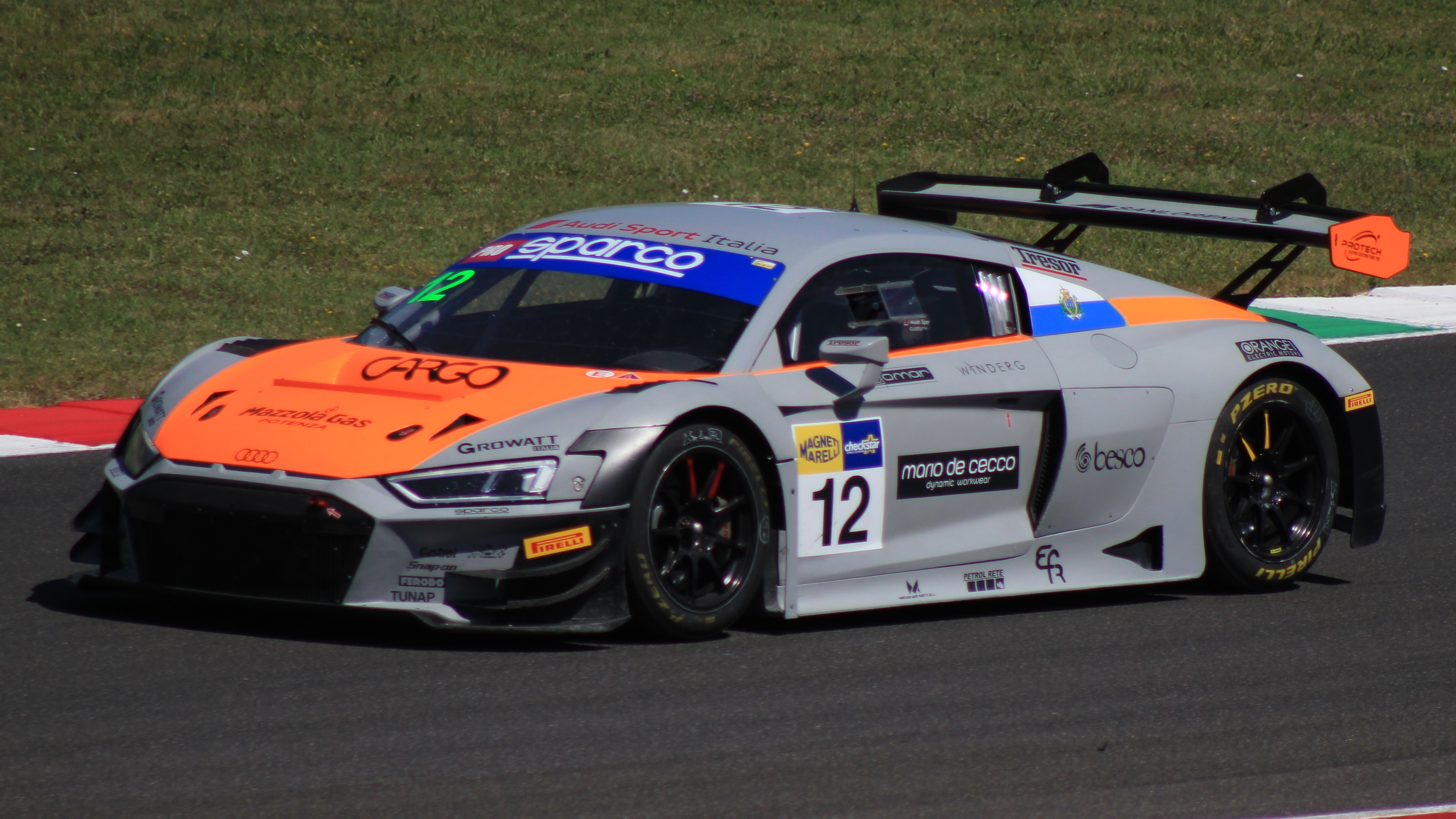
- Aka in 2024
- Nationality: (Germany) German
- Born: Alex Arkin Aka; 7 August 2000 (age 26) Germany

GT World Challenge Europe Endurance Cup career
- Debut season: 2020
- Current team: Tresor Attempto Racing
- Categorisation: FIA Silver
- Starts: 29 (29 entries)
- Wins: 0
- Podiums: 0
- Poles: 0
- Fastest laps: 0
- Best finish: 3rd in 2024

Previous series
- 2022 2021–22: Asian Le Mans Series; 24H GT Series

Alex Arkin Aka (born 7 August 2000) is a German racing driver currently competing in the GT World Challenge Europe Endurance Cup and GT World Challenge Europe Sprint Cup. He is the son of Attempto Racing team boss Arkin Aka.

== Early career ==
Aka made his car racing debut for his father's team in the Porsche GT3 Cup Challenge Benelux in 2018. The following year, Aka contested a full season of the Porsche Carrera Cup Germany, though he only finished 26th in the points standings with a best race result of 14th.

== GT3 career ==
=== GTWC Europe ===
==== 2020 ====
For the 2020 season, Aka switched to GT3 racing to compete in the Silver Cup class of the GT World Challenge Europe Endurance Cup. Partnering Nicolas Schöll for the whole campaign and Finlay Hutchison for its majority, Aka finished the year 18th in class with a best individual race finish of 24th at the Nürburgring.

==== 2021 ====
Aka competed in the Dubai 24 Hours at the start of 2021, before embarking on a double-campaign in the Silver Cup categories of the GTWC Endurance and GTWC Sprint cups. The former proved to be a vast improvement to the previous year, as he, Dennis Marschall, and Max Hofer finished on the class podium in Germany, helping them to third place in the Silver Cup standings. In the latter, Aka and Marschall scored a lone win at Valencia, which was the German's first victory in a subclass.

==== 2022 ====
Beginning 2021, Aka once again took part in the Dubai 24 Hours, where he and his teammates finished seventh, as well as racing in a full campaign of the Asian Le Mans Series. This was preparation for Aka's third season in GT3, which he would once again contest in the silver class of the Endurance and Sprint cups. The German showed progress, helping take a pole position alongside Nicolas Schöll and Marius Zug and setting a fastest lap in-class at Imola on his way to second in the Endurance Cup opener. Further class podiums came at the 24 Hours of Spa as well as the Hockenheimring round, which contributed to the trio taking second in the championship.

In the Sprint Cup, Aka and Schöll combined to claim fourth in the class standings, scoring one win at Zandvoort where Aka was able to fend off eventual champion Ulysse de Pauw in the closing laps and taking four further category podiums.

==== 2023 ====
Going into his fourth year of the Silver Cup, Aka would be joined by Lorenzo Patrese in the Sprint Cup, with Pietro Delli Guanti joining the pair in Endurance. The trio fared well despite a retirement at the season-opening Imola round, coming back with a class win in Le Castellet. They scored another podium at the Nürburgring and finished third in points. Aka and Patrese were embroiled in a title battle in Sprint, where they took a season-high five class victories with a best overall result of fourth in Valencia. However, they would miss out on the championship courtesy of a Patrese-caused collision at the final race in Zandvoort, though their efforts still saw the pair pocket the overall GTWC Europe Silver Cup title.

==== 2024 ====
In 2024, Aka contested his first full season in the Pro class, partnering Ricardo Feller and Christopher Haase in the Endurance Cup and only the former in the Sprint Cup. In the latter, Aka and Feller only scored four points finishes and a best result of fourth at Brands Hatch, leading to a ninth place overall. The Endurance Cup campaign proved more fruitful; after a sixth place in Le Castellet, Aka and his teammates ran well during the 24 Hours of Spa, leading at the halfway mark. They then finished the Nürburgring and Monza rounds in fourth place respectively, putting themselves into a close title battle with the Comtoyou Racing No. 7 and AF Corse No. 51 crews. Having sat just three points behind the leaders going into the finale at Jeddah, the Attempto lineup finished the race sixth, thus ending up third in the Endurance Cup championship.

==== 2025 ====
Aka returned to the Silver Cup class ahead of 2025. He finished third in class in the Endurance Cup, having won the category at Barcelona alongside Leonardo Moncini and Sebastian Øgaard by placing fifth overall. Thanks to two class wins at Zandvoort and Misano meanwhile, Aka found himself competing for the class title in the Sprint Cup. After a weaker final round, Aka also finished third in the Sprint Cup's class standings.

== Racing record ==
=== Racing career summary ===
Season	Series	Team	Races	Wins	Poles	F/Laps	Podiums	Points	Position
2018	Porsche GT3 Cup Challenge Benelux - Cup	Attempto Racing	2	0	0	0	0	2	21st
2019	Porsche Carrera Cup Germany	MSG/HRT Motorsport	15	0	0	0	0	2	26th
2019	DMV Dunlop 60 - Class 1	Attempto Racing	1	0	0	0	0	3	26th
2020	GT World Challenge Europe Endurance Cup	Attempto Racing	4	0	0	0	0	0	NC
2020	GT World Challenge Europe Endurance Cup - Silver	Attempto Racing	4	0	0	0	0	21	18th
2020	Intercontinental GT Challenge	Attempto Racing	1	0	0	0	0	0	NC
2021	24H GT Series - GT3	Attempto Racing	1	0	0	0	0	0	NC
2021	GT World Challenge Europe Endurance Cup	Attempto Racing	5	0	0	0	0	2	30th
2021	GT World Challenge Europe Endurance Cup - Silver	Attempto Racing	5	0	0	0	1	73	**3rd**
2021	GT World Challenge Europe Sprint Cup	Attempto Racing	10	0	0	0	0	7.5	24th
2021	GT World Challenge Europe Sprint Cup - Silver	Attempto Racing	8	1	0	0	1	37.5	11th
2022	24H GT Series - GT3	Attempto Racing	1	0	0	0	0	16	NC†
2022	Asian Le Mans Series - GT	Attempto Racing	4	0	0	0	0	2	18th
2022	GT World Challenge Europe Endurance Cup	Attempto Racing	5	0	0	0	0	4	32nd
2022	GT World Challenge Europe Endurance Cup - Silver	Attempto Racing	5	0	1	1	3	76	**2nd**
2022	GT World Challenge Europe Sprint Cup	Attempto Racing	10	0	0	0	0	5.5	19th
2022	GT World Challenge Europe Sprint Cup - Silver	Attempto Racing	10	1	0	1	5	80.5	4th
2022	Intercontinental GT Challenge	Tresor Attempto Racing	1	0	0	0	0	6	19th
2022–23	Middle East Trophy - GT3	Tresor by Attempto Racing	1	0	0	0	0	0	NC†
2023	GT World Challenge Europe Endurance Cup	Tresor Attempto Racing	5	0	0	0	0	0	NC
2023	GT World Challenge Europe Endurance Cup - Silver	Tresor Attempto Racing	5	1	1	0	2	87	**3rd**
2023	GT World Challenge Europe Sprint Cup	Tresor Attempto Racing	10	0	0	0	0	8.5	16th
2023	GT World Challenge Europe Sprint Cup - Silver	Tresor Attempto Racing	10	5	2	3	7	118	**2nd**
2023–24	Asian Le Mans Series - GT	Attempto Racing	5	0	0	0	1	20	14th
2023–24	Middle East Trophy - GT3	Attempto Racing	2	0	0	0	0	34	6th
2024	GT World Challenge Europe Endurance Cup	Tresor Attempto Racing	5	0	0	0	0	60	**3rd**
2024	GT World Challenge Europe Sprint Cup	Tresor Attempto Racing	10	0	0	1	0	21.5	9th
2024	International GT Open	Tresor Attempto Racing	6	0	0	0	0	0	45th
2024	Le Mans Cup - GT3	Steller Motorsport	1	0	0	0	0	21	7th*
2024	Italian GT Endurance Championship - GT3	Tresor Audi Sport Italia	4	0	0	1	1	43	4th
2025	Middle East Trophy - GT3	Tresor Attempto Racing	2	0	0	0	0	0	NC†
2025	GT World Challenge Europe Endurance Cup	Tresor Attempto Racing	5	0	0	0	0	10	16th
2025	GT World Challenge Europe Sprint Cup	Tresor Attempto Racing	10	0	0	0	0	9.5	16th
2025	24H Series - GT3	Continental Racing by Simpson Motorsport	1	0	0	0	0	0	NC†
2025–26	24H Series Middle East - GT3	Continental Racing with Simpson Motorsport	2	0	0	0	0	40	11th
2025–26	24H Series Middle East - GT3 Am	Continental Racing with Simpson Motorsport	2	1	?	?	2	94	**1st**
2026	24H Series - GT3	Continental Racing by Simpson Motorsport	4	0	0	0	0	68	16th
2026	GT World Challenge Europe Endurance Cup	Tresor Attempto Racing	4	0	0	0	0	6	29th
2026	GT World Challenge Europe Sprint Cup	Tresor Attempto Racing	10	1	0	0	1	25	12th
2026	Italian GT Championship Endurance Cup - GT3	Tresor Attempto Racing	3	0	0	0	0	13	16th
2026	Italian GT Championship Sprint Cup - GT3	Tresor Attempto Racing	6	0	0	0	2	31	9th

^{†} As Aka was a guest driver, he was ineligible to score points.
* Season still in progress.

=== Complete Porsche Carrera Cup Germany results ===
(key) (Races in bold indicate pole position) (Races in italics indicate fastest lap)

Year	Team	1	2	3	4	5	6	7	8	9	10	11	12	13	14	15	16	DC	Points
2019	MSG/HRT Motorsport	HOC1; 1; 21	HOC1; 2 DNS	MST; 1; 23	MST; 2; 19	RBR; 1; 14	RBR; 2; 25	NOR; 1 Ret	NOR; 2; 20	ZAN; 1 Ret	ZAN; 2; 22	NÜR; 1 Ret	NÜR; 2; 22	HOC2; 1; 16	HOC2; 2; 21	SAC; 1 Ret	SAC; 2; 29	26th	2

=== Complete GT World Challenge results ===
==== GT World Challenge Europe Endurance Cup ====
(Races in bold indicate pole position) (Races in italics indicate fastest lap)

Year	Team	Car	Class	1	2	3	4	5	6	7	Pos.	Points
2020	Attempto Racing	Audi R8 LMS Evo	Silver	IMO; 28	NÜR; 24	SPA; 6H; 56	SPA; 12H; 56	SPA; 24H; Ret	LEC; Ret		18th	21
2021	Attempto Racing	Audi R8 LMS Evo	Silver	MON; 15	LEC; 18	SPA; 6H; 28	SPA; 12H; 23	SPA; 24H; 15	NÜR; 9	CAT; 15	3rd	73
2022	Attempto Racing	Audi R8 LMS Evo II	Silver	**IMO**; 16	LEC; 39	SPA; 6H; 30	SPA; 12H; 13	SPA; 24H; 15	HOC; 8	CAT; 17	2nd	76
2023	Tresor Attempto Racing	Audi R8 LMS Evo II	Silver	**MNZ**; Ret	LEC; 15	SPA; 6H; 21	SPA; 12H; 23	SPA; 24H; 47†	NÜR; 18	CAT; 28	3rd	87
2024	Tresor Attempto Racing	Audi R8 LMS Evo II	Pro	LEC; 6	SPA; 6H; 3	SPA; 12H; 1	SPA; 24H; 12	NÜR; 4	MNZ; 4	JED; 6	3rd	60
2025	Tresor Attempto Racing	Audi R8 LMS Evo II	Silver	LEC; 23	MNZ; 13	SPA; 6H; 16	SPA; 12H; 61†	SPA; 24H; Ret	NÜR; Ret	CAT; 5	3rd	67
2026	Tresor Attempto Racing	Audi R8 LMS Evo II	Gold	LEC; Ret	MNZ	SPA; 6H; 65†	SPA; 12H; 65†	SPA; 24H; Ret	NÜR; 7	ALG; 30	11th	29

^{*}Season still in progress.

==== GT World Challenge Europe Sprint Cup ====
Year	Team	Car	Class	1	2	3	4	5	6	7	8	9	10	Pos.	Points
2021	Attempto Racing	Audi R8 LMS Evo	Pro	MAG; 1; 19	MAG; 2; 18									24th	7.5
2021	Attempto Racing	Audi R8 LMS Evo	Silver			ZAN; 1; 17	ZAN; 2; 12	MIS; 1; 13	MIS; 2 Ret	BRH; 1; 13	BRH; 2; 13	VAL; 1; 4	VAL; 2; 24†	11th	37.5
2022	Attempto Racing	Audi R8 LMS Evo II	Silver	BRH; 1; 10	BRH; 2; 9	MAG; 1; 14	MAG; 2; 9	ZAN; 1; 12	ZAN; 2; 8	MIS; 1 Ret	MIS; 2; 9	VAL; 1; 19	VAL; 2; 20	4th	80.5
2023	Tresor Attempto Racing	Audi R8 LMS Evo II	Silver	**BRH**; **1**; 10	BRH; 2; 21	MIS; 1; 18	MIS; 2; 12	HOC; 1; 33†	HOC; 2; 13	VAL; 1; 10	VAL; 2; 4	**ZAN**; **1**; 13	ZAN; 2; 25†	2nd	118
2024	Tresor Attempto Racing	Audi R8 LMS Evo II	Pro	BRH; 1; 4	BRH; 2; 4	MIS; 1 Ret	MIS; 2; 26	HOC; 1 Ret	HOC; 2 Ret	MAG; 1; 12	MAG; 2; 6	CAT; 1; 16	CAT; 2; 8	9th	21.5
2025	Tresor Attempto Racing	Audi R8 LMS Evo II	Silver	BRH; 1; 23	BRH; 2; 11	**ZAN**; **1**; 10	ZAN; 2; 6	**MIS**; **1**; 6	**MIS**; **2**; 30	MAG; 1 Ret	MAG; 2; 21	VAL; 1 Ret	VAL; 2; 12	3rd	77
2026	Tresor Attempto Racing	Audi R8 LMS Evo II	Gold	**BRH**; **1** Ret	BRH; 2 Ret	**MIS**; **1**; 5	MIS; 2; 8	MAG; 1; 14	MAG; 2; 37	ZAN; 1; 14	ZAN; 2; 14	**CAT**; **1**; 1	CAT; 2; 10	2nd	90.5
