= Ferrari 488 GTE =

Grand tourer racing car

Ferrari 488 GTE Ferrari 488 GTE Evo
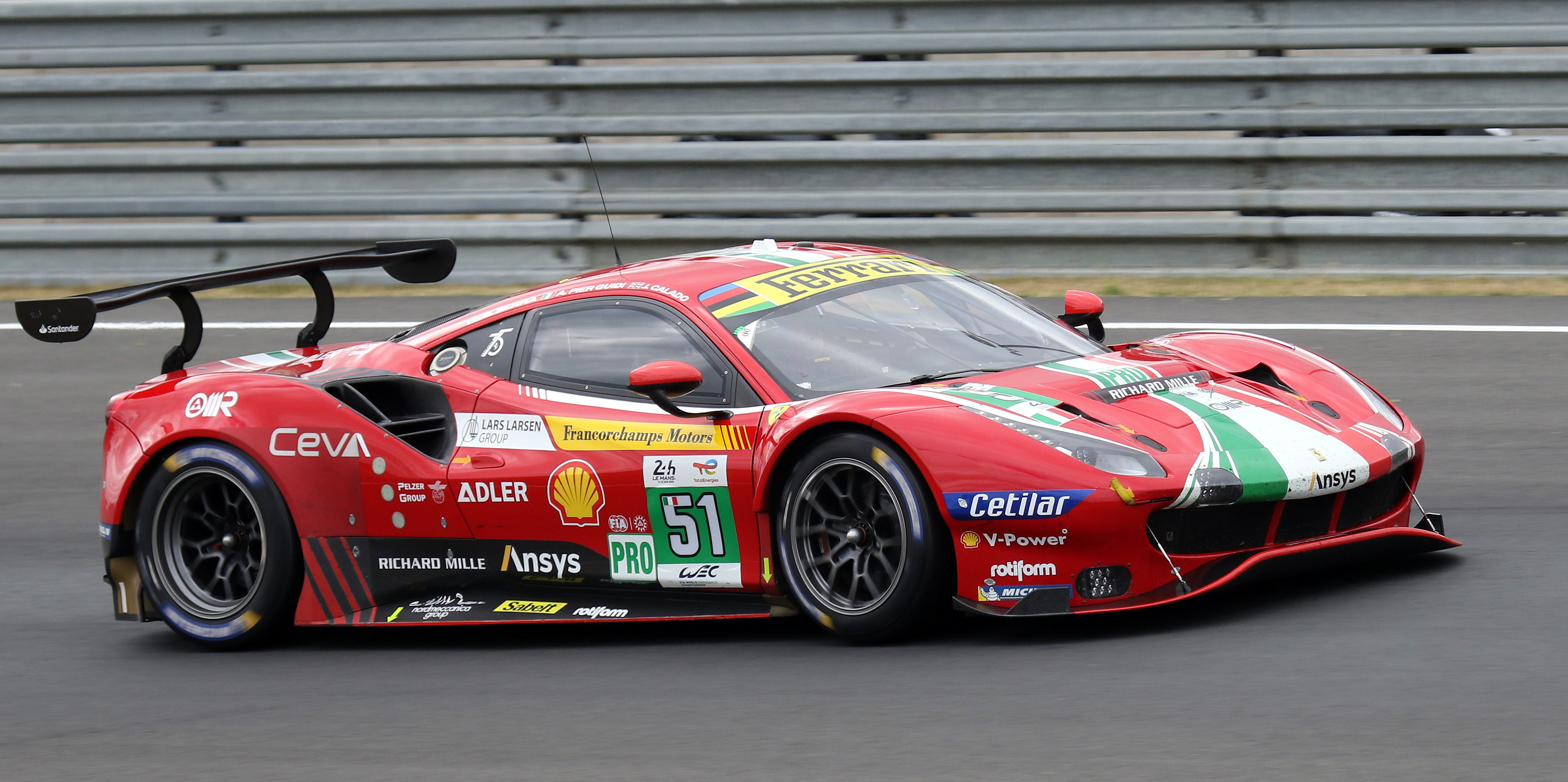
- The No. 51 AF Corse 488 GTE Evo during the 2022 24 Hours of Le Mans
- Category: LM GTE (FIA WEC & ELMS); GTLM (IMSA SCC)
- Constructor: Ferrari Competizioni GT
- Designer: Flavio Manzoni (styling)
- Predecessor: Ferrari 458 Italia GT
- Successor: Ferrari 296 GT3 (LM GT3)

Technical specifications
- Chassis: Carbon-fibre monocoque with safety roll cage
- Length: 4,614 mm (182 in)
- Width: 2,050 mm (81 in)
- Height: 1,090 mm (43 in)
- Axle track: 2,045 mm (81 in) (Front & Rear)
- Wheelbase: 2,710 mm (107 in)
- Engine: Ferrari F154 CB 3,996 cc (4.0 L; 243.9 cu in), 90° V8, twin-turbocharged direct-injected DOHC RMR
- Torque: 700 N⋅m (516 lb⋅ft) @ 5,200 rpm
- Transmission: Ferrari/Xtrac 6-speed sequential semi-automatic
- Power: In excess of 600 bhp (447 kW; 608 PS) @ 6,000 rpm
- Weight: ACO regulated base weight 1,245 kg (2,745 lb)
- Fuel: Shell V-Power (2016-2017) later TotalEnergies Excellium (2018-2023)
- Lubricants: Shell Helix Ultra (WEC) or Pennzoil Ultra Platinum (IMSA)
- Tyres: Michelin; Dunlop; front 30/68-18; rear 31/71-18

Competition history
- Notable entrants: (Italy) AF Corse (United States) Risi Competizione (United States) Scuderia Corsa (Italy) Iron Lynx (Italy) Iron Dames (Switzerland) Kessel Racing (Japan) MR Racing (Russia) SMP Racing (Singapore) Clearwater Racing (South Africa) Pablo Clark Racing (United Kingdom) Red River Sport (United States) Riley Motorsports (United Kingdom) Inception Racing (Switzerland) Spirit of Race
- Notable drivers: (United Kingdom) Sam Bird (Brazil) Felipe Fraga (New Zealand) Shane van Gisbergen (Italy) Alessandro Pier Guidi (United Kingdom) James Calado (Switzerland) Thomas Flohr (Brazil) Daniel Serra (Spain) Miguel Molina (Italy) Francesco Castellacci (Denmark) Nicklas Nielsen (France) François Perrodo (Italy) Alessio Rovera (France) Emmanuel Collard (Finland) Toni Vilander (Australia) Nick Cassidy (United States) Memo Gidley (Colombia) Óscar Tunjo (Finland) Patrick Kujala (Italy) Fabrizio Crestani (Italy) Antonio Fuoco (Portugal) Álvaro Parente (Italy) Matteo Cressoni (Argentina) Luís Pérez Companc (Italy) Roberto Lacorte (France) Côme Ledogar (Italy) Alessandro Balzan (Japan) Kei Cozzolino (Italy) Raffaele Giammaria (United Kingdom) Johnny Mowlem (Italy) Davide Rigon (Denmark) Michelle Gatting (Belgium) Sarah Bovy (Italy) Manuela Gostner (United Kingdom) Katherine Legge (Italy) Claudio Schiavoni (Japan) Naoki Yokomizo (Italy) Andrea Piccini (Finland) Toni Vilander (Italy) Rino Mastronardi (Switzerland) Rahel Frey (Italy) Paolo Ruberti (Monaco) Olivier Beretta (Denmark) Mikkel Mac (United States) Anthony Lazzaro (Denmark) Mikkel Jensen (Italy) Davide Rigon (United Kingdom) Jonny Cocker (Monaco) Vincent Abril (Italy) Giancarlo Fisichella
- Debut: 2016 24 Hours of Daytona
- First win: 2016 6 Hours of Silverstone
- Last win: 2023 6 Hours of Fuji
- Last event: 2023 8 Hours of Bahrain
Races	Wins	Poles
80	45	24
- Teams' Championships: 6 (2017 ELMS, 2017 FIA WEC, 2019 ELMS, 2019-20 FIA WEC (LMGTE Am), 2021 ELMS, 2021 FIA WEC (LMGTE Am)
- Constructors' Championships: 4 (2016 FIA WEC, 2017 FIA WEC, 2021 FIA WEC, 2022 FIA WEC
- Drivers' Championships: 8 (2017 ELMS, 2017 FIA WEC, 2019 ELMS, 2019-20 FIA WEC (LMGTE Am), 2021 ELMS, 2021 FIA WEC, 2021 FIA WEC (LMGTE Am), 2022 FIA WEC

The Ferrari 488 GTE is a grand tourer racing car built by Ferrari's in-house Competizioni GT unit, for competition in endurance racing. It was served as a replacement for the Ferrari 458 Italia GT racing car, using the Ferrari 488 GTB as a base. The car is built in accordance with the Automobile Club de l'Ouest/FIA LM GTE regulations introduced for the 2016 season, and it formerly competed in the FIA World Endurance Championship, European Le Mans Series and in the GTLM class of the IMSA SportsCar Championship. The car had its race debut at the 2016 24 Hours of Daytona, with the Scuderia Corsa and Risi Competizione teams.

== Development ==
=== Ferrari 488 GTE ===
The No. 61 488 GTE of Clearwater Racing during the 2018 6 Hours of Silverstone

Following the launch of the Ferrari 488, a Ferrari spokesperson confirmed that a racing version of the car would be unveiled soon. On 30 August 2015, spy photographs taken at the ACI Vallelunga Circuit showed tests of a highly camouflaged car undergoing testing, with major differences compared to the outgoing 458 Italia GT. The car was launched at the 2015 Finali Mondiali at the Mugello Circuit, alongside its GT3 counterpart. At the launch, few details of the car were shared, with the engine carrying over from the 488 GTB being the main announcement. The car can shift between LM GTE, and Group GT3 specification.

=== Ferrari 488 GTE Evo ===
On 13 November 2017, Ferrari Competizioni GT technical coordinator Ferdinando Cannizzo confirmed that both the 488 GTE and GT3 would be receiving Evo kits, aimed at improving reliability, as well as aero performance optimization. The 488 GTE Evo had its shakedown test at Ferrari's Fiorano Circuit on 30 March 2018. Following a wind tunnel test at the WindShear facility, the 488 GTE Evo had its front dive-planes removed. Cannizzo suggested that the car could remain in competition until 2021 with a second Evolution, instead of Ferrari developing a new car.

== Competition History ==
=== Complete FIA World Endurance Championship results ===
Results in bold indicate pole position. Results in italics indicate fastest lap.

Year	Entrant	Class	Drivers	No.	1	2	3	4	5	6	7	8	9	Points	Pos
2016	(Italy) AF Corse	LMGTE Pro			(United Kingdom) SIL	(Belgium) SPA	(France) LMN	(Germany) NUR	(Mexico) MEX	(United States) COTA	(Japan) FUJ	(China) SHA	(Bahrain) BHR	Points	Pos
2016	(Italy) AF Corse	LMGTE Pro	(Italy) Gianmaria Bruni	51	2	Ret	Ret	1	2	2	3	3	2	**128**	**5th**
2016	(Italy) AF Corse	LMGTE Pro	(United Kingdom) James Calado	51	2	Ret	Ret	1	2	2	3	3	2	**128**	**5th**
2016	(Italy) AF Corse	LMGTE Pro	(Italy) Alessandro Pier Guidi	51			Ret							**128**	**5th**
2016	(Italy) AF Corse	LMGTE Pro	(Italy) Davide Rigon	71	1	1	Ret	2	4	3	4	5	3	**134**	**3rd**
2016	(Italy) AF Corse	LMGTE Pro	(United Kingdom) Sam Bird	71	1	1	Ret	2	4	3	4	5	3	**134**	**3rd**
2016	(Italy) AF Corse	LMGTE Pro	(Italy) Andrea Bertolini	71			Ret							**134**	**3rd**
2017	(Italy) AF Corse	LMGTE Pro			(United Kingdom) SIL	(Belgium) SPA	(France) LMN	(Germany) NUR	(Mexico) MEX	(United States) COTA	(Japan) FUJ	(China) SHA	(Bahrain) BHR	Points	Pos
2017	(Italy) AF Corse	LMGTE Pro	(United Kingdom) James Calado	51	2	2	7	1	6	1	1	3	2	**164**	**1st**
2017	(Italy) AF Corse	LMGTE Pro	(Italy) Alessandro Pier Guidi	51	2	2	7	1	6	1	1	3	2	**164**	**1st**
2017	(Italy) AF Corse	LMGTE Pro	(Italy) Michele Rugolo	51			7							**164**	**1st**
2017	(Italy) AF Corse	LMGTE Pro	(Italy) Davide Rigon	71	5	1	5	8	2	3	5	6	1	**143**	**4th**
2017	(Italy) AF Corse	LMGTE Pro	(United Kingdom) Sam Bird	71	5	1	5		2	3	5	6	1	**143**	**4th**
2017	(Italy) AF Corse	LMGTE Pro	(Spain) Miguel Molina	71			5							**143**	**4th**
2017	(Italy) AF Corse	LMGTE Pro	(Finland) Toni Vilander	71				8						**143**	**4th**
2017	(Switzerland) Spirit of Race	LMGTE Am	(Switzerland) Thomas Flohr	54	NC	4	7	2	4	3	1	Ret	3	**117**	**4th**
2017	(Switzerland) Spirit of Race	LMGTE Am	(Italy) Francesco Castellacci	54	NC	4	7	2	4	3	1	Ret	3	**117**	**4th**
2017	(Switzerland) Spirit of Race	LMGTE Am	(Spain) Miguel Molina	54	NC	4		2	4	3	1	Ret	3	**117**	**4th**
2017	(Switzerland) Spirit of Race	LMGTE Am	(Monaco) Olivier Beretta	54			7							**117**	**4th**
2017	(Switzerland) Spirit of Race	LMGTE Am	(United Kingdom) Duncan Cameron	55			1							**NC**	**NC**
2017	(Switzerland) Spirit of Race	LMGTE Am	(United Kingdom) Aaron Scott	55			1							**NC**	**NC**
2017	(Switzerland) Spirit of Race	LMGTE Am	(Italy) Marco Cioci	55			1							**NC**	**NC**
2017	(Singapore) Clearwater Racing	LMGTE Am	(Singapore) Richard Wee	60			6							**NC**	**NC**
2017	(Singapore) Clearwater Racing	LMGTE Am	(Japan) Hiroki Katoh	60			6							**NC**	**NC**
2017	(Singapore) Clearwater Racing	LMGTE Am	(Portugal) Álvaro Parente	60			6							**NC**	**NC**
2017	(Singapore) Clearwater Racing	LMGTE Am	(Malaysia) Weng Sun Mok	61	1	3	2	4	5	2	2	4	2	**179**	**2nd**
2017	(Singapore) Clearwater Racing	LMGTE Am	(Japan) Keita Sawa	61	1	3	2	4	5	2	2	4	2	**179**	**2nd**
2017	(Singapore) Clearwater Racing	LMGTE Am	(Republic of Ireland) Matt Griffin	61	1	3	2	4	5	2	2	4	2	**179**	**2nd**
2018 - 2019	(Italy) AF Corse	LMGTE Pro			(Belgium) SPA	(France) LMN	(United Kingdom) SIL	(Japan) FUJ	(China) SHA	(United States) SEB	(Belgium) SPA	(France) LMN		Points	Pos
2018 - 2019	(Italy) AF Corse	LMGTE Pro	(United Kingdom) James Calado	51	9	4	1	4	5	4	2	1		**194**	**2nd**
2018 - 2019	(Italy) AF Corse	LMGTE Pro	(Italy) Alessandro Pier Guidi	51	9	4	1	4	5	4	2	1		**194**	**2nd**
2018 - 2019	(Italy) AF Corse	LMGTE Pro	(Brazil) Daniel Serra	51		4				4		1		**194**	**2nd**
2018 - 2019	(Italy) AF Corse	LMGTE Pro	(United Kingdom) Sam Bird	71	3	6	7	10	6	6	6	Ret		**194**	**2nd**
2018 - 2019	(Italy) AF Corse	LMGTE Pro	(Italy) Davide Rigon	71	3	6	7	10	6	6	6	Ret		**194**	**2nd**
2018 - 2019	(Italy) AF Corse	LMGTE Pro	(Spain) Miguel Molina	71		6				6		Ret		**194**	**2nd**
2018 - 2019	(Switzerland) Spirit of Race	LMGTE Am	(Italy) Francesco Castellacci	54	8	2	9	5	4	2	4	7		**99**	**4th**
2018 - 2019	(Switzerland) Spirit of Race	LMGTE Am	(Italy) Giancarlo Fisichella	54	8	2	9	5	4	2	4	7		**99**	**4th**
2018 - 2019	(Switzerland) Spirit of Race	LMGTE Am	(Switzerland) Thomas Flohr	54	8	2	9	5	4	2	4	7		**99**	**4th**
2018 - 2019	(Singapore) Clearwater Racing	LMGTE Am	(Republic of Ireland) Matt Griffin	61	3	4	5	6	7		3	3		**95**	**5th**
2018 - 2019	(Singapore) Clearwater Racing	LMGTE Am	(Japan) Keita Sawa	61	3	4	5	6	7					**95**	**5th**
2018 - 2019	(Singapore) Clearwater Racing	LMGTE Am	(Malaysia) Weng Sun Mok	61	3	4	5	6	7					**95**	**5th**
2018 - 2019	(Singapore) Clearwater Racing	LMGTE Am	(Argentina) Luis Pérez Companc	61							3	3		**95**	**5th**
2018 - 2019	(Singapore) Clearwater Racing	LMGTE Am	(Italy) Matteo Cressoni	61							3	3		**95**	**5th**
2018 - 2019	(Japan) MR Racing	LMGTE Am	(Monaco) Olivier Beretta	70	5	5	7	Ret	6	5	8	5		**71**	**8th**
2018 - 2019	(Japan) MR Racing	LMGTE Am	(Italy) Eddie Cheever III	70	5	5	7	Ret	6	5	8	5		**71**	**8th**
2018 - 2019	(Japan) MR Racing	LMGTE Am	(Japan) Motoaki Ishikawa	70	5	5	7	Ret	6	5	8	5		**71**	**8th**
2019 - 2020	(Italy) AF Corse	LMGTE Pro			(United Kingdom) SIL	(Japan) FUJ	(China) SHA	(Bahrain) BHR	(United States) COTA	(Belgium) SPA	(France) LMN	(Bahrain) BHR		Points	Pos
2019 - 2020	(Italy) AF Corse	LMGTE Pro	(United Kingdom) James Calado	51	4	4	1	4	3	4	2	6		**250**	**3rd**
2019 - 2020	(Italy) AF Corse	LMGTE Pro	(Italy) Alessandro Pier Guidi	51	4	4	1	4	3	4	2			**250**	**3rd**
2019 - 2020	(Italy) AF Corse	LMGTE Pro	(Brazil) Daniel Serra	51							2	6		**250**	**3rd**
2019 - 2020	(Italy) AF Corse	LMGTE Pro	(Italy) Davide Rigon	71	Ret	5	6	2	5	6	NC	3		**250**	**3rd**
2019 - 2020	(Italy) AF Corse	LMGTE Pro	(Spain) Miguel Molina	71	Ret	5	6	2	5	6	NC	3		**250**	**3rd**
2019 - 2020	(Italy) AF Corse	LMGTE Pro	(United Kingdom) Sam Bird	71							NC			**250**	**3rd**
2019 - 2020	(Italy) AF Corse	LMGTE Am	(Italy) Francesco Castellacci	54	9	6	8	5	7	7	7	4		**71**	**8th**
2019 - 2020	(Italy) AF Corse	LMGTE Am	(Italy) Giancarlo Fisichella	54	9	6	8	5	7	7	7	4		**71**	**8th**
2019 - 2020	(Italy) AF Corse	LMGTE Am	(Switzerland) Thomas Flohr	54	9	6	8	5	7	7	7	4		**71**	**8th**
2019 - 2020	(Italy) AF Corse	LMGTE Am	(France) Emmanuel Collard	83	1	2	4	4	4	1	3	2		**167**	**1st**
2019 - 2020	(Italy) AF Corse	LMGTE Am	(Denmark) Nicklas Nielsen	83	1	2	4	4	4	1	3	2		**167**	**1st**
2019 - 2020	(Italy) AF Corse	LMGTE Am	(France) François Perrodo	83	1	2	4	4	4	1	3	2		**167**	**1st**
2019 - 2020	(United Kingdom) Red River Sport	LMGTE Am	(United Kingdom) Bonamy Grimes	62	8	10	10	8	8	8	9	10		**26**	**11th**
2019 - 2020	(United Kingdom) Red River Sport	LMGTE Am	(United Kingdom) Charles Hollings	62	8	10	10	8	8	8	9			**26**	**11th**
2019 - 2020	(United Kingdom) Red River Sport	LMGTE Am	(United Kingdom) Johnny Mowlem	62	8	10	10	8	8	8	9			**26**	**11th**
2019 - 2020	(United Kingdom) Red River Sport	LMGTE Am	(Japan) Kei Cozzolino	62								10		**26**	**11th**
2019 - 2020	(United Kingdom) Red River Sport	LMGTE Am	(United Kingdom) Colin Noble	62								10		**26**	**11th**
2019 - 2020	(Japan) MR Racing	LMGTE Am	(Japan) Kei Cozzolino	70	3	4	7	7	10		Ret			**43**	**10th**
2019 - 2020	(Japan) MR Racing	LMGTE Am	(Monaco) Olivier Beretta	70	3	4	7	7	10					**43**	**10th**
2019 - 2020	(Japan) MR Racing	LMGTE Am	(Japan) Motoaki Ishikawa	70	3	4	7	7	10					**43**	**10th**
2019 - 2020	(Japan) MR Racing	LMGTE Am	(Monaco) Vincent Abril	70							Ret			**43**	**10th**
2019 - 2020	(Japan) MR Racing	LMGTE Am	(Japan) Takeshi Kimura	70							Ret			**43**	**10th**
2021	(Italy) AF Corse	LMGTE Pro			(Belgium) SPA	(Portugal) POR	(Italy) MNZ	(France) LMN	(Bahrain) BHR	(Bahrain) BHR				Points	Pos
2021	(Italy) AF Corse	LMGTE Pro	(United Kingdom) James Calado	51	2	1	2	1	3	1				**291**	**1st**
2021	(Italy) AF Corse	LMGTE Pro	(Italy) Alessandro Pier Guidi	51	2	1	2	1	3	1				**291**	**1st**
2021	(Italy) AF Corse	LMGTE Pro	(France) Côme Ledogar	51				1						**291**	**1st**
2021	(Italy) AF Corse	LMGTE Pro	(Spain) Miguel Molina	52	3	2	4	4	4	3				**291**	**1st**
2021	(Italy) AF Corse	LMGTE Pro	(Brazil) Daniel Serra	52	3	2	4	4	4	3				**291**	**1st**
2021	(Italy) AF Corse	LMGTE Pro	(United Kingdom) Sam Bird	52				4						**291**	**1st**
2021	(Italy) AF Corse	LMGTE Am	(Italy) Francesco Castellacci	54	4	3	7	7	7	6				**71**	**6th**
2021	(Italy) AF Corse	LMGTE Am	(Italy) Giancarlo Fisichella	54	4	3	7	7	7	6				**71**	**6th**
2021	(Italy) AF Corse	LMGTE Am	(Switzerland) Thomas Flohr	54	4	3	7	7	7	6				**71**	**6th**
2021	(Italy) AF Corse	LMGTE Am	(Denmark) Nicklas Nielsen	83	1	10	1	1	5	1				**150**	**1st**
2021	(Italy) AF Corse	LMGTE Am	(France) François Perrodo	83	1	10	1	1	5	1				**150**	**1st**
2021	(Italy) AF Corse	LMGTE Am	(Italy) Alessio Rovera	83	1	10	1	1	5	1				**150**	**1st**
2021	(Italy) Cetilar Racing	LMGTE Am	(Italy) Antonio Fuoco	47	3	1	10	Ret	9	4				**75**	**5th**
2021	(Italy) Cetilar Racing	LMGTE Am	(Italy) Roberto Lacorte	47	3	1	10	Ret	9	4				**75**	**5th**
2021	(Italy) Cetilar Racing	LMGTE Am	(Italy) Giorgio Sernagiotto	47	3	1	10	Ret	9	4				**75**	**5th**
2021	(Italy) Iron Lynx	LMGTE Am	(Italy) Claudio Schiavoni	60	9	5	Ret	3		5				**63.5**	**7th**
2021	(Italy) Iron Lynx	LMGTE Am	(Italy) Matteo Cressoni	60	9	5	Ret		11	5				**63.5**	**7th**
2021	(Italy) Iron Lynx	LMGTE Am	(Italy) Andrea Piccini	60	9	5	Ret		11	5				**63.5**	**7th**
2021	(Italy) Iron Lynx	LMGTE Am	(Italy) Raffaele Giammaria	60				3						**63.5**	**7th**
2021	(Italy) Iron Lynx	LMGTE Am	(Italy) Paolo Ruberti	60				3						**63.5**	**7th**
2021	(Italy) Iron Lynx	LMGTE Am	(Italy) Rino Mastronardi	60					11					**63.5**	**7th**
2021	(Italy) Iron Lynx	LMGTE Am	(Switzerland) Rahel Frey	85	8	6	8	6	8	8				**46**	**10th**
2021	(Italy) Iron Lynx	LMGTE Am	(Italy) Manuela Gostner	85	8	6								**46**	**10th**
2021	(Italy) Iron Lynx	LMGTE Am	(United Kingdom) Katherine Legge	85	8				8	8				**46**	**10th**
2021	(Italy) Iron Lynx	LMGTE Am	(Denmark) Michelle Gatting	85		6	8	6						**46**	**10th**
2021	(Italy) Iron Lynx	LMGTE Am	(Belgium) Sarah Bovy	85			8	6	8	8				**46**	**10th**
2022	(Italy) AF Corse	LMGTE Pro			(United States) SEB	(Belgium) SPA	(France) LMN	(Italy) MNZ	(Japan) FUJ	(Bahrain) BHR				Points	Pos
2022	(Italy) AF Corse	LMGTE Pro	(United Kingdom) James Calado	51	4	1	2	3	1	5				**269**	**1st**
2022	(Italy) AF Corse	LMGTE Pro	(Italy) Alessandro Pier Guidi	51	4	1	2	3	1	5				**269**	**1st**
2022	(Italy) AF Corse	LMGTE Pro	(Brazil) Daniel Serra	51			2							**269**	**1st**
2022	(Italy) AF Corse	LMGTE Pro	(Italy) Antonio Fuoco	52	5	3	3	2	2	1				**269**	**1st**
2022	(Italy) AF Corse	LMGTE Pro	(Spain) Miguel Molina	52	5	3	3	2	2	1				**269**	**1st**
2022	(Italy) AF Corse	LMGTE Pro	(Italy) Davide Rigon	52			3							**269**	**1st**
2022	(Italy) AF Corse	LMGTE Am	(United States) Simon Mann	21	7	11	7	7	10	11				**28**	**11th**
2022	(Italy) AF Corse	LMGTE Am	(Switzerland) Christoph Ulrich	21	7	11	7	7	10	11				**28**	**11th**
2022	(Italy) AF Corse	LMGTE Am	(Finland) Toni Vilander	21	7	11	7	7	10	11				**28**	**11th**
2022	(Italy) AF Corse	LMGTE Am	(Italy) Francesco Castellacci	54	9	4	5	9	4	7				**58**	**6th**
2022	(Italy) AF Corse	LMGTE Am	(Switzerland) Thomas Flohr	54	9	4	5	9	4	7				**58**	**6th**
2022	(Italy) AF Corse	LMGTE Am	(New Zealand) Nick Cassidy	54	9	4	5	9	4	7				**58**	**6th**
2022	(Switzerland) Spirit of Race	LMGTE Am	(France) Gabriel Aubry	71	Ret	12	Ret	5	7	13				**16**	**13th**
2022	(Switzerland) Spirit of Race	LMGTE Am	(France) Franck Dezoteux	71	Ret	12	Ret	5	7	13				**16**	**13th**
2022	(Switzerland) Spirit of Race	LMGTE Am	(France) Pierre Ragues	71	Ret	12	Ret	5	7	13				**16**	**13th**
2022	(Italy) Iron Lynx	LMGTE Am	(Italy) Claudio Schiavoni	60	8	8	Ret	4	11	9				**25**	**12th**
2022	(Italy) Iron Lynx	LMGTE Am	(Italy) Matteo Cressoni	60	8	8		4	11	9				**25**	**12th**
2022	(Italy) Iron Lynx	LMGTE Am	(Italy) Giancarlo Fisichella	60	8	8		4	11	9				**25**	**12th**
2022	(Italy) Iron Lynx	LMGTE Am	(Italy) Alessandro Balzan	60			Ret							**25**	**12th**
2022	(Italy) Iron Lynx	LMGTE Am	(Italy) Raffaele Giammaria	60			Ret							**25**	**12th**
2022	(Italy) Iron Dames	LMGTE Am	(Switzerland) Rahel Frey	85	5	10	6	2	2	3				**93**	**3rd**
2022	(Italy) Iron Dames	LMGTE Am	(Belgium) Sarah Bovy	85	5		6	2	2	3				**93**	**3rd**
2022	(Italy) Iron Dames	LMGTE Am	(Denmark) Michelle Gatting	85	5		6	2	2	3				**93**	**3rd**
2022	(Italy) Iron Dames	LMGTE Am	(Denmark) Christina Nielsen	85		10								**93**	**3rd**
2022	(Italy) Iron Dames	LMGTE Am	(France) Doriane Pin	85		10								**93**	**3rd**
2023	(Italy) AF Corse	LMGTE Am			(United States) SEB	(Portugal) POR	(Belgium) SPA	(France) LMN	(Italy) MNZ	(Japan) FUJ	(Bahrain) BHR			Points	Pos
2023	(Italy) AF Corse	LMGTE Am	(United States) Simon Mann	21	4	5	6	Ret	9	12	11			**38**	**10th**
2023	(Italy) AF Corse	LMGTE Am	(Belgium) Ulysse de Pauw	21	4	5	6	Ret	9					**38**	**10th**
2023	(Italy) AF Corse	LMGTE Am	(Italy) Stefano Costantini	21	4			Ret						**38**	**10th**
2023	(Italy) AF Corse	LMGTE Am	(Italy) Diego Alessi	21		5	6	Ret						**38**	**10th**
2023	(Italy) AF Corse	LMGTE Am	(Italy) Francesco Castellacci	54	5	4	NC	5	10	1	4			**91**	**3rd**
2023	(Italy) AF Corse	LMGTE Am	(Switzerland) Thomas Flohr	54	5	4	NC	5	10	1	4			**91**	**3rd**
2023	(Italy) AF Corse	LMGTE Am	(Italy) Davide Rigon	54	5	4	NC	5	10	1	4			**91**	**3rd**
2023	(Italy) Richard Mille AF Corse	LMGTE Am	(Argentina) Luis Pérez Companc	83	Ret	2	1	Ret	6	9	9			**56**	**8th**
2023	(Italy) Richard Mille AF Corse	LMGTE Am	(Italy) Alessio Rovera	83	Ret	2	1	Ret	6	9	9			**56**	**8th**
2023	(Italy) Richard Mille AF Corse	LMGTE Am	(France) Lilou Wadoux	83	Ret	2	1	Ret	6	9	9			**56**	**8th**
2023	(Switzerland) Kessel Racing	LMGTE Am	(United States) Scott Huffaker	57	3	10	8	Ret	Ret	3				**58**	**7th**
2023	(Switzerland) Kessel Racing	LMGTE Am	(Japan) Takeshi Kimura	57	3	10	8	Ret	Ret	3	5			**58**	**7th**
2023	(Switzerland) Kessel Racing	LMGTE Am	(Brazil) Daniel Serra	57	3	10	8	Ret			5			**58**	**7th**

=== Complete IMSA SportsCar Championship results ===
Results in bold indicate pole position. Results in italics indicate fastest lap.

Year	Entrant	Class	Drivers	No.	1	2	3	4	5	6	7	8	9	10	11	Points	Pos
2016	(United States) Risi Competizione	GTLM			(Florida) DAY	(Florida) SEB	(California) LBH	(California) LGA	(New York (state)) WGL	(Canada) MOS	(Connecticut) LIM	(Wisconsin) ELK	(Virginia) VIR	(Texas) AUS	(Georgia (U.S. state)) ATL	Points	Pos
2016	(United States) Risi Competizione	GTLM	(Italy) Giancarlo Fisichella	62	6	4	3	5	6	7	4	5	7	8	1	305	5th
2016	(United States) Risi Competizione	GTLM	(Finland) Toni Vilander	62	6	4	3	5	6	7	4	5	7	8	1	305	5th
2016	(United States) Risi Competizione	GTLM	(Italy) Davide Rigon	62	6	4										305	5th
2016	(United States) Risi Competizione	GTLM	(Monaco) Olivier Beretta	62	6											305	5th
2016	(United States) Risi Competizione	GTLM	(United Kingdom) James Calado	62											1	305	5th
2016	(United States) Scuderia Corsa	GTLM	(Brazil) Daniel Serra	68	4	7	6	2	5						8	164	10th
2016	(United States) Scuderia Corsa	GTLM	(Italy) Alessandro Pier Guidi	68	4	7		2	5						8	164	10th
2016	(United States) Scuderia Corsa	GTLM	(France) Alexandre Prémat	68	4											164	10th
2016	(United States) Scuderia Corsa	GTLM	(Mexico) Memo Rojas	68	4											164	10th
2016	(United States) Scuderia Corsa	GTLM	(Italy) Andrea Bertolini	68		7									8	164	10th
2016	(United States) Scuderia Corsa	GTLM	(Italy) Alessandro Balzan	68			6									164	10th
2016	(Russia) SMP Racing	GTLM	(Italy) Andrea Bertolini	72	10											22	11th
2016	(Russia) SMP Racing	GTLM	(Italy) Gianmaria Bruni	72	10											22	11th
2016	(Russia) SMP Racing	GTLM	(United Kingdom) James Calado	72	10											22	11th
2016	(Russia) SMP Racing	GTLM	(Russia) Viktor Shaytar	72	10											22	11th
2017	(United States) Risi Competizione	GTLM			(Florida) DAY	(Florida) SEB	(California) LBH	(Texas) AUS	(New York (state)) WGL	(Canada) MOS	(Connecticut) LIM	(Wisconsin) ELK	(Virginia) VIR	(California) LGA	(Georgia (U.S. state)) ATL	Points	Pos
2017	(United States) Risi Competizione	GTLM	(Italy) Giancarlo Fisichella	62	3	3	Ret	Ret					3	2	3	199	9th
2017	(United States) Risi Competizione	GTLM	(Finland) Toni Vilander	62	3	3	Ret	Ret					3	2	3	199	9th
2017	(United States) Risi Competizione	GTLM	(United Kingdom) James Calado	62	3	3										199	9th
2017	(United States) Risi Competizione	GTLM	(Italy) Alessandro Pier Guidi	62											3	199	9th
2018	(United States) Risi Competizione	GTLM			(Florida) DAY	(Florida) SEB	(California) LBH	(Ohio) MOH	(New York (state)) WGL	(Canada) MOS	(Connecticut) LIM	(Wisconsin) ELK	(Virginia) VIR	(California) LGA	(Georgia (U.S. state)) ATL	Points	Pos
2018	(United States) Risi Competizione	GTLM	(Finland) Toni Vilander	62	5	5									9	74	9th
2018	(United States) Risi Competizione	GTLM	(United Kingdom) James Calado	62	5	5										74	9th
2018	(United States) Risi Competizione	GTLM	(Italy) Alessandro Pier Guidi	62	5	5										74	9th
2018	(United States) Risi Competizione	GTLM	(Italy) Davide Rigon	62	5											74	9th
2018	(United States) Risi Competizione	GTLM	(Italy) Andrea Bertolini	62											9	74	9th
2018	(United States) Risi Competizione	GTLM	(Spain) Miguel Molina	62											9	74	9th
2019	(United States) Risi Competizione	GTLM			(Florida) DAY	(Florida) SEB	(California) LBH	(Ohio) MOH	(New York (state)) WGL	(Canada) MOS	(Connecticut) LIM	(Wisconsin) ELK	(Virginia) VIR	(California) LGA	(Georgia (U.S. state)) ATL	Points	Pos
2019	(United States) Risi Competizione	GTLM	(United Kingdom) James Calado	62	2										1	67	9th
2019	(United States) Risi Competizione	GTLM	(Italy) Alessandro Pier Guidi	62	2										1	67	9th
2019	(United States) Risi Competizione	GTLM	(Spain) Miguel Molina	62	2											67	9th
2019	(United States) Risi Competizione	GTLM	(Italy) Davide Rigon	62	2											67	9th
2019	(United States) Risi Competizione	GTLM	(Brazil) Daniel Serra	62											1	67	9th
2020	(United States) Risi Competizione	GTLM			(Florida) DAY	(Florida) DAY	(Florida) SEB	(Wisconsin) ELK	(Virginia) VIR	(Georgia (U.S. state)) ATL	(Ohio) MOH	(North Carolina) CLT	(Georgia (U.S. state)) ATL	(California) LGA	(Florida) SEB	Points	Pos
2020	(United States) Risi Competizione	GTLM	(United Kingdom) James Calado	62	6											25	7th
2020	(United States) Risi Competizione	GTLM	(Italy) Alessandro Pier Guidi	62	6											25	7th
2020	(United States) Risi Competizione	GTLM	(Italy) Davide Rigon	62	6											25	7th
2020	(United States) Risi Competizione	GTLM	(Brazil) Daniel Serra	62	6											25	7th
2021	(United States) Risi Competizione	GTLM			(Florida) DAY	(Florida) SEB	(Michigan) BEL	(New York (state)) WGL	(New York (state)) WGL	(Connecticut) LIM	(Wisconsin) ELK	(California) LGA	(California) LBH	(Virginia) VIR	(Georgia (U.S. state)) ATL	Points	Pos
2021	(United States) Risi Competizione	GTLM	(United Kingdom) James Calado	62	4											308	7th
2021	(United States) Risi Competizione	GTLM	(France) Jules Gounon	62	4											308	7th
2021	(United States) Risi Competizione	GTLM	(Italy) Alessandro Pier Guidi	62	4											308	7th
2021	(United States) Risi Competizione	GTLM	(Italy) Davide Rigon	62	4											308	7th

=== Complete European Le Mans Series results ===
(key) Races in bold indicates pole position. Races in italics indicates fastest lap.

Year	Entrant	Class	Drivers	No.	Rds.	Rounds						Pos.	Pts.
Year	Entrant	Class	Drivers	No.	Rds.	1	2	3	4	5	6	Pos.	Pts.
2017	(Switzerland) Spirit of Race	LMGTE	(Italy) Andrea Bertolini (Italy) Gianluca Roda (Italy) Giorgio Roda (Italy) Rino Mastronardi	51	All; 1-4, 6 All; 5	SIL; 4	MNZ; 4	**RBR**; **4**	LEC; 4	SPA; 1	ALG; Ret	6th	70
2017	(Switzerland) Spirit of Race	LMGTE	(United Kingdom) Duncan Cameron (Republic of Ireland) Matt Griffin (United Kingdom) Aaron Scott	55	All; All; All	SIL; 6	**MNZ**; **Ret**	RBR; 1	LEC; 1	SPA; 4	**ALG**; **Ret**	4th	77
2017	(United Kingdom) JMW Motorsport	LMGTE	(United Kingdom) Jody Fannin (United Kingdom) Robert Smith (United Kingdom) Jonny Cocker (United Kingdom) Will Stevens	66	3-6; 3-6; 3-4; 5-6	SIL	MNZ	RBR; 2	LEC; 3	SPA; 2	ALG; 2	1st*	104*
2018	(Switzerland) Spirit of Race	LMGTE	(Italy) Francesco Castellacci (Switzerland) Thomas Flohr	54	1; 1	LEC; 6	MNZ	RBR	SIL	SPA	POR	8th	8
2018	(Switzerland) Spirit of Race	LMGTE	(United Kingdom) Duncan Cameron (Republic of Ireland) Matt Griffin (United Kingdom) Aaron Scott	55	All; All; All	LEC; Ret	MNZ; 1	RBR; 2	SIL; 3	SPA; 2	POR; 4	4th	79
2018	(United Kingdom) JMW Motorsport	LMGTE	(United Kingdom) Liam Griffin (United Kingdom) Alex MacDowall (Spain) Miguel Molina	66	All; All; All	LEC; 1	MNZ; 4	**RBR**; **Ret**	SIL; 1	SPA; 4	**POR**; **2**	2nd	88
2018	(United States) Krohn Racing	LMGTE	(Italy) Andrea Bertolini (Sweden) Niclas Jönsson (United States) Tracy Krohn	83	All; All; All	LEC; 4	MNZ; 6	RBR; 5	SIL; 6	SPA; Ret	POR; 4	6th	48
2019	(United States) Luzich Racing	LMGTE	(France) Fabien Lavergne (Denmark) Nicklas Nielsen (Italy) Alessandro Pier Guidi	51	All; All; All	LEC; 1	MNZ; 3	BAR; 1	SIL; 4	SPA; 1	POR; 1	1st	127
2019	(Switzerland) Spirit of Race	LMGTE	(United Kingdom) Duncan Cameron (Republic of Ireland) Matt Griffin (United Kingdom) Aaron Scott	55	All; All; All	LEC; 5	MNZ; 7	BAR; 3	SIL; 5	SPA; 3	POR; 4	5th	68
2019	(Switzerland) Kessel Racing	LMGTE	(Italy) Sergio Pianezzola (Italy) Andrea Piccini (Italy) Claudio Schiavoni (Italy) Nicola Cadei (Italy) Giacomo Piccini (South Africa) David Perel	60	All; 1-3, 5–6; 1-3; 4; 4; 5-6	LEC; 9	MNZ; Ret	**BAR**; **8**	SIL; 3	SPA; 5	POR; 2	6th	50
2019	(Switzerland) Kessel Racing	LMGTE	(Switzerland) Rahel Frey (Denmark) Michelle Gatting (Italy) Manuela Gostner	83	All; All; All	LEC; 2	MNZ; 6	BAR; 4	SIL; 2	SPA; 4	POR; Ret	4th	68
2019	(United Kingdom) JMW Motorsport	LMGTE	(Italy) Matteo Cressoni (Canada) Lü Wei (United States) Jeff Segal	66	All; All; All	LEC; 4	MNZ; 2	BAR; 2	SIL; 6	SPA; 6	POR; 5	3rd	74
2020	(Italy) AF Corse	LMGTE	(Germany) Steffen Görig (Switzerland) Christoph Ulrich (Sweden) Alexander West (Brazil) Daniel Serra	51	1-3, 5; 1-3, 5; 1-2, 5; 3	LEC; 5	SPA; 7	LEC; 6	MNZ	ALG; Ret		8th	28
2020	(Italy) AF Corse	LMGTE	(Italy) Francesco Castellacci (Switzerland) Thomas Flohr	54	2; 2	LEC	SPA; Ret	LEC	MNZ	ALG		NC	0
2020	(Italy) AF Corse	LMGTE	(France) Emmanuel Collard (France) François Perrodo (United Kingdom) Harrison Newey (Italy) Alessio Rovera	88	2,5; 2,5; 2; 5	LEC	SPA; 2	LEC	MNZ	ALG; 8		NC	0
2020	(Switzerland) Spirit of Race	LMGTE	(United Kingdom) Duncan Cameron (Republic of Ireland) Matt Griffin (United Kingdom) Aaron Scott	55	All; All; All	LEC; Ret	SPA; 5	LEC; 1	MNZ; 4	ALG; 5		3rd	62
2020	(Italy) Iron Lynx	LMGTE	(Italy) Sergio Pianezzola (Italy) Claudio Schiavoni (Italy) Andrea Piccini (Denmark) Nicklas Nielsen (Italy) Rino Mastronardi	60	1-2, 4–5; 1-4; 1-2, 4–5; 3; 3,5	LEC; 6	SPA; Ret	LEC; 5	**MNZ**; **Ret**	**ALG**; **3**		7th	35
2020	(Italy) Iron Lynx	LMGTE	(Switzerland) Rahel Frey (Denmark) Michelle Gatting (Italy) Manuela Gostner	83	All; All; All	LEC; 3	SPA; 8	LEC; 3	MNZ; 3	ALG; 6		4th	61
2020	(United Kingdom) Red River Sport	LMGTE	(United Kingdom) Bonamy Grimes (United Kingdom) Charles Hollings (United Kingdom) Johnny Mowlem	62	2; 2; 2	LEC	SPA; DNS	LEC	MNZ	ALG		NC	0
2020	(United Kingdom) JMW Motorsport	LMGTE	(United Kingdom) Finlay Hutchison (United Kingdom) Hunter Abbott (United Kingdom) Jody Fannin (United States) Gunnar Jeannette (United States) Rodrigo Sales	66	All; 1; 1; 2-5; 2-5	LEC; 4	SPA; 9	LEC; 7	MNZ; 6	ALG; 7		6th	38
2020	(Switzerland) Kessel Racing	LMGTE	(Poland) Michał Broniszewski (South Africa) David Perel (Italy) Nicola Cadei (Brazil) Marcos Gomes	74	All; All; 1, 4–5; 2-3	**LEC**; **2**	SPA; 1	LEC; 4	MNZ; 1	ALG; 2		2nd	99
2021	(Switzerland) Spirit of Race	LMGTE	(United Kingdom) Duncan Cameron (South Africa) David Perel (Republic of Ireland) Matt Griffin (Italy) Alessandro Pier Guidi	55	All; All; 1-3, 5–6; 4	CAT; 3	RBR; 2	LEC; 2	**MNZ**; **1**	SPA; NC	ALG; 4	2nd	89
2021	(Italy) Iron Lynx	LMGTE	(Italy) Paolo Ruberti (Italy) Claudio Schiavoni (Italy) Giorgio Sernagiotto	60	All; All; All	CAT; 5	RBR; 7	LEC; 5	MNZ; 5	SPA; 5	ALG; 8	8th	50
2021	(Italy) Iron Lynx	LMGTE	(Italy) Matteo Cressoni (Italy) Rino Mastronardi (Spain) Miguel Molina	80	All; All; All	CAT; 1	RBR; 3	LEC; 1	MNZ; 2	SPA; 2	ALG; 1	1st	126
2021	(Italy) Iron Lynx	LMGTE	(Switzerland) Rahel Frey (Denmark) Michelle Gatting (Italy) Manuela Gostner (Belgium) Sarah Bovy	83	All; All; 1-4; 5-6	CAT; 4	RBR; NC	LEC; NC	MNZ; 6	SPA; 3	ALG; 3	7th	50
2021	(Italy) AF Corse	LMGTE	(France) Franck Dezoteux (France) Pierre Ragues (France) Côme Ledogar	61	6; 6; 6	CAT	RBR	LEC	MNZ	SPA	ALG; 9	NC	0
2021	(Italy) AF Corse	LMGTE	(France) Emmanuel Collard (France) François Perrodo (Italy) Alessio Rovera	83	2-6; 2-6; 2-6	CAT; WD	**RBR**; **1**	LEC; 3	MNZ; 3	SPA; 1	ALG; 10	3rd	83
2021	(United Kingdom) JMW Motorsport	LMGTE	(United Kingdom) Jody Fannin (United States) Rodrigo Sales (Italy) Andrea Fontana (Hong Kong) Shaun Thong	66	All; All; 1-5; 6	CAT; 4	RBR; NC	LEC; NC	MNZ; 6	SPA; 3	ALG; 3	6th	50
2022	(Germany) Rinaldi Racing	LMGTE	(Argentina) Nicolás Varrone (Germany) Pierre Ehret (United States) Memo Gidley (Italy) Gabriele Lancieri (Italy) Diego Alessi	32	All; 1-5; 1; 2-3; 4-6	**LEC**; **1**	IMO; Ret	MNZ; 6	CAT; 9	SPA; 10	POR; 9	8th	39
2022	(Germany) Rinaldi Racing	LMGTE	(Italy) Fabrizio Crestani (Germany) Christian Hook (Colombia) Óscar Tunjo (Netherlands) Jeroen Bleekemolen	33	1-3, 5–6; 1-3, 5–6; 1-2; 3, 5–6	LEC; 11	IMO; 6	MNZ; 9	CAT	SPA; WD	POR; Ret	12th	10
2022	(Switzerland) Spirit of Race	LMGTE	(United Kingdom) Duncan Cameron (Republic of Ireland) Matt Griffin (South Africa) David Perel	55	All; All; All	LEC; 9	IMO; 3	MNZ; 8	CAT; 2	SPA; WD	POR; WD	9th	39
2022	(Switzerland) Kessel Racing	LMGTE	(Denmark) Mikkel Jensen (Denmark) Frederik Schandorff (Japan) Takeshi Kimura (United States) Conrad Grunewald	57	All; All; 1-4, 6; 5	LEC; 5	IMO; DSQ	MNZ; 3	CAT; 4	**SPA**; **1**	POR; 3	2nd	78
2022	(Italy) Iron Lynx	LMGTE	(Italy) Matteo Cressoni (Italy) Davide Rigon (Italy) Claudio Schiavoni	60	All; All; All	LEC; 7	IMO; 5	MNZ; 1	CAT; 6	SPA; 9	POR; 4	4th	63
2022	(Italy) Iron Lynx	LMGTE	(Belgium) Sarah Bovy (Denmark) Michelle Gatting (Switzerland) Rahel Frey (France) Doriane Pin	83	All; All; 1-3; 4-6	LEC; 4	IMO; 8	MNZ; 5	CAT; Ret	SPA; 2	**POR**; **1**	3rd	70
2022	(United Kingdom) JMW Motorsport	LMGTE	(Singapore) Sean Hudspeth (Italy) Giacomo Petrobelli (New Zealand) Matthew Payne (Spain) Miguel Molina	66	All; All; 1-3, 5–6; 4	LEC; 10	IMO; 4	MNZ; 7	CAT; 3	SPA; 6	POR; 7	7th	48
2023	(Denmark) Formula Racing	LMGTE	(Denmark) Conrad Laursen (Denmark) Johnny Laursen (Denmark) Mikkel Mac (Denmark) Nicklas Nielsen	50	All; All; 1; 2-6	CAT; 2	LEC; 8	ARA; Ret	SPA; 2	ALG; 12	POR; 9	7th	42
2023	(Italy) AF Corse	LMGTE	(Portugal) Rui Águas (Belgium) Ulysse de Pauw (Greece) Kriton Lendoudis	51	All; All; All	CAT; 6	LEC; 11	ARA; 10	SPA; 4	ALG; 6	POR; 7	8th	35
2023	(Switzerland) Spirit of Race	LMGTE	(United Kingdom) Duncan Cameron (Republic of Ireland) Matt Griffin (South Africa) David Perel	55	All; All; All	CAT; 5	LEC; 5	ARA; 6	SPA; 7	ALG; 7	POR; 3	5th	55
2023	(Switzerland) Kessel Racing	LMGTE	(United States) Scott Huffaker (Japan) Takeshi Kimura (Denmark) Frederik Schandorff (Italy) Davide Rigon (Brazil) Daniel Serra	57	All; All; 1-2; 3; 4-6	CAT; 7	LEC; 4	ARA; 1	SPA; 5	ALG; 4	POR; 12	4th	65
2023	(United Kingdom) JMW Motorsport	LMGTE	(Australia) Martin Berry (United Kingdom) Lorcan Hanafin (United Kingdom) Jon Lancaster	66	All; All; All	**CAT**; **3**	LEC; 6	**ARA**; **5**	SPA; Ret	ALG; 11	POR; 4	6th	47

* Points were scored with the 458 Italia GT2
