= 2023 4 Hours of Barcelona =

Endurance sportscar racing event

The layout of the Circuit de Barcelona-Catalunya

The 2023 4 Hours of Barcelona was an endurance sportscar racing event held between 21 and 23 April 2023, as the first round of the 2023 European Le Mans Series season.

== Entry list ==
The pre-event entry list consisted of 42 entries in 4 categories - 7 in LMP2, 11 in LMP2 Pro-Am, 12 in LMP3 and 12 in LMGTE.

Rob Hodes was replaced by Dennis Andersen in No. 19 Team Virage after a crash in the Bronze Drivers Collective Test that made Hodes visit a hospital.

== Schedule ==
Date	Time (local: CEST)	Event
Friday, 21 April	11:50	Free Practice 1
Friday, 21 April	16:20	Bronze Drivers Collective Test
Saturday, 22 April	10:10	Free Practice 2
Saturday, 22 April	14:40	Qualifying - LMGTE
Saturday, 22 April	15:05	Qualifying - LMP3
Saturday, 22 April	15:30	Qualifying - LMP2 Pro-Am
Saturday, 22 April	15:55	Qualifying - LMP2
Sunday, 23 April	11:30	Race

== Free practice ==
- Only the fastest car in each class is shown.

Free Practice 1	Class	No.	Entrant	Time
Free Practice 1	LMP2	25	(Portugal) Algarve Pro Racing	1:30.055
Free Practice 1	LMP2 Pro/Am	37	(Switzerland) Cool Racing	1:29.811
Free Practice 1	LMP3	8	(Poland) Team Virage	1:35.509
Free Practice 1	LMGTE	60	(Italy) Iron Lynx	1:40.306
Free Practice 2	Class	No.	Entrant	Time
Free Practice 2	LMP2	43	(Poland) Inter Europol Competition	1:29.950
Free Practice 2	LMP2 Pro-Am	81	(United States) DragonSpeed USA	1:31.419
Free Practice 2	LMP3	12	(Germany) WTM by Rinaldi Racing	1:36.971
Free Practice 2	LMGTE	93	(Germany) Proton Competition	1:40.248

== Qualifying ==
Pole position winners in each class are marked in bold.

Pos	Class	No.	Team	Driver	Time	Gap	Grid
1	**LMP2**	**47**	**(Switzerland) Cool Racing**	**(France) Reshad de Gerus**	**1:29.396**	—	1
2	LMP2	25	(Portugal) Algarve Pro Racing	(Australia) James Allen	1:29.435	+0.039	2
3	LMP2	30	(France) Duqueine Team	(Switzerland) Neel Jani	1:29.593	+0.197	3
4	LMP2	22	(United States) United Autosports USA	(United Kingdom) Philip Hanson	1:29.693	+0.297	4
5	LMP2	65	(France) Panis Racing	(Netherlands) Job van Uitert	1:29.789	+0.393	5
6	LMP2	43	(Poland) Inter Europol Competition	(South Africa) Jonathan Aberdein	1:29.839	+0.443	6
7	LMP2	28	(France) IDEC Sport	(France) Paul-Loup Chatin	1:30.159	+0.763	7
8	**LMP2 Pro/Am**	**34**	**Racing Team Turkey**	**(Turkey) Salih Yoluç**	**1:30.947**	**+1.551**	8
9	LMP2 Pro/Am	99	(Germany) Proton Competition	(Italy) Giorgio Roda	1:31.267	+1.871	9
10	LMP2 Pro/Am	37	(Switzerland) Cool Racing	(Switzerland) Alexandre Coigny	1:32.838	+3.442	10
11	LMP2 Pro/Am	3	(Luxembourg) DKR Engineering	(Belgium) Tom van Rompuy	1:33.010	+3.614	11
12	LMP2 Pro/Am	24	(United Kingdom) Nielsen Racing	(United States) Rodrigo Sales	1:33.088	+3.692	12
13	LMP2 Pro/Am	83	(Italy) AF Corse	(France) François Perrodo	1:33.805	+4.409	13
14	LMP2 Pro/Am	21	(United States) United Autosports USA	(Brazil) Daniel Schneider	1:34.596	+5.200	14
15	LMP2 Pro/Am	20	(Portugal) Algarve Pro Racing	(United States) Fred Poordad	1:34.922	+5.526	15
16	**LMP3**	**17**	**(Switzerland) Cool Racing**	**(Argentina) Marcos Siebert**	**1:35.250**	**+5.854**	16
17	LMP3	13	(Poland) Inter Europol Competition	(United States) Wyatt Brichacek	1:35.562	+6.166	17
18	LMP2 Pro/Am	19	(Poland) Team Virage	(Denmark) Dennis Andersen	1:35.605	+6.209	21 (Note: The No. 19 Team Virage was penalised for impeding cars No. 23 and No. 3 in qualifying session. Stewards handed 3 place grid drop penalty for this offense.)
19	LMP3	31	(Switzerland) Racing Spirit of Léman	(France) Antoine Doquin	1:35.616	+6.220	18
20	LMP3	12	(Germany) WTM by Rinaldi Racing	(Colombia) Óscar Tunjo	1:35.758	+6.362	19
21	LMP3	15	(United Kingdom) RLR M Sport	(France) Gaël Julien	1:35.765	+6.369	20
22	LMP3	7	(United Kingdom) Nielsen Racing	(United Kingdom) Ryan Harper-Ellam	1:36.046	+6.650	22
23	LMP3	8	(Poland) Team Virage	(Portugal) Manuel Espírito Santo	1:36.449	+7.053	41 (Note: The No. 8 Team Virage was penalised for causing a red flag in qualifying session and lost all its laptimes.)
24	LMP3	10	(Italy) Eurointernational	(Netherlands) Glenn van Berlo	1:36.461	+7.065	23
25	LMP3	4	(Luxembourg) DKR Engineering	(Portugal) Pedro Perino	1:36.593	+7.197	24
26	LMP3	5	(United Kingdom) RLR M Sport	(Denmark) Valdemar Eriksen	1:36.764	+7.368	25
27	LMP3	35	(France) Ultimate	(France) Matthieu Lahaye	1:36.848	+7.452	26
28	LMP2 Pro/Am	23	(United States) United Autosports USA	(United States) James McGuire	1:36.966	+7.570	27
29	LMP2 Pro/Am	81	(United States) DragonSpeed USA	(Sweden) Henrik Hedman	1:37.185	+7.789	42 (Note: The No. 81 DragonSpeed USA was penalised for causing a red flag in qualifying session and lost all its laptimes.)
30	LMP3	11	(Italy) Eurointernational	(United Kingdom) Matthew Richard Bell	1:37.641	+8.245	28
31	**LMGTE**	**66**	**(United Kingdom) JMW Motorsport**	**(Singapore) Martin Berry**	**1:41.060**	**+11.664**	29
32	LMGTE	57	(Switzerland) Kessel Racing	(Japan) Takeshi Kimura	1:41.173	+11.777	30
33	LMGTE	16	(Germany) Proton Competition	(United States) Ryan Hardwick	1:41.188	+11.792	31
34	LMGTE	72	(United Kingdom) TF Sport	(France) Arnold Robin	1:41.315	+11.919	32
35	LMGTE	44	(Denmark) GMB Motorsport	(Denmark) Jens Reno Møller	1:41.360	+11.964	33
36	LMGTE	93	(Germany) Proton Competition	(Republic of Ireland) Michael Fassbender	1:41.499	+12.103	34
37	LMGTE	50	(Denmark) Formula Racing	(Denmark) Johnny Laursen	1:41.561	+12.165	35
38	LMGTE	77	(Germany) Proton Competition	(Germany) Christian Ried	1:42.157	+12.761	36
39	LMGTE	55	(Switzerland) Spirit of Race	(United Kingdom) Duncan Cameron	1:42.468	+13.072	37
40	LMGTE	51	(Italy) AF Corse	(Greece) Kriton Lentoudis	1:42.862	+13.466	38
41	LMGTE	60	(Italy) Iron Lynx	(Italy) Claudio Schiavoni	1:43.030	+13.634	39
42	LMGTE	95	(United Kingdom) TF Sport	(United Kingdom) John Hartshorne	1:43.968	+14.572	40

== Race ==
=== Race result ===
The minimum number of laps for classification (70% of overall winning car's distance) was 98 laps. Class winners are marked in bold.

Final Classification
Pos	Class	No.	Team	Drivers	Car	Tyres	Laps	Time/Gap
1	**LMP2 Pro/Am**	**34**	**Racing Team Turkey**	**(Turkey) Salih Yoluç (Republic of Ireland) Charlie Eastwood (Switzerland) Louis Delétraz**	**Oreca 07**	G	**140**	**4:01:14.646**
2	**LMP2**	**30**	**(France) Duqueine Team**	**(United Kingdom) Nicolas Pino (Austria) René Binder (Switzerland) Neel Jani**	**Oreca 07**	G	**140**	**+2.363**
3	LMP2 Pro/Am	83	(Italy) AF Corse	(France) François Perrodo (France) Matthieu Vaxivière (United Kingdom) Ben Barnicoat	Oreca 07	G	140	+12.995
4	LMP2 Pro/Am	37	(Switzerland) Cool Racing	(Switzerland) Alexandre Coigny (Denmark) Malthe Jakobsen (France) Nicolas Lapierre	Oreca 07	G	140	+43.757
5	LMP2	65	(France) Panis Racing	(Netherlands) Job van Uitert (Venezuela) Manuel Maldonado (Netherlands) Tijmen van der Helm	Oreca 07	G	140	+46.377
6	LMP2	28	(France) IDEC Sport	(France) Paul Lafargue (France) Paul-Loup Chatin (Germany) Laurents Hörr	Oreca 07	G	140	+1:05.613
7	LMP2	47	(Switzerland) Cool Racing	(Authorised Neutral Athletes) Vladislav Lomko (France) Reshad de Gerus (Argentina) José María López	Oreca 07	G	140	+1:17.282
8	LMP2	25	(Portugal) Algarve Pro Racing	(United States) Kyffin Simpson (Australia) James Allen (United Kingdom) Alexander Lynn	Oreca 07	G	139	+1 lap
9	LMP2 Pro/Am	24	(United Kingdom) Nielsen Racing	(United States) Rodrigo Sales (United Kingdom) Ben Hanley (Switzerland) Mathias Beche	Oreca 07	G	139	+1 lap (Note: The No. 24 Nielsen Racing was penalised for not slowing down in time during Full Course Yellow neutralisation and was handed 20 seconds time penalty.)
10	LMP2	22	(United States) United Autosports USA	(Japan) Marino Sato (United Kingdom) Philip Hanson (United Kingdom) Oliver Jarvis	Oreca 07	G	139	+1 lap
11	LMP2 Pro/Am	3	(Luxembourg) DKR Engineering	(Belgium) Tom van Rompuy (United Kingdom) Sebastián Álvarez (France) Nathanaël Berthon	Oreca 07	G	139	+1 lap
12	LMP2 Pro/Am	99	(Germany) Proton Competition	(Italy) Giorgio Roda (Germany) Jonas Ried (Italy) Gianmaria Bruni	Oreca 07	G	139	+1 lap
13	LMP2 Pro/Am	81	(United States) DragonSpeed USA	(Sweden) Henrik Hedman (Colombia) Sebastián Montoya (Colombia) Juan Pablo Montoya	Oreca 07	G	138	+2 laps
14	LMP2 Pro/Am	20	(Portugal) Algarve Pro Racing	(United States) Fred Poordad (France) Tristan Vautier (France) Jack Hawksworth	Oreca 07	G	138	+2 laps
15	LMP2 Pro/Am	19	(Poland) Team Virage	(Denmark) Dennis Andersen (Guatemala) Ian Rodríguez (Colombia) Tatiana Calderón	Oreca 07	G	138	+2 laps
16	LMP2 Pro/Am	21	(United States) United Autosports USA	(Brazil) Daniel Schneider (United Kingdom) Andrew Meyrick (Brazil) Nelson Piquet Jr.	Oreca 07	G	137	+3 laps
17	LMP2 Pro/Am	23	(United States) United Autosports USA	(United States) James McGuire (United Kingdom) Guy Smith (United Kingdom) Paul di Resta	Oreca 07	G	137	+3 laps
18	**LMP3**	**17**	**(Switzerland) Cool Racing**	**(France) Adrien Chila (Argentina) Marcos Siebert (Mexico) Alex García**	**Ligier JS P320**	M	**134**	**+6 laps**
19	LMP3	13	(Poland) Inter Europol Competition	(Portugal) Miguel Cristóvão (United Kingdom) Kai Askey (United States) Wyatt Brichacek	Ligier JS P320	M	134	+6 laps
20	LMP3	31	(Switzerland) Racing Spirit of Léman	(France) Jacques Wolff (France) Antoine Doquin (France) Fabien Michal	Ligier JS P320	M	134	+6 laps (Note: The No. 31 Racing Spirit of Léman was penalised for serving mandatory pitstop during Full Course Yellow neutralisation. The crew was penalised with 105 seconds time penalty.)
21	LMP3	11	(Italy) Eurointernational	(United Kingdom) Matthew Richard Bell (Canada) Adam Ali	Ligier JS P320	M	133	+7 laps
22	LMP3	7	(United Kingdom) Nielsen Racing	(United Kingdom) Anthony Wells (United Kingdom) Ryan Harper-Ellam	Ligier JS P320	M	133	+7 laps
23	LMP3	5	(United Kingdom) RLR M Sport	(Canada) James Dayson (Denmark) Valdemar Eriksen (United Kingdom) Jack Manchester	Ligier JS P320	M	133	+7 laps
24	LMP3	35	(France) Ultimate	(France) Eric Trouillet (France) Matthieu Lahaye (France) Jean-Baptiste Lahaye	Ligier JS P320	M	132	+8 laps
25	LMP3	8	(Poland) Team Virage	(Portugal) Manuel Espírito Santo (United Kingdom) Nick Adcock (Denmark) Michael Jensen	Ligier JS P320	M	131	+9 laps
26	**LMGTE**	**16**	**(Germany) Proton Competition**	**(United States) Ryan Hardwick (Canada) Zacharie Robichon (Belgium) Alessio Picariello**	**Porsche 911 RSR-19**	G	**131**	**+9 laps**
27	LMGTE	50	(Denmark) Formula Racing	(Denmark) Johnny Laursen (Denmark) Conrad Laursen (Denmark) Mikkel Mac	Ferrari 488 GTE Evo	G	131	+9 laps
28	LMGTE	66	(United Kingdom) JMW Motorsport	(Singapore) Martin Berry (United Kingdom) Lorcan Hanafin (United Kingdom) Jon Lancaster	Ferrari 488 GTE Evo	G	130	+10 laps
29	LMGTE	60	(Italy) Iron Lynx	(Italy) Claudio Schiavoni (Italy) Matteo Cressoni (Italy) Matteo Cairoli	Porsche 911 RSR-19	G	130	+10 laps
30	LMGTE	55	(Switzerland) Spirit of Race	(United Kingdom) Duncan Cameron (South Africa) David Perel (Republic of Ireland) Matt Griffin	Ferrari 488 GTE Evo	G	130	+10 laps
31	LMGTE	51	(Italy) AF Corse	(Greece) Kriton Lentoudis (Portugal) Rui Águas (Belgium) Ulysse de Pauw	Ferrari 488 GTE Evo	G	130	+10 laps
32	LMGTE	57	(Switzerland) Kessel Racing	(Japan) Takeshi Kimura (United States) Gregory Huffaker II (Denmark) Frederik Schandorff	Ferrari 488 GTE Evo	G	130	+10 laps
33	LMGTE	93	(Germany) Proton Competition	(Republic of Ireland) Michael Fassbender (Estonia) Martin Rump (Austria) Richard Lietz	Porsche 911 RSR-19	G	128	+12 laps
34	LMGTE	95	(United Kingdom) TF Sport	(United Kingdom) John Hartshorne (United Kingdom) Ben Tuck (United Kingdom) Jonathan Adam	Aston Martin Vantage AMR	G	128	+12 laps
35	LMP3	15	(United Kingdom) RLR M Sport	(Austria) Horst Felbermayr Jr (France) Gaël Julien (Poland) Mateusz Kaprzyk	Ligier JS P320	M	125	+15 laps
36	LMP3	4	(Luxembourg) DKR Engineering	(United Arab Emirates) Alexander Bukhantsov (United Kingdom) James Winslow (Portugal) Pedro Perino	Duqueine M30 - D08	M	113	+27 laps
Not classified
	LMP3	10	(Italy) Eurointernational	(United Kingdom) Nick Moss (Netherlands) Glenn van Berlo	Ligier JS P320	M	67	
	LMP2	43	(Poland) Inter Europol Competition	(Angola) Rui Andrade (United Kingdom) Olli Caldwell (South Africa) Jonathan Aberdein	Oreca 07	G	34	
	LMGTE	44	(Denmark) GMB Motorsport	(Denmark) Jens Reno Møller (Denmark) Gustav Birch (Denmark) Nicki Thiim	Aston Martin Vantage AMR	G	1	
	LMP3	12	(Germany) WTM by Rinaldi Racing	(Germany) Torsten Kratz (Germany) Leonard Weiss (Colombia) Óscar Tunjo	Duqueine M30 - D08	M	0	
	LMGTE	72	(United Kingdom) TF Sport	(France) Arnold Robin (France) Maxime Robin (France) Valentin Hasse-Clot	Aston Martin Vantage AMR	G	0	
	LMGTE	77	(Germany) Proton Competition	(Germany) Christian Ried (Italy) Giammarco Levorato (France) Julien Andlauer	Porsche 911 RSR-19	G	0	

=== Statistics ===
==== Fastest lap ====
Class	Driver	Team	Time	Lap
LMP2	(Authorised Neutral Athletes) Vladislav Lomko	(Switzerland) #47 Cool Racing	1:31.451	10
LMP2 Pro/Am	(Turkey) Salih Yoluç	#34 Racing Team Turkey	1:32.517	12
LMP3	(Argentina) Marcos Siebert	(Switzerland) #17 Cool Racing	1:38.481	105
LMGTE	(Belgium) Alessio Picariello	(Germany) #16 Proton Competition	1:41.371	99
