= Sebastián Álvarez =

Mexican racing driver

Sebastián Álvarez Arce
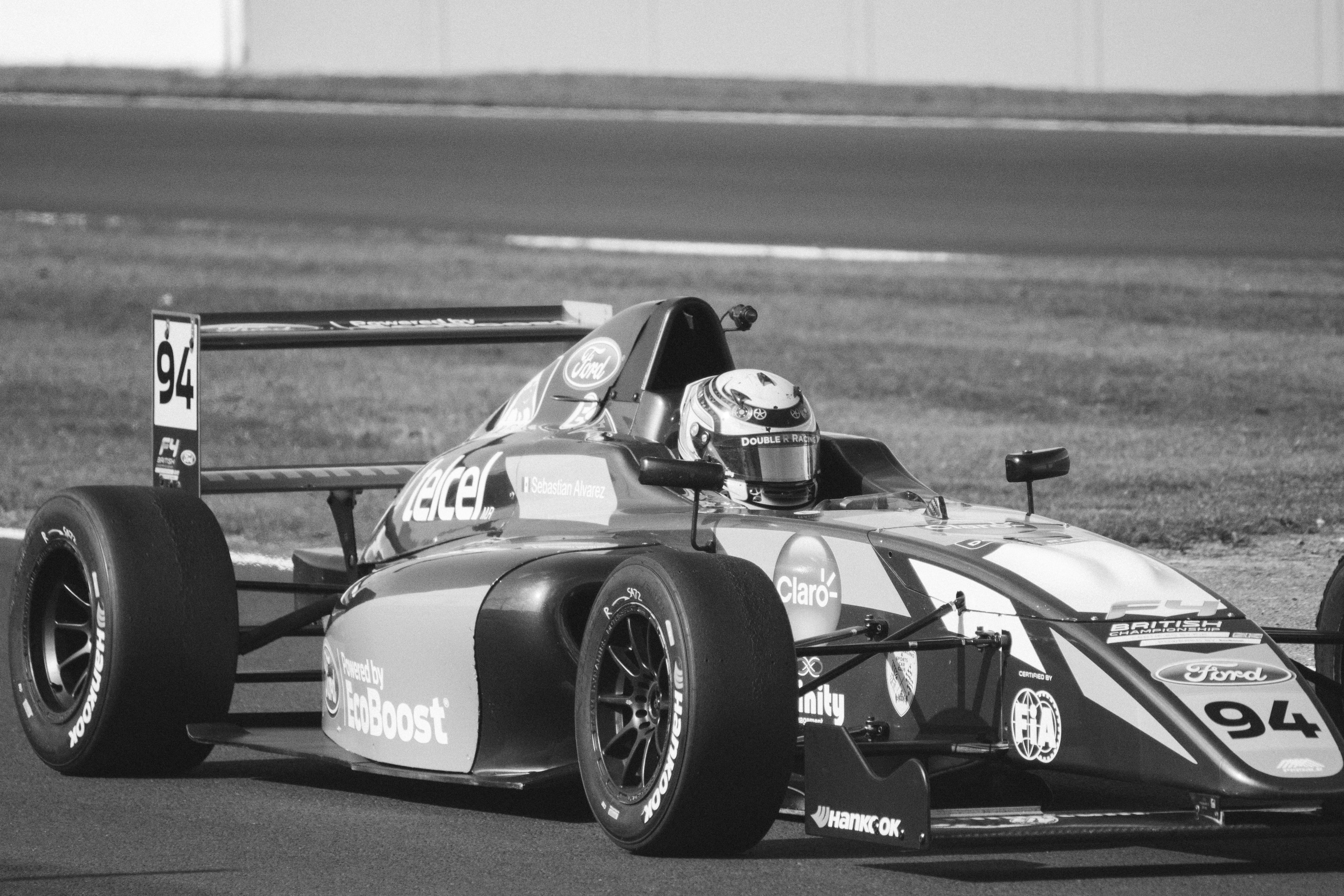
- Álvarez at Silverstone Circuit in 2018
- Nationality: (Mexico) Mexican
- Born: Sebastián Álvarez Arce; 8 July 2002 (age 24) Mexico City, Mexico

European Le Mans Series career
- Debut season: 2022
- Current team: Inter Europol Competition
- Categorisation: FIA Silver
- Car number: 13
- Former teams: DKR Engineering
- Starts: 6
- Wins: 0
- Podiums: 2
- Poles: 0
- Fastest laps: 0
- Best finish: 2 in 2022

Previous series
- 2018–2019 2021: F4 British Championship; GB3 Championship

Sebastián Álvarez Arce (born 8 July 2002) is a Mexican racing driver that is currently a member of the Escuderia Telmex driver programme and competes in the IMSA SportsCar Championship with Tower Motorsports and in the 24 Hours of Le Mans for IDEC Sport.

Álvarez has previously raced in the GB3 Championship with Hitech Grand Prix and he is the vice-champion of the 2019 F4 British Championship.

== Racing record ==
=== Racing career summary ===
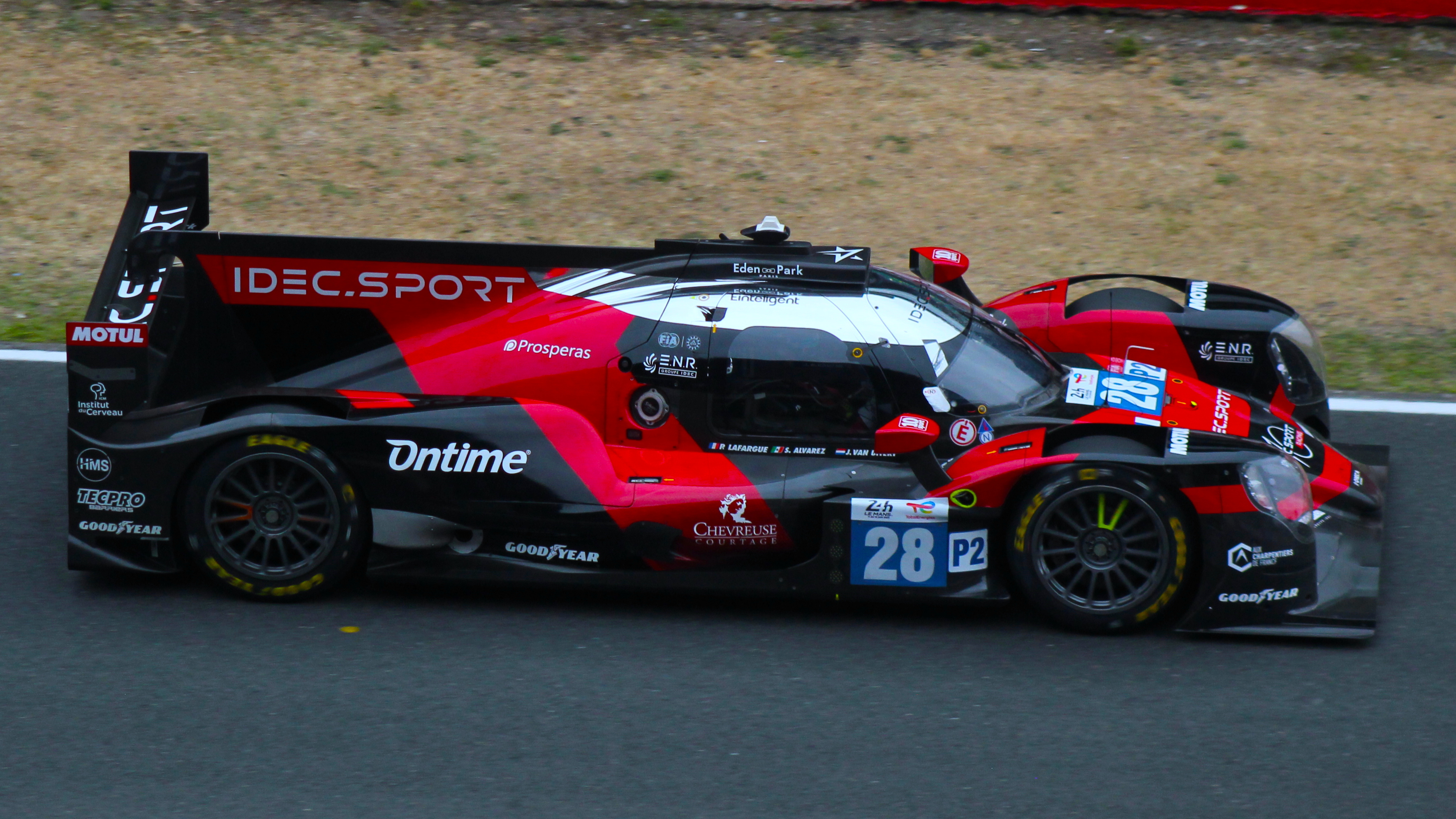
Álvarez's No. 28 car at the 2025 24 Hours of Le Mans

Season	Series	Team	Races	Wins	Poles	F/Laps	Podiums	Points	Position
2018	F4 British Championship	Double R Racing	30	0	1	0	0	38	12th
2019	F4 British Championship	Double R Racing	30	5	3	5	19	407	**2nd**
2021	GB3 Championship	Hitech Grand Prix	24	1	1	0	2	290	8th
2021	Euroformula Open Championship	Double R Racing	3	0	0	0	0	0	NC†
2022	Asian Le Mans Series - LMP3	DKR Engineering	4	1	4	2	1	41	6th
2022	European Le Mans Series - LMP3	DKR Engineering	6	0	0	0	2	60	**3rd**
2023	Asian Le Mans Series - LMP3	360 Racing	4	0	0	0	0	4	14th
2023	European Le Mans Series - LMP2 Pro/Am	DKR Engineering	6	0	0	0	0	32	12th
2023	IMSA SportsCar Championship - LMP3	MRS GT-Racing	1	0	0	0	0	0	NC†
2024	European Le Mans Series - LMP2	Inter Europol Competition	6	1	0	0	2	81	**2nd**
2024	IMSA SportsCar Championship - LMP2	DragonSpeed	1	0	0	0	0	543	32nd
2024	IMSA SportsCar Championship - LMP2	Tower Motorsports	1	0	0	0	0	543	32nd
2024	Ultimate Cup Series - Proto NP02	Cogemo Racing Team	1	0	0	0	0	0.5	58th
2025	Middle East Trophy - GT3	Team Motopark	1	0	0	0	0	0	NC†
2025	IMSA SportsCar Championship - LMP2	Tower Motorsports	5	0	0	0	1	1259	26th
2025	GT World Challenge Europe Endurance Cup	Comtoyou Racing	1	0	0	0	0	0	NC
2025	European Le Mans Series - LMP2	CLX Motorsport	1	0	0	0	0	8	17th
2026	IMSA SportsCar Championship - LMP2	Tower Motorsports	6	0	0	0	1	1666	13rd
2026	European Le Mans Series - LMP2	DKR Engineering	2	0	0	0	0	5	17th
2026	24 Hours of Le Mans - LMP2 Pro-Am	DKR Engineering	1	0	0	0	0	N/A	9th
2026	European Endurance Prototype Cup	Cogemo Racing Team	4	1	0	1	3	77.5*	4th*

=== Complete F4 British Championship results ===
(key) (Races in bold indicate pole position) (Races in italics indicate fastest lap)

Year	Team	1	2	3	4	5	6	7	8	9	10	11	12	13	14	15	16	17	18	19	20	21	22	23	24	25	26	27	28	29	30	Pos	Points
2018	Double R Racing	BRI; 1; 11	BRI; 2 Ret	BRI; 3 Ret	DON; 1; 9	DON; 2; 9	DON; 3 Ret	THR; 1 Ret	THR; 2; 8	THR; 3; 14	OUL; 1; 13	OUL; 2; 12	OUL; 3; 10	CRO; 1; 13	CRO; 2; 11	CRO; 3; 9	SNE; 1; 6	SNE; 2; 9	SNE; 3; 11	ROC; 1; 11	ROC; 2; 9	ROC; 3; 9	KNO; 1; 11	KNO; 2; 7	KNO; 3 Ret	SIL; 1; 11	SIL; 2 Ret	SIL; 3; 7	BHGP; 1; 10	BHGP; 2; 11	BHGP; 3 Ret	12th	38
2019	Double R Racing	BHI; 1; 2	BHI; 2; 2	**BHI**; **3**; 1	DON; 1; 9	DON; 2; 5	DON; 3; 2	THR1; 1; 5	THR1; 2; 2	THR1; 3; 3	CRO; 1; 5	CRO; 2; 2	CRO; 3 Ret	OUL; 1; 5	OUL; 2; 9	OUL; 3; 3	**SNE**; **1**; 1	SNE; 2; 11	**SNE**; **3**; 1	THR2; 1; 2	THR2; 2; 3	THR2; 3; 5	KNO; 1; 3	KNO; 2; 2	KNO; 3; 2	SIL; 1; 2	SIL; 2; 1	SIL; 3 Ret	BHGP; 1; 3	BHGP; 2; 1	BHGP; 3 Ret	2nd	407

=== Complete GB3 Championship results ===
(key) (Races in bold indicate pole position) (Races in italics indicate fastest lap)

Year	Team	1	2	3	4	5	6	7	8	9	10	11	12	13	14	15	16	17	18	19	20	21	22	23	24	DC	Points
2021	Hitech Grand Prix	BRH; 1; 11	BRH; 2; 8	BRH; 3 Ret	SIL1; 1; 6	SIL1; 2; 12	SIL1; 3; 8^{1}	DON1; 1; 10	DON1; 2; 9	DON1; 3; 9	SPA; 1; 7	SPA; 2; 6	SPA; 3; 15	SNE; 1; 4	**SNE**; **2**; 1	SNE; 3; 4^{6}	SIL2; 1; 16	SIL2; 2; 16	SIL2; 3; 3^{5}	OUL; 1; 9	OUL; 2; 14	OUL; 3; 5^{1}	DON2; 1 Ret	DON2; 2; 8	DON2; 3; 7^{11}	8th	290

=== Complete Euroformula Open Championship results ===
(key) (Races in bold indicate pole position) (Races in italics indicate fastest lap)

Year	Team	1	2	3	4	5	6	7	8	9	10	11	12	13	14	15	16	17	18	19	20	21	22	23	24	DC	Points
2021	Double R Racing	POR; 1	POR; 2	POR; 3	LEC; 1	LEC; 2	LEC; 3	SPA; 1	SPA; 2	SPA; 3	HUN; 1	HUN; 2	HUN; 3	IMO; 1	IMO; 2	IMO; 3	RBR; 1	RBR; 2	RBR; 3	MNZ; 1	MNZ; 2	MNZ; 3	CAT; 1; 11	CAT; 2; 10	CAT; 3; 10	NC	—

=== Complete European Le Mans Series results ===
(key) (Races in bold indicate pole position; results in italics indicate fastest lap)

Year	Entrant	Class	Chassis	Engine	1	2	3	4	5	6	Rank	Points
2022	DKR Engineering	LMP3	Duqueine M30 - D08	Nissan VK56DE 5.6 L V8	LEC; 9	IMO; 5	MNZ; 8	CAT; 2	SPA; 2	ALG; 6	3rd	60
2023	DKR Engineering	LMP2 Pro-Am	Oreca 07	Gibson GK428 4.2 L V8	CAT; 11	LEC; 9	ARA; 8	SPA; 8	ALG; 8	POR; 6	12th	32
2024	Inter Europol Competition	LMP2	Oreca 07	Gibson GK428 4.2 L V8	CAT; 6	LEC; 1	IMO; 3	SPA; 2	MUG; 8	ALG; 4	2nd	81
2025	CLX Motorsport	LMP2	Oreca 07	Gibson GK428 4.2 L V8	CAT	LEC	IMO	SPA; 6	SIL	ALG	17th	8
2026	DKR Engineering	LMP2 Pro-Am	Oreca 07	Gibson GK428 4.2 L V8	CAT; 8	LEC; 10	IMO	SPA	SIL	ALG	17th	5

^{*} Season still in progress.

=== Complete Asian Le Mans Series results ===
(key) (Races in bold indicate pole position) (Races in italics indicate fastest lap)

Year	Team	Class	Car	Engine	1	2	3	4	Pos.	Points
2022	DKR Engineering	LMP3	Duqueine M30 - D08	Nissan VK56DE 5.6 L V8	**DUB**; **1** Ret	**DUB**; **2**; 7	**ABU**; **1**; 1	**ABU**; **2**; 7	6th	41
2023	360 Racing	LMP3	Ligier JS P320	Nissan VK56DE 5.6 L V8	DUB; 1; 12	DUB; 2; 13	ABU; 1 Ret	ABU; 2; 8	14th	4

=== Complete WeatherTech SportsCar Championship results ===
(key) (Races in bold indicate pole position; races in italics indicate fastest lap)

Year	Entrant	Class	Make	Engine	1	2	3	4	5	6	7	Rank	Points	Ref
2023	MRS GT-Racing	LMP3	Ligier JS P320	Nissan VK56DE 5.6 L V8	DAY; 8†	SEB	WGL	MOS	ELK	IMS	PET	NC†	0†	
2024	DragonSpeed USA	LMP2	Oreca 07	Gibson GK428 4.2 L V8	DAY; 7	SEB	WGL	MOS	ELK	IMS		32nd	543	
2024	Tower Motorsports	LMP2	Oreca 07	Gibson GK428 4.2 L V8							ATL; 5	32nd	543	
2025	Tower Motorsports	LMP2	Oreca 07	Gibson GK428 4.2 L V8	DAY; 12	SEB; 2	WGL; 9	MOS	ELK	IMS; 7	ATL; 12	26th	1259	
2026	Tower Motorsports	LMP2	Oreca 07	Gibson GK428 4.2 L V8	DAY; 8	SEB; 3	WGL; 7	MOS; 8	ELK; 5	IMS	PET; 4	13rd	1666	

^{†} Points only counted towards the Michelin Endurance Cup, and not the overall LMP3 Championship.

=== Complete 24 Hours of Le Mans results ===
Year	Team	Co-Drivers	Car	Class	Laps	Pos.	Class Pos.
2025	(France) IDEC Sport	(France) Paul Lafargue (Netherlands) Job van Uitert	Oreca 07-Gibson	LMP2	308	DNF	DNF
2026	(Luxembourg) DKR Engineering	(Canada) John Farano (Netherlands) Renger van der Zande	Oreca 07-Gibson	LMP2	344	31st	17th
2026	(Luxembourg) DKR Engineering	(Canada) John Farano (Netherlands) Renger van der Zande	Oreca 07-Gibson	LMP2 Pro-Am	344	31st	9th
