= 2022 4 Hours of Spa-Francorchamps =

Layout of the Circuit de Spa-Francorchamps

The 2022 4 Hours of Spa-Francorchamps was an endurance sportscar racing event that was held on 25 September 2022, as the fifth round of the 2022 European Le Mans Series.

In LMP2, the race was won by the #22 United Autosports run Oreca 07-Gibson, driven by Tom Gamble, Duncan Tappy and Philip Hanson.

In LMP3, the race was won by the #13 Inter Europol Competition run Ligier JS P320, driven by Charles Crews, Nico Pino and Guilherme Oliveira.

In LMGTE, the race was won by the #57 Kessel Racing run Ferrari 488 GTE Evo, driven by Conrad Grunewald, Frederik Schandorff and Mikkel Jensen.

== Qualifying ==
=== Qualifying Result ===
Pole position in each class are marked in bold.

| Pos | Class | No. | Team | Time | Grid |
|---|---|---|---|---|---|
| 1 | **LMP2** | **37** | **(Switzerland) Cool Racing** | **2:03.544** | 1 |
| 2 | LMP2 | 28 | (France) IDEC Sport | 2:03.851 | 2 |
| 3 | LMP2 | 65 | (France) Panis Racing | 2:04.172 | 3 |
| 4 | LMP2 | 22 | (United Kingdom) United Autosports | 2:04.175 | 4 |
| 5 | **LMP2 Pro-Am** | **34** | **Racing Team Turkey** | **2:04.282** | 5 |
| 6 | LMP2 | 21 | (Belgium) Mühlner Motorsport | 2:04.443 | 6 |
| 7 | LMP2 Pro-Am | 88 | (Italy) AF Corse | 2:04.502 | 7 |
| 8 | LMP2 | 9 | (Italy) Prema Racing | 2:04.545 | 8 |
| 9 | LMP2 | 19 | (Portugal) Algarve Pro Racing | 2:04.842 | 9 |
| 10 | LMP2 Pro-Am | 31 | (France) TDS Racing x Vaillante | 2:04.865 | 10 |
| 11 | LMP2 Pro-Am | 47 | (Portugal) Algarve Pro Racing | 2:04.891 | 11 |
| 12 | LMP2 Pro-Am | 51 | (Poland) Team Virage | 2:04.970 | 12 |
| 13 | LMP2 | 30 | (France) Duqueine Team | 2:05.560 | 13 |
| 14 | LMP2 Pro-Am | 24 | (United Kingdom) Nielsen Racing | 2:06.365 | 14 |
| 15 | LMP2 | 35 | (United Kingdom) BHK Motorsport | 2:07.170 | 15 |
| 16 | **LMP3** | **17** | **(Switzerland) Cool Racing** | **2:11.062** | 16 |
| 17 | LMP3 | 3 | (United Kingdom) United Autosports | 2:11.922 | 17 |
| 18 | LMP3 | 13 | (Poland) Inter Europol Competition | 2:12.233 | 18 |
| 19 | LMP3 | 4 | (Luxembourg) DKR Engineering | 2:12.346 | 19 |
| 20 | LMP3 | 2 | (United Kingdom) United Autosports | 2:12.391 | 20 |
| 21 | LMP3 | 10 | (Italy) EuroInternational | 2:12.437 | 21 |
| 22 | LMP3 | 15 | (United Kingdom) RLR Msport | 2:12.443 | 22 |
| 23 | LMP3 | 5 | (United Kingdom) RLR Msport | 2:12.913 | 23 |
| 24 | LMP3 | 27 | (Switzerland) Cool Racing | 2:13.092 | 24 |
| 25 | LMP3 | 6 | (United Kingdom) 360 Racing | 2:13.128 | 25 |
| 26 | LMP3 | 11 | (Italy) EuroInternational | 2:13.276 | 26 |
| 27 | LMP3 | 7 | (United Kingdom) Nielsen Racing | 2:13.369 | 27 |
| 28 | LMP3 | 14 | (Poland) Inter Europol Competition | 2:13.768 | 28 |
| 29 | **LMGTE** | **57** | **(Switzerland) Kessel Racing** | **2:17.074** | 29 |
| 30 | LMGTE | 69 | Oman Racing with TF Sport | 2:18.185 | 30 |
| 31 | LMGTE | 32 | (Germany) Rinaldi Racing | 2:18.297 | 31 |
| 32 | LMGTE | 83 | (Italy) Iron Lynx | 2:18.333 | 32 |
| 33 | LMGTE | 77 | (Germany) Proton Competition | 2:18.667 | 33 |
| 34 | LMGTE | 18 | (Hong Kong) Absolute Racing | 2:19.502 | 34 |
| 35 | LMGTE | 66 | (United Kingdom) JMW Motorsport | 2:19.741 | 35 |
| 36 | LMGTE | 60 | (Italy) Iron Lynx | 2:20.580 | 36 |
| 37 | LMGTE | 93 | (Germany) Proton Competition | 2:20.629 | 37 |
| 38 | LMGTE | 95 | Oman Racing with TF Sport | 2:20.696 | 38 |
| 39 | LMP2 | 43 | (Poland) Inter Europol Competition | No Time | 39 |

== Race ==
=== Race Result ===
Class winners are marked in bold. - Cars failing to complete 70% of the winner's distance are marked as Not Classified (NC).

| Pos. | Class | No. | Team | Drivers | Chassis | Tyre | Laps | Time/Retired |
| Pos. | Class | No. | Team | Drivers | Engine | Tyre | Laps | Time/Retired |
|---|---|---|---|---|---|---|---|---|
| 1 | **LMP2** | **22** | **(United Kingdom) United Autosports** | **(United Kingdom) Philip Hanson** **(United Kingdom) Tom Gamble** **(United Kingdom) Duncan Tappy** | **Oreca 07** | G | **97** | **4:00:31.833‡** |
| 1 | **LMP2** | **22** | **(United Kingdom) United Autosports** | **(United Kingdom) Philip Hanson** **(United Kingdom) Tom Gamble** **(United Kingdom) Duncan Tappy** | **Gibson GK428 4.2 L V8** | G | **97** | **4:00:31.833‡** |
| 2 | LMP2 | 43 | (Poland) Inter Europol Competition | (Switzerland) Fabio Scherer (Brazil) Pietro Fittipaldi (Denmark) David Heinemeier Hansson | Oreca 07 | G | 97 | +23.508 s |
| 2 | LMP2 | 43 | (Poland) Inter Europol Competition | (Switzerland) Fabio Scherer (Brazil) Pietro Fittipaldi (Denmark) David Heinemeier Hansson | Gibson GK428 4.2 L V8 | G | 97 | +23.508 s |
| 3 | LMP2 | 9 | (Italy) Prema Racing | (United States) Juan Manuel Correa (Switzerland) Louis Delétraz (Austria) Ferdinand Habsburg | Oreca 07 | G | 97 | +24.661 s |
| 3 | LMP2 | 9 | (Italy) Prema Racing | (United States) Juan Manuel Correa (Switzerland) Louis Delétraz (Austria) Ferdinand Habsburg | Gibson GK428 4.2 L V8 | G | 97 | +24.661 s |
| 4 | LMP2 | 65 | (France) Panis Racing | (France) Julien Canal (France) Nico Jamin (Netherlands) Job van Uitert | Oreca 07 | G | 97 | +35.904 s |
| 4 | LMP2 | 65 | (France) Panis Racing | (France) Julien Canal (France) Nico Jamin (Netherlands) Job van Uitert | Gibson GK428 4.2 L V8 | G | 97 | +35.904 s |
| 5 | LMP2 | 37 | (Switzerland) Cool Racing | (France) Nicolas Lapierre (Germany) Niklas Krütten (China) Ye Yifei | Oreca 07 | G | 97 | +48.995 s |
| 5 | LMP2 | 37 | (Switzerland) Cool Racing | (France) Nicolas Lapierre (Germany) Niklas Krütten (China) Ye Yifei | Gibson GK428 4.2 L V8 | G | 97 | +48.995 s |
| 6 | **LMP2 Pro-Am** | **34** | **Racing Team Turkey** | **(Turkey) Salih Yoluç** **(Republic of Ireland) Charlie Eastwood** **(United Kingdom) Will Stevens** | **Oreca 07** | G | **97** | **+1:04.217** |
| 6 | **LMP2 Pro-Am** | **34** | **Racing Team Turkey** | **(Turkey) Salih Yoluç** **(Republic of Ireland) Charlie Eastwood** **(United Kingdom) Will Stevens** | **Gibson GK428 4.2 L V8** | G | **97** | **+1:04.217** |
| 7 | LMP2 Pro-Am | 88 | (Italy) AF Corse | (France) François Perrodo (Denmark) Nicklas Nielsen (Italy) Alessio Rovera | Oreca 07 | G | 97 | +1:04.259 |
| 7 | LMP2 Pro-Am | 88 | (Italy) AF Corse | (France) François Perrodo (Denmark) Nicklas Nielsen (Italy) Alessio Rovera | Gibson GK428 4.2 L V8 | G | 97 | +1:04.259 |
| 8 | LMP2 | 19 | (Portugal) Algarve Pro Racing | (Romania) Filip Ugran (Netherlands) Bent Viscaal | Oreca 07 | G | 97 | +1:35.290 |
| 8 | LMP2 | 19 | (Portugal) Algarve Pro Racing | (Romania) Filip Ugran (Netherlands) Bent Viscaal | Gibson GK428 4.2 L V8 | G | 97 | +1:35.290 |
| 9 | LMP2 | 30 | (France) Duqueine Team | (Mexico) Memo Rojas (France) Mathieu de Barbuat (United Kingdom) Richard Bradley | Oreca 07 | G | 97 | +1:47.745 |
| 9 | LMP2 | 30 | (France) Duqueine Team | (Mexico) Memo Rojas (France) Mathieu de Barbuat (United Kingdom) Richard Bradley | Gibson GK428 4.2 L V8 | G | 97 | +1:47.745 |
| 10 | LMP2 Pro-Am | 47 | (Portugal) Algarve Pro Racing | (United States) John Falb (Australia) James Allen (Australia) Alex Peroni | Oreca 07 | G | 97 | +2:17.167 |
| 10 | LMP2 Pro-Am | 47 | (Portugal) Algarve Pro Racing | (United States) John Falb (Australia) James Allen (Australia) Alex Peroni | Gibson GK428 4.2 L V8 | G | 97 | +2:17.167 |
| 11 | LMP2 Pro-Am | 24 | (United Kingdom) Nielsen Racing | (United States) Rodrigo Sales (United Kingdom) Matt Bell (United Kingdom) Ben Hanley | Oreca 07 | G | 96 | +1 Lap |
| 11 | LMP2 Pro-Am | 24 | (United Kingdom) Nielsen Racing | (United States) Rodrigo Sales (United Kingdom) Matt Bell (United Kingdom) Ben Hanley | Gibson GK428 4.2 L V8 | G | 96 | +1 Lap |
| 12 | LMP2 Pro-Am | 31 | (France) TDS Racing x Vaillante | (France) Philippe Cimadomo (Switzerland) Mathias Beche (Netherlands) Tijmen van der Helm | Oreca 07 | G | 96 | +1 Lap |
| 12 | LMP2 Pro-Am | 31 | (France) TDS Racing x Vaillante | (France) Philippe Cimadomo (Switzerland) Mathias Beche (Netherlands) Tijmen van der Helm | Gibson GK428 4.2 L V8 | G | 96 | +1 Lap |
| 13 | LMP2 | 35 | (United Kingdom) BHK Motorsport | (Italy) Francesco Dracone (Italy) Sergio Campana (Germany) Markus Pommer | Oreca 07 | G | 95 | +2 Laps |
| 13 | LMP2 | 35 | (United Kingdom) BHK Motorsport | (Italy) Francesco Dracone (Italy) Sergio Campana (Germany) Markus Pommer | Gibson GK428 4.2 L V8 | G | 95 | +2 Laps |
| 14 | **LMP3** | **13** | **(Poland) Inter Europol Competition** | **(United States) Charles Crews** **(Chile) Nico Pino** **(Portugal) Guilherme Oliveira** | **Ligier JS P320** | MI | **93** | **+4 Laps‡** |
| 14 | **LMP3** | **13** | **(Poland) Inter Europol Competition** | **(United States) Charles Crews** **(Chile) Nico Pino** **(Portugal) Guilherme Oliveira** | **Nissan VK56DE 5.6 L V8** | MI | **93** | **+4 Laps‡** |
| 15 | LMP2 Pro-Am | 51 | (Poland) Team Virage | (United States) Rob Hodes (France) Gabriel Aubry (Guatemala) Ian Rodríguez | Oreca 07 | G | 93 | +4 Laps |
| 15 | LMP2 Pro-Am | 51 | (Poland) Team Virage | (United States) Rob Hodes (France) Gabriel Aubry (Guatemala) Ian Rodríguez | Gibson GK428 4.2 L V8 | G | 93 | +4 Laps |
| 16 | LMP3 | 4 | (Luxembourg) DKR Engineering | (Mexico) Sebastián Álvarez (United Arab Emirates) Alexander Bukhantsov (Belgium) Tom van Rompuy | Duqueine M30 – D08 | MI | 93 | +4 Laps |
| 16 | LMP3 | 4 | (Luxembourg) DKR Engineering | (Mexico) Sebastián Álvarez (United Arab Emirates) Alexander Bukhantsov (Belgium) Tom van Rompuy | Nissan VK56DE 5.6 L V8 | MI | 93 | +4 Laps |
| 17 | LMP3 | 7 | (United Kingdom) Nielsen Racing | (United Kingdom) Anthony Wells (United Kingdom) James Littlejohn | Ligier JS P320 | MI | 93 | +4 Laps |
| 17 | LMP3 | 7 | (United Kingdom) Nielsen Racing | (United Kingdom) Anthony Wells (United Kingdom) James Littlejohn | Nissan VK56DE 5.6 L V8 | MI | 93 | +4 Laps |
| 18 | LMP3 | 27 | (Switzerland) Cool Racing | (Switzerland) Nicolas Maulini (France) Jean-Ludovic Foubert (France) Antoine Doquin | Ligier JS P320 | MI | 92 | +5 Laps |
| 18 | LMP3 | 27 | (Switzerland) Cool Racing | (Switzerland) Nicolas Maulini (France) Jean-Ludovic Foubert (France) Antoine Doquin | Nissan VK56DE 5.6 L V8 | MI | 92 | +5 Laps |
| 19 | LMP3 | 3 | (United Kingdom) United Autosports | (Netherlands) Kay van Berlo (United States) James McGuire (United Kingdom) Andrew Bentley | Ligier JS P320 | MI | 92 | +5 Laps |
| 19 | LMP3 | 3 | (United Kingdom) United Autosports | (Netherlands) Kay van Berlo (United States) James McGuire (United Kingdom) Andrew Bentley | Nissan VK56DE 5.6 L V8 | MI | 92 | +5 Laps |
| 20 | LMP3 | 11 | (United States) Eurointernational | (Netherlands) Max Koebolt (Spain) Santiago Concepción Serrano (Switzerland) Jérôme de Sadeleer | Ligier JS P320 | MI | 92 | +5 Laps |
| 20 | LMP3 | 11 | (United States) Eurointernational | (Netherlands) Max Koebolt (Spain) Santiago Concepción Serrano (Switzerland) Jérôme de Sadeleer | Nissan VK56DE 5.6 L V8 | MI | 92 | +5 Laps |
| 21 | **LMGTE** | **57** | **(Switzerland) Kessel Racing** | **(United States) Conrad Grunewald** **(Denmark) Frederik Schandorff** **(Denmark) Mikkel Jensen** | **Ferrari 488 GTE Evo** | G | **92** | **+5 Laps‡** |
| 21 | **LMGTE** | **57** | **(Switzerland) Kessel Racing** | **(United States) Conrad Grunewald** **(Denmark) Frederik Schandorff** **(Denmark) Mikkel Jensen** | **Ferrari F154CB 3.9 L Turbo V8** | G | **92** | **+5 Laps‡** |
| 22 | LMP3 | 6 | (United Kingdom) 360 Racing | (United Kingdom) Terrence Woodward (United Kingdom) Ross Kaiser (United Kingdom) Mark Richards | Ligier JS P320 | MI | 92 | +5 Laps |
| 22 | LMP3 | 6 | (United Kingdom) 360 Racing | (United Kingdom) Terrence Woodward (United Kingdom) Ross Kaiser (United Kingdom) Mark Richards | Nissan VK56DE 5.6 L V8 | MI | 92 | +5 Laps |
| 23 | LMGTE | 83 | (Italy) Iron Lynx | (France) Doriane Pin (Denmark) Michelle Gatting (Belgium) Sarah Bovy | Ferrari 488 GTE Evo | G | 92 | +5 Laps |
| 23 | LMGTE | 83 | (Italy) Iron Lynx | (France) Doriane Pin (Denmark) Michelle Gatting (Belgium) Sarah Bovy | Ferrari F154CB 3.9 L Turbo V8 | G | 92 | +5 Laps |
| 24 | LMGTE | 18 | (Hong Kong) Absolute Racing | (Indonesia) Andrew Haryanto (Estonia) Martin Rump (Belgium) Alessio Picariello | Porsche 911 RSR-19 | G | 91 | +6 Laps |
| 24 | LMGTE | 18 | (Hong Kong) Absolute Racing | (Indonesia) Andrew Haryanto (Estonia) Martin Rump (Belgium) Alessio Picariello | Porsche 4.2 L Flat-6 | G | 91 | +6 Laps |
| 25 | LMGTE | 69 | Oman Racing with TF Sport | (Oman) Ahmad Al Harthy (Denmark) Marco Sørensen (United Kingdom) Sam De Haan | Aston Martin Vantage AMR | G | 91 | +6 Laps |
| 25 | LMGTE | 69 | Oman Racing with TF Sport | (Oman) Ahmad Al Harthy (Denmark) Marco Sørensen (United Kingdom) Sam De Haan | Aston Martin 4.0 L Turbo V8 | G | 91 | +6 Laps |
| 26 | LMGTE | 77 | (Germany) Proton Competition | (Germany) Christian Ried (Italy) Lorenzo Ferrari (Italy) Gianmaria Bruni | Porsche 911 RSR-19 | G | 91 | +6 Laps |
| 26 | LMGTE | 77 | (Germany) Proton Competition | (Germany) Christian Ried (Italy) Lorenzo Ferrari (Italy) Gianmaria Bruni | Porsche 4.2 L Flat-6 | G | 91 | +6 Laps |
| 27 | LMP3 | 14 | (Poland) Inter Europol Competition | (France) Noam Abramczyk (Poland) Mateusz Kaprzyk (Canada) James Dayson | Ligier JS P320 | MI | 91 | +6 Laps |
| 27 | LMP3 | 14 | (Poland) Inter Europol Competition | (France) Noam Abramczyk (Poland) Mateusz Kaprzyk (Canada) James Dayson | Nissan VK56DE 5.6 L V8 | MI | 91 | +6 Laps |
| 28 | LMGTE | 66 | (United Kingdom) JMW Motorsport | (Italy) Giacorno Petrobelli (Singapore) Sean Hudspeth (New Zealand) Matthew Payne | Ferrari 488 GTE Evo | G | 91 | +6 Laps |
| 28 | LMGTE | 66 | (United Kingdom) JMW Motorsport | (Italy) Giacorno Petrobelli (Singapore) Sean Hudspeth (New Zealand) Matthew Payne | Ferrari F154CB 3.9 L Turbo V8 | G | 91 | +6 Laps |
| 29 | LMGTE | 93 | (Germany) Proton Competition | (Republic of Ireland) Michael Fassbender (Canada) Zacharie Robichon (Austria) Richard Lietz | Porsche 911 RSR-19 | G | 90 | +7 Laps |
| 29 | LMGTE | 93 | (Germany) Proton Competition | (Republic of Ireland) Michael Fassbender (Canada) Zacharie Robichon (Austria) Richard Lietz | Porsche 4.2 L Flat-6 | G | 90 | +7 Laps |
| 30 | LMP3 | 5 | (United Kingdom) RLR MSport | (Denmark) Michael Jensen (United Kingdom) Nick Adcock (United Kingdom) Alex Kapadia | Ligier JS P320 | MI | 90 | +7 Laps |
| 30 | LMP3 | 5 | (United Kingdom) RLR MSport | (Denmark) Michael Jensen (United Kingdom) Nick Adcock (United Kingdom) Alex Kapadia | Nissan VK56DE 5.6 L V8 | MI | 90 | +7 Laps |
| 31 | LMGTE | 95 | Oman Racing with TF Sport | (United Kingdom) John Hartshorne (Portugal) Henrique Chaves (United Kingdom) Jonathan Adam | Aston Martin Vantage AMR | G | 90 | +7 Laps |
| 31 | LMGTE | 95 | Oman Racing with TF Sport | (United Kingdom) John Hartshorne (Portugal) Henrique Chaves (United Kingdom) Jonathan Adam | Aston Martin 4.0 L Turbo V8 | G | 90 | +7 Laps |
| 32 | LMGTE | 60 | (Italy) Iron Lynx | (Italy) Claudio Schiavoni (Italy) Matteo Cressoni (Italy) Davide Rigon | Ferrari 488 GTE Evo | G | 90 | +7 Laps |
| 32 | LMGTE | 60 | (Italy) Iron Lynx | (Italy) Claudio Schiavoni (Italy) Matteo Cressoni (Italy) Davide Rigon | Ferrari F154CB 3.9 L Turbo V8 | G | 90 | +7 Laps |
| 33 | LMGTE | 32 | (Germany) Rinaldi Racing | (Germany) Pierre Ehret (Argentina) Nicolás Varrone (Italy) Diego Alessi | Ferrari 488 GTE Evo | G | 87 | +10 Laps |
| 33 | LMGTE | 32 | (Germany) Rinaldi Racing | (Germany) Pierre Ehret (Argentina) Nicolás Varrone (Italy) Diego Alessi | Ferrari F154CB 3.9 L Turbo V8 | G | 87 | +10 Laps |
| 34 | LMP3 | 10 | (United States) Eurointernational | (Spain) Xavier Lloveras (Portugal) Miguel Cristóvão | Ligier JS P320 | MI | 70 | +27 Laps |
| 34 | LMP3 | 10 | (United States) Eurointernational | (Spain) Xavier Lloveras (Portugal) Miguel Cristóvão | Nissan VK56DE 5.6 L V8 | MI | 70 | +27 Laps |
| DNF | LMP2 | 21 | (Belgium) Mühlner Motorsport | (Liechtenstein) Matthias Kaiser (France) Thomas Laurent (Belgium) Ugo de Wilde | Oreca 07 | G | 72 | Retired |
| DNF | LMP2 | 21 | (Belgium) Mühlner Motorsport | (Liechtenstein) Matthias Kaiser (France) Thomas Laurent (Belgium) Ugo de Wilde | Gibson GK428 4.2 L V8 | G | 72 | Retired |
| DNF | LMP3 | 2 | (United Kingdom) United Autosports | (United Kingdom) Bailey Voisin (United Kingdom) Josh Caygill (Germany) Finn Gehrsitz | Ligier JS P320 | MI | 71 | Did not finish |
| DNF | LMP3 | 2 | (United Kingdom) United Autosports | (United Kingdom) Bailey Voisin (United Kingdom) Josh Caygill (Germany) Finn Gehrsitz | Nissan VK56DE 5.6 L V8 | MI | 71 | Did not finish |
| DNF | LMP3 | 15 | (United Kingdom) RLR MSport | (Austria) Horst Felbemayr Jr. (Germany) Valentino Catalano (United States) Austin McCusker | Ligier JS P320 | MI | 66 | Retired |
| DNF | LMP3 | 15 | (United Kingdom) RLR MSport | (Austria) Horst Felbemayr Jr. (Germany) Valentino Catalano (United States) Austin McCusker | Nissan VK56DE 5.6 L V8 | MI | 66 | Retired |
| DNF | LMP2 | 28 | (France) IDEC Sport | (France) Paul Lafargue (France) Paul-Loup Chatin (France) Patrick Pilet | Oreca 07 | G | 46 | Did not finish |
| DNF | LMP2 | 28 | (France) IDEC Sport | (France) Paul Lafargue (France) Paul-Loup Chatin (France) Patrick Pilet | Gibson GK428 4.2 L V8 | G | 46 | Did not finish |
| DNF | LMP3 | 17 | (Switzerland) Cool Racing | (United States) Maurice Smith (United Kingdom) Mike Benham (Denmark) Malthe Jakobsen | Ligier JS P320 | MI | 10 | Accident Damage |
| DNF | LMP3 | 17 | (Switzerland) Cool Racing | (United States) Maurice Smith (United Kingdom) Mike Benham (Denmark) Malthe Jakobsen | Nissan VK56DE 5.6 L V8 | MI | 10 | Accident Damage |

European Le Mans Series
| Previous race: 4 Hours of Barcelona | 2022 season | Next race: 4 Hours of Portimão |
