= 2023 4 Hours of Aragón =

Endurance sportscar racing event

The layout of the MotorLand Aragón

The 2023 4 Hours of Aragón was an endurance sportscar racing event held between 23 and 26 August 2023, as the third round of the 2023 European Le Mans Series season.

== Entry list ==
The pre-event entry list consisted of 42 entries in 4 categories - 7 in LMP2, 11 in LMP2 Pro/Am, 12 in LMP3 and 12 in LMGTE.

Nelson Piquet Jr. was replaced by Filipe Albuquerque in the No. 21 United Autosports USA. Piquet was unable to take part in this race due to calendar clash with Stock Car Pro Series. Bent Viscaal replaced Jack Hawksworth in the No. 20 Algarve Pro Racing. In the No. 83 AF Corse Ben Barnicoat was replaced by Alessio Rovera. Both Barnicoat and Hawksworth could not take part in this race due to a clash with IMSA SportsCar Championship. Jacek Zielonka was set to join Glenn van Berlo in the No. 10 Eurointernational but in the end Matthias Lüthen was Berlo's teammate in this race. Tom van Rompuy was replaced by Andreas Laskaratos in the No. 3 DKR Engineering.

United Autosport USA's No. 23 moved from LMP2 Pro/Am to LMP2 class after Jim McGuire was forced to not take part in this race weekend. Garnet Patterson joined Paul di Resta and Guy Smith in the No. 23 squad.

== Schedule ==
Date	Time (local: CEST)	Event
Thursday, 23 August	14:55	Free Practice 1
Friday, 24 August	14:00	Bronze Drivers Collective Test
Friday, 24 August	20:30	Free Practice 2
Saturday, 15 July	10:15	Qualifying - LMGTE
Saturday, 15 July	10:45	Qualifying - LMP3
Saturday, 15 July	11:15	Qualifying - LMP2 Pro/Am
Saturday, 15 July	11:45	Qualifying - LMP2
Saturday, 15 July	18:00	Race

== Free practice ==
- Only the fastest car in each class is shown.

Free Practice 1	Class	No.	Entrant	Time
Free Practice 1	LMP2	25	(Portugal) Algarve Pro Racing	1:49.272
Free Practice 1	LMP2 Pro/Am	37	(Switzerland) Cool Racing	1:48.738
Free Practice 1	LMP3	17	(Switzerland) Cool Racing	1:53.601
Free Practice 1	LMGTE	60	(Italy) Iron Lynx	1:58.347
Free Practice 2	Class	No.	Entrant	Time
Free Practice 2	LMP2	43	(Poland) Inter Europol Competition	1:48.316
Free Practice 2	LMP2 Pro/Am	21	(United States) United Autosports USA	1:48.670
Free Practice 2	LMP3	4	(Luxembourg) DKR Engineering	1:54.058
Free Practice 2	LMGTE	60	(Italy) Iron Lynx	1:57.265

== Qualifying ==
Pole position winners in each class are marked in bold.

Pos	Class	No.	Team	Driver	Time	Gap	Grid
1	**LMP2**	**22**	**(United States) United Autosports USA**	**(United Kingdom) Philip Hanson**	**1:46.822**	—	1
2	LMP2	30	(France) Duqueine Team	(Switzerland) Neel Jani	1:46.850	+0.028	2
3	LMP2	43	(Poland) Inter Europol Competition	(United Kingdom) Olli Caldwell	1:46.901	+0.079	3
4	LMP2	47	(Switzerland) Cool Racing	(Argentina) José María López	1:47.262	+0.440	4
5	LMP2	28	(France) IDEC Sport	(France) Paul-Loup Chatin	1:47.308	+0.486	5
6	LMP2	23	(United States) United Autosports USA	(Australia) Garnet Patterson	1:47.379	+0.557	6
7	LMP2	65	(France) Panis Racing	(Netherlands) Tijmen van der Helm	1:47.852	+1.030	7
8	**LMP2 Pro/Am**	**34**	**Racing Team Turkey**	**(Turkey) Salih Yoluç**	**1:49.361**	**+2.539**	8
9	LMP2 Pro/Am	99	(Germany) Proton Competition	(Italy) Giorgio Roda	1:49.682	+2.860	9
10	LMP2 Pro/Am	24	(United Kingdom) Nielsen Racing	(United States) Rodrigo Sales	1:49.859	+3.037	10
11	LMP2 Pro/Am	83	(Italy) AF Corse	(France) François Perrodo	1:49.898	+3.076	11
12	LMP2 Pro/Am	19	(Poland) Team Virage	(Germany) Alexander Mattschull	1:50.289	+3.467	12
13	LMP2 Pro/Am	37	(Switzerland) Cool Racing	(Switzerland) Alexandre Coigny	1:50.691	+3.869	13
14	LMP2 Pro/Am	81	(United States) DragonSpeed USA	(Sweden) Henrik Hedman	1:51.020	+4.198	14
15	LMP2 Pro/Am	3	(Luxembourg) DKR Engineering	(Greece) Andreas Laskaratos	1:52.016	+5.194	15
16	**LMP3**	**13**	**(Poland) Inter Europol Competition**	**(United States) Wyatt Brichacek**	**1:52.269**	**+5.447**	16
17	LMP3	31	(Switzerland) Racing Spirit of Léman	(France) Antoine Doquin	1:52.590	+5.768	17
18	LMP3	8	(Poland) Team Virage	(Portugal) Manuel Espírito Santo	1:52.616	+5.794	18
19	LMP2 Pro/Am	20	(Portugal) Algarve Pro Racing	(United States) Fred Poordad	1:52.632	+5.810	19
20	LMP3	11	(Italy) Eurointernational	(Canada) Adam Ali	1:52.649	+5.827	20
21	LMP2 Pro/Am	21	(United States) United Autosports USA	(Brazil) Daniel Schneider	1:52.651	+5.829	21
22	LMP3	10	(Italy) Eurointernational	(Netherlands) Glenn van Berlo	1:52.679	+5.857	22
23	LMP3	17	(Switzerland) Cool Racing	(Argentina) Marcos Siebert	1:52.773	+5.951	23
24	LMP3	15	(United Kingdom) RLR MSport	(France) Gaël Julien	1:52.832	+6.010	24
25	LMP3	4	(Luxembourg) DKR Engineering	(Portugal) Pedro Perino	1:52.833	+6.011	25
26	LMP3	12	(Germany) WTM by Rinaldi Racing	(Colombia) Óscar Tunjo	1:53.088	+6.266	26
27	LMP3	35	(France) Ultimate	(France) Matthieu Lahaye	1:53.340	+6.518	27
28	LMP3	7	(United Kingdom) Nielsen Racing	(United Kingdom) Ryan Harper-Ellam	1:53.503	+6.681	28
29	LMP3	5	(United Kingdom) RLR MSport	(Denmark) Valdemar Eriksen	1:53.657	+6.835	29
30	**LMGTE**	**66**	**(United Kingdom) JMW Motorsport**	**(Singapore) Martin Berry**	**1:57.022**	**+10.200**	30
31	LMGTE	50	(Denmark) Formula Racing	(Denmark) Johnny Laursen	1:57.263	+10.441	31
32	LMGTE	16	(Germany) Proton Competition	(United States) Ryan Hardwick	1:57.375	+10.553	32
33	LMGTE	93	(Germany) Proton Competition	(Republic of Ireland) Michael Fassbender	1:57.574	+10.752	33
34	LMGTE	57	(Switzerland) Kessel Racing	(Japan) Takeshi Kimura	1:57.598	+10.776	34
35	LMGTE	77	(Germany) Proton Competition	(Germany) Christian Ried	1:57.674	+10.852	35
36	LMGTE	72	(United Kingdom) TF Sport	(France) Arnold Robin	1:57.723	+10.901	36
37	LMGTE	55	(Switzerland) Spirit of Race	(United Kingdom) Duncan Cameron	1:57.850	+11.028	37
38	LMGTE	44	(Denmark) GMB Motorsport	(Denmark) Jens Reno Møller	1:58.034	+11.212	38
39	LMGTE	60	(Italy) Iron Lynx	(Italy) Claudio Schiavoni	1:59.303	+12.481	39
40	LMGTE	51	(Italy) AF Corse	(Greece) Kriton Lendoudis	1:59.769	+12.947	40
41	LMGTE	95	(United Kingdom) TF Sport	(United Kingdom) John Hartshorne	1:59.969	+13.147	41
42	LMP2	25	(Portugal) Algarve Pro Racing	—			42

== Race ==
=== Race result ===
The minimum number of laps for classification (70% of overall winning car's distance) was 83 laps. Class winners are marked in bold.

Final Classification
Pos	Class	No.	Team	Drivers	Car	Tyres	Laps	Time/Gap
1	**LMP2**	**22**	**(United States) United Autosports USA**	**(Japan) Marino Sato (United Kingdom) Philip Hanson (United Kingdom) Oliver Jarvis**	**Oreca 07**	G	**119**	**4:00:18.186**
2	LMP2	28	(France) IDEC Sport	(France) Paul Lafargue (France) Paul-Loup Chatin (Germany) Laurents Hörr	Oreca 07	G	119	+14.987
3	LMP2	25	(Portugal) Algarve Pro Racing	(United States) Kyffin Simpson (Australia) James Allen (United Kingdom) Alexander Lynn	Oreca 07	G	119	+25.257
4	LMP2	65	(France) Panis Racing	(United Kingdom) Manuel Maldonado (Netherlands) Job van Uitert (Netherlands) Tijmen van der Helm	Oreca 07	G	119	+37.383
5	**LMP2 Pro/Am**	**83**	**(Italy) AF Corse**	**(France) François Perrodo (France) Matthieu Vaxivière (Italy) Alessio Rovera**	**Oreca 07**	G	**119**	**+45.146**
6	LMP2	47	(Switzerland) Cool Racing	Vladislav Lomko (France) Reshad de Gerus (Argentina) José María López	Oreca 07	G	119	+56.150
7	LMP2 Pro/Am	24	(United Kingdom) Nielsen Racing	(United States) Rodrigo Sales (United Kingdom) Ben Hanley (Switzerland) Mathias Beche	Oreca 07	G	119	+1:00.030
8	LMP2	30	(France) Duqueine Team	(United Kingdom) Nicolás Pino (Austria) René Binder (Switzerland) Neel Jani	Oreca 07	G	119	+1:07.120 (Note: The No. 30 Duqueine Team was penalised for refuelling the car while it was not on its wheels and was handed 20 seconds penalty added to crew's total race time)
9	LMP2	23	(United States) United Autosports USA	(Australia) Garnet Patterson (United Kingdom) Guy Smith (United Kingdom) Paul di Resta	Oreca 07	G	119	+1:42.005
10	LMP2 Pro/Am	21	(United States) United Autosports USA	(Brazil) Daniel Schneider (United Kingdom) Andrew Meyrick (Portugal) Filipe Albuquerque	Oreca 07	G	119	+1:48.516
11	LMP2 Pro/Am	20	(Portugal) Algarve Pro Racing	(United States) Fred Poordad (France) Tristan Vautier (Netherlands) Bent Viscaal	Oreca 07	G	118	+1 Lap
12	LMP2 Pro/Am	99	(Germany) Proton Competition	(Italy) Giorgio Roda (Germany) Jonas Ried (Italy) Gianmaria Bruni	Oreca 07	G	118	+1 Lap
13	LMP2 Pro/Am	19	(Poland) Team Virage	(Germany) Alexander Mattschull (Guatemala) Ian Rodríguez (Colombia) Tatiana Calderón	Oreca 07	G	118	+1 Lap
14	LMP2 Pro/Am	81	(United States) DragonSpeed USA	(Sweden) Henrik Hedman (Colombia) Sebastián Montoya (Colombia) Juan Pablo Montoya	Oreca 07	G	118	+1 Lap
15	LMP2 Pro/Am	3	(Luxembourg) DKR Engineering	(Greece) Andreas Laskaratos (United Kingdom) Sebastián Álvarez (France) Nathanaël Berthon	Oreca 07	G	118	+1 Lap
16	**LMP3**	**17**	**(Switzerland) Cool Racing**	**(France) Adrien Chila (Argentina) Marcos Siebert (Mexico) Alejandro García**	**Ligier JS P320**	MI	**114**	**+5 Laps (Note: The No. 17 COOL Racing was penalised for not grounding the car during refuelling and was handed 20 seconds time penalty. The time was added to crew's total race time.)**
17	LMP3	12	(Germany) WTM by Rinaldi Racing	(Germany) Torsten Kratz (Germany) Leonard Weiss (Colombia) Óscar Tunjo	Duqueine M30 – D08	MI	113	+6 Laps
18	LMP3	35	(France) Ultimate	(France) Eric Trouillet (France) Matthieu Lahaye (France) Jean-Baptiste Lahaye	Ligier JS P320	MI	113	+6 Laps
19	**LMGTE**	**57**	**(Switzerland) Kessel Racing**	**(Japan) Takeshi Kimura (United States) Gregory Huffaker II (Italy) Davide Rigon**	**Ferrari 488 GTE Evo**	G	**113**	**+6 Laps**
20	LMGTE	16	(Germany) Proton Competition	(United States) Ryan Hardwick (Canada) Zacharie Robichon (Belgium) Alessio Picariello	Porsche 911 RSR-19	G	113	+6 Laps
21	LMGTE	93	(Germany) Proton Competition	(Republic of Ireland) Michael Fassbender (Estonia) Martin Rump (Austria) Richard Lietz	Porsche 911 RSR-19	G	113	+6 Laps
22	LMGTE	77	(Germany) Proton Competition	(Germany) Christian Ried (Italy) Giammarco Levorato (France) Julien Andlauer	Porsche 911 RSR-19	G	113	+6 Laps
23	LMGTE	66	(United Kingdom) JMW Motorsport	(Singapore) Martin Berry (United Kingdom) Lorcan Hanafin (United Kingdom) Jon Lancaster	Ferrari 488 GTE Evo	G	113	+6 Laps
24	LMGTE	55	(Switzerland) Spirit of Race	(United Kingdom) Duncan Cameron (South Africa) David Perel (Republic of Ireland) Matt Griffin	Ferrari 488 GTE Evo	G	113	+6 Laps
25	LMP3	15	(United Kingdom) RLR MSport	(Austria) Horst Felbermayr Jr (France) Gaël Julien (Poland) Mateusz Kaprzyk	Ligier JS P320	MI	113	+6 Laps
26	LMP2 Pro/Am	34	Racing Team Turkey	(Turkey) Salih Yoluç (Republic of Ireland) Charlie Eastwood (Switzerland) Louis Delétraz	Oreca 07	G	113	+6 Laps (Note: The No. 34 Racing Team Turkey was penalised for using an external battery to restart the engine during a pitstop and was handed 2 minutes penalty added to crew's total race time.)
27	LMP3	11	(Italy) Eurointernational	(United Kingdom) Matthew Richard Bell (Canada) Adam Ali	Ligier JS P320	MI	112	+7 Laps
28	LMGTE	60	(Italy) Iron Lynx	(Italy) Claudio Schiavoni (Italy) Matteo Cressoni (Italy) Matteo Cairoli	Porsche 911 RSR-19	G	112	+7 Laps
29	LMGTE	44	(Denmark) GMB Motorsport	(Denmark) Jens Reno Møller (Denmark) Gustav Birch (Denmark) Nicki Thiim	Aston Martin Vantage AMR	G	112	+7 Laps
30	LMP3	7	(United Kingdom) Nielsen Racing	(United Kingdom) Anthony Wells (United Kingdom) Ryan Harper-Ellam	Ligier JS P320	MI	112	+7 Laps
31	LMGTE	72	(United Kingdom) TF Sport	(France) Arnold Robin (France) Maxime Robin (France) Valentin Hasse-Clot	Aston Martin Vantage AMR	G	111	+8 Laps
32	LMGTE	51	(Italy) AF Corse	(Greece) Kriton Lendoudis (Portugal) Rui Águas (Belgium) Ulysse de Pauw	Ferrari 488 GTE Evo	G	111	+8 Laps
33	LMGTE	95	(United Kingdom) TF Sport	(United Kingdom) John Hartshorne (United Kingdom) Ben Tuck (United Kingdom) Jonathan Adam	Aston Martin Vantage AMR	G	111	+8 Laps
34	LMP3	5	(United Kingdom) RLR MSport	(Canada) James Dayson (Denmark) Valdemar Eriksen (United Kingdom) Jack Manchester	Ligier JS P320	MI	109	+10 Laps
35	LMP3	4	(Luxembourg) DKR Engineering	(United Arab Emirates) Alexander Bukhantsov (United Kingdom) James Winslow (Portugal) Pedro Perino	Duqueine M30 – D08	MI	108	+11 Laps
Not classified
	LMP2 Pro/Am	37	(Switzerland) Cool Racing	(Switzerland) Alexandre Coigny (Denmark) Malthe Jakobsen (France) Nicolas Lapierre	Oreca 07	G	110	
	LMP3	13	(Poland) Inter Europol Competition	(Portugal) Miguel Cristóvão (United Kingdom) Kai Askey (United States) Wyatt Brichacek	Ligier JS P320	MI	88	
	LMP3	8	(Poland) Team Virage	(Portugal) Manuel Espírito Santo (United Kingdom) Nick Adcock (Denmark) Michael Jensen	Ligier JS P320	MI	71	
	LMP3	31	(Switzerland) Racing Spirit of Léman	(France) Jacques Wolff (France) Jean-Ludovic Foubert (France) Antoine Doquin	Ligier JS P320	MI	69	
	LMP3	10	(Italy) Eurointernational	(Germany) Matthias Lüthen (Netherlands) Glenn van Berlo	Ligier JS P320	MI	67	
	LMP2	43	(Poland) Inter Europol Competition	(Angola) Rui Andrade (South Africa) Jonathan Aberdein (United Kingdom) Olli Caldwell	Oreca 07	G	32	
	LMGTE	50	(Denmark) Formula Racing	(Denmark) Johnny Laursen (Denmark) Conrad Laursen (Denmark) Nicklas Nielsen	Ferrari 488 GTE Evo	G	28	

=== Statistics ===
==== Fastest lap ====
Class	Driver	Team	Time	Lap
LMP2	(Switzerland) Neel Jani	(France) #30 Duqueine Team	1:48.864	91
LMP2 Pro/Am	(Denmark) Malthe Jakobsen	(Switzerland) #37 Cool Racing	1:48.792	81
LMP3	(Argentina) Marcos Siebert	(Switzerland) #17 Cool Racing	1:55.233	88
LMGTE	(Estonia) Martin Rump	(Germany) #93 Proton Competition	1:56.853	85
