= 2022 4 Hours of Barcelona =

The layout of the Circuit de Barcelona-Catalunya

The 2022 4 Hours of Barcelona was an endurance sportscar racing event that was held on 28 August 2022, as the fourth round of the 2022 European Le Mans Series.

In LMP2, the race was won by the #9 Prema Racing run Oreca 07-Gibson, driven by Lorenzo Colombo, Ferdinand Habsburg, and Louis Delétraz.

In LMP3, the race was won by the #13 Inter Europol Competition run Ligier JS P320, driven by Nico Pino, Charles Crews and Guilherme Oliveira.

In LMGTE, the race was won by the #77 Proton Competition run Porsche 911 RSR-19, driven by Christian Ried, Lorenzo Ferrari and Gianmaria Bruni.

== Qualifying ==
=== Qualifying Result ===
Pole position in each class are marked in bold.

Pos	Class	No.	Team	Time	Grid
1	**LMP2**	**65**	**(France) Panis Racing**	**1:34.802**	1
2	LMP2	37	(Switzerland) Cool Racing	1:34.899	2
3	**LMP2 Pro-Am**	**34**	**Racing Team Turkey**	**1:34.947**	3
4	LMP2	28	(France) IDEC Sport	1:34.976	4
5	LMP2 Pro-Am	88	(Italy) AF Corse	1:34.995	5
6	LMP2 Pro-Am	31	(France) TDS Racing x Vaillante	1:35.183	6
7	LMP2	9	(Italy) Prema Racing	1:35.207	7
8	LMP2	43	(Poland) Inter Europol Competition	1:35.288	8
9	LMP2	22	(United Kingdom) United Autosports	1:35.400	9
10	LMP2	19	(Portugal) Algarve Pro Racing	1:35.620	10
11	LMP2 Pro-Am	24	(United Kingdom) Nielsen Racing	1:35.640	11
12	LMP2 Pro-Am	47	(Portugal) Algarve Pro Racing	1:35.719	12
13	LMP2	21	(Belgium) Mühlner Motorsport	1:35.744	13
14	LMP2	35	(United Kingdom) BHK Motorsport	1:36.226	14
15	LMP2 Pro-Am	51	(Poland) Team Virage	1:36.342	15
16	LMP2	30	(France) Duqueine Team	1:36.923	16
17	**LMP3**	**17**	**(Switzerland) Cool Racing**	**1:40.112**	17
18	LMP3	13	(Poland) Inter Europol Competition	1:40.778	18
19	LMP3	2	(United Kingdom) United Autosports	1:41.005	19
20	LMP3	27	(Switzerland) Cool Racing	1:41.227	20
21	LMP3	4	(Luxembourg) DKR Engineering	1:41.347	21
22	LMP3	3	(United Kingdom) United Autosports	1:41.409	22
23	LMP3	6	(United Kingdom) 360 Racing	1:41.421	23
24	LMP3	15	(United Kingdom) RLR Msport	1:41.613	24
25	LMP3	14	(Poland) Inter Europol Competition	1:41.689	25
26	LMP3	11	(Italy) EuroInternational	1:41.745	26
27	LMP3	10	(Italy) EuroInternational	1:41.865	27
28	LMP3	5	(United Kingdom) RLR Msport	1:41.892	28
29	**LMGTE**	**69**	**Oman Racing with TF Sport**	**1:45.692**	29
30	LMGTE	83	(Italy) Iron Lynx	1:46.038	30
31	LMGTE	77	(Germany) Proton Competition	1:46.103	31
32	LMGTE	32	(Germany) Rinaldi Racing	1:46.459	32
33	LMGTE	57	(Switzerland) Kessel Racing	1:46.561	33
34	LMGTE	93	(Germany) Proton Competition	1:46.686	34
35	LMGTE	18	(Hong Kong) Absolute Racing	1:46.695	35
36	LMGTE	66	(United Kingdom) JMW Motorsport	1:46.734	36
37	LMGTE	55	(Switzerland) Spirit of Race	1:46.761	37
38	LMGTE	60	(Italy) Iron Lynx	1:47.433	38
39	LMGTE	95	Oman Racing with TF Sport	1:48.531	39

== Race ==
=== Race Result ===
Class winners are marked in bold. - Cars failing to complete 70% of the winner's distance are marked as Not Classified (NC).

Pos.	Class	No.	Team	Drivers	Chassis	Tyre	Laps	Time/Retired
Pos.	Class	No.	Team	Drivers	Engine	Tyre	Laps	Time/Retired
1	**LMP2**	**9**	**(Italy) Prema Racing**	**(Italy) Lorenzo Colombo** **(Switzerland) Louis Delétraz** **(Austria) Ferdinand Habsburg**	**Oreca 07**	G	**132**	**4:00:43.527‡**
1	**LMP2**	**9**	**(Italy) Prema Racing**	**(Italy) Lorenzo Colombo** **(Switzerland) Louis Delétraz** **(Austria) Ferdinand Habsburg**	**Gibson GK428 4.2 L V8**	G	**132**	**4:00:43.527‡**
2	LMP2	65	(France) Panis Racing	(France) Julien Canal (France) Nico Jamin (Netherlands) Job van Uitert	Oreca 07	G	132	+22.926 s
2	LMP2	65	(France) Panis Racing	(France) Julien Canal (France) Nico Jamin (Netherlands) Job van Uitert	Gibson GK428 4.2 L V8	G	132	+22.926 s
3	LMP2	37	(Switzerland) Cool Racing	(France) Nicolas Lapierre (Germany) Niklas Krütten (China) Ye Yifei	Oreca 07	G	132	+1:17.973
3	LMP2	37	(Switzerland) Cool Racing	(France) Nicolas Lapierre (Germany) Niklas Krütten (China) Ye Yifei	Gibson GK428 4.2 L V8	G	132	+1:17.973
4	LMP2	22	(United Kingdom) United Autosports	(United Kingdom) Philip Hanson (United Kingdom) Tom Gamble (United Kingdom) Duncan Tappy	Oreca 07	G	131	+1 Lap
4	LMP2	22	(United Kingdom) United Autosports	(United Kingdom) Philip Hanson (United Kingdom) Tom Gamble (United Kingdom) Duncan Tappy	Gibson GK428 4.2 L V8	G	131	+1 Lap
5	**LMP2 Pro-Am**	**88**	**(Italy) AF Corse**	**(France) François Perrodo** **(Denmark) Nicklas Nielsen** **(Italy) Alessio Rovera**	**Oreca 07**	G	**131**	**+1 Lap‡**
5	**LMP2 Pro-Am**	**88**	**(Italy) AF Corse**	**(France) François Perrodo** **(Denmark) Nicklas Nielsen** **(Italy) Alessio Rovera**	**Gibson GK428 4.2 L V8**	G	**131**	**+1 Lap‡**
6	LMP2	30	(France) Duqueine Team	(Mexico) Memo Rojas (Denmark) Anders Fjordbach (United Kingdom) Richard Bradley	Oreca 07	G	131	+1 Lap
6	LMP2	30	(France) Duqueine Team	(Mexico) Memo Rojas (Denmark) Anders Fjordbach (United Kingdom) Richard Bradley	Gibson GK428 4.2 L V8	G	131	+1 Lap
7	LMP2 Pro-Am	24	(United Kingdom) Nielsen Racing	(United States) Rodrigo Sales (United Kingdom) Matt Bell (United Kingdom) Ben Hanley	Oreca 07	G	131	+1 Lap
7	LMP2 Pro-Am	24	(United Kingdom) Nielsen Racing	(United States) Rodrigo Sales (United Kingdom) Matt Bell (United Kingdom) Ben Hanley	Gibson GK428 4.2 L V8	G	131	+1 Lap
8	LMP2 Pro-Am	47	(Portugal) Algarve Pro Racing	(United States) John Falb (Australia) James Allen (Australia) Alex Peroni	Oreca 07	G	131	+1 Lap
8	LMP2 Pro-Am	47	(Portugal) Algarve Pro Racing	(United States) John Falb (Australia) James Allen (Australia) Alex Peroni	Gibson GK428 4.2 L V8	G	131	+1 Lap
9	LMP2	21	(Belgium) Mühlner Motorsport	(Liechtenstein) Matthias Kaiser (France) Thomas Laurent (Belgium) Ugo de Wilde	Oreca 07	G	131	+1 Lap
9	LMP2	21	(Belgium) Mühlner Motorsport	(Liechtenstein) Matthias Kaiser (France) Thomas Laurent (Belgium) Ugo de Wilde	Gibson GK428 4.2 L V8	G	131	+1 Lap
10	LMP2 Pro-Am	34	Racing Team Turkey	(Turkey) Salih Yoluç (Republic of Ireland) Charlie Eastwood (United Kingdom) Jack Aitken	Oreca 07	G	130	+2 Laps
10	LMP2 Pro-Am	34	Racing Team Turkey	(Turkey) Salih Yoluç (Republic of Ireland) Charlie Eastwood (United Kingdom) Jack Aitken	Gibson GK428 4.2 L V8	G	130	+2 Laps
11	LMP2 Pro-Am	31	(France) TDS Racing x Vaillante	(France) Philippe Cimadomo (Switzerland) Mathias Beche (Netherlands) Tijmen van der Helm	Oreca 07	G	130	+2 Laps
11	LMP2 Pro-Am	31	(France) TDS Racing x Vaillante	(France) Philippe Cimadomo (Switzerland) Mathias Beche (Netherlands) Tijmen van der Helm	Gibson GK428 4.2 L V8	G	130	+2 Laps
12	LMP2	19	(Portugal) Algarve Pro Racing	(Germany) Sophia Flörsch (Netherlands) Bent Viscaal	Oreca 07	G	130	+2 Laps
12	LMP2	19	(Portugal) Algarve Pro Racing	(Germany) Sophia Flörsch (Netherlands) Bent Viscaal	Gibson GK428 4.2 L V8	G	130	+2 Laps
13	LMP2	28	(France) IDEC Sport	(France) Paul Lafargue (France) Paul-Loup Chatin (France) Patrick Pilet	Oreca 07	G	130	+2 Laps
13	LMP2	28	(France) IDEC Sport	(France) Paul Lafargue (France) Paul-Loup Chatin (France) Patrick Pilet	Gibson GK428 4.2 L V8	G	130	+2 Laps
14	LMP2 Pro-Am	51	(Poland) Team Virage	(United States) Rob Hodes (France) Gabriel Aubry (Guatemala) Ian Rodríguez	Oreca 07	G	129	+3 Laps
14	LMP2 Pro-Am	51	(Poland) Team Virage	(United States) Rob Hodes (France) Gabriel Aubry (Guatemala) Ian Rodríguez	Gibson GK428 4.2 L V8	G	129	+3 Laps
15	LMP2	35	(United Kingdom) BHK Motorsport	(Italy) Francesco Dracone (Italy) Sergio Campana (Germany) Markus Pommer	Oreca 07	G	128	+4 Laps
15	LMP2	35	(United Kingdom) BHK Motorsport	(Italy) Francesco Dracone (Italy) Sergio Campana (Germany) Markus Pommer	Gibson GK428 4.2 L V8	G	128	+4 Laps
16	LMP2	43	(Poland) Inter Europol Competition	(Switzerland) Fabio Scherer (Brazil) Pietro Fittipaldi (Denmark) David Heinemeier Hansson	Oreca 07	G	126	+6 Laps
16	LMP2	43	(Poland) Inter Europol Competition	(Switzerland) Fabio Scherer (Brazil) Pietro Fittipaldi (Denmark) David Heinemeier Hansson	Gibson GK428 4.2 L V8	G	126	+6 Laps
17	**LMP3**	**13**	**(Poland) Inter Europol Competition**	**(United States) Charles Crews** **(Chile) Nico Pino** **(Portugal) Guilherme Oliveira**	**Ligier JS P320**	MI	**125**	**+7 Laps‡**
17	**LMP3**	**13**	**(Poland) Inter Europol Competition**	**(United States) Charles Crews** **(Chile) Nico Pino** **(Portugal) Guilherme Oliveira**	**Nissan VK56DE 5.6 L V8**	MI	**125**	**+7 Laps‡**
18	LMP3	4	(Luxembourg) DKR Engineering	(Mexico) Sebastián Álvarez (United Arab Emirates) Alexander Bukhantsov (Belgium) Tom van Rompuy	Duqueine M30 – D08	MI	125	+7 Laps
18	LMP3	4	(Luxembourg) DKR Engineering	(Mexico) Sebastián Álvarez (United Arab Emirates) Alexander Bukhantsov (Belgium) Tom van Rompuy	Nissan VK56DE 5.6 L V8	MI	125	+7 Laps
19	LMP3	17	(Switzerland) Cool Racing	(United States) Maurice Smith (United Kingdom) Mike Benham (Denmark) Malthe Jakobsen	Ligier JS P320	MI	124	+8 Laps
19	LMP3	17	(Switzerland) Cool Racing	(United States) Maurice Smith (United Kingdom) Mike Benham (Denmark) Malthe Jakobsen	Nissan VK56DE 5.6 L V8	MI	124	+8 Laps
20	LMP3	6	(United Kingdom) 360 Racing	(United Kingdom) Terrence Woodward (United Kingdom) Ross Kaiser (United Kingdom) Mark Richards	Ligier JS P320	MI	124	+8 Laps
20	LMP3	6	(United Kingdom) 360 Racing	(United Kingdom) Terrence Woodward (United Kingdom) Ross Kaiser (United Kingdom) Mark Richards	Nissan VK56DE 5.6 L V8	MI	124	+8 Laps
21	LMP3	10	(United States) Eurointernational	(Netherlands) Glenn van Berlo (Spain) Xavier Lloveras (United Kingdom) Freddie Hunt	Ligier JS P320	MI	124	+8 Laps
21	LMP3	10	(United States) Eurointernational	(Netherlands) Glenn van Berlo (Spain) Xavier Lloveras (United Kingdom) Freddie Hunt	Nissan VK56DE 5.6 L V8	MI	124	+8 Laps
22	LMP3	5	(United Kingdom) RLR MSport	(Denmark) Michael Jensen (United Kingdom) Nick Adcock (United Kingdom) Alex Kapadia	Ligier JS P320	MI	123	+9 Laps
22	LMP3	5	(United Kingdom) RLR MSport	(Denmark) Michael Jensen (United Kingdom) Nick Adcock (United Kingdom) Alex Kapadia	Nissan VK56DE 5.6 L V8	MI	123	+9 Laps
23	LMP3	11	(United States) Eurointernational	(Netherlands) Max Koebolt (France) Louis Rousset (Switzerland) Jérôme de Sadeleer	Ligier JS P320	MI	123	+9 Laps
23	LMP3	11	(United States) Eurointernational	(Netherlands) Max Koebolt (France) Louis Rousset (Switzerland) Jérôme de Sadeleer	Nissan VK56DE 5.6 L V8	MI	123	+9 Laps
24	LMP3	15	(United Kingdom) RLR MSport	(Austria) Horst Felbemayr Jr. (Germany) Valentino Catalano (United States) Austin McCusker	Ligier JS P320	MI	123	+9 Laps
24	LMP3	15	(United Kingdom) RLR MSport	(Austria) Horst Felbemayr Jr. (Germany) Valentino Catalano (United States) Austin McCusker	Nissan VK56DE 5.6 L V8	MI	123	+9 Laps
25	**LMGTE**	**77**	**(Germany) Proton Competition**	**(Germany) Christian Ried** **(Italy) Lorenzo Ferrari** **(Italy) Gianmaria Bruni**	**Porsche 911 RSR-19**	G	**122**	**+10 Laps‡**
25	**LMGTE**	**77**	**(Germany) Proton Competition**	**(Germany) Christian Ried** **(Italy) Lorenzo Ferrari** **(Italy) Gianmaria Bruni**	**Porsche M97/80 4.2 L Flat-6**	G	**122**	**+10 Laps‡**
26	LMGTE	55	(Switzerland) Spirit of Race	(United Kingdom) Duncan Cameron (Republic of Ireland) Matt Griffin (South Africa) David Perel	Ferrari 488 GTE Evo	G	122	+10 Laps
26	LMGTE	55	(Switzerland) Spirit of Race	(United Kingdom) Duncan Cameron (Republic of Ireland) Matt Griffin (South Africa) David Perel	Ferrari F154CB 3.9 L Turbo V8	G	122	+10 Laps
27	LMGTE	66	(United Kingdom) JMW Motorsport	(Italy) Giacorno Petrobelli (Singapore) Sean Hudspeth (Spain) Miguel Molina	Ferrari 488 GTE Evo	G	122	+10 Laps
27	LMGTE	66	(United Kingdom) JMW Motorsport	(Italy) Giacorno Petrobelli (Singapore) Sean Hudspeth (Spain) Miguel Molina	Ferrari F154CB 3.9 L Turbo V8	G	122	+10 Laps
28	LMGTE	57	(Switzerland) Kessel Racing	(Japan) Takeshi Kimura (Denmark) Frederik Schandorff (Denmark) Mikkel Jensen	Ferrari 488 GTE Evo	G	122	+10 Laps
28	LMGTE	57	(Switzerland) Kessel Racing	(Japan) Takeshi Kimura (Denmark) Frederik Schandorff (Denmark) Mikkel Jensen	Ferrari F154CB 3.9 L Turbo V8	G	122	+10 Laps
29	LMGTE	18	(Hong Kong) Absolute Racing	(Indonesia) Andrew Haryanto (Estonia) Martin Rump (Belgium) Alessio Picariello	Porsche 911 RSR-19	G	122	+10 Laps
29	LMGTE	18	(Hong Kong) Absolute Racing	(Indonesia) Andrew Haryanto (Estonia) Martin Rump (Belgium) Alessio Picariello	Porsche M97/80 4.2 L Flat-6	G	122	+10 Laps
30	LMGTE	60	(Italy) Iron Lynx	(Italy) Claudio Schiavoni (Italy) Matteo Cressoni (Italy) Davide Rigon	Ferrari 488 GTE Evo	G	122	+10 Laps
30	LMGTE	60	(Italy) Iron Lynx	(Italy) Claudio Schiavoni (Italy) Matteo Cressoni (Italy) Davide Rigon	Ferrari F154CB 3.9 L Turbo V8	G	122	+10 Laps
31	LMGTE	95	Oman Racing with TF Sport	(United Kingdom) John Hartshorne (Portugal) Henrique Chaves (United Kingdom) Jonathan Adam	Aston Martin Vantage AMR	G	122	+10 Laps
31	LMGTE	95	Oman Racing with TF Sport	(United Kingdom) John Hartshorne (Portugal) Henrique Chaves (United Kingdom) Jonathan Adam	Aston Martin M177 4.0 L Turbo V8	G	122	+10 Laps
32	LMGTE	93	(Germany) Proton Competition	(Republic of Ireland) Michael Fassbender (Canada) Zacharie Robichon (Austria) Richard Lietz	Porsche 911 RSR-19	G	122	+10 Laps
32	LMGTE	93	(Germany) Proton Competition	(Republic of Ireland) Michael Fassbender (Canada) Zacharie Robichon (Austria) Richard Lietz	Porsche M97/80 4.2 L Flat-6	G	122	+10 Laps
33	LMGTE	32	(Germany) Rinaldi Racing	(Germany) Pierre Ehret (Argentina) Nicolás Varrone (Italy) Diego Alessi	Ferrari 488 GTE Evo	G	121	+11 Laps
33	LMGTE	32	(Germany) Rinaldi Racing	(Germany) Pierre Ehret (Argentina) Nicolás Varrone (Italy) Diego Alessi	Ferrari F154CB 3.9 L Turbo V8	G	121	+11 Laps
34	LMP3	2	(United Kingdom) United Autosports	(United Kingdom) Bailey Voisin (United Kingdom) Josh Caygill (Germany) Finn Gehrsitz	Ligier JS P320	MI	121	+11 Laps
34	LMP3	2	(United Kingdom) United Autosports	(United Kingdom) Bailey Voisin (United Kingdom) Josh Caygill (Germany) Finn Gehrsitz	Nissan VK56DE 5.6 L V8	MI	121	+11 Laps
35	LMP3	14	(Poland) Inter Europol Competition	(France) Noam Abramczyk (Poland) Mateusz Kaprzyk (Canada) James Dayson	Ligier JS P320	MI	120	+12 Laps
35	LMP3	14	(Poland) Inter Europol Competition	(France) Noam Abramczyk (Poland) Mateusz Kaprzyk (Canada) James Dayson	Nissan VK56DE 5.6 L V8	MI	120	+12 Laps
36	LMGTE	69	Oman Racing with TF Sport	(Oman) Ahmad Al Harthy (Denmark) Marco Sørensen (United Kingdom) Sam De Haan	Aston Martin Vantage AMR	G	119	+13 Laps
36	LMGTE	69	Oman Racing with TF Sport	(Oman) Ahmad Al Harthy (Denmark) Marco Sørensen (United Kingdom) Sam De Haan	Aston Martin M177 4.0 L Turbo V8	G	119	+13 Laps
DNF	LMP3	3	(United Kingdom) United Autosports	(Netherlands) Kay van Berlo (United States) James McGuire (United Kingdom) Andrew Bentley	Ligier JS P320	MI	0	Accident
DNF	LMP3	3	(United Kingdom) United Autosports	(Netherlands) Kay van Berlo (United States) James McGuire (United Kingdom) Andrew Bentley	Nissan VK56DE 5.6 L V8	MI	0	Accident
DNF	LMGTE	83	(Italy) Iron Lynx	(France) Doriane Pin (Denmark) Michelle Gatting (Belgium) Sarah Bovy	Ferrari 488 GTE Evo	G	0	Accident
DNF	LMGTE	83	(Italy) Iron Lynx	(France) Doriane Pin (Denmark) Michelle Gatting (Belgium) Sarah Bovy	Ferrari F154CB 3.9 L Turbo V8	G	0	Accident
DNF	LMP3	27	(Switzerland) Cool Racing	(Switzerland) Nicolas Maulini (France) Jean-Ludovic Foubert (France) Antoine Doquin	Ligier JS P320	MI	0	Accident
DNF	LMP3	27	(Switzerland) Cool Racing	(Switzerland) Nicolas Maulini (France) Jean-Ludovic Foubert (France) Antoine Doquin	Nissan VK56DE 5.6 L V8	MI	0	Accident

European Le Mans Series
Previous race: 4 Hours of Monza	2022 season	Next race: 4 Hours of Spa-Francorchamps
