= Scott Huffaker =

American racing driver (born 1999)

- Huffaker at Silverstone Circuit in 2026
- Nationality: (United States) American
- Born: Gregory Huffaker II; December 28, 1999 (age 26) Menlo Park, California, U.S.

IMSA SportsCar Championship career
- Debut season: 2020
- Current team: TDS Racing
- Categorisation: FIA Silver (until 2023); FIA Gold (2024–)
- Car number: 11
- Former teams: PR1/Mathiasen Motorsports
- Starts: 15
- Wins: 5
- Podiums: 8
- Poles: 8
- Fastest laps: 4

Previous series
- 2015–2016 2018 2019–2022: Pacific Formula F2000; Formula 4 United States Championship; IMSA Prototype Challenge

Championship titles
- 2015: Pacific Formula F1600
- Statistics up to date as of December 1, 2023.

Gregory Huffaker II (born December 28, 1999), commonly known as Scott Huffaker, is an American racing driver who competes in the IMSA SportsCar Championship, European Le Mans Series, and FIA World Endurance Championship.

== Career ==
=== Early career ===
After attending a number of races at a local BMX circuit as a spectator, Huffaker was encouraged to race by a track employee, leading to his maiden experience in motorsports. Huffaker began his racing career in BMX bikes at the age of five, quickly advancing through the ranks and winning at the BMX Grand Nationals two years later. Following this success, he began to transition into karting, winning two karting championships before he turned thirteen. Between 2010 and 2011, he raced nearly every weekend, adding up to a total of 104 races over the two-year stretch. In 2014, Huffaker graduated to single-seater competition, taking part in the SBF2000 Summer Series. The following year, he completed his first full-time campaign, racing in and winning the Pacific Formula F1600 championship. For 2016, he advanced to the Formula F2000 championship, claiming his first victory at Sonoma in July. Following this season, Huffaker and new team PR1/Mathiasen Motorsports began preparations to enter Formula 4 competition, competing in the Formula Pro USA F4 Championship in 2018. Winning ten of twelve races, Huffaker claimed the series championship. At the end of the season, he took part in the series finale for the US F4 Championship, finishing as high as sixth in the first race of the weekend.

=== Sports car racing ===
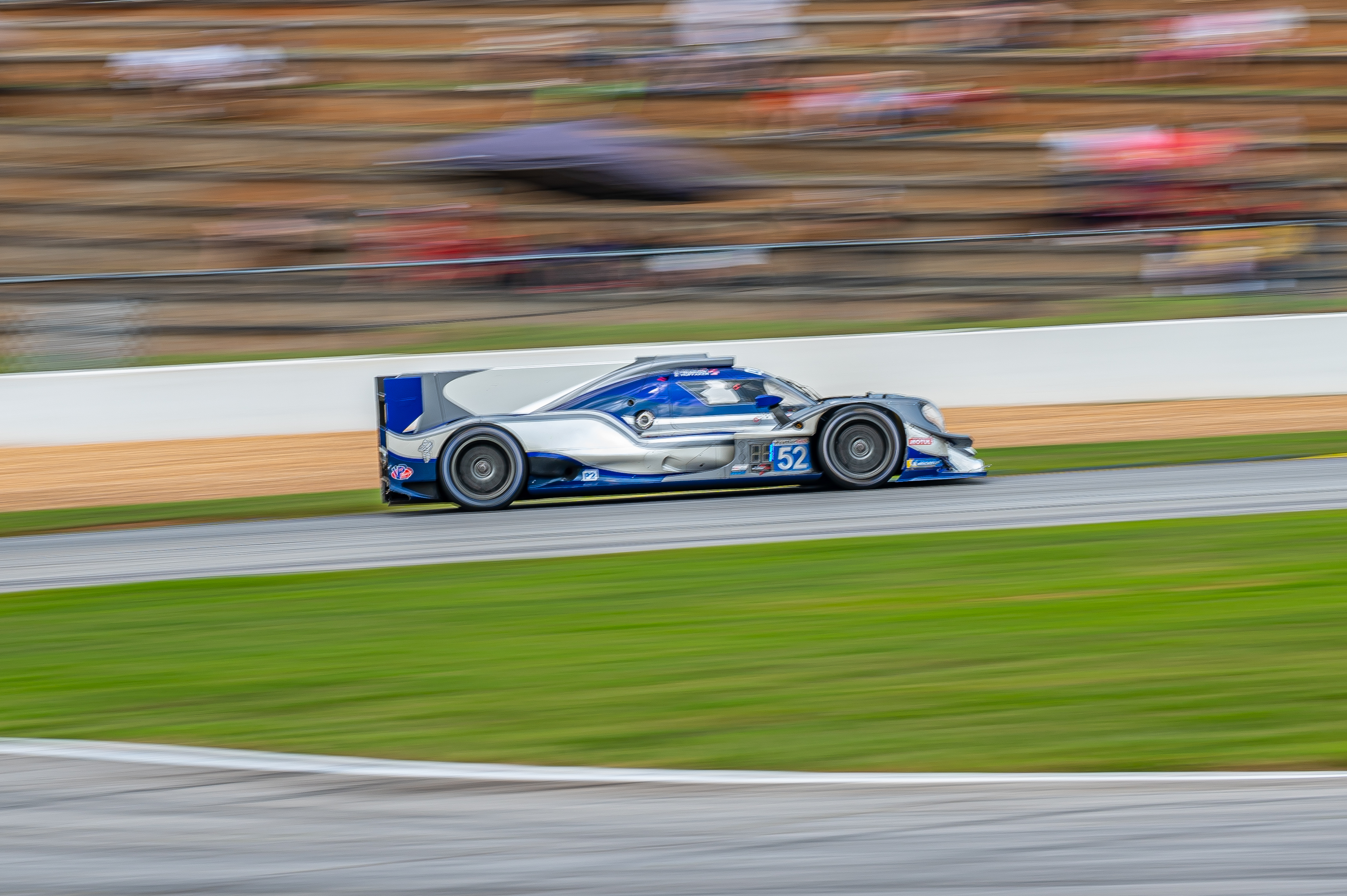
Huffaker's Oreca 07 at Road Atlanta in 2020.

In 2019, Huffaker continued with PR1/Mathiasen Motorsports, however began competing in sports car racing rather than single seaters. He took on a drive in the IMSA Prototype Challenge, piloting a Ligier JS P3 alongside Mike Guasch and later Chris Archinaco. Huffaker claimed one podium in 2019, finishing second at Mosport behind eventual series champions Austin McCusker and Rodrigo Pflucker. After that race, Huffaker was nominated to take part in the Team USA Scholarship shootout at Road America, where he would compete for the chance to race in the Formula Ford Festival and Walter Hayes Trophy events in England. Following the shootout, Huffaker and Josh Green were awarded the scholarship, and traveled to England to take part in the two events with Cliff Dempsey Racing. Huffaker began his Walter Hayes Trophy campaign with a victory in his heat race, taking advantage of a collision between leaders Joey Foster and Michael Moyers. He then scored a victory in his semi-final event, before claiming third in the overall final.

In 2020, Huffaker moved to the IMSA SportsCar Championship with PR1, joining the team's LMP2 program ahead of the Grand Prix at Road Atlanta. Joining Simon Trummer and Patrick Kelly, the team won the pole, scored the fastest lap in the LMP2 class, and took a class victory. Huffaker would return to the team for the remainder of the endurance events in 2020, and scored his second series victory in the season-ending 12 Hours of Sebring. Huffaker returned in his endurance role in 2021, joining the team for the entire Michelin Endurance Cup. Huffaker was part of three podium finishes in his four races, including his second consecutive class victory at the 12 Hours of Sebring. The team's performance was enough to secure the Michelin Endurance Cup title. At the end of 2021, Huffaker traveled to Bahrain to take part in the WEC Rookie Test, where he piloted an Aston Martin Vantage GTE. Huffaker once again reprised his endurance role in 2022, as PR1's No. 52 scaled back to an endurance-only IMSA campaign. Alongside Mikkel Jensen and Ben Keating, Huffaker claimed his third consecutive victory at Sebring, and added another at Watkins Glen, once again scoring the Michelin Endurance Cup title in the LMP2 class.

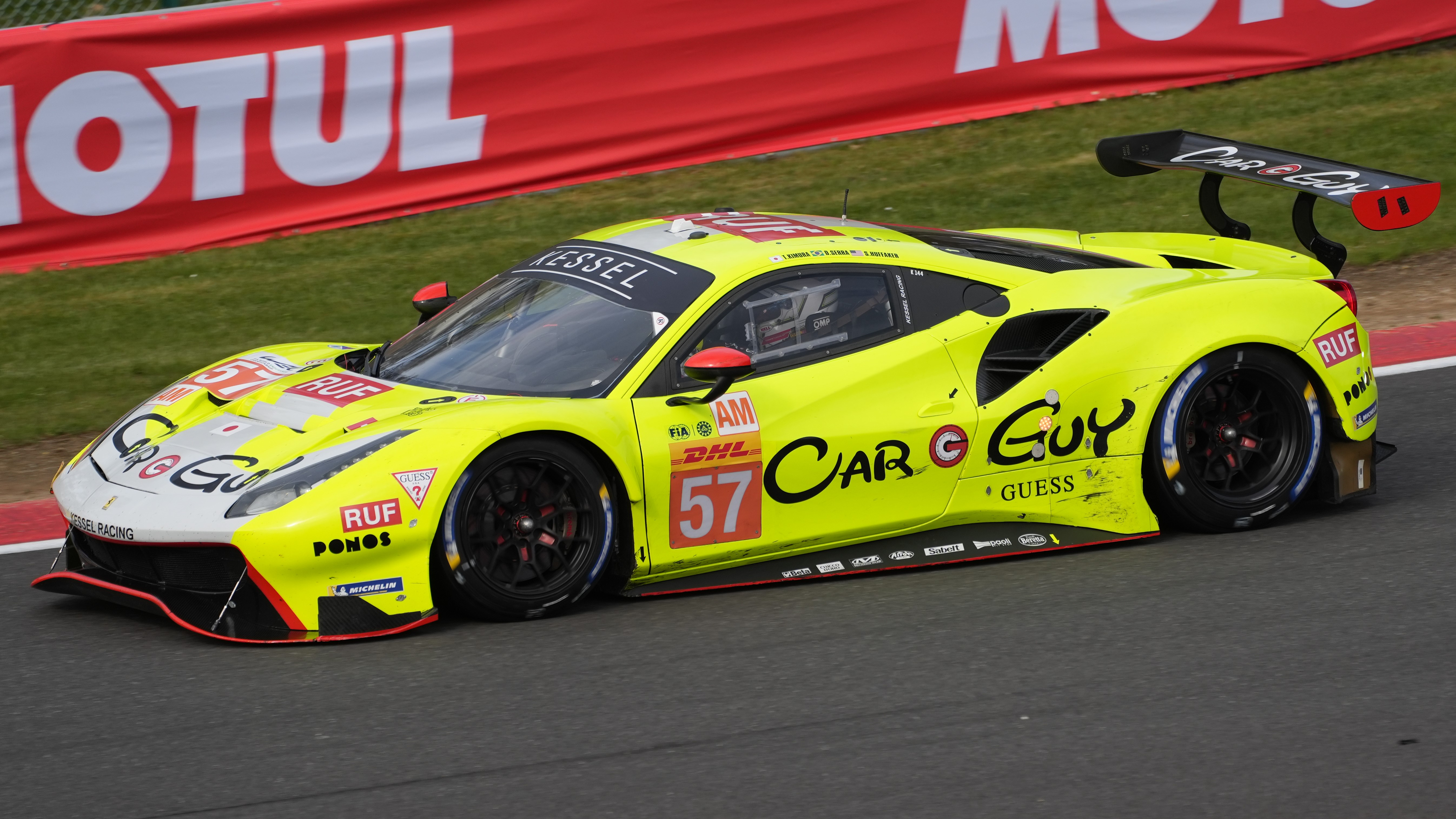
Huffaker's Ferrari 488 GTE at Spa in 2023.

In 2023, Huffaker pivoted to fellow LMP2 competitor TDS Racing, joining Jensen and Steven Thomas. Huffaker also embarked on a double program with Kessel Racing, taking on the FIA World Endurance Championship and European Le Mans Series in a Ferrari 488 GTE. The trio claimed their maiden podium in the opening race of the WEC season at Sebring, although Huffaker's debut at the 24 Hours of Le Mans saw the team retire with under 100 laps completed. Huffaker's sole race victory of the year came in the European Le Mans Series round at Aragón. Ahead of 2024, Huffaker was promoted to the FIA's Gold driver categorization.

== Personal life ==
Huffaker attended Menlo-Atherton High School and the University of Colorado Boulder, studying mechanical engineering.

== Racing record ==
=== Career summary ===
Season	Series	Team	Races	Wins	Poles	F/Laps	Podiums	Points	Position
2014	SBF2000 Summer Series	N/A	4	0	?	?	3	118	21st
2015	Pacific Formula F1600		8	6	6	6	7	244	**1st**
2016	Pacific Formula F2000		?	?	?	?	?	228	**3rd**
2017	Pacific F2000		2	0	?	?	2	47	12th
2018	SCCA Majors Championship Nationwide - Formula Atlantic		4	0	?	?	0	53	14th
2018	Formula 4 United States Championship	PR1 Motorsports	2	0	0	0	0	8	21st
2019	IMSA Prototype Challenge - LMP3	PR1/Mathiasen Motorsports	4	0	0	0	1	81	25th
2019	Formula Ford Festival	Cliff Dempsey Racing/Team USA Scholarship	2	0	0	0	0	N/A	NC
2020	IMSA SportsCar Championship - LMP2	PR1/Mathiasen Motorsports	3	2	3	1	2	98	**3rd**
2020	IMSA Prototype Challenge	CT Motorsports LLC	1	0	0	0	0	16	35th
2021	IMSA SportsCar Championship - LMP2	PR1/Mathiasen Motorsports	4	1	2	3	3	1057	5th
2021	IMSA Prototype Challenge - LMP3-1	CT Motorsports LLC	5	0	0	0	0	1050	11th
2022	IMSA SportsCar Championship - LMP2	PR1/Mathiasen Motorsports	4	2	3	0	2	1050	11th
2022	IMSA Prototype Challenge	CT Motorsports LLC	2	0	0	1	0	430	23rd
2022	Le Mans Cup - LMP3	AT Racing Team	2	0	0	0	0	0	NC
2023	IMSA SportsCar Championship - LMP2	TDS Racing	4	0	1	1	1	852	15th
2023	FIA World Endurance Championship - LMGTE Am	Kessel Racing	6	0	0	1	2	43	10th
2023	European Le Mans Series - LMGTE	Kessel Racing	6	1	0	0	1	65	4th
2023	24 Hours of Le Mans - LMGTE Am	Kessel Racing	1	0	0	0	0	N/A	DNF
2024	IMSA SportsCar Championship - LMP2	MDK by High Class Racing	4	0	0	0	0	1348	25th
2024	IMSA SportsCar Championship - LMP2	TDS Racing	1	0	0	0	1	1348	25th
2024	24 Hours of Le Mans - LMP2 Pro-Am	Olivier Panis	1	0	0	0	0	N/A	4th
2024	Lamborghini Super Trofeo North America - Pro-Am	World Speed	2	0	0	0	0	4	17th
2024	Lamborghini Super Trofeo North America - Pro	World Speed	6	0	0	0	1	35	6th
2025	Lamborghini Super Trofeo North America - Pro	World Speed	10	0	0	0	8	94	4th
2026	European Le Mans Series - LMP2	TDS Racing	6	1	0	1	2	77	**2nd**
2026-27	Asian Le Mans Series - LMP2	Nielsen Racing							

^{*} Season still in progress.

=== Complete Formula 4 United States Championship results ===
(key) (Races in bold indicate pole position) (Races in italics indicate fastest lap)

Year	Entrant	1	2	3	4	5	6	7	8	9	10	11	12	13	14	15	16	17	DC	Points
2018	PR1 Motorsports	VIR; 1	VIR; 2	VIR; 3	ROA; 1	ROA; 2	ROA; 3	MOH; 1	MOH; 2	MOH; 3	PIT; 1	PIT; 2	PIT; 3	NJMP; 1	NJMP; 2	NJMP; 3	COTA; 1; 6	COTA; 2; 14	21st	8

=== Complete IMSA SportsCar Championship results ===
(key) (Races in bold indicate pole position; races in italics indicate fastest lap)

Year	Entrant	Class	Car	Engine	1	2	3	4	5	6	7	Rank	Points
2020	PR1/Mathiasen Motorsports	LMP2	Oreca 07	Gibson GK428 4.2 L V8	DAY	SEB	ELK	**ATL**; 1	**PET**; 4	LGA	**SEB**; 1	3rd	98
2021	PR1/Mathiasen Motorsports	LMP2	Oreca 07	Gibson GK428 4.2 L V8	**DAY**; 7	SEB; 1	WGL; 2	WGL	ELK	LGA	**PET**; 2	5th	1057
2022	PR1/Mathiasen Motorsports	LMP2	Oreca 07	Gibson GK428 4.2 L V8	**DAY**; 4	**SEB**; 1	LGA	MOH	**WGL**; 1	ELK	PET; 6	11th	1050
2023	TDS Racing	LMP2	Oreca 07	Gibson GK428 4.2 L V8	DAY; 10	SEB; 2	LGA	**WGL**; 7	ELK	IMS	PET; 8	15th	852
2024	High Class Racing	LMP2	Oreca 07	Gibson GK428 4.2 L V8	DAY; 10	SEB	WGL; 4		ELK	IMS; 10	ATL; 8	25th	1348
2024	TDS Racing	LMP2	Oreca 07	Gibson GK428 4.2 L V8				MOS; 3				25th	1348

=== Complete FIA World Endurance Championship results ===
(key) (Races in bold indicate pole position; races in italics indicate fastest lap)

Year	Entrant	Class	Chassis	Engine	1	2	3	4	5	6	7	Rank	Points
2023	Kessel Racing	LMGTE Am	Ferrari 488 GTE Evo	Ferrari F154CB 3.9 L Turbo V8	SEB; 3	PRT; 10	SPA; 8	LMS; Ret	MNZ; Ret	FUJ; 3	BHR	10th	43

^{*} Season still in progress.

=== Complete European Le Mans Series results ===
(key) (Races in bold indicate pole position; races in italics indicate fastest lap)

Year	Entrant	Class	Chassis	Engine	1	2	3	4	5	6	Rank	Points
2023	Kessel Racing	LMGTE	Ferrari 488 GTE Evo	Ferrari F154CB 3.9 L Turbo V8	BAR; 7	LEC; 4	ARA; 1	SPA; 5	POR; 4	ALG; 12	4th	65
2026	TDS Racing	LMP2 Pro-Am	Oreca 07	Gibson GK428 4.2 L V8	CAT; 4	LEC; 4	IMO; Ret	SPA; 4	SIL; 1	ALG; 3	2nd	77

^{*} Season still in progress.

=== Complete 24 Hours of Le Mans results ===
Year	Team	Co-Drivers	Car	Class	Laps	Pos.	Class Pos.
2023	(Switzerland) Kessel Racing	(Japan) Takeshi Kimura (Brazil) Daniel Serra	Ferrari 488 GTE Evo	GTE; Am	254	DNF	DNF
2024	(France) Panis Racing	(Switzerland) Mathias Beche (United States) Rodrigo Sales	Oreca 07-Gibson	LMP2	293	23rd	9th
2024	(France) Panis Racing	(Switzerland) Mathias Beche (United States) Rodrigo Sales	Oreca 07-Gibson	LMP2 Pro-Am	293	23rd	4th
