= 2023 European Le Mans Series =

2023 ELMS season

The 2023 European Le Mans Series was the twentieth season of the Automobile Club de l'Ouest's (ACO) European Le Mans Series. The six-event season began at Circuit de Barcelona-Catalunya on 23 April and finished at Algarve International Circuit on 22 October.

The series was open to Le Mans Prototypes, divided into the LMP2 and LMP3 classes, and grand tourer-style racing cars in the LMGTE class. The season was the last for the LMGTE class.

== Calendar ==
The provisional calendar for the 2023 season was announced on 22 September 2022. MotorLand Aragón was added to the calendar for the first time, replacing the round at Monza, which left after serving as a late replacement for the Hungaroring during the 2022 season. The Portimão round was later postponed one week to alleviate a clash with the 2023 Petit Le Mans.

On 11 April it was announced the 4 Hours of Imola would be postponed due to ongoing works on the pit lane and paddock areas. On 14 April, the 4 Hours of Imola were officially cancelled, with the Portimão round becoming a double-header to fill the void.

Rnd	Race	Circuit	Location	Date
1	4 Hours of Barcelona	(Spain) Circuit de Barcelona-Catalunya	Montmeló, Spain	23 April
2	4 Hours of Le Castellet	(France) Circuit Paul Ricard	Le Castellet, France	16 July
3	4 Hours of Aragón	(Spain) MotorLand Aragón	Alcañiz, Spain	26 August
4	4 Hours of Spa-Francorchamps	(Belgium) Circuit de Spa-Francorchamps	Stavelot, Belgium	24 September
5	4 Hours of Algarve	(Portugal) Algarve International Circuit	Portimão, Portugal	20 October
6	4 Hours of Portimão	(Portugal) Algarve International Circuit	Portimão, Portugal	22 October
Cancelled
	Race	Circuit	Location	Original date
	4 Hours of Imola	(Italy) Imola Circuit	Imola, Italy	7 May

== Entries ==
=== LMP2 ===
All cars in the LMP2 class used the Gibson GK428 V8 engine and Goodyear tyres. Entries in the LMP2 Pro-Am class, set aside for teams with a Bronze-rated driver in their line-up, are denoted with icons.

Entrant/Team	Chassis	No.	MISC	Drivers	Rounds
(Luxembourg) DKR Engineering	Oreca 07	3	PA	(Mexico) Sebastián Álvarez	All
(Luxembourg) DKR Engineering	Oreca 07	3	PA	(France) Nathanaël Berthon	All
(Luxembourg) DKR Engineering	Oreca 07	3	PA	(Belgium) Tom Van Rompuy	1–2, 4–6
(Luxembourg) DKR Engineering	Oreca 07	3	PA	(Greece) Andreas Laskaratos	3
(Poland) Team Virage	Oreca 07	19	PA	(Colombia) Tatiana Calderón	All
(Poland) Team Virage	Oreca 07	19	PA	(Guatemala) Ian Rodríguez	All
(Poland) Team Virage	Oreca 07	19	PA	(Denmark) Dennis Andersen	1 (Note: Rob Hodes withdrew from round 1 after a crash in Friday's bronze test. Dennis Andersen was drafted in as a replacement before qualifying.)
(Poland) Team Virage	Oreca 07	19	PA	(United States) Rob Hodes	1
(Poland) Team Virage	Oreca 07	19	PA	(Germany) Alexander Mattschull	2–6
(Portugal) Algarve Pro Racing	Oreca 07	20	PA	(United States) Fred Poordad	All
(Portugal) Algarve Pro Racing	Oreca 07	20	PA	(France) Tristan Vautier	All
(Portugal) Algarve Pro Racing	Oreca 07	20	PA	(United Kingdom) Jack Hawksworth	1–2, 5–6
(Portugal) Algarve Pro Racing	Oreca 07	20	PA	(Netherlands) Bent Viscaal	3–4
(Portugal) Algarve Pro Racing	Oreca 07	25	P2	(Australia) James Allen	All
(Portugal) Algarve Pro Racing	Oreca 07	25	P2	(United Kingdom) Alex Lynn	All
(Portugal) Algarve Pro Racing	Oreca 07	25	P2	(Barbados) Kyffin Simpson	All
(United States) United Autosports USA	Oreca 07	21	PA	(United Kingdom) Andy Meyrick	All
(United States) United Autosports USA	Oreca 07	21	PA	(Brazil) Daniel Schneider	All
(United States) United Autosports USA	Oreca 07	21	PA	(Brazil) Nelson Piquet Jr.	1–2, 4–6
(United States) United Autosports USA	Oreca 07	21	PA	(Portugal) Filipe Albuquerque	3
(United States) United Autosports USA	Oreca 07	22	P2	(United Kingdom) Phil Hanson	All
(United States) United Autosports USA	Oreca 07	22	P2	(United Kingdom) Oliver Jarvis	All
(United States) United Autosports USA	Oreca 07	22	P2	(Japan) Marino Sato	All
(United States) United Autosports USA	Oreca 07	23	PA	(United Kingdom) Paul di Resta	1–2
(United States) United Autosports USA	Oreca 07	23	PA	(United States) Jim McGuire	1–2
(United States) United Autosports USA	Oreca 07	23	PA	(United Kingdom) Guy Smith	1–2
(United States) United Autosports USA	Oreca 07	23	P2	(United Kingdom) Paul di Resta	3
(United States) United Autosports USA	Oreca 07	23	P2	(Australia) Garnet Patterson	3
(United States) United Autosports USA	Oreca 07	23	P2	(United Kingdom) Guy Smith	3
(United Kingdom) Nielsen Racing	Oreca 07	24	PA	(Switzerland) Mathias Beche	All
(United Kingdom) Nielsen Racing	Oreca 07	24	PA	(United Kingdom) Ben Hanley	All
(United Kingdom) Nielsen Racing	Oreca 07	24	PA	(United States) Rodrigo Sales	All
(France) IDEC Sport	Oreca 07	28	P2	(France) Paul-Loup Chatin	All
(France) IDEC Sport	Oreca 07	28	P2	(Germany) Laurents Hörr	All
(France) IDEC Sport	Oreca 07	28	P2	(France) Paul Lafargue	All
(France) Duqueine Team	Oreca 07	30	P2	(Austria) René Binder	All
(France) Duqueine Team	Oreca 07	30	P2	(Switzerland) Neel Jani	All
(France) Duqueine Team	Oreca 07	30	P2	(Chile) Nico Pino	All
Racing Team Turkey	Oreca 07	34	PA	(Switzerland) Louis Delétraz	All
Racing Team Turkey	Oreca 07	34	PA	(Republic of Ireland) Charlie Eastwood	All
Racing Team Turkey	Oreca 07	34	PA	(Turkey) Salih Yoluç	All
(Switzerland) Cool Racing	Oreca 07	37	PA	(Switzerland) Alexandre Coigny	All
(Switzerland) Cool Racing	Oreca 07	37	PA	(Denmark) Malthe Jakobsen	All
(Switzerland) Cool Racing	Oreca 07	37	PA	(France) Nicolas Lapierre	All
(Switzerland) Cool Racing	Oreca 07	47	P2	(France) Reshad de Gerus	All
(Switzerland) Cool Racing	Oreca 07	47	P2	Vladislav Lomko (Note: Lomko is Russian, but he competes as a neutral competitor as Russian national emblems were banned by the FIA due to the Russian invasion of Ukraine. Bukhantsov, also a Russian, competes under an Emirati licence for the same reason.)	All
(Switzerland) Cool Racing	Oreca 07	47	P2	(Argentina) José María López	All
(Poland) Inter Europol Competition	Oreca 07	43	P2	(South Africa) Jonathan Aberdein	All
(Poland) Inter Europol Competition	Oreca 07	43	P2	(Angola) Rui Andrade	All
(Poland) Inter Europol Competition	Oreca 07	43	P2	(United Kingdom) Olli Caldwell	All
(France) Panis Racing	Oreca 07	65	P2	(Netherlands) Tijmen van der Helm	All
(France) Panis Racing	Oreca 07	65	P2	(Venezuela) Manuel Maldonado	All
(France) Panis Racing	Oreca 07	65	P2	(Netherlands) Job van Uitert	All
(United States) DragonSpeed USA	Oreca 07	81	PA	(Sweden) Henrik Hedman	All
(United States) DragonSpeed USA	Oreca 07	81	PA	(Colombia) Juan Pablo Montoya	All
(United States) DragonSpeed USA	Oreca 07	81	PA	(Colombia) Sebastián Montoya	All
(Italy) AF Corse	Oreca 07	83	PA	(France) François Perrodo	All
(Italy) AF Corse	Oreca 07	83	PA	(France) Matthieu Vaxivière	All
(Italy) AF Corse	Oreca 07	83	PA	(United Kingdom) Ben Barnicoat	1–2, 5–6
(Italy) AF Corse	Oreca 07	83	PA	(Italy) Alessio Rovera	3–4
(Germany) Proton Competition	Oreca 07	99	PA	(Germany) Jonas Ried	All
(Germany) Proton Competition	Oreca 07	99	PA	(Italy) Giorgio Roda	All
(Germany) Proton Competition	Oreca 07	99	PA	(Italy) Gianmaria Bruni	1–4
(Germany) Proton Competition	Oreca 07	99	PA	(Netherlands) Bent Viscaal	5–6

Icon	MISC
P2	LMP2
PA	LMP2 Pro-Am

=== LMP3 ===
All cars in the LMP3 class used the Nissan VK56DE 5.6L V8 engine and Michelin tyres.

Entrant/Team	Chassis	No.	Drivers	Rounds
(Luxembourg) DKR Engineering	Duqueine M30 - D08	4	(United Arab Emirates) Alexander Bukhantsov	All
(Luxembourg) DKR Engineering	Duqueine M30 - D08	4	(Mozambique) Pedro Perino	All
(Luxembourg) DKR Engineering	Duqueine M30 - D08	4	(United Kingdom) James Winslow	All
(United Kingdom) RLR MSport	Ligier JS P320	5	(Canada) James Dayson	All
(United Kingdom) RLR MSport	Ligier JS P320	5	(Denmark) Valdemar Eriksen	All
(United Kingdom) RLR MSport	Ligier JS P320	5	(United Kingdom) Jack Manchester	All
(United Kingdom) RLR MSport	Ligier JS P320	15	(Austria) Horst Felbermayr Jr.	All
(United Kingdom) RLR MSport	Ligier JS P320	15	(France) Gaël Julien	All
(United Kingdom) RLR MSport	Ligier JS P320	15	(Poland) Mateusz Kaprzyk	All
(United Kingdom) Nielsen Racing	Ligier JS P320	7	(United Kingdom) Ryan Harper-Ellam	All
(United Kingdom) Nielsen Racing	Ligier JS P320	7	(United Kingdom) Anthony Wells	All
(Poland) Team Virage	Ligier JS P320	8	(United Kingdom) Nick Adcock	All
(Poland) Team Virage	Ligier JS P320	8	(Portugal) Manuel Espírito Santo	All
(Poland) Team Virage	Ligier JS P320	8	(Denmark) Michael Jensen	All
(Italy) EuroInternational	Ligier JS P320	10	(Netherlands) Glenn van Berlo	1–4
(Italy) EuroInternational	Ligier JS P320	10	(United Kingdom) Nick Moss	1
(Italy) EuroInternational	Ligier JS P320	10	(Germany) Matthias Lüthen	2–3
(Italy) EuroInternational	Ligier JS P320	10	(France) François Hériau	4
(Italy) EuroInternational	Ligier JS P320	11	(Canada) Adam Ali	All
(Italy) EuroInternational	Ligier JS P320	11	(United Kingdom) Matthew Richard Bell	All
(Germany) WTM by Rinaldi Racing	Duqueine M30 - D08	12	(Germany) Torsten Kratz	All
(Germany) WTM by Rinaldi Racing	Duqueine M30 - D08	12	(Colombia) Óscar Tunjo	All
(Germany) WTM by Rinaldi Racing	Duqueine M30 - D08	12	(Germany) Leonard Weiss	All
(Poland) Inter Europol Competition	Ligier JS P320	13	(United Kingdom) Kai Askey	All
(Poland) Inter Europol Competition	Ligier JS P320	13	(United States) Wyatt Brichacek	All
(Poland) Inter Europol Competition	Ligier JS P320	13	(Portugal) Miguel Cristóvão	All
(Switzerland) Cool Racing	Ligier JS P320	17	(France) Adrien Chila	All
(Switzerland) Cool Racing	Ligier JS P320	17	(Mexico) Alex García	All
(Switzerland) Cool Racing	Ligier JS P320	17	(Argentina) Marcos Siebert	All
(Switzerland) Racing Spirit of Léman	Ligier JS P320	31	(France) Antoine Doquin	All
(Switzerland) Racing Spirit of Léman	Ligier JS P320	31	(France) Jacques Wolff	All
(Switzerland) Racing Spirit of Léman	Ligier JS P320	31	(France) Fabien Michal	1
(Switzerland) Racing Spirit of Léman	Ligier JS P320	31	(France) Jean-Ludovic Foubert	2–6
(France) Ultimate	Ligier JS P320	35	(France) Jean-Baptiste Lahaye	All
(France) Ultimate	Ligier JS P320	35	(France) Matthieu Lahaye	All
(France) Ultimate	Ligier JS P320	35	(France) Eric Trouillet	All

- Nicolás Varrone was scheduled to compete for WTM by Rinaldi Racing, but withdrew prior to the start of the season.
- Sebastián Álvarez was scheduled to compete for Inter Europol Competition, but withdrew prior to the start of the season.

=== LMGTE ===
All cars in the LMGTE class used Goodyear tyres.

Entrant/Team	Chassis	Engine	No.	Drivers	Rounds
(Germany) Proton Competition	Porsche 911 RSR-19	Porsche M97/80 4.2 L Flat-6	16	(United States) Ryan Hardwick	All
(Germany) Proton Competition	Porsche 911 RSR-19	Porsche M97/80 4.2 L Flat-6	16	(Belgium) Alessio Picariello	All
(Germany) Proton Competition	Porsche 911 RSR-19	Porsche M97/80 4.2 L Flat-6	16	(Canada) Zacharie Robichon	All
(Germany) Proton Competition	Porsche 911 RSR-19	Porsche M97/80 4.2 L Flat-6	77	(France) Julien Andlauer	All
(Germany) Proton Competition	Porsche 911 RSR-19	Porsche M97/80 4.2 L Flat-6	77	(Italy) Giammarco Levorato	All
(Germany) Proton Competition	Porsche 911 RSR-19	Porsche M97/80 4.2 L Flat-6	77	(Germany) Christian Ried	All
(Germany) Proton Competition	Porsche 911 RSR-19	Porsche M97/80 4.2 L Flat-6	93	(Republic of Ireland) Michael Fassbender	All
(Germany) Proton Competition	Porsche 911 RSR-19	Porsche M97/80 4.2 L Flat-6	93	(Austria) Richard Lietz	All
(Germany) Proton Competition	Porsche 911 RSR-19	Porsche M97/80 4.2 L Flat-6	93	(Estonia) Martin Rump	All
(Denmark) GMB Motorsport	Aston Martin Vantage AMR	Aston Martin M177 4.0 L Turbo V8	44	(Denmark) Gustav Birch	All
(Denmark) GMB Motorsport	Aston Martin Vantage AMR	Aston Martin M177 4.0 L Turbo V8	44	(Denmark) Jens Reno Møller	All
(Denmark) GMB Motorsport	Aston Martin Vantage AMR	Aston Martin M177 4.0 L Turbo V8	44	(Denmark) Nicki Thiim	All
(Denmark) Formula Racing	Ferrari 488 GTE Evo	Ferrari F154CB 4.0 L Turbo V8	50	(Denmark) Conrad Laursen	All
(Denmark) Formula Racing	Ferrari 488 GTE Evo	Ferrari F154CB 4.0 L Turbo V8	50	(Denmark) Johnny Laursen	All
(Denmark) Formula Racing	Ferrari 488 GTE Evo	Ferrari F154CB 4.0 L Turbo V8	50	(Denmark) Mikkel Mac	1
(Denmark) Formula Racing	Ferrari 488 GTE Evo	Ferrari F154CB 4.0 L Turbo V8	50	(Denmark) Nicklas Nielsen	2–6
(Italy) AF Corse	Ferrari 488 GTE Evo	Ferrari F154CB 4.0 L Turbo V8	51	(Portugal) Rui Águas	All
(Italy) AF Corse	Ferrari 488 GTE Evo	Ferrari F154CB 4.0 L Turbo V8	51	(Belgium) Ulysse de Pauw	All
(Italy) AF Corse	Ferrari 488 GTE Evo	Ferrari F154CB 4.0 L Turbo V8	51	(Greece) Kriton Lendoudis	All
(Switzerland) Spirit of Race	Ferrari 488 GTE Evo	Ferrari F154CB 4.0 L Turbo V8	55	(United Kingdom) Duncan Cameron	All
(Switzerland) Spirit of Race	Ferrari 488 GTE Evo	Ferrari F154CB 4.0 L Turbo V8	55	(Republic of Ireland) Matt Griffin	All
(Switzerland) Spirit of Race	Ferrari 488 GTE Evo	Ferrari F154CB 4.0 L Turbo V8	55	(South Africa) David Perel	All
(Switzerland) Kessel Racing	Ferrari 488 GTE Evo	Ferrari F154CB 4.0 L Turbo V8	57	(United States) Scott Huffaker	All
(Switzerland) Kessel Racing	Ferrari 488 GTE Evo	Ferrari F154CB 4.0 L Turbo V8	57	(Japan) Takeshi Kimura	All
(Switzerland) Kessel Racing	Ferrari 488 GTE Evo	Ferrari F154CB 4.0 L Turbo V8	57	(Denmark) Frederik Schandorff	1–2
(Switzerland) Kessel Racing	Ferrari 488 GTE Evo	Ferrari F154CB 4.0 L Turbo V8	57	(Italy) Davide Rigon	3
(Switzerland) Kessel Racing	Ferrari 488 GTE Evo	Ferrari F154CB 4.0 L Turbo V8	57	(Brazil) Daniel Serra	4–6
(Italy) Iron Lynx	Porsche 911 RSR-19	Porsche M97/80 4.2 L Flat-6	60	(Italy) Matteo Cairoli	All
(Italy) Iron Lynx	Porsche 911 RSR-19	Porsche M97/80 4.2 L Flat-6	60	(Italy) Matteo Cressoni	All
(Italy) Iron Lynx	Porsche 911 RSR-19	Porsche M97/80 4.2 L Flat-6	60	(Italy) Claudio Schiavoni	All
(United Kingdom) JMW Motorsport	Ferrari 488 GTE Evo	Ferrari F154CB 4.0 L Turbo V8	66	(Australia) Martin Berry	All
(United Kingdom) JMW Motorsport	Ferrari 488 GTE Evo	Ferrari F154CB 4.0 L Turbo V8	66	(United Kingdom) Lorcan Hanafin	All
(United Kingdom) JMW Motorsport	Ferrari 488 GTE Evo	Ferrari F154CB 4.0 L Turbo V8	66	(United Kingdom) Jon Lancaster	All
(United Kingdom) TF Sport	Aston Martin Vantage AMR	Aston Martin M177 4.0 L Turbo V8	72	(France) Valentin Hasse-Clot	All
(United Kingdom) TF Sport	Aston Martin Vantage AMR	Aston Martin M177 4.0 L Turbo V8	72	(France) Arnold Robin	All
(United Kingdom) TF Sport	Aston Martin Vantage AMR	Aston Martin M177 4.0 L Turbo V8	72	(France) Maxime Robin	All
(United Kingdom) TF Sport	Aston Martin Vantage AMR	Aston Martin M177 4.0 L Turbo V8	95	(United Kingdom) Jonathan Adam	All
(United Kingdom) TF Sport	Aston Martin Vantage AMR	Aston Martin M177 4.0 L Turbo V8	95	(United Kingdom) John Hartshorne	All
(United Kingdom) TF Sport	Aston Martin Vantage AMR	Aston Martin M177 4.0 L Turbo V8	95	(United Kingdom) Ben Tuck	All

== Results and standings ==
=== Race results ===
Bold indicates overall winner.

Rnd.	Circuit	Pole	LMP2 Winning Team	LMP2 Pro-Am Winning Team	LMP3 Winning Team	LMGTE Winning Team	Results
Rnd.	Circuit	Pole	LMP2 Winning Drivers	LMP2 Pro-Am Winning Drivers	LMP3 Winning Drivers	LMGTE Winning Drivers	Results
1	(Spain) Catalunya	(Switzerland) No. 47 Cool Racing	(France) No. 30 Duqueine Team	**No. 34 Racing Team Turkey**	(Switzerland) No. 17 Cool Racing	(Germany) No. 16 Proton Competition	Report
1	(Spain) Catalunya	**(France) Reshad de Gerus**; Vladislav Lomko (Argentina) José María López	(Austria) René Binder (Switzerland) Neel Jani (Chile) Nico Pino	**(Switzerland) Louis Delétraz** **(Republic of Ireland) Charlie Eastwood** **(Turkey) Salih Yoluç**	(France) Adrien Chila (Mexico) Alex García (Argentina) Marcos Siebert	(United States) Ryan Hardwick (Belgium) Alessio Picariello (Canada) Zacharie Robichon	Report
2	(France) Le Castellet	(Switzerland) No. 47 Cool Racing	**(Portugal) No. 25 Algarve Pro Racing**	No. 34 Racing Team Turkey	(Switzerland) No. 31 Racing Spirit of Léman	(Germany) No. 77 Proton Competition	Report
2	(France) Le Castellet	(France) Reshad de Gerus; Vladislav Lomko **(Argentina) José María López**	**(Australia) James Allen** **(United Kingdom) Alex Lynn** **(Barbados) Kyffin Simpson**	(Switzerland) Louis Delétraz (Republic of Ireland) Charlie Eastwood (Turkey) Salih Yoluç	(France) Antoine Doquin (France) Jean-Ludovic Foubert (France) Jacques Wolff	(France) Julien Andlauer (Italy) Giammarco Levorato (Germany) Christian Ried	Report
3	(Spain) Aragón	(United States) No. 22 United Autosports USA	**(United States) No. 22 United Autosports USA**	(Italy) No. 83 AF Corse	(Switzerland) No. 17 Cool Racing	(Switzerland) No. 57 Kessel Racing	Report
3	(Spain) Aragón	**(United Kingdom) Phil Hanson** (United Kingdom) Oliver Jarvis (Japan) Marino Sato	**(United Kingdom) Phil Hanson** **(United Kingdom) Oliver Jarvis** **(Japan) Marino Sato**	(France) Francois Perrodo (Italy) Alessio Rovera (France) Matthieu Vaxivière	(France) Adrien Chila (Mexico) Alex García (Argentina) Marcos Siebert	(United States) Scott Huffaker (Japan) Takeshi Kimura (Italy) Davide Rigon	Report
4	(Belgium) Spa-Francorchamps	(Portugal) No. 25 Algarve Pro Racing	**(Portugal) No. 25 Algarve Pro Racing**	(Switzerland) No. 37 Cool Racing	(Switzerland) No. 17 Cool Racing	(Italy) No. 60 Iron Lynx	Report
4	(Belgium) Spa-Francorchamps	(Australia) James Allen **(United Kingdom) Alex Lynn** (Barbados) Kyffin Simpson	**(Australia) James Allen** **(United Kingdom) Alex Lynn** **(Barbados) Kyffin Simpson**	(Switzerland) Alexandre Coigny (Denmark) Malthe Jakobsen (France) Nicolas Lapierre	(France) Adrien Chila (Mexico) Alex García (Argentina) Marcos Siebert	(Italy) Matteo Cairoli (Italy) Matteo Cressoni (Italy) Claudio Schiavoni	Report
5	(Portugal) Algarve	(Portugal) No. 25 Algarve Pro Racing	**(United States) No. 22 United Autosports USA**	(Switzerland) No. 37 Cool Racing	(Germany) No. 12 WTM by Rinaldi Racing	(Germany) No. 77 Proton Competition	Report
5	(Portugal) Algarve	**(Australia) James Allen** (United Kingdom) Alex Lynn (Barbados) Kyffin Simpson	**(United Kingdom) Phil Hanson** **(United Kingdom) Oliver Jarvis** **(Japan) Marino Sato**	(Switzerland) Alexandre Coigny (Denmark) Malthe Jakobsen (France) Nicolas Lapierre	(Germany) Torsten Kratz (Colombia) Óscar Tunjo (Germany) Leonard Weiss	(France) Julien Andlauer (Italy) Giammarco Levorato (Germany) Christian Ried	Report
6	(Portugal) Algarve	(France) No. 28 IDEC Sport	**(United States) No. 22 United Autosports USA**	(Italy) No. 83 AF Corse	(Italy) No. 11 EuroInternational	(Germany) No. 16 Proton Competition	Report
6	(Portugal) Algarve	**(France) Paul-Loup Chatin** (Germany) Laurents Hörr (France) Paul Lafargue	**(United Kingdom) Phil Hanson** **(United Kingdom) Oliver Jarvis** **(Japan) Marino Sato**	(United Kingdom) Ben Barnicoat (France) Francois Perrodo (France) Matthieu Vaxivière	(Canada) Adam Ali (United Kingdom) Matthew Richard Bell	(United States) Ryan Hardwick (Belgium) Alessio Picariello (Canada) Zacharie Robichon	Report

== Season report ==
=== Barcelona ===
The season began in Barcelona, where sophomore Reshad de Gerus took his maiden pole position in the No. 47 Cool Racing entry. The race for the overall win developed into a fight between the No. 30 Duqueine of Neel Jani and the Pro-Am class No. 34 Racing Team Turkey car of Louis Delétraz. Despite an unscheduled stop to replace his rear bodywork, Delétraz caught up to Jani and passed him with 15 minutes to go, allowing him, Charlie Eastwood, and Pro-Am polesitter Salih Yoluç to claim the overall win. Jani in the Duqueine settled for second, while the Pro-Am No. 83 AF Corse crew completed the podium in third. In LMP3, the No. 17 of Cool Racing won after the No. 31 Racing Spirit of Léman, which Antoine Doquin had held in front of the chasing Marcos Siebert during the closing laps, was penalised for a full-course yellow infringement. The LMGTE race was controlled by the No. 16 Proton Competition Porsche of Alessio Picariello, Zacharie Robichon, and Ryan Hardwick.

=== Le Castellet ===
At Le Castellet, Cool Racing's No. 47 continued its pole streak, this time with José María López. Originally, the No. 28 IDEC Sport Oreca had looked on course to take the win, before Paul-Loup Chatin was forced to pit with a puncture. This promoted Delétraz in the No. 34 to the front, only to be overtaken by Algarve Pro Racing's James Allen after suffering a de-laminating tyre; the No. 25 Algarve Pro of Allen, Alex Lynn, and Kyffin Simpson went on to win ahead of Neel Jani's No. 30 Duqueine and the No. 34 RTT, which held on to third despite a late onslaught by the No. 43 Inter Europol entry. The No. 34 nevertheless took a Pro-Am victory ahead of the No. 37 Cool Racing and No. 83 AF Corse crews. The LMP3 battle went the way of RSL's No. 31, which benefited from a mid-race safety car that removed WTM by Rinaldi Racing's 30-second lead gap. In LMGTE, Proton won again, this time with the No. 77 lineup of Julien Andlauer, Giammarco Levorato, and team owner Christian Ried.

=== Aragón ===
The ELMS went to Aragón for the first time in its history. Phil Hanson took pole in the No. 22 United Autosports entry, and went on to win alongside Oliver Jarvis and Marino Sato, in part due to a quick final pit stop. The No. 28 IDEC car of Chatin finished 15 seconds behind, with the French driver successfully defending second place against Algarve Pro's Alex Lynn. LMP2 Pro-Am, won by the No. 83 AF Corse crew of Matthieu Vaxivière, François Perrodo, and stand-in driver Alessio Rovera, proved dramatic, as the No. 34 RTT entry dropped out of contention with a late pit stop problem, while the No. 37 Cool Racing car of Malthe Jakobsen retired after hitting the sister No. 47 car of López. A clean run allowed the Cool Racing No. 17 to win an attrition-filled LMP3 class, while the No. 57 Kessel Racing triumphed in LMGTE.

=== Spa-Francorchamps ===
Algarve Pro's Alex Lynn claimed pole position for the 4 Hours of Spa-Francorchamps. At the race start, Panis Racing's Manuel Maldonado misjudged his braking spot and caused a four-car collision, for which he later received a one-minute stop-and-go penalty. The polesitting No. 25 of Algarve Pro retained the lead in spite of several race neutralisations and went on to win, extending its championship advantage. The No. 37 Cool Racing Pro-Am entry finished second overall and won its class, meanwhile a late overtake from Matthieu Vaxivière on Louis Delétraz allowed the AF Corse No. 83 to finish third overall. LMP3 was again won by the No. 17, meanwhile the Iron Lynx No. 60 led by Matteo Cairoli won in LMGTE after a post-race penalty for the original winners, the Proton No. 16.

=== Algarve ===
At the 4 Hours of Algarve, held as a double-header alongside the season finale, James Allen took pole in the championship-leading No. 25. In a wet race meanwhile, a late overtake and subsequent defense by Oliver Jarvis on Alex Lynn allowed the No. 22 United crew to narrowly beat the No. 25 to victory. With a penalty awarded to the No. 24 Nielsen Racing entry, the Cool Racing No. 37 inherited the win in the Pro-Am class, teeing up a title decider between it, the third-placed No. 83 AF Corse crew, and the No. 34 RTT car, which had gotten beached during the first hour at the hands of Yoluç. While the WTM by Rinaldi No. 12 won in LMP3, a fourth place was enough for Marcos Siebert, Alex García, and Adrien Chila to win the title for Cool Racing. LMGTE was decided in a battle between the two Proton Porsches, with the No. 77 of Andlauer coming out on top versus the No. 16 of Picariello.

=== Portimão ===
Going into the final race at Portimão, Paul-Loup Chatin achieved pole position for IDEC Sport. The race got going after a rain delay and was won by the No. 22 United crew, although the Algarve Pro No. 25 prevailed in the championship by finishing second, despite being attacked in the hectic final laps by third-placed Job van Uitert. Victory for the No. 16 Proton entry earned them the LMGTE title, meanwhile EuroInternational won in LMP3. In LMP2 Pro-Am, a late charge by the Cool Racing No. 37 of Malthe Jakobsen was stopped by the No. 83's Ben Barnicoat, whose defense allowed full-time drivers Vaxivière and Perrodo to clinch the championship.

== Drivers' Championships ==
Points are awarded according to the following structure:

Position	**1st**	**2nd**	**3rd**	**4th**	**5th**	**6th**	**7th**	**8th**	**9th**	**10th**	**Pole**
Points	25	18	15	12	10	8	6	4	2	1	1

=== LMP2 Drivers Championship ===
Pos.	Driver	Team	CAT (Spain)	LEC (France)	ARA (Spain)	SPA (Belgium)	ALG (Portugal)	POR (Portugal)	Points
1	(Australia) James Allen	(Portugal) Algarve Pro Racing	5	1	3	**1**	**2**	2	113
1	(United Kingdom) Alex Lynn	(Portugal) Algarve Pro Racing	5	1	3	**1**	**2**	2	113
1	(Barbados) Kyffin Simpson	(Portugal) Algarve Pro Racing	5	1	3	**1**	**2**	2	113
2	(United Kingdom) Phil Hanson	(United States) United Autosports USA	6	7	**1**	5	1	1	100
2	(United Kingdom) Oliver Jarvis	(United States) United Autosports USA	6	7	**1**	5	1	1	100
2	(Japan) Marino Sato	(United States) United Autosports USA	6	7	**1**	5	1	1	100
3	(Netherlands) Tijmen van der Helm	(France) Panis Racing	2	6	4	2	3	3	86
3	(Venezuela) Manuel Maldonado	(France) Panis Racing	2	6	4	2	3	3	86
3	(Netherlands) Job van Uitert	(France) Panis Racing	2	6	4	2	3	3	86
4	(Austria) René Binder	(France) Duqueine Team	1	2	6	6	5	5	79
4	(Switzerland) Neel Jani	(France) Duqueine Team	1	2	6	6	5	5	79
4	(Chile) Nico Pino	(France) Duqueine Team	1	2	6	6	5	5	79
5	(France) Paul-Loup Chatin	(France) IDEC Sport	3	5	2	4	7	**6**	72
5	(Germany) Laurents Hörr	(France) IDEC Sport	3	5	2	4	7	**6**	72
5	(France) Paul Lafargue	(France) IDEC Sport	3	5	2	4	7	**6**	72
6	(France) Reshad de Gerus	(Switzerland) Cool Racing	**4**	**4**	5	3	4	7	69
6	Vladislav Lomko	(Switzerland) Cool Racing	**4**	**4**	5	3	4	7	69
6	(Argentina) José María López	(Switzerland) Cool Racing	**4**	**4**	5	3	4	7	69
7	(South Africa) Jonathan Aberdein	(Poland) Inter Europol Competition	Ret	3	Ret	Ret	6	4	33
7	(Angola) Rui Andrade	(Poland) Inter Europol Competition	Ret	3	Ret	Ret	6	4	33
7	(United Kingdom) Olli Caldwell	(Poland) Inter Europol Competition	Ret	3	Ret	Ret	6	4	33
Entries ineligible to score points
—	(United Kingdom) Paul di Resta	(United States) United Autosports USA			7				—
—	(Australia) Garnet Patterson	(United States) United Autosports USA			7				—
—	(United Kingdom) Guy Smith	(United States) United Autosports USA			7				—
Pos.	Driver	Team	CAT (Spain)	LEC (France)	ARA (Spain)	SPA (Belgium)	ALG (Portugal)	POR (Portugal)	Points

Key
Colour	Result
Gold	Race winner
Silver	2nd place
Bronze	3rd place
Green	Points finish
Blue	Non-points finish
Blue	Non-classified finish (NC)
Purple	Did not finish (Ret)
Black	Disqualified (DSQ)
Black	Excluded (EX)
White	Did not start (DNS)
White	Race cancelled (C)
White	Withdrew (WD)
Blank	Did not participate

**Bold** – Pole

Italics – Fastest lap

=== LMP2 Pro/Am Drivers Championship ===
Pos.	Driver	Team	CAT (Spain)	LEC (France)	ARA (Spain)	SPA (Belgium)	ALG (Portugal)	POR (Portugal)	Points
1	(France) François Perrodo	(Italy) AF Corse	2	3	1	4	3	1	110
1	(France) Matthieu Vaxivière	(Italy) AF Corse	2	3	1	4	3	1	110
2	(Switzerland) Alexandre Coigny	(Switzerland) Cool Racing	3	2	Ret	1	1	2	101
2	(Denmark) Malthe Jakobsen	(Switzerland) Cool Racing	3	2	Ret	1	1	2	101
2	(France) Nicolas Lapierre	(Switzerland) Cool Racing	3	2	Ret	1	1	2	101
3	(Switzerland) Louis Delétraz	Racing Team Turkey	**1**	**1**	**9**	**2**	6	4	94
3	(Republic of Ireland) Charlie Eastwood	Racing Team Turkey	**1**	**1**	**9**	**2**	6	4	94
3	(Turkey) Salih Yoluç	Racing Team Turkey	**1**	**1**	**9**	**2**	6	4	94
4	(Switzerland) Mathias Beche	(United Kingdom) Nielsen Racing	4	4	2	Ret	2	3	75
4	(United Kingdom) Ben Hanley	(United Kingdom) Nielsen Racing	4	4	2	Ret	2	3	75
4	(United States) Rodrigo Sales	(United Kingdom) Nielsen Racing	4	4	2	Ret	2	3	75
5	(United Kingdom) Ben Barnicoat	(Italy) AF Corse	2	3			3	1	73
6	(United Kingdom) Andy Meyrick	(United States) United Autosports USA	10	5	3	3	4	9	55
6	(Brazil) Daniel Schneider	(United States) United Autosports USA	10	5	3	3	4	9	55
7	(Sweden) Henrik Hedman	(United States) DragonSpeed USA	7	7	7	7	5	5	44
7	(Colombia) Juan Pablo Montoya	(United States) DragonSpeed USA	7	7	7	7	5	5	44
7	(Colombia) Sebastián Montoya	(United States) DragonSpeed USA	7	7	7	7	5	5	44
8	(Brazil) Nelson Piquet Jr.	(United States) United Autosports USA	10	5		3	4	9	40
9	(United States) Fred Poordad	(Portugal) Algarve Pro Racing	8	8	4	6	7	8	38
9	(France) Tristan Vautier	(Portugal) Algarve Pro Racing	8	8	4	6	7	8	38
10	(Italy) Alessio Rovera	(Italy) AF Corse			1	4			37
11	(Germany) Jonas Ried	(Germany) Proton Competition	6	6	5	Ret	Ret	**7**	33
11	(Italy) Giorgio Roda	(Germany) Proton Competition	6	6	5	Ret	Ret	**7**	33
12	(Mexico) Sebastián Álvarez	(Luxembourg) DKR Engineering	5	9	8	8	8	6	32
12	(France) Nathanaël Berthon	(Luxembourg) DKR Engineering	5	9	8	8	8	6	32
13	(Belgium) Tom Van Rompuy	(Luxembourg) DKR Engineering	5	9		8	8	6	28
14	(Netherlands) Bent Viscaal	(Portugal) Algarve Pro Racing			4	6			27
14	(Netherlands) Bent Viscaal	(Germany) Proton Competition					Ret	**7**	27
15	(Italy) Gianmaria Bruni	(Germany) Proton Competition	6	6	5	Ret			26
16	(Colombia) Tatiana Calderón	(Poland) Team Virage	9	NC	6	5	**9**	10	24
16	(Guatemala) Ian Rodríguez	(Poland) Team Virage	9	NC	6	5	**9**	10	24
17	(Germany) Alexander Mattschull	(Poland) Team Virage		NC	6	5	**9**	10	22
18	(United Kingdom) Jack Hawksworth	(Portugal) Algarve Pro Racing	8	8			7	8	18
19	(Portugal) Filipe Albuquerque	(United States) United Autosports USA			3				15
20	(Greece) Andreas Laskaratos	(Luxembourg) DKR Engineering			8				4
21	(Denmark) Dennis Andersen	(Poland) Team Virage	9						2
22	(United Kingdom) Paul di Resta	(United States) United Autosports USA	11	10					1
22	(United States) Jim McGuire	(United States) United Autosports USA	11	10					1
22	(United Kingdom) Guy Smith	(United States) United Autosports USA	11	10					1
—	(United States) Rob Hodes	(Poland) Team Virage	WD						—
Pos.	Driver	Team	CAT (Spain)	LEC (France)	ARA (Spain)	SPA (Belgium)	ALG (Portugal)	POR (Portugal)	Points

Key
Colour	Result
Gold	Race winner
Silver	2nd place
Bronze	3rd place
Green	Points finish
Blue	Non-points finish
Blue	Non-classified finish (NC)
Purple	Did not finish (Ret)
Black	Disqualified (DSQ)
Black	Excluded (EX)
White	Did not start (DNS)
White	Race cancelled (C)
White	Withdrew (WD)
Blank	Did not participate

**Bold** – Pole

Italics – Fastest lap

=== LMP3 Drivers Championship ===
Pos.	Driver	Team	CAT (Spain)	LEC (France)	ARA (Spain)	SPA (Belgium)	ALG (Portugal)	POR (Portugal)	Points
1	(France) Adrien Chila	(Switzerland) Cool Racing	**1**	3	1	1	4	2	121
1	(Mexico) Alex García	(Switzerland) Cool Racing	**1**	3	1	1	4	2	121
1	(Argentina) Marcos Siebert	(Switzerland) Cool Racing	**1**	3	1	1	4	2	121
2	(Canada) Adam Ali	(Italy) EuroInternational	4	7	5	3	9	1	70
2	(United Kingdom) Matthew Richard Bell	(Italy) EuroInternational	4	7	5	3	9	1	70
3	(Germany) Torsten Kratz	(Germany) WTM by Rinaldi Racing	Ret	**2**	2	EX	1	8	66
3	(Colombia) Óscar Tunjo	(Germany) WTM by Rinaldi Racing	Ret	**2**	2	EX	1	8	66
3	(Germany) Leonard Weiss	(Germany) WTM by Rinaldi Racing	Ret	**2**	2	EX	1	8	66
4	(United Kingdom) Kai Askey	(Poland) Inter Europol Competition	2	6	**Ret**	2	Ret	4	57
4	(United States) Wyatt Brichacek	(Poland) Inter Europol Competition	2	6	**Ret**	2	Ret	4	57
4	(Portugal) Miguel Cristóvão	(Poland) Inter Europol Competition	2	6	**Ret**	2	Ret	4	57
5	(France) Antoine Doquin	(Switzerland) Racing Spirit of Léman	3	1	Ret	8	8	7	54
5	(France) Jacques Wolff	(Switzerland) Racing Spirit of Léman	3	1	Ret	8	8	7	54
6	(United Arab Emirates) Alexander Bukhantsov	(Luxembourg) DKR Engineering	10	5	8	7	3	3	51
6	(Mozambique) Pedro Perino	(Luxembourg) DKR Engineering	10	5	8	7	3	3	51
6	(United Kingdom) James Winslow	(Luxembourg) DKR Engineering	10	5	8	7	3	3	51
7	(Austria) Horst Felbermayr Jr.	(United Kingdom) RLR MSport	9	4	4	6	6	**6**	51
7	(France) Gaël Julien	(United Kingdom) RLR MSport	9	4	4	6	6	**6**	51
7	(Poland) Mateusz Kaprzyk	(United Kingdom) RLR MSport	9	4	4	6	6	**6**	51
8	(France) Jean-Ludovic Foubert	(Switzerland) Racing Spirit of Léman		1	Ret	8	8	7	39
9	(France) Jean-Baptiste Lahaye	(France) Ultimate	7	12	3	Ret	2	Ret	39
9	(France) Matthieu Lahaye	(France) Ultimate	7	12	3	Ret	2	Ret	39
9	(France) Eric Trouillet	(France) Ultimate	7	12	3	Ret	2	Ret	39
10	(Canada) James Dayson	(United Kingdom) RLR MSport	6	9	7	4	5	Ret	38
10	(Denmark) Valdemar Eriksen	(United Kingdom) RLR MSport	6	9	7	4	5	Ret	38
10	(United Kingdom) Jack Manchester	(United Kingdom) RLR MSport	6	9	7	4	5	Ret	38
11	(United Kingdom) Nick Adcock	(Poland) Team Virage	8	8	Ret	**5**	**Ret**	5	30
11	(Portugal) Manuel Espírito Santo	(Poland) Team Virage	8	8	Ret	**5**	**Ret**	5	30
11	(Denmark) Michael Jensen	(Poland) Team Virage	8	8	Ret	**5**	**Ret**	5	30
12	(United Kingdom) Ryan Harper-Ellam	(United Kingdom) Nielsen Racing	5	11	6	Ret	7	Ret	24
12	(United Kingdom) Anthony Wells	(United Kingdom) Nielsen Racing	5	11	6	Ret	7	Ret	24
13	(France) Fabien Michal	(Switzerland) Racing Spirit of Léman	3						15
14	(Netherlands) Glenn van Berlo	(Italy) EuroInternational	Ret	10	Ret	Ret			1
15	(Germany) Matthias Lüthen	(Italy) EuroInternational		10	Ret				1
16	(United Kingdom) Nick Moss	(Italy) EuroInternational	Ret						0
17	(France) François Hériau	(Italy) EuroInternational				Ret			0
Pos.	Driver	Team	CAT (Spain)	LEC (France)	ARA (Spain)	SPA (Belgium)	ALG (Portugal)	POR (Portugal)	Points

Key
Colour	Result
Gold	Race winner
Silver	2nd place
Bronze	3rd place
Green	Points finish
Blue	Non-points finish
Blue	Non-classified finish (NC)
Purple	Did not finish (Ret)
Black	Disqualified (DSQ)
Black	Excluded (EX)
White	Did not start (DNS)
White	Race cancelled (C)
White	Withdrew (WD)
Blank	Did not participate

**Bold** – Pole

Italics – Fastest lap

=== LMGTE Drivers Championship ===
Pos.	Driver	Team	CAT (Spain)	LEC (France)	ARA (Spain)	SPA (Belgium)	ALG (Portugal)	POR (Portugal)	Points
1	(United States) Ryan Hardwick	(Germany) Proton Competition	1	9	2	**3**	2	**1**	105
1	(Belgium) Alessio Picariello	(Germany) Proton Competition	1	9	2	**3**	2	**1**	105
1	(Canada) Zacharie Robichon	(Germany) Proton Competition	1	9	2	**3**	2	**1**	105
2	(France) Julien Andlauer	(Germany) Proton Competition	Ret	**1**	4	8	1	2	85
2	(Italy) Giammarco Levorato	(Germany) Proton Competition	Ret	**1**	4	8	1	2	85
2	(Germany) Christian Ried	(Germany) Proton Competition	Ret	**1**	4	8	1	2	85
3	(Italy) Matteo Cairoli	(Italy) Iron Lynx	4	2	7	1	3	8	80
3	(Italy) Matteo Cressoni	(Italy) Iron Lynx	4	2	7	1	3	8	80
3	(Italy) Claudio Schiavoni	(Italy) Iron Lynx	4	2	7	1	3	8	80
4	(United States) Scott Huffaker	(Switzerland) Kessel Racing	7	4	1	5	4	12	65
4	(Japan) Takeshi Kimura	(Switzerland) Kessel Racing	7	4	1	5	4	12	65
5	(United Kingdom) Duncan Cameron	(Switzerland) Spirit of Race	5	5	6	7	7	3	55
5	(Republic of Ireland) Matt Griffin	(Switzerland) Spirit of Race	5	5	6	7	7	3	55
5	(South Africa) David Perel	(Switzerland) Spirit of Race	5	5	6	7	7	3	55
6	(Australia) Martin Berry	(United Kingdom) JMW Motorsport	**3**	6	**5**	Ret	11	4	47
6	(United Kingdom) Lorcan Hanafin	(United Kingdom) JMW Motorsport	**3**	6	**5**	Ret	11	4	47
6	(United Kingdom) Jon Lancaster	(United Kingdom) JMW Motorsport	**3**	6	**5**	Ret	11	4	47
7	(Denmark) Conrad Laursen	(Denmark) Formula Racing	2	8	Ret	2	12	9	42
7	(Denmark) Johnny Laursen	(Denmark) Formula Racing	2	8	Ret	2	12	9	42
8	(Portugal) Rui Águas	(Italy) AF Corse	6	11	10	4	6	7	35
8	(Greece) Kriton Lendoudis	(Italy) AF Corse	6	11	10	4	6	7	35
8	(Belgium) Ulysse de Pauw	(Italy) AF Corse	6	11	10	4	6	7	35
9	(United Kingdom) Jonathan Adam	(United Kingdom) TF Sport	9	3	11	9	10	6	28
9	(United Kingdom) John Hartshorne	(United Kingdom) TF Sport	9	3	11	9	10	6	28
9	(United Kingdom) Ben Tuck	(United Kingdom) TF Sport	9	3	11	9	10	6	28
10	(France) Valentin Hasse-Clot	(United Kingdom) TF Sport	Ret	7	9	6	**5**	10	28
10	(France) Arnold Robin	(United Kingdom) TF Sport	Ret	7	9	6	**5**	10	28
10	(France) Maxime Robin	(United Kingdom) TF Sport	Ret	7	9	6	**5**	10	28
11	(Italy) Davide Rigon	(Switzerland) Kessel Racing			1				25
12	(Denmark) Nicklas Nielsen	(Denmark) Formula Racing		8	Ret	2	12	9	24
13	(Republic of Ireland) Michael Fassbender	(Germany) Proton Competition	8	10	3	Ret	9	11	22
13	(Austria) Richard Lietz	(Germany) Proton Competition	8	10	3	Ret	9	11	22
13	(Estonia) Martin Rump	(Germany) Proton Competition	8	10	3	Ret	9	11	22
14	(Brazil) Daniel Serra	(Switzerland) Kessel Racing				5	4	12	22
15	(Denmark) Mikkel Mac	(Denmark) Formula Racing	2						18
16	(Denmark) Frederik Schandorff	(Switzerland) Kessel Racing	7	4					18
17	(Denmark) Gustav Birch	(Denmark) GMB Motorsport	Ret	12	8	Ret	8	5	18
17	(Denmark) Jens Reno Møller	(Denmark) GMB Motorsport	Ret	12	8	Ret	8	5	18
17	(Denmark) Nicki Thiim	(Denmark) GMB Motorsport	Ret	12	8	Ret	8	5	18
Pos.	Driver	Team	CAT (Spain)	LEC (France)	ARA (Spain)	SPA (Belgium)	ALG (Portugal)	POR (Portugal)	Points

Key
Colour	Result
Gold	Race winner
Silver	2nd place
Bronze	3rd place
Green	Points finish
Blue	Non-points finish
Blue	Non-classified finish (NC)
Purple	Did not finish (Ret)
Black	Disqualified (DSQ)
Black	Excluded (EX)
White	Did not start (DNS)
White	Race cancelled (C)
White	Withdrew (WD)
Blank	Did not participate

**Bold** – Pole

Italics – Fastest lap

== Teams' Championships ==
Points are awarded according to the following structure:

Position	**1st**	**2nd**	**3rd**	**4th**	**5th**	**6th**	**7th**	**8th**	**9th**	**10th**	**Pole**
Points	25	18	15	12	10	8	6	4	2	1	1

=== Overall Teams Championship ===
Pos.	Team	Car	Category	BAR (Spain)	LEC (France)	ARA (Spain)	SPA (Belgium)	ALG (Portugal)	POR (Portugal)	Points
1	(Portugal) #25 Algarve Pro Racing	Oreca 07	LMP2	8	1	3	**1**	**2**	2	107
2	(United States) #22 United Autosports USA	Oreca 07	LMP2	10	12	**1**	13	1	1	77
3	#34 Racing Team Turkey	Oreca 07	LMP2 Pro/Am	**1**	**3**	**26**	**3**	12	7	65
4	(France) #65 Panis Racing	Oreca 07	LMP2	5	8	4	8	3	3	60
5	(Switzerland) #37 Cool Racing	Oreca 07	LMP2 Pro/Am	4	7	Ret	2	6	5	54
6	(Italy) #83 AF Corse	Oreca 07	LMP2 Pro/Am	3	9	5	5	8	4	53
7	(France) #30 Duqueine Team	Oreca 07	LMP2	2	2	8	28	5	10	51
8	(Switzerland) #47 Cool Racing	Oreca 07	LMP2	**7**	**5**	6	9	4	15	40
9	(France) #28 IDEC Sport	Oreca 07	LMP2	6	6	2	12	9	**14**	37
10	(United Kingdom) #24 Nielsen Racing	Oreca 07	LMP2 Pro/Am	9	10	7	Ret	7	6	23
11	(Poland) #43 Inter Europol Competition	Oreca 07	LMP2	Ret	4	Ret	Ret	37	8	16
12	(United States) #21 United Autosports USA	Oreca 07	LMP2 Pro/Am	16	11	10	4	10	21	15
13	(Poland) #19 Team Virage	Oreca 07	LMP2 Pro/Am	15	NC	13	6	**15**	37	9
14	(Portugal) #20 Algarve Pro Racing	Oreca 07	LMP2 Pro/Am	14	15	11	7	13	13	7
15	(United States) #81 DragonSpeed USA	Oreca 07	LMP2 Pro/Am	13	14	14	10	11	9	3
16	(United Kingdom) #66 JMW Motorsport	Ferrari 488 GTE Evo	LMGTE	**28**	34	**23**	Ret	34	27	2
17	(Poland) #8 Team Virage	Ligier JS P320	LMP3	25	25	Ret	**19**	**Ret**	23	2
18	(Germany) #16 Proton Competition	Porsche 911 RSR-19	LMGTE	26	37	20	**22**	23	**20**	2
19	(Switzerland) #17 Cool Racing	Ligier JS P320	LMP3	**18**	20	16	14	19	17	1
20	(Germany) #12 WTM by Rinaldi Racing	Duqueine M30 - D08	LMP3	Ret	**19**	17	EX	16	35	1
20	(Germany) #77 Proton Competition	Porsche 911 RSR-19	LMGTE	Ret	**29**	22	27	22	22	1
21	(Poland) #13 Inter Europol Competition	Ligier JS P320	LMP3	19	23	**Ret**	15	Ret	19	1
22	(United Kingdom) #72 TF Sport	Aston Martin Vantage AMR	LMGTE	Ret	35	31	25	**26**	33	1
23	(United Kingdom) #15 RLR MSport	Ligier JS P320	LMP3	35	21	25	20	21	**25**	1
23	(Germany) #99 Proton Competition	Oreca 07	LMP2 Pro/Am	12	13	12	Ret	Ret	**12**	1
—	(United States) #23 United Autosports USA (Note: Ineligible to score points in round 3.)	Oreca 07	LMP2 Pro/Am	17	17					—
—	(United States) #23 United Autosports USA	Oreca 07	LMP2			9				—
Pos.	Team	Car	Category	BAR (Spain)	LEC (France)	ARA (Spain)	SPA (Belgium)	ALG (Portugal)	POR (Portugal)	Points

Key
Colour	Result
Gold	Race winner
Silver	2nd place
Bronze	3rd place
Green	Points finish
Blue	Non-points finish
Blue	Non-classified finish (NC)
Purple	Did not finish (Ret)
Black	Disqualified (DSQ)
Black	Excluded (EX)
White	Did not start (DNS)
White	Race cancelled (C)
White	Withdrew (WD)
Blank	Did not participate

**Bold** – Pole

=== LMP2 Teams Championship ===
Pos.	Team	Car	CAT (Spain)	LEC (France)	ARA (Spain)	SPA (Belgium)	ALG (Portugal)	POR (Portugal)	Points
1	(Portugal) #25 Algarve Pro Racing	Oreca 07	5	1	3	**1**	**2**	2	113
2	(United States) #22 United Autosports USA	Oreca 07	6	7	**1**	5	1	1	100
3	(France) #65 Panis Racing	Oreca 07	2	6	4	2	3	3	86
4	(France) #30 Duqueine Team	Oreca 07	1	2	6	6	5	5	79
5	(France) #28 IDEC Sport	Oreca 07	3	5	2	4	6	**6**	72
6	(Switzerland) #47 Cool Racing	Oreca 07	**4**	**4**	5	3	4	7	69
7	(Poland) #43 Inter Europol Competition	Oreca 07	Ret	3	Ret	Ret	7	4	33
Entries ineligible to score points
—	(United States) #23 United Autosports USA	Oreca 07			7				—
Pos.	Team	Car	CAT (Spain)	LEC (France)	ARA (Spain)	SPA (Belgium)	ALG (Portugal)	POR (Portugal)	Points

Key
Colour	Result
Gold	Race winner
Silver	2nd place
Bronze	3rd place
Green	Points finish
Blue	Non-points finish
Blue	Non-classified finish (NC)
Purple	Did not finish (Ret)
Black	Disqualified (DSQ)
Black	Excluded (EX)
White	Did not start (DNS)
White	Race cancelled (C)
White	Withdrew (WD)
Blank	Did not participate

**Bold** – Pole

=== LMP2 Pro/Am Teams Championship ===
Pos.	Team	Car	CAT (Spain)	LEC (France)	ARA (Spain)	SPA (Belgium)	ALG (Portugal)	POR (Portugal)	Points
1	(Italy) #83 AF Corse	Oreca 07	2	3	1	4	3	1	110
2	(Switzerland) #37 Cool Racing	Oreca 07	3	2	Ret	1	1	2	101
3	#34 Racing Team Turkey	Oreca 07	**1**	**1**	**9**	**2**	6	4	94
4	(United Kingdom) #24 Nielsen Racing	Oreca 07	4	4	2	Ret	2	3	75
5	(United States) #21 United Autosports USA	Oreca 07	10	5	3	3	4	9	55
6	(United States) #81 DragonSpeed USA	Oreca 07	7	7	7	7	5	5	44
7	(Portugal) #20 Algarve Pro Racing	Oreca 07	8	8	4	6	7	8	38
8	(Germany) #99 Proton Competition	Oreca 07	6	6	5	Ret	Ret	**7**	33
9	(Luxembourg) #3 DKR Engineering	Oreca 07	5	9	8	8	8	6	32
10	(Poland) #19 Team Virage	Oreca 07	9	NC	6	5	**9**	10	24
11	(United States) #23 United Autosports USA	Oreca 07	11	10					1
Pos.	Team	Car	CAT (Spain)	LEC (France)	ARA (Spain)	SPA (Belgium)	ALG (Portugal)	POR (Portugal)	Points

Key
Colour	Result
Gold	Race winner
Silver	2nd place
Bronze	3rd place
Green	Points finish
Blue	Non-points finish
Blue	Non-classified finish (NC)
Purple	Did not finish (Ret)
Black	Disqualified (DSQ)
Black	Excluded (EX)
White	Did not start (DNS)
White	Race cancelled (C)
White	Withdrew (WD)
Blank	Did not participate

**Bold** – Pole

=== LMP3 Teams Championship ===
Pos.	Team	Car	CAT (Spain)	LEC (France)	ARA (Spain)	SPA (Belgium)	ALG (Portugal)	POR (Portugal)	Points
1	(Switzerland) #17 Cool Racing	Ligier JS P320	**1**	3	1	1	4	2	121
2	(Italy) #11 EuroInternational	Ligier JS P320	4	7	5	3	9	1	70
3	(Germany) #12 WTM by Rinaldi Racing	Duqueine M30 - D08	Ret	**2**	2	EX	1	8	66
4	(Poland) #13 Inter Europol Competition	Ligier JS P320	2	6	**Ret**	2	Ret	4	57
5	(Switzerland) #31 Racing Spirit of Léman	Ligier JS P320	3	1	Ret	8	8	7	54
6	(Luxembourg) #4 DKR Engineering	Duqueine M30 - D08	10	5	8	7	3	3	51
7	(United Kingdom) #15 RLR MSport	Ligier JS P320	9	4	4	6	6	**6**	51
8	(France) #35 Ultimate	Ligier JS P320	7	12	3	Ret	2	Ret	39
9	(United Kingdom) #5 RLR MSport	Ligier JS P320	6	9	7	4	5	Ret	38
10	(Poland) #8 Team Virage	Ligier JS P320	8	8	Ret	**5**	**Ret**	5	30
11	(United Kingdom) #7 Nielsen Racing	Ligier JS P320	5	11	6	Ret	7	Ret	24
12	(Italy) #10 EuroInternational	Ligier JS P320	Ret	10	Ret	Ret			1
Pos.	Team	Car	CAT (Spain)	LEC (France)	ARA (Spain)	SPA (Belgium)	ALG (Portugal)	POR (Portugal)	Points

Key
Colour	Result
Gold	Race winner
Silver	2nd place
Bronze	3rd place
Green	Points finish
Blue	Non-points finish
Blue	Non-classified finish (NC)
Purple	Did not finish (Ret)
Black	Disqualified (DSQ)
Black	Excluded (EX)
White	Did not start (DNS)
White	Race cancelled (C)
White	Withdrew (WD)
Blank	Did not participate

**Bold** – Pole

=== LMGTE Teams Championship ===
Pos.	Team	Car	CAT (Spain)	LEC (France)	ARA (Spain)	SPA (Belgium)	ALG (Portugal)	POR (Portugal)	Points
1	(Germany) #16 Proton Competition	Porsche 911 RSR-19	1	9	2	**3**	2	**1**	105
2	(Germany) #77 Proton Competition	Porsche 911 RSR-19	Ret	**1**	4	8	1	2	85
3	(Italy) #60 Iron Lynx	Porsche 911 RSR-19	4	2	7	1	3	8	80
4	(Switzerland) #57 Kessel Racing	Ferrari 488 GTE Evo	7	4	1	5	4	12	65
5	(Switzerland) #55 Spirit of Race	Ferrari 488 GTE Evo	5	5	6	7	7	3	55
6	(United Kingdom) #66 JMW Motorsport	Ferrari 488 GTE Evo	**3**	6	**5**	Ret	11	4	47
7	(Denmark) #50 Formula Racing	Ferrari 488 GTE Evo	2	8	Ret	2	12	9	42
8	(Italy) #51 AF Corse	Ferrari 488 GTE Evo	6	11	10	4	6	7	35
9	(United Kingdom) #95 TF Sport	Aston Martin Vantage AMR	9	3	11	9	10	6	28
10	(United Kingdom) #72 TF Sport	Aston Martin Vantage AMR	Ret	7	9	6	**5**	10	28
11	(Germany) #93 Proton Competition	Porsche 911 RSR-19	8	10	3	Ret	9	11	22
12	(Denmark) #44 GMB Motorsport	Aston Martin Vantage AMR	Ret	12	8	Ret	8	5	18
Pos.	Team	Car	CAT (Spain)	LEC (France)	ARA (Spain)	SPA (Belgium)	ALG (Portugal)	POR (Portugal)	Points

Key
Colour	Result
Gold	Race winner
Silver	2nd place
Bronze	3rd place
Green	Points finish
Blue	Non-points finish
Blue	Non-classified finish (NC)
Purple	Did not finish (Ret)
Black	Disqualified (DSQ)
Black	Excluded (EX)
White	Did not start (DNS)
White	Race cancelled (C)
White	Withdrew (WD)
Blank	Did not participate

**Bold** – Pole
