= 2023 4 Hours of Portimão =

Endurance sportscar racing event

The layout of the Algarve International Circuit

The 2023 4 Hours of Portimão was an endurance sportscar racing event held between 19 and 22 October 2023, as the sixth and the final round of the 2023 European Le Mans Series season.

== Entry list ==
The entry list was published on 11 October and consisted of 41 entries in 4 categories – 7 in LMP2, 10 in LMP2 Pro/Am, 12 in LMP3 and 12 in LMGTE.

The No. 10 Eurointernational withdrew from competing before the racing weekend.

== Schedule ==
Date	Time (local: WEST)	Event
Thursday, 19 October	9:50	Free Practice 1
Thursday, 19 October	16:20	Bronze Drivers Collective Test
Saturday, 21 October	11:40	Free Practice 2
Saturday, 21 October	17:20	Qualifying - LMGTE
Saturday, 21 October	17:45	Qualifying - LMP3
Saturday, 21 October	18:10	Qualifying - LMP2 Pro/Am
Saturday, 21 October	18:35	Qualifying - LMP2
Sunday, 22 October	13:00	Race

== Free practice ==
- Only the fastest car in each class is shown.

Free Practice 1	Class	No.	Entrant	Time
Free Practice 1	LMP2	25	(Portugal) Algarve Pro Racing	1:33.898
Free Practice 1	LMP2 Pro/Am	21	(United States) United Autosports USA	1:34.023
Free Practice 1	LMP3	13	(Poland) Inter Europol Competition	1:38.649
Free Practice 1	LMGTE	95	(United Kingdom) TF Sport	1:42.409
Free Practice 2	LMP2	25	(Portugal) Algarve Pro Racing	1:32.957
Free Practice 2	LMP2 Pro/Am	24	(United Kingdom) Nielsen Racing	1:33.152
Free Practice 2	LMP3	8	(Poland) Team Virage	1:38.047
Free Practice 2	LMGTE	44	(Denmark) GMB Motorsport	1:41.053

== Qualifying ==
Pole position winners in each class are marked in bold.

Pos	Class	No.	Team	Driver	Time	Gap	Grid
1	**LMP2**	**28**	**(France) IDEC Sport**	**(France) Paul-Loup Chatin**	**1:36.153**	—	1
2	LMP2	22	(United States) United Autosports USA	(United Kingdom) Oliver Jarvis	1:36.726	+0.573	2
3	LMP2	65	(France) Panis Racing	(Netherlands) Job van Uitert	1:37.009	+0.856	3
4	LMP2	25	(Portugal) Algarve Pro Racing	(Australia) James Allen	1:37.274	+1.121	4
5	LMP2	43	(Poland) Inter Europol Competition	(United Kingdom) Olli Caldwell	1:38.338	+2.185	5
6	LMP2	30	(France) Duqueine Team	(Switzerland) Neel Jani	1:38.955	+2.802	6
7	LMP2	47	(Switzerland) Cool Racing	Vladislav Lomko	1:42.087	+5.934	7
8	**LMP2 Pro/Am**	**99**	**(Germany) Proton Competition**	**(Italy) Giorgio Roda**	**1:47.179**	**+11.026**	8
9	LMP2 Pro/Am	34	Racing Team Turkey	(Turkey) Salih Yoluç	1:47.316	+11.163	9
10	LMP2 Pro/Am	3	(Luxembourg) DKR Engineering	(Belgium) Tom van Rompuy	1:47.504	+11.351	10
11	**LMP3**	**15**	**(United Kingdom) RLR M Sport**	**(France) Gaël Julien**	**1:48.519**	**+12.366**	18
12	LMP3	17	(Switzerland) Cool Racing	(Argentina) Marcos Siebert	1:48.985	+12.832	19
13	LMP3	11	(Italy) Eurointernational	(Canada) Adam Ali	1:48.992	+12.839	20
14	LMP3	35	(France) Ultimate	(France) Jean-Baptiste Lahaye	1:49.294	+13.141	21
15	LMP3	31	(Switzerland) Racing Spirit of Léman	(France) Antoine Doquin	1:49.421	+13.268	22
16	LMP2 Pro/Am	19	(Poland) Team Virage	(Germany) Alexander Mattschull	1:50.256	+14.103	11
17	LMP2 Pro/Am	20	(Portugal) Algarve Pro Racing	(United States) Fred Poordad	1:50.363	+14.210	12
18	LMP2 Pro/Am	81	(United States) DragonSpeed USA	(Sweden) Henrik Hedman	1:50.918	+14.765	13
19	LMP3	13	(Poland) Inter Europol Competition	(United Kingdom) Kai Askey	1:51.161	+15.008	23
20	LMP3	12	(Germany) WTM by Rinaldi Racing	(Colombia) Óscar Tunjo	1:52.268	+16.115	24
21	LMP3	7	(United Kingdom) Nielsen Racing	(United Kingdom) Ryan Harper-Ellam	1:52.389	+16.236	25
22	LMP3	8	(Poland) Team Virage	(Portugal) Manuel Espírito Santo	1:52.430	+16.277	26
23	LMP3	4	(Luxembourg) DKR Engineering	(Portugal) Pedro Perino	1:52.757	+16.604	27
24	LMP2 Pro/Am	83	(Italy) AF Corse	(France) François Perrodo	1:53.272	+17.119	14
25	LMP2 Pro/Am	21	(United States) United Autosports USA	(Brazil) Daniel Schneider	1:53.298	+17.145	15
26	LMP2 Pro/Am	24	(United Kingdom) Nielsen Racing	(United States) Rodrigo Sales	1:53.409	+17.256	16
27	LMP3	5	(United Kingdom) RLR M Sport	(Denmark) Valdemar Eriksen	1:54.367	+18.214	28
28	LMP2 Pro/Am	37	(Switzerland) Cool Racing	(Switzerland) Alexandre Coigny	1:55.269	+19.116	17
29	**LMGTE**	**16**	**(Germany) Proton Competition**	**(United States) Ryan Hardwick**	**1:58.574**	**+22.421**	29
30	LMGTE	57	(Switzerland) Kessel Racing	(Japan) Takeshi Kimura	1:58.837	+22.684	30
31	LMGTE	77	(Germany) Proton Competition	(Germany) Christian Ried	1:58.971	+22.818	31
32	LMGTE	55	(Switzerland) Spirit of Race	(United Kingdom) Duncan Cameron	1:59.149	+22.996	32
33	LMGTE	44	(Denmark) GMB Motorsport	(Denmark) Jens Møller	1:59.598	+23.445	33
34	LMGTE	66	(United Kingdom) JMW Motorsport	(Singapore) Martin Berry	2:00.232	+24.079	34
35	LMGTE	93	(Germany) Proton Competition	(Republic of Ireland) Michael Fassbender	2:00.460	+24.307	35
36	LMGTE	72	(United Kingdom) TF Sport	(France) Arnold Robin	2:00.644	+24.491	36
37	LMGTE	50	(Denmark) Formula Racing	(Denmark) Johnny Laursen	2:00.682	+24.529	37
38	LMGTE	95	(United Kingdom) TF Sport	(United Kingdom) John Hartshorne	2:00.809	+24.656	38
39	LMGTE	51	(Italy) AF Corse	(Greece) Kriton Lendoudis	2:02.247	+26.094	39
40	LMGTE	60	(Italy) Iron Lynx	(Italy) Claudio Schiavoni	2:04.130	+27.977	40

== Race ==
=== Race result ===
The minimum number of laps for classification (70% of overall winning car's distance) was 67 laps. Class winners are marked in bold.

Final Classification
Pos	Class	No	Team	Drivers	Car	Tyres	Laps	Time/Gap
1	**LMP2**	**22**	**(United States) United Autosports USA**	**(Japan) Marino Sato (United Kingdom) Philip Hanson (United Kingdom) Oliver Jarvis**	**Oreca 07**	G	**97**	**4:01:25.355**
2	LMP2	25	(Portugal) Algarve Pro Racing	(Barbados) Kyffin Simpson (Australia) James Allen (United Kingdom) Alexander Lynn	Oreca 07	G	97	+5.785
3	LMP2	65	(France) Panis Racing	(Netherlands) Job van Uitert (United Kingdom) Manuel Maldonado (Netherlands) Tijmen van der Helm	Oreca 07	G	97	+5.918
4	**LMP2 Pro/Am**	**83**	**(Italy) AF Corse**	**(France) François Perrodo (France) Matthieu Vaxivière (United Kingdom) Ben Barnicoat**	**Oreca 07**	G	**97**	**+6.970**
5	LMP2 Pro/Am	37	(Switzerland) Cool Racing	(Switzerland) Alexandre Coigny (Denmark) Malthe Jakobsen (France) Nicolas Lapierre	Oreca 07	G	97	+7.601
6	LMP2 Pro/Am	24	(United Kingdom) Nielsen Racing	(United States) Rodrigo Sales (United Kingdom) Ben Hanley (Switzerland) Mathias Beche	Oreca 07	G	97	+24.308
7	LMP2 Pro/Am	34	Racing Team Turkey	(Turkey) Salih Yoluç (Republic of Ireland) Charlie Eastwood (Switzerland) Louis Delétraz	Oreca 07	G	97	+25.121
8	LMP2	43	(Poland) Inter Europol Competition	(Angola) Rui Andrade (United Kingdom) Olli Caldwell (South Africa) Jonathan Aberdein	Oreca 07	G	97	+36.269
9	LMP2 Pro/Am	81	(United States) DragonSpeed USA	(Sweden) Henrik Hedman (Colombia) Sebastián Montoya (Colombia) Juan Pablo Montoya	Oreca 07	G	97	+37.183
10	LMP2	30	(France) Duqueine Team	(United Kingdom) Nicolás Pino (Austria) René Binder (Switzerland) Neel Jani	Oreca 07	G	97	+37.881
11	LMP2 Pro/Am	3	(Luxembourg) DKR Engineering	(Belgium) Tom van Rompuy (United Kingdom) Sebastián Álvarez (France) Nathanaël Berthon	Oreca 07	G	97	+38.498
12	LMP2 Pro/Am	99	(Germany) Proton Competition	(Italy) Giorgio Roda (Germany) Jonas Ried (Netherlands) Bent Viscaal	Oreca 07	G	97	+1:06.800
13	LMP2 Pro/Am	20	(Portugal) Algarve Pro Racing	(United States) Fred Poordad (France) Tristan Vautier (United Kingdom) Jack Hawksworth	Oreca 07	G	96	+1 Lap
14	LMP2	28	(France) IDEC Sport	(France) Paul Lafargue (France) Paul-Loup Chatin (Germany) Laurents Hörr	Oreca 07	G	95	+2 Laps
15	LMP2	47	(Switzerland) Cool Racing	Vladislav Lomko (France) Reshad de Gerus (Argentina) José María López	Oreca 07	G	95	+2 Laps
16	**LMP3**	**11**	**(Italy) Eurointernational**	**(United Kingdom) Matthew Richard Bell (Canada) Adam Ali**	**Ligier JS P320**	MI	**94**	**+3 Laps**
17	LMP3	17	(Switzerland) Cool Racing	(France) Adrien Chila (Argentina) Marcos Siebert (Mexico) Alejandro Garcia	Ligier JS P320	MI	93	+4 Laps
18	LMP3	4	(Luxembourg) DKR Engineering	(United Arab Emirates) Alexander Bukhantsov (United Kingdom) James Winslow (Portugal) Pedro Perino	Duqueine M30 – D08	MI	93	+4 Laps
19	LMP3	13	(Poland) Inter Europol Competition	(Portugal) Miguel Cristóvão (United Kingdom) Kai Askey (United States) Wyatt Brichacek	Ligier JS P320	MI	93	+4 Laps
20	**LMGTE**	**16**	**(Germany) Proton Competition**	**(United States) Ryan Hardwick (Canada) Zacharie Robichon (Belgium) Alessio Picariello**	**Porsche 911 RSR-19**	G	**93**	**+4 Laps**
21	LMP2 Pro/Am	21	(United States) United Autosports USA	(Brazil) Daniel Schneider (United Kingdom) Andrew Meyrick (Brazil) Nelson Piquet Jr.	Oreca 07	G	93	+4 Laps
22	LMGTE	77	(Germany) Proton Competition	(Germany) Christian Ried (Italy) Giammarco Levorato (France) Julien Andlauer	Porsche 911 RSR-19	G	93	+4 Laps
23	LMP3	8	(Poland) Team Virage	(South Africa) Michael Jensen (United Kingdom) Nick Adcock (Portugal) Manuel Espírito Santo	Ligier JS P320	MI	93	+4 Laps
24	LMGTE	55	(Switzerland) Spirit of Race	(United Kingdom) Duncan Cameron (South Africa) David Perel (Republic of Ireland) Matt Griffin	Ferrari 488 GTE Evo	G	93	+4 Laps
25	LMP3	15	(United Kingdom) RLR M Sport	(Austria) Horst Felbermayr Jr (France) Gaël Julien (Poland) Mateusz Kaprzyk	Ligier JS P320	MI	93	+4 Laps
26	LMP3	31	(Switzerland) Racing Spirit of Léman	(France) Jacques Wolff (France) Jean-Ludovic Foubert (France) Antoine Doquin	Ligier JS P320	MI	93	+4 Laps (Note: The No. 31 Racing Spirit of Léman was penalised for not serving 10 seconds time penalty during a pit stop. The penalty was a drive through converted to 30 seconds added to crew's total race time.)
27	LMGTE	66	(United Kingdom) JMW Motorsport	(Singapore) Martin Berry (United Kingdom) Lorcan Hanafin (United Kingdom) Jon Lancaster	Ferrari 488 GTE Evo	G	93	+4 Laps
28	LMGTE	44	(Denmark) GMB Motorsport	(Denmark) Jens Møller (Denmark) Gustav Birch (Denmark) Nicki Thiim	Aston Martin Vantage AMR	G	93	+4 Laps (Note: The No. 44 GMB Motorsport was penalised for not meeting the minimum driving time of Nicki Thiim. Thiim missed 16.743 seconds to meet stipulated time. The penalty was 17 seconds Stop & Go converted to 52 seconds added to crew's total race time.)
29	LMGTE	95	(United Kingdom) TF Sport	(United Kingdom) John Hartshorne (United Kingdom) Ben Tuck (United Kingdom) Jonathan Adam	Aston Martin Vantage AMR	G	92	+5 Laps
30	LMGTE	51	(Italy) AF Corse	(Greece) Kriton Lendoudis (Portugal) Rui Águas (Belgium) Ulysse de Pauw	Ferrari 488 GTE Evo	G	92	+5 Laps (Note: The No. 51 AF Corse was penalised for not meeting the minimum driving time of Ulysse de Pauw. De Pauw missed 1 minute and 32.251 seconds to meet stipulated time. The penalty was 1 minute 32.251 seconds converted to subtraction of 1 lap and adding 24.148 seconds added to crew's total race time.)
31	LMGTE	60	(Italy) Iron Lynx	(Italy) Claudio Schiavoni (Italy) Matteo Cressoni (Italy) Matteo Cairoli	Porsche 911 RSR-19	G	92	+5 Laps
32	LMGTE	50	(Denmark) Formula Racing	(Denmark) Johnny Laursen (Denmark) Conrad Laursen (Denmark) Nicklas Nielsen	Ferrari 488 GTE Evo	G	92	+5 Laps (Note: The No. 50 Formula Racing was penalised for not meeting the minimum driving time of Nicklas Nielsen. Nielsen missed 1 minute and 56.028 seconds to meet stipulated time. The penalty was subtracting 1 lap and adding 47.925 seconds added to crew's total race time.)
33	LMGTE	72	(United Kingdom) TF Sport	(France) Arnold Robin (France) Maxime Robin (France) Valentin Hasse-Clot	Aston Martin Vantage AMR	G	91	+6 Laps
34	LMGTE	93	(Germany) Proton Competition	(Republic of Ireland) Michael Fassbender (Estonia) Martin Rump (Austria) Richard Lietz	Porsche 911 RSR-19	G	91	+6 Laps
35	LMP3	12	(Germany) WTM by Rinaldi Racing	(Germany) Torsten Kratz (Germany) Leonard Weiss (Colombia) Óscar Tunjo	Duqueine M30 – D08	MI	90	+7 Laps (Note: The No. 12 WTM by Rinaldi Racing was penalised for a pit stop infringement. The penalty was 10 seconds added to crew's total race time.)
36	LMGTE	57	(Switzerland) Kessel Racing	(Japan) Takeshi Kimura (United States) Scott Huffaker (Brazil) Daniel Serra	Ferrari 488 GTE Evo	G	87	+10 Laps
37	LMP2 Pro/Am	19	(Poland) Team Virage	(Germany) Alexander Mattschull (Guatemala) Ian Rodríguez (Colombia) Tatiana Calderón	Oreca 07	G	82	+15 Laps
Not classified
	LMP3	5	(United Kingdom) RLR M Sport	(Canada) James Dayson (Denmark) Valdemar Eriksen (United Kingdom) Jack Manchester	Ligier JS P320	MI	81	
	LMP3	35	(France) Ultimate	(France) Eric Trouillet (France) Matthieu Lahaye (France) Jean-Baptiste Lahaye	Ligier JS P320	MI	66	
	LMP3	7	(United Kingdom) Nielsen Racing	(United Kingdom) Anthony Wells (United Kingdom) Ryan Harper-Ellam	Ligier JS P320	MI	49	

=== Statistics ===
==== Fastest lap ====
Class	Driver	Team	Time	Lap
LMP2	(Netherlands) Job van Uitert	(France) #65 Panis Racing	1:35.475	77
LMP2 Pro/Am	(Guatemala) Ian Rodríguez	(Poland) #19 Team Virage	1:35.854	77
LMP3	(Argentina) Marcos Siebert	(Switzerland) #17 Cool Racing	1:41.421	90
LMGTE	(Brazil) Daniel Serra	(Switzerland) #57 Kessel Racing	1:43,103	87
