= 2023 4 Hours of Spa-Francorchamps =

Endurance sportscar racing event

The layout of the Circuit de Spa-Francorchamps

The 2023 4 Hours of Spa-Francorchamps was an endurance sportscar racing event held between 22 and 24 September 2023, as the fourth round of the 2023 European Le Mans Series season.

== Entry list ==
The pre-event entry list consisted of 41 entries in 4 categories – 7 in LMP2, 10 in LMP2 Pro/Am, 12 in LMP3 and 12 in LMGTE. In comparison to the previous round one car was missing – the No. 23 United Autosports USA was withdrawn for the rest of the season due to Jim McGuire's injury.

Alessio Rovera stayed in the No. 83 AF Corse entry after replacing Ben Barnicoat at Aragón. Bent Viscaal was kept in crew of the No. 20 Algarve Pro Racing after replacing Jack Hawksworth in previous round. Nelson Piquet Jr. came back to the No. 21 United Autosports USA after missing previous race. Tom van Rompuy also missed previous round and came back to the car No. 3 of DKR Engineering. François Heriau joined Glenn van Berlo in the No. 10 Eurointernational. Daniel Serra joined the No. 57 Kessel Racing.

== Schedule ==
Date	Time (local: CEST)	Event
Friday, 22 September	11:00	Free Practice 1
Friday, 22 September	14:45	Bronze Drivers Collective Test
Saturday, 23 September	10:15	Free Practice 2
Saturday, 23 September	14:05	Qualifying - LMGTE
Saturday, 23 September	14:30	Qualifying - LMP3
Saturday, 23 September	14:55	Qualifying - LMP2 Pro/Am
Saturday, 23 September	15:20	Qualifying - LMP2
Sunday, 24 September	11:30	Race

== Free practice ==
- Only the fastest car in each class is shown.

Free Practice 1	Class	No.	Entrant	Time
Free Practice 1	LMP2	22	(United States) United Autosports USA	2:05.030
Free Practice 1	LMP2 Pro/Am	37	(Switzerland) Cool Racing	2:05.060
Free Practice 1	LMP3	31	(Switzerland) Racing Spirit of Léman	2:12.789
Free Practice 1	LMGTE	60	(Italy) Iron Lynx	2:16.741
Free Practice 2	LMP2	43	(Poland) Inter Europol Competition	2:04.530
Free Practice 2	LMP2 Pro/Am	21	(United States) United Autosports USA	2:05.630
Free Practice 2	LMP3	8	(Poland) Team Virage	2:12.212
Free Practice 2	LMGTE	60	(Italy) Iron Lynx	2:17.096

== Qualifying ==
Pole position winners in each class are marked in bold.

Pos	Class	No.	Team	Driver	Time	Gap	Grid
1	**LMP2**	**25**	**(Portugal) Algarve Pro Racing**	**(United Kingdom) Alexander Lynn**	**2:03.564**	—	1
2	LMP2	22	(United States) United Autosports USA	(United Kingdom) Philip Hanson	2:03.672	+0.108	2
3	LMP2	28	(France) IDEC Sport	(Germany) Laurents Hörr	2:03.789	+0.225	3
4	LMP2	30	(France) Duqueine Team	(Austria) René Binder	2:04.197	+0.633	4
5	LMP2	43	(Poland) Inter Europol Competition	(South Africa) Jonathan Aberdein	2:04.211	+0.647	5
6	LMP2	65	(France) Panis Racing	(Netherlands) Job van Uitert	2:04.350	+0.786	6
7	LMP2	47	(Switzerland) Cool Racing	Vladislav Lomko	2:05.013	+1.449	7
8	**LMP2 Pro/Am**	**34**	**Racing Team Turkey**	**(Turkey) Salih Yoluç**	**2:05.221**	**+1.657**	8
9	LMP2 Pro/Am	99	(Germany) Proton Competition	(Italy) Giorgio Roda	2:05.874	+2.310	9
10	LMP2 Pro/Am	3	(Luxembourg) DKR Engineering	(Belgium) Tom van Rompuy	2:07.112	+3.548	10
11	LMP2 Pro/Am	37	(Switzerland) Cool Racing	(Switzerland) Alexandre Coigny	2:07.307	+3.743	11
12	LMP2 Pro/Am	24	(United Kingdom) Nielsen Racing	(United States) Rodrigo Sales	2:07.852	+4.288	12
13	LMP2 Pro/Am	19	(Poland) Team Virage	(Germany) Alexander Mattschull	2:07.977	+4.413	16 (Note: The No. 19 Team Virage lost 3 positions on the grid for impeding car No. 24 of Nielsen Racing.)
14	LMP2 Pro/Am	83	(Italy) AF Corse	(France) François Perrodo	2:08.104	+4.540	13
15	LMP2 Pro/Am	21	(United States) United Autosports USA	(Brazil) Daniel Schneider	2:08.483	+4.919	14
16	LMP2 Pro/Am	81	(United States) DragonSpeed USA	(Sweden) Henrik Hedman	2:09.700	+6.136	15
17	**LMP3**	**8**	**(Poland) Team Virage**	**(Portugal) Manuel Espírito Santo**	**2:11.285**	**+7.721**	17
18	LMP2 Pro/Am	20	(Portugal) Algarve Pro Racing	(United States) Fred Poordad	2:11.461	+7.897	18
19	LMP3	7	(United Kingdom) Nielsen Racing	(United Kingdom) Ryan Harper-Ellam	2:11.630	+8.066	19
20	LMP3	10	(Italy) Eurointernational	(Netherlands) Glenn van Berlo	2:11.943	+8.379	20
21	LMP3	17	(Switzerland) Cool Racing	(Argentina) Marcos Siebert	2:11.978	+8.414	21
22	LMP3	31	(Switzerland) Racing Spirit of Léman	(France) Antoine Doquin	2:12.064	+8.500	22
23	LMP3	11	(Italy) Eurointernational	(Canada) Adam Ali	2:12.124	+8.560	23
24	LMP3	13	(Poland) Inter Europol Competition	(United States) Wyatt Brichacek	2:12.520	+8.956	24
25	LMP3	15	(United Kingdom) RLR M Sport	(France) Gaël Julien	2:12.523	+8.959	25
26	LMP3	4	(Luxembourg) DKR Engineering	(United Kingdom) James Winslow	2:12.574	+9.010	26
27	LMP3	35	(France) Ultimate	(France) Matthieu Lahaye	2:12.856	+9.292	27
28	LMP3	5	(United Kingdom) RLR M Sport	(Denmark) Valdemar Eriksen	2:13.328	+9.764	28
29	**LMGTE**	**16**	**(Germany) Proton Competition**	**(United States) Ryan Hardwick**	**2:17.385**	**+13.821**	29
30	LMGTE	72	(United Kingdom) TF Sport	(France) Arnold Robin	2:18.039	+14.475	30
31	LMGTE	66	(United Kingdom) JMW Motorsport	(Singapore) Martin Berry	2:18.362	+14.798	31
32	LMGTE	44	(Denmark) GMB Motorsport	(Denmark) Jens Møller	2:18.436	+14.872	32
33	LMGTE	93	(Germany) Proton Competition	(Republic of Ireland) Michael Fassbender	2:18.568	+15.004	33
34	LMGTE	55	(Switzerland) Spirit of Race	(United Kingdom) Duncan Cameron	2:18.817	+15.253	34
35	LMGTE	50	(Denmark) Formula Racing	(Denmark) Johnny Laursen	2:18.914	+15.350	35
36	LMGTE	57	(Switzerland) Kessel Racing	(Japan) Takeshi Kimura	2:18.919	+15.355	36
37	LMGTE	77	(Germany) Proton Competition	(Germany) Christian Ried	2:19.002	+15.438	37
38	LMGTE	51	(Italy) AF Corse	(Greece) Kriton Lendoudis	2:20.341	+16.777	38
39	LMGTE	60	(Italy) Iron Lynx	(Italy) Claudio Schiavoni	2:20.658	+17.094	39
40	LMGTE	95	(United Kingdom) TF Sport	(United Kingdom) John Hartshorne	2:20.811	+17.247	40
DSQ	LMP3	12	(Germany) WTM by Rinaldi Racing	(Colombia) Óscar Tunjo	2:10.554	+6.990	– (Note: The No. 12 WTM by Rinaldi Racing was disqualified and excluded from the race meeting because Torsten Kratz, bronze-rated driver, did not participate in any practice session.)

== Race ==
=== Race result ===
The minimum number of laps for classification (70% of overall winning car's distance) was 61 laps. Class winners are marked in bold.

Final Classification
Pos	Class	No	Team	Drivers	Car	Tyres	Laps	Time/Gap
1	**LMP2**	**25**	**(Portugal) Algarve Pro Racing**	**(Barbados) Kyffin Simpson (Australia) James Allen (United Kingdom) Alexander Lynn**	**Oreca 07**	G	**88**	**4:00:13.458**
2	**LMP2 Pro/Am**	**37**	**(Switzerland) Cool Racing**	**(Switzerland) Alexandre Coigny (Denmark) Malthe Jakobsen (France) Nicolas Lapierre**	**Oreca 07**	G	**88**	**+1.811**
3	LMP2 Pro/Am	34	Racing Team Turkey	(Turkey) Salih Yoluç (Republic of Ireland) Charlie Eastwood (Switzerland) Louis Delétraz	Oreca 07	G	88	+5.674 (Note: The No. 34 Racing Team Turkey was penalised for prematurely accelerating during Full Course Yellow. The penalty was 2 seconds added to crew's total race time.)
4	LMP2 Pro/Am	21	(United States) United Autosports USA	(Brazil) Daniel Schneider (United Kingdom) Andrew Meyrick (Brazil) Nelson Piquet Jr.	Oreca 07	G	88	+6.431
5	LMP2 Pro/Am	83	(Italy) AF Corse	(France) François Perrodo (France) Matthieu Vaxivière (Italy) Alessio Rovera	Oreca 07	G	88	+7.033 (Note: The No. 83 AF Corse was penalised for prematurely accelerating during Full Course Yellow. The penalty was 4 seconds added to crew's total race time.)
6	LMP2 Pro/Am	19	(Poland) Team Virage	(Germany) Alexander Mattschull (Guatemala) Ian Rodríguez (Colombia) Tatiana Calderón	Oreca 07	G	88	+9.238
7	LMP2 Pro/Am	20	(Portugal) Algarve Pro Racing	(United States) Fred Poordad (France) Tristan Vautier (Netherlands) Bent Viscaal	Oreca 07	G	88	+11.178
8	LMP2	65	(France) Panis Racing	(Netherlands) Job van Uitert (United Kingdom) Manuel Maldonado (Netherlands) Tijmen van der Helm	Oreca 07	G	88	+31.808
9	LMP2	47	(Switzerland) Cool Racing	Vladislav Lomko (France) Reshad de Gerus (Argentina) José María López	Oreca 07	G	88	+48.302
10	LMP2 Pro/Am	81	(United States) DragonSpeed USA	(Sweden) Henrik Hedman (Colombia) Sebastián Montoya (Colombia) Juan Pablo Montoya	Oreca 07	G	88	+49.343 (Note: The No. 81 DragonSpeed USA was penalised for unsafe release in the pit lane and causing a collision with the No. 16 Proton Competition. The penalty was 10 seconds added to the next pit stop but it was converted into 10 seconds added to crew's total race time.)
11	LMP2 Pro/Am	3	(Luxembourg) DKR Engineering	(Belgium) Tom van Rompuy (United Kingdom) Sebastián Álvarez (France) Nathanaël Berthon	Oreca 07	G	88	+1:07.298
12	LMP2	28	(France) IDEC Sport	(France) Paul Lafargue (France) Paul-Loup Chatin (Germany) Laurents Hörr	Oreca 07	G	87	+1 Lap
13	LMP2	22	(United States) United Autosports USA	(Japan) Marino Sato (United Kingdom) Philip Hanson (United Kingdom) Oliver Jarvis	Oreca 07	G	86	+2 Laps
14	**LMP3**	**17**	**(Switzerland) Cool Racing**	**(France) Adrien Chila (Argentina) Marcos Siebert (Mexico) Alejandro Garcia**	**Ligier JS P320**	MI	**86**	**+2 Laps**
15	LMP3	13	(Poland) Inter Europol Competition	(Portugal) Miguel Cristóvão (United Kingdom) Kai Askey (United States) Wyatt Brichacek	Ligier JS P320	MI	86	+2 Laps
16	LMP3	11	(Italy) Eurointernational	(United Kingdom) Matthew Richard Bell (Canada) Adam Ali	Ligier JS P320	MI	86	+2 Laps
17	LMP3	5	(United Kingdom) RLR M Sport	(Canada) James Dayson (Denmark) Valdemar Eriksen (United Kingdom) Jack Manchester	Ligier JS P320	MI	86	+2 Laps
18	**LMGTE**	**60**	**(Italy) Iron Lynx**	**(Italy) Claudio Schiavoni (Italy) Matteo Cressoni (Italy) Matteo Cairoli**	**Porsche 911 RSR-19**	G	**86**	**+2 Laps**
19	LMP3	8	(Poland) Team Virage	(South Africa) Michael Jensen (United Kingdom) Nick Adcock (Portugal) Manuel Espírito Santo	Ligier JS P320	MI	86	+2 Laps
20	LMP3	15	(United Kingdom) RLR M Sport	(Austria) Horst Felbermayr Jr (France) Gaël Julien (Poland) Mateusz Kaprzyk	Ligier JS P320	MI	86	+2 Laps
21	LMGTE	50	(Denmark) Formula Racing	(Denmark) Johnny Laursen (Denmark) Conrad Laursen (Denmark) Nicklas Nielsen	Ferrari 488 GTE Evo	G	86	+2 Laps
22	LMGTE	16	(Germany) Proton Competition	(United States) Ryan Hardwick (Canada) Zacharie Robichon (Belgium) Alessio Picariello	Porsche 911 RSR-19	G	86	+2 Laps (Note: The No. 16 Proton Competition was penalised for prematurely accelerating during Full Course Yellow. The penalty was 10 seconds added to crew's total race time.)
23	LMGTE	51	(Italy) AF Corse	(Greece) Kriton Lendoudis (Portugal) Rui Águas (Belgium) Ulysse de Pauw	Ferrari 488 GTE Evo	G	86	+2 Laps
24	LMGTE	57	(Switzerland) Kessel Racing	(Japan) Takeshi Kimura (United States) Scott Huffaker (Brazil) Daniel Serra	Ferrari 488 GTE Evo	G	86	+2 Laps
25	LMGTE	72	(United Kingdom) TF Sport	(France) Arnold Robin (France) Maxime Robin (France) Valentin Hasse-Clot	Aston Martin Vantage AMR	G	86	+2 Laps
26	LMGTE	55	(Switzerland) Spirit of Race	(United Kingdom) Duncan Cameron (South Africa) David Perel (Republic of Ireland) Matt Griffin	Ferrari 488 GTE Evo	G	86	+2 Laps
27	LMGTE	77	(Germany) Proton Competition	(Germany) Christian Ried (Italy) Giammarco Levorato (France) Julien Andlauer	Porsche 911 RSR-19	G	86	+2 Laps (Note: The No. 77 Proton Competition was penalised twice. The first penalty was 30 seconds for constant abuse of track limits. The second penalty was also 30 seconds for causing a collision with the No. 35 Ultimate.)
28	LMP2	30	(France) Duqueine Team	(United Kingdom) Nicolás Pino (Austria) René Binder (Switzerland) Neel Jani	Oreca 07	G	85	+3 Laps
29	LMGTE	95	(United Kingdom) TF Sport	(United Kingdom) John Hartshorne (United Kingdom) Ben Tuck (United Kingdom) Jonathan Adam	Aston Martin Vantage AMR	G	85	+3 Laps
30	LMP3	4	(Luxembourg) DKR Engineering	(United Arab Emirates) Alexander Bukhantsov (United Kingdom) James Winslow (Portugal) Pedro Perino	Duqueine M30 – D08	MI	79	+9 Laps
31	LMP3	31	(Switzerland) Racing Spirit of Léman	(France) Jacques Wolff (France) Jean-Ludovic Foubert (France) Antoine Doquin	Ligier JS P320	MI	76	+12 Laps
Not classified
	LMP3	35	(France) Ultimate	(France) Eric Trouillet (France) Matthieu Lahaye (France) Jean-Baptiste Lahaye	Ligier JS P320	MI	83	
	LMP2	43	(Poland) Inter Europol Competition	(Angola) Rui Andrade (United Kingdom) Olli Caldwell (South Africa) Jonathan Aberdein	Oreca 07	G	81	
	LMP2 Pro/Am	24	(United Kingdom) Nielsen Racing	(United States) Rodrigo Sales (United Kingdom) Ben Hanley (Switzerland) Mathias Beche	Oreca 07	G	75	
	LMGTE	44	(Denmark) GMB Motorsport	(Denmark) Jens Møller (Denmark) Gustav Birch (Denmark) Nicki Thiim	Aston Martin Vantage AMR	G	64	
	LMP3	10	(Italy) Eurointernational	(France) François Heriau (Netherlands) Glenn van Berlo	Ligier JS P320	MI	55	
	LMGTE	66	(United Kingdom) JMW Motorsport	(Singapore) Martin Berry (United Kingdom) Lorcan Hanafin (United Kingdom) Jon Lancaster	Ferrari 488 GTE Evo	G	35	
	LMGTE	93	(Germany) Proton Competition	(Republic of Ireland) Michael Fassbender (Estonia) Martin Rump (Austria) Richard Lietz	Porsche 911 RSR-19	G	34	
	LMP3	7	(United Kingdom) Nielsen Racing	(United Kingdom) Anthony Wells (United Kingdom) Ryan Harper-Ellam	Ligier JS P320	MI	31	
	LMP2 Pro/Am	99	(Germany) Proton Competition	(Italy) Giorgio Roda (Germany) Jonas Ried (Italy) Gianmaria Bruni	Oreca 07	G	30	

=== Statistics ===
==== Fastest lap ====
Class	Driver	Team	Time	Lap
LMP2	(Barbados) Kyffin Simpson	(Portugal) #25 Algarve Pro Racing	2:06.150	8
LMP2 Pro/Am	(Denmark) Malthe Jakobsen	(Switzerland) #37 Cool Racing	2:06.042	70
LMP3	(United Kingdom) Matthew Richard Bell	(Italy) #11 Eurointernational	2:13.990	16
LMGTE	(France) Julien Andlauer	(Germany) #77 Proton Competition	2:17.686	46
