= 2023 4 Hours of Le Castellet =

Endurance sportscar racing event

The layout of the Circuit Paul Ricard

The 2023 4 Hours of Le Castellet was an endurance sportscar racing event held between 14 and 16 July 2023, as the second round of the 2023 European Le Mans Series season.

== Entry list ==
The pre-event entry list consisted of 42 entries in 4 categories - 7 in LMP2, 11 in LMP2 Pro/Am, 12 in LMP3 and 12 in LMGTE.

Mathias Lüthen replaced Nick Moss in the No. 10 Eurointernational. In the No. 31 Racing Spirit of Léman Fabien Michal was replaced by Jean-Ludovic Foubert. Nicklas Nielsen replaced Mikkel Mac in the No. 50 Formula Racing.

== Schedule ==
Date	Time (local: CEST)	Event
Friday, 14 July	11:40	Free Practice 1
Friday, 14 July	15:50	Bronze Drivers Collective Test
Saturday, 15 July	10:10	Free Practice 2
Saturday, 15 July	14:30	Qualifying - LMGTE
Saturday, 15 July	14:55	Qualifying - LMP3
Saturday, 15 July	15:20	Qualifying - LMP2 Pro/Am
Saturday, 15 July	15:45	Qualifying - LMP2
Sunday, 16 July	11:30	Race

== Free practice ==
- Only the fastest car in each class is shown.

Free Practice 1	Class	No.	Entrant	Time
Free Practice 1	LMP2	47	(Switzerland) Cool Racing	1:43.030
Free Practice 1	LMP2 Pro/Am	37	(Switzerland) Cool Racing	1:43.936
Free Practice 1	LMP3	13	(Poland) Inter Europol Competition	1:50.542
Free Practice 1	LMGTE	44	(Denmark) GMB Motorsport	1:54.804
Free Practice 2	Class	No.	Entrant	Time
Free Practice 2	LMP2	28	(France) IDEC Sport	1:44.279
Free Practice 2	LMP2 Pro/Am	19	(Poland) Team Virage	1:45.004
Free Practice 2	LMP3	10	(Italy) Eurointernational	1:51.310
Free Practice 2	LMGTE	16	(Germany) Proton Competition	1:54.650

== Qualifying ==
Pole position winners in each class are marked in bold.

Pos	Class	No.	Team	Driver	Time	Gap	Grid
1	**LMP2**	**47**	**(Switzerland) Cool Racing**	**(Argentina) José María López**	**1:44.253**	—	1
2	LMP2	28	(France) IDEC Sport	(France) Paul-Loup Chatin	1:44.519	+0,266	2
3	LMP2	65	(France) Panis Racing	(Netherlands) Job van Uitert	1:44.600	+0,347	3
4	LMP2	43	(Poland) Inter Europol Competition	(United Kingdom) Olli Caldwell	1:44.742	+0,489	4
5	LMP2	25	(Portugal) Algarve Pro Racing	(United Kingdom) Alexander Lynn	1:44.800	+0,547	5
6	LMP2	30	(France) Duqueine Team	(Austria) René Binder	1:45.412	+1,159	6
7	**LMP2 Pro/Am**	**34**	**Racing Team Turkey**	**(Turkey) Salih Yoluç**	**1:46.178**	**+1,925**	7
8	LMP2 Pro/Am	99	(Germany) Proton Competition	(Italy) Giorgio Roda	1:47.008	+2,755	8
9	LMP2 Pro/Am	24	(United Kingdom) Nielsen Racing	(United States) Rodrigo Sales	1:47.208	+2,955	9
10	LMP2 Pro/Am	3	(Luxembourg) DKR Engineering	(Belgium) Tom Van Rompuy	1:47.334	+3,081	10
11	LMP2 Pro/Am	83	(Italy) AF Corse	(France) François Perrodo	1:47.443	+3,190	11
12	LMP2 Pro/Am	19	(Poland) Team Virage	(Germany) Alexander Mattschull	1:47.934	+3,681	12
13	LMP2 Pro/Am	37	(Switzerland) Cool Racing	(Switzerland) Alexandre Coigny	1:48.054	+3,801	13
14	LMP2 Pro/Am	81	(United States) DragonSpeed USA	(Sweden) Henrik Hedman	1:48.236	+3,983	14
15	LMP2 Pro/Am	21	(United States) United Autosports USA	(Brazil) Daniel Schneider	1:48.430	+4,177	15
16	LMP2 Pro/Am	20	(Portugal) Algarve Pro Racing	(United States) Fred Poordad	1:50.040	+5,787	16
17	**LMP3**	**12**	**(Germany) WTM by Rinaldi Racing**	**(Colombia) Óscar Tunjo**	**1:51.267**	**+7,014**	17
18	LMP3	7	(United Kingdom) Nielsen Racing	(United Kingdom) Ryan Harper-Ellam	1:51.349	+7,096	18
19	LMP2 Pro/Am	23	(United States) United Autosports USA	(United States) James McGuire	1:51.442	+7,189	19
20	LMP3	13	(Poland) Inter Europol Competition	(United Kingdom) Kai Askey	1:51.530	+7,277	20
21	LMP3	8	(Poland) Team Virage	(Portugal) Manuel Espírito Santo	1:51.595	+7,342	21
22	LMP3	17	(Switzerland) Cool Racing	(Argentina) Marcos Siebert	1:51.676	+7,423	22
23	LMP3	15	(United Kingdom) RLR MSport	(France) Gaël Julien	1:51.755	+7,502	23
24	LMP3	4	(Luxembourg) DKR Engineering	(United Kingdom) James Winslow	1:52.039	+7,786	24
25	LMP3	35	(France) Ultimate	(France) Matthieu Lahaye	1:52.075	+7,822	25
26	LMP3	11	(Italy) Eurointernational	(Canada) Adam Ali	1:52.136	+7,883	26
27	LMP3	31	(Switzerland) Racing Spirit of Léman	(France) Antoine Doquin	1:52.152	+7,899	27
28	LMP3	5	(United Kingdom) RLR MSport	(Denmark) Valdemar Eriksen	1:52.743	+8,490	28
29	**LMGTE**	**77**	**(Germany) Proton Competition**	**(Germany) Christian Ried**	**1:56.260**	**+12.007**	29
30	LMGTE	55	(Switzerland) Spirit of Race	(United Kingdom) Duncan Cameron	1:56.407	+12.154	30
31	LMGTE	93	(Germany) Proton Competition	(Republic of Ireland) Michael Fassbender	1:56.482	+12.229	31
32	LMGTE	50	(Denmark) Formula Racing	(Denmark) Johnny Laursen	1:56.574	+12.321	32
33	LMGTE	72	(United Kingdom) TF Sport	(France) Arnold Robin	1:56.582	+12.329	33
34	LMGTE	16	(Germany) Proton Competition	(United States) Ryan Hardwick	1:56.656	+12.403	34
35	LMGTE	44	(Denmark) GMB Motorsport	(Denmark) Jens Reno Møller	1:56.659	+12.406	35
36	LMGTE	57	(Switzerland) Kessel Racing	(Japan) Takeshi Kimura	1:56.974	+12.721	36
37	LMGTE	66	(United Kingdom) JMW Motorsport	(Singapore) Martin Berry	1:57.315	+13.062	37
38	LMGTE	95	(United Kingdom) TF Sport	(United Kingdom) John Hartshorne	1:57.517	+13.264	38
39	LMGTE	51	(Italy) AF Corse	(Greece) Kriton Lentoudis	1:57.706	+13.453	39
40	LMGTE	60	(Italy) Iron Lynx	(Italy) Claudio Schiavoni	1:57.790	+13.537	40
41	LMP2	22	(United States) United Autosports USA (Note: The No. 22 United Autosports USA was allowed to start in the race from the back of the grid despite not setting any lap time. For causing the red flag in the LMP2 Qualifying session the crew was obliged to start the race with their fastest driver.)	—			41
DSQ	LMP3	10	(Italy) Eurointernational (Note: The No. 10 Eurointernational was disqualified from Qualifying session for technical infraction. The car had its splitter 2mm below the minimum set by the technical regulations.)	(Netherlands) Glenn van Berlo	1:51.326	+7,073	42

== Race ==
=== Race result ===
The minimum number of laps for classification (70% of overall winning car's distance) was 88 laps. Class winners are marked in bold.

Final Classification
Pos	Class	No.	Team	Drivers	Car	Tyres	Laps	Time/Gap
1	**LMP2**	**25**	**(Portugal) Algarve Pro Racing**	**(United States) Kyffin Simpson (Australia) James Allen (United Kingdom) Alexander Lynn**	**Oreca 07**	G	**126**	**4:00:12.680**
2	LMP2	30	(France) Duqueine Team	(United Kingdom) Nicolás Pino (Austria) René Binder (Switzerland) Neel Jani	Oreca 07	G	126	+1.078
3	**LMP2 Pro/Am**	**34**	**Racing Team Turkey**	**(Turkey) Salih Yoluç (Republic of Ireland) Charlie Eastwood (Switzerland) Louis Delétraz**	**Oreca 07**	G	**126**	**+5.691**
4	LMP2	43	(Poland) Inter Europol Competition	(Angola) Rui Andrade (South Africa) Jonathan Aberdein (United Kingdom) Olli Caldwell	Oreca 07	G	126	+5.942
5	LMP2	47	(Switzerland) Cool Racing	Vladislav Lomko (France) Reshad de Gerus (Argentina) José María López	Oreca 07	G	126	+11.012
6	LMP2	28	(France) IDEC Sport	(France) Paul Lafargue (France) Paul-Loup Chatin (Germany) Laurents Hörr	Oreca 07	G	126	+34.332
7	LMP2 Pro/Am	37	(Switzerland) Cool Racing	(Switzerland) Alexandre Coigny (Denmark) Malthe Jakobsen (France) Nicolas Lapierre	Oreca 07	G	126	+38.343
8	LMP2	65	(France) Panis Racing	(United Kingdom) Manuel Maldonado (Netherlands) Job van Uitert (Netherlands) Tijmen van der Helm	Oreca 07	G	126	+38.873
9	LMP2 Pro/Am	83	(Italy) AF Corse	(France) François Perrodo (France) Matthieu Vaxivière (United Kingdom) Ben Barnicoat	Oreca 07	G	126	+1:09.632 (Note: The No. 83 AF Corse was penalised for pit stop infringement and was handed 5 seconds time penalty.)
10	LMP2 Pro/Am	24	(United Kingdom) Nielsen Racing	(United States) Rodrigo Sales (United Kingdom) Ben Hanley (Switzerland) Mathias Beche	Oreca 07	G	126	+1:28.022
11	LMP2 Pro/Am	21	(United States) United Autosports USA	(Brazil) Daniel Schneider (United Kingdom) Andrew Meyrick (Brazil) Nelson Piquet Jr.	Oreca 07	G	126	+1:28.123
12	LMP2	22	(United States) United Autosports USA	(Japan) Marino Sato (United Kingdom) Philip Hanson (United Kingdom) Oliver Jarvis	Oreca 07	G	126	+1:30.023
13	LMP2 Pro/Am	99	(Germany) Proton Competition	(Italy) Giorgio Roda (Germany) Jonas Ried (Italy) Gianmaria Bruni	Oreca 07	G	125	+1 Lap
14	LMP2 Pro/Am	81	(United States) DragonSpeed USA	(Sweden) Henrik Hedman (Colombia) Sebastián Montoya (Colombia) Juan Pablo Montoya	Oreca 07	G	125	+1 Lap
15	LMP2 Pro/Am	20	(Portugal) Algarve Pro Racing	(United States) Fred Poordad (France) Tristan Vautier (United Kingdom) Jack Hawksworth	Oreca 07	G	124	+2 Laps
16	LMP2 Pro/Am	3	(Luxembourg) DKR Engineering	(Belgium) Tom Van Rompuy (United Kingdom) Sebastián Álvarez (France) Nathanaël Berthon	Oreca 07	G	124	+2 Laps
17	LMP2 Pro/Am	23	(United States) United Autosports USA	(United States) James McGuire (United Kingdom) Guy Smith (United Kingdom) Paul di Resta	Oreca 07	G	123	+3 Laps
18	**LMP3**	**31**	**(Switzerland) Racing Spirit of Léman**	**(France) Jacques Wolff (France) Jean-Ludovic Foubert (France) Antoine Doquin**	**Ligier JS P320**	MI	**120**	**+6 Laps**
19	LMP3	12	(Germany) WTM by Rinaldi Racing	(Germany) Torsten Kratz (Germany) Leonard Weiss (Colombia) Óscar Tunjo	Duqueine M30 – D08	MI	120	+6 Laps
20	LMP3	17	(Switzerland) Cool Racing	(France) Adrien Chila (Argentina) Marcos Siebert (Mexico) Alejandro García	Ligier JS P320	MI	120	+6 Laps
21	LMP3	15	(United Kingdom) RLR MSport	(Austria) Horst Felbermayr (France) Gaël Julien (Poland) Mateusz Kaprzyk	Ligier JS P320	MI	120	+6 Laps
22	LMP3	4	(Luxembourg) DKR Engineering	(United Arab Emirates) Alexander Bukhantsov (United Kingdom) James Winslow (Portugal) Pedro Perino	Duqueine M30 – D08	MI	120	+6 Laps
23	LMP3	13	(Poland) Inter Europol Competition	(Portugal) Miguel Cristóvão (United Kingdom) Kai Askey (United States) Wyatt Brichacek	Ligier JS P320	MI	119	+7 Laps
24	LMP3	11	(Italy) Eurointernational	(United Kingdom) Matthew Richard Bell (Canada) Adam Ali	Ligier JS P320	MI	119	+7 Laps
25	LMP3	8	(Poland) Team Virage	(United Kingdom) Nick Adcock (Denmark) Michael Jensen (Portugal) Manuel Espírito Santo	Ligier JS P320	MI	119	+7 Laps
26	LMP3	5	(United Kingdom) RLR MSport	(Canada) James Dayson (Denmark) Valdemar Eriksen (United Kingdom) Jack Manchester	Ligier JS P320	MI	119	+7 Laps
27	LMP3	10	(Italy) Eurointernational	(Germany) Matthias Lüthen (Netherlands) Glenn van Berlo	Ligier JS P320	MI	118	+8 Laps
28	LMP3	7	(United Kingdom) Nielsen Racing	(United Kingdom) Anthony Wells (United Kingdom) Ryan Harper-Ellam	Ligier JS P320	MI	118	+8 Laps
29	**LMGTE**	**77**	**(Germany) Proton Competition**	**(Germany) Christian Ried (Italy) Giammarco Levorato (France) Julien Andlauer**	**Porsche 911 RSR-19**	G	**118**	**+8 Laps**
30	LMGTE	60	(Italy) Iron Lynx	(Italy) Claudio Schiavoni (Italy) Matteo Cressoni (Italy) Matteo Cairoli	Porsche 911 RSR-19	G	118	+8 Laps
31	LMGTE	95	(United Kingdom) TF Sport	(United Kingdom) John Hartshorne (United Kingdom) Ben Tuck (United Kingdom) Jonathan Adam	Aston Martin Vantage AMR	G	117	+9 Laps
32	LMGTE	57	(Switzerland) Kessel Racing	(Japan) Takeshi Kimura (United States) Gregory Huffaker II (Denmark) Frederik Schandorff	Ferrari 488 GTE Evo	G	117	+9 Laps (Note: The No. 57 Kessel Racing was penalised for causing the collision with No. 16 Proton Competition and was handed drive through penalty. The penalty was converted to 35 seconds time penalty.)
33	LMGTE	55	(Switzerland) Spirit of Race	(United Kingdom) Duncan Cameron (South Africa) David Perel (Republic of Ireland) Matt Griffin	Ferrari 488 GTE Evo	G	117	+9 Laps
34	LMGTE	66	(United Kingdom) JMW Motorsport	(Singapore) Martin Berry (United Kingdom) Lorcan Hanafin (United Kingdom) Jon Lancaster	Ferrari 488 GTE Evo	G	117	+9 Laps
35	LMGTE	72	(United Kingdom) TF Sport	(France) Arnold Robin (France) Maxime Robin (France) Valentin Hasse-Clot	Aston Martin Vantage AMR	G	117	+9 Laps
36	LMGTE	50	(Denmark) Formula Racing	(Denmark) Johnny Laursen (Denmark) Conrad Laursen (Denmark) Nicklas Nielsen	Ferrari 488 GTE Evo	G	117	+9 Laps
37	LMGTE	16	(Germany) Proton Competition	(United States) Ryan Hardwick (Canada) Zacharie Robichon (Belgium) Alessio Picariello	Porsche 911 RSR-19	G	117	+9 Laps (Note: The No. 16 Proton Competition was penalised for the collision with #28 IDEC Sport and was handed drive through penalty. The penalty was converted into 35 seconds time penalty.)
38	LMGTE	93	(Germany) Proton Competition	(Republic of Ireland) Michael Fassbender (Estonia) Martin Rump (Austria) Richard Lietz	Porsche 911 RSR-19	G	117	+9 Laps (Note: The No. 93 Proton Competition was penalised for abusing track limits and was handed drive through penalty. The penalty was converted into 35 seconds time penalty.)
39	LMGTE	51	(Italy) AF Corse	(Greece) Kriton Lendoudis (Portugal) Rui Águas (Belgium) Ulysse de Pauw	Ferrari 488 GTE Evo	G	116	+10 Laps
40	LMGTE	44	(Denmark) GMB Motorsport	(Denmark) Jens Reno Møller (Denmark) Gustav Birch (Denmark) Nicki Thiim	Aston Martin Vantage AMR	G	115	+11 Laps
41	LMP3	35	(France) Ultimate	(France) Eric Trouillet (France) Matthieu Lahaye (France) Jean-Baptiste Lahaye	Ligier JS P320	MI	109	+17 Laps
Not classified
	LMP2 Pro/Am	19	(Poland) Team Virage	(Germany) Alexander Mattschull (Guatemala) Ian Rodríguez (Colombia) Tatiana Calderón	Oreca 07	G	125	

=== Statistics ===
==== Fastest lap ====
Class	Driver	Team	Time	Lap
LMP2	(United States) Kyffin Simpson	(Portugal) #25 Algarve Pro Racing	1:45.002	6
LMP2 Pro/Am	(Switzerland) Louis Delétraz	#34 Racing Team Turkey	1:45.430	99
LMP3	(Argentina) Marcos Siebert	(Switzerland) #17 Cool Racing	1:52.682	91
LMGTE	(France) Julien Andlauer	(Germany) #77 Proton Competition	1:55.230	88
