= 2023 4 Hours of Algarve =

Endurance sportscar racing event

The layout of the Algarve International Circuit

The 2023 4 Hours of Algarve was an endurance sportscar racing event held between 19 and 20 October 2023, as the fifth round of the 2023 European Le Mans Series season.

== Background ==
The race meeting at Algarve International Circuit was turned into double race weekend after the cancellation of planned race at Imola.

== Entry list ==
The entry list was published on 11 October and consisted of 41 entries in 4 categories – 7 in LMP2, 10 in LMP2 Pro/Am, 12 in LMP3 and 12 in LMGTE.

The No. 10 Eurointernational withdrew from competing before the racing weekend.

Ben Barnicoat came back to racing for the No. 83 AF Corse after missing two previous races. Jack Hawksworth returned to the No. 20 Algarve Pro Racing after also missing previous two races. Bent Viscaal replaced Gianmaria Bruni in the No. 99 Proton Competition.

== Schedule ==
Date	Time (local: WEST)	Event
Thursday, 19 October	9:50	Free Practice 1
Thursday, 19 October	16:20	Bronze Drivers Collective Test
Friday, 20 October	9:50	Qualifying - LMGTE
Friday, 20 October	10:15	Qualifying - LMP3
Friday, 20 October	10:40	Qualifying - LMP2 Pro/Am
Friday, 20 October	11:05	Qualifying - LMP2
Friday, 20 October	14:45	Race

== Free practice ==
- Only the fastest car in each class is shown.

Class	No.	Entrant	Time
LMP2	25	(Portugal) Algarve Pro Racing	1:33.898
LMP2 Pro/Am	21	(United States) United Autosports USA	1:34.023
LMP3	13	(Poland) Inter Europol Competition	1:38.649
LMGTE	95	(United Kingdom) TF Sport	1:42.409

== Qualifying ==
Pole position winners in each class are marked in bold.

Pos	Class	No.	Team	Driver	Time	Gap	Grid
1	**LMP2**	**25**	**(Portugal) Algarve Pro Racing**	**(Australia) James Allen**	**1:48.674**	—	1
2	LMP2	43	(Poland) Inter Europol Competition	(United Kingdom) Olli Caldwell	1:49.555	+0.881	2
3	LMP2	28	(France) IDEC Sport	(Germany) Laurents Hörr	1:49.896	+1.222	3
4	LMP2	65	(France) Panis Racing	(Netherlands) Job van Uitert	1:50.159	+1.485	4
5	LMP2	30	(France) Duqueine Team	(Switzerland) Neel Jani	1:50.311	+1.637	5
6	LMP2	22	(United States) United Autosports USA	(United Kingdom) Philip Hanson	1:50.634	+1.960	6
7	LMP2	47	(Switzerland) Cool Racing	(France) Reshad de Gerus	1:51.793	+3.119	7
8	**LMP2 Pro/Am**	**19**	**(Poland) Team Virage**	**(Germany) Alexander Mattschull**	**1:55.426**	**+6.752**	8
9	**LMP3**	**8**	**(Poland) Team Virage**	**(Portugal) Manuel Espírito Santo**	**1:56.029**	**+7.355**	18
10	LMP3	12	(Germany) WTM by Rinaldi Racing	(Colombia) Óscar Tunjo	1:56.255	+7.581	19
11	LMP2 Pro/Am	34	Racing Team Turkey	(Turkey) Salih Yoluç	1:56.472	+7.798	9
12	LMP2 Pro/Am	24	(United Kingdom) Nielsen Racing	(United States) Rodrigo Sales	1:56.792	+8.118	10
13	LMP2 Pro/Am	99	(Germany) Proton Competition	(Italy) Giorgio Roda	1:57.371	+8.697	11
14	LMP2 Pro/Am	3	(Luxembourg) DKR Engineering	(Belgium) Tom van Rompuy	1:57.585	+8.911	12
15	LMP3	17	(Switzerland) Cool Racing	(Argentina) Marcos Siebert	1:57.727	+9.053	20
16	LMP3	11	(Italy) Eurointernational	(Canada) Adam Ali	1:57.932	+9.258	21
17	LMP3	4	(Luxembourg) DKR Engineering	(Portugal) Pedro Perino	1:57.950	+9.276	22
18	LMP3	7	(United Kingdom) Nielsen Racing	(United Kingdom) Ryan Harper-Ellam	1:58.067	+9.393	23
19	LMP3	13	(Poland) Inter Europol Competition	(United States) Wyatt Brichacek	1:58.182	+9.508	24
20	LMP3	31	(Switzerland) Racing Spirit of Léman	(France) Antoine Doquin	1:58.312	+9.638	25
21	LMP3	15	(United Kingdom) RLR M Sport	(France) Gaël Julien	1:58.489	+9.815	26
22	LMP3	35	(France) Ultimate	(France) Matthieu Lahaye	1:58.578	+9.904	27
23	LMP3	5	(United Kingdom) RLR M Sport	(Denmark) Valdemar Eriksen	1:58.702	+10.028	28
24	LMP2 Pro/Am	83	(Italy) AF Corse	(France) François Perrodo	1:59.912	+11.238	13
25	LMP2 Pro/Am	20	(Portugal) Algarve Pro Racing	(United States) Fred Poordad	2:01.126	+12.452	14
26	LMP2 Pro/Am	81	(United States) DragonSpeed USA	(Sweden) Henrik Hedman	2:01.698	+13.024	15
27	**LMGTE**	**72**	**(United Kingdom) TF Sport**	**(France) Arnold Robin**	**2:01.872**	**+13.198**	29
28	LMP2 Pro/Am	37	(Switzerland) Cool Racing	(Switzerland) Alexandre Coigny	2:02.705	+14.031	16
29	LMGTE	50	(Denmark) Formula Racing	(Denmark) Johnny Laursen	2:02.830	+14.156	30
30	LMGTE	44	(Denmark) GMB Motorsport	(Denmark) Jens Møller	2:03.142	+14.468	31
31	LMGTE	77	(Germany) Proton Competition	(Germany) Christian Ried	2:04.008	+15.334	32
32	LMGTE	55	(Switzerland) Spirit of Race	(United Kingdom) Duncan Cameron	2:04.618	+15.944	33
33	LMGTE	16	(Germany) Proton Competition	(United States) Ryan Hardwick	2:05.864	+17.190	34
34	LMP2 Pro/Am	21	(United States) United Autosports USA	(Brazil) Daniel Schneider	2:07.825	+19.151	17
35	LMGTE	51	(Italy) AF Corse	(Greece) Kriton Lendoudis	2:08.059	+19.385	35
36	LMGTE	57	(Switzerland) Kessel Racing	(Japan) Takeshi Kimura	2:08.779	+20.105	36
37	LMGTE	66	(United Kingdom) JMW Motorsport	(Singapore) Martin Berry	2:09.468	+20.794	37
38	LMGTE	95	(United Kingdom) TF Sport	(United Kingdom) John Hartshorne	2:10.582	+21.908	38
39	LMGTE	60	(Italy) Iron Lynx	(Italy) Claudio Schiavoni	2:11.288	+22.614	39
40	LMGTE	93	(Germany) Proton Competition (Note: The No. 99 Proton Competition was penalised for causing a red flag and lost all its lap times. The fastest driver of the crew, Martin Rump, had to start the race.)	—			40

== Race ==
=== Race result ===
The minimum number of laps for classification (70% of overall winning car's distance) was 84 laps. Class winners are marked in bold.

Final Classification
Pos	Class	No	Team	Drivers	Car	Tyres	Laps	Time/Gap
1	**LMP2**	**22**	**(United States) United Autosports USA**	**(Japan) Marino Sato (United Kingdom) Philip Hanson (United Kingdom) Oliver Jarvis**	**Oreca 07**	G	**120**	**4:00:43.255**
2	LMP2	25	(Portugal) Algarve Pro Racing	(Barbados) Kyffin Simpson (Australia) James Allen (United Kingdom) Alexander Lynn	Oreca 07	G	120	+0.808
3	LMP2	65	(France) Panis Racing	(Netherlands) Job van Uitert (United Kingdom) Manuel Maldonado (Netherlands) Tijmen van der Helm	Oreca 07	G	120	+21.247
4	LMP2	47	(Switzerland) Cool Racing	Vladislav Lomko (France) Reshad de Gerus (Argentina) José María López	Oreca 07	G	120	+43.090
5	LMP2	30	(France) Duqueine Team	(United Kingdom) Nicolás Pino (Austria) René Binder (Switzerland) Neel Jani	Oreca 07	G	120	+43.973
6	**LMP2 Pro/Am**	**37**	**(Switzerland) Cool Racing**	**(Switzerland) Alexandre Coigny (Denmark) Malthe Jakobsen (France) Nicolas Lapierre**	**Oreca 07**	G	**119**	**+1 Lap**
7	LMP2 Pro/Am	24	(United Kingdom) Nielsen Racing	(United States) Rodrigo Sales (United Kingdom) Ben Hanley (Switzerland) Mathias Beche	Oreca 07	G	119	+1 Lap (Note: The No. 24 Nielsen Racing was penalised for causing a contact with car No. 83. The penalty was 10 seconds added to crew's total race time.)
8	LMP2 Pro/Am	83	(Italy) AF Corse	(France) François Perrodo (France) Matthieu Vaxivière (United Kingdom) Ben Barnicoat	Oreca 07	G	119	+1 Lap
9	LMP2	28	(France) IDEC Sport	(France) Paul Lafargue (France) Paul-Loup Chatin (Germany) Laurents Hörr	Oreca 07	G	119	+1 Lap
10	LMP2 Pro/Am	21	(United States) United Autosports USA	(Brazil) Daniel Schneider (United Kingdom) Andrew Meyrick (Brazil) Nelson Piquet Jr.	Oreca 07	G	119	+1 Lap (Note: The No. 21 United Autosports USA was penalised for overtaking during Safety Car period. The penalty was 10 seconds added to crew's total race time.)
11	LMP2 Pro/Am	81	(United States) DragonSpeed USA	(Sweden) Henrik Hedman (Colombia) Sebastián Montoya (Colombia) Juan Pablo Montoya	Oreca 07	G	118	+2 Laps
12	LMP2 Pro/Am	34	Racing Team Turkey	(Turkey) Salih Yoluç (Republic of Ireland) Charlie Eastwood (Switzerland) Louis Delétraz	Oreca 07	G	118	+2 Laps
13	LMP2 Pro/Am	20	(Portugal) Algarve Pro Racing	(United States) Fred Poordad (France) Tristan Vautier (United Kingdom) Jack Hawksworth	Oreca 07	G	118	+2 Laps
14	LMP2 Pro/Am	3	(Luxembourg) DKR Engineering	(Belgium) Tom van Rompuy (United Kingdom) Sebastián Álvarez (France) Nathanaël Berthon	Oreca 07	G	118	+2 Laps
15	LMP2 Pro/Am	19	(Poland) Team Virage	(Germany) Alexander Mattschull (Guatemala) Ian Rodríguez (Colombia) Tatiana Calderón	Oreca 07	G	117	+3 Laps
16	**LMP3**	**12**	**(Germany) WTM by Rinaldi Racing**	**(Germany) Torsten Kratz (Germany) Leonard Weiss (Colombia) Óscar Tunjo**	**Duqueine M30 – D08**	MI	**116**	**+4 Laps**
17	LMP3	35	(France) Ultimate	(France) Eric Trouillet (France) Matthieu Lahaye (France) Jean-Baptiste Lahaye	Ligier JS P320	MI	116	+4 Laps
18	LMP3	4	(Luxembourg) DKR Engineering	(United Arab Emirates) Alexander Bukhantsov (United Kingdom) James Winslow (Portugal) Pedro Perino	Duqueine M30 – D08	MI	116	+4 Laps
19	LMP3	17	(Switzerland) Cool Racing	(France) Adrien Chila (Argentina) Marcos Siebert (Mexico) Alejandro Garcia	Ligier JS P320	MI	116	+4 Laps
20	LMP3	5	(United Kingdom) RLR M Sport	(Canada) James Dayson (Denmark) Valdemar Eriksen (United Kingdom) Jack Manchester	Ligier JS P320	MI	115	+5 Laps
21	LMP3	15	(United Kingdom) RLR M Sport	(Austria) Horst Felbermayr Jr (France) Gaël Julien (Poland) Mateusz Kaprzyk	Ligier JS P320	MI	115	+5 Laps (Note: The No. 15 RLR M Sport was penalised for a pit stop infringement. The penalty was 5 seconds added to crew's total race time.)
22	**LMGTE**	**77**	**(Germany) Proton Competition**	**(Germany) Christian Ried (Italy) Giammarco Levorato (France) Julien Andlauer**	**Porsche 911 RSR-19**	G	**115**	**+5 Laps**
23	LMGTE	16	(Germany) Proton Competition	(United States) Ryan Hardwick (Canada) Zacharie Robichon (Belgium) Alessio Picariello	Porsche 911 RSR-19	G	115	+5 Laps
24	LMGTE	60	(Italy) Iron Lynx	(Italy) Claudio Schiavoni (Italy) Matteo Cressoni (Italy) Matteo Cairoli	Porsche 911 RSR-19	G	115	+5 Laps
25	LMGTE	57	(Switzerland) Kessel Racing	(Japan) Takeshi Kimura (United States) Scott Huffaker (Brazil) Daniel Serra	Ferrari 488 GTE Evo	G	115	+5 Laps
26	LMGTE	72	(United Kingdom) TF Sport	(France) Arnold Robin (France) Maxime Robin (France) Valentin Hasse-Clot	Aston Martin Vantage AMR	G	115	+5 Laps
27	LMGTE	51	(Italy) AF Corse	(Greece) Kriton Lendoudis (Portugal) Rui Águas (Belgium) Ulysse de Pauw	Ferrari 488 GTE Evo	G	115	+5 Laps
28	LMGTE	55	(Switzerland) Spirit of Race	(United Kingdom) Duncan Cameron (South Africa) David Perel (Republic of Ireland) Matt Griffin	Ferrari 488 GTE Evo	G	115	+5 Laps
29	LMP3	7	(United Kingdom) Nielsen Racing	(United Kingdom) Anthony Wells (United Kingdom) Ryan Harper-Ellam	Ligier JS P320	MI	115	+5 Laps (Note: The No. 7 Nielsen Racing was penalised for exiting the pit lane with the red light on. The penalty was 10 seconds added to crew's total race time.)
30	LMP3	31	(Switzerland) Racing Spirit of Léman	(France) Jacques Wolff (France) Jean-Ludovic Foubert (France) Antoine Doquin	Ligier JS P320	MI	114	+6 Laps
31	LMGTE	44	(Denmark) GMB Motorsport	(Denmark) Jens Møller (Denmark) Gustav Birch (Denmark) Nicki Thiim	Aston Martin Vantage AMR	G	114	+6 Laps
32	LMGTE	93	(Germany) Proton Competition	(Republic of Ireland) Michael Fassbender (Estonia) Martin Rump (Austria) Richard Lietz	Porsche 911 RSR-19	G	114	+6 Laps
33	LMGTE	95	(United Kingdom) TF Sport	(United Kingdom) John Hartshorne (United Kingdom) Ben Tuck (United Kingdom) Jonathan Adam	Aston Martin Vantage AMR	G	114	+6 Laps
34	LMGTE	66	(United Kingdom) JMW Motorsport	(Singapore) Martin Berry (United Kingdom) Lorcan Hanafin (United Kingdom) Jon Lancaster	Ferrari 488 GTE Evo	G	114	+6 Laps (Note: The No. 66 JMW Motorsport was penalised for abusing track limits. The penalty was a drive through converted to 30 seconds added to crew's total race time.)
35	LMGTE	50	(Denmark) Formula Racing	(Denmark) Johnny Laursen (Denmark) Conrad Laursen (Denmark) Nicklas Nielsen	Ferrari 488 GTE Evo	G	113	+7 Laps
36	LMP3	11	(Italy) Eurointernational	(United Kingdom) Matthew Richard Bell (Canada) Adam Ali	Ligier JS P320	MI	112	+8 Laps
37	LMP2	43	(Poland) Inter Europol Competition	(Angola) Rui Andrade (United Kingdom) Olli Caldwell (South Africa) Jonathan Aberdein	Oreca 07	G	111	+9 Laps (Note: The No. 43 Inter Europol Competition was penalised for not meeting the minimum driving time of Jonathan Aberdein. Aberdein missed 13 minutes and 13.034 seconds to meet stipulated time. The penalty was subtracting 8 laps and adding 36.514 seconds to crew's total race time.)
Not classified
	LMP3	13	(Poland) Inter Europol Competition	(Portugal) Miguel Cristóvão (United Kingdom) Kai Askey (United States) Wyatt Brichacek	Ligier JS P320	MI	84	
	LMP3	8	(Poland) Team Virage	(South Africa) Michael Jensen (United Kingdom) Nick Adcock (Portugal) Manuel Espírito Santo	Ligier JS P320	MI	66	
	LMP2 Pro/Am	99	(Germany) Proton Competition	(Italy) Giorgio Roda (Germany) Jonas Ried (Netherlands) Bent Viscaal	Oreca 07	G	58	

=== Statistics ===
==== Fastest lap ====
Class	Driver	Team	Time	Lap
LMP2	(Barbados) Kyffin Simpson	(Portugal) #25 Algarve Pro Racing	1:34.565	5
LMP2 Pro/Am	(Colombia) Sebastián Montoya	(United States) #81 DragonSpeed USA	1:35.158	117
LMP3	(Argentina) Marcos Siebert	(Switzerland) #17 Cool Racing	1:39.929	114
LMGTE	(Brazil) Daniel Serra	(Switzerland) #57 Kessel Racing	1:42.442	114
