= 2009 Commodore Cup National Series =

The 2009 Commodore Cup National Series was the 16th running of the Commodore Cup. It began on 26 April 2009, at Wakefield Park and ended on 29 November 2009, at Sandown Raceway. The series was won by Brett Holdsworth, who won three of the six rounds. The other rounds were won by Nick Parker and Jason Domaschenz, who shared the victory at Winton with his brother Craig.

== Teams and drivers ==
The following drivers and teams competed in the 2009 Commodore Cup National Series.

Team	Car model	No	Driver	Winton co-driver
Top Shelf Fruits	VS Commodore	1	(Australia) Michael Tancredi	(Australia) Dean Crosswell
Top Shelf Fruits	VS Commodore	40	(Australia) Anthony Tancredi	(Australia) Adam Beechey
Top Shelf Fruits	VS Commodore	81	(Australia) Dean Crosswell	
www.bertiest.com	VS Commodore	6	(Australia) Phillip Brock	(Australia) Josh Hughes
Renaissance Homes	VH Commodore	7	(Australia) Matt Chick	(Australia) Neil Crowe
Aerial Motors Racing	VH Commodore	8	(Australia) David Stevenson	(Australia) Glenn Holdsworth
Aerial Motors Racing	VS Commodore	88	(Australia) Chris Stevenson	(Australia) Kane Millier
www.bertiest.com	VS Commodore	10	(Australia) Geoff Cowie	(Australia) Brian Agostini
Menzel Glass	VS Commodore	11	(Australia) Phillip Menzel	(Australia) Tim Shaw
Forstaff Aviation/Octane Alley	VS Commodore	12	(Australia) Josh Hughes	
Aussie NASCAR Tourers	VH Commodore	14	(Australia) David Ling	(Australia) Michael Fitzgerald
Aussie NASCAR Tourers	VH Commodore	32	(Australia) Steven Ling	(Australia) Richard Whyte
Alpha/MS Australia	VS Commodore	16	(Australia) Andrew Parker	(Australia) Andrew Fisher
Daniel Russo	VS Commodore	20	(Australia) Daniel Russo	
LBC Motorsport	VS Commodore	23	(Australia) Brian Bancroft	
WA Freight Group	VS Commodore	24	(Australia) Tony Bates	(Australia) Steve Owen
RPM Racing	VS Commodore	25	(Australia) Allan Hill	(Australia) Adis Bebonis
TTM Traffic/Hairy Lemon	VS Commodore	27	(Australia) Brett Holdsworth	(Australia) Ryan McLeod
Paint Max	VS Commodore	33	(Australia) Dennis Pana	(Australia) Chris Delmsfa
Aust Motive Power Systems	VS Commodore	34	(Australia) Stephen Yates	
Kilpa Motors/Conway Electrics	VS Commodore	39	(Australia) Nick Parker	(Australia) Shane Price
Tancredi Concreting	VH Commodore	41	(Australia) Anthony Tancredi	
Gordon TAFE/Light Alloy Engines	VS Commodore	44	(Australia) Scott Andrews	
Western EFI & Auto Electrical	VS Commodore	68	(Australia) Kieren Pilkington	(Australia) Garry Pilkington
Action Racing	VS Commodore	71	(Australia) Marcus Zukanovic	
Adams Auto Electrics	VS Commodore	77	(Australia) Adam Lloyd	(Australia) Darren Saillard
Alan Wilson Insurance Brokers	VS Commodore	78	(Australia) Dean Orr	(Australia) Daniel Orr
Impact Window Tint	VS Commodore	84	(Australia) Nathan Collins	(Australia) Terry Wyhoon
Bob Jane Geelong	VS Commodore	85	(Australia) Jason Domaschenz (Australia) Craig Domaschenz	(Australia) Craig Domaschenz
Automobility	VS Commodore	96	(Australia) Jeff Watters	(Australia) Simon Evans
Westcoast Windows P/L	VS Commodore	99	(Australia) Ross McGregor	(Australia) Geoff Emery

== Calendar ==
The 2009 Commodore Cup National Series consisted of six rounds.

Rd.	Race title	Circuit	City / State	Date	Winner
1	(New South Wales) Wakefield Park	Wakefield Park	Goulburn, New South Wales	24–26 April	Nick Parker
2	(Victoria (state)) Phillip Island	Phillip Island Grand Prix Circuit	Phillip Island, Victoria	16–17 May	Brett Holdsworth
3	(Victoria (state)) Winton	Winton Motor Raceway	Benalla, Victoria	26–28 June	Jason Domaschenz; Craig Domaschenz
4	(New South Wales) Eastern Creek	Eastern Creek Raceway	Sydney, New South Wales	17–19 July	Brett Holdsworth
5	(New South Wales) Oran Park	Oran Park Raceway	Sydney, New South Wales	28–30 August	Brett Holdsworth
6	(Victoria (state)) Sandown	Sandown International Raceway	Melbourne, Victoria	28–29 November	Jason Domaschenz

== Series standings ==
Pos.	Driver	Rd 1	Rd 2	Rd 3	Rd 4	Rd 5	Rd 6	Pts
1	Brett Holdsworth	120	132	115	146	143	113	769
2	Tony Bates	124	106	131	136	137	124	758
3	Nick Parker	136	126	84	123	125	121	715
4	Ross McGregor	98	98	125	109	85	103	618
5	Josh Hughes	112	102	58	111	119	64	566
6	Phillip Menzel	88	91	101	74	98	12	464
7	Adam Lloyd	113	94	57	96	102		462
8	Jason Domaschenz	119		143	50		146	458
9	Jeff Watters	100	43	51	91	82	82	449
10	Chris Stevenson	89	92	52		106	88	427
11	Matt Chick	85	88	95	15	96	36	415
12	Michael Tancredi	97	117	115	67			396
13	Scott Andrews		105		111	67	93	376
14	Dennis Pana	93		90	82	79		344
15	Phillip Brock	65	98	58			96	317
16	Nathan Collins		95	111	75			281
17	Craig Domaschenz		112	143				255
18	Allan Hill			70	92		91	253
19	Dean Crosswell			115			102	217
19	Andrew Parker		52	72			93	217
21	Anthony Tancredi			73	56		76	205
22	Kieren Pilkington			77		104		181
23	Garry Pilkington			77	76			153
24	David Stevenson			73			73	146
25	Steve Owen			131				131
26	Geoff Emery			125				125
27	Ryan McLeod			115				115
28	Terry Wyhoon			111				111
29	Tim Shaw			101				101
30	Marcus Zukanovic						97	97
31	Neil Crowe			95				95
32	Daniel Orr			47			46	93
33	Steven Ling			92				92
33	Richard Whyte			92				92
35	Chris Delfsma			90				90
36	Daniel Russo		84					84
36	Shane Price			84				84
36	Stephen Yates						84	84
39	Brian Bancroft	81						81
39	David Ling			81				81
39	Michael Fitzgerald			81				81
42	Adam Beechey			73				73
42	Glenn Holdsworth			73				73
44	Andrew Fisher			72				72
45	Adis Bebonis			70				70
46	Geoff Cowie			63				63
46	Brian Agostini			63				63
48	Daniel Saillard			57				57
49	Kane Millier			52				52
50	Simon Evans			51				51
51	Dean Orr			47				47
Pos	Driver	Rd 1	Rd 2	Rd 3	Rd 4	Rd 5	Rd 6	Pts

Colour	Result
Gold	Winner
Silver	Second place
Bronze	Third place
Green	Points classification
Blue	Non-points classification
Blue	Non-classified finish (NC)
Purple	Retired, not classified (Ret)
Red	Did not qualify (DNQ)
Red	Did not pre-qualify (DNPQ)
Black	Disqualified (DSQ)
White	Did not start (DNS)
White	Withdrew (WD)
White	Race cancelled (C)
Blank	Did not practice (DNP)
Blank	Did not arrive (DNA)
Blank	Excluded (EX)
