= 2011 Commodore Cup National Series =

Australian motor racing series

The 2011 Commodore Cup National Series is an Australian motor racing series. It is the 18th running of the Commodore Cup and runs on the Shannons Nationals Motor Racing Championships calendar. The series began on 3 April 2011, at Wakefield Park and will end on 6 November 2011, at Phillip Island. For the first time, two two-driver endurance rounds will be held during the season; the traditional Ashley Cooper Memorial round at Winton and a new endurance round at the Bathurst Motor Festival.

Tony Bates won the opening round of the season despite nearly failing to make it to the race one starting grid. Ross McGregor and Fujitsu V8 Supercar driver Drew Russell won the first of the two-driver rounds at Bathurst after the pole-sitting car of five-time champion Geoff Emery and V8 Supercar driver Steve Owen encountered mechanical dramas in the first race. Reigning Ashley Cooper Memorial winners Adam Beechey and Dean Crosswell successfully defended their title at Winton, with reigning Commodore Cup champion Beechey taking the championship lead. Beechey won again at Eastern Creek before finishing off the podium for the first time in Commodore Cup at Sandown, where Matt Hayes took the round win and closed Beechey's series lead to just one point with one round remaining. Hayes took pole position at the final round to be level with Beechey on points but he was forced wide at turn two in race one which allowed Beechey ahead. Beechey went on to win the round, securing his second Commodore Cup title in as many years.

== Teams and drivers ==
The following drivers and teams competed in the 2011 Commodore Cup National Series.

Team	Car model	No	Driver	Enduro co-drivers
Donut King	VS Commodore	1	(Tasmania) Adam Beechey	(Tasmania) Dean Crosswell
San Marco Italian Restaurant	VS Commodore	6	(Victoria (state)) Matthew Hayes	(Queensland) Christian D'Agostin
Renaissance Homes	VS Commodore	7	(Victoria (state)) Matthew Chick	(Australia) Scott Andrews
On Track Motorsport	VS Commodore	8		(New South Wales) Garry Mennell (New South Wales) Steve Briffa
Castle Concreting	VH Commodore	10		(Northern Territory) Geoff Cowie (Northern Territory) Bruce Panting
Octane Alley Race Engines	VS Commodore	12	(Victoria (state)) Josh Hughes	(Victoria (state)) Tim Blanchard
Aussie NASCAR Tours	VH Commodore	14		(Northern Territory) David Ling (Northern Territory) Steven Ling
Sentinel Fire Services	VS Commodore	16	(Victoria (state)) Andrew Parker	
Aquacity Pool and Spa	VH Commodore	21	(Victoria (state)) Graeme Meer	(Victoria (state)) Neil Crowe
Sports Alive	VS Commodore	24	(Victoria (state)) Tony Bates	(Queensland) David Russell
Australian Motive Power Systems	VS Commodore	34	(Victoria (state)) Stephen Yates	
Top Shelf Fruits	VS Commodore	40	(Victoria (state)) Michael Tancredi	
Anthony Tancredi	VS Commodore	41	(Victoria (state)) Anthony Tancredi	(Victoria (state)) Duane Preece
National Directory Distribution	VS Commodore	48	(Victoria (state)) Geoff Emery	(Victoria (state)) Steve Owen
Beeps Auto Parts	VS Commodore	58	(Victoria (state)) Jordan Symes	(Victoria (state)) Steve Courtis
Western General Bodyworks	VS Commodore	66	(Victoria (state)) Danny Buzadzic	(Victoria (state)) Nick Parker (Victoria (state)) Shane Price
Action Racing	VS Commodore	71	(Victoria (state)) Marcus Zukanovic	(Victoria (state)) Gerrard McLeod
Adams Auto Electrics	VS Commodore	77	(New South Wales) Adam Lloyd	(Queensland) Ryan McLeod
Aerial Motors Racing	VH Commodore	80		(Victoria (state)) David Stevenson (Queensland) Glen Holdsworth
Aerial Motors Racing	VS Commodore	88	(Victoria (state)) Chris Stevenson	(Victoria (state)) Neil Crowe (Victoria (state)) Kane Millier* (Victoria (state)) Brett Holdsworth
Jason Domaschenz	VS Commodore	85		(Victoria (state)) Jason Domaschenz (Victoria (state)) Craig Domaschenz
Automobility	VS Commodore	96	(Victoria (state)) Jeff Watters	(Victoria (state)) Simon Evans
Powercorp	VH Commodore	98		(Northern Territory) Alan Langworthy (Northern Territory) Chris Langworthy
Southern Star Windows	VS Commodore	99	(Victoria (state)) Ross McGregor	(New South Wales) Drew Russell

* practiced only

== Calendar ==
The 2011 Commodore Cup National Series will consist of six rounds. Two-driver endurance rounds will be held at Bathurst and Winton.

Rd.	Race title	Circuit	City / State	Date	Winner
1	(New South Wales) Wakefield Park	Wakefield Park	Goulburn, New South Wales	2–3 April	Tony Bates
2	(New South Wales) Bathurst	Mount Panorama	Bathurst, New South Wales	22–24 April	Ross McGregor; Drew Russell
3	(Victoria (state)) Ashley Cooper Memorial	Winton Motor Raceway	Benalla, Victoria	25–26 June	Adam Beechey; Dean Crosswell
4	(New South Wales) Eastern Creek	Eastern Creek Raceway	Sydney, New South Wales	16–17 July	Adam Beechey
5	(Victoria (state)) Sandown	Sandown International Raceway	Melbourne, Victoria	10–11 September	Matthew Hayes
6	(Victoria (state)) Phillip Island	Phillip Island Grand Prix Circuit	Phillip Island, Victoria	5–6 November	Adam Beechey

== Series standings ==
Pos	Driver	Rd 1	Rd 2	Rd 3	Rd 4	Rd 5	Rd 6	Pts
1	Adam Beechey	115	119	143	143	109	140	769
2	Matthew Hayes	101	119	124	143	141	**134**	762
3	Marcus Zukanovic	131	121	111	**114**	108	111	696
4	Ross McGregor	105	137	122	105	91	102	662
5	Chris Stevenson	99	101	90	103	**122**	108	623
6	Matthew Chick	99	78	104	110	100	113	604
7	Danny Buzadzic	84	105	83	85	112	104	573
8	Tony Bates	135	86	99	116	106		542
9	Geoff Emery	103	**108**	**93**	92	87		483
10	Graeme Meer	81		98	40	91	47	357
11	Jeff Watters		66	83		94	99	342
12	Jordan Symes			34	38	101	101	274
13	Dean Crosswell		119	143				262
14	Drew Russell		137	122				259
15	Christian D'Agostin		119	124				243
16	Gerrard McLeod		121	111				232
17	Steve Owen		**108**	**93**				201
18	Adam Lloyd	114	85	DNS				199
18	Neil Crowe		101	98				199
20	David Russell		86	99				185
21	Scott Andrews		78	104				182
22	Michael Tancredi					91	79	170
23	Simon Evans		66	83				149
24	Anthony Tancredi			98			50	148
25	Nick Parker		105					105
26	David Ling		98					98
26	Steven Ling		98					98
26	Duane Preece			98				98
29	Garry Mennell		94					94
29	Steve Briffa		94					94
31	Glen Holdsworth			92				92
31	David Stevenson			92				92
33	Brett Holdsworth			90				90
34	Geoff Cowie		89					89
34	Bruce Panting		89					89
36	Ryan McLeod		85	DNS				85
36	Josh Hughes	85	EX					85
38	Shane Price			83				83
39	Alan Langworthy		76					76
39	Chris Langworthy		76					76
41	Stephen Yates					65		65
42	Steve Courtis			34				34
43	Jason Domaschenz		29					29
43	Craig Domaschenz		29					29
45	Andrew Parker						17	17
—	Tim Blanchard		EX					0

Colour	Result
Gold	Winner
Silver	Second place
Bronze	Third place
Green	Points classification
Blue	Non-points classification
Blue	Non-classified finish (NC)
Purple	Retired, not classified (Ret)
Red	Did not qualify (DNQ)
Red	Did not pre-qualify (DNPQ)
Black	Disqualified (DSQ)
White	Did not start (DNS)
White	Withdrew (WD)
White	Race cancelled (C)
Blank	Did not practice (DNP)
Blank	Did not arrive (DNA)
Blank	Excluded (EX)

Bold indicates 1 bonus point for pole.
