= 2010 Commodore Cup National Series =

The 2010 Commodore Cup National Series was the 17th running of the Commodore Cup. It began on 7 March 2010, at Wakefield Park and ended on 24 October 2010, at Sandown Raceway. The series was won by Adam Beechey, winning two rounds during the season, sharing one with Dean Crosswell in the Winton round. No other driver won more than one round, as the other four rounds were split between championship runner-up Tony Bates, third-placed Nick Parker, Brett Holdsworth and Marcus Zukanovic.

== Teams and drivers ==
The following drivers and teams competed in the 2010 Commodore Cup National Series.

Team	Car model	No	Driver	Winton Co-driver
TTM Group	VS Commodore	1	(Australia) Brett Holdsworth	(Australia) Lee Holdsworth
www.bertiest.com	VS Commodore	6	(Australia) Phil Brock	(Australia) Neil Crowe
San Marco Restaurant	VS Commodore	6	(Australia) Matthew Hayes	
Renaissance Homes	VS Commodore	7	(Australia) Matt Chick	(Australia) Shane Price
Aerial Motors Racing	VH Commodore	8		(Australia) David Stevenson (Australia) Glen Holdsworth
Aerial Motors Racing	VS Commodore	88	(Australia) Chris Stevenson	(Australia) Kane Millier
Axent Racing	VS Commodore	9	(Australia) Geoff Fontaine	
Axent Racing	VS Commodore	90	(Australia) Garth Duffy	
Greenbird Technologies	VS Commodore; VH Commodore	10	(Australia) Geoff Cowie	(Australia) Alan Langworthy
Octane Alley Race Engines	VS Commodore	12	(Australia) Josh Hughes	(Australia) Paul Morris* (Australia) Tim Blanchard**
Aussie NASCAR Tours	VH Commodore	14	(Australia) David Ling	(Australia) Michael Fitzgerald
Aussie NASCAR Tours	VH Commodore	32	(Australia) Steven Ling	(Australia) Richard Whyte
LBC Motorsport	VS Commodore	23	(Australia) Brian Bancroft	
Alternative Freight Services	VS Commodore	24	(Australia) Tony Bates	(Australia) Geoff Emery
Worksense Workwear	VS Commodore	25	(Australia) Allan Hill	
Nichiyu Forklifts	VH Commodore	34	(Australia) Mathew Hayes	(Australia) Ryan Millier
Steve Yates	VS Commodore	34	(Australia) Glenn Mackenzie	
Kilpa Motors	VS Commodore	39	(Australia) Nick Parker	(Australia) Darren Hossack
Tancredi Concreting	VH Commodore	41	(Australia) Anthony Tancredi	(Australia) Mark Grima
Luna Fringe	VS Commodore	44	(Australia) Scott Andrews	(Australia) Tim Shaw
National Directory Distribution	VS Commodore	48	(Australia) Geoff Emery	
Western General Bodyworks	VS Commodore	66	(Australia) Danny Buzadzic	(Australia) Sam Walter
Action Racing	VS Commodore	71	(Australia) Gerrard McLeod	(Australia) Marcus Zukanovic
Adams Auto Electrics	VS Commodore	77	(Australia) Adam Lloyd	(Australia) Ryan McLeod
Alan Wilson Insurance Brokers	VS Commodore	78	(Australia) Daniel Orr	(Australia) Dean Orr
Donut King	VS Commodore	81	(Australia) Adam Beechey	(Australia) Dean Crosswell
Hurricane Automotive Products	VS Commodore	85	(Australia) Jason Domaschenz	
Southern Star Windows P/L	VS Commodore	99	(Australia) Ross McGregor	(Australia) Steve Owen

* - driver competed in practice only.
** - driver competed in qualifying and race only.

== Calendar ==
The 2010 Commodore Cup National Series consisted of six rounds.

Rd.	Race title	Circuit	City / State	Date	Winner
1	(New South Wales) Wakefield Park	Wakefield Park	Goulburn, New South Wales	6–7 March	Adam Beechey
2	(Victoria (state)) Phillip Island	Phillip Island Grand Prix Circuit	Phillip Island, Victoria	1–2 May	Nick Parker
3	(South Australia) Mallala	Mallala Motor Sport Park	Mallala, South Australia	29–30 May	Tony Bates
4	(Victoria (state)) Winton	Winton Motor Raceway	Benalla, Victoria	26–27 June	Adam Beechey; Dean Crosswell
5	(New South Wales) Eastern Creek	Eastern Creek Raceway	Sydney, New South Wales	11–12 September	Brett Holdsworth
6	(Victoria (state)) Sandown	Sandown International Raceway	Melbourne, Victoria	23–24 October	Marcus Zukanovic

== Points system ==
Pos	1st	2nd	3rd	4th	5th	6th	7th	8th	9th	10th	11th	12th	13th	14th	15th	16th	17th	18th	19th	20th	21st	22nd	23rd	24th	25th	26th	27th	28th	29th	30th	31st	32nd	33rd	34th	35th	36th	37th	38th	39th	40th
3 race weekend	50	45	41	38	36	35	34	33	32	31	30	29	28	27	26	25	24	23	22	21	20	19	18	17	16	15	14	13	12	11	10	9	8	7	6	5	4	3	2	1
2 race weekend	75	68	62	57	54	53	51	50	48	47	45	44	42	41	39	38	36	35	33	32	30	29	27	26	24	23	21	20	18	17	15	14	12	11	9	8	6	5	3	2

- 1 bonus point is awarded for qualifying on pole position.
- Each non-finisher will be awarded a points total that is 10 less than the points they would have been awarded if they had finished the race in the same position.

== Series standings ==
Pos.	Driver	Rd 1	Rd 2	Rd 3	Rd 4	Rd 5	Rd 6	Pts
1	Adam Beechey	127	118	136	137	117	135	770
2	Tony Bates	119	87	150	93	133	94	676
3	Nick Parker	106	141	88	99	100	108	642
4	Scott Andrews	**125**	**137**	**120**	87	**70**	93	632
5	Ross McGregor	101	101	85	**113**	101	118	619
6	Matt Chick	116	98	99	47	99	115	574
7	Josh Hughes	92	108	116	74	113	52	555
8	Mathew Hayes		92	104	115	72	88	471
9	Adam Lloyd	88	112		119	112		431
10	Chris Stevenson	82	80	88	69			319
11	Brett Holdsworth				126	140		266
12	Daniel Orr	48	45		82		75	250
13	Marcus Zukanovic				107		138	245
14	Jason Domaschenz	109	92	34				235
15	Gerrard McLeod			101	107			208
16	Anthony Tancredi	63	53		87			203
17	Garth Duffy	96	81					177
18	Steven Ling			92	82			174
19	David Ling			94	70			164
20	Geoff Fontaine	68	95					163
20	Geoff Emery				93		**70**	163
20	Brian Bancroft	77	86					163
23	Danny Buzadzic				75		87	162
24	Geoff Cowie			77	79			156
25	Dean Crosswell				137			137
26	Lee Holdsworth				126			126
27	Ryan McLeod				119			119
28	Allan Hill	64	54					118
29	Ryan Millier				115			115
30	Steve Owen				**113**			113
31	Darren Hossack				99			99
32	Tim Shaw				87			87
32	Mark Grima				87			87
34	Glenn Mackenzie						86	86
35	David Stevenson				83			83
35	Glen Holdsworth				83			83
37	Richard Whyte				82			82
37	Dean Orr				82			82
39	Alan Langworthy				79			79
40	Sam Walter				75			75
41	Tim Blanchard				74			74
42	Michael Fitzgerald				70			70
43	Kane Millier				69			69
44	Shane Price				47			47
Pos	Driver	Rd 1	Rd 2	Rd 3	Rd 4	Rd 5	Rd 6	Pts

Colour	Result
Gold	Winner
Silver	Second place
Bronze	Third place
Green	Points classification
Blue	Non-points classification
Blue	Non-classified finish (NC)
Purple	Retired, not classified (Ret)
Red	Did not qualify (DNQ)
Red	Did not pre-qualify (DNPQ)
Black	Disqualified (DSQ)
White	Did not start (DNS)
White	Withdrew (WD)
White	Race cancelled (C)
Blank	Did not practice (DNP)
Blank	Did not arrive (DNA)
Blank	Excluded (EX)

- Bold indicates that the driver scored one bonus point for qualifying on pole.
