= Commodore Cup =

Australian motor racing series

- Category: Touring Car Racing; One-make racing
- Country: Australia
- Inaugural season: 1994
- Folded: 2012
- Constructors: Holden
- Tyre suppliers: Dunlop
- Last Drivers' champion: Adam Beechey
- Official website: commodorecup.com.au

The Commodore Cup was an Australian motor racing series. A one-make series originally devised by Victorian racers Maurie Platt and David Gittus, it was named for the car all competitors were required to use in competition, the Holden Commodore.

The category has always been a national series, but also mostly an amateur series. Despite this, the category has produced a V8 Supercar race winner in Lee Holdsworth. The category was one of the core categories of the Shannons Nationals Motor Racing Championships. The most successful driver in the series has been Geoff Emery, who has won the Commodore Cup series five times.

Eligibility was limited to specific Commodore models. Originally, only the first three series were allowed: VB, VC and VH. Motive power was limited to the 4.2-litre version of the Holden V8 engine. The regulations were designed to provide a limited level of performance modification, while not making the category overly expensive to run. The first season was held in 1994. Since its beginning, the category has always been moderately well supported with grid sizes in the 15–25 bracket.

The first major change to series regulations came in 2004 when VR and VS model Commodores were made eligible. The mechanical package was not changed substantially. The later model cars proved to be faster than the older ones, leading to a drop off in numbers of the older model Commodores.

In November 2012, it was announced that the series would fold due to consistently small entry numbers during the season. The cars themselves are still eligible for Improved Production classes.

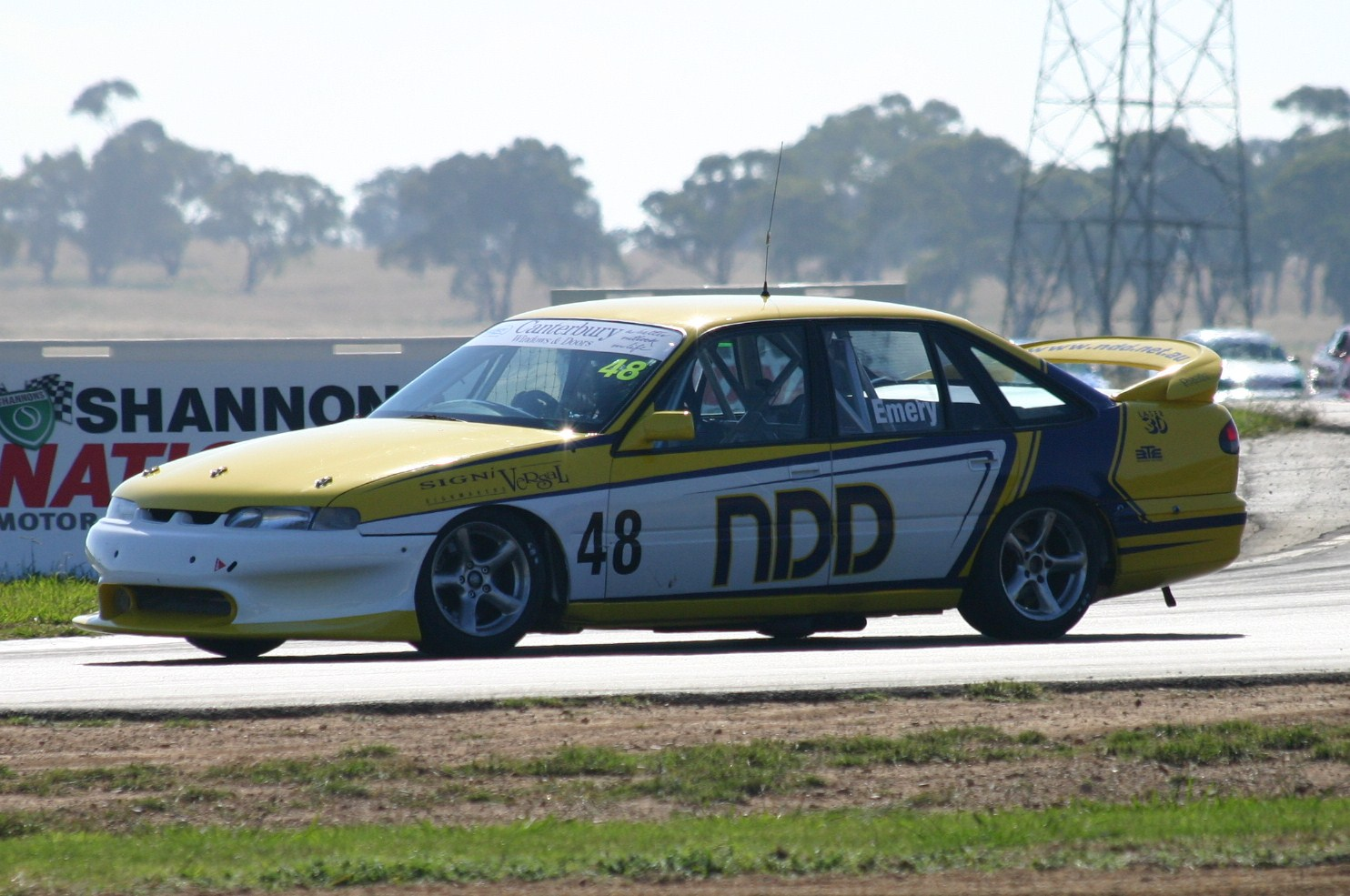
Five time champion Geoff Emery at Wakefield Park, 2011

A Northern Territory state level series based at Hidden Valley Raceway continues to this day.

== Series champions ==
Year	Champion
1994	David Gittus
1995	Gary Baxter
1996	Gary Baxter
1997	Dean Croswell
1998	Maurie Platt
1999	Tim Shaw
2000	Christian D'Agostin
2001	Christian D'Agostin
2002	Geoff Emery
2003	Geoff Emery
2004	Geoff Emery
2005	Geoff Emery
2006	Marcus Zukanovic
2007	Geoff Emery
2008	Michael Tancredi
2009	Brett Holdsworth
2010	Adam Beechey
2011	Adam Beechey
2012	Adam Beechey
