= Scott Andrews (racing driver) =

Australian racing driver (born 1990)

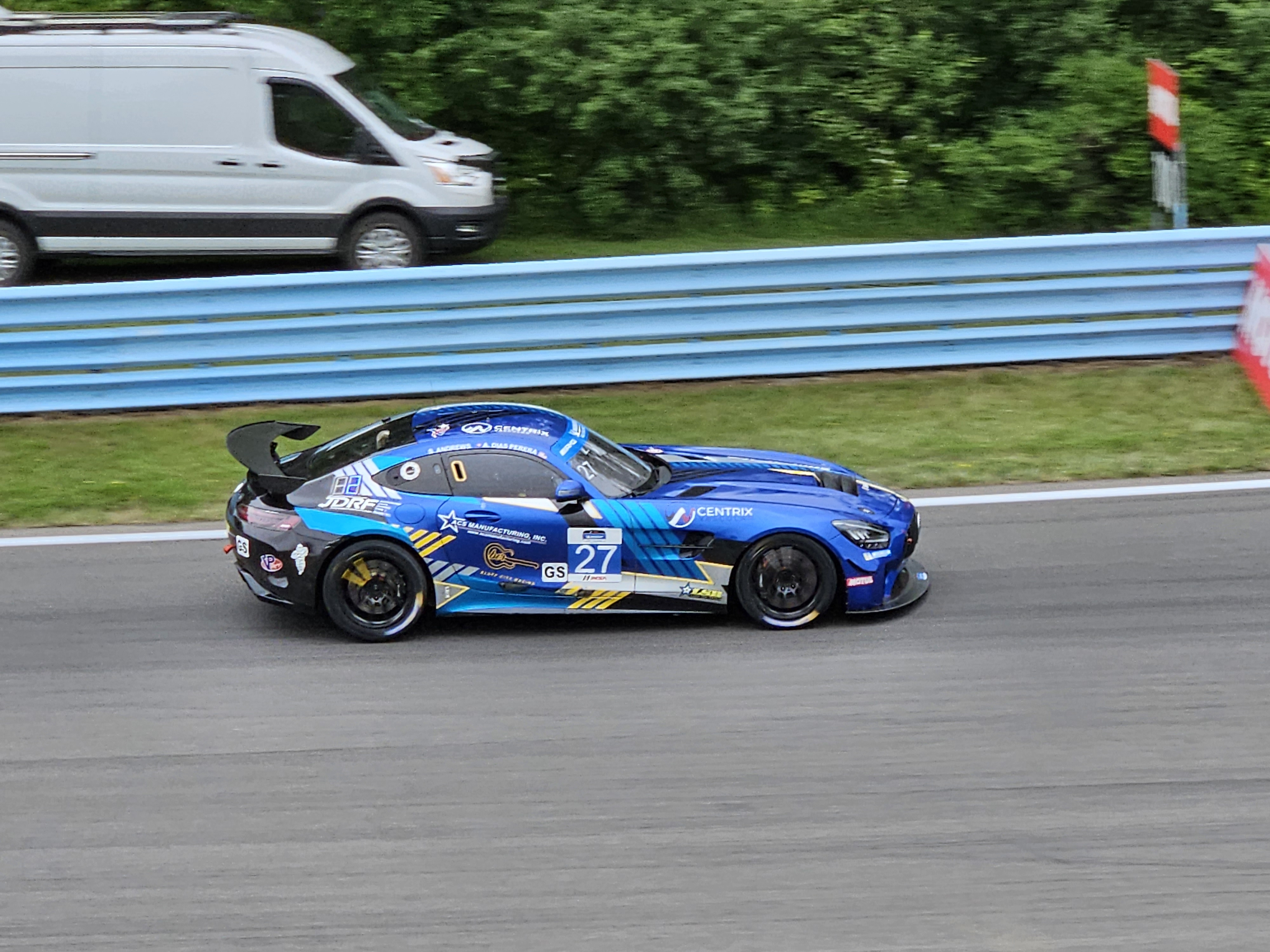
- Andrews in 2024
- Nationality: (Australia) Australian
- Born: 25 August 1990 (age 36) Geelong, Australia
- Categorisation: FIA Silver (until 2021); FIA Gold (2022–)

Championship titles
- 2021 2015: Michelin Endurance Cup – LMP3; F1600 Championship Series

Scott Andrews (born 25 August 1990 in Geelong) is an Australian racing driver who last competed for HP-Tech Motorsport in GT World Challenge America.

Andrews is the 2015 F1600 Championship Series and 2021 IMSA Michelin Endurance Cup LMP3 champion, as well as an LMP2 podium finisher. He has once competed in DPi, with JDC–Miller MotorSports at the 2020 12 Hours of Sebring.

== Early career ==
Andrews started racing in the Australian Commodore Cup Series in 2008, and would stay in the championship until 2011, when he switched to single-seaters on a full-time basis, racing in the Victorian Formula 1600 Series and testing Formula 3 machinery at the end of the year.

With help from James Davison, Andrews joined JDC MotorSports for the final two rounds of the 2013 U.S. F2000 National Championship season. In the four races he contested, he scored a best result of sixth on debut at Laguna Seca. Andrews returned to JDC Motorsports in early 2014, racing in the U.S. F2000 Winterfest. Andrews stayed in the States for 2015, joining Exclusive Autosport to compete in the F1600 Formula F Championship, which he would win with two races to spare at Pittsburgh International Race Complex.

== Prototype career ==
In late 2016, Andrews made his LMP3 debut, joining Wineurasia ahead of the 4 Hours of Fuji. In the three races Andrews drove in, he scored a best result of fifth at Buriram and ended the season 12th in the standings. Following his Asian Le Mans outings, Andrews joined KEO Racing to compete in the opening round of the 2017 Le Mans Cup. Having retired on his debut at Monza, Andrews switched to Graff Racing ahead of the Road to Le Mans. Towards the end of 2018, Andrews joined United Autosports's LMP3 program to race in the final two rounds of European Le Mans Series. On his ELMS debut, Andrews won the rain-shortened 4 Hours of Spa.

Following a season spent in the IMSA Prototype Challenge, Andrews was set to rejoin Gerry Kraut for the 2020 European Le Mans Series season, however due to the pandemic, their entry was withdrawn before the season got underway. Having withdrawn from ELMS, Andrews returned to JDC MotorSports alongside Kraut in IMSA Prototype Challenge. Andrews won at Sebring and Road America and concluded the year fifth in the standings.

At the IMSA season-ending 2020 12 Hours of Sebring, Andrews made his top class debut, joining Matheus Leist and Stephen Simpson in JDC–Miller MotorSports's privateer Cadillac DPi-V.R. Andrews finished fourth, which tied the car's best result of the season.

In late 2020, Andrews joined Riley Motorsports for the endurance rounds of the 2021 IMSA SportsCar Championship. Andrews and teammate Gar Robinson opened up the season by winning the 24 Hours of Daytona in LMP3, and took further wins at Watkins Glen and Road Atlanta to clinch the Michelin Endurance Cup title. During 2021, Andrews also raced in the 2021 Le Mans Cup for United Autosports, with whom he'd score maximum points at Barcelona and win at Monza to end the season fifth in points. Andrews and Kraut would reunite again for the 2023 Le Mans Cup, but the season proved unsuccessful, as they finished 19th in the LMP3 standings.

Having only raced in LMP2 once in 2017, Andrews partnered Gerry Kraut for JDC–Miller MotorSports's one-off LMP2 entry at the Road America round of the 2024 IMSA SportsCar Championship. Andrews achieved a historic podium, coming second to United Autosports's Ben Hanley and Ben Keating on his return to the category. During 2025, Andrews made a one-off return to LMP2 competition for JDC–Miller MotorSports at Road America.

== GT career ==
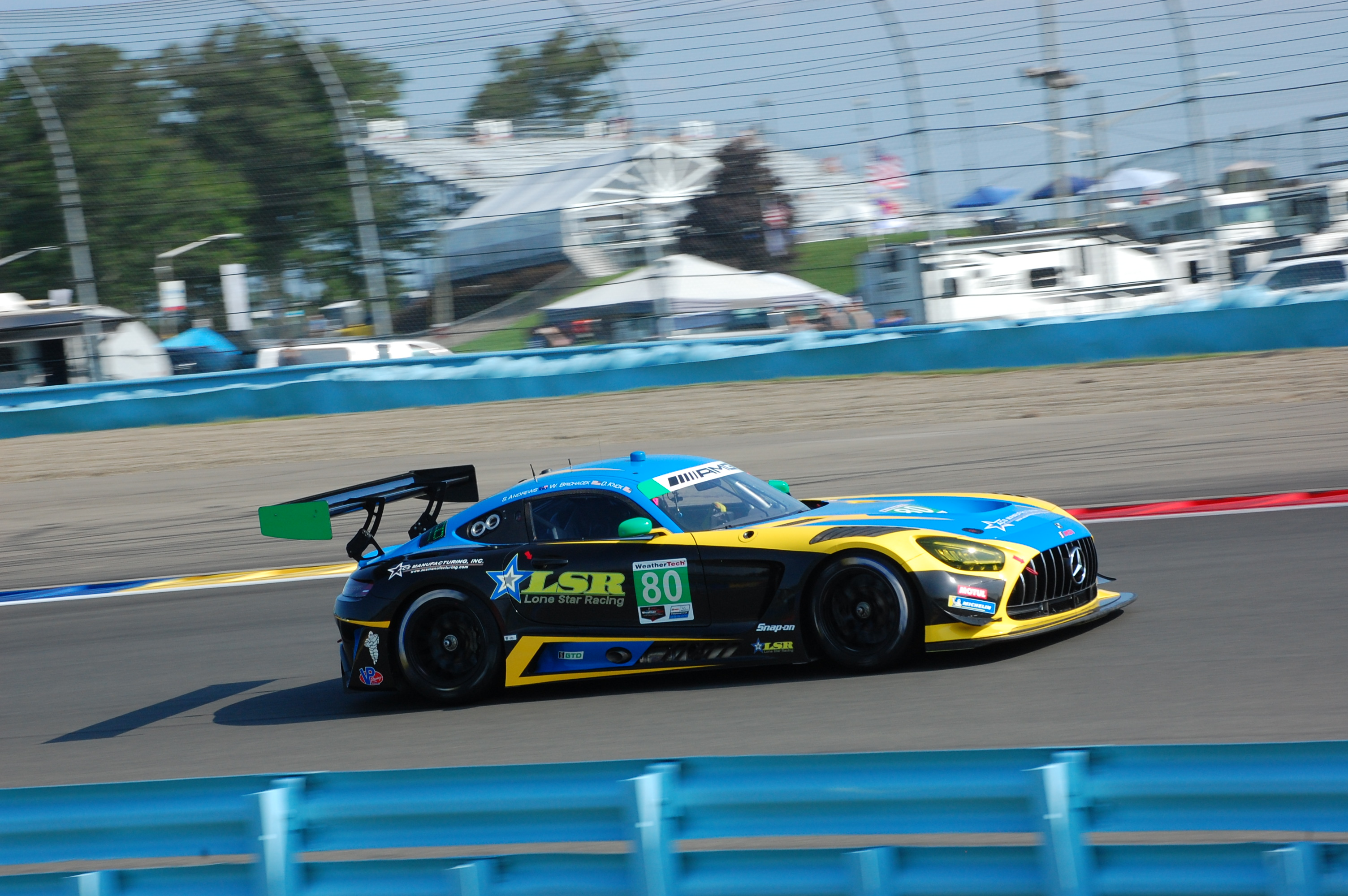
Andrews at the Watkins Glen round of the 2025 IMSA SportsCar season.

In early 2016, Andrews made his GT3 debut at that year's Bathurst 12 Hour, joining Performance West Motorsport alongside Peter Rullo and Nick Percat.

Making his return to GT Racing in 2021, Andrews joined Kessel Racing to compete in the FIA World Endurance Championship, albeit as a guest entry, at the 8 Hours of Portimão and then from the 24 Hours of Le Mans onwards.

In 2023, Andrews joined Lone Star Racing to compete in the GS class of the Michelin Pilot Challenge alongside Anton Dias Perera. Scoring only one podium, a second-place finish at Indianapolis, Andrews returned to GT3 machinery on the same weekend, racing at the Indianapolis round of the IMSA SportsCar Championship with the same team. Andrews remained with Lone Star Racing for 2024, racing in the endurance rounds of the IMSA SportsCar Championship alongside Salih Yoluç and Rui Andrade. The part-time effort yielded mixed results, headlined by a breakthrough pole position at Petit Le Mans, where Andrews gapped the GTD field by three tenths and outqualified several GTD Pro cars.

In early 2025, Andrews joined Geyer Valmont Racing to race in the Bathurst 12 Hour enduro for the first time in nine years. Andrews snuck into the top-ten pole shootout and finished 17th overall and third in Pro-Am. On January 8, 2025, it was announced that Andrews would stay with Lone Star Racing to race in the endurance rounds of the 2025 IMSA SportsCar Championship, in which he scored a best result of ninth at Sebring.

Andrews returned to Lone Star Racing in 2026 to race in the GTD class of the IMSA SportsCar Championship. Competing in all but one of the endurance races with them, Andrews scored a best result of fourth at the 12 Hours of Sebring, as he also made select outings with Aston Martin-fielding van der Steur Racing in GTD and Car Blanche in GTD Pro. During 2026, Andrews also returned to the Bathurst 12 Hour for Geyer Valmont Racing, as well as joining Ferrari-fielding HP-Tech Motorsport to race in select rounds of GT World Challenge America.

== Racing record ==
=== Racing career summary ===
Season	Series	Team	Races	Wins	Poles	F/Laps	Podiums	Points	Position
2008	Australian Commodore Cup National Series		3	0	0	0	0	69	43rd
2009	Australian Commodore Cup National Series	Gordon TAFE/Light Alloy Engines	11	0	1	1	0	376	13th
2010	Australian Commodore Cup National Series	Andrews Motorsport	15	2	4	4	7	632	4th
2010	Queensland Formula Vee Championship		2	0	0	0	1	26	11th
2011	Australian Commodore Cup National Series	Renaissance Homes	4	0	0	0	0	182	21st
2011	Victorian Formula Ford 1600	Project Racing	11	9	4	11	9	260	5th
2012	Formula Ford Australia	Borland Racing Developments; Synergy Motorsport	6	0	0	0	1	30	14th
2012	Victorian Formula Ford 1600		3	2	1	3	2	40	18th
2012	Victorian Formula Ford		5	0	0	0	0	55	20th
2013	U.S. F2000 National Championship	JDC Motorsports	4	0	0	0	0	0	NC†
2013	Valvoline Winton 300		1	0	0	0	0	N/A	11th
2014	U.S. F2000 Winterfest	JDC Motorsports	6	0	0	0	0	78	8th
2014	Formula Ford 1600 Australia	Sean Scott	3	1	1	2	1	21	11th
2015	F1600 Formula F Championship Series	Exclusive Autosport	20	7	3	1	14	723	**1st**
2015	Formula Ford 1600 Australia – Bathurst 12H Support races	Andrews Automotive Torquay	2	1	0	1	2	N/A	**1st**
2015	Walter Hayes Trophy – F1600		1	0	0	0	1	N/A	**3rd**
2015	Toyo Tires F1600 Championship Series – Class A		4	3	3	3	4	378	7th
2016	Bathurst 12 Hour – AA	Performance West Motorsport	1	0	0	0	0	N/A	DNF
2016	Formula Ford 1600 Australia	Ellery Motorsport	3	2	1	2	2	41	8th
2016	Walter Hayes Trophy – F1600		1	0	0	0	0	N/A	DNF
2016–17	Asian Le Mans Series – LMP3	Wineaurasia	3	0	0	0	0	20	12th
2017	Gulf 12 Hours – LMP3 Pro-Am	Graff Racing	1	0	1	0	0	N/A	5th
2017	Le Mans Cup – LMP3	KEO Racing	1	0	0	0	0	12.5	16th
2017	Le Mans Cup – LMP3	Graff Racing	2	0	0	0	0	12.5	16th
2017	Le Mans Cup – LMP3	Duqueine Engineering	1	0	0	0	0	12.5	16th
2017–18	Asian Le Mans Series – LMP2	Eurasia Motorsport	1	0	0	0	0	0	11th
2017–18	Asian Le Mans Series – LMP3	Taiwan Beer GH Motorsport	1	0	0	0	1	18	8th
2018	IMSA Prototype Challenge – LMP3	JDC Motorsports	2	0	0	0	0	73	18th
2018	IMSA Prototype Challenge – LMP3	K2R Motorsports	1	0	0	0	1	73	18th
2018	Le Mans Cup – LMP3	Cool Racing	4	0	0	1	0	19	16th
2018	European Le Mans Series – LMP3	United Autosports	2	1	0	0	2	27.5	11th
2019	IMSA Prototype Challenge	JDC Motorsports	5	0	0	2	1	88	19th
2020	IMSA Prototype Challenge	JDC Motorsports	5	2	0	1	3	148	5th
2020	IMSA SportsCar Championship – DPi	JDC–Miller MotorSports	1	0	0	0	0	28	24th
2021	IMSA SportsCar Championship – LMP3	Riley Motorsports	4	3	0	0	4	1081	9th
2021	Michelin Pilot Challenge – GS	LAP Motorsports	2	0	0	0	0	1370	23rd
2021	Michelin Pilot Challenge – GS	TGR Riley Motorsports	7	0	0	1	1	1370	23rd
2021	Lamborghini Super Trofeo North America – Pro	Ansa Motorsports	2	0	0	0	0	9	13th
2021	Le Mans Cup – LMP3	United Autosports	7	1	0	1	2	52	5th
2021	FIA World Endurance Championship – LMGTE Am	Kessel Racing	4	0	0	0	0	0	NC†
2021	24 Hours of Le Mans – LMGTE Am	Kessel Racing	1	0	0	0	0	N/A	DNF
2022	IMSA SportsCar Championship – LMP3	Riley Motorsports	1	0	1	0	0	558	24th
2022	IMSA SportsCar Championship – LMP3	JDC–Miller MotorSports	1	0	0	0	0	558	24th
2022	IMSA SportsCar Championship – GTD	Gilbert Korthoff Motorsports	1	0	0	0	1	587	37th
2022	IMSA SportsCar Championship – GTD	VasserSullivan	1	0	0	0	0	587	37th
2022	Michelin Pilot Challenge – GS	TGR Riley Motorsports	5	0	0	0	0	1080	29th
2022	Michelin Pilot Challenge – GS	Riley Motorsports	3	0	0	0	0	1080	29th
2022	Le Mans Cup – GT3	Kessel Racing	0	0	0	0	0	0	NC
2023	IMSA SportsCar Championship – GTD	Lone Star Racing	1	0	0	0	0	175	63rd
2023	IMSA SportsCar Championship – LMP3	Riley Motorsports	1	0	0	0	0	558	24th
2023	Michelin Pilot Challenge – GS	Lone Star Racing	10	0	0	3	1	1850	10th
2023	Le Mans Cup – LMP3	United Autosports	5	0	0	0	0	8	19th
2023	Gulf 12 Hours – GT3 Pro-Am	Kessel Racing	1	0	0	0	0	N/A	**2nd**
2024	IMSA SportsCar Championship – LMP2	JDC–Miller MotorSports	1	0	0	0	1	341	38th
2024	IMSA SportsCar Championship – GTD	Lone Star Racing	5	0	1	0	0	945	38th
2024	Michelin Pilot Challenge – GS	van der Steur Racing	2	0	0	1	1	730	30th
2024	Michelin Pilot Challenge – GS	Lone Star Racing	1	0	0	0	0	730	30th
2025	Bathurst 12 Hour – GT3 Pro-Am	Geyer Valmont Racing	1	0	0	0	0	N/A	**3rd**
2025	IMSA SportsCar Championship – GTD	Lone Star Racing	5	0	0	0	0	925	33rd
2025	IMSA SportsCar Championship – LMP2	JDC–Miller MotorSports	1	0	0	0	0	256	52nd
2026	IMSA SportsCar Championship – GTD	Lone Star Racing	4	0	0	0	0	1299	25th
2026	IMSA SportsCar Championship – GTD	van der Steur Racing	1	0	0	0	0	1299	25th
2026	Bathurst 12 Hour – Pro-Am	Geyer Valmont Racing / Tigani Motorsport	1	0	0	0	0	—N/a	4th
2026	Intercontinental GT Challenge	Geyer Valmont Racing / Tigani Motorsport	1	0	0	0	0	0	NC
2026	IMSA SportsCar Championship – GTD Pro	Car Blanche	1	0	0	0	0	236	39th
2026	GT World Challenge America – Pro-Am	HP-Tech Motorsport	2	0	0	0	0	10	17th
2026	GT World Challenge Australia – Pro-Am	Tigani Motorsport							

^{†} As Andrews was a guest driver, he was ineligible to score points.

^{*} Season still in progress.

=== American open-wheel racing results ===
==== U.S. F2000 National Championship ====
Year	Team	1	2	3	4	5	6	7	8	9	10	11	12	13	14	DC	Points
2013	JDC Motorsports	SEB	SEB	STP	STP	LOR	TOR	TOR	MOH	MOH	MOH	LAG; 6	LAG; 9	HOU; 22	HOU; 17	NC†	0

† As Andrews was a guest driver, he was ineligible for points.

=== Complete Asian Le Mans Series results ===
(key) (Races in bold indicate pole position; results in italics indicate fastest lap)

Year	Team	Class	Car	Engine	1	2	3	4	Rank	Pts
2016-17	Wineurasia	LMP3	Ligier JS P3	Nissan VK50VE 5.0 L V8	ZHU	FUJ; Ret	CHA; 5	SEP; 5	12th	20
2017–18	Eurasia Motorsport	LMP2	Ligier JS P2	Nissan VK45DE 4.5 L V8	ZHU	FUJ; Ret			11th	0
2017–18	Taiwan Beer GH Motorsport	LMP3	Ligier JS P3	Nissan VK50VE 5.0 L V8			BUR; 2	SEP	8th	18

=== Complete Le Mans Cup results ===
(key) (Races in bold indicate pole position; results in italics indicate fastest lap)

Year	Entrant	Class	Chassis	1	2	3	4	5	6	7	Rank	Points
2017	KEO Racing	LMP3	Ligier JS P3	MNZ; Ret							16th	12.5
2017	Graff	LMP3	Ligier JS P3		LMS; 16	LMS; Ret				POR; 4	16th	12.5
2017	Duqueine Engineering	LMP3	Ligier JS P3				RBR; Ret	LEC	SPA		16th	12.5
2018	Cool Racing	LMP3	Ligier JS P3	LEC	MNZ; 7						16th	19
2018	Cool Racing	LMP3	Norma M30			LMS; 1; 14	LMS; 2; 17	RBR; 4	SPA	ALG	16th	19
2021	United Autosports	LMP3	Ligier JS P320	BAR; 1	LEC; Ret	MNZ; 1	LMS; 9	LMS; Ret	SPA; 12	POR; 13	5th	52
2022	Kessel Racing	GT3	Ferrari 488 GT3 Evo 2020	LEC	IMO	LMS; 1 DNS	LMS; 2 DNS	MNZ	SPA	ALG	NC	0
2023	United Autosports	LMP3	Ligier JS P320	CAT; 24	LMS; 1; 11	LMS; 2; 5	LEC; 20	ARA	SPA; Ret	ALG; 24	19th	8

=== Complete European Le Mans Series results ===
(key) (Races in bold indicate pole position; results in italics indicate fastest lap)

Year	Entrant	Class	Chassis	Engine	1	2	3	4	5	6	Rank	Points
2018	United Autosports	LMP3	Ligier JS P3	Nissan VK50VE 5.0 L V8	LEC	MNZ	RBR	SIL	SPA; 1	ALG; 3	11th	27.5

=== Complete IMSA SportsCar Championship results ===
(key) (Races in bold indicate pole position; results in italics indicate fastest lap)

Year	Team	Class	Make	Engine	1	2	3	4	5	6	7	8	9	10	11	12	Pos.	Points
2020	JDC–Miller MotorSports	DPi	Cadillac DPi-V.R	Cadillac LT4 5.5 L V8	DAY	DAY	SEB	ELK	ATL	MDO	PET	LGA	SEB; 4				24th	28
2021	Riley Motorsports	LMP3	Ligier JS P320	Nissan VK56DE 5.6 L V8	DAY; 1†	SEB; 3	MDO	WGL; 1	WGL	ELK	PET; 1						9th	1081
2022	Gilbert Korthoff Motorsports	GTD	Mercedes-AMG GT3 Evo	Mercedes-AMG M159 6.2 L V8	DAY; 3												37th	587
2022	Vasser Sullivan Racing	GTD	Lexus RC F GT3	Toyota 2UR-GSE 5.4 L V8		SEB; 7	LBH	LGA	MDO	DET	WGL		LRP		VIR		37th	587
2022	Riley Motorsports	LMP3	Ligier JS P320	Nissan VK56DE 5.6 L V8								**MOS**; 5					24th	558
2022	JDC–Miller MotorSports	LMP3	Duqueine M30 – D08	Nissan VK56DE 5.6 L V8										ELK; 7		PET	24th	558
2023	Lone Star Racing	GTD	Mercedes-AMG GT3 Evo	Mercedes-AMG M159 6.2 L V8	DAY	SEB	LBH	MON	WGL	MOS	LRP		VIR	IMS; 15	PET		63rd	175
2023	JDC–Miller MotorSports	LMP3	Duqueine M30 - D08	Nissan VK56DE 5.6 L V8								ELK; 7					34th	263
2024	Lone Star Racing	GTD	Mercedes-AMG GT3 Evo	Mercedes-AMG M159 6.2 L V8	DAY; 8	SEB; 18	LBH	LGA	WGL; 20	MOS		VIR	IMS; 15	**PET**; 10			38th	945
2024	JDC–Miller MotorSports	LMP2	Oreca 07	Gibson GK428 4.2 L V8							ELK; 2						38th	341
2025	Lone Star Racing	GTD	Mercedes-AMG GT3 Evo	Mercedes-AMG M159 6.2 L V8	DAY; 13	SEB; 9	LBH	LGA	WGL; 19			VIR	IMS; 16	PET; 15			33rd	925
2025	JDC–Miller MotorSports	LMP2	Oreca 07	Gibson GK428 4.2 L V8						MOS; WD	ELK; 9						52nd	256
2026	Lone Star Racing	GTD	Mercedes-AMG GT3 Evo	Mercedes-AMG M159 6.2 L V8	DAY; 6	SEB; 4	LBH			WGL; 10		ELK; 6	VIR	IMS	PET		25th	1299
2026	van der Steur Racing	GTD	Aston Martin Vantage AMR GT3 Evo	Aston Martin AMR16A 4.0 L Turbo V8				LGA; 10									25th	1299
2026	Car Blanche	GTD Pro	Aston Martin Vantage AMR GT3 Evo	Aston Martin AMR16A 4.0 L Turbo V8					DET		MOS; 10						39th	236

^{*} Season still in progress.

=== Complete FIA World Endurance Championship results ===
(key) (Races in bold indicate pole position; races in italics indicate fastest lap)

Year	Entrant	Class	Car	Engine	1	2	3	4	5	6	Rank	Points
2021	Kessel Racing	LMGTE Am	Ferrari 488 GTE Evo	Ferrari F154CB 3.9L Turbo V8	SPA	POR; 4	MON	LMS; Ret	BHR; 9	BHR; 5	NC†	0†

^{†} As Andrews was a guest driver, he was ineligible for championship points.

=== Complete 24 Hours of Le Mans results ===
Year	Team	Co-Drivers	Car	Class	Laps	Pos.	Class Pos.
2021	(Switzerland) Kessel Racing	(Japan) Takeshi Kimura (Denmark) Mikkel Jensen	Ferrari 488 GTE Evo	GTE; Am	128	DNF	DNF
