= 2021 24 Hours of Le Mans =

89th 24 Hours of Le Mans endurance race

Previous: 2020	Next: 2022
Index: Races | Winners

(France) 2021 24 Hours of Le Mans
Event information
- Round 4 of 6 in the 2021 FIA World Endurance Championship
- Date: 21–22 August 2021
- Location: Le Mans, France
- Venue: Circuit de la Sarthe
- Duration: 24 Hours

Results
- Laps completed: 371
- Distance (km): 5055.25
- Distance (miles): 3141
- Hypercar

Pole position
- Time: 3:23.900
- Team: (Japan) Toyota Gazoo Racing
- Drivers: (Japan) Kamui Kobayashi

Winners
- Team: (Japan) Toyota Gazoo Racing
- Drivers: (United Kingdom) Mike Conway (Japan) Kamui Kobayashi (Argentina) José María López
- LMP2

Winners
- Team: (Belgium) Team WRT
- Drivers: (Netherlands) Robin Frijns (Austria) Ferdinand Habsburg (France) Charles Milesi
- LMP2 Pro-Am

Winners
- Team: (United States) DragonSpeed USA
- Drivers: (United Kingdom) Ben Hanley (Sweden) Henrik Hedman (Colombia) Juan Pablo Montoya
- GTE Pro

Winners
- Team: (Italy) AF Corse
- Drivers: (United Kingdom) James Calado (France) Côme Ledogar (Italy) Alessandro Pier Guidi
- GTE Am

Winners
- Team: (Italy) AF Corse
- Drivers: (France) François Perrodo (Denmark) Nicklas Nielsen (Italy) Alessio Rovera

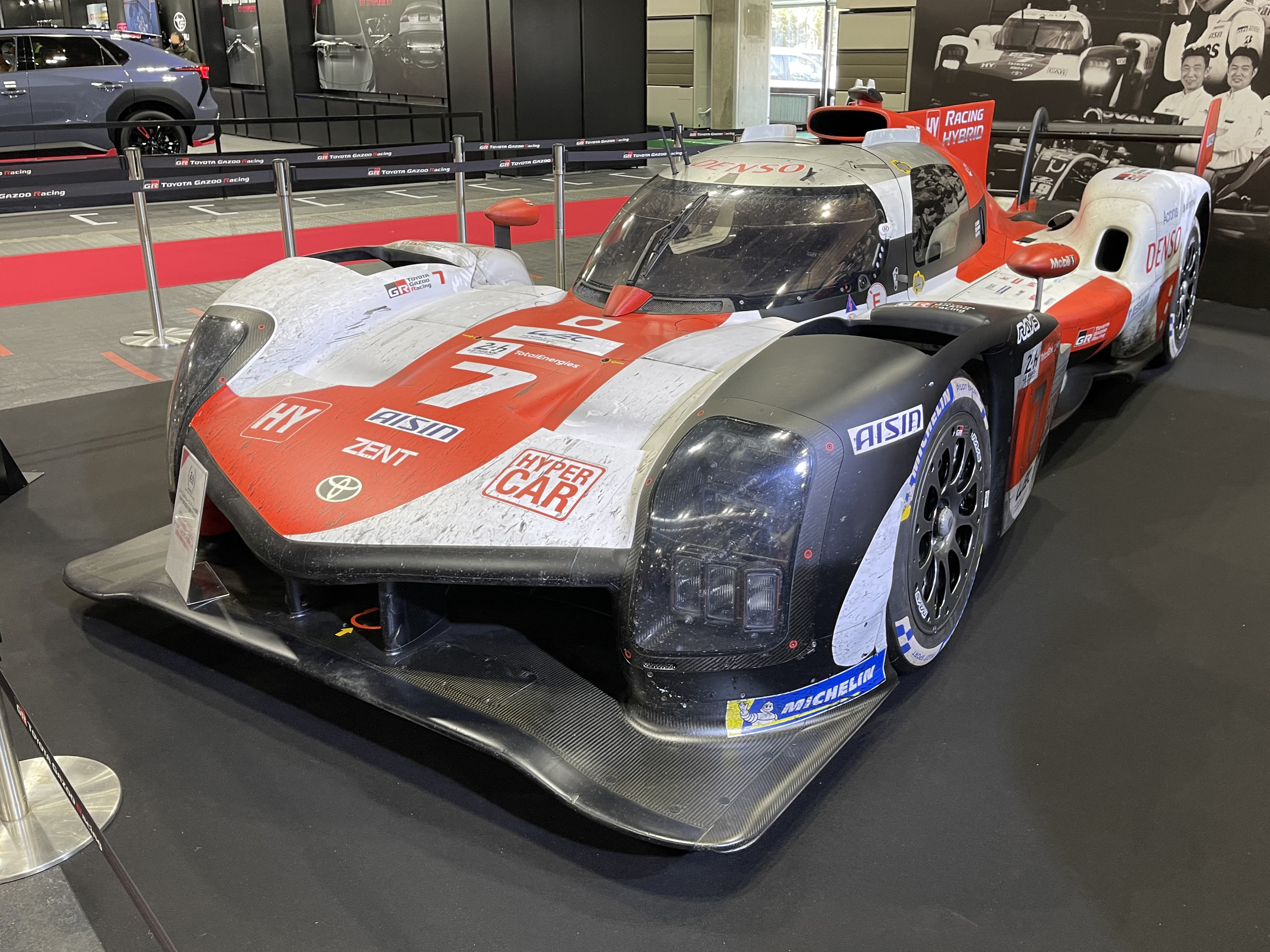
The race-winning No. 7 Toyota GR010 Hybrid.

The 89th 24 Hours of Le Mans (French: 89^{e} 24 Heures du Mans) was a 24-hour automobile endurance race for teams of three drivers each entering Le Mans Prototype (LMP) and Le Mans Grand Touring Endurance (LMGTE) cars held between 21 and 22 August 2021, at the Circuit de la Sarthe, close to Le Mans, France, before 50,000 spectators. It was the event's 89th edition, as organised by the automotive group, the Automobile Club de l'Ouest (ACO) since 1923. The event, the fourth round of the 2021 FIA World Endurance Championship, was postponed from June to August to increase the likelihood of admitting spectators to the race amidst the COVID-19 pandemic in France. A test day was held a week prior to the event on 15 August.

The race was the first Le Mans event to feature the new Le Mans Hypercar regulations as its highest class, replacing the LMP1 class. A Toyota GR010 Hybrid shared by Mike Conway, Kamui Kobayashi and José María López began from pole position after Kobayashi set the overall fastest lap time in the Hyperpole session. The trio led for most of the race to achieve their first Le Mans victories and Toyota's fourth in succession. Their teammates Sébastien Buemi, Brendon Hartley and Kazuki Nakajima finished two laps behind in second; Alpine's Nicolas Lapierre, André Negrão and Matthieu Vaxivière, who shared an Alpine A480-Gibson car, completed the overall podium.

The debuting Team WRT squad of Robin Frijns, Ferdinand Habsburg and Charles Milesi won the Le Mans Prototype 2 (LMP2) class by 0.727 seconds over Jota Sport's Tom Blomqvist, Sean Gelael and Stoffel Vandoorne after the second WRT crew of Louis Delétraz, Robert Kubica and Yifei Ye failed to complete the final lap because of a throttle sensor problem stopping their class-leading Oreca 07 entry. Ferrari won the Le Mans Grand Touring Endurance Professional (LMGTE Pro) class with an AF Corse-fielded Ferrari 488 GTE Evo shared by James Calado, Côme Ledogar and Alessandro Pier Guidi beating Corvette Racing's Nicky Catsburg, Antonio García and Jordan Taylor in a Chevrolet Corvette C8.R by 41.686 seconds. The Italian marque also won the Le Mans Grand Touring Endurance Amateur (LMGTE Am) category for the first time with AF Corse's Nicklas Nielsen, François Perrodo and Alessio Rovera ahead of TF Sport's Felipe Fraga, Ben Keating and Dylan Pereira in an Aston Martin Vantage AMR.

Conway, Kobayashi and López's victory promoted them atop the Hypercar Drivers' Championship by nine points over their teammates, Buemi, Hartley and Nakajima, whose second-place finish demoted them to second. Alpine's Lapierre, Negrão and Vaxivière maintained their hold on third position. Calado and Pier Guidi, with 124 points, overtook Porsche's Kévin Estre and Neel Jani for the GTE Drivers' Championship. Toyota and Ferrari left Le Mans as the respective Hypercar World Endurance and GTE Manufacturers' Championship leaders with two races left in the season.

== Background ==
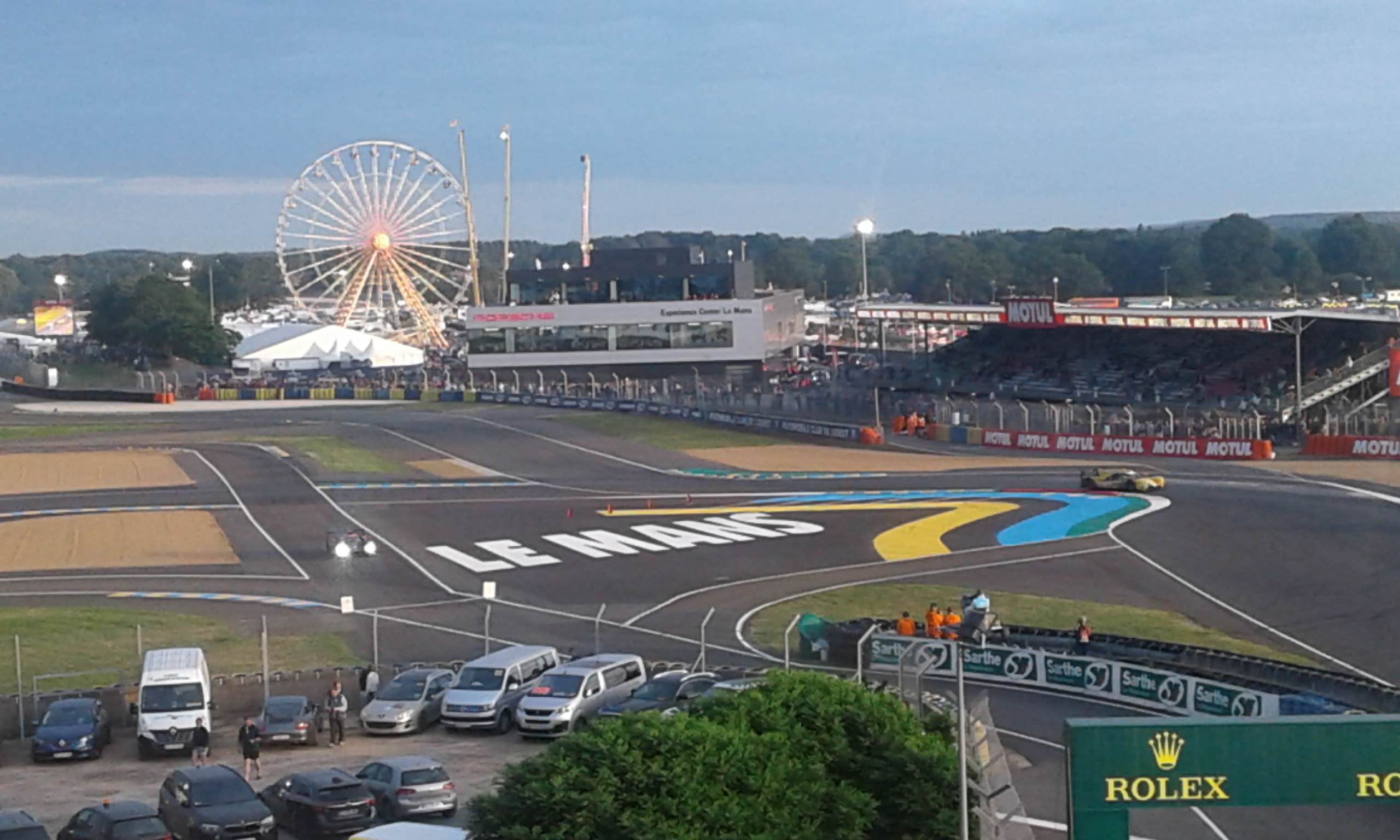
The Circuit de la Sarthe, where the race was held

Pre-race, Toyota trio Sébastien Buemi, Brendon Hartley and Kazuki Nakajima led the Hypercar Drivers' Championship with 75 points, over their teammates Mike Conway, Kamui Kobayashi and José María López with 69 points. With 60 points, Alpine's Nicolas Lapierre, André Negrão and Matthieu Vaxivière were third, with Glickenhaus' Romain Dumas and Richard Westbrook fourth. In the GTE Drivers' Championship, Porsche's Kévin Estre and Neel Jani led with 76 points ahead of AF Corse's James Calado and Alessandro Pier Guidi in second, and their third-placed teammates Miguel Molina and Daniel Serra. Toyota led Alpine in the Hypercar World Endurance Championship, and Ferrari led Porsche in the GTE Manufacturers' Championship.

The 2021 event, the 89th running of the race, was to be staged at the Circuit de la Sarthe close to Le Mans, France, between 12 and 13 June; because of the COVID-19 pandemic in France, the ACO postponed it to 21 and 22 August to increase the likelihood of admitting spectators pending easing of global travel restrictions based on local vaccine administration rates. It was made the fourth, not the third round of the 2021 FIA World Endurance Championship. The ACO confirmed it would admit a maximum of about 50,000 spectators to the circuit, approximately 20 percent of its normal 250,000 attendance. Attendees had to present a French Government health passport proving full vaccination, a negative COVID-19 lateral flow test taken within 48 hours, or provide proof of a previous COVID infection between fifteen days to six months and be deemed immune. Face masks had to be worn; the paddock was separated from each of the fan sections.

== Regulation change ==
A new Le Mans Hypercar (LMH) class, with regulations intended to reduce costs and improve competition created jointly by the ACO and the Fédération Internationale de l'Automobile (FIA), replaced the ageing and more expensive Le Mans Prototype LMP1 category. Manufacturers were allowed to construct either specifications of road-going cars or specifically designed prototype vehicles powered by either a hybrid or a non-hybrid system. The minimum weight and maximum power output of LMH class cars were capped.

== Entries ==
Entries for the race were open from 4 December 2020 to 23 February 2021. The ACO granted 62 invitations and entries were divided between the LMH, Le Mans Prototype 2 (LMP2), Le Mans Grand Touring Endurance Professional (LMGTE Pro) and Le Mans Grand Touring Endurance Amateur (LMGTE Am) classes.

=== Automatic entries ===
Teams that won their class in the 2020 24 Hours of Le Mans, or won championships in the European Le Mans Series (ELMS), Asian Le Mans Series (ALMS), and the Michelin Le Mans Cup (MLMC) earned automatic entry invitations. The second-place finishers in the 2020 ELMS in LMP2 and LMGTE championships each earned an automatic invitation. Two participants from the IMSA SportsCar Championship (IMSA) were chosen by the ACO to be automatic entries, regardless of their performance or category. As teams were granted invitations, they were allowed to change their cars from the previous year but not their category. The 2020 European and 2021 Asian LMP3 (Le Mans Prototype 3) champion was required to field an entry in LMP2. The 2020 MLMC Group GT3 (GT3) champion was limited to the LMGTE Am category.

The ACO announced the final list of automatic entries on 5 March 2021. GPX Racing chose to forgo its automatic invitation because the team did not believe they had the equipment necessary to compete at Le Mans.

Automatic entries for the 2021 24 Hours of Le Mans
Reason invited	LMP2	LMGTE Am
1st in the 24 Hours of Le Mans	(United Kingdom) United Autosports	(United Kingdom) TF Sport
1st in the European Le Mans Series (LMP2 and LMGTE)	(United Kingdom) United Autosports	(Germany) Proton Competition
2nd in the European Le Mans Series (LMP2 and LMGTE)	(United Kingdom) United Autosports	(Switzerland) Kessel Racing
1st in the European Le Mans Series (LMP3)	(United Kingdom) United Autosports	
IMSA SportsCar Championship at-large entries	(United States) Patrick Kelly	(United States) Ryan Hardwick
1st in the Asian Le Mans Series (LMP2 and GT)	(Russia) G-Drive Racing	(Germany) Precote Herberth Motorsport
1st in the Asian Le Mans Series (LMP3)	(United Kingdom) United Autosports	
2nd in the Asian Le Mans Series (GT)		(United Arab Emirates) GPX Racing
3rd in the Asian Le Mans Series (GT)		(Germany) Rinaldi Racing
4th in the Asian Le Mans Series (GT)		(United Kingdom) Inception Racing with Optimum Motorsport
1st in the Michelin Le Mans Cup (GT3)		(Italy) Iron Lynx

=== Entry list and reserves ===
The ACO announced the full 62 car entry list on 9 March. In addition to the 33 guaranteed WEC entries, 14 came from the ELMS, five from IMSA, seven from the ALMS and two one-off Le Mans entries. There were 30 cars in the two LMP classes, 31 in each of the two LMGTE categories and one innovative entry. In addition to the 62 entries given invitations for the race, four were put on a reserve list to replace any withdrawn or ungranted invitations. Reserve entries were ordered with the first replacing the first withdrawal from the race, regardless of the class and entry. They were chosen based on their sporting and technical quality, fan, media and public interest and commitment, and loyalty to other ACO-administered series.

=== Garage 56 ===
The Garage 56 concept to test new technologies at Le Mans returned after a half-decade absence. (Note: Garage 56's naming origins date back to its first entry, the DeltaWing car occupying the 56th pit garage at the 2012 race.) The ACO granted the innovative spot to Frédéric Sausset's La Filière by SRT41 team, who had deferred their planned entry from the 2020 event to the following year's race because of the COVID-19 pandemic. It entered the Graff-prepared No. 84 Oreca 07-Gibson car converted to an adapted automobile fitted with a braking, clutch and throttle system controlled by paraplegic drivers Takuma Aoki and Nigel Bailly from a hand-controlled steering wheel. Their non-disabled co-driver Matthieu Lahaye could drive the vehicle normally. The team participated in the four-hour ELMS rounds in France and Spain as a precursor to the longer race at Le Mans.

== Pre-race balance of performance changes ==
The FIA and ACO imposed a balance of performance to maintain a separation between the Hypercar and LMP2 categories. The Alpine A480-Gibson car received a maximum stint energy allowance of 844 MJ (234 kWh), a 74 MJ (21 kWh) reduction from 918 MJ (255 kWh) or eight per cent from the preceding 6 Hours of Monza. The Glickenhaus SCG 007 LMH and Toyota GR010 Hybrid vehicles had no performance changes. In LMGTE Pro, 10 kg (22 lb) of weight was removed from the Ferrari 488 GTE Evo for easier handling, and its fuel capacity was raised by 5 L (1.1 imp gal; 1.3 US gal). The Porsche 911 RSR-19 received 1 kg (2.2 lb) weight, 1 L (0.22 imp gal; 0.26 US gal) fuel capacity, and 0.7 mm (0.028 in) air restrictor diameter increases. The LMGTE Am minimum weights were shared by each team per manufacturer, with the Ferraris and Porsches 10 kg (22 lb) heavier than their Pro equivalents and the Aston Martin Vantage AMR lighter at 1,257 kg (2,771 lb).

== Testing ==
A test day held on 15 August, one week prior to the race, required all entrants to participate in eight hours of driving divided into two sessions. A majority of signed drivers were involved as well as actor Michael Fassbender driving the No. 77 Dempsey-Proton Racing Porsche; Emmanuel Collard was the No. 83 AF Corse Ferrari's test driver; Laurents Hörr shared the Duqueine Team Oreca 07-Gibson; Gustavo Menezes was nominated to drive both of the Glickenhaus entries, and Pierre Sancinéna joined SRT41's team for test day. Only 11 drivers were granted dispensation to miss testing because they were entered in Formula E's season-ending Berlin ePrix.

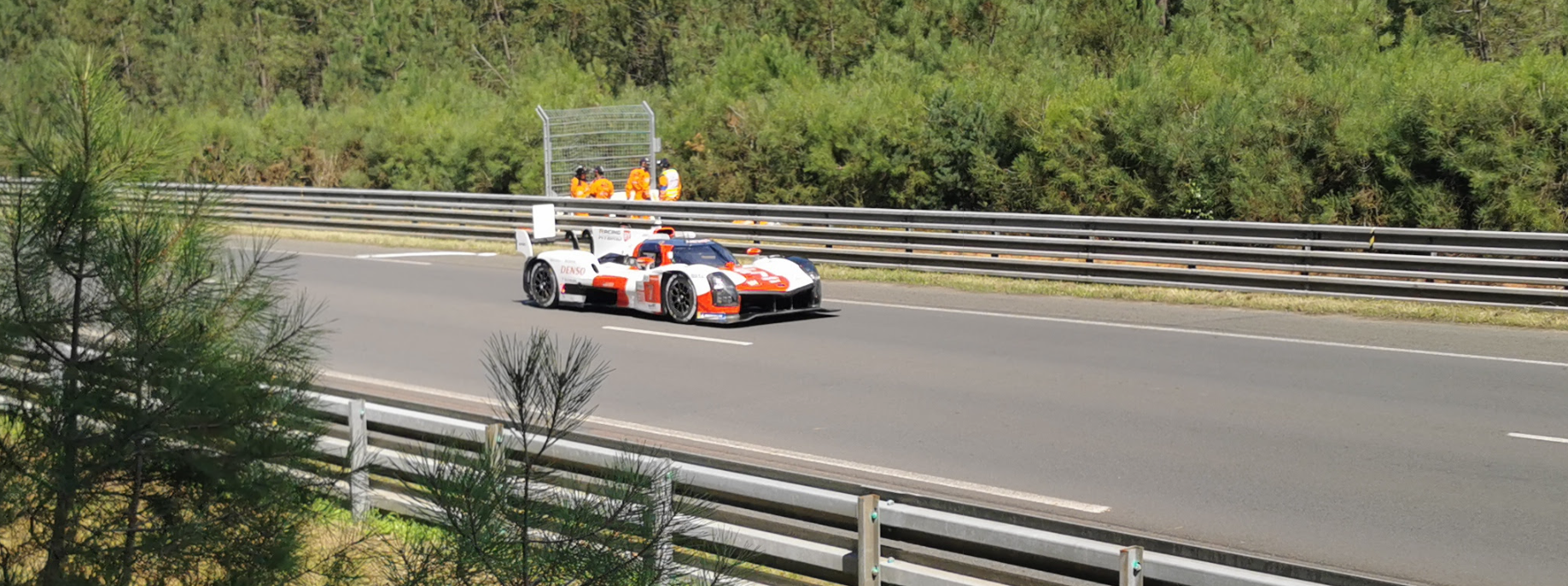
Toyota GR010 Hybrid being driven during the test day

Toyota led the first session with a 3:31.263-minute lap by Hartley in the No. 8 Toyota. Lapierre was a quarter of a second slower in the grandfathered LMP1 No. 36 Alpine A480 car; Conway's No. 7 Toyota recorded the third-quickest lap. Olivier Pla put the No. 709 Glickenhaus fourth overall. Paul di Resta set the fastest LMP2 lap time with a 3:33.429 driving the No. 23 United Autosports Oreca, ahead of Phil Hanson's No. 22 sister car, Yifei Ye's debuting No. 41 Team WRT entry and Oliver Jarvis' No. 82 Risi Competizione vehicle. Porsche were first and second in LMGTE Pro with Estre's No. 92 car ahead of the No. 91 sister team of Gianmaria Bruni. The highest-placed Ferrari was Calado's third-placed No. 51 AF Corse entry. Marcos Gomes' No. 98 Aston Martin led LMGTE Am from Alessio Picariello's No. 18 Absolute Racing and Julien Andlauer's No. 88 Dempsey-Proton Porsches. Separate accidents by Satori Hoshino's No. 777 D'Station Racing Aston Martin at the Porsche Curves, Tom Gamble's GR Racing No. 86 Porsche and John Hartstone under braking for the first Mulsanne chicane in Aston Martin's No. 95 entry on the Mulsanne Straight led to stoppages during the session.

The second session saw Glickenhaus move atop when Pla turned in a 3:29.115-minute lap in the No. 709 car with less than ten minutes left. Conway improved the No. 7 Toyota to second place after leading for most of the session; Nakajima's No. 8 car went from first to third. Lapierre's No. 36 Alpine was fourth with Romain Dumas' No. 708 Gilckenhaus fifth. Paul-Loup Chatin bettered LMP2's fastest lap with a time of 3:31.105, leading IDEC Sport's No. 48 team ahead of Will Stevens' No. 65 Panis Racing car and Louis Delétraz's No. 41 WRT entry. United Autosports fell to fourth and fifth after laps by Di Resta and Filipe Albuquerque. In LMGTE Pro, Porsche took the first three positions as Earl Bamber led with a 3:52.901-minute time in the No. 79 WeatherTech Racing Porsche, but he did not better Estre's first session lap. The German company also led in LMGTE Am with the fastest lap set by Harry Tincknell in the No. 99 Proton Competition car. There were three deployments of the full course yellow flag procedure. Roberto Lacorte stopped Cetilar Racing's No. 47 Ferrari before Mulsanne corner with a rear axle failure, Scott Andrews ran wide onto artificial grass and into the Porsche Curves gravel trap in Kessel's No. 57 Ferrari and Bruni spun entering the Dunlop chicane.

=== After testing ===
IDEC Sport reconstructed the No. 17 Oreca around a new chassis during the session following contact with Dwight Merriman and the No. 31 WRT car. IDEC subsequently signed former Rebellion driver Thomas Laurent to share the No. 17 car replacing the injured Kyle Tilley, who had withdrawn from the NASCAR Cup and Xfinity Series races at Indianapolis Motor Speedway.

== Practice ==
The first three-hour practice session took place on the afternoon of 18 August. López lapped fastest at 3:29.309, 0.086 seconds quicker than Negrao in second, who was 0.001 seconds ahead of Nakajima in third. Hanson led LMP2, followed by Nyck de Vries' No. 26 G-Drive Racing entry with a 3:29.441-minute lap, and Tom Blomqvist's No. 28 Jota car; they finished fourth, fifth and eighth quickest overall. The trio separated Westbrook's and Pla's Glickenhaus Hypercars in sixth and seventh overall. Daniel Serra's No. 52 AF Corse Ferrari led the Pro class of LMGTE with a 3:50.123-minute lap as Nick Tandy's No. 64 Chevrolet Corvette C8.R was within 0.040 seconds of the Ferrari. Matteo Cairoli's No. 56 Team Project 1 Porsche was fastest in LMGTE Am and the third-quickest amongst all LMGTE entrants as Porsche occupied first to fourth in the Amateur category. Marco Sørensen damaged the No. 20 High Class Racing car's front-right corner in a collision with a tyre barrier exiting the pit lane. António Félix da Costa's No. 28 Jota entry collided with Antonio Fuoco's No. 47 Cetilar car at Tertre Rouge turn; both accidents forced separate stoppages to the session.

The shorter two-hour session followed that evening. Buemi led with a 3:29.351-minute lap ahead of his teammate Kobayashi by 0.387 seconds as Pipo Derani carried the No. 708 Glickenhaus to third. Jota's Anthony Davidson recorded the fastest LMP2 lap with a time of 3:32.390. Norman Nato's No. 70 Realteam Racing and the No. 22 United Autosports and No. 26 G-Drive cars were second to fourth. Porsche led both LMGTE classes with Laurens Vanthoor's WeatherTech and Frédéric Makowiecki's No. 91 cars heading the Pro category with Andlauer the fastest Amateur class driver in the No. 88 Dempsey-Proton vehicle over Jeroen Bleekemolen's No. 388 Rinaldi Racing Ferrari. Serra locked up heavily at Mulsanne Corner and sustained a right-front puncture damaging his car's right-front corner. With the car stopped just past Arnage corner, this caused a red-flag period for removal and debris cleanup. The session concluded three minutes early when Robby Foley struck the Tertre Rouge corner tyre barriers with the rear of the No. 46 Project 1 car. Foley left the vehicle unaided.

Less than ten minutes before the third practice session, the FIA Endurance Committee issued an updated bulletin detailing immediate balance of performance adjustments to the LMGTE Pro and Am class Ferrari 488 GTEs, lowering its boost levels across all RPM ranges equating to a decrease of 8 hp (6.0 kW) and consequently reducing the car's fuel capacity by 1 L (0.22 imp gal; 0.26 US gal).

The next three-hour session was held the following afternoon. Lapierre's lap of 3:26.594 set late in the session demoted Conway to second. Hartley was third with Pla fourth. Félix da Costa set LMP2's quickest lap of 3:30.213, moving Fabio Scherer's No. 22 United Autosports car to second with his teammate Di Resta third. Estre led LMGTE Pro as Bamber's WeatherTech and Richard Lietz's No. 91 entries ensured the German marque held the first three positions in class. Porsche occupied the top four places in LMGTE Am with Andlauer's No. 88 Dempsey-Proton car leading Cairoli's No. 56 Project 1 and Matt Campbell's No. 77 Dempsey-Proton entries. There were a series of accidents stopping the session twice. Separate crashes by Merriman's No. 17 IDEC car and Juan Pablo Montoya's No. 21 DragonSpeed entering the Dunlop Curve corner saw front and rear damage to both vehicles and required repairs to the right-hand side barriers and track cleanups. Nakajima removed the No. 8 Toyota's rear wing crashing into the left-hand Indianapolis corner wall and returned to the pit lane following trackside recovery.

The final two-hour session was staged later that evening, beginning ten minutes late because of a delay in Hyperpole. Nakajima led with a 3: 27.994-minute time, followed by Lapierre in second, Kobayashi in third, and Ryan Briscoe's No. 709 Glickenhaus in fourth. Franco Colapinto put the No. 26 G-Drive car atop LMP2 at 3:31.414, ahead of Job van Uitert's No. 29 Racing Team Nederland and Albuquerque's No. 22 United Autosports entries. Vanthoor's WeatherTech Porsche led LMGTE Pro and Nicklas Nielsen's AF Corse's No. 83 Ferrari paced LMGTE Am. The session was ended prematurely, with fifteen minutes remaining, when Ollie Millroy lost control of the Inception Ferrari on the inside kerb entering the Ford Chicane at high speed and damaging its right-rear corner against the barrier. IDEC sidelined its No. 17 car for repairs following its third practice session accident as was the No. 49 High Class car, which was undergoing an engine change. Inception Racing worked late in the evening to rebuild their Ferrari around a replacement chassis.

== Qualifying ==
Divided into two sessions, the first one-hour qualifying session determined the race's starting order except for the fastest six vehicles in each class. They advanced to a half-hour shootout called "Le Mans Hyperpole", which determined the car to start on pole position in all four classes. Cars were placed in starting order by category, with every Hypercar at the front of the field regardless of lap time, followed by LMP2, LMGTE Pro and LMGTE Am. The vehicles were placed with the six qualifying Hyperpole cars by quickest Hyperpole session lap time first, followed by the rest of the non-qualifying Hyperpole class vehicles by fastest lap time set during the first qualifying session.

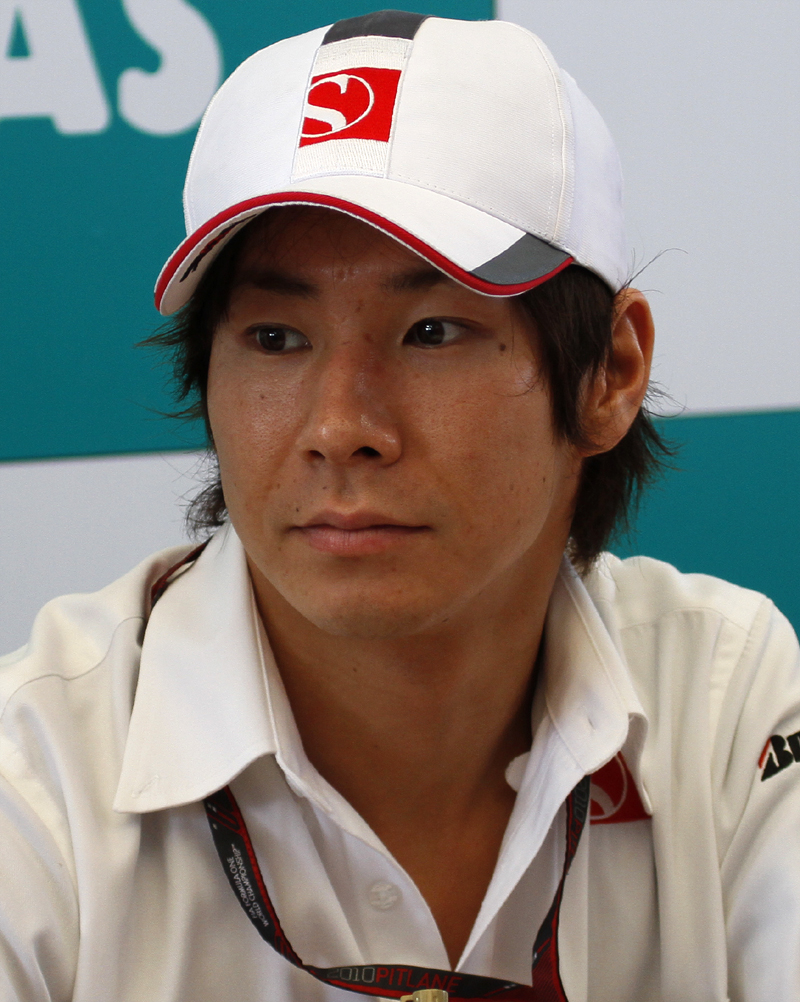
Kamui Kobayashi (pictured in 2010) qualified fastest overall for the fourth time at Le Mans

The five entries in the LMP1 class progressed to the Hyperpole portion of qualifying with the fastest time being a 3:26.279-minute lap by Kobayashi in the No. 7 Toyota in the first half of the session. In LMP2, the qualifiers were Félix da Costa's No. 38 Jota entry along with entries from De Vries of Racing Team Nederland, Delétraz's No. 41 WRT car, Panis Racing's No. 65 car with Will Stevens, and the No. 32 and 23 United Autosports vehicles of Nico Jamin and Di Resta. The LMGTE Pro Hyperpole qualifiers were Serra's No. 52 and Calado's 51 AF Corse Ferraris as well as Estre's No. 92 Porsche, Tandy's No. 64 Corvette, Hub Auto Racing's Dries Vanthoor and Bruni's No. 91 Porsche. LMGTE Am saw the four competing manufacturers qualify for the Hyperpole portion of qualifying. They were Andlauer's No. 88 Dempsey-Proton Porsche, Ben Barker's GR Racing entry, Fuoco's No. 47 Cetilar Ferrari, Inception Racing's No. 71 Ferrari used by Ben Barnicoat, Cairoli's No. 56 Team Project 1 Porsche and TF Sport's No. 33 Aston Martin of Felipe Fraga. Paul Dalla Lana lost control of the No. 98 Aston Martin and spun backwards in the gravel trap at the Dunlop Esses. Rahel Frey's No. 85 Ferrari almost did the same at this corner. Both incidents disrupted the session.

Kobayashi recorded the fastest lap at 3:23.900 to achieve his fourth pole position and third in succession in five years at Le Mans. Hartley put the other Toyota second and Lapierre's Alpine was the highest-placed grandfathered LMP1 car third ahead of the Glickenhaus' of Pla and Dumas. Jota's Félix da Costa claimed the LMP2 pole position with a 3:27.950-minute lap. In second through sixth were the WRT (Delétraz), Panis Racing (Stevens), G-Drive (De Vries), and the United Autosports (Jamin and Di Resta) entries. The three GTE manufacturers occupied the first three places in LMGTE Pro. Dries Vanthoor secured the class pole position in the HubAuto Porsche ahead of Serra of AF Corse and Tandy's Corvette. Porsche qualified in the first three positions in LMGTE Am with Andlauer's Dempsey-Proton vehicle on pole position from Barker's GR Racing entry and Cairoli's Project 1 car. Estre lost control entering Indianapolis corner and damaged the No. 92 Porsche's rear-end, striking the barrier on the driver's right at high speed, which stopped the session with 22 minutes remaining.

After qualifying, Porsche began replacing the No. 92 car's heavily damaged chassis with a replacement but were not permitted by ACO regulations to switch the vehicle completely. Porsche were given a 20-minute shakedown session to test the reconstructed vehicle on the nearby Le Mans Airport runway during the night of 20 August. The WEC Committee opted to lower the LMGTE Pro-class Chevrolet Corvette C8.R's minimum weight by 7 kg (15 lb) to 1,269 kg (2,798 lb) and reduce its fuel capacity by 1 L (0.22 imp gal; 0.26 US gal); the Ferrari 488 GTE Evo's fuel capacity was reduced by 3 L (0.66 imp gal; 0.79 US gal) in a Balance of Performance adjustment. That same day, IDEC withdrew its No. 17 car following Merriman's third practice session accident, lowering the field to 61 entries.

=== Qualifying results ===
Pole positions in each class are denoted in bold.

Final qualifying classification
Pos.	Class	No.	Team	Qualifying	Hyperpole	Grid
**1**	**Hypercar**	**7**	**Toyota Gazoo Racing**	3:26.279	**3:23.900**	1
2	Hypercar	8	Toyota Gazoo Racing	3:27.671	3:24.195	2
3	Hypercar	36	Alpine Elf Matmut	3:27.095	3:25.574	3
4	Hypercar	708	Glickenhaus Racing	3:28.256	3:25.639	4
5	Hypercar	709	Glickenhaus Racing	3:29.381	3:27.656	5
**6**	**LMP2**	**38**	**Jota**	**3:28.807**	**3:27.950**	6
7	LMP2	41	Team WRT	3:29.441	3:28.470	7
8	LMP2	65	Panis Racing	3:29.508	3:28.586	8
9	LMP2	26	G-Drive Racing	3:29.246	3:28.943	9
10	LMP2	32	United Autosports	3:29.688	3:29.078	10
11	LMP2	23	United Autosports	3:29.830	3:30.027	11
12	LMP2	28	Jota	3:29.835		12
13	**LMP2 Pro-Am**	**70**	**Realteam Racing**	**3:29.861**		13
14	LMP2 Pro-Am	24	PR1 Motorsports Mathiasen	3:30.123		14
15	LMP2	48	IDEC Sport	3:30.166		15
16	LMP2	31	Team WRT	3:30.182		16
17	LMP2	22	United Autosports USA	3:30.234		17
18	LMP2 Pro-Am	21	DragonSpeed USA	3:30.323		18
19	LMP2	82	Risi Competizione	3:30.418		19
20	LMP2	30	Duqueine Team	3:30.691		20
21	LMP2 Pro-Am	17	IDEC Sport	3:30.709		WD (Note: The No. 17 IDEC Sport Oreca-Gibson was withdrawn following Dwight Merriman's crash entering the Dunlop Curves in Free Practice 3.)
22	LMP2 Pro-Am	29	Racing Team Nederland	3:30.843		21
23	LMP2	34	Inter Europol Competition	3:30.908		22
24	LMP2 Pro-Am	25	G-Drive Racing	3:31.203		23
25	LMP2	49	High Class Racing	3:31.830		24
26	LMP2 Pro-Am	20	High Class Racing	3:32.252		25
27	LMP2 Pro-Am	44	ARC Bratislava	3:32.446		26
**28**	LMP2	1	Richard Mille Racing Team	3:32.598		27
29	**Innovative**	**84**	**Association SRT41**	**3:33.538**		28
30	LMP2 Pro-Am	39	SO24-DIROB by Graff	3:34.005		29
31	LMP2 Pro-Am	74	Racing Team India Eurasia	3:36.012		30
32	**LMGTE Pro**	**72**	**HubAuto Racing**	**3:47.599**	**3:46.882**	31
33	LMGTE Pro	52	AF Corse	3:46.011	3:47.063	32
34	LMGTE Pro	64	Corvette Racing	3:47.074	3:47.093	33
**35**	LMGTE Pro	51	AF Corse	3:46.581	3:47.247	34
36	LMGTE Pro	91	Porsche GT Team	3:47.624	3:47.696	35
37	LMGTE Pro	92	Porsche GT Team	3:46.779	No Time	36
38	LMGTE Pro	79	WeatherTech Racing	3:47.682		37
39	LMGTE Pro	63	Corvette Racing	3:49.643		38
40	**LMGTE Am**	**88**	**Dempsey-Proton Racing**	**3:48.620**	**3:47.987**	39
41	LMGTE Am	86	GR Racing	3:49.100	3:48.560	40
42	LMGTE Am	56	Team Project 1	3:49.608	3:48.876	41
43	LMGTE Am	47	Cetilar Racing	3:49.102	3:49.387	42
44	LMGTE Am	71	Inception Racing	3:49.462	3:49.477	43
45	LMGTE Am	33	TF Sport	3:49.663	3:49.676	44
46	LMGTE Am	80	Iron Lynx	3:49.693		45
47	LMGTE Am	57	Kessel Racing	3:49.715		46
48	LMGTE Am	99	Proton Competition	3:49.788		47
49	LMGTE Am	54	AF Corse	3:49.829		48
50	LMGTE Am	83	AF Corse	3:49.881		49
51	LMGTE Am	77	Dempsey-Proton Racing	3:49.913		50
52	LMGTE Am	18	Absolute Racing	3:50.016		51
53	LMGTE Am	388	Rinaldi Racing	3:50.018		52
54	LMGTE Am	95	TF Sport	3:50.059		53
55	LMGTE Am	98	Aston Martin Racing	3:50.156		54
56	LMGTE Am	85	Iron Lynx	3:50.314		55
57	LMGTE Am	60	Iron Lynx	3:50.768		56
58	LMGTE Am	777	D'station Racing	3:51.107		57
59	LMGTE Am	46	Team Project 1	3:51.411		58
60	LMGTE Am	55	Spirit of Race	3:52.088		59
61	LMGTE Am	66	JMW Motorsport	3:52.304		60
62	LMGTE Am	69	Herberth Motorsport	3:52.960		61

== Warm-up ==
A 15-minute warm-up session for teams to check their cars took place on the morning of 21 August. Buemi lapped fastest at 3:28.529 with his teammate Conway second-quickest and Lapierre third for Alpine. United Autosports' Alex Lynn Led LMP2 with a 3:32.841-minute lap from teammate Jamin in second. Estre was fastest in LMGTE Pro from his Porsche teammate Bruni; Barnicoat put Ferrari quickest in LMGTE Am. While the session passed with no major incidents, Robin Frijns, Sean Gelael, Robert Kubica and Ricky Taylor each lost control of their LMP2 cars; all were undamaged.

== Race ==
=== Start ===
At the start, the circuit was wet from a heavy rain that fell less than an hour before the event began. The ambient temperature was between 15.1 to 22.5 °C (59.2 to 72.5 °F) and the track temperature ranged from 17 to 41 °C (63 to 106 °F). John Elkann, Ferrari's chairperson, waved the French tricolor at 16:00 local time to start the event in front of 50,000 spectators, as race control declared the running of three formation laps behind the safety car because of the wet conditions. Leaving the grid, Tommy Milner appeared to experience difficulty accelerating his No. 64 Corvette past the stalled High Class ORECA LMP2 entry that was slow to drive away from the grid after a mechanic left a movable jack on the car's rear. Because of a fogged-up front windscreen limiting visibility, Calado, in the No. 51 Ferrari, hit Milner, damaging the Corvette's diffuser.

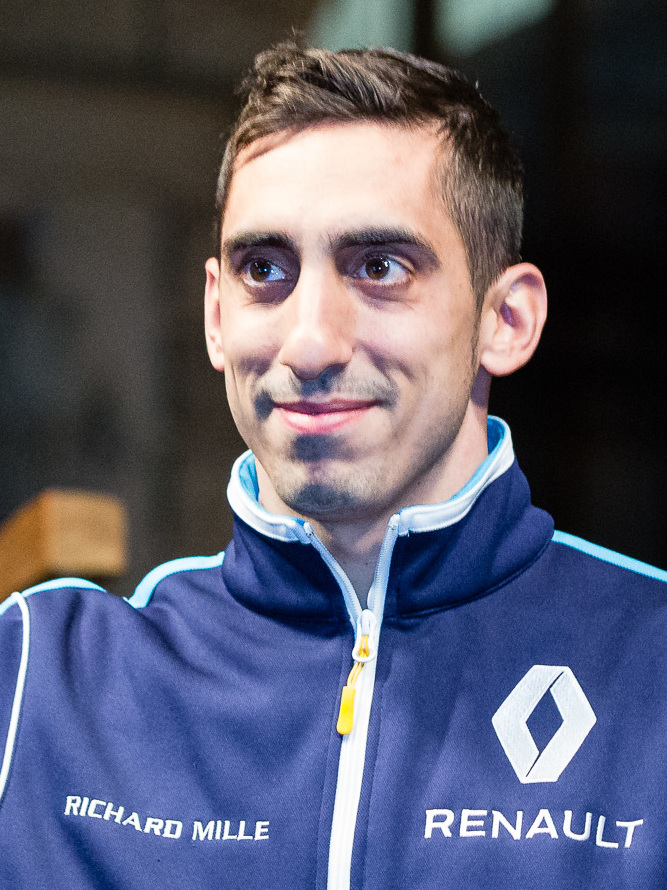
Sébastien Buemi (pictured in 2016) was involved in a collision with a Glickenhaus driven by Olivier Pla on the first lap of racing.

Green flag action commenced after 13 minutes. Pla, who locked the No. 708 Glickenhaus' brakes on the wet circuit entering turn two, hit Buemi's No. 8 Toyota on the rear-left wheel, sending him spinning onto the Dunlop Chicane run-off area, and damaging the Glickenhaus' right-front bodywork. Race control gave Pla a 10-second stop-and-go penalty, deeming him responsible for the collision. Buemi stopped on the Mulsanne Straight's side to reset the Toyota fully before driving wide onto Arnage corner's run-off area, losing more than 90 seconds to teammate Conway. Lapierre moved Alpine to second before falling to fifth by the end of the first hour, spinning without car damage at Indianapolis turn on the third racing lap and losing a minute. Félix da Costa moved Jota's LMP2 car past the non-hybrid LMH entries to be second overall as Buemi returned to third just before every team made pit stops to change from intermediate to dry tyres when the circuit began to dry after half an hour. Maxime Martin relinquished the LMGTE Pro pole-sitting HubAuto team's category lead to Milner after spinning at the Dunlop Bridge following a collision with the Racing Team India Eurasia LMP2 car, dropping Martin to eighth in class. Molina and Calado's No. 52 and 51 Ferraris shared the category lead until swift work by Corvette in the switch to dry tyres gave the LMGTE Pro lead back to Milner. Andlauer led LMGTE Am before the drying track slowed him and Fuoco overtook him for the class lead. Nielsen later passed Fuoco after the first pit stop cycle.

Buemi had returned the No. 8 Toyota to second place 71 minutes in and was within a minute of his teammate Conway. Not long after, Milner was struggling to cope with tyre wear, which was affecting the No. 64 Corvette. Molina moved the No. 52 Ferrari past him for the LMGTE Pro lead into the first Mulsanne Chicane after the two drivers were involved in a short duel. Pier Guidi's No. 51 sister Ferrari later overtook Milner for second in category before briefly taking the class lead for himself to begin the third hour. Conway had an anxious moment when he brought the No. 7 Toyota into the pit lane to replace a rear-left tyre with two slow punctures on it. He would later reclaim the overall lead from his teammate Buemi. Soon after, Buemi and Arnold Robin's No. 39 Graff car made contact driving into the Dunlop Chicane, leading Toyota to inspect the No. 8 entry for potential rim damage. Light rain began falling on portions of the circuit after 2 1/2 hours but soon stopped. Davidson became stuck deep in the gravel approaching the Dunlop Chicane, possibly because of the light rain and attempting to avoid Andrew Haryanto's spun No. 18 Absolute Racing Porsche ahead of him. He lost a lap and two minutes in LMP2 and forfeited the class lead to Colapinto's No. 26 G-Drive car.

=== Evening to night ===
Gomes in the LMGTE Am second-placed No. 98 Aston Martin put his left-hand tyres onto artificial grass, entering the right-hand Indianapolis corner and spun across the left-hand side gravel trap into the tyre barrier. He was unhurt and exited the car unassisted, but the vehicle was retired because of the damage it sustained. Race control deployed three safety cars to enable repairs to the barrier and car recovery. During the safety car period, several teams made pit stops. Blomqvist's No. 28 Jota entry took the LMP2 lead with Wayne Boyd's No. 23 United Autosports and James Allen's No. 65 Panis cars second and third in category after Colapinto and Job van Uitert's Racing Team Nederland cars stopped and were demoted to fourth and fifth, respectively. Dylan Pereira extended the No. 33 TF Aston Martin's gap to 75 seconds over the rest of the LMGTE Am field. Kobayashi's No. 7 Toyota was 73 seconds ahead of Hartley's No. 8 car when racing resumed with the first three overall cars separated by the safety cars. The LMGTE Pro lead became a battle between Jordan Taylor's No. 63 Corvette and Côme Ledogar and Sam Bird's AF Corse Ferraris as Pereira's No. 33 Aston Martin and François Perrodo's No. 83 Ferrari vied for first in LMGTE Am.

Stoffel Vandoorne and Boyd battled for the LMP2 lead; the two collided on multiple occasions before Boyd pulled away from Vandoorne in slower traffic through the Porsche Curves and Colapinto was able to challenge Vandoorne for second in class. Hartley made a pit stop in the No. 8 Toyota for a right-rear tyre replacement as a precaution because of a possible puncture and dropped farther back from the No. 7 sister car. As night fell, Bird was lapping Brendan Iribe's Inception LMGTE Am car when the two collided driving into the Ford Chicane, sending the No. 52 car spinning. Bird lost one minute and remained second in LMGTE Pro. Rain began falling again and Manuel Maldonado's No. 32 United Autosports car went straight across the inside gravel at the Dunlop Chicane and struck his teammate Di Resta's LMP2-leading No. 23 entry at the chicane atop a hill. Not long after, Colapinto lost control of the No. 26 G-Drive entry at high speed entering the Porsche Curves and hit Sophia Flörsch's No. 1 Richard Mille Racing car he was passing. As Flörsch reversed across the circuit, Tom Cloet could not react to the slow zone in time and struck the No. 1 car's side with his No. 74 Racing Team India Eurasia entry. Both drivers were unhurt. The No. 1 car was retired; Flörsch was transported to the medical centre since the vehicle's medical light had come on; tests deemed her fit. Safety cars were required for a second time because of the accidents; green flag racing resumed 21 minutes later.

In LMGTE Pro, the safety car had allowed the lead between the two AF Corse cars to grow as Nicky Catsburg briefly took the class lead in the No. 63 Corvette before Calado retook it. Jota's No. 28 entry had a 90-second stop-and-go penalty imposed on it because Blomqvist crossed the white line denoting the pit lane exit when the green light was accidentally illuminated instead of being held to rejoin when the nearest, not the next safety car passed by. The penalty promoted Stevens' No. 65 Panis car to the LMP2 lead before Delétraz's No. 41 WRT entry passed it on the Mulsanne Straight. During the seventh hour, the LMGTE Am-leading Fraga's No. 33 TF Aston Martin and Egidio Perfetti's No. 56 Project 1 Porsche crashed separately but simultaneously into the first Mulsanne Chicane tyre wall, possibly because both drivers hit debris in the area. The Porsche retired because of car damage as Fraga dropped to fourth in LMGTE Am after making a pit stop for a rear splitter replacement and a right-rear puncture replacement. The safety cars were brought out for the third time for approximately half an hour. During this safety car period, the No. 64 Corvette was driven into the garage for a rear diffuser replacement to rectify a vibration felt by driver Alexander Sims and a brake switch.

When racing resumed, Vaxivière lost control of the Alpine by locking its wheels on a damp patch in the braking zone. He beached sideways in the gravel at the first Mulsanne Chicane and required extraction. The incident promoted Derani's No. 708 Glickenhaus to third, as Vaxivière was demoted to fifth. Before the eighth hour ended, Rui Andrade lost control of the No. 25 G-Drive car at high speed and crashed backwards into the right-hand side tyre barrier through the Dunlop Bridge braking zone, leading to the entry's retirement. The safety cars were dispatched for the fourth time for car recovery; racing continued almost half an hour later. Lapierre was able to return the Alpine to third overall following a short duel with Pla's No. 708 Glickenhaus in slower traffic and lapping around two seconds quicker than Pla. Cooper MacNeil lost control of the sixth-placed LMGTE Pro WeatherTech Porsche on the Ford Chicane entry kerbs and crashed into the left-hand tyre barrier, activating the medical light. MacNeil drove the car slowly into the garage, where it was retired because of heavy right-hand side damage. At mid-point, Kobayashi led overall ahead of his teammate Hartley. Milesi and Yifei Ye's WRT cars led LMP2, and AF Corse held sway in both the LMGTE classes.

=== Morning to early afternoon ===
In the early morning, Ye's No. 41 WRT vehicle moved into the LMP2 lead after he overtook his teammate Milesi's No. 31 entry before Frijns reclaimed the class lead. Kobayashi had an anxious moment when he locked the No. 7 Toyota's tyres braking into Indianapolis corner and decided to stop the car at the turn's exit on the run-off area just before the tyre barrier. Though the tyre lockup lost him 20 seconds to his teammate Hartley, he retained the overall lead. The No. 22 United Autosports vehicle's hold on third in LMP2 was relinquished to Jota's No. 28 team when it entered the garage for alternator repairs, which lasted 90 minutes. Molina subsequently ceded the No. 52 AF Corse Ferrari's hold on third place in LMGTE Pro to Estre's No. 92 Porsche because of a front-left suspension failure requiring half an hour of significant repairs by his team. The main on-track action at this point was the battle for third in LMP2 between Sean Gelael's and later Blomqvist's No. 28 Jota and Stevens' No. 65 Panis cars.

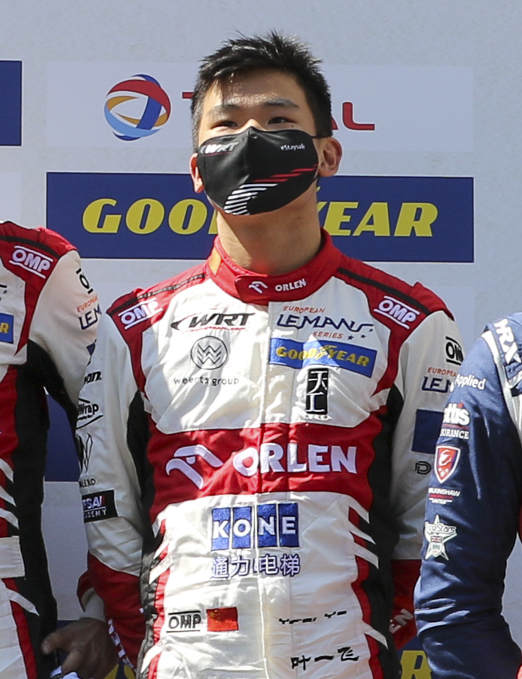
Yifei Ye began the final lap in LMP2 leading for Team WRT's No. 41 crew before a broken throttle sensor prevented him and his co-drivers from completing the final lap and achieving class victory.

With eight hours remaining, one of Toyota's electronic systems engineers noticed a problem with their two cars on the telemetry fuel pressure trace system. The fuel pump filters at the tank's bottom began clogging with mix of grease from the fuel nozzle connectors and polyurethane particles from a collapsing inner fuel bladder inside the tank's fuel cell. The bladder's inner walls rubbed against each other to produce the particles when fuel levels decreased and a small vacuum which collapsed the tank. The problem was traced to the bowsers storing fuel in the pit lane being contaminated with aluminium oxide particles. The team's stints were incrementally reduced from the normal 13 laps just before two-thirds race distance. Lead systems engineer Dominique Gardener thought of a procedure for drivers to press a button on the steering wheel while braking and accelerating in and out of corners that activated a system embedded in the vehicle's electronic system that deactivated and reactivated the fuel pumps to manage fuel consumption, and to attempt to produce pressure to clear the filter. Buemi's No. 8 Toyota fell more than three minutes behind Kobayashi's race-leading No. 7 Toyota when he stopped briefly on the straight after Mulsanne corner to reset the car by changing multiple gear settings. The No. 52 Ferrari suffered a further setback when Bird brought the car to the garage for right-front bodywork repairs, the result of a front-right puncture that left debris on the circuit.

In LMGTE Pro, both factory Porsches battled for third as Catsburg's No. 63 Corvette drew closer to Calado and Ledogar's No. 51 Ferrari for the category lead when Ledogar made a pit stop to change brakes. In the 21st hour, Pereira and Ben Keating were able to recover from TF Sport's earlier puncture by lapping faster than Perrodo's and Alessio Rovera's No. 83 Ferrari and moved the No. 33 Aston Martin back to the LMGTE Am lead. Hartley's second-placed No. 8 Toyota drove into the pit lane for less than two minutes to repair a malfunctioning right-hand side door. A mechanic did this using a laptop they plugged into the car. The stop dropped him a lap behind López, the overall race leader. A blocked air jack delayed the LMP2-leading No. 31 WRT car taken over by Frijns, causing him to make two pit stops to switch tyres and a subsequent collision with an LMGTE Am-class Porsche. The No. 31 WRT car relinquished the category lead they had held for 135 consecutive laps to Ye's No. 41 sister vehicle. WRT used giant inflatable pillows placed under the car. This allowed the team to install tyres on a single axle one end at a time, bypassing the faulty jack.

TF Sport's Keating ceded the LMGTE Am lead he had held for eight laps to Rovera's No. 83 Ferrari, as the Aston Martin had to be driven to the pit lane because of a misfiring engine. Makowiecki's fourth-placed LMGTE Pro No. 91 Porsche braked later than expected from a loss of brake pressure into the Ford Chicane and removed the car's rear diffuser and bodywork housing after driving over a grassy hill just off the racing surface. Race control instructed Makowiecki to enter the pit lane. Rear-end repairs lasted more than five minutes, but the No. 91 car retained fourth in class. Just as he began the final lap with less than three minutes remaining, Ye's LMP2-leading No. 41 WRT car stopped down the hill past the Dunlop Bridge because of a broken throttle sensor creating an electrical short circuit that temporarily turned the engine's electronic control unit off. Frijns' No. 31 sister car inherited the LMP2 lead; he held off Blomqvist's approaching No. 28 Jota entry in slower GT traffic, and avoided hitting Patrick Morriseau, the Clerk of the course, who was waving the chequered flag close to the start/finish straight's centre to win LMP2 by 0.727 seconds.

=== Finish ===
Kobayashi maintained the overall lead the No. 7 Toyota had held for 178 consecutive laps to finish first after 371 laps and achieve his, Conway and López's first Le Mans victory—Toyota's fourth in succession. They finished two laps over Buemi, Hartley and Nakajima's No. 8 sister car. The Alpine completed the overall podium in third, four laps behind the No. 7 Toyota. The two Glickenhaus entries completed the Hypercar order in fourth and fifth. WRT's LMP2 win meant they were the first debuting team to win since Starworks Motorsport in 2012. This was the fourth time the team had debuted in a major endurance event and won. Panis Racing completed the class podium in third. The No. 21 DragonSpeed team of Ben Hanley, Montoya and Henrik Hedman overcame fuel problems and a driver stint problem to win the LMP2 Pro-Am Cup. Ferrari claimed its first victory in LMGTE Pro since 2019 with the No. 51 AF Corse car ahead of the No. 63 Corvette by 41.686 seconds after leading for the final 205 laps. The Italian marque had a first-time win in LMGTE Am with the No. 83 team finishing a lap ahead of TF Sport's No. 33 Aston Martin. Pier Guidi and Ledogar's LMGTE Pro and Nielsen's LMGTE Am victories came just three weeks after their 2021 24 Hours of Spa win.

== Post-race ==
The top three teams in each class appeared on the podium to collect their trophies and spoke to the media in a later press conference. Conway said he was "crying like a little girl" and spoke of the difficulty of winning Le Mans: "We came close so many times, and to get it done here with the new hypercar as well with these boys ... [my] teammates did a stellar job as always." López commented the race's final hours were stressful because Toyota were coping with a fuel problem, and Kobayashi felt he and his co-drivers' losses at Le Mans strengthened their bond. Buemi said he felt "quite lucky" not to sustain major damage to the No. 8 car on the first lap, and that finishing second was satisfactory, adding: "Somehow to finish second after that is quite good, we had even been leading the race at some points, so it was pretty impressive." Hartley revealed Toyota were concerned his team would fail to finish and was happy to finish second. Lapierre commented that Alpine expected to finish higher and acknowledged that Toyota were the faster team. Alpine team principal Philippe Sinault said the team's third-place finish was "an excellent result" and they had no reason to be disheartened. Pascal Vasselon, Toyota's technical director, said calling both its cars into the garage would have cost them victory to Alpine.

Frijns said he felt WRT "did an amazing job by basically leading both cars into the night and come out unscratched. The cars were both working really amazing, we had really good pace...". He described the close finish in LMP2: "the two Toyotas were in front of me, and they were slowing down before the finish line for their photo. But the three, four cars behind them were all slowing down and I was still fighting for the win I was trying to find my way around them, and I saw the chequered flag guy a bit late but luckily everything went well...". WRT reported that after the No. 41 car was recovered from parc fermé by mechanics, the engine and ancillaries were determined to be unmarred. Blomqvist said he was happy with his racing and lamented losing the LMP2 victory to WRT: "It's a shame to lose. Maybe we feel like we lost the win, getting so close to it ... To lose by seven-tenths is hard. But everything went WRT's way in this race. We had a few mistakes and things that went against us."

Pier Guidi said of his second LMGTE Pro win: "It wasn't easy at all. Sometimes you gain, sometimes you lose, so we pushed really hard — the rain made it really hard for everyone. The Corvette was super quick, but we expected that." Catsburg was positive about finishing second in class and was pleased with the Corvette's performance, saying: "This is my third time at Le Mans, and the first two times we finished nowhere. To be in the fight right to the last lap was very cool. It went well." Antonio García said he would have preferred to have won, adding: "We were both alone so it was a one-on-one fight between Corvette and Ferrari. We were close." His teammate Taylor noted: "It's hard to complain with a podium at Le Mans. But when you come this close, it's difficult to take." Jani attributed Porsche's poor performance in LMGTE Pro to Estre spinning, and when his co-driver emerged in a second group of cars during a safety car deployment dividing the GTE categories before midnight. TF Sport owner Tom Ferrier concluded his team's car being slowed by a puncture and the resulting loss of time prevented them from challenging AF Corse close to the race's conclusion. Fraga spoke of his fear debris from Perfetti's accident would mean the Aston Martin would be retired.

Conway, Kobayashi and López's victory moved them atop the Hypercar Drivers' Championship with 120 points, nine ahead of their teammates Buemi, Hartley and Nakajima and 30 points over Lapierre, Negrão and Vaxivière. Calado and Pier Guidi took the GTE Drivers' Championship lead from Estre and Jani with 124 points to the latter's 112. Toyota and Ferrari left Le Mans as the respective Hypercar and GTE Manufacturers' Championship leaders, with two rounds of the season remaining.

== Official results ==
The minimum number of laps for classification at the finish (70 per cent of the overall race winner's distance) was 260 laps. Class winners are in bold.

Final race classification
Pos	Class	No.	Team	Drivers	Chassis	Tyre	Laps	Time/Reason
Pos	Class	No.	Team	Drivers	Engine	Tyre	Laps	Time/Reason
1	**Hypercar**	**7**	**(Japan) Toyota Gazoo Racing**	**(United Kingdom) Mike Conway (Japan) Kamui Kobayashi (Argentina) José María López**	**Toyota GR010 Hybrid**	M	**371**	**24:00:50.768**
1	**Hypercar**	**7**	**(Japan) Toyota Gazoo Racing**	**(United Kingdom) Mike Conway (Japan) Kamui Kobayashi (Argentina) José María López**	**Toyota 3.5 L Turbo Hybrid V6**	M	**371**	**24:00:50.768**
2	Hypercar	8	(Japan) Toyota Gazoo Racing	(Switzerland) Sébastien Buemi (New Zealand) Brendon Hartley (Japan) Kazuki Nakajima	Toyota GR010 Hybrid	M	369	+2 laps
2	Hypercar	8	(Japan) Toyota Gazoo Racing	(Switzerland) Sébastien Buemi (New Zealand) Brendon Hartley (Japan) Kazuki Nakajima	Toyota 3.5 L Turbo Hybrid V6	M	369	+2 laps
3	Hypercar	36	(France) Alpine Elf Matmut	(France) Nicolas Lapierre (Brazil) André Negrão (France) Matthieu Vaxivière	Alpine A480	M	367	+4 laps
3	Hypercar	36	(France) Alpine Elf Matmut	(France) Nicolas Lapierre (Brazil) André Negrão (France) Matthieu Vaxivière	Gibson GL458 4.5 L V8	M	367	+4 laps
4	Hypercar	708	(United States) Glickenhaus Racing	(Brazil) Pipo Derani (France) Franck Mailleux (France) Olivier Pla	Glickenhaus SCG 007 LMH	M	367	+4 laps
4	Hypercar	708	(United States) Glickenhaus Racing	(Brazil) Pipo Derani (France) Franck Mailleux (France) Olivier Pla	Glickenhaus P21 3.5 L Turbo V8	M	367	+4 laps
5	Hypercar	709	(United States) Glickenhaus Racing	(Australia) Ryan Briscoe (France) Romain Dumas (United Kingdom) Richard Westbrook	Glickenhaus SCG 007 LMH	M	364	+7 laps
5	Hypercar	709	(United States) Glickenhaus Racing	(Australia) Ryan Briscoe (France) Romain Dumas (United Kingdom) Richard Westbrook	Glickenhaus P21 3.5 L Turbo V8	M	364	+7 laps
6	**LMP2**	**31**	**(Belgium) Team WRT**	**(Netherlands) Robin Frijns (Austria) Ferdinand von Habsburg (France) Charles Milesi**	**Oreca 07**	G	**363**	**+8 laps**
6	**LMP2**	**31**	**(Belgium) Team WRT**	**(Netherlands) Robin Frijns (Austria) Ferdinand von Habsburg (France) Charles Milesi**	**Gibson GK428 4.2 L V8**	G	**363**	**+8 laps**
7	LMP2	28	(United Kingdom) Jota	(United Kingdom) Tom Blomqvist (Indonesia) Sean Gelael (Belgium) Stoffel Vandoorne	Oreca 07	G	363	+8 laps
7	LMP2	28	(United Kingdom) Jota	(United Kingdom) Tom Blomqvist (Indonesia) Sean Gelael (Belgium) Stoffel Vandoorne	Gibson GK428 4.2 L V8	G	363	+8 laps
8	LMP2	65	(France) Panis Racing	(Australia) James Allen (France) Julien Canal (United Kingdom) Will Stevens	Oreca 07	G	362	+9 laps
8	LMP2	65	(France) Panis Racing	(Australia) James Allen (France) Julien Canal (United Kingdom) Will Stevens	Gibson GK428 4.2 L V8	G	362	+9 laps
9	LMP2	23	(United Kingdom) United Autosports	(United Kingdom) Wayne Boyd (United Kingdom) Alex Lynn (United Kingdom) Paul di Resta	Oreca 07	G	361	+10 laps
9	LMP2	23	(United Kingdom) United Autosports	(United Kingdom) Wayne Boyd (United Kingdom) Alex Lynn (United Kingdom) Paul di Resta	Gibson GK428 4.2 L V8	G	361	+10 laps
10	LMP2	34	(Poland) Inter Europol Competition	(United Kingdom) Alex Brundle (Poland) Jakub Śmiechowski (Netherlands) Renger van der Zande	Oreca 07	G	360	+11 laps
10	LMP2	34	(Poland) Inter Europol Competition	(United Kingdom) Alex Brundle (Poland) Jakub Śmiechowski (Netherlands) Renger van der Zande	Gibson GK428 4.2 L V8	G	360	+11 laps
11	LMP2	48	(France) IDEC Sport	(France) Paul-Loup Chatin (France) Paul Lafargue (France) Patrick Pilet	Oreca 07	G	359	+12 laps
11	LMP2	48	(France) IDEC Sport	(France) Paul-Loup Chatin (France) Paul Lafargue (France) Patrick Pilet	Gibson GK428 4.2 L V8	G	359	+12 laps
12	LMP2	26	G-Drive Racing (Note: G-Drive Racing and Roman Rusinov are Russian, but both competed as neutral competitors using the designation RAF (Russian Automobile Federation), as the Court of Arbitration for Sport upheld a ban on Russia competing at World Championships. The ban was implemented by the World Anti-Doping Agency in response to state-sponsored doping program of Russian athletes.)	(Argentina) Franco Colapinto; Roman Rusinov (Netherlands) Nyck de Vries	Aurus 01	G	358	+13 laps
12	LMP2	26	G-Drive Racing	(Argentina) Franco Colapinto; Roman Rusinov (Netherlands) Nyck de Vries	Gibson GK428 4.2 L V8	G	358	+13 laps
13	LMP2	38	(United Kingdom) Jota	(Portugal) António Félix da Costa (United Kingdom) Anthony Davidson (Mexico) Roberto González	Oreca 07	G	358	+13 laps
13	LMP2	38	(United Kingdom) Jota	(Portugal) António Félix da Costa (United Kingdom) Anthony Davidson (Mexico) Roberto González	Gibson GK428 4.2 L V8	G	358	+13 laps
14	LMP2	30	(France) Duqueine Team	(Austria) René Binder (France) Tristan Gommendy (Mexico) Memo Rojas	Oreca 07	G	357	+14 laps
14	LMP2	30	(France) Duqueine Team	(Austria) René Binder (France) Tristan Gommendy (Mexico) Memo Rojas	Gibson GK428 4.2 L V8	G	357	+14 laps
15	LMP2 **(Pro-Am)**	21	(United States) DragonSpeed USA	(Sweden) Henrik Hedman (United Kingdom) Ben Hanley (Colombia) Juan Pablo Montoya	Oreca 07	G	356	+15 laps
15	LMP2 **(Pro-Am)**	21	(United States) DragonSpeed USA	(Sweden) Henrik Hedman (United Kingdom) Ben Hanley (Colombia) Juan Pablo Montoya	Gibson GK428 4.2 L V8	G	356	+15 laps
16	LMP2 (Pro-Am)	29	(Netherlands) Racing Team Nederland	(Netherlands) Frits van Eerd (Netherlands) Giedo van der Garde (Netherlands) Job van Uitert	Oreca 07	G	356	+15 laps
16	LMP2 (Pro-Am)	29	(Netherlands) Racing Team Nederland	(Netherlands) Frits van Eerd (Netherlands) Giedo van der Garde (Netherlands) Job van Uitert	Gibson GK428 4.2 L V8	G	356	+15 laps
17	LMP2 (Pro-Am)	70	(Switzerland) Realteam Racing	(France) Loïc Duval (Switzerland) Esteban García (France) Norman Nato	Oreca 07	G	356	+15 laps
17	LMP2 (Pro-Am)	70	(Switzerland) Realteam Racing	(France) Loïc Duval (Switzerland) Esteban García (France) Norman Nato	Gibson GK428 4.2 L V8	G	356	+15 laps
18	LMP2 (Pro-Am)	20	(Denmark) High Class Racing	(Denmark) Dennis Andersen (Denmark) Marco Sørensen (United States) Ricky Taylor	Oreca 07	G	353	+18 laps
18	LMP2 (Pro-Am)	20	(Denmark) High Class Racing	(Denmark) Dennis Andersen (Denmark) Marco Sørensen (United States) Ricky Taylor	Gibson GK428 4.2 L V8	G	353	+18 laps
19	LMP2 (Pro-Am)	39	(France) SO24-DIROB by Graff	(France) Vincent Capillaire (France) Arnold Robin (France) Maxime Robin	Oreca 07	G	352	+19 laps
19	LMP2 (Pro-Am)	39	(France) SO24-DIROB by Graff	(France) Vincent Capillaire (France) Arnold Robin (France) Maxime Robin	Gibson GK428 4.2 L V8	G	352	+19 laps
20	**GTE Pro**	**51**	**(Italy) AF Corse**	**(United Kingdom) James Calado (Italy) Alessandro Pier Guidi (France) Côme Ledogar**	**Ferrari 488 GTE Evo**	M	**345**	**+26 laps**
20	**GTE Pro**	**51**	**(Italy) AF Corse**	**(United Kingdom) James Calado (Italy) Alessandro Pier Guidi (France) Côme Ledogar**	**Ferrari F154CB 3.9 L Turbo V8**	M	**345**	**+26 laps**
21	GTE Pro	63	(United States) Corvette Racing	(Netherlands) Nicky Catsburg (Spain) Antonio García (United States) Jordan Taylor	Chevrolet Corvette C8.R	M	345	+26 laps
21	GTE Pro	63	(United States) Corvette Racing	(Netherlands) Nicky Catsburg (Spain) Antonio García (United States) Jordan Taylor	Chevrolet LT2 5.5 L V8	M	345	+26 laps
22	GTE Pro	92	(Germany) Porsche GT Team	(Denmark) Michael Christensen (France) Kévin Estre (Switzerland) Neel Jani	Porsche 911 RSR-19	M	344	+27 laps
22	GTE Pro	92	(Germany) Porsche GT Team	(Denmark) Michael Christensen (France) Kévin Estre (Switzerland) Neel Jani	Porsche 4.2 L Flat-6	M	344	+27 laps
23	GTE Pro	91	(Germany) Porsche GT Team	(Italy) Gianmaria Bruni (Austria) Richard Lietz (France) Frédéric Makowiecki	Porsche 911 RSR-19	M	343	+28 laps
23	GTE Pro	91	(Germany) Porsche GT Team	(Italy) Gianmaria Bruni (Austria) Richard Lietz (France) Frédéric Makowiecki	Porsche 4.2 L Flat-6	M	343	+28 laps
24	LMP2 (Pro-Am)	44	(Slovakia) ARC Bratislava	(Slovakia) Matej Konôpka (Slovakia) Miro Konôpka (United Kingdom) Oliver Webb	Oreca 07	G	342	+29 laps
24	LMP2 (Pro-Am)	44	(Slovakia) ARC Bratislava	(Slovakia) Matej Konôpka (Slovakia) Miro Konôpka (United Kingdom) Oliver Webb	Gibson GK428 4.2 L V8	G	342	+29 laps
25	**GTE Am**	**83**	**(Italy) AF Corse**	**(Denmark) Nicklas Nielsen (France) François Perrodo (Italy) Alessio Rovera**	**Ferrari 488 GTE Evo**	M	**340**	**+31 laps**
25	**GTE Am**	**83**	**(Italy) AF Corse**	**(Denmark) Nicklas Nielsen (France) François Perrodo (Italy) Alessio Rovera**	**Ferrari F154CB 3.9 L Turbo V8**	M	**340**	**+31 laps**
26	GTE Am	33	(United Kingdom) TF Sport	(Brazil) Felipe Fraga (United States) Ben Keating (Luxembourg) Dylan Pereira	Aston Martin Vantage AMR	M	339	+32 laps
26	GTE Am	33	(United Kingdom) TF Sport	(Brazil) Felipe Fraga (United States) Ben Keating (Luxembourg) Dylan Pereira	Aston Martin 4.0 L Turbo V8	M	339	+32 laps
27	GTE Am	80	(Italy) Iron Lynx	(Italy) Matteo Cressoni (United Kingdom) Callum Ilott (Italy) Rino Mastronardi	Ferrari 488 GTE Evo	M	338	+33 laps
27	GTE Am	80	(Italy) Iron Lynx	(Italy) Matteo Cressoni (United Kingdom) Callum Ilott (Italy) Rino Mastronardi	Ferrari F154CB 3.9 L Turbo V8	M	338	+33 laps
28	LMP2 (Pro-Am)	74	(Philippines) Racing Team India Eurasia	(Belgium) Tom Cloet (Australia) John Corbett (United Kingdom) James Winslow	Ligier JS P217	G	338	+33 laps
28	LMP2 (Pro-Am)	74	(Philippines) Racing Team India Eurasia	(Belgium) Tom Cloet (Australia) John Corbett (United Kingdom) James Winslow	Gibson GK428 4.2 L V8	G	338	+33 laps
29	LMP2	49	(Denmark) High Class Racing	(Denmark) Anders Fjordbach (Denmark) Jan Magnussen (Denmark) Kevin Magnussen	Oreca 07	G	336	+35 laps
29	LMP2	49	(Denmark) High Class Racing	(Denmark) Anders Fjordbach (Denmark) Jan Magnussen (Denmark) Kevin Magnussen	Gibson GK428 4.2 L V8	G	336	+35 laps
30	GTE Am	60	(Italy) Iron Lynx	(Italy) Raffaele Giammaria (Italy) Paolo Ruberti (Italy) Claudio Schiavoni	Ferrari 488 GTE Evo	M	335	+36 laps
30	GTE Am	60	(Italy) Iron Lynx	(Italy) Raffaele Giammaria (Italy) Paolo Ruberti (Italy) Claudio Schiavoni	Ferrari F154CB 3.9 L Turbo V8	M	335	+36 laps
31	GTE Am	77	(Germany) Dempsey-Proton Racing	(Australia) Matt Campbell (New Zealand) Jaxon Evans (Germany) Christian Ried	Porsche 911 RSR-19	M	335	+36 laps
31	GTE Am	77	(Germany) Dempsey-Proton Racing	(Australia) Matt Campbell (New Zealand) Jaxon Evans (Germany) Christian Ried	Porsche 4.2 L Flat-6	M	335	+36 laps
32	**Innovative**	**84**	**(France) Association SRT41**	**(Japan) Takuma Aoki (Belgium) Nigel Bailly (France) Matthieu Lahaye**	**Oreca 07**	G	**334**	**+37 laps**
32	**Innovative**	**84**	**(France) Association SRT41**	**(Japan) Takuma Aoki (Belgium) Nigel Bailly (France) Matthieu Lahaye**	**Gibson GK428 4.2 L V8**	G	**334**	**+37 laps**
33	GTE Am	777	(Japan) D'station Racing	(Japan) Tomonobu Fujii (Japan) Satoshi Hoshino (United Kingdom) Andrew Watson	Aston Martin Vantage AMR	M	333	+38 laps
33	GTE Am	777	(Japan) D'station Racing	(Japan) Tomonobu Fujii (Japan) Satoshi Hoshino (United Kingdom) Andrew Watson	Aston Martin 4.0 L Turbo V8	M	333	+38 laps
34	GTE Am	18	(Germany) Absolute Racing	(Indonesia) Andrew Haryanto (Belgium) Alessio Picariello (Germany) Marco Seefried	Porsche 911 RSR-19	M	332	+39 laps
34	GTE Am	18	(Germany) Absolute Racing	(Indonesia) Andrew Haryanto (Belgium) Alessio Picariello (Germany) Marco Seefried	Porsche 4.2 L Flat-6	M	332	+39 laps
35	GTE Am	95	(United Kingdom) TF Sport	(United Kingdom) Ross Gunn (United Kingdom) Ollie Hancock (United Kingdom) John Hartshorne	Aston Martin Vantage AMR	M	332	+39 laps
35	GTE Am	95	(United Kingdom) TF Sport	(United Kingdom) Ross Gunn (United Kingdom) Ollie Hancock (United Kingdom) John Hartshorne	Aston Martin 4.0 L Turbo V8	M	332	+39 laps
36	GTE Am	85	(Italy) Iron Lynx	(Belgium) Sarah Bovy (Switzerland) Rahel Frey (Denmark) Michelle Gatting	Ferrari 488 GTE Evo	M	332	+39 laps
36	GTE Am	85	(Italy) Iron Lynx	(Belgium) Sarah Bovy (Switzerland) Rahel Frey (Denmark) Michelle Gatting	Ferrari F154CB 3.9 L Turbo V8	M	332	+39 laps
37	GTE Pro	52	(Italy) AF Corse	(United Kingdom) Sam Bird (Spain) Miguel Molina (Brazil) Daniel Serra	Ferrari 488 GTE Evo	M	331	+40 laps
37	GTE Pro	52	(Italy) AF Corse	(United Kingdom) Sam Bird (Spain) Miguel Molina (Brazil) Daniel Serra	Ferrari F154CB 3.9 L Turbo V8	M	331	+40 laps
38	GTE Am	69	(Germany) Herberth Motorsport	(Germany) Ralf Bohn (Switzerland) Rolf Ineichen (Germany) Robert Renauer	Porsche 911 RSR-19	M	330	+41 laps
38	GTE Am	69	(Germany) Herberth Motorsport	(Germany) Ralf Bohn (Switzerland) Rolf Ineichen (Germany) Robert Renauer	Porsche 4.2 L Flat-6	M	330	+41 laps
39	GTE Am	54	(Italy) AF Corse	(Italy) Francesco Castellacci (Italy) Giancarlo Fisichella (Switzerland) Thomas Flohr	Ferrari 488 GTE Evo	M	329	+42 laps
39	GTE Am	54	(Italy) AF Corse	(Italy) Francesco Castellacci (Italy) Giancarlo Fisichella (Switzerland) Thomas Flohr	Ferrari F154CB 3.9 L Turbo V8	M	329	+42 laps
40	LMP2	22	(United Kingdom) United Autosports USA	(Portugal) Filipe Albuquerque (United Kingdom) Phil Hanson (Switzerland) Fabio Scherer	Oreca 07	G	328	+43 laps
40	LMP2	22	(United Kingdom) United Autosports USA	(Portugal) Filipe Albuquerque (United Kingdom) Phil Hanson (Switzerland) Fabio Scherer	Gibson GK428 4.2 L V8	G	328	+43 laps
41	GTE Am	71	(United Kingdom) Inception Racing	(United Kingdom) Ben Barnicoat (United States) Brendan Iribe (United Kingdom) Ollie Millroy	Ferrari 488 GTE Evo	M	327	+44 laps
41	GTE Am	71	(United Kingdom) Inception Racing	(United Kingdom) Ben Barnicoat (United States) Brendan Iribe (United Kingdom) Ollie Millroy	Ferrari F154CB 3.9 L Turbo V8	M	327	+44 laps
42	GTE Am	88	(Germany) Dempsey-Proton Racing	(France) Julien Andlauer (Germany) Lance David Arnold (United States) Dominique Bastien	Porsche 911 RSR-19	M	327	+44 laps
42	GTE Am	88	(Germany) Dempsey-Proton Racing	(France) Julien Andlauer (Germany) Lance David Arnold (United States) Dominique Bastien	Porsche 4.2 L Flat-6	M	327	+44 laps
43	GTE Am	86	(United Kingdom) GR Racing	(United Kingdom) Ben Barker (United Kingdom) Tom Gamble (United Kingdom) Michael Wainwright	Porsche 911 RSR-19	M	322	+49 laps
43	GTE Am	86	(United Kingdom) GR Racing	(United Kingdom) Ben Barker (United Kingdom) Tom Gamble (United Kingdom) Michael Wainwright	Porsche 4.2 L Flat-6	M	322	+49 laps
44	GTE Pro	64	(United States) Corvette Racing	(United States) Tommy Milner (United Kingdom) Alexander Sims (United Kingdom) Nick Tandy	Chevrolet Corvette C8.R	M	313	+58 laps
44	GTE Pro	64	(United States) Corvette Racing	(United States) Tommy Milner (United Kingdom) Alexander Sims (United Kingdom) Nick Tandy	Chevrolet LT2 5.5 L V8	M	313	+58 laps
NC	LMP2	41	(Belgium) Team WRT	(Switzerland) Louis Delétraz (Poland) Robert Kubica (China) Yifei Ye	Oreca 07	G	362	Incomplete final lap (Throttle sensor)
NC	LMP2	41	(Belgium) Team WRT	(Switzerland) Louis Delétraz (Poland) Robert Kubica (China) Yifei Ye	Gibson GK428 4.2 L V8	G	362	Incomplete final lap (Throttle sensor)
DNF	LMP2	82	(United States) Risi Competizione	(Republic of Ireland) Ryan Cullen (United Kingdom) Oliver Jarvis (Brazil) Felipe Nasr	Oreca 07	G	275	Engine
DNF	LMP2	82	(United States) Risi Competizione	(Republic of Ireland) Ryan Cullen (United Kingdom) Oliver Jarvis (Brazil) Felipe Nasr	Gibson GK428 4.2 L V8	G	275	Engine
DNF	GTE Am	388	(Germany) Rinaldi Racing	(Netherlands) Jeroen Bleekemolen (Germany) Pierre Ehret (Germany) Christian Hook	Ferrari 488 GTE Evo	M	271	Retired
DNF	GTE Am	388	(Germany) Rinaldi Racing	(Netherlands) Jeroen Bleekemolen (Germany) Pierre Ehret (Germany) Christian Hook	Ferrari F154CB 3.9 L Turbo V8	M	271	Retired
DNF	LMP2 (Pro-Am)	24	(United States) PR1 Motorsports Mathiasen	(France) Gabriel Aubry (United States) Patrick Kelly (Switzerland) Simon Trummer	Oreca 07	G	261	Retired
DNF	LMP2 (Pro-Am)	24	(United States) PR1 Motorsports Mathiasen	(France) Gabriel Aubry (United States) Patrick Kelly (Switzerland) Simon Trummer	Gibson GK428 4. 2L V8	G	261	Retired
DNF	GTE Pro	72	(Chinese Taipei) HubAuto Racing (Note: HubAuto Racing team owner Morris Chen was asked by race organisers that the outfit use the Chinese Taipei Olympic flag and not the Taiwanese flag for unknown reasons before the race began.)	(Belgium) Maxime Martin (Portugal) Álvaro Parente (Belgium) Dries Vanthoor	Porsche 911 RSR-19	M	227	Retired
DNF	GTE Pro	72	(Chinese Taipei) HubAuto Racing	(Belgium) Maxime Martin (Portugal) Álvaro Parente (Belgium) Dries Vanthoor	Porsche 4.2 L Flat-6	M	227	Retired
DNF	GTE Pro	79	(United States) WeatherTech Racing	(New Zealand) Earl Bamber (United States) Cooper MacNeil (Belgium) Laurens Vanthoor	Porsche 911 RSR-19	M	139	Crash damage
DNF	GTE Pro	79	(United States) WeatherTech Racing	(New Zealand) Earl Bamber (United States) Cooper MacNeil (Belgium) Laurens Vanthoor	Porsche 4.2 L Flat-6	M	139	Crash damage
DNF	GTE Am	46	(Germany) Team Project 1	(Norway) Anders Buchardt (United States) Robby Foley (Norway) Dennis Olsen	Porsche 911 RSR-19	M	138	Suspension damage
DNF	GTE Am	46	(Germany) Team Project 1	(Norway) Anders Buchardt (United States) Robby Foley (Norway) Dennis Olsen	Porsche 4.2 L Flat-6	M	138	Suspension damage
DNF	GTE Am	57	(Switzerland) Kessel Racing	(Australia) Scott Andrews (Denmark) Mikkel Jensen (Japan) Takeshi Kimura	Ferrari 488 GTE Evo	M	128	Retired
DNF	GTE Am	57	(Switzerland) Kessel Racing	(Australia) Scott Andrews (Denmark) Mikkel Jensen (Japan) Takeshi Kimura	Ferrari F154CB 3.9 L Turbo V8	M	128	Retired
DNF	GTE Am	66	(United Kingdom) JMW Motorsport	(United Kingdom) Jody Fannin (France) Thomas Neubauer (United States) Rodrigo Sales	Ferrari 488 GTE Evo	M	117	Retired
DNF	GTE Am	66	(United Kingdom) JMW Motorsport	(United Kingdom) Jody Fannin (France) Thomas Neubauer (United States) Rodrigo Sales	Ferrari F154CB 3.9 L Turbo V8	M	117	Retired
DNF	GTE Am	55	(Switzerland) Spirit of Race	(United Kingdom) Duncan Cameron (Republic of Ireland) Matt Griffin (South Africa) David Perel	Ferrari 488 GTE Evo	M	109	Crash
DNF	GTE Am	55	(Switzerland) Spirit of Race	(United Kingdom) Duncan Cameron (Republic of Ireland) Matt Griffin (South Africa) David Perel	Ferrari F154CB 3.9 L Turbo V8	M	109	Crash
DNF	LMP2 (Pro-Am)	25	G-Drive Racing	(Portugal) Rui Andrade (United States) John Falb (Spain) Roberto Merhi	Aurus 01	G	108	Accident
DNF	LMP2 (Pro-Am)	25	G-Drive Racing	(Portugal) Rui Andrade (United States) John Falb (Spain) Roberto Merhi	Gibson GK428 4.2 L V8	G	108	Accident
DNF	GTE Am	47	(Italy) Cetilar Racing	(Italy) Antonio Fuoco (Italy) Roberto Lacorte (Italy) Giorgio Sernagiotto	Ferrari 488 GTE Evo	M	90	Accident
DNF	GTE Am	47	(Italy) Cetilar Racing	(Italy) Antonio Fuoco (Italy) Roberto Lacorte (Italy) Giorgio Sernagiotto	Ferrari F154CB 3.9 L Turbo V8	M	90	Accident
DNF	GTE Am	56	(Germany) Team Project 1	(Italy) Matteo Cairoli (Italy) Riccardo Pera (Norway) Egidio Perfetti	Porsche 911 RSR-19	M	84	Crash
DNF	GTE Am	56	(Germany) Team Project 1	(Italy) Matteo Cairoli (Italy) Riccardo Pera (Norway) Egidio Perfetti	Porsche 4.2 L Flat-6	M	84	Crash
DNF	LMP2	32	(United Kingdom) United Autosports	(South Africa) Jonathan Aberdein (France) Nico Jamin (Venezuela) Manuel Maldonado	Oreca 07	G	75	Collision
DNF	LMP2	32	(United Kingdom) United Autosports	(South Africa) Jonathan Aberdein (France) Nico Jamin (Venezuela) Manuel Maldonado	Gibson GK428 4.2 L V8	G	75	Collision
DNF	LMP2	1	(France) Richard Mille Racing Team	(Colombia) Tatiana Calderón (Germany) Sophia Flörsch (Netherlands) Beitske Visser	Oreca 07	G	74	Collision
DNF	LMP2	1	(France) Richard Mille Racing Team	(Colombia) Tatiana Calderón (Germany) Sophia Flörsch (Netherlands) Beitske Visser	Gibson GK428 4.2 L V8	G	74	Collision
DNF	GTE Am	99	(Germany) Proton Competition	(Thailand) Vutthikorn Inthraphuvasak (France) Florian Latorre (United Kingdom) Harry Tincknell	Porsche 911 RSR-19	M	66	Retired
DNF	GTE Am	99	(Germany) Proton Competition	(Thailand) Vutthikorn Inthraphuvasak (France) Florian Latorre (United Kingdom) Harry Tincknell	Porsche 4.2 L Flat-6	M	66	Retired
DNF	GTE Am	98	(United Kingdom) Aston Martin Racing	(Brazil) Marcos Gomes (Canada) Paul Dalla Lana (Denmark) Nicki Thiim	Aston Martin Vantage AMR	M	45	Accident
DNF	GTE Am	98	(United Kingdom) Aston Martin Racing	(Brazil) Marcos Gomes (Canada) Paul Dalla Lana (Denmark) Nicki Thiim	Aston Martin 4.0 L Turbo V8	M	45	Accident
WD	LMP2 (Pro-Am)	17	(France) IDEC Sport	(United Kingdom) Ryan Dalziel (France) Thomas Laurent (United States) Dwight Merriman	Oreca 07	G	0	Withdrew
WD	LMP2 (Pro-Am)	17	(France) IDEC Sport	(United Kingdom) Ryan Dalziel (France) Thomas Laurent (United States) Dwight Merriman	Gibson GK428 4.2 L V8	G	0	Withdrew

Tyre manufacturers
Key
Symbol	Tyre manufacturer
**G**	Goodyear
**M**	Michelin

== Championship standings after the race ==
2021 Hypercar World Endurance Drivers' Championship
Pos.	+/–	Driver	Points
1	1	(United Kingdom) Mike Conway (Japan) Kamui Kobayashi (Argentina) José María López	120
2	1	(Switzerland) Sébastien Buemi (New Zealand) Brendon Hartley (Japan) Kazuki Nakajima	111
3		(France) Nicolas Lapierre (Brazil) André Negrão (France) Matthieu Vaxivière	90
4		(France) Romain Dumas (United Kingdom) Richard Westbrook	53
5	1	(France) Franck Mailleux	39

2021 Hypercar World Endurance Championship
Pos.	+/–	Team	Points
1		(Japan) Toyota Gazoo Racing	141
2		(France) Alpine Elf Matmut	90
3		(United States) Glickenhaus Racing	37

- Note: Only the top five positions are included for Drivers' Championship standings.

2021 World Endurance GTE Drivers' Championship
Pos.	+/–	Driver	Points
1	1	(United Kingdom) James Calado (Italy) Alessandro Pier Guidi	124
2	1	(France) Kévin Estre (Switzerland) Neel Jani	112
3	1	(Italy) Gianmaria Bruni (Austria) Richard Lietz	75
4	1	(Denmark) Michael Christensen	60
5	2	(Spain) Miguel Molina (Brazil) Daniel Serra	57

2021 World Endurance GTE Manufacturers' Championship
Pos.	+/–	Constructor	Points
1		(Italy) Ferrari	203
2		(Germany) Porsche	187

- Note: Only the top five positions are included for the Drivers' Championship standings.

== See also ==
- 2021 Road to Le Mans
