= Adam Beechey =

Australian racing driver

- Nationality: Australian
- Born: 1981 (age 44–45) Tasmania

Commodore Cup
- Years active: 2009-12
- Starts: 18
- Wins: 10
- Poles: 4
- Best finish: 1st in 2010, 2011, 2012

Previous series
- 2004-06 2005: Australian Production Car Championship; Australian Performance Car Championship

Adam Beechey (born 1981 in Tasmania) is an Australian racing driver.

Beechey's career began in the 1990s, and since then he has competed in a wide range of series and vehicles in Australia, from the Tasmanian Super Sedan Series to the Commodore Cup National Series.

After winning the championship in 2010, 2011 and 2012, Beechey became one of only two drivers to win the Commodore Cup title three times in a row, with the other being five-time champion Geoff Emery. Beechey was also the last driver to win the series after the category folded at the end of 2012. Beechey is also a three-time winner of the Ashley Cooper Memorial Trophy.

== Career results ==
Year	Series	Position	Car	Entrant
2004	Australian Production Car Championship - Class B	4th	Honda Integra Type-R	Greg Crick Honda
2005	Australian Performance Car Championship	27th	Nissan 200SX GT	Donut King
2004	Australian Production Car Trophy	1st	Honda Integra Type-R	Greg Crick Honda
2008	Holden HQ - Nationals	2nd	Holden HQ	Donut King
2009	Commodore Cup	42nd	Holden VS Commodore	Top Shelf Fruits
2010	Commodore Cup	1st	Holden VS Commodore	Donut King
2011	Commodore Cup	1st	Holden VS Commodore	Donut King
2012	Commodore Cup	1st	Holden VS Commodore	Donut King
