= Michael Fitzgerald (racing driver) =

American former race car driver

- Born: 1961 (age 64–65); Havertown, Pennsylvania, U.S.
- Education: Drexel University
- Occupations: Businessman; Race car driver
- Spouse: Joanne Fitzgerald

Michael Fitzgerald (born 1961) is an American businessman and former professional race car driver. He is the founder and chief executive officer (CEO) of Acero Precision.

As a race car driver, he participated in Historic Formula One Series between 2004 and 2012 and won races in Belgium, England, and Montreal.

== Early life and education ==
Fitzgerald was born in 1961 in Havertown, Pennsylvania. His interest in motorsport dates to age 10, when he watched Grand Prix (1966). He studied mechanical engineering at Drexel University. During his time as an engineering student, he used to work on computer numeric control machine and was developed interest in autoracing.

== Career ==
=== Business ===
While still a Drexel undergraduate in the early 1980s, Fitzgerald purchased a small machine shop, which he initially intended to use as a workspace for preparing race cars. The shop grew into Acero Precision, which Fitzgerald has led since its founding in 1985. Based in West Chester, Pennsylvania, the company manufactures components for orthopedic and spinal implants, analytical laboratory equipment, oil and gas exploration tools, and motorsport teams, including parts supplied to Team Penske and several Formula One teams. Fitzgerald's wife, Joanne Fitzgerald, serves as the company's director of human capital.

=== Motorsport ===
Fitzgerald competed as a driver at a semi-professional level from 1994 to 1997 before retiring from full-contact racing after sustaining a back injury in a crash in Phoenix.

In 2001, Fitzgerald won the Historic Grand Prix du Canada. In 2008, he participated in the Historic Grand Prix of Monaco and attained third place. His team, Highcroft Racing won American Le Mans Series championship in 2009 and 2010. Three years later, in 2011, he won the Grand Prix du Canada with Williams FW08.
