= 2016 British LMP3 Cup =

Seasons
- ← none 2017 →

The 2016 Prototype Cup (later renamed the LMP3 Cup Championship) was the inaugural event for the British LMP3 Cup. The series debuted at Snetterton Circuit on 8/9 October 2016, with a single race to launch the championship, which was won by Tockwith Motorsport's Philip Hanson and Nigel Moore.

== Report ==
=== Qualifying ===
Philip Hanson and Nigel Moore set the early pace in qualifying, setting a quick lap around three seconds ahead of the rest of the field. Christian England and Colin Noble followed up for Team West-Tec, 0.8s behind, with Shaun Lynn third for United Autosports.

=== Race ===
After a brief delay to allow light rain to clear the circuit, Philip Hanson led from pole, from Christian England, who switched to the sister Team West-Tec car after problems with the one he and Noble qualified. The lead two cars would remain unchallenged through the race, even after the pit stops, with Jay Palmer and Wayne Boyd's United Autosports Ligier JS P3 coming home in third.

== Qualifying ==
| Pos | Team | Drivers | Chassis | Engine | Time |
|---|---|---|---|---|---|
| 1 | (United Kingdom) Tockwith Motorsport | (United Kingdom) Phil Hanson (United Kingdom) Nigel Moore | Ligier JS P3 | Nissan VK50VE | 1:45.659 |
| 2 | (United Kingdom) Team West-Tec | (United Kingdom) Colin Noble (United Kingdom) Christian England | Ligier JS P3 | Nissan VK50VE | 1:46.529 |
| 3 | (United States) United Autosports | (United Kingdom) Shaun Lynn | Ligier JS P3 | Nissan VK50VE | 1:47.888 |
| 4 | (United States) United Autosports | (Belgium) Jacques Duyver (United Kingdom) Charlie Hollings | Ligier JS P3 | Nissan VK50VE | 1:48.182 |
| 5 | (United States) United Autosports | (United Kingdom) Wayne Boyd (United Kingdom) Jay Palmer | Ligier JS P3 | Nissan VK50VE | 1:48.505 |
| 6 | (United Kingdom) Team West-Tec | (United Kingdom) Shaun Balfe (United Kingdom) Bradley Smith | Ligier JS P3 | Nissan VK50VE | 1:49.376 |
| 7 | (United States) United Autosports | (United States) Guy Cosmo (United States) Patrick Byrne | Ligier JS P3 | Nissan VK50VE | 1:50.101 |
| 8 | (United Kingdom) Douglas Motorsport | (Australia) Thomas Randle (United Kingdom) Mike Newbould | Ligier JS P3 | Nissan VK50VE | 1:51.636 |

== Race ==
| Pos | Team | Drivers | Chassis | Engine | Time |
|---|---|---|---|---|---|
| 1 | (United Kingdom) Tockwith Motorsport | (United Kingdom) Phil Hanson (United Kingdom) Nigel Moore | Ligier JS P3 | Nissan VK50VE | 31 laps |
| 2 | (United Kingdom) Team West-Tec | (United Kingdom) Bradley Smith (United Kingdom) Christian England | Ligier JS P3 | Nissan VK50VE | +22.293 |
| 3 | (United States) United Autosports | (United Kingdom) Wayne Boyd (United Kingdom) Jay Palmer | Ligier JS P3 | Nissan VK50VE | +44.051 |
| 4 | (United States) United Autosports | (Belgium) Jacques Duyver (United Kingdom) Charlie Hollings | Ligier JS P3 | Nissan VK50VE | +1:20.532 |
| 5 | (United States) United Autosports | (United States) Guy Cosmo (United States) Patrick Byrne | Ligier JS P3 | Nissan VK50VE | +1:40.907 |
| 6 | (United Kingdom) Douglas Motorsport | (Australia) Thomas Randle (United Kingdom) Mike Newbould | Ligier JS P3 | Nissan VK50VE | +1:41.146 |
| 7 | (United States) United Autosports | (United Kingdom) Shaun Lynn | Ligier JS P3 | Nissan VK50VE | +1 Lap |
