= Sandy Mitchell (racing driver) =

British racing driver

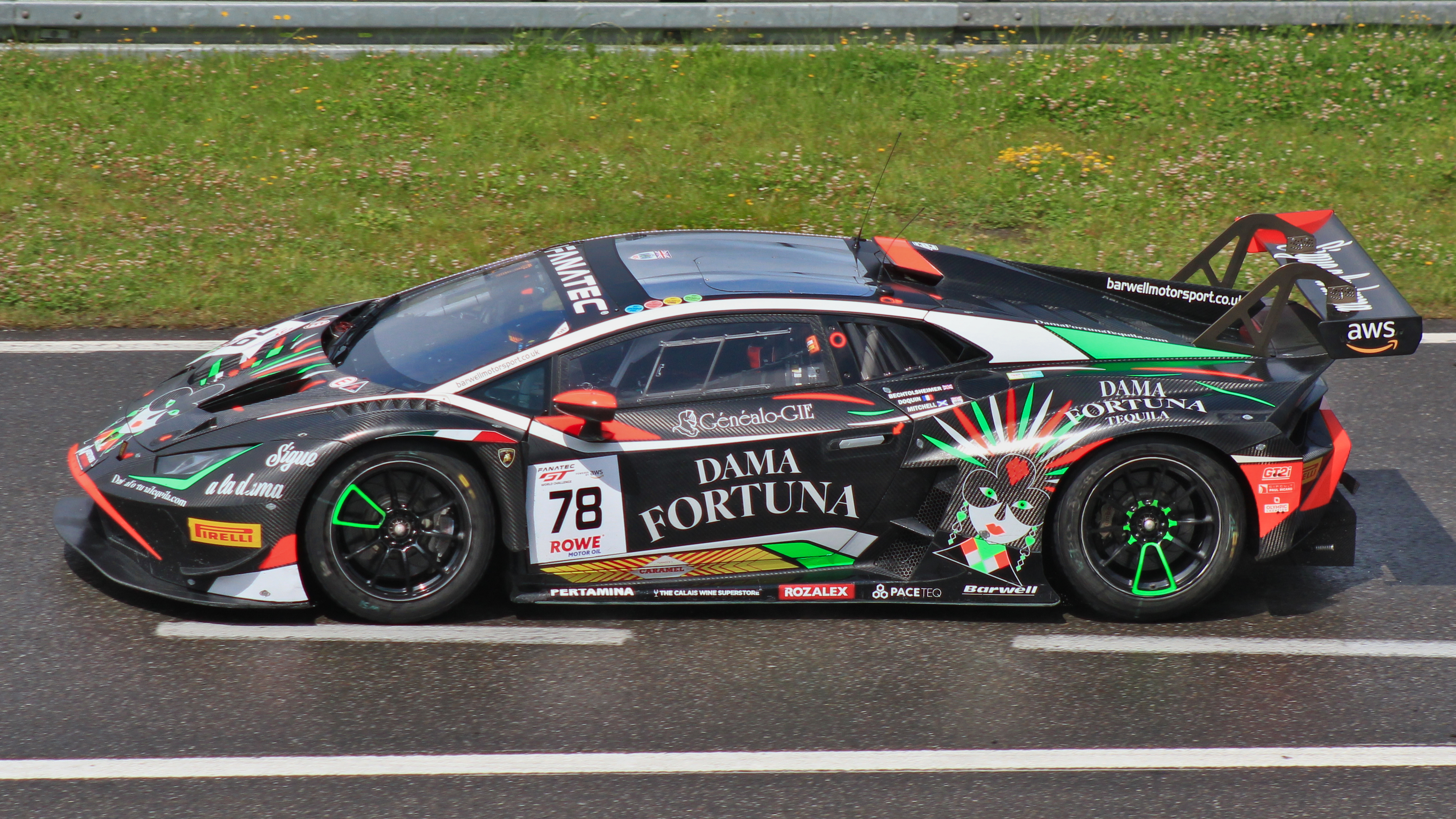
- Nationality: (United Kingdom) British
- Born: 7 March 2000 (age 26) Forfar, Scotland

British GT Championship career
- Debut season: 2016
- Current team: Barwell Motorsport
- Categorisation: FIA Silver (until 2020); FIA Gold (2021–2023); FIA Platinum (2024–)
- Car number: 1
- Former teams: Black Bull Ecurie Ecosse; Black Bull Garage 59
- Starts: 45
- Wins: 7
- Podiums: 15
- Poles: 6
- Fastest laps: 4

Previous series
- 2019 2017 2015: Lamborghini Super Trofeo North America; British LMP3 Cup; MSA Formula

Championship titles
- 2020: British GT Championship – GT3

Sandy Mitchell (born 7 March 2000) is a British racing driver from Scotland who currently competes in the IMSA SportsCar Championship for Pfaff Motorsports. He is a Lamborghini factory driver since 2021.

== Career ==
Mitchell's racing career began at the age of four, as he took the wheel of an off-road buggy his father bought for him. His off-road interests were spurred by his racing hero at the time, Scottish rally driver Colin McRae. Mitchell began his karting career in 2009, winning the NSKC Honda Cadet Championship in his first year of competition. After claiming the Super 1 National Rotax Max Junior championship in 2014, Mitchell stepped up to single-seater competition in the new-for-2015 MSA Formula Championship. He claimed his maiden victory at Thruxton in May en route to a seventh place finish in the championship.

In 2016, Mitchell transitioned into sports car racing, joining Ecurie Ecosse in the GT4 class of the British GT Championship. Claiming two class victories at Snetterton and Donington Park, Mitchell and co-driver Ciaran Haggerty finished third in the GT4 championship. After a 2017 season which saw him compete in the British GT Championship and British LMP3 Cup, Mitchell joined Barwell Motorsport for the 2018 Blancpain GT Series Endurance Cup season. 2019 saw Mitchell reprise his role in the Barwell Motorsport entry, alongside adding a full-season drive with Prestige Performance in the Lamborghini Super Trofeo North America. It would prove to be a fruitful year for Mitchell, as he would finish third in the Super Trofeo championship, second at the Super Trofeo World Final, and win the Silver Class at the 24 Hours of Spa.

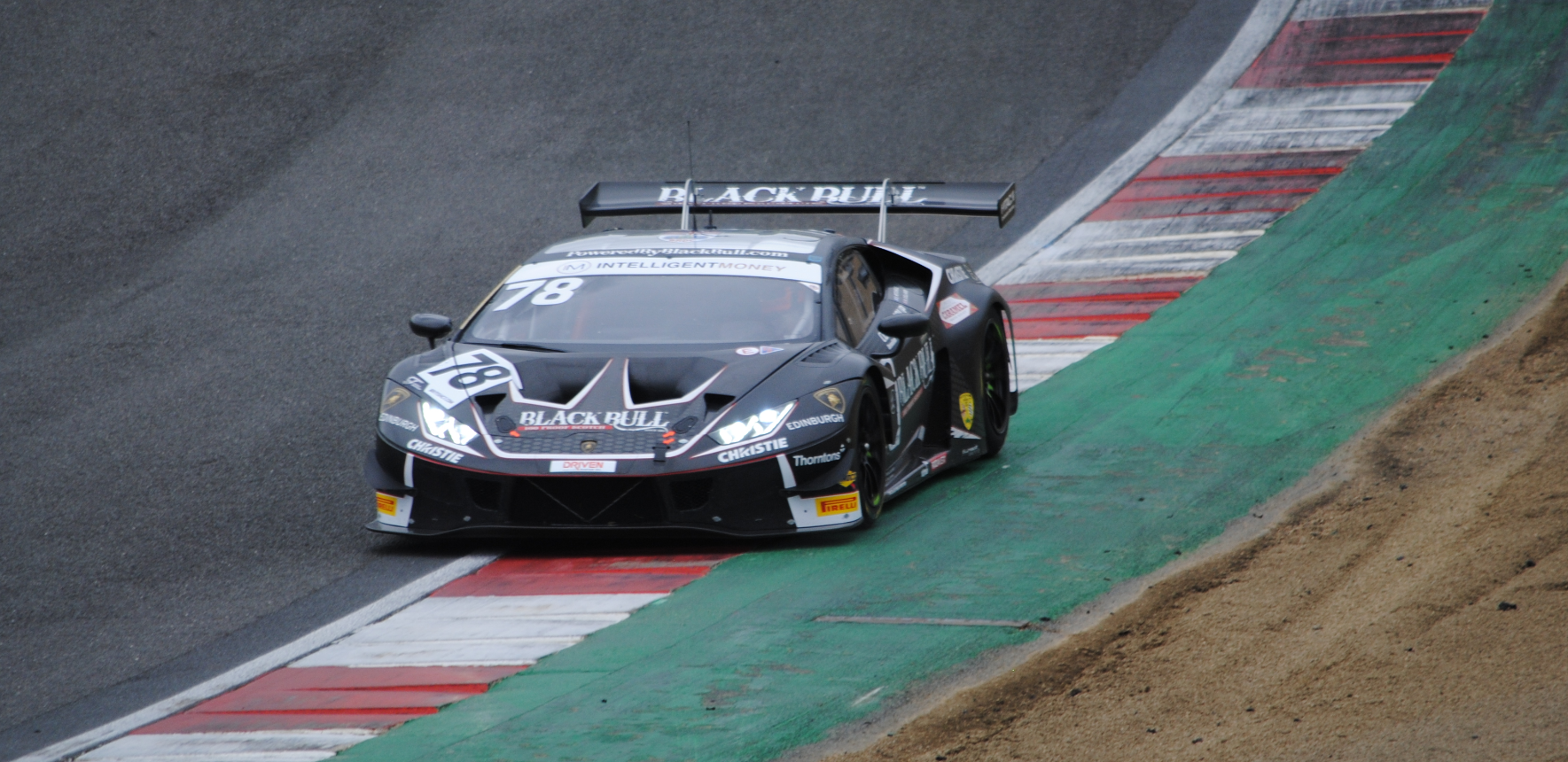
Mitchell competing for Barwell Motorsport in 2020.

In early 2020, Mitchell was inducted into the BRDC superstars program. That year, Mitchell and co-driver Rob Collard claimed overall honors in the British GT Championship; the first championship victory of Mitchell's professional career. In October, Mitchell defended his Silver Class crown at the 24 Hours of Spa, taking victory for Barwell Motorsport for the second consecutive year.

Prior to the 2021 season, Mitchell was signed as a Lamborghini factory driver, joining Giacomo Altoè as one of the youngest drivers in the Italian marque's factory stable. Mitchell also returned to defend his British GT Championship class title in 2021. After finishing third in the championship that season, Mitchell returned to Barwell for 2022 alongside co-driver Adam Balon. The duo claimed their sole victory of the season at Silverstone, finishing second in the championship to Ram Racing's Ian Loggie.

For 2023, Mitchell would team up with a new co-driver, driving alongside Shaun Balfe. Mitchell would supplement his British GT program with a full-time drive in the GT World Challenge Europe Endurance Cup, competing in the Pro class for K-Pax Racing alongside Marco Mapelli and Franck Perera. The team endured a quiet season in GT World Challenge competition, finishing a season-high ninth at the Nürburgring to score their only points of the season. In British GT, Mitchell and Balfe claimed two race victories, at Snetterton and Donington, en route to a fourth-place championship finish.

== Karting record ==
=== Karting career summary ===
Season	Series	Team	Position
2011	Kartmasters British GP - Honda Cadet		4th
2012	Kartmasters British GP - Honda Cadet		3rd
2012	Super One Series - Honda Cadet		2nd
2013	Kartmasters British GP - Mini Max		31st
2013	Super One Series - Mini Max		7th
2013	Trent Valley Kart Club - Minimax	R L Racing Dept.	53rd
2014	Super One Series - Rotax Junior		1st
2014	Rotax Max Challenge Grand Finals - Junior Max	RL Racing Department	25th

== Racing record ==
=== Racing career summary ===
Season	Series	Team	Races	Wins	Poles	F/Laps	Podiums	Points	Position
2015	MSA Formula Championship	TRS Arden Junior Racing Team	30	2	2	2	5	193	7th
2016	British GT Championship - GT4	Black Bull Ecurie Ecosse	9	2	2	2	2	115.5	**3rd**
2017	British GT Championship - GT4	Black Bull Garage 59	9	1	1	2	3	100	6th
2017	British LMP3 Cup	United Autosports	2	0	0	0	1	28	9th
2018	Blancpain GT Series Endurance Cup - Silver Cup	Barwell Motorsport	5	1	0	0	3	92	**3rd**
2018	24H TCE Series - TCR	Excelr8 Motorsport	1	0	0	0	0	?	?
2019	Lamborghini Super Trofeo World Final - Pro	Prestige Performance / WTR	2	1	1	0	2	28	**2nd**
2019	Lamborghini Super Trofeo North America - Pro	Prestige Performance / WTR	12	3	3	3	9	112	**3rd**
2019	Blancpain GT Series Endurance Cup - Silver Cup	Barwell Motorsport	5	1	0	1	1	61	4th
2020	British GT Championship - GT3	Barwell Motorsport	9	2	1	0	4	168	**1st**
2020	GT World Challenge Europe Endurance Cup - Pro-Am Cup	Barwell Motorsport	4	1	0	1	2	76	3rd
2020	Intercontinental GT Challenge	Barwell Motorsport	1	0	0	0	0	0	NC
2021	British GT Championship - GT3	Barwell Motorsport	9	0	0	1	3	142.5	**3rd**
2021	GT World Challenge Europe Endurance Cup - Pro-Am Cup	Barwell Motorsport	1	0	0	0	1	33	13th
2021	Intercontinental GT Challenge	Barwell Motorsport	1	0	0	0	0	0	NC
2021	GT World Challenge America - Pro-Am	TR3 Racing	2	0	0	1	0	4	19th
2022	British GT Championship - GT3	Barwell Motorsport	9	1	2	0	3	128.5	**2nd**
2022	GT World Challenge Europe Endurance Cup - Gold Cup	Barwell Motorsport	3	0	1	0	1	20	15th
2022	IMSA SportsCar Championship - GTD	CarBahn with Peregrine Racing	1	0	0	0	0	163	65th
2023	British GT Championship - GT3	Barwell Motorsport	9	2	2	1	4	144	4th
2023	GT World Challenge Europe Endurance Cup	K-PAX Racing	5	0	0	0	0	2	26th
2024	British GT Championship - GT3	Dextra – Barwell Motorsport	9	4	3	0	5	177	**2nd**
2024	GT World Challenge Europe Endurance Cup - Bronze Cup	Barwell Motorsport	5	0	0	1	1	24	16th
2024	GT World Challenge Europe Sprint Cup - Bronze Cup	Barwell Motorsport	8	1	0	1	5	67.5	2nd
2024	IMSA SportsCar Championship - GTD	Forte Racing	1	0	0	0	0	316	48th
2024	IMSA SportsCar Championship - GTD	Wayne Taylor Racing with Andretti	1	0	0	0	0	316	48th
2025	British GT Championship - GT3	Barwell Motorsport	6	1	0	0	4	107.5	8th
2025	GT World Challenge Europe Sprint Cup	Barwell Motorsport	10	0	0	0	0	6.5	20th
2025	GT World Challenge Europe Endurance Cup	VSR	5	0	0	0	0	9	18th
2025	Italian GT Championship Sprint Cup - GT3	VSR	4	1	1	1	2	0	NC†
2025	IMSA SportsCar Championship - GTD Pro	Pfaff Motorsports	1	0	1	1	0	255	335h
2026	IMSA SportsCar Championship - GTD Pro	Pfaff Motorsports	10	2	1	1	4	2979	**2nd**
2026	Nürburgring Langstrecken-Serie - VT2-RWD	Manheller Racing							
2026	GT World Challenge Europe Endurance Cup	TGI Team by GRT	1	0	0	0	0	0	NC
2026	Italian GT Championship Sprint Cup - GT3	Villorba Corse	2	0	0	0	0	0	NC†

^{*} Season still in progress. † Guest driver; ineligible for championship points

=== MSA Formula Championship results ===
(key) (Races in bold indicate pole position – 1 point awarded in first race; races in italics indicate fastest lap – 1 point awarded all races; * signifies that driver lead race for at least one lap – 1 point awarded all races)

Year	Team	1	2	3	4	5	6	7	8	9	10	11	12	13	14	15	16	17	18	19	20	21	22	23	24	25	26	27	28	29	30	Pos	Points
2015	TRS Arden Junior Racing Team	BHI; 1; 14	BHI; 2; 6	BHI; 3; 12	DON; 1; 13	DON; 2 Ret	DON; 3 Ret	**THR**; **1**; 1	THR; 2; 2	**THR**; **3**; 1	OUL; 1; 13	OUL; 2; 11	OUL; 3; 12	CRO; 1; 8	CRO; 2; 7	CRO; 3; 7	SNE; 1; 15	SNE; 2 Ret	SNE; 3; 20	KNO; 1; 4	KNO; 2; 4	KNO; 3; 5	ROC; 1; 9	ROC; 2; 3	ROC; 3; 15	SIL; 1; 8	SIL; 2; 9	SIL; 3 Ret	BHGP; 1; 6	BHGP; 2; 2	BHGP; 3; 9	7th	193

=== Complete British GT Championship results ===
(key) (Races in bold indicate pole position) (Races in italics indicate fastest lap)

Year	Team	Car	Class	1	2	3	4	5	6	7	8	9	10	Pos	Points
2016	Black Bull Ecurie Ecosse	McLaren 570S GT4	GT4	BRH; 1; 15	ROC; 1; 16	OUL; 1; 23	OUL; 2; 16	SIL; 1; 29	SPA; 1 Ret	SNE; 1; 12	SNE; 2; 11	DON; 1; 9		3rd	115.5
2017	Black Bull Garage 59	McLaren 570S GT4	GT4	OUL; 1; 25	OUL; 2; 14	ROC; 1; 12	SNE; 1; 13	SNE; 2; 10	SIL; 1; 20	SPA; 1 DSQ	SPA; 2 DNS	BRH; 1; 17	DON; 1; 14	6th	100
2020	Barwell Motorsport	Lamborghini Huracán GT3 Evo	GT3	OUL; 1; 4	OUL; 2; 2	DON; 1; 5	DON; 2; 6	BRH; 1; 1	DON; 1; 5	SNE; 1; 2	SNE; 2; 5	SIL; 1; 1		1st	168
2021	Barwell Motorsport	Lamborghini Huracán GT3 Evo	GT3	BRH; 1; 12	SIL; 1; 2	DON; 1; 5	SPA; 2; 5	SNE; 1; 5	SNE; 2; 2	OUL; 1; 5	OUL; 2; 2	DON; 1; 5		3rd	142.5
2022	Barwell Motorsport	Lamborghini Huracán GT3 Evo	GT3	OUL; 1; 9	OUL; 2; 12	**SIL**; **1**	DON; 1; 15	SNE; 1; 6	SNE; 2; 2	**SPA**; **4**	BRH; 2	DON; 5		2nd	128.5
2023	Barwell Motorsport	Lamborghini Huracán GT3 Evo 2	GT3	OUL; 1; 12	OUL; 2; 7	SIL; 1; 2	**DON**; **1**; 7	**SNE**; **1**; 1	SNE; 2; 9	ALG; 1; 3	BRH; 1; 5	DON; 1; 1		4th	144
2024	Barwell Motorsport	Lamborghini Huracán GT3 Evo 2	GT3	OUL; 1; 3	**OUL**; **2**; 1	SIL; 1 Ret	**DON**; **1**; 1	SPA; 1; 4	SNE; 1; 1	**SNE**; **2**; 10	DON; 1; 4	BRH; 1; 2		2nd	177
2025	Barwell Motorsport	Lamborghini Huracán GT3 Evo 2	GT3	DON; 1; 2	SIL; 1	OUL; 1; 5	OUL; 2; 12	SPA; 1	SNE; 1; 3	SNE; 2; 2	BRH; 1	DON; 1; 1		8th	107.5

^{*} Season still in progress.

=== Complete GT World Challenge Europe results ===
==== GT World Challenge Europe Endurance Cup ====
Year	Team	Car	Class	1	2	3	4	5	6	7	Pos.	Points
2018	Barwell Motorsport	Lamborghini Huracán GT3	Silver	MNZ; Ret	SIL; 40	LEC; 14	SPA; 6H; 26	SPA; 12H; 24	SPA; 24H; 19	CAT; 18	3rd	92
2019	Barwell Motorsport	Lamborghini Huracán GT3 Evo	Silver	MNZ; 26	SIL; 15	LEC; Ret	SPA; 6H; 20	SPA; 12H; 27	SPA; 24H; 15	CAT; 18	4th	61
2020	Barwell Motorsport	Lamborghini Huracán GT3 Evo	Pro-Am	IMO; 34	NÜR; 25	SPA; 6H; 26	SPA; 12H; 22	SPA; 24H; 15	LEC; 22		3rd	76
2021	Barwell Motorsport	Lamborghini Huracán GT3 Evo	Pro-Am	MNZ	LEC	SPA; 6H; 19	SPA; 12H; 24	SPA; 24H; 18	NÜR	CAT	13th	33
2022	Barwell Motorsport	Lamborghini Huracán GT3 Evo	Gold	IMO; 40	LEC; 22	**SPA**; **6H**; 39	**SPA**; **12H**; 34	**SPA**; **24H**; Ret	HOC	CAT	15th	20
2023	K-PAX Racing	Lamborghini Huracán GT3 Evo 2	Pro	MNZ; Ret	LEC; 11	SPA; 6H; 17	SPA; 12H; 11	SPA; 24H; 29	NÜR; 9	CAT; 44	26th	2
2024	Barwell Motorsport	Lamborghini Huracán GT3 Evo 2	Bronze	LEC; 29	SPA; 6H; 42	SPA; 12H; 50	SPA; 24H; 35	NÜR; 29	MNZ; Ret	JED; 32	16th	24
2025	VSR	Lamborghini Huracán GT3 Evo 2	Pro	LEC; 14	MNZ; 9	SPA; 6H; 3	SPA; 12H; 46	SPA; 24H; Ret	NÜR; 15	CAT; 21	18th	9
2026	TGI Team by GRT	Lamborghini Temerario GT3	Pro	LEC	MNZ	SPA; 6H	SPA; 12H	SPA; 24H	NÜR; 18	ALG	NC	0

^{*} Season still in progress.

==== GT World Challenge Europe Sprint Cup ====
(key) (Races in bold indicate pole position) (Races in italics indicate fastest lap)

Year	Team	Car	Class	1	2	3	4	5	6	7	8	9	10	Pos.	Points
2024	Barwell Motorsport	Lamborghini Huracán GT3 Evo 2	Bronze	MIS; 1; 19	MIS; 2; 24	HOC; 1; 19	HOC; 2; 15	MAG; 1; 18	MAG; 2; 25	CAT; 1; 22	CAT; 2; 21			2nd	67.5
2025	Barwell Motorsport	Lamborghini Huracán GT3 Evo 2	Pro	BRH; 1; 10	BRH; 2; 7	ZAN; 1; 7	ZAN; 2; 29	MIS; 1; 16	MIS; 2; 16	MAG; 1; 16	MAG; 2; 11	VAL; 1 Ret	VAL; 2; 18	20th	6.5

=== Complete 24 Hours of Spa results ===
Year	Team	Co-Drivers	Car	Class	Laps	Pos.	Class Pos.
2018	(United Kingdom) Barwell Motorsport	(Italy) Michele Beretta (Netherlands) Rik Breukers (Croatia) Martin Kodrić	Lamborghini Huracán GT3	Silver	504	19th	**2nd**
2019	(United Kingdom) Barwell Motorsport	(United Kingdom) James Pull (United Kingdom) Jordan Witt	Lamborghini Huracán GT3 Evo	Silver	361	15th	**1st**
2020	(United Kingdom) Barwell Motorsport	(United Kingdom) Ricky Collard (United Kingdom) Rob Collard (Russia) Leo Machitski	Lamborghini Huracán GT3 Evo	Pro-Am	521	15th	**1st**
2021	(United Kingdom) Barwell Motorsport	(Portugal) Henrique Chaves (Russia) Leo Machitski (Portugal) Miguel Ramos	Lamborghini Huracán GT3 Evo	Pro-Am	547	18th	**3rd**
2022	(United Kingdom) Barwell Motorsport	(Oman) Ahmad Al Harthy (United Kingdom) Sam de Haan (United Kingdom) Alex MacDowall	Lamborghini Huracán GT3 Evo	Gold	333	DNF	DNF
2023	(United States) K-Pax Racing	(Italy) Marco Mapelli (France) Franck Perera	Lamborghini Huracán GT3 Evo 2	Pro	530	29th	14th

=== Complete IMSA SportsCar Championship results ===
(key) (Races in bold indicate pole position; results in italics indicate fastest lap)

Year	Team	Class	Make	Engine	1	2	3	4	5	6	7	8	9	10	11	12	Pos.	Points
2022	CarBahn with Peregrine Racing	GTD	Lamborghini Huracán GT3 Evo	Lamborghini DGF 5.2 L V10	DAY; 17	SEB	LBH	LGA	MDO	DET	WGL	MOS	LIM	ELK	VIR	PET	65th	163
2024	Forte Racing	GTD	Lamborghini Huracán GT3 Evo 2	Lamborghini DGF 5.2 L V10	DAY; 16	SEB	LBH	LGA	WGL	MOS							48th	316
2024	Wayne Taylor Racing with Andretti	GTD	Lamborghini Huracán GT3 Evo 2	Lamborghini DGF 5.2 L V10							ELK; 15	VIR	IMS	PET			48th	316
2025	Pfaff Motorsports	GTD Pro	Lamborghini Huracán GT3 Evo 2	Lamborghini DGF 5.2 L V10	DAY	SEB	LGA	DET	**WGL**; 9	MOS	ELK	VIR	IMS	PET			33th	255
2026	Pfaff Motorsports	GTD Pro	Lamborghini Huracán GT3 Evo 2	Lamborghini DGF 5.2 L V10	DAY; 6												2nd	2979
2026	Pfaff Motorsports	GTD Pro	Lamborghini Temerario GT3	Lamborghini L411 4.0 L Turbo V8		SEB; 10	LGA; 5	DET; 2	WGL; 9	MOS; 8	ELK; 1	VIR; 1	IMS; 3	PET; 4			2nd	2979

^{*} Season still in progress.

Sporting positions
Preceded by Jonny Adam; Graham Davidson	British GT Championship; GT3 Champion; 2020; With: Rob Collard	Succeeded by Dennis Lind; Leo Machitski
