= Colin Noble (racing driver) =

British racing driver (born 1996)

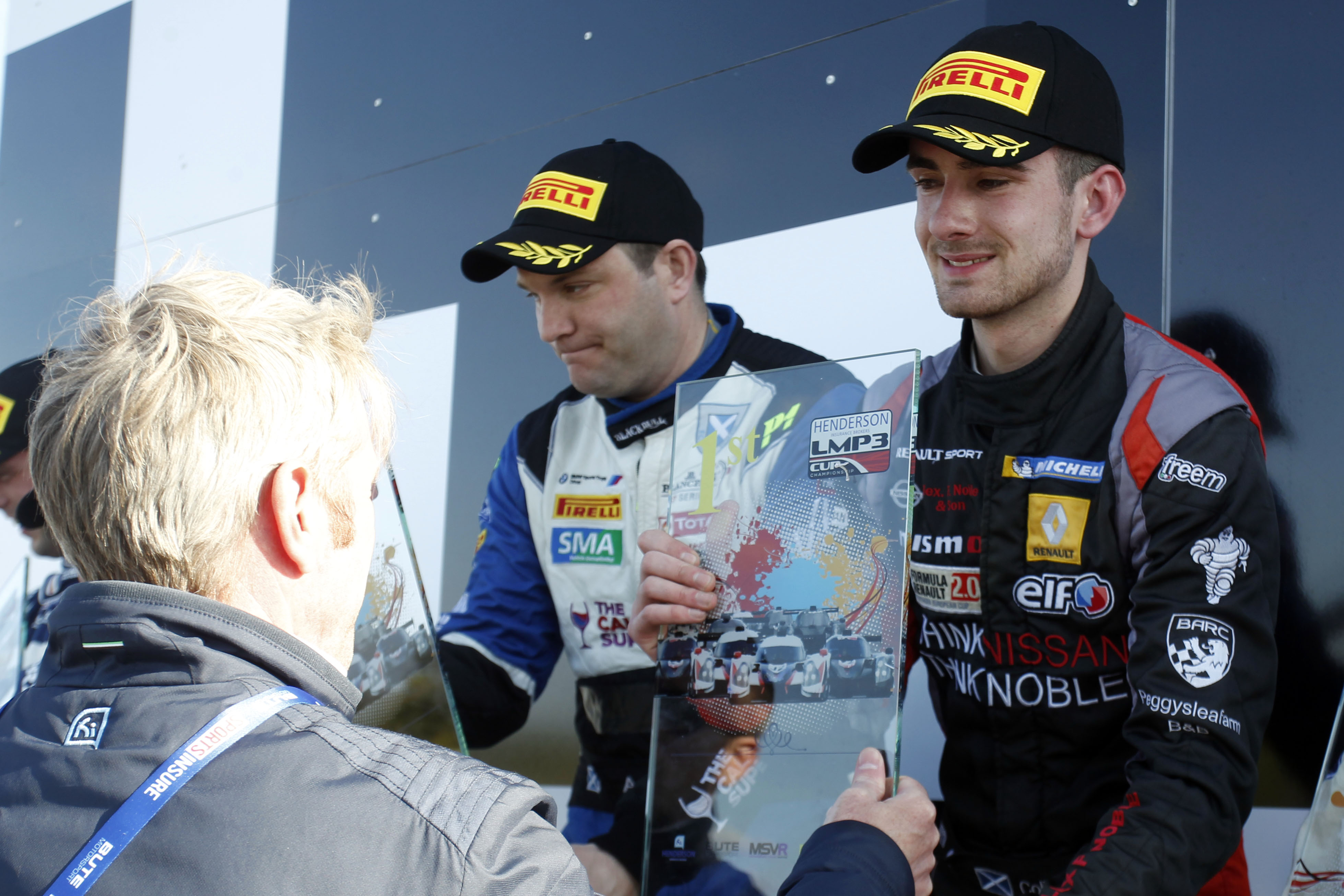
- Noble (right) in 2017
- Nationality: (United Kingdom) British
- Born: Colin James Noble; 28 July 1996 (age 30) Penicuik, Scotland, United Kingdom
- Categorisation: FIA Silver (until 2021); FIA Gold (2022–)

Championship titles
- 2021 2019–20 2017: Le Mans Cup – LMP3; Asian Le Mans Series – LMP3; British LMP3 Cup

Colin James Noble (born 28 July 1996) is a British racing driver from Scotland who last competed in the Le Mans Cup for Vector Sport RLR.

A long-time Nielsen Racing stalwart, Noble has won several titles in LMP3 competition: in the Asian Le Mans Series, Le Mans Cup and British LMP3 Cup. He is also an LMP2 podium finisher in the European Le Mans Series.

== Personal life ==
Noble is the son of former racing driver Colin Robert Foulis Noble, who is also the director of the family-run A.F. Noble & Son dealership, founded by Colin's great-grandfather Alex F. Noble in 1932.

== Career ==
Noble made his car racing debut in 2012, racing in the Radical UK and European Masters series. Spending two years in Radical competitions, during which he won the inaugural edition of the Radical SR1 Cup in 2013, Noble switched to single-seaters by joining MGR Motorsport to race in the 2014 Protyre Formula Renault Championship. In his first season in single-seaters, Noble took his only win of the season at the penultimate race of the season at Silverstone, which helped him secure fifth in points at season's end.

Noble then remained with MGR Motorsport for his only season in the 2015 Formula Renault 2.0 Northern European Cup, before spending most of 2016 for the Radical Works team in both the Radical European Masters and International GT Open series.

In 2017, Noble made his LMP3 debut, racing for Nielsen Racing in both the British LMP3 Cup and the Michelin Le Mans Cup. In the former, he won six of the 12 races contested and stood on the podium all but twice throughout the season to secure his first title in car racing. In the latter, Noble won on debut at Monza and scored three more podiums to end the season runner-up in points.

Noble remained in LMP3 competition for 2018, racing in both the European Le Mans Series and Le Mans Cup for Ecurie Ecosse/Nielsen. In his maiden season in the European Le Mans Series, Noble took three podiums in the six-race season, all being second-place finishes, en route to a fourth-place points finish at season's end. Whereas in his sophomore season in Le Mans Cup, Noble won at Spa and Algarve to finish runner-up in points by 11.5 points.

During 2018, Noble also made a one-off appearance in the Blancpain GT Series Endurance Cup for Team RJN. At the end of 2018, Noble made his debut in the 2018–19 Asian Le Mans Series for the same team, finishing no lower than fourth in the four-race season and scoring two podiums at Fuji and Buriram to secure third in points.

For his third season in LMP3 competition, Noble stayed with Nielsen Racing to compete in both the European Le Mans Series and Michelin Le Mans Cup. In the former, Noble took a best result of third at Spa and ended the year fifth in the class standings. Whereas in the latter, Noble took five podiums and also finished second at Spa, before being disqualified post-race, leading to a third-place points finish. At the end of 2019, Noble competed in the 2019–20 Asian Le Mans Series with the same team, winning at The Bend and finishing no lower than fourth in the other three races to secure the LMP3 title.

For the rest of 2020, Noble remained with Nielsen Racing in LMP3 competition, racing in European Le Mans Series and Michelin Le Mans Cup. In the former, Noble scored a lone podium at Spa and ended the year 17th in points, while in the latter, Noble won at Algarve en route to a fifth-place points finish. During 2020, Noble also made his LMGTE Am debut in the FIA World Endurance Championship for Red River Sport.

Noble stayed with Nielsen Racing the following year, as he competed in the LMP3 class of the Asian Le Mans Series, European Le Mans Series and Michelin Le Mans Cup. In the four-race winter season in Asia, Noble finished second in the season-opening race at Dubai and won race one at Abu Dhabi to finish third in points. In Europe, Noble finished a lowly 21st in the European Le Mans Series, whereas in the Michelin Le Mans Cup, Noble won at Le Castellet and Le Mans to secure his maiden series title.

Noble's Nielsen Racing Ligier JS P320 at the 2022 Road to Le Mans.

Remaining with Nielsen Racing for 2022, Noble competed for them in both the Asian Le Mans Series and Michelin Le Mans Cup's LMP3 classes. In the former, Noble won race two at Dubai and finished fourth in points, whereas in the latter, Noble scored podiums at Le Mans and Algarve to secure third in points. Noble was also set to make his debut in the IMSA SportsCar Championship that year for FastMD Racing, but ultimately did not race.

Staying in the Michelin Le Mans Cup for 2023, Noble joined Team Thor alongside Auðunn Guðmundsson. In their first season together, they scored a best result of second in race one at Le Mans and scored two other third-place finishes at Le Castellet and Aragón on their way to third in points.

Returning to the European Le Mans Series in 2024, Noble joined Nielsen Racing to make his debut in the LMP2 Pro-Am class, whilst also returning to Team Thor to compete in the Michelin Le Mans Cup. In the former, Noble scored two class podiums at Barcelona and Algarve on his way to fifth in points. In the latter, Noble won the season-ending round at Algarve on his way to fourth in points. Noble stayed with Nielsen Racing in 2025 to compete in the Michelin Le Mans Cup alongside Tom Fleming, with whom he took a best result of 11th at Barcelona en route to a 22nd-place points finish at season's end.

The following year, Noble switched to Vector Sport RLR as he remained in the Le Mans Cup, where he took a best result of seventh at Le Castellet, prior to being replaced by Enea Frey for the remainder of the season.

== Racing record ==
=== Racing career summary ===
Season	Series	Team	Races	Wins	Poles	F/Laps	Podiums	Points	Position
2012	Radical UK Cup – Supersport								
2013	Radical European Masters – Supersport							162	2nd
2013	Radical SR1 Cup		8	7	6	7	8	198	1st
2014	Protyre Formula Renault Championship	MGR Motorsport	15	1	1	0	3	286	5th
2015	Formula Renault 2.0 NEC	MGR Motorsport	16	0	0	0	0	135.5	10th
2016	International GT Open – GT3	Radical Works	8	0	0	0	0	0	26th
2016	Radical European Masters – Supersport	Radical Works	3	1	0	1	2		
2016	Radical European Masters – Masters	Radical Works	6	2	1	3	4		
2016	Eurocup Formula Renault 2.0	MGR Motorsport	2	0	0	0	0	0	NC†
2017	British LMP3 Cup	Nielsen Racing	12	6	0	3	10	223	1st
2017	Le Mans Cup – LMP3	Nielsen Racing	7	1	0	1	4	90	2nd
2017	Radical European Masters – Supersport	Nielsen Racing	3	0	0	0	0		
2017	Radical European Masters – Masters	Radical Works	3	2	2	1	2		
2017	Radical Festival	Radical Works	3	1	1	1	1		
2018	European Le Mans Series – LMP3	Ecurie Ecosse/Nielsen	6	0	0	0	3	58	4th
2018	Le Mans Cup – LMP3	Ecurie Ecosse/Nielsen	7	2	0	1	4	91.5	2nd
2018	Blancpain GT Series Endurance Cup – Silver	GT SPORT MOTUL Team RJN	1	0	0	0	0	4	21st
2018–19	Asian Le Mans Series – LMP3	Ecurie Ecosse/Nielsen Racing	4	0	0	0	2	54	3rd
2019	European Le Mans Series – LMP3	Nielsen Racing	6	0	0	1	1	63	5th
2019	Le Mans Cup – LMP3	Nielsen Racing	7	0	0	1	5	79	3rd
2019–20	FIA World Endurance Championship – LMGTE Am	Red River Sport	1	0	0	0	0	1	39th
2019–20	Asian Le Mans Series – LMP3	Nielsen Racing	4	1	1	1	3	75	1st
2020	European Le Mans Series – LMP3	Nielsen Racing	5	0	0	0	1	22.5	17th
2020	Le Mans Cup – LMP3	Nielsen Racing	7	1	0	0	2	55	5th
2021	Asian Le Mans Series – LMP3	Nielsen Racing	4	1	0	1	2	51	3rd
2021	European Le Mans Series – LMP3	Nielsen Racing	6	0	0	1	0	14	21st
2021	Le Mans Cup – LMP3	Nielsen Racing	7	2	0	1	3	75	1st
2022	Asian Le Mans Series – LMP3	Nielsen Racing	4	1	0	0	1	51	4th
2022	Le Mans Cup – LMP3	Nielsen Racing	7	0	0	0	2	55	3rd
2023	Le Mans Cup – LMP3	Team Thor	7	0	0	1	3	59	3rd
2023	IMSA SportsCar Championship – LMP3	Jr III Racing	1	0	0	0	0	262	35th
2024	Le Mans Cup – LMP3	Team Thor	7	1	0	0	1	60	4th
2024	European Le Mans Series – LMP2 Pro-Am	Nielsen Racing	6	0	0	0	2	70	5th
2025	Le Mans Cup – LMP3	Nielsen Racing	6	0	0	0	0	0	22nd
2026	Le Mans Cup – LMP3	Vector Sport RLR	2	0	0	0	0	6	20th

^{*} Season still in progress.

=== Complete Protyre Formula Renault Championship results ===
(key) (Races in bold indicate pole position) (Races in italics indicate fastest lap)

Year	Team	1	2	3	4	5	6	7	8	9	10	11	12	13	14	15	DC	Points
2014	MGR Motorsport	ROC; 1; 4	ROC; 2; 9	ROC; 3; 7	DON; 1; 4	DON; 2; 5	DON; 3; 2	BRH; 1 Ret	BRH; 2; 8	SNE; 1; 10	SNE; 2; 7	SNE; 3; 6	CRO; 1; 6	CRO; 2; 4	**SIL**; **1**; 1	SIL; 2; 2	5th	286

=== Complete Formula Renault 2.0 NEC results ===
(key) (Races in bold indicate pole position) (Races in italics indicate fastest lap)

Year	Entrant	1	2	3	4	5	6	7	8	9	10	11	12	13	14	15	16	DC	Points
2015	MGR Motorsport	MNZ; 1; 9	MNZ; 2 Ret	SIL; 1; 9	SIL; 2; 12	RBR; 1 Ret	RBR; 2; 9	RBR; 3; 8	SPA; 1; 12	SPA; 2; 12	ASS; 1; 9	ASS; 2; 10	NÜR; 1; 20	NÜR; 2; 9	HOC; 1; 13	HOC; 2; 10	HOC; 3; 12	10th	135.5

=== Complete Eurocup Formula Renault 2.0 results ===
(key) (Races in bold indicate pole position) (Races in italics indicate fastest lap)

Year	Team	1	2	3	4	5	6	7	8	9	10	11	12	13	14	15	DC	Points
2016	MGR Motorsport	ALC; 1	ALC; 2	ALC; 3	MON	MNZ; 1 Ret	MNZ; 2; 18	MNZ; 3; 18	RBR; 1	RBR; 2	LEC; 1	LEC; 2	SPA; 1	SPA; 2	EST; 1	EST; 2	NC†	0

† As Noble was a guest driver, he was ineligible for points

=== Complete Le Mans Cup results ===
(key) (Races in bold indicate pole position; results in italics indicate fastest lap)

Year	Entrant	Class	Chassis	1	2	3	4	5	6	7	Rank	Points
2017	Nielsen Racing	LMP3	Ligier JS P3	MNZ; 1	LMS; 1; 12	LMS; 2; 22	RBR; 2	LEC; 2	SPA; 2	POR; 5	2nd	90
2018	Ecurie Ecosse/Nielsen	LMP3	Ligier JS P3	LEC; 2	MNZ; 17	LMS; 1; 5	LMS; 2 Ret	RBR; 2	SPA; 1	POR; 1	2nd	91.5
2019	Nielsen Racing	LMP3	Norma M30	LEC; 3	MNZ; 3	LMS; 1; 3	LMS; 2; 5	BAR; 2	SPA; DSQ	POR; 2	3rd	79
2020	Nielsen Racing	LMP3	Duqueine M30 - D08	RIC; 14	SPA; 3	LEC; 6	LMS; 1; 16	LMS; 2; 4	MNZ; Ret	POR; 1	5th	55
2021	Nielsen Racing	LMP3	Ligier JS P320	BAR; 6	LEC; 1	MNZ; 3	LMS; 1; 1	LMS; 2 Ret	SPA; 5	POR; 9	1st	75
2022	Nielsen Racing	LMP3	Ligier JS P320	LEC; 6	IMO; 6	LMS; 1; 3	LMS; 2; 9	MNZ; Ret	SPA; 4	ALG; 2	3rd	55
2023	Team Thor	LMP3	Ligier JS P320	CAT; 4	LMS; 1; 2	LMS; 2; 15	LEC; 3	ARA; 3	SPA; 14	ALG; 6	3rd	59
2024	Team Thor	LMP3	Ligier JS P320	CAT; 6	LEC; 5	LMS; 1; 5	LMS; 2; 7	SPA; Ret	MUG; 5	ALG; 1	4th	60
2025	Nielsen Racing	LMP3	ADESS AD25	CAT; 11	LEC; Ret	LMS; 1; 20	LMS; 2; 15	SPA; 13	SIL; Ret	ALG; 16	22nd	0
2026	Vector Sport RLR	LMP3	Ligier JS P325	CAT; 21	LEC; 7	LMS	SPA	SIL	ALG		20th	6

^{*} Season still in progress.

=== Complete European Le Mans Series results ===
(key) (Races in bold indicate pole position; results in italics indicate fastest lap)

Year	Entrant	Class	Chassis	Engine	1	2	3	4	5	6	Rank	Points
2018	Ecurie Ecosse/Nielsen	LMP3	Ligier JS P3	Nissan VK50VE 5.0 L V8	LEC; 9	MNZ; 10	RBR; 2	SIL; 2	SPA; 9	ALG; 2	4th	58
2019	Nielsen Racing	LMP3	Norma M30	Nissan VK50VE 5.0 L V8	LEC; 5	MNZ; 7	CAT; 4	SIL; 5	SPA; 3	ALG; 5	5th	63
2020	Nielsen Racing	LMP3	Duqueine M30 – D08	Nissan VK56DE 5.6L V8	LEC; Ret	SPA; 2	LEC; Ret	MNZ; 8	ALG; 11		17th	22.5
2021	Nielsen Racing	LMP3	Ligier JS P320	Nissan VK56DE 5.6L V8	CAT; 9	RBR; 11	LEC; 5	MNZ; NC	SPA; 10	ALG; 14	21st	14
2024	Nielsen Racing	LMP2 Pro-Am	Oreca 07	Gibson GK428 4.2 L V8	CAT; 3	LEC; 5	IMO; 6	SPA; 4	MUG; 5	ALG; 3	5th	70

=== Complete GT World Challenge Europe results ===
==== GT World Challenge Europe Endurance Cup ====
(Races in bold indicate pole position) (Races in italics indicate fastest lap)

Year	Team	Car	Class	1	2	3	4	5	6	7	Pos.	Points
2018	GT SPORT MOTUL Team RJN	Nissan GT-R Nismo GT3 (2017)	Silver	MON	SIL	LEC	SPA; 6H	SPA; 12H	SPA; 24H	CAT; 42	21st	4

=== Complete Asian Le Mans Series results ===
(key) (Races in bold indicate pole position) (Races in italics indicate fastest lap)

Year	Team	Class	Car	Engine	1	2	3	4	Pos.	Points
2018–19	Ecurie Ecosse/Nielsen	LMP3	Ligier JS P3	Nissan VK50VE 5.0 L V8	SHA; 4	FUJ; 3	CHA; 3	SEP; 4	3rd	54
2019–20	Nielsen Racing	LMP3	Norma M30	Nissan VK50VE 5.0 L V8	SHA; 2	BEN; 1	CHA; 4	**SEP**; 2	1st	75
2021	Nielsen Racing	LMP3	Ligier JS P320	Nissan VK50VE 5.0 L V8	DUB; 1; 2	DUB; 2 Ret	ABU; 1; 1	ABU; 2; 6	3rd	51
2022	Nielsen Racing	LMP3	Ligier JS P320	Nissan VK50VE 5.0 L V8	DUB; 1; 7	DUB; 2; 1	ABU; 1; 4	ABU; 2; 6	4th	51

=== Complete IMSA WeatherTech SportsCar Championship results ===
(key) (Races in bold indicate pole position; races in italics indicate fastest lap)

Year	Entrant	Class	Chassis	Engine	1	2	3	4	5	6	7	Rank	Points
2023	Jr III Motorsports	LMP3	Ligier JS P320	Nissan VK56DE 5.6 L V8	DAY	SEB	WGL	MOS	ELK; 8	IMS	PET	35th	262
