= 2021 Le Mans Cup =

The 2021 Le Mans Cup, known as the 2021 Michelin Le Mans Cup under sponsorship, was the sixth season of the Le Mans Cup. It began on 17 April at the Circuit de Barcelona-Catalunya and ended on 25 October at the Algarve International Circuit. The series was open to Le Mans Prototypes in the LMP3 class, and grand tourer sports cars in the GT3 class.

== Calendar ==
The 2021 calendar was unveiled on 19 October 2020.

Round	Circuit	Location	Race length	Date
1	(Spain) Circuit de Barcelona-Catalunya	Montmeló, Spain	2 hours	17 April
2	(France) Circuit Paul Ricard	Le Castellet, France	2 hours	5 June
3	(Italy) Autodromo Nazionale Monza	Monza, Italy	2 hours	10 July
4	(France) Circuit de la Sarthe	Le Mans, France	55 minutes	19 August
4	(France) Circuit de la Sarthe	Le Mans, France	55 minutes	21 August
5	(Belgium) Circuit de Spa-Francorchamps	Spa, Belgium	2 hours	18 September
6	(Portugal) Algarve International Circuit	Portimão, Portugal	2 hours	24 October

=== Calendar changes ===
- Barcelona returned for 2021 after being cancelled due to the COVID-19 pandemic.

== Entries ==
=== LMP3 ===
All cars in the LMP3 class used the Nissan VK56DE 5.6L V8 engine and Michelin tyres.

Entrant/Team	Chassis	No.	Drivers	Rounds
(Luxembourg) DKR Engineering	Duqueine M30 – D08	1	(Australia) Nathan Kumar	4
(Luxembourg) DKR Engineering	Duqueine M30 – D08	1	(Switzerland) Marcello Marateotto	4
(Luxembourg) DKR Engineering	Duqueine M30 – D08	3	(United States) Jon Brownson	1, 3, 5
(Luxembourg) DKR Engineering	Duqueine M30 – D08	3	(United States) Dario Cangialosi	1, 3, 5
(Luxembourg) DKR Engineering	Duqueine M30 – D08	3	(Belgium) Kris Cools	2, 6
(Luxembourg) DKR Engineering	Duqueine M30 – D08	3	(France) Francois Kirmann	2, 6
(Luxembourg) DKR Engineering	Duqueine M30 – D08	3	(Belgium) Jean Glorieux	4
(Luxembourg) DKR Engineering	Duqueine M30 – D08	3	(Germany) Laurents Hörr	4
(Germany) Phoenix Racing	Ligier JS P320	5	(Germany) Finn Gehrsitz	1–5
(Germany) Phoenix Racing	Ligier JS P320	5	(Germany) Hamza Owega	1–5
(Germany) Phoenix Racing	Ligier JS P320	5	(Switzerland) Mathias Beche	6
(Germany) Phoenix Racing	Ligier JS P320	5	(United Kingdom) Ian Loggie	6
(Germany) Phoenix Racing	Ligier JS P320	60	(Germany) Frank Kräling	5–6
(Germany) Phoenix Racing	Ligier JS P320	60	(United States) Connor De Phillippi	5–6
(Switzerland) ANS Team JSE Management	Ligier JS P320	6	(Switzerland) Jonathan Brossard	2–3, 6
(Switzerland) ANS Team JSE Management	Ligier JS P320	6	(France) Nicholas Schatz	2–3, 6
(United Kingdom) Nielsen Racing	Ligier JS P320	7	(United Kingdom) Colin Noble	All
(United Kingdom) Nielsen Racing	Ligier JS P320	7	(United Kingdom) Anthony Wells	All
(United Kingdom) Nielsen Racing	Ligier JS P320	27	(United Kingdom) Nicholas Adcock	4
(United Kingdom) Nielsen Racing	Ligier JS P320	27	(Netherlands) Max Koebolt	4
(United Kingdom) Nielsen Racing	Ligier JS P320	27	(United Kingdom) Andrew Ferguson	6
(United Kingdom) Nielsen Racing	Ligier JS P320	27	(United Kingdom) Jeremy Ferguson	6
(United Kingdom) Nielsen Racing	Ligier JS P320	28	(United States) Tristan Nunez	4
(United Kingdom) Nielsen Racing	Ligier JS P320	28	(United States) Steven Thomas	4
(Germany) WTM Powered by Phoenix	Duqueine M30 – D08	11	(Germany) Torsten Kratz	All
(Germany) WTM Powered by Phoenix	Duqueine M30 – D08	11	(Germany) Leonard Weiss	All
(Germany) Black Falcon	Ligier JS P320	12	(Germany) Donar Munding	1–5
(Germany) Black Falcon	Ligier JS P320	12	(Germany) Maik Rosenberg	1–5
(United Kingdom) RLR MSport	Ligier JS P320	14	(Denmark) Malthe Jakobsen	4
(United Kingdom) RLR MSport	Ligier JS P320	14	(United Kingdom) Mike Benham	4
(United Kingdom) RLR MSport	Ligier JS P320	15	(United Kingdom) Mike Benham	1–3
(United Kingdom) RLR MSport	Ligier JS P320	15	(United Kingdom) Tommy Foster	1–3, 6
(United Kingdom) RLR MSport	Ligier JS P320	15	(United Kingdom) Alex Kapadia	4
(United Kingdom) RLR MSport	Ligier JS P320	15	(United Kingdom) Martin Rich	4
(United Kingdom) RLR MSport	Ligier JS P320	15	(Austria) Horst Felbermayr Jr.	6
(Poland) Team Virage	Ligier JS P320	16	(France) Sacha Lehmann	All
(Poland) Team Virage	Ligier JS P320	16	(Spain) Julien Gerbi	1, 5
(Poland) Team Virage	Ligier JS P320	16	(Germany) Matthias Lüthen	2–4
(Poland) Team Virage	Ligier JS P320	16	(Portugal) Miguel Cristóvão	6
(Poland) Team Virage	Ligier JS P320	71	(United States) Rob Hodes	All
(Poland) Team Virage	Ligier JS P320	71	(Canada) Garett Grist	1–5
(Poland) Team Virage	Ligier JS P320	71	(France) Mathis Poulet	6
(France) IDEC Sport	Ligier JS P320	17	(France) Dimitri Enjalbert	All
(France) IDEC Sport	Ligier JS P320	17	(France) Patrice Lafargue	All
(Belgium) Mühlner Motorsport	Duqueine M30 – D08	18	(France) Tom Dillmann	1
(Belgium) Mühlner Motorsport	Duqueine M30 – D08	18	(Germany) Matthias Lüthen	1
(Belgium) Mühlner Motorsport	Duqueine M30 – D08	18	(Norway) Ayla Ågren	2
(Belgium) Mühlner Motorsport	Duqueine M30 – D08	18	(France) Mathieu de Barbuat	2
(Belgium) Mühlner Motorsport	Duqueine M30 – D08	18	(France) Dino Lunardi	3
(Belgium) Mühlner Motorsport	Duqueine M30 – D08	18	(Italy) Francesco Zollo	3
(Belgium) Mühlner Motorsport	Duqueine M30 – D08	18	(Australia) Andres Latorre Canon	4–5
(Belgium) Mühlner Motorsport	Duqueine M30 – D08	18	(Australia) Garnet Patterson	4–5
(Belgium) Mühlner Motorsport	Duqueine M30 – D08	18	(Australia) James Allen	6
(Belgium) Mühlner Motorsport	Duqueine M30 – D08	18	(United States) John Falb	6
(Belgium) Mühlner Motorsport	Duqueine M30 – D08	21	(France) Erwin Creed	1–2
(Belgium) Mühlner Motorsport	Duqueine M30 – D08	21	(Germany) Markus Pommer	1–2
(Belgium) Mühlner Motorsport	Duqueine M30 – D08	21	(Netherlands) Jeroen Bleekemolen	3
(Belgium) Mühlner Motorsport	Duqueine M30 – D08	21	(United Kingdom) Freddie Hunt	3
(Belgium) Mühlner Motorsport	Duqueine M30 – D08	21	(Belgium) Ugo de Wilde	4–6
(Belgium) Mühlner Motorsport	Duqueine M30 – D08	21	(Germany) Moritz Kranz	4
(Belgium) Mühlner Motorsport	Duqueine M30 – D08	21	(Germany) Thorsten Jung	5
(Belgium) Mühlner Motorsport	Duqueine M30 – D08	21	(United States) Charles Crews	6
(Switzerland) Cool Racing	Ligier JS P320	19	(France) Mathieu de Barbuat	4
(Switzerland) Cool Racing	Ligier JS P320	19	(Germany) Niklas Krütten	4
(Switzerland) Cool Racing	Ligier JS P320	37	(France) Antoine Doquin	All
(Switzerland) Cool Racing	Ligier JS P320	37	(United Kingdom) Josh Skelton	All
(Switzerland) Cool Racing	Ligier JS P320	69	(United Kingdom) Matthew Bell	All
(Switzerland) Cool Racing	Ligier JS P320	69	(United States) Maurice Smith	All
(United Kingdom) Grainmarket Racing	Duqueine M30 – D08	20	(United Kingdom) Mark Crader	All
(United Kingdom) Grainmarket Racing	Duqueine M30 – D08	20	(United Kingdom) Alex Mortimer	All
(United Kingdom) United Autosports	Ligier JS P320	22	(Australia) Scott Andrews	All
(United Kingdom) United Autosports	Ligier JS P320	22	(United States) Gerald Kraut	All
(United Kingdom) United Autosports	Ligier JS P320	23	(United States) John Schauerman	All
(United Kingdom) United Autosports	Ligier JS P320	23	(United Kingdom) Wayne Boyd	1–3, 5–6
(United Kingdom) United Autosports	Ligier JS P320	23	(United Kingdom) Duncan Tappy	4
(United Kingdom) United Autosports	Ligier JS P320	26	(United States) James McGuire	4
(United Kingdom) United Autosports	Ligier JS P320	26	(United Kingdom) Guy Smith	4
(United Kingdom) United Autosports	Ligier JS P320	32	(United Kingdom) Andy Meyrick	All
(United Kingdom) United Autosports	Ligier JS P320	32	(Brazil) Daniel Schneider	All
(Switzerland) Racing Spirit of Léman	Ligier JS P320	25	(France) Jacques Wolff	All
(Switzerland) Racing Spirit of Léman	Ligier JS P320	25	(France) Théo Chalal	1–5
(Switzerland) Racing Spirit of Léman	Ligier JS P320	25	(France) Antoine Jung	6
(Switzerland) Racing Spirit of Léman	Ligier JS P320	52	(Netherlands) Mathijs Bakker	4
(Switzerland) Racing Spirit of Léman	Ligier JS P320	52	(Netherlands) Tijmen van der Helm	4
(Australia) Revere Racing	ADESS-03 Evo	29	(France) Simon Escallier	4
(Australia) Revere Racing	ADESS-03 Evo	29	(United States) John Falb	4
(Germany) Frikadelli Racing Team	Ligier JS P320	30	(Germany) Klaus Abbelen	3–5
(Germany) Frikadelli Racing Team	Ligier JS P320	30	(Zimbabwe) Axcil Jefferies	3–5
(Italy) AF Corse	Ligier JS P320	31	(Portugal) Rui Águas	1–3, 5–6
(Italy) AF Corse	Ligier JS P320	31	(Greece) Kriton Lendoudis	1–3, 5–6
(Spain) CD Sport	Ligier JS P320	33	(France) Adam Eteki	All
(Spain) CD Sport	Ligier JS P320	33	(Denmark) Michael Jensen	All
(Germany) Rinaldi Racing	Duqueine M30 – D08	55	(Germany) Steve Parrow	All
(Germany) Rinaldi Racing	Duqueine M30 – D08	55	(Germany) Dominik Schwager	All
(Germany) Rinaldi Racing	Duqueine M30 – D08	66	(Germany) Alexander Mattschull	All
(Germany) Rinaldi Racing	Duqueine M30 – D08	66	(Argentina) Nicolás Varrone	All
(France) R-Breizh Competition	ADESS-03 Evo	56	(France) Cedric Chapron	1
(France) R-Breizh Competition	ADESS-03 Evo	56	(France) Simon Escallier	1
(Italy) TS Corse	Ligier JS P320	73	(Republic of Ireland) Cian Carey	All
(Italy) TS Corse	Ligier JS P320	73	(Italy) Pietro Peccenini	All
(France) MV2S Racing	Ligier JS P320	74	(France) Sébastien Baud	4
(France) MV2S Racing	Ligier JS P320	74	(France) Christophe Cresp	4
(Iceland) Team Thor	Ligier JS P320	77	(Iceland) Auðunn Guðmundsson	All
(Iceland) Team Thor	Ligier JS P320	77	(United Kingdom) Tom Ashton	1–2, 4, 6
(Iceland) Team Thor	Ligier JS P320	77	(Denmark) Anders Fjordbach	3, 5
(Belgium) Motorsport98	Ligier JS P320	98	(Belgium) Eric De Doncker	1–2, 4–5
(Belgium) Motorsport98	Ligier JS P320	98	(France) Dino Lunardi	1–2, 4–5

=== Innovative car ===
Entrant/Team	Car	No.	Drivers	Rounds
(France) H24 Racing	LMPH2G	24	(Monaco) Stéphane Richelmi	5–6

=== GT3 ===
Team	Car	Engine	No.	Drivers	Rounds
(Switzerland) Pzoberer Zürichsee by TFT	Porsche 911 GT3 R	Porsche 4.0 L Flat-6	2	(Switzerland) Nicolas Leutwiler	All
(Switzerland) Pzoberer Zürichsee by TFT	Porsche 911 GT3 R	Porsche 4.0 L Flat-6	2	(France) Julien Andlauer	1, 3–6
(Switzerland) Pzoberer Zürichsee by TFT	Porsche 911 GT3 R	Porsche 4.0 L Flat-6	2	(Germany) Wolf Henzler	2
(Italy) Iron Lynx	Ferrari 488 GT3 Evo 2020	Ferrari F154CB 3.9 L Turbo V8	8	(Italy) Rino Mastronardi	1–2
(Italy) Iron Lynx	Ferrari 488 GT3 Evo 2020	Ferrari F154CB 3.9 L Turbo V8	8	(Italy) Paolo Ruberti	1, 3, 5–6
(Italy) Iron Lynx	Ferrari 488 GT3 Evo 2020	Ferrari F154CB 3.9 L Turbo V8	8	(United States) Logan Sargeant	2, 4
(Italy) Iron Lynx	Ferrari 488 GT3 Evo 2020	Ferrari F154CB 3.9 L Turbo V8	8	(Italy) Gabriele Lancieri	3, 5–6
(Italy) Iron Lynx	Ferrari 488 GT3 Evo 2020	Ferrari F154CB 3.9 L Turbo V8	8	(Finland) Rory Penttinen	4
(Italy) Iron Lynx	Ferrari 488 GT3 Evo 2020	Ferrari F154CB 3.9 L Turbo V8	9	(France) Doriane Pin	All
(Italy) Iron Lynx	Ferrari 488 GT3 Evo 2020	Ferrari F154CB 3.9 L Turbo V8	9	(Belgium) Sarah Bovy	1–3
(Italy) Iron Lynx	Ferrari 488 GT3 Evo 2020	Ferrari F154CB 3.9 L Turbo V8	9	(Italy) Manuela Gostner	4–6
(United Kingdom) ROFGO Racing with Team WRT	Audi R8 LMS Evo	Audi 5.2 L V10	34	(Germany) Benjamin Goethe	4
(United Kingdom) ROFGO Racing with Team WRT	Audi R8 LMS Evo	Audi 5.2 L V10	34	(Germany) Roald Goethe	4
(Belgium) Belgian Audi Club Team WRT	Audi R8 LMS Evo	Audi 5.2 L V10	72	(Switzerland) Jean-Denis Delétraz	4
(Belgium) Belgian Audi Club Team WRT	Audi R8 LMS Evo	Audi 5.2 L V10	72	(Belgium) Charles Weerts	4
(Italy) AF Corse	Ferrari 488 GT3 Evo 2020	Ferrari F154CB 3.9 L Turbo V8	51	(Japan) Kenji Abe	1–4
(Italy) AF Corse	Ferrari 488 GT3 Evo 2020	Ferrari F154CB 3.9 L Turbo V8	51	(Italy) Matteo Cressoni	1–3
(Italy) AF Corse	Ferrari 488 GT3 Evo 2020	Ferrari F154CB 3.9 L Turbo V8	51	(Italy) Eddie Cheever III	4
(Italy) AF Corse	Ferrari 488 GT3 Evo 2020	Ferrari F154CB 3.9 L Turbo V8	61	(France) Franck Dezoteux	2
(Italy) AF Corse	Ferrari 488 GT3 Evo 2020	Ferrari F154CB 3.9 L Turbo V8	61	(France) Stephane Tribaudini	2
(Italy) AF Corse	Ferrari 488 GT3 Evo 2020	Ferrari F154CB 3.9 L Turbo V8	61	(Switzerland) Gino Forgione	3–4
(Italy) AF Corse	Ferrari 488 GT3 Evo 2020	Ferrari F154CB 3.9 L Turbo V8	61	(Italy) Andrea Montermini	3–4
(Italy) AF Corse	Ferrari 488 GT3 Evo 2020	Ferrari F154CB 3.9 L Turbo V8	62	(France) Franck Dezoteux	4
(Italy) AF Corse	Ferrari 488 GT3 Evo 2020	Ferrari F154CB 3.9 L Turbo V8	62	(France) Stephane Tribaudini	4
(France) Racetivity	Mercedes-AMG GT3 Evo	Mercedes-AMG M159 6.2 L V8	83	(France) Emmanuel Collard	4
(France) Racetivity	Mercedes-AMG GT3 Evo	Mercedes-AMG M159 6.2 L V8	83	(France) Charles-Henri Samani	4
(Germany) Herberth Motorsport	Porsche 911 GT3 R	Porsche 4.0 L Flat-6	91	(Germany) Ralf Bohn	2
(Germany) Herberth Motorsport	Porsche 911 GT3 R	Porsche 4.0 L Flat-6	91	(Germany) Robert Renauer	2
(Germany) Herberth Motorsport	Porsche 911 GT3 R	Porsche 4.0 L Flat-6	92	(Germany) Alfred Renauer	2, 4
(Germany) Herberth Motorsport	Porsche 911 GT3 R	Porsche 4.0 L Flat-6	92	(Switzerland) Daniel Allemann	2
(Germany) Herberth Motorsport	Porsche 911 GT3 R	Porsche 4.0 L Flat-6	92	(Germany) Jürgen Häring	4
(Germany) 10Q Racing Team	Mercedes-AMG GT3 Evo	Mercedes-AMG M159 6.2 L V8	93	(Germany) Kenneth Heyer	1
(Germany) 10Q Racing Team	Mercedes-AMG GT3 Evo	Mercedes-AMG M159 6.2 L V8	93	(Belgium) Wim Spinoy	1
Oman Racing Team with TF Sport	Aston Martin Vantage AMR GT3	Aston Martin 4.0 L Turbo V8	95	(Oman) Ahmad Al Harthy	4
Oman Racing Team with TF Sport	Aston Martin Vantage AMR GT3	Aston Martin 4.0 L Turbo V8	95	(United States) Michael Dinan	4
(United Kingdom) TF Sport	Aston Martin Vantage AMR GT3	Aston Martin 4.0 L Turbo V8	97	(United Kingdom) Ross Gunn	3
(United Kingdom) TF Sport	Aston Martin Vantage AMR GT3	Aston Martin 4.0 L Turbo V8	97	(United States) Ben Keating	3

== Race results ==
Bold indicates the overall winner.

Round		Circuit	LMP3 Winners	GT3 Winners
1		(Spain) Barcelona	**(United Kingdom) No. 22 United Autosports** (Note: The LMP3 class winner at Barcelona was the No. 15 RLR MSport invitational entry. As it is not a full season entrant, the points for the win are awarded to the No. 22 United Autosports entry.)	(Switzerland) No. 2 Pzoberer Zürichsee by TFT
1		(Spain) Barcelona	**(Australia) Scott Andrews** **(United States) Gerald Kraut**	(France) Julien Andlauer (Switzerland) Nicolas Leutwiler
2		(France) Le Castellet	**(United Kingdom) No. 7 Nielsen Racing**	(Italy) No. 8 Iron Lynx (Note: The GT3 class winner at Le Castellet was the No. 92 Herberth Motorsport invitational entry. As it is not a full season entrant, the points for the win are awarded to the No. 8 Iron Lynx entry.)
2		(France) Le Castellet	**(United Kingdom) Colin Noble** **(United States) Anthony Wells**	(Italy) Rino Mastronardi (United States) Logan Sargeant
3		(Italy) Monza	**(United Kingdom) No. 22 United Autosports**	(Italy) No. 8 Iron Lynx
3		(Italy) Monza	**(Australia) Scott Andrews** **(United States) Gerald Kraut**	(Italy) Gabriele Lancieri (Italy) Paolo Ruberti
4	R1	(France) Le Mans (report)	**(United Kingdom) No. 7 Nielsen Racing**	(Italy) No. 8 Iron Lynx
4	R1	(France) Le Mans (report)	**(United Kingdom) Colin Noble** **(United States) Anthony Wells**	(Finland) Rory Penttinen (United States) Logan Sargeant
4	R2	(France) Le Mans (report)	**(Belgium) No. 21 Mühlner Motorsport**	(Switzerland) No. 2 Pzoberer Zürichsee by TFT
4	R2	(France) Le Mans (report)	**(Belgium) Ugo de Wilde** **(Germany) Moritz Kranz**	(Switzerland) Nicolas Leutwiler (France) Julien Andlauer
5		(Belgium) Spa-Francorchamps	**(Switzerland) No. 37 Cool Racing**	(Italy) No. 8 Iron Lynx
5		(Belgium) Spa-Francorchamps	**(France) Antoine Doquin** **(United Kingdom) Josh Skelton**	(Italy) Gabriele Lancieri (Italy) Paolo Ruberti
6		(Portugal) Portimão	**(Germany) No. 5 Phoenix Racing**	(Italy) No. 8 Iron Lynx
6		(Portugal) Portimão	**(Switzerland) Mathias Beche** **(United Kingdom) Ian Loggie**	(Italy) Gabriele Lancieri (Italy) Paolo Ruberti

== Standings ==
Points are awarded according to the following structure:

Position	1st	2nd	3rd	4th	5th	6th	7th	8th	9th	10th	Other	Pole
Points	25	18	15	12	10	8	6	4	2	1	0.5	1
Le Mans	15	9	7	6	5	4	3	2	1	0.5	0.5	1

=== LMP3 Teams Championship ===
Pos.	Team	Car	BAR (Spain)	LEC (France)	MNZ (Italy)	LMS (France)		SPA (Belgium)	POR (Portugal)	Points
1	(United Kingdom) #7 Nielsen Racing	Ligier JS P320	6	1	3	1	Ret	5	9	75
2	(Switzerland) #69 Cool Racing	Ligier JS P320	3	2	12	3	14	2	4	71
3	(Germany) #66 Rinaldi Racing	Duqueine M30 – D08	5	6	2	2	2	6	7	68
4	(Germany) #5 Phoenix Racing	Ligier JS P320	7	4	**Ret**	12	5	**4**	1	62.5
5	(United Kingdom) #23 United Autosports	Ligier JS P320	2	3	4	13	6	9	10	52.5
6	(United Kingdom) #22 United Autosports	Ligier JS P320	1	Ret	1	9	Ret	12	13	52
7	(Switzerland) #37 Cool Racing	Ligier JS P320	**11**	**Ret**	7	7	17	1	**15**	38.5
8	(Germany) #11 WTM Powered by Phoenix	Duqueine M30 – D08	Ret	10	11	Ret	4	3	3	37.5
9	(Poland) #71 Team Virage	Ligier JS P320	4	Ret	6	8	3	8	18	33.5
10	(United Kingdom) #32 United Autosports	Ligier JS P320	Ret	5	DNS	4	8	21	6	26
11	(Belgium) #21 Mühlner Motorsport	Duqueine M30 – D08	Ret	12	9	18	**1**	13	8	23.5
12	(Switzerland) #25 Racing Spirit of Léman	Ligier JS P320	9	18	13	15	15	16	2	22.5
13	(Spain) #33 CD Sport	Ligier JS P320	17	7	10	6	11	18	5	22.5
14	(Luxembourg) #3 DKR Engineering	Duqueine M30 – D08	19	14	5	**16**	Ret	19	14	13.5
15	(Belgium) #98 Motorsport98	Ligier JS P320	12	8		19	DNS	7		11
16	(Belgium) #18 Mühlner Motorsport	Duqueine M30 – D08	10	17	Ret	5	9	23	17	8
17	(Poland) #16 Team Virage	Ligier JS P320	15	9	Ret	17	7	20	11	6.5
18	(France) #17 IDEC Sport	Ligier JS P320	8	Ret	Ret	20	12	11	12	6
19	(Italy) #31 AF Corse	Ligier JS P320	18	15	8	Ret		15	16	6
20	(Germany) #12 Black Falcon	Ligier JS P320	13	16	15	14	18	10		3.5
21	(Iceland) #77 Team Thor	Ligier JS P320	14	11	14	11	10	17	14	3.5
22	(United Kingdom) #20 Grainmarket Racing	Duqueine M30 – D08	16	14	Ret	Ret	16	22	19	1.5
23	(Germany) #30 Frikadelli Racing Team	Ligier JS P320			Ret	10	13	14		1.5
Pos.	Team	Car	BAR (Spain)	LEC (France)	MNZ (Italy)	LMS (France)		SPA (Belgium)	POR (Portugal)	Points

Key
Colour	Result
Gold	Race winner
Silver	2nd place
Bronze	3rd place
Green	Points finish
Blue	Non-points finish
Blue	Non-classified finish (NC)
Purple	Did not finish (Ret)
Black	Disqualified (DSQ)
Black	Excluded (EX)
White	Did not start (DNS)
White	Race cancelled (C)
White	Withdrew (WD)
Blank	Did not participate

**Bold** – Pole
Italics – Fastest Lap

=== GT3 Teams Championship ===
Pos.	Team	Car	BAR (Spain)	LEC (France)	MNZ (Italy)	LMS (France)		SPA (Belgium)	POR (Portugal)	Points
1	(Italy) #8 Iron Lynx	Ferrari 488 GT3 Evo 2020	**2**	**1**	**1**	1	**2**	**1**	**1**	148
2	(Switzerland) #2 Pzoberer Zürichsee by TFT	Porsche 911 GT3 R	1	3	3	**Ret**	1	2	2	107
3	(Italy) #9 Iron Lynx	Ferrari 488 GT3 Evo 2020	DNS	2	2	2	3	3	Ret	67
4	(Italy) #51 AF Corse	Ferrari 488 GT3 Evo 2020	3	4	4	Ret	DNS			39
5	(Germany) #93 10Q Racing Team	Mercedes-AMG GT3 Evo	4							12
Pos.	Team	Car	BAR (Spain)	LEC (France)	MNZ (Italy)	LMS (France)		SPA (Belgium)	POR (Portugal)	Points

Key
Colour	Result
Gold	Race winner
Silver	2nd place
Bronze	3rd place
Green	Points finish
Blue	Non-points finish
Blue	Non-classified finish (NC)
Purple	Did not finish (Ret)
Black	Disqualified (DSQ)
Black	Excluded (EX)
White	Did not start (DNS)
White	Race cancelled (C)
White	Withdrew (WD)
Blank	Did not participate

**Bold** – Pole
Italics – Fastest Lap

=== LMP3 Driver's championships (top-5) ===
Pos.	Driver	Team	BAR (Spain)	LEC (France)	MNZ (Italy)	LMS (France)		SPA (Belgium)	POR (Portugal)	Total
1	(United Kingdom) Colin Noble	(United Kingdom) Nielsen Racing	6	1	3	1	Ret	5	9	75
1	(United Kingdom) Anthony Wells	(United Kingdom) Nielsen Racing	6	1	3	1	Ret	5	9	75
2	(United Kingdom) Matthew Bell	(Switzerland) Cool Racing	3	2	12	3	14	2	4	71
2	(United States) Maurice Smith	(Switzerland) Cool Racing	3	2	12	3	14	2	4	71
3	(Germany) Alexander Mattschull	(Germany) Rinaldi Racing	5	6	2	2	2	6	7	68
3	(Argentina) Nicolás Varrone	(Germany) Rinaldi Racing	5	6	2	2	2	6	7	68
4	(United States) John Schauerman	(United Kingdom) United Autosports	2	3	4	13	6	9	10	52.5
5	(Australia) Scott Andrews	(United Kingdom) United Autosports	1	Ret	1	9	Ret	12	13	52
5	(United States) Gerald Kraut	(United Kingdom) United Autosports	1	Ret	1	9	Ret	12	13	52
Pos.	Team	Car	BAR (Spain)	LEC (France)	MNZ (Italy)	LMS (France)		SPA (Belgium)	POR (Portugal)	Points

Key
Colour	Result
Gold	Race winner
Silver	2nd place
Bronze	3rd place
Green	Points finish
Blue	Non-points finish
Blue	Non-classified finish (NC)
Purple	Did not finish (Ret)
Black	Disqualified (DSQ)
Black	Excluded (EX)
White	Did not start (DNS)
White	Race cancelled (C)
White	Withdrew (WD)
Blank	Did not participate

**Bold** – Pole

=== GT3 Drivers Championship ===
Pos.	Driver	Team	BAR (Spain)	LEC (France)	MNZ (Italy)	LMS (France)		SPA (Belgium)	POR (Portugal)	Total
1	(Switzerland) Nicholas Leutwiller	(Switzerland) Pzoberer Zürichsee by TFT	25	15	15	**Ret**	15	18	18	107
2	(Italy) Paolo Ruberti	(Italy) Iron Lynx	**19**		**26**			**26**	**26**	97
3	(France) Julien Andlauer	(Switzerland) Pzoberer Zürichsee by TFT	25		15	**Ret**	15	18	18	92
4	(Italy) Gabriele Lancieri	(Italy) Iron Lynx			**26**			**26**	**26**	78
5	(France) Doriane Pin	(Italy) Iron Lynx		18	18	9	7	15	DNC	67
6	(United States) Logan Sargeant	(Italy) Iron Lynx		**26** (Note: The GT3 class winner at Le Castellet was the No. 92 Herberth Motorsport invitational entry. As it is not a full season entrant, the points for the win are awarded to the No. 8 Iron Lynx entry.)		15	**10**			51
7	(Italy) Rino Mastronardi	(Italy) Iron Lynx	**19**	**26**						45
8	(Japan) Ken Abe	(Italy) AF Corse	15	12	12					39
9	(Italy) Matteo Cressoni	(Italy) AF Corse	15	12	12					39
10	(Belgium) Sarah Bovy	(Italy) Iron Lynx		18	18					36
11	(Italy) Manuela Gostner	(Italy) Iron Lynx				9	7	15	DNC	31
12	(Finland) Rory Penttinen	(Italy) Iron Lynx				15	**10**			25
13	(Germany) Wolf Henzler	(Switzerland) Pzoberer Zürichsee by TFT		15	15					15
14	(Germany) Kenneth Heyer	(Germany) 10Q Racing Team	12							12
14	(Belgium) Wim Spinoy	(Germany) 10Q Racing Team	12							12
15	(Italy) Eddie Cheever III	(Italy) AF Corse								0
Pos.	Team	Car	BAR (Spain)	LEC (France)	MNZ (Italy)	LMS (France)		SPA (Belgium)	POR (Portugal)	Points

Key
Colour	Result
Gold	Race winner
Silver	2nd place
Bronze	3rd place
Green	Points finish
Blue	Non-points finish
Blue	Non-classified finish (NC)
Purple	Did not finish (Ret)
Black	Disqualified (DSQ)
Black	Excluded (EX)
White	Did not start (DNS)
White	Race cancelled (C)
White	Withdrew (WD)
Blank	Did not participate

**Bold** – Pole
