= British LMP3 Cup =

The LMP3 Cup Championship (previously known as the Prototype Cup) was a British-based sports car racing endurance series, endorsed by the Automobile Club de l'Ouest. The championship was designed as an initial step on the ladder to the 24 Hours of Le Mans, as well as providing further opportunities for teams to run the increasingly popular LMP3 specification cars.

An initial race was held at Snetterton Circuit on 8/9 October 2016, ahead of a 12-race season in 2017, featuring five rounds in the United Kingdom and one at Circuit de Spa-Francorchamps in Belgium. Following the low turn out of cars for the previous seasons, it was decided by Championship Organisers Bute Motorsport that they would shift its focus to its more successful sister championship, the GT Cup for 2019. However, it was noted that Bute Motorsport would continue to assess its viability, and would consider bringing it back, should it become viable once more.

== Rules ==
The championship was open to LMP3 cars which are Automobile Club de l'Ouest (ACO)-homologated, each carrying an ACO-issued technical passport to ensure all cars meet the correct specifications. Engines are supplied by Nissan, utilising the VK50VE V8 engines.

The championship regulations initially stated that one of the drivers must be of Bronze designation, as specified by the Fédération Internationale de l'Automobile, though this was changed mid-season to allow Silver/Silver pairings, in an attempt to open up the number of competitors in the series.

== Race format ==
Each round follows the same format:

Saturday: Practice (60 minutes), Qualifying (10 minutes), Race (60 minutes).

Sunday: Qualifying (10 minutes), Race (60 minutes).

The Bronze-rated driver must qualify the car and start the race, which contains a mandatory pit stop of prescribed length.

Points are scored as follows:

Position	1	2	3	4	5	6	7	8	9	10
Points	25	18	15	12	10	8	6	4	2	1

== 2016 ==
A one-off race was held at Snetterton Circuit on 8/9 October 2016, to showcase the new Prototype Cup Championship ahead of a full-season in 2017. Eight cars entered the event, which was won by Phil Hanson and Nigel Moore for Tockwith Motorsport.

== 2017 ==
The 2017 season was announced on 4 November 2016, and would take in 12 races at six rounds, including an overseas trip to Circuit de Spa-Francorchamps in June. The calendar was amended on 7 December 2016 due to the British Grand Prix date changing.

On 6 January 2017, it was announced that the Prototype Cup would be renamed the LMP3 Cup Championship after agreement from the Automobile Club de l'Ouest. As part of this agreement, it was also announced that the Driver Champion of the 2017 LMP3 Cup Championship would receive a complimentary entry into the 2018 Michelin Le Mans Cup, with a value of over €45,000. The prize included an entry in the Road to Le Mans race, which takes place hours before the famous 24-hour race.

Scottish pairing Alasdair McCaig and Colin Noble secured the inaugural championship at the season's tenth race, at Snetterton Circuit.

== 2018 ==
The 2018 calendar was revealed on 8 November 2017, with the series visiting the same circuits as before, but in a different order, with the season ending at Silverstone in October.

== Champions ==
Year	Drivers	Team	Chassis	Engine	Poles	Wins	Podiums	Points
2017	(United Kingdom) Alasdair McCaig (United Kingdom) Colin Noble	Ecurie Ecosse Nielsen Racing	Ligier JS P3	Nissan VK50VE	1	6	10	232
