= 2017 British LMP3 Cup =

The 2017 Henderson Insurance Brokers LMP3 Cup Championship was the inaugural season for the British LMP3 Cup. The series started at Donington Park on 22–23 April, and finished at the same circuit on 16–17 September.

== Teams and drivers ==
Team	No.	Chassis	Engine	Driver(s)	Rounds
(United States) United Autosports (United Kingdom) Red River Sport (Note: The No. 22 was run by United Autosports on behalf of Red River Sport.)	2	Ligier JS P3	Nissan VK50VE	(United States) CJ Wilson	3-6
(United States) United Autosports (United Kingdom) Red River Sport	2	Ligier JS P3	Nissan VK50VE	(United Kingdom) Christian England	1-2, 7-12
(United States) United Autosports (United Kingdom) Red River Sport	2	Ligier JS P3	Nissan VK50VE	(United States) Andrew Evans	1-12
(United States) United Autosports (United Kingdom) Red River Sport	3	Ligier JS P3	Nissan VK50VE	(United Kingdom) Tony Wells	1-12
(United States) United Autosports (United Kingdom) Red River Sport	3	Ligier JS P3	Nissan VK50VE	(United Kingdom) Matt Bell	1-12
(United States) United Autosports (United Kingdom) Red River Sport	22	Ligier JS P3	Nissan VK50VE	(United Kingdom) Bonamy Grimes	11-12
(United States) United Autosports (United Kingdom) Red River Sport	22	Ligier JS P3	Nissan VK50VE	(United Kingdom) Johnny Mowlem	11-12
(United States) United Autosports (United Kingdom) Red River Sport	32	Ligier JS P3	Nissan VK50VE	(United Kingdom) Sir Chris Hoy	11-12
(United States) United Autosports (United Kingdom) Red River Sport	32	Ligier JS P3	Nissan VK50VE	(United Kingdom) Sandy Mitchell	11-12
(United Kingdom) 360 Racing	6	Ligier JS P3	Nissan VK50VE	(Cyprus) Andy Demetriou	1-2
(United Kingdom) 360 Racing	6	Ligier JS P3	Nissan VK50VE	(United Kingdom) Bob Berridge	1-2
(United Kingdom) T-Sport	7	Ligier JS P3	Nissan VK50VE	(United Kingdom) Steve Tandy	1-2
(United Kingdom) T-Sport	7	Ligier JS P3	Nissan VK50VE	(India) Karun Chandhock	1-2
(United Kingdom) T-Sport	7	Ligier JS P3	Nissan VK50VE	(United Kingdom) Alex Kapadia	11-12
(United Kingdom) T-Sport	7	Ligier JS P3	Nissan VK50VE	(United Kingdom) Manhal Allos	11-12
(United Kingdom) Nielsen Racing (United Kingdom) Ecurie Ecosse with Nielsen Racing (Note: The No. 79 Nielsen Racing entry was in conjunction with Ecurie Ecosse.)	9	Ligier JS P3	Nissan VK50VE	(United Kingdom) Dean Gibbs	7-8
(United Kingdom) Nielsen Racing (United Kingdom) Ecurie Ecosse with Nielsen Racing	9	Ligier JS P3	Nissan VK50VE	(United Kingdom) Alex Kapadia	7-8
(United Kingdom) Nielsen Racing (United Kingdom) Ecurie Ecosse with Nielsen Racing	23	Ligier JS P3	Nissan VK50VE	(United Kingdom) Jason Rishover	1-3, 11-12
(United Kingdom) Nielsen Racing (United Kingdom) Ecurie Ecosse with Nielsen Racing	23	Ligier JS P3	Nissan VK50VE	(United Kingdom) Jamie Spence	1-4, 11-12
(United Kingdom) Nielsen Racing (United Kingdom) Ecurie Ecosse with Nielsen Racing	79	Ligier JS P3	Nissan VK50VE	(United Kingdom) Alasdair McCaig	1-12
(United Kingdom) Nielsen Racing (United Kingdom) Ecurie Ecosse with Nielsen Racing	79	Ligier JS P3	Nissan VK50VE	(United Kingdom) Colin Noble	1-12
(United Kingdom) Nielsen Racing (United Kingdom) Ecurie Ecosse with Nielsen Racing	888	Ligier JS P3	Nissan VK50VE	(Kuwait) Khaled Al Mudhaf	11-12
(United Kingdom) Nielsen Racing (United Kingdom) Ecurie Ecosse with Nielsen Racing	888	Ligier JS P3	Nissan VK50VE	(Netherlands) Michael Vergers	11-12
(United Kingdom) Tockwith Motorsport	26	Ligier JS P3	Nissan VK50VE	(United Kingdom) Richard Dean	1-6
(United Kingdom) Tockwith Motorsport	26	Ligier JS P3	Nissan VK50VE	(United Kingdom) Sarah Moore	1-6
(United Kingdom) G-Cat Racing	28	Ligier JS P3	Nissan VK50VE	(United Kingdom) Paul Bailey	1-6
(United Kingdom) G-Cat Racing	28	Ligier JS P3	Nissan VK50VE	(United Kingdom) Andy Schulz	1-6
(United Kingdom) Douglas Motorsport	72	Ligier JS P3	Nissan VK50VE	(United Kingdom) Mike Newbould	1-4, 9-12
(United Kingdom) Douglas Motorsport	72	Ligier JS P3	Nissan VK50VE	(Australia) Thomas Randle	1-4, 9-10
(United Kingdom) Douglas Motorsport	72	Ligier JS P3	Nissan VK50VE	(South Africa) Callan O'Keeffe	7-8, 11-12
(United Kingdom) Speedworks Motorsport	96	Ligier JS P3	Nissan VK50VE	(United Kingdom) Jack Butel	1-12
(United Kingdom) Speedworks Motorsport	96	Ligier JS P3	Nissan VK50VE	(United Kingdom) Dean Gibbs	1-4
(United Kingdom) Speedworks Motorsport	96	Ligier JS P3	Nissan VK50VE	(United Kingdom) Scott Mansell	5-6
(United Kingdom) Speedworks Motorsport	96	Ligier JS P3	Nissan VK50VE	(United Kingdom) Andrew Bentley	7-8
(United Kingdom) Speedworks Motorsport	96	Ligier JS P3	Nissan VK50VE	(United Kingdom) Devon Modell	9-10

== Races ==
The revised 12-race calendar was released on Friday 7 December 2016.

Round		Circuit	Pole position	Winners
1	R1	(United Kingdom) Donington Park (National)	(United Kingdom) No. 28 G-Cat Racing	(United Kingdom) No. 79 Nielsen Racing
1	R1	(United Kingdom) Donington Park (National)	(United Kingdom) Andy Schulz	(United Kingdom) Alasdair McCaig (United Kingdom) Colin Noble
1	R2	(United Kingdom) Donington Park (National)	(United Kingdom) No. 28 G-Cat Racing	(United Kingdom) No. 79 Nielsen Racing
1	R2	(United Kingdom) Donington Park (National)	(United Kingdom) Andy Schulz	(United Kingdom) Alasdair McCaig (United Kingdom) Colin Noble
2	R3	(United Kingdom) Brands Hatch GP	(United States) No. 3 United Autosports	(United States) No. 3 United Autosports
2	R3	(United Kingdom) Brands Hatch GP	(United Kingdom) Tony Wells	(United Kingdom) Tony Wells (United Kingdom) Matt Bell
2	R4	(United Kingdom) Brands Hatch GP	(United Kingdom) No. 23 Nielsen Racing	(United Kingdom) No. 79 Nielsen Racing
2	R4	(United Kingdom) Brands Hatch GP	(United Kingdom) Jamie Spence	(United Kingdom) Alasdair McCaig (United Kingdom) Colin Noble
3	R5	(Belgium) Spa Francorchamps	(United Kingdom) No. 79 Nielsen Racing	(United States) No. 3 United Autosports
3	R5	(Belgium) Spa Francorchamps	(United Kingdom) Alasdair McCaig	(United Kingdom) Tony Wells (United Kingdom) Matt Bell
3	R6	(Belgium) Spa Francorchamps	(United States) No. 3 United Autosports	(United Kingdom) No. 79 Nielsen Racing
3	R6	(Belgium) Spa Francorchamps	(United Kingdom) Tony Wells	(United Kingdom) Alasdair McCaig (United Kingdom) Colin Noble
4	R7	(United Kingdom) Silverstone Circuit (GP)	(United States) No. 2 United Autosports	(United Kingdom) No. 79 Nielsen Racing
4	R7	(United Kingdom) Silverstone Circuit (GP)	(United Kingdom) Christian England	(United Kingdom) Alasdair McCaig (United Kingdom) Colin Noble
4	R8	(United Kingdom) Silverstone Circuit (GP)	(United States) No. 3 United Autosports	(United States) No. 3 United Autosports
4	R8	(United Kingdom) Silverstone Circuit (GP)	(United Kingdom) Tony Wells	(United Kingdom) Tony Wells (United Kingdom) Matt Bell
5	R9	(United Kingdom) Snetterton Circuit (300)	(United States) No. 2 United Autosports	(United Kingdom) No. 79 Nielsen Racing
5	R9	(United Kingdom) Snetterton Circuit (300)	(United Kingdom) Christian England	(United Kingdom) Alasdair McCaig (United Kingdom) Colin Noble
5	R10	(United Kingdom) Snetterton Circuit (300)	(United States) No. 2 United Autosports	(United States) No. 2 United Autosports
5	R10	(United Kingdom) Snetterton Circuit (300)	(United Kingdom) Christian England	(United Kingdom) Christian England (United Kingdom) Andrew Evans
6	R11	(United Kingdom) Donington Park (GP)	(United States) No. 2 United Autosports	(United States) No. 3 United Autosports
6	R11	(United Kingdom) Donington Park (GP)	(United Kingdom) Christian England	(United Kingdom) Tony Wells (United Kingdom) Matt Bell
6	R12	(United Kingdom) Donington Park (GP)	(United States) No. 2 United Autosports	(United Kingdom) No. 96 Speedworks Motorsport
6	R12	(United Kingdom) Donington Park (GP)	(United Kingdom) Christian England	(United Kingdom) Jack Butel

== Table ==
Pos	Team	1	2	3	4	5	6	7	8	9	10	11	12	Total
1	No. 79 Nielsen Racing	25	26	19	25	19	26	26	19	25	15	8	DNF	234
2	No. 3 United Autosports	6	18	26	18	26	19	18	25	DNF	12	26	18	212
3	No. 96 Speedworks Motorsport	1	10	8	10	15	15	10	12	18	18	12	25	154
4	No. 2 United Autosports	8	DNF		6	12	8	16	16	16	26	11	12	132
5	No. 72 Douglas Motorsport	13	8	12	15					13	11			73
6	No. 23 Nielsen Racing	18	DNF	15	DNF	DNF	DNF					15	15	64
6	No. 26 Tockwith Motorsport	10	15	6	12	10	10							63
7	No. 28 G-Cat Racing	5	5	10	8	8	12							48
9	No. 32 United Autosports											18	10	28
10	No. 7 T-Sport	15	12											27
11	No. 9 Nielsen Racing							12	10					22
=12	No. 888 Nielsen Racing											6	4	10
=12	No. 22 United Autosports											4	6	10
=12	No. 7 T-Sport											2	8	10
15	No. 6 360 Racing	2	6											8

Points are scored:

Position	1	2	3	4	5	6	7	8	9	10	Pole	FL
Points	25	18	15	12	10	8	6	4	2	1	1	1

With bonus points for pole position and fastest lap.
