= Ligier JS P3 =

French sports car prototype

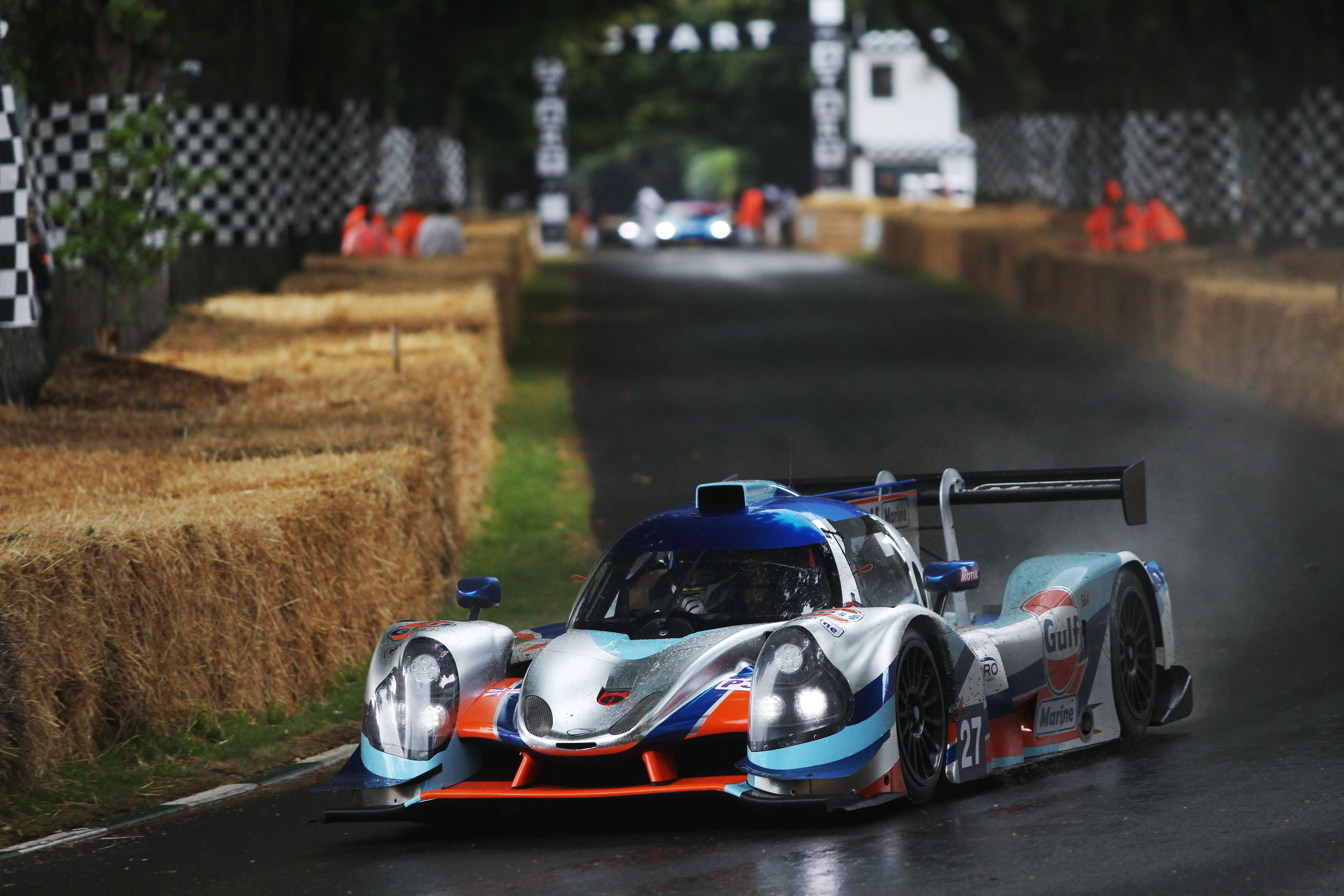
- The No. 27 United Autosports JS P3 at the 2019 Goodwood Festival of Speed
- Category: LMP3
- Designer: Nicolas Clémençon
- Successor: Ligier JS P320

Technical specifications
- Chassis: Carbon monocoque
- Suspension (front): Double wishbone
- Suspension (rear): Double wishbone
- Length: 4,605 mm (181.3 in)
- Width: 1,900 mm (74.8 in)
- Wheelbase: 2,860 mm (112.6 in)
- Engine: Nissan VK50DE 5.0L V8 N/A Rear-mid
- Transmission: XTrac 1152 6-speed sequential
- Power: 420 hp (313 kW; 426 PS)
- Weight: 930 kg (2,050 lb)
- Fuel: Various
- Lubricants: Various
- Brakes: 6-piston Brembo 14 in steel disks
- Tyres: Dunlop, Michelin, Pirelli, Continental, Giti

Competition history
- Notable entrants: (United States) United Autosports (France) OAK Racing (France) GRAFF Racing (United States) Tequila Patron ESM
- Debut: 2015 4 Hours of Estoril
| Races | Wins | Titles |
|---|---|---|
| 242 | 180 | 17 |
- Teams' Championships: 7 (2016–2018 European Le Mans Series), (2015–2016, 2016–2017, 2017–2018 Asian Le Mans Series), (2019 Ultimate Cup Series Proto)
- Drivers' Championships: 10 (2016–2018 European Le Mans Series), (2015–2016, 2016–2017, 2017 GT & Prototype Challenge), (2017 British LMP3 Cup), (2017–2018 Asian Le Mans Series), (2019 Ultimate Cup Series Proto), (2023 Masters Endurance Legends Prototype)

The Ligier JS P3 is an LMP3 Le Mans Prototype. It was created by Onroak Automotive, and named in partnership with former French driver Guy Ligier. It was built to meet ACO LMP3 standards, and is active in various LMP3 championships worldwide, such as the European Le Mans Series, IMSA Prototype Challenge, and the Asian Le Mans Series. The car has proven to be immensely popular in the category, with over 100 cars being produced since 2015. It has also proved to be one of the most successful prototypes in the class, with a total of 103 overall wins and class victories from 132 races entered by the car. It was succeeded in 2020 by the Ligier JS P320 when new LMP3 regulations came into place in 2020.

== Development ==
In 2014, the ACO announced a new category of Le Mans Prototypes, known as LMP3, which would replace the previous Le Mans Prototype Challenge (LMPC) class in 2015. The number of constructors was limited in the class, with licenses being issued to 6 manufacturers, namely ADESS, Ligier (Onroak Automotive), Ave/Riley, Norma, Dome, as well as Ginetta. Nissan was later announced to be supplying the spec engine, the VK50VE producing 420 hp (313 kW; 426 PS). The car was launched on 2 February 2015. It was designed primarily in Computational Fluid Dynamics (CFD) using Exa Corporation's PowerFLOW Simulation Software.

Compared to its rivals in the LMP3 class, it has been known to have a lower top speed through speed traps, but is known to have an advantage in the corners.

== Competition history ==
=== 2015 ===
On its debut at the 2015 4 Hours of Estoril, the car finished well, scoring a podium finish at the hands of Graff Racing.

=== 2016 ===
United Autosports clinched the LMP3 Teams championship with the car, while in the V de V Endurance Series, Inter Europol Competition clinched the LMP3 teams championship.

== Gallery ==
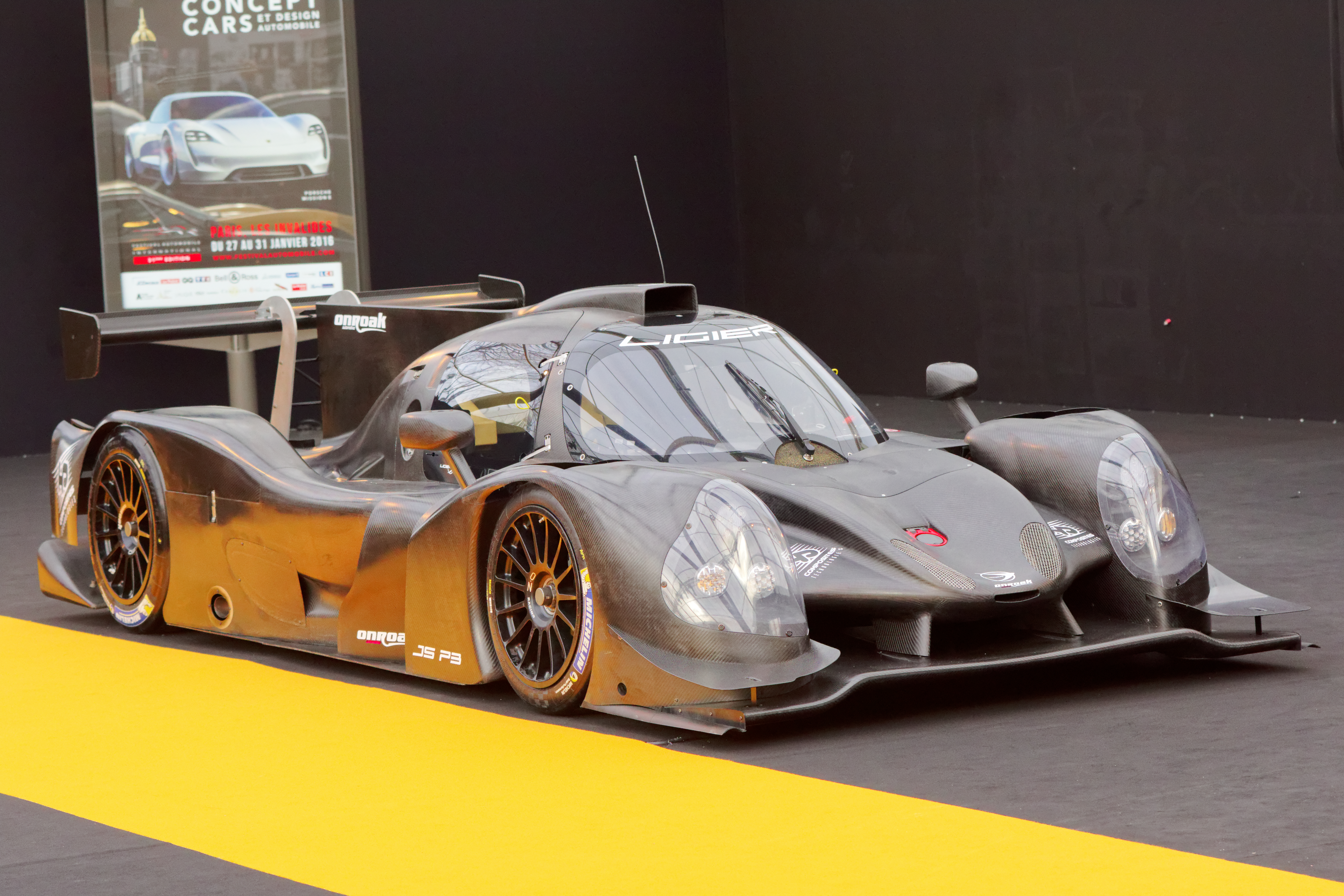
A prototype of the JS P3 at the 2016 Festival Automobile International

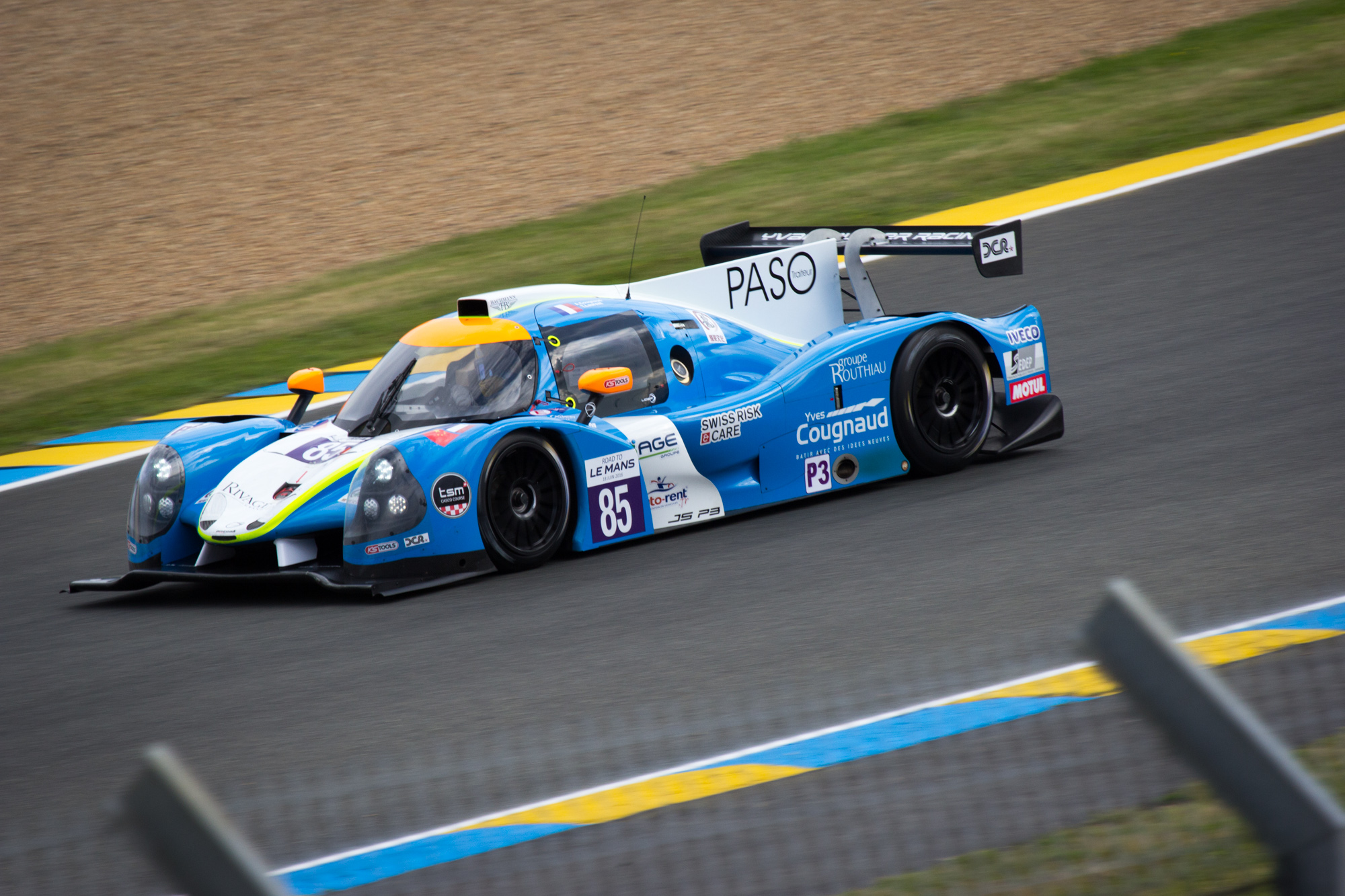
The No. 85 car entered by DC Racing at the 2016 Road to Le Mans

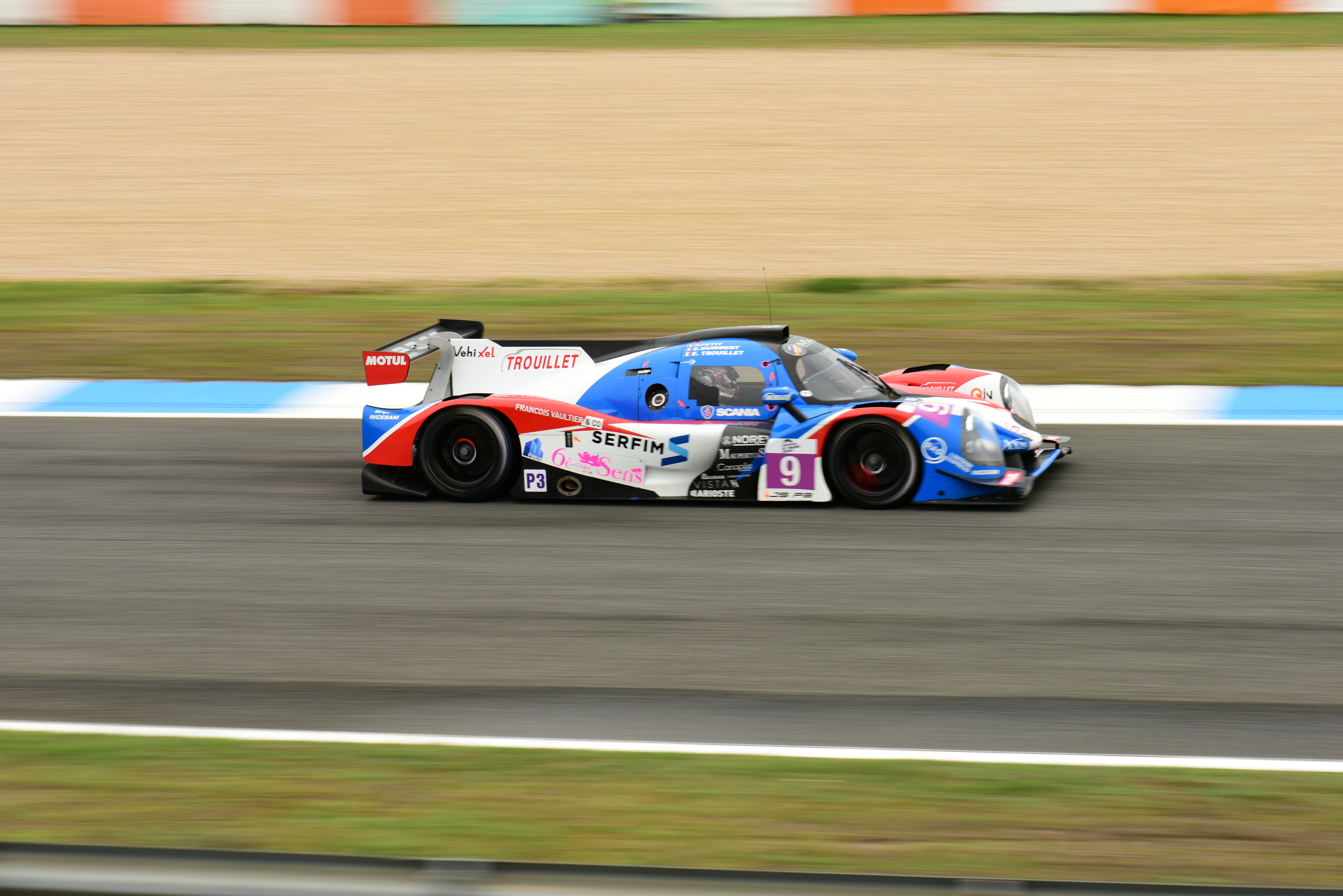
The No. 9 car entered by Graff Racing took third at the 2016 4 Hours of Estoril

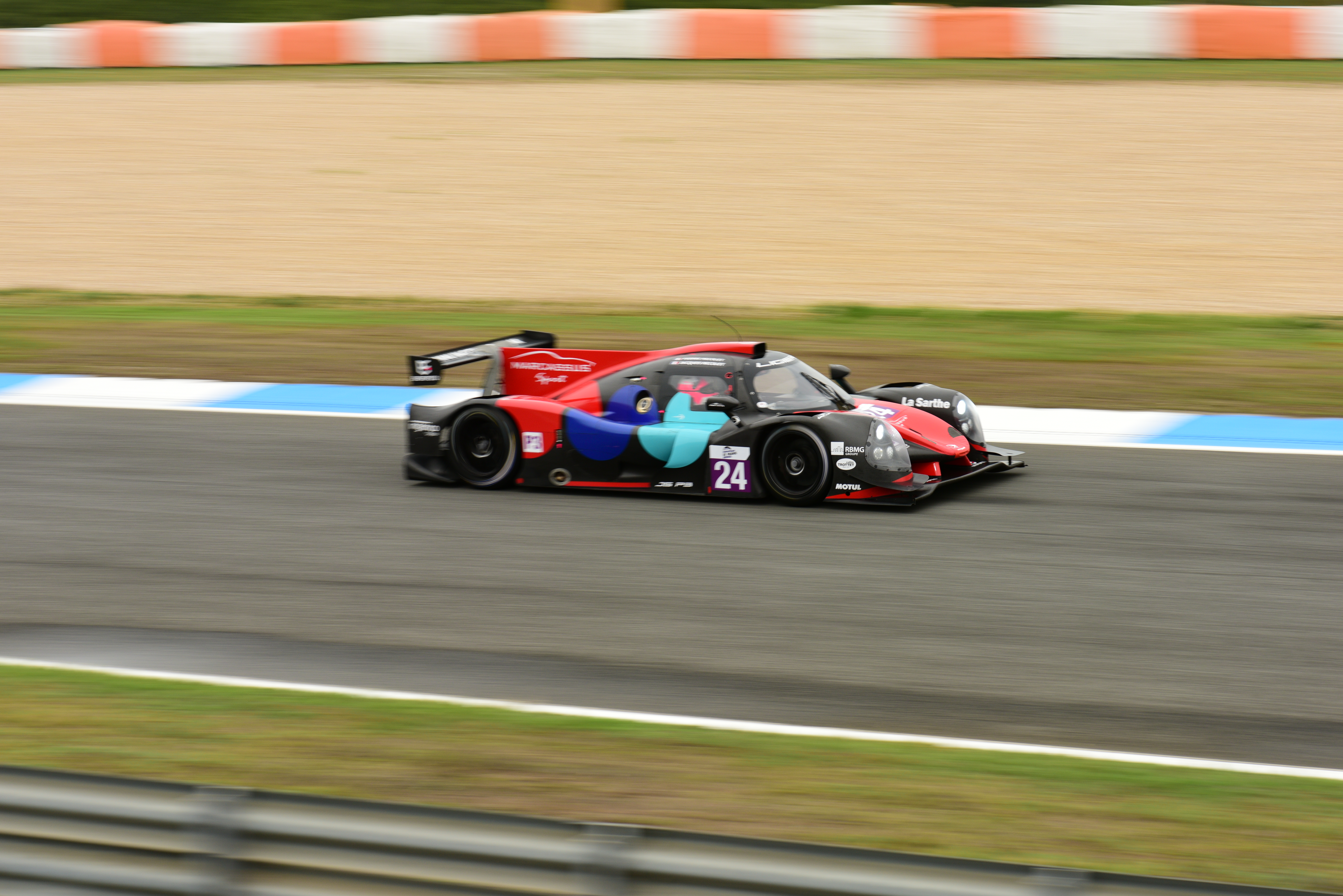
The No. 24 car entered by OAK Racing at the 2016 4 Hours of Estoril

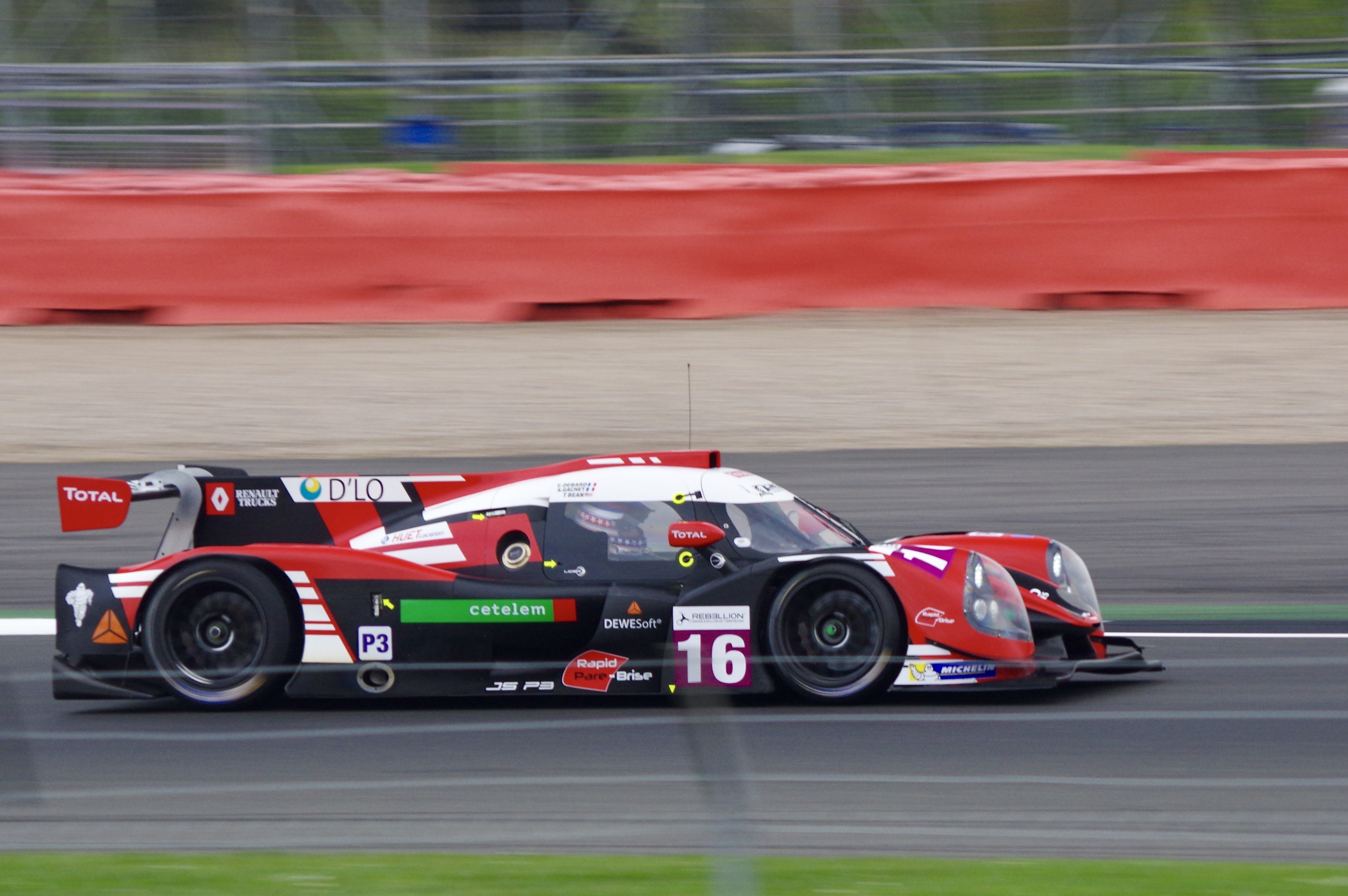
Theo Bean driving the No. 16 car of Panis Barthez Competition at the 2017 4 Hours of Silverstone

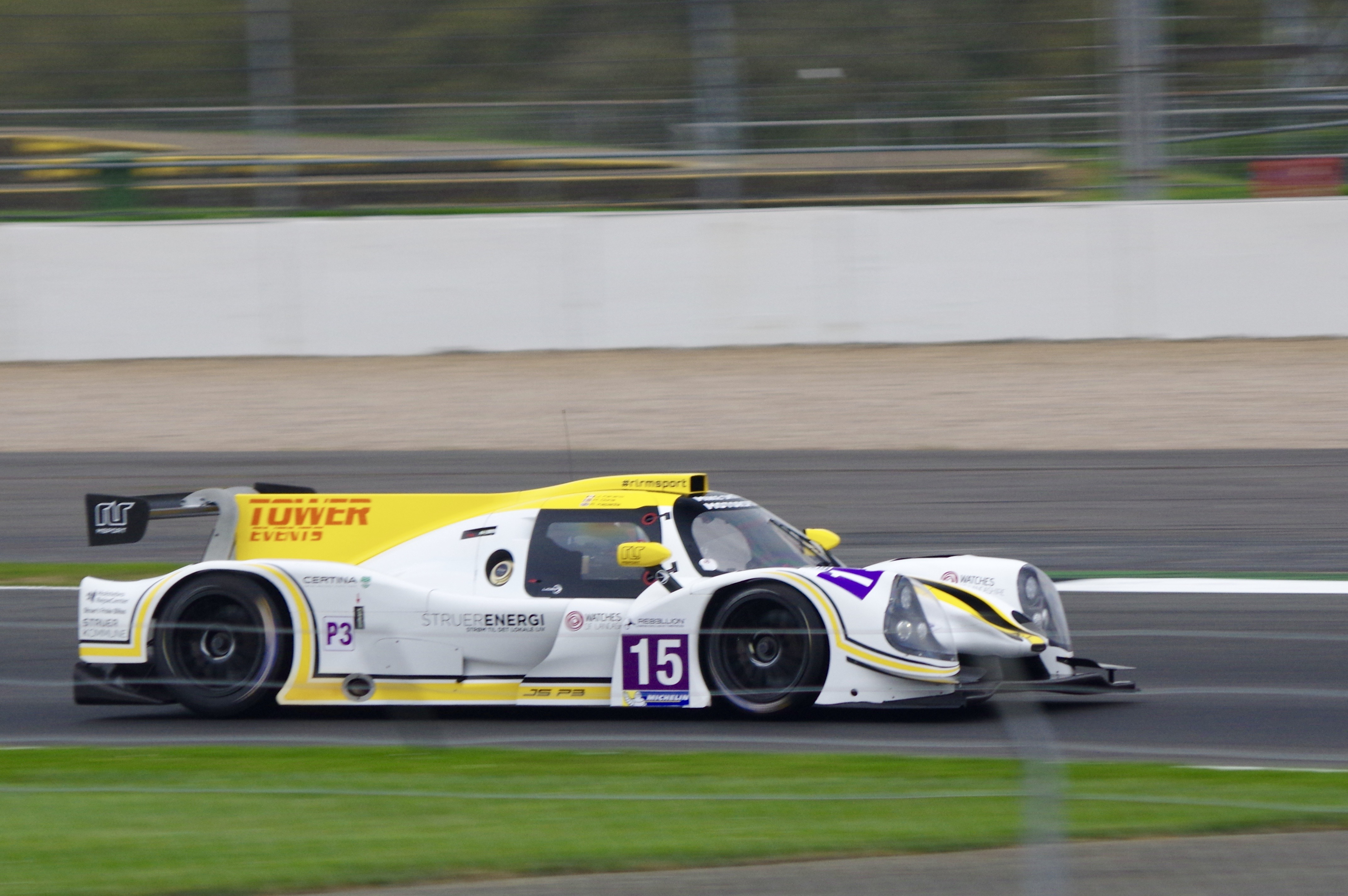
The No. 15 car entered by RLR MSport at the 2017 4 Hours of Silverstone

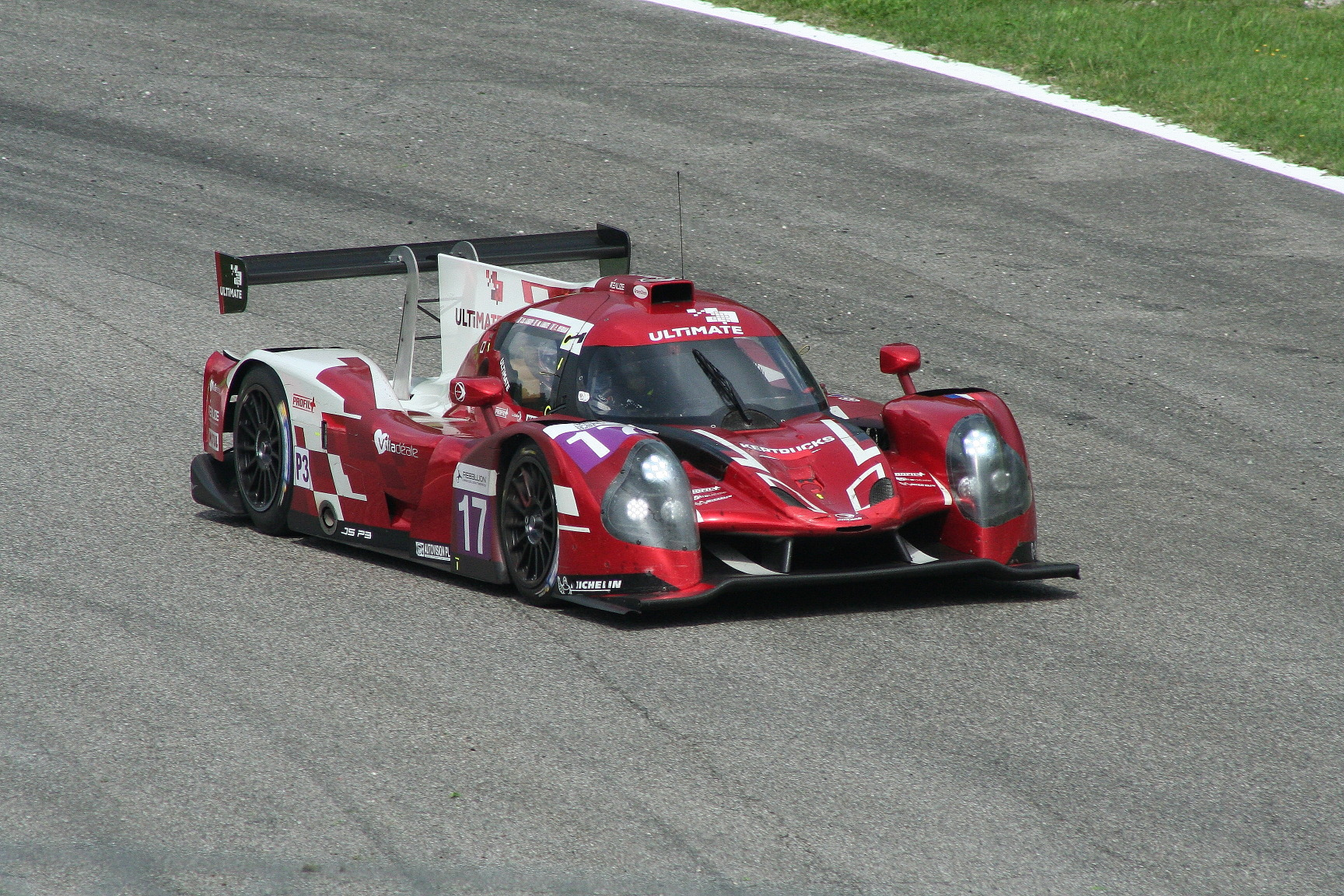
The No. 17 car entered by Ultimate at the 2017 4 Hours of Monza

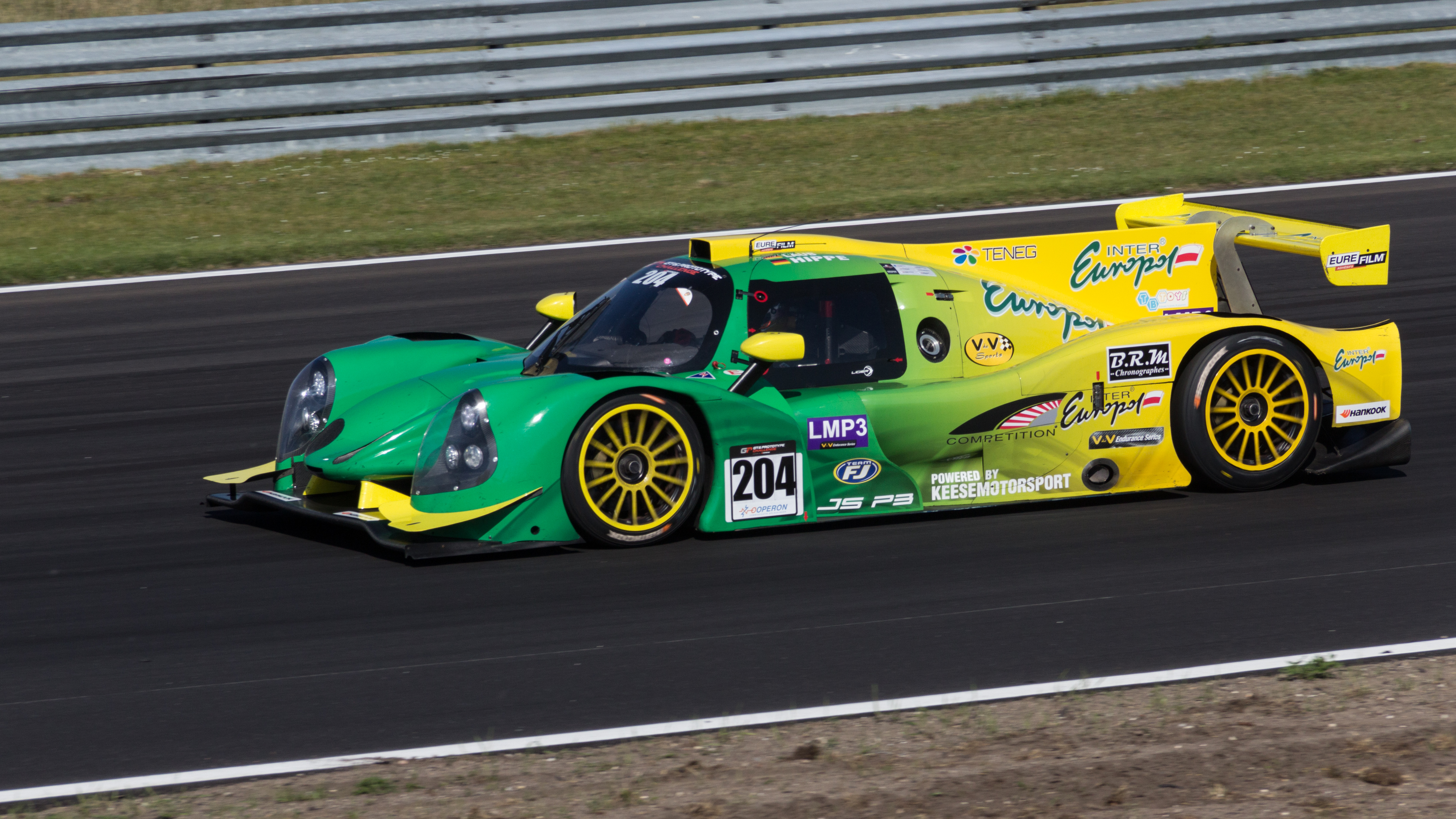
The No. 204 car entered by Inter Europol Competition at the 2017 GT & Prototype Challenge in Zandvoort Circuit

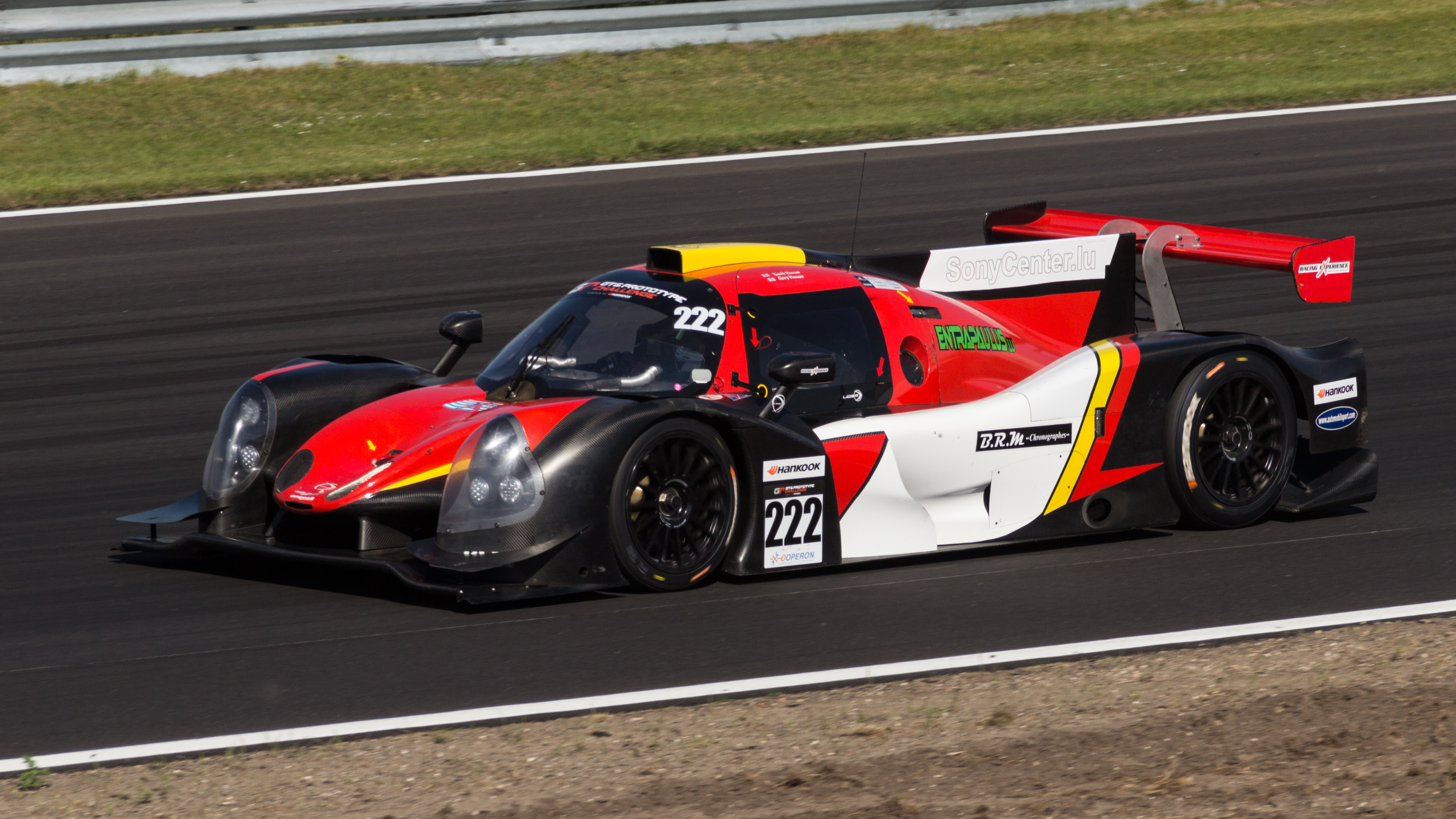
David Hauser driving the No. 222 car of Racing Experience at the 2017 GT & Prototype Challenge in Zandvoort

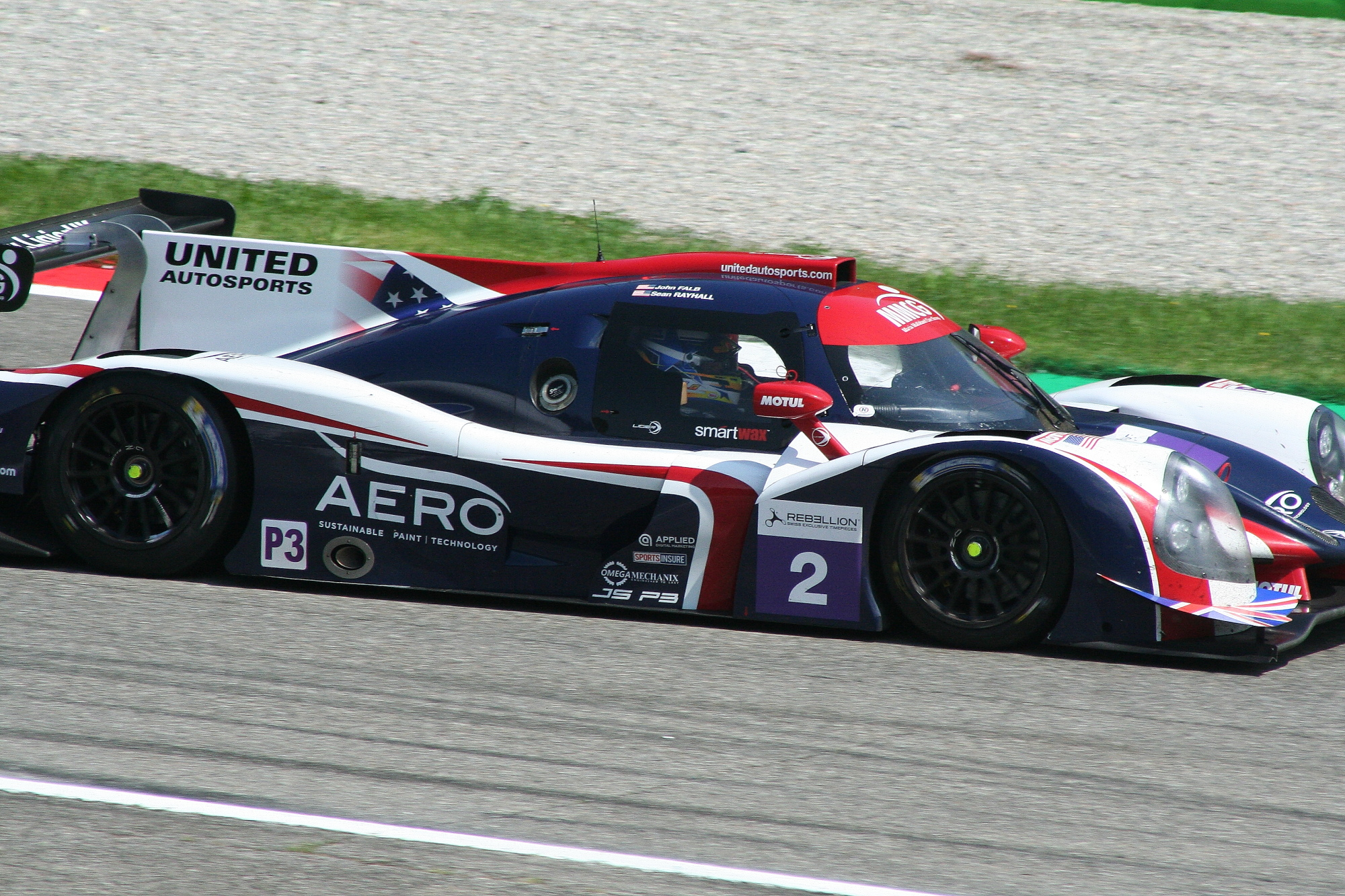
John Falb driving the No. 2 car entered by United Autosports at the 2018 4 Hours of Monza

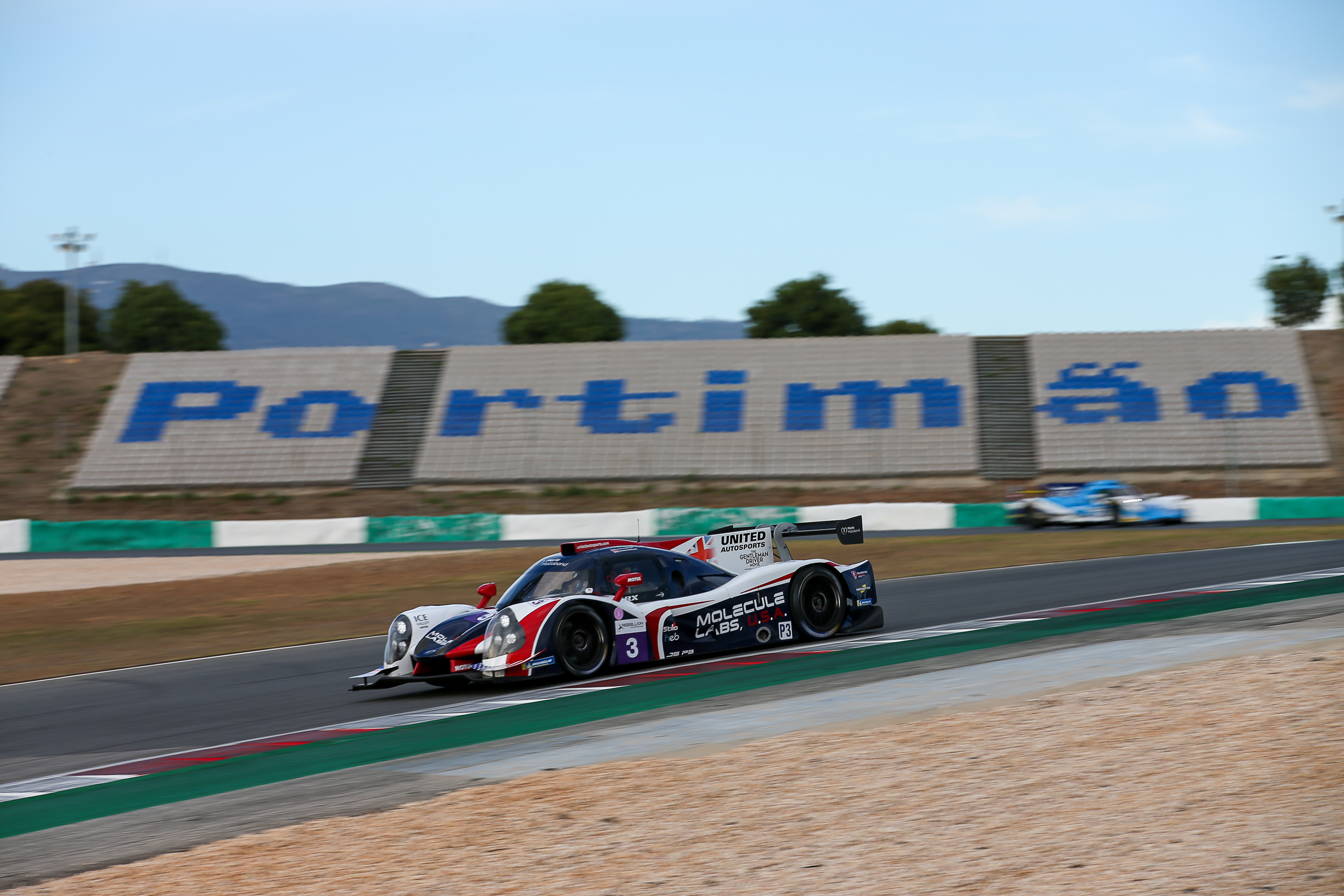
The No. 3 car entered by United Autosports at the 2019 4 Hours of Portimão
