= Nielsen Racing =

British racing team

(United Kingdom) Nielsen Racing
- Founded: 2014
- Founder(s): David 'Sven' Thompson
- Base: Corby, Northamptonshire, United Kingdom
- Team principal(s): David 'Sven' Thompson
- Current series: European Le Mans Series; Asian Le Mans Series; Le Mans Cup; Ligier European Series; Euroformula Open Championship
- Former series: British LMP3 Cup; IMSA Prototype Challenge; Prototype Cup Germany; Ultimate Cup Series
- Current drivers: European Le Mans Series: 24.; (Australia) Jack Doohan; (Israel) Roy Nissany; (United Kingdom) Edward Pearson; 27.; (Australia) James Allen; (Greece) Kriton Lendoudis; (United Kingdom) Alex Quinn; Le Mans Cup; 4.; (France) Jules Caranta; (South Africa) Mikaeel Pitamber; 7.; (United Kingdom) Matt Bell; (United States) Wyatt Brichacek; (United Kingdom) Alfie Briggs
- Teams' Championships: 5 (British LMP3 Cup 2017, 2018 LMP3, Asian Le Mans Series 2019–20 LMP3, 2022 LMP2, Le Mans Cup 2021 LMP3)
- Drivers' Championships: 5 (British LMP3 Cup 2017, 2018 LMP3, Asian Le Mans Series 2019–20 LMP3, 2022 LMP2, Le Mans Cup 2021 LMP3)
- Website: Nielsen Racing

Nielsen Racing is a British sports car racing team. Born in 2014, the outfit started off in Radicals before progressing to LMP3 in 2017 and LMP2 in 2020, making its debut at that year's 24 Hours of Le Mans. It has won titles in the Asian Le Mans Series and Le Mans Cup, and currently operates a two-car programme in the European Le Mans Series. In 2025 it expanded to single-seater racing by entering the Euroformula Open Championship, and in 2026 rebranded that operation as Northstar Racing.

The team was founded by former Greaves Motorsport engineer David 'Sven' Thompson in partnership with Nielsen Chemicals, a manufacturer of automotive cleaning products.

== History ==
=== 2014–2017 ===
Nielsen Racing made its racing debut in 2014, in the Radical Middle East Cup. In 2017, Nielsen partnered with Ecurie Ecosse to compete in the Le Mans Cup and the British LMP3 Cup. Drivers, Alasdair McCaig and Colin Noble, won six races on the way to becoming the 2017 British LMP3 Cup champions.

=== 2018 ===
The following year, the team stepped up and entered into the 2018 European Le Mans Series, again running in conjunction with Ecurie Ecosse. They finished fourth in the LMP3 class with drivers Alex Kapadia, Colin Noble and Christian Stubbe Olsen, scoring three second place finishes. The team also won the 2018 British LMP3 Cup for a second consecutive year. Nielsen made its Asian Le Mans Series debut in the 2018-19 season in LMP3, with the No. 79 entry finishing in third.

=== 2019 ===
In 2019, Nielsen entered two cars into the European Le Mans Series, a Norma M30 for Colin Noble and Anthony Wells, and a Ligier JS P3 for James Littlejohn, Nobuya Yamanaka and Nicholas Adcock. The No. 7 entry finished in fifth, with one podium, while the No. 8 entry finished in ninth. In addition, they also ran another Norma M30 for Noble and Wells in the Le Mans Cup. They finished on the podium five times to place third in the LMP3 championship. Nielsen returned to the Asian Le Mans Series with two Norma M30 chassis, the No.2 for Noble and Wells, and the No. 3 for Charles Crews, Garett Grist and Rob Hodes. The No. 2 secured the LMP3 championship after scoring three podium finishes, including a win at The Bend Motorsport Park. By virtue of winning the championship, Nielsen Racing received an automatic invitation into the 2020 24 Hours of Le Mans in either the LMP2 or LMGTE Am categories.

=== 2020 ===
Nielsen made its first venture into North American racing with an entry into the 2020 IMSA Prototype Challenge with drivers, Garett Grist and Rob Hodes. For the 2020 European Le Mans Series, the team fielded two Duqueine M30 – D08, retaining the same lineup from the Asian Le Mans Series. Across both entries, there were three retirements and only one podium, with the No. 7 finishing in tenth and the No. 10 finishing in eighth. In the Le Mans Cup, Noble and Wells would again partner together scoring two podiums and a win at Portimão, to finish in fifth place in LMP3. Grist and Hodes placed in tenth, with a best finish of fourth at Monza. The team competed in its first 24 Hours of Le Mans in 2020. They would chose to compete in an Oreca 07-Gibson, with drivers Garett Grist, Alex Kapadia and Tony Wells. The team qualified 19th in LMP2, 24th overall, with a time of 3:30.897. Nielsen finished 16th in class, 28th overall, 32 laps down from the LMP2 winner after making contact in the fourth hour with the No. 16 G-Drive by Algarve Pro Aurus 01-Gibson of Nick Tandy.

=== 2021 ===
Two cars were entered into the LMP3 class in the 2021 Asian Le Mans Series with two Ligier JS P320 for Matt Bell and Rodrigo Sales in the No. 8, and Colin Noble and Anthony Wells in the No. 9. The No. 9 entry finished third with a win in race 1 of the 4 Hours of Abu Dhabi, while the No. 8 finished fifth with two podiums. Two Ligier JS P320 chassis were entered into the 2021 European Le Mans Series for drivers Nicholas Adcock, Max Koebolt and Austin McCusker in the No. 6 and Noble and wells in the No. 7. It was a largely mediocre campaign with a best finish of fifth at the Red Bull Ring, resulted in a 13th and 14th place classification. Le Mans Cup saw the full season entry of Noble and Wells take home the Drivers' and Teams' championships, after winning twice at Circuit Paul Ricard and Le Mans.

=== 2022 ===
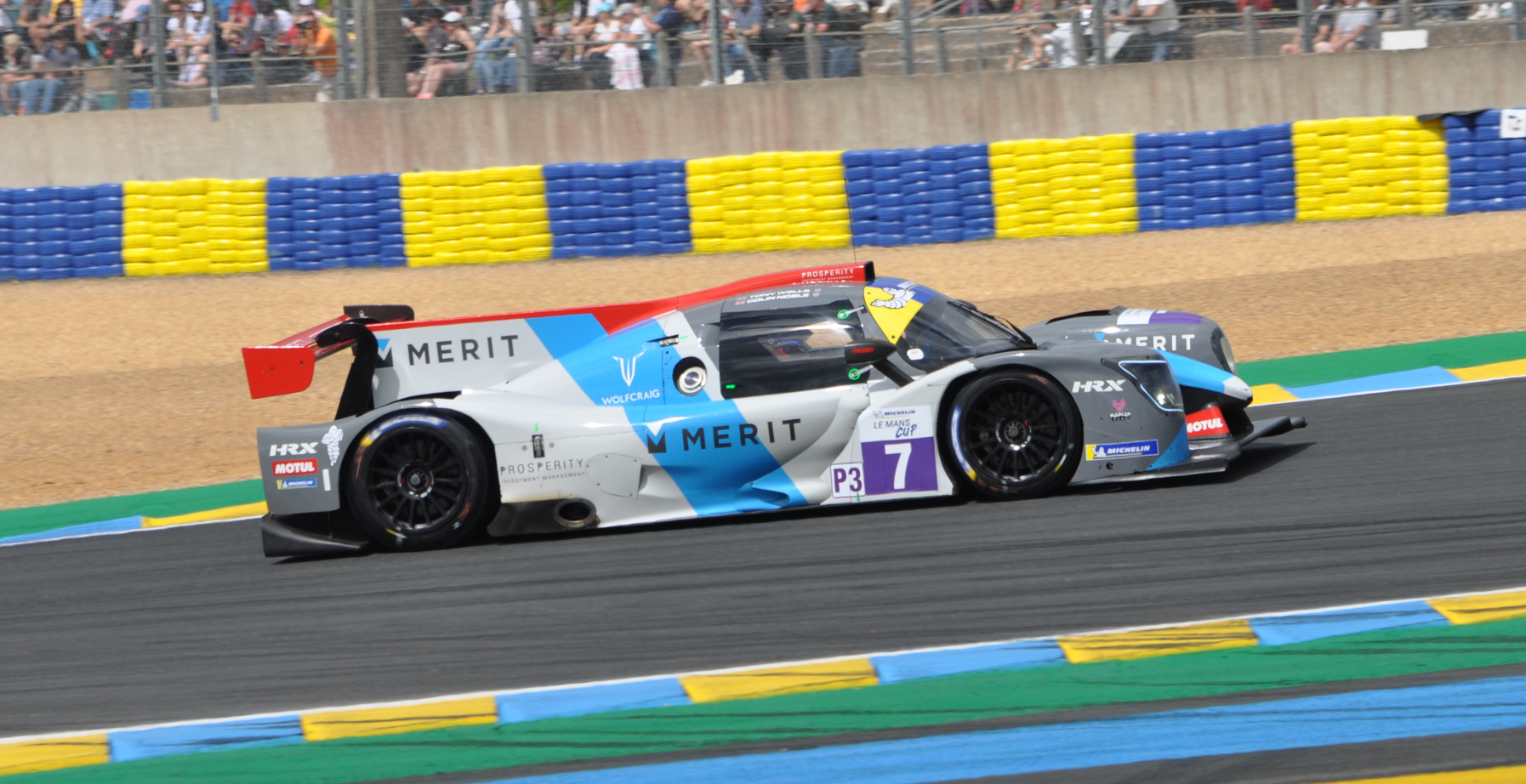
Nielsen Racing's Ligier JS P320 of Tony Wells and Colin Noble in 2022.

Nielsen stepped up to run a Oreca 07-Gibson in the Asian Le Mans Series for Matt Bell, Ben Hanley and Rodrigo Sales, while also continuing to run a Ligier JS P320 for Colin Noble and Anthony Wells. The LMP2 entry swept all four races of the season winning the championship after race 1 of the 4 Hours of Abu Dhabi. The team also entered in the Prototype Cup Germany season opener at Spa-Francorchamps for Matt Bell and John Melsom. Bell, Hanley and Sales returned for the European Le Mans Series in the No. 24 LMP2 Pro-Am class, Oreca 07-Gibson, with an additional LMP3 entry for James Littlejohn and Anthony Wells. The No. 24 placed third in the LMP2 Pro-Am championship with four podiums, including a win at Monza, while the No. 7 LMP3 car was tenth with a podium at Spa. Two cars, a Duqueine M30 - D08 for Bell and John Melsom, and a Ligier JS P320 for Noble and Wells, competed in the Le Mans Cup that year. In the LMP3 championship they finished 19th and third respectively. As the Asian Le Mans Series LMP2 champions, Nielsen was automatically invited to the 2022 24 Hours of Le Mans. They entered into the LMP2 Pro-Am subcategory with AsLMS and ELMS drivers Bell, Hanley and Sales. Hanley set a time of 3:32.956 in Qualifying, which was good for LMP2 Pro-Am pole position. Nielsen finished 20th overall, second in class, one lap down from the class winners after suffering multiple problems during the race.

=== 2023 ===
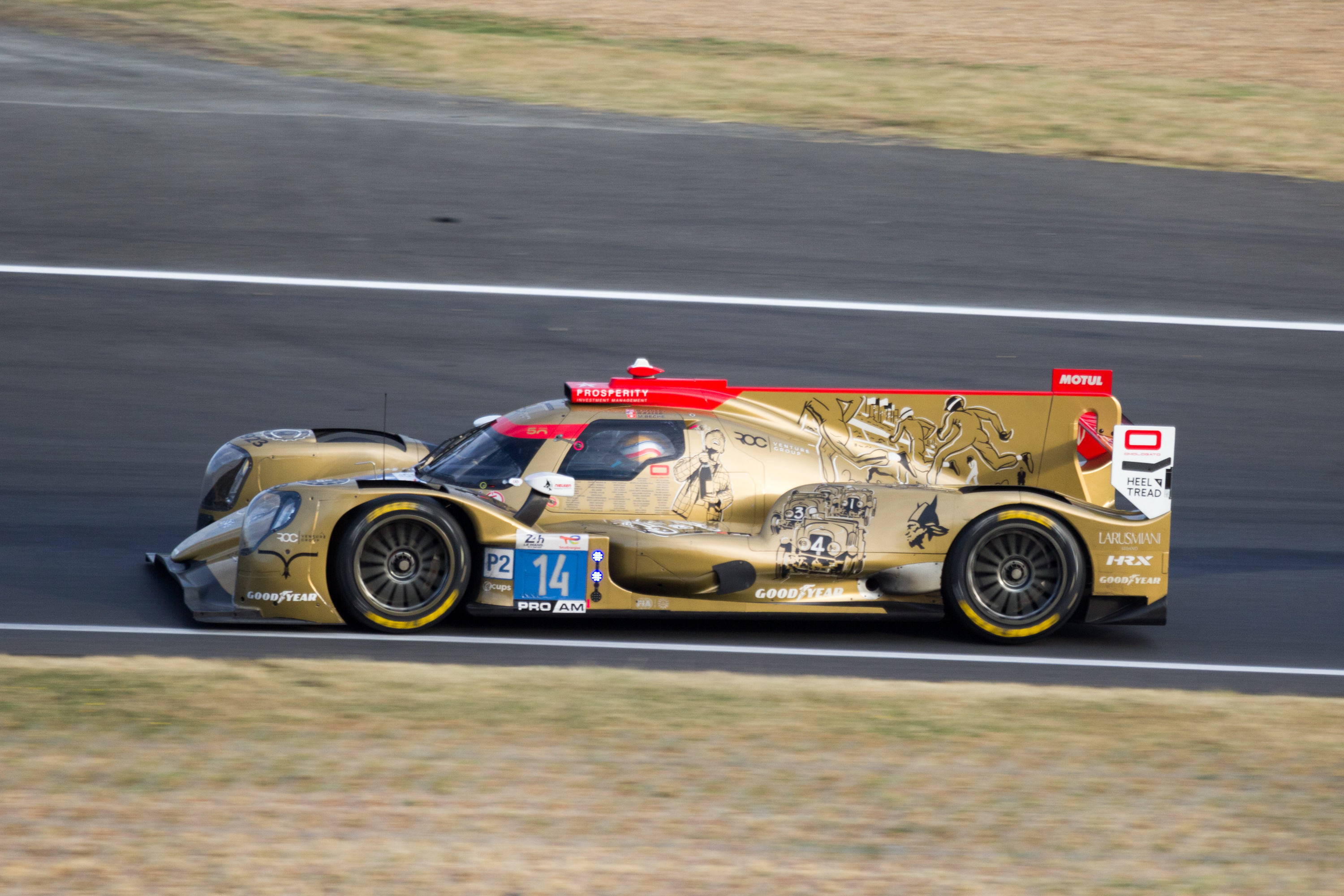
Nielsen Racing's special-liveried Oreca 07 at the 2023 24 Hours of Le Mans.

Nielsen entered the Asian Le Mans Series as the defending champions and added Mathias Beche to join Ben Hanley and Rodrigo Sales to their No. 24 LMP2 entry. Matt Bell partnered with Tony Wells in the No. 4 LMP3 Ligier JS P320. The No. 24 finished sixth in LMP2 while the No. 4 LMP3 squad won a race at Abu Dhabi to finish in third. The European Le Mans Series was a two-car campaign for Beche, Hanley and Sales in the No. 24 LMP2 Pro-Am class and Ryan Harper-Ellam and Anthony Wells in the No. 7 LMP3 class. The No. 24 finished fourth with three podiums on the season while the No. 7 finished in 11th. A Duqueine M30 - D08 for Bell and Melsom, and a Ligier JS P320 for Josh Skelton and Wells were entered into the Le Mans Cup. Bell and Melsom won two races to place in fourth while Skelton and wells were in ninth. Beche, Hanley and Sales also teamed up for the 24 Hours of Le Mans. They would DNF after 18 laps when Sales crashed at the Dunlop Chicane.

=== 2024 ===
The team entered the 2023–24 Asian Le Mans Series season with Alex García, Ian Loggie, Ferdinand Habsburg and Will Stevens, who filled in for Habsburg at Dubai. A second Oreca 07-Gibson was brought for the last two rounds for drivers Matt Bell, Patrick Liddy and Blake McDonald. It was an unsuccessful season, with a best finish of seventh at Abu Dhabi for the full season No. 24 entry. Nielsen entered two Oreca 07-Gibsons into the European Le Mans Series, the No. 24 LMP2 Pro-Am car for John Falb, Colin Noble, Albert Costa (rounds 1–3) and Nick Yelloly (rounds 4–6), and the No. 27 LMP2 for Will Stevens, David Heinemeier Hansson, Nico Pino, Benjamin Pedersen and Gabriel Aubry filling in at Portimão. The No. 27 only finished in the points one, at Mugello, scoring one point to finish last in the LMP2 class standings. The Pro-Am, No. 24 squad finished on the podium twice at Barcelona and Portimão, finishing fifth. Nielsen also had Wayne Boyd and Anthony Wells entered into the LMP3 class of the Le Mans Cup, scoring a podium at Mugello and classifying sixth in the standings. The team entered the 2024 24 Hours of Le Mans with Hansson, Fabio Scherer and IndyCar driver, Kyffin Simpson, in the LMP2 class. They qualified 33rd overall and tenth in class with a time of 3:34.794. Nielsen finished the race 25th overall and 11th in category, completing 291 laps.

== Racing record ==
=== Complete European Le Mans Series results ===
(key) (Races in bold indicate pole position; races in italics indicate fastest lap)

Year	Entrant	Class	Chassis	Engine	No.	Drivers	1	2	3	4	5	6	Pos.	Pts.
2018	(United Kingdom) Ecurie Ecosse/Nielsen	LMP3	Ligier JS P3	Nissan VK50VE 5.0 L V8	7	(United Kingdom) Alex Kapadia (United Kingdom) Colin Noble (Denmark) Christian Stubbe Olsen	LEC; 9	MNZ; 10	RBR; 2	SIL; 2	SPA; 9	ALG; 2	4th	58
2019	(United Kingdom) Nielsen Racing	LMP3	Norma M30	Nissan VK50VE 5.0 L V8	7	(United Kingdom) Colin Noble (United Kingdom) Anthony Wells	LEC; 5	MNZ; 7	CAT; 4	SIL; 5	SPA; 3	ALG; 5	5th	63
2019	(United Kingdom) Nielsen Racing	LMP3	Ligier JS P3	Nissan VK50VE 5.0 L V8	8	(United Kingdom) James Littlejohn (Japan) Nobuya Yamanaka 1–2, 4 (United Kingdom) Nicholas Adcock 3, 5–6	LEC; 14	MNZ; Ret	CAT; 6	SIL; 9	SPA; 9	ALG; 4	9th	24.5
2020	(United Kingdom) Nielsen Racing	LMP3	Duqueine M30 – D08	Nissan VK56DE 5.6 L V8	7	(United Kingdom) Colin Noble (United Kingdom) Anthony Wells	LEC; Ret	SPA; 2	LEC; Ret	MNZ; 8	ALG; 11		10th	22.5
2020	(United Kingdom) Nielsen Racing	LMP3	Duqueine M30 – D08	Nissan VK56DE 5.6 L V8	10	(United States) Charles Crews (Canada) Garett Grist (United States) Rob Hodes	LEC; 8	SPA; Ret	LEC; 5	MNZ; 6	ALG; 5		8th	32
2021	(United Kingdom) Nielsen Racing	LMP3	Ligier JS P320	Nissan VK56DE 5.6 L V8	6	(United Kingdom) Nicholas Adcock (Netherlands) Max Koebolt (United States) Austin McCusker	CAT; 6	RBR; 10	LEC; 12	MNZ; 12	SPA; 9	ALG; 12	14th	12.5
2021	(United Kingdom) Nielsen Racing	LMP3	Ligier JS P320	Nissan VK56DE 5.6 L V8	7	(United Kingdom) Colin Noble (United Kingdom) Anthony Wells	CAT; 9	RBR; 11	LEC; 5	MNZ; NC	SPA; 10	ALG; 14	13th	14
2022	(United Kingdom) Nielsen Racing	LMP3	Ligier JS P320	Nissan VK56DE 5.6 L V8	7	(United Kingdom) James Littlejohn (United Kingdom) Anthony Wells	LEC; 6	IMO; Ret	MNZ; 7	CAT	SPA; 3	ALG; Ret	10th	29
2022	(United Kingdom) Nielsen Racing	LMP2 Pro-Am	Oreca 07	Gibson GK428 4.2 L V8	24	(United Kingdom) Matt Bell (United Kingdom) Ben Hanley (United States) Rodrigo Sales	LEC; 4	IMO; 3	MNZ; 1	CAT; 2	SPA; 4	ALG; 3	3rd	97
2023	(United Kingdom) Nielsen Racing	LMP3	Ligier JS P320	Nissan VK56DE 5.6 L V8	7	(United Kingdom) Ryan Harper-Ellam (United Kingdom) Anthony Wells	CAT; 5	LEC; 11	ARA; 6	SPA; Ret	POR; 7	ALG; Ret	11th	24
2023	(United Kingdom) Nielsen Racing	LMP2 Pro-Am	Oreca 07	Gibson GK428 4.2 L V8	24	(Switzerland) Mathias Beche (United Kingdom) Ben Hanley (United States) Rodrigo Sales	CAT; 4	LEC; 4	ARA; 2	SPA; Ret	POR; 2	ALG; 3	4th	75
2024	(United Kingdom) Nielsen Racing	LMP2 Pro-Am	Oreca 07	Gibson GK428 4.2 L V8	24	(United States) John Falb (United Kingdom) Colin Noble (Spain) Albert Costa 1–3 (United Kingdom) Nick Yelloly 4–6	CAT; 3	LEC; 5	IMO; 6	SPA; 4	MUG; 5	POR; 3	5th	70
2024	(United Kingdom) Nielsen Racing	LMP2	Oreca 07	Gibson GK428 4.2 L V8	27	(United Kingdom) Will Stevens (Denmark) David Heinemeier Hansson 1–4 (Chile) Nico Pino 1–3 (Denmark) Benjamin Pedersen 4–6 (France) Gabriel Aubry 6	CAT; 13	LEC; 11	IMO; 12	SPA; 13	MUG; 10	POR; 11	11th	1
2025	(United Kingdom) Nielsen Racing	LMP2	Oreca 07	Gibson GK428 4.2 L V8	24	(Portugal) Filipe Albuquerque (Turkey) Cem Bölükbaşı (Austria) Ferdinand Habsburg	CAT; 7	LEC; 5	IMO; 7	**SPA**; 3	SIL; 6	POR; RET	5th	46
2025	(United Kingdom) Nielsen Racing	LMP2 Pro-Am	Oreca 07	Gibson GK428 4.2 L V8	27	(Australia) James Allen (Brazil) Sérgio Sette Câmara (United Kingdom) Anthony Wells 1-3 (United States) John Falb 4-6	CAT; 7	LEC; 1	IMO; 8	SPA; RET	SIL; 6	POR; 9	7th	58
2026*	(United Kingdom) Nielsen Racing	LMP2	Oreca 07	Gibson GK428 4.2 L V8	24	(Australia) Jack Doohan (Israel) Roy Nissany (United Kingdom) Edward Pearson	CAT; 7	LEC	IMO	SPA	SIL	POR	7th*	6*
2026*	(United Kingdom) Nielsen Racing	LMP2 Pro-Am	Oreca 07	Gibson GK428 4.2 L V8	27	(Australia) James Allen (Greece) Kriton Lendoudis (United Kingdom) Alex Quinn	CAT; RET	LEC	IMO	SPA	SIL	POR	12th*	0*

^{*} Season still in progress.

=== Complete Le Mans Cup results ===
Year	Entrant	Class	Chassis	Engine	No.	Drivers	1	2		3		4		5	6	Pos.	Pts.
2017	(United Kingdom) Nielsen Racing	LMP3	Ligier JS P3	Nissan VK50VE 5.0L V8	79	(United Kingdom) Colin Noble (United Kingdom) Anthony Wells	MNZ; 1	LMS; 12	LMS; 22	RBR; 2		LEC; 2		SPA; 2	POR; 5	2nd	90
2018	(United Kingdom) Eccurie Ecosse/Nielsen	LMP3	Ligier JS P3	Nissan VK50VE 5.0L V8	2	(United Kingdom) James Littlejohn (United Kingdom) Anthony Wells	LEC; 3	MNZ; 2		LMS; RET	LMS; 30	RBR; 10		SPA; 2	POR; 3	3rd	68.5
2018	(United Kingdom) Eccurie Ecosse/Nielsen	LMP3	Ligier JS P3	Nissan VK50VE 5.0L V8	79	(United Kingdom) Alasdair McCaig (United Kingdom) Colin Noble	LEC; 2	MNZ; 17		LMS; 5	LMS; RET	RBR; 2		SPA; 1	ALG; 1	2nd	91.5
2019	(United Kingdom) Nielsen Racing	LMP3	Norma M30	Nissan VK50VE 5.0L V8	2	(United Kingdom) Colin Noble (United Kingdom) Anthony Wells	LEC; 3	MNZ; 3		LMS; 3	LMS; 5	BAR; 2		SPA; DSQ	ALG; 2	3rd	79
2020	(United Kingdom) Nielsen Racing	LMP3	Duqueine M30 - D08	Nissan VK56DE 5.6L V8	7	(United Kingdom) Colin Noble (United Kingdom) Anthony Wells	RIC; 14	SPA; 3		LEC; 6		LMS; 11	LMS; 4	MNZ; RET	POR; 1	5th	55
2020	(United Kingdom) Nielsen Racing	LMP3	Duqueine M30 - D08	Nissan VK56DE 5.6L V8	10	(Canada) Garett Grist (United States) Rob Hodes	RIC; 9	SPA; 9		LEC; 7		LMS; 9	LMS; 9	MNZ; 4	POR; RET	10th	24
2021	(United Kingdom) Nielsen Racing	LMP3	Ligier JS P320	Nissan VK56DE 5.6L V8	7	(United Kingdom) Colin Noble (United Kingdom) Anthony Wells	BAR; 6	LEC; 1		MNZ; 3		LMS; 1	LMS; RET	SPA; 5	POR; 9	1st	75
2021	(United Kingdom) Nielsen Racing	LMP3	Ligier JS P320	Nissan VK56DE 5.6L V8	27	(United Kingdom) Nicholas Adcock 4 (Netherlands) Max Koebolt 4 (United Kingdom) Andrew Ferguson 6 (United Kingdom) Jeremy Ferguson 6						LMS; 7	LMS; RET		POR; 22	NC†	NC†
2022	(United Kingdom) Nielsen Racing	LMP3	Duqueine M30 - D08	Nissan VK56DE 5.6L V8	4	(United Kingdom) Matthew Bell (United Kingdom) John Melsom	LEC; 8	IMO; RET		LMS; RET	LMS; 8	MNZ; 22		SPA; 27	POR; 15	19th	7
2022	(United Kingdom) Nielsen Racing	LMP3	Ligier JS P320	Nissan VK56DE 5.6L V8	7	(United Kingdom) Colin Noble (United Kingdom) Anthony Wells	LEC; 6	IMO; 6		LMS; 3	LMS; 9	MNZ; RET		SPA; 4	POR; 2	3rd	55
2023	(United Kingdom) Nielsen Racing	LMP3	Duqueine M30 - D08	Nissan VK56DE 5.6L V8	4	(United Kingdom) Matt Bell (United States) John Melsom	BAR; RET	LMS; 1	LMS; 7	LEC; 11		ARA; RET		SPA; RET	POR; 1	4th	45
2023	(United Kingdom) Nielsen Racing	LMP3	Ligier JS P320	Nissan VK56DE 5.6L V8	7	(United Kingdom) Josh Skelton (United Kingdom) Anthony Wells	BAR; RET	LMS; 18	LMS; 8	LEC; 30		ARA; RET		**SPA**; RET	POR; 1	9th	30
2024	(United Kingdom) Nielsen Racing	LMP3	Ligier JS P320	Nissan VK56DE 5.6L V8	7	(United Kingdom) Wayne Boyd (United Kingdom) Anthony Wells	BAR; 8	LEC; 7		LMS; 6	LMS; 9	SPA; RET		MUG; 3	POR; 2	6th	47.5
2025	(United Kingdom) Nielsen Racing	LMP3	ADESS AD25	Toyota V35A-FTS 3.5 L V6	4	(Colombia) Henry Cubides Olarte (Spain) Mikkel Kristensen	BAR; 12	LEC; 14		LMS; RET	LMS; 16	SPA; RET		SIL; 16	POR; 13	18th	0
2025	(United Kingdom) Nielsen Racing	LMP3	ADESS AD25	Toyota V35A-FTS 3.5 L V6	7	(United Kingdom) Tom Fleming (United Kingdom) Colin Noble	BAR; 11	LEC; RET		LMS; 20	LMS; 15	SPA; 13		SIL; RET	POR; 16	17th	0
2026*	(United Kingdom) Nielsen Racing	LMP3	Duqueine D09	Toyota V35A-FTS 3.5 L V6	4	(France) Jules Caranta (South Africa) Mikaeel Pitamber	BAR; 18	LEC		LMS		SPA		SIL	POR	18th*	0*
2026*	(United Kingdom) Nielsen Racing	LMP3	Duqueine D09	Toyota V35A-FTS 3.5 L V6	7	(United Kingdom) Matt Bell (United States) Wyatt Brichacek	BAR; 13	LEC		LMS		SPA		SIL	POR	13th*	0*

* Season still in progress.

† Guest drivers so ineligible for points.

==== Complete Road to Le Mans results ====
Year	Entrant	Class	Chassis	Engine	No.	Drivers	Race 1	Race 2
2017	(United Kingdom) Nielsen Racing	LMP3	Ligier JS P3	Nissan VK50VE 5.0L V8	79	(United Kingdom) Colin Noble (United Kingdom) Anthony Wells	12	22
2018	(United Kingdom) Ecurie Ecosse/Nielsen	LMP3	Ligier JS P3	Nissan VK50VE 5.0L V8	2	(United Kingdom) James Littlejohn (United Kingdom) Anthony Wells	RET	30
2018	(United Kingdom) Ecurie Ecosse/Nielsen	LMP3	Ligier JS P3	Nissan VK50VE 5.0L V8	74	(United Kingdom) Patrick McClughan (United States) Gerhard Watzinger	27	17
2018	(United Kingdom) Ecurie Ecosse/Nielsen	LMP3	Ligier JS P3	Nissan VK50VE 5.0L V8	75	(United Kingdom) Bonamy Grimes (United Kingdom) Ivor Dunbar	34	28
2018	(United Kingdom) Ecurie Ecosse/Nielsen	LMP3	Ligier JS P3	Nissan VK50VE 5.0L V8	76	(United Kingdom) Alex Kapadia (Denmark) Christian Olsen	8	12
2018	(United Kingdom) Ecurie Ecosse/Nielsen	LMP3	Ligier JS P3	Nissan VK50VE 5.0L V8	79	(United Kingdom) Alasdair McCaig (United Kingdom) Colin Noble	5	RET
2019	(United Kingdom) Eccurie Ecosse/Nielsen	LMP3	Norma M30	Nissan VK50VE 5.0L V8	2	(United Kingdom) James Littlejohn (United Kingdom) Anthony Wells	3	5
2019	(United Kingdom) Eccurie Ecosse/Nielsen	LMP3	Norma M30	Nissan VK50VE 5.0L V8	17	(United Kingdom) Bonamy Grimes (United Kingdom) Ivor Dunbar	13	23
2019	(United Kingdom) Eccurie Ecosse/Nielsen	LMP3	Ligier JS P3	Nissan VK50VE 5.0L V8	18	(United Kingdom) James Littlejohn (Japan) Nobuya Yamanaka	20	14
2020	(United Kingdom) Nielsen Racing	LMP3	Duqueine M30 - D08	Nissan VK56DE 5.6L V8	7	(United Kingdom) Colin Noble (United Kingdom) Anthony Wells	11	4
2020	(United Kingdom) Nielsen Racing	LMP3	Duqueine M30 - D08	Nissan VK56DE 5.6L V8	10	(Canada) Garett Grist (United States) Rob Hodes	9	9
2021	(United Kingdom) Nielsen Racing	LMP3	Ligier JS P320	Nissan VK56DE 5.6L V8	7	(United Kingdom) Colin Noble (United Kingdom) Anthony Wells	1	RET
2021	(United Kingdom) Nielsen Racing	LMP3	Ligier JS P320	Nissan VK56DE 5.6L V8	27	(United Kingdom) Nicholas Adcock (Netherlands) Max Koebolt	7	RET
2021	(United Kingdom) Nielsen Racing	LMP3	Ligier JS P320	Nissan VK56DE 5.6L V8	28	(United States) Tristan Nunez (United States) Steven Thomas	RET	8
2022	(United Kingdom) Nielsen Racing	LMP3	Duqueine M30 - D08	Nissan VK56DE 5.6L V8	4	(United Kingdom) Matthew Bell (United Kingdom) John Melsom	RET	8
2022	(United Kingdom) Nielsen Racing	LMP3	Ligier JS P320	Nissan VK56DE 5.6L V8	7	(United Kingdom) Colin Noble (United Kingdom) Anthony Wells	3	9
2023	(United Kingdom) Nielsen Racing	LMP3	Duqueine M30 - D08	Nissan VK56DE 5.6L V8	4	(United Kingdom) Matt Bell (United States) John Melsom	1	7
2023	(United Kingdom) Nielsen Racing	LMP3	Ligier JS P320	Nissan VK56DE 5.6L V8	7	(United Kingdom) Josh Skelton (United Kingdom) Anthony Wells	18	8
2024	(United Kingdom) Nielsen Racing	LMP3	Ligier JS P320	Nissan VK56DE 5.6L V8	4	(Canada) Garett Grist (United States) Anthony McIntosh	16	27
2024	(United Kingdom) Nielsen Racing	LMP3	Ligier JS P320	Nissan VK56DE 5.6L V8	7	(United Kingdom) Wayne Boyd (United Kingdom) Anthony Wells	6	9
2025	(United Kingdom) Nielsen Racing	LMP3	ADESS AD25	Toyota V35A-FTS 3.5 L V6	4	(Colombia) Henry Cubides Olarte (Spain) Mikkel Kristensen	RET	16
2025	(United Kingdom) Nielsen Racing	LMP3	ADESS AD25	Toyota V35A-FTS 3.5 L V6	7	(United Kingdom) Tom Fleming (United Kingdom) Colin Noble	20	15

=== Complete Asian Le Mans Series results ===
Year	Entrant	Class	Chassis	Engine	No	Drivers	1	2	3	4	5	6	Pos.	Pts
2018-19	(United Kingdom) Ecurie Ecosse/Nielsen	LMP3	Ligier JS P3	Nissan VK50VE 5.0 L V8	7	(United Kingdom) Nick Adcock (Denmark) Christian Stubbe Olsen	SHA; 5	FUJ; 4	CHA; 4	SEP; 2			5th	52
2018-19	(United Kingdom) Ecurie Ecosse/Nielsen	LMP3	Ligier JS P3	Nissan VK50VE 5.0 L V8	79	(United Kingdom) Colin Noble (United Kingdom) Anthony Wells	SHA; 4	FUJ; 3	CHA; 3	SEP; 4			3rd	54
2019-20	(United Kingdom) Nielsen Racing	LMP3	Norma M30	Nissan VK50VE 5.0 L V8	2	(United Kingdom) Colin Noble (United Kingdom) Tony Wells	SHA; 2	BEN; 1	SEP; 4	CHA; 2			1st	75
2019-20	(United Kingdom) Nielsen Racing	LMP3	Norma M30	Nissan VK50VE 5.0 L V8	3	(United States) Charles Crews (Canada) Garett Grist (United States) Rob Hodes	**SHA**; 6	BEN; Ret	SEP; 2	CHA; 5			5th	37
2021	(United Kingdom) Nielsen Racing	LMP3	Ligier JS P320	Nissan VK56DE 5.6 L V8	8	(United Kingdom) Matt Bell (United States) Rodrigo Sales	DUB; Ret	DUB; 3	ABU; 2	ABU; 7			5th	39
2021	(United Kingdom) Nielsen Racing	LMP3	Ligier JS P320	Nissan VK56DE 5.6 L V8	9	(United Kingdom) Colin Noble (United Kingdom) Tony Wells	DUB; 2	DUB; Ret	ABU; 1	ABU; 6			3rd	51
2022	(United Kingdom) Nielsen Racing	LMP2	Oreca 07	Gibson GK428 4.2 L V8	4	(United Kingdom) Matt Bell (United Kingdom) Ben Hanley (United States) Rodrigo Sales	DUB; 1	DUB; 1	ABU (Note: United Autosports, who won the race, were deemed ineligible for points after opting to perform an in-season private test at the Yas Marina Circuit prior to the 4 Hours of Abu Dhabi. The championship standings therefore do not reflect their presence in the championship.); 2	ABU; 2			1st	104
2022	(United Kingdom) Nielsen Racing	LMP3	Ligier JS P320	Nissan VK56DE 5.6 L V8	8	(United Kingdom) Colin Noble (United Kingdom) Tony Wells	DUB; 7	DUB; 1	ABU; 4	ABU; 6			4th	51
2023	(United Kingdom) Nielsen Racing	LMP3	Ligier JS P320	Nissan VK56DE 5.6 L V8	4	(United Kingdom) Matt Bell (United Kingdom) Tony Wells	DUB; 13	DUB; 6	ABU; 1	ABU; 4			3rd	45
2023	(United Kingdom) Nielsen Racing	LMP2	Oreca 07	Gibson GK428 4.2 L V8	24	(Switzerland) Mathias Beche (United Kingdom) Ben Hanley (United States) Rodrigo Sales	DUB; 4	DUB; 3	ABU; 6	ABU; 8			6th	39
2023-24	(United Kingdom) Nielsen Racing	LMP2	Oreca 07	Gibson GK428 4.2 L V8	24	(Mexico) Alex García (United Kingdom) Ian Loggie (Austria) Ferdinand Habsburg 1–2, 4–5 (United Kingdom) Will Stevens 3	SEP; 9	SEP; Ret	DUB; 9	ABU; 9	ABU; 7		10th	12
2023-24	(United Kingdom) Nielsen Racing	LMP2	Oreca 07	Gibson GK428 4.2 L V8	34	(United Kingdom) Matt Bell (United States) Patrick Liddy (United States) Blake McDonald	SEP	SEP	DUB; 11	ABU; 8	ABU; 9		12th	6
2024-25	(United Kingdom) Nielsen Racing	LMP2	Oreca 07	Gibson GK428 4.2 L V8	24	(United Kingdom) Matt Bell (Netherlands) Nicky Catsburg (United States) Naveen Rao	SEP; 5	SEP; 5	DUB; 7	DUB; 7	ABU; 4	ABU; 2	6th	62
2025-26	(United Kingdom) Nielsen Racing	LMP2	Oreca 07	Gibson GK428 4.2 L V8	64	(Turkey) Cem Bölükbaşı (Greece) Kriton Lendoudis (United Kingdom) Alex Quinn	SEP; 4	SEP; 9	DUB; 7	DUB; 14	ABU; 14	ABU; 6	9th	28

^{*} Season still in progress.

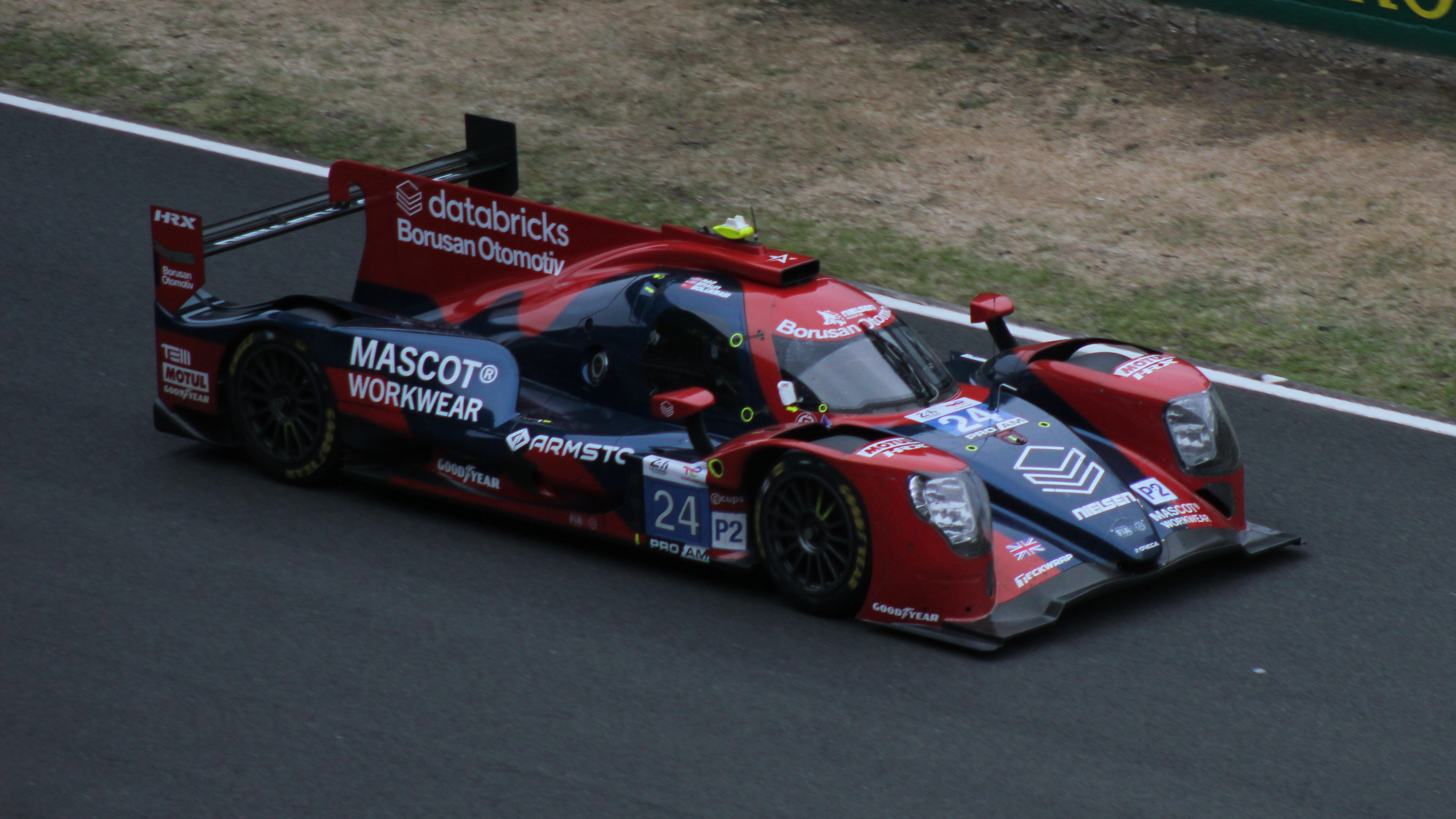
No. 24 Nielsen Racing Oreca 07-Gibson at the 2025 24 Hours of Le Mans

=== 24 Hours of Le Mans results ===
Year	Entrant	No.	Car	Drivers	Class	Laps	Pos.	Class Pos.
2020	(United Kingdom) Nielsen Racing	24	Oreca 07-Gibson	(Canada) Garett Grist (United Kingdom) Alex Kapadia (United Kingdom) Anthony Wells	LMP2	338	28th	16th
2022	(United Kingdom) Nielsen Racing	24	Oreca 07-Gibson	(United Kingdom) Matt Bell (United Kingdom) Ben Hanley (United States) Rodrigo Sales	LMP2 (Pro-Am)	362	20th	**2nd**
2023	(United Kingdom) Nielsen Racing	14	Oreca 07-Gibson	(Switzerland) Mathias Beche (United Kingdom) Ben Hanley (United States) Rodrigo Sales	LMP2 (Pro-Am)	18	DNF	DNF
2024	(United Kingdom) Nielsen Racing	24	Oreca 07-Gibson	(Denmark) David Heinemeier Hansson (Switzerland) Fabio Scherer (Cayman Islands) Kyffin Simpson	LMP2	291	25th	11th
2025	(United Kingdom) Nielsen Racing	24	Oreca 07-Gibson	(Turkey) Cem Bölükbaşı (United States) Colin Braun (United States) Naveen Rao	LMP2 (Pro-Am)	170	DNF	DNF
2026	(United Kingdom) Nielsen Racing	24	Oreca 07-Gibson	(Australia) Jack Doohan (Denmark) David Heinemeier Hansson (United Kingdom) Edward Pearson	LMP2	341	32nd	18th

=== Euroformula Open Championship ===
Year	Car	Drivers	Races	Wins	Poles	F/Laps	Podiums	Points	D.C.	T.C.
2025	Dallara 324-TOM'S	(United Kingdom) Edward Pearson	24	2	0	1	6	227	5th	3rd
2025	Dallara 324-TOM'S	(United States) Shawn Rashid	12	0	0	0	0	41	10th	3rd
2025	Dallara 324-TOM'S	(Cyprus) Theo Micouris	3	0	0	0	1	32	11th	3rd
2025	Dallara 324-TOM'S	(United Kingdom) Finley Green	15	0	0	0	0	31	12th	3rd
2025	Dallara 324-TOM'S	(Argentina) Gino Trappa	3	0	0	0	0	18	17th	3rd
2025	Dallara 324-TOM'S	(Romania) Luca Viișoreanu†	6	0	0	0	0	18	18th	3rd
2025	Dallara 324-TOM'S	(Argentina) Francisco Soldavini	3	0	0	0	0	4	20th	3rd
2025	Dallara 324-TOM'S	(Brazil) Ricardo Baptista	3	0	0	0	0	1	21st	3rd
2025	Dallara 324-TOM'S	(Greece) Taxiarchis Kolovos	3	0	0	0	0	0	NC	3rd

^{*} Season still in progress.

† Viișoreanu drove for Team Motopark in round 6.

== Timeline ==
Current series
Le Mans Cup	2017–present
European Le Mans Series	2018–present
Asian Le Mans Series	2018–present
Ligier European Series	2024–present
Euroformula Open Championship	2025–present
Former series
British LMP3 Cup	2017–2018
IMSA Prototype Challenge	2020
Prototype Cup Germany	2022
Ultimate Cup Series	2023
