= 2020 Road to Le Mans =

Circuit de la Sarthe track

The 5th Road to Le Mans was an automobile endurance event that took place on 17 and 19 September 2020, at the Circuit de la Sarthe, Le Mans, France. The race features LMP3 and GT3 category cars competing in their respective classes.

== Background ==
The Road to Le Mans doubleheader for Le Mans Prototype 3 (LMP3) and Group GT3 (GT3) vehicles was set to be held on 13 and 14 June but was postponed to 18 and 19 September by the Automobile Club de l'Ouest (ACO) due to the COVID-19 pandemic in France. It was held behind closed doors at the 13.626 km (8.467 mi) Circuit de la Sarthe, near Le Mans, France. It was the fifth edition of the event, the fourth round of the 2020 Le Mans Cup and was a support race for the 2020 24 Hours of Le Mans.

Jean Glorieux and Laurents Hörr led the LMP3 Drivers' Championship with 56 championship points with one race victory and a pole position. The duo were 12 championship points ahead of the second-placed Matthias Kaiser and Rory Penttinen and 15 in front of Maurice Smith in third. Rino Mastronardi led the GT3 Drivers' Championship with 67 championship points and two class victories and two pole positions, 15 championship points in front of Giacomo Piccini in second. The No. 3 DKR Engineering squad led the LMP3 Teams' Championship with 56 championship points, leading the No. 26 Graff team by 12 championship points. With 67 championship points, the No. 8 Iron Lynx team led the LMP3 Teams' Championship by 22 championship points over the No. 67 Kessel Racing squad.

== Regulations and entrants ==
The ACO's selection committee invited all current Le Mans Cup entrants and selected one-off entries to the race. All full-time Le Mans Cup entrants automatically earned invitations. Teams competing in Le Mans-based endurance racing series such as the Asian Le Mans Series, the Asian Le Mans Sprint Cup, the European Le Mans Series (ELMS) and the IMSA SportsCar Championship received priority in getting invitations. Each car was piloted by two drivers and each team was required to sign at least one bronze-rated driver (that is a gentleman driver) and their second driver could hold either a silver or gold-rated licence. All racers were given a mandatory on-track time of at least 20 minutes for the race. Every car had to make a mandatory pit stop to change drivers during both races. Championship points were awarded to all entrants in both classes provided they finished anywhere from first and below. The two pole position winners for each of the two races in each class received one championship point.

The entry list was published by the ACO on 10 September 2020. The 34-car entry list included 23 LMP3 and 11 GT3 cars, the fewest number of entrants in the race's history. There were 68 drivers from 21 different countries who were signed by 22 separate teams. In addition to the 23 guaranteed Le Mans Cup entries, there were five ELMS entries, two from the GT World Challenge Europe while the rest of the field was filled with one-off entries only competing at Le Mans. There were two manufacturers that were represented in LMP3 and they were Duqueine and Ligier. Many of the LMP3 entries came from the Le Mans Cup and all but eight fielded Ligier JS P320-Nissans with the remaining eight entering Duqueine D08 cars. There were three manufacturers (Ferrari, Lamborghini and Porsche) who were represented in the GT3 category. A total of eight Ferrari 488 GT3s, two Porsche 911 GT3 Rs and a single Lamborghini Huracán GT3 Evo were the three vehicles entered in the class. Julien Andlauer, Garett Grist, Rino Mastronardi, Andrea Piccini, Paolo Ruberti, Claudio Schiavoni and Anthony Wells were the seven drivers who participated in both the Road to Le Mans and the 24 Hours of Le Mans.

== Practice ==
Two one-hour practice sessions were held on the morning of 17 September and later that evening. Niko Kari in the No. 14 EuroInternational Ligier car set the fastest lap time of 3:50.145 in the first practice session, eight-tenths of a second slower than the series's LMP3 class record. Kari was almost four-tenths of a second quicker than the second-placed No. 15 RLR Msport entry of Malthe Jakobsen. Wayne Boyd's No. 23 United Autosports car was third-fastest. Mastronardi's No. 8 Iron Lynx Ferrari was fastest in the GT3 class with a lap time of 3:58.172. He was ahead of Andrea Caldarelli's No. 63 FFF Racing Team by ACM Lamborghini and Andlauer's No. 2 Pzoberer Zürichsee by TFT Porsche. Practice was stopped when a car spun into the gravel trap and causing the race director to prematurely end the session. Marshals extricated the car from the gravel and it was driven to the pit lane.

Kari continued to set the outright pace in the second practice session with the quickest lap time of 3:47.054, almost seven-tenths of a second faster than the second-placed No. 21 Mühlner Motorsport Duqueine car of Gilles Magnus. Jakobsen in the No. 15 RLR Msport car was third-fastest overall. The fastest GT3 car was Andlauer's No. 2 Pzoberer Zürichsee Porsche with a 3:55.355 lap that was 0.676 seconds faster than the second-placed No. 63 FFF Lamborghini of Caldarelli. David Perel's No. 74 Kessel Ferrari was third in class.

== Qualifying ==
There were two 20-minute qualifying sessions held on the morning of 18 September to set the starting order for both races. The first session saw any one driver be allowed by their teams to participate and determine the starting grid for the first race. Each team's Bronze-rated driver partook in the second session to set the starting order for the second race. Boyd's No. 23 United Autosports car recorded the fastest qualifying lap time of 3:47.025 on his final timed lap at the conclusion of the first qualifying session to achieve his third pole position of the season. He was 0.711 seconds quicker than Kari's second-placed No. 14 EuroInternational entry, which held pole position for a majority of qualifying until Boyd's lap. Hörr's No. 3 DKR Duqueine vehicle completed the top three overall starters. In GT3, Calderelli achieved the category pole position in the No. 63 FFF Lamborghini with a 3:54.716 lap. Perel set the second-fastest lap time in the No. 74 Kessel Ferrari, ahead of Giamcomo Piccini's No. 8 Iron Lynx Ferrari. The No. 51 Spirit Ferrari ran off the circuit close to the pit lane exit and the session was stopped before resuming with 17 minutes remaining when the car was extricated.

The second qualifying session saw the No. 37 Cool Racing entry of Nicolas Maulini secure pole position with a lap time of 3:49.079. Maulini was 2.8 seconds faster than Glorieux No. 3 DKR vehicle in second place after closing the gap from four seconds late in the session. The No. 26 Graff car of Penttinen was third on the grid. CD Sport's No. 5 entry driven by Michael Jensen ran off the circuit and qualifying was ended three minutes early as a result. Mastronardi secured pole position in the No. 8 Iron Lynx Ferrari with a time of 3:56.532. The No. 63 FFF Lamborghini driven by Hiroshi Hamaguchi qualified second in class, ahead of Michael Broniszewski's No. 74 Kessel Ferrari in third.

=== Qualifying results ===
Provisional pole positions in each class are denoted in bold.

=== Race 1 ===
| Pos. | Class | No. | Team | Qualifying | Grid |
|---|---|---|---|---|---|
| 1 | LMP3 | 23 | **United Autosports** | **3:47.025** | 1 |
| 2 | LMP3 | 14 | Eurointernational | 3:47.736 | 2 |
| 3 | LMP3 | 3 | DKR Engineering | 3:47.877 | 3 |
| 4 | LMP3 | 4 | Realteam Racing | 3:47.918 | 4 |
| 5 | LMP3 | 37 | Cool Racing | 3:52.473 | 5 |
| 6 | LMP3 | 7 | Nielsen Racing | 3:48.216 | 6 |
| 7 | LMP3 | 1 | DKR Engineering | 3:48.321 | 7 |
| 8 | LMP3 | 69 | Cool Racing | 3:48.420 | 8 |
| 9 | LMP3 | 24 | United Autosports | 3:48.522 | 9 |
| 10 | LMP3 | 9 | Mühlner Motorsport | 3:48.987 | 10 |
| 11 | LMP3 | 15 | RLR MSport | 3:49.646 | 11 |
| 12 | LMP3 | 12 | Team Virage | 3:50.130 | 12 |
| 13 | LMP3 | 66 | Rinaldi Racing | 3:50.219 | 13 |
| 14 | LMP3 | 22 | United Autosports | 3:50.331 | 14 |
| 15 | LMP3 | 27 | MV2S Racing | 3:51.021 | 15 |
| 16 | LMP3 | 10 | Nielsen Racing | 3:52.726 | 16 |
| 17 | LMP3 | 6 | CD Sport | 3:53.084 | 17 |
| 18 | GT3 | 63 | **Orange1 FFF Racing Team** | **3:54.716** | 18 |
| 19 | LMP3 | 11 | Racing Experience | 3:54.878 | 19 |
| 20 | GT3 | 74 | Kessel Racing | 3:55.128 | 20 |
| 21 | GT3 | 8 | Iron Lynx | 3:55.345 | 21 |
| 22 | GT3 | 77 | Iron Lynx | 3:55.355 | 22 |
| 23 | LMP3 | 25 | United Autosports | 3:55.493 | 23 |
| 24 | GT3 | 50 | Kessel Racing | 3:56.566 | 24 |
| 25 | LMP3 | 26 | Graff | 3:56.577 | 25 |
| 26 | GT3 | 9 | Iron Lynx | 3:56.776 | 26 |
| 27 | LMP3 | 93 | Sky - Tempesta Racing | 3:57.424 | 27 |
| 28 | LMP3 | 67 | Kessel Racing | 3:57.846 | 28 |
| 29 | LMP3 | 5 | CD Sport | 3:57.884 | 29 |
| 30 | LMP3 | 75 | IDEC Sport | 3:58.428 | 30 |
| 31 | GT3 | 28 | Delahaye Racing Team | 4:00.304 | 31 |
| 32 | GT3 | 2 | Porsche Centre Oberer Zürichsee by TFT | No time | 32 |
| 33 | GT3 | 51 | Spirit of Race | No time | 33 |
| 34 | LMP3 | 55 | Rinaldi Racing | No time | 34 |

=== Race 2 ===
| Pos. | Class | No. | Team | Qualifying | Grid |
|---|---|---|---|---|---|
| 1 | LMP3 | 37 | **Cool Racing** | **3:49.079** | 1 |
| 2 | LMP3 | 3 | DKR Engineering | 3:51.939 | 2 |
| 3 | LMP3 | 26 | Graff | 3:52.071 | 3 |
| 4 | LMP3 | 14 | Eurointernational | 3:53.399 | 4 |
| 5 | LMP3 | 11 | Racing Experience | 3:53.725 | 5 |
| 6 | LMP3 | 69 | Cool Racing | 3:54.216 | 6 |
| 7 | LMP3 | 75 | IDEC Sport | 3:54.312 | 7 |
| 8 | GT3 | 8 | **Iron Lynx** | **3:56.532** | 8 |
| 9 | GT3 | 63 | Orange1 FFF Racing Team | 3:58.133 | 9 |
| 10 | LMP3 | 23 | United Autosports | 3:58.431 | 10 |
| 11 | LMP3 | 1 | DKR Engineering | 3:58.518 | 11 |
| 12 | LMP3 | 23 | United Autosports | 3:56.073 | 12 |
| 13 | LMP3 | 15 | RLR MSport | 3:58.946 | 13 |
| 14 | LMP3 | 10 | Nielsen Racing | 3:59.089 | 14 |
| 15 | LMP3 | 6 | CD Sport | 3:59.257 | 15 |
| 16 | LMP3 | 24 | United Autosports | 3:59.509 | 16 |
| 17 | LMP3 | 27 | MV2S Racing | 4:00.241 | 17 |
| 18 | LMP3 | 22 | United Autosports | 4:00.627 | 18 |
| 19 | LMP3 | 4 | Realteam Racing | 4:00.818 | 19 |
| 20 | GT3 | 74 | Kessel Racing | 4:01.274 | 20 |
| 21 | GT3 | 2 | Porsche Centre Oberer Zürichsee by TFT | 4:01.667 | 21 |
| 22 | GT3 | 93 | Sky - Tempesta Racing | 4:01.956 | 22 |
| 23 | LMP3 | 66 | Rinaldi Racing | 4:04.982 | 23 |
| 24 | GT3 | 9 | Iron Lynx | 4:07.441 | 24 |
| 25 | GT3 | 77 | Iron Lynx | 4:09.592 | 25 |
| 26 | GT3 | 67 | Kessel Racing | 4:10.723 | 26 |
| 27 | GT3 | 50 | Kessel Racing | 4:14.086 | 27 |
| 28 | LMP3 | 25 | United Autosports | 4:14.426 | 28 |
| 29 | LMP3 | 5 | CD Sport | 4:17.539 | 29 |
| 30 | LMP3 | 28 | Delahaye Racing Team | 4:20.131 | 30 |
| 31 | LMP3 | 12 | Team Virage | No time | 31 |
| 32 | LMP3 | 21 | Mühlner Motorsport | No time | 32 |
| 33 | GT3 | 51 | Spirit of Race | No time | 33 |
| 34 | LMP3 | 55 | Rinaldi Racing | No time | 34 |

== Races ==
=== Race 1 ===
| Pos | Class | No. | Team | Drivers | Chassis | Tyre | Laps | Time/Reason |
| Pos | Class | No. | Team | Drivers | Engine | Tyre | Laps | Time/Reason |
|---|---|---|---|---|---|---|---|---|
| 1 | LMP3 | 3 | (Luxembourg) DKR Engineering | (Belgium) Jean Glorieux (Germany) Laurents Hörr | Duqueine M30 - D08 | M | 13 | 54:01.658 |
| 1 | LMP3 | 3 | (Luxembourg) DKR Engineering | (Belgium) Jean Glorieux (Germany) Laurents Hörr | Nissan 5.6 L V8 | M | 13 | 54:01.658 |
| 2 | LMP3 | 37 | (Switzerland) Cool Racing | (France) Edouard Cauhaupe (France) Nicolas Maulini | Ligier JS P320 | M | 13 | +0.590 |
| 2 | LMP3 | 37 | (Switzerland) Cool Racing | (France) Edouard Cauhaupe (France) Nicolas Maulini | Nissan 5.6 L V8 | M | 13 | +0.590 |
| 3 | LMP3 | 69 | (Switzerland) Cool Racing | (United Kingdom) Matt Bell (United States) Maurice Smith | Ligier JS P320 | M | 13 | +1.017 |
| 3 | LMP3 | 69 | (Switzerland) Cool Racing | (United Kingdom) Matt Bell (United States) Maurice Smith | Nissan 5.6 L V8 | M | 13 | +1.017 |
| 4 | LMP3 | 24 | (United Kingdom) United Autosports | (United Kingdom) Andy Meyrick (Brazil) Daniel Schneider | Ligier JS P320 | M | 13 | +43.205 |
| 4 | LMP3 | 24 | (United Kingdom) United Autosports | (United Kingdom) Andy Meyrick (Brazil) Daniel Schneider | Nissan 5.6 L V8 | M | 13 | +43.205 |
| 5 | LMP3 | 23 | (United Kingdom) United Autosports | (United Kingdom) Wayne Boyd (United States) John Schauerman | Ligier JS P320 | M | 13 | +58.620 |
| 5 | LMP3 | 23 | (United Kingdom) United Autosports | (United Kingdom) Wayne Boyd (United States) John Schauerman | Nissan 5.6 L V8 | M | 13 | +58.620 |
| 6 | LMP3 | 1 | (Luxembourg) DKR Engineering | (Germany) Wolfgang Triller (Belgium) Ugo de Wilde | Duqueine M30 - D08 | M | 13 | +58.920 |
| 6 | LMP3 | 1 | (Luxembourg) DKR Engineering | (Germany) Wolfgang Triller (Belgium) Ugo de Wilde | Nissan 5.6 L V8 | M | 13 | +58.920 |
| 7 | LMP3 | 15 | (United Kingdom) RLR MSport | (Canada) James Dayson (Denmark) Malthe Jakobsen | Ligier JS P320 | M | 13 | +59.046 |
| 7 | LMP3 | 15 | (United Kingdom) RLR MSport | (Canada) James Dayson (Denmark) Malthe Jakobsen | Nissan 5.6 L V8 | M | 13 | +59.046 |
| 8 | LMP3 | 11 | (Luxembourg) Racing Experience | (Luxembourg) David Hauser (France) Nicolas Melin | Duqueine D-08 | M | 13 | +59.505 |
| 8 | LMP3 | 11 | (Luxembourg) Racing Experience | (Luxembourg) David Hauser (France) Nicolas Melin | Nissan 5.6 L V8 | M | 13 | +59.505 |
| 9 | LMP3 | 4 | (Switzerland) Realteam Racing | (Switzerland) David Droux (Switzerland) Esteban García | Ligier JS P320 | M | 13 | +1:02.053 |
| 9 | LMP3 | 4 | (Switzerland) Realteam Racing | (Switzerland) David Droux (Switzerland) Esteban García | Nissan 5.6 L V8 | M | 13 | +1:02.053 |
| 10 | LMP3 | 21 | (Belgium) Mühlner Motorsport | (Germany) Moritz Kranz (Belgium) Gilles Magnus | Duqueine M30 - D08 | M | 13 | +1:02.102 |
| 10 | LMP3 | 21 | (Belgium) Mühlner Motorsport | (Germany) Moritz Kranz (Belgium) Gilles Magnus | Nissan 5.6 L V8 | M | 13 | +1:02.102 |
| 11 | LMP3 | 12 | (Poland) Team Virage | (Belgium) Tom Cloet (Australia) James Winslow | Ligier JS P320 | M | 13 | +1:18.810 |
| 11 | LMP3 | 12 | (Poland) Team Virage | (Belgium) Tom Cloet (Australia) James Winslow | Nissan 5.6 L V8 | M | 13 | +1:18.810 |
| 12 | LMP3 | 27 | (France) MV2S Racing | (France) Christophe Cresp (France) Bruce Jouanny | Ligier JS P320 | M | 13 | +1:18.955 |
| 12 | LMP3 | 27 | (France) MV2S Racing | (France) Christophe Cresp (France) Bruce Jouanny | Nissan 5.6 L V8 | M | 13 | +1:18.955 |
| 13 | LMP3 | 22 | (United Kingdom) United Autosports | (United States) Jim McGuire (United Kingdom) Duncan Tappy | Ligier JS P320 | M | 13 | +1:19.279 |
| 13 | LMP3 | 22 | (United Kingdom) United Autosports | (United States) Jim McGuire (United Kingdom) Duncan Tappy | Nissan 5.6 L V8 | M | 13 | +1:19.279 |
| 14 | LMP3 | 10 | (United Kingdom) Nielsen Racing | (Canada) Garett Grist (United States) Rob Hodes | Duqueine M30 - D08 | M | 13 | +1:31.794 |
| 14 | LMP3 | 10 | (United Kingdom) Nielsen Racing | (Canada) Garett Grist (United States) Rob Hodes | Nissan 5.6 L V8 | M | 13 | +1:31.794 |
| 15 | LMP3 | 66 | (Germany) Rinaldi Racing | (Germany) Steve Parrow (Germany) Dominik Schwager | Duqueine M30 - D08 | M | 13 | +1:34.145 |
| 15 | LMP3 | 66 | (Germany) Rinaldi Racing | (Germany) Steve Parrow (Germany) Dominik Schwager | Nissan 5.6 L V8 | M | 13 | +1:34.145 |
| 16 | GT3 | 63 | (China) Orange1 FFF Racing Team | (Italy) Andrea Caldarelli (Japan) Hiroshi Hamaguchi | Lamborghini Huracán GT3 Evo | M | 13 | +1:42.559 |
| 16 | GT3 | 63 | (China) Orange1 FFF Racing Team | (Italy) Andrea Caldarelli (Japan) Hiroshi Hamaguchi | Lamborghini 5.2 L V10 | M | 13 | +1:42.559 |
| 17 | LMP3 | 7 | (United Kingdom) Nielsen Racing | (United Kingdom) Colin Noble (United Kingdom) Anthony Wells | Duqueine M30 - D08 | M | 13 | +1:43.515 |
| 17 | LMP3 | 7 | (United Kingdom) Nielsen Racing | (United Kingdom) Colin Noble (United Kingdom) Anthony Wells | Nissan 5.6 L V8 | M | 13 | +1:43.515 |
| 18 | GT3 | 8 | (Italy) Iron Lynx | (Italy) Rino Mastronardi (Italy) Giacomo Piccini | Ferrari 488 GT3 | M | 13 | +1:58.744 |
| 18 | GT3 | 8 | (Italy) Iron Lynx | (Italy) Rino Mastronardi (Italy) Giacomo Piccini | Ferrari F154CB 3.9 L Turbo V8 | M | 13 | +1:58.744 |
| 19 | GT3 | 74 | (Switzerland) Kessel Racing | (Poland) Michael Broniszewski (South Africa) David Perel | Ferrari 488 GT3 | M | 13 | +2:00.175 |
| 19 | GT3 | 74 | (Switzerland) Kessel Racing | (Poland) Michael Broniszewski (South Africa) David Perel | Ferrari F154CB 3.9 L Turbo V8 | M | 13 | +2:00.175 |
| 20 | GT3 | 93 | (United Kingdom) Sky - Tempesta Racing | (United Kingdom) Chris Froggatt (Hong Kong) Jonathan Hui | Ferrari 488 GT3 | M | 13 | +2:04.992 |
| 20 | GT3 | 93 | (United Kingdom) Sky - Tempesta Racing | (United Kingdom) Chris Froggatt (Hong Kong) Jonathan Hui | Ferrari F154CB 3.9 L Turbo V8 | M | 13 | +2:04.992 |
| 21 | LMP3 | 25 | (United Kingdom) United Autosports | (United Kingdom) Shaun Lynn (United Kingdom) Joe Macari | Ligier JS P320 | M | 13 | +2:55.004 |
| 21 | LMP3 | 25 | (United Kingdom) United Autosports | (United Kingdom) Shaun Lynn (United Kingdom) Joe Macari | Nissan 5.6 L V8 | M | 13 | +2:55.004 |
| 22 | GT3 | 77 | (Italy) Iron Lynx | (Italy) Andrea Piccini (Italy) Claudio Schiavoni | Ferrari 488 GT3 | M | 13 | +2:57.181 |
| 22 | GT3 | 77 | (Italy) Iron Lynx | (Italy) Andrea Piccini (Italy) Claudio Schiavoni | Ferrari F154CB 3.9 L Turbo V8 | M | 13 | +2:57.181 |
| 23 | GT3 | 50 | (Switzerland) Kessel Racing | (United Kingdom) Oliver Hancock (United Kingdom) John Hartshorne | Ferrari 488 GT3 | M | 13 | +3:01.439 |
| 23 | GT3 | 50 | (Switzerland) Kessel Racing | (United Kingdom) Oliver Hancock (United Kingdom) John Hartshorne | Ferrari F154CB 3.9 L Turbo V8 | M | 13 | +3:01.439 |
| 24 | LMP3 | 14 | (United States) Eurointernational | (France) François Hériau (Finland) Niko Kari | Ligier JS P320 | M | 12 | +1 Lap |
| 24 | LMP3 | 14 | (United States) Eurointernational | (France) François Hériau (Finland) Niko Kari | Nissan 5.6 L V8 | M | 12 | +1 Lap |
| 25 | GT3 | 28 | (Belgium) Delahaye Racing Team | (France) Pierre-Etienne Bordet (France) Alexandre Viron | Porsche 997 GT3 R | M | 12 | +1 Lap |
| 25 | GT3 | 28 | (Belgium) Delahaye Racing Team | (France) Pierre-Etienne Bordet (France) Alexandre Viron | Porsche 4.0 L Flat-6 | M | 12 | +1 Lap |
| 26 | LMP3 | 55 | (Germany) Rinaldi Racing | (Germany) Alexander Mattschull (France) Nicolas Schatz | Duqueine M30 - D08 | M | 12 | +1 Lap |
| 26 | LMP3 | 55 | (Germany) Rinaldi Racing | (Germany) Alexander Mattschull (France) Nicolas Schatz | Nissan 5.6 L V8 | M | 12 | +1 Lap |
| 27 | GT3 | 2 | (Switzerland) Porsche Centre Oberer Zürichsee by TFT | (France) Julien Andlauer (Switzerland) Nicolas Leutwiler | Porsche 911 GT3 R | M | 12 | +1 Lap |
| 27 | GT3 | 2 | (Switzerland) Porsche Centre Oberer Zürichsee by TFT | (France) Julien Andlauer (Switzerland) Nicolas Leutwiler | Porsche 4.0 L Flat-6 | M | 12 | +1 Lap |
| 28 | GT3 | 67 | (Switzerland) Kessel Racing | (Italy) Nicola Cadei (Turkey) Murat Cuhadaroglu | Ferrari 488 GT3 | M | 11 | +2 Laps |
| 28 | GT3 | 67 | (Switzerland) Kessel Racing | (Italy) Nicola Cadei (Turkey) Murat Cuhadaroglu | Ferrari F154CB 3.9 L Turbo V8 | M | 11 | +2 Laps |
| 29 | LMP3 | 26 | (France) Graff | (Liechtenstein) Matthias Kaiser (Finland) Rory Penttinen | Ligier JS P320 | M | 10 | +3 Laps |
| 29 | LMP3 | 26 | (France) Graff | (Liechtenstein) Matthias Kaiser (Finland) Rory Penttinen | Nissan 5.6 L V8 | M | 10 | +3 Laps |
| 30 | LMP3 | 6 | (Spain) CD Sport | (France) Kevin Bole-Besançon (France) Jacques Wolff | Ligier JS P320 | M | 11 | DNF |
| 30 | LMP3 | 6 | (Spain) CD Sport | (France) Kevin Bole-Besançon (France) Jacques Wolff | Nissan 5.6 L V8 | M | 11 | DNF |
| 31 | GT3 | 9 | (Italy) Iron Lynx | (Italy) Paolo Ruberti (Germany) Murad Sultanov | Ferrari 488 GT3 | M | 4 | DNF |
| 31 | GT3 | 9 | (Italy) Iron Lynx | (Italy) Paolo Ruberti (Germany) Murad Sultanov | Ferrari F154CB 3.9 L Turbo V8 | M | 4 | DNF |
| 32 | LMP3 | 5 | (Spain) CD Sport | (United Kingdom) Nicholas Adcock (Denmark) Mikkel Jensen | Ligier JS P320 | M | 1 | DNF |
| 32 | LMP3 | 5 | (Spain) CD Sport | (United Kingdom) Nicholas Adcock (Denmark) Mikkel Jensen | Nissan 5.6 L V8 | M | 1 | DNF |
| 32 | LMP3 | 75 | (France) IDEC Sport | (France) Stéphane Adler (France) Patrice Lafargue | Ligier JS P320 | M | 0 | DNS |
| 32 | LMP3 | 75 | (France) IDEC Sport | (France) Stéphane Adler (France) Patrice Lafargue | Nissan 5.6 L V8 | M | 0 | DNS |
| 34 | GT3 | 51 | (Switzerland) Spirit of Race | (United States) Gunnar Jeannette (United States) Rodrigo Sales | Ferrari 488 GT3 | M | 0 | DNS |
| 34 | GT3 | 51 | (Switzerland) Spirit of Race | (United States) Gunnar Jeannette (United States) Rodrigo Sales | Ferrari F154CB 3.9 L Turbo V8 | M | 0 | DNS |

=== Race 2 ===
| Pos | Class | No. | Team | Drivers | Chassis | Tyre | Laps | Time/Reason |
| Pos | Class | No. | Team | Drivers | Engine | Tyre | Laps | Time/Reason |
|---|---|---|---|---|---|---|---|---|
| 1 | LMP3 | 37 | (Switzerland) Cool Racing | (France) Edouard Cauhaupe (France) Nicolas Maulini | Ligier JS P320 | M | 12 | 55:53.633 |
| 1 | LMP3 | 37 | (Switzerland) Cool Racing | (France) Edouard Cauhaupe (France) Nicolas Maulini | Nissan 5.6 L V8 | M | 12 | 55:53.633 |
| 2 | LMP3 | 3 | (Luxembourg) DKR Engineering | (Belgium) Jean Glorieux (Germany) Laurents Hörr | Duqueine M30 - D08 | M | 12 | +2.787 |
| 2 | LMP3 | 3 | (Luxembourg) DKR Engineering | (Belgium) Jean Glorieux (Germany) Laurents Hörr | Nissan 5.6 L V8 | M | 12 | +2.787 |
| 3 | LMP3 | 69 | (Switzerland) Cool Racing | (United Kingdom) Matt Bell (United States) Maurice Smith | Ligier JS P320 | M | 12 | +9.387 |
| 3 | LMP3 | 69 | (Switzerland) Cool Racing | (United Kingdom) Matt Bell (United States) Maurice Smith | Nissan 5.6 L V8 | M | 12 | +9.387 |
| 4 | LMP3 | 7 | (United Kingdom) Nielsen Racing | (United Kingdom) Colin Noble (United Kingdom) Anthony Wells | Duqueine M30 - D08 | M | 12 | +16.020 |
| 4 | LMP3 | 7 | (United Kingdom) Nielsen Racing | (United Kingdom) Colin Noble (United Kingdom) Anthony Wells | Nissan 5.6 L V8 | M | 12 | +16.020 |
| 5 | LMP3 | 26 | (France) Graff | (Liechtenstein) Matthias Kaiser (Finland) Rory Penttinen | Ligier JS P320 | M | 12 | +27.193 |
| 5 | LMP3 | 26 | (France) Graff | (Liechtenstein) Matthias Kaiser (Finland) Rory Penttinen | Nissan 5.6 L V8 | M | 12 | +27.193 |
| 6 | LMP3 | 15 | (United Kingdom) RLR MSport | (Canada) James Dayson (Denmark) Malthe Jakobsen | Ligier JS P320 | M | 12 | +41.361 |
| 6 | LMP3 | 15 | (United Kingdom) RLR MSport | (Canada) James Dayson (Denmark) Malthe Jakobsen | Nissan 5.6 L V8 | M | 12 | +41.361 |
| 8 | LMP3 | 27 | (France) MV2S Racing | (France) Christophe Cresp (France) Bruce Jouanny | Ligier JS P320 | M | 12 | +43.499 |
| 8 | LMP3 | 27 | (France) MV2S Racing | (France) Christophe Cresp (France) Bruce Jouanny | Nissan 5.6 L V8 | M | 12 | +43.499 |
| 8 | LMP3 | 11 | (Luxembourg) Racing Experience | (Luxembourg) David Hauser (France) Nicolas Melin | Duqueine M30 - D08 | M | 12 | +55.139 |
| 8 | LMP3 | 11 | (Luxembourg) Racing Experience | (Luxembourg) David Hauser (France) Nicolas Melin | Nissan 5.6 L V8 | M | 12 | +55.139 |
| 9 | LMP3 | 22 | (United Kingdom) United Autosports | (United States) Jim McGuire (United Kingdom) Duncan Tappy | Ligier JS P320 | M | 12 | +1:03.174 |
| 9 | LMP3 | 22 | (United Kingdom) United Autosports | (United States) Jim McGuire (United Kingdom) Duncan Tappy | Nissan 5.6 L V8 | M | 12 | +1:03.174 |
| 10 | LMP3 | 6 | (Spain) CD Sport | (France) Kevin Bole-Besançon (France) Jacques Wolff | Ligier JS P320 | M | 12 | +1:09.091 |
| 10 | LMP3 | 6 | (Spain) CD Sport | (France) Kevin Bole-Besançon (France) Jacques Wolff | Nissan 5.6 L V8 | M | 12 | +1:09.091 |
| 11 | LMP3 | 4 | (Switzerland) Realteam Racing | (Switzerland) David Droux (Switzerland) Esteban García | Ligier JS P320 | M | 12 | +1:10.930 |
| 11 | LMP3 | 4 | (Switzerland) Realteam Racing | (Switzerland) David Droux (Switzerland) Esteban García | Nissan 5.6 L V8 | M | 12 | +1:10.930 |
| 12 | GT3 | 63 | (China) Orange1 FFF Racing Team | (Italy) Andrea Caldarelli (Japan) Hiroshi Hamaguchi | Lamborghini Huracán GT3 Evo | M | 12 | +1:15.349 |
| 12 | GT3 | 63 | (China) Orange1 FFF Racing Team | (Italy) Andrea Caldarelli (Japan) Hiroshi Hamaguchi | Lamborghini 5.2 L V10 | M | 12 | +1:15.349 |
| 13 | GT3 | 74 | (Switzerland) Kessel Racing | (Poland) Michael Broniszewski (South Africa) David Perel | Ferrari 488 GT3 | M | 12 | +1:15.837 |
| 13 | GT3 | 74 | (Switzerland) Kessel Racing | (Poland) Michael Broniszewski (South Africa) David Perel | Ferrari F154CB 3.9 L Turbo V8 | M | 12 | +1:15.837 |
| 14 | LMP3 | 10 | (United Kingdom) Nielsen Racing | (Canada) Garett Grist (United States) Rob Hodes | Duqueine M30 - D08 | M | 12 | +1:24.938 |
| 14 | LMP3 | 10 | (United Kingdom) Nielsen Racing | (Canada) Garett Grist (United States) Rob Hodes | Nissan 5.6 L V8 | M | 12 | +1:24.938 |
| 15 | LMP3 | 24 | (United Kingdom) United Autosports | (United Kingdom) Andy Meyrick (Brazil) Daniel Schneider | Ligier JS P320 | M | 12 | +1:50.640 |
| 15 | LMP3 | 24 | (United Kingdom) United Autosports | (United Kingdom) Andy Meyrick (Brazil) Daniel Schneider | Nissan 5.6 L V8 | M | 12 | +1:50.640 |
| 16 | GT3 | 93 | (United Kingdom) Sky - Tempesta Racing | (United Kingdom) Chris Froggatt (Hong Kong) Jonathan Hui | Ferrari 488 GT3 | M | 12 | +2:06.116 |
| 16 | GT3 | 93 | (United Kingdom) Sky - Tempesta Racing | (United Kingdom) Chris Froggatt (Hong Kong) Jonathan Hui | Ferrari F154CB 3.9 L Turbo V8 | M | 12 | +2:06.116 |
| 17 | GT3 | 67 | (Switzerland) Kessel Racing | (Italy) Nicola Cadei (Turkey) Murat Cuhadaroglu | Ferrari 488 GT3 | M | 12 | +2:32.622 |
| 17 | GT3 | 67 | (Switzerland) Kessel Racing | (Italy) Nicola Cadei (Turkey) Murat Cuhadaroglu | Ferrari F154CB 3.9 L Turbo V8 | M | 12 | +2:32.622 |
| 18 | GT3 | 8 | (Italy) Iron Lynx | (Italy) Rino Mastronardi (Italy) Giacomo Piccini | Ferrari 488 GT3 | M | 12 | +3:02.709 |
| 18 | GT3 | 8 | (Italy) Iron Lynx | (Italy) Rino Mastronardi (Italy) Giacomo Piccini | Ferrari F154CB 3.9 L Turbo V8 | M | 12 | +3:02.709 |
| 19 | GT3 | 77 | (Italy) Iron Lynx | (Italy) Andrea Piccini (Italy) Claudio Schiavoni | Ferrari 488 GT3 | M | 12 | +3:07.497 |
| 19 | GT3 | 77 | (Italy) Iron Lynx | (Italy) Andrea Piccini (Italy) Claudio Schiavoni | Ferrari F154CB 3.9 L Turbo V8 | M | 12 | +3:07.497 |
| 20 | GT3 | 9 | (Italy) Iron Lynx | (Italy) Paolo Ruberti (Germany) Murad Sultanov | Ferrari 488 GT3 | M | 12 | +3:07.881 |
| 20 | GT3 | 9 | (Italy) Iron Lynx | (Italy) Paolo Ruberti (Germany) Murad Sultanov | Ferrari F154CB 3.9 L Turbo V8 | M | 12 | +3:07.881 |
| 21 | GT3 | 50 | (Switzerland) Kessel Racing | (United Kingdom) Oliver Hancock (United Kingdom) John Hartshorne | Ferrari 488 GT3 | M | 12 | +3:28.493 |
| 21 | GT3 | 50 | (Switzerland) Kessel Racing | (United Kingdom) Oliver Hancock (United Kingdom) John Hartshorne | Ferrari F154CB 3.9 L Turbo V8 | M | 12 | +3:28.493 |
| 22 | LMP3 | 75 | (France) IDEC Sport | (France) Stéphane Adler (France) Patrice Lafargue | Ligier JS P320 | M | 12 | +4:07.560 |
| 22 | LMP3 | 75 | (France) IDEC Sport | (France) Stéphane Adler (France) Patrice Lafargue | Nissan 5.6 L V8 | M | 12 | +4:07.560 |
| 23 | LMP3 | 66 | (Germany) Rinaldi Racing | (Germany) Steve Parrow (Germany) Dominik Schwager | Duqueine M30 - D08 | M | 12 | +5:01.508 |
| 23 | LMP3 | 66 | (Germany) Rinaldi Racing | (Germany) Steve Parrow (Germany) Dominik Schwager | Nissan 5.6 L V8 | M | 12 | +5:01.508 |
| 24 | LMP3 | 25 | (United Kingdom) United Autosports | (United Kingdom) Shaun Lynn (United Kingdom) Joe Macari | Ligier JS P320 | M | 11 | +1 Lap |
| 24 | LMP3 | 25 | (United Kingdom) United Autosports | (United Kingdom) Shaun Lynn (United Kingdom) Joe Macari | Nissan 5.6 L V8 | M | 11 | +1 Lap |
| 25 | LMP3 | 21 | (Belgium) Mühlner Motorsport | (Germany) Moritz Kranz (Belgium) Gilles Magnus | Duqueine M30 - D08 | M | 11 | +1 Lap |
| 25 | LMP3 | 21 | (Belgium) Mühlner Motorsport | (Germany) Moritz Kranz (Belgium) Gilles Magnus | Nissan 5.6 L V8 | M | 11 | +1 Lap |
| 26 | GT3 | 28 | (Belgium) Delahaye Racing Team | (France) Pierre-Etienne Bordet (France) Alexandre Viron | Porsche 997 GT3 R | M | 11 | +1 Lap |
| 26 | GT3 | 28 | (Belgium) Delahaye Racing Team | (France) Pierre-Etienne Bordet (France) Alexandre Viron | Porsche 4.0 L Flat-6 | M | 11 | +1 Lap |
| 27 | LMP3 | 14 | (United States) Eurointernational | (France) François Hériau (Finland) Niko Kari | Ligier JS P320 | M | 11 | +1 Lap |
| 27 | LMP3 | 14 | (United States) Eurointernational | (France) François Hériau (Finland) Niko Kari | Nissan 5.6 L V8 | M | 11 | +1 Lap |
| 28 | LMP3 | 55 | (Germany) Rinaldi Racing | (Germany) Alexander Mattschull (France) Nicolas Schatz | Duqueine M30 - D08 | M | 11 | +1 Lap |
| 28 | LMP3 | 55 | (Germany) Rinaldi Racing | (Germany) Alexander Mattschull (France) Nicolas Schatz | Nissan 5.6 L V8 | M | 11 | +1 Lap |
| 29 | LMP3 | 12 | (Poland) Team Virage | (Belgium) Tom Cloet (Australia) James Winslow | Ligier JS P320 | M | 11 | +1 Lap |
| 29 | LMP3 | 12 | (Poland) Team Virage | (Belgium) Tom Cloet (Australia) James Winslow | Nissan 5.6 L V8 | M | 11 | +1 Lap |
| 30 | GT3 | 51 | (Switzerland) Spirit of Race | (United States) Gunnar Jeannette (United States) Rodrigo Sales | Ferrari 488 GT3 | M | 10 | +2 Laps |
| 30 | GT3 | 51 | (Switzerland) Spirit of Race | (United States) Gunnar Jeannette (United States) Rodrigo Sales | Ferrari F154CB 3.9 L Turbo V8 | M | 10 | +2 Laps |
| 31 | LMP3 | 3 | (Luxembourg) DKR Engineering | (Belgium) Jean Glorieux (Germany) Laurents Hörr | Duqueine M30 - D08 | M | 8 | DNF |
| 31 | LMP3 | 3 | (Luxembourg) DKR Engineering | (Belgium) Jean Glorieux (Germany) Laurents Hörr | Nissan 5.6 L V8 | M | 8 | DNF |
| 32 | LMP3 | 23 | (United Kingdom) United Autosports | (United Kingdom) Wayne Boyd (United States) John Schauerman | Ligier JS P320 | M | 6 | +58.620 |
| 32 | LMP3 | 23 | (United Kingdom) United Autosports | (United Kingdom) Wayne Boyd (United States) John Schauerman | Nissan 5.6 L V8 | M | 6 | +58.620 |
| 33 | LMP3 | 5 | (Spain) CD Sport | (United Kingdom) Nicholas Adcock (Denmark) Mikkel Jensen | Ligier JS P320 | M | 4 | DNF |
| 33 | LMP3 | 5 | (Spain) CD Sport | (United Kingdom) Nicholas Adcock (Denmark) Mikkel Jensen | Nissan 5.6 L V8 | M | 4 | DNF |
| 34 | GT3 | 2 | (Switzerland) Porsche Centre Oberer Zürichsee by TFT | (France) Julien Andlauer (Switzerland) Nicolas Leutwiler | Porsche 911 GT3 R | M | 0 | DNS |
| 34 | GT3 | 2 | (Switzerland) Porsche Centre Oberer Zürichsee by TFT | (France) Julien Andlauer (Switzerland) Nicolas Leutwiler | Porsche 4.0 L Flat-6 | M | 0 | DNS |
