= Ligier European Series =

European sports car racing endurance series

- Category: Endurance racing
- Region: Europe
- Inaugural season: 2020
- Prototype classes: JS P4
- GT classes: JS2 R
- Tyre suppliers: Michelin
- Drivers' champion: JS P4 (United Kingdom) Haydn Chance (United Kingdom) Theo Micouris; JS2 R (France) David Caussanel (France) Louis Stern
- Teams' champion: JS P4: (Poland) Team Virage; JS2 R: (France) Pegasus Racing
- Official website: ligiereuropeanseries.com

The Ligier European Series is a European sports car racing endurance series inspired by the 24 Hours of Le Mans race and organized by Ligier Automotive in collaboration with the Automobile Club de l'Ouest (ACO). Created in 2020, it is a one-make championship, featuring Ligier JS P4 sports prototypes and Ligier JS2 R coupés. It races alongside the European Le Mans Series and Le Mans Cup, serving as the third tier in the ACO's global endurance racing ladder.

== Classes ==
The Ligier European Series is divided into two classes: JS P4 and JS2 R.

=== JS P4 ===
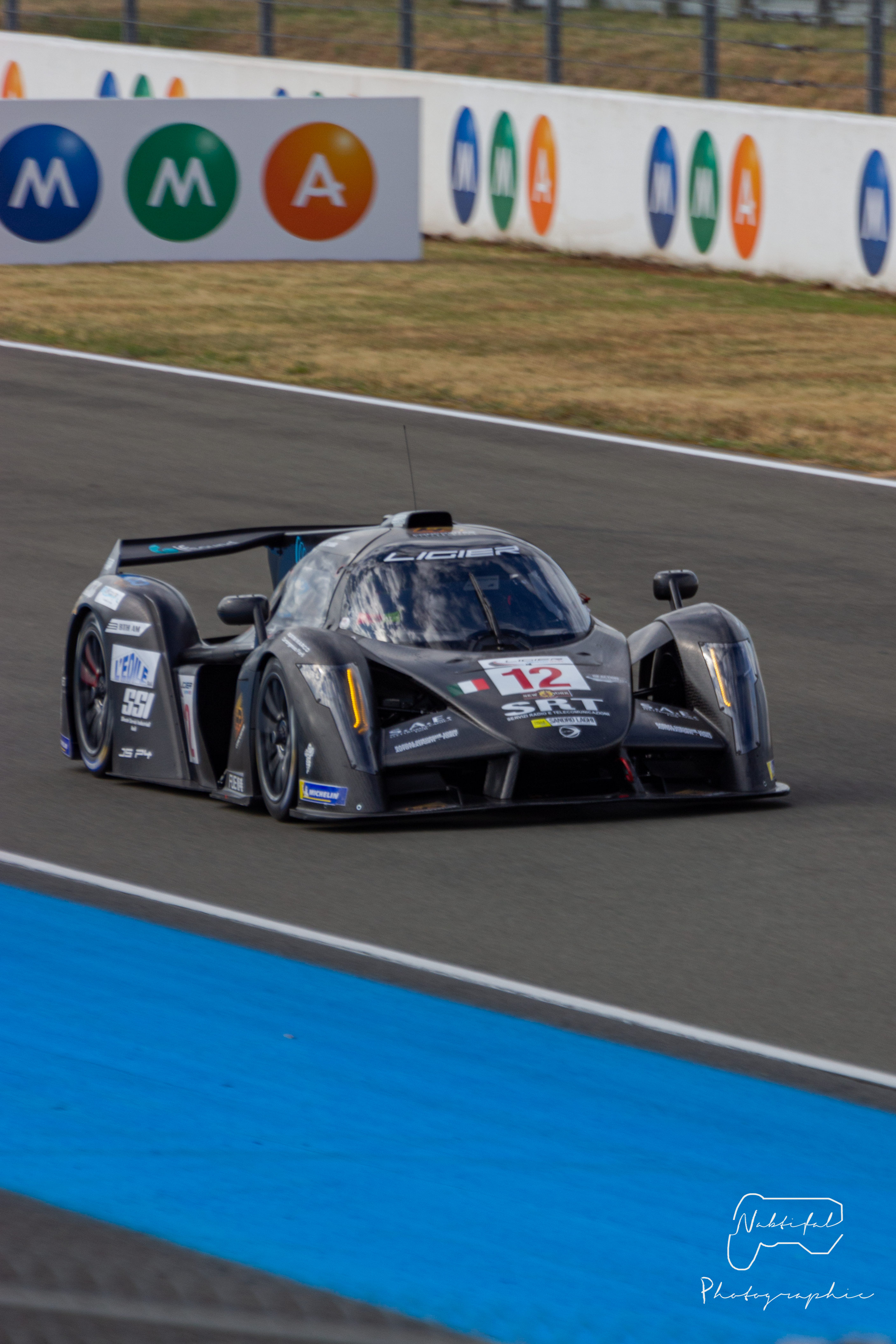
Masaki Tanaka's Ligier JS P4 at the Le Mans Heat in 2022

Built in 2017, the Ligier JS P4 is the sports prototype car of the championship, designed as a step between the Group CN and LMP3 categories. The car made its debut in the 2018 British LMP3 Cup and features a carbon fibre composite monocoque and body, as well as LMP3-based brake discs and calipers.

Specifications:

- Engine displacement: Ford Duratec 3.7 L (226 cu in)
- Gearbox: 6-speed paddle shift sequential semi-automatic gearbox
- Weight: 920 kg (2,028 lb)
- Power output: 385 hp (287 kW)
- Aspiration: Naturally-aspirated
- Length: 4,680 mm (184 in)
- Width: 1,900 mm (75 in)
- Wheelbase: 2,860 mm (113 in)
- Tyres: Michelin

=== JS2 R ===
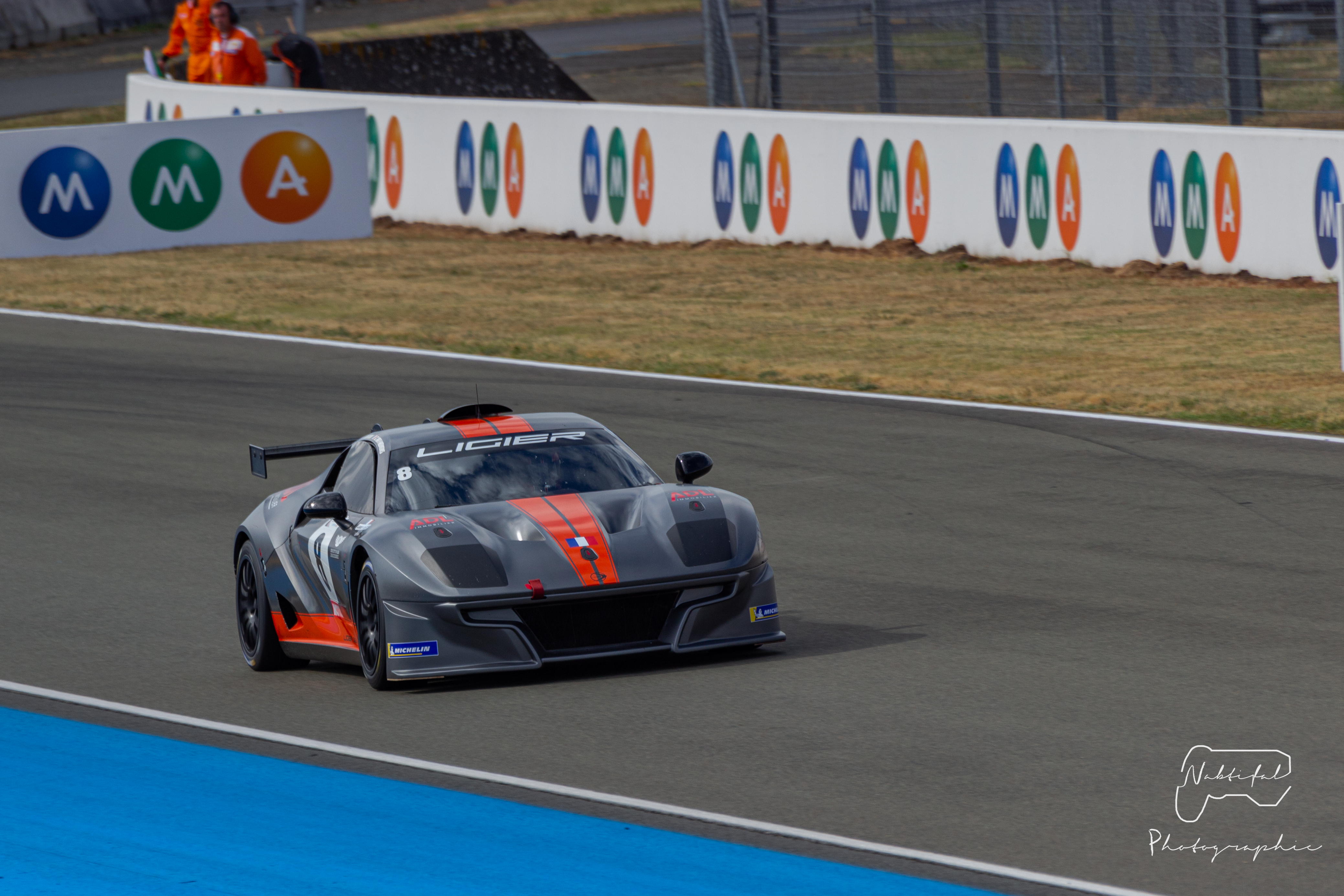
Pôle Position 81's Ligier JS2 R at the Le Mans Heat in 2022

Released for track use in 2018, Ligier's 50th anniversary year, the Ligier JS2 R makes up the Grand Touring class of the series. Intended as a revival of the classic Ligier JS2, the car is a mid-engined, 2-door coupé borrowing several design cues from its predecessor.

Specifications:

- Engine displacement: Ford Duratec 3.7 L (226 cu in)
- Gearbox: 6-speed paddle shift sequential manual gearbox
- Weight: 1,055 kg (2,326 lb)
- Power output: 350 hp (261 kW)
- Aspiration: Naturally-aspirated
- Length: 4,415 mm (174 in)
- Width: 1,900 mm (75 in)
- Wheelbase: 2,680 mm (106 in)
- Tyres: Michelin

Both vehicles share the same 3.7-litre, naturally-aspirated Ford Duratec V6 engine coupled with Michelin tyres and a 6-speed Quaife sequential transmission, semi-automatic in the case of the JS P4 and manual for the JS2 R. Upgrade kits for both cars were introduced in 2022.

== Champions ==
=== JS P4 ===
Season	Drivers	Team	Poles	Wins	Podiums	Points	Clinched	Margin	Ref(s)
2020	(Italy) Andrea Dromedari	(Italy) HP Racing Team	3	3	10	195	8 of 10	12	
2021	(Italy) Jacopo Faccioni (Italy) Alessandro Cicognani	(Italy) HP Racing by Monzagarage	8	7	10	223	10 of 12	18	
2022	(France) Gillian Henrion	(Poland) Team Virage	12	11	12	293	10 of 12	93	
2023	(Romania) Mihnea Ștefan	(Poland) Team Virage	6	7	8	216	9 of 11	49	
2024	(United Kingdom) Haydn Chance (United Kingdom) Theo Micouris	(Poland) Team Virage	3	3	9	200	11 of 11	21	
2025	(United Kingdom) Maxwell Dodds (France) Iko Segret	(France) ANS Motorsport	3	3	8	172	11 of 11	9	

=== JS2 R ===
Season	Drivers	Team	Poles	Wins	Podiums	Points	Clinched	Margin	Ref(s)
2020	(France) Sébastien Baud	(Switzerland) Cool Racing	2	4	8	169	10 of 10	21	
2021	(France) Natan Bihel	(France) M Racing	10	7	11	259	12 of 12	27	
2022	(Kuwait) Haytham Qarajouli	(United Kingdom) RLR MSport		5	7	185	10 of 12	39	
2023	(France) Julien Lemoine	(France) ANS Motorsport	3	7	10	229	10 of 11	48	
2024	(France) Julien Schell (France) David Caussanel	(France) Pegasus Racing	0	1	9	163	11 of 11	15	
2025	(Italy) Simone Riccitelli	(Italy) LR Motorsport	5	5	9	191	11 of 11	3	

== Circuits ==
- (France) Circuit Paul Ricard (2020–present)
- (Belgium) Circuit de Spa-Francorchamps (2020–present)
- (Italy) Monza Circuit (2020–2022)
- (Portugal) Algarve International Circuit (2020–present)
- (Spain) Circuit de Barcelona-Catalunya (2021, 2023–present)
- (Austria) Red Bull Ring (2021)
- (Italy) Imola Circuit (2022)
- (France) Circuit de la Sarthe (2022–present)
- (Spain) MotorLand Aragón (2023)
- (Italy) Mugello Circuit (2024)
- (United Kingdom) Silverstone Circuit (2025)
