= 2018 British LMP3 Cup =

The 2018 LMP3 Cup Championship was the second season for the British LMP3 Cup. The calendar was announced on 10 November 2017, with the same venues as the previous year, but in a different order. The series finale was held at Silverstone, one month later than in 2017.

Michelin supplied the tyres, a change from Pirelli in 2017, and French manufacturer Norma campaigned an M30 chassis, the first non-Ligier JS P3 in the series.

== Teams ==
Team	Chassis	Engine	No	Driver(s)	Rounds	Class
(United Kingdom) Ecurie Ecosse / Nielsen Racing	Ligier JS P3	Nissan VK50VE	1	(United Kingdom) Colin Noble	All	LMP3
(United Kingdom) Ecurie Ecosse / Nielsen Racing	Ligier JS P3	Nissan VK50VE	1	(United Kingdom) Tony Wells	All	LMP3
(United Kingdom) Ecurie Ecosse / Nielsen Racing	Ligier JS P3	Nissan VK50VE	7	(Denmark) Christian Olsen	1, 6	LMP3
(United Kingdom) Ecurie Ecosse / Nielsen Racing	Ligier JS P3	Nissan VK50VE	7	(United Kingdom) Nick Adcock	6	LMP3
(United Kingdom) Red River Sport	Ligier JS P3	Nissan VK50VE	2	(United Kingdom) Johnny Mowlem	1–4, 6	LMP3
(United Kingdom) Red River Sport	Ligier JS P3	Nissan VK50VE	2	(United Kingdom) Bonamy Grimes	1–4, 6	LMP3
(United Kingdom) Mectech Motorsport	Norma M30	Nissan VK50VE	21	(United Kingdom) Bradley Smith	All	LMP3
(United Kingdom) Mectech Motorsport	Norma M30	Nissan VK50VE	21	(United Kingdom) Duncan Williams	All	LMP3
(United Kingdom) 360 Racing	Ligier JS P3	Nissan VK50VE	23	(United Kingdom) Jason Rishover	1–2	LMP3
(United Kingdom) 360 Racing	Ligier JS P3	Nissan VK50VE	23	(United Kingdom) Jamie Spence	1–2	LMP3
(United States) United Autosports	Ligier JS P4	Ford 3.7L V6 Supercharged	32	(United Kingdom) Charlie Hollings	1	PT4
(United States) United Autosports	Ligier JS P4	Ford 3.7L V6 Supercharged	32	(United Kingdom) Andrew Bentley	1	PT4
(United Kingdom) Speedworks Motorsport	Ligier JS P3	Nissan VK50VE	96	(United Kingdom) Jack Butel	All	LMP3
(United Kingdom) Speedworks Motorsport	Ligier JS P3	Nissan VK50VE	96	(United Kingdom) Dominic Paul	All	LMP3

== Races ==
Round		Circuit	Date	Pole position	Winners
1	R1	(United Kingdom) Donington Park (National Circuit, Leicestershire)	21–22 April	(United Kingdom) No. 1 Ecurie Ecosse/Nielsen Racing (United Kingdom) Colin Noble (United Kingdom) Tony Wells	(United Kingdom) No. 7 Ecurie Ecosse/Nielsen Racing (Denmark) Christian Olsen
1	R2	(United Kingdom) Donington Park (National Circuit, Leicestershire)	21–22 April	(United Kingdom) No. 21 Mectech Motorsport (United Kingdom) Bradley Smith (United Kingdom) Duncan Williams	(United Kingdom) No. 21 Mectech Motorsport (United Kingdom) Bradley Smith (United Kingdom) Duncan Williams
2	R4	(United Kingdom) Brands Hatch (Grand Prix Circuit, Kent)	19–20 May	(United Kingdom) No. 21 Mectech Motorsport (United Kingdom) Bradley Smith (United Kingdom) Duncan Williams	(United Kingdom) No. 1 Ecurie Ecosse/Nielsen Racing (United Kingdom) Colin Noble (United Kingdom) Tony Wells
2	R5	(United Kingdom) Brands Hatch (Grand Prix Circuit, Kent)	19–20 May	(United Kingdom) No. 21 Mectech Motorsport (United Kingdom) Bradley Smith (United Kingdom) Duncan Williams	(United Kingdom) No. 1 Ecurie Ecosse/Nielsen Racing (United Kingdom) Colin Noble (United Kingdom) Tony Wells
3	R5	Spa Francochamps (Stavelot, Belgium)	2 June	(United Kingdom) No. 1 Ecurie Ecosse/Nielsen Racing (United Kingdom) Colin Noble (United Kingdom) Tony Wells	(United Kingdom) No. 1 Ecurie Ecosse/Nielsen Racing (United Kingdom) Colin Noble (United Kingdom) Tony Wells
3	R6	Spa Francochamps (Stavelot, Belgium)	3 June	(United Kingdom) No. 1 Ecurie Ecosse/Nielsen Racing (United Kingdom) Colin Noble (United Kingdom) Tony Wells	(United Kingdom) No. 21 Mectech Motorsport (United Kingdom) Bradley Smith (United Kingdom) Duncan Williams
4	R7	(United Kingdom) Snetterton Circuit (300 Circuit, Norfolk)	30 June	(United Kingdom) No. 1 Ecurie Ecosse/Nielsen Racing (United Kingdom) Colin Noble (United Kingdom) Tony Wells	(United Kingdom) No. 1 Ecurie Ecosse/Nielsen Racing (United Kingdom) Colin Noble (United Kingdom) Tony Wells
4	R8	(United Kingdom) Snetterton Circuit (300 Circuit, Norfolk)	1 July	(United Kingdom) No. 96 Speedworks Motorsport (United Kingdom) Jack Butel (United Kingdom) Dominic Paul	(United Kingdom) No. 1 Ecurie Ecosse/Nielsen Racing (United Kingdom) Colin Noble (United Kingdom) Tony Wells
5	R9	(United Kingdom) Donington Park (Grand Prix Circuit, Leicestershire)	8 September	(United Kingdom) No. 21 Mectech Motorsport (United Kingdom) Bradley Smith (United Kingdom) Duncan Williams	(United Kingdom) No. 21 Mectech Motorsport (United Kingdom) Bradley Smith (United Kingdom) Duncan Williams
5	R10	(United Kingdom) Donington Park (Grand Prix Circuit, Leicestershire)	9 September	(United Kingdom) No. 1 Ecurie Ecosse/Nielsen Racing (United Kingdom) Colin Noble (United Kingdom) Tony Wells	(United Kingdom) No. 1 Ecurie Ecosse/Nielsen Racing (United Kingdom) Colin Noble (United Kingdom) Tony Wells
6	R11	(United Kingdom) Silverstone Circuit (Grand Prix Circuit, Northamptonshire)	13 October	(United Kingdom) No. 7 Ecurie Ecosse/Nielsen Racing (Denmark) Christian Olsen (United Kingdom) Nick Adcock	(United Kingdom) No. 21 Mectech Motorsport (United Kingdom) Bradley Smith (United Kingdom) Duncan Williams
6	R12	(United Kingdom) Silverstone Circuit (Grand Prix Circuit, Northamptonshire)	14 October	(United Kingdom) No. 7 Ecurie Ecosse/Nielsen Racing (Denmark) Christian Olsen (United Kingdom) Nick Adcock	(United Kingdom) No. 21 Mectech Motorsport (United Kingdom) Bradley Smith (United Kingdom) Duncan Williams
