= Ligier JS P4 =

French sports car

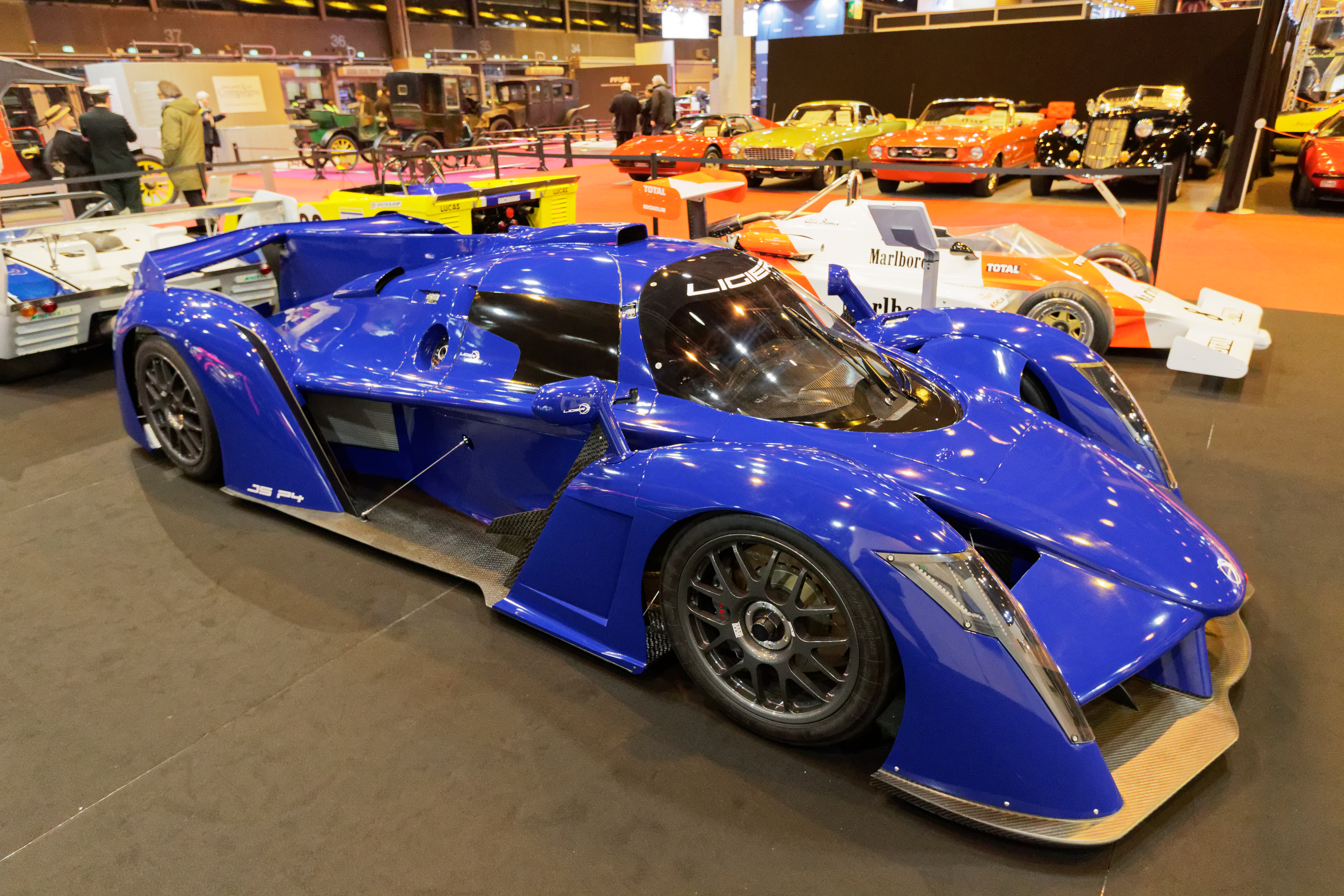
- Designer(s): Simon Cox

Technical specifications
- Chassis: Carbon fiber composite monocoque, carbon-composite body
- Suspension (front): Double wishbone, pushrod-actuated coil springs over three-way adjustable shock absorbers, anti-roll bars
- Length: 4,680 mm (184 in)
- Width: 1,900 mm (75 in)
- Wheelbase: 2,860 mm (113 in)
- Engine: Ford Duratec 3.7 L (230 cu in) 24-valve 60° DOHC V6 naturally-aspirated mid-engined
- Transmission: Quaife 6-speed semi-automatic sequential
- Brakes: LMP3 6-piston front and rear calipers 355x32 mm front and rear LMP3 discs

Competition history
- Debut: 2018 British LMP3 Cup

The Ligier JS P4 is an entry-level sports prototype race car, designed, developed, and produced by French manufacturer Onroak Automotive, and named in partnership with former French driver Guy Ligier, and used for the top class of the Ligier European Series.

== History ==
The car was first unveiled in 2017, at the 2017 24 Hours of Le Mans. It was homologated in the FIA Free Formula cars (Group E) category, and sits between the Group CN and LMP3 performance window. The car made its debut in the 2018 British LMP3 Cup in its own P4 class. The car is primarily used in the Ligier European series. In 2022, the car received an update kit to improve the engine and the brakes. The engine power was increased from 330 hp to 385 hp. These upgrades were mandatory for all teams competing in the Ligier European Series.
