= 2021 Road to Le Mans =

Automobile endurance event

Circuit de la Sarthe track

The 6th Road to Le Mans was an automobile endurance event that took place on 19 and 21 August 2021, at the Circuit de la Sarthe, Le Mans, France. The race features LMP3 and GT3 category cars competing in their respective classes.

== Entry list ==
Icon	Series
MLMS	Michelin Le Mans Cup
ELMS	European Le Mans Series
GTWC	SRO GT World Challenge
ALMS	Asian Le Mans Series
RLMS	Road to Le Mans only

No.	Entrant	Car	Series	Driver 1	Driver 2
LMP3 (35 entries)
1	(Luxembourg) DKR Engineering	Duqueine M30 - D08 - Nissan	RLMS	(Australia) Nathan Kumar	(Switzerland) Marcello Marateotto
3	(Luxembourg) DKR Engineering	Duqueine M30 - D08 - Nissan	MLMS	(Belgium) Jean Glorieux	(Germany) Laurents Hörr
5	(Germany) Phoenix Racing	Ligier JS P320 - Nissan	MLMS	(Germany) Finn Gehrsitz	(Germany) Hamza Owega
7	(United Kingdom) Nielsen Racing	Ligier JS P320 - Nissan	MLMS	(United Kingdom) Colin Noble	(United Kingdom) Anthony Wells
11	(Germany) Wochenspiegel Team Monschau	Duqueine M30 - D08 - Nissan	MLMS	(Germany) Torsten Kratz	(Germany) Leonard Weiss
12	(Germany) Black Falcon	Ligier JS P320 - Nissan	MLMS	(Germany) Donar Munding	(Germany) Maik Rosenberg
14	(United Kingdom) RLR MSport	Ligier JS P320 - Nissan	ELMS	(United Kingdom) Mike Benham	(Denmark) Malthe Jakobsen
15	(United Kingdom) RLR MSport	Ligier JS P320 - Nissan	ELMS	(United Kingdom) Alex Kapadia	(United Kingdom) Martin Rich
16	(Poland) Team Virage	Ligier JS P320 - Nissan	MLMS	(France) Sacha Lehmann	(Germany) Matthias Lüthen
17	(France) IDEC Sport	Ligier JS P320 - Nissan	MLMS	(France) Dimitri Enjalbert	(France) Patrice Lafargue
18	(Belgium) Mühlner Motorsport	Duqueine M30 - D08 - Nissan	MLMS	(Australia) Andres Latorre	(Australia) Garnet Patterson
19	(Switzerland) Cool Racing	Ligier JS P320 - Nissan	ELMS	(France) Mathieu De Barbuat	(Germany) Niklas Krütten
20	(United Kingdom) Grainmarket Racing	Duqueine M30 - D08 - Nissan	MLMS	(United Kingdom) Mark Crader	(United Kingdom) Alex Mortimer
21	(Belgium) Mühlner Motorsport	Duqueine M30 - D08 - Nissan	MLMS	(Germany) Moritz Kranz	(Belgium) Ugo de Wilde
22	(United Kingdom) United Autosports	Ligier JS P320 - Nissan	MLMS	(Australia) Scott Andrews	(United States) Gerald Kraut
23	(United Kingdom) United Autosports	Ligier JS P320 - Nissan	MLMS	(United States) John Schauerman	(United Kingdom) Duncan Tappy
25	(Switzerland) Racing Spirit of Léman	Ligier JS P320 - Nissan	MLMS	(France) Théo Chalal	(France) Jacques Wolff
26	(United Kingdom) United Autosports	Ligier JS P320 - Nissan	RLMS	(United States) Jim McGuire	(United Kingdom) Guy Smith
27	(United Kingdom) Nielsen Racing	Ligier JS P320 - Nissan	ELMS	(United Kingdom) Nick Adcock	(Netherlands) Max Koebolt
28	(United Kingdom) Nielsen Racing	Ligier JS P320 - Nissan	RLMS	(United States) Tristan Nunez	(United States) Steven Thomas
29	(Australia) Revere Lifestyle	ADESS-03 Evo - Nissan	RLMS	(France) Simon Escallier	(United States) John Falb
30	(Germany) Frikadelli Racing Team	Ligier JS P320 - Nissan	MLMS	(Germany) Klaus Abbelen	(Zimbabwe) Axcil Jefferies
31	(Italy) AF Corse	Ligier JS P320 - Nissan	MLMS	(Portugal) Rui Águas	(Greece) Kriton Lendoudis
32	(United Kingdom) United Autosports	Ligier JS P320 - Nissan	MLMS	(United Kingdom) Andy Meyrick	(Brazil) Daniel Schneider
33	(Spain) CD Sport	Ligier JS P320 - Nissan	MLMS	(France) Adam Eteki	(Denmark) Mikkel Jensen
37	(Switzerland) Cool Racing	Ligier JS P320 - Nissan	MLMS	(France) Antoine Doquin	(United Kingdom) Josh Skelton
52	(Switzerland) Racing Spirit of Léman	Ligier JS P320 - Nissan	RLMS	(United Kingdom) Ian Loggie	(Netherlands) Tijmen van der Helm
55	(Germany) Rinaldi Racing	Duqueine M30 - D08 - Nissan	MLMS	(Germany) Steve Parrow	(Germany) Dominik Schwager
66	(Germany) Rinaldi Racing	Duqueine M30 - D08 - Nissan	MLMS	(Germany) Alexander Mattschull	(Argentina) Nicolás Varrone
69	(Switzerland) Cool Racing	Ligier JS P320 - Nissan	MLMS	(United Kingdom) Matt Bell	(United States) Maurice Smith
71	(Poland) Team Virage	Ligier JS P320 - Nissan	MLMS	(Canada) Garett Grist	(United States) Rob Hodes
73	(Italy) TS Corse	Duqueine M30 - D08 - Nissan	MLMS	(Republic of Ireland) Cian Carey	(Italy) Pietro Peccenini
74	(France) MV2S Racing	Ligier JS P320 - Nissan	ELMS	(France) Sebastien Baud	(France) Christophe Cresp
77	(Iceland) Team Thor	Ligier JS P320 - Nissan	MLMS	(United Kingdom) Tom Ashton	(Iceland) Auðunn Guðmundsson
98	(Belgium) Motorsport98	Ligier JS P320 - Nissan	MLMS	(Belgium) Eric De Doncker	(France) Dino Lundardi
GT3 (11 entries)
2	(Switzerland) Porsche Centre Oberer Zürichsee by TFT	Porsche 911 GT3 R	MLMS	(France) Julien Andlauer	(Switzerland) Nicolas Leutwiler
8	(Italy) Iron Lynx	Ferrari 488 GT3 Evo 2020	MLMS	(Finland) Rory Penttinen	(United States) Logan Sargeant
9	(Italy) Iron Lynx	Ferrari 488 GT3 Evo 2020	ELMS	(Italy) Manuela Gostner	(France) Doriane Pin
34	(United Kingdom) ROFGO Racing with Team WRT	Audi R8 LMS Evo	GTWC	(Germany) Benjamin Goethe	(Germany) Roald Goethe
51	(Italy) AF Corse	Ferrari 488 GT3 Evo 2020	MLMS	(Japan) Kenji Abe	(Italy) Eddie Cheever III
61	(Italy) AF Corse	Ferrari 488 GT3 Evo 2020	RLMS	(Italy) Gino Forgione	(Italy) Andrea Montermini
62	(Italy) AF Corse	Ferrari 488 GT3 Evo 2020	MLMS	(France) Franck Dezoteux	(France) Stephane Tribaudini
72	(Belgium) Belgian Audi Club Team WRT	Audi R8 LMS Evo	GTWC	(Switzerland) Jean-Denis Delétraz	(Belgium) Charles Weerts
83	(France) Racetivity	Mercedes-AMG GT3 Evo	RLMS	(France) Emmanuel Collard	(France) Charles-Henri Samani
92	(Germany) Herberth Motorsport	Porsche 911 GT3 R	ALMS	(Germany) Jürgen Häring	(Germany) Alfred Renauer
97	Oman Racing Team with TF Sport	Aston Martin Vantage AMR GT3	ALMS	(Oman) Ahmad Al Harthy	(United States) Michael Dinan

== Qualifying ==
Provisional pole positions in each class are denoted in bold.

=== Race 1 ===
Pos.	Class	No.	Team	Qualifying	Grid
1	LMP3	3	**DKR Engineering**	**3:44.352**	1
2	LMP3	21	Mühlner Motorsport	3:45.079	2
3	LMP3	66	Rinaldi Racing	3:45.769	3
4	LMP3	69	Cool Racing	3:46.438	4
5	LMP3	71	Team Virage	3:46.636	5
6	LMP3	7	Nielsen Racing	3:47.116	6
7	LMP3	98	Motorsport98	3:47.249	7
8	LMP3	16	Team Virage	3:47.310	8
9	LMP3	22	United Autosports	3:47.449	9
10	LMP3	23	United Autosports	3:47.478	10
11	LMP3	19	Cool Racing	3:47.611	11
12	LMP3	18	Mühlner Motorsport	3:47.652	12
13	LMP3	32	United Autosports	3:47.776	13
14	LMP3	27	Nielsen Racing	3:48.543	14
15	LMP3	26	United Autosports	3:48.669	15
16	LMP3	17	IDEC Sport	3:48.719	16
17	LMP3	12	Black Falcon	3:48.738	17
18	LMP3	37	Cool Racing	3:48.830	18
19	LMP3	33	CD Sport	3:49.127	19
20	LMP3	14	RLR MSport	3:49.233	20
21	LMP3	11	Wochenspiegel Team Monschau	3:49.554	21
22	LMP3	30	Frikadelli Racing Team	3:49.615	22
23	LMP3	15	RLR MSport	3:49.638	23
24	LMP3	73	TS Corse	3:50.159	24
25	LMP3	20	Grainmarket Racing	3:50.263	25
26	LMP3	77	Team Thor	3:52.273	26
27	LMP3	74	MV2S Racing	3:52.929	27
28	LMP3	25	Racing Spirit of Léman	3:53.430	28
29	GT3	2	**Porsche Centre Oberer Zürichsee by TFT**	**3:54.392**	29
30	GT3	8	Iron Lynx	3:55.240	30
31	GT3	51	AF Corse	3:55.419	31
32	LMP3	28	Nielsen Racing	3:56.175	32
33	GT3	9	Iron Lynx	3:56.200	33
34	GT3	72	Belgian Audi Club Team WRT	3:56.267	34
35	GT3	61	AF Corse	3:56.397	35
36	LMP3	1	DKR Engineering	3:57.112	36
37	GT3	83	Racetivity	3:57.653	37
38	GT3	95	Oman Racing Team with TF Sport	3:58.238	38
39	GT3	34	ROFGO Racing with Team WRT	3:59.309	39
40	LMP3	29	Revere Lifestyle	3:59.880	40
41	LMP3	55	Rinaldi Racing	4:01.298	41
42	GT3	92	Herberth Motorsport	4:07.783	42
43	GT3	62	AF Corse	4:09.681	43
44	LMP3	5	Phoenix Racing	No time	44
45	LMP3	52	Racing Spirit of Léman	No time	45
46	LMP3	31	AF Corse	No time	46

=== Race 2 ===
Pos.	Class	No.	Team	Qualifying	Grid
1	LMP3	21	**Mühlner Motorsport**	**3:47.389**	1
2	LMP3	3	DKR Engineering	3:49.821	2
3	LMP3	37	Cool Racing	3:50.051	3
4	LMP3	11	Wochenspiegel Team Monschau	3:50.422	4
5	LMP3	19	Cool Racing	3:50.432	5
6	LMP3	66	Rinaldi Racing	3:51.356	6
7	LMP3	14	RLR MSport	3:51.474	7
8	LMP3	1	DKR Engineering	3:53.105	8
9	LMP3	16	Team Virage	3:53.637	9
10	LMP3	69	Cool Racing	3:53.684	10
11	LMP3	7	Nielsen Racing	3:53.693	11
12	LMP3	25	Racing Spirit of Léman	3:54.117	12
13	LMP3	71	Team Virage	3:54.181	13
14	LMP3	17	IDEC Sport	3:55.391	14
15	LMP3	28	Nielsen Racing	3:55.507	15
16	LMP3	32	United Autosports	3:56.050	16
17	LMP3	23	United Autosports	3:56.145	17
18	LMP3	98	Motorsport98	3:56.152	18
19	LMP3	77	Team Thor	3:56.272	19
20	LMP3	26	United Autosports	3:56.593	20
21	LMP3	73	TS Corse	3:56.951	21
22	LMP3	27	Nielsen Racing	3:57.503	22
23	LMP3	55	Rinaldi Racing	3:57.670	23
24	GT3	8	**Iron Lynx**	**3:57.721**	24
25	GT3	95	Oman Racing Team with TF Sport	3:58.074	25
26	LMP3	74	MV2S Racing	3:58.226	26
27	GT3	2	Porsche Centre Oberer Zürichsee by TFT	3:58.556	27
28	LMP3	15	RLR MSport	3:58.939	28
29	LMP3	22	United Autosports	3:58.991	29
30	LMP3	33	CD Sport	3:59.223	30
31	LMP3	29	Revere Lifestyle	3:59.346	31
32	LMP3	20	Grainmarket Racing	3:59.511	32
33	LMP3	18	Mühlner Motorsport	3:59.669	33
34	LMP3	52	Racing Spirit of Léman	3:59.864	34
35	LMP3	12	Black Falcon	3:59.956	35
36	GT3	72	Belgian Audi Club Team WRT	4:01.265	36
37	GT3	9	Iron Lynx	4:02.379	37
38	LMP3	30	Frikadelli Racing Team	4:02.549	38
39	GT3	61	AF Corse	4:03.733	39
40	GT3	83	Racetivity	4:05.474	40
41	GT3	62	AF Corse	4:05.869	41
42	GT3	92	Herberth Motorsport	4:07.785	42
43	GT3	51	AF Corse	4:08.332	43
44	GT3	34	ROFGO Racing with Team WRT	4:10.858	44
45	LMP3	5	Phoenix Racing	No time	45
46	LMP3	31	AF Corse	No time	46

== Races ==
=== Race 1 ===
Pos	Class	No.	Team	Drivers	Chassis	Tyre	Laps	Time/Reason
Pos	Class	No.	Team	Drivers	Engine	Tyre	Laps	Time/Reason

=== Race 2 ===
Pos	Class	No.	Team	Drivers	Chassis	Tyre	Laps	Time/Reason
Pos	Class	No.	Team	Drivers	Engine	Tyre	Laps	Time/Reason
