= Bradley Smith (racing driver) =

British racing driver

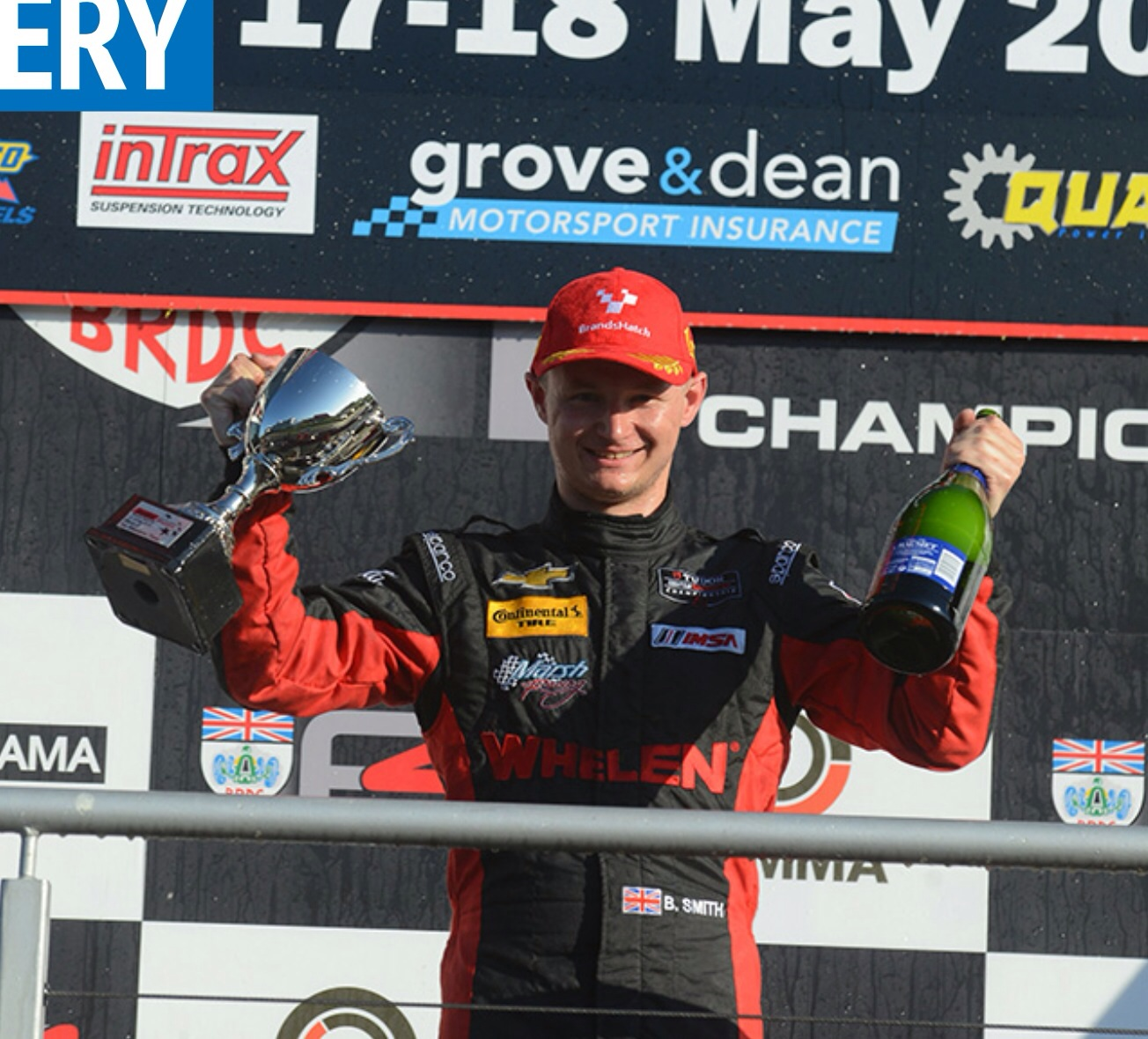
- Smith in 2014
- Nationality: British
- Born: 21 February 1991 (age 35) Billericay, Essex, England

Radical European Masters career
- Current team: Mectech Motorsport
- Categorisation: FIA Silver
- Starts: 24
- Wins: 21
- Podiums: 26
- Poles: 19

Awards
- 2014: Sunoco Rolex 24 at Daytona Challenge

Bradley Smith (born 21 February 1991) is a former British Racing Drivers' Club (BRDC) Rising Star and sports car driver from Essex, United Kingdom.

Smith is the Sunoco Prize winner and raced in the Rolex 24 at Daytona in 2014.

== Career ==
Starting in go-karts at the young age of eight, Smith began to win races at Club, National and European Level. Moving to sports cars in 2011, Smith experienced half a season and was able to outdrive his 2004 car to gain top-ten places.

In 2012, Smith competed in a Radical SR3 RS 260 hp car in the Clubman Cup, where he won the championship in his first year.

Smith then moved to the endurance Radical SR3 challenge for 2013, where he took his second championship. In 2014, he made his European debut in a V8 with a second at Nürburgring and his maiden European win at Brands Hatch. A highly successful batch of races saw Smith becoming European Champion in 2014 at his first attempt.

In 2015, Smith became a Grade A ARDS instructor.

== Races ==
2014 24 Hours of Daytona

2015 Ginetta G55 Supercup race winner

2014 Radical European Masters Champion

2013 Radical SR3 Challenge Champion

2012 Radical SR3 Clubman Cup Champion
