= Rodrigo Sales =

American businessman and racing driver (born 1973)

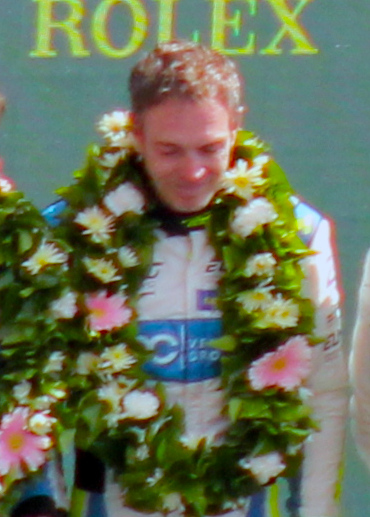
- Sales on the podium of the 2025 24 Hours of Le Mans
- Nationality: (United States) American (Mexico) Mexican via dual nationality
- Born: Rodrigo Rafael Sales; 2 November 1973 (age 53) Sonoma, California, U.S.

European Le Mans Series career
- Debut season: 2020
- Current team: Nielsen Racing
- Categorisation: FIA Bronze
- Car number: 24
- Starts: 16 (16 entries)
- Wins: 0
- Podiums: 0
- Poles: 0
- Fastest laps: 0
- Best finish: 11th (LMGTE) in 2020

Rodrigo Rafael Sales (born 2 November 1973) is an American-Mexican businessman and part-time racing driver.

Sales became the Asian Le Mans Series champion in 2022 alongside Matt Bell and Ben Hanley.

== Racing record ==
=== Racing career summary ===
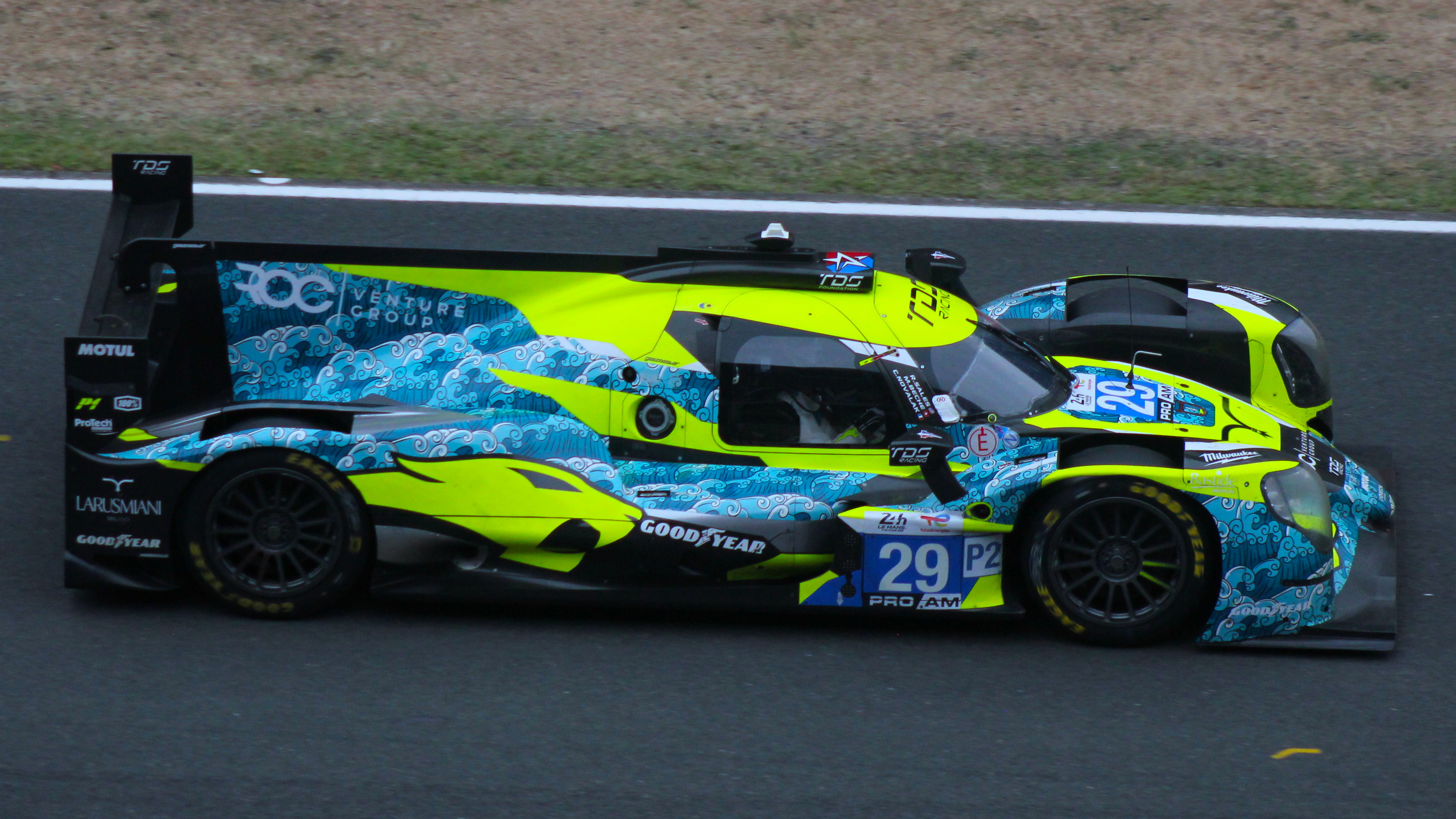
Sales' No. 29 car at the 2025 24 Hours of Le Mans

Season	Series	Team	Races	Wins	Poles	F/Laps	Podiums	Points	Position
2017	Pirelli World Challenge - TC	Stephen Cameron Racing	11	0	0	0	0	62	14th
2018	IMSA SportsCar Challenge - TC	Compass Racing	10	3	0	0	7	305	**2nd**
2019	Michelin Pilot Challenge - GS	eEuroparts.com Rowe Racing	5	0	0	0	0	62	40th
2020	European Le Mans Series - LMGTE	JMW Motorsport	4	0	0	0	0	26	11th
2020	Le Mans Cup - GT3	Spirit of Race	1	0	0	0	0	3	16th
2021	Asian Le Mans Series - LMP3	Nielsen Racing	4	0	0	0	2	39	5th
2021	European Le Mans Series - LMGTE	JMW Motorsport	6	0	0	0	0	52	8th
2021	24 Hours of Le Mans - LMGTE Am	JMW Motorsport	1	0	0	0	0	N/A	DNF
2021	GT World Challenge America - Pro-Am	Compass Racing	5	0	1	0	1	37	17th
2021	GT America Series - GT3	Compass Racing	2	0	0	0	2	0	NC†
2021	IMSA SportsCar Championship - LMP3	WIN Autosport	1	0	0	0	0	274	30th
2021	24H TCE Series - TCR	Simpson Motorsport	1	0	0	0	0	0	NC†
2022	Asian Le Mans Series - LMP2	Nielsen Racing	4	2	0	0	4	104	**1st**
2022	European Le Mans Series - LMP2	Nielsen Racing	6	0	0	0	0	15	16th
2022	24 Hours of Le Mans - LMP2	Nielsen Racing	1	0	0	0	0	N/A	16th
2023	Asian Le Mans Series - LMP2	Nielsen Racing	4	0	0	0	1	39	6th
2023	European Le Mans Series - LMP2 Pro/Am	Nielsen Racing	6	0	0	0	3	75	4th
2023	24 Hours of Le Mans - LMP2	Nielsen Racing	1	0	0	0	0	N/A	DNF
2023	IMSA SportsCar Championship - LMP2	Tower Motorsports	1	0	0	0	0	600	20th
2023	IMSA SportsCar Championship - LMP2	TDS Racing	1	0	0	0	0	600	20th
2024	European Le Mans Series - LMP2	Richard Mille by TDS	6	2	1	0	4	94	4th
2024	24 Hours of Le Mans - LMP2	Panis Racing	1	0	0	0	0	N/A	9th
2025	IMSA SportsCar Championship - LMP2	PR1/Mathiasen Motorsports							
2025	European Le Mans Series - LMP2	TDS Racing							

^{†} As Sales was a guest driver, he was ineligible to score points.

=== Complete European Le Mans Series results ===
(key) (Races in bold indicate pole position; results in italics indicate fastest lap)

Year	Entrant	Class	Chassis	Engine	1	2	3	4	5	6	Rank	Points
2020	JMW Motorsport	LMGTE	Ferrari 488 GTE Evo	Ferrari F154CB 3.9 L Turbo V8	LEC	SPA; 9	LEC; 7	MNZ; 6	ALG; 7		11th	26
2021	JMW Motorsport	LMGTE	Ferrari 488 GTE Evo	Ferrari F154CB 3.9 L Turbo V8	CAT; 7	RBR; 5	LEC; 6	MNZ; 4	SPA; 6	ALG; 6	8th	52
2022	Nielsen Racing	LMP2	Oreca 07	Gibson GK428 4.2 L V8	LEC; 13	IMO; 12	MNZ; 6	CAT; 7	SPA; 11	ALG; 10	16th	15
2023	Nielsen Racing	LMP2 Pro-Am	Oreca 07	Gibson GK428 4.2 L V8	CAT; 4	LEC; 4	ARA; 2	SPA; Ret	PRT; 2	ALG; 3	4th	75
2024	Richard Mille by TDS	LMP2 Pro-Am	Oreca 07	Gibson GK428 4.2 L V8	CAT; 2	LEC; 1	IMO; 3	**SPA**; Ret	MUG; 1	ALG; 5	4th	94
2025	TDS Racing	LMP2 Pro-Am	Oreca 07	Gibson GK428 4.2 L V8	CAT; 3	LEC; 3	IMO; 4	SPA; 5	SIL; 4	ALG; 1	3rd	89

^{*} Season still in progress.

=== Complete 24 Hours of Le Mans results ===
Year	Team	Co-Drivers	Car	Class	Laps	Pos.	Class Pos.
2021	(United Kingdom) JMW Motorsport	(United Kingdom) Jody Fannin (France) Thomas Neubauer	Ferrari 488 GTE Evo	GTE; Am	117	DNF	DNF
2022	(United Kingdom) Nielsen Racing	(United Kingdom) Matt Bell (United Kingdom) Ben Hanley	Oreca 07-Gibson	LMP2	362	20th	16th
2022	(United Kingdom) Nielsen Racing	(United Kingdom) Matt Bell (United Kingdom) Ben Hanley	Oreca 07-Gibson	LMP2 Pro-Am	362	20th	2nd
2023	(United Kingdom) Nielsen Racing	(Switzerland) Mathias Beche (United Kingdom) Ben Hanley	Oreca 07-Gibson	LMP2	18	DNF	DNF
2023	(United Kingdom) Nielsen Racing	(Switzerland) Mathias Beche (United Kingdom) Ben Hanley	Oreca 07-Gibson	LMP2 Pro-Am	18	DNF	DNF
2024	(France) Panis Racing	(Switzerland) Mathias Beche (United States) Scott Huffaker	Oreca 07-Gibson	LMP2	293	23rd	9th
2024	(France) Panis Racing	(Switzerland) Mathias Beche (United States) Scott Huffaker	Oreca 07-Gibson	LMP2 Pro-Am	293	23rd	4th
2025	(France) TDS Racing	(Switzerland) Mathias Beche (France) Clément Novalak	Oreca 07-Gibson	LMP2	365	22nd	5th
2025	(France) TDS Racing	(Switzerland) Mathias Beche (France) Clément Novalak	Oreca 07-Gibson	LMP2 Pro-Am	365	22nd	**2nd**
