= Élan DP04 =

Technical specifications
- Chassis: Carbon fiber composite monocoque, fiberglass body
- Suspension (front): Double wishbone, pushrod-actuated coil springs over shock absorbers, adjustable anti-roll bars
- Engine: Suzuki GSX-R1000 1.0 L (61 cu in) 16-valve DOHC I4 naturally-aspirated mid-engined
- Transmission: Hewland 6-speed sequential manual
- Power: 160 hp (120 kW)
- Weight: 835–1,050 lb (379–476 kg)
- Brakes: 4-pot aluminum calipers w/steel ventilated floating disc brakes

Competition history

The Élan DP04 is a small sports prototype race car, designed, developed, and produced by American manufacturer Élan Motorsport, in collaboration and partnership with Van Diemen, for the IMSA Prototype Challenge, between 2006 and 2012.
