= Ave-Riley AR-2 =

Le Mans Prototype race car

- Category: LMP3
- Constructor: Riley
- Designer(s): Bob Riley
- Production: 2016

Technical specifications
- Chassis: Carbon fiber monocoque
- Engine: Nissan VK50VE 5,000 cc (5.0 L; 305.1 cu in) V8 N/A, 32-valve, DOHC mid-mounted, longitudinally-mounted
- Transmission: Xtrac 6-speed sequential
- Power: 420 hp (426 PS; 313 kW)
- Weight: 800 kg (1,763.7 lb)
- Tyres: Continental; Michelin

Competition history
- Notable entrants: (United States) Ave Motorsports (United States) Riley Motorsports
- Notable drivers: (United States) Tony Ave (United States) Paul Fix
- Debut: 2017 IMSA PC Sebring
- Last event: 2020 IMSA PC Daytona
Races	Wins	Podiums	Poles	F/Laps
10	0	1	0	0
- Teams' Championships: 0
- Constructors' Championships: 0
- Drivers' Championships: 0

The Ave-Riley AR-2 is a Le Mans Prototype 3 (LMP3) racing car designed, developed and built in partnership by American constructor Riley Technologies and Ave Motorsports for competition in championships such as the European Le Mans Series, Asian Le Mans Series and IMSA Prototype Challenge.

== Racing history ==
The AR-2 made its competition debut in the 2017 IMSA Prototype Challenge round at Sebring. Paul Fix finished in 13th and 15th overall in race 1 and 2 respectively. Fix achieved modest results with a best finish of fourth in class at race 2 at Mosport. Tony Ave would get behind the wheel at final rounds at Road Atlanta and earned the AR-2 its first and only podium finish.

The car returned the following year to the Prototype Challenge series with drivers Josh Hurley and Gary Gibson. In the three races they entered in 2018, the first race at Daytona proved to be their best result, fifth place overall. After not entering in any race in 2019, the car returned in 2020 to the IMSA Prototype Challenge for one race with drivers Jim Cox and Dylan Murry. In its final race in IMSA competition, the AR-2 finished 12th.
