= 2018 IMSA Prototype Challenge =

Motorsport season

The 2018 IMSA Prototype Challenge presented by Mazda is the thirteenth season of the IMSA Lites series and its successors and the second season as the IMSA Prototype Challenge. The season features 6 races across 6 weekends.

== Series news ==
- 2018 is the final season Fox Sports will televise the series, NBC Sports Group becomes the series' broadcaster, starting in 2019.
- 2018 is also the final season that Continental Tire will be the tire supplier, Michelin will take over that role for the 2019 season.
- 2018 will be the final season of the Mazda Prototype Challenge (MPC) class, with LMP3 to become to sole class from 2019 onwards.

== Classes ==
- Le Mans Prototype 3 (LMP3)
- Mazda Prototype Challenge (MPC)

== Calendar ==
=== Race schedule ===
The 2018 schedule was released on 24 August 2017 and features six rounds.

| Rnd | Circuit | Location | Date | Duration | Supporting |
|---|---|---|---|---|---|
| 1 | Daytona International Speedway | Daytona Beach, Florida | January 6 | 1 hour 45 mins | WeatherTech SportsCar Championship |
| 2 | Sebring International Raceway | Sebring, Florida | March 16 | 1 hour 45 mins | 12 Hours of Sebring |
| 3 | Barber Motorsports Park | Birmingham, Alabama | April 22 | 1 hour 45 mins | Honda Indy Grand Prix of Alabama |
| 4 | Canadian Tire Motorsport Park | Bowmanville, Ontario | July 8 | 1 hour 45 mins | WeatherTech SportsCar Championship |
| 5 | Virginia International Raceway | Alton, Virginia | August 18 | 1 hour 45 mins | WeatherTech SportsCar Championship |
| 6 | Road Atlanta | Braselton, Georgia | October 12 | 1 hour 45 mins | Petit Le Mans |
| NC | Sebring International Raceway | Sebring, Florida | November 9 | 4 hours | IMSA Michelin Encore^{1} |

^{1} LMP3 will participate in this race with the WeatherTech SportsCar Championship's GT Daytona class and the Grand Sport and TCR cars from the Continental Tire SportsCar Challenge as one single four-hour race. This race will preview the 2019 IMSA rules package and new tyre supplier Michelin.

=== Calendar Changes ===
- The race weekend format has been changed to feature a single 1 hour 45-minute race instead of two 45 minute races as was the case in 2017.
- The rounds at Watkins Glen International, Lime Rock Park and Circuit Trois-Rivières were removed from the calendar and replaced by rounds at Daytona International Speedway and Virginia International Raceway, this reduced the number of events from seven down to six.

== Entry list ==
=== LMP3 ===
All teams use Nissan VK50VE 5.0L V8 engines.

| Team | Car | No. | Drivers | Rounds |
|---|---|---|---|---|
| Extreme Speed Motorsports | Ligier JS P3 | 3 | (United States) Max Hanratty | All |
| Extreme Speed Motorsports | Ligier JS P3 | 3 | (United States) Michael Whelden | 1 |
| Extreme Speed Motorsports | Ligier JS P3 | 3 | (Canada) Benjamin Waddell | 2–3, 5 |
| Extreme Speed Motorsports | Ligier JS P3 | 3 | (Canada) Garett Grist | 4 |
| Extreme Speed Motorsports | Ligier JS P3 | 3 | (United States) Harry Gottsacker | 6 |
| Extreme Speed Motorsports | Ligier JS P3 | 30 | (United States) Kris Wright | All |
| Extreme Speed Motorsports | Ligier JS P3 | 30 | (Canada) Daniel Morad | 1 |
| Extreme Speed Motorsports | Ligier JS P3 | 30 | (United States) Michael Whelden | 2 |
| Extreme Speed Motorsports | Ligier JS P3 | 30 | (France) Yann Clairay | 3–4 |
| Extreme Speed Motorsports | Ligier JS P3 | 30 | (South Africa) Stephen Simpson | 5 |
| Extreme Speed Motorsports | Ligier JS P3 | 30 | (Sweden) Niclas Jönsson | 6 |
| Extreme Speed Motorsports | Ligier JS P3 | 33 | (United States) Lance Willsey (M) | 1–4, 6 |
| ANSA Motorsports | Ligier JS P3 | 4 | (Canada) Roman De Angelis | 1 |
| ANSA Motorsports | Ligier JS P3 | 4 | (Canada) Dean Baker (M) | 2–6 |
| ANSA Motorsports | Ligier JS P3 | 4 | (Canada) Zacharie Robichon | 2–6 |
| Charles Wicht Racing | Ligier JS P3 | 7 | (United States) Charles Wicht (M) | 1 |
| Charles Wicht Racing | Ligier JS P3 | 7 | (Brazil) Leo Lamelas | All |
| Charles Wicht Racing | Ligier JS P3 | 7 | (Mexico) Patricio O'Ward | 2 |
| Charles Wicht Racing | Ligier JS P3 | 7 | (United States) Will Owen | 3 |
| Charles Wicht Racing | Ligier JS P3 | 7 | (Canada) Roman De Angelis | 4 |
| Charles Wicht Racing | Ligier JS P3 | 7 | (United States) Andrew Evans | 5–6 |
| Mazzoni | Ginetta-Juno P3-15 | 12 | (United States) Bill Mazzoni | 2 |
| P1 Motorsports | Ligier JS P3 | 17 | (United States) Corey Lewis | All |
| P1 Motorsports | Ligier JS P3 | 17 | (United States) Matt Dicken | All |
| P1 Motorsports | Ligier JS P3 | 25 | (United States) Kenton Koch | All |
| P1 Motorsports | Ligier JS P3 | 25 | (United States) Joel Janco (M) | All |
| P1 Motorsports | Ligier JS P3 | 42 | (United States) Jim Garrett (M) | All |
| P1 Motorsports | Ligier JS P3 | 42 | (United States) Robby Foley | All |
| Baker Racing | Ligier JS P3 | 19 | (Canada) Brad Baker (M) | 2–4 |
| Baker Racing | Ligier JS P3 | 19 | (Belgium) Jan Heylen | 2–4 |
| Gilbert LMP3 Racing | Ligier JS P3 | 23 | (United States) Henry Gilbert (M) | 1 |
| Gilbert LMP3 Racing | Ligier JS P3 | 23 | (United States) Andy Pilgrim (M) | 1 |
| Gilbert LMP3 Racing | Ligier JS P3 | 23 | (United States) Mike Skeen | 2 |
| Gilbert LMP3 Racing | Ligier JS P3 | 23 | (United States) Shane Lewis | 2 |
| K2R Motorsports | Ligier JS P3 | 26 | (United States) James McGuire Jr (M) | 2 |
| K2R Motorsports | Ligier JS P3 | 26 | (United Kingdom) Matthew Bell | 2 |
| K2R Motorsports | Ligier JS P3 | 51 | (United States) Rob Hodes (M) | All |
| K2R Motorsports | Ligier JS P3 | 51 | (United States) Sean Rayhall | 1–4 |
| K2R Motorsports | Ligier JS P3 | 51 | (Australia) Scott Andrews | 5 |
| K2R Motorsports | Ligier JS P3 | 51 | (Canada) Garett Grist | 6 |
| Polestar Motor Racing Inc. | Ligier JS P3 | 40 | (United States) Keith Grant | 3–6 |
| Polestar Motor Racing Inc. | Ligier JS P3 | 40 | (United States) David Grant | 3–6 |
| Ave Motorsports | Riley-Ave AR-2 | 44 | (United States) Josh Hurley | 1–3 |
| Ave Motorsports | Riley-Ave AR-2 | 44 | (United States) Gary Gibson (M) | 1–3 |
| Forty 7 Motorsports | Norma M30 | 47 | (United States) Austin McCusker | All |
| Forty 7 Motorsports | Norma M30 | 47 | (Switzerland) David Droux | 1 |
| Forty 7 Motorsports | Norma M30 | 47 | (United States) TJ Fischer | 2–6 |
| Forty 7 Motorsports | Norma M30 | 74 | (Canada) Anthony Simone | 2–4, 6 |
| Forty 7 Motorsports | Norma M30 | 74 | (Peru) Rodrigo Pflucker | 2–4, 6 |
| JDC Motorsports | Ligier JS P3 | 55 | (United States) Gerry Kraut (M) | 2, 6 |
| JDC Motorsports | Ligier JS P3 | 55 | (Australia) Scott Andrews | 2, 6 |
| Wulver Racing | Ligier JS P3 | 60 | (United States) Bruce Hamilton | 5–6 |
| Wulver Racing | Ligier JS P3 | 60 | (Estonia) Tõnis Kasemets | 5–6 |
| Performance Tech Motorsports | Ligier JS P3 | 75 | (Canada) Cameron Cassels (M) | All |
| Performance Tech Motorsports | Ligier JS P3 | 75 | (United States) Trent Hindman | 4 |
| Five Miles Out Racing | Norma M30 | 87 | (United States) Nicholas Colyvas (M) | 3 |
| Five Miles Out Racing | Norma M30 | 87 | (United Kingdom) Jay Howard | 3–4 |
| Five Miles Out Racing | Norma M30 | 87 | (United States) Hanna Zellers | 4–6 |
| Five Miles Out Racing | Norma M30 | 87 | (United States) Daniel Swanbeck | 5 |
| Five Miles Out Racing | Norma M30 | 87 | (United States) Nicholas Colyvas | 6 |
| Five Miles Out Racing | Norma M30 | 88 | (Canada) Charles Chi (M) | 3–6 |
| Five Miles Out Racing | Norma M30 | 88 | (United States) Memo Gidley | 3–6 |

Note: A driver with a (M) is participating in the Amateur Masters Category.

=== Mazda Prototype Challenge (MPC) ===
All teams use Elan DP02 chassis and Mazda MZR 2.0L 4 cylinder engines.

| Team | No. | Drivers | Rounds |
|---|---|---|---|
| Performance Tech Motorsports | 11 | (United States) Robert Masson | All |
| Performance Tech Motorsports | 11 | (United States) Kyle Masson | 4–6 |
| Performance Tech Motorsports | 18 | (United States) Wyatt Schwab | 1–3 |
| Performance Tech Motorsports | 18 | (United States) John DeAngelis | 6 |
| Performance Tech Motorsports | 22 | (United States) Stephen Dawes | All |
| Performance Tech Motorsports | 77 | (United States) Howard Jacobs | All |
| Performance Tech Motorsports | 77 | (United States) James French | 4–6 |
| ODU Motorsports | 21 | (United Kingdom) Stuart Rettie | 1 |
| ODU Motorsports | 46 | (United States) Jay Salmon | 1 |
| Eurosport Racing | 24 | (United States) Tim George | 1–2 |
| Eurosport Racing | 31 | (Canada) Michal Chlumecky | 1, 3–6 |
| Eurosport Racing | 34 | (United States) Jon Brownson | All |
| Wolf Motorsports | 28 | (United States) Bart Wolf | All |
| Wolf Motorsports | 28 | (United States) Tazio Ottis | All |
| ONE Motorsports | 32 | (United States) Gerhard Watzinger | 6 |
| ONE Motorsports | 36 | (United States) Paul LaHaye | All |
| ONE Motorsports | 86 | (United States) Dave House | All |
| ONE Motorsports | 86 | (United States) Mikel Miller | 1, 5–6 |

== Results ==
=== Race results ===
Bold indicates overall winner.

| Round | Circuit | LMP3 Winning Car | MPC Winning Car |
| Round | Circuit | LMP3 Winning Drivers | MPC Winning Drivers |
|---|---|---|---|
| 1 | Daytona | **No. 4 ANSA Motorsports** | No. 11 Performance Tech Motorsports |
| 1 | Daytona | **(Canada) Roman De Angelis** | (United States) Robert Masson |
| 2 | Sebring | **No. 7 CWR** | No. 86 ONE Motorsports |
| 2 | Sebring | **(Brazil) Leo Lamelas** **(Mexico) Patricio O'Ward** | (United States) Dave House |
| 3 | Barber | **No. 30 Extreme Speed Motorsports** | No. 31 Eurosport Racing |
| 3 | Barber | **(France) Yann Clairay** **(United States) Kris Wright** | (Canada) Michal Chlumecky |
| 4 | Mosport | **No. 47 Forty 7 Motorsports** | No. 77 Performance Tech Motorsports |
| 4 | Mosport | **(United States) TJ Fischer** **(United States) Austin McCusker** | (United States) James French (United States) Howard Jacobs |
| 5 | Virginia | **No. 30 Extreme Speed Motorsports** | No. 77 Performance Tech Motorsports |
| 5 | Virginia | **(South Africa) Stephen Simpson** **(United States) Kris Wright** | (United States) James French (United States) Howard Jacobs |
| 6 | Road Atlanta | **No. 47 Forty 7 Motorsports** | No. 34 Eurosport Racing |
| 6 | Road Atlanta | **(United States) TJ Fischer** **(United States) Austin McCusker** | (United States) Jon Brownson |

=== Points system ===
| Position | 1 | 2 | 3 | 4 | 5 | 6 | 7 | 8 | 9 | 10 | 11 | 12 | 13 | 14 | 15 | 16 | 17 | 18 | 19 | 20 | 21 | 22 | 23 | 24 | 25 | 26 | 27 | 28 | 29 | 30 |
|---|---|---|---|---|---|---|---|---|---|---|---|---|---|---|---|---|---|---|---|---|---|---|---|---|---|---|---|---|---|---|
| Race | 35 | 32 | 30 | 28 | 26 | 25 | 24 | 23 | 22 | 21 | 20 | 19 | 18 | 17 | 16 | 15 | 14 | 13 | 12 | 11 | 10 | 9 | 8 | 7 | 6 | 5 | 4 | 3 | 2 | 1 |

=== Drivers' Championships ===
==== LMP3 ====
| Pos. | Driver | DAY | SEB | BAR | MOS | VIR | ATL | Points |
|---|---|---|---|---|---|---|---|---|
| 1 | (United States) Kris Wright | 3 | 3 | 1 | 2 | 1 | 2 | 194 |
| 2 | (United States) Austin McCusker | 2 | 2 | 16 | 1 | 6 | 1 | 174 |
| 3 | (United States) Max Hanratty | 4 | 8 | 4 | 3 | 5 | 4 | 163 |
| 4 | (Brazil) Leo Lamelas | 7 | 1 | 3 | 16 | 4 | 13 | 150 |
| 5 | (United States) TJ Fischer | | 2 | 16 | 1 | 6 | 1 | 142 |
| 6 | (United States) Matt Dicken (United States) Corey Lewis | 12 | 5 | 6 | 6 | 8 | 9 | 140 |
| 7 | (Canada) Cameron Cassels | 8 | 11 | 13 | 7 | 9 | 5 | 133 |
| 8 | (Canada) Rob Hodes | 11 | 16 | 7 | 5 | 3 | 16 | 130 |
| 9 | (United States) Robby Foley (United States) Jim Garrett | 9 | 6 | 9 | 8 | 13 | 12 | 129 |
| 10 | (Canada) Zacharie Robichon (Canada) Dean Baker | | 13 | 8 | 4 | 2 | 8 | 124 |
| 11 | (United States) Kenton Koch (United States) Joel Janco | 6 | 14 | 11 | 13 | 7 | 17 | 118 |
| 12 | (United States) Keith Grant (United States) David Grant | | | 5 | 10 | 11 | 3 | 97 |
| 13 | (United States) Lance Willsey | 13 | 10 | 12 | 14 | | 10 | 96 |
| 14 | (United States) Sean Rayhall | 11 | 16 | 7 | 5 | | | 85 |
| 15 | (Peru) Rodrigo Pflucker (Canada) Anthony Simone | | 17 | 2 | 15 | | 15 | 78 |
| 16 | (Canada) Benjamin Waddell | | 8 | 4 | | 5 | | 77 |
| 17 | (Canada) Charles Chi (United States) Memo Gidley | | | 10 | 12 | 14 | 11 | 77 |
| 18 | (Australia) Scott Andrews | | 12 | | | 3 | 7 | 73 |
| 19 | (France) Yann Clairay | | | 1 | 2 | | | 67 |
| 20 | (United States) Gary Gibson (United States) Josh Hurley | 5 | 7 | 17 | | | | 64 |
| 21 | (Canada) Michael Whelden | 4 | 3 | | | | | 58 |
| 22 | (United States) Hanna Zellers | | | | 9 | 12 | 14 | 58 |
| 23 | (Canada) Brad Baker (United States) Jan Heylen | | 15 | 14 | 11 | | | 53 |
| 24 | (Canada) Roman De Angelis | 1 | | | 16 | | | 50 |
| 25 | (United States) Andrew Evans | | | | | 4 | 13 | 46 |
| 26 | (United States) Bruce Hamilton (Estonia) Tõnis Kasemets | | | | | 10 | 6 | 46 |
| 27 | (Canada) Garett Grist | | | | 3 | | 16 | 45 |
| 28 | (United States) Gerry Kraut | | 12 | | | | 7 | 43 |
| 29 | (United Kingdom) Jay Howard | | | 15 | 9 | | | 38 |
| 30 | (Mexico) Patricio O'Ward | | 1 | | | | | 35 |
| 31 | (South Africa) Stephen Simpson | | | | | 1 | | 35 |
| 32 | (United States) Nicholas Colyvas | | | 15 | | | 14 | 33 |
| 33 | (Switzerland) David Droux | 2 | | | | | | 32 |
| 35 | (Canada) Daniel Morad | 3 | | | | | | 30 |
| 36 | (United States) Will Owen | | | 3 | | | | 30 |
| 37 | (United States) Matthew Bell (United States) James McGuire Jr | | 4 | | | | | 28 |
| 38 | (United States) Harry Gottsacker | | | | | | 4 | 28 |
| 39 | (United States) Charles Wicht | 7 | | | | | | 24 |
| 40 | (United States) Trent Hindman | | | | 7 | | | 24 |
| 41 | (United States) Shane Lewis (United States) Mike Skeen | | 9 | | | | | 22 |
| 42 | (United States) Henry Gilbert (United States) Andy Pilgrim | 10 | | | | | | 21 |
| 43 | (United States) Daniel Swanbeck | | | | | 12 | | 19 |
| Pos. | Driver | DAY | SEB | BAR | MOS | VIR | ATL | Points |

| Colour | Result |
|---|---|
| Gold | Winner |
| Silver | Second place |
| Bronze | Third place |
| Green | Points classification |
| Blue | Non-points classification |
| Blue | Non-classified finish (NC) |
| Purple | Retired, not classified (Ret) |
| Red | Did not qualify (DNQ) |
| Red | Did not pre-qualify (DNPQ) |
| Black | Disqualified (DSQ) |
| White | Did not start (DNS) |
| White | Withdrew (WD) |
| White | Race cancelled (C) |
| Blank | Did not practice (DNP) |
| Blank | Did not arrive (DNA) |
| Blank | Excluded (EX) |

**Bold** - Pole position
Italics - Fastest lap

==== Mazda Prototype Challenge ====
| Pos. | Driver | DAY | SEB | BAR | MOS | VIR | ATL | Points |
|---|---|---|---|---|---|---|---|---|
| 1 | (United States) Jon Brownson | 5 | 9 | 2 | 2 | 6 | 1 | 172 |
| 2 | (United States) Tazio Ottis (United States) Bart Wolf | 3 | 4 | 4 | 7 | 4 | 2 | 170 |
| 3 | (United States) Stephen Dawes | 4 | 3 | 8 | 4 | 3 | 3 | 169 |
| 4 | (United States) Howard Jacobs | 11 | 5 | 7 | 1 | 1 | 5 | 166 |
| 5 | (United States) Dave House | 6 | 1 | 5 | 6 | 2 | 10 | 164 |
| 6 | (United States) Paul LaHaye | 9 | 2 | 6 | 3 | 5 | 4 | 163 |
| 7 | (United States) Robert Masson | 1 | 8 | 3 | 8 | 8 | 9 | 156 |
| 8 | (Canada) Michal Chlumecky | 12 | | 1 | 5 | 7 | 8 | 104 |
| 9 | (United States) James French | | | | 1 | 1 | 5 | 96 |
| 10 | (United States) Mikel Miller | 6 | | | | 2 | 10 | 78 |
| 11 | (United States) Wyatt Schwab | 7 | 6 | 9 | | | | 71 |
| 12 | (United States) Kyle Masson | | | | 8 | 8 | 9 | 68 |
| 13 | (United States) Tim George | 8 | 7 | | | | | 47 |
| 14 | (United Kingdom) Stuart Rettie | 2 | | | | | | 32 |
| 15 | (United States) Gerhard Watzinger | | | | | | 6 | 25 |
| 16 | (United States) John DeAngelis | | | | | | 7 | 24 |
| 17 | (United States) Jay Salmon | 10 | | | | | | 21 |
| Pos. | Driver | DAY | SEB | BAR | MOS | VIR | ATL | Points |

=== Team's Championships ===
==== LMP3 ====
| Pos. | Team | DAY | SEB | BAR | MOS | VIR | ATL | Points |
|---|---|---|---|---|---|---|---|---|
| 1 | No. 30 Extreme Speed Motorsports | 3 | 3 | 1 | 2 | 1 | 2 | 194 |
| 2 | No. 47 Forty 7 Motorsports | 2 | 2 | 16 | 1 | 6 | 1 | 174 |
| 3 | No. 3 Extreme Speed Motorsports | 4 | 8 | 4 | 3 | 5 | 4 | 163 |
| 4 | No. 4 ANSA Motorsports | 1 | 13 | 8 | 4 | 2 | 8 | 159 |
| 5 | No. 7 CWR | 7 | 1 | 3 | 16 | 4 | 13 | 150 |
| 6 | No. 17 P1 Motorsports | 12 | 5 | 6 | 6 | 8 | 9 | 140 |
| 7 | No. 75 Performance Tech Motorsports | 8 | 11 | 13 | 7 | 9 | 5 | 133 |
| 8 | No. 51 K2R Motorsports | 9 | 16 | 7 | 5 | 3 | 16 | 130 |
| 9 | No. 42 P1 Motorsports | 9 | 6 | 9 | 8 | 13 | 12 | 129 |
| 10 | No. 25 P1 Motorsports | 6 | 14 | 11 | 13 | 7 | 17 | 118 |
| 11 | No. 40 Polestar Motor Racing Inc. | | | 5 | 10 | 11 | 3 | 97 |
| 12 | No. 33 Extreme Speed Motorsports | 13 | 10 | 12 | 14 | | 10 | 96 |
| 13 | No. 74 Forty 7 Motorsports | | 17 | 2 | 15 | | 15 | 78 |
| 14 | No. 87 Five Miles Out Racing | | | 15 | 9 | 12 | 14 | 77 |
| 15 | No. 88 Five Miles Out Racing | | | 10 | 12 | 14 | 11 | 74 |
| 16 | No. 44 Ave Motorsports | 5 | 7 | 17 | | | | 64 |
| 17 | No. 19 Baker Racing | | 15 | 14 | 11 | | | 53 |
| 18 | No. 60 Wulver Racing | | | | | 10 | 6 | 46 |
| 19 | No. 55 JDC Motorsports | | 12 | | | | 7 | 43 |
| 20 | No. 23 Gilbert LMP3 Racing | 10 | 9 | | | | | 43 |
| 21 | No. 26 K2R Motorsports | | 4 | | | | | 28 |
| Pos. | Team | DAY | SEB | BAR | MOS | VIR | ATL | Points |

==== Mazda Prototype Challenge ====
| Pos. | Team | DAY | SEB | BAR | MOS | VIR | ATL | Points |
|---|---|---|---|---|---|---|---|---|
| 1 | No. 34 Eurosport Racing | 5 | 9 | 2 | 2 | 6 | 1 | 172 |
| 2 | No. 28 Wolf Motorsports | 3 | 4 | 4 | 7 | 4 | 2 | 170 |
| 3 | No. 22 Performance Tech Motorsports | 4 | 3 | 8 | 4 | 3 | 3 | 169 |
| 4 | No. 77 Performance Tech Motorsports | 11 | 5 | 7 | 1 | 1 | 5 | 166 |
| 5 | No. 86 ONE Motorsports | 6 | 1 | 5 | 6 | 2 | 10 | 164 |
| 6 | No. 36 ONE Motorsports | 9 | 2 | 6 | 3 | 5 | 4 | 163 |
| 7 | No. 11 Performance Tech Motorsports | 1 | 8 | 3 | 8 | 8 | 9 | 156 |
| 8 | No. 31 Eurosport Racing | 12 | | 1 | 5 | 7 | 8 | 127 |
| 9 | No. 18 Performance Tech Motorsports | 7 | 6 | 9 | | | 7 | 95 |
| 10 | No. 24 Eurosport Racing | 8 | 7 | | | | | 47 |
| 11 | No. 21 ODU Motorsports | 2 | | | | | | 32 |
| 12 | No. 32 ONE Motorsports | | | | | | 6 | 25 |
| 13 | No. 46 ODU Motorsports | 10 | | | | | | 21 |
| Pos. | Team | DAY | SEB | BAR | MOS | VIR | ATL | Points |
