= Matt Bell (British racing driver) =

British racing driver (born 1989)

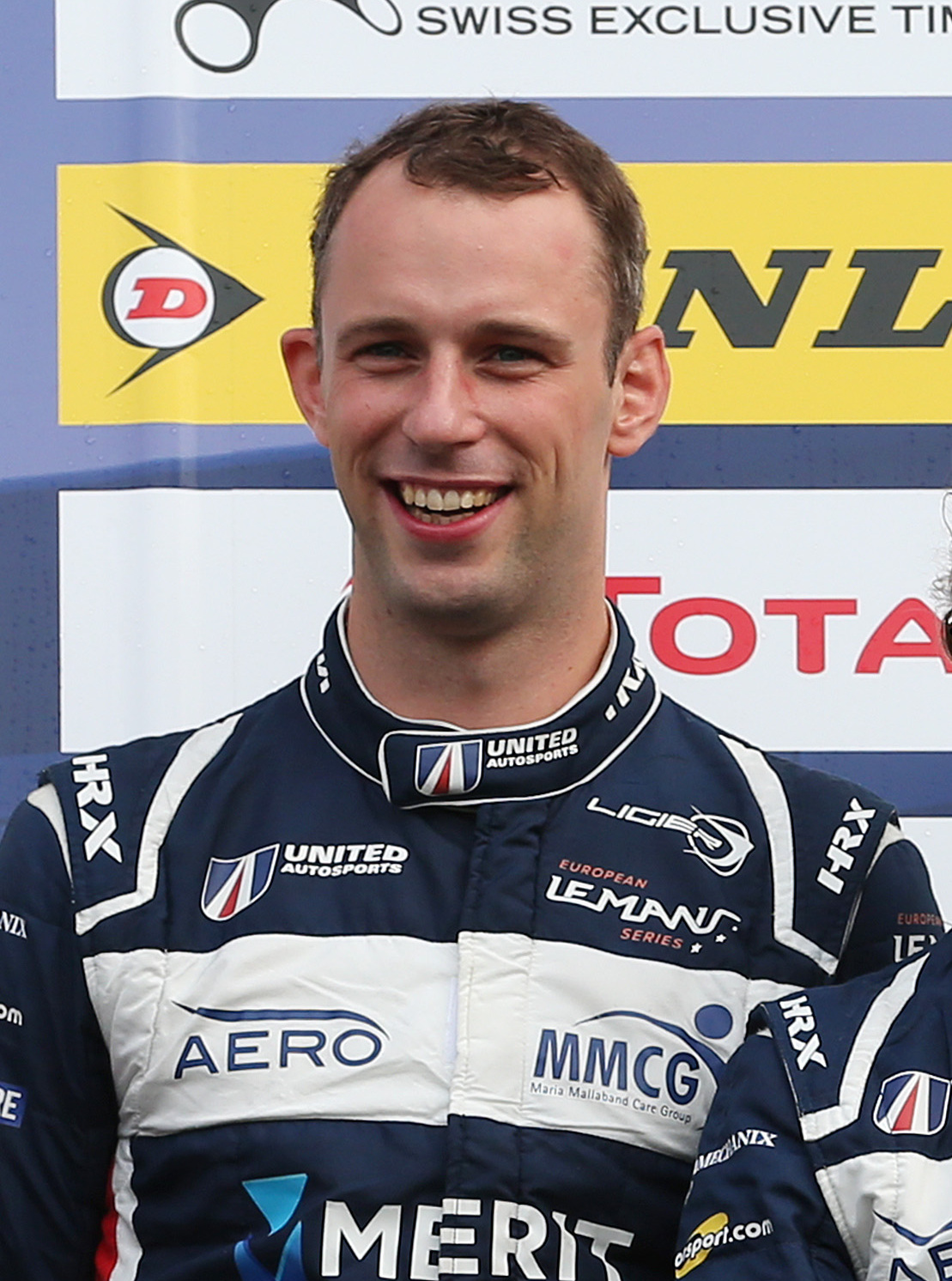
- Bell in 2018
- Nationality: (United Kingdom) British
- Born: Matthew Thomas Dagg Bell; 5 November 1989 (age 37) Peterborough, United Kingdom
- Relatives: Rob Bell (brother)
- Categorisation: FIA Silver (until 2022); FIA Gold (2023–)

Championship titles
- 2022 2020: Asian Le Mans Series – LMP2; IMSA Prototype Challenge

Matthew Thomas Dagg Bell (born 5 November 1989) is a British racing driver who competes in the GTD class of the IMSA SportsCar Championship for 13 Autosport.

A long-time sports car racer, Bell is a class winner at the 24 Hours of Daytona, an IMSA Prototype Challenge and Asian Le Mans Series champion and a race winner in the European Le Mans Series and the Le Mans Cup.

== Career ==
Bell driving at the 2022 24 Hours of Le Mans

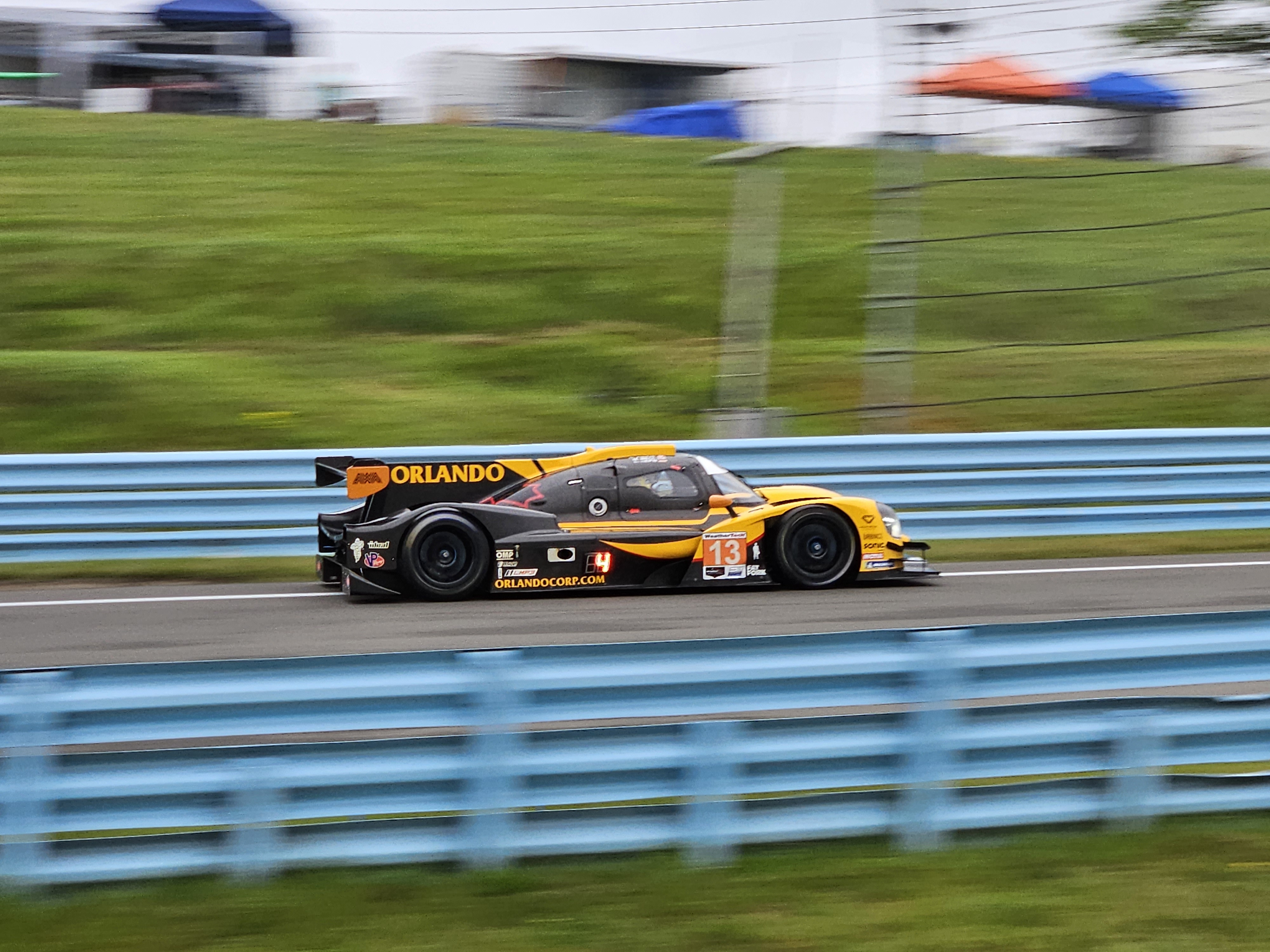
Bell driving at the 2023 Sahlen's Six Hours of The Glen

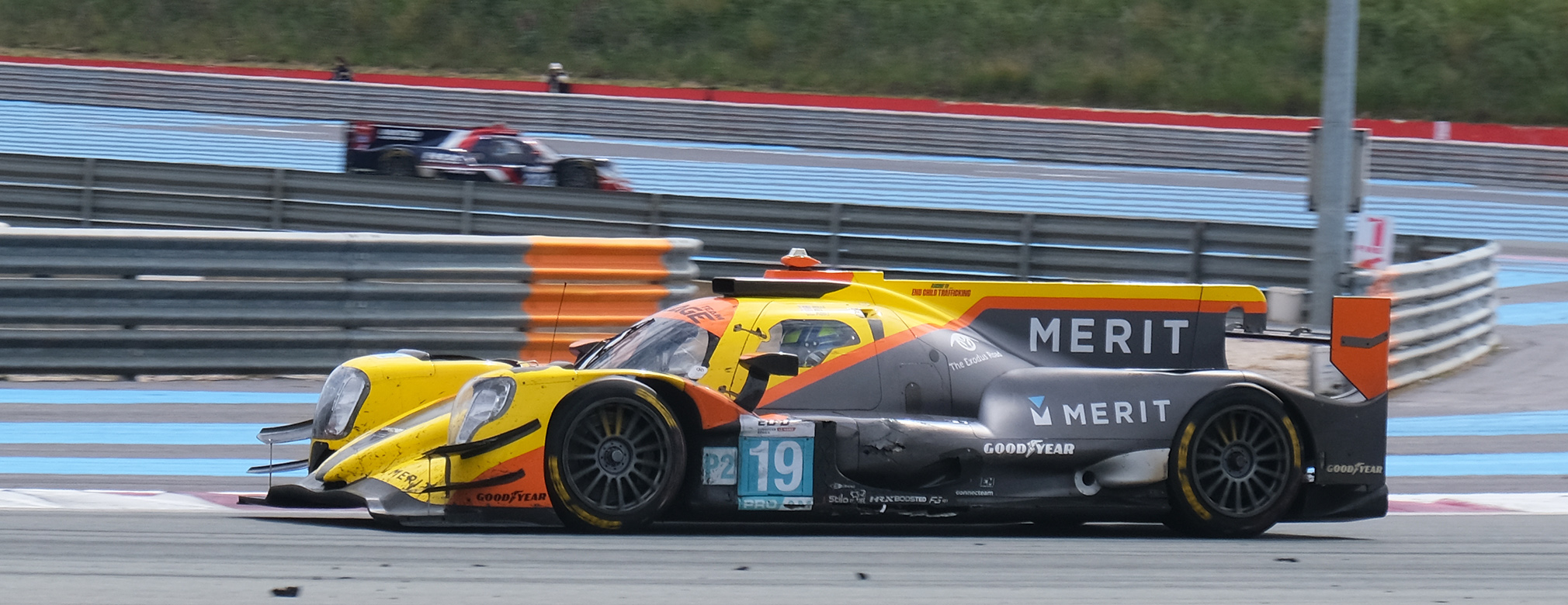
Bell driving at the 2024 4 Hours of Le Castellet

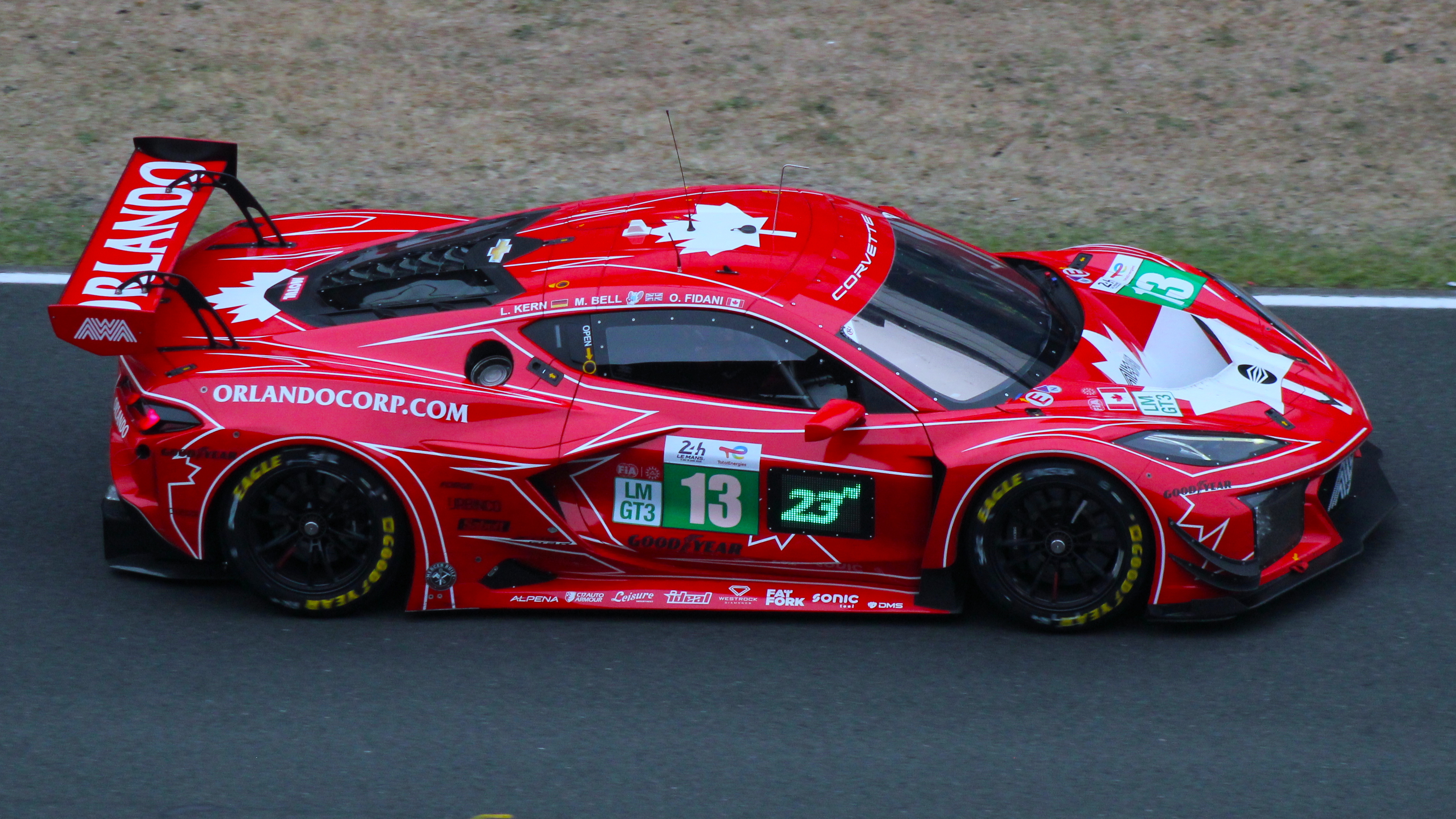
Bell raced for AWA at the 2025 24 Hours of Le Mans, finishing tenth in the LMGT3 class in his third appearance at the event.

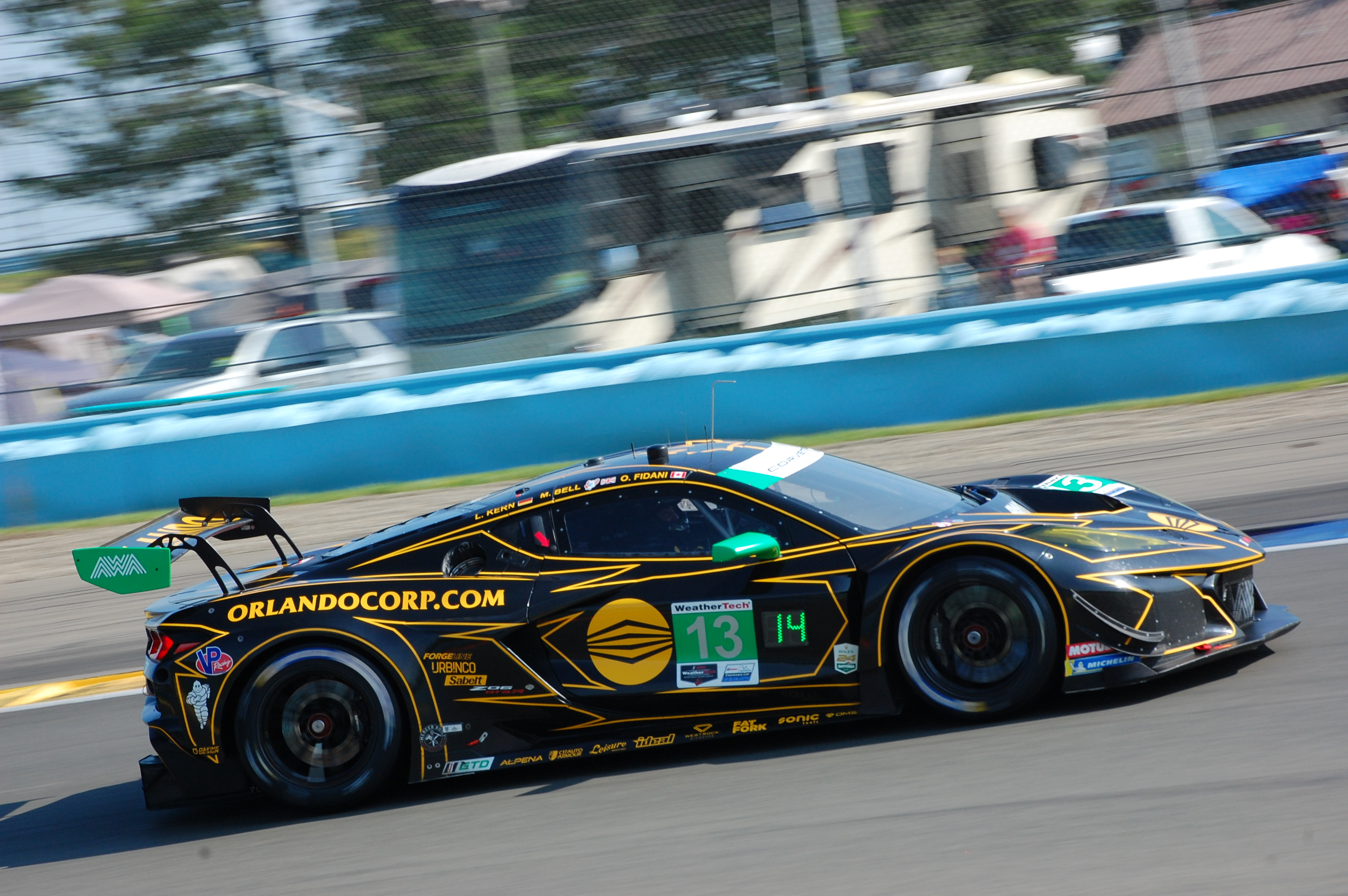
Bell driving at the 2025 Sahlen's Six Hours of The Glen

Bell began karting at 11 years old. During his time in karting, Bell won the 2004 ABkC 'O' Plate in the Junior TKM Intermediate class, before winning the 2005 Super 1 National Series and British Karting Championship in ICA.

After ending his karting career in 2006, Bell spent two years in Rugby, competing with Newcastle Falcons Academy and Blaydon RFC before a back injury forced him to retire from Rugby competition. Bell then made his car racing debut in 2009, racing in the Ginetta G20 Eurocup Trophy, finishing third in points.

Bell made his GT3 debut in 2010, joining United Autosports alongside Zak Brown to race in the FIA GT3 European Championship, driving an Audi R8. In his maiden season of GT3 competition, Bell took his maiden podium by finishing third at Algarve as he finished 24th in points. During 2010, Bell also competed in the Silverstone round in the British GT Championship alongside his brother Rob Bell. Racing a Ginetta G50 in the G4 class, the brothers won in their class. Also in 2010, Bell raced in the Formula Renault UK Winter Series with Atech GP.

Bell remained with United Autosports as he competed full-time in both the British GT Championship and the FIA GT3 European Championships as he drove an Audi R8 in both. While he was not able to replicate his success in the European championship, scoring only two points, Bell took his maiden overall win in the British championship at Snetterton on his way to sixth in points.

Staying with United Autosports in 2012, Bell mainly competed in the British GT Championship alongside Charles Bateman. Driving the first four races with the Audi R8, the duo went winless before switching to a McLaren MP4-12C for the final three rounds. In those three rounds, the pair won all but one race as they jumped to third in the GT3 standings. During 2012, Bell also made a one-off appearance in the LMGTE Am class of the FIA World Endurance Championship season finale at Shanghai for JWA-Avila.

Remaining with United Autosports for a third consecutive season in the British GT Championship, Bell drove an Audi R8 once again, this time alongside Mark Patterson. After taking three podiums in the first four rounds of the season, the duo won the season-ending race at Donington Park to finish runner-up in the standings by one point.

Bell and Patterson remained with United Autosports for 2014 as the team retained their Audi R8. In his fourth season in the series, Bell scored a lone podium at the season-ending Donington Park round by finishing third. During 2014, Bell also competed in the endurance rounds of the United SportsCar Championship for Paul Miller Racing, winning the season-ending Petit Le Mans in GTD.

At the start of 2015, Bell competed in the Bathurst 12 Hour for Bentley Team M-Sport. Despite suffering from dehydration and fatigue and being taken to the medical center mid-race, Bell led the final stages before losing the lead and falling to fourth and third in class. For the rest of the year, Bell competed in the British GT Championship for Aston Martin-linked TF Sport. In his maiden season with the team, Bell scored a lone win at the season-ending round at Donington Park to end the year fifth in points.

After finishing third overall at the Bathurst 12 Hour to start off 2016, Bell reunited with United Autosports to compete in the LMP3 class of the European Le Mans Series. Scoring three podiums all season, with a best result of second at both Silverstone and Estoril, Bell finished fifth in points in his maiden season in prototypes.

Bell remained in LMP3 competition in 2017, staying with United Autosports to race in both the Michelin Le Mans Cup and the British LMP3 Cup. Scoring just one podium in the former, a third place at Algarve, Bell ended his maiden full season in the series seventh in points. Whereas in the British LMP3 Cup, Bell took four wins and ended the year runner-up in points.

The following year, Bell remained with United Autosports to race in the LMP3 class of both the European Le Mans Series and the Michelin Le Mans Cup. While he was not able to replicate his previous year's form in the former, scoring only five points, Bell scored his maiden series win in the latter at Silverstone, en route to a third place points finish.

At the end of the year, Bell raced in the 2018–19 Asian Le Mans Series with the same team, alongside Jim McGuire and Kay van Berlo. In the four-race season, the trio won at Fuji and scored two more podiums to finish runner-up in the LMP3 standings. Bell stayed with United Autosports for the rest of 2019 as he returned to the Michelin Le Mans Cup, but endured another podium-less season as he scored 12 points across the season.

Having raced part-time with K2R Motorsports in the IMSA Prototype Challenge the year prior, Bell returned to the team and series on a full-time basis for 2020. In his only season in the series, Bell won two races and clinched the title at season's end. During 2020, Bell also raced for Cool Racing in the Michelin Le Mans Cup, with whom he won at Le Castellet, while also making his LMP2 debut in the IMSA SportsCar Championship with Performance Tech Motorsports.

In early 2021, Bell joined Nielsen Racing to compete in the LMP3 class of the Asian Le Mans Series. After scoring two podiums in the four-race winter series, Bell returned to Cool Racing to race in both the European Le Mans Series and Michelin Le Mans Cup. In the former, Bell won at Barcelona and Red Bull Ring and took two more podiums to end the season runner-up to Laurents Hörr by one point. In the latter, Bell took three podiums in the seven-race season, on his way to runner-up honours in the LMP3 standings by four points at season's end.

Bell remained with Nielsen Racing for 2022, competing with them in the LMP2 class of the Asian and European Le Mans Series, whilst also competing in LMP3 in the Michelin Le Mans Cup. In Asia, at the start of the year, Bell took two overall wins en route to the LMP2 title as he scored the maximum amount of points available. In Europe meanwhile, Bell was fourth in the LMP2 Pro-Am standings with a win at Monza in the former, and finishing a lowly 25th in points in the latter. During 2022, Bell also took part in the 2022 24 Hours of Le Mans with Nielsen Racing, in which he finished second in the LMP2 Pro-Am class on his debut.

Remaining with Nielsen Racing for 2023, Bell raced with them in the LMP3 class of the Asian Le Mans Series and Michelin Le Mans Cup, and with AWA in the IMSA SportsCar Championship. In Asia, Bell won the penultimate race of the season at Abu Dhabi to finish third in points, whereas in Le Mans Cup, Bell won race one at Le Mans and Aragón to finish fourth in the standings. In IMSA meanwhile, Bell took three podiums on his way to third in points in his first full-season in the series.

After racing in the second half of the 2023–24 Asian Le Mans Series with Nielsen Racing in the LMP2 class, Bell reunited with AWA for his second full season in the IMSA SportsCar Championship, driving in a Corvette in the GTD class. Alongside Orey Fidani for the full season and Lars Kern for the endurance races, Bell scored a best result of fifth at Road America as he ended the year tenth in GTD points. Bell also raced in the LMP2 Pro-Am class of the European Le Mans Series for Team Virage, but was left on the sidelines after three races as the team shuffled its lineup. During 2024, Bell also made his second appearance at the 24 Hours of Le Mans, racing for Cool Racing and finishing fifth in the LMP2 Pro-Am class.

Bell went back to LMP2 competition with Nielsen Racing for the 2024–25 Asian Le Mans Series, scoring a lone podium at the season-ending race at Abu Dhabi on his way to sixth in the LMP2 standings. For the rest of 2025, Bell switched back to GT3 competition by returning to AWA for his sophomore season in GTD, whilst also joining Corvette-fielding DXDT Racing in GT World Challenge America. In GTD, Bell won in class at the 24 Hours of Daytona but finished no higher than sixth in the following nine races to end the year ninth in points. In GTWC America meanwhile, Bell scored five Pro-Am wins and six more podiums to end the season runner-up in the class standings. During 2025, Bell also raced at the 24 Hours of Spa for AF Corse and the 24 Hours of Le Mans for AWA. At the end of the year, Bell joined TF Sport to race in the 2025–26 Asian Le Mans Series, taking a best result of ninth at Sepang en route to 24th in the GT standings.

For the rest of the year, Bell returned to the newly-renamed 13 Autosport for a third season in GTD, as well as returning to Nielsen Racing to compete in the LMP3 class of the Le Mans Cup. In the former, Bell achieved the newly-renamed team's maiden podium at VIR en route to fifth in the GTD standings with team owner Fidani. Towards the end of the year, Bell partook in the ELMS rookie tests for Nielsen Racing in LMP2 machinery. In 2027, Bell remained with 13 Autosport for another season in the GTD class of the IMSA SportsCar Championship.

== Karting record ==
=== Karting career summary ===
Season	Series	Team	Position
2004	Super 1 National Series – ICA Junior		4th
2004	ABkC 'O' Plate – Junior TKM Intermediate		1st
2005	South Garda Winter Cup – ICA		12th
2005	Karting European Championship – ICA	Team Simpson Int.	26th
2005	Super 1 National Series – ICA		1st
2005	British Karting Championship – ICA		1st
2006	Super 1 Series – Formula A		25th

== Racing record ==
=== Racing career summary ===
Season	Series	Team	Races	Wins	Poles	F/Laps	Podiums	Points	Position
2009	Ginetta G20 Eurocup Trophy	Reflex Racing GB	3	0	0	0	1	??	**3rd**
2009	Texaco Havoline Ginetta Championship	Reflex Racing GB	8	0	0	0	2	146	12th
2010	Formula Renault UK Winter Series	Atech GP	6	0	0	0	0	51	13th
2010	FIA GT3 European Championship	United Autosports	11	0	0	0	1	39	24th
2010	Ginetta G50 Cup	United Autosports	5	0	0	0	1	64	20th
2010	British GT Championship – G4	United Autosports	2	2	0	0	2	20	12th
2011	FIA GT3 European Championship	United Autosports	12	0	0	0	0	2	37th
2011	British GT Championship – GT3	United Autosports	10	1	0	0	3	110.5	6th
2011	Blancpain Endurance Series – Pro-Am	United Autosports	1	0	0	0	0	0	NC
2012	Gulf 12 Hours – CN2	If Motorsport 1	1	0	0	0	0	—N/a	NC
2012	Dubai 24 Hour – A6	United Autosports	1	0	0	0	0	—N/a	18th
2012	British GT Championship – GT3	United Autosports	10	3	0	0	3	121	**3rd**
2012	Blancpain Endurance Series	United Autosports	3	0	0	0	0	6	23rd
2012	FIA World Endurance Championship – LMGTE Am	JWA-Avila	1	0	0	0	0	0.5	91st
2013	British GT Championship – GT3	United Autosports	10	1	0	1	4	124	**2nd**
2013	Blancpain Endurance Series – Pro-Am	JRM Racing	4	0	0	0	0	13	26th
2013	ADAC GT Masters	JRM Racing	2	0	0	0	0	0	NC
2014	United SportsCar Championship – GTD	Paul Miller Racing	3	1	0	0	1	104	28th
2014	British GT Championship – GT3	United Autosports	10	0	0	0	1	58.5	8th
2014–15	NGK Racing Series – Class 4 GTB	Dragon Racing	2	0	0	0	1	0	NC
2015	Bathurst 12 Hour – AP	Bentley Team M-Sport	1	0	0	0	1	—N/a	**3rd**
2015	British GT Championship – GT3	TF Sport	8	1	0	0	3	107	5th
2016	Bathurst 12 Hour	Bentley Team M-Sport	1	0	0	0	1	—N/a	**3rd**
2016	Intercontinental GT Challenge	Bentley Team M-Sport	1	0	0	0	1	18	9th
2016	European Le Mans Series – LMP3	United Autosports	6	0	1	0	4	59	5th
2016	GT3 Le Mans Cup	FFF Racing by ACM	1	0	0	0	0	0.5	23rd
2016–17	Asian Le Mans Series – GT	FFF Racing by ACM	3	0	0	0	0	6.5	16th
2017	British LMP3 Cup	United Autosports	12	4	0	1	9	212	**2nd**
2017	Le Mans Cup – LMP3	United Autosports	7	0	0	0	1	32	7th
2018	IMSA Prototype Challenge	K2R Motorsports	1	0	0	0	0	28	37th
2018	IMSA Michelin Encore – LMP3	K2R Motorsports	1	0	0	0	1	—N/a	**2nd**
2018	European Le Mans Series – LMP3	United Autosports	6	1	0	0	2	58.5	**3rd**
2018	Le Mans Cup – LMP3	United Autosports	7	0	0	0	0	5	26th
2018	24H Series – GT4	Brookspeed International Motorsport	1	0	0	0	0	0	NC
2018–19	Asian Le Mans Series – LMP3	United Autosports	4	1	0	0	1	53	4th
2019	IMSA Prototype Challenge	K2R Motorsports	4	0	0	1	2	83	24th
2019	Le Mans Cup – LMP3	United Autosports	7	0	0	1	0	12	21st
2019	Ultimate Cup Series Endurance – LMP3	Cool Racing	1	0	0	1	0	24	27th
2020	IMSA Prototype Challenge	K2R Motorsports	6	2	2	1	5	190	**1st**
2020	Le Mans Cup – LMP3	Cool Racing	6	1	0	1	3	49	7th
2020	IMSA SportsCar Championship – LMP2	Performance Tech Motorsports	1	0	0	1	1	60	10th
2020	IMSA SportsCar Championship – LMP2	Inter Europol Competition	1	0	0	0	1	60	10th
2021	Asian Le Mans Series – LMP3	Nielsen Racing	4	0	0	0	2	39	5th
2021	IMSA SportsCar Championship – LMP2	WIN Autosport	1	0	0	0	0	0	NC
2021	IMSA SportsCar Championship – LMP3	WIN Autosport	2	0	0	0	0	504	18th
2021	IMSA Prototype Challenge – LMP3-1	WIN Autosport	2	0	0	0	0	520	20th
2021	European Le Mans Series – LMP3	Cool Racing	6	2	0	0	4	104	**2nd**
2021	Le Mans Cup – LMP3	Cool Racing	6	0	0	1	4	71	**2nd**
2022	Asian Le Mans Series – LMP2	Nielsen Racing	4	4	2	1	4	104	**1st**
2022	European Le Mans Series – LMP2 Pro-Am	Nielsen Racing	6	1	0	0	4	97	4th
2022	Le Mans Cup – LMP3	Nielsen Racing	7	0	0	0	0	7	25th
2022	Prototype Cup Germany	Nielsen Racing	2	0	0	0	0	0	NC
2022	24 Hours of Le Mans – LMP2 Pro-Am	Nielsen Racing	1	0	0	0	1	—N/a	**2nd**
2022	IMSA SportsCar Championship – LMP3	AWA	3	0	0	0	1	1115	13th
2022	IMSA SportsCar Championship – LMP3	Forty7 Motorsports	2	0	0	0	0	1115	13th
2023	Asian Le Mans Series – LMP3	Nielsen Racing	4	1	0	0	1	45	**3rd**
2023	Le Mans Cup – LMP3	Nielsen Racing	7	2	0	2	2	45	4th
2023	Endurance Prototype Challenge – LMP3	Nielsen Racing	1	0	0	1	1	15	21st
2023	IMSA SportsCar Championship – LMP3	AWA	7	0	0	0	3	1882	**3rd**
2023	GT World Challenge Europe Endurance Cup – Pro-Am	Haupt Racing Team	1	0	0	0	0	0	NC
2023	GT World Challenge America – Pro-Am	TR3 Racing	1	0	0	0	1	0	NC
2023–24	Asian Le Mans Series – LMP2	Nielsen Racing	3	0	0	0	0	6	16th
2024	Gulf 12 Hours	Dragon Racing	1	0	0	0	0	—N/a	10th
2024	IMSA SportsCar Championship – GTD	AWA	10	0	0	1	0	2288	10th
2024	European Le Mans Series – LMP2 Pro-Am	Team Virage	3	0	0	0	0	18	13th
2024	GT World Challenge Europe Endurance Cup – Bronze	Kessel Racing	2	0	0	0	0	10	28th
2024	24 Hours of Le Mans – LMP2 Pro-Am	Cool Racing	1	0	0	0	0	—N/a	5th
2024–25	Asian Le Mans Series – LMP2	Nielsen Racing	6	0	0	0	1	62	6th
2025	Middle East Trophy – GT3	Dragon Racing	1	0	0	0	0	0	NC
2025	IMSA SportsCar Championship – GTD	AWA	10	1	0	1	1	2461	9th
2025	24 Hours of Le Mans – LMGT3	AWA	1	0	0	0	0	—N/a	10th
2025	GT World Challenge America – Pro-Am	DXDT Racing	13	4	1	2	10	195	**2nd**
2025	24H Series – GT3 Pro-Am	Kessel Racing	1	0	0	0	1	32	NC
2025	Intercontinental GT Challenge	AF Corse	1	0	0	0	0	0	NC
2025–26	Asian Le Mans Series – GT	TF Sport	6	0	0	0	0	4	24th
2026	IMSA SportsCar Championship – GTD	13 Autosport	10	0	0	1	1	2414	5th
2026	24 Hours of Le Mans – LMGT3	13 Autosport	1	0	0	0	0	—N/a	DNF
2026	Le Mans Cup – LMP3	Nielsen Racing	1	0	0	0	0	0	37th
2027	IMSA SportsCar Championship – GTD	13 Autosport						*	*

=== Complete FIA GT3 European Championship results ===
(key) (Races in bold indicate pole position; races in italics indicate fastest lap)

Year	Entrant	Chassis	Engine	1	2	3	4	5	6	7	8	9	10	11	12	Pos.	Points
2010	United Autosports	Audi R8 LMS	Audi 5.2 L V10	SIL; 1; 16	SIL; 2; 15	BRN; 1; 25	BRN; 2; 21	JAR; 1; 13	JAR; 2 DNS	LEC; 1; 13	LEC; 2; 23	ALG; 1; 21	ALG; 2; 3	ZOL; 1; 17	ZOL; 2; 8	24th	19
2011	United Autosports	Audi R8 LMS	Audi 5.2 L V10	ALG; 1; 10	ALG; 2; 10	SIL; 1; 21	SIL; 2; 16	NAV; 1; 19	NAV; 2; 20	LEC; 1 Ret	LEC; 2; 11	SLO; 1; 12	SLO; 2 Ret	ZAN; 1; 20	ZAN; 2; 20	37th	2

=== Complete British GT Championship results ===
(key) (Races in bold indicate pole position) (Races in italics indicate fastest lap)

Year	Team	Car	Class	1	2	3	4	5	6	7	8	9	10	11	12	13	DC	Points
2010	United Autosports	Ginetta G50	G4	OUL; 1	OUL; 2	KNO; 1	KNO; 2	SPA	ROC; 1	ROC; 2	SIL; 15	SNE; 1	SNE; 2	BRH; 1	BRH; 2	DON	12th	20
2011	United Autosports	Audi R8 LMS	GT3	OUL; 1; 2	OUL; 2; 3	SNE; 1	BRH; Ret	SPA; 1; 6	SPA; 2; 5	ROC; 1; 10	ROC; 2; 5	DON; 7	SIL; 22				6th	110.5
2012	United Autosports	Audi R8 LMS Ultra	GT3	OUL; 1; 15†	OUL; 2; 5	NUR; 1; 13†	NUR; 2; 6	ROC; 1; 9	BRH; 1; 11								3rd	121
2012	United Autosports	McLaren MP4-12C GT3	GT3							SNE; 1; 1	SNE; 2 Ret	SIL; 1	DON; 3				3rd	121
2013	United Autosports	Audi R8 LMS Ultra	GT3	OUL; 1; 9	OUL; 2; 2	ROC; 3	SIL; 17	SNE; 1; 5	SNE; 2; 3	BRH; 6	ZAN; 1; 7	ZAN; 2; 10	DON; 1				2nd	124
2014	United Autosports	Audi R8 LMS Ultra	GT3	OUL; 1; 4	OUL; 2 Ret	ROC; Ret	SIL; Ret	SNE; 1; 7	SNE; 2; 6	SPA; 1; 5	SPA; 2; 22	BRH; 17	DON; 3				8th	58.5
2015	TF Sport	Aston Martin V12 Vantage GT3	GT3	OUL; 1 Ret	OUL; 2 DNS	ROC; 5	SIL; Ret	SPA; 7	BRH; 3	SNE; 1; 3	SNE; 2; 6	DON; 1					5th	107

^{†} Bell did not finish, but was classified as he completed 90% race distance.

=== Complete GT World Challenge Europe results ===
==== GT World Challenge Europe Endurance Cup ====
(key) (Races in bold indicate pole position) (Races in italics indicate fastest lap)

Year	Team	Car	Class	1	2	3	4	5	6	7	8	Pos.	Points
2011	United Autosports	Audi R8 LMS	Pro-Am	MNZ	NAV	SPA; 6H ?	SPA; 12H ?	SPA; 24H; Ret	MAG	SIL		NC	0
2012	United Autosports	McLaren MP4-12C GT3	Pro	MNZ; Ret	SIL; 23	LEC; 27	SPA; 6H	SPA; 12H	SPA; 24H	NÜR	NAV	23rd	6
2013	JRM Racing	Nissan GT-R Nismo GT3	Pro-Am	MNZ; 31	SIL; 19	LEC; 25	SPA; 6H ?	SPA; 12H ?	SPA; 24H; Ret	NÜR		26th	13
2023	Haupt Racing Team	Mercedes-AMG GT3 Evo	Pro-Am	MNZ	LEC	SPA; 6H; 50	SPA; 12H; 47	SPA; 24H; Ret	NÜR	CAT		18th	11
2024	Kessel Racing	Ferrari 296 GT3	Bronze	LEC; 26	SPA; 6H; 54	SPA; 12H; 49	SPA; 24H; 45†	NÜR	MNZ	JED		28th	10
2025	AF Corse	Ferrari 296 GT3	Pro-Am	LEC	MNZ	SPA; 6H; 72†	SPA; 12H; 72†	SPA; 24H; Ret	NÜR	CAT		NC	0

=== Complete FIA World Endurance Championship results ===
(key) (Races in bold indicate pole position; races in italics indicate fastest lap)

Year	Entrant	Class	Chassis	Engine	1	2	3	4	5	6	7	8	Rank	Points
2012	JWA-Avila	LMGTE Am	Porsche 997 GT3-RSR	Porsche 4.0L Flat-6	SEB	SPA	LMS	SIL	SÃO	BHR	FUJ	SHA; 6	91st	0.5

=== Complete 24 Hours of Daytona results ===
Year	Team	Co-Drivers	Car	Class	Laps	Pos.	Class Pos.
2014	(United States) Paul Miller Racing	(Germany) Christopher Haase (United States) Bryce Miller (Germany) René Rast	Audi R8 LMS ultra	GTD	626	36th	14th
2021	(United States) WIN Autosport	(United States) Thomas Merrill (United States) Tristan Nunez (United States) Steven Thomas	Oreca 07	LMP2	764	16th	5th
2022	(Canada) AWA	(Canada) Orey Fidani (Germany) Lars Kern (Canada) Kuno Wittmer	Duqueine M30 - D-08	LMP3	695	32nd	5th
2023	(Canada) AWA	(Canada) Orey Fidani (Germany) Lars Kern (Germany) Moritz Kranz	Duqueine M30 - D-08	LMP3	717	35th	4th
2024	(Canada) AWA	(Canada) Orey Fidani (Germany) Lars Kern (United Kingdom) Alex Lynn	Chevrolet Corvette Z06 GT3.R	GTD	308	DNF	DNF
2025	(Canada) AWA	(Canada) Orey Fidani (Germany) Lars Kern (Germany) Marvin Kirchhöfer	Chevrolet Corvette Z06 GT3.R	GTD	719	21st	**1st**

=== Complete IMSA SportsCar Championship results ===
(key) (Races in bold indicate pole position) (Races in italics indicate fastest lap)

Year	Entrant	Class	Chassis	Engine	1	2	3	4	5	6	7	8	9	10	11	Pos.	Pts
2014	Paul Miller Racing	GTD	Audi R8 LMS ultra	Audi 5.2 L V10 V10	DAY; 14	SEB; 12	LGA	DET	WGL	MOS	IMS	ELK	VIR	COA	PET; 1	30th	83
2020	Performance Tech Motorsports	LMP2	Oreca 07	Gibson GK428 4.2 L V8	DAY	SEB	ELK	ATL	ATL; 2							10th	60
2020	Inter Europol Competition	LMP2	Oreca 07	Gibson GK428 4.2 L V8						LGA	SEB; 4					10th	60
2021	WIN Autosport	LMP2	Oreca 07	Gibson GK428 4.2 L V8	DAY; 5†											0	NC
2021	WIN Autosport	LMP3	Duqueine M30 - D08	Nissan VK56 V8 5.6L V8		SEB; 6	MDO	WGL	WGL	ELK	PET; 8					504	18th
2022	AWA	LMP3	Duqueine M30 - D-08	Nissan VK56 V8 5.6L V8	DAY; 5					ELK; 2	ATL; 7					6th	1716
2022	Forty7 Motorsports	LMP3	Duqueine M30 - D-08	Nissan VK56 V8 5.6L V8		SEB; 8	MOH	WGL; 8	MOS							6th	1716
2023	AWA	LMP3	Duqueine M30 - D-08	Nissan VK56 V8 5.6L V8	DAY; 4	SEB; 2	WGL; 5	MOS; 4	ELK; 3	IMS; 5	ATL; 2					3rd	1882
2024	AWA	GTD	Chevrolet Corvette Z06 GT3.R	Chevrolet LT6 5.5 L V8	DAY; 21	SEB; 9	LBH; 6	LGA; 11	WGL; 7	MOS; 13	ELK; 5	VIR; 6	IMS; 6	ATL; 11		10th	2288
2025	AWA	GTD	Chevrolet Corvette Z06 GT3.R	Chevrolet LT6 5.5 L V8	DAY; 1	SEB; 10	LBH; 13	LGA; 13	WGL; 9	MOS; 9	ELK; 7	VIR; 8	IMS; 6	ATL; 9		9th	2461
2026	13 Autosport	GTD	Chevrolet Corvette Z06 GT3.R	Chevrolet LT6 5.5 L V8	DAY; 4	SEB; 6	LBH; 12	LGA; 12	WGL; 13	MOS; 12	ELK; 7	VIR; 6	IMS; 3	PET; 10		5th	2414

* Season still in progress.

^{†} Points only counted towards the Michelin Endurance Cup, and not the overall LMP2 Championship.

=== Complete European Le Mans Series results ===
(key) (Races in bold indicate pole position; results in italics indicate fastest lap)

Year	Entrant	Class	Chassis	Engine	1	2	3	4	5	6	Rank	Points
2016	United Autosports	LMP3	Ligier JS P3	Nissan VK50VE 5.0 L V8	SIL; 2	**IMO**; 7	RBR; 14	LEC; 11	SPA; 3	EST; 2	5th	59
2018	United Autosports	LMP3	Ligier JS P3	Nissan VK50VE 5.0 L V8	LEC; 7	MNZ; 3	RBR; 12	SIL; 1	SPA; 4	ALG; 7	3rd	58.5
2021	Cool Racing	LMP3	Ligier JS P320	Nissan VK56DE 5.6L V8	CAT; 1	RBR; 1	LEC; 2	MNZ; 4	SPA; 2	ALG; 8	2nd	104
2022	Nielsen Racing	LMP2 Pro-Am	Oreca 07	Gibson GK428 4.2 L V8	LEC; 4	IMO; 3	MNZ; 1	CAT; 2	SPA; 4	ALG; 3	4th	97
2024	Team Virage	LMP2 Pro-Am	Oreca 07	Gibson GK428 4.2 L V8	CAT; NC	LEC; 7	IMO; 4	SPA	MUG	ALG	13th	18

=== Complete Le Mans Cup results ===
(key) (Races in bold indicate pole position; results in italics indicate fastest lap)

Year	Entrant	Class	Chassis	1	2	3	4	5	6	7	Rank	Points
2016	FFF Racing Team by ACM	GT3	Lamborghini Huracán GT3	IMO	LMS; 11	RBR	LEC	SPA	EST		23rd	0.5
2017	United Autosports	LMP3	Ligier JS P3	MNZ; 10	LMS; 1; 7	LMS; 2; 16	RBR; 8	LEC; 13	SPA; 6	POR; 3	7th	32
2018	United Autosports	LMP3	Ligier JS P3	LEC; 11	MNZ; 16	LMS; 1; 36	LMS; 2; 22	RBR; 9	SPA; 13	ALG; 12	26th	5
2019	United Autosports	LMP3	Ligier JS P3	LEC; 10	MNZ; 8	LMS; 1; 19	LMS; 2; 6	CAT; Ret	SPA; 11	ALG; 10	21st	12
2020	Cool Racing	LMP3	Ligier JS P320	LEC1; 5	SPA; 7	LEC2; 1	LMS; 1; 3	LMS; 2; 3	MNZ; 8	ALG; Ret	4th	59
2021	Cool Racing	LMP3	Ligier JS P320	BAR; 3	LEC; 2	MNZ; 12	LMS; 1; 3	LMS; 2; 14	SPA; 2	POR; 4	2nd	71
2022	Nielsen Racing	LMP3	Duqueine M30 - D-08	LEC; 8	IMO; Ret	LMS; 1 Ret	LMS; 2; 8	MNZ; 22	SPA; 27	ALG; 15	25th	7
2023	Nielsen Racing	LMP3	Duqueine M30 - D-08	CAT; Ret	LMS; 1; 1	LMS; 2; 7	LEC; 11	ARA; 1	SPA; Ret	ALG; Ret	4th	45
2026	Nielsen Racing	LMP3	Duqueine D09	CAT; 13	LEC	LMS	SPA	SIL	ALG		37th	0

=== Complete Asian Le Mans Series results ===
(key) (Races in bold indicate pole position) (Races in italics indicate fastest lap)

Year	Team	Class	Car	Engine	1	2	3	4	5	6	Pos.	Points
2016–17	FFF Racing by ACM	GT	Lamborghini Huracán GT3	Lamborghini 5.2 L V10	ZHU; Ret	FUJ; 11	CHA; 7	SEP			16th	6.5
2018–19	United Autosports	LMP3	Ligier JS P3	Nissan VK50 5.0 L V8	SHA; 6	FUJ; 1	CHA; 5	SEP; 5			4th	53
2021	Nielsen Racing	LMP3	Ligier JS P320	Nissan VK50 5.0 L V8	DUB; 1 Ret	DUB; 2; 3	ABU; 1; 2	ABU; 2; 7			5th	39
2022	Nielsen Racing	LMP2	Oreca 07	Gibson GK428 4.2 L V8	**DUB**; **1**; 1	**DUB**; **2**; 1	ABU; 1; 2	ABU; 2; 2			1st	104
2023	Nielsen Racing	LMP3	Ligier JS P320	Nissan VK56DE 5.6L V8	DUB; 1; 13	DUB; 2; 6	ABU; 1; 1	ABU; 2; 4			3rd	45
2023–24	Nielsen Racing	LMP2	Oreca 07	Gibson GK428 4.2 L V8	SEP; 1	SEP; 2	DUB; 1 Ret	ABU; 1; 8	ABU; 2; 9		16th	6
2024–25	Nielsen Racing	LMP2	Oreca 07	Gibson GK428 4.2 L V8	SEP; 1; 5	SEP; 2; 5	DUB; 1; 7	DUB; 2; 7	ABU; 1; 4	ABU; 2; 2	6th	62
2025–26	TF Sport	GT	Chevrolet Corvette Z06 GT3.R	Chevrolet LT6.R 5.5 L V8	SEP; 1; 15	SEP; 2; 9	DUB; 1 Ret	DUB; 2; 13	ABU; 1; 10	ABU; 2; 13	24th	4

=== Complete Prototype Cup Germany results ===
(key) (Races in bold indicate pole position) (Races in italics indicate fastest lap)

Year	Team	Car	Engine	1	2	3	4	5	6	7	8	DC	Points
2022	Nielsen Racing	Duqueine M30 - D08	Nissan VK56DE 5.6L V8	SPA; 1 Ret	SPA; 2; 9	NÜR; 1	NÜR; 2	LAU; 1	LAU; 2	HOC; 1	HOC; 2	NC†	0

† As Bell was a guest driver, he was ineligible to score points.

=== Complete 24 Hours of Le Mans results ===
Year	Team	Co-Drivers	Car	Class	Laps	Pos.	Class Pos.
2022	(United Kingdom) Nielsen Racing	(United Kingdom) Ben Hanley (United States) Rodrigo Sales	Oreca 07-Gibson	LMP2	362	20th	16th
2022	(United Kingdom) Nielsen Racing	(United Kingdom) Ben Hanley (United States) Rodrigo Sales	Oreca 07-Gibson	LMP2 Pro-Am	362	20th	**2nd**
2024	(Switzerland) Cool Racing	(United States) Naveen Rao (Denmark) Frederik Vesti	Oreca 07-Gibson	LMP2	291	24th	10th
2024	(Switzerland) Cool Racing	(United States) Naveen Rao (Denmark) Frederik Vesti	Oreca 07-Gibson	LMP2 Pro-Am	291	24th	5th
2025	(Canada) AWA Racing	(Canada) Orey Fidani (Germany) Lars Kern	Chevrolet Corvette Z06 GT3.R	LMGT3	338	42nd	10th
2026	(Canada) 13 Autosport	(Canada) Orey Fidani (Germany) Lars Kern	Chevrolet Corvette Z06 GT3.R	LMGT3	61	DNF	DNF
