= 2020 IMSA Prototype Challenge =

The 2020 IMSA Prototype Challenge is the fifteenth season of the IMSA Lites series and its successors and the fourth season as the IMSA Prototype Challenge. The opening race of the season was on January 4 at the Daytona International Speedway and the season concludes on October 9 at Road Atlanta. The championship will be contested solely by LMP3 class prototypes.

== Calendar ==
=== Race schedule ===
The 2020 schedule was released August 2, 2019.
A revised calendar was released May 15, 2020, due to changes made because of the COVID-19 pandemic.

Rnd	Circuit	Location	Date	Duration
1	Daytona International Speedway	Daytona Beach, Florida	January 4	3 hours
2	Sebring International Raceway	Sebring, Florida	July 17	1 hour 45 mins
3	Road America	Elkhart Lake, Wisconsin	August 1	1 hour 45 mins
4	Virginia International Raceway	Alton, Virginia	August 22	1 hour 45 mins
5	Mid-Ohio Sports Car Course	Lexington, Ohio	September 27	1 hour 45 mins
6	Michelin Raceway Road Atlanta	Braselton, Georgia	October 16	3 hours

=== Calendar changes ===
- The round at Virginia International Raceway was replaced by a round at Road America.
- Due to COVID-19 restrictions, the round at Mosport was replaced with a round at VIR.

== Entry list ==
All cars use the Nissan VK50VE 5.0L V8 engine.

Team	Car	No.	Drivers	Rounds
(United States) Jr III Racing	Ligier JS P3	3	(United States) Eric Palmer	All
(United States) Jr III Racing	Ligier JS P3	3	(United States) Greg Palmer	All
(United States) Performance Tech Motorsports	Ligier JS P3	6	(United States) Dan Goldburg	1–3, 5–6
(United States) Performance Tech Motorsports	Ligier JS P3	6	(United States) Blake Mount	1, 4
(United States) Performance Tech Motorsports	Ligier JS P3	6	(Sweden) Rasmus Lindh	2–3, 5–6
(United States) Performance Tech Motorsports	Ligier JS P3	6	(United States) Jon Branam	4
(United States) Performance Tech Motorsports	Ligier JS P3	19	(United States) Dan Goldburg	4
(United States) Performance Tech Motorsports	Ligier JS P3	19	(Sweden) Rasmus Lindh	4
(United States) Performance Tech Motorsports	Ligier JS P3	75	(Canada) Cameron Cassels	All
(United States) Performance Tech Motorsports	Ligier JS P3	75	(United States) Max Hanratty	1–5
(United States) Performance Tech Motorsports	Ligier JS P3	75	(South Africa) Stephen Simpson	6
(United States) JDC MotorSports	Norma M30	9	(Australia) Scott Andrews	2–6
(United States) JDC MotorSports	Norma M30	9	(United States) Gerry Kraut	2–6
(United States) Robillard Racing LLC	Norma M30	10	(United Kingdom) Stevan McAleer	All
(United States) Robillard Racing LLC	Norma M30	10	(United States) Joe Robillard	All
(United States) K2R Motorsports (United States) MG1 Motorsports LLC	Ligier JS P3	11	(United States) Steven Thomas	All
(United States) K2R Motorsports (United States) MG1 Motorsports LLC	Ligier JS P3	11	(United States) Thomas Merrill	1, 6
(United States) K2R Motorsports (United States) MG1 Motorsports LLC	Ligier JS P3	64	(United Kingdom) Matthew Bell	All
(United States) K2R Motorsports (United States) MG1 Motorsports LLC	Ligier JS P3	64	(United States) Naveen Rao	All
(United Kingdom) Nielsen Racing	Norma M30	17	(Canada) Garett Grist	1
(United Kingdom) Nielsen Racing	Norma M30	17	(United States) Rob Hodes	1
(United States) Gilbert/Korthoff Racing	Norma M30	23	(United States) Jon Brownson	1–2
(United States) Gilbert/Korthoff Racing	Norma M30	23	(Canada) Anthony Simone	1–2
(United States) Sean Creech Motorsport	Ligier JS P3	30	(United Kingdom) Wayne Boyd	1
(United States) Sean Creech Motorsport	Ligier JS P3	30	(United States) Naj Husain	1
(United States) Sean Creech Motorsport	Ligier JS P3	33	(United States) Lance Willsey	1–2, 4–6
(United States) Sean Creech Motorsport	Ligier JS P3	33	(United States) Anthony Lazzaro	1
(United States) Sean Creech Motorsport	Ligier JS P3	33	(United States) Bud Grossenbacher	2, 4, 6
(United States) Riley Motorsports	Ave-Riley AR-2	35	(United States) Jim Cox	1
(United States) Riley Motorsports	Ave-Riley AR-2	35	(United States) Dylan Murry	1
(United States) Forty 7 Motorsports	Norma M30	40	(United States) David Grant	All
(United States) Forty 7 Motorsports	Norma M30	40	(United States) Keith Grant	All
(United States) Forty 7 Motorsports	Norma M30	40	(Canada) Parker Thompson	6
(United States) Forty 7 Motorsports	Norma M30	47	(United States) Joel Janco	All
(United States) Forty 7 Motorsports	Norma M30	47	(Brazil) J.J. Jorge	1–3, 6
(United States) Forty 7 Motorsports	Norma M30	47	(United States) Kyle Kirkwood	1, 4–6
(United States) Forty 7 Motorsports	Norma M30	74	(United States) Jon Brownson	3–6
(United States) Forty 7 Motorsports	Norma M30	74	(United States) Wyatt Schwab	3–6
(United States) CT Motorsports LLC	Norma M30	46	(United States) Scott Huffaker II	1
(United States) CT Motorsports LLC	Norma M30	46	(United States) Steven Scullen III	1
(United States) MLT Motorsports	Ligier JS P3	54	(United States) Dakota Dickerson	All
(United States) MLT Motorsports	Ligier JS P3	54	(Canada) Dean Baker	1
(United States) MLT Motorsports	Ligier JS P3	54	(United States) Dom Cicero	2–6
(United States) Wulver Racing	Ligier JS P3	60	(United States) Bruce Hamilton III	All
(United States) Wulver Racing	Ligier JS P3	60	(Estonia) Tõnis Kasemets	All
(United States) Wulver Racing	Ligier JS P3	60	(Estonia) Tristan Viidas	1, 6
(Canada) Conquest/GRS Racing	Norma M30	61	(Canada) Danny Kok	1
(Canada) Conquest/GRS Racing	Norma M30	61	(Canada) George Staikos	1
(United States) One Motorsports	Ligier JS P3	86	(United States) Paul LaHaye	1, 3–6
(United States) One Motorsports	Ligier JS P3	86	(United States) Dave House	1
(United States) One Motorsports	Ligier JS P3	86	(United States) Chip Romer	6
Entry List:

== Race results ==
Rnd	Circuit	Pole position	Race winners
1	Daytona	(United States) No. 64 K2R Motorsports	(United States) No. 47 Forty 7 Motorsports
1	Daytona	(United Kingdom) Matthew Bell (United States) Naveen Rao	(United States) Joel Janco (Brazil) J.J. Jorge (United States) Kyle Kirkwood
2	Sebring	No Qualifying (Note: Qualifying for the Sebring Round was cancelled due to heavy rain, resulting in the grid being set per the rulebook.)	(United States) No. 9 JDC MotorSports
2	Sebring	No Qualifying	(Australia) Scott Andrews (United States) Gerry Kraut
3	Road America	(United States) No. 40 Forty 7 Motorsports	(United States) No. 9 JDC MotorSports
3	Road America	(United States) David Grant (United States) Keith Grant	(Australia) Scott Andrews (United States) Gerry Kraut
4	Virginia	No Qualifying (Note: Qualifying for the Virginia Round was cancelled after barrier repairs were required following a major crash in Practice for the Michelin Pilot Challenge, the grid was set per the rulebook.)	(United States) No. 64 K2R Motorsports
4	Virginia	No Qualifying	(United Kingdom) Matthew Bell (United States) Naveen Rao
5	Mid-Ohio	(United States) No. 40 Forty 7 Motorsports	(United States) No. 54 MLT Motorsports
5	Mid-Ohio	(United States) David Grant (United States) Keith Grant	(United States) Dom Cicero (United States) Dakota Dickerson
6	Road Atlanta	(United States) No. 64 K2R Motorsports	(United States) No. 64 K2R Motorsports
6	Road Atlanta	(United Kingdom) Matthew Bell (United States) Naveen Rao	(United Kingdom) Matthew Bell (United States) Naveen Rao
Results

== Championship standings ==
=== Points system ===
Position	1	2	3	4	5	6	7	8	9	10	11	12	13	14	15	16	17	18	19	20	21	22	23	24	25	26	27	28	29	30
Race	35	32	30	28	26	25	24	23	22	21	20	19	18	17	16	15	14	13	12	11	10	9	8	7	6	5	4	3	2	1

=== Driver's Championship ===
Pos.	Drivers	DAY	SEB	ELK	VIR	MOH	ATL	Points
1	(United Kingdom) Matthew Bell (United States) Naveen Rao	**2**	3	5	1	2	**1**	190
2	(United States) Dakota Dickerson	3	4	4	4	1	6	174
3	(United States) Joel Janco	1	11	8	3	9	9	152
4	(United States) Dan Goldburg	13	6	2	9	3	8	150
5	(Australia) Scott Andrews (United States) Gerry Kraut		1	1	7	7	3	148
6	(United States) Steven Thomas	8	10	12	6	6	2	145
7	(United States) Dominic Cicero		4	4	4	1	6	144
8	(United States) David Grant (United States) Keith Grant	11	8	**3**	5	**5**	13	143
9	(Canada) Cameron Cassels	4	12	7	10	10	5	139
10	(United Kingdom) Stevan McAleer (United States) Joe Robillard	DNS	2	6	2	4	14	134
11	(United States) Bruce Hamilton III (Estonia) Tõnis Kasemets	7	13	9	8	8	7	134
12	(Sweden) Rasmus Lindh		6	2	9	3	8	132
13	(United States) Jon Brownson	6	7	13	13	11	4	132
14	(United States) Eric Palmer (United States) Greg Palmer	10	5	10	14	12	12	123
15	(United States) Max Hanratty	4	12	7	10	10		113
16	(United States) Kyle Kirkwood	1			3	9	9	109
17	(Brazil) J.J. Jorge	1	11	8			9	100
18	(United States) Paul LaHaye	9		11	12	14	11	98
19	(United States) Lance Willsey	16	9		15	13	10	92
20	(United States) Wyatt Schwab			13	13	11	4	84
21	(United States) Bud Grossenbacher		9		15		10	59
22	(United States) Thomas Merrill	8					2	55
23	(Canada) Anthony Simone	6	7					49
24	(Estonia) Tristan Viidas	7					7	48
25	(United States) Blake Mount	13			11			38
26	(Canada) Dean Baker	3						30
27	(Canada) Garett Grist (United States) Rob Hodes	5						26
28	(South Africa) Stephen Simpson						5	26
29	(United States) Dave House	9						22
30	(United States) Jon Branam				11			20
31	(United States) Chip Romer						11	20
32	(United States) Jim Cox (United States) Dylan Murry	12						19
33	(Canada) Parker Thompson						13	18
34	(Canada) Danny Kok (Canada) George Staikos	14						17
35	(United States) Scott Huffaker II (United States) Steven Scullen III	15						16
36	(United States) Anthony Lazzaro	16						15
37	(United Kingdom) Wayne Boyd (United States) Naj Husain	17						14
Pos.	Drivers	DAY	SEB	ELK	VIR	MOH	ATL	Points

Colour	Result
Gold	Winner
Silver	Second place
Bronze	Third place
Green	Points classification
Blue	Non-points classification
Blue	Non-classified finish (NC)
Purple	Retired, not classified (Ret)
Red	Did not qualify (DNQ)
Red	Did not pre-qualify (DNPQ)
Black	Disqualified (DSQ)
White	Did not start (DNS)
White	Withdrew (WD)
White	Race cancelled (C)
Blank	Did not practice (DNP)
Blank	Did not arrive (DNA)
Blank	Excluded (EX)

**Bold** - Pole position
Italics - Fastest lap

=== Team's Championship ===
Pos.	Team	Car	DAY	SEB	ELK	VIR	MOH	ATL	Points
1	#64 K2R Motorsports LLC	Ligier JS P3	**2**	3	5	1	2	**1**	190
2	#54 MLT Motorsports	Ligier JS P3	3	4	4	4	1	6	174
3	#47 Forty 7 Motorsports	Norma M30	1	11	8	3	9	9	152
4	#9 JDC MotorSports	Norma M30		1	1	7	7	3	148
5	#6 Performance Tech Motorsports	Ligier JS P3	13	6	2	11	3	8	148
6	#11 K2R Motorsports	Ligier JS P3	8	10	12	6	6	2	145
7	#40 Forty 7 Motorsports	Norma M30	11	8	**3**	5	**5**	13	143
8	#75 Performance Tech Motorsports	Ligier JS P3	4	12	7	10	10	5	139
9	#10 Robillard Racing LLC	Norma M30	DNS	2	6	2	4	14	134
10	#60 Wulver Racing	Ligier JS P3	7	13	9	8	8	7	134
11	#3 Jr III Racing	Ligier JS P3	10	5	10	14	12	12	124
12	#86 One Motorsports	Ligier JS P3	9		11	12	14	11	98
13	#33 Sean Creech Motorsport	Ligier JS P3	16	9		15	13	10	92
14	#74 Forty 7 Motorsports	Norma M30			13	13	11	4	76
15	#23 Gilbert/Korthoff Motorsports	Norma M30	6	7					49
16	#17 Nielsen Racing	Norma M30	5						26
17	#19 Performance Tech Motorsport	Ligier JS P3				9			22
18	#35 Riley Motorsports	Ave-Riley AR-2	12						19
19	#61 Conquest/GRS Racing	Norma M30	14						17
20	#46 CT Motorsports LLC	Norma M30	15						16
21	#30 Sean Creech Motorsport	Ligier JS P3	17						14
Pos.	Team	Car	DAY	SEB	ELK	VIR	MOH	ATL	Points

=== Bronze Driver's Cup ===
Pos.	Drivers	DAY	SEB	ELK	VIR	MOH	ATL	Points
1	(United States) Steven Thomas	1	3	3	2	2	1	194
2	(United States) David Grant (United States) Keith Grant	3	1	1	1	1		170
3	(United States) Paul LaHaye	2		2	3	4	3	152
4	(United States) Lance Willsey	5	2		4	3	2	148
5	(United States) Bud Grossenbacher		2		4		2	92
6	(United States) Thomas Merrill	1					1	70
7	(United States) Dave House	2						32
8	(United States) Chip Romer						3	30
9	(Canada) Danny Kok (Canada) George Staikos	4						28
10	(United States) Anthony Lazzaro	5						26
Pos.	Drivers	DAY	SEB	ELK	VIR	MOH	ATL	Points
