= Kris Wright =

American racing driver (born 1994)

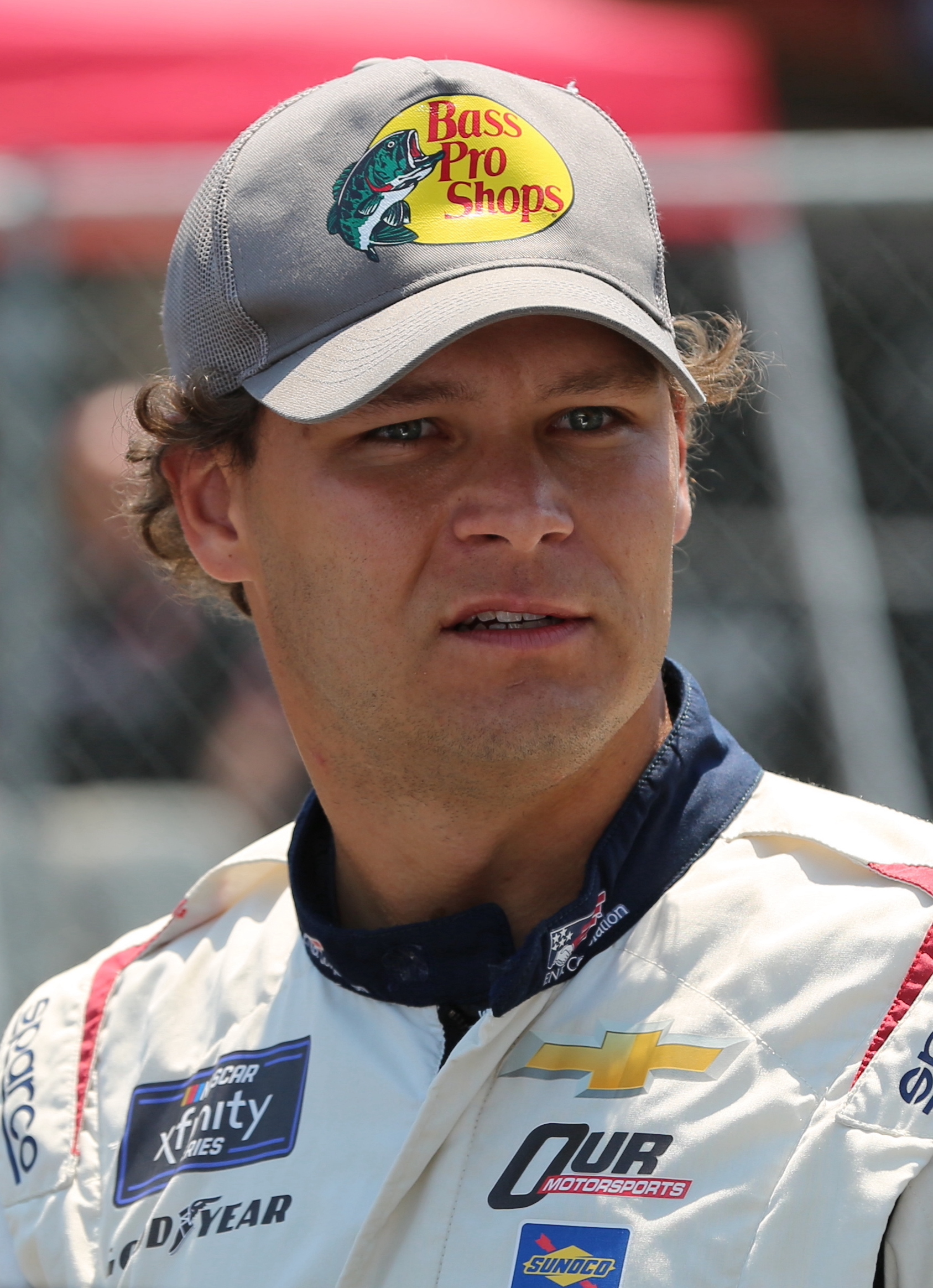
- Wright at Sonoma Raceway in 2025
- Born: Kristofer Cole Wright; July 17, 1994 (age 32); Pittsburgh, Pennsylvania, U.S.

NASCAR O'Reilly Auto Parts Series career
- 34 races run over 3 years
- 2025 position: 35th
- Best finish: 35th (2025)
- First race: 2021 Super Start Batteries 188 (Daytona RC)
- Last race: 2025 Pit Boss/FoodMaxx 250 (Sonoma)
| Wins | Top tens | Poles |
|---|---|---|
| 0 | 1 | 0 |

NASCAR FedEx Freight Truck Series career
- 74 races run over 7 years
- 2026 position: 24th
- Best finish: 24th (2026)
- First race: 2020 Sunoco 159 (Daytona RC)
- Last race: 2026 Craftsman 200 (Homestead)
| Wins | Top tens | Poles |
|---|---|---|
| 0 | 0 | 0 |

ARCA Menards Series career
- 38 races run over 6 years
- Best finish: 3rd (2024)
- First race: 2020 VizCom 200 (Michigan)
- Last race: 2025 Reese's 150 (Kansas)
| Wins | Top tens | Poles |
|---|---|---|
| 0 | 23 | 0 |

ARCA Menards Series East career
- 7 races run over 3 years
- Best finish: 12th (2024)
- First race: 2020 Bush's Beans 200 (Bristol)
- Last race: 2025 Atlas 150 (Iowa)
| Wins | Top tens | Poles |
|---|---|---|
| 0 | 3 | 0 |

ARCA Menards Series West career
- 5 races run over 3 years
- Best finish: 14th (2020)
- First race: 2020 ENEOS/Sunrise Ford Twin 30 Race #1 (Tooele)
- Last race: 2024 General Tire 150 (Phoenix)
| Wins | Top tens | Poles |
|---|---|---|
| 0 | 2 | 0 |

Championship titles
- 2018: IMSA Prototype Challenge LMP3

Awards
- 2017: IMSA Prototype Challenge Rookie of the Year
- Statistics up to date as of November 6, 2026.

Kristofer Cole Wright (born July 17, 1994) is an American professional stock car racing driver. He last competed full-time in the NASCAR Craftsman Truck Series, driving the No. 81 Chevrolet Silverado RST for McAnally–Hilgemann Racing. He has also previously competed in sports car racing, open-wheel racing, the Euroformula Open Championship, the NASCAR Xfinity Series, and the ARCA Menards Series. Wright is also the 2018 IMSA Prototype Challenge LMP3 class champion.

== Racing career ==
=== Sports car racing ===
In 2015, Wright joined Kinetic Motorsports in the Pirelli World Challenge Touring Car A class. He recorded his first podium finish at Miller Motorsports Park where he finished third.

In 2017, Wright raced in the IMSA Prototype Challenge with JDC MotorSports. Wright, who described the prototype cars as "really easy to drive", finished second in the Prototype Challenge standings with a win at Watkins Glen International and Rookie of the Year honors. He signed with Extreme Speed Motorsports for the 2018 Prototype Challenge season, during which he scored race wins at Barber Motorsports Park and Virginia International Raceway, finished in podium range in all six events, and won the LMP3 class championship.

Wright ran his first endurance and WeatherTech SportsCar Championship race at the 2019 24 Hours of Daytona, driving for Performance Tech Motorsports in the LMP2 class. Joined by Kyle Masson, Robert Masson, and Cameron Cassels in the No. 38, Wright's team finished second in its class.

=== Open-wheel racing ===
During the 2017 racing season, Wright entered the Road to Indy ladder beginning with the U.S. F2000 National Championship with John Cummiskey Racing. He raced at the Grand Prix of St. Petersburg, Barber, and the Indianapolis Motor Speedway road course before moving to the Pro Mazda Championship in June with JDC. He contested the Road America, Mid-Ohio Sports Car Course, and Watkins Glen races, with a best finish of fifth at Watkins Glen.

In 2019, he started racing in the BRDC British Formula 3 Championship with Fortec Motorsports after testing with the team the previous year; Wright compared the car to the Pro Mazda vehicles, noting they were "very similar". He finished the season sixteenth in points, last among drivers who ran the full schedule, with a best finish of fifth at Silverstone Circuit.

Wright remained with Fortec as he moved to the Euroformula Open Championship in 2020, though the season's start was impacted by the COVID-19 pandemic.

=== Stock car racing ===
Wright's first start in stock car racing took place during the summer of 2020. In June, he raced in the ARCA Menards Series West doubleheader at Utah Motorsports Campus, where he finished second and third.

In August, Wright joined the GMS Racing organization, racing in the ARCA Menards Series and the NASCAR Gander RV & Outdoors Truck Series on a part-time basis. His debut with the team came on August 1 in the CARS Super Late Model Tour at Hickory Motor Speedway, where he finished eleventh. His first ARCA and NASCAR Truck start for GMS took place at Michigan International Speedway and the Daytona International Speedway road course, respectively.

Wright joined Young's Motorsports for the full 2021 NASCAR Truck Series season, driving the No. 02; he also debuted the team's ARCA program at the Daytona test in January. After running the season opener, he also signed with NASCAR Xfinity Series team Sam Hunt Racing as a road course ringer. Wright missed the Atlanta Motor Speedway race in March after testing positive for COVID-19.

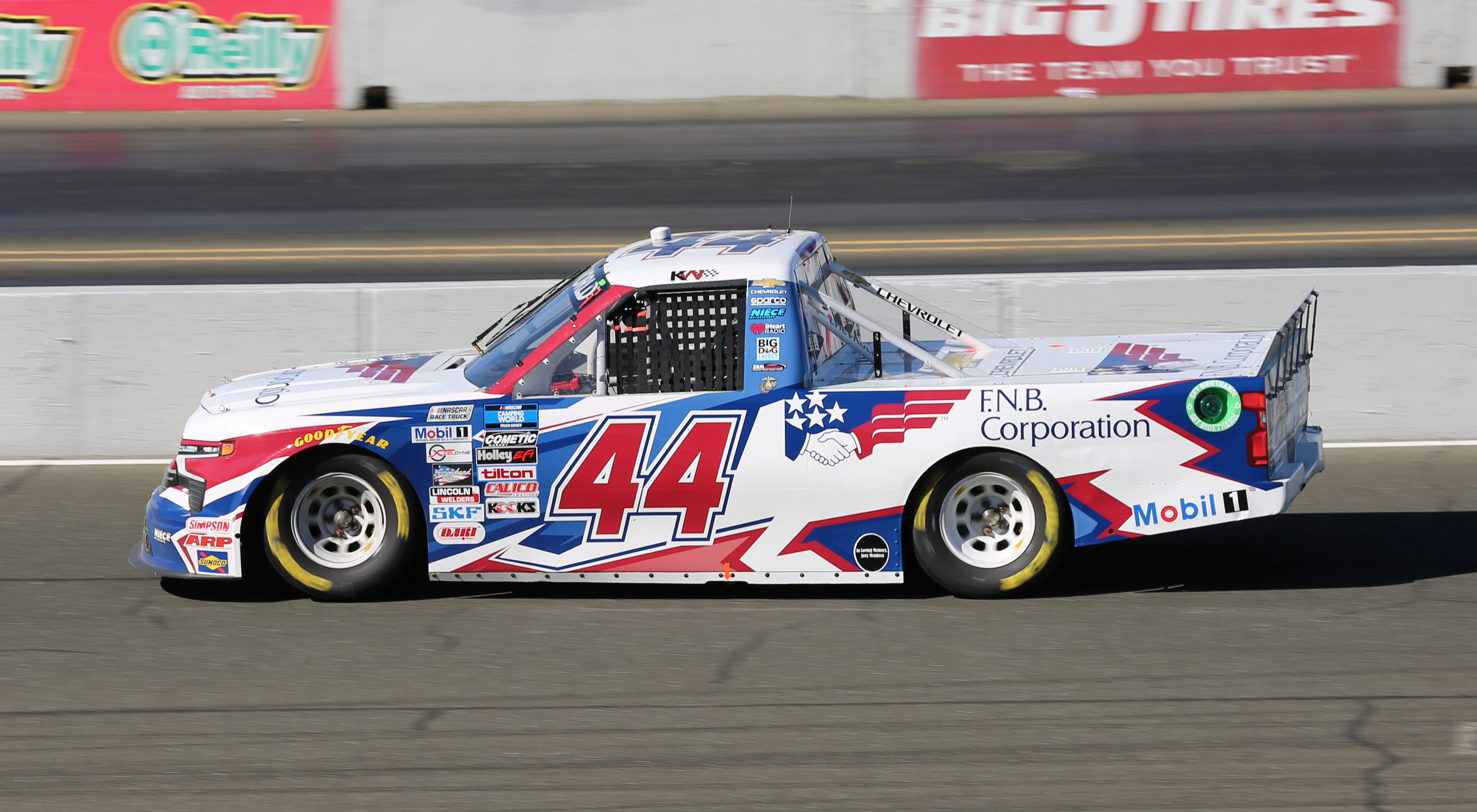
Wright's No. 44 truck at Sonoma Raceway in 2022

For 2022, Wright would be announced to drive the No. 44 Niece Motorsports Chevrolet full-time, but would later leave the team in August. However, Wright was announced to run the rest of the Xfinity Series season with Brandonbilt Motorsports from August onwards, excluding three races which owner Brandon Brown himself drove, and the car having sponsorship from FNB Corporation.

On February 8, 2023, it was announced that Wright would return to the same truck he drove in 2021, the No. 02 for Young's Motorsports, and run full-time in the Truck Series in 2023. After earning only three top twenty finishes in the first eleven races, Wright and the team would agree to part ways effective immediately before the race at World Wide Technology Raceway.

On November 14, 2023, it was announced that Wright would run full-time in the ARCA Menards Series in 2024, driving the No. 15 Toyota for Venturini Motorsports. Wright also raced for Tricon Garage in two races in 2024.

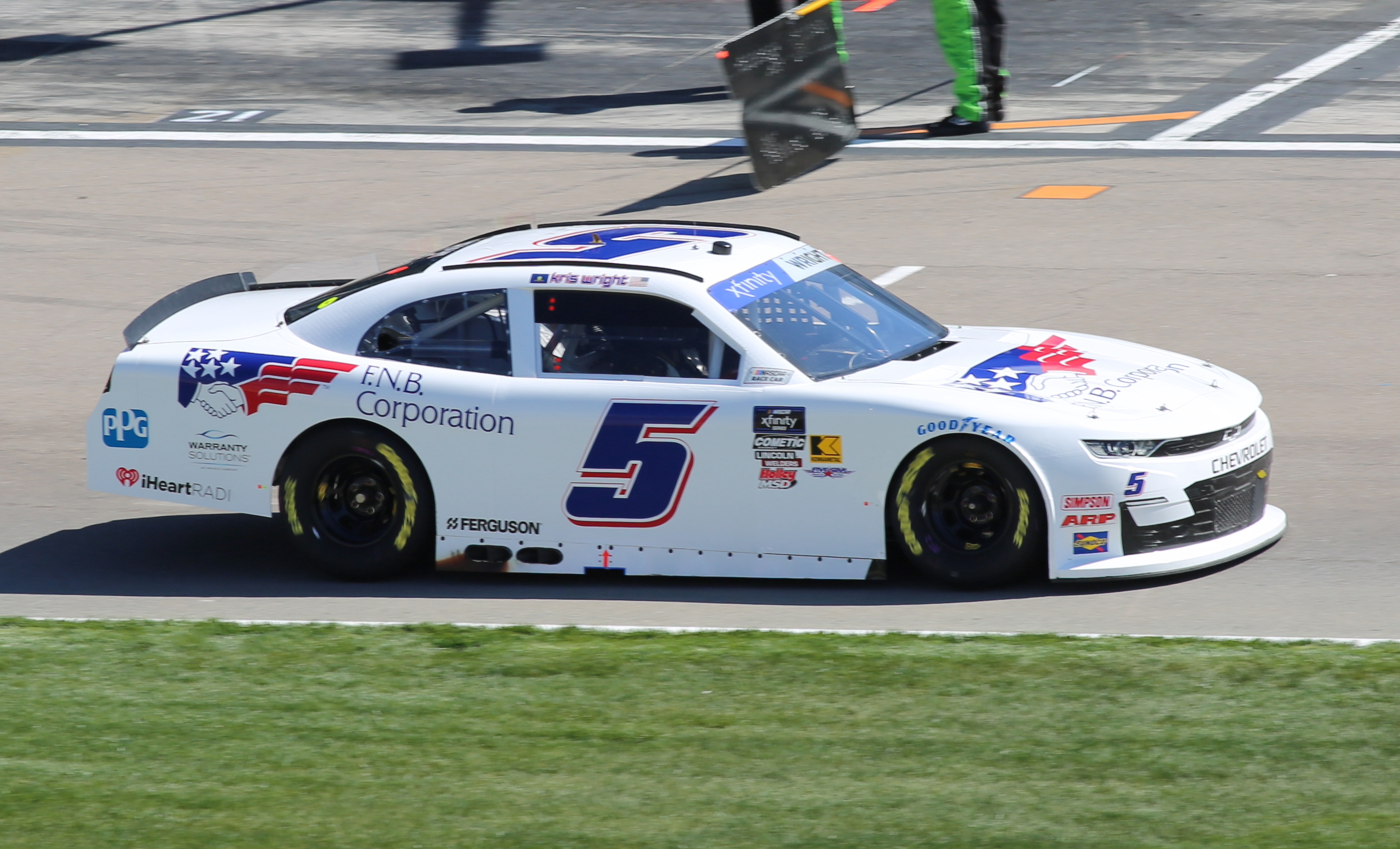
Wright's No. 5 car at Las Vegas Motor Speedway in 2025

On November 20, 2024, Our Motorsports announced that Wright would replace Anthony Alfredo as the driver of the No. 5 Chevrolet for the 2025 NASCAR Xfinity Series season. On July 15, after Kaz Grala replaced Wright in entry list for Dover, Wright confirmed he had mutually parted ways with the team. At the time, Wright was 29th in the standings, last among full-time drivers, and had only scored three top twenty finishes.

On July 28, 2025, it was announced that Wright would return to Venturini's ARCA team part-time for three races.

On September 29, 2025, it was announced that Wright would join McAnally–Hilgemann Racing's Truck team for Charlotte Roval and Talladega.

On December 9, 2025, MHR announced that Wright would replace Connor Mosack as the driver of the No. 81 Chevrolet for the 2026 NASCAR Craftsman Truck Series season.

== Personal life ==
Wright's father was also a racing driver, though he encouraged his son to play golf. After graduating from Central Catholic High School in Pittsburgh in 2013, Wright was a member of IMG Academy and Robert Morris University's golf teams. He also qualified for the district championship of the Remax World Long Drive Championship in 2014, but came up short on his bid for the World Finals.

== Motorsports career results ==
=== Racing career summary ===
| Season | Series | Team | Races | Wins | Top 5 | Top 10 | Points | Position |
|---|---|---|---|---|---|---|---|---|
| 2014 | SBF2000 Summer Series | | 6 | 0 | 1 | 3 | 141 | 20th |
| 2015 | Pirelli World Challenge – TCA | Kinetic Motorsports | 17 | 0 | 8 | 14 | 1190 | 5th |
| 2016 | Pirelli World Challenge – TCA | Kinetic Motorsports | 10 | 0 | 4 | 6 | 547 | 8th |
| 2016 | Continental Tire SportsCar Challenge | Kris Wright Motorsports | 9 | 0 | 0 | 1 | 150 | 16th |
| 2017 | IMSA Prototype Challenge – MPC | JDC MotorSports | 13 | 1 | 8 | 12 | 177 | **2nd** |
| 2017 | USF2000 Championship | John Cummiskey Racing | 6 | 0 | 0 | 0 | 28 | 25th |
| 2017 | Pro Mazda Championship | JDC MotorSports | 7 | 0 | 1 | 5 | 95 | 10th |
| 2018 | IMSA Prototype Challenge – LMP3 | Extreme Speed Motorsports | 6 | 2 | 6 | 6 | 194 | **1st** |
| 2018 | Pro Mazda Championship | BN Racing | 10 | 0 | 1 | 5 | 110 | 12th |
| 2018 | Porsche Carrera Cup Germany | MSG / HRT Motorsport | ? | ? | ? | ? | 0 | NC |
| 2019 | BRDC British Formula 3 Championship | Fortec Motorsport | 24 | 0 | 1 | 2 | 126 | 16th |
| 2019 | IMSA Sports Car Championship – LMP2 | Performance Tech Motorsports | 1 | 0 | 1 | 1 | 32 | 10th |
| 2020 | ARCA Menards Series | GMS Racing | 1 | 0 | 0 | 0 | 193 | 22nd |
| 2020 | ARCA Menards Series | Chad Bryant Racing | 5 | 0 | 0 | 3 | 193 | 22nd |
| 2020 | ARCA Menards Series East | Chad Bryant Racing | 1 | 0 | 0 | 0 | 29 | 44th |
| 2020 | ARCA Menards Series West | Chad Bryant Racing | 1 | 0 | 0 | 0 | 159 | 14th |
| 2020 | ARCA Menards Series West | JP Racing | 2 | 0 | 2 | 2 | 159 | 14th |
| 2020 | CARS Super Late Model Tour | David Pletcher | 2 | 0 | 0 | 1 | 47 | 15th |
| 2020 | NASCAR Gander Outdoors Truck Series | GMS Racing | 1 | 0 | 0 | 0 | 18 | 66th |
| 2021 | ARCA Menards Series | Rette Jones Racing | 5 | 0 | 0 | 3 | 161 | 26th |
| 2021 | NASCAR Xfinity Series | Sam Hunt Racing | 7 | 0 | 0 | 0 | 0 | NC |
| 2021 | NASCAR Camping World Truck Series | Young's Motorsports | 16 | 0 | 0 | 0 | 166 | 26th |
| 2022 | ARCA Menards Series | Cook Racing Technologies | 1 | 0 | 0 | 1 | 75 | 47th |
| 2022 | ARCA Menards Series | Young's Motorsports | 1 | 0 | 0 | 1 | 75 | 47th |
| 2022 | NASCAR Xfinity Series | Brandonbilt Motorsports | 9 | 0 | 0 | 0 | 0 | NC† |
| 2022 | NASCAR Camping World Truck Series | Niece Motorsports | 17 | 0 | 0 | 0 | 195 | 30th |
| 2023 | ARCA Menards Series | Venturini Motorsports | 2 | 0 | 0 | 1 | 72 | 55th |
| 2023 | ARCA Menards Series West | Venturini Motorsports | 1 | 0 | 0 | 0 | 22 | 66th |
| 2023 | CARS Pro Late Model Tour | N/A | 3 | 0 | 0 | 0 | 63 | 27th |
| 2023 | NASCAR Craftsman Truck Series | Young's Motorsports | 11 | 0 | 0 | 0 | 150 | 29th |
| 2024 | ARCA Menards Series | Venturini Motorsports | 20 | 0 | 8 | 12 | 878 | **3rd** |
| 2024 | ARCA Menards Series East | Venturini Motorsports | 5 | 0 | 1 | 3 | 225 | 12th |
| 2024 | ARCA Menards Series West | Venturini Motorsports | 1 | 0 | 0 | 0 | 32 | 53rd |
| 2024 | CARS Pro Late Model Tour | Wilson Motorsports | 2 | 0 | 0 | 1 | 0 | NC† |
| 2024 | NASCAR Craftsman Truck Series | Tricon Garage | 2 | 0 | 0 | 0 | 18 | 56th |
| 2025 | ARCA Menards Series | Venturini Motorsports | 3 | 0 | 2 | 2 | 101 | 44th |
| 2025 | ARCA Menards Series East | Venturini Motorsports | 1 | 0 | 0 | 0 | 20 | 69th |
| 2025 | NASCAR Xfinity Series | Our Motorsports | 18 | 0 | 0 | 1 | 177 | 35th |
| 2025 | NASCAR Craftsman Truck Series | McAnally–Hilgemann Racing | 2 | 0 | 0 | 0 | 0 | NC† |
| 2026 | NASCAR Craftsman Truck Series | McAnally–Hilgemann Racing | 25 | 0 | 0 | 0 | 277 | 24th |

^{†} As Wright was a guest driver, he was ineligible for championship points.

=== U.S. F2000 National Championship ===
| Year | Team | 1 | 2 | 3 | 4 | 5 | 6 | 7 | 8 | 9 | 10 | 11 | 12 | 13 | 14 | Rank | Points |
|---|---|---|---|---|---|---|---|---|---|---|---|---|---|---|---|---|---|
| 2017 | Kaminsky Racing | STP; 14 | STP; 15 | BAR; 13 | BAR; 19 | IMS; 21 | IMS; 17 | ROA | ROA | IOW | TOR | TOR | MOH | MOH | WGL | 25th | 28 |

==== Pro Mazda Championship ====
| Year | Team | 1 | 2 | 3 | 4 | 5 | 6 | 7 | 8 | 9 | 10 | 11 | 12 | 13 | 14 | 15 | 16 | Rank | Points |
|---|---|---|---|---|---|---|---|---|---|---|---|---|---|---|---|---|---|---|---|
| 2017 | JDC MotorSports | STP | STP | IMS | IMS | ROA; 13 | ROA; 9 | MOH; 7 | MOH; 8 | MOH; 11 | GMP | WGL; 5 | WGL; 8 | | | | | 10th | 95 |
| 2018 | BN Racing | STP; 12 | STP; 14 | BAR; 13 | BAR; 14 | IMS; 10 | IMS; 6 | LOR | ROA | ROA | TOR; 7 | TOR; 5 | MOH; 10 | MOH; 10 | GMP | POR | POR | 12th | 110 |

=== Complete BRDC British Formula 3 Championship results ===
(key) (Races in bold indicate pole position; races in italics indicate fastest lap)

| Year | Team | 1 | 2 | 3 | 4 | 5 | 6 | 7 | 8 | 9 | 10 | 11 | 12 | 13 | 14 | 15 | 16 | 17 | 18 | 19 | 20 | 21 | 22 | 23 | 24 | DC | Points |
|---|---|---|---|---|---|---|---|---|---|---|---|---|---|---|---|---|---|---|---|---|---|---|---|---|---|---|---|
| 2019 | Fortec Motorsport | OUL; 1; 11 | OUL; 2 Ret | OUL; 3; 16 | SNE; 1; 15 | SNE; 2; 12 | SNE; 3; 10 | SIL1; 1; 13 | SIL1; 2; 17 | SIL1; 3; 18 | DON1; 1; 14 | DON1; 2; 13 | DON1; 3 Ret | SPA; 1; 16 | SPA; 2; 17 | SPA; 3; 15 | BRH; 1; 16 | BRH; 2 Ret | BRH; 3; 13 | SIL2; 1; 14 | SIL2; 2; 5 | SIL2; 3; 15 | DON2; 1; 15 | DON2; 2; 11 | DON2; 3; 14 | 16th | 126 |

=== WeatherTech SportsCar Championship results ===
(key)(Races in bold indicate pole position. Races in italics indicate fastest race lap in class. Results are overall/class)

| Year | Entrant | Class | Chassis | Engine | 1 | 2 | 3 | 4 | 5 | 6 | 7 | 8 | Rank | Points |
|---|---|---|---|---|---|---|---|---|---|---|---|---|---|---|
| 2019 | Performance Tech Motorsports | LMP2 | Oreca 07 | Gibson GK428 4.2 L V8 | DAY; 2 | SEB | MOH | WGL | MOS | ELK | LGA | ATL | 10th | 32 |

=== NASCAR ===
(key) (Bold – Pole position awarded by qualifying time. Italics – Pole position earned by points standings or practice time. * – Most laps led.)

==== Xfinity Series ====
NASCAR Xfinity Series results
| Year | Team | No. | Make | 1 | 2 | 3 | 4 | 5 | 6 | 7 | 8 | 9 | 10 | 11 | 12 | 13 | 14 | 15 | 16 | 17 | 18 | 19 | 20 | 21 | 22 | 23 | 24 | 25 | 26 | 27 | 28 | 29 | 30 | 31 | 32 | 33 | NXSC | Pts | Ref |
|---|---|---|---|---|---|---|---|---|---|---|---|---|---|---|---|---|---|---|---|---|---|---|---|---|---|---|---|---|---|---|---|---|---|---|---|---|---|---|---|
| 2021 | Sam Hunt Racing | 26 | Toyota | DAY | DRC; 18 | HOM | LVS | PHO | ATL | MAR | TAL | DAR | DOV | COA; 32 | CLT | MOH; 32 | TEX | NSH | POC | ROA; 25 | ATL | NHA | GLN; 17 | IRC; 30 | MCH | DAY | DAR | RCH | BRI | LVS | TAL | | | | | | 93rd | 0^{1} | |
| 2021 | Sam Hunt Racing with JD Motorsports | 15 | Toyota | | | | | | | | | | | | | | | | | | | | | | | | | | | | | ROV; 39 | TEX | KAN | MAR | PHO | 93rd | 0^{1} | |
| 2022 | Brandonbilt Motorsports | 68 | Chevy | DAY | CAL | LVS | PHO | ATL | COA | RCH | MAR | TAL | DOV | DAR | TEX | CLT | PIR | NSH | ROA | ATL | NHA | POC | IRC | MCH | GLN; 34 | DAY | DAR; 36 | KAN; 20 | BRI; 25 | TEX | TAL | ROV; 38 | LVS; 24 | HOM; 27 | MAR; 26 | PHO; 26 | 99th | 0^{1} | |
| 2025 | Our Motorsports | 5 | Chevy | DAY; 32 | ATL; 26 | COA; 33 | PHO; 25 | LVS; 25 | HOM; 32 | MAR; 9 | DAR; 38 | BRI; 31 | CAR; 28 | TAL; 24 | TEX; 33 | CLT; 18 | NSH; 31 | MXC; 17 | POC; 37 | ATL; 25 | CSC; DNQ | SON; 29 | DOV | IND | IOW | GLN | DAY | PIR | GTW | BRI | KAN | ROV | LVS | TAL | MAR | PHO | 35th | 177 | |

==== Craftsman Truck Series ====
NASCAR Craftsman Truck Series results
| Year | Team | No. | Make | 1 | 2 | 3 | 4 | 5 | 6 | 7 | 8 | 9 | 10 | 11 | 12 | 13 | 14 | 15 | 16 | 17 | 18 | 19 | 20 | 21 | 22 | 23 | 24 | 25 | NCTC | Pts | Ref |
|---|---|---|---|---|---|---|---|---|---|---|---|---|---|---|---|---|---|---|---|---|---|---|---|---|---|---|---|---|---|---|---|
| 2020 | GMS Racing | 24 | Chevy | DAY | LVS | CLT | ATL | HOM | POC | KEN | TEX | KAN | KAN | MCH | DRC; 25 | DOV | GTW | DAR | RCH | BRI | LVS | TAL | KAN | TEX | MAR | PHO | | | 66th | 18 | |
| 2021 | Young's Motorsports | 02 | Chevy | DAY; 12 | DRC | LVS; 25 | ATL | BRD | RCH; 35 | KAN; 33 | DAR; 39 | COA | CLT; 23 | TEX; 22 | NSH; 32 | POC; 30 | KNX | GLN | GTW; 18 | DAR; 28 | BRI; 36 | LVS; 16 | TAL; 36 | MAR; 13 | PHO; 32 | | | | 26th | 166 | |
| 2022 | Niece Motorsports | 44 | Chevy | DAY; 19 | LVS; 17 | ATL; 21 | COA; 15 | MAR; 30 | BRD; 33 | DAR; 33 | KAN; 25 | TEX; 35 | CLT; 19 | GTW; 33 | SON; 26 | KNX; 28 | NSH; 17 | MOH; 25 | POC; 27 | IRP; 31 | RCH | KAN | BRI | TAL | HOM | PHO | | | 30th | 195 | |
| 2023 | Young's Motorsports | 02 | Chevy | DAY; 22 | LVS; 28 | ATL; 15 | COA; 21 | TEX; 12 | BRD; 32 | MAR; 16 | KAN; 28 | DAR; 29 | NWS; 22 | CLT; 32 | GTW | NSH | MOH | POC | RCH | IRP | MLW | KAN | BRI | TAL | HOM | PHO | | | 29th | 150 | |
| 2024 | Tricon Garage | 1 | Toyota | DAY | ATL | LVS | BRI | COA | MAR | TEX; 30 | KAN | DAR | NWS | CLT | GTW | NSH | POC; 26 | IRP | RCH | MLW | BRI | KAN | TAL | HOM | MAR | PHO | | | 56th | 18 | |
| 2025 | McAnally–Hilgemann Racing | 16 | Chevy | DAY | ATL | LVS | HOM | MAR | BRI | CAR | TEX | KAN | NWS | CLT | NSH | MCH | POC | LRP | IRP | GLN | RCH | DAR | BRI | NHA | ROV; 26 | TAL; 11 | MAR | PHO | 91st | 0^{1} | |
| 2026 | McAnally–Hilgemann Racing | 81 | Chevy | DAY; 25 | ATL; 18 | STP; 19 | DAR; 33 | CAR; 19 | BRI; 25 | TEX; 31 | GLN; 29 | DOV; 17 | CLT; 31 | NSH; 23 | MCH; 31 | COR; 13 | LRP; 17 | NWS; 30 | IRP; 31 | RCH; 31 | NHA; 34 | BRI; 27 | KAN; 36 | CLT; 25 | PHO; 26 | TAL; 32 | MAR; 21 | HOM; 24 | 24th | 277 | |

^{*} Season still in progress
^{1} Ineligible for series points

=== ARCA Menards Series ===
(key) (Bold – Pole position awarded by qualifying time. Italics – Pole position earned by points standings or practice time. * – Most laps led.)

ARCA Menards Series results
| Year | Team | No. | Make | 1 | 2 | 3 | 4 | 5 | 6 | 7 | 8 | 9 | 10 | 11 | 12 | 13 | 14 | 15 | 16 | 17 | 18 | 19 | 20 | AMSC | Pts | Ref |
|---|---|---|---|---|---|---|---|---|---|---|---|---|---|---|---|---|---|---|---|---|---|---|---|---|---|---|
| 2020 | GMS Racing | 21 | Chevy | DAY | PHO | TAL | POC | IRP | KEN | IOW | KAN | TOL | TOL | MCH; 14 | DRC | | | | | | | | | 22nd | 193 | |
| 2020 | Chad Bryant Racing | 22 | Chevy | | | | | | | | | | | | | GTW; 18 | L44; 7 | TOL | | | MEM; 10 | ISF | | 22nd | 193 | |
| 2020 | Chad Bryant Racing | 12 | Chevy | | | | | | | | | | | | | | | | BRI; 15 | WIN | | | KAN; 7 | 22nd | 193 | |
| 2021 | Rette Jones Racing | 30 | Ford | DAY | PHO | TAL | KAN | TOL | CLT | MOH; 8 | POC; 24 | ELK | BLN | IOW | WIN; 8 | GLN; 13 | MCH | ISF | MLW | DSF | BRI | SLM | KAN; 6 | 26th | 161 | |
| 2022 | Cook Racing Technologies | 42 | Chevy | DAY | PHO | TAL | KAN | CLT | IOW | BLN | ELK | MOH; 6 | | | | | | | | | | | | 47th | 75 | |
| 2022 | Young's Motorsports | 02 | Chevy | | | | | | | | | | POC; 8 | IRP | MCH | GLN | ISF | MLW | DSF | KAN | BRI | SLM | TOL | 47th | 75 | |
| 2023 | Venturini Motorsports | 55 | Toyota | DAY | PHO | TAL | KAN | CLT | BLN | ELK | MOH | IOW | POC | MCH; 11 | IRP | | | | | | | | | 55th | 72 | |
| 2023 | Venturini Motorsports | 15 | Toyota | | | | | | | | | | | | | GLN; 6 | ISF | MLW | DSF | KAN | BRI | SLM | TOL | 55th | 72 | |
| 2024 | Venturini Motorsports | 15 | Toyota | DAY; 38 | PHO; 12 | TAL; 2 | DOV; 6 | KAN; 4 | CLT; 18 | IOW; 16 | MOH; 18 | BLN; 4 | IRP; 6 | SLM; 10 | ELK; 3 | MCH; 5 | ISF; 7 | MLW; 4 | DSF; 4 | GLN; 12 | BRI; 13 | KAN; 18 | TOL; 3 | 3rd | 878 | |
| 2025 | Venturini Motorsports | 15 | Toyota | DAY | PHO | TAL | KAN | CLT | MCH | BLN | ELK | LRP | DOV | IRP | IOW; 24 | GLN; 3 | ISF | MAD | DSF | BRI | SLM | KAN; 4 | TOL | 44th | 101 | |

==== ARCA Menards Series East ====
ARCA Menards Series East results
| Year | Team | No. | Make | 1 | 2 | 3 | 4 | 5 | 6 | 7 | 8 | AMSEC | Pts | Ref |
|---|---|---|---|---|---|---|---|---|---|---|---|---|---|---|
| 2020 | Chad Bryant Racing | 12 | Chevy | NSM | TOL | DOV | TOL | BRI; 15 | FIF | | | 44th | 29 | |
| 2024 | Venturini Motorsports | 15 | Toyota | FIF | DOV; 6 | NSV | FRS | IOW; 16 | IRP; 6 | MLW; 4 | BRI; 13 | 12th | 225 | |
| 2025 | Venturini Motorsports | 15 | Toyota | FIF | CAR | NSV | FRS | DOV | IRP | IOW; 24 | BRI | 69th | 20 | |

==== ARCA Menards Series West ====
ARCA Menards Series West results
| Year | Team | No. | Make | 1 | 2 | 3 | 4 | 5 | 6 | 7 | 8 | 9 | 10 | 11 | 12 | AMSWC | Pts | Ref |
|---|---|---|---|---|---|---|---|---|---|---|---|---|---|---|---|---|---|---|
| 2020 | JP Racing | 7 | Ford | LVS | MMP; 2 | MMP; 3 | IRW | EVG | DCS | CNS | LVS | AAS | KCR | | | 14th | 159 | |
| 2020 | Chad Bryant Racing | 22 | Chevy | | | | | | | | | | | PHO; 18 | | 14th | 159 | |
| 2023 | Venturini Motorsports | 55 | Toyota | PHO | IRW | KCR | PIR | SON | IRW | SHA | EVG | AAS | LVS | MAD | PHO; 22 | 66th | 22 | |
| 2024 | Venturini Motorsports | 15 | Toyota | PHO; 12 | KER | PIR | SON | IRW | IRW | SHA | TRI | MAD | AAS | KER | PHO | 53rd | 32 | |

=== CARS Super Late Model Tour ===
(key)

CARS Super Late Model Tour results
| Year | Team | No. | Make | 1 | 2 | 3 | 4 | 5 | 6 | 7 | 8 | CSLMTC | Pts | Ref |
|---|---|---|---|---|---|---|---|---|---|---|---|---|---|---|
| 2020 | David Pletcher | 21 | Chevy | SNM | HCY | JEN | HCY; 11 | FCS | BRI | FLC; 8 | NSH | 15th | 47 | |

=== CARS Pro Late Model Tour ===
(key)

CARS Pro Late Model Tour results
| Year | Team | No. | Make | 1 | 2 | 3 | 4 | 5 | 6 | 7 | 8 | 9 | 10 | 11 | 12 | 13 | CPLMTC | Pts | Ref |
|---|---|---|---|---|---|---|---|---|---|---|---|---|---|---|---|---|---|---|---|
| 2023 | N/A | 02 | Chevy | SNM | HCY | ACE | NWS; DNQ | TCM | DIL | CRW | WKS | | | | | | 27th | 63 | |
| 2023 | N/A | 27W | Chevy | | | | | | | | | HCY; 15 | TCM | SBO; 11 | TCM; 11 | CRW | 27th | 63 | |
| 2024 | Wilson Motorsports | 20 | N/A | SNM; 9* | HCY; 26 | OCS | ACE | TCM | CRW | HCY | NWS | ACE | FLC | SBO | TCM | NWS | N/A | 0 | |

=== ASA STARS National Tour ===
(key) (Bold – Pole position awarded by qualifying time. Italics – Pole position earned by points standings or practice time. * – Most laps led. ** – All laps led.)

ASA STARS National Tour results
| Year | Team | No. | Make | 1 | 2 | 3 | 4 | 5 | 6 | 7 | 8 | 9 | 10 | ASNTC | Pts | Ref |
|---|---|---|---|---|---|---|---|---|---|---|---|---|---|---|---|---|
| 2024 | Wilson Motorsports | 20 | Toyota | NSM; 32 | FIF | HCY | MAD | MLW | AND | OWO | TOL | WIN | NSV | 98th | 20 | |
