= IMSA Prototype Challenge =

Motorsport series

- Category: Sports car racing
- Country: United States, Canada
- Inaugural season: 2006
- Folded: 2022
- Classes: LMP3
- Last Drivers' champion: (Estonia) Tõnis Kasemets
- Last Teams' champion: Wulver Racing
- Official website: IMSA Official Site

IMSA Prototype Challenge (formerly IMSA Prototype Lites) was a racing series featuring two classes of single-seat prototype cars racing simultaneously. The series was sanctioned by the International Motor Sports Association (IMSA). Most races were held in support of the WeatherTech SportsCar Championship. The series raced LMP3 class prototype sportscars. The cars have grown in size and speed since its 2006 introduction, starting from four-cylinder and motorcycle powered race cars to large V8 powered cars. Each race was 1 hour and 45 minutes long apart from the season opening 3 hour race at Daytona International Speedway.

The series' final season was in 2022. For 2023, the series was replaced with the IMSA VP Racing SportsCar Challenge.

== Car Specifications ==
=== LMP3 Class ===
Minimum weight	930 kilograms (2,050 lb)
Maximum length	4,650 millimetres (183 in)
Maximum width	1,900 millimetres (75 in)
Engine	Naturally aspirated Nissan V8 5.6L
Fuel tank size	85 litres (22 US gal)
Maximum wheel diameter	28 inches (710 mm)
Maximum wheel width	13 inches (330 mm)

=== Former classes ===
MPC Class

- Engine: 2.0-liter, Naturally aspirated Mazda MZR engine
- Gearbox: 6 Speed Sequential Manual Transmission
- Weight: 1,425 lb (646 kg) with driver
- Fuel Delivery: Electronic fuel injection

L2 Class

- Engine: 2.3-liter, Naturally aspirated Mazda MP2
- Gearbox: 6 Speed Sequential Manual Transmission
- Weight: 1,425 lb (646 kg) with driver
- Fuel Delivery: Electronic fuel injection

L2 Class 2006-2012 only

- Engine: 1000cc Naturally aspirated Kawasaki or Suzuki
- Weight: 1,100 lb (500 kg) with driver

L3 Class 2006-2009 only, class discontinued for 2010

- Engine: 2.3-liter, Naturally aspirated Mazda MZR
- Weight: 1,350 lb (612 kg) with driver

== Champions ==
Season	Class	Driver Champion	Masters Champion	Team Champion
2006	L1	(United States) Adam Pecorari	n/a	(United States) Cape Motorsports
2006	L2	(United States) Dan McBreen	n/a	PVM Racing
2006	L3	(United States) Robert Mumm	n/a	n/a
2007	L1	(Puerto Rico) Gerardo Bonilla	n/a	(United States) B-K Motorsports
2007	L2	(United States) Robby Card	n/a	PVM Racing
2007	L3	(United States) Richard Spicer	n/a	(United States) Spicer-Hagerman
2008	L1	(United States) Jonathan Goring	(United States) Jon Brownson	(United States) Comprent Motorsports
2008	L2	(Australia) Tom Drewer	(United States) Eric Vassian	(United States) WEST Racing
2008	L3	(United States) Chris Funk	(United States) Chris Funk	KC Racing
2009	L1	(United States) Joel Feinberg	(United States) Gary Gibson	(United States) Eurosport Racing
2009	L2	(United States) John Weisberg	(United States) Alain Nadal	(United States) Berg Racing
2009	L3	(United States) Chris Doyle	(United States) Chris Funk	Surface Exploration
2010	L1	(United States) Charlie Shears	(United States) Charlie Shears	(United States) Core Autosport
2010	L2	(United States) John Weisberg	(United States) Jim Garrett	(United States) Berg Racing
2011	L1	(Puerto Rico) Ricardo Vera	(United States) Daniel Mancini	(United States) Eurosport
2011	L2	(Canada) Robert Sabato	(United States) Alan Wilzig	(Canada) 6th Gear Racing
2012	L1	(United States) Tristan Nunez	(United States) Jon Brownson	(United States) Performance Tech
2012	L2	(United States) Scott Tucker	(United States) Alan Wilzig	(United States) Level 5 Motorsports
2013	L1	(United States) Sean Rayhall	(United States) Jon Brownson	(United States) Performance Tech
2013	L2	(United States) Brian Alder	(United States) Jerome Mee	(United States) Ansa Motorsports
2014	L1	(Russia) Mikhail Goikhberg	(United States) John Falb	(United States) JDC Motorsports
2014	L2	(United States) Brian Alder	(United States) Jerome Mee	(United States) BAR1 Motorsports
2015	L1	(United States) Kenton Koch	(United States) John Falb	(United States) JDC Motorsports
2015	L2	(United States) Brian Alder	n/a	(United States) BAR1 Motorsports
2016	L1	(United States) Clark Toppe	(United States) Joel Janco	(United States) JDC Motorsports
2017	LMP3	(United States) Colin Thompson	(United States) Naj Husain	(United States) P1 Motorsports
2017	MPC	(United States) Kyle Masson	(United Kingdom) Stuart Rettie	(United States) Performance Tech Motorsports
2018	LMP3	(United States) Kris Wright	(Canada) Cameron Cassels	(United States) #30 Extreme Speed Motorsports
2018	MPC	(United States) Jon Brownson	n/a	(United States) #34 Eurosport Racing
2019	LMP3	(United States) Austin McCusker (Peru) Rodrigo Pflucker	(United States) Joel Janco	(United States) #47 Forty 7 Racing
2020	LMP3	(United Kingdom) Matthew Bell (United States) Naveen Rao	(United States) Steven Thomas	(United States) #64 K2R Motorsports LLC
2021	LMP3-1	(United States) Dakota Dickerson (United States) Josh Sarchet	(United States) David Grant (United States) Keith Grant	(United States) MLT Motorsports
2021	LMP3-2	(Canada) Danny Kok (Canada) George Staikos	(Canada) Danny Kok (Canada) George Staikos	(Canada) Conquest Racing
2022	LMP3	(Estonia) Tõnis Kasemets	n/a	(United States) Wulver Racing

== Circuits ==
- (Alabama) Barber Motorsports Park (2017–2018)
- (Ontario) Canadian Tire Motorsport Park (2007–2019, 2022)
- (Texas) Circuit of the Americas (2013)
- (Quebec) Circuit Trois-Rivières (2016–2017)
- (Florida) Daytona International Speedway (2018–2021)
- Kansas Speedway (2014)
- (California) Laguna Seca (2007–2008, 2010–2013, 2016)
- (Connecticut) Lime Rock Park (2006–2011, 2017, 2003–2015)
- Mid-Ohio Sports Car Course (2006, 2011, 2013, 2019–2022)
- New Jersey Motorsports Park (2009–2010)
- (Louisiana) NOLA Motorsports Park (2015)
- (Wisconsin) Road America (2006, 2009–2015, 2020)
- Road Atlanta (2006–2022)
- (Florida) Sebring International Raceway (2007–2021)
- Utah Motorsports Campus (2007–2010, 2012)
- Virginia International Raceway (2012, 2014–2015, 2018–2022)
- (New York (state)) Watkins Glen International (2014–2017, 2021)
