= Garnet Patterson =

Australian racing driver (born 1993)

- Patterson in 2022
- Nationality: (Australia) Australian
- Born: 28 January 1993 (age 33) Werris Creek, Australia
- Categorisation: FIA Silver

Championship titles
- 2014 2013: Australian Drivers' Championship – National; New South Wales Formula Race Car

Garnet Patterson (born 17 August 1993) is an Australian racing driver who last competed in the LMGT3 class of the European Le Mans Series for United Autosports.

== Career ==
Born in Werris Creek, Patterson began racing in 2011, initially competing in the New South Wales Formula Race Car Championship, which he won in 2013 after scoring 11 wins out of the 15 races he contested. Patterson then moved to the Australian Drivers' Championship the following year, winning the national class title with ten wins to his name.

In 2015, Patterson joined KCMG to race in the Asian Formula Renault Series, finishing on the podium in all but one race he started en route to runner-up honors at the end of the year despite missing the season finale at Shanghai. The following year, Patterson raced for Nexus Infinity in the Asian Le Mans Sprint Cup and the Sepang 12 Hours, most notably finishing third in the LMP3 standings of the former series. Remaining in LMP3 competition for 2017, Patterson joined Eurasia Motorsport to compete in the FRD LMP3 Series, in which he scored a lone win at Zhejiang and ended the year sixth in points. Patterson then raced in the China Endurance Championship in 2018, before making a one-off appearance in the 2019 New South Wales Formula Race Car Championship for his own team.

In early 2020, Patterson joined ARC Bratislava to race at the 4 Hours of The Bend, finishing third in the LMP2 Am class in his only outing in the 2019–20 Asian Le Mans Series. After not racing for the rest of the year, Patterson joined Mühlner Motorsport to race in the fourth and fifth rounds of the Le Mans Cup's LMP3 class. Remaining in the series for 2022, Patterson joined United Autosports to race in the LMP3 class alongside Andres Latorre. In their only season together, the pair scored a lone podium by finishing third at Imola as they ended the year 15th in points. At the end of the year, Patterson participated in the FIA World Endurance Championship rookie tests in Bahrain, driving an Oreca 07 for United Autosports.

Patterson began 2023 racing for United Autosports in the LMP2 class of the Asian Le Mans Series, in which he scored a lone podium in race one at Yas Marina by finishing second as he closed out the winter seventh in points. Following that, Patterson joined EMA Motorsport for a dual campaign in GT World Challenge Australia and Porsche Carrera Cup Australia. Racing in all but one round in the former, Patterson scored overall wins at Wanneroo and Sydney to secure fourth in the GT3 Pro-Am standings, whereas in the latter, Patterson raced in select rounds, taking a best result of sixth at Sandown to end the year 18th in the Pro standings. During 2023, Patterson also made one-off appearances in the European Le Mans Series' LMP2 and Le Mans Cup's LMP3 classes for United Autosports.

After partaking in time attack events in 2024, Patterson reunited with United Autosports to race in the LMGT3 class of the European Le Mans Series, as well as racing in the 24 Hours of Daytona in the LMP2 class for the same team. In his first season in the European Le Mans series, Patterson scored a lone podium at the season-ending race in Algarve by finishing second, en route to a 14th-place points finish. During 2025, Patterson also made a one-off appearance in the Touring Car Masters for Duggan Family Racing. At the end of the year, he remained with United Autosports to race in the GT class of the 2025–26 Asian Le Mans Series, scoring a best result of 13th in race one at Sepang before leaving the series ahead of the UAE rounds.

Patterson will continue with United Autosports for his sophomore year in the LMGT3 class of the European Le Mans Series in 2026, as well as racing in the Bathurst 12 Hour for Optimum Motorsport. On his ELMS return, Patterson scored his second series podium at Barcelona to help him end the year 15th in LMGT3. During 2026, Patterson also won the Silverstone 500 alongside Yasser Shahin in a one-off outing in British GT for Optimum, and also competed at the 24 Hours of Spa for 2 Seas Motorsport.

== Racing record ==
=== Racing career summary ===
Season	Series	Team	Races	Wins	Poles	F/Laps	Podiums	Points	Position
2012	New South Wales Formula Race Car Championship	Garnet Patterson Racing	11	1	0	1	2	136	9th
2013	New South Wales Formula Race Car Championship	Garnet Patterson Racing	15	11	4	10	12	335	**1st**
2014	Australian Drivers' Championship – National	Garnet Patterson Racing	20	10	4	11	18	245	**1st**
2015	Asian Formula Renault Series – Class A	KCMG	10	0	0	0	9	223	**2nd**
2016	Asian Le Mans Sprint Cup – LMP3	Nexus Infinity	5	0	0	0	3	73	**3rd**
2016	Sepang 12 Hours – GT3 Pro-Am	Nexus Infinity	1	0	0	0	1	—N/a	**3rd**
2017	FRD LMP3 Series	Eurasia Motorsport	8	1	0	0	4	77	6th
2018	China Endurance Championship	Eurasia Motorsport	7	0	0	0	2		
2019	New South Wales Formula Race Car Championship	Garnet Patterson Racing	3	3	1	3	3	75	10th
2019–20	Asian Le Mans Series – LMP2 Am	ARC Bratislava	1	0	0	0	1	15	8th
2021	Le Mans Cup – LMP3	Mühlner Motorsport	3	0	0	0	0	6	23rd
2022	Le Mans Cup – LMP3	United Autosports	7	0	0	0	1	15	15th
2023	Asian Le Mans Series – LMP2	United Autosports	4	0	0	0	1	38	7th
2023	European Le Mans Series – LMP2	United Autosports	1	0	0	0	0	0	NC†
2023	Le Mans Cup – LMP3	United Autosports	1	0	1	0	0	1	32nd
2023	GT World Challenge Australia – GT3 Pro-Am	EMA Motorsport	10	2	0	0	6	158	4th
2023	Porsche Carrera Cup Australia – Pro	EMA Motorsport	11	0	0	0	0	232	18th
2025	IMSA SportsCar Championship – LMP2	United Autosports USA	1	0	0	0	0	230	57th
2025	European Le Mans Series – LMGT3	United Autosports	6	0	0	1	1	19	14th
2025	Touring Car Masters	Duggan Family Racing	3	0	0	0	0	0	NC
2025–26	Asian Le Mans Series – GT	United Autosports	2	0	0	0	0	0	33rd
2026	Bathurst 12 Hour	Optimum Motorsport	1	0	0	0	0	—N/a	DNF
2026	European Le Mans Series – LMGT3	United Autosports	6	0	0	1	1	22	15th
2026	Le Mans Cup – GT3	United Autosports	1	0	0	0	0	0	NC†
2026	British GT Championship – GT3 Silver-Am	Optimum Motorsport	1	1	0	0	1	0	NC†
2026	GT World Challenge Australia – Pro-Am	Team BRM							
2026	GT World Challenge Europe Endurance Cup	2 Seas Motorsport	1	0	0	0	0	0	NC
2026	GT World Challenge Europe Endurance Cup – Bronze	2 Seas Motorsport	1	0	0	0	0	16	23rd
2026	Intercontinental GT Challenge	2 Seas Motorsport	1	0	0	0	0	0	NC

^{†} As Patterson was a guest driver, he was ineligible to score points.

=== Complete Asian Le Mans Series results ===
(key) (Races in bold indicate pole position) (Races in italics indicate fastest lap)

Year	Team	Class	Car	Engine	1	2	3	4	5	6	Pos.	Points
2019–20	ARC Bratislava	LMP2 Am	Ligier JS P2	Nissan VK45DE 4.5 L V8	SHA	BEN; 3	SEP	BUR			8th	15
2023	United Autosports	LMP2	Oreca 07	Gibson GK428 4.2 L V8	DUB; 1; 6	DUB; 2; 8	ABU; 1; 2	ABU; 2; 6			7th	38
2025–26	United Autosports	GT	McLaren 720S GT3 Evo	McLaren M840T 4.0 L Turbo V8	SEP; 1; 13	SEP; 2; 16	DUB; 1	DUB; 2	ABU; 1	ABU; 2	33rd	0

=== Complete Le Mans Cup results ===
(key) (Races in bold indicate pole position; results in italics indicate fastest lap)

Year	Entrant	Class	Chassis	1	2	3	4	5	6	7	Rank	Points
2021	Mühlner Motorsport	LMP3	Duqueine M30 - D08	BAR	LEC	MNZ	LMS; 5	LMS; 9	SPA; 23	POR	23rd	6
2022	United Autosports	LMP3	Ligier JS P320	LEC; 16	IMO; 3	LMS; 1 Ret	LMS; 2; 17	MNZ; Ret	SPA; 25	ALG; 14	15th	15
2023	United Autosports	LMP3	Ligier JS P320	CAT	LMS; 1	LMS; 2	LEC	**ARA**; 11	SPA	ALG	32nd	1

=== Complete European Le Mans Series results ===
(key) (Races in bold indicate pole position; results in italics indicate fastest lap)

Year	Entrant	Class	Chassis	Engine	1	2	3	4	5	6	Rank	Points
2023	United Autosports USA	LMP2	Oreca 07	Gibson GK428 4.2 L V8	CAT	LEC	ARA; 7†	SPA	ALG	POR	NC†	0†
2025	United Autosports	LMGT3	McLaren 720S GT3 Evo	McLaren M840T 4.0 L Turbo V8	CAT; 11	LEC; 11	IMO; 10	SPA; Ret	SIL; Ret	ALG; 2	14th	19
2026	United Autosports	LMGT3	McLaren 720S GT3 Evo	McLaren M840T 4.0 L Turbo V8	CAT; 2	LEC; Ret	IMO; Ret	SPA; 10	SIL; 9	ALG; 10	15th	22

^{†} Car was initially a Pro-Am entry, therefore was ineligible for points.

=== Complete IMSA SportsCar Championship results ===
Year	Entrant	Class	Chassis	Engine	1	2	3	4	5	6	7	Rank	Points
2025	United Autosports USA	LMP2	Oreca 07	Gibson GK428 4.2 L V8	DAY; 11	SEB	WGL	MOS	ELK	IMS	PET	57th	230

=== Complete GT World Challenge Europe results ===
==== GT World Challenge Europe Endurance Cup ====
(key) (Races in bold indicate pole position) (Races in italics indicate fastest lap)

Year	Team	Car	Class	1	2	3	4	5	6	7	Pos.	Points
2026	2 Seas Motorsport	Mercedes-AMG GT3 Evo	Bronze	LEC	MNZ	SPA; 6H; 38	SPA; 12H; 20	SPA; 24H; 27	NÜR	ALG	23rd	16
