= 2017 4 Hours of Red Bull Ring =

Layout of the Red Bull Ring

The 2017 4 Hours of Red Bull Ring was an endurance motor race held at the Red Bull Ring in Spielberg, Austria on 22–23 July 2017. It was the third round of the 2017 European Le Mans Series.

== Race ==
=== Race result ===
Class winners in bold.

Pos	Class	No.	Team	Drivers	Chassis	Tyre	Laps
Pos	Class	No.	Team	Drivers	Engine	Tyre	Laps
1	**LMP2**	**32**	**(United States) United Autosports**	**(Portugal) Filipe Albuquerque** **(United States) William Owen** **(Switzerland) Hugo de Sadeleer**	**Ligier JS P217**	D	**169**
1	**LMP2**	**32**	**(United States) United Autosports**	**(Portugal) Filipe Albuquerque** **(United States) William Owen** **(Switzerland) Hugo de Sadeleer**	**Gibson GK428 4.2 L V8**	D	**169**
2	LMP2	22	(Russia) G-Drive Racing	(Mexico) Memo Rojas (France) Léo Roussel (France) Nicolas Minassian	Oreca 07	D	169
2	LMP2	22	(Russia) G-Drive Racing	(Mexico) Memo Rojas (France) Léo Roussel (France) Nicolas Minassian	Gibson GK428 4.2 L V8	D	169
3	LMP2	39	(France) Graff	(France) Enzo Guibbert (France) Paul Petit (France) Eric Trouillet	Oreca 07	D	168
3	LMP2	39	(France) Graff	(France) Enzo Guibbert (France) Paul Petit (France) Eric Trouillet	Gibson GK428 4.2 L V8	D	168
4	LMP2	40	(France) Graff	(Australia) James Allen (United Kingdom) Richard Bradley (Colombia) Gustavo Yacamán	Oreca 07	D	168
4	LMP2	40	(France) Graff	(Australia) James Allen (United Kingdom) Richard Bradley (Colombia) Gustavo Yacamán	Gibson GK428 4.2 L V8	D	168
5	LMP2	23	(France) Panis Barthez Competition	(France) Fabien Barthez (France) Timothé Buret (France) Nathanaël Berthon	Ligier JS P217	MI	167
5	LMP2	23	(France) Panis Barthez Competition	(France) Fabien Barthez (France) Timothé Buret (France) Nathanaël Berthon	Gibson GK428 4.2 L V8	MI	167
6	LMP2	27	(Russia) SMP Racing	(Russia) Matevos Isaakyan (Russia) Matevos Isaakyan	Dallara P217	D	167
6	LMP2	27	(Russia) SMP Racing	(Russia) Matevos Isaakyan (Russia) Matevos Isaakyan	Gibson GK428 4.2 L V8	D	167
7	LMP2	29	(Netherlands) Racing Team Nederland	(Netherlands) Frits van Eerd (Netherlands) Jan Lammers	Dallara P217	D	165
7	LMP2	29	(Netherlands) Racing Team Nederland	(Netherlands) Frits van Eerd (Netherlands) Jan Lammers	Gibson GK428 4.2 L V8	D	165
8	LMP2	49	(Denmark) High Class Racing	(Denmark) Dennis Andersen (Denmark) Anders Fjordbach	Dallara P217	D	159
8	LMP2	49	(Denmark) High Class Racing	(Denmark) Dennis Andersen (Denmark) Anders Fjordbach	Gibson GK428 4.2 L V8	D	159
9	**LMP3**	**11**	**(United States) Eurointernational**	**(Italy) Giorgio Mondini** **(Italy) Davide Uboldi**	**Ligier JS P3**	MI	**157**
9	**LMP3**	**11**	**(United States) Eurointernational**	**(Italy) Giorgio Mondini** **(Italy) Davide Uboldi**	**Nissan VK50 5.0 L V8**	MI	**157**
10	LMP3	2	(United States) United Autosports	(United States) John Falb (United States) Sean Rayhall	Ligier JS P3	MI	157
10	LMP3	2	(United States) United Autosports	(United States) John Falb (United States) Sean Rayhall	Nissan VK50 5.0 L V8	MI	157
11	LMP3	18	(France) M.Racing - YMR	(France) Alexandre Cougnaud (France) Antoine Jung (France) Romano Ricci	Ligier JS P3	MI	157
11	LMP3	18	(France) M.Racing - YMR	(France) Alexandre Cougnaud (France) Antoine Jung (France) Romano Ricci	Nissan VK50 5.0 L V8	MI	157
12	LMP3	17	(France) Ultimate	(France) François Hériau (France) Jean-Baptiste Lahaye (France) Matthieu Lahaye	Ligier JS P3	MI	157
12	LMP3	17	(France) Ultimate	(France) François Hériau (France) Jean-Baptiste Lahaye (France) Matthieu Lahaye	Nissan VK50 5.0 L V8	MI	157
13	LMP3	13	(Poland) Inter Europol Competition	(Germany) Martin Hippe (Poland) Jakub Śmiechowski	Ligier JS P3	MI	156
13	LMP3	13	(Poland) Inter Europol Competition	(Germany) Martin Hippe (Poland) Jakub Śmiechowski	Nissan VK50 5.0 L V8	MI	156
14	LMP3	9	(Austria) AT Racing	(Belarus) Alexander Talkanitsa, Jr. (Belarus) Alexander Talkanitsa, Sr. (Denmark) Mikkel Jensen	Ligier JS P3	MI	155
14	LMP3	9	(Austria) AT Racing	(Belarus) Alexander Talkanitsa, Jr. (Belarus) Alexander Talkanitsa, Sr. (Denmark) Mikkel Jensen	Nissan VK50 5.0 L V8	MI	155
15	**GTE**	**55**	**(Switzerland) Spirit of Race**	**(United Kingdom) Duncan Cameron** **(Republic of Ireland) Matt Griffin** **(United Kingdom) Aaron Scott**	**Ferrari 488 GTE**	D	**155**
15	**GTE**	**55**	**(Switzerland) Spirit of Race**	**(United Kingdom) Duncan Cameron** **(Republic of Ireland) Matt Griffin** **(United Kingdom) Aaron Scott**	**Ferrari F154CB 3.9 L Turbo V8**	D	**155**
16	LMP3	10	(Italy) Oregon Team	(Italy) Dario Capitanio (Colombia) Andrés Méndez (Italy) Davide Roda	Norma M30	MI	155
16	LMP3	10	(Italy) Oregon Team	(Italy) Dario Capitanio (Colombia) Andrés Méndez (Italy) Davide Roda	Nissan VK50 5.0 L V8	MI	155
17	GTE	66	(United Kingdom) JMW Motorsport	(United Kingdom) Jody Fannin (United Kingdom) Robert Smith (United Kingdom) Jonny Cocker	Ferrari 458 Italia GT2	D	155
17	GTE	66	(United Kingdom) JMW Motorsport	(United Kingdom) Jody Fannin (United Kingdom) Robert Smith (United Kingdom) Jonny Cocker	Ferrari 4.5 L V8	D	155
18	GTE	90	(United Kingdom) TF Sport	(United Kingdom) Euan Hankey (Denmark) Nicki Thiim (Turkey) Salih Yoluc	Aston Martin Vantage GTE	D	155
18	GTE	90	(United Kingdom) TF Sport	(United Kingdom) Euan Hankey (Denmark) Nicki Thiim (Turkey) Salih Yoluc	Aston Martin 4.5 L V8	D	155
19	GTE	51	(Switzerland) Spirit of Race	(Italy) Andrea Bertolini (Italy) Gianluca Roda (Italy) Giorgio Roda	Ferrari 488 GTE	D	155
19	GTE	51	(Switzerland) Spirit of Race	(Italy) Andrea Bertolini (Italy) Gianluca Roda (Italy) Giorgio Roda	Ferrari F154CB 3.9 L Turbo V8	D	155
20	GTE	77	(Germany) Proton Competition	(Italy) Matteo Cairoli (Switzerland) Joël Camathias (Germany) Christian Ried	Porsche 911 RSR	D	155
20	GTE	77	(Germany) Proton Competition	(Italy) Matteo Cairoli (Switzerland) Joël Camathias (Germany) Christian Ried	Porsche 4.0 L Flat-6	D	155
21	LMP3	15	(United Kingdom) RLR MSport	(Denmark) Morten Dons (Canada) John Farano (United Kingdom) Alex Kapadia	Ligier JS P3	MI	155
21	LMP3	15	(United Kingdom) RLR MSport	(Denmark) Morten Dons (Canada) John Farano (United Kingdom) Alex Kapadia	Nissan VK50 5.0 L V8	MI	155
22	GTE	99	(United Kingdom) Beechdean AMR	(United Kingdom) Andrew Howard (United Kingdom) Ross Gunn (United Kingdom) Darren Turner	Aston Martin Vantage GTE	D	154
22	GTE	99	(United Kingdom) Beechdean AMR	(United Kingdom) Andrew Howard (United Kingdom) Ross Gunn (United Kingdom) Darren Turner	Aston Martin 4.5 L V8	D	154
23	LMP3	7	(France) Duqueine Engineering	(Switzerland) Antonin Borga (Switzerland) David Droux (France) Nicolas Schatz	Norma M30	MI	154
23	LMP3	7	(France) Duqueine Engineering	(Switzerland) Antonin Borga (Switzerland) David Droux (France) Nicolas Schatz	Nissan VK50 5.0 L V8	MI	154
24	LMP3	5	(Spain) By Speed Factory	(Germany) Jürgen Krebs (Switzerland) Tim Müller (Estonia) Tristan Viidas	Ligier JS P3	MI	153
24	LMP3	5	(Spain) By Speed Factory	(Germany) Jürgen Krebs (Switzerland) Tim Müller (Estonia) Tristan Viidas	Nissan VK50 5.0 L V8	MI	153
25	LMP3	8	(France) Duqueine Engineering	(France) Vincent Beltoise (Sweden) Douglas Lundberg (Switzerland) Lucas Légeret	Ligier JS P3	MI	152
25	LMP3	8	(France) Duqueine Engineering	(France) Vincent Beltoise (Sweden) Douglas Lundberg (Switzerland) Lucas Légeret	Nissan VK50 5.0 L V8	MI	152
26	LMP2	34	(United Kingdom) Tockwith Motorsports	(United Kingdom) Phil Hanson (United Kingdom) Nigel Moore	Ligier JS P217	D	146
26	LMP2	34	(United Kingdom) Tockwith Motorsports	(United Kingdom) Phil Hanson (United Kingdom) Nigel Moore	Gibson GK428 4.2 L V8	D	146
DNF	LMP3	4	(France) Cool Racing by GPC	(Switzerland) Iradj Alexander (Switzerland) Alexandre Coigny	Ligier JS P3	MI	150
DNF	LMP3	4	(France) Cool Racing by GPC	(Switzerland) Iradj Alexander (Switzerland) Alexandre Coigny	Nissan VK50 5.0 L V8	MI	150
DNF	LMP2	25	(Portugal) Algarve Pro Racing	(France) Julien Canal (Mexico) Memo Rojas (France) Nathanaël Berthon	Ligier JS P217	D	122
DNF	LMP2	25	(Portugal) Algarve Pro Racing	(France) Julien Canal (Mexico) Memo Rojas (France) Nathanaël Berthon	Gibson GK428 4.2 L V8	D	122
DNF	LMP2	21	(United States) DragonSpeed	(United Kingdom) Ben Hanley (Sweden) Henrik Hedman (France) Nicolas Lapierre	Oreca 07	D	120
DNF	LMP2	21	(United States) DragonSpeed	(United Kingdom) Ben Hanley (Sweden) Henrik Hedman (France) Nicolas Lapierre	Gibson GK428 4.2 L V8	D	120
DNF	LMP2	47	(Italy) Cetilar Villorba Corse	(Italy) Andrea Belicchi (Italy) Roberto Lacorte (Italy) Giorgio Sernagiotto	Dallara P217	D	120
DNF	LMP2	47	(Italy) Cetilar Villorba Corse	(Italy) Andrea Belicchi (Italy) Roberto Lacorte (Italy) Giorgio Sernagiotto	Gibson GK428 4.2 L V8	D	120
DNF	LMP3	12	(United States) Eurointernational	(Italy) Andrea Dromedari (Australia) Ricky Capo (Canada) James Dayson	Ligier JS P3	MI	44
DNF	LMP3	12	(United States) Eurointernational	(Italy) Andrea Dromedari (Australia) Ricky Capo (Canada) James Dayson	Nissan VK50 5.0 L V8	MI	44
DNF	LMP3	19	(France) M.Racing - YMR	(France) Erwin Creed (France) Yann Ehrlacher	Ligier JS P3	MI	41
DNF	LMP3	19	(France) M.Racing - YMR	(France) Erwin Creed (France) Yann Ehrlacher	Nissan VK50 5.0 L V8	MI	41
DNF	LMP3	6	(United Kingdom) 360 Racing	(United Kingdom) Ross Kaiser (United Kingdom) Anthony Wells (United Kingdom) Terrence Woodward	Ligier JS P3	MI	21
DNF	LMP3	6	(United Kingdom) 360 Racing	(United Kingdom) Ross Kaiser (United Kingdom) Anthony Wells (United Kingdom) Terrence Woodward	Nissan VK50 5.0 L V8	MI	21
DNF	LMP2	28	(France) IDEC Sport Racing	(France) Patrice Lafargue (France) Paul Lafargue (France) Olivier Pla	Ligier JS P217	MI	16
DNF	LMP2	28	(France) IDEC Sport Racing	(France) Patrice Lafargue (France) Paul Lafargue (France) Olivier Pla	Gibson GK428 4.2 L V8	MI	16
DNF	LMP3	16	(France) Panis Barthez Competition	(France) Eric Debard (France) Simon Gachet (United States) Theo Bean	Ligier JS P3	MI	14
DNF	LMP3	16	(France) Panis Barthez Competition	(France) Eric Debard (France) Simon Gachet (United States) Theo Bean	Nissan VK50 5.0 L V8	MI	14
DNF	LMP3	3	(United States) United Autosports	(United Kingdom) Christian England (United Kingdom) Wayne Boyd (United States) Mark Patterson	Ligier JS P3	MI	1
DNF	LMP3	3	(United States) United Autosports	(United Kingdom) Christian England (United Kingdom) Wayne Boyd (United States) Mark Patterson	Nissan VK50 5.0 L V8	MI	1

European Le Mans Series
Previous race: Monza	2017 season	Next race: Le Castellet
