= 2019–20 Asian Le Mans Series =

Motorsport season

The 2019–20 Asian Le Mans Series was the eighth season of the Automobile Club de l'Ouest's Asian Le Mans Series. It is the fourth 24 Hours of Le Mans-based series created by the ACO, following the American Le Mans Series (since merged with the Rolex Sports Car Series to form the United SportsCar Championship), the European Le Mans Series and the FIA World Endurance Championship. The four-event season began at the Shanghai International Circuit on 24 November 2019 and ended at the Chang International Circuit in Buriram on 23 February 2020.

== Calendar ==
The calendar for the 2019–2020 season was announced on 21 February 2019.

Rnd	Race	Circuit	Location	Date
1	4 Hours of Shanghai	(China) Shanghai International Circuit	Shanghai, China	24 November 2019
2	4 Hours of The Bend	(Australia) The Bend Motorsport Park	Tailem Bend, Australia	12 January 2020
3	4 Hours of Sepang	(Malaysia) Sepang International Circuit	Selangor, Malaysia	15 February 2020
4	4 Hours of Buriram	(Thailand) Chang International Circuit	Buriram, Thailand	23 February 2020

== Entry list ==
=== LMP2 ===
Entrant/Team	Car	Engine	Class	No.	Drivers	Rounds
(Philippines) Eurasia Motorsport	Ligier JS P217	Gibson GK428 4.2 L V8	P2	1	(New Zealand) Daniel Gaunt	All
(Philippines) Eurasia Motorsport	Ligier JS P217	Gibson GK428 4.2 L V8	P2	1	(Japan) Nobuya Yamanaka	1, 4
(Philippines) Eurasia Motorsport	Ligier JS P217	Gibson GK428 4.2 L V8	P2	1	(Japan) Masataka Yanagida	1, 3
(Philippines) Eurasia Motorsport	Ligier JS P217	Gibson GK428 4.2 L V8	P2	1	(New Zealand) Nick Cassidy	2–4
(Philippines) Eurasia Motorsport	Ligier JS P217	Gibson GK428 4.2 L V8	P2	1	(New Zealand) Shane van Gisbergen	2
(Philippines) Eurasia Motorsport	Ligier JS P217	Gibson GK428 4.2 L V8	P2	36	(Australia) Nick Foster	All
(Philippines) Eurasia Motorsport	Ligier JS P217	Gibson GK428 4.2 L V8	P2	36	(Spain) Roberto Merhi	All
(Philippines) Eurasia Motorsport	Ligier JS P217	Gibson GK428 4.2 L V8	P2	36	(Australia) Aidan Read	All
(Slovakia) ARC Bratislava	Ligier JS P2	Nissan VK45DE 4.5 L V8	Am	4	(Slovakia) Miro Konôpka	1–2
(Slovakia) ARC Bratislava	Ligier JS P2	Nissan VK45DE 4.5 L V8	Am	4	(Greece) Andreas Laskaratos	1–2
(Slovakia) ARC Bratislava	Ligier JS P2	Nissan VK45DE 4.5 L V8	Am	4	(China) Kang Ling	1
(Slovakia) ARC Bratislava	Ligier JS P2	Nissan VK45DE 4.5 L V8	Am	4	(Australia) Garnet Patterson	2
(United States) Rick Ware Racing	Ligier JS P2	Nissan VK45DE 4.5 L V8	Am	25	(United States) Philippe Mulacek	2–4
(United States) Rick Ware Racing	Ligier JS P2	Nissan VK45DE 4.5 L V8	Am	25	(United States) Guy Cosmo	2–4
(United States) Rick Ware Racing	Ligier JS P2	Nissan VK45DE 4.5 L V8	Am	25	(United States) Anthony Lazzaro	2–4
(United States) Rick Ware Racing	Ligier JS P2	Nissan VK45DE 4.5 L V8	Am	52	(United States) Mark Kvamme	1
(United States) Rick Ware Racing	Ligier JS P2	Nissan VK45DE 4.5 L V8	Am	52	(United States) Cody Ware	All
(United States) Rick Ware Racing	Ligier JS P2	Nissan VK45DE 4.5 L V8	Am	52	(Lithuania) Gustas Grinbergas	2–4
(Russia) G-Drive Racing with Algarve	Aurus 01	Gibson GK428 4.2 L V8	P2	26	(United States) James French	All
(Russia) G-Drive Racing with Algarve	Aurus 01	Gibson GK428 4.2 L V8	P2	26	(Netherlands) Leonard Hoogenboom	All
(Russia) G-Drive Racing with Algarve	Aurus 01	Gibson GK428 4.2 L V8	P2	26	(Russia) Roman Rusinov	All
(Poland) Inter Europol Endurance	Ligier JS P217	Gibson GK428 4.2 L V8	P2	33	(Australia) John Corbett	All
(Poland) Inter Europol Endurance	Ligier JS P217	Gibson GK428 4.2 L V8	P2	33	(Australia) Nathan Kumar	All
(Poland) Inter Europol Endurance	Ligier JS P217	Gibson GK428 4.2 L V8	P2	33	(Australia) Mitchell Neilson	1–2
(Poland) Inter Europol Endurance	Ligier JS P217	Gibson GK428 4.2 L V8	P2	33	(Singapore) Danial Frost	3–4
(Poland) Inter Europol Endurance	Ligier JS P217	Gibson GK428 4.2 L V8	P2	34	(Switzerland) Mathias Beche	All
(Poland) Inter Europol Endurance	Ligier JS P217	Gibson GK428 4.2 L V8	P2	34	(Poland) Jakub Śmiechowski	All
(Poland) Inter Europol Endurance	Ligier JS P217	Gibson GK428 4.2 L V8	P2	34	(Australia) James Winslow	All
(United Kingdom) Thunderhead Carlin Racing	Dallara P217	Gibson GK428 4.2 L V8	P2	45	(United Kingdom) Ben Barnicoat	All
(United Kingdom) Thunderhead Carlin Racing	Dallara P217	Gibson GK428 4.2 L V8	P2	45	(United Kingdom) Jack Manchester	All
(United Kingdom) Thunderhead Carlin Racing	Dallara P217	Gibson GK428 4.2 L V8	P2	45	(United Kingdom) Harry Tincknell	All
(United Kingdom) RLR MSport	Oreca 05	Nissan VK45DE 4.5 L V8	Am	59	(Canada) John Farano	1–2
(United Kingdom) RLR MSport	Oreca 05	Nissan VK45DE 4.5 L V8	Am	59	(New Zealand) Andrew Higgins	1–2
(United Kingdom) RLR MSport	Oreca 05	Nissan VK45DE 4.5 L V8	Am	59	(India) Arjun Maini	1–2
(Japan) K2 Uchino Racing	Oreca 07	Gibson GK428 4.2 L V8	P2	96	(Japan) Haruki Kurosawa	1, 3–4
(Japan) K2 Uchino Racing	Oreca 07	Gibson GK428 4.2 L V8	P2	96	(Hong Kong) Shaun Thong	1, 3–4

Notes:British Driver James Winslow Competed under an Australian License

Icon	Class
P2	LMP2
Am	LMP2 Am

=== LMP3 ===
Entrant/Team	Car	Engine	No.	Drivers	Rounds
(United Kingdom) Nielsen Racing	Norma M30	Nissan VK50VE 5.0 L V8	2	(United Kingdom) Colin Noble	All
(United Kingdom) Nielsen Racing	Norma M30	Nissan VK50VE 5.0 L V8	2	(United Kingdom) Tony Wells	All
(United Kingdom) Nielsen Racing	Norma M30	Nissan VK50VE 5.0 L V8	3	(United States) Charles Crews	All
(United Kingdom) Nielsen Racing	Norma M30	Nissan VK50VE 5.0 L V8	3	(Canada) Garett Grist	All
(United Kingdom) Nielsen Racing	Norma M30	Nissan VK50VE 5.0 L V8	3	(United States) Rob Hodes	All
(France) Graff Racing	Norma M30	Nissan VK50VE 5.0 L V8	8	(Liechtenstein) Matthias Kaiser	3–4
(France) Graff Racing	Norma M30	Nissan VK50VE 5.0 L V8	8	(Finland) Rory Penttinen	3
(France) Graff Racing	Norma M30	Nissan VK50VE 5.0 L V8	8	(Australia) Neale Muston	4
(France) Graff Racing	Norma M30	Nissan VK50VE 5.0 L V8	9	(Switzerland) David Droux	All
(France) Graff Racing	Norma M30	Nissan VK50VE 5.0 L V8	9	(France) Eric Trouillet	All
(France) Graff Racing	Norma M30	Nissan VK50VE 5.0 L V8	9	(Switzerland) Sébastien Page	1, 3–4
(France) Graff Racing	Norma M30	Nissan VK50VE 5.0 L V8	9	(Australia) Ricky Capo	2
(Italy) ACE1 Villorba Corse	Ligier JS P3	Nissan VK50VE 5.0 L V8	12	(Italy) Alessandro Bressan	All
(Italy) ACE1 Villorba Corse	Ligier JS P3	Nissan VK50VE 5.0 L V8	12	(Italy) Gabriele Lancieri	All
(Italy) ACE1 Villorba Corse	Ligier JS P3	Nissan VK50VE 5.0 L V8	12	(Japan) Yuki Harata	1
(Italy) ACE1 Villorba Corse	Ligier JS P3	Nissan VK50VE 5.0 L V8	12	(Italy) David Fumanelli	2–4
(Poland) Inter Europol Competition	Ligier JS P3	Nissan VK50VE 5.0 L V8	13	(Germany) Martin Hippe	All
(Poland) Inter Europol Competition	Ligier JS P3	Nissan VK50VE 5.0 L V8	13	(United Kingdom) Nigel Moore	All
(Poland) Inter Europol Competition	Ligier JS P3	Nissan VK50VE 5.0 L V8	14	(Australia) Peter Paddon	2
(Poland) Inter Europol Competition	Ligier JS P3	Nissan VK50VE 5.0 L V8	14	(Australia) Garth Walden	2
(Poland) Inter Europol Competition	Ligier JS P3	Nissan VK50VE 5.0 L V8	14	(United States) Austin McCusker	2
(Poland) Inter Europol Competition	Ligier JS P3	Nissan VK50VE 5.0 L V8	18	(Hong Kong) Philip Kadoorie	3–4
(Poland) Inter Europol Competition	Ligier JS P3	Nissan VK50VE 5.0 L V8	18	(United Kingdom) Dan Wells	3–4
(Malaysia) Viper Niza Racing	Ligier JS P3	Nissan VK50VE 5.0 L V8	65	(Malaysia) Dominc Ang	All
(Malaysia) Viper Niza Racing	Ligier JS P3	Nissan VK50VE 5.0 L V8	65	(Malaysia) Douglas Khoo	All

=== GT ===
Entrant/Team	Car	Engine	Class	No.	Drivers	Rounds
(Japan) Car Guy Racing	Ferrari 488 GT3	Ferrari F154CB 3.9 L Turbo V8	GT	7	(Italy) Kei Cozzolino	1–3
(Japan) Car Guy Racing	Ferrari 488 GT3	Ferrari F154CB 3.9 L Turbo V8	GT	7	(Japan) Takeshi Kimura	All
(Japan) Car Guy Racing	Ferrari 488 GT3	Ferrari F154CB 3.9 L Turbo V8	GT	7	(Italy) Antonio Fuoco	1
(Japan) Car Guy Racing	Ferrari 488 GT3	Ferrari F154CB 3.9 L Turbo V8	GT	7	(France) Côme Ledogar	2–4
(Japan) Car Guy Racing	Ferrari 488 GT3	Ferrari F154CB 3.9 L Turbo V8	GT	7	(Denmark) Mikkel Jensen	4
(China) Astro Veloce Motorsport	BMW M6 GT3	BMW S63 4.4 L V8	Am	16	(China) Michael Lu	1–2
(China) Astro Veloce Motorsport	BMW M6 GT3	BMW S63 4.4 L V8	Am	16	(China) David Weian Chen	2
(China) Astro Veloce Motorsport	BMW M6 GT3	BMW S63 4.4 L V8	Am	16	(China) Li Lin	1
(China) Astro Veloce Motorsport	BMW M6 GT3	BMW S63 4.4 L V8	Am	16	(China) Dennis Zhang	2
(China) Astro Veloce Motorsport	BMW M6 GT3	BMW S63 4.4 L V8	GT	17	(Germany) Jens Klingmann	1–2
(China) Astro Veloce Motorsport	BMW M6 GT3	BMW S63 4.4 L V8	GT	17	(China) Aven Qi	1–2
(China) Astro Veloce Motorsport	BMW M6 GT3	BMW S63 4.4 L V8	GT	17	(Italy) Max Wiser	1–2
(Chinese Taipei) HubAuto Corsa	Ferrari 488 GT3 1 Ferrari 488 GT3 Evo 2020 2	Ferrari F154CB 3.9 L Turbo V8	GT	27	(Chinese Taipei) Morris Chen	1
(Chinese Taipei) HubAuto Corsa	Ferrari 488 GT3 1 Ferrari 488 GT3 Evo 2020 2	Ferrari F154CB 3.9 L Turbo V8	GT	27	(Brazil) Marcos Gomes	All
(Chinese Taipei) HubAuto Corsa	Ferrari 488 GT3 1 Ferrari 488 GT3 Evo 2020 2	Ferrari F154CB 3.9 L Turbo V8	GT	27	(Italy) Davide Rigon	1–3
(Chinese Taipei) HubAuto Corsa	Ferrari 488 GT3 1 Ferrari 488 GT3 Evo 2020 2	Ferrari F154CB 3.9 L Turbo V8	GT	27	(Australia) Liam Talbot	2–4
(Chinese Taipei) HubAuto Corsa	Ferrari 488 GT3 1 Ferrari 488 GT3 Evo 2020 2	Ferrari F154CB 3.9 L Turbo V8	GT	27	(Australia) Tim Slade	4
(Switzerland) Spirit of Race	Ferrari 488 GT3	Ferrari F154CB 3.9 L Turbo V8	GT	51	(Brazil) Oswaldo Negri Jr.	All
(Switzerland) Spirit of Race	Ferrari 488 GT3	Ferrari F154CB 3.9 L Turbo V8	GT	51	(Italy) Alessandro Pier Guidi	1–3
(Switzerland) Spirit of Race	Ferrari 488 GT3	Ferrari F154CB 3.9 L Turbo V8	GT	51	(Puerto Rico) Francesco Piovanetti	All
(Switzerland) Spirit of Race	Ferrari 488 GT3	Ferrari F154CB 3.9 L Turbo V8	GT	51	(Brazil) Daniel Serra	4
(Singapore) T2 Motorsports	Ferrari 488 GT3	Ferrari F154CB 3.9 L Turbo V8	GT	75	(Italy) Christian Colombo	All
(Singapore) T2 Motorsports	Ferrari 488 GT3	Ferrari F154CB 3.9 L Turbo V8	GT	75	(Indonesia) Rio Haryanto	All
(Singapore) T2 Motorsports	Ferrari 488 GT3	Ferrari F154CB 3.9 L Turbo V8	GT	75	(Indonesia) David Tjiptobiantoro	All
(Japan) D'station Racing AMR	Aston Martin Vantage AMR GT3	Aston Martin M177 4.0 L Turbo V8	GT	77	(Japan) Tomonobu Fujii	All
(Japan) D'station Racing AMR	Aston Martin Vantage AMR GT3	Aston Martin M177 4.0 L Turbo V8	GT	77	(United Kingdom) Ross Gunn	1–3
(Japan) D'station Racing AMR	Aston Martin Vantage AMR GT3	Aston Martin M177 4.0 L Turbo V8	GT	77	(Japan) Satoshi Hoshino	All
(Japan) D'station Racing AMR	Aston Martin Vantage AMR GT3	Aston Martin M177 4.0 L Turbo V8	GT	77	(United Kingdom) Tom Gamble	4
(Japan) Team JLOC	Lamborghini Huracán GT3 Evo	Lamborghini DGF 5.2 L V10	GT	88	(Macau) André Couto	1–2
(Japan) Team JLOC	Lamborghini Huracán GT3 Evo	Lamborghini DGF 5.2 L V10	GT	88	(Japan) Yuya Motojima	All
(Japan) Team JLOC	Lamborghini Huracán GT3 Evo	Lamborghini DGF 5.2 L V10	GT	88	(Japan) Yusaku Shibata	All
(Japan) Team JLOC	Lamborghini Huracán GT3 Evo	Lamborghini DGF 5.2 L V10	GT	88	(Japan) Takashi Kogure	3–4
(Chinese Taipei) FIST-Team AAI	BMW M6 GT3	BMW S63 4.4 L V8	GT	90	(Chinese Taipei) Jun-San Chen	1
(Chinese Taipei) FIST-Team AAI	BMW M6 GT3	BMW S63 4.4 L V8	GT	90	(Sweden) Joel Eriksson	1
(Chinese Taipei) FIST-Team AAI	BMW M6 GT3	BMW S63 4.4 L V8	GT	90	(China) Ye Hongli	1

Icon	Class
GT	GT3
Am	GT3 Am

== Results ==
Bold indicates overall winner.

Rnd.	Circuit	LMP2 Winning Team	LMP2 Am Winning Team	LMP3 Winning Team	GT Winning Team	GT Am Winning Team	Results
Rnd.	Circuit	LMP2 Winning Drivers	LMP2 Am Winning Drivers	LMP3 Winning Drivers	GT Winning Drivers	GT Am Winning Drivers	Results
1	(China) Shanghai	(Russia) **No. 26 G-Drive Racing with Algarve**	(United Kingdom) No. 59 RLR MSport	(Poland) No. 13 Inter Europol Competition	(Japan) No. 77 D'station Racing AMR	No Finishers	Report
1	(China) Shanghai	**(United States) James French** **(Netherlands) Leonard Hoogenboom** **(Russia) Roman Rusinov**	(Canada) John Farano (New Zealand) Andrew Higgins (India) Arjun Maini	(Germany) Martin Hippe (United Kingdom) Nigel Moore	(Japan) Tomonobu Fujii (United Kingdom) Ross Gunn (Japan) Satoshi Hoshino	No Finishers	Report
2	(Australia) The Bend	(Russia) **No. 26 G-Drive Racing with Algarve**	(United States) No. 52 Rick Ware Racing	(United Kingdom) No. 2 Nielsen Racing	(Japan) No. 7 Car Guy Racing	No Finishers	Report
2	(Australia) The Bend	**(United States) James French** **(Netherlands) Leonard Hoogenboom** **(Russia) Roman Rusinov**	(Lithuania) Gustas Grinbergas (United States) Cody Ware	(United Kingdom) Colin Noble (United Kingdom) Tony Wells	(Italy) Kei Cozzolino (Japan) Takeshi Kimura (France) Côme Ledogar	No Finishers	Report
3	(Malaysia) Sepang	**(United Kingdom) No. 45 Thunderhead Carlin Racing**	(United States) No. 52 Rick Ware Racing	(France) No. 9 Graff Racing	(Japan) No. 88 Team JLOC	No Entries	Report
3	(Malaysia) Sepang	**(United Kingdom) Ben Barnicoat** **(United Kingdom) Jack Manchester** **(United Kingdom) Harry Tincknell**	(Lithuania) Gustas Grinbergas (United States) Cody Ware	(Switzerland) David Droux (Switzerland) Sébastien Page (France) Eric Trouillet	(Japan) Takashi Kogure (Japan) Yuya Motojima (Japan) Yusaku Shibata	No Entries	Report
4	(Thailand) Buriram	**(United Kingdom) No.45 Thunderhead Carlin Racing**	(United States) No. 25 Rick Ware Racing	(Italy) No. 12 ACE1 Villorba Corse	(Chinese Taipei) No. 27 HubAuto Corsa	No Entries	Report
4	(Thailand) Buriram	**(United Kingdom) Ben Barnicoat** **(United Kingdom) Jack Manchester** **(United Kingdom) Harry Tincknell**	(United States) Philippe Mulacek (United States) Guy Cosmo (United States) Anthony Lazzaro	(Italy) Alessandro Bressan (Italy) David Fumanelli (Italy) Gabriele Lancieri	(Brazil) Marcos Gomes (Australia) Tim Slade (Australia) Liam Talbot	No Entries	Report

== Teams Championships ==
Points are awarded according to the following structure:

Position	**1st**	**2nd**	**3rd**	**4th**	**5th**	**6th**	**7th**	**8th**	**9th**	**10th**	**Other**	**Pole**
Points	25	18	15	12	10	8	6	4	2	1	0.5	1

=== LMP2 Teams Championship ===
Pos.	Team	Car	SHA (China)	BEN (Australia)	SEP (Malaysia)	CHA (Thailand)	Points
1	(Russia) #26 G-Drive Racing with Algarve	Aurus 01	1	1	3	2	83
2	(United Kingdom) #45 Thunderhead Carlin Racing	Dallara P217	3	**3**	1	**1**	82
3	(Philippines) #36 Eurasia Motorsport	Ligier JS P217	**2**	2	2	5	65
4	(Poland) #33 Inter Europol Endurance	Ligier JS P217	5	4	6	6	38
5	(Poland) #34 Inter Europol Endurance	Ligier JS P217	4	Ret	5	7	28
6	(Japan) #96 K2 Uchino Racing	Oreca 07	Ret	WD	4	3	27
7	(Philippines) #1 Eurasia Motorsport	Ligier JS P217	Ret	Ret	**Ret**	4	13

Key
Colour	Result
Gold	Race winner
Silver	2nd place
Bronze	3rd place
Green	Points finish
Blue	Non-points finish
Blue	Non-classified finish (NC)
Purple	Did not finish (Ret)
Black	Disqualified (DSQ)
Black	Excluded (EX)
White	Did not start (DNS)
White	Race cancelled (C)
White	Withdrew (WD)
Blank	Did not participate

**Bold** – Pole

=== LMP2 Am Teams Championship ===
Pos.	Team	Car	SHA (China)	BEN (Australia)	SEP (Malaysia)	CHA (Thailand)	Points
1	(United States) #52 Rick Ware Racing	Ligier JS P2	2	1	1	2	86
2	(United States) #25 Rick Ware Racing	Ligier JS P2	DNS	2	**Ret**	**1**	45
3	(United Kingdom) #59 RLR MSport	Oreca 05	1	**Ret**			26
4	(Slovakia) #4 ARC Bratislava	Ligier JS P2	**Ret**	3			16

Key
Colour	Result
Gold	Race winner
Silver	2nd place
Bronze	3rd place
Green	Points finish
Blue	Non-points finish
Blue	Non-classified finish (NC)
Purple	Did not finish (Ret)
Black	Disqualified (DSQ)
Black	Excluded (EX)
White	Did not start (DNS)
White	Race cancelled (C)
White	Withdrew (WD)
Blank	Did not participate

**Bold** – Pole

=== LMP3 Teams Championship ===
Pos.	Team	Car	SHA (China)	BEN (Australia)	SEP (Malaysia)	CHA (Thailand)	Points
1	(United Kingdom) #2 Nielsen Racing	Norma M30	2	**1**	4	**2**	75
2	(Italy) #12 ACE1 Villorba Corse	Ligier JS P3	4	3	5	1	62
3	(Poland) #13 Inter Europol Competition	Ligier JS P3	1	2	**3**	Ret	59
4	(France) #9 Graff Racing	Norma M30	3	Ret	1	Ret	40
5	(United Kingdom) #3 Nielsen Racing	Norma M30	**6**	Ret	2	5	37
6	(Malaysia) #65 Viper Niza Racing	Ligier JS P3	5	Ret	8	4	26
7	(France) #8 Graff Racing	Norma M30			7	3	21
8	(Poland) #18 Inter Europol Competition	Ligier JS P3			6	6	16
9	(Poland) #14 Inter Europol Competition	Ligier JS P3		4			12

Key
Colour	Result
Gold	Race winner
Silver	2nd place
Bronze	3rd place
Green	Points finish
Blue	Non-points finish
Blue	Non-classified finish (NC)
Purple	Did not finish (Ret)
Black	Disqualified (DSQ)
Black	Excluded (EX)
White	Did not start (DNS)
White	Race cancelled (C)
White	Withdrew (WD)
Blank	Did not participate

**Bold** – Pole

=== GT Teams Championship ===
Pos.	Team	Car	SHA (China)	BEN (Australia)	SEP (Malaysia)	CHA (Thailand)	Points
1	(Chinese Taipei) #27 HubAuto Corsa	Ferrari 488 GT3	**6**	**2**	2	1	71
2	(Japan) #7 Car Guy Racing	Ferrari 488 GT3	5	1	**5**	2	64
3	(Japan) #88 Team JLOC	Lamborghini Huracán GT3 Evo	2	7	1	4	61
4	(Switzerland) #51 Spirit of Race	Ferrari 488 GT3	4	3	3	3	57
5	(Singapore) #75 T2 Motorsports	Ferrari 488 GT3	7	4	4	**5**	41
6	(Japan) #77 D'station Racing AMR	Aston Martin Vantage AMR GT3	1	6	Ret	Ret	33
7	(China) #17 Astro Veloce Motorsport	BMW M6 GT3	3	5	DNS	DNS	25
8	(China) #16 Astro Veloce Motorsport	BMW M6 GT3	DNS	Ret	DNS	DNS	0
9	(Chinese Taipei) #90 FIST-Team AAI	BMW M6 GT3	Ret		DNS	DNS	0

Key
Colour	Result
Gold	Race winner
Silver	2nd place
Bronze	3rd place
Green	Points finish
Blue	Non-points finish
Blue	Non-classified finish (NC)
Purple	Did not finish (Ret)
Black	Disqualified (DSQ)
Black	Excluded (EX)
White	Did not start (DNS)
White	Race cancelled (C)
White	Withdrew (WD)
Blank	Did not participate

**Bold** – Pole

=== GT Am Teams Championship ===
Pos.	Team	Car	SHA (China)	BEN (Australia)	SEP (Malaysia)	CHA (Thailand)	Points
1	(China) #16 Astro Veloce Motorsports	BMW M6 GT3	**DNS**	**Ret**			2

Key
Colour	Result
Gold	Race winner
Silver	2nd place
Bronze	3rd place
Green	Points finish
Blue	Non-points finish
Blue	Non-classified finish (NC)
Purple	Did not finish (Ret)
Black	Disqualified (DSQ)
Black	Excluded (EX)
White	Did not start (DNS)
White	Race cancelled (C)
White	Withdrew (WD)
Blank	Did not participate

**Bold** – Pole

== Drivers Championships ==
Points are awarded according to the following structure:

Position	**1st**	**2nd**	**3rd**	**4th**	**5th**	**6th**	**7th**	**8th**	**9th**	**10th**	**Other**	**Pole**
Points	25	18	15	12	10	8	6	4	2	1	0.5	1

=== LMP2 Drivers Championship ===
Pos.	Driver	SHA (China)	BEN (Australia)	SEP (Malaysia)	CHA (Thailand)	Points
1	(United States) James French	1	1	3	2	83
1	(Netherlands) Leonard Hoogenboom	1	1	3	2	83
1	(Russia) Roman Rusinov	1	1	3	2	83
2	(United Kingdom) Ben Barnicoat	3	**3**	1	**1**	82
2	(United Kingdom) Jack Manchester	3	**3**	1	**1**	82
2	(United Kingdom) Harry Tincknell	3	**3**	1	**1**	82
3	(Australia) Aidan Read	**2**	2	2	5	65
3	(United Kingdom) Nick Foster	**2**	2	2	5	65
3	(Spain) Roberto Merhi	**2**	2	2	5	65
4	(United Kingdom) John Corbett	5	4	6	6	38
4	(Australia) Nathan Kumar	5	4	6	6	38
5	(Poland) Jakub Śmiechowski	4	Ret	5	7	28
5	(United Kingdom) James Winslow	4	Ret	5	7	28
5	(Switzerland) Mathias Beche	4	Ret	5	7	28
6	(Japan) Haruki Kurosawa	Ret	WD	4	3	27
6	(Hong Kong) Shaun Thong	Ret	WD	4	3	27
7	(Australia) Mitchell Neilson	5	4			22
8	(Singapore) Danial Frost			6	6	16
9	(New Zealand) Daniel Gaunt	Ret	Ret	**Ret**	4	13
9	(New Zealand) Nick Cassidy		Ret	Ret	4	13
10	(Japan) Nobuya Yamanaka	Ret			4	12
11	(Japan) Masataka Yanagida	Ret		**Ret**		1
12	(New Zealand) Shane van Gisbergen		Ret			0

Key
Colour	Result
Gold	Race winner
Silver	2nd place
Bronze	3rd place
Green	Points finish
Blue	Non-points finish
Blue	Non-classified finish (NC)
Purple	Did not finish (Ret)
Black	Disqualified (DSQ)
Black	Excluded (EX)
White	Did not start (DNS)
White	Race cancelled (C)
White	Withdrew (WD)
Blank	Did not participate

**Bold** – Pole

=== LMP2 Am Drivers Championship ===
Pos.	Driver	SHA (China)	BEN (Australia)	SEP (Malaysia)	CHA (Thailand)	Points
1	(United States) Cody Ware	2	1	1	2	86
2	(Lithuania) Gustas Grinbergas		1	1	2	68
3	(United States) Anthony Lazzaro		2	**Ret**	**1**	45
3	(United States) Guy Cosmo		2	**Ret**	**1**	45
4	(United States) Phillippe Mulacek	DNS	DNS	**Ret**	**1**	27
5	(New Zealand) Andrew Higgins	1	**Ret**			26
5	(India) Arjun Maini	1	**Ret**			26
5	(Canada) John Farano	1	**Ret**			26
6	(United States) Mark Kvamme	2				18
7	(Greece) Andreas Laskaratos	Ret	**3**			16
7	(Slovakia) Miro Konôpka	**Ret**	3			16
8	(Australia) Garnet Patterson		3			15
9	(China) Kang Ling	**Ret**				1
10	(United States) Michael Zimicki	DNS				0

Key
Colour	Result
Gold	Race winner
Silver	2nd place
Bronze	3rd place
Green	Points finish
Blue	Non-points finish
Blue	Non-classified finish (NC)
Purple	Did not finish (Ret)
Black	Disqualified (DSQ)
Black	Excluded (EX)
White	Did not start (DNS)
White	Race cancelled (C)
White	Withdrew (WD)
Blank	Did not participate

**Bold** – Pole

=== LMP3 Drivers Championship ===
Pos.	Driver	SHA (China)	BEN (Australia)	SEP (Malaysia)	CHA (Thailand)	Points
1	(United Kingdom) Colin Noble	2	**1**	4	**2**	75
1	(United Kingdom) Tony Wells	2	**1**	4	**2**	75
2	(Italy) Alessandro Bressan	4	3	5	1	62
3	(Germany) Martin Hippe	1	2	**3**	Ret	59
3	(United Kingdom) Nigel Moore	1	2	**3**	Ret	59
4	(Italy) David Fumanelli		3	5	1	50
5	(Switzerland) David Droux	3	Ret	1	Ret	40
5	(France) Eric Trouilllet	3	Ret	1	Ret	40
5	(Switzerland) Sebastien Page	3	Ret	1	Ret	40
6	(United States) Charles Crews	**6**	Ret	2	5	37
6	(Canada) Garett Grist	**6**	Ret	2	5	37
6	(United States) Rob Hodes	**6**	Ret	2	5	37
7	(Italy) Gabriele Lancieri	4	3			27
8	(Malaysia) Dominic Ang	5	Ret	8	4	26
8	(Malaysia) Douglas Khoo	5	Ret	8	4	26
9	(Liechtenstein) Matthias Kaiser			7	3	21
10	(Australia) Neale Muston				3	15
11	(Japan) Yuki Harata	4				12
11	(United States) Austin McCusker		4			12
11	(Australia) Garth Walden		4			12
11	(Australia) Peter Paddon		4			12
12	(United Kingdom) Dan Wells			6	Ret	8
12	(Hong Kong) Philip Kadoorie			6	Ret	8
13	(Finland) Rory Penttinen			7		6
14	(Australia) Ricky Capo		Ret			0

Key
Colour	Result
Gold	Race winner
Silver	2nd place
Bronze	3rd place
Green	Points finish
Blue	Non-points finish
Blue	Non-classified finish (NC)
Purple	Did not finish (Ret)
Black	Disqualified (DSQ)
Black	Excluded (EX)
White	Did not start (DNS)
White	Race cancelled (C)
White	Withdrew (WD)
Blank	Did not participate

**Bold** – Pole

=== GT Drivers Championship ===
Pos.	Driver	SHA (China)	BEN (Australia)	SEP (Malaysia)	CHA (Thailand)	Points
1	(Brazil) Marcos Gomes	**6**	**2**	2	1	71
2	(Japan) Takeshi Kimura	5	1	**5**	2	64
3	(Australia) Liam Talbot		**2**	2	1	62
4	(Japan) Yusaku Shibata	2	7	1	4	61
4	(Japan) Yuya Motojima	2	7	1	4	61
5	(Puerto Rico) Francesco Piovanetti	4	3	3	3	57
5	(Brazil) Oswaldo Negri Jr.	4	3	3	3	57
6	(France) Côme Ledogar		1	**5**	2	54
7	(Italy) Davide Rigon	**6**	**2**	2		46
7	(Italy) Kei Cozzolino	5	1	**5**		46
8	(Italy) Alessandro Pier Guidi	4	3	3		42
9	(Italy) Christian Colombo	7	4	4	**5**	41
9	(Indonesia) David Tjiptobiantoro	7	4	4	**5**	41
9	(Indonesia) Rio Haryanto	7	4	4	**5**	41
10	(Japan) Takashi Kogure			1	4	37
11	(United Kingdom) Ross Gunn	1	6	Ret		33
11	(Japan) Satoshi Hoshino	1	6	Ret	Ret	33
11	(Japan) Tomonobu Fujii	1	6	Ret	Ret	33
12	(Germany) Jens Klingmann	3	5			25
12	(Italy) Max Wiser	3	5			25
12	(China) Peiwen Qi	3	5			25
12	(Australia) Tim Slade				1	25
13	(Macau) André Couto	2	7			24
14	(Denmark) Mikkel Jensen				2	18
15	(Brazil) Daniel Serra				3	15
16	(Italy) Antonio Fuoco	5				10
17	(Chinese Taipei) Morris Chen	**6**				9
18	(China) Chen Weian		Ret			0
18	(China) Li Lin	DNS				0
18	(China) Zhang Yaqi		Ret			0
18	(China) Zhiwei Lu	DNS	Ret			0
18	(United Kingdom) Tom Gamble				Ret	0
18	(China) Ye Hongli	Ret				0
18	(Sweden) Joel Eriksson	Ret				0
18	(Chinese Taipei) Jun-San Chen	Ret				0

Key
Colour	Result
Gold	Race winner
Silver	2nd place
Bronze	3rd place
Green	Points finish
Blue	Non-points finish
Blue	Non-classified finish (NC)
Purple	Did not finish (Ret)
Black	Disqualified (DSQ)
Black	Excluded (EX)
White	Did not start (DNS)
White	Race cancelled (C)
White	Withdrew (WD)
Blank	Did not participate

**Bold** – Pole

=== GT Am Drivers Championship ===
Pos.	Driver	SHA (China)	BEN (Australia)	SEP (Malaysia)	CHA (Thailand)	Points
1	(China) Li Lin	**DNS**				1
1	(China) Zhiwei Lu	**DNS**				1
2	(China) Chen Weian		Ret			0
2	(China) Zhang Yaqi		Ret			0

Key
Colour	Result
Gold	Race winner
Silver	2nd place
Bronze	3rd place
Green	Points finish
Blue	Non-points finish
Blue	Non-classified finish (NC)
Purple	Did not finish (Ret)
Black	Disqualified (DSQ)
Black	Excluded (EX)
White	Did not start (DNS)
White	Race cancelled (C)
White	Withdrew (WD)
Blank	Did not participate

**Bold** – Pole
