= C. R. Crews =

American racing driver

- Nationality: (United States) American
- Born: Charles Richard Crews; May 30, 1988 (age 38) Dallas, Texas, U.S.

Indy Lights career
- Categorisation: FIA Bronze (until 2022); FIA Silver (2023–)
- Starts: 11
- Championships: 0
- Wins: 0
- Podiums: 0
- Poles: 0
- Best finish: 19th in 2006

Previous series
- 2006 2004-2005 2003: Atlantic Championship; Star Mazda Championship; Formula TR Pro

Charles Richard Crews (born May 30, 1988) is an American race car driver from Dallas, Texas.

An early graduate of a Dallas prep school, Crews competed in the Indy Racing League's development system, winning the first Formula Mazda race he entered at the age of fourteen. He then ran eleven races over three seasons for four different teams in the Indy Lights championship, most prominently with Michael Crawford Motorsports during 2007. At the time of his debut, he was the youngest driver ever to compete in what was then called the Indy Pro Series.

Crews has also competed in the 24 Hours of Daytona, the Star Mazda Championship, and in championship karting. He has competed in both domestic and international races on four continents.

Despite his relative inexperience, Crews hoped to compete in the 2007 Indianapolis 500 for SWE, but his deal with the team fell through. He was then linked to securing an entry for the 2008 Indianapolis 500. However, he was unable to complete rookie orientation due to rainy weather during the designated time period. He competed in the 2008 24 Hours of Daytona in the GT class.

== Racing record ==
=== American open-wheel racing results ===
(key) (Races in bold indicate pole position)

==== Indy Lights ====
Year	Team	1	2	3	4	5	6	7	8	9	10	11	12	13	14	15	16	Rank	Points
2006	Michael Crawford Motorsports	HMS	STP	STP	INDY	WGL; 9	IMS; 6	NSH	MIL									19th	86
2006	Guthrie Meyer Racing									KTY; 11	SNM	SNM						19th	86
2006	Dave McMillan Racing												CHI; 13					19th	86
2007	Michael Crawford Motorsports	HMS; 9	STP; 10	STP; 6	INDY	MIL	IMS	IMS	IOW	WGL; 18	WGL; 18	NSH	MOH; 15	KTY	SNM	SNM	CHI	22nd	109
2008	Michael Crawford Motorsports	HMS	STP1	STP2	KAN	INDY	MIL	IOW	WGL1	WGL2	NSH	MOH1	MOH2	KTY; 20	SNM1	SNM2	CHI	40th	10

=== 24 Hours of Daytona ===
(key)

24 Hours of Daytona results
Year	Class	No	Team	Car	Co-drivers	Laps	Position	Class Pos.
2008	GT	83	(United States) Farnbacher Loles Racing	Porsche GT3 Cup	(United States) Russell Walker (United States) Peter Ludwig (United States) Ben McCrackin (Germany) Tim Bergmeister	397	51st	32nd
2022	LMP3	26	(Belgium) Mühlner Motorsports America	Duqueine M30 - D08	(Australia) Cameron Shields (United States) Nolan Siegel (Belgium) Ugo de Wilde	681	36th	6th

=== Complete WeatherTech SportsCar Championship results ===
(key) (Races in bold indicate pole position; results in italics indicate fastest lap)

Year	Team	Class	Make	Engine	1	2	3	4	5	6	7	Pos.	Points
2022	Mühlner Motorsports America	LMP3	Duqueine M30 - D08	Nissan VK56DE 5.6 L V8	DAY; 6	SEB	MOH	WGL	MOS	ELK	PET	-*	0*

=== Complete European Le Mans Series results ===
(key) (Races in bold indicate pole position; results in italics indicate fastest lap)

Year	Entrant	Class	Chassis	Engine	1	2	3	4	5	6	Rank	Points
2020	Nielsen Racing	LMP3	Duqueine M30 – D08	Nissan VK56DE 5.6L V8	LEC; 8	SPA; Ret	LEC; 5	MNZ; 6	ALG; 5		13th	32
2021	Team Virage	LMP3	Ligier JS P320	Nissan VK56DE 5.6L V8	CAT; 7	RBR; Ret	LEC; Ret	MNZ; 5	SPA; 5	ALG	12th	26
2022	Inter Europol Competition	LMP3	Ligier JS P320	Nissan VK56DE 5.6L V8	LEC; DSQ	IMO; 8	MNZ; 1	CAT; 1	SPA; 1	ALG; Ret	2nd	79

^{*} Season still in progress.

=== Complete Asian Le Mans Series results ===
(key) (Races in bold indicate pole position) (Races in italics indicate fastest lap)

Year	Team	Class	Car	Engine	1	2	3	4	Pos.	Points
2019-20	Nielsen Racing	LMP3	Norma M30	Nissan VK50 5.0 L V8	SHA; 6	BEN; Ret	SEP; 2	BUR; 5	6th	37
2023	Inter Europol Competition	LMP2	Oreca 07	Gibson GK428 4.2 L V8	**DUB**; **1** Ret	**DUB**; **2**; 1	ABU; 1; 4	ABU; 2 NC	5th	39
