= 2020 4 Hours of The Bend =

Track map of The Bend Motorsport Park

The 2020 4 Hours of The Bend was an endurance sportscar racing event held on January 12, 2020, at The Bend Motorsport Park in Tailem Bend, Australia. It served as the second round of the 2019-20 Asian Le Mans Series season.

== Background ==
The race was announced in 16 February 2019, and included into the Asian Le Mans Series season calendar by replacing the 4 Hours of Fuji five days later. The competing classes were LMP2, LMP3 and GT, with both LMP2 and GT split to include the AM class.

The race was the first major international motor race held on The Bend's 35 turn, 7.770 km (4.828 mi) long GT Circuit, officially the second longest permanent motor racing circuit in the world behind only the 20.832 km (12.944 mi) Nürburgring Nordschleife. The race was attended by the President of the Automobile Club de l'Ouest (ACO), Pierre Fillon.

== Schedule ==
Date	Time (local: ACDT)	Event
Friday, 10 January	16:10	Free Practice 1
Saturday, 11 January	9:30	Free Practice 2
Saturday, 11 January	13:30	Qualifying
Sunday, 12 January	13:00	Race

== Free practice ==
- Only the fastest car in each class is shown.

Free Practice 1	Class	No.	Entrant	Time
Free Practice 1	LMP2	1	(Philippines) Eurasia Motorsport	2:36.496
Free Practice 1	LMP2 Am	59	(United Kingdom) RLR MSport	2:46.312
Free Practice 1	LMP3	12	(Italy) ACE1 Villorba Corse	2:52.431
Free Practice 1	GT	88	(Japan) Team JLOC	2:59.913
Free Practice 1	GT Am	—		
Free Practice 2	Class	No.	Entrant	Time
Free Practice 2	LMP2	26	(Russia) G-Drive Racing with Algarve	2:35.418
Free Practice 2	LMP2 Am	59	(United Kingdom) RLR MSport	2:43.416
Free Practice 2	LMP3	12	(Italy) ACE1 Villorba Corse	2:50.933
Free Practice 2	GT	88	(Japan) Team JLOC	2:58.787
Free Practice 2	GT Am	16	(China) Astro Veloce Motorsport	3:04.525

== Qualifying ==
British driver Ben Barnicoat took pole position for the 4 Hours of The Bend with a time of 2:35.698 driving a Dallara P217 LMP2 for Thunderhead Carlin Racing. It was the first time that the Dallara P217 had scored a pole position in any LMP2 competition. Young Scottish driver Colin Noble took pole in LMP3 with a time of 2:50.802 in his Norma M30 for Nielsen Racing's first ever LMP3 pole, while Italian Davide Rigon scored the GT pole in the HubAuto Corsa's Ferrari 488 GT3 Evo 2020 with a 2:56.109 lap.

=== Qualifying results ===
Pole positions in each class are indicated in bold.

Pos.	Class	No.	Entry	Car	Time
1	**LMP2**	**45**	**(United Kingdom) Thunderhead Carlin Racing**	**Dallara P217**	**2:35.698**
2	LMP2	1	(Philippines) Eurasia Motorsport	Ligier JS P217	2:35.870
3	LMP2	26	(Russia) G-Drive Racing with Algarve	Aurus 01	2:36.711
4	LMP2	34	(Poland) Inter Europol Endurance	Ligier JS P217	2:36.772
5	LMP2	36	(Philippines) Eurasia Motorsport	Ligier JS P217	2:37.262
6	**LMP2 Am**	**59**	**(United Kingdom) RLR MSport**	**Oreca 05**	**2:43.235**
7	LMP2 Am	4	(Slovakia) ARC Bratislava	Ligier JS P2	2:43.957
8	LMP2 Am	52	(United States) Rick Ware Racing	Ligier JS P2	2:44.884
9	LMP2	33	(Poland) Inter Europol Endurance	Ligier JS P217	2:46.044
10	LMP2 Am	25	(United States) Rick Ware Racing	Ligier JS P2	2:48.471
11	**LMP3**	**2**	**(United Kingdom) Nielsen Racing**	**Norma M30**	**2:50.802**
12	LMP3	12	(Italy) ACE1 Villorba Corse	Ligier JS P3	2:51.925
13	LMP3	9	(France) Graff Racing	Norma M30	2:51.952
14	LMP3	13	(Poland) Inter Europol Competition	Ligier JS P3	2:52.298
15	LMP3	14	(Poland) Inter Europol Competition	Ligier JS P3	2:54.512
16	**GT**	**27**	**(Chinese Taipei) HubAuto Corsa**	**Ferrari 488 GT3 Evo 2020**	**2:56.109**
17	GT	7	(Japan) Car Guy Racing	Ferrari 488 GT3	2:56.924
18	GT	17	(China) Astro Veloce Motorsport	BMW M6 GT3	2:58.442
19	GT	75	(Singapore) T2 Motorsports	Ferrari 488 GT3	2:58.462
20	GT	51	(Switzerland) Spirit of Race	Ferrari 488 GT3	2:58.509
21	GT	88	(Japan) Team JLOC	Lamborghini Huracán GT3 Evo	2:58.605
22	GT	77	(Japan) D'station Racing AMR	Aston Martin Vantage AMR GT3	2:59.284
23	LMP3	65	(Malaysia) Viper Niza Racing	Ligier JS P3	3:08.667
24	**GT Am**	**16**	**(China) Astro Veloce Motorsport**	**BMW M6 GT3**	**3:20.329**
25	LMP3	3	(United Kingdom) Nielsen Racing	Norma M30	—

== Race ==
=== Race results ===
The minimum number of laps for classification (70% of overall winning car's distance) was 54 laps. Class winners are marked in bold.

Pos.	Class	No.	Entry	Drivers	Car	Laps	Time/Gap
Pos.	Class	No.	Entry	Drivers	Engine	Laps	Time/Gap
1	**LMP2**	**26**	**(Russia) G-Drive Racing with Algarve**	**(United States) James French** **(Netherlands) Leonard Hoogenboom** **(Russia) Roman Rusinov**	**Aurus 01**	**78**	**4:05:23.417**
1	**LMP2**	**26**	**(Russia) G-Drive Racing with Algarve**	**(United States) James French** **(Netherlands) Leonard Hoogenboom** **(Russia) Roman Rusinov**	**Gibson GK428 4.2 L V8**	**78**	**4:05:23.417**
2	LMP2	36	(Philippines) Eurasia Motorsport	(Australia) Nick Foster (Spain) Roberto Merhi (Australia) Aidan Read	Ligier JS P217	78	+44.886
2	LMP2	36	(Philippines) Eurasia Motorsport	(Australia) Nick Foster (Spain) Roberto Merhi (Australia) Aidan Read	Gibson GK428 4.2 L V8	78	+44.886
3	LMP2	45	(United Kingdom) Thunderhead Carlin Racing	(United Kingdom) Ben Barnicoat (United Kingdom) Jack Manchester (United Kingdom) Harry Tincknell	Dallara P217	78	+2:10.774
3	LMP2	45	(United Kingdom) Thunderhead Carlin Racing	(United Kingdom) Ben Barnicoat (United Kingdom) Jack Manchester (United Kingdom) Harry Tincknell	Gibson GK428 4.2 L V8	78	+2:10.774
4	LMP2	33	(Poland) Inter Europol Endurance	(Australia) John Corbett (Australia) Nathan Kumar (Australia) Mitchell Neilson	Ligier JS P217	75	+3 Laps
4	LMP2	33	(Poland) Inter Europol Endurance	(Australia) John Corbett (Australia) Nathan Kumar (Australia) Mitchell Neilson	Gibson GK428 4.2 L V8	75	+3 Laps
5	**LMP2 Am**	**52**	**(United States) Rick Ware Racing**	**(Lithuania) Gustas Grinbergas** **(United States) Cody Ware**	**Ligier JS P2**	**75**	**+3 Laps**
5	**LMP2 Am**	**52**	**(United States) Rick Ware Racing**	**(Lithuania) Gustas Grinbergas** **(United States) Cody Ware**	**Nissan VK45DE 4.5 L V8**	**75**	**+3 Laps**
6	LMP2 Am	25	(United States) Rick Ware Racing	(United States) Philippe Mulacek (United States) Guy Cosmo (United States) Anthony Lazzaro	Ligier JS P2	75	+3 Laps
6	LMP2 Am	25	(United States) Rick Ware Racing	(United States) Philippe Mulacek (United States) Guy Cosmo (United States) Anthony Lazzaro	Nissan VK45DE 4.5 L V8	75	+3 Laps
7	LMP2 Am	4	(Slovakia) ARC Bratislava	(Slovakia) Miro Konôpka (Greece) Andreas Laskaratos (Australia) Garnet Patterson	Ligier JS P2	74	+4 Laps
7	LMP2 Am	4	(Slovakia) ARC Bratislava	(Slovakia) Miro Konôpka (Greece) Andreas Laskaratos (Australia) Garnet Patterson	Nissan VK45DE 4.5 L V8	74	+4 Laps
8	**LMP3**	**2**	**(United Kingdom) Nielsen Racing**	**(United Kingdom) Colin Noble** **(United Kingdom) Tony Wells**	**Norma M30**	**73**	**+5 Laps**
8	**LMP3**	**2**	**(United Kingdom) Nielsen Racing**	**(United Kingdom) Colin Noble** **(United Kingdom) Tony Wells**	**Nissan VK50 5.0 L V8**	**73**	**+5 Laps**
9	LMP3	13	(Poland) Inter Europol Competition	(Germany) Martin Hippe (United Kingdom) Nigel Moore	Ligier JS P3	73	+5 Laps
9	LMP3	13	(Poland) Inter Europol Competition	(Germany) Martin Hippe (United Kingdom) Nigel Moore	Nissan VK50 5.0 L V8	73	+5 Laps
10	LMP3	12	(Italy) ACE1 Villorba Corse	(Italy) Alessandro Bressan (Italy) Gabriele Lancieri (Italy) David Fumanelli	Ligier JS P3	73	+5 Laps
10	LMP3	12	(Italy) ACE1 Villorba Corse	(Italy) Alessandro Bressan (Italy) Gabriele Lancieri (Italy) David Fumanelli	Nissan VK50 5.0 L V8	73	+5 Laps
11	**GT**	**7**	**(Japan) Car Guy Racing**	**(Italy) Kei Cozzolino** **(Japan) Takeshi Kimura** **(France) Côme Ledogar**	**Ferrari 488 GT3**	**71**	**+7 Laps**
11	**GT**	**7**	**(Japan) Car Guy Racing**	**(Italy) Kei Cozzolino** **(Japan) Takeshi Kimura** **(France) Côme Ledogar**	**Ferrari F154CB 3.9 L Turbo V8**	**71**	**+7 Laps**
12	GT	27	(Chinese Taipei) HubAuto Corsa	(Australia) Liam Talbot (Brazil) Marcos Gomes (Italy) Davide Rigon	Ferrari 488 GT3 Evo 2020	71	+7 Laps
12	GT	27	(Chinese Taipei) HubAuto Corsa	(Australia) Liam Talbot (Brazil) Marcos Gomes (Italy) Davide Rigon	Ferrari F154CB 3.9 L Turbo V8	71	+7 Laps
13	GT	51	(Switzerland) Spirit of Race	(Brazil) Oswaldo Negri Jr. (Italy) Alessandro Pier Guidi (Puerto Rico) Francesco Piovanetti	Ferrari 488 GT3	71	+7 Laps
13	GT	51	(Switzerland) Spirit of Race	(Brazil) Oswaldo Negri Jr. (Italy) Alessandro Pier Guidi (Puerto Rico) Francesco Piovanetti	Ferrari F154CB 3.9 L Turbo V8	71	+7 Laps
14	GT	75	(Singapore) T2 Motorsports	(Italy) Christian Colombo (Indonesia) Rio Haryanto (Indonesia) David Tjiptobiantoro	Ferrari 488 GT3	71	+7 Laps
14	GT	75	(Singapore) T2 Motorsports	(Italy) Christian Colombo (Indonesia) Rio Haryanto (Indonesia) David Tjiptobiantoro	Ferrari F154CB 3.9 L Turbo V8	71	+7 Laps
15	GT	17	(China) Astro Veloce Motorsport	(Germany) Jens Klingmann (China) Aven Qi (Italy) Max Wiser	BMW M6 GT3	71	+7 Laps
15	GT	17	(China) Astro Veloce Motorsport	(Germany) Jens Klingmann (China) Aven Qi (Italy) Max Wiser	BMW 4.4 L V8	71	+7 Laps
16	LMP3	14	(Poland) Inter Europol Competition	(Australia) Peter Paddon (Australia) Garth Walden (United States) Austin McCusker	Ligier JS P3	68	+10 Laps
16	LMP3	14	(Poland) Inter Europol Competition	(Australia) Peter Paddon (Australia) Garth Walden (United States) Austin McCusker	Nissan VK50 5.0 L V8	68	+10 Laps
17	GT	77	(Japan) D'station Racing AMR	(Japan) Tomonobu Fujii (United Kingdom) Ross Gunn (Japan) Satoshi Hoshino	Aston Martin Vantage AMR GT3	65	+13 Laps
17	GT	77	(Japan) D'station Racing AMR	(Japan) Tomonobu Fujii (United Kingdom) Ross Gunn (Japan) Satoshi Hoshino	Aston Martin 4.0 L Turbo V8	65	+13 Laps
18	GT	88	(Japan) Team JLOC	(Macau) André Couto (Japan) Yuya Motojima (Japan) Yusaku Shibata	Lamborghini Huracán GT3 Evo	54	+24 Laps
18	GT	88	(Japan) Team JLOC	(Macau) André Couto (Japan) Yuya Motojima (Japan) Yusaku Shibata	Lamborghini 5.2 L V10	54	+24 Laps
Not Classified
DNF	LMP2	1	(Philippines) Eurasia Motorsport	(New Zealand) Daniel Gaunt (New Zealand) Nick Cassidy (New Zealand) Shane van Gisbergen	Ligier JS P217	73	
DNF	LMP2	1	(Philippines) Eurasia Motorsport	(New Zealand) Daniel Gaunt (New Zealand) Nick Cassidy (New Zealand) Shane van Gisbergen	Gibson GK428 4.2 L V8	73	
DNF	LMP3	9	(France) Graff Racing	(Switzerland) David Droux (France) Eric Trouillet (Australia) Ricky Capo	Norma M30	63	
DNF	LMP3	9	(France) Graff Racing	(Switzerland) David Droux (France) Eric Trouillet (Australia) Ricky Capo	Nissan VK50 5.0 L V8	63	
DNF	GT Am	16	(China) Astro Veloce Motorsport	(China) Michael Lu (China) David Weian Chen (China) Dennis Zhang	BMW M6 GT3	59	
DNF	GT Am	16	(China) Astro Veloce Motorsport	(China) Michael Lu (China) David Weian Chen (China) Dennis Zhang	BMW 4.4 L V8	59	
DNF	LMP3	65	(Malaysia) Viper Niza Racing	(Malaysia) Dominc Ang (Malaysia) Douglas Khoo	Ligier JS P3	57	
DNF	LMP3	65	(Malaysia) Viper Niza Racing	(Malaysia) Dominc Ang (Malaysia) Douglas Khoo	Nissan VK50 5.0 L V8	57	
DNF	LMP2 Am	59	(United Kingdom) RLR MSport	(Canada) John Farano (New Zealand) Andrew Higgins (India) Arjun Maini	Oreca 05	26	
DNF	LMP2 Am	59	(United Kingdom) RLR MSport	(Canada) John Farano (New Zealand) Andrew Higgins (India) Arjun Maini	Nissan VK45DE 4.5 L V8	26	
DNF	LMP3	3	(United Kingdom) Nielsen Racing	(United States) Charles Crews (Canada) Garett Grist (United States) Rob Hodes	Norma M30	23	
DNF	LMP3	3	(United Kingdom) Nielsen Racing	(United States) Charles Crews (Canada) Garett Grist (United States) Rob Hodes	Nissan VK50 5.0 L V8	23	
DNF	LMP2	34	(Poland) Inter Europol Endurance	(Switzerland) Mathias Beche (Poland) Jakub Śmiechowski (Australia) James Winslow	Ligier JS P217	19	
DNF	LMP2	34	(Poland) Inter Europol Endurance	(Switzerland) Mathias Beche (Poland) Jakub Śmiechowski (Australia) James Winslow	Gibson GK428 4.2 L V8	19	
