= 2019 Agile Lohas World 4 Hours of Shanghai =

Track map of the Shanghai International Circuit

The 2019 4 Hours of Shanghai was an endurance sportscar racing event held on November 24, 2019, at Shanghai International Circuit in Shanghai, China. It served as the first round of the 2019–20 Asian Le Mans Series.

== Schedule ==
Date	Time (local: CST)	Event
Friday, 22 November	13:50	Free Practice 1
Saturday, 23 November	11:30	Free Practice 2
Saturday, 23 November	16:00	Qualifying
Sunday, 24 November	9:45	Race

== Free practice ==
- Only the fastest car in each class is shown.

Free Practice 1	Class	No.	Entrant	Time
Free Practice 1	LMP2	45	(United Kingdom) Thunderhead Carlin Racing	1:53.232
Free Practice 1	LMP2 Am	59	(United Kingdom) RLR MSport	1:57.244
Free Practice 1	LMP3	9	(France) Graff Racing	2:01.537
Free Practice 1	GT	90	(Chinese Taipei) FIST-Team AAI	2:04.045
Free Practice 1	GT Am	—		
Free Practice 2	Class	No.	Entrant	Time
Free Practice 2	LMP2	26	(Russia) G-Drive Racing with Algarve	1:54.003
Free Practice 2	LMP2 Am	59	(United Kingdom) RLR MSport	1:57.553
Free Practice 2	LMP3	3	(United Kingdom) Nielsen Racing	2:02.142
Free Practice 2	GT	27	(Chinese Taipei) HubAuto Corsa	2:04.028
Free Practice 2	GT Am	16	(China) Astro Veloce Motorsport	2:14.217

== Qualifying results ==
Pole positions in each class are indicated in bold.

Pos.	Class	No.	Entry	Car	Time
1	**LMP2**	**36**	**(Philippines) Eurasia Motorsport**	**Ligier JS P217**	**1:53.191**
2	LMP2	45	(United Kingdom) Thunderhead Carlin Racing	Dallara P217	1:53.242
3	LMP2	26	(Russia) G-Drive Racing with Algarve	Aurus 01	1:53.410
4	LMP2	34	(Poland) Inter Europol Endurance	Ligier JS P217	1:53.457
5	LMP2	96	(Japan) K2 Uchino Racing	Oreca 07	1:53.580
6	LMP2	1	(Philippines) Eurasia Motorsport	Ligier JS P217	1:54.556
7	**LMP2 Am**	**4**	**(Slovakia) ARC Bratislava**	**Ligier JS P2**	**1:56.893**
8	LMP2 Am	59	(United Kingdom) RLR MSport	Oreca 05	1:57.841
9	LMP2	33	(Poland) Inter Europol Endurance	Ligier JS P217	1:58.608
10	**LMP3**	**3**	**(United Kingdom) Nielsen Racing**	**Norma M30**	**2:00.112**
11	LMP3	13	(Poland) Inter Europol Competition	Ligier JS P3	2:00.515
12	LMP3	2	(United Kingdom) Nielsen Racing	Norma M30	2:01.179
13	LMP3	9	(France) Graff Racing	Norma M30	2:01.215
14	LMP3	12	(Italy) ACE1 Villorba Corse	Ligier JS P3	2:01.719
15	**GT**	**27**	**(Chinese Taipei) HubAuto Corsa**	**Ferrari 488 GT3**	**2:03.760**
16	GT	51	(Switzerland) Spirit of Race	Ferrari 488 GT3	2:04.041
17	GT	77	(Japan) D'station Racing AMR	Aston Martin Vantage AMR GT3	2:04.042
18	LMP3	65	(Malaysia) Viper Niza Racing	Ligier JS P3	2:04.080
19	GT	7	(Japan) Car Guy Racing	Ferrari 488 GT3	2:04.106
20	GT	90	(Chinese Taipei) FIST-Team AAI	BMW M6 GT3	2:04.750
21	GT	75	(Singapore) T2 Motorsports	Ferrari 488 GT3	2:05.005
22	GT	88	(Japan) Team JLOC	Lamborghini Huracán GT3 Evo	2:05.050
23	GT	17	(China) Astro Veloce Motorsport	BMW M6 GT3	2:05.194
24	**GT Am**	**16**	**(China) Astro Veloce Motorsport**	**BMW M6 GT3**	**2:10.793**
DNS	LMP2 Am	25	(United States) Rick Ware Racing	Ligier JS P2	—
DNS	LMP2 Am	52	(United States) Rick Ware Racing	Ligier JS P2	—

== Race results ==
The minimum number of laps for classification (70% of overall winning car's distance) was 77 laps. Class winners are marked in bold.

Pos.	Class	No.	Entry	Drivers	Car	Laps	Time/Gap
Pos.	Class	No.	Entry	Drivers	Engine	Laps	Time/Gap
1	**LMP2**	**26**	**(Russia) G-Drive Racing with Algarve**	**(United States) James French** **(Netherlands) Leonard Hoogenboom** **(Russia) Roman Rusinov**	**Aurus 01**	**111**	**4:02:04.411**
1	**LMP2**	**26**	**(Russia) G-Drive Racing with Algarve**	**(United States) James French** **(Netherlands) Leonard Hoogenboom** **(Russia) Roman Rusinov**	**Gibson GK428 4.2 L V8**	**111**	**4:02:04.411**
2	LMP2	36	(Philippines) Eurasia Motorsport	(Australia) Nick Foster (Spain) Roberto Merhi (Australia) Aidan Read	Ligier JS P217	111	+41.729
2	LMP2	36	(Philippines) Eurasia Motorsport	(Australia) Nick Foster (Spain) Roberto Merhi (Australia) Aidan Read	Gibson GK428 4.2 L V8	111	+41.729
3 (Note: The No. 45 Thunderhead Carlin Racing was given a post-race penalty of three laps and 51 seconds for a driving time infringement for Ben Barnicoat.)	LMP2	45	(United Kingdom) Thunderhead Carlin Racing	(United Kingdom) Ben Barnicoat (United Kingdom) Jack Manchester (United Kingdom) Harry Tincknell	Dallara P217	108	+3 Laps
3	LMP2	45	(United Kingdom) Thunderhead Carlin Racing	(United Kingdom) Ben Barnicoat (United Kingdom) Jack Manchester (United Kingdom) Harry Tincknell	Gibson GK428 4.2 L V8	108	+3 Laps
4	LMP2	34	(Poland) Inter Europol Endurance	(Switzerland) Mathias Beche (Poland) Jakub Śmiechowski (Australia) James Winslow (Note: Winslow is a British Racing Driver who complete under an Australian License.)	Ligier JS P217	108	+3 Laps
4	LMP2	34	(Poland) Inter Europol Endurance	(Switzerland) Mathias Beche (Poland) Jakub Śmiechowski (Australia) James Winslow	Gibson GK428 4.2 L V8	108	+3 Laps
5	**LMP3**	**13**	**(Poland) Inter Europol Competition**	**(Germany) Martin Hippe** **(United Kingdom) Nigel Moore**	**Ligier JS P3**	**107**	**+4 Laps**
5	**LMP3**	**13**	**(Poland) Inter Europol Competition**	**(Germany) Martin Hippe** **(United Kingdom) Nigel Moore**	**Nissan VK50 5.0 L V8**	**107**	**+4 Laps**
6	**LMP2 Am**	**59**	**(United Kingdom) RLR MSport**	**(Canada) John Farano** **(New Zealand) Andrew Higgins** **(India) Arjun Maini**	**Oreca 05**	**106**	**+5 Laps**
6	**LMP2 Am**	**59**	**(United Kingdom) RLR MSport**	**(Canada) John Farano** **(New Zealand) Andrew Higgins** **(India) Arjun Maini**	**Nissan VK45DE 4.5 L V8**	**106**	**+5 Laps**
7	LMP3	2	(United Kingdom) Nielsen Racing	(United Kingdom) Colin Noble (United Kingdom) Tony Wells	Norma M30	106	+5 Laps
7	LMP3	2	(United Kingdom) Nielsen Racing	(United Kingdom) Colin Noble (United Kingdom) Tony Wells	Nissan VK50 5.0 L V8	106	+5 Laps
8	LMP2	33	(Poland) Inter Europol Endurance	(Australia) John Corbett (Australia) Nathan Kumar (Australia) Mitchell Neilson	Ligier JS P217	105	+6 Laps
8	LMP2	33	(Poland) Inter Europol Endurance	(Australia) John Corbett (Australia) Nathan Kumar (Australia) Mitchell Neilson	Gibson GK428 4.2 L V8	105	+6 Laps
9	LMP3	9	(France) Graff Racing	(Switzerland) David Droux (France) Eric Trouillet (Switzerland) Sébastien Page	Norma M30	105	+6 Laps
9	LMP3	9	(France) Graff Racing	(Switzerland) David Droux (France) Eric Trouillet (Switzerland) Sébastien Page	Nissan VK50 5.0 L V8	105	+6 Laps
10	**GT**	**77**	**(Japan) D'station Racing AMR**	**(Japan) Tomonobu Fujii** **(United Kingdom) Ross Gunn** **(Japan) Satoshi Hoshino**	**Aston Martin Vantage AMR GT3**	**105**	**+6 Laps**
10	**GT**	**77**	**(Japan) D'station Racing AMR**	**(Japan) Tomonobu Fujii** **(United Kingdom) Ross Gunn** **(Japan) Satoshi Hoshino**	**Aston Martin 4.0 L Turbo V8**	**105**	**+6 Laps**
11	LMP3	12	(Italy) ACE1 Villorba Corse	(Italy) Alessandro Bressan (Italy) Gabriele Lancieri (Japan) Yuki Harata	Ligier JS P3	104	+7 Laps
11	LMP3	12	(Italy) ACE1 Villorba Corse	(Italy) Alessandro Bressan (Italy) Gabriele Lancieri (Japan) Yuki Harata	Nissan VK50 5.0 L V8	104	+7 Laps
12	GT	88	(Japan) Team JLOC	(Macau) André Couto (Japan) Yuya Motojima (Japan) Yusaku Shibata	Lamborghini Huracán GT3 Evo	104	+7 Laps
12	GT	88	(Japan) Team JLOC	(Macau) André Couto (Japan) Yuya Motojima (Japan) Yusaku Shibata	Lamborghini 5.2 L V10	104	+7 Laps
13	GT	17	(China) Astro Veloce Motorsport	(Germany) Jens Klingmann (China) Aven Qi (Italy) Max Wiser	BMW M6 GT3	104	+7 Laps
13	GT	17	(China) Astro Veloce Motorsport	(Germany) Jens Klingmann (China) Aven Qi (Italy) Max Wiser	BMW 4.4 L V8	104	+7 Laps
14	LMP2 Am	52	(United States) Rick Ware Racing	(United States) Mark Kvamme (United States) Cody Ware	Ligier JS P2	104	+7 Laps
14	LMP2 Am	52	(United States) Rick Ware Racing	(United States) Mark Kvamme (United States) Cody Ware	Nissan VK45DE 4.5 L V8	104	+7 Laps
15	GT	51	(Switzerland) Spirit of Race	(Brazil) Oswaldo Negri Jr. (Italy) Alessandro Pier Guidi (Puerto Rico) Francesco Piovanetti	Ferrari 488 GT3	104	+7 Laps
15	GT	51	(Switzerland) Spirit of Race	(Brazil) Oswaldo Negri Jr. (Italy) Alessandro Pier Guidi (Puerto Rico) Francesco Piovanetti	Ferrari F154CB 3.9 L Turbo V8	104	+7 Laps
16	GT	7	(Japan) Car Guy Racing	(Italy) Kei Cozzolino (Japan) Takeshi Kimura (Italy) Antonio Fuoco	Ferrari 488 GT3	104	+7 Laps
16	GT	7	(Japan) Car Guy Racing	(Italy) Kei Cozzolino (Japan) Takeshi Kimura (Italy) Antonio Fuoco	Ferrari F154CB 3.9 L Turbo V8	104	+7 Laps
17	GT	27	(Chinese Taipei) HubAuto Corsa	(Chinese Taipei) Morris Chen (Brazil) Marcos Gomes (Italy) Davide Rigon	Ferrari 488 GT3	104	+7 Laps
17	GT	27	(Chinese Taipei) HubAuto Corsa	(Chinese Taipei) Morris Chen (Brazil) Marcos Gomes (Italy) Davide Rigon	Ferrari F154CB 3.9 L Turbo V8	104	+7 Laps
18	GT	75	(Singapore) T2 Motorsports	(Italy) Christian Colombo (Indonesia) Rio Haryanto (Indonesia) David Tjiptobiantoro	Ferrari 488 GT3	104	+7 Laps
18	GT	75	(Singapore) T2 Motorsports	(Italy) Christian Colombo (Indonesia) Rio Haryanto (Indonesia) David Tjiptobiantoro	Ferrari F154CB 3.9 L Turbo V8	104	+7 Laps
19	LMP3	65	(Malaysia) Viper Niza Racing	(Malaysia) Dominc Ang (Malaysia) Douglas Khoo	Ligier JS P3	103	+8 Laps
19	LMP3	65	(Malaysia) Viper Niza Racing	(Malaysia) Dominc Ang (Malaysia) Douglas Khoo	Nissan VK50 5.0 L V8	103	+8 Laps
20	LMP3	3	(United Kingdom) Nielsen Racing	(United States) Charles Crews (Canada) Garett Grist (United States) Rob Hodes	Norma M30	103	+8 Laps
20	LMP3	3	(United Kingdom) Nielsen Racing	(United States) Charles Crews (Canada) Garett Grist (United States) Rob Hodes	Nissan VK50 5.0 L V8	103	+8 Laps
Not Classified
DNF	LMP2	96	(Japan) K2 Uchino Racing	(Japan) Haruki Kurosawa (Hong Kong) Shaun Thong	Oreca 07	107	
DNF	LMP2	96	(Japan) K2 Uchino Racing	(Japan) Haruki Kurosawa (Hong Kong) Shaun Thong	Gibson GK428 4.2 L V8	107	
DNF	LMP2 Am	4	(Slovakia) ARC Bratislava	(Slovakia) Miro Konôpka (Greece) Andreas Laskaratos (China) Kang Ling	Ligier JS P2	77	
DNF	LMP2 Am	4	(Slovakia) ARC Bratislava	(Slovakia) Miro Konôpka (Greece) Andreas Laskaratos (China) Kang Ling	Nissan VK45DE 4.5 L V8	77	
DNF	LMP2	1	(Philippines) Eurasia Motorsport	(New Zealand) Daniel Gaunt (Japan) Nobuya Yamanaka (Japan) Masataka Yanagida	Ligier JS P217	27	
DNF	LMP2	1	(Philippines) Eurasia Motorsport	(New Zealand) Daniel Gaunt (Japan) Nobuya Yamanaka (Japan) Masataka Yanagida	Gibson GK428 4.2 L V8	27	
DNF	GT	90	(Chinese Taipei) FIST-Team AAI	(Chinese Taipei) Jun-San Chen (Sweden) Joel Eriksson (China) Ye Hongli	BMW M6 GT3	17	
DNF	GT	90	(Chinese Taipei) FIST-Team AAI	(Chinese Taipei) Jun-San Chen (Sweden) Joel Eriksson (China) Ye Hongli	BMW 4.4 L V8	17	
