= 2020 4 Hours of Buriram =

Track map of the Buriram International Circuit

The 2020 4 Hours of Buriram was an endurance sportscar racing event held on February 23, 2020, at Buriram International Circuit in Buriram, Thailand. It served as the fourth and final round of the 2019–20 Asian Le Mans Series.

== Schedule ==
Date	Time (local: ICT)	Event
Saturday, 22 February	8:40	Free Practice 1
Saturday, 22 February	12:30	Free Practice 2
Saturday, 22 February	16:35	Qualifying
Sunday, 23 February	11:45	Race

== Free practice ==
- Only the fastest car in each class is shown.

Free Practice 1	Class	No.	Entrant	Time
Free Practice 1	LMP2	36	(Philippines) Eurasia Motorsport	1:23.186
Free Practice 1	LMP2 Am	25	(United States) Rick Ware Racing	1:28.929
Free Practice 1	LMP3	9	(France) Graff Racing	1:30.737
Free Practice 1	GT	27	(Chinese Taipei) HubAuto Corsa	1:34.214
Free Practice 2	Class	No.	Entrant	Time
Free Practice 2	LMP2	45	(United Kingdom) Thunderhead Carlin Racing	1:23.364
Free Practice 2	LMP2 Am	25	(United States) Rick Ware Racing	1:27.754
Free Practice 2	LMP3	2	(United Kingdom) Nielsen Racing	1:30.485
Free Practice 2	GT	27	(Chinese Taipei) HubAuto Corsa	1:33.927

== Qualifying results ==
Pole positions in each class are indicated in bold.

Pos.	Class	No.	Entry	Car	Time
1	**LMP2**	**45**	**(United Kingdom) Thunderhead Carlin Racing**	**Dallara P217**	**1:22.758**
2	LMP2	1	(Philippines) Eurasia Motorsport	Ligier JS P217	1:22.904
3	LMP2	36	(Philippines) Eurasia Motorsport	Ligier JS P217	1:23.460
4	LMP2	26	(Russia) G-Drive Racing with Algarve	Aurus 01	1:23.511
5	LMP2	96	(Japan) K2 Uchino Racing	Oreca 07	1:23.555
6	LMP2	34	(Poland) Inter Europol Endurance	Ligier JS P217	1:23.627
7	LMP2	33	(Poland) Inter Europol Endurance	Ligier JS P217	1:26.038
8	**LMP2 Am**	**25**	**(United States) Rick Ware Racing**	**Ligier JS P2**	**1:27.035**
9	LMP2 Am	52	(United States) Rick Ware Racing	Ligier JS P2	1:28.7 09
10	**LMP3**	**2**	**(United Kingdom) Nielsen Racing**	**Norma M30**	**1:29.001**
11	LMP3	3	(United Kingdom) Nielsen Racing	Norma M30	1:29.399
12	LMP3	9	(France) Graff Racing	Norma M30	1:29.543
13	LMP3	8	(France) Graff Racing	Norma M30	1:30.125
14	LMP3	13	(Poland) Inter Europol Competition	Ligier JS P3	1:30.234
15	LMP3	12	(Italy) ACE1 Villorba Corse	Ligier JS P3	1:30.387
16	LMP3	65	(Malaysia) Viper Niza Racing	Ligier JS P3	1:30.862
17	LMP3	18	(Poland) Inter Europol Competition	Ligier JS P3	1:31.621
18	**GT**	**75**	**(Singapore) T2 Motorsports**	**Ferrari 488 GT3**	**1:32.776**
19	GT	27	(Chinese Taipei) HubAuto Corsa	Ferrari 488 GT3 Evo 2020	1:32.836
20	GT	51	(Switzerland) Spirit of Race	Ferrari 488 GT3	1:32.925
21	GT	77	(Japan) D'station Racing AMR	Aston Martin Vantage AMR GT3	1:32.929
22	GT	7	(Japan) Car Guy Racing	Ferrari 488 GT3	1:32.949
23	GT	88	(Japan) Team JLOC	Lamborghini Huracán GT3 Evo	1:33.794

== Race results ==
The minimum number of laps for classification (70% of overall winning car's distance) was 109 laps. Class winners are marked in bold.

Pos.	Class	No.	Entry	Drivers	Car	Laps	Time/Gap
Pos.	Class	No.	Entry	Drivers	Engine	Laps	Time/Gap
1	**LMP2**	**45**	**(United Kingdom) Thunderhead Carlin Racing**	**(United Kingdom) Ben Barnicoat** **(United Kingdom) Jack Manchester** **(United Kingdom) Harry Tincknell**	**Dallara P217**	**157**	**4:02:10.209**
1	**LMP2**	**45**	**(United Kingdom) Thunderhead Carlin Racing**	**(United Kingdom) Ben Barnicoat** **(United Kingdom) Jack Manchester** **(United Kingdom) Harry Tincknell**	**Gibson GK428 4.2 L V8**	**157**	**4:02:10.209**
2	LMP2	26	(Russia) G-Drive Racing with Algarve	(United States) James French (Netherlands) Leonard Hoogenboom (Russia) Roman Rusinov	Aurus 01	157	+17.721
2	LMP2	26	(Russia) G-Drive Racing with Algarve	(United States) James French (Netherlands) Leonard Hoogenboom (Russia) Roman Rusinov	Gibson GK428 4.2 L V8	157	+17.721
3	LMP2	96	(Japan) K2 Uchino Racing	(Japan) Haruki Kurosawa (Hong Kong) Shaun Thong	Oreca 07	155	+2 Laps
3	LMP2	96	(Japan) K2 Uchino Racing	(Japan) Haruki Kurosawa (Hong Kong) Shaun Thong	Gibson GK428 4.2 L V8	155	+2 Laps
4	LMP2	1	(Philippines) Eurasia Motorsport	(New Zealand) Daniel Gaunt (New Zealand) Nick Cassidy (Japan) Nobuya Yamanaka	Ligier JS P217	155	+2 Laps
4	LMP2	1	(Philippines) Eurasia Motorsport	(New Zealand) Daniel Gaunt (New Zealand) Nick Cassidy (Japan) Nobuya Yamanaka	Gibson GK428 4.2 L V8	155	+2 Laps
5	LMP2	36	(Philippines) Eurasia Motorsport	(Australia) Nick Foster (Spain) Roberto Merhi (Australia) Aidan Read	Ligier JS P217	153	+4 Laps
5	LMP2	36	(Philippines) Eurasia Motorsport	(Australia) Nick Foster (Spain) Roberto Merhi (Australia) Aidan Read	Gibson GK428 4.2 L V8	153	+4 Laps
6	LMP2	33	(Poland) Inter Europol Endurance	(Australia) John Corbett (Australia) Nathan Kumar (Singapore) Danial Frost	Ligier JS P217	152	+5 Laps
6	LMP2	33	(Poland) Inter Europol Endurance	(Australia) John Corbett (Australia) Nathan Kumar (Singapore) Danial Frost	Gibson GK428 4.2 L V8	152	+5 Laps
7	**LMP2 Am**	**25**	**(United States) Rick Ware Racing**	**(United States) Philippe Mulacek** **(United States) Guy Cosmo** **(United States) Anthony Lazzaro**	**Ligier JS P2**	**147**	**+10 Laps**
7	**LMP2 Am**	**25**	**(United States) Rick Ware Racing**	**(United States) Philippe Mulacek** **(United States) Guy Cosmo** **(United States) Anthony Lazzaro**	**Nissan VK45DE 4.5 L V8**	**147**	**+10 Laps**
8	**LMP3**	**12**	**(Italy) ACE1 Villorba Corse**	**(Italy) Alessandro Bressan** **(Italy) Gabriele Lancieri** **(Italy) David Fumanelli**	**Ligier JS P3**	**146**	**+11 Laps**
8	**LMP3**	**12**	**(Italy) ACE1 Villorba Corse**	**(Italy) Alessandro Bressan** **(Italy) Gabriele Lancieri** **(Italy) David Fumanelli**	**Nissan VK50 5.0 L V8**	**146**	**+11 Laps**
9	LMP3	2	(United Kingdom) Nielsen Racing	(United Kingdom) Colin Noble (United Kingdom) Tony Wells	Norma M30	146	+11 Laps
9	LMP3	2	(United Kingdom) Nielsen Racing	(United Kingdom) Colin Noble (United Kingdom) Tony Wells	Nissan VK50 5.0 L V8	146	+11 Laps
10	LMP3	8	(France) Graff Racing	(Liechtenstein) Matthias Kaiser (Australia) Neale Muston	Norma M30	145	+12 Laps
10	LMP3	8	(France) Graff Racing	(Liechtenstein) Matthias Kaiser (Australia) Neale Muston	Nissan VK50 5.0 L V8	145	+12 Laps
11	**GT**	**27**	**(Chinese Taipei) HubAuto Corsa**	**(Australia) Liam Talbot** **(Brazil) Marcos Gomes** **(Australia) Tim Slade**	**Ferrari 488 GT3 Evo 2020**	**144**	**+13 Laps**
11	**GT**	**27**	**(Chinese Taipei) HubAuto Corsa**	**(Australia) Liam Talbot** **(Brazil) Marcos Gomes** **(Australia) Tim Slade**	**Ferrari F154CB 3.9 L Turbo V8**	**144**	**+13 Laps**
12	LMP3	65	(Malaysia) Viper Niza Racing	(Malaysia) Dominc Ang (Malaysia) Douglas Khoo	Ligier JS P3	143	+14 Laps
12	LMP3	65	(Malaysia) Viper Niza Racing	(Malaysia) Dominc Ang (Malaysia) Douglas Khoo	Nissan VK50 5.0 L V8	143	+14 Laps
13	GT	7	(Japan) Car Guy Racing	(Denmark) Mikkel Jensen (Japan) Takeshi Kimura (France) Côme Ledogar	Ferrari 488 GT3	142	+15 Laps
13	GT	7	(Japan) Car Guy Racing	(Denmark) Mikkel Jensen (Japan) Takeshi Kimura (France) Côme Ledogar	Ferrari F154CB 3.9 L Turbo V8	142	+15 Laps
14	GT	51	(Switzerland) Spirit of Race	(Brazil) Oswaldo Negri Jr. (Brazil) Daniel Serra (Puerto Rico) Francesco Piovanetti	Ferrari 488 GT3	142	+15 Laps
14	GT	51	(Switzerland) Spirit of Race	(Brazil) Oswaldo Negri Jr. (Brazil) Daniel Serra (Puerto Rico) Francesco Piovanetti	Ferrari F154CB 3.9 L Turbo V8	142	+15 Laps
15	LMP2	34	(Poland) Inter Europol Endurance	(Switzerland) Mathias Beche (Poland) Jakub Śmiechowski (Australia) James Winslow	Ligier JS P217	142	+15 Laps
15	LMP2	34	(Poland) Inter Europol Endurance	(Switzerland) Mathias Beche (Poland) Jakub Śmiechowski (Australia) James Winslow	Gibson GK428 4.2 L V8	142	+15 Laps
16	GT	88	(Japan) Team JLOC	(Japan) Takashi Kogure (Japan) Yuya Motojima (Japan) Yusaku Shibata	Lamborghini Huracán GT3 Evo	141	+16 Laps
16	GT	88	(Japan) Team JLOC	(Japan) Takashi Kogure (Japan) Yuya Motojima (Japan) Yusaku Shibata	Lamborghini 5.2 L V10	141	+16 Laps
17	LMP3	3	(United Kingdom) Nielsen Racing	(United States) Charles Crews (Canada) Garett Grist (United States) Rob Hodes	Norma M30	141	+16 Laps
17	LMP3	3	(United Kingdom) Nielsen Racing	(United States) Charles Crews (Canada) Garett Grist (United States) Rob Hodes	Nissan VK50 5.0 L V8	141	+16 Laps
18	GT	75	(Singapore) T2 Motorsports	(Italy) Christian Colombo (Indonesia) Rio Haryanto (Indonesia) David Tjiptobiantoro	Ferrari 488 GT3	133	+24 Laps
18	GT	75	(Singapore) T2 Motorsports	(Italy) Christian Colombo (Indonesia) Rio Haryanto (Indonesia) David Tjiptobiantoro	Ferrari F154CB 3.9 L Turbo V8	133	+24 Laps
19	LMP2 Am	52	(United States) Rick Ware Racing	(Lithuania) Gustas Grinbergas (United States) Cody Ware	Ligier JS P2	128	+29 Laps
19	LMP2 Am	52	(United States) Rick Ware Racing	(Lithuania) Gustas Grinbergas (United States) Cody Ware	Nissan VK45DE 4.5 L V8	128	+29 Laps
Not Classified
DNF	LMP3	18	(Poland) Inter Europol Competition	(Hong Kong) Philip Kadoorie (United Kingdom) Dan Wells	Ligier JS P3	72	
DNF	LMP3	18	(Poland) Inter Europol Competition	(Hong Kong) Philip Kadoorie (United Kingdom) Dan Wells	Nissan VK50 5.0 L V8	72	
DNF	LMP3	9	(France) Graff Racing	(Switzerland) David Droux (France) Eric Trouillet (Switzerland) Sébastien Page	Norma M30	70	
DNF	LMP3	9	(France) Graff Racing	(Switzerland) David Droux (France) Eric Trouillet (Switzerland) Sébastien Page	Nissan VK50 5.0 L V8	70	
DNF	LMP3	13	(Poland) Inter Europol Competition	(Germany) Martin Hippe (United Kingdom) Nigel Moore	Ligier JS P3	54	
DNF	LMP3	13	(Poland) Inter Europol Competition	(Germany) Martin Hippe (United Kingdom) Nigel Moore	Nissan VK50 5.0 L V8	54	
DNF	GT	77	(Japan) D'station Racing AMR	(Japan) Tomonobu Fujii (United Kingdom) Tom Gamble (Japan) Satoshi Hoshino	Aston Martin Vantage AMR GT3	43	
DNF	GT	77	(Japan) D'station Racing AMR	(Japan) Tomonobu Fujii (United Kingdom) Tom Gamble (Japan) Satoshi Hoshino	Aston Martin 4.0 L Turbo V8	43	
