= 2020 4 Hours of Sepang =

Track map of Sepang International Circuit

The 2020 4 Hours of Sepang was an endurance sportscar racing event held on February 15, 2020, at Sepang International Circuit in Selangor, Malaysia. It served as the third round of the 2019-20 Asian Le Mans Series season.

The race was won by the #45 Thunderhead Carlin Racing Dallara P217 with drivers Ben Barnicoat, Jack Manchester and Harry Tincknell.

== Schedule ==
Date	Time (local: MST)	Event
Friday, 14 February	16:25	Free Practice 1
Friday, 14 February	20:00	Free Practice 2
Saturday, 15 February	12:00	Qualifying
Saturday, 15 February	17:00	Race

== Free practice ==
- Only the fastest car in each class is shown.

Free Practice 1	Class	No.	Entrant	Time
Free Practice 1	LMP2	34	(Poland) Inter Europol Endurance	2:12.915
Free Practice 1	LMP2 Am	52	(United States) Rick Ware Racing	2:18.037
Free Practice 1	LMP3	18	(Poland) Inter Europol Competition	2:18.748
Free Practice 1	GT	27	(Chinese Taipei) HubAuto Corsa	2:22.740
Free Practice 2	Class	No.	Entrant	Time
Free Practice 2	LMP2	1	(Philippines) Eurasia Motorsport	1:51.950
Free Practice 2	LMP2 Am	25	(United States) Rick Ware Racing	1:59.981
Free Practice 2	LMP3	3	(United Kingdom) Nielsen Racing	2:00.899
Free Practice 2	GT	7	(Japan) Car Guy Racing	2:04.891

== Qualifying ==
=== Qualifying results ===
Pole positions in each class are indicated in bold.

Pos.	Class	No.	Entry	Car	Time
1	**LMP2**	**1**	**(Philippines) Eurasia Motorsport**	**Ligier JS P217**	**1:53.094**
2	LMP2	96	(Japan) K2 Uchino Racing	Oreca 07	1:53.563
3	LMP2	26	(Russia) G-Drive Racing with Algarve	Aurus 01	1:53.701
4	LMP2	34	(Poland) Inter Europol Endurance	Ligier JS P217	1:53.711
5	LMP2	36	(Philippines) Eurasia Motorsport	Ligier JS P217	1:53.910
6	LMP2	45	(United Kingdom) Thunderhead Carlin Racing	Dallara P217	1:54.071
7	LMP2	33	(Poland) Inter Europol Endurance	Ligier JS P217	1:54.680
8	**LMP2 Am**	**25**	**(United States) Rick Ware Racing**	**Ligier JS P2**	**1:59.525**
9	LMP2 Am	52	(United States) Rick Ware Racing	Ligier JS P2	1:59.651
10	**LMP3**	**13**	**(Poland) Inter Europol Competition**	**Ligier JS P3**	**2:00.193**
11	LMP3	3	(United Kingdom) Nielsen Racing	Norma M30	2:00.271
12	LMP3	9	(France) Graff Racing	Norma M30	2:00.311
13	LMP3	2	(United Kingdom) Nielsen Racing	Norma M30	2:00.893
14	LMP3	12	(Italy) ACE1 Villorba Corse	Ligier JS P3	2:01.487
15	LMP3	65	(Malaysia) Viper Niza Racing	Ligier JS P3	2:01.705
16	LMP3	18	(Poland) Inter Europol Competition	Ligier JS P3	2:01.946
17	LMP3	8	(France) Graff Racing	Norma M30	2:02.037
18	**GT**	**7**	**(Japan) Car Guy Racing**	**Ferrari 488 GT3**	**2:04.141**
19	GT	51	(Switzerland) Spirit of Race	Ferrari 488 GT3	2:04.346
20	GT	27	(Chinese Taipei) HubAuto Corsa	Ferrari 488 GT3 Evo 2020	2:04.376
21	GT	77	(Japan) D'station Racing AMR	Aston Martin Vantage AMR GT3	2:04.510
22	GT	75	(Singapore) T2 Motorsports	Ferrari 488 GT3	2:04.871
23	GT	88	(Japan) Team JLOC	Lamborghini Huracán GT3 Evo	2:05.347

== Race ==
=== Race results ===
The minimum number of laps for classification (70% of overall winning car's distance) was 78 laps. Class winners are marked in bold.

Pos.	Class	No.	Entry	Drivers	Car	Laps	Time/Gap
Pos.	Class	No.	Entry	Drivers	Engine	Laps	Time/Gap
1	**LMP2**	**45**	**(United Kingdom) Thunderhead Carlin Racing**	**(United Kingdom) Ben Barnicoat** **(United Kingdom) Jack Manchester** **(United Kingdom) Harry Tincknell**	**Dallara P217**	**112**	**4:03:21.413**
1	**LMP2**	**45**	**(United Kingdom) Thunderhead Carlin Racing**	**(United Kingdom) Ben Barnicoat** **(United Kingdom) Jack Manchester** **(United Kingdom) Harry Tincknell**	**Gibson GK428 4.2 L V8**	**112**	**4:03:21.413**
2	LMP2	36	(Philippines) Eurasia Motorsport	(Australia) Nick Foster (Spain) Roberto Merhi (Australia) Aidan Read	Ligier JS P217	112	+10.881
2	LMP2	36	(Philippines) Eurasia Motorsport	(Australia) Nick Foster (Spain) Roberto Merhi (Australia) Aidan Read	Gibson GK428 4.2 L V8	112	+10.881
3	LMP2	26	(Russia) G-Drive Racing with Algarve	(United States) James French (Netherlands) Leonard Hoogenboom (Russia) Roman Rusinov	Aurus 01	111	+1 Lap
3	LMP2	26	(Russia) G-Drive Racing with Algarve	(United States) James French (Netherlands) Leonard Hoogenboom (Russia) Roman Rusinov	Gibson GK428 4.2 L V8	111	+1 Lap
4	LMP2	96	(Japan) K2 Uchino Racing	(Japan) Haruki Kurosawa (Hong Kong) Shaun Thong	Oreca 07	111	+1 Lap
4	LMP2	96	(Japan) K2 Uchino Racing	(Japan) Haruki Kurosawa (Hong Kong) Shaun Thong	Gibson GK428 4.2 L V8	111	+1 Lap
5	LMP2	34	(Poland) Inter Europol Endurance	(Switzerland) Mathias Beche (Poland) Jakub Śmiechowski (Australia) James Winslow	Ligier JS P217	110	+2 Laps
5	LMP2	34	(Poland) Inter Europol Endurance	(Switzerland) Mathias Beche (Poland) Jakub Śmiechowski (Australia) James Winslow	Gibson GK428 4.2 L V8	110	+2 Laps
6	LMP2	33	(Poland) Inter Europol Endurance	(Australia) John Corbett (Australia) Nathan Kumar (Singapore) Danial Frost	Ligier JS P217	109	+3 Laps
6	LMP2	33	(Poland) Inter Europol Endurance	(Australia) John Corbett (Australia) Nathan Kumar (Singapore) Danial Frost	Gibson GK428 4.2 L V8	109	+3 Laps
7	**LMP3**	**9**	**(France) Graff Racing**	**(Switzerland) David Droux** **(France) Eric Trouillet** **(Switzerland) Sébastien Page**	**Norma M30**	**105**	**+7 Laps**
7	**LMP3**	**9**	**(France) Graff Racing**	**(Switzerland) David Droux** **(France) Eric Trouillet** **(Switzerland) Sébastien Page**	**Nissan VK50 5.0 L V8**	**105**	**+7 Laps**
8	LMP3	3	(United Kingdom) Nielsen Racing	(United States) Charles Crews (Canada) Garett Grist (United States) Rob Hodes	Norma M30	104	+8 Laps
8	LMP3	3	(United Kingdom) Nielsen Racing	(United States) Charles Crews (Canada) Garett Grist (United States) Rob Hodes	Nissan VK50 5.0 L V8	104	+8 Laps
9	LMP3	13	(Poland) Inter Europol Competition	(Germany) Martin Hippe (United Kingdom) Nigel Moore	Ligier JS P3	104	+8 Laps
9	LMP3	13	(Poland) Inter Europol Competition	(Germany) Martin Hippe (United Kingdom) Nigel Moore	Nissan VK50 5.0 L V8	104	+8 Laps
10	LMP3	2	(United Kingdom) Nielsen Racing	(United Kingdom) Colin Noble (United Kingdom) Tony Wells	Norma M30	104	+8 Laps
10	LMP3	2	(United Kingdom) Nielsen Racing	(United Kingdom) Colin Noble (United Kingdom) Tony Wells	Nissan VK50 5.0 L V8	104	+8 Laps
11	**GT**	**88**	**(Japan) Team JLOC**	**(Japan) Takashi Kogure** **(Japan) Yuya Motojima** **(Japan) Yusaku Shibata**	**Lamborghini Huracán GT3 Evo**	**103**	**+9 Laps**
11	**GT**	**88**	**(Japan) Team JLOC**	**(Japan) Takashi Kogure** **(Japan) Yuya Motojima** **(Japan) Yusaku Shibata**	**Lamborghini 5.2 L V10**	**103**	**+9 Laps**
12	GT	27	(Chinese Taipei) HubAuto Corsa	(Australia) Liam Talbot (Brazil) Marcos Gomes (Italy) Davide Rigon	Ferrari 488 GT3 Evo 2020	103	+9 Laps
12	GT	27	(Chinese Taipei) HubAuto Corsa	(Australia) Liam Talbot (Brazil) Marcos Gomes (Italy) Davide Rigon	Ferrari F154CB 3.9 L Turbo V8	103	+9 Laps
13	LMP3	12	(Italy) ACE1 Villorba Corse	(Italy) Alessandro Bressan (Italy) Gabriele Lancieri (Italy) David Fumanelli	Ligier JS P3	103	+9 Laps
13	LMP3	12	(Italy) ACE1 Villorba Corse	(Italy) Alessandro Bressan (Italy) Gabriele Lancieri (Italy) David Fumanelli	Nissan VK50 5.0 L V8	103	+9 Laps
14	LMP3	18	(Poland) Inter Europol Competition	(Hong Kong) Philip Kadoorie (United Kingdom) Dan Wells	Ligier JS P3	103	+9 Laps
14	LMP3	18	(Poland) Inter Europol Competition	(Hong Kong) Philip Kadoorie (United Kingdom) Dan Wells	Nissan VK50 5.0 L V8	103	+9 Laps
15	GT	51	(Switzerland) Spirit of Race	(Brazil) Oswaldo Negri Jr. (Italy) Alessandro Pier Guidi (Puerto Rico) Francesco Piovanetti	Ferrari 488 GT3	102	+10 Laps
15	GT	51	(Switzerland) Spirit of Race	(Brazil) Oswaldo Negri Jr. (Italy) Alessandro Pier Guidi (Puerto Rico) Francesco Piovanetti	Ferrari F154CB 3.9 L Turbo V8	102	+10 Laps
16	GT	75	(Singapore) T2 Motorsports	(Italy) Christian Colombo (Indonesia) Rio Haryanto (Indonesia) David Tjiptobiantoro	Ferrari 488 GT3	100	+12 Laps
16	GT	75	(Singapore) T2 Motorsports	(Italy) Christian Colombo (Indonesia) Rio Haryanto (Indonesia) David Tjiptobiantoro	Ferrari F154CB 3.9 L Turbo V8	100	+12 Laps
17	LMP3	8	(France) Graff Racing	(Liechtenstein) Matthias Kaiser (Finland) Rory Penttinen	Norma M30	98	+14 Laps
17	LMP3	8	(France) Graff Racing	(Liechtenstein) Matthias Kaiser (Finland) Rory Penttinen	Nissan VK50 5.0 L V8	98	+14 Laps
18	GT	7	(Japan) Car Guy Racing	(Italy) Kei Cozzolino (Japan) Takeshi Kimura (France) Côme Ledogar	Ferrari 488 GT3	95	+17 Laps
18	GT	7	(Japan) Car Guy Racing	(Italy) Kei Cozzolino (Japan) Takeshi Kimura (France) Côme Ledogar	Ferrari F154CB 3.9 L Turbo V8	95	+17 Laps
19	LMP3	65	(Malaysia) Viper Niza Racing	(Malaysia) Dominc Ang (Malaysia) Douglas Khoo	Ligier JS P3	94	+18 Laps
19	LMP3	65	(Malaysia) Viper Niza Racing	(Malaysia) Dominc Ang (Malaysia) Douglas Khoo	Nissan VK50 5.0 L V8	94	+18 Laps
20	**LMP2 Am**	**52**	**(United States) Rick Ware Racing**	**(Lithuania) Gustas Grinbergas** **(United States) Cody Ware**	**Ligier JS P2**	**89**	**+23 Laps**
20	**LMP2 Am**	**52**	**(United States) Rick Ware Racing**	**(Lithuania) Gustas Grinbergas** **(United States) Cody Ware**	**Nissan VK45DE 4.5 L V8**	**89**	**+23 Laps**
Not Classified
DNF	GT	77	(Japan) D'station Racing AMR	(Japan) Tomonobu Fujii (United Kingdom) Ross Gunn (Japan) Satoshi Hoshino	Aston Martin Vantage AMR GT3	89	Did not finish
DNF	GT	77	(Japan) D'station Racing AMR	(Japan) Tomonobu Fujii (United Kingdom) Ross Gunn (Japan) Satoshi Hoshino	Aston Martin 4.0 L Turbo V8	89	Did not finish
DNF	LMP2 Am	25	(United States) Rick Ware Racing	(United States) Philippe Mulacek (United States) Guy Cosmo (United States) Anthony Lazzaro	Ligier JS P2	85	Did not finish
DNF	LMP2 Am	25	(United States) Rick Ware Racing	(United States) Philippe Mulacek (United States) Guy Cosmo (United States) Anthony Lazzaro	Nissan VK45DE 4.5 L V8	85	Did not finish
DNF	LMP2	1	(Philippines) Eurasia Motorsport	(New Zealand) Daniel Gaunt (New Zealand) Nick Cassidy (Japan) Masataka Yanagida	Ligier JS P217	19	Wheel hub
DNF	LMP2	1	(Philippines) Eurasia Motorsport	(New Zealand) Daniel Gaunt (New Zealand) Nick Cassidy (Japan) Masataka Yanagida	Gibson GK428 4.2 L V8	19	Wheel hub
