= Dallara P217 =

Prototype sportscar

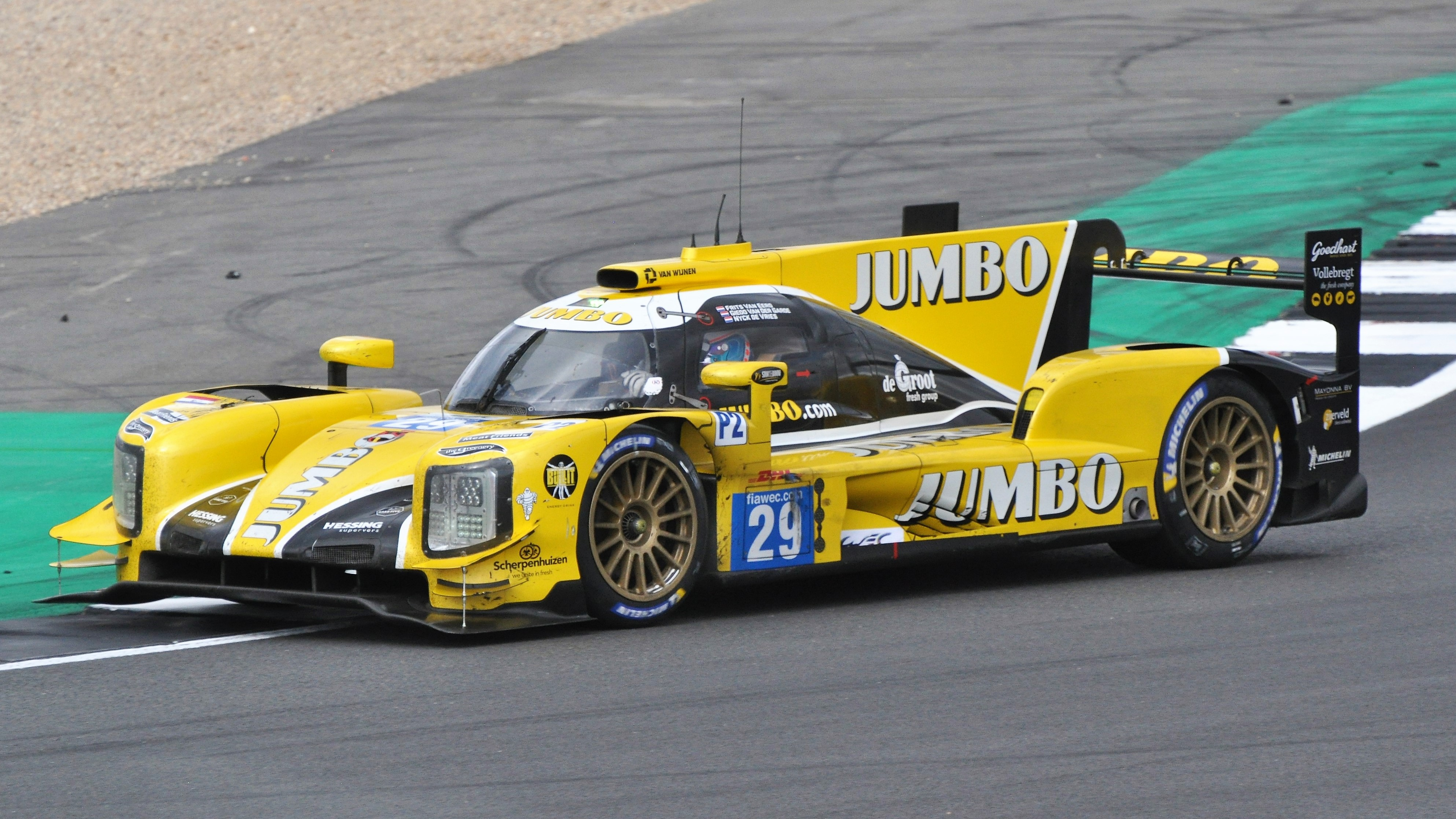
- Nyck de Vries during the 2018 6 Hours of Silverstone
- Category: Le Mans Prototype 2
- Constructor: Dallara
- Designer: Jos Claes

Technical specifications
- Chassis: Carbon-fibre monocoque with aluminium honeycomb and Zylon side panels
- Suspension (front): Double Wishbone Independent Pushrod
- Suspension (rear): As Front
- Length: 4745mm
- Width: 1900mm
- Height: 1050mm
- Wheelbase: 3010mm
- Engine: Gibson GK428 4.2 litre V8 mid-engined, longitudinally mounted
- Transmission: Xtrac P1159F 6-speed sequential semi-automatic paddle-shift
- Power: 603 hp (450 kW)
- Weight: 930kg
- Fuel: Various
- Lubricants: Various
- Brakes: Brembo Carbon Disks
- Tyres: Michelin, Dunlop, Goodyear

Competition history
- Notable entrants: Racing Team Nederland; Cetilar Villorba Corse; SMP Racing; Cetilar Racing; High Class Racing; Thunderhead Carlin Racing; AVF by Adrián Vallés
- Notable drivers: Matevos Isaakyan; Egor Orudzhev; Frits van Eerd; Jan Lammers; Andrea Belicchi; Roberto Lacorte; Giorgio Sernagiotto; Dennis Andersen; Anders Fjordbach; Henrique Chaves; Konstantin Tereshchenko; Viktor Shaytar; Felipe Nasr; Ben Barnicoat; Jack Manchester; Olivier Pla; Harry Tincknell; Harrison Newey; Giedo van der Garde; Nyck de Vries; Antonio Fuoco
- Debut: 2017 4 Hours of Silverstone
- First win: 2017 4 Hours of Le Castellet
- Last win: 2020 4 Hours of Buriram
- Last event: 2021 24 Hours of Daytona
Races	Wins	Podiums	Poles	F/Laps
39	3	9	2	0
- Teams' Championships: 0
- Constructors' Championships: 0
- Drivers' Championships: 0

The Dallara P217 is a sportscar prototype built by Dallara Automobili to the 2017 FIA/ACO regulations for the Le Mans Prototype LMP2 class. The car also meets the regulations for the Le Mans Prototype 2 Class of the IMSA WeatherTech Sportscar Championship. It was active in the FIA World Endurance Championship, the European Le Mans Series and Asian Le Mans Series. The prototype made its debut at the 2017 4 Hours of Silverstone.

== Development ==
The car is a result of the bid made by Dallara, for one of the four licenses to build the new for 2017 Le Mans Prototype 2 cars. It is also the first LMP constructed by Dallara since the original Audi R18 TDI. The car was first spotted testing at the Autodromo Riccardo Paletti in Northern Italy in late early October, by the Italian magazine Autosprint.

During the 2017 racing season, the car was discovered to have a fundamental issue with a critical element of the sprint kit which was firmly homologated and carried over in the Le Mans low-drag kit. Resulting in major balance issues for the car which first surfaced at Le Mans. With the car being noted for its speed on the long straights, such as the Mulsanne Straight, but also for its lack of pace in the twistier sections of the track. This element was later revealed to be the splitter. The car was subsequently fitted with an Evo kit for the 2018 racing season to resolve issues with the car. With a new splitter for the Standard High Downforce Aero package and a revised Le Mans Low Drag Kit. Ahead of the homologation of the Evo Package, the revised car was revealed to have undergone testing at the Algarve International Circuit, in the hands of customer team Cetilar Villorba Corse. The car has also been known for its relative similarity to the Porsche 919 Hybrid.

== Cadillac DPi-V.R ==
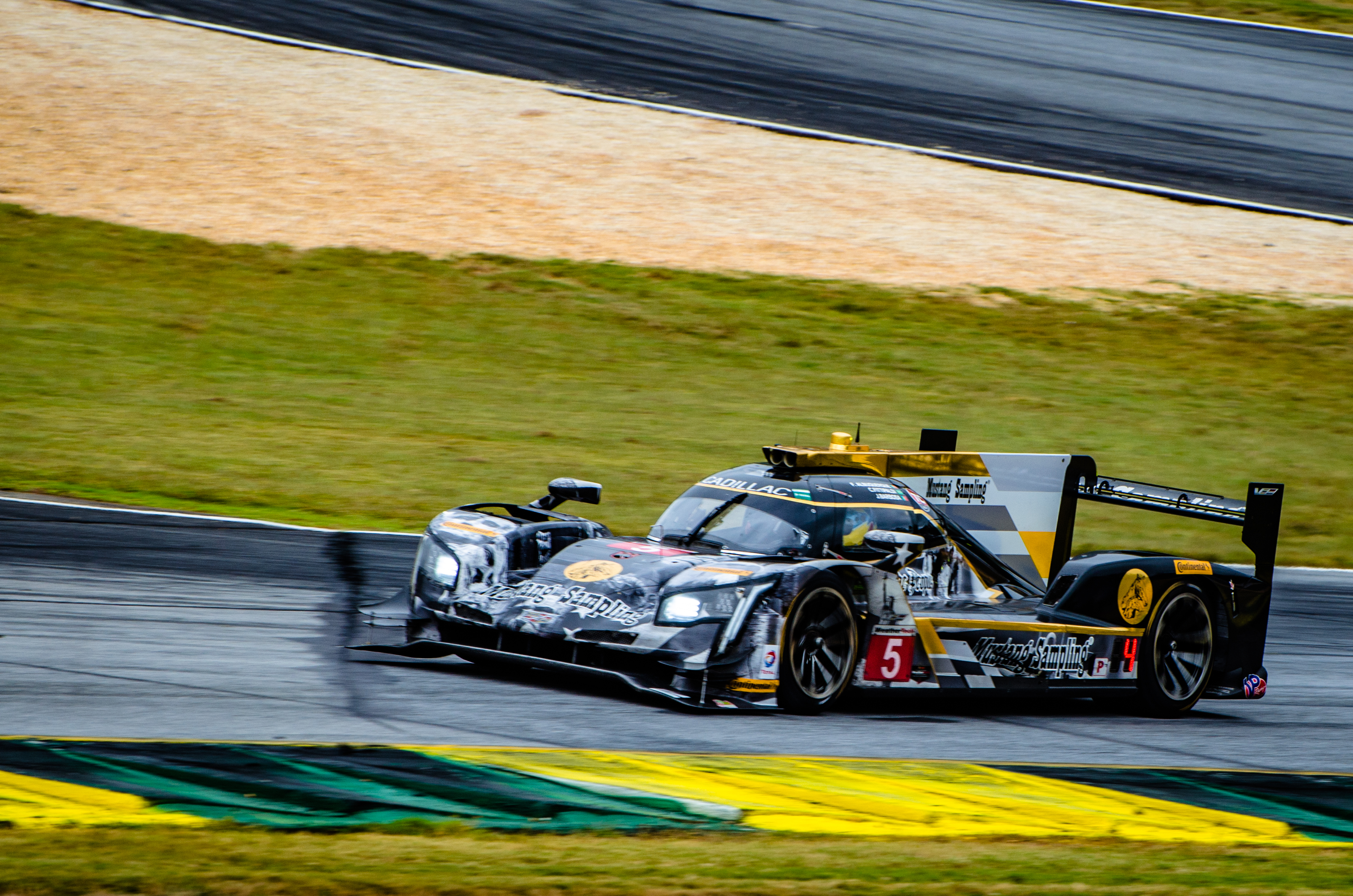
Action Express Racing's Mustang Sampling Racing Cadillac DPi- V.R. at the Petit Le Mans.

A Daytona Prototype International variant of the car, has been developed in partnership with General Motors (under its Cadillac marque), as well as Wayne Taylor Racing. It was unveiled on the 30th of November and is a successor to the successful Corvette Daytona Prototype that was fielded in the Grand-Am Rolex Sports Car Series, as well as the IMSA WeatherTech Sportscar Championship. It is powered by a LS based GM small-block engine, originally a 6.2L V8 designed, developed, and produced by ECR Engines, mated to a 6 Speed Xtrac transmission, producing 600 hp. In this guise, the car was extremely dominant, with the car winning on its debut at the 2017 Rolex 24 at Daytona, where Wayne Taylor Racing leading a 1–2 with Action Express Racing, while also winning 8 of the 10 races in the calendar. In 2018, the displacement of the LS engine was changed to 5.5L, again built by ECR Engines and producing 580 hp, following a series of BoP adjustments during 2017 to slow down the car the previous season, that had made the car hard to drive, with most notably a tall first and second gear mandated after the low-end torque became an advantage against the turbocharged four and six-cylinder engines.

== Complete IMSA SportsCar Championship results ==
Results in bold indicate pole position. Results in italics indicate fastest lap.

Year	Entrant	Class	Drivers	No.	1	2	3	4	5	6	7	8	9	10	11	Points	Pos
Year	Entrant	Class	Drivers	No.	DAY1	DAY2	SEB	MOH	BEL	WGL1	WGL2	ELK	LGA	LBH	ATL	Points	Pos
**2021**	(Italy) Cetilar Racing	LMP2	(Italy) Andrea Belicchi	47	6	6										**0**	**NC**
**2021**	(Italy) Cetilar Racing	LMP2	(Italy) Antonio Fuoco	47	6	6										**0**	**NC**
**2021**	(Italy) Cetilar Racing	LMP2	(Italy) Roberto Lacorte	47	6	6										**0**	**NC**
**2021**	(Italy) Cetilar Racing	LMP2	(Italy) Giorgio Sernagiotto	47	6	6										**0**	**NC**

== Complete FIA World Endurance Championship results ==
Results in bold indicate pole position. Results in italics indicate fastest lap.

Year	Entrant	Class	Drivers	No.	1	2	3	4	5	6	7	8	Points	Pos
Year	Entrant	Class	Drivers	No.	**SPA** **(Belgium)**	**LMS** **(France)**	**SIL** **(United Kingdom)**	**FUJ** **(Japan)**	**SHA** **(China)**	**SEB** **(United States)**	**SPA** **(Belgium)**	**LMS** **(France)**	Points	Pos
**2018–19**	(Netherlands) Racing Team Nederland	LMP2	(Netherlands) Giedo van der Garde	29	8	7	5	7	5	5	6	15	**85**	**6th**
**2018–19**	(Netherlands) Racing Team Nederland	LMP2	(Netherlands) Frits van Eerd	29	8	7	5	7	5	5	6	15	**85**	**6th**
**2018–19**	(Netherlands) Racing Team Nederland	LMP2	(Netherlands) Jan Lammers	29	8	7							**85**	**6th**
**2018–19**	(Netherlands) Racing Team Nederland	LMP2	(Netherlands) Nyck de Vries	29			5	7	5	5	6	15	**85**	**6th**
					**SIL** **(United Kingdom)**	**FUJ** **(Japan)**	**SHA** **(China)**	**BHR** **(Bahrain)**	**COTA** **(United States)**	**SPA** **(Belgium)**	**LMS** **(France)**	**BHR** **(Bahrain)**	Points	Pos
2019–20	(Italy) Cetilar Racing	LMP2	(Italy) Andrea Belicchi	47	6	7	7	9	8	5	10	6	**72**	**7th**
2019–20	(Italy) Cetilar Racing	LMP2	(Italy) Roberto Lacorte	47	6	7	7	9	8	5	10	6	**72**	**7th**
2019–20	(Italy) Cetilar Racing	LMP2	(Italy) Giorgio Sernagiotto	47	6	7	7	9	8	5	10	6	**72**	**7th**

== Complete European Le Mans Series results ==
Results in bold indicate pole position. Results in italics indicate fastest lap.

Year	Entrant	Class	Drivers	No.	1	2	3	4	5	6	Points	Pos
Year	Entrant	Class	Drivers	No.	**SIL** **(United Kingdom)**	**MNZ** **(Italy)**	**RBR** **(Austria)**	**LEC** **(France)**	**SPA** **(Belgium)**	**POR** **(Portugal)**	Points	Pos
**2017**	(Russia) SMP Racing	LMP2	(Russia) Matevos Isaakyan	27			6	1	3	3	**63**	**4th**
**2017**	(Russia) SMP Racing	LMP2	(Russia) Egor Orudzhev	27			6	1	3	3	**63**	**4th**
**2017**	(Netherlands) Racing Team Nederland	LMP2	(Netherlands) Frits van Eerd	29	11	10	7	12	11	8	**12.5**	**11th**
**2017**	(Netherlands) Racing Team Nederland	LMP2	(Netherlands) Jan Lammers	29	11	10	7	12	11	8	**12.5**	**11th**
**2017**	(Italy) Cetilar Villorba Corse	LMP2	(Italy) Andrea Belicchi	47	6	5	NC	10	7	5	**35**	**9th**
**2017**	(Italy) Cetilar Villorba Corse	LMP2	(Italy) Roberto Lacorte	47	6	5	NC	10	7	5	**35**	**9th**
**2017**	(Italy) Cetilar Villorba Corse	LMP2	(Italy) Giorgio Sernagiotto	47	6	5	NC	10	7	5	**35**	**9th**
**2017**	(Denmark) High Class Racing	LMP2	(Denmark) Dennis Andersen	49	3	3	8	9	8	7	**46**	**6th**
**2017**	(Denmark) High Class Racing	LMP2	(Denmark) Anders Fjordbach	49	3	3	8	9	8	7	**46**	**6th**
					**LEC** **(France)**	**MNZ** **(Italy)**	**RBR** **(Austria)**	**SIL** **(United Kingdom)**	**SPA** **(Belgium)**	**POR** **(Portugal)**	Points	Pos
**2018**	(Spain) AVF by Adrián Vallés	LMP2	(Portugal) Henrique Chaves	30	11	Ret	14	8	9	Ret	**6**	**15th**
**2018**	(Spain) AVF by Adrián Vallés	LMP2	(Russia) Konstantin Tereshchenko	30	11	Ret	14	8	9	Ret	**6**	**15th**
**2018**	(Russia) SMP Racing	LMP2	(Russia) Matevos Isaakyan	35	NC	Ret	7	Ret			**6**	**14th**
**2018**	(Russia) SMP Racing	LMP2	(Russia) Egor Orudzhev	35	NC	Ret	7				**6**	**14th**
**2018**	(Russia) SMP Racing	LMP2	(Russia) Viktor Shaytar	35	NC	Ret	7	Ret			**6**	**14th**
**2018**	(Italy) Cetilar Villorba Corse	LMP2	(Italy) Andrea Belicchi	47	14						**4.5**	**17th**
**2018**	(Italy) Cetilar Villorba Corse	LMP2	(Italy) Roberto Lacorte	47	14	9	11	13	10	11	**4.5**	**17th**
**2018**	(Italy) Cetilar Villorba Corse	LMP2	(Italy) Giorgio Sernagiotto	47	14	9	11	13	10	11	**4.5**	**17th**
**2018**	(Italy) Cetilar Villorba Corse	LMP2	(Brazil) Felipe Nasr	47		9	11	13	10	11	**4.5**	**17th**
**2018**	(Denmark) High Class Racing	LMP2	(Denmark) Dennis Andersen	49	13	14	12	9	Ret	9	**5.5**	**16th**
**2018**	(Denmark) High Class Racing	LMP2	(Denmark) Anders Fjordbach	49	13	14	12	9	Ret	9	**5.5**	**16th**
					**LEC** **(France)**	**MNZ** **(Italy)**	**BAR** **(Spain)**	**SIL** **(United Kingdom)**	**SPA** **(Belgium)**	**POR** **(Portugal)**	Points	Pos
**2019**	(United Kingdom) Thunderhead Carlin Racing	LMP2	(United Kingdom) Ben Barnicoat	45	11	11	9	Ret		Ret	**3**	**16th**
**2019**	(United Kingdom) Thunderhead Carlin Racing	LMP2	(United Kingdom) Jack Manchester	45	11	11	9			Ret	**3**	**16th**
**2019**	(United Kingdom) Thunderhead Carlin Racing	LMP2	(France) Olivier Pla	45	11						**3**	**16th**
**2019**	(United Kingdom) Thunderhead Carlin Racing	LMP2	(United Kingdom) Harry Tincknell	45		11	9	Ret		Ret	**3**	**16th**
**2019**	(United Kingdom) Thunderhead Carlin Racing	LMP2	(United Kingdom) Harrison Newey	45				Ret			**3**	**16th**
**2019**	(Italy) Cetilar Villorba Corse	LMP2	(Italy) Andrea Belicchi	47		Ret					**0**	**NC**
**2019**	(Italy) Cetilar Villorba Corse	LMP2	(Italy) Roberto Lacorte	47		Ret					**0**	**NC**
**2019**	(Italy) Cetilar Villorba Corse	LMP2	(Italy) Giorgio Sernagiotto	47		Ret					**0**	**NC**

== Complete Asian Le Mans Series results ==
Results in bold indicate pole position. Results in italics indicate fastest lap.

Year	Entrant	Class	Drivers	No.	1	2	3	4	Points	Pos
Year	Entrant	Class	Drivers	No.	**(China)**; **SHA**	**(Australia)**; **BEN**	**(Malaysia)**; **SEP**	**(Thailand)**; **CHA**	Points	Pos
**2019–20**	(United Kingdom) Thunderhead Carlin Racing	LMP2	(United Kingdom) Ben Barnicoat	45	3	**3**	1	**1**	**82**	**2nd**
**2019–20**	(United Kingdom) Thunderhead Carlin Racing	LMP2	(United Kingdom) Jack Manchester	45	3	**3**	1	**1**	**82**	**2nd**
**2019–20**	(United Kingdom) Thunderhead Carlin Racing	LMP2	(United Kingdom) Harry Tincknell	45	3	**3**	1	**1**	**82**	**2nd**

The pole positions at the 2020 4 Hours of The Bend and the 2020 4 Hours of Buriram were the Dallara P217's only ever pole positions in LMP2 competition.

== See also ==
- BR Engineering BR1 (Dallara-based LMP1 chassis)
- Cadillac DPi-V.R (Dallara-based DPi chassis)
