= Gibson GK428 engine =

Gibson GK428

Overview
- Manufacturer: (United Kingdom) Gibson
- Production: 2017–present

Layout
- Configuration: Naturally-aspirated 90° V8
- Displacement: 4.2 L (256 cu in)
- Valvetrain: DOHC

RPM range
- Max. engine speed: 9,000 RPM

Combustion
- Fuel system: Electronic indirect multi-point injection
- Management: Cosworth
- Fuel type: Elf LMS 102 RON unleaded gasoline; E10 ethanol

Output
- Power output: 603 hp (450 kW)
- Torque output: 410 lb⋅ft (556 N⋅m)

Dimensions
- Dry weight: 135 kg (298 lb)

Chronology
- Predecessor: Zytek ZG348
- Successor: Gibson GL458

The Gibson GK428 engine is a 4.2-litre normally-aspirated DOHC V8 engine. It has been developed and produced by Gibson Technology for sports car racing since 2017.

== Development ==
The engine had been in development since August 2015, prior to being selected as the sole engine supplier for all of the new 2017 regulation LMP2 cars. It shares some architecture with the Zytek ZG348 engine, which previously powered multiple LMP2 cars. The engine has a target for the running costs of about $1,400 per hour, which was tested to last for 50 hours or 8,000 km (5,000 mi) on average. During the 2024 4 Hours of Mugello, the engine reached 5,000,000 km (3,106,856 mi) of running since it was introduced.

== Applications ==
- Dallara P217
- Ligier JS P217
- Oreca 07
- Riley-Multimatic MkXXX
