= Norma M30 =

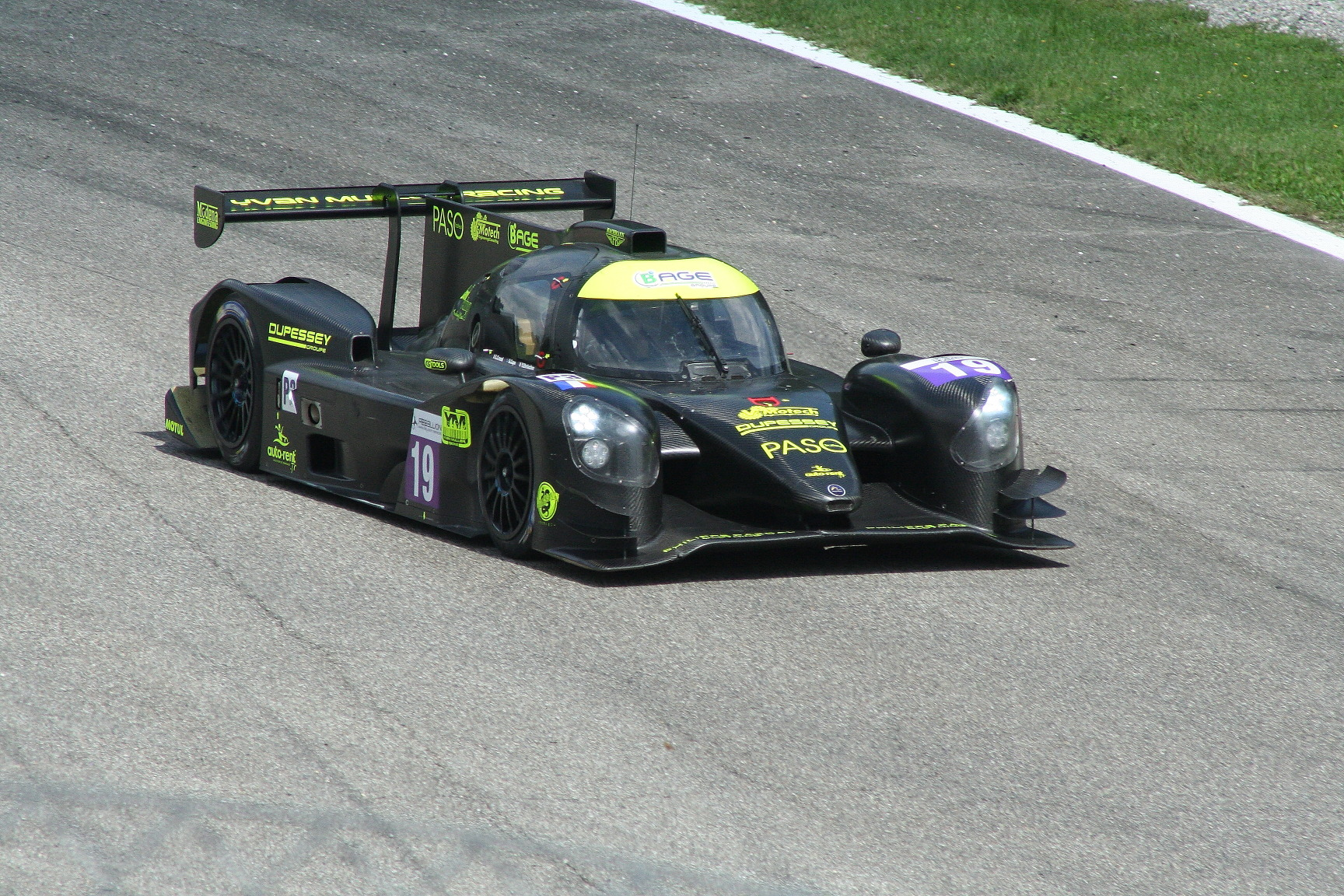
- Category: LMP3
- Constructor: Norma Auto Concept
- Designer: Norbert Santos
- Successor: Duqueine D08

Technical specifications
- Chassis: carbon fiber monocoque
- Suspension (front): Double wishbone Öhlins TTx dampers
- Suspension (rear): Double wishbone Öhlins TTx dampers
- Length: 460 cm (460.0 cm)
- Width: 190 cm (190.0 cm)
- Height: 110 cm (110.0 cm)
- Wheelbase: 290 cm (290.0 cm)
- Engine: Nissan VK50VE - power 420 Hp - torque 550 Nm 5,000 cc (305.1 cu in) V8
- Transmission: Xtrac six-speed Sequential manual transmission
- Weight: 900 kg (1,984.2 lb)

Competition history
- Notable entrants: (Luxembourg) DKR Engineering (France) Duqueine Engineering (Italy) Oregon Team (France) M.Racing - YMR (France) Ultimate (United States) Conquest Racing (United States) JDC MotorSports
- Debut: 2017 IMSA Prototype Challenge round 1
- Last event: 2021 IMSA Prototype Challenge Round 6
Races	Wins	Titles
101	31	2017 Le Mans Cup; 2018 Le Mans Cup; 2019 Le Mans Cup; 2017 IMSA Prototype Challenge; 2019 IMSA Prototype Challenge; 2021 IMSA Prototype Challenge LMP3-2

The Norma M30 is an LMP3-spec sports prototype. The car is built by French constructor Norma Auto Concept and designed by company co-founder Norbert Santos. The Norma M30 won the 2017 Michelin Le Mans Cup in its debut year entered by DKR Engineering.

== History ==
=== Development ===
The LMP3 class was launched by the Automobile Club de l'Ouest (ACO) in 2015. Five constructors were selected by the ACO to build chassis for the class. Besides Norma, ADESS, Ginetta, Ligier and Riley were selected. Ligier, ADESS and Ginetta launched their cars during the late 2015 and 2016 seasons. Norma launched their LMP3 prototype in February 2017. Nissan was appointed as the sole engine provider. The Nissan VK50VE engine produces 420hp. The engine was previously used in road going vehicles such as the Infiniti QX70. Romain Dumas tested the M30 at Nogaro and Pau Arnos.

=== Competition history ===
American driver Colin Thompson was the driver for the M30's racing debut. Thompson, racing with Kelly-Moss Road and Race, raced the car at Sebring International Raceway during the 12 Hours of Sebring weekend. After a troubled first race, Thompson finished second in the second race. The Norma M30 was only beaten by a Ligier JS P3, raced by Nico Jamin.

In Europe the car competed in the 2017 European Le Mans Series, 2017 Michelin Le Mans Cup and other national series. Erwin Creed and Ricky Capo won the 2017 4 Hours of Monza with the Norma, entered by M.Racing-YMR. In the Michelin Le Mans Cup, a supporting series to the European Le Mans Series, the LMP3 cars were the fastest on track. DKR Engineering, with Jean Glorieux and Alexander Toril, won three straight races. The team won also at Le Mans, Red Bull Ring and Circuit de Spa-Francorchamps.
