= 2017 4 Hours of Spa-Francorchamps =

Layout of Circuit de Spa-Francorchamps

The 2017 4 Hours of Spa-Francorchamps was an endurance motor race held at Circuit de Spa-Francorchamps in Stavelot, Belgium on 23–24 September 2017. It was the fifth round of the 2017 European Le Mans Series.

== Race ==
=== Race result ===
Class winners in bold.

Pos	Class	No.	Team	Drivers	Chassis	Tyre	Laps
Pos	Class	No.	Team	Drivers	Engine	Tyre	Laps
1	**LMP2**	**40**	**(France) Graff**	**(Australia) James Allen** **(United Kingdom) Richard Bradley** **(Colombia) Gustavo Yacamán**	**Oreca 07**	D	**97**
1	**LMP2**	**40**	**(France) Graff**	**(Australia) James Allen** **(United Kingdom) Richard Bradley** **(Colombia) Gustavo Yacamán**	**Gibson GK428 4.2 L V8**	D	**97**
2	LMP2	22	(Russia) G-Drive Racing	(Mexico) Memo Rojas (France) Léo Roussel (Japan) Ryō Hirakawa	Oreca 07	D	97
2	LMP2	22	(Russia) G-Drive Racing	(Mexico) Memo Rojas (France) Léo Roussel (Japan) Ryō Hirakawa	Gibson GK428 4.2 L V8	D	97
3	LMP2	27	(Russia) SMP Racing	(Russia) Matevos Isaakyan (Russia) Matevos Isaakyan	Dallara P217	D	97
3	LMP2	27	(Russia) SMP Racing	(Russia) Matevos Isaakyan (Russia) Matevos Isaakyan	Gibson GK428 4.2 L V8	D	97
4	LMP2	32	(United States) United Autosports	(Portugal) Filipe Albuquerque (United States) William Owen (Switzerland) Hugo de Sadeleer	Ligier JS P217	D	97
4	LMP2	32	(United States) United Autosports	(Portugal) Filipe Albuquerque (United States) William Owen (Switzerland) Hugo de Sadeleer	Gibson GK428 4.2 L V8	D	97
5	LMP2	21	(United States) DragonSpeed	(United Kingdom) Ben Hanley (Sweden) Henrik Hedman (France) Nicolas Lapierre	Oreca 07	D	97
5	LMP2	21	(United States) DragonSpeed	(United Kingdom) Ben Hanley (Sweden) Henrik Hedman (France) Nicolas Lapierre	Gibson GK428 4.2 L V8	D	97
6	LMP2	39	(France) Graff	(France) Enzo Guibbert (France) Paul Petit (Switzerland) Jonathan Hirschi	Oreca 07	D	97
6	LMP2	39	(France) Graff	(France) Enzo Guibbert (France) Paul Petit (Switzerland) Jonathan Hirschi	Gibson GK428 4.2 L V8	D	97
7	LMP2	47	(Italy) Cetilar Villorba Corse	(Italy) Andrea Belicchi (Italy) Roberto Lacorte (Italy) Giorgio Sernagiotto	Dallara P217	D	97
7	LMP2	47	(Italy) Cetilar Villorba Corse	(Italy) Andrea Belicchi (Italy) Roberto Lacorte (Italy) Giorgio Sernagiotto	Gibson GK428 4.2 L V8	D	97
8	LMP2	49	(Denmark) High Class Racing	(Denmark) Dennis Andersen (Denmark) Anders Fjordbach	Dallara P217	D	96
8	LMP2	49	(Denmark) High Class Racing	(Denmark) Dennis Andersen (Denmark) Anders Fjordbach	Gibson GK428 4.2 L V8	D	96
9	LMP2	23	(France) Panis Barthez Competition	(France) Fabien Barthez (France) Timothé Buret (France) Nathanaël Berthon	Ligier JS P217	MI	96
9	LMP2	23	(France) Panis Barthez Competition	(France) Fabien Barthez (France) Timothé Buret (France) Nathanaël Berthon	Gibson GK428 4.2 L V8	MI	96
10	LMP2	28	(France) IDEC Sport Racing	(France) Patrice Lafargue (France) Paul Lafargue (France) Paul-Loup Chatin	Ligier JS P217	MI	96
10	LMP2	28	(France) IDEC Sport Racing	(France) Patrice Lafargue (France) Paul Lafargue (France) Paul-Loup Chatin	Gibson GK428 4.2 L V8	MI	96
11	LMP2	29	(Netherlands) Racing Team Nederland	(Netherlands) Frits van Eerd (Netherlands) Jan Lammers	Dallara P217	D	94
11	LMP2	29	(Netherlands) Racing Team Nederland	(Netherlands) Frits van Eerd (Netherlands) Jan Lammers	Gibson GK428 4.2 L V8	D	94
12	**LMP3**	**9**	**(Austria) AT Racing**	**(Belarus) Alexander Talkanitsa, Jr.** **(Belarus) Alexander Talkanitsa, Sr.** **(Denmark) Mikkel Jensen**	**Ligier JS P3**	MI	**92**
12	**LMP3**	**9**	**(Austria) AT Racing**	**(Belarus) Alexander Talkanitsa, Jr.** **(Belarus) Alexander Talkanitsa, Sr.** **(Denmark) Mikkel Jensen**	**Nissan VK50 5.0 L V8**	MI	**92**
13	LMP3	7	(France) Duqueine Engineering	(Switzerland) Antonin Borga (Switzerland) David Droux (France) Nicolas Schatz	Norma M30	MI	91
13	LMP3	7	(France) Duqueine Engineering	(Switzerland) Antonin Borga (Switzerland) David Droux (France) Nicolas Schatz	Nissan VK50 5.0 L V8	MI	91
14	LMP3	2	(United States) United Autosports	(United States) John Falb (United States) Sean Rayhall	Ligier JS P3	MI	91
14	LMP3	2	(United States) United Autosports	(United States) John Falb (United States) Sean Rayhall	Nissan VK50 5.0 L V8	MI	91
15	LMP3	13	(Poland) Inter Europol Competition	(Germany) Martin Hippe (Poland) Jakub Śmiechowski	Ligier JS P3	MI	91
15	LMP3	13	(Poland) Inter Europol Competition	(Germany) Martin Hippe (Poland) Jakub Śmiechowski	Nissan VK50 5.0 L V8	MI	91
16	LMP3	3	(United States) United Autosports	(United Kingdom) Christian England (United Kingdom) Wayne Boyd (United States) Mark Patterson	Ligier JS P3	MI	91
16	LMP3	3	(United States) United Autosports	(United Kingdom) Christian England (United Kingdom) Wayne Boyd (United States) Mark Patterson	Nissan VK50 5.0 L V8	MI	91
17	LMP3	18	(France) M.Racing - YMR	(France) Alexandre Cougnaud (France) Antoine Jung (France) Romano Ricci	Ligier JS P3	MI	91
17	LMP3	18	(France) M.Racing - YMR	(France) Alexandre Cougnaud (France) Antoine Jung (France) Romano Ricci	Nissan VK50 5.0 L V8	MI	91
18	LMP3	6	(United Kingdom) 360 Racing	(United Kingdom) Ross Kaiser (United Kingdom) Anthony Wells (United Kingdom) Terrence Woodward	Ligier JS P3	MI	91
18	LMP3	6	(United Kingdom) 360 Racing	(United Kingdom) Ross Kaiser (United Kingdom) Anthony Wells (United Kingdom) Terrence Woodward	Nissan VK50 5.0 L V8	MI	91
19	LMP3	17	(France) Ultimate	(France) François Hériau (France) Jean-Baptiste Lahaye (France) Matthieu Lahaye	Ligier JS P3	MI	91
19	LMP3	17	(France) Ultimate	(France) François Hériau (France) Jean-Baptiste Lahaye (France) Matthieu Lahaye	Nissan VK50 5.0 L V8	MI	91
20	**GTE**	**51**	**(Switzerland) Spirit of Race**	**(Italy) Andrea Bertolini** **(Italy) Rino Mastronardi** **(Italy) Giorgio Roda**	**Ferrari 488 GTE**	D	**91**
20	**GTE**	**51**	**(Switzerland) Spirit of Race**	**(Italy) Andrea Bertolini** **(Italy) Rino Mastronardi** **(Italy) Giorgio Roda**	**Ferrari F154CB 3.9 L Turbo V8**	D	**91**
21	GTE	66	(United Kingdom) JMW Motorsport	(United Kingdom) Jody Fannin (United Kingdom) Robert Smith (United Kingdom) Will Stevens	Ferrari 458 Italia GT2	D	90
21	GTE	66	(United Kingdom) JMW Motorsport	(United Kingdom) Jody Fannin (United Kingdom) Robert Smith (United Kingdom) Will Stevens	Ferrari 4.5 L V8	D	90
22	GTE	99	(United Kingdom) Beechdean AMR	(United Kingdom) Andrew Howard (United Kingdom) Ross Gunn (United Kingdom) Darren Turner	Aston Martin Vantage GTE	D	90
22	GTE	99	(United Kingdom) Beechdean AMR	(United Kingdom) Andrew Howard (United Kingdom) Ross Gunn (United Kingdom) Darren Turner	Aston Martin 4.5 L V8	D	90
23	LMP3	15	(United Kingdom) RLR MSport	(Denmark) Morten Dons (Canada) John Farano (United Kingdom) Alex Kapadia	Ligier JS P3	MI	90
23	LMP3	15	(United Kingdom) RLR MSport	(Denmark) Morten Dons (Canada) John Farano (United Kingdom) Alex Kapadia	Nissan VK50 5.0 L V8	MI	90
24	GTE	55	(Switzerland) Spirit of Race	(United Kingdom) Duncan Cameron (Republic of Ireland) Matt Griffin (United Kingdom) Aaron Scott	Ferrari 488 GTE	D	90
24	GTE	55	(Switzerland) Spirit of Race	(United Kingdom) Duncan Cameron (Republic of Ireland) Matt Griffin (United Kingdom) Aaron Scott	Ferrari F154CB 3.9 L Turbo V8	D	90
25	LMP3	10	(Italy) Oregon Team	(Italy) Dario Capitanio (Colombia) Andrés Méndez (Italy) Davide Roda	Norma M30	MI	90
25	LMP3	10	(Italy) Oregon Team	(Italy) Dario Capitanio (Colombia) Andrés Méndez (Italy) Davide Roda	Nissan VK50 5.0 L V8	MI	90
26	LMP3	12	(United States) Eurointernational	(Italy) Andrea Dromedari (Australia) Ricky Capo (United States) Max Hanratty	Ligier JS P3	MI	89
26	LMP3	12	(United States) Eurointernational	(Italy) Andrea Dromedari (Australia) Ricky Capo (United States) Max Hanratty	Nissan VK50 5.0 L V8	MI	89
27	LMP3	4	(France) Cool Racing by GPC	(Switzerland) Iradj Alexander (Switzerland) Alexandre Coigny	Ligier JS P3	MI	89
27	LMP3	4	(France) Cool Racing by GPC	(Switzerland) Iradj Alexander (Switzerland) Alexandre Coigny	Nissan VK50 5.0 L V8	MI	89
28	LMP3	8	(France) Duqueine Engineering	(France) Vincent Beltoise (France) Nicolas Melin (Switzerland) Lucas Légeret	Norma M30	MI	88
28	LMP3	8	(France) Duqueine Engineering	(France) Vincent Beltoise (France) Nicolas Melin (Switzerland) Lucas Légeret	Nissan VK50 5.0 L V8	MI	88
29	GTE	90	(United Kingdom) TF Sport	(United Kingdom) Euan Hankey (Denmark) Nicki Thiim (Turkey) Salih Yoluc	Aston Martin Vantage GTE	D	88
29	GTE	90	(United Kingdom) TF Sport	(United Kingdom) Euan Hankey (Denmark) Nicki Thiim (Turkey) Salih Yoluc	Aston Martin 4.5 L V8	D	88
30	GTE	77	(Germany) Proton Competition	(Italy) Matteo Cairoli (Switzerland) Joël Camathias (Germany) Christian Ried	Porsche 911 RSR	D	70
30	GTE	77	(Germany) Proton Competition	(Italy) Matteo Cairoli (Switzerland) Joël Camathias (Germany) Christian Ried	Porsche 4.0 L Flat-6	D	70
DNF	LMP3	19	(France) M.Racing - YMR	(Australia) Neale Muston (France) Yann Ehrlacher	Ligier JS P3	MI	52
DNF	LMP3	19	(France) M.Racing - YMR	(Australia) Neale Muston (France) Yann Ehrlacher	Nissan VK50 5.0 L V8	MI	52
DNF	LMP3	11	(United States) Eurointernational	(Italy) Giorgio Mondini (Italy) Marco Jacoboni	Ligier JS P3	MI	46
DNF	LMP3	11	(United States) Eurointernational	(Italy) Giorgio Mondini (Italy) Marco Jacoboni	Nissan VK50 5.0 L V8	MI	46
DNF	LMP3	16	(France) Panis Barthez Competition	(France) Eric Debard (France) Simon Gachet (United States) Theo Bean	Ligier JS P3	MI	45
DNF	LMP3	16	(France) Panis Barthez Competition	(France) Eric Debard (France) Simon Gachet (United States) Theo Bean	Nissan VK50 5.0 L V8	MI	45
DNF	LMP3	5	(Spain) By Speed Factory	(Germany) Jürgen Krebs (Switzerland) Tim Müller	Ligier JS P3	MI	32
DNF	LMP3	5	(Spain) By Speed Factory	(Germany) Jürgen Krebs (Switzerland) Tim Müller	Nissan VK50 5.0 L V8	MI	32
DNF	LMP2	25	(Portugal) Algarve Pro Racing	(France) Julien Canal (Mexico) Memo Rojas (France) Nathanaël Berthon	Ligier JS P217	D	25
DNF	LMP2	25	(Portugal) Algarve Pro Racing	(France) Julien Canal (Mexico) Memo Rojas (France) Nathanaël Berthon	Gibson GK428 4.2 L V8	D	25

European Le Mans Series
Previous race: Le Castellet	2017 season	Next race: Portimão
