= 2017 European Le Mans Series =

Car racing series

The 2017 European Le Mans Series season was the fourteenth season of the Automobile Club de l'Ouest's (ACO) European Le Mans Series. The six-event season began at Silverstone Circuit, in conjunction with the FIA World Endurance Championship, on 15 April, and ended at Algarve International Circuit on 22 October.

== Regulations ==
The 2017 season saw new regulations regarding the LMP2 class introduced. Teams were able to choose from four different chassis constructors: Dallara, Onroak Automotive (Ligier), Oreca and a joint venture between Riley Technologies/Multimatic. Gibson Technology was the exclusive engine supplier for the class, with all cars equipped with a 4.2-litre, normally-aspirated V8 engine, producing approximately 600hp. Cosworth Electronics was also the exclusive electronics supplier.

The aim of the new regulations was to ensure long-term success for the category with a reduction in costs and the guarantee of stable regulations.

== Calendar ==
The 2017 calendar was announced on 23 September 2016. The calendar comprised six events, featuring the same four circuits that hosted events in 2016. For the first time since 2008 and 2010, it included events at Monza and Algarve, respectively, which were stand-alone events. For the fifth consecutive season, Silverstone hosted the opening rounds of both the European Le Mans Series and the FIA World Endurance Championship.

| Rnd | Race | Circuit | Location | Date |
|---|---|---|---|---|
| 1 | 4 Hours of Silverstone | (United Kingdom) Silverstone Circuit | Silverstone, United Kingdom | 15 April |
| 2 | 4 Hours of Monza | (Italy) Autodromo Nazionale di Monza | Monza, Italy | 14 May |
| 3 | 4 Hours of Red Bull Ring | (Austria) Red Bull Ring | Spielberg, Austria | 23 July |
| 4 | 4 Hours of Le Castellet | (France) Circuit Paul Ricard | Le Castellet, France | 27 August |
| 5 | 4 Hours of Spa | (Belgium) Circuit de Spa-Francorchamps | Spa, Belgium | 24 September |
| 6 | 4 Hours of Portimão | (Portugal) Algarve International Circuit | Portimão, Portugal | 22 October |

== Entry list ==
The provisional entry list was announced on 2 February 2017.

=== LMP2 ===
In accordance with the new LMP2 regulations for 2017, all cars utilised the Gibson GK428 4.2 L V8 engine.

| Entrant/team | Chassis | Tyre | No. | Drivers | Rounds |
|---|---|---|---|---|---|
| (United States) DragonSpeed | Oreca 07 | D | 21 | (United Kingdom) Ben Hanley | All |
| (United States) DragonSpeed | Oreca 07 | D | 21 | (Sweden) Henrik Hedman | All |
| (United States) DragonSpeed | Oreca 07 | D | 21 | (France) Nicolas Lapierre | All |
| (Russia) G-Drive Racing | Oreca 07 | D | 22 | (Mexico) Memo Rojas | All |
| (Russia) G-Drive Racing | Oreca 07 | D | 22 | (France) Léo Roussel | All |
| (Russia) G-Drive Racing | Oreca 07 | D | 22 | (Japan) Ryō Hirakawa | 1–2, 5–6 |
| (Russia) G-Drive Racing | Oreca 07 | D | 22 | (France) Nicolas Minassian | 3–4 |
| (France) Panis Barthez Competition | Ligier JS P217 | M | 23 | (France) Fabien Barthez | All |
| (France) Panis Barthez Competition | Ligier JS P217 | M | 23 | (France) Timothé Buret | All |
| (France) Panis Barthez Competition | Ligier JS P217 | M | 23 | (France) Nathanaël Berthon | 1, 3–6 |
| (Portugal) Algarve Pro Racing | Ligier JS P217 | D | 25 | (United States) Matt McMurry | All |
| (Portugal) Algarve Pro Racing | Ligier JS P217 | D | 25 | (France) Andrea Pizzitola | All |
| (Portugal) Algarve Pro Racing | Ligier JS P217 | D | 25 | (Italy) Andrea Roda | All |
| (Russia) SMP Racing | Dallara P217 | D | 27 | (Russia) Matevos Isaakyan | 3–6 |
| (Russia) SMP Racing | Dallara P217 | D | 27 | (Russia) Egor Orudzhev | 3–6 |
| (France) IDEC Sport Racing | Ligier JS P217 | M | 28 | (France) Patrice Lafargue | All |
| (France) IDEC Sport Racing | Ligier JS P217 | M | 28 | (France) Paul Lafargue | All |
| (France) IDEC Sport Racing | Ligier JS P217 | M | 28 | (France) David Zollinger | 1 |
| (France) IDEC Sport Racing | Ligier JS P217 | M | 28 | (France) Olivier Pla | 2–4 |
| (France) IDEC Sport Racing | Ligier JS P217 | M | 28 | (France) Paul-Loup Chatin | 5–6 |
| (Netherlands) Racing Team Nederland | Dallara P217 | D | 29 | (Netherlands) Frits van Eerd | All |
| (Netherlands) Racing Team Nederland | Dallara P217 | D | 29 | (Netherlands) Jan Lammers | All |
| (United States) United Autosports | Ligier JS P217 | D | 32 | (Portugal) Filipe Albuquerque | All |
| (United States) United Autosports | Ligier JS P217 | D | 32 | (United States) William Owen | All |
| (United States) United Autosports | Ligier JS P217 | D | 32 | (Switzerland) Hugo de Sadeleer | All |
| (United Kingdom) Tockwith Motorsports | Ligier JS P217 | D | 34 | (United Kingdom) Phil Hanson | 1–3 |
| (United Kingdom) Tockwith Motorsports | Ligier JS P217 | D | 34 | (United Kingdom) Nigel Moore | 1–3 |
| (France) Graff | Oreca 07 | D | 39 | (France) Enzo Guibbert | All |
| (France) Graff | Oreca 07 | D | 39 | (France) Paul Petit | All |
| (France) Graff | Oreca 07 | D | 39 | (France) Eric Trouillet | 1–4 |
| (France) Graff | Oreca 07 | D | 39 | (Switzerland) Jonathan Hirschi | 5 |
| (France) Graff | Oreca 07 | D | 39 | (Mexico) Ricardo Sánchez | 6 |
| (France) Graff | Oreca 07 | D | 40 | (Australia) James Allen | All |
| (France) Graff | Oreca 07 | D | 40 | (United Kingdom) Richard Bradley | All |
| (France) Graff | Oreca 07 | D | 40 | (France) Franck Matelli | 1–2 |
| (France) Graff | Oreca 07 | D | 40 | (Colombia) Gustavo Yacamán | 3–6 |
| (Italy) Cetilar Villorba Corse | Dallara P217 | D | 47 | (Italy) Andrea Belicchi | All |
| (Italy) Cetilar Villorba Corse | Dallara P217 | D | 47 | (Italy) Roberto Lacorte | All |
| (Italy) Cetilar Villorba Corse | Dallara P217 | D | 47 | (Italy) Giorgio Sernagiotto | All |
| (Denmark) High Class Racing | Dallara P217 | D | 49 | (Denmark) Dennis Andersen | All |
| (Denmark) High Class Racing | Dallara P217 | D | 49 | (Denmark) Anders Fjordbach | All |

=== LMP3 ===
All cars utilised the Nissan VK50VE 5.0 L V8 engine and Michelin tyres.

| Entrant/team | Chassis | No. | Drivers | Rounds |
|---|---|---|---|---|
| (United States) United Autosports | Ligier JS P3 | 2 | (United States) John Falb | All |
| (United States) United Autosports | Ligier JS P3 | 2 | (United States) Sean Rayhall | All |
| (United States) United Autosports | Ligier JS P3 | 3 | (United Kingdom) Wayne Boyd | All |
| (United States) United Autosports | Ligier JS P3 | 3 | (United Kingdom) Christian England | All |
| (United States) United Autosports | Ligier JS P3 | 3 | (United States) Mark Patterson | All |
| (France) Cool Racing by GPC | Ligier JS P3 | 4 | (Switzerland) Iradj Alexander | All |
| (France) Cool Racing by GPC | Ligier JS P3 | 4 | (Switzerland) Gino Forgione | 1–2 |
| (France) Cool Racing by GPC | Ligier JS P3 | 4 | (Switzerland) Alexandre Coigny | 2–6 |
| (Spain) By Speed Factory | Ligier JS P3 | 5 | (Germany) Jürgen Krebs | All |
| (Spain) By Speed Factory | Ligier JS P3 | 5 | (Switzerland) Tim Müller | 1–5 |
| (Spain) By Speed Factory | Ligier JS P3 | 5 | (Estonia) Tristan Viidas | 1–3 |
| (Spain) By Speed Factory | Ligier JS P3 | 5 | (Russia) Timur Boguslavskiy | 6 |
| (Spain) By Speed Factory | Ligier JS P3 | 5 | (Switzerland) Giorgio Maggi | 6 |
| (United Kingdom) 360 Racing | Ligier JS P3 | 6 | (United Kingdom) Ross Kaiser | All |
| (United Kingdom) 360 Racing | Ligier JS P3 | 6 | (United Kingdom) Anthony Wells | All |
| (United Kingdom) 360 Racing | Ligier JS P3 | 6 | (United Kingdom) Terrence Woodward | All |
| (France) Duqueine Engineering | Ligier JS P3 1–2; Norma M30 3–6 | 7 | (Switzerland) Antonin Borga | All |
| (France) Duqueine Engineering | Ligier JS P3 1–2; Norma M30 3–6 | 7 | (Switzerland) David Droux | All |
| (France) Duqueine Engineering | Ligier JS P3 1–2; Norma M30 3–6 | 7 | (France) Nicolas Schatz | All |
| (France) Duqueine Engineering | Ligier JS P3 1–3; Norma M30 4–6 | 8 | (France) Vincent Beltoise | All |
| (France) Duqueine Engineering | Ligier JS P3 1–3; Norma M30 4–6 | 8 | (France) Henry Hassid | 1–2 |
| (France) Duqueine Engineering | Ligier JS P3 1–3; Norma M30 4–6 | 8 | (Switzerland) Lucas Légeret | 2–6 |
| (France) Duqueine Engineering | Ligier JS P3 1–3; Norma M30 4–6 | 8 | (Sweden) Douglas Lundberg | 3 |
| (France) Duqueine Engineering | Ligier JS P3 1–3; Norma M30 4–6 | 8 | (France) Nicolas Melin | 4–6 |
| (Austria) AT Racing | Ligier JS P3 | 9 | (Belarus) Alexander Talkanitsa, Jr. | All |
| (Austria) AT Racing | Ligier JS P3 | 9 | (Belarus) Alexander Talkanitsa, Sr. | All |
| (Austria) AT Racing | Ligier JS P3 | 9 | (Denmark) Mikkel Jensen | 1, 3–6 |
| (Austria) AT Racing | Ligier JS P3 | 9 | (Italy) Maurizio Mediani | 2 |
| (Italy) Oregon Team | Norma M30 | 10 | (Italy) Dario Capitanio | All |
| (Italy) Oregon Team | Norma M30 | 10 | (Colombia) Andrés Méndez | All |
| (Italy) Oregon Team | Norma M30 | 10 | (Italy) Davide Roda | All |
| (United States) Eurointernational | Ligier JS P3 | 11 | (Italy) Giorgio Mondini | All |
| (United States) Eurointernational | Ligier JS P3 | 11 | (Italy) Davide Uboldi | 1–3 |
| (United States) Eurointernational | Ligier JS P3 | 11 | (Italy) Marco Jacoboni | 4–5 |
| (United States) Eurointernational | Ligier JS P3 | 11 | (Italy) Andrea Dromedari | 6 |
| (United States) Eurointernational | Ligier JS P3 | 12 | (Italy) Andrea Dromedari | 1–5 |
| (United States) Eurointernational | Ligier JS P3 | 12 | (United States) Max Hanratty | 1–2, 4–6 |
| (United States) Eurointernational | Ligier JS P3 | 12 | (France) Maxime Pialat | 1–2 |
| (United States) Eurointernational | Ligier JS P3 | 12 | (Australia) Ricky Capo | 3–6 |
| (United States) Eurointernational | Ligier JS P3 | 12 | (Canada) James Dayson | 3, 6 |
| (Poland) Inter Europol Competition | Ligier JS P3 | 13 | (Germany) Martin Hippe | All |
| (Poland) Inter Europol Competition | Ligier JS P3 | 13 | (Poland) Jakub Śmiechowski | All |
| (United Kingdom) RLR MSport | Ligier JS P3 | 15 | (Denmark) Morten Dons | All |
| (United Kingdom) RLR MSport | Ligier JS P3 | 15 | (Canada) John Farano | All |
| (United Kingdom) RLR MSport | Ligier JS P3 | 15 | (United Kingdom) Alex Kapadia | All |
| (France) Panis Barthez Competition | Ligier JS P3 | 16 | (United States) Theo Bean | All |
| (France) Panis Barthez Competition | Ligier JS P3 | 16 | (France) Eric Debard | All |
| (France) Panis Barthez Competition | Ligier JS P3 | 16 | (France) Simon Gachet | All |
| (France) Ultimate | Ligier JS P3 | 17 | (France) François Hériau | All |
| (France) Ultimate | Ligier JS P3 | 17 | (France) Jean-Baptiste Lahaye | All |
| (France) Ultimate | Ligier JS P3 | 17 | (France) Matthieu Lahaye | All |
| (France) M.Racing - YMR | Ligier JS P3 | 18 | (France) Alexandre Cougnaud | All |
| (France) M.Racing - YMR | Ligier JS P3 | 18 | (France) Antoine Jung | All |
| (France) M.Racing - YMR | Ligier JS P3 | 18 | (France) Romano Ricci | All |
| (France) M.Racing - YMR | Norma M30 | 19 | (France) Erwin Creed | 1–4, 6 |
| (France) M.Racing - YMR | Norma M30 | 19 | (Australia) Ricky Capo | 1–2 |
| (France) M.Racing - YMR | Norma M30 | 19 | (France) Yann Ehrlacher | 1, 3–6 |
| (France) M.Racing - YMR | Norma M30 | 19 | (Australia) Neale Muston | 5 |

=== LMGTE ===
All teams used Dunlop tyres.

| Entrant/Team | Car | Engine | No. | Drivers | Rounds |
|---|---|---|---|---|---|
| (France) Larbre Compétition | Chevrolet Corvette C7.R | Chevrolet LT5.5 5.5 L V8 | 50 | (France) Romain Brandela | 2 |
| (France) Larbre Compétition | Chevrolet Corvette C7.R | Chevrolet LT5.5 5.5 L V8 | 50 | (France) Christian Philippon | 2 |
| (France) Larbre Compétition | Chevrolet Corvette C7.R | Chevrolet LT5.5 5.5 L V8 | 50 | (Brazil) Fernando Rees | 2 |
| (Switzerland) Spirit of Race | Ferrari 488 GTE | Ferrari F154CB 4.0 L Turbo V8 | 51 | (Italy) Andrea Bertolini | All |
| (Switzerland) Spirit of Race | Ferrari 488 GTE | Ferrari F154CB 4.0 L Turbo V8 | 51 | (Italy) Gianluca Roda | 1–4, 6 |
| (Switzerland) Spirit of Race | Ferrari 488 GTE | Ferrari F154CB 4.0 L Turbo V8 | 51 | (Italy) Giorgio Roda | All |
| (Switzerland) Spirit of Race | Ferrari 488 GTE | Ferrari F154CB 4.0 L Turbo V8 | 51 | (Italy) Rino Mastronardi | 5 |
| (Switzerland) Spirit of Race | Ferrari 488 GTE | Ferrari F154CB 4.0 L Turbo V8 | 55 | (United Kingdom) Duncan Cameron | All |
| (Switzerland) Spirit of Race | Ferrari 488 GTE | Ferrari F154CB 4.0 L Turbo V8 | 55 | (Republic of Ireland) Matt Griffin | All |
| (Switzerland) Spirit of Race | Ferrari 488 GTE | Ferrari F154CB 4.0 L Turbo V8 | 55 | (United Kingdom) Aaron Scott | All |
| (United Kingdom) JMW Motorsport | Ferrari 458 Italia GT2 1–2; Ferrari 488 GTE 3–6 | Ferrari F136 4.5 L V8 1–2; Ferrari F154CB 4.0 L Turbo V8 3–6 | 66 | (United Kingdom) Jody Fannin | All |
| (United Kingdom) JMW Motorsport | Ferrari 458 Italia GT2 1–2; Ferrari 488 GTE 3–6 | Ferrari F136 4.5 L V8 1–2; Ferrari F154CB 4.0 L Turbo V8 3–6 | 66 | (United Kingdom) Robert Smith | All |
| (United Kingdom) JMW Motorsport | Ferrari 458 Italia GT2 1–2; Ferrari 488 GTE 3–6 | Ferrari F136 4.5 L V8 1–2; Ferrari F154CB 4.0 L Turbo V8 3–6 | 66 | (United Kingdom) Rory Butcher | 1 |
| (United Kingdom) JMW Motorsport | Ferrari 458 Italia GT2 1–2; Ferrari 488 GTE 3–6 | Ferrari F136 4.5 L V8 1–2; Ferrari F154CB 4.0 L Turbo V8 3–6 | 66 | (United Kingdom) Jonny Cocker | 2–4 |
| (United Kingdom) JMW Motorsport | Ferrari 458 Italia GT2 1–2; Ferrari 488 GTE 3–6 | Ferrari F136 4.5 L V8 1–2; Ferrari F154CB 4.0 L Turbo V8 3–6 | 66 | (United Kingdom) Will Stevens | 5–6 |
| (Germany) Proton Competition | Porsche 911 RSR (2016) | Porsche M97/74 4.0 L Flat-6 | 77 | (Italy) Matteo Cairoli | All |
| (Germany) Proton Competition | Porsche 911 RSR (2016) | Porsche M97/74 4.0 L Flat-6 | 77 | (Switzerland) Joël Camathias | All |
| (Germany) Proton Competition | Porsche 911 RSR (2016) | Porsche M97/74 4.0 L Flat-6 | 77 | (Germany) Christian Ried | All |
| (United Kingdom) TF Sport | Aston Martin Vantage GTE | Aston Martin AM05 4.5 L V8 | 90 | (United Kingdom) Euan Hankey | All |
| (United Kingdom) TF Sport | Aston Martin Vantage GTE | Aston Martin AM05 4.5 L V8 | 90 | (Denmark) Nicki Thiim | All |
| (United Kingdom) TF Sport | Aston Martin Vantage GTE | Aston Martin AM05 4.5 L V8 | 90 | (Turkey) Salih Yoluc | All |
| (United Kingdom) Beechdean AMR | Aston Martin Vantage GTE | Aston Martin AM05 4.5 L V8 | 99 | (United Kingdom) Andrew Howard | All |
| (United Kingdom) Beechdean AMR | Aston Martin Vantage GTE | Aston Martin AM05 4.5 L V8 | 99 | (United Kingdom) Darren Turner | All |
| (United Kingdom) Beechdean AMR | Aston Martin Vantage GTE | Aston Martin AM05 4.5 L V8 | 99 | (United Kingdom) Ross Gunn | 1–5 |
| (United Kingdom) Beechdean AMR | Aston Martin Vantage GTE | Aston Martin AM05 4.5 L V8 | 99 | (Germany) Immanuel Vinke | 6 |

== Results and standings ==
=== Race results ===
Bold indicates overall winner.

| Rnd. | Circuit | LMP2 winning team | LMP3 winning team | GTE winning team | Results |
| Rnd. | Circuit | LMP2 winning drivers | LMP3 winning drivers | GTE winning drivers | Results |
|---|---|---|---|---|---|
| 1 | Silverstone | (United States) **No. 32 United Autosports** | (United States) No. 2 United Autosports | (United Kingdom) No. 90 TF Sport | Report |
| 1 | Silverstone | (Portugal) **Filipe Albuquerque** **(United States) William Owen** **(Switzerland) Hugo de Sadeleer** | (United States) John Falb (United States) Sean Rayhall | (United Kingdom) Euan Hankey (Denmark) Nicki Thiim (Turkey) Salih Yoluc | Report |
| 2 | Monza | **(Russia) No. 22 G-Drive Racing** | (France) No. 19 M.Racing - YMR | (United Kingdom) No. 66 JMW Motorsport | Report |
| 2 | Monza | **(Japan) Ryō Hirakawa** **(Mexico) Memo Rojas** **(France) Léo Roussel** | (Australia) Ricky Capo (France) Erwin Creed | (United Kingdom) Jonny Cocker (United Kingdom) Jody Fannin (United Kingdom) Robert Smith | Report |
| 3 | Red Bull Ring | (United States) **No. 32 United Autosports** | (United States) No. 11 Eurointernational | (Switzerland) No. 55 Spirit of Race | Report |
| 3 | Red Bull Ring | (Portugal) **Filipe Albuquerque** **(United States) William Owen** **(Switzerland) Hugo de Sadeleer** | (Italy) Giorgio Mondini (Italy) Davide Uboldi | (United Kingdom) Duncan Cameron (Republic of Ireland) Matt Griffin (United Kingdom) Aaron Scott | Report |
| 4 | Paul Ricard | **(Russia) No. 27 SMP Racing** | (United States) No. 2 United Autosports | (Switzerland) No. 55 Spirit of Race | Report |
| 4 | Paul Ricard | **(Russia) Matevos Isaakyan** **(Russia) Egor Orudzhev** | (United States) John Falb (United States) Sean Rayhall | (United Kingdom) Duncan Cameron (Republic of Ireland) Matt Griffin (United Kingdom) Aaron Scott | Report |
| 5 | Spa-Francorchamps | **(France) No. 40 Graff** | (Austria) No. 9 AT Racing | (Switzerland) No. 51 Spirit of Race | Report |
| 5 | Spa-Francorchamps | **(Australia) James Allen** **(United Kingdom) Richard Bradley** **(Colombia) Gustavo Yacamán** | (Denmark) Mikkel Jensen (Belarus) Alexander Talkanitsa, Jr. (Belarus) Alexander Talkanitsa, Sr. | (Italy) Andrea Bertolini (Italy) Giorgio Roda (Italy) Rino Mastronardi | Report |
| 6 | Portimão | **(France) No. 40 Graff** | (United States) No. 3 United Autosports | (Germany) No. 77 Proton Competition | Report |
| 6 | Portimão | **(Australia) James Allen** **(United Kingdom) Richard Bradley** **(Colombia) Gustavo Yacamán** | (United Kingdom) Wayne Boyd (United Kingdom) Christian England (United States) Mark Patterson | (Italy) Matteo Cairoli (Switzerland) Joël Camathias (Germany) Christian Ried | Report |

To be classified, a car had to cross the finish line on the racetrack when the chequered flag was shown, except in a case of force majeure at the Stewards' discretion, and must have covered at least 70% (the official number of laps would be rounded down to the nearest whole number) of the distance covered by the car classified in first place in the overall classification.

== Teams Championships ==
Points are awarded according to the following structure:

| Position | **1st** | **2nd** | **3rd** | **4th** | **5th** | **6th** | **7th** | **8th** | **9th** | **10th** | Other | **Pole** |
| Points | 25 | 18 | 15 | 12 | 10 | 8 | 6 | 4 | 2 | 1 | 0.5 | 1 |

=== LMP2 Teams Championship ===
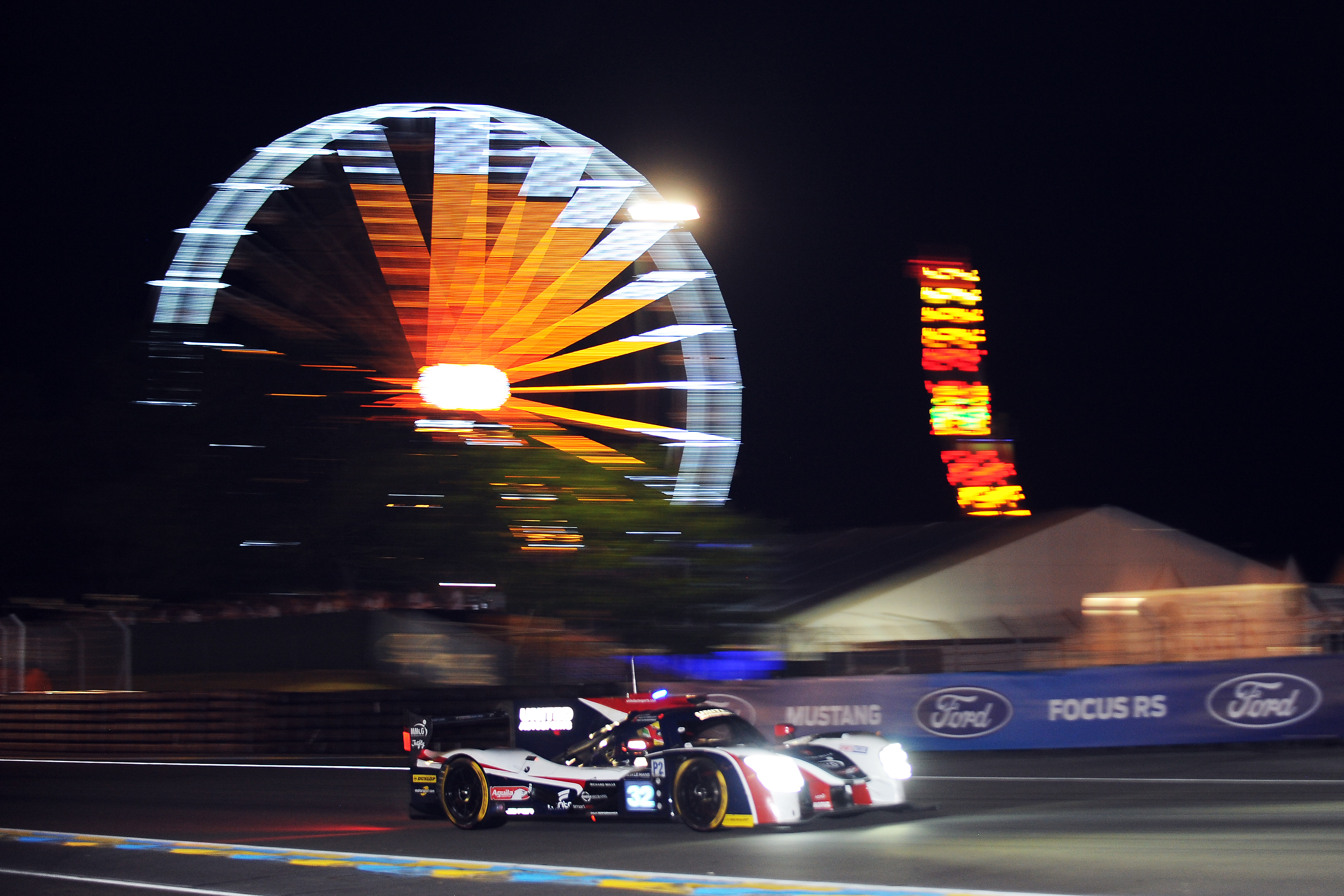
United Autosports Ligier JS P217

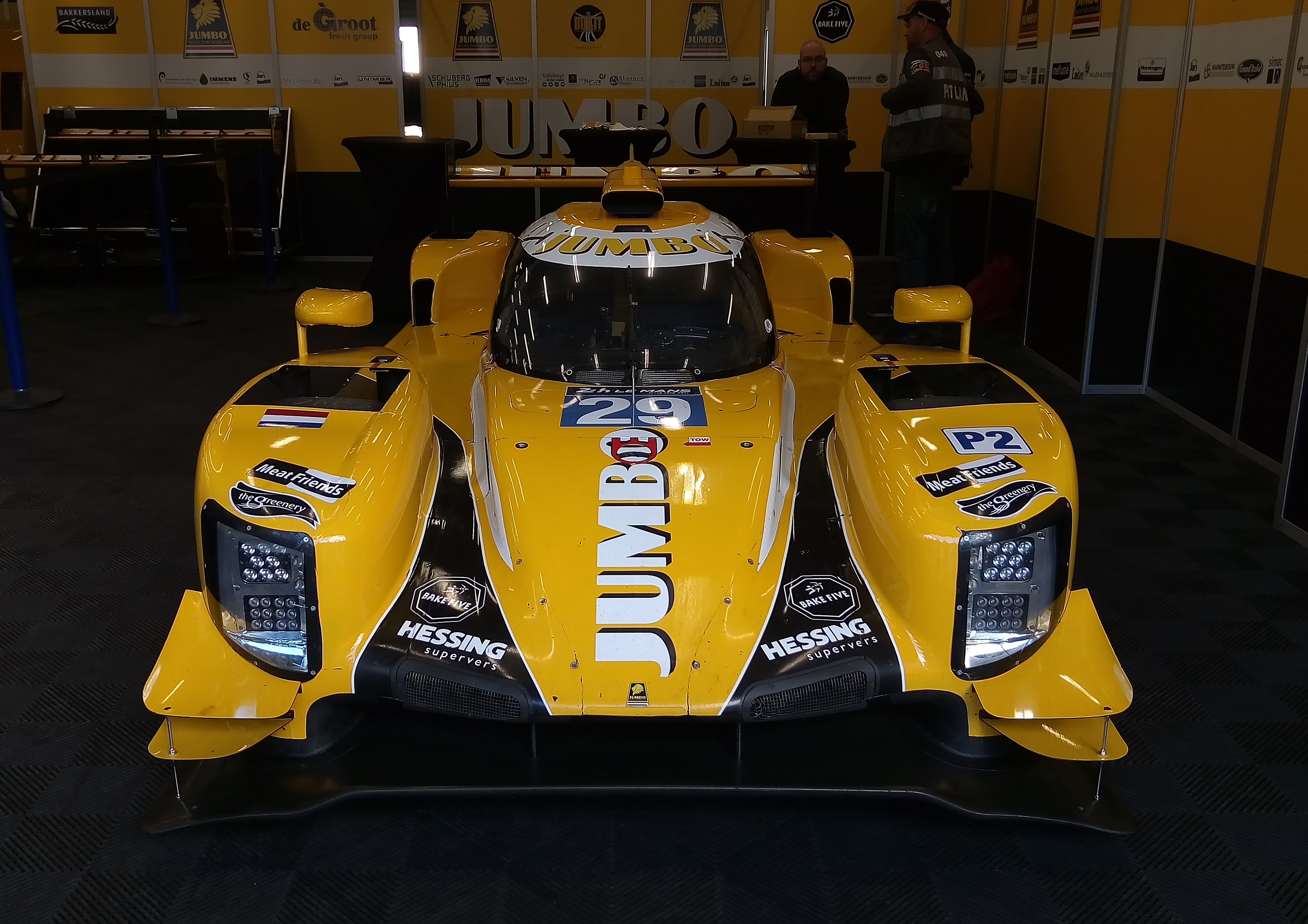
Racing Team Nederland Dallara P217

| Pos. | Team | Car | SIL (United Kingdom) | MNZ (Italy) | RBR (Austria) | LEC (France) | SPA (Belgium) | POR (Portugal) | Total |
|---|---|---|---|---|---|---|---|---|---|
| 1 | (Russia) No. 22 G-Drive Racing | Oreca 07 | 2 | 1 | **2** | 2 | 2 | 4 | 110 |
| 2 | (United States) No. 32 United Autosports | Ligier JS P217 | 1 | 6 | 1 | 5 | 4 | 2 | 98 |
| 3 | (France) No. 40 Graff | Oreca 07 | 4 | 8 | 4 | 6 | 1 | 1 | 86 |
| 4 | (Russia) No. 27 SMP Racing | Dallara P217 | | | 6 | 1 | 3 | 3 | 63 |
| 5 | (France) No. 39 Graff | Oreca 07 | 7 | **4** | 3 | 3 | 6 | NC | 57 |
| 6 | (Denmark) No. 49 High Class Racing | Dallara P217 | 3 | 3 | 8 | 9 | 8 | 7 | 46 |
| 7 | (France) No. 23 Panis Barthez Competition | Ligier JS P217 | 9 | 7 | 5 | 4 | 9 | **6** | 41 |
| 8 | (United States) No. 21 DragonSpeed | Oreca 07 | **10** | 2 | NC | **7** | **5** | 10 | 39 |
| 9 | (Italy) No. 47 Cetilar Villorba Corse | Dallara P217 | 6 | 5 | NC | 10 | 7 | 5 | 35 |
| 10 | (United Kingdom) No. 34 Tockwith Motorsports | Ligier JS P217 | 5 | 11 | 9 | | | | 12.5 |
| 11 | (Netherlands) No. 29 Racing Team Nederland | Dallara P217 | 11 | 10 | 7 | 12 | 11 | 8 | 12.5 |
| 12 | (France) No. 28 IDEC Sport Racing | Ligier JS P217 | 8 | 9 | Ret | 11 | 10 | 9 | 8.5 |
| 13 | (Portugal) No. 25 Algarve Pro Racing | Ligier JS P217 | Ret | NC | NC | 8 | Ret | 11 | 4.5 |
| Pos. | Team | Car | SIL (United Kingdom) | MNZ (Italy) | RBR (Austria) | LEC (France) | SPA (Belgium) | POR (Portugal) | Total |

Key
| Colour | Result |
|---|---|
| Gold | Race winner |
| Silver | 2nd place |
| Bronze | 3rd place |
| Green | Points finish |
| Blue | Non-points finish |
| Blue | Non-classified finish (NC) |
| Purple | Did not finish (Ret) |
| Black | Disqualified (DSQ) |
| Black | Excluded (EX) |
| White | Did not start (DNS) |
| White | Race cancelled (C) |
| White | Withdrew (WD) |
| Blank | Did not participate |

**Bold** – Pole
Italics – Fastest lap

=== LMP3 Teams Championship ===
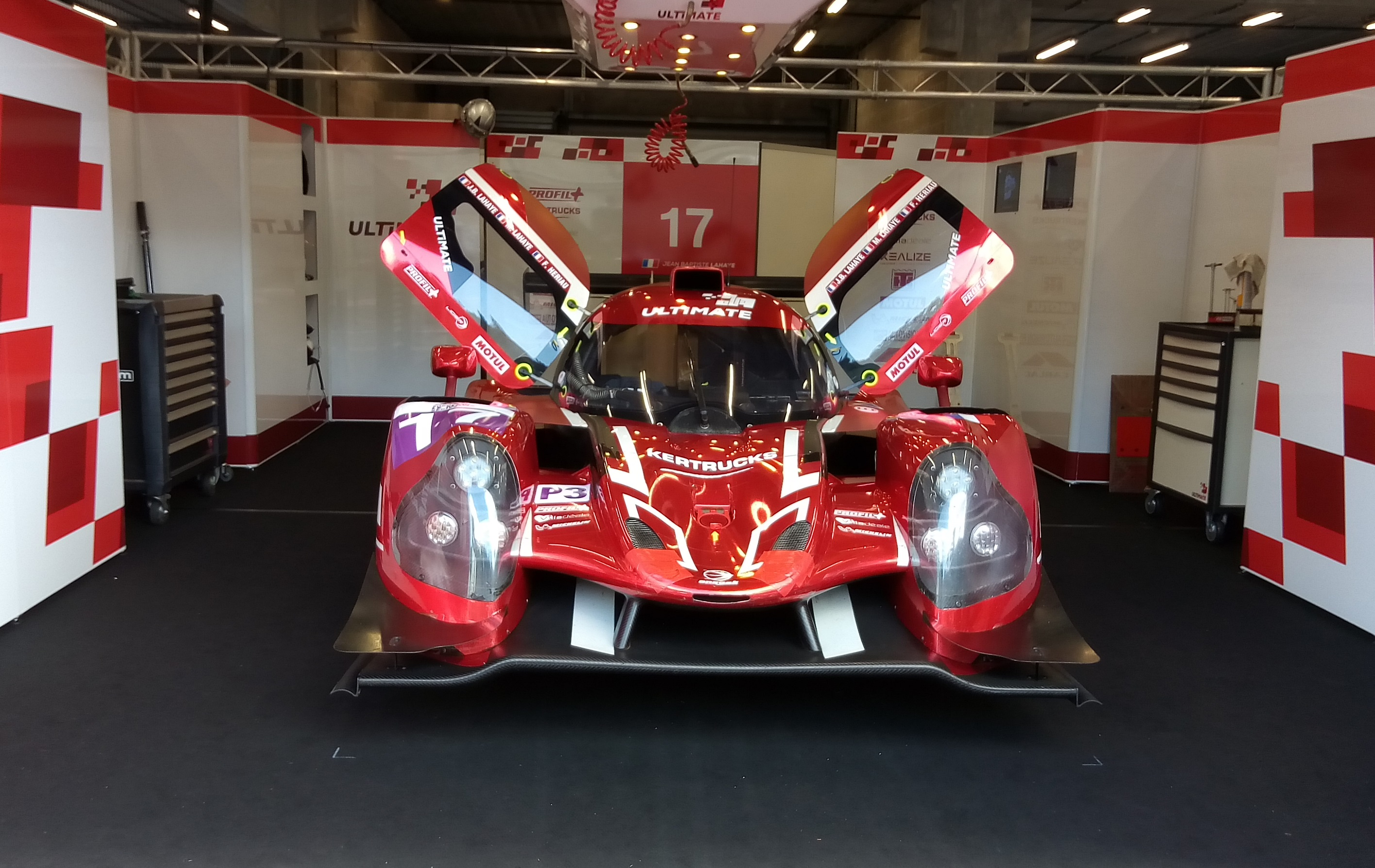
No.17 Ultimate Ligier JS P3

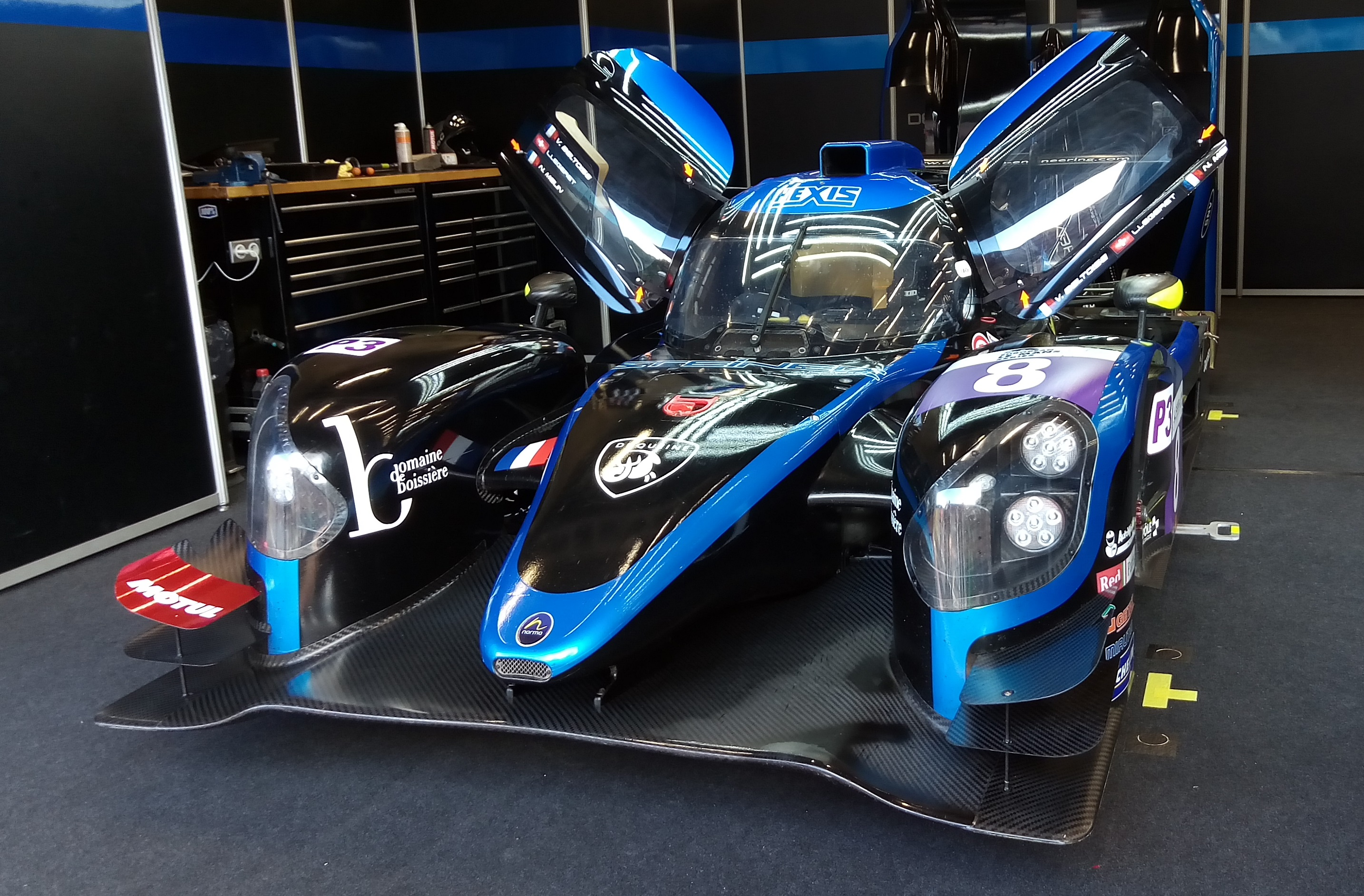
No. 8 Duqueine Engineering Norma M30

| Pos. | Team | Car | SIL (United Kingdom) | MNZ (Italy) | RBR (Austria) | LEC (France) | SPA (Belgium) | POR (Portugal) | Total |
|---|---|---|---|---|---|---|---|---|---|
| 1 | (United States) No. 2 United Autosports | Ligier JS P3 | 1 | 9 | 2 | 1 | 3 | 2 | 103 |
| 2 | (France) No. 18 M.Racing - YMR | Ligier JS P3 | 5 | 2 | 3 | 3 | 6 | 3 | 81 |
| 3 | (United States) No. 3 United Autosports | Ligier JS P3 | 3 | **4** | Ret | Ret | 5 | 1 | 63 |
| 4 | (France) No. 17 Ultimate | Ligier JS P3 | 2 | 3 | 4 | 6 | 8 | 8 | 61 |
| 5 | (Poland) No. 13 Inter Europol Competition | Ligier JS P3 | 6 | 6 | 5 | 2 | 4 | Ret | 56 |
| 6 | (Austria) No. 9 AT Racing | Ligier JS P3 | **4** | Ret | 6 | Ret | **1** | **7** | 54 |
| 7 | (United States) No. 11 Eurointernational | Ligier JS P3 | Ret | 5 | 1 | 4 | Ret | 9 | 49 |
| 8 | (France) No. 7 Duqueine Engineering | Ligier JS P3 | 11 | 8 | | | | | 37.5 |
| 8 | (France) No. 7 Duqueine Engineering | Norma M30 | | | **9** | Ret | 2 | 4 | 37.5 |
| 9 | (United Kingdom) No. 6 360 Racing | Ligier JS P3 | 7 | 7 | Ret | **NC** | 7 | 5 | 29 |
| 10 | (France) No. 19 M.Racing - YMR | Norma M30 | 10 | 1 | Ret | NC | Ret | Ret | 26 |
| 11 | (United Kingdom) No. 15 RLR MSport | Ligier JS P3 | 8 | 10 | 8 | 7 | 9 | 6 | 25 |
| 12 | (France) No. 16 Panis Barthez Competition | Ligier JS P3 | 9 | 11 | Ret | 5 | Ret | Ret | 12.5 |
| 13 | (Italy) No. 10 Oregon Team | Norma M30 | 13 | 15 | 7 | NC | 10 | Ret | 8 |
| 14 | (United States) No. 12 Eurointernational | Ligier JS P3 | 12 | 12 | Ret | 8 | 11 | Ret | 5.5 |
| 15 | (Spain) No. 5 By Speed Factory | Ligier JS P3 | 15 | 16 | 10 | 9 | Ret | 12 | 4.5 |
| 16 | (France) No. 4 Cool Racing by GPC | Ligier JS P3 | 14 | 14 | NC | 10 | 12 | 11 | 3 |
| 17 | (France) No. 8 Duqueine Engineering | Ligier JS P3 | Ret | 13 | | | | | 2.5 |
| 17 | (France) No. 8 Duqueine Engineering | Norma M30 | | | 11 | NC | 13 | 10 | 2.5 |
| Pos. | Team | Car | SIL (United Kingdom) | MNZ (Italy) | RBR (Austria) | LEC (France) | SPA (Belgium) | POR (Portugal) | Total |

Key
| Colour | Result |
|---|---|
| Gold | Race winner |
| Silver | 2nd place |
| Bronze | 3rd place |
| Green | Points finish |
| Blue | Non-points finish |
| Blue | Non-classified finish (NC) |
| Purple | Did not finish (Ret) |
| Black | Disqualified (DSQ) |
| Black | Excluded (EX) |
| White | Did not start (DNS) |
| White | Race cancelled (C) |
| White | Withdrew (WD) |
| Blank | Did not participate |

**Bold** – Pole
Italics – Fastest lap

=== LMGTE Teams Championship ===
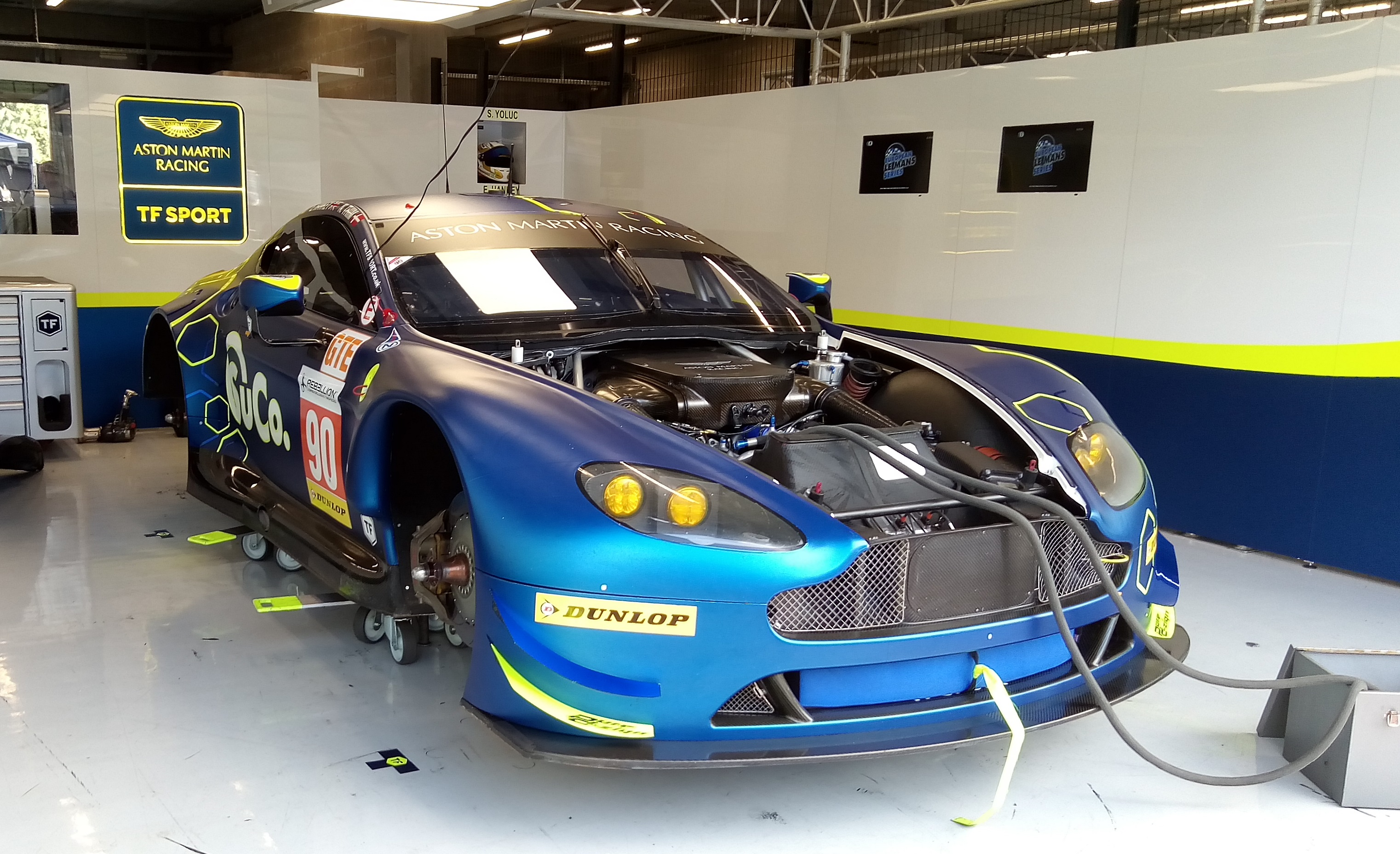
The TF Sport Aston Martin in the pitbox before the 2017 4 Hours of Spa

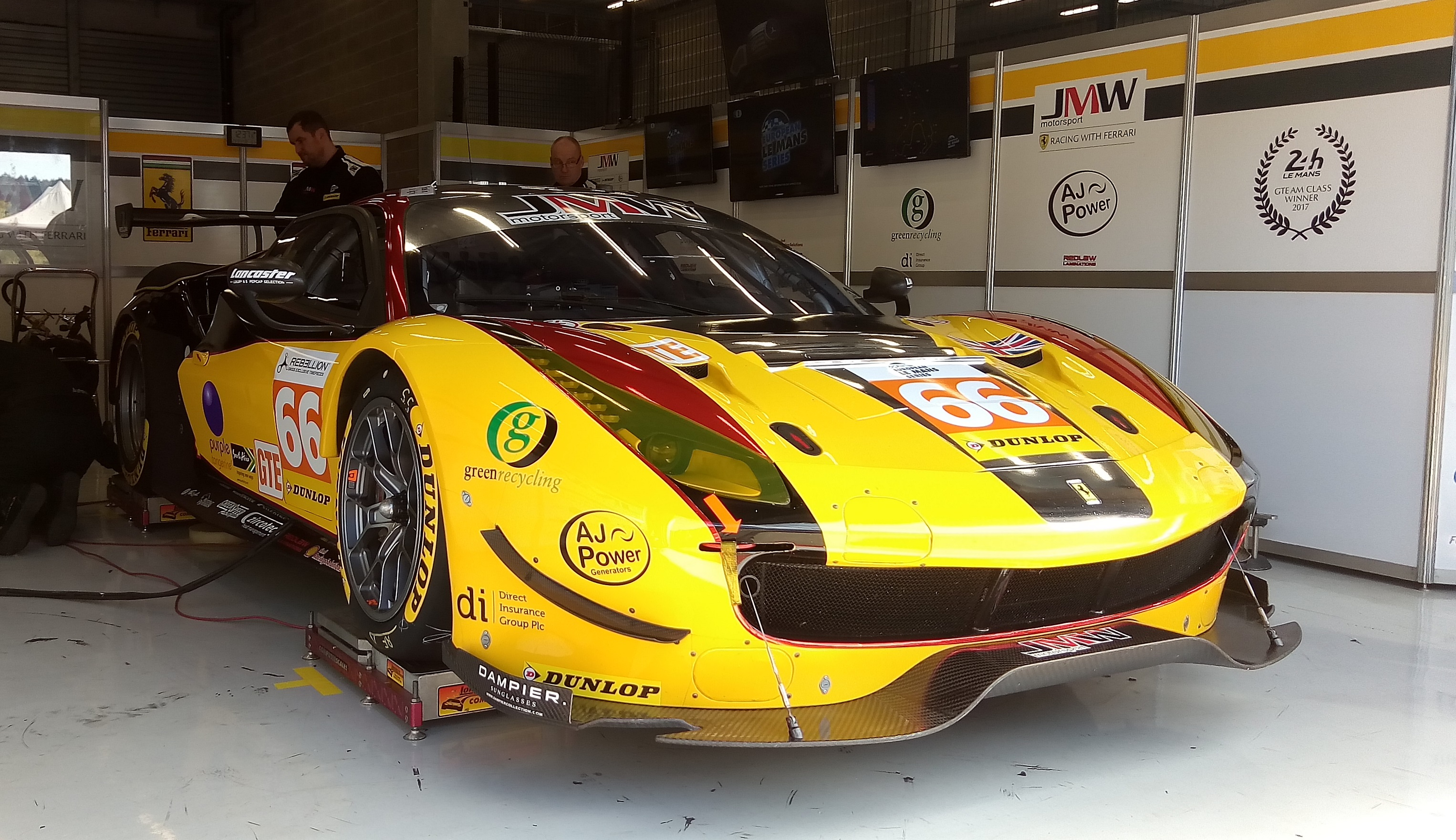
The JMW Motorsport Ferrari in the pitbox before the 2017 4 Hours of Spa

| Pos. | Team | Car | SIL (United Kingdom) | MNZ (Italy) | RBR (Austria) | LEC (France) | SPA (Belgium) | POR (Portugal) | Total |
|---|---|---|---|---|---|---|---|---|---|
| 1 | (United Kingdom) No. 66 JMW Motorsport | Ferrari 458 Italia GT2 | 5 | 1 | | | | | 104 |
| 1 | (United Kingdom) No. 66 JMW Motorsport | Ferrari 488 GTE | | | 2 | 3 | 2 | 2 | 104 |
| 2 | (United Kingdom) No. 90 TF Sport | Aston Martin Vantage GTE | **1** | 2 | 3 | 2 | 5 | 3 | 102 |
| 3 | (Germany) No. 77 Proton Competition | Porsche 911 RSR (2016) | 2 | 5 | 5 | 6 | **6** | 1 | 80 |
| 4 | (Switzerland) No. 55 Spirit Of Race | Ferrari 488 GTE | 4 | **Ret** | 1 | **1** | 4 | **Ret** | 77 |
| 5 | (United Kingdom) No. 99 Beechdean AMR | Aston Martin Vantage GTE | 3 | 3 | 6 | 5 | 3 | 4 | 75 |
| 6 | (Switzerland) No. 51 Spirit Of Race | Ferrari 488 GTE | 6 | 4 | **4** | 4 | 1 | Ret | 70 |
| 7 | (France) No. 50 Larbre Compétition | Chevrolet Corvette C7.R | | 6 | | | | | 8 |
| Pos. | Team | Car | SIL (United Kingdom) | MNZ (Italy) | RBR (Austria) | LEC (France) | SPA (Belgium) | POR (Portugal) | Total |

Key
| Colour | Result |
|---|---|
| Gold | Race winner |
| Silver | 2nd place |
| Bronze | 3rd place |
| Green | Points finish |
| Blue | Non-points finish |
| Blue | Non-classified finish (NC) |
| Purple | Did not finish (Ret) |
| Black | Disqualified (DSQ) |
| Black | Excluded (EX) |
| White | Did not start (DNS) |
| White | Race cancelled (C) |
| White | Withdrew (WD) |
| Blank | Did not participate |

**Bold** – Pole
Italics – Fastest lap

== Drivers Championships ==
Points are awarded according to the following structure:

| Position | **1st** | **2nd** | **3rd** | **4th** | **5th** | **6th** | **7th** | **8th** | **9th** | **10th** | Other | **Pole** |
| Points | 25 | 18 | 15 | 12 | 10 | 8 | 6 | 4 | 2 | 1 | 0.5 | 1 |

=== LMP2 Drivers Championship ===
| Pos. | Driver | Team | SIL (United Kingdom) | MNZ (Italy) | RBR (Austria) | LEC (France) | SPA (Belgium) | POR (Portugal) | Points |
|---|---|---|---|---|---|---|---|---|---|
| 1 | (France) Léo Roussel | (Russia) G-Drive Racing | 2 | 1 | **2** | 2 | 2 | 4 | 110 |
| 1 | (Mexico) Memo Rojas | (Russia) G-Drive Racing | 2 | 1 | **2** | 2 | 2 | 4 | 110 |
| 2 | (Portugal) Filipe Albuquerque | (United States) United Autosports | 1 | 6 | 1 | 5 | 4 | 2 | 98 |
| 2 | (Switzerland) Hugo de Sadeleer | (United States) United Autosports | 1 | 6 | 1 | 5 | 4 | 2 | 98 |
| 2 | (United States) William Owen | (United States) United Autosports | 1 | 6 | 1 | 5 | 4 | 2 | 98 |
| 3 | (Australia) James Allen | (France) Graff | 4 | 8 | 4 | 6 | 1 | 1 | 86 |
| 3 | (United Kingdom) Richard Bradley | (France) Graff | 4 | 8 | 4 | 6 | 1 | 1 | 86 |
| 4 | (Japan) Ryō Hirakawa | (Russia) G-Drive Racing | 2 | 1 | | | 2 | 4 | 73 |
| 5 | (Colombia) Gustavo Yacamán | (France) Graff | | | 4 | 6 | 1 | 1 | 70 |
| 6 | (Russia) Egor Orudzhev | (Russia) SMP Racing | | | 6 | 1 | 3 | 3 | 63 |
| 6 | (Russia) Matevos Isaakyan | (Russia) SMP Racing | | | 6 | 1 | 3 | 3 | 63 |
| 7 | (France) Enzo Guibbert | (France) Graff | 7 | **4** | 3 | 3 | 6 | Ret | 57 |
| 7 | (France) Paul Petit | (France) Graff | 7 | **4** | 3 | 3 | 6 | Ret | 57 |
| 8 | (France) Eric Trouillet | (France) Graff | 7 | **4** | 3 | 3 | | | 49 |
| 9 | (Denmark) Anders Fjordbach | (Denmark) High Class Racing | 3 | 3 | 8 | 9 | 8 | 7 | 46 |
| 9 | (Denmark) Dennis Andersen | (Denmark) High Class Racing | 3 | 3 | 8 | 9 | 8 | 7 | 46 |
| 10 | (France) Fabien Barthez | (France) Panis Barthez Competition | 9 | 7 | 5 | 4 | 9 | **6** | 41 |
| 10 | (France) Timothé Buret | (France) Panis Barthez Competition | 9 | 7 | 5 | 4 | 9 | **6** | 41 |
| 11 | (United Kingdom) Ben Hanley | (United States) DragonSpeed | **10** | 2 | Ret | **7** | **5** | 9 | 40 |
| 11 | (Sweden) Henrik Hedman | (United States) DragonSpeed | **10** | 2 | Ret | **7** | **5** | 9 | 40 |
| 11 | (France) Nicolas Lapierre | (United States) DragonSpeed | **10** | 2 | Ret | **7** | **5** | 9 | 40 |
| 12 | (France) Nicolas Minassian | (Russia) G-Drive Racing | | | **2** | 2 | | | 37 |
| 13 | (France) Nathanaël Berthon | (France) Panis Barthez Competition | 9 | | 5 | 4 | 9 | **6** | 35 |
| 14 | (Italy) Andrea Belicchi | (Italy) Cetilar Villorba Corse | 6 | 5 | Ret | 10 | 7 | 5 | 35 |
| 14 | (Italy) Giorgio Sernagiotto | (Italy) Cetilar Villorba Corse | 6 | 5 | Ret | 10 | 7 | 5 | 35 |
| 14 | (Italy) Roberto Lacorte | (Italy) Cetilar Villorba Corse | 6 | 5 | Ret | 10 | 7 | 5 | 35 |
| 15 | (France) Franck Matelli | (France) Graff | 4 | 8 | | | | | 16 |
| 16 | (United Kingdom) Nigel Moore | (United Kingdom) Tockwith Motorsports | 5 | 11 | | | | | 12.5 |
| 16 | (United Kingdom) Phil Hanson | (United Kingdom) Tockwith Motorsports | 5 | 11 | 8 | | | | 12.5 |
| 17 | (Netherlands) Frits van Eerd | (Netherlands) Racing Team Nederland | 11 | 10 | 7 | 12 | 11 | 8 | 12.5 |
| 17 | (Netherlands) Jan Lammers | (Netherlands) Racing Team Nederland | 11 | 10 | 7 | 12 | 11 | 8 | 12.5 |
| 18 | (France) Patrice Lafargue | (France) IDEC Sport Racing | 8 | 9 | Ret | 11 | 10 | 10 | 8.5 |
| 18 | (France) Paul Lafargue Jr | (France) IDEC Sport Racing | 8 | 9 | Ret | 11 | 10 | 10 | 8.5 |
| 19 | (Switzerland) Jonathan Hirschi | (France) Graff | | | | | 6 | | 8 |
| 20 | (France) Andrea Pizzitola | (Portugal) Algarve Pro Racing | Ret | Ret | Ret | 8 | Ret | 11 | 4.5 |
| 20 | (United States) Matthew McMurry | (Portugal) Algarve Pro Racing | Ret | Ret | Ret | 8 | Ret | 11 | 4.5 |
| 21 | (France) David Zollinger | (France) IDEC Sport Racing | 8 | | | | | | 4 |
| 22 | (Italy) Andrea Roda | (Portugal) Algarve Pro Racing | Ret | Ret | Ret | 8 | Ret | | 4 |
| 23 | (France) Olivier Pla | (France) IDEC Sport Racing | | 9 | Ret | 11 | | | 2.5 |
| 24 | (France) Paul-Loup Chatin | (France) IDEC Sport Racing | | | | | 10 | 10 | 2 |
| 25 | (Mexico) Ricardo Sánchez | (France) Graff | | | | | | Ret | 0 |
| Pos. | Driver | Team | SIL (United Kingdom) | MNZ (Italy) | RBR (Austria) | LEC (France) | SPA (Belgium) | POR (Portugal) | Points |

Key
| Colour | Result |
|---|---|
| Gold | Race winner |
| Silver | 2nd place |
| Bronze | 3rd place |
| Green | Points finish |
| Blue | Non-points finish |
| Blue | Non-classified finish (NC) |
| Purple | Did not finish (Ret) |
| Black | Disqualified (DSQ) |
| Black | Excluded (EX) |
| White | Did not start (DNS) |
| White | Race cancelled (C) |
| White | Withdrew (WD) |
| Blank | Did not participate |

**Bold** – Pole
Italics – Fastest lap

=== LMP3 Drivers Championship ===
| Pos. | Driver | Team | SIL (United Kingdom) | MNZ (Italy) | RBR (Austria) | LEC (France) | SPA (Belgium) | POR (Portugal) | Points |
|---|---|---|---|---|---|---|---|---|---|
| 1 | (United States) John Falb | (United States) United Autosports | 1 | 9 | 2 | 1 | 3 | 2 | 103 |
| 1 | (United States) Sean Rayhall | (United States) United Autosports | 1 | 9 | 2 | 1 | 3 | 2 | 103 |
| 2 | (France) Alexandre Cougnaud | (France) M.Racing - YMR | 5 | 2 | 3 | 3 | 6 | 3 | 81 |
| 2 | (France) Antoine Jung | (France) M.Racing - YMR | 5 | 2 | 3 | 3 | 6 | 3 | 81 |
| 2 | (France) Romano Ricci | (France) M.Racing - YMR | 5 | 2 | 3 | 3 | 6 | 3 | 81 |
| 3 | (United Kingdom) Christian England | (United States) United Autosports | 3 | **4** | Ret | Ret | 5 | 1 | 63 |
| 3 | (United States) Mark Patterson | (United States) United Autosports | 3 | **4** | Ret | Ret | 5 | 1 | 63 |
| 3 | (United Kingdom) Wayne Boyd | (United States) United Autosports | 3 | **4** | Ret | Ret | 5 | 1 | 63 |
| 4 | (France) François Hériau | (France) Ultimate | 2 | 3 | 4 | 6 | 8 | 8 | 61 |
| 4 | (France) Jean-Baptiste Lahaye | (France) Ultimate | 2 | 3 | 4 | 6 | 8 | 8 | 61 |
| 4 | (France) Matthieu Lahaye | (France) Ultimate | 2 | 3 | 4 | 6 | 8 | 8 | 61 |
| 5 | (Poland) Jakub Śmiechowski | (Poland) Inter Europol Competition | 6 | 6 | 5 | 2 | 4 | Ret | 56 |
| 5 | (Germany) Martin Hippe | (Poland) Inter Europol Competition | 6 | 6 | 5 | 2 | 4 | Ret | 56 |
| 6 | (Belarus) Alexander Talkanitsa, Jr. | (Austria) AT Racing | **4** | Ret | 6 | Ret | **1** | **7** | 54 |
| 6 | (Belarus) Alexander Talkanitsa, Sr. | (Austria) AT Racing | **4** | Ret | 6 | Ret | **1** | **7** | 54 |
| 6 | (Denmark) Mikkel Jensen | (Austria) AT Racing | **4** | | 6 | Ret | **1** | **7** | 54 |
| 7 | (Italy) Giorgio Mondini | (United States) EuroInternational | Ret | 5 | 1 | 4 | Ret | 9 | 49 |
| 8 | (Switzerland) Antonin Borga | (France) Duqueine Engineering | 11 | 8 | **9** | Ret | 2 | 4 | 37.5 |
| 8 | (Switzerland) David Droux | (France) Duqueine Engineering | 11 | 8 | **9** | Ret | 2 | 4 | 37.5 |
| 8 | (France) Nicolas Schatz | (France) Duqueine Engineering | 11 | 8 | **9** | Ret | 2 | 4 | 37.5 |
| 9 | (Italy) Davide Uboldi | (United States) EuroInternational | Ret | 5 | 1 | | | | 35 |
| 10 | (Australia) Ricky Capo | (France) M.Racing - YMR (Rounds 1-2) (United States) EuroInternational (Rounds 3-6) | 10 | 1 | Ret | 8 | 11 | Ret | 30.5 |
| 11 | (United Kingdom) Anthony Wells | (United Kingdom) 360 Racing | 7 | 7 | Ret | **Ret** | 7 | 5 | 29 |
| 11 | (United Kingdom) Ross Kaiser | (United Kingdom) 360 Racing | 7 | 7 | Ret | **Ret** | 7 | 5 | 29 |
| 11 | (United Kingdom) Terrence Woodward | (United Kingdom) 360 Racing | 7 | 7 | Ret | **Ret** | 7 | 5 | 29 |
| 12 | (France) Erwin Creed | (France) M.Racing - YMR | 10 | 1 | Ret | Ret | | Ret | 26 |
| 13 | (United Kingdom) Alex Kapadia | (United Kingdom) RLR MSport | 8 | 10 | 8 | 7 | 9 | 6 | 25 |
| 13 | (Canada) John Farano | (United Kingdom) RLR MSport | 8 | 10 | 8 | 7 | 9 | 6 | 25 |
| 13 | (Denmark) Morten Dons | (United Kingdom) RLR MSport | 8 | 10 | 8 | 7 | 9 | 6 | 25 |
| 14 | (France) Eric Debard | (France) Panis Barthez Competition | 9 | 11 | Ret | 5 | Ret | Ret | 12.5 |
| 14 | (France) Simon Gachet | (France) Panis Barthez Competition | 9 | 11 | Ret | 5 | Ret | Ret | 12.5 |
| 14 | (United States) Theo Bean | (France) Panis Barthez Competition | 9 | 11 | Ret | 5 | Ret | Ret | 12.5 |
| 15 | (Italy) Marco Jacoboni | (United States) EuroInternational | | | | 4 | Ret | | 12 |
| 16 | (Colombia) Andrés Méndez | (Italy) Oregon Team | 13 | 32 | 7 | Ret | 10 | Ret | 8 |
| 16 | (Italy) Dario Capitanio | (Italy) Oregon Team | 13 | 32 | 7 | Ret | 10 | Ret | 8 |
| 16 | (Italy) Davide Roda | (Italy) Oregon Team | 13 | 32 | 7 | Ret | 10 | | 8 |
| 17 | (Italy) Andrea Dromedari | (United States) EuroInternational | 12 | 12 | Ret | 8 | 11 | 9 | 7.5 |
| 18 | (United States) Maxwell Hanratty | (United States) EuroInternational | 12 | 12 | | 8 | 11 | Ret | 5.5 |
| 19 | (Germany) Jürgen Krebs | (Spain) By Speed Factory | 15 | 15 | 10 | 9 | Ret | 12 | 4.5 |
| 20 | (Switzerland) Tim Müller | (Spain) By Speed Factory | 15 | 15 | 10 | 9 | Ret | | 4 |
| 21 | (Switzerland) Iradj Alexander | (France) Cool Racing by GPC | 14 | 14 | Ret | 10 | 12 | 11 | 3 |
| 22 | (Switzerland) Alexandre Coigny | (France) Cool Racing by GPC | | 14 | Ret | 10 | 12 | 11 | 2.5 |
| 23 | (Switzerland) Lucas Légeret | (France) Duqueine Engineering | | 13 | 11 | Ret | 13 | 10 | 2.5 |
| 23 | (France) Vincent Beltoise | (France) Duqueine Engineering | Ret | 13 | 11 | Ret | 13 | 10 | 2.5 |
| 24 | (France) Nicolas Melin | (France) Duqueine Engineering | | | | Ret | 13 | 10 | 1.5 |
| 25 | (France) Yann Ehrlacher | (France) M.Racing - YMR | 10 | | Ret | Ret | Ret | Ret | 1 |
| 26 | (Switzerland) Gino Forgione | (France) Cool Racing by GPC | 14 | 14 | | | | | 1 |
| 26 | (France) Maxime Pialat | (United States) EuroInternational | 12 | 12 | | | | | 1 |
| 26 | (Estonia) Tristan Viidas | (Spain) By Speed Factory | 15 | 15 | | | | | 1 |
| 27 | (France) Henry Hassid | (France) Duqueine Engineering | Ret | 13 | | | | | 0.5 |
| 28 | (Sweden) Douglas Lundberg | (France) Duqueine Engineering | | | 11 | | | | 0.5 |
| 29 | (Switzerland) Giorgio Maggi | (Spain) By Speed Factory | | | | | | 12 | 0.5 |
| 29 | (Russia) Timur Boguslavskiy | (Spain) By Speed Factory | | | | | | 12 | 0.5 |
| 30 | (Spain) Antonio Forne | (Italy) Oregon Team | | | | | | Ret | 0 |
| 30 | (Canada) James Dayson | (United States) EuroInternational | | | Ret | | | Ret | 0 |
| 30 | (Italy) Maurizio Mediani | (Austria) AT Racing | | Ret | | | | | 0 |
| 30 | (Australia) Neale Muston | (France) M.Racing - YMR | | | | | Ret | | 0 |
| Pos. | Driver | Team | SIL (United Kingdom) | MNZ (Italy) | RBR (Austria) | LEC (France) | SPA (Belgium) | POR (Portugal) | Points |

Key
| Colour | Result |
|---|---|
| Gold | Race winner |
| Silver | 2nd place |
| Bronze | 3rd place |
| Green | Points finish |
| Blue | Non-points finish |
| Blue | Non-classified finish (NC) |
| Purple | Did not finish (Ret) |
| Black | Disqualified (DSQ) |
| Black | Excluded (EX) |
| White | Did not start (DNS) |
| White | Race cancelled (C) |
| White | Withdrew (WD) |
| Blank | Did not participate |

**Bold** – Pole
Italics – Fastest lap

=== LMGTE Drivers Championship ===
| Pos. | Driver | Team | SIL (United Kingdom) | MNZ (Italy) | RBR (Austria) | LEC (France) | SPA (Belgium) | POR (Portugal) | Points |
|---|---|---|---|---|---|---|---|---|---|
| 1 | (United Kingdom) Jody Fannin | (United Kingdom) JMW Motorsport | 5 | 1 | 2 | 3 | 2 | 2 | 104 |
| 1 | (United Kingdom) Robert Smith | (United Kingdom) JMW Motorsport | 5 | 1 | 2 | 3 | 2 | 2 | 104 |
| 2 | (United Kingdom) Euan Hankey | (United Kingdom) TF Sport | **1** | 2 | 3 | 2 | 5 | 3 | 102 |
| 2 | (Denmark) Nicki Thiim | (United Kingdom) TF Sport | **1** | 2 | 3 | 2 | 5 | 3 | 102 |
| 2 | (Turkey) Salih Yoluç | (United Kingdom) TF Sport | **1** | 2 | 3 | 2 | 5 | 3 | 102 |
| 3 | (Germany) Christian Ried | (Germany) Proton Competition | 2 | 5 | 5 | 6 | **6** | 1 | 80 |
| 3 | (Switzerland) Joel Camathias | (Germany) Proton Competition | 2 | 5 | 5 | 6 | **6** | 1 | 80 |
| 3 | (Italy) Matteo Cairoli | (Germany) Proton Competition | 2 | 5 | 5 | 6 | **6** | 1 | 80 |
| 4 | (United Kingdom) Aaron Scott | (Switzerland) Spirit of Race | 4 | **Ret** | 1 | **1** | 4 | **Ret** | 77 |
| 4 | (United Kingdom) Duncan Cameron | (Switzerland) Spirit of Race | 4 | **Ret** | 1 | **1** | 4 | **Ret** | 77 |
| 4 | (Republic of Ireland) Matt Griffin | (Switzerland) Spirit of Race | 4 | **Ret** | 1 | **1** | 4 | **Ret** | 77 |
| 5 | (United Kingdom) Andrew Howard | (United Kingdom) Beechdean AMR | 3 | 3 | 6 | 5 | 3 | 4 | 75 |
| 5 | (United Kingdom) Darren Turner | (United Kingdom) Beechdean AMR | 3 | 3 | 6 | 5 | 3 | 4 | 75 |
| 6 | (Italy) Andrea Bertolini | (Switzerland) Spirit of Race | 6 | 4 | **4** | 4 | 1 | Ret | 70 |
| 6 | (Italy) Giorgio Roda | (Switzerland) Spirit of Race | 6 | 4 | **4** | 4 | 1 | Ret | 70 |
| 7 | (United Kingdom) Ross Gunn | (United Kingdom) Beechdean AMR | 3 | 3 | 6 | 5 | 3 | | 63 |
| 8 | (United Kingdom) Jonathan Cocker | (United Kingdom) JMW Motorsport | | 1 | 2 | 3 | | | 58 |
| 9 | (Italy) Gianluca Roda | (Switzerland) Spirit of Race | 6 | 4 | **4** | 4 | | Ret | 45 |
| 10 | (United Kingdom) William Stevens | (United Kingdom) JMW Motorsport | | | | | 2 | 2 | 36 |
| 11 | (Italy) Rino Mastronardi | (Switzerland) Spirit of Race | | | | | 1 | | 25 |
| 12 | (Germany) Immanuel Vinke | (United Kingdom) Beechdean AMR | | | | | | 4 | 12 |
| 13 | (United Kingdom) Rory Butcher | (United Kingdom) JMW Motorsport | 5 | | | | | | 10 |
| 14 | (France) Christian Philippon | (France) Larbre Compétition | | 6 | | | | | 8 |
| 14 | (Brazil) Fernando Rees | (France) Larbre Compétition | | 6 | | | | | 8 |
| 14 | (France) Romain Brandela | (France) Larbre Compétition | | 6 | | | | | 8 |
| Pos. | Driver | Team | SIL (United Kingdom) | MNZ (Italy) | RBR (Austria) | LEC (France) | SPA (Belgium) | POR (Portugal) | Points |

Key
| Colour | Result |
|---|---|
| Gold | Race winner |
| Silver | 2nd place |
| Bronze | 3rd place |
| Green | Points finish |
| Blue | Non-points finish |
| Blue | Non-classified finish (NC) |
| Purple | Did not finish (Ret) |
| Black | Disqualified (DSQ) |
| Black | Excluded (EX) |
| White | Did not start (DNS) |
| White | Race cancelled (C) |
| White | Withdrew (WD) |
| Blank | Did not participate |

**Bold** – Pole
Italics – Fastest lap
