= 4 Hours of Monza =

Former sports car race held in Italy

European Le Mans Series
- Venue: Monza Circuit
- Location: Monza, Italy
- First race: 2017
- Last race: 2022
- Duration: 4 hours
- Most wins (driver): (Russia) Roman Rusinov (2)
- Most wins (team): (Russia) G-Drive Racing (3)
- Most wins (manufacturer): (France) Oreca (5)

Circuit information
- Length: 5.793 km (3.600 mi)
- Turns: 11

The 4 Hours of Monza was an endurance race for sports cars held at Monza Circuit in Monza, Italy.

== History ==
The 4 Hours of Monza was added to the European Le Mans Series (ELMS) calendar for the first time in 2017, replacing the previous Italian race at Imola Circuit. The last time the ELMS ran at Monza was in 2008, as part of the Le Mans Series as the 1000 km of Monza.

The inaugural event was won by Memo Rojas, Léo Roussel and Ryo Hirakawa driving for G-Drive Racing. G-Drive claimed top honors the following two years with five different drivers, only Roman Rusinov repeating as winner in both races. The 2019 edition was the first victory for the rebranded Oreca 07, Aurus 01.

The 2020 race was dominated by United Autosports drivers Filipe Albuquerque and Phil Hanson, who also claimed the ELMS title at this round. Panis Racing took its first victory in the ELMS at the 2021 edition with James Allen, Julien Canal and Will Stevens. The most recent edition in 2022 saw IDEC Sport take top spoils for the first time in three years with Paul-Loup Chatin, Paul Lafargue and Patrick Pilet, overcoming a 20 second penalty.

== Results ==
Year	Overall winner(s)	Entrant	Car	Duration	Race title	Championship	Report	Ref
2017	(Mexico) Memo Rojas (France) Léo Roussel (Japan) Ryo Hirakawa	(Russia) G-Drive Racing	Oreca 07	4:01:43.628	4 Hours of Monza	European Le Mans Series	report	
2018	(France) Andrea Pizzitola (Russia) Roman Rusinov (France) Jean-Éric Vergne	(Russia) G-Drive Racing	Oreca 07	4:01:02.607	4 Hours of Monza	European Le Mans Series	report	
2019	(France) Norman Nato (Russia) Roman Rusinov (Netherlands) Job van Uitert	(Russia) G-Drive Racing	Aurus 01	4:01:40.662	4 Hours of Monza	European Le Mans Series	report	
2020	(Portugal) Filipe Albuquerque (United Kingdom) Phil Hanson	(United Kingdom) United Autosports	Oreca 07	4:00:07.963	4 Hours of Monza	European Le Mans Series	report	
2021	(Australia) James Allen (France) Julien Canal (United Kingdom) Will Stevens	(France) Panis Racing	Oreca 07	4:00:56.924	4 Hours of Monza	European Le Mans Series	report	
2022	(France) Paul-Loup Chatin (France) Paul Lafargue (France) Patrick Pilet	(France) IDEC Sport	Oreca 07	4:00:54.476	4 Hours of Monza	European Le Mans Series	report	

=== Records ===
==== Wins by constructor ====
Rank	Constructor	Wins	Years
1	(France) Oreca	5	2017–2018, 2020–2022
2	(Russia) Aurus	1	2019

==== Wins by engine manufacturer ====
Rank	Constructor	Wins	Years
1	(United Kingdom) Gibson	6	2027–2022

==== Drivers with multiple wins ====
Rank	Driver	Wins	Years
1	(Russia) Roman Rusinov	2	2018–2019
