= 2017 4 Hours of Silverstone =

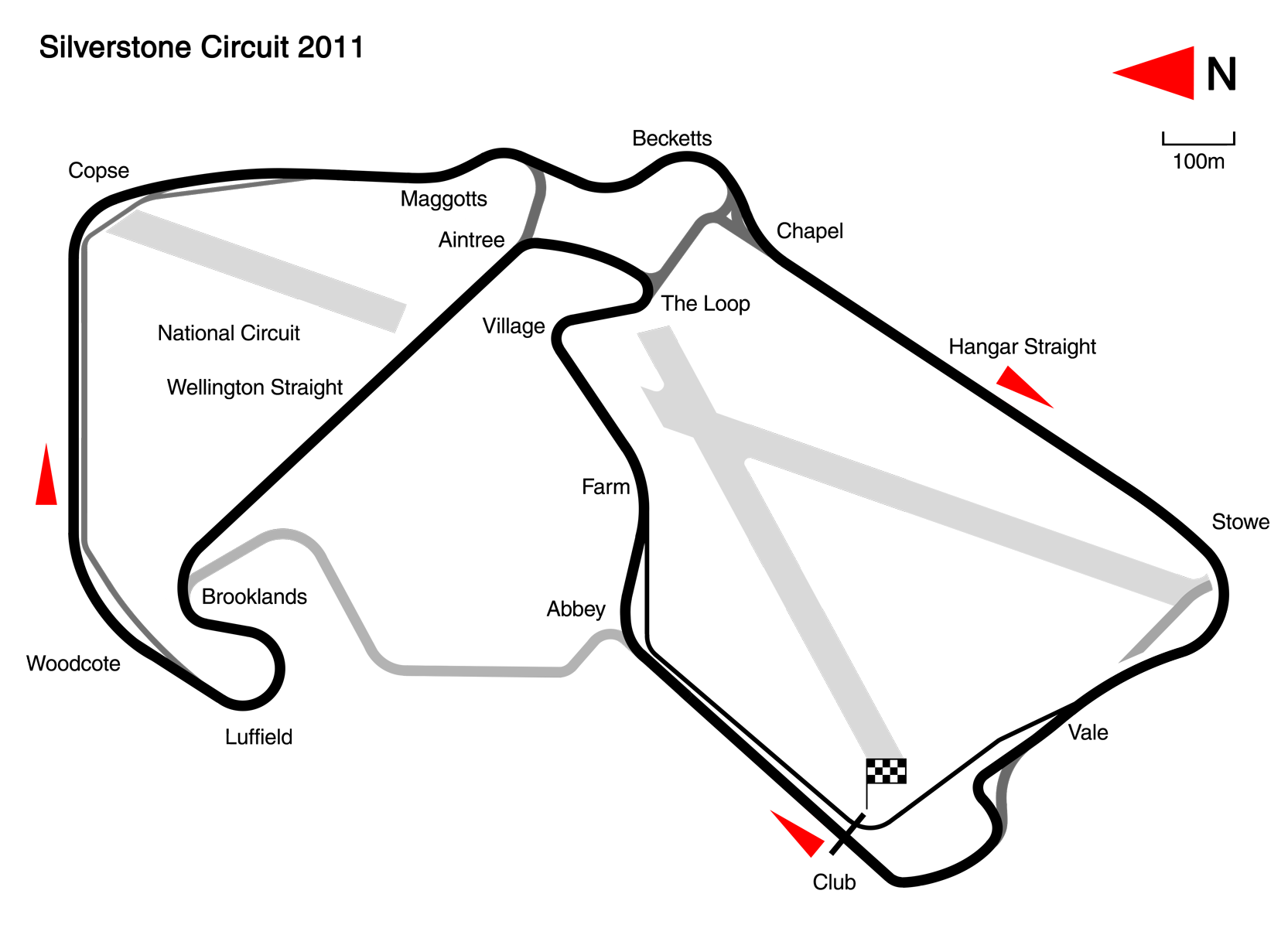
Layout of Silverstone Circuit

The 2017 4 Hours of Silverstone was an endurance motor race held at Silvertone Circuit in Silverstone, United Kingdom on 14–15 April 2017. It was the first round of the 2017 European Le Mans Series.

== Race ==
=== Race result ===
Class winners in bold.

Pos	Class	No.	Team	Drivers	Chassis	Tyre	Laps
Pos	Class	No.	Team	Drivers	Engine	Tyre	Laps
1	**LMP2**	**32**	**(United States) United Autosports**	**(Portugal) Filipe Albuquerque** **(United States) William Owen** **(Switzerland) Hugo de Sadeleer**	**Ligier JS P217**	D	**126**
1	**LMP2**	**32**	**(United States) United Autosports**	**(Portugal) Filipe Albuquerque** **(United States) William Owen** **(Switzerland) Hugo de Sadeleer**	**Gibson GK428 4.2 L V8**	D	**126**
2	LMP2	22	(Russia) G-Drive Racing	(Mexico) Memo Rojas (France) Léo Roussel (Japan) Ryō Hirakawa	Oreca 07	D	126
2	LMP2	22	(Russia) G-Drive Racing	(Mexico) Memo Rojas (France) Léo Roussel (Japan) Ryō Hirakawa	Gibson GK428 4.2 L V8	D	126
3	LMP2	49	(Denmark) High Class Racing	(Denmark) Dennis Andersen (Denmark) Anders Fjordbach	Dallara P217	D	126
3	LMP2	49	(Denmark) High Class Racing	(Denmark) Dennis Andersen (Denmark) Anders Fjordbach	Gibson GK428 4.2 L V8	D	126
4	LMP2	40	(France) Graff	(Australia) James Allen (United Kingdom) Richard Bradley (France) Franck Matelli	Oreca 07	D	126
4	LMP2	40	(France) Graff	(Australia) James Allen (United Kingdom) Richard Bradley (France) Franck Matelli	Gibson GK428 4.2 L V8	D	126
5	LMP2	34	(United Kingdom) Tockwith Motorsports	(United Kingdom) Phil Hanson (United Kingdom) Nigel Moore	Ligier JS P217	D	126
5	LMP2	34	(United Kingdom) Tockwith Motorsports	(United Kingdom) Phil Hanson (United Kingdom) Nigel Moore	Gibson GK428 4.2 L V8	D	126
6	LMP2	47	(Italy) Cetilar Villorba Corse	(Italy) Andrea Belicchi (Italy) Roberto Lacorte (Italy) Giorgio Sernagiotto	Dallara P217	D	126
6	LMP2	47	(Italy) Cetilar Villorba Corse	(Italy) Andrea Belicchi (Italy) Roberto Lacorte (Italy) Giorgio Sernagiotto	Gibson GK428 4.2 L V8	D	126
7	LMP2	39	(France) Graff	(France) Enzo Guibbert (France) Paul Petit (France) Eric Trouillet	Oreca 07	D	125
7	LMP2	39	(France) Graff	(France) Enzo Guibbert (France) Paul Petit (France) Eric Trouillet	Gibson GK428 4.2 L V8	D	125
8	LMP2	28	(France) IDEC Sport Racing	(France) Patrice Lafargue (France) Paul Lafargue (France) David Zollinger	Ligier JS P217	M	123
8	LMP2	28	(France) IDEC Sport Racing	(France) Patrice Lafargue (France) Paul Lafargue (France) David Zollinger	Gibson GK428 4.2 L V8	M	123
9	LMP2	23	(France) Panis Barthez Competition	(France) Fabien Barthez (France) Timothé Buret (France) Nathanaël Berthon	Ligier JS P217	M	123
9	LMP2	23	(France) Panis Barthez Competition	(France) Fabien Barthez (France) Timothé Buret (France) Nathanaël Berthon	Gibson GK428 4.2 L V8	M	123
10	LMP2	21	(United States) DragonSpeed	(United Kingdom) Ben Hanley (Sweden) Henrik Hedman (France) Nicolas Lapierre	Oreca 07	D	120
10	LMP2	21	(United States) DragonSpeed	(United Kingdom) Ben Hanley (Sweden) Henrik Hedman (France) Nicolas Lapierre	Gibson GK428 4.2 L V8	D	120
11	**LMP3**	**2**	**(United States) United Autosports**	**(United States) John Falb** **(United States) Sean Rayhall**	**Ligier JS P3**	M	**119**
11	**LMP3**	**2**	**(United States) United Autosports**	**(United States) John Falb** **(United States) Sean Rayhall**	**Nissan VK50 5.0 L V8**	M	**119**
12	LMP3	17	(France) Ultimate	(France) François Hériau (France) Jean-Baptiste Lahaye (France) Matthieu Lahaye	Ligier JS P3	M	118
12	LMP3	17	(France) Ultimate	(France) François Hériau (France) Jean-Baptiste Lahaye (France) Matthieu Lahaye	Nissan VK50 5.0 L V8	M	118
13	LMP3	3	(United States) United Autosports	(United Kingdom) Christian England (United Kingdom) Wayne Boyd (United States) Mark Patterson	Ligier JS P3	M	118
13	LMP3	3	(United States) United Autosports	(United Kingdom) Christian England (United Kingdom) Wayne Boyd (United States) Mark Patterson	Nissan VK50 5.0 L V8	M	118
14	LMP3	9	(Austria) AT Racing	(Belarus) Alexander Talkanitsa, Jr. (Belarus) Alexander Talkanitsa, Sr. (Denmark) Mikkel Jensen	Ligier JS P3	M	118
14	LMP3	9	(Austria) AT Racing	(Belarus) Alexander Talkanitsa, Jr. (Belarus) Alexander Talkanitsa, Sr. (Denmark) Mikkel Jensen	Nissan VK50 5.0 L V8	M	118
15	LMP3	18	(France) M.Racing - YMR	(France) Alexandre Cougnaud (France) Antoine Jung (France) Romano Ricci	Ligier JS P3	M	118
15	LMP3	18	(France) M.Racing - YMR	(France) Alexandre Cougnaud (France) Antoine Jung (France) Romano Ricci	Nissan VK50 5.0 L V8	M	118
16	LMP3	13	(Poland) Inter Europol Competition	(Germany) Martin Hippe (Poland) Jakub Śmiechowski	Ligier JS P3	M	118
16	LMP3	13	(Poland) Inter Europol Competition	(Germany) Martin Hippe (Poland) Jakub Śmiechowski	Nissan VK50 5.0 L V8	M	118
17	LMP3	6	(United Kingdom) 360 Racing	(United Kingdom) Ross Kaiser (United Kingdom) Anthony Wells (United Kingdom) Terrence Woodward	Ligier JS P3	M	118
17	LMP3	6	(United Kingdom) 360 Racing	(United Kingdom) Ross Kaiser (United Kingdom) Anthony Wells (United Kingdom) Terrence Woodward	Nissan VK50 5.0 L V8	M	118
18	LMP2	29	(Netherlands) Racing Team Nederland	(Netherlands) Frits van Eerd (Netherlands) Jan Lammers	Dallara P217	D	117
18	LMP2	29	(Netherlands) Racing Team Nederland	(Netherlands) Frits van Eerd (Netherlands) Jan Lammers	Gibson GK428 4.2 L V8	D	117
19	LMP3	15	(United Kingdom) RLR MSport	(Denmark) Morten Dons (Canada) John Farano (United Kingdom) Alex Kapadia	Ligier JS P3	M	117
19	LMP3	15	(United Kingdom) RLR MSport	(Denmark) Morten Dons (Canada) John Farano (United Kingdom) Alex Kapadia	Nissan VK50 5.0 L V8	M	117
20	LMP3	16	(France) Panis Barthez Competition	(France) Eric Debard (France) Simon Gachet (United States) Theo Bean	Ligier JS P3	M	117
20	LMP3	16	(France) Panis Barthez Competition	(France) Eric Debard (France) Simon Gachet (United States) Theo Bean	Nissan VK50 5.0 L V8	M	117
21	LMP3	19	(France) M.Racing - YMR	(France) Erwin Creed (France) Yann Ehrlacher (Australia) Ricky Capo	Ligier JS P3	M	116
21	LMP3	19	(France) M.Racing - YMR	(France) Erwin Creed (France) Yann Ehrlacher (Australia) Ricky Capo	Nissan VK50 5.0 L V8	M	116
22	LMP3	7	(France) Duqueine Engineering	(Switzerland) Antonin Borga (Switzerland) David Droux (France) Nicolas Schatz	Ligier JS P3	M	116
22	LMP3	7	(France) Duqueine Engineering	(Switzerland) Antonin Borga (Switzerland) David Droux (France) Nicolas Schatz	Nissan VK50 5.0 L V8	M	116
23	LMP3	12	(United States) Eurointernational	(Italy) Andrea Dromedari (United States) Max Hanratty (France) Maxime Pialat	Ligier JS P3	M	116
23	LMP3	12	(United States) Eurointernational	(Italy) Andrea Dromedari (United States) Max Hanratty (France) Maxime Pialat	Nissan VK50 5.0 L V8	M	116
24	**GTE**	**90**	**(United Kingdom) TF Sport**	**(United Kingdom) Euan Hankey** **(Denmark) Nicki Thiim** **(Turkey) Salih Yoluc**	**Aston Martin Vantage GTE**	D	**116**
24	**GTE**	**90**	**(United Kingdom) TF Sport**	**(United Kingdom) Euan Hankey** **(Denmark) Nicki Thiim** **(Turkey) Salih Yoluc**	**Aston Martin 4.5 L V8**	D	**116**
25	GTE	77	(Germany) Proton Competition	(Italy) Matteo Cairoli (Switzerland) Joël Camathias (Germany) Christian Ried	Porsche 911 RSR	D	115
25	GTE	77	(Germany) Proton Competition	(Italy) Matteo Cairoli (Switzerland) Joël Camathias (Germany) Christian Ried	Porsche 4.0 L Flat-6	D	115
26	GTE	99	(United Kingdom) Beechdean AMR	(United Kingdom) Andrew Howard (United Kingdom) Ross Gunn (United Kingdom) Darren Turner	Aston Martin Vantage GTE	D	115
26	GTE	99	(United Kingdom) Beechdean AMR	(United Kingdom) Andrew Howard (United Kingdom) Ross Gunn (United Kingdom) Darren Turner	Aston Martin 4.5 L V8	D	115
27	GTE	55	(Switzerland) Spirit of Race	(United Kingdom) Duncan Cameron (Republic of Ireland) Matt Griffin (United Kingdom) Aaron Scott	Ferrari 488 GTE	D	115
27	GTE	55	(Switzerland) Spirit of Race	(United Kingdom) Duncan Cameron (Republic of Ireland) Matt Griffin (United Kingdom) Aaron Scott	Ferrari F154CB 3.9 L Turbo V8	D	115
28	GTE	66	(United Kingdom) JMW Motorsport	(United Kingdom) Jody Fannin (United Kingdom) Robert Smith (United Kingdom) Rory Butcher	Ferrari 458 Italia GT2	D	114
28	GTE	66	(United Kingdom) JMW Motorsport	(United Kingdom) Jody Fannin (United Kingdom) Robert Smith (United Kingdom) Rory Butcher	Ferrari 4.5 L V8	D	114
29	GTE	51	(Switzerland) Spirit of Race	(Italy) Andrea Bertolini (Italy) Gianluca Roda (Italy) Giorgio Roda	Ferrari 488 GTE	D	113
29	GTE	51	(Switzerland) Spirit of Race	(Italy) Andrea Bertolini (Italy) Gianluca Roda (Italy) Giorgio Roda	Ferrari F154CB 3.9 L Turbo V8	D	113
30	LMP3	10	(Italy) Oregon Team	(Italy) Dario Capitanio (Colombia) Andrés Méndez (Italy) Davide Roda	Norma M30	M	113
30	LMP3	10	(Italy) Oregon Team	(Italy) Dario Capitanio (Colombia) Andrés Méndez (Italy) Davide Roda	Nissan VK50 5.0 L V8	M	113
31	LMP3	4	(France) Cool Racing by GPC	(Switzerland) Iradj Alexander (Switzerland) Gino Forgione	Ligier JS P3	M	112
31	LMP3	4	(France) Cool Racing by GPC	(Switzerland) Iradj Alexander (Switzerland) Gino Forgione	Nissan VK50 5.0 L V8	M	112
32	LMP3	5	(Spain) By Speed Factory	(Germany) Jürgen Krebs (Switzerland) Tim Müller (Estonia) Tristan Viidas	Ligier JS P3	M	104
32	LMP3	5	(Spain) By Speed Factory	(Germany) Jürgen Krebs (Switzerland) Tim Müller (Estonia) Tristan Viidas	Nissan VK50 5.0 L V8	M	104
DNF	LMP2	25	(Portugal) Algarve Pro Racing	(France) Julien Canal (Mexico) Memo Rojas (France) Nathanaël Berthon	Ligier JS P217	D	70
DNF	LMP2	25	(Portugal) Algarve Pro Racing	(France) Julien Canal (Mexico) Memo Rojas (France) Nathanaël Berthon	Gibson GK428 4.2 L V8	D	70
DNF	LMP3	8	(France) Duqueine Engineering	(France) Vincent Beltoise (France) Henry Hassid	Ligier JS P3	M	41
DNF	LMP3	8	(France) Duqueine Engineering	(France) Vincent Beltoise (France) Henry Hassid	Nissan VK50 5.0 L V8	M	41
DNF	LMP3	11	(United States) Eurointernational	(Italy) Giorgio Mondini (Italy) Davide Uboldi	Ligier JS P3	M	17
DNF	LMP3	11	(United States) Eurointernational	(Italy) Giorgio Mondini (Italy) Davide Uboldi	Nissan VK50 5.0 L V8	M	17

European Le Mans Series
Previous race: none	2017 season	Next race: Monza
