= 2017 4 Hours of Portimão =

Layout of Algarve International Circuit

The 2017 4 Hours of Portimão was an endurance motor race held at Algarve International Circuit in Portimão, Portugal on 21–22 October 2017. It was the sixth and final round of the 2017 European Le Mans Series.

== Race ==
=== Race result ===
Class winners in bold.

Pos	Class	No.	Team	Drivers	Chassis	Tyre	Laps
Pos	Class	No.	Team	Drivers	Engine	Tyre	Laps
1	**LMP2**	**40**	**(France) Graff**	**(Australia) James Allen** **(United Kingdom) Richard Bradley** **(Colombia) Gustavo Yacamán**	**Oreca 07**	D	**139**
1	**LMP2**	**40**	**(France) Graff**	**(Australia) James Allen** **(United Kingdom) Richard Bradley** **(Colombia) Gustavo Yacamán**	**Gibson GK428 4.2 L V8**	D	**139**
2	LMP2	32	(United States) United Autosports	(Portugal) Filipe Albuquerque (United States) William Owen (Switzerland) Hugo de Sadeleer	Ligier JS P217	D	139
2	LMP2	32	(United States) United Autosports	(Portugal) Filipe Albuquerque (United States) William Owen (Switzerland) Hugo de Sadeleer	Gibson GK428 4.2 L V8	D	139
3	LMP2	27	(Russia) SMP Racing	(Russia) Matevos Isaakyan (Russia) Matevos Isaakyan	Dallara P217	D	139
3	LMP2	27	(Russia) SMP Racing	(Russia) Matevos Isaakyan (Russia) Matevos Isaakyan	Gibson GK428 4.2 L V8	D	139
4	LMP2	22	(Russia) G-Drive Racing	(Mexico) Memo Rojas (France) Léo Roussel (Japan) Ryō Hirakawa	Oreca 07	D	139
4	LMP2	22	(Russia) G-Drive Racing	(Mexico) Memo Rojas (France) Léo Roussel (Japan) Ryō Hirakawa	Gibson GK428 4.2 L V8	D	139
5	LMP2	47	(Italy) Cetilar Villorba Corse	(Italy) Andrea Belicchi (Italy) Roberto Lacorte (Italy) Giorgio Sernagiotto	Dallara P217	D	138
5	LMP2	47	(Italy) Cetilar Villorba Corse	(Italy) Andrea Belicchi (Italy) Roberto Lacorte (Italy) Giorgio Sernagiotto	Gibson GK428 4.2 L V8	D	138
6	LMP2	23	(France) Panis Barthez Competition	(France) Fabien Barthez (France) Timothé Buret (France) Nathanaël Berthon	Ligier JS P217	MI	138
6	LMP2	23	(France) Panis Barthez Competition	(France) Fabien Barthez (France) Timothé Buret (France) Nathanaël Berthon	Gibson GK428 4.2 L V8	MI	138
7	LMP2	49	(Denmark) High Class Racing	(Denmark) Dennis Andersen (Denmark) Anders Fjordbach	Dallara P217	D	137
7	LMP2	49	(Denmark) High Class Racing	(Denmark) Dennis Andersen (Denmark) Anders Fjordbach	Gibson GK428 4.2 L V8	D	137
8	LMP2	29	(Netherlands) Racing Team Nederland	(Netherlands) Frits van Eerd (Netherlands) Jan Lammers	Dallara P217	D	137
8	LMP2	29	(Netherlands) Racing Team Nederland	(Netherlands) Frits van Eerd (Netherlands) Jan Lammers	Gibson GK428 4.2 L V8	D	137
9	LMP2	21	(United States) DragonSpeed	(United Kingdom) Ben Hanley (Sweden) Henrik Hedman (France) Nicolas Lapierre	Oreca 07	D	137
9	LMP2	21	(United States) DragonSpeed	(United Kingdom) Ben Hanley (Sweden) Henrik Hedman (France) Nicolas Lapierre	Gibson GK428 4.2 L V8	D	137
10	LMP2	28	(France) IDEC Sport Racing	(France) Patrice Lafargue (France) Paul Lafargue (France) Paul-Loup Chatin	Ligier JS P217	MI	137
10	LMP2	28	(France) IDEC Sport Racing	(France) Patrice Lafargue (France) Paul Lafargue (France) Paul-Loup Chatin	Gibson GK428 4.2 L V8	MI	137
11	**LMP3**	**3**	**(United States) United Autosports**	**(United Kingdom) Christian England** **(United Kingdom) Wayne Boyd** **(United States) Mark Patterson**	**Ligier JS P3**	MI	**132**
11	**LMP3**	**3**	**(United States) United Autosports**	**(United Kingdom) Christian England** **(United Kingdom) Wayne Boyd** **(United States) Mark Patterson**	**Nissan VK50 5.0 L V8**	MI	**132**
12	LMP3	2	(United States) United Autosports	(United States) John Falb (United States) Sean Rayhall	Ligier JS P3	MI	132
12	LMP3	2	(United States) United Autosports	(United States) John Falb (United States) Sean Rayhall	Nissan VK50 5.0 L V8	MI	132
13	LMP3	18	(France) M.Racing - YMR	(France) Alexandre Cougnaud (France) Antoine Jung (France) Romano Ricci	Ligier JS P3	MI	131
13	LMP3	18	(France) M.Racing - YMR	(France) Alexandre Cougnaud (France) Antoine Jung (France) Romano Ricci	Nissan VK50 5.0 L V8	MI	131
14	LMP3	7	(France) Duqueine Engineering	(Switzerland) Antonin Borga (Switzerland) David Droux (France) Nicolas Schatz	Norma M30	MI	131
14	LMP3	7	(France) Duqueine Engineering	(Switzerland) Antonin Borga (Switzerland) David Droux (France) Nicolas Schatz	Nissan VK50 5.0 L V8	MI	131
15	LMP3	6	(United Kingdom) 360 Racing	(United Kingdom) Ross Kaiser (United Kingdom) Anthony Wells (United Kingdom) Terrence Woodward	Ligier JS P3	MI	131
15	LMP3	6	(United Kingdom) 360 Racing	(United Kingdom) Ross Kaiser (United Kingdom) Anthony Wells (United Kingdom) Terrence Woodward	Nissan VK50 5.0 L V8	MI	131
16	LMP3	15	(United Kingdom) RLR MSport	(Denmark) Morten Dons (Canada) John Farano (United Kingdom) Alex Kapadia	Ligier JS P3	MI	130
16	LMP3	15	(United Kingdom) RLR MSport	(Denmark) Morten Dons (Canada) John Farano (United Kingdom) Alex Kapadia	Nissan VK50 5.0 L V8	MI	130
17	LMP3	9	(Austria) AT Racing	(Belarus) Alexander Talkanitsa Jr. (Belarus) Alexander Talkanitsa Sr. (Denmark) Mikkel Jensen	Ligier JS P3	MI	130
17	LMP3	9	(Austria) AT Racing	(Belarus) Alexander Talkanitsa Jr. (Belarus) Alexander Talkanitsa Sr. (Denmark) Mikkel Jensen	Nissan VK50 5.0 L V8	MI	130
18	LMP3	17	(France) Ultimate	(France) François Hériau (France) Jean-Baptiste Lahaye (France) Matthieu Lahaye	Ligier JS P3	MI	130
18	LMP3	17	(France) Ultimate	(France) François Hériau (France) Jean-Baptiste Lahaye (France) Matthieu Lahaye	Nissan VK50 5.0 L V8	MI	130
19	LMP3	11	(United States) Eurointernational	(Italy) Giorgio Mondini (Italy) Andrea Dromedari	Ligier JS P3	MI	129
19	LMP3	11	(United States) Eurointernational	(Italy) Giorgio Mondini (Italy) Andrea Dromedari	Nissan VK50 5.0 L V8	MI	129
20	**GTE**	**77**	**(Germany) Proton Competition**	**(Italy) Matteo Cairoli** **(Switzerland) Joël Camathias** **(Germany) Christian Ried**	**Porsche 911 RSR**	D	**129**
20	**GTE**	**77**	**(Germany) Proton Competition**	**(Italy) Matteo Cairoli** **(Switzerland) Joël Camathias** **(Germany) Christian Ried**	**Porsche 4.0 L Flat-6**	D	**129**
21	GTE	66	(United Kingdom) JMW Motorsport	(United Kingdom) Jody Fannin (United Kingdom) Robert Smith (United Kingdom) Will Stevens	Ferrari 458 Italia GT2	D	129
21	GTE	66	(United Kingdom) JMW Motorsport	(United Kingdom) Jody Fannin (United Kingdom) Robert Smith (United Kingdom) Will Stevens	Ferrari 4.5 L V8	D	129
22	LMP3	8	(France) Duqueine Engineering	(France) Vincent Beltoise (France) Nicolas Melin (Switzerland) Lucas Légeret	Norma M30	MI	129
22	LMP3	8	(France) Duqueine Engineering	(France) Vincent Beltoise (France) Nicolas Melin (Switzerland) Lucas Légeret	Nissan VK50 5.0 L V8	MI	129
23	GTE	90	(United Kingdom) TF Sport	(United Kingdom) Euan Hankey (Denmark) Nicki Thiim (Turkey) Salih Yoluc	Aston Martin Vantage GTE	D	128
23	GTE	90	(United Kingdom) TF Sport	(United Kingdom) Euan Hankey (Denmark) Nicki Thiim (Turkey) Salih Yoluc	Aston Martin 4.5 L V8	D	128
24	LMP3	4	(France) Cool Racing by GPC	(Switzerland) Iradj Alexander (Switzerland) Alexandre Coigny	Ligier JS P3	MI	127
24	LMP3	4	(France) Cool Racing by GPC	(Switzerland) Iradj Alexander (Switzerland) Alexandre Coigny	Nissan VK50 5.0 L V8	MI	127
25	GTE	99	(United Kingdom) Beechdean AMR	(United Kingdom) Andrew Howard (Germany) Immanuel Vinke (United Kingdom) Darren Turner	Aston Martin Vantage GTE	D	126
25	GTE	99	(United Kingdom) Beechdean AMR	(United Kingdom) Andrew Howard (Germany) Immanuel Vinke (United Kingdom) Darren Turner	Aston Martin 4.5 L V8	D	126
26	LMP3	5	(Spain) By Speed Factory	(Germany) Jürgen Krebs (Russia) Timur Boguslavskiy (Switzerland) Giorgio Maggi	Ligier JS P3	MI	109
26	LMP3	5	(Spain) By Speed Factory	(Germany) Jürgen Krebs (Russia) Timur Boguslavskiy (Switzerland) Giorgio Maggi	Nissan VK50 5.0 L V8	MI	109
27	LMP2	25	(Portugal) Algarve Pro Racing	(France) Julien Canal (Mexico) Memo Rojas (France) Nathanaël Berthon	Ligier JS P217	D	103
27	LMP2	25	(Portugal) Algarve Pro Racing	(France) Julien Canal (Mexico) Memo Rojas (France) Nathanaël Berthon	Gibson GK428 4.2 L V8	D	103
DNF	LMP2	39	(France) Graff	(France) Enzo Guibbert (France) Paul Petit (Mexico) Ricardo Sánchez	Oreca 07	D	102
DNF	LMP2	39	(France) Graff	(France) Enzo Guibbert (France) Paul Petit (Mexico) Ricardo Sánchez	Gibson GK428 4.2 L V8	D	102
DNF	GTE	55	(Switzerland) Spirit of Race	(United Kingdom) Duncan Cameron (Republic of Ireland) Matt Griffin (United Kingdom) Aaron Scott	Ferrari 488 GTE	D	73
DNF	GTE	55	(Switzerland) Spirit of Race	(United Kingdom) Duncan Cameron (Republic of Ireland) Matt Griffin (United Kingdom) Aaron Scott	Ferrari F154CB 3.9 L Turbo V8	D	73
DNF	LMP3	10	(Italy) Oregon Team	(Italy) Dario Capitanio (Colombia) Andrés Méndez (Italy) Davide Roda	Norma M30	MI	67
DNF	LMP3	10	(Italy) Oregon Team	(Italy) Dario Capitanio (Colombia) Andrés Méndez (Italy) Davide Roda	Nissan VK50 5.0 L V8	MI	67
DNF	LMP3	19	(France) M.Racing - YMR	(France) Erwin Creed (France) Yann Ehrlacher	Ligier JS P3	MI	51
DNF	LMP3	19	(France) M.Racing - YMR	(France) Erwin Creed (France) Yann Ehrlacher	Nissan VK50 5.0 L V8	MI	51
DNF	LMP3	13	(Poland) Inter Europol Competition	(Germany) Martin Hippe (Poland) Jakub Śmiechowski	Ligier JS P3	MI	25
DNF	LMP3	13	(Poland) Inter Europol Competition	(Germany) Martin Hippe (Poland) Jakub Śmiechowski	Nissan VK50 5.0 L V8	MI	25
DNF	GTE	51	(Switzerland) Spirit of Race	(Italy) Andrea Bertolini (Italy) Gianluca Roda (Italy) Giorgio Roda	Ferrari 488 GTE	D	22
DNF	GTE	51	(Switzerland) Spirit of Race	(Italy) Andrea Bertolini (Italy) Gianluca Roda (Italy) Giorgio Roda	Ferrari F154CB 3.9 L Turbo V8	D	22
DNF	LMP3	16	(France) Panis Barthez Competition	(France) Eric Debard (France) Simon Gachet (United States) Theo Bean	Ligier JS P3	MI	11
DNF	LMP3	16	(France) Panis Barthez Competition	(France) Eric Debard (France) Simon Gachet (United States) Theo Bean	Nissan VK50 5.0 L V8	MI	11
DNF	LMP3	12	(United States) Eurointernational	(Canada) James Dayson (Australia) Ricky Capo (United States) Max Hanratty	Ligier JS P3	MI	9
DNF	LMP3	12	(United States) Eurointernational	(Canada) James Dayson (Australia) Ricky Capo (United States) Max Hanratty	Nissan VK50 5.0 L V8	MI	9

European Le Mans Series
Previous race: Spa-Francorchamps	2017 season	Next race: none
