= 2017 4 Hours of Le Castellet =

Layout of Circuit Paul Ricard

The 2017 4 Hours of Le Castellet was an endurance motor race held at Circuit Paul Ricard in Le Castellet, France on 26–27 August 2017. It was the fourth round of the 2017 European Le Mans Series.

== Race ==
=== Race result ===
Class winners in bold.

Pos	Class	No.	Team	Drivers	Chassis	Tyre	Laps
Pos	Class	No.	Team	Drivers	Engine	Tyre	Laps
1	**LMP2**	**27**	**(Russia) SMP Racing**	**(Russia) Matevos Isaakyan** **(Russia) Matevos Isaakyan**	**Dallara P217**	D	**115**
1	**LMP2**	**27**	**(Russia) SMP Racing**	**(Russia) Matevos Isaakyan** **(Russia) Matevos Isaakyan**	**Gibson GK428 4.2 L V8**	D	**115**
2	LMP2	22	(Russia) G-Drive Racing	(Mexico) Memo Rojas (France) Léo Roussel (France) Nicolas Minassian	Oreca 07	D	115
2	LMP2	22	(Russia) G-Drive Racing	(Mexico) Memo Rojas (France) Léo Roussel (France) Nicolas Minassian	Gibson GK428 4.2 L V8	D	115
3	LMP2	39	(France) Graff	(France) Enzo Guibbert (France) Paul Petit (France) Eric Trouillet	Oreca 07	D	114
3	LMP2	39	(France) Graff	(France) Enzo Guibbert (France) Paul Petit (France) Eric Trouillet	Gibson GK428 4.2 L V8	D	114
4	LMP2	23	(France) Panis Barthez Competition	(France) Fabien Barthez (France) Timothé Buret (France) Nathanaël Berthon	Ligier JS P217	MI	114
4	LMP2	23	(France) Panis Barthez Competition	(France) Fabien Barthez (France) Timothé Buret (France) Nathanaël Berthon	Gibson GK428 4.2 L V8	MI	114
5	LMP2	32	(United States) United Autosports	(Portugal) Filipe Albuquerque (United States) William Owen (Switzerland) Hugo de Sadeleer	Ligier JS P217	D	114
5	LMP2	32	(United States) United Autosports	(Portugal) Filipe Albuquerque (United States) William Owen (Switzerland) Hugo de Sadeleer	Gibson GK428 4.2 L V8	D	114
6	LMP2	40	(France) Graff	(Australia) James Allen (United Kingdom) Richard Bradley (Colombia) Gustavo Yacamán	Oreca 07	D	114
6	LMP2	40	(France) Graff	(Australia) James Allen (United Kingdom) Richard Bradley (Colombia) Gustavo Yacamán	Gibson GK428 4.2 L V8	D	114
7	LMP2	21	(United States) DragonSpeed	(United Kingdom) Ben Hanley (Sweden) Henrik Hedman (France) Nicolas Lapierre	Oreca 07	D	114
7	LMP2	21	(United States) DragonSpeed	(United Kingdom) Ben Hanley (Sweden) Henrik Hedman (France) Nicolas Lapierre	Gibson GK428 4.2 L V8	D	114
8	LMP2	25	(Portugal) Algarve Pro Racing	(France) Julien Canal (Mexico) Memo Rojas (France) Nathanaël Berthon	Ligier JS P217	D	113
8	LMP2	25	(Portugal) Algarve Pro Racing	(France) Julien Canal (Mexico) Memo Rojas (France) Nathanaël Berthon	Gibson GK428 4.2 L V8	D	113
9	LMP2	49	(Denmark) High Class Racing	(Denmark) Dennis Andersen (Denmark) Anders Fjordbach	Dallara P217	D	112
9	LMP2	49	(Denmark) High Class Racing	(Denmark) Dennis Andersen (Denmark) Anders Fjordbach	Gibson GK428 4.2 L V8	D	112
10	LMP2	47	(Italy) Cetilar Villorba Corse	(Italy) Andrea Belicchi (Italy) Roberto Lacorte (Italy) Giorgio Sernagiotto	Dallara P217	D	111
10	LMP2	47	(Italy) Cetilar Villorba Corse	(Italy) Andrea Belicchi (Italy) Roberto Lacorte (Italy) Giorgio Sernagiotto	Gibson GK428 4.2 L V8	D	111
11	LMP2	28	(France) IDEC Sport Racing	(France) Patrice Lafargue (France) Paul Lafargue (France) Olivier Pla	Ligier JS P217	MI	111
11	LMP2	28	(France) IDEC Sport Racing	(France) Patrice Lafargue (France) Paul Lafargue (France) Olivier Pla	Gibson GK428 4.2 L V8	MI	111
12	LMP2	29	(Netherlands) Racing Team Nederland	(Netherlands) Frits van Eerd (Netherlands) Jan Lammers	Dallara P217	D	108
12	LMP2	29	(Netherlands) Racing Team Nederland	(Netherlands) Frits van Eerd (Netherlands) Jan Lammers	Gibson GK428 4.2 L V8	D	108
13	**LMP3**	**2**	**(United States) United Autosports**	**(United States) John Falb** **(United States) Sean Rayhall**	**Ligier JS P3**	MI	**107**
13	**LMP3**	**2**	**(United States) United Autosports**	**(United States) John Falb** **(United States) Sean Rayhall**	**Nissan VK50 5.0 L V8**	MI	**107**
14	LMP3	13	(Poland) Inter Europol Competition	(Germany) Martin Hippe (Poland) Jakub Śmiechowski	Ligier JS P3	MI	107
14	LMP3	13	(Poland) Inter Europol Competition	(Germany) Martin Hippe (Poland) Jakub Śmiechowski	Nissan VK50 5.0 L V8	MI	107
15	LMP3	18	(France) M.Racing - YMR	(France) Alexandre Cougnaud (France) Antoine Jung (France) Romano Ricci	Ligier JS P3	MI	107
15	LMP3	18	(France) M.Racing - YMR	(France) Alexandre Cougnaud (France) Antoine Jung (France) Romano Ricci	Nissan VK50 5.0 L V8	MI	107
16	LMP3	11	(United States) Eurointernational	(Italy) Giorgio Mondini (Italy) Marco Jacoboni	Ligier JS P3	MI	107
16	LMP3	11	(United States) Eurointernational	(Italy) Giorgio Mondini (Italy) Marco Jacoboni	Nissan VK50 5.0 L V8	MI	107
17	LMP3	16	(France) Panis Barthez Competition	(France) Eric Debard (France) Simon Gachet (United States) Theo Bean	Ligier JS P3	MI	107
17	LMP3	16	(France) Panis Barthez Competition	(France) Eric Debard (France) Simon Gachet (United States) Theo Bean	Nissan VK50 5.0 L V8	MI	107
18	LMP3	17	(France) Ultimate	(France) François Hériau (France) Jean-Baptiste Lahaye (France) Matthieu Lahaye	Ligier JS P3	MI	107
18	LMP3	17	(France) Ultimate	(France) François Hériau (France) Jean-Baptiste Lahaye (France) Matthieu Lahaye	Nissan VK50 5.0 L V8	MI	107
19	**GTE**	**55**	**(Switzerland) Spirit of Race**	**(United Kingdom) Duncan Cameron** **(Republic of Ireland) Matt Griffin** **(United Kingdom) Aaron Scott**	**Ferrari 488 GTE**	D	**106**
19	**GTE**	**55**	**(Switzerland) Spirit of Race**	**(United Kingdom) Duncan Cameron** **(Republic of Ireland) Matt Griffin** **(United Kingdom) Aaron Scott**	**Ferrari F154CB 3.9 L Turbo V8**	D	**106**
20	LMP3	15	(United Kingdom) RLR MSport	(Denmark) Morten Dons (Canada) John Farano (United Kingdom) Alex Kapadia	Ligier JS P3	MI	106
20	LMP3	15	(United Kingdom) RLR MSport	(Denmark) Morten Dons (Canada) John Farano (United Kingdom) Alex Kapadia	Nissan VK50 5.0 L V8	MI	106
21	GTE	90	(United Kingdom) TF Sport	(United Kingdom) Euan Hankey (Denmark) Nicki Thiim (Turkey) Salih Yoluc	Aston Martin Vantage GTE	D	106
21	GTE	90	(United Kingdom) TF Sport	(United Kingdom) Euan Hankey (Denmark) Nicki Thiim (Turkey) Salih Yoluc	Aston Martin 4.5 L V8	D	106
22	GTE	66	(United Kingdom) JMW Motorsport	(United Kingdom) Jody Fannin (United Kingdom) Robert Smith (United Kingdom) Jonny Cocker	Ferrari 458 Italia GT2	D	106
22	GTE	66	(United Kingdom) JMW Motorsport	(United Kingdom) Jody Fannin (United Kingdom) Robert Smith (United Kingdom) Jonny Cocker	Ferrari 4.5 L V8	D	106
23	GTE	51	(Switzerland) Spirit of Race	(Italy) Andrea Bertolini (Italy) Gianluca Roda (Italy) Giorgio Roda	Ferrari 488 GTE	D	106
23	GTE	51	(Switzerland) Spirit of Race	(Italy) Andrea Bertolini (Italy) Gianluca Roda (Italy) Giorgio Roda	Ferrari F154CB 3.9 L Turbo V8	D	106
24	GTE	99	(United Kingdom) Beechdean AMR	(United Kingdom) Andrew Howard (United Kingdom) Ross Gunn (United Kingdom) Darren Turner	Aston Martin Vantage GTE	D	106
24	GTE	99	(United Kingdom) Beechdean AMR	(United Kingdom) Andrew Howard (United Kingdom) Ross Gunn (United Kingdom) Darren Turner	Aston Martin 4.5 L V8	D	106
25	LMP3	12	(United States) Eurointernational	(Italy) Andrea Dromedari (Australia) Ricky Capo (United States) Max Hanratty	Ligier JS P3	MI	106
25	LMP3	12	(United States) Eurointernational	(Italy) Andrea Dromedari (Australia) Ricky Capo (United States) Max Hanratty	Nissan VK50 5.0 L V8	MI	106
26	GTE	77	(Germany) Proton Competition	(Italy) Matteo Cairoli (Switzerland) Joël Camathias (Germany) Christian Ried	Porsche 911 RSR	D	105
26	GTE	77	(Germany) Proton Competition	(Italy) Matteo Cairoli (Switzerland) Joël Camathias (Germany) Christian Ried	Porsche 4.0 L Flat-6	D	105
27	LMP3	5	(Spain) By Speed Factory	(Germany) Jürgen Krebs (Switzerland) Tim Müller	Ligier JS P3	MI	103
27	LMP3	5	(Spain) By Speed Factory	(Germany) Jürgen Krebs (Switzerland) Tim Müller	Nissan VK50 5.0 L V8	MI	103
28	LMP3	4	(France) Cool Racing by GPC	(Switzerland) Iradj Alexander (Switzerland) Alexandre Coigny	Ligier JS P3	MI	98
28	LMP3	4	(France) Cool Racing by GPC	(Switzerland) Iradj Alexander (Switzerland) Alexandre Coigny	Nissan VK50 5.0 L V8	MI	98
DNF	LMP3	19	(France) M.Racing - YMR	(France) Erwin Creed (France) Yann Ehrlacher	Ligier JS P3	MI	97
DNF	LMP3	19	(France) M.Racing - YMR	(France) Erwin Creed (France) Yann Ehrlacher	Nissan VK50 5.0 L V8	MI	97
DNF	LMP3	6	(United Kingdom) 360 Racing	(United Kingdom) Ross Kaiser (United Kingdom) Anthony Wells (United Kingdom) Terrence Woodward	Ligier JS P3	MI	88
DNF	LMP3	6	(United Kingdom) 360 Racing	(United Kingdom) Ross Kaiser (United Kingdom) Anthony Wells (United Kingdom) Terrence Woodward	Nissan VK50 5.0 L V8	MI	88
DNF	LMP3	10	(Italy) Oregon Team	(Italy) Dario Capitanio (Colombia) Andrés Méndez (Italy) Davide Roda	Norma M30	MI	87
DNF	LMP3	10	(Italy) Oregon Team	(Italy) Dario Capitanio (Colombia) Andrés Méndez (Italy) Davide Roda	Nissan VK50 5.0 L V8	MI	87
DNF	LMP3	7	(France) Duqueine Engineering	(Switzerland) Antonin Borga (Switzerland) David Droux (France) Nicolas Schatz	Norma M30	MI	75
DNF	LMP3	7	(France) Duqueine Engineering	(Switzerland) Antonin Borga (Switzerland) David Droux (France) Nicolas Schatz	Nissan VK50 5.0 L V8	MI	75
DNF	LMP3	8	(France) Duqueine Engineering	(France) Vincent Beltoise (France) Nicolas Melin (Switzerland) Lucas Légeret	Norma M30	MI	42
DNF	LMP3	8	(France) Duqueine Engineering	(France) Vincent Beltoise (France) Nicolas Melin (Switzerland) Lucas Légeret	Nissan VK50 5.0 L V8	MI	42
DNF	LMP3	9	(Austria) AT Racing	(Belarus) Alexander Talkanitsa, Jr. (Belarus) Alexander Talkanitsa, Sr. (Denmark) Mikkel Jensen	Ligier JS P3	MI	24
DNF	LMP3	9	(Austria) AT Racing	(Belarus) Alexander Talkanitsa, Jr. (Belarus) Alexander Talkanitsa, Sr. (Denmark) Mikkel Jensen	Nissan VK50 5.0 L V8	MI	24
DNF	LMP3	3	(United States) United Autosports	(United Kingdom) Christian England (United Kingdom) Wayne Boyd (United States) Mark Patterson	Ligier JS P3	MI	7
DNF	LMP3	3	(United States) United Autosports	(United Kingdom) Christian England (United Kingdom) Wayne Boyd (United States) Mark Patterson	Nissan VK50 5.0 L V8	MI	7

European Le Mans Series
Previous race: Red Bull Ring	2017 season	Next race: Spa-Francorchamps
