= 2017 4 Hours of Monza =

Layout of Autodromo Nazionale di Monza

The 2017 4 Hours of Monza was an endurance motor race held at Autodromo Nazionale di Monza in Monza, Italy on 13–14 May 2017. It was the second round of the 2017 European Le Mans Series.

== Race ==
=== Race result ===
Class winners in bold.

Pos	Class	No.	Team	Drivers	Chassis	Tyre	Laps
Pos	Class	No.	Team	Drivers	Engine	Tyre	Laps
1	**LMP2**	**22**	**(Russia) G-Drive Racing**	**(Mexico) Memo Rojas** **(France) Léo Roussel** **(Japan) Ryō Hirakawa**	**Oreca 07**	D	**132**
1	**LMP2**	**22**	**(Russia) G-Drive Racing**	**(Mexico) Memo Rojas** **(France) Léo Roussel** **(Japan) Ryō Hirakawa**	**Gibson GK428 4.2 L V8**	D	**132**
2	LMP2	21	(United States) DragonSpeed	(United Kingdom) Ben Hanley (Sweden) Henrik Hedman (France) Nicolas Lapierre	Oreca 07	D	132
2	LMP2	21	(United States) DragonSpeed	(United Kingdom) Ben Hanley (Sweden) Henrik Hedman (France) Nicolas Lapierre	Gibson GK428 4.2 L V8	D	132
3	LMP2	49	(Denmark) High Class Racing	(Denmark) Dennis Andersen (Denmark) Anders Fjordbach	Dallara P217	D	132
3	LMP2	49	(Denmark) High Class Racing	(Denmark) Dennis Andersen (Denmark) Anders Fjordbach	Gibson GK428 4.2 L V8	D	132
4	LMP2	39	(France) Graff	(France) Enzo Guibbert (France) Paul Petit (France) Eric Trouillet	Oreca 07	D	132
4	LMP2	39	(France) Graff	(France) Enzo Guibbert (France) Paul Petit (France) Eric Trouillet	Gibson GK428 4.2 L V8	D	132
5	LMP2	47	(Italy) Cetilar Villorba Corse	(Italy) Andrea Belicchi (Italy) Roberto Lacorte (Italy) Giorgio Sernagiotto	Dallara P217	D	132
5	LMP2	47	(Italy) Cetilar Villorba Corse	(Italy) Andrea Belicchi (Italy) Roberto Lacorte (Italy) Giorgio Sernagiotto	Gibson GK428 4.2 L V8	D	132
6	LMP2	32	(United States) United Autosports	(Portugal) Filipe Albuquerque (United States) William Owen (Switzerland) Hugo de Sadeleer	Ligier JS P217	D	132
6	LMP2	32	(United States) United Autosports	(Portugal) Filipe Albuquerque (United States) William Owen (Switzerland) Hugo de Sadeleer	Gibson GK428 4.2 L V8	D	132
7	LMP2	23	(France) Panis Barthez Competition	(France) Fabien Barthez (France) Timothé Buret	Ligier JS P217	MI	132
7	LMP2	23	(France) Panis Barthez Competition	(France) Fabien Barthez (France) Timothé Buret	Gibson GK428 4.2 L V8	MI	132
8	LMP2	40	(France) Graff	(Australia) James Allen (United Kingdom) Richard Bradley (France) Franck Matelli	Oreca 07	D	131
8	LMP2	40	(France) Graff	(Australia) James Allen (United Kingdom) Richard Bradley (France) Franck Matelli	Gibson GK428 4.2 L V8	D	131
9	LMP2	28	(France) IDEC Sport Racing	(France) Patrice Lafargue (France) Paul Lafargue (France) Olivier Pla	Ligier JS P217	MI	129
9	LMP2	28	(France) IDEC Sport Racing	(France) Patrice Lafargue (France) Paul Lafargue (France) Olivier Pla	Gibson GK428 4.2 L V8	MI	129
10	LMP2	29	(Netherlands) Racing Team Nederland	(Netherlands) Frits van Eerd (Netherlands) Jan Lammers	Dallara P217	D	127
10	LMP2	29	(Netherlands) Racing Team Nederland	(Netherlands) Frits van Eerd (Netherlands) Jan Lammers	Gibson GK428 4.2 L V8	D	127
11	**LMP3**	**19**	**(France) M.Racing - YMR**	**(France) Erwin Creed** **(Australia) Ricky Capo**	**Ligier JS P3**	MI	**124**
11	**LMP3**	**19**	**(France) M.Racing - YMR**	**(France) Erwin Creed** **(Australia) Ricky Capo**	**Nissan VK50 5.0 L V8**	MI	**124**
12	LMP3	18	(France) M.Racing - YMR	(France) Alexandre Cougnaud (France) Antoine Jung (France) Romano Ricci	Ligier JS P3	MI	123
12	LMP3	18	(France) M.Racing - YMR	(France) Alexandre Cougnaud (France) Antoine Jung (France) Romano Ricci	Nissan VK50 5.0 L V8	MI	123
13	LMP3	17	(France) Ultimate	(France) François Hériau (France) Jean-Baptiste Lahaye (France) Matthieu Lahaye	Ligier JS P3	MI	123
13	LMP3	17	(France) Ultimate	(France) François Hériau (France) Jean-Baptiste Lahaye (France) Matthieu Lahaye	Nissan VK50 5.0 L V8	MI	123
14	LMP3	3	(United States) United Autosports	(United Kingdom) Christian England (United Kingdom) Wayne Boyd (United States) Mark Patterson	Ligier JS P3	MI	123
14	LMP3	3	(United States) United Autosports	(United Kingdom) Christian England (United Kingdom) Wayne Boyd (United States) Mark Patterson	Nissan VK50 5.0 L V8	MI	123
15	LMP3	11	(United States) Eurointernational	(Italy) Giorgio Mondini (Italy) Davide Uboldi	Ligier JS P3	MI	123
15	LMP3	11	(United States) Eurointernational	(Italy) Giorgio Mondini (Italy) Davide Uboldi	Nissan VK50 5.0 L V8	MI	123
16	LMP3	13	(Poland) Inter Europol Competition	(Germany) Martin Hippe (Poland) Jakub Śmiechowski	Ligier JS P3	MI	123
16	LMP3	13	(Poland) Inter Europol Competition	(Germany) Martin Hippe (Poland) Jakub Śmiechowski	Nissan VK50 5.0 L V8	MI	123
17	LMP3	6	(United Kingdom) 360 Racing	(United Kingdom) Ross Kaiser (United Kingdom) Anthony Wells (United Kingdom) Terrence Woodward	Ligier JS P3	MI	122
17	LMP3	6	(United Kingdom) 360 Racing	(United Kingdom) Ross Kaiser (United Kingdom) Anthony Wells (United Kingdom) Terrence Woodward	Nissan VK50 5.0 L V8	MI	122
18	LMP3	7	(France) Duqueine Engineering	(Switzerland) Antonin Borga (Switzerland) David Droux (France) Nicolas Schatz	Ligier JS P3	MI	122
18	LMP3	7	(France) Duqueine Engineering	(Switzerland) Antonin Borga (Switzerland) David Droux (France) Nicolas Schatz	Nissan VK50 5.0 L V8	MI	122
19	LMP3	2	(United States) United Autosports	(United States) John Falb (United States) Sean Rayhall	Ligier JS P3	MI	122
19	LMP3	2	(United States) United Autosports	(United States) John Falb (United States) Sean Rayhall	Nissan VK50 5.0 L V8	MI	122
20	LMP3	15	(United Kingdom) RLR MSport	(Denmark) Morten Dons (Canada) John Farano (United Kingdom) Alex Kapadia	Ligier JS P3	MI	122
20	LMP3	15	(United Kingdom) RLR MSport	(Denmark) Morten Dons (Canada) John Farano (United Kingdom) Alex Kapadia	Nissan VK50 5.0 L V8	MI	122
21	**GTE**	**66**	**(United Kingdom) JMW Motorsport**	**(United Kingdom) Jody Fannin** **(United Kingdom) Robert Smith** **(United Kingdom) Jonny Cocker**	**Ferrari 458 Italia GT2**	D	**121**
21	**GTE**	**66**	**(United Kingdom) JMW Motorsport**	**(United Kingdom) Jody Fannin** **(United Kingdom) Robert Smith** **(United Kingdom) Jonny Cocker**	**Ferrari 4.5 L V8**	D	**121**
22	GTE	90	(United Kingdom) TF Sport	(United Kingdom) Euan Hankey (Denmark) Nicki Thiim (Turkey) Salih Yoluc	Aston Martin Vantage GTE	D	121
22	GTE	90	(United Kingdom) TF Sport	(United Kingdom) Euan Hankey (Denmark) Nicki Thiim (Turkey) Salih Yoluc	Aston Martin 4.5 L V8	D	121
23	GTE	99	(United Kingdom) Beechdean AMR	(United Kingdom) Andrew Howard (United Kingdom) Ross Gunn (United Kingdom) Darren Turner	Aston Martin Vantage GTE	D	121
23	GTE	99	(United Kingdom) Beechdean AMR	(United Kingdom) Andrew Howard (United Kingdom) Ross Gunn (United Kingdom) Darren Turner	Aston Martin 4.5 L V8	D	121
24	LMP3	16	(France) Panis Barthez Competition	(France) Eric Debard (France) Simon Gachet (United States) Theo Bean	Ligier JS P3	MI	121
24	LMP3	16	(France) Panis Barthez Competition	(France) Eric Debard (France) Simon Gachet (United States) Theo Bean	Nissan VK50 5.0 L V8	MI	121
25	GTE	51	(Switzerland) Spirit of Race	(Italy) Andrea Bertolini (Italy) Gianluca Roda (Italy) Giorgio Roda	Ferrari 488 GTE	D	121
25	GTE	51	(Switzerland) Spirit of Race	(Italy) Andrea Bertolini (Italy) Gianluca Roda (Italy) Giorgio Roda	Ferrari F154CB 3.9 L Turbo V8	D	121
26	GTE	77	(Germany) Proton Competition	(Italy) Matteo Cairoli (Switzerland) Joël Camathias (Germany) Christian Ried	Porsche 911 RSR	D	120
26	GTE	77	(Germany) Proton Competition	(Italy) Matteo Cairoli (Switzerland) Joël Camathias (Germany) Christian Ried	Porsche 4.0 L Flat-6	D	120
27	LMP3	12	(United States) Eurointernational	(Italy) Andrea Dromedari (United States) Max Hanratty (France) Maxime Pialat	Ligier JS P3	MI	120
27	LMP3	12	(United States) Eurointernational	(Italy) Andrea Dromedari (United States) Max Hanratty (France) Maxime Pialat	Nissan VK50 5.0 L V8	MI	120
28	GTE	50	(France) Larbre Compétition	(France) Romain Brandela (France) Christian Philippon (Brazil) Fernando Rees	Chevrolet Corvette C7.R	D	120
28	GTE	50	(France) Larbre Compétition	(France) Romain Brandela (France) Christian Philippon (Brazil) Fernando Rees	Chevrolet LT5.5 5.5 L V8	D	120
29	LMP3	8	(France) Duqueine Engineering	(France) Vincent Beltoise (France) Henry Hassid (Switzerland) Lucas Légeret	Ligier JS P3	MI	119
29	LMP3	8	(France) Duqueine Engineering	(France) Vincent Beltoise (France) Henry Hassid (Switzerland) Lucas Légeret	Nissan VK50 5.0 L V8	MI	119
30	LMP2	34	(United Kingdom) Tockwith Motorsports	(United Kingdom) Phil Hanson (United Kingdom) Nigel Moore	Ligier JS P217	D	115
30	LMP2	34	(United Kingdom) Tockwith Motorsports	(United Kingdom) Phil Hanson (United Kingdom) Nigel Moore	Gibson GK428 4.2 L V8	D	115
31	LMP3	4	(France) Cool Racing by GPC	(Switzerland) Iradj Alexander (Switzerland) Gino Forgione (Switzerland) Alexandre Coigny	Ligier JS P3	MI	111
31	LMP3	4	(France) Cool Racing by GPC	(Switzerland) Iradj Alexander (Switzerland) Gino Forgione (Switzerland) Alexandre Coigny	Nissan VK50 5.0 L V8	MI	111
32	LMP3	10	(Italy) Oregon Team	(Italy) Dario Capitanio (Colombia) Andrés Méndez (Italy) Davide Roda	Norma M30	MI	105
32	LMP3	10	(Italy) Oregon Team	(Italy) Dario Capitanio (Colombia) Andrés Méndez (Italy) Davide Roda	Nissan VK50 5.0 L V8	MI	105
33	LMP3	5	(Spain) By Speed Factory	(Germany) Jürgen Krebs (Switzerland) Tim Müller (Estonia) Tristan Viidas	Ligier JS P3	MI	102
33	LMP3	5	(Spain) By Speed Factory	(Germany) Jürgen Krebs (Switzerland) Tim Müller (Estonia) Tristan Viidas	Nissan VK50 5.0 L V8	MI	102
DNF	LMP2	25	(Portugal) Algarve Pro Racing	(France) Julien Canal (Mexico) Memo Rojas (France) Nathanaël Berthon	Ligier JS P217	D	131
DNF	LMP2	25	(Portugal) Algarve Pro Racing	(France) Julien Canal (Mexico) Memo Rojas (France) Nathanaël Berthon	Gibson GK428 4.2 L V8	D	131
DNF	GTE	55	(Switzerland) Spirit of Race	(United Kingdom) Duncan Cameron (Republic of Ireland) Matt Griffin (United Kingdom) Aaron Scott	Ferrari 488 GTE	D	55
DNF	GTE	55	(Switzerland) Spirit of Race	(United Kingdom) Duncan Cameron (Republic of Ireland) Matt Griffin (United Kingdom) Aaron Scott	Ferrari F154CB 3.9 L Turbo V8	D	55
DNF	LMP3	9	(Austria) AT Racing	(Belarus) Alexander Talkanitsa, Jr. (Belarus) Alexander Talkanitsa, Sr. (Italy) Maurizio Mediani	Ligier JS P3	MI	17
DNF	LMP3	9	(Austria) AT Racing	(Belarus) Alexander Talkanitsa, Jr. (Belarus) Alexander Talkanitsa, Sr. (Italy) Maurizio Mediani	Nissan VK50 5.0 L V8	MI	17

European Le Mans Series
Previous race: Silverstone	2017 season	Next race: Red Bull Ring
