= Morten Dons =

Danish racing driver

- Nationality: (Denmark) Danish
- Born: Morten Dons Andersen; 29 December 1988 (age 37) Struer, Denmark

European Le Mans Series career
- Debut season: 2015
- Current team: University of Bolton
- Categorisation: FIA Silver
- Car number: 7
- Starts: 1
- Wins: 1
- Poles: 0
- Fastest laps: 0

Previous series
- 2014 2013 2012 2011-12 2006-09: British GT; Ginetta GT5 Challenge Sweden; Formula Ford NEZ; Formula Ford Denmark; Karting

Championship titles
- 2013: Ginetta GT5 Challenge Sweden

Morten Dons Andersen (born 29 December 1988) is a Danish racing driver currently competing in the European Le Mans Series. He made his debut in 2015. Having previously competed in the British GT and Ginetta GT5 Challenge Sweden amongst others.

== Racing career ==
Dons began his career in 2006 in karting. In 2011 he switched to the Danish Formula Ford championship, he raced there from 2011–2012 ending 3rd in the standings in 2012. He also competed in the Formula Ford NEZ championship that year. He switched to the Ginetta GT5 Challenge Sweden for the 2013 season, he won the championship that year, with 95 points.

In February 2014, it was announced that Dons would make his British GT debut with Century Motorsport driving a Ginetta G55 GT4, partnering Aleksander Schjerpen. They ended the championship 5th in the GT4 standings.

In May 2015, Dons switched to the European Le Mans Series, driving a Ginetta Juno LMP3 for the University of Bolton team, partnering Rob Garofall.

== Racing record ==
=== Complete British GT Championship results ===
(key) (Races in bold indicate pole position) (Races in italics indicate fastest lap)

Year	Team	Car	Class	1	2	3	4	5	6	7	8	9	10	DC	Points
2014	Century Motorsport	Ginetta G55 GT4	GT4	OUL; 1; 23	OUL; 2; 20	ROC; 1 Ret	SIL; 1; 21	SNE; 1; 21	SNE; 2; 19	SPA; 1; 27	SPA; 2 Ret	BRH; 1; 22	DON; 1; 22†	5th	104

=== Complete European Le Mans Series results ===
Year	Entrant	Class	Chassis	Engine	1	2	3	4	5	Rank	Points
2015	University of Bolton	LMP3	Ginetta LMP3	Nissan VK50 5L V8	SIL	IMO; 1	RBR	LEC	EST	6th*	25*

^{*} Season still in progress.
