= Alexander West =

Swedish racing driver (born 1965)

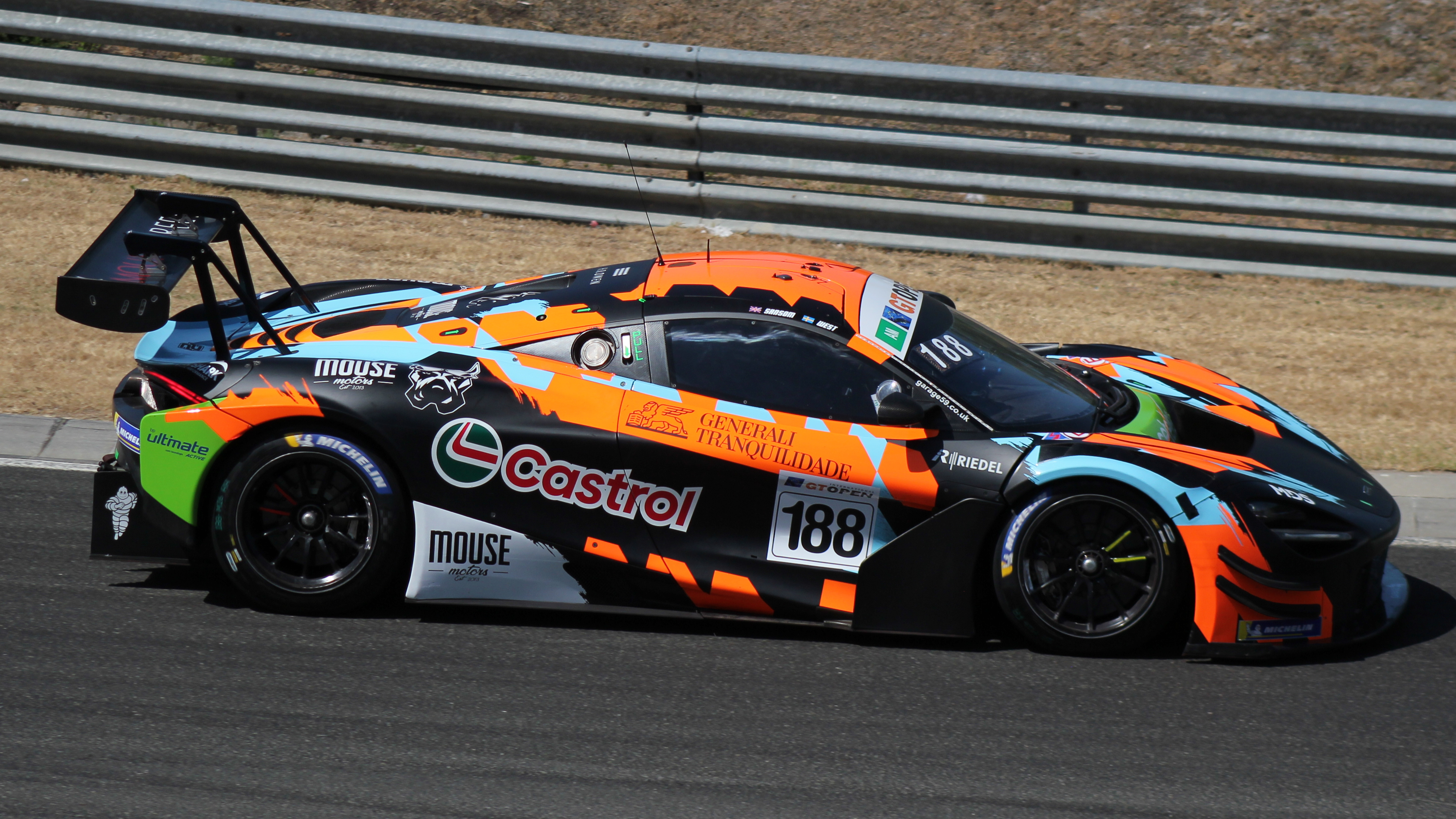
- West in 2025
- Nationality: (Sweden) Swedish
- Born: Alexander Gustav Lennart West; 7 November 1965 (age 61) Helsinki, Finland
- Categorisation: FIA Bronze

Championship titles
- 2020: GT World Challenge Europe Endurance Cup – Pro-Am

Alexander Gustav Lennart West (born 7 November 1965) is a Hong Kong-based Swedish businessman and racing driver. The co-owner of Garage 59, he currently competes for the McLaren customer team in the LMGT3 class of the FIA World Endurance Championship.

== Business ventures ==
Born in the Finnish capital of Helsinki, West grew up in Sweden, where he graduated from the Stockholm School of Economics in 1990, before joining Investor AB five years later as its president. After leaving the company in 2000, West established Hong Kong-based Hedge fund manager Blue Pool Capital in 2004 with Joseph Tsai.

Alongside his career in finance, West is also an avid car collector, most notably owning Felipe Massa's Ferrari F2008, a Ferrari 499P Modificata and a Ferrari FXX-K among others.

== Racing career ==
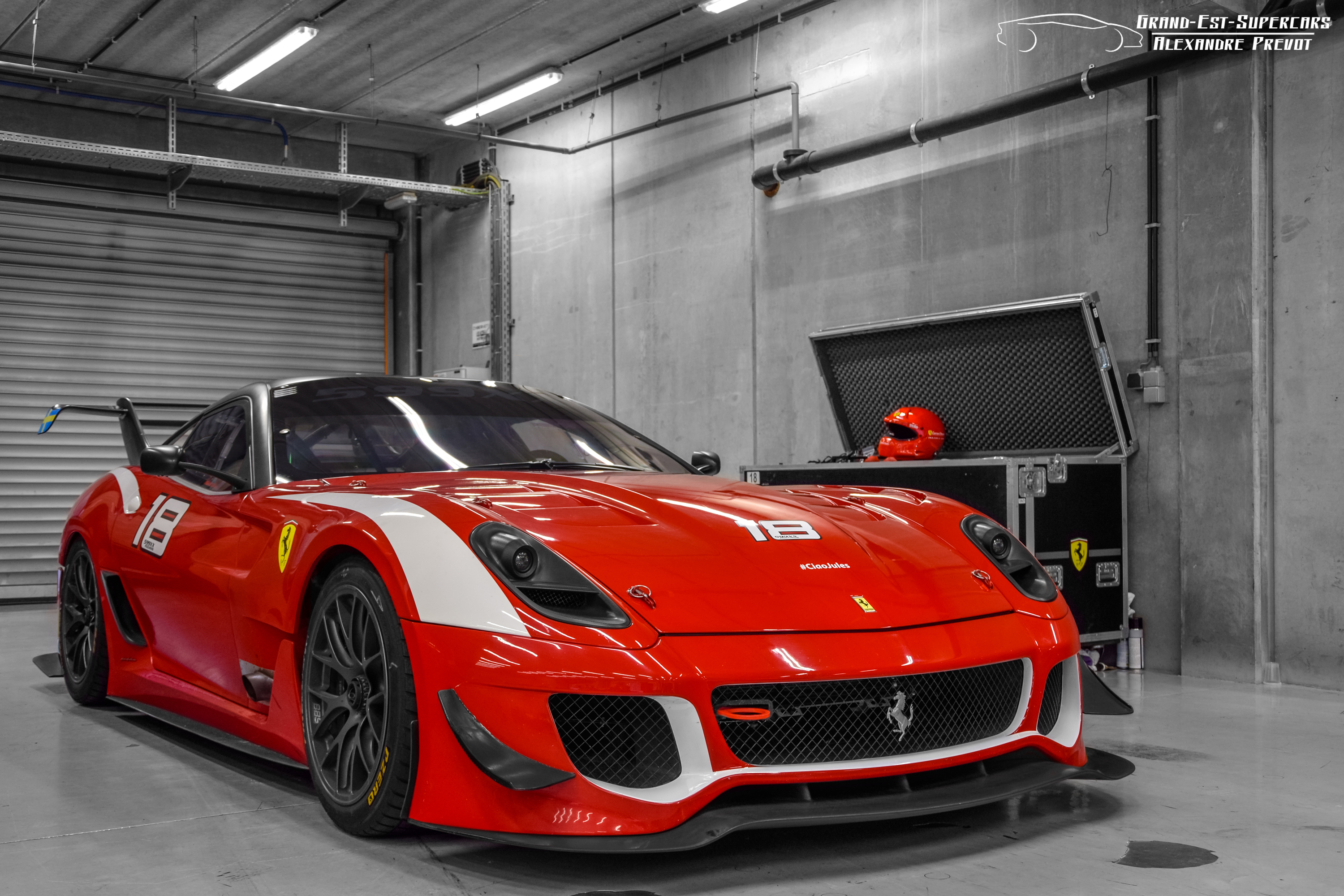
The Ferrari 599XX Evo of West in 2015.

West made his car racing debut in 2015, primarily racing in Ferrari Challenge Asia Pacific, in which he scored two class wins at Sepang and finished fourth in the Trofeo Pirelli standings. During 2015, West also raced part-time in the Maserati Trofeo World Series, in which he scored a lone podium at Suzuka.

West made his GT3 debut in 2016, driving in International GT Open for Garage 59, a new team born from the ashes of CRS Racing. Aboard a McLaren 650S GT3, West scored a lone overall win at Monza with Côme Ledogar and three other podiums to take sixth in Pro-Am. During 2016, West also briefly returned to Ferrari Challenge Asia Pacific, as well as making a one-off appearance in Ferrari Challenge Europe. Returning to International GT Open for 2017, West and Ledogar took class wins at the Hungaroring and Monza to secure third in points. During 2017, West also made select appearances in the Blancpain GT Series Endurance Cup and the Le Mans Cup with Garage 59.

Continuing with the team for 2018, West primarily raced in the Am class of the Blancpain GT Series Endurance Cup, taking wins at Silverstone and Le Castellet to secure runner-up honours. In parallel, West also raced for Ferrari-fielding Luzich Racing in International GT Open, scoring four Pro-Am podiums as he ended the season sixth in points. He also raced at the Bathurst 12 Hour for McLaren-fielding YNA Autosport, as well as racing in the FIA GT Nations Cup, representing Sweden alongside Victor Bouveng. After making his LMP3 debut with them at the Le Mans Cup season finale, West remained with AF Corse-run Spirit of Race to compete in the LMP2 class of the 2018–19 Asian Le Mans Series. In his first season in the series, West won on debut at Shanghai en route to a fifth-place points finish, despite missing the round in Thailand due to "family commitments".

In 2019, West formally joined Chris Goodwin and Andrew Kirkaldy in the leadership structure of Garage 59. The season saw West and Goodwin share a car with Chris Harris in the Blancpain GT Series Endurance Cup, as the team switched to an Aston Martin Vantage AMR GT3. Racing in the Am class, the trio scored a lone class win at Le Castellet and three other podiums to once again finish runner-up in points. The following year, West and Goodwin continued to race together in the newly-renamed GT World Challenge Europe Endurance Cup, albeit in Pro-Am. The pair took wins at Imola (with Jonny Adam) and Le Castellet (with Marvin Kirchhöfer), as well as finishing third at the 24 Hours of Spa to clinch the class title. During 2020, West also competed in select rounds of the European Le Mans Series and the 24 Hours of Le Mans for Ferrari-affiliated AF Corse, in LMGTE and LMGTE Am respectively.

Remaining an owner-driver for 2021, West raced with Garage 59 in the GT class of the Asian Le Mans Series, as well as a dual campaign in the Pro-Am class of the GT World Challenge Europe Endurance and Sprint Cups. In the four-race Asian Le Mans Series at the start of the year, West took a best result of third in race two at Dubai en route to a fifth-place points finish. Following that, West won at Monza in the Endurance Cup to take seventh in points, whereas in the Sprint Cup, he won at Misano and racked up six other podiums to finish fourth in Pro-Am.

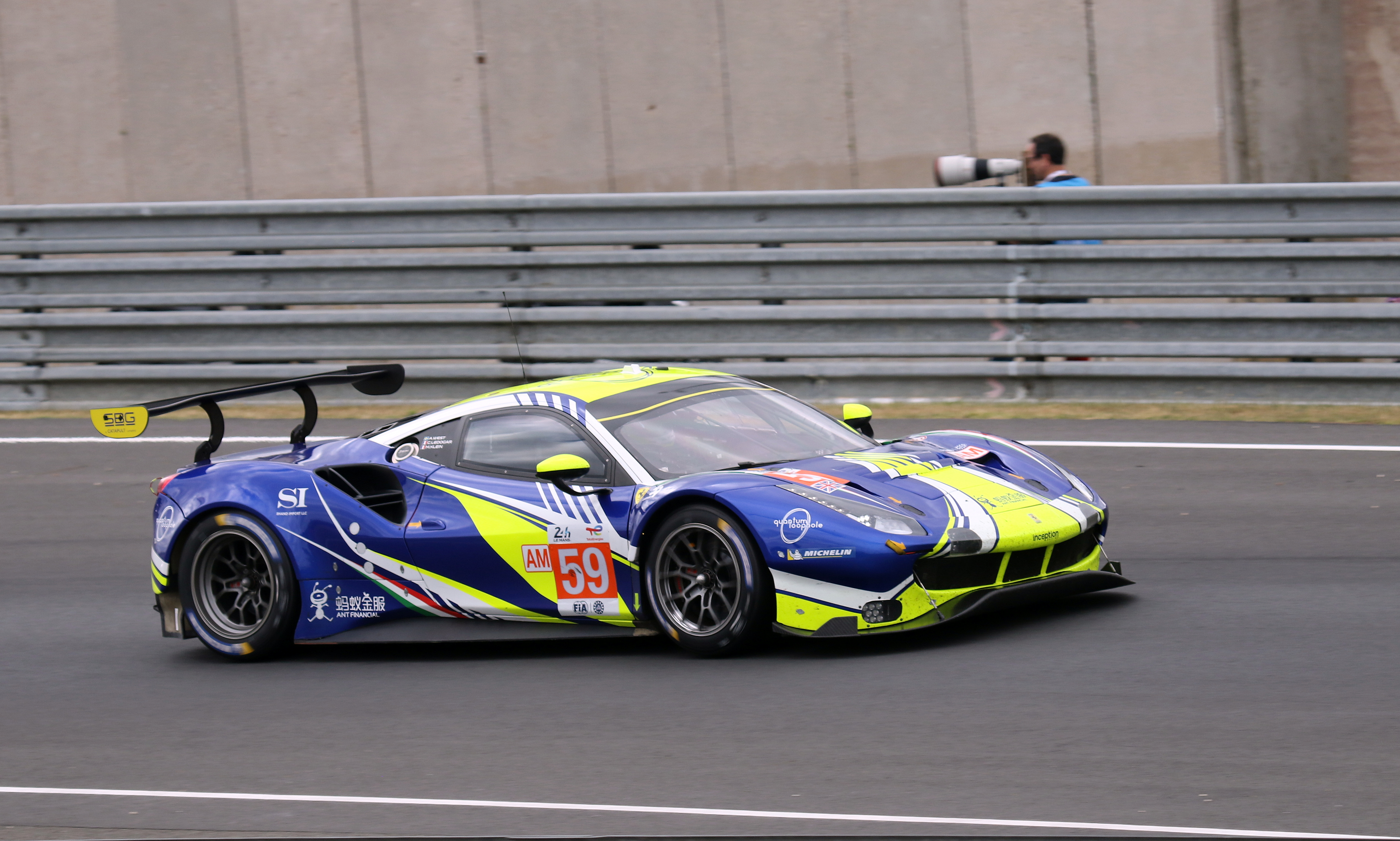
West's Inception Racing Ferrari at the 2022 24 Hours of Le Mans.

The following year, West continued to race in the Asian Le Mans Series and the GT World Challenge Europe Endurance Cup, as Garage 59 reverted back to McLaren machinery. After scoring a lone podium at Abu Dhabi and finishing seventh in the former's GT standings, he took three podiums in the latter to secure third in Pro-Am. During 2022, West also returned to the 24 Hours of Le Mans, driving a Ferrari 488 GTE Evo for Inception Racing in the LMGTE Am class, in a partnership with Garage 59. In 2023, West only raced in the Asian Le Mans Series and select rounds of the British GT Championship, most notably scoring an overall podium at Oulton Park in the latter series. West then won the 2024 Gulf 12 Hours in GT3 Pro-Am with Garage 59, before running a part-time schedule in International GT Open. Racing mainly in the Am class, West won at the Hockenheimring and took three other podiums to finish fifth in points. At the end of the year, West returned to the Gulf 12 Hours, winning it in the Am class alongside Marco Pulcini, Mark Sansom and James Vowles.

In 2026, West joined Garage 59 for its debut in the LMGT3 class of the FIA World Endurance Championship, partnering Benjamin Goethe and Finn Gehrsitz. In his first season in the WEC, West took a best result of fifth at the 6 Hours of Spa-Francorchamps en route to 19th in the LMGT3 standings.

== Racing record ==
=== Racing career summary ===
| Season | Series | Team | Races | Wins | Poles | F/Laps | Podiums | Points | Position |
|---|---|---|---|---|---|---|---|---|---|
| 2015 | Ferrari Challenge Asia Pacific – Trofeo Pirelli | | 6 | 2 | 4 | 5 | 3 | 76 | 4th |
| 2015 | Maserati Trofeo World Series | | 4 | 0 | 0 | 0 | 1 | 25 | 10th |
| 2016 | International GT Open – Pro-Am | Garage 59 | 14 | 1 | 0 | 0 | 4 | 38 | 6th |
| 2016 | Ferrari Challenge Europe – Coppa Shell Am | Scuderia Autoropa | 2 | 0 | 0 | 0 | 0 | 7 | 23rd |
| 2016 | Ferrari Challenge Asia Pacific – Trofeo Pirelli | | | | | | | | |
| 2017 | International GT Open – Pro-Am | Garage 59 | 14 | 2 | 0 | 0 | 6 | 60 | **3rd** |
| 2017 | Blancpain GT Series Endurance Cup – Am | Garage 59 | 2 | 0 | 0 | 0 | 0 | 12 | 20th |
| 2017 | Intercontinental GT Challenge | Garage 59 | 1 | 0 | 0 | 0 | 0 | 0 | NC |
| 2017 | Le Mans Cup – GT3 | Garage 59 | 2 | 0 | 0 | 0 | 0 | 7 | 14th |
| 2018 | Bathurst 12 Hour – APA | YNA Autosport | 1 | 0 | 0 | 0 | 0 | —N/a | 5th |
| 2018 | International GT Open – Pro-Am | Luzich Racing | 14 | 0 | 0 | 0 | 4 | 37 | 6th |
| 2018 | Intercontinental GT Challenge | YNA Autosport | 1 | 0 | 0 | 0 | 0 | 4 | 23rd |
| 2018 | Intercontinental GT Challenge | Garage 59 | 1 | 0 | 0 | 0 | 0 | 4 | 23rd |
| 2018 | Blancpain GT Series Endurance Cup – Am | Garage 59 | 5 | 2 | 2 | 3 | 2 | 92 | **2nd** |
| 2018 | Le Mans Cup – LMP3 | Graff | 1 | 0 | 0 | 0 | 0 | 0.5 | 49th |
| 2018 | FIA GT Nations Cup | Team Sweden | 1 | 0 | 0 | 0 | 0 | —N/a | DNF |
| 2018–19 | Asian Le Mans Series – LMP2 | Spirit of Race | 3 | 1 | 0 | 0 | 1 | 45 | 5th |
| 2019 | Blancpain GT Series Endurance Cup – Am | Garage 59 | 5 | 1 | 1 | 0 | 4 | 99 | **2nd** |
| 2019 | VLN Series – SP8 | Aston Martin Racing | 3 | 1 | 0 | 0 | 2 | 19.17 | 7th |
| 2019 | VLN Series – SP8T | Aston Martin Racing | 1 | 0 | 0 | 0 | 0 | 2.14 | 40th |
| 2020 | Bathurst 12 Hour – APA | Garage 59 | 1 | 0 | 0 | 0 | 0 | —N/a | DNF |
| 2020 | Intercontinental GT Challenge | Garage 59 | 1 | 0 | 0 | 0 | 0 | 0 | NC |
| 2020 | European Le Mans Series – LMGTE | AF Corse | 3 | 0 | 0 | 0 | 0 | 20 | 13th |
| 2020 | 24 Hours of Le Mans – LMGTE Am | AF Corse | 1 | 0 | 0 | 0 | 0 | —N/a | DNF |
| 2020 | GT World Challenge Europe Endurance Cup – Pro-Am | Garage 59 | 4 | 2 | 0 | 0 | 3 | 92 | **1st** |
| 2020 | 24 Hours of Nürburgring – SP8T | Garage 59 | 1 | 0 | 0 | 0 | 1 | —N/a | **3rd** |
| 2020 | Nürburgring Langstrecken-Serie – SP8T | Garage 59 | 2 | 0 | 0 | 0 | 1 | 9.11 | 10th |
| 2020 | British GT Championship – GT3 Pro-Am | Garage 59 | 1 | 0 | 0 | 0 | 0 | 0 | NC† |
| 2021 | Asian Le Mans Series – GT | Garage 59 | 4 | 0 | 0 | 0 | 1 | 35 | 5th |
| 2021 | GT World Challenge Europe Endurance Cup – Pro-Am | Garage 59 | 5 | 1 | 0 | 0 | 2 | 57 | 7th |
| 2021 | GT World Challenge Europe Sprint Cup – Pro-Am | Garage 59 | 10 | 1 | 0 | 0 | 7 | 101.5 | 4th |
| 2022 | Asian Le Mans Series – GT | Garage 59 | 4 | 0 | 0 | 0 | 1 | 29.5 | 7th |
| 2022 | GT World Challenge Europe Endurance Cup – Pro-Am | Garage 59 | 5 | 0 | 0 | 0 | 3 | 99 | **3rd** |
| 2022 | British GT Championship – GT3 Pro-Am | Garage 59 | 1 | 0 | 0 | 0 | 1 | 0 | NC† |
| 2022 | 24 Hours of Le Mans – LMGTE Am | Inception Racing | 1 | 0 | 0 | 0 | 0 | —N/a | DNF |
| 2023 | Asian Le Mans Series – GT | Garage 59 | 4 | 0 | 0 | 0 | 0 | 16 | 8th |
| 2023 | British GT Championship – GT3 Pro-Am | Garage 59 | 5 | 0 | 0 | 0 | 1 | 16 | 19th |
| 2023 | Gulf 12 Hours – GT3 Pro-Am | Garage 59 | 1 | 0 | 0 | 0 | 0 | —N/a | 5th |
| 2024 | British GT Championship – GT3 Silver-Am | Sky - Tempesta Racing | 0 | 0 | 0 | 0 | 0 | 0 | NC |
| 2024 | Gulf 12 Hours – GT3 Pro-Am | Garage 59 | 1 | 1 | 0 | 0 | 1 | —N/a | **1st** |
| 2025 | McLaren Trophy Europe – Am | Garage 59 | 2 | 2 | 0 | 0 | 2 | 30 | 5th |
| 2025 | International GT Open – Am | Garage 59 | 6 | 1 | 2 | 0 | 4 | 42 | 5th |
| 2025 | International GT Open – Pro-Am | Garage 59 | 1 | 0 | 0 | 0 | 1 | 16 | 14th |
| 2025 | Gulf 12 Hours – Am | Garage 59 | 1 | 1 | 0 | 0 | 1 | —N/a | **1st** |
| 2026 | FIA World Endurance Championship – LMGT3 | Garage 59 | 8 | 0 | 0 | 0 | 0 | 22 | 19th |

^{†} As West was a guest driver, he was ineligible to score points.

=== Complete International GT Open results ===
| Year | Team | Car | Class | 1 | 2 | 3 | 4 | 5 | 6 | 7 | 8 | 9 | 10 | 11 | 12 | 13 | 14 | Pos. | Points |
|---|---|---|---|---|---|---|---|---|---|---|---|---|---|---|---|---|---|---|---|
| 2016 | Garage 59 | McLaren 650S GT3 | Pro-Am | EST; 1; 4 | EST; 2; 10 | SPA; 1; 3 | SPA; 2; 9 | LEC; 1; 9 | LEC; 2; 5 | SIL; 1; 10 | SIL; 2; 8 | RBR; 1; 5 | RBR; 2; 3 | MNZ; 1; 3 | MNZ; 2; 1 | CAT; 1; 9 | CAT; 2 Ret | 6th | 38 |
| 2017 | Garage 59 | McLaren 650S GT3 | Pro-Am | EST; 1; 2 | EST; 2; 4 | SPA; 1 Ret | SPA; 2; 2 | LEC; 1; 7 | LEC; 2; 6 | HUN; 1; 6 | HUN; 2; 1 | SIL; 1; 7 | SIL; 2 Ret | MNZ; 1; 2 | MNZ; 2; 1 | CAT; 1; 2 | CAT; 2; 9 | 3rd | 60 |
| 2018 | Luzich Racing | Ferrari 488 GT3 | Pro-Am | EST; 1; 3 | EST; 2; 3 | LEC; 1; 2 | LEC; 2; 5 | SPA; 1 Ret | SPA; 2; 6 | HUN; 1; 9 | HUN; 2; 2 | SIL; 1; 10 | SIL; 2; 4 | MNZ; 1; 8 | MNZ; 2; 9 | CAT; 1; 8 | CAT; 2; 10 | 6th | 37 |
| 2025 | Garage 59 | McLaren 720S GT3 Evo | Am | PRT; 1 | PRT; 2 | SPA | HOC; 1; 1 | HOC; 2; 4 | HUN; 1; 2 | HUN; 2; 2 | LEC; 1; 4 | LEC; 2; 2 | RBR; 1 | RBR; 2 | CAT; 1 | CAT; 2 | | 5th | 42 |
| 2025 | Garage 59 | McLaren 720S GT3 Evo | Pro-Am | | | | | | | | | | | | | | MNZ; 2 | 14th | 16 |

=== Complete GT World Challenge Europe results ===
==== GT World Challenge Europe Endurance Cup ====
(Races in bold indicate pole position) (Races in italics indicate fastest lap)

| Year | Team | Car | Class | 1 | 2 | 3 | 4 | 5 | 6 | 7 | Pos. | Points |
|---|---|---|---|---|---|---|---|---|---|---|---|---|
| 2017 | Garage 59 | McLaren 650S GT3 | Am | MNZ | SIL; Ret | LEC | SPA; 6H; 52 | SPA; 12H; 41 | SPA; 24H; 32 | CAT | 20th | 12 |
| 2018 | Garage 59 | McLaren 650S GT3 | Am | MNZ; Ret | **SIL**; 25 | **LEC**; 18 | **SPA**; **6H**; 45 | **SPA**; **12H**; 39 | **SPA**; **24H**; 42 | CAT; 37 | 2nd | 92 |
| 2019 | Garage 59 | Aston Martin Vantage AMR GT3 | Am | MNZ; 30 | SIL; 33 | **LEC**; 24 | SPA; 6H; 40 | SPA; 12H; 41 | SPA; 24H; 47 | CAT; 22 | 2nd | 99 |
| 2020 | Garage 59 | Aston Martin Vantage AMR GT3 | Pro-Am | IMO; 13 | NÜR; 33 | SPA; 6H; 17 | SPA; 12H; 24 | SPA; 24H; 20 | LEC; 20 | | 1st | 92 |
| 2021 | Garage 59 | Aston Martin Vantage AMR GT3 | Pro-Am | MNZ; 14 | LEC; 25 | SPA; 6H; 23 | SPA; 12H; 47 | SPA; 24H; Ret | NÜR; 31 | CAT; Ret | 7th | 57 |
| 2022 | Garage 59 | McLaren 720S GT3 | Pro-Am | IMO; 34 | **LEC**; 25 | SPA; 6H; 29 | SPA; 12H; 24 | SPA; 24H; 41† | **HOC**; 35 | **CAT**; 40 | 3rd | 99 |

==== GT World Challenge Europe Sprint Cup ====
| Year | Team | Car | Class | 1 | 2 | 3 | 4 | 5 | 6 | 7 | 8 | 9 | 10 | Pos. | Points |
|---|---|---|---|---|---|---|---|---|---|---|---|---|---|---|---|
| 2021 | Garage 59 | Aston Martin Vantage AMR GT3 | Pro-Am | **MAG**; **1**; 22 | **MAG**; **2**; 21 | ZAN; 1; 23 | ZAN; 2; 21 | MIS; 1; 21 | **MIS**; **2**; 18 | BRH; 1; 23 | BRH; 2; 24 | VAL; 1 Ret | VAL; 2; 20 | 4th | 101.5 |

=== Complete Asian Le Mans Series results ===
(key) (Races in bold indicate pole position) (Races in italics indicate fastest lap)

| Year | Team | Class | Car | Engine | 1 | 2 | 3 | 4 | Pos. | Points |
|---|---|---|---|---|---|---|---|---|---|---|
| 2018–19 | Spirit of Race | LMP2 | Ligier JS P2 | Nissan VK45DE 4.5 L V8 | SHA; 1 | FUJ; 6 | CHA | SEP; 5 | 5th | 45 |
| 2021 | Garage 59 | GT | Aston Martin Vantage AMR GT3 | Aston Martin 4.0 L Turbo V8 | DUB; 1; 5 | DUB; 2; 3 | ABU; 1; 6 | ABU; 2; 9 | 5th | 35 |
| 2022 | Garage 59 | GT | McLaren 720S GT3 | McLaren M840T 4.0 L Turbo V8 | DUB; 1; 5 | DUB; 2; 8 | ABU; 1; 14 | ABU; 2; 3 | 7th | 29.5 |
| 2023 | Garage 59 | GT | McLaren 720S GT3 | McLaren M840T 4.0 L Turbo V8 | DUB; 1; 15 | DUB; 2; 4 | ABU; 1 Ret | ABU; 2; 8 | 8th | 16 |

=== Complete European Le Mans Series results ===
(key) (Races in bold indicate pole position; results in italics indicate fastest lap)

| Year | Entrant | Class | Chassis | Engine | 1 | 2 | 3 | 4 | 5 | Rank | Points |
|---|---|---|---|---|---|---|---|---|---|---|---|
| 2020 | AF Corse | LMGTE | Ferrari 488 GTE Evo | Ferrari F154CB 3.9 L Turbo V8 | LEC; 5 | SPA; 7 | LEC | MNZ | ALG; Ret | 13th | 20 |

=== Complete 24 Hours of Le Mans results ===
| Year | Team | Co-Drivers | Car | Class | Laps | Pos. | Class Pos. |
|---|---|---|---|---|---|---|---|
| 2020 | (Italy) AF Corse | (Germany) Steffen Görig (Switzerland) Christoph Ulrich | Ferrari 488 GTE Evo | LMGTE Am | 80 | DNF | DNF |
| 2022 | (United Kingdom) Inception Racing | (France) Côme Ledogar (France) Marvin Klein | Ferrari 488 GTE Evo | LMGTE Am | 190 | DNF | DNF |
| 2026 | (United Kingdom) Garage 59 | (Germany) Finn Gehrsitz (Germany) Benjamin Goethe | McLaren 720S GT3 Evo | LMGT3 | 329 | 47th | 15th |

=== Complete British GT Championship results ===
(key) (Races in bold indicate pole position) (Races in italics indicate fastest lap)

| Year | Team | Car | Class | 1 | 2 | 3 | 4 | 5 | 6 | 7 | 8 | 9 | DC | Points |
|---|---|---|---|---|---|---|---|---|---|---|---|---|---|---|
| 2020 | Garage 59 | Aston Martin Vantage AMR GT3 | GT3 Pro-Am | OUL; 1 | OUL; 2 | DON1; 1 | DON1; 2 | BRH | DON2 | SNE; 1 | SNE; 2 | SIL; Ret | NC† | 0† |
| 2022 | Garage 59 | McLaren 720S GT3 Evo | GT3 Pro-Am | OUL; 1 | OUL; 2 | SIL; 2 | DON1 | SNE; 1 | SNE; 2 | SPA | BRH | DON2 | NC† | 0† |
| 2023 | Garage 59 | McLaren 720S GT3 Evo | GT3 Pro-Am | OUL; 1; 11 | OUL; 2; 3 | SIL; 33 | DON1; Ret | SNE; 1; 16 | SNE; 2 WD | ALG | BRH | DON2 | 19th | 16 |
| 2024 | Sky - Tempesta Racing | Ferrari 296 GT3 | GT3 Silver-Am | OUL; 1 | OUL; 2 | SIL; WD | DON1 | SPA | SNE; 1 | SNE; 2 | DON2 | BRH | NC | 0 |

=== Complete FIA World Endurance Championship results ===
(key) (Races in bold indicate pole position; races in italics indicate fastest lap)

| Year | Entrant | Class | Chassis | Engine | 1 | 2 | 3 | 4 | 5 | 6 | 7 | 8 | Rank | Points |
|---|---|---|---|---|---|---|---|---|---|---|---|---|---|---|
| 2026 | Garage 59 | LMGT3 | McLaren 720S GT3 Evo | McLaren M840T 4.0 L Turbo V8 | IMO; 7 | SPA; 5 | LMS; 10 | SÃO; 11 | COA; 8 | FUJ; Ret | CAT; 11 | MNZ; Ret | 19th | 22 |
