= 2020 European Le Mans Series =

Motor racing series

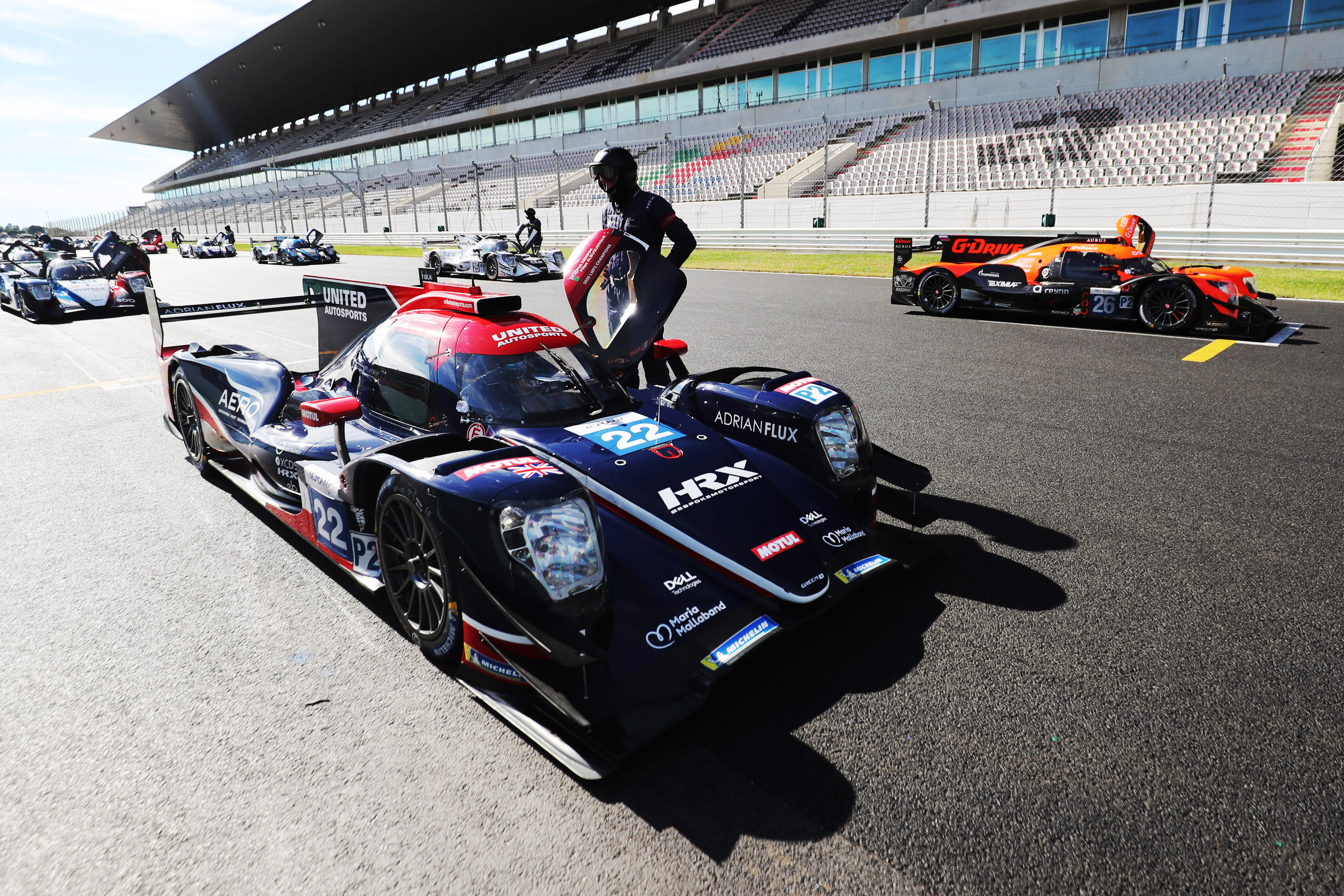
United Autosports No. 22 Oreca 07, winner of the 2020 European Le Mans Series in the LMP2 class

The 2020 European Le Mans Series was the seventeenth season of the Automobile Club de l'Ouest's (ACO) European Le Mans Series. The six-event season began at Circuit Paul Ricard on 19 July and finished at Algarve International Circuit on 1 November.

The series was open to Le Mans Prototypes, divided into the LMP2 and LMP3 classes, and grand tourer-style racing cars in the LMGTE class.

This season marked as the debut for the new ACO Generation II LMP3 cars.

== Calendar ==
The revised calendar for the 2020 season was announced on 3 April 2020. Due to the COVID-19 pandemic, the season was shortened and the 4 Hours of Silverstone was removed from the calendar as a date could not be found. Following an increase in COVID-19 cases in Spain, the Barcelona round was replaced by a second race at Paul Ricard.

Rnd	Race	Circuit	Location	Date
1	4 Hours of Le Castellet	(France) Circuit Paul Ricard	Le Castellet, France	19 July
2	4 Hours of Spa-Francorchamps	(Belgium) Circuit de Spa-Francorchamps	Spa, Belgium	9 August
3	Le Castellet 240	(France) Circuit Paul Ricard	Le Castellet, France	29 August
4	4 Hours of Monza	(Italy) Autodromo Nazionale di Monza	Monza, Italy	11 October
5	4 Hours of Portimão	(Portugal) Algarve International Circuit	Portimão, Portugal	1 November
Cancelled due to the 2019-20 coronavirus pandemic
	Race	Circuit	Location	Original Date
	4 Hours of Silverstone	(United Kingdom) Silverstone Circuit	Silverstone, Great Britain	5 September
	4 Hours of Barcelona	(Spain) Circuit de Barcelona-Catalunya	Montmeló, Spain	29 August

== Entries ==
=== LMP2 ===
In accordance with the 2017 LMP2 regulations, all cars in the LMP2 class used the Gibson GK428 V8 engine.

Entrant/Team	Chassis	Tyre	No.	Drivers	Rounds
(Denmark) High Class Racing	Oreca 07	M	20	(Denmark) Dennis Andersen	All
(Denmark) High Class Racing	Oreca 07	M	20	(Denmark) Anders Fjordbach	All
(United States) DragonSpeed USA	Oreca 07	M	21	(United Kingdom) Ben Hanley	1–3
(United States) DragonSpeed USA	Oreca 07	M	21	(Mexico) Memo Rojas	1–3
(United States) DragonSpeed USA	Oreca 07	M	21	(Republic of Ireland) Ryan Cullen	1–2
(United States) DragonSpeed USA	Oreca 07	M	21	(France) Timothé Buret	3
(United States) DragonSpeed USA	Oreca 07	M	27	(United Kingdom) Ben Hanley	4
(United States) DragonSpeed USA	Oreca 07	M	27	(Sweden) Henrik Hedman	4
(United States) DragonSpeed USA	Oreca 07	M	27	(France) Charles Milesi	4
(United Kingdom) United Autosports	Oreca 07	M	22	(Portugal) Filipe Albuquerque	All
(United Kingdom) United Autosports	Oreca 07	M	22	(United Kingdom) Phil Hanson	All
(United Kingdom) United Autosports	Oreca 07	M	32	(United Kingdom) Alex Brundle	All
(United Kingdom) United Autosports	Oreca 07	M	32	(United States) Will Owen	All
(United Kingdom) United Autosports	Oreca 07	M	32	(Netherlands) Job van Uitert	All
(Portugal) Algarve Pro Racing	Oreca 07	G	24	(Sweden) Henning Enqvist	All
(Portugal) Algarve Pro Racing	Oreca 07	G	24	(United Kingdom) Jon Lancaster	All
(Portugal) Algarve Pro Racing	Oreca 07	G	24	(France) Loïc Duval	1–3, 5
(Portugal) Algarve Pro Racing	Oreca 07	G	24	(India) Arjun Maini	4
(Portugal) Algarve Pro Racing	Oreca 07	G	25	(India) Arjun Maini	5
(Portugal) Algarve Pro Racing	Oreca 07	G	25	(France) Gabriel Aubry	All
(Portugal) Algarve Pro Racing	Oreca 07	G	25	(United States) John Falb	All
(Portugal) Algarve Pro Racing	Oreca 07	G	25	(Switzerland) Simon Trummer	1–4
(Russia) G-Drive Racing	Aurus 01	M	26	(Denmark) Mikkel Jensen	All
(Russia) G-Drive Racing	Aurus 01	M	26	(Russia) Roman Rusinov	All
(Russia) G-Drive Racing	Aurus 01	M	26	(Netherlands) Nyck de Vries	1, 4–5
(Russia) G-Drive Racing	Aurus 01	M	26	(France) Jean-Éric Vergne	3
(France) IDEC Sport	Oreca 07	M	28	(United Kingdom) Richard Bradley	All
(France) IDEC Sport	Oreca 07	M	28	(France) Paul Lafargue	All
(France) IDEC Sport	Oreca 07	M	28	(France) Paul-Loup Chatin	1–3, 5
(France) IDEC Sport	Oreca 07	M	28	(France) Nicolas Minassian	4
(France) Duqueine Team	Oreca 07	M	30	(France) Tristan Gommendy	All
(France) Duqueine Team	Oreca 07	M	30	(Switzerland) Jonathan Hirschi	All
(France) Duqueine Team	Oreca 07	M	30	(Russia) Konstantin Tereshchenko	All
(France) Panis Racing	Oreca 07	G	31	(France) Julien Canal	All
(France) Panis Racing	Oreca 07	G	31	(France) Nico Jamin	All
(France) Panis Racing	Oreca 07	G	31	(United Kingdom) Will Stevens	All
(Poland) Inter Europol Competition	Ligier JS P217	M	34	(Austria) René Binder	All
(Poland) Inter Europol Competition	Ligier JS P217	M	34	(Russia) Matevos Isaakyan	1–4
(Poland) Inter Europol Competition	Ligier JS P217	M	34	(Poland) Jakub Śmiechowski	All
(United Kingdom) BHK Motorsport	Oreca 07	G	35	(Italy) Sergio Campana	All
(United Kingdom) BHK Motorsport	Oreca 07	G	35	(Italy) Francesco Dracone	All
(Switzerland) Cool Racing	Oreca 07	M	37	(Switzerland) Antonin Borga	All
(Switzerland) Cool Racing	Oreca 07	M	37	(Switzerland) Alexandre Coigny	All
(Switzerland) Cool Racing	Oreca 07	M	37	(France) Nicolas Lapierre	All
(United Kingdom) Jota Sport	Oreca 07	G	38	(United Kingdom) Anthony Davidson	2
(United Kingdom) Jota Sport	Oreca 07	G	38	(United Kingdom) Jake Dennis	2
(United Kingdom) Jota Sport	Oreca 07	G	38	(Mexico) Roberto González	2
(France) Graff	Oreca 07	M	39	(Australia) James Allen	All
(France) Graff	Oreca 07	M	39	(France) Alexandre Cougnaud	All
(France) Graff	Oreca 07	M	39	(France) Thomas Laurent	All
(Switzerland) Richard Mille Racing Team	Alpine A470	M	50	(Colombia) Tatiana Calderón	1–2, 4–5
(Switzerland) Richard Mille Racing Team	Alpine A470	M	50	(Brazil) André Negrão	1–2
(Switzerland) Richard Mille Racing Team	Alpine A470	M	50	(Netherlands) Beitske Visser	2–5
(Switzerland) Richard Mille Racing Team	Alpine A470	M	50	(Germany) Sophia Flörsch	3–5

- Mathias Beche was scheduled to compete for Inter Europol Competition, but did not appear at any rounds.
- Katherine Legge was scheduled to compete for the Richard Mille Racing Team, but was forced to withdraw after injuring her leg and wrist in a pre-season testing crash. She was replaced by André Negrão at short notice and Beitske Visser from round two.

=== LMP3 ===
All cars in the LMP3 class used the Nissan VK56DE 5.6L V8 engine and Michelin tyres.

Entrant/Team	Chassis	No.	Drivers	Rounds
(United Kingdom) United Autosports	Ligier JS P320	2	(United Kingdom) Wayne Boyd	All
(United Kingdom) United Autosports	Ligier JS P320	2	(United Kingdom) Tom Gamble	All
(United Kingdom) United Autosports	Ligier JS P320	2	(United Kingdom) Robert Wheldon	All
(United Kingdom) United Autosports	Ligier JS P320	3	(United Kingdom) Andrew Bentley	All
(United Kingdom) United Autosports	Ligier JS P320	3	(United Kingdom) Duncan Tappy	All
(United Kingdom) United Autosports	Ligier JS P320	3	(United States) Jim McGuire	1–2, 4–5
(Luxembourg) DKR Engineering	Duqueine M30 – D08	4	(Germany) Laurents Hörr	All
(Luxembourg) DKR Engineering	Duqueine M30 – D08	4	(France) François Kirmann	All
(Luxembourg) DKR Engineering	Duqueine M30 – D08	4	(Germany) Wolfgang Triller	1, 3–5
(Luxembourg) DKR Engineering	Duqueine M30 – D08	4	(Belgium) Jean Glorieux	2
(France) Graff	Duqueine M30 – D08	5	(Switzerland) Sébastien Page	All
(France) Graff	Duqueine M30 – D08	5	(Switzerland) Luis Sanjuan	1–4
(France) Graff	Duqueine M30 – D08	5	(France) Eric Trouillet	All
(France) Graff	Ligier JS P320	9	(France) Vincent Capillaire	All
(France) Graff	Ligier JS P320	9	(France) Arnold Robin	All
(France) Graff	Ligier JS P320	9	(France) Maxime Robin	All
(United Kingdom) Nielsen Racing	Duqueine M30 – D08	7	(United Kingdom) Colin Noble	All
(United Kingdom) Nielsen Racing	Duqueine M30 – D08	7	(United Kingdom) Anthony Wells	All
(United Kingdom) Nielsen Racing	Duqueine M30 – D08	10	(United States) Charles Crews	All
(United Kingdom) Nielsen Racing	Duqueine M30 – D08	10	(Canada) Garett Grist	All
(United Kingdom) Nielsen Racing	Duqueine M30 – D08	10	(United States) Rob Hodes	All
(Switzerland) Realteam Racing	Ligier JS P320	8	(Switzerland) Esteban García	1–4
(Switzerland) Realteam Racing	Ligier JS P320	8	(Switzerland) David Droux	All
(Switzerland) Realteam Racing	Ligier JS P320	8	(Algeria) Julien Gerbi	5
(United States) Eurointernational	Ligier JS P320	11	(Finland) Niko Kari	All
(United States) Eurointernational	Ligier JS P320	11	(Brazil) Thomas Erdos	1–2
(United States) Eurointernational	Ligier JS P320	11	(Greece) Andreas Laskaratos	2
(United States) Eurointernational	Ligier JS P320	11	(Italy) Jacopo Baratto	3–5
(United States) Eurointernational	Ligier JS P320	11	(Switzerland) Nicolas Maulini	3–5
(Poland) Inter Europol Competition	Ligier JS P320	13	(Germany) Martin Hippe	All
(Poland) Inter Europol Competition	Ligier JS P320	13	(United Kingdom) Nigel Moore	1–3
(Poland) Inter Europol Competition	Ligier JS P320	13	(France) Dino Lunardi	4–5
(United Kingdom) RLR MSport	Ligier JS P320	15	(Canada) James Dayson	All
(United Kingdom) RLR MSport	Ligier JS P320	15	(Denmark) Malthe Jakobsen	All
(United Kingdom) RLR MSport	Ligier JS P320	15	(United Kingdom) Ryan Harper-Ellam	1
(United Kingdom) RLR MSport	Ligier JS P320	15	(United States) Robert Megennis	2–3
(United Kingdom) RLR MSport	Ligier JS P320	15	(Lithuania) Gustas Grinbergas	4
(United Kingdom) RLR MSport	Ligier JS P320	15	(Italy) Lorenzo Veglia	5
(United Kingdom) BHK Motorsport	Ligier JS P320	16	(Italy) Lorenzo Veglia	1–4
(United Kingdom) BHK Motorsport	Ligier JS P320	16	(Italy) Andrea Fontana	1–2
(United Kingdom) BHK Motorsport	Ligier JS P320	16	(Italy) Jacopo Baratto	1–2
(United Kingdom) BHK Motorsport	Ligier JS P320	16	(Lithuania) Gustas Grinbergas	3
(United Kingdom) BHK Motorsport	Ligier JS P320	16	(United Kingdom) Nick Adock	3
(United Kingdom) BHK Motorsport	Ligier JS P320	16	(Belgium) Tom Cloet	4–5
(United Kingdom) BHK Motorsport	Ligier JS P320	16	(France) Philippe Paillot	4
(United Kingdom) BHK Motorsport	Ligier JS P320	16	(Lithuania) Julius Adomavičius	5
(United Kingdom) BHK Motorsport	Ligier JS P320	16	(Switzerland) Alex Fontana	5

=== LMGTE ===
All cars in the LMGTE class used Goodyear tyres.

Entrant/Team	Chassis	Engine	No.	Drivers	Rounds
(Italy) AF Corse	Ferrari 488 GTE Evo	Ferrari F154CB 4.0 L Turbo V8	51	(Germany) Steffen Görig	1–3, 5
(Italy) AF Corse	Ferrari 488 GTE Evo	Ferrari F154CB 4.0 L Turbo V8	51	(Switzerland) Christoph Ulrich	1–3, 5
(Italy) AF Corse	Ferrari 488 GTE Evo	Ferrari F154CB 4.0 L Turbo V8	51	(Sweden) Alexander West	1–2, 5
(Italy) AF Corse	Ferrari 488 GTE Evo	Ferrari F154CB 4.0 L Turbo V8	51	(Brazil) Daniel Serra	3
(Italy) AF Corse	Ferrari 488 GTE Evo	Ferrari F154CB 4.0 L Turbo V8	54	(Italy) Francesco Castellacci	2
(Italy) AF Corse	Ferrari 488 GTE Evo	Ferrari F154CB 4.0 L Turbo V8	54	(Switzerland) Thomas Flohr	2
(Italy) AF Corse	Ferrari 488 GTE Evo	Ferrari F154CB 4.0 L Turbo V8	88	(France) Emmanuel Collard	2, 5
(Italy) AF Corse	Ferrari 488 GTE Evo	Ferrari F154CB 4.0 L Turbo V8	88	(France) François Perrodo	2, 5
(Italy) AF Corse	Ferrari 488 GTE Evo	Ferrari F154CB 4.0 L Turbo V8	88	(United Kingdom) Harrison Newey	2
(Italy) AF Corse	Ferrari 488 GTE Evo	Ferrari F154CB 4.0 L Turbo V8	88	(Italy) Alessio Rovera	5
(Switzerland) Spirit of Race	Ferrari 488 GTE Evo	Ferrari F154CB 4.0 L Turbo V8	55	(United Kingdom) Duncan Cameron	All
(Switzerland) Spirit of Race	Ferrari 488 GTE Evo	Ferrari F154CB 4.0 L Turbo V8	55	(Republic of Ireland) Matt Griffin	All
(Switzerland) Spirit of Race	Ferrari 488 GTE Evo	Ferrari F154CB 4.0 L Turbo V8	55	(United Kingdom) Aaron Scott	All
(Italy) Iron Lynx	Ferrari 488 GTE Evo	Ferrari F154CB 4.0 L Turbo V8	60	(Italy) Sergio Pianezzola	1–2, 4–5
(Italy) Iron Lynx	Ferrari 488 GTE Evo	Ferrari F154CB 4.0 L Turbo V8	60	(Italy) Claudio Schiavoni	1–4
(Italy) Iron Lynx	Ferrari 488 GTE Evo	Ferrari F154CB 4.0 L Turbo V8	60	(Italy) Andrea Piccini	1–2, 4–5
(Italy) Iron Lynx	Ferrari 488 GTE Evo	Ferrari F154CB 4.0 L Turbo V8	60	(Denmark) Nicklas Nielsen	3
(Italy) Iron Lynx	Ferrari 488 GTE Evo	Ferrari F154CB 4.0 L Turbo V8	60	(Italy) Rino Mastronardi	3, 5
(Italy) Iron Lynx	Ferrari 488 GTE Evo	Ferrari F154CB 4.0 L Turbo V8	83	(Switzerland) Rahel Frey	All
(Italy) Iron Lynx	Ferrari 488 GTE Evo	Ferrari F154CB 4.0 L Turbo V8	83	(Denmark) Michelle Gatting	All
(Italy) Iron Lynx	Ferrari 488 GTE Evo	Ferrari F154CB 4.0 L Turbo V8	83	(Italy) Manuela Gostner	All
(United Kingdom) Red River Sport	Ferrari 488 GTE Evo	Ferrari F154CB 4.0 L Turbo V8	62	(United Kingdom) Bonamy Grimes	2
(United Kingdom) Red River Sport	Ferrari 488 GTE Evo	Ferrari F154CB 4.0 L Turbo V8	62	(United Kingdom) Charles Hollings	2
(United Kingdom) Red River Sport	Ferrari 488 GTE Evo	Ferrari F154CB 4.0 L Turbo V8	62	(United Kingdom) Johnny Mowlem	2
(United Kingdom) JMW Motorsport	Ferrari 488 GTE Evo	Ferrari F154CB 4.0 L Turbo V8	66	(United Kingdom) Finlay Hutchison	All
(United Kingdom) JMW Motorsport	Ferrari 488 GTE Evo	Ferrari F154CB 4.0 L Turbo V8	66	(United Kingdom) Hunter Abbott	1
(United Kingdom) JMW Motorsport	Ferrari 488 GTE Evo	Ferrari F154CB 4.0 L Turbo V8	66	(United Kingdom) Jody Fannin	1
(United Kingdom) JMW Motorsport	Ferrari 488 GTE Evo	Ferrari F154CB 4.0 L Turbo V8	66	(United States) Gunnar Jeannette	2–5
(United Kingdom) JMW Motorsport	Ferrari 488 GTE Evo	Ferrari F154CB 4.0 L Turbo V8	66	(United States) Rodrigo Sales	2–5
(Switzerland) Kessel Racing	Ferrari 488 GTE Evo	Ferrari F154CB 4.0 L Turbo V8	74	(Poland) Michał Broniszewski	All
(Switzerland) Kessel Racing	Ferrari 488 GTE Evo	Ferrari F154CB 4.0 L Turbo V8	74	(South Africa) David Perel	All
(Switzerland) Kessel Racing	Ferrari 488 GTE Evo	Ferrari F154CB 4.0 L Turbo V8	74	(Italy) Nicola Cadei	1, 4–5
(Switzerland) Kessel Racing	Ferrari 488 GTE Evo	Ferrari F154CB 4.0 L Turbo V8	74	(Brazil) Marcos Gomes	2–3
(Germany) Proton Competition	Porsche 911 RSR	Porsche M97/80 4.0 L Flat-6	77	(Italy) Michele Beretta	All
(Germany) Proton Competition	Porsche 911 RSR	Porsche M97/80 4.0 L Flat-6	77	(Belgium) Alessio Picariello	All
(Germany) Proton Competition	Porsche 911 RSR	Porsche M97/80 4.0 L Flat-6	77	(Germany) Christian Ried	All
(Germany) Proton Competition	Porsche 911 RSR	Porsche M97/80 4.0 L Flat-6	93	(Republic of Ireland) Michael Fassbender	All
(Germany) Proton Competition	Porsche 911 RSR	Porsche M97/80 4.0 L Flat-6	93	(Germany) Felipe Fernández Laser	All
(Germany) Proton Competition	Porsche 911 RSR	Porsche M97/80 4.0 L Flat-6	93	(Austria) Richard Lietz	All
(United Kingdom) Gulf Racing UK	Porsche 911 RSR	Porsche M97/80 4.0 L Flat-6	86	(United Kingdom) Ben Barker	5
(United Kingdom) Gulf Racing UK	Porsche 911 RSR	Porsche M97/80 4.0 L Flat-6	86	(United Kingdom) Michael Wainwright	5
(United Kingdom) Gulf Racing UK	Porsche 911 RSR	Porsche M97/80 4.0 L Flat-6	86	(United Kingdom) Andrew Watson	5
(United Kingdom) Aston Martin Racing	Aston Martin Vantage AMR	Aston Martin M177 4.0 L Turbo V8	98	(Canada) Paul Dalla Lana	1–2
(United Kingdom) Aston Martin Racing	Aston Martin Vantage AMR	Aston Martin M177 4.0 L Turbo V8	98	(Austria) Mathias Lauda	1–2
(United Kingdom) Aston Martin Racing	Aston Martin Vantage AMR	Aston Martin M177 4.0 L Turbo V8	98	(United Kingdom) Ross Gunn	1
(United Kingdom) Aston Martin Racing	Aston Martin Vantage AMR	Aston Martin M177 4.0 L Turbo V8	98	(Brazil) Augusto Farfus	2

== Results ==
Bold indicates overall winner.

Rnd.	Circuit	LMP2 Winning Team	LMP3 Winning Team	LMGTE Winning Team	Results
Rnd.	Circuit	LMP2 Winning Drivers	LMP3 Winning Drivers	LMGTE Winning Drivers	Results
1	(France) Le Castellet	**(United Kingdom) No. 32 United Autosports**	(United Kingdom) No. 2 United Autosports	(Germany) No. 77 Proton Competition	Report
1	(France) Le Castellet	**(United Kingdom) Alex Brundle** **(United States) Will Owen** **(Netherlands) Job van Uitert**	(United Kingdom) Wayne Boyd (United Kingdom) Tom Gamble (United Kingdom) Robert Wheldon	(Italy) Michele Beretta (Belgium) Alessio Picariello (Germany) Christian Ried	Report
2	(Belgium) Spa-Francorchamps	**(United Kingdom) No. 22 United Autosports**	(United Kingdom) No. 2 United Autosports	(Switzerland) No. 74 Kessel Racing	Report
2	(Belgium) Spa-Francorchamps	**(Portugal) Filipe Albuquerque** **(United Kingdom) Phil Hanson**	(United Kingdom) Wayne Boyd (United Kingdom) Tom Gamble (United Kingdom) Robert Wheldon	(Poland) Michał Broniszewski (Brazil) Marcos Gomes (South Africa) David Perel	Report
3	(France) Le Castellet	**(United Kingdom) No. 22 United Autosports**	(Switzerland) No. 8 Realteam Racing	(Switzerland) No. 55 Spirit of Race	Report
3	(France) Le Castellet	**(Portugal) Filipe Albuquerque** **(United Kingdom) Phil Hanson**	(Switzerland) Esteban García (Switzerland) David Droux	(United Kingdom) Duncan Cameron (Republic of Ireland) Matt Griffin (United Kingdom) Aaron Scott	Report
4	(Italy) Monza	**(United Kingdom) No. 22 United Autosports**	(Poland) No. 13 Inter Europol Competition	(Switzerland) No. 74 Kessel Racing	Report
4	(Italy) Monza	**(Portugal) Filipe Albuquerque** **(United Kingdom) Phil Hanson**	(Germany) Martin Hippe (France) Dino Lunardi	(Poland) Michał Broniszewski (Italy) Nicola Cadei (South Africa) David Perel	Report
5	(Portugal) Portimão	**(Russia) No. 26 G-Drive Racing**	(United Kingdom) No. 2 United Autosports	(Germany) No. 77 Proton Competition	Report
5	(Portugal) Portimão	**(Denmark) Mikkel Jensen** **(Russia) Roman Rusinov** **(Netherlands) Nyck de Vries**	(United Kingdom) Wayne Boyd (United Kingdom) Tom Gamble (United Kingdom) Robert Wheldon	(Italy) Michele Beretta (Belgium) Alessio Picariello (Germany) Christian Ried	Report

== Teams Championships ==
Points are awarded according to the following structure:

Position	**1st**	**2nd**	**3rd**	**4th**	**5th**	**6th**	**7th**	**8th**	**9th**	**10th**	**Other**	**Pole**
Points	25	18	15	12	10	8	6	4	2	1	0.5	1

=== LMP2 Teams Championship ===
Pos.	Team	Car	RIC (France)	SPA (Belgium)	LEC (France)	MNZ (Italy)	POR (Portugal)	Points
1	(United Kingdom) #22 United Autosports	Oreca 07	**3**	**1**	**1**	**1**	3	109
2	(United Kingdom) #32 United Autosports	Oreca 07	1	5	8	2	**4**	70
3	(Russia) #26 G-Drive Racing	Aurus 01	2	Ret	2	Ret	1	61
4	(France) #31 Panis Racing	Oreca 07	Ret	3	4	5	5	47
5	(France) #39 Graff	Oreca 07	9	2	3	9	7	43
6	(France) #30 Duqueine Team	Oreca 07	Ret	4	9	7	2	38
7	(Switzerland) #37 Cool Racing	Oreca 07	4	10	12	4	9	28.5
8	(Denmark) #20 High Class Racing	Oreca 07	Ret	13	13	3	6	24
9	(France) #28 IDEC Sport	Oreca 07	Ret	7	7	6	10	21
10	(Switzerland) #50 Richard Mille Racing Team	Alpine A470	5	6	11	10	11	20
11	(Portugal) #25 Algarve Pro Racing	Oreca 07	10	9	5	11	8	19.5
12	(Poland) #34 Inter Europol Competition	Ligier JS P217	7	11	6	12	Ret	15.5
13	(Portugal) #24 Algarve Pro Racing	Oreca 07	6	12	Ret	8	12	13
14	(United States) #21 DragonSpeed	Oreca 07	8	14	10			5.5
15	(United Kingdom) #35 BHK Motorsport	Oreca 07	Ret	Ret	14	13	13	1.5
	(United States) #27 DragonSpeed	Oreca 07				DSQ		0
Entries ineligible to score points
–	(United Kingdom) #38 Jota Sport	Oreca 07		8				-
Pos.	Team	Car	RIC (France)	SPA (Belgium)	LEC (France)	MNZ (Italy)	POR (Portugal)	Points

Key
Colour	Result
Gold	Race winner
Silver	2nd place
Bronze	3rd place
Green	Points finish
Blue	Non-points finish
Blue	Non-classified finish (NC)
Purple	Did not finish (Ret)
Black	Disqualified (DSQ)
Black	Excluded (EX)
White	Did not start (DNS)
White	Race cancelled (C)
White	Withdrew (WD)
Blank	Did not participate

**Bold** – Pole
Italics – Fastest Lap

=== LMP3 Teams Championship ===
Pos.	Team	Car	RIC (France)	SPA (Belgium)	LEC (France)	MNZ (Italy)	POR (Portugal)	Points
1	(United Kingdom) #2 United Autosports	Ligier JS P320	**1**	**1**	Ret	**3**	**1**	94
2	(Poland) #13 Inter Europol Competition	Ligier JS P320	2	Ret	3	1	3	73
3	(Switzerland) #8 Realteam Racing	Ligier JS P320	4	Ret	**1**	4	2	68
4	(United States) #11 Eurointernational	Ligier JS P320	6	3	7	2	6	55
5	(United Kingdom) #3 United Autosports	Ligier JS P320	7	5	2	11	4	46.5
6	(France) #9 Graff	Ligier JS P320	5	4	8	5	7	42
7	(United Kingdom) #15 RLR MSport	Ligier JS P320	3	7	4	9	Ret	35
8	(United Kingdom) #10 Nielsen Racing	Duqueine M30 – D08	8	Ret	5	6	5	32
9	(Luxembourg) #4 DKR Engineering	Duqueine M30 – D08	10	6	6	7	10	24
10	(United Kingdom) #7 Nielsen Racing	Duqueine M30 – D08	Ret	2	Ret	8	11	22.5
11	(United Kingdom) #16 BHK Motorsport	Ligier JS P320	9	9	10	10	8	10
12	(France) #5 Graff	Duqueine M30 – D08	11	8	9	12	9	9
Pos.	Team	Car	RIC (France)	SPA (Belgium)	LEC (France)	MNZ (Italy)	POR (Portugal)	Points

Key
Colour	Result
Gold	Race winner
Silver	2nd place
Bronze	3rd place
Green	Points finish
Blue	Non-points finish
Blue	Non-classified finish (NC)
Purple	Did not finish (Ret)
Black	Disqualified (DSQ)
Black	Excluded (EX)
White	Did not start (DNS)
White	Race cancelled (C)
White	Withdrew (WD)
Blank	Did not participate

**Bold** – Pole
Italics – Fastest Lap

=== LMGTE Teams Championship ===
Pos.	Team	Car	RIC (France)	SPA (Belgium)	LEC (France)	MNZ (Italy)	POR (Portugal)	Points
1	(Germany) #77 Proton Competition	Porsche 911 RSR	1	6	**2**	2	1	99
2	(Switzerland) #74 Kessel Racing	Ferrari 488 GTE Evo	**2**	1	4	1	2	99
3	(Switzerland) #55 Spirit of Race	Ferrari 488 GTE Evo	Ret	5	1	4	5	62
4	(Italy) #83 Iron Lynx	Ferrari 488 GTE Evo	3	8	3	3	6	61
5	(Germany) #93 Proton Competition	Porsche 911 RSR	7	**4**	DNS	5	4	47
6	(United Kingdom) #66 JMW Motorsport	Ferrari 488 GTE Evo	4	9	7	6	7	38
7	(Italy) #60 Iron Lynx	Ferrari 488 GTE Evo	6	Ret	5	**Ret**	**3**	35
8	(Italy) #51 AF Corse	Ferrari 488 GTE Evo	5	7	6		Ret	28
Entries ineligible to score points
–	(Italy) #88 AF Corse	Ferrari 488 GTE Evo		2			8	–
–	(United Kingdom) #98 Aston Martin Racing	Aston Martin Vantage AMR	Ret	3				–
–	(Italy) #54 AF Corse	Ferrari 488 GTE Evo		Ret				–
–	(United Kingdom) #86 Gulf Racing UK	Porsche 911 RSR					Ret	–
–	(United Kingdom) #62 Red River Sport	Ferrari 488 GTE Evo		DNS				–
Pos.	Team	Car	RIC (France)	SPA (Belgium)	LEC (France)	MNZ (Italy)	POR (Portugal)	Points

Key
Colour	Result
Gold	Race winner
Silver	2nd place
Bronze	3rd place
Green	Points finish
Blue	Non-points finish
Blue	Non-classified finish (NC)
Purple	Did not finish (Ret)
Black	Disqualified (DSQ)
Black	Excluded (EX)
White	Did not start (DNS)
White	Race cancelled (C)
White	Withdrew (WD)
Blank	Did not participate

**Bold** – Pole
Italics – Fastest Lap

Notes

The two teams from cars #77 and #74 were tied on 99 points at the end of the championship and they both had two wins, two second places, one fourth and two pole positions from the five races. The crew of the #77 Proton Competition Porsche – Christian Ried, Michele Beretta and Alessio Picariello - were declared champions due to the fact they had won the first race of the season at Paul Ricard.

== Drivers Championships ==
Points are awarded according to the following structure:

Position	**1st**	**2nd**	**3rd**	**4th**	**5th**	**6th**	**7th**	**8th**	**9th**	**10th**	**Other**	**Pole**
Points	25	18	15	12	10	8	6	4	2	1	0.5	1

=== LMP2 Drivers Championship ===
Pos.	Driver	Team	RIC (France)	SPA (Belgium)	LEC (France)	MNZ (Italy)	POR (Portugal)	Points
1	(Portugal) Filipe Albuquerque	(United Kingdom) United Autosports	**3**	**1**	**1**	**1**	3	109
1	(United Kingdom) Phil Hanson	(United Kingdom) United Autosports	**3**	**1**	**1**	**1**	3	109
2	(United Kingdom) Alex Brundle	(United Kingdom) United Autosports	1	5	8	2	**4**	70
2	(United States) Will Owen	(United Kingdom) United Autosports	1	5	8	2	**4**	70
2	(Netherlands) Job van Uitert	(United Kingdom) United Autosports	1	5	8	2	**4**	70
3	(Denmark) Mikkel Jensen	(Russia) G-Drive Racing	2	Ret	2	Ret	1	61
3	(Russia) Roman Rusinov	(Russia) G-Drive Racing	2	Ret	2	Ret	1	61
4	(France) Julien Canal	(France) Panis Racing	Ret	3	4	5	5	47
4	(France) Nico Jamin	(France) Panis Racing	Ret	3	4	5	5	47
4	(United Kingdom) Will Stevens	(France) Panis Racing	Ret	3	4	5	5	47
5	(Netherlands) Nyck de Vries	(Russia) G-Drive Racing	2			Ret	1	43
6	(Australia) James Allen	(France) Graff	9	2	3	9	7	43
6	(France) Alexandre Cougnaud	(France) Graff	9	2	3	9	7	43
6	(France) Thomas Laurent	(France) Graff	9	2	3	9	7	43
7	(France) Tristan Gommendy	(France) Duqueine Team	Ret	4	9	7	2	38
7	(Switzerland) Jonathan Hirschi	(France) Duqueine Team	Ret	4	9	7	2	38
7	(Russia) Konstantin Tereshchenko	(France) Duqueine Team	Ret	4	9	7	2	38
8	(Switzerland) Antonin Borga	(Switzerland) Cool Racing	4	10	12	4	9	28.5
8	(Switzerland) Alexandre Coigny	(Switzerland) Cool Racing	4	10	12	4	9	28.5
8	(France) Nicolas Lapierre	(Switzerland) Cool Racing	4	10	12	4	9	28.5
9	(Denmark) Dennis Andersen	(Denmark) High Class Racing	Ret	13	13	3	6	24
9	(Denmark) Anders Fjordbach	(Denmark) High Class Racing	Ret	13	13	3	6	24
10	(United Kingdom) Richard Bradley	(France) IDEC Sport	Ret	7	7	6	10	21
10	(France) Paul Lafargue	(France) IDEC Sport	Ret	7	7	6	10	21
11	(Colombia) Tatiana Calderón	(Switzerland) Richard Mille Racing Team	5	6		10	11	19.5
12	(France) Gabriel Aubry	(Portugal) Algarve Pro Racing	10	9	5	11	8	19.5
12	(United States) John Falb	(Portugal) Algarve Pro Racing	10	9	5	11	8	19.5
13	(France) Jean-Éric Vergne	(Russia) G-Drive Racing			2			18
14	(Brazil) André Negrão	(Switzerland) Richard Mille Racing Team	5	6				18
15	(Switzerland) Simon Trummer	(Portugal) Algarve Pro Racing	10	9	5	11		15.5
16	(Austria) René Binder	(Poland) Inter Europol Competition	7	11	6	12	Ret	15.5
16	(Russia) Matevos Isaakyan	(Poland) Inter Europol Competition	7	11	6	12		15.5
16	(Poland) Jakub Śmiechowski	(Poland) Inter Europol Competition	7	11	6	12	Ret	15.5
17	(Sweden) Henning Enqvist	(Portugal) Algarve Pro Racing	6	12	Ret	8	12	13
17	(United Kingdom) Jon Lancaster	(Portugal) Algarve Pro Racing	6	12	Ret	8	12	13
18	(France) Paul-Loup Chatin	(France) IDEC Sport	Ret	7	7		10	13
19	(Netherlands) Beitske Visser	(Switzerland) Richard Mille Racing Team		6	11	10	11	10
20	(France) Loïc Duval	(Portugal) Algarve Pro Racing	6	12	Ret		12	9
21	(France) Nicolas Minassian	(France) IDEC Sport				6		8
22	(India) Arjun Maini	(Portugal) Algarve Pro Racing				8	8	8
23	(Mexico) Memo Rojas	(United States) DragonSpeed	8	14	10			5.5
24	(Republic of Ireland) Ryan Cullen	(United States) DragonSpeed	8	14				4.5
25	(Germany) Sophia Flörsch	(Switzerland) Richard Mille Racing Team			11	10	11	2
26	(Italy) Sergio Campana	(United Kingdom) BHK Motorsport	Ret	Ret	14	13	13	1.5
26	(Italy) Francesco Dracone	(United Kingdom) BHK Motorsport	Ret	Ret	14	13	13	1.5
27	(France) Timothé Buret	(United States) DragonSpeed			10			1
–	(United Kingdom) Ben Hanley	(United States) DragonSpeed	8	14	10	DSQ		–
–	(Sweden) Henrik Hedman	(United States) DragonSpeed				DSQ		–
–	(France) Charles Milesi	(United States) DragonSpeed				DSQ		–
Entries ineligible to score points
–	(United Kingdom) Anthony Davidson	(United Kingdom) Jota Sport		8				–
–	(United Kingdom) Jake Dennis	(United Kingdom) Jota Sport		8				–
–	(Mexico) Roberto González	(United Kingdom) Jota Sport		8				–
Pos.	Driver	Team	RIC (France)	SPA (Belgium)	LEC (France)	MNZ (Italy)	POR (Portugal)	Points

Key
Colour	Result
Gold	Race winner
Silver	2nd place
Bronze	3rd place
Green	Points finish
Blue	Non-points finish
Blue	Non-classified finish (NC)
Purple	Did not finish (Ret)
Black	Disqualified (DSQ)
Black	Excluded (EX)
White	Did not start (DNS)
White	Race cancelled (C)
White	Withdrew (WD)
Blank	Did not participate

**Bold** – Pole
Italics – Fastest Lap

=== LMP3 Drivers Championship ===
Pos.	Driver	Team	RIC (France)	SPA (Belgium)	LEC (France)	MNZ (Italy)	POR (Portugal)	Points
1	(United Kingdom) Wayne Boyd	(United Kingdom) United Autosports	**1**	**1**	Ret	**3**	**1**	94
1	(United Kingdom) Tom Gamble	(United Kingdom) United Autosports	**1**	**1**	Ret	**3**	**1**	94
1	(United Kingdom) Robert Wheldon	(United Kingdom) United Autosports	**1**	**1**	Ret	**3**	**1**	94
2	(Germany) Martin Hippe	(Poland) Inter Europol Competition	2	Ret	3	1	3	73
3	(Switzerland) David Droux	(Switzerland) Realteam Racing	4	Ret	**1**	4	2	68
4	(Finland) Niko Kari	(United States) EuroInternational	6	3	7	2	6	55
5	(Switzerland) Esteban García	(Switzerland) Realteam Racing	4	Ret	**1**	4		50
6	(United Kingdom) Andrew Bentley	(United Kingdom) United Autosports	7	5	2	11	4	46.5
6	(United Kingdom) Duncan Tappy	(United Kingdom) United Autosports	7	5	2	11	4	46.5
7	(France) Vincent Capillaire	(France) Graff	5	4	8	5	7	42
7	(France) Arnold Robin	(France) Graff	5	4	8	5	7	42
7	(France) Maxime Robin	(France) Graff	5	4	8	5	7	42
8	(France) Dino Lunardi	(Poland) Inter Europol Competition				1	3	40
9	(Italy) Jacopo Baratto	(United Kingdom) BHK Motorsport (1–2) (United States) EuroInternational (3–5)	9	9	7	2	6	36
10	(Canada) James Dayson	(United Kingdom) RLR MSport	3	7	4	9	Ret	35
10	(Denmark) Malthe Jakobsen	(United Kingdom) RLR MSport	3	7	4	9	Ret	35
11	(United Kingdom) Nigel Moore	(Poland) Inter Europol Competition	2	Ret	3			33
12	(Switzerland) Nicolas Maulini	(United States) EuroInternational			7	2	6	32
13	(United States) Charles Crews	(United Kingdom) Nielsen Racing	8	Ret	5	6	5	32
13	(Canada) Garett Grist	(United Kingdom) Nielsen Racing	8	Ret	5	6	5	32
13	(United States) Rob Hodes	(United Kingdom) Nielsen Racing	8	Ret	5	6	5	32
14	(United States) Jim McGuire	(United Kingdom) United Autosports	7	5		11	4	28.5
15	(Germany) Laurents Hörr	(Luxembourg) DKR Engineering	10	6	6	7	10	24
15	(France) François Kirmann	(Luxembourg) DKR Engineering	10	6	6	7	10	24
16	(Brazil) Thomas Erdos	(United States) EuroInternational	6	3				23
17	(United Kingdom) Colin Noble	(United Kingdom) Nielsen Racing	Ret	2	Ret	8	11	22.5
17	(United Kingdom) Anthony Wells	(United Kingdom) Nielsen Racing	Ret	2	Ret	8	11	22.5
18	(Algeria) Julien Gerbi	(Switzerland) Realteam Racing					2	18
19	(United States) Robert Megennis	(United Kingdom) RLR MSport		7	4			18
20	(Germany) Wolfgang Triller	(Luxembourg) DKR Engineering	10		6	7	10	16
21	(United Kingdom) Ryan Harper-Ellam	(United Kingdom) RLR MSport	3					15
22	(Greece) Andreas Laskaratos	(United States) EuroInternational		3				15
23	(Switzerland) Sébastien Page	(France) Graff	11	8	9	12	9	9
23	(France) Eric Trouillet	(France) Graff	11	8	9	12	9	9
24	(Belgium) Jean Glorieux	(Luxembourg) DKR Engineering		6				8
25	(Switzerland) Luis Sanjuan	(France) Graff	11	8	9	12		7
26	(Italy) Lorenzo Veglia	(United Kingdom) BHK Motorsport (1–4) (United Kingdom) RLR MSport (5)	9	9	10	10	Ret	6
27	(Belgium) Tom Cloet	(United Kingdom) BHK Motorsport				10	8	5
28	(Lithuania) Julius Adomavičius	(United Kingdom) BHK Motorsport					8	4
28	(Switzerland) Alex Fontana	(United Kingdom) BHK Motorsport					8	4
29	(Italy) Andrea Fontana	(United Kingdom) BHK Motorsport	9	9				4
30	(Lithuania) Gustas Grinbergas	(United Kingdom) BHK Motorsport (3) (United Kingdom) RLR MSport (4)			10	9		3
31	(United Kingdom) Nick Adock	(United Kingdom) BHK Motorsport			10			1
32	(France) Philippe Paillot	(United Kingdom) BHK Motorsport				10		1
Pos.	Driver	Team	RIC (France)	SPA (Belgium)	LEC (France)	MNZ (Italy)	POR (Portugal)	Points

Key
Colour	Result
Gold	Race winner
Silver	2nd place
Bronze	3rd place
Green	Points finish
Blue	Non-points finish
Blue	Non-classified finish (NC)
Purple	Did not finish (Ret)
Black	Disqualified (DSQ)
Black	Excluded (EX)
White	Did not start (DNS)
White	Race cancelled (C)
White	Withdrew (WD)
Blank	Did not participate

**Bold** – Pole
Italics – Fastest Lap

=== LMGTE Drivers Championship ===
Pos.	Driver	Team	RIC (France)	SPA (Belgium)	LEC (France)	MNZ (Italy)	POR (Portugal)	Points
1	(Italy) Michele Beretta	(Germany) Proton Competition	1	6	**2**	2	1	99
1	(Belgium) Alessio Picariello	(Germany) Proton Competition	1	6	**2**	2	1	99
1	(Germany) Christian Ried	(Germany) Proton Competition	1	6	**2**	2	1	99
2	(Poland) Michał Broniszewski	(Switzerland) Kessel Racing	**2**	1	4	1	2	99
2	(South Africa) David Perel	(Switzerland) Kessel Racing	**2**	1	4	1	2	99
3	(United Kingdom) Duncan Cameron	(Switzerland) Spirit of Race	Ret	5	1	4	5	62
3	(Republic of Ireland) Matt Griffin	(Switzerland) Spirit of Race	Ret	5	1	4	5	62
3	(United Kingdom) Aaron Scott	(Switzerland) Spirit of Race	Ret	5	1	4	5	62
4	(Italy) Nicola Cadei	(Switzerland) Kessel Racing	**2**			1	2	62
5	(Switzerland) Rahel Frey	(Italy) Iron Lynx	3	8	3	3	6	61
5	(Denmark) Michelle Gatting	(Italy) Iron Lynx	3	8	3	3	6	61
5	(Italy) Manuela Gostner	(Italy) Iron Lynx	3	8	3	3	6	61
6	(Republic of Ireland) Michael Fassbender	(Germany) Proton Competition	7	**4**	DNS	5	4	47
6	(Germany) Felipe Fernández Laser	(Germany) Proton Competition	7	**4**	DNS	5	4	47
6	(Austria) Richard Lietz	(Germany) Proton Competition	7	**4**	DNS	5	4	47
7	(United Kingdom) Finlay Hutchison	(United Kingdom) JMW Motorsport	4	9	7	6	7	38
8	(Brazil) Marcos Gomes	(Switzerland) Kessel Racing		1	4			37
9	(Switzerland) Christoph Ulrich	(Italy) AF Corse	5	7	6		Ret	28
9	(Germany) Steffen Görig	(Italy) AF Corse	5	7	6		Ret	28
10	(Italy) Rino Mastronardi	(Italy) Iron Lynx			5		**3**	26
11	(United States) Gunnar Jeannette	(United Kingdom) JMW Motorsport		9	7	6	7	26
11	(United States) Rodrigo Sales	(United Kingdom) JMW Motorsport		9	7	6	7	26
12	(Italy) Sergio Pianezzola	(Italy) Iron Lynx	6	Ret		**Ret**	**3**	25
12	(Italy) Andrea Piccini	(Italy) Iron Lynx	6	Ret		**Ret**	**3**	25
13	(Sweden) Alexander West	(Italy) AF Corse	5	7			Ret	20
14	(Italy) Claudio Schiavoni	(Italy) Iron Lynx	6	Ret	5	**Ret**		19
15	(United Kingdom) Hunter Abbott	(United Kingdom) JMW Motorsport	4					12
15	(United Kingdom) Jody Fannin	(United Kingdom) JMW Motorsport	4					12
16	(Denmark) Nicklas Nielsen	(Italy) Iron Lynx			5			10
17	(Brazil) Daniel Serra	(Italy) AF Corse			6			8
Entries ineligible to score points
–	(France) Emmanuel Collard	(Italy) AF Corse		2			8	–
–	(France) François Perrodo	(Italy) AF Corse		2			8	–
–	(United Kingdom) Harrison Newey	(Italy) AF Corse		2				–
–	(Canada) Paul Dalla Lana	(United Kingdom) Aston Martin Racing	Ret	3				–
–	(Austria) Mathias Lauda	(United Kingdom) Aston Martin Racing	Ret	3				–
–	(Brazil) Augusto Farfus	(United Kingdom) Aston Martin Racing		3				–
–	(Italy) Alessio Rovera	(Italy) AF Corse					8	–
–	(United Kingdom) Ross Gunn	(United Kingdom) Aston Martin Racing	Ret					–
–	(Italy) Francesco Castellacci	(Italy) AF Corse		Ret				–
–	(Switzerland) Thomas Flohr	(Italy) AF Corse		Ret				–
–	(United Kingdom) Ben Barker	(United Kingdom) Gulf Racing UK					Ret	–
–	(United Kingdom) Michael Wainwright	(United Kingdom) Gulf Racing UK					Ret	–
–	(United Kingdom) Andrew Watson	(United Kingdom) Gulf Racing UK					Ret	–
–	(United Kingdom) Bonamy Grimes	(United Kingdom) Red River Sport		DNS				–
–	(United Kingdom) Charles Hollings	(United Kingdom) Red River Sport		DNS				–
–	(United Kingdom) Johnny Mowlem	(United Kingdom) Red River Sport		DNS				–
Pos.	Driver	Team	RIC (France)	SPA (Belgium)	LEC (France)	MNZ (Italy)	POR (Portugal)	Points

Key
Colour	Result
Gold	Race winner
Silver	2nd place
Bronze	3rd place
Green	Points finish
Blue	Non-points finish
Blue	Non-classified finish (NC)
Purple	Did not finish (Ret)
Black	Disqualified (DSQ)
Black	Excluded (EX)
White	Did not start (DNS)
White	Race cancelled (C)
White	Withdrew (WD)
Blank	Did not participate

**Bold** – Pole
Italics – Fastest Lap
