= 2020 4 Hours of Le Castellet =

1A-V2 layout of Circuit Paul Ricard used for this race

The 2020 4 Hours of Le Castellet was an endurance sportscar racing event that was held on 19 July 2020, as the opening round of the 2020 European Le Mans Series. It was also the eleventh running of an ELMS race at Paul Ricard, the eleventh running of a 4 hours race at this circuit and the seventh ELMS 4 hour. The race was won by the #32 United Autosports run Oreca 07-Gibson driven by Will Owen, Alex Brundle and Job van Uitert.

== Qualifying ==
Pole position winners in each class are marked in bold and with ‡.

Pos	Class	No.	Team	Driver	Time	Gap	Grid
1	**LMP2**	**22**	**(United Kingdom) United Autosports**	**(Portugal) Filipe Albuquerque**	**1:38.268**	—	1‡
2	LMP2	26	(Russia) G-Drive Racing	(Netherlands) Nyck de Vries	1:38.505	+0.237	2
3	LMP2	32	(United Kingdom) United Autosports	(United Kingdom) Alex Brundle	1:38.736	+0.468	3
4	LMP2	28	(France) IDEC Sport	(France) Paul-Loup Chatin	1:38.887	+0.619	4
5	LMP2	21	(United States) DragonSpeed USA	(United Kingdom) Ben Hanley	1:39.005	+0.737	5
6	LMP2	37	(Switzerland) Cool Racing	(France) Nicolas Lapierre	1:39.115	+0.847	6
7	LMP2	31	(France) Panis Racing	(United Kingdom) Will Stevens	1:39.400	+1.132	7
8	LMP2	24	(Portugal) Algarve Pro Racing	(France) Loïc Duval	1:39.430	+1.162	8
9	LMP2	25	(Portugal) Algarve Pro Racing	(France) Gabriel Aubry	1:39.476	+1.208	9
10	LMP2	30	(France) Duqueine Team	(France) Tristan Gommendy	1:39.506	+1.238	10
11	LMP2	39	(France) Graff Racing	(France) Thomas Laurent	1:39.573	+1.305	11
12	LMP2	20	(Denmark) High Class Racing	(Denmark) Anders Fjordbach	1:39.957	+1.689	12
13	LMP2	50	(Switzerland) Richard Mille Racing Team	(Colombia) Tatiana Calderón	1:40.123	+1.855	13
14	LMP2	34	(Poland) Inter Europol Competition	(Russia) Matevos Isaakyan	1:40.129	+1.861	14
15	LMP2	35	(United Kingdom) BHK Motorsport	(Italy) Sergio Campana	1:40.777	+2.509	15
16	**LMP3**	**2**	**(United Kingdom) United Autosports**	**(United Kingdom) Wayne Boyd**	**1:48.315**	**+10.047**	16‡
17	LMP3	4	(Luxembourg) DKR Engineering	(Germany) Laurents Hörr	1:48.399	+10.131	17
18	LMP3	15	(United Kingdom) RLR MSport	(Denmark) Malthe Jakobsen	1:48.457	+10.189	18
19	LMP3	8	(Switzerland) Realteam Racing	(Switzerland) David Droux	1:48.485	+10.217	19
20	LMP3	3	(United Kingdom) United Autosports	(United Kingdom) Duncan Tappy	1:48.833	+10.565	20
21	LMP3	11	(United States) Eurointernational	(Finland) Niko Kari	1:48.842	+10.574	21
22	LMP3	13	(Poland) Inter Europol Competition	(United Kingdom) Nigel Moore	1:48.874	+10.606	22
23	LMP3	10	(United Kingdom) Nielsen Racing	(Canada) Garett Grist	1:49.611	+11.343	23
24	LMP3	9	(France) Graff Racing	(France) Vincent Capillaire	1:49.632	+11.364	24
25	LMP3	7	(United Kingdom) Nielsen Racing	(United Kingdom) Colin Noble	1:49.806	+11.538	25
26	LMP3	16	(United Kingdom) BHK Motorsport	(Italy) Andrea Fontana	1:50.082	+11.814	26
27	LMP3	5	(France) Graff Racing	(France) Eric Trouillet	1:50.673	+12.405	27
28	**LMGTE**	**74**	**(Switzerland) Kessel Racing**	**(Italy) Nicola Cadei**	**1:51.729**	**+13.461**	28‡
29	LMGTE	98	(United Kingdom) Aston Martin Racing	(United Kingdom) Ross Gunn	1:51.745	+13.477	29
30	LMGTE	55	(Switzerland) Spirit of Race	(Republic of Ireland) Matt Griffin	1:51.780	+13.512	30
31	LMGTE	77	(Germany) Proton Competition	(Belgium) Alessio Picariello	1:51.781	+13.513	31
32	LMGTE	60	(Italy) Iron Lynx	(Italy) Andrea Piccini	1:51.843	+13.575	32
33	LMGTE	93	(Germany) Proton Competition	(Austria) Richard Lietz	1:51.892	+13.624	33
34	LMGTE	83	(Italy) Iron Lynx	(Denmark) Michelle Gatting	1:52.437	+14.169	34
35	LMGTE	66	(United Kingdom) JMW Motorsport	(United Kingdom) Jody Fannin	1:52.820	+14.552	35
36	LMGTE	51	(Italy) AF Corse	(Switzerland) Christoph Ulrich	1:53.870	+15.602	36

== Results ==
=== Race ===
The minimum number of laps for classification (70% of the overall winning car's race distance) was 93 laps. Class winners are denoted in bold and with ‡.

Pos.	Class	No.	Team	Drivers	Chassis	Tyre	Laps	Time/Retired
Pos.	Class	No.	Team	Drivers	Engine	Tyre	Laps	Time/Retired
1	**LMP2**	**32**	**(United Kingdom) United Autosports**	**(United Kingdom) Alex Brundle (United States) Will Owen (Netherlands) Job van Uitert**	**Oreca 07**	MI	**132**	**4:00:50.054‡**
1	**LMP2**	**32**	**(United Kingdom) United Autosports**	**(United Kingdom) Alex Brundle (United States) Will Owen (Netherlands) Job van Uitert**	**Gibson GK428 4.2 L V8**	MI	**132**	**4:00:50.054‡**
2	LMP2	26	(Russia) G-Drive Racing	(Netherlands) Nyck de Vries (Denmark) Mikkel Jensen (Russia) Roman Rusinov	Aurus 01	MI	132	+21.146 s
2	LMP2	26	(Russia) G-Drive Racing	(Netherlands) Nyck de Vries (Denmark) Mikkel Jensen (Russia) Roman Rusinov	Gibson GK428 4.2 L V8	MI	132	+21.146 s
3	LMP2	22	(United Kingdom) United Autosports	(Portugal) Filipe Albuquerque (United Kingdom) Philip Hanson	Oreca 07	MI	132	+34.073 s
3	LMP2	22	(United Kingdom) United Autosports	(Portugal) Filipe Albuquerque (United Kingdom) Philip Hanson	Gibson GK428 4.2 L V8	MI	132	+34.073 s
4	LMP2	37	(Switzerland) Cool Racing	(Switzerland) Antonin Borga (Switzerland) Alexandre Coigny (France) Nicolas Lapierre	Oreca 07	MI	132	+50.418 s
4	LMP2	37	(Switzerland) Cool Racing	(Switzerland) Antonin Borga (Switzerland) Alexandre Coigny (France) Nicolas Lapierre	Gibson GK428 4.2 L V8	MI	132	+50.418 s
5	LMP2	50	(Switzerland) Richard Mille Racing Team	(Colombia) Tatiana Calderón (Brazil) André Negrão	Oreca 07	MI	132	+1:26.960
5	LMP2	50	(Switzerland) Richard Mille Racing Team	(Colombia) Tatiana Calderón (Brazil) André Negrão	Gibson GK428 4.2 L V8	MI	132	+1:26.960
6	LMP2	24	(Portugal) Algarve Pro Racing	(France) Loïc Duval (Sweden) Henning Enqvist (United Kingdom) Jon Lancaster	Oreca 07	G	131	+1 Lap
6	LMP2	24	(Portugal) Algarve Pro Racing	(France) Loïc Duval (Sweden) Henning Enqvist (United Kingdom) Jon Lancaster	Gibson GK428 4.2 L V8	G	131	+1 Lap
7	LMP2	34	(Poland) Inter Europol Competition	(Austria) René Binder (Russia) Matevos Isaakyan (Poland) Jakub Śmiechowski	Ligier JS P217	MI	131	+1 Lap
7	LMP2	34	(Poland) Inter Europol Competition	(Austria) René Binder (Russia) Matevos Isaakyan (Poland) Jakub Śmiechowski	Gibson GK428 4.2 L V8	MI	131	+1 Lap
8	LMP2	21	(United States) DragonSpeed USA	(Republic of Ireland) Ryan Cullen (United Kingdom) Ben Hanley (Mexico) Memo Rojas	Oreca 07	MI	131	+1 Lap
8	LMP2	21	(United States) DragonSpeed USA	(Republic of Ireland) Ryan Cullen (United Kingdom) Ben Hanley (Mexico) Memo Rojas	Gibson GK428 4.2 L V8	MI	131	+1 Lap
9	LMP2	39	(France) Graff Racing	(Australia) James Allen (France) Alexandre Cougnaud (France) Thomas Laurent	Oreca 07	MI	129	+3 Laps
9	LMP2	39	(France) Graff Racing	(Australia) James Allen (France) Alexandre Cougnaud (France) Thomas Laurent	Gibson GK428 4.2 L V8	MI	129	+3 Laps
10	LMP2	25	(Portugal) Algarve Pro Racing	(France) Gabriel Aubry (United States) John Falb (Switzerland) Simon Trummer	Oreca 07	G	129	+3 Laps
10	LMP2	25	(Portugal) Algarve Pro Racing	(France) Gabriel Aubry (United States) John Falb (Switzerland) Simon Trummer	Gibson GK428 4.2 L V8	G	129	+3 Laps
11	**LMP3**	**2**	**(United Kingdom) United Autosports**	**(United Kingdom) Wayne Boyd (United Kingdom) Tom Gamble (United Kingdom) Robert Wheldon**	**Ligier JS P320**	MI	**122**	**+10 Laps‡**
11	**LMP3**	**2**	**(United Kingdom) United Autosports**	**(United Kingdom) Wayne Boyd (United Kingdom) Tom Gamble (United Kingdom) Robert Wheldon**	**Nissan VK56DE 5.6 L V8**	MI	**122**	**+10 Laps‡**
12	LMP3	13	(Poland) Inter Europol Competition	(Germany) Martin Hippe (United Kingdom) Nigel Moore	Ligier JS P320	MI	122	+10 Laps
12	LMP3	13	(Poland) Inter Europol Competition	(Germany) Martin Hippe (United Kingdom) Nigel Moore	Nissan VK56DE 5.6 L V8	MI	122	+10 Laps
13	LMP3	15	(United Kingdom) RLR MSport	(Canada) James Dayson (United Kingdom) Ryan Harper-Ellam (Denmark) Malthe Jakobsen	Ligier JS P320	MI	121	+11 Laps
13	LMP3	15	(United Kingdom) RLR MSport	(Canada) James Dayson (United Kingdom) Ryan Harper-Ellam (Denmark) Malthe Jakobsen	Nissan VK56DE 5.6 L V8	MI	121	+11 Laps
14	LMP3	8	(Switzerland) Realteam Racing	(Switzerland) David Droux (Switzerland) Esteban Garcia	Ligier JS P320	MI	121	+11 Laps
14	LMP3	8	(Switzerland) Realteam Racing	(Switzerland) David Droux (Switzerland) Esteban Garcia	Nissan VK56DE 5.6 L V8	MI	121	+11 Laps
15	LMP3	9	(France) Graff Racing	(France) Vincent Capillaire (France) Arnold Robin (France) Maxime Robin	Ligier JS P320	MI	121	+11 Laps
15	LMP3	9	(France) Graff Racing	(France) Vincent Capillaire (France) Arnold Robin (France) Maxime Robin	Nissan VK56DE 5.6 L V8	MI	121	+11 Laps
16	LMP3	11	(United States) Eurointernational	(Brazil) Thomas Erdos (Finland) Niko Kari	Ligier JS P320	MI	121	+11 Laps
16	LMP3	11	(United States) Eurointernational	(Brazil) Thomas Erdos (Finland) Niko Kari	Nissan VK56DE 5.6 L V8	MI	121	+11 Laps
17	**LMGTE**	**77**	**(Germany) Proton Competition**	**(Italy) Michele Beretta (Belgium) Alessio Picariello (Germany) Christian Ried**	**Porsche 911 RSR**	G	**121**	**+11 Laps‡**
17	**LMGTE**	**77**	**(Germany) Proton Competition**	**(Italy) Michele Beretta (Belgium) Alessio Picariello (Germany) Christian Ried**	**Porsche 4.0 L Flat-6**	G	**121**	**+11 Laps‡**
18	LMP3	3	(United Kingdom) United Autosports	(United Kingdom) Andrew Bentley (United States) Jim McGuire (United Kingdom) Duncan Tappy	Ligier JS P320	MI	120	+12 Laps
18	LMP3	3	(United Kingdom) United Autosports	(United Kingdom) Andrew Bentley (United States) Jim McGuire (United Kingdom) Duncan Tappy	Nissan VK56DE 5.6 L V8	MI	120	+12 Laps
19	LMGTE	74	(Switzerland) Kessel Racing	(Poland) Michael Broniszewski (Italy) Nicola Cadei (South Africa) David Perel	Ferrari 488 GTE Evo	G	120	+12 Laps
19	LMGTE	74	(Switzerland) Kessel Racing	(Poland) Michael Broniszewski (Italy) Nicola Cadei (South Africa) David Perel	Ferrari F154CB 3.9 L Turbo V8	G	120	+12 Laps
20	LMGTE	83	(Italy) Iron Lynx	(Switzerland) Rahel Frey (Denmark) Michelle Gatting (Italy) Manuela Gostner	Ferrari 488 GTE Evo	G	120	+12 Laps
20	LMGTE	83	(Italy) Iron Lynx	(Switzerland) Rahel Frey (Denmark) Michelle Gatting (Italy) Manuela Gostner	Ferrari F154CB 3.9 L Turbo V8	G	120	+12 Laps
21	LMP3	10	(United Kingdom) Nielsen Racing	(United States) Charles Crews (Canada) Garett Grist (United States) Rob Hodes	Duqueine M30 – D08	MI	120	+12 Laps
21	LMP3	10	(United Kingdom) Nielsen Racing	(United States) Charles Crews (Canada) Garett Grist (United States) Rob Hodes	Nissan VK56DE 5.6 L V8	MI	120	+12 Laps
22	LMP3	16	(United Kingdom) BHK Motorsport	(Italy) Jacopo Baratto (Italy) Andrea Fontana (Italy) Lorenzo Veglia	Ligier JS P320	MI	120	+12 Laps
22	LMP3	16	(United Kingdom) BHK Motorsport	(Italy) Jacopo Baratto (Italy) Andrea Fontana (Italy) Lorenzo Veglia	Nissan VK56DE 5.6 L V8	MI	120	+12 Laps
23	LMGTE	66	(United Kingdom) JMW Motorsport	(United Kingdom) Hunter Abbott (United Kingdom) Jody Fannin (United Kingdom) Finlay Hutchison	Ferrari 488 GTE Evo	G	120	+12 Laps
23	LMGTE	66	(United Kingdom) JMW Motorsport	(United Kingdom) Hunter Abbott (United Kingdom) Jody Fannin (United Kingdom) Finlay Hutchison	Ferrari F154CB 3.9 L Turbo V8	G	120	+12 Laps
24	LMP3	4	(Luxembourg) DKR Engineering	(Germany) Laurents Hörr (France) François Kirmann (Germany) Wolfgang Triller	Duqueine M30 – D08	MI	119	+13 Laps
24	LMP3	4	(Luxembourg) DKR Engineering	(Germany) Laurents Hörr (France) François Kirmann (Germany) Wolfgang Triller	Nissan VK56DE 5.6 L V8	MI	119	+13 Laps
25	LMGTE	51	(Italy) AF Corse	(Germany) Steffen Görig (Switzerland) Christoph Ulrich (Sweden) Alexander West	Ferrari 488 GTE Evo	G	119	+13 Laps
25	LMGTE	51	(Italy) AF Corse	(Germany) Steffen Görig (Switzerland) Christoph Ulrich (Sweden) Alexander West	Ferrari F154CB 3.9 L Turbo V8	G	119	+13 Laps
26	LMGTE	60	(Italy) Iron Lynx	(Italy) Sergio Pianezzola (Italy) Andrea Piccini (Italy) Claudio Schiavoni	Ferrari 488 GTE Evo	G	119	+13 Laps
26	LMGTE	60	(Italy) Iron Lynx	(Italy) Sergio Pianezzola (Italy) Andrea Piccini (Italy) Claudio Schiavoni	Ferrari F154CB 3.9 L Turbo V8	G	119	+13 Laps
27	LMGTE	93	(Germany) Proton Competition	(Republic of Ireland) Michael Fassbender (Germany) Felipe Fernández Laser (Austria) Richard Lietz	Porsche 911 RSR	G	115	+17 Laps
27	LMGTE	93	(Germany) Proton Competition	(Republic of Ireland) Michael Fassbender (Germany) Felipe Fernández Laser (Austria) Richard Lietz	Porsche 4.0 L Flat-6	G	115	+17 Laps
28	LMP3	5	(France) Graff Racing	(Switzerland) Sébastien Page (Switzerland) Luis Sanjuan (France) Eric Trouillet	Duqueine M30 – D08	MI	113	+19 Laps
28	LMP3	5	(France) Graff Racing	(Switzerland) Sébastien Page (Switzerland) Luis Sanjuan (France) Eric Trouillet	Nissan VK56DE 5.6 L V8	MI	113	+19 Laps
DNF	LMP2	20	(Denmark) High Class Racing	(Denmark) Dennis Andersen (Denmark) Anders Fjordbach	Oreca 07	MI	131	Out of fuel
DNF	LMP2	20	(Denmark) High Class Racing	(Denmark) Dennis Andersen (Denmark) Anders Fjordbach	Gibson GK428 4.2 L V8	MI	131	Out of fuel
DNF	LMGTE	98	(United Kingdom) Aston Martin Racing	(Canada) Paul Dalla Lana (United Kingdom) Ross Gunn (Austria) Mathias Lauda	Aston Martin Vantage AMR	G	119	Puncture
DNF	LMGTE	98	(United Kingdom) Aston Martin Racing	(Canada) Paul Dalla Lana (United Kingdom) Ross Gunn (Austria) Mathias Lauda	Mercedes-Benz M177 4.0 L Turbo V8	G	119	Puncture
DNF	LMP2	30	(France) Duqueine Team	(France) Tristan Gommendy (Switzerland) Jonathan Hirschi (Russia) Konstantin Tereshchenko	Oreca 07	MI	64	Accident damage
DNF	LMP2	30	(France) Duqueine Team	(France) Tristan Gommendy (Switzerland) Jonathan Hirschi (Russia) Konstantin Tereshchenko	Gibson GK428 4.2 L V8	MI	64	Accident damage
DNF	LMP2	31	(France) Panis Racing	(France) Julien Canal (France) Nico Jamin (United Kingdom) Will Stevens	Oreca 07	G	50	Suspension failure/ Accident
DNF	LMP2	31	(France) Panis Racing	(France) Julien Canal (France) Nico Jamin (United Kingdom) Will Stevens	Gibson GK428 4.2 L V8	G	50	Suspension failure/ Accident
DNF	LMP2	35	(United Kingdom) BHK Motorsport	(Italy) Sergio Campana (Italy) Francesco Dracone	Oreca 07	G	49	Electrical
DNF	LMP2	35	(United Kingdom) BHK Motorsport	(Italy) Sergio Campana (Italy) Francesco Dracone	Gibson GK428 4.2 L V8	G	49	Electrical
DNF	LMP2	28	(France) IDEC Sport	(United Kingdom) Richard Bradley (France) Paul-Loup Chatin (France) Paul Lafargue	Oreca 07	MI	33	Electronics
DNF	LMP2	28	(France) IDEC Sport	(United Kingdom) Richard Bradley (France) Paul-Loup Chatin (France) Paul Lafargue	Gibson GK428 4.2 L V8	MI	33	Electronics
DNF	LMGTE	55	(Switzerland) Spirit of Race	(United Kingdom) Duncan Cameron (Republic of Ireland) Matt Griffin (United Kingdom) Aaron Scott	Ferrari 488 GTE Evo	G	31	Accident damage
DNF	LMGTE	55	(Switzerland) Spirit of Race	(United Kingdom) Duncan Cameron (Republic of Ireland) Matt Griffin (United Kingdom) Aaron Scott	Ferrari F154CB 3.9 L Turbo V8	G	31	Accident damage
DNF	LMP3	7	(United Kingdom) Nielsen Racing	(United Kingdom) Colin Noble (United Kingdom) Anthony Wells	Duqueine M30 – D08	MI	9	Accident
DNF	LMP3	7	(United Kingdom) Nielsen Racing	(United Kingdom) Colin Noble (United Kingdom) Anthony Wells	Nissan VK56DE 5.6 L V8	MI	9	Accident

Tyre manufacturers
Key
Symbol	Tyre manufacturer
**G**	Goodyear
**MI**	Michelin

European Le Mans Series
Previous race: none	2020 season	Next race: 4 Hours of Spa-Francorchamps
