= 2020 4 Hours of Portimão =

Layout of Algarve International Circuit, where the race was held

The 2020 4 Hours of Portimão was an endurance sportscar racing event held on November 1, 2020, at Algarve International Circuit. It was the fifth and final round of the 2020 European Le Mans Series. The race was won by the #26 G-Drive Racing run Aurus 01-Gibson driven by Mikkel Jensen, Roman Rusinov and Nyck de Vries.

== Race ==
=== Race results ===
Class winners are in bold and ‡.

Pos	Class	No	Team	Drivers	Chassis	Tyre	Laps	Time/Retired
Pos	Class	No	Team	Drivers	Engine	Tyre	Laps	Time/Retired
1	**LMP2**	**26**	**(Russia) G-Drive Racing**	**(Denmark) Mikkel Jensen** **(Russia) Roman Rusinov** **(Netherlands) Nyck de Vries**	**Aurus 01**	MI	**147**	**4:01:10.768‡**
1	**LMP2**	**26**	**(Russia) G-Drive Racing**	**(Denmark) Mikkel Jensen** **(Russia) Roman Rusinov** **(Netherlands) Nyck de Vries**	**Gibson GK428 4.2 L V8**	MI	**147**	**4:01:10.768‡**
2	LMP2	30	(France) Duqueine Engineering	(France) Tristan Gommendy (Switzerland) Jonathan Hirschi (Russia) Konstantin Tereshchenko	Oreca 07	MI	147	+35.360
2	LMP2	30	(France) Duqueine Engineering	(France) Tristan Gommendy (Switzerland) Jonathan Hirschi (Russia) Konstantin Tereshchenko	Gibson GK428 4.2 L V8	MI	147	+35.360
3	LMP2	22	(United Kingdom) United Autosports	(United Kingdom) Phil Hanson (Portugal) Filipe Albuquerque	Oreca 07	MI	147	+56.411
3	LMP2	22	(United Kingdom) United Autosports	(United Kingdom) Phil Hanson (Portugal) Filipe Albuquerque	Gibson GK428 4.2 L V8	MI	147	+56.411
4	LMP2	32	(United Kingdom) United Autosports	(United Kingdom) Alex Brundle (United States) William Owen (Netherlands) Job van Uitert	Oreca 07	MI	147	+1:08.919
4	LMP2	32	(United Kingdom) United Autosports	(United Kingdom) Alex Brundle (United States) William Owen (Netherlands) Job van Uitert	Gibson GK428 4.2 L V8	MI	147	+1:08.919
5	LMP2	31	(France) Panis Racing	(France) Julien Canal (France) Nico Jamin (United Kingdom) Will Stevens	Oreca 07	G	147	+1:09.296
5	LMP2	31	(France) Panis Racing	(France) Julien Canal (France) Nico Jamin (United Kingdom) Will Stevens	Gibson GK428 4.2 L V8	G	147	+1:09.296
6	LMP2	20	(Denmark) High Class Racing	(Denmark) Dennis Andersen (Denmark) Anders Fjordbach	Oreca 07	MI	146	+1 Lap
6	LMP2	20	(Denmark) High Class Racing	(Denmark) Dennis Andersen (Denmark) Anders Fjordbach	Gibson GK428 4.2 L V8	MI	146	+1 Lap
7	LMP2	39	(France) Graff	(Australia) James Allen (France) Alexandre Cougnaud (France) Thomas Laurent	Oreca 07	MI	146	+1 Lap
7	LMP2	39	(France) Graff	(Australia) James Allen (France) Alexandre Cougnaud (France) Thomas Laurent	Gibson GK428 4.2 L V8	MI	146	+1 Lap
8	LMP2	25	(Portugal) Algarve Pro Racing	(France) Gabriel Aubry (United States) John Falb (India) Arjun Maini	Oreca 07	G	146	+1 Lap
8	LMP2	25	(Portugal) Algarve Pro Racing	(France) Gabriel Aubry (United States) John Falb (India) Arjun Maini	Gibson GK428 4.2 L V8	G	146	+1 Lap
9	LMP2	37	(Switzerland) Cool Racing	(Switzerland) Antonin Borga (Switzerland) Alexandre Coigny (France) Nicolas Lapierre	Oreca 07	MI	146	+1 Lap
9	LMP2	37	(Switzerland) Cool Racing	(Switzerland) Antonin Borga (Switzerland) Alexandre Coigny (France) Nicolas Lapierre	Gibson GK428 4.2 L V8	MI	146	+1 Lap
10	LMP2	28	(France) IDEC Sport	(United Kingdom) Richard Bradley (France) Paul Lafargue (France) Nicolas Minassian	Oreca 07	MI	146	+1 Lap
10	LMP2	28	(France) IDEC Sport	(United Kingdom) Richard Bradley (France) Paul Lafargue (France) Nicolas Minassian	Gibson GK428 4.2 L V8	MI	146	+1 Lap
11	LMP2	50	(Switzerland) Richard Mille Racing Team	(Colombia) Tatiana Calderón (Netherlands) Beitske Visser (Germany) Sophia Flörsch	Oreca 07	MI	145	+2 Laps
11	LMP2	50	(Switzerland) Richard Mille Racing Team	(Colombia) Tatiana Calderón (Netherlands) Beitske Visser (Germany) Sophia Flörsch	Gibson GK428 4.2 L V8	MI	145	+2 Laps
12	LMP2	24	(Portugal) Algarve Pro Racing	(Sweden) Henning Enqvist (United Kingdom) Jon Lancaster (France) Loïc Duval	Oreca 07	G	143	+4 Laps
12	LMP2	24	(Portugal) Algarve Pro Racing	(Sweden) Henning Enqvist (United Kingdom) Jon Lancaster (France) Loïc Duval	Gibson GK428 4.2 L V8	G	143	+4 Laps
13	LMP2	35	(United Kingdom) BHK Motorsport	(Italy) Sergio Campana (Italy) Francesco Dracone	Oreca 07	G	137	+10 Laps
13	LMP2	35	(United Kingdom) BHK Motorsport	(Italy) Sergio Campana (Italy) Francesco Dracone	Gibson GK428 4.2 L V8	G	137	+10 Laps
14	**LMP3**	**2**	**(United Kingdom) United Autosports**	**(United Kingdom) Wayne Boyd** **(United Kingdom) Tom Gamble** **(United Kingdom) Robert Wheldon**	**Ligier JS P320**	MI	**137**	**+10 Laps‡**
14	**LMP3**	**2**	**(United Kingdom) United Autosports**	**(United Kingdom) Wayne Boyd** **(United Kingdom) Tom Gamble** **(United Kingdom) Robert Wheldon**	**Nissan VK56DE 5.6 L V8**	MI	**137**	**+10 Laps‡**
15	LMP3	8	(Switzerland) Realteam Racing	(Algeria) Julien Gerbi (Switzerland) David Droux	Ligier JS P320	MI	136	+11 Laps
15	LMP3	8	(Switzerland) Realteam Racing	(Algeria) Julien Gerbi (Switzerland) David Droux	Nissan VK56DE 5.6 L V8	MI	136	+11 Laps
16	LMP3	13	(Poland) Inter Europol Competition	(Germany) Martin Hippe (France) Dino Lunardi	Ligier JS P320	MI	136	+11 Laps
16	LMP3	13	(Poland) Inter Europol Competition	(Germany) Martin Hippe (France) Dino Lunardi	Nissan VK56DE 5.6 L V8	MI	136	+11 Laps
17	LMP3	3	(United Kingdom) United Autosports	(United Kingdom) Andrew Bentley (United Kingdom) Duncan Tappy (United States) Jim McGuire	Ligier JS P320	MI	136	+11 Laps
17	LMP3	3	(United Kingdom) United Autosports	(United Kingdom) Andrew Bentley (United Kingdom) Duncan Tappy (United States) Jim McGuire	Nissan VK56DE 5.6 L V8	MI	136	+11 Laps
18	LMP3	10	(United Kingdom) Nielsen Racing	(United States) Charles Crews (Canada) Garett Grist (United States) Rob Hodes	Duqueine M30 – D08	MI	135	+12 Laps
18	LMP3	10	(United Kingdom) Nielsen Racing	(United States) Charles Crews (Canada) Garett Grist (United States) Rob Hodes	Nissan VK56DE 5.6 L V8	MI	135	+12 Laps
19	LMP3	11	(United States) Eurointernational	(Finland) Niko Kari (Italy) Jacopo Baratto (Switzerland) Nicolas Maulini	Ligier JS P320	MI	135	+12 Laps
19	LMP3	11	(United States) Eurointernational	(Finland) Niko Kari (Italy) Jacopo Baratto (Switzerland) Nicolas Maulini	Nissan VK56DE 5.6 L V8	MI	135	+12 Laps
20	LMP3	9	(France) Graff	(France) Vincent Capillaire (France) Arnold Robin (France) Maxime Robin	Ligier JS P320	MI	135	+12 Laps
20	LMP3	9	(France) Graff	(France) Vincent Capillaire (France) Arnold Robin (France) Maxime Robin	Nissan VK56DE 5.6 L V8	MI	135	+12 Laps
21	LMP3	16	(United Kingdom) BHK Motorsport	(Belgium) Tom Cloet (Lithuania) Julius Adomavičius (Switzerland) Alex Fontana	Ligier JS P320	MI	134	+13 Laps
21	LMP3	16	(United Kingdom) BHK Motorsport	(Belgium) Tom Cloet (Lithuania) Julius Adomavičius (Switzerland) Alex Fontana	Nissan VK56DE 5.6 L V8	MI	134	+13 Laps
22	**LMGTE**	**77**	**(Germany) Proton Competition**	**(Italy) Michele Beretta** **(Belgium) Alessio Picariello** **(Germany) Christian Ried**	**Porsche 911 RSR**	G	**134**	**+13 Laps‡**
22	**LMGTE**	**77**	**(Germany) Proton Competition**	**(Italy) Michele Beretta** **(Belgium) Alessio Picariello** **(Germany) Christian Ried**	**Porsche 4.0 L Flat-6**	G	**134**	**+13 Laps‡**
23	LMGTE	74	(Switzerland) Kessel Racing	(Poland) Michael Broniszewski (South Africa) David Perel (Italy) Nicola Cadei	Ferrari 488 GTE Evo	G	134	+13 Laps
23	LMGTE	74	(Switzerland) Kessel Racing	(Poland) Michael Broniszewski (South Africa) David Perel (Italy) Nicola Cadei	Ferrari F154CB 3.9 L Turbo V8	G	134	+13 Laps
24	LMGTE	60	(Italy) Iron Lynx	(Italy) Sergio Pianezzola (Italy) Rino Mastronardi (Italy) Andrea Piccini	Ferrari 488 GTE Evo	G	134	+13 Laps
24	LMGTE	60	(Italy) Iron Lynx	(Italy) Sergio Pianezzola (Italy) Rino Mastronardi (Italy) Andrea Piccini	Ferrari F154CB 3.9 L Turbo V8	G	134	+13 Laps
25	LMGTE	93	(Germany) Proton Competition	(Republic of Ireland) Michael Fassbender (Germany) Felipe Fernández Laser (Austria) Richard Lietz	Porsche 911 RSR	G	134	+13 Laps
25	LMGTE	93	(Germany) Proton Competition	(Republic of Ireland) Michael Fassbender (Germany) Felipe Fernández Laser (Austria) Richard Lietz	Porsche 4.0 L Flat-6	G	134	+13 Laps
26	LMGTE	55	(Switzerland) Spirit of Race	(United Kingdom) Duncan Cameron (Republic of Ireland) Matt Griffin (United Kingdom) Aaron Scott	Ferrari 488 GTE Evo	G	134	+13 Laps
26	LMGTE	55	(Switzerland) Spirit of Race	(United Kingdom) Duncan Cameron (Republic of Ireland) Matt Griffin (United Kingdom) Aaron Scott	Ferrari F154CB 3.9 L Turbo V8	G	134	+13 Laps
27	LMGTE	83	(Italy) Iron Lynx	(Switzerland) Rahel Frey (Denmark) Michelle Gatting (Italy) Manuela Gostner	Ferrari 488 GTE Evo	G	133	+14 Laps
27	LMGTE	83	(Italy) Iron Lynx	(Switzerland) Rahel Frey (Denmark) Michelle Gatting (Italy) Manuela Gostner	Ferrari F154CB 3.9 L Turbo V8	G	133	+14 Laps
28	LMP3	5	(France) Graff	(Switzerland) Sébastien Page (France) Eric Trouillet	Duqueine M30 – D08	MI	133	+14 Laps
28	LMP3	5	(France) Graff	(Switzerland) Sébastien Page (France) Eric Trouillet	Nissan VK56DE 5.6 L V8	MI	133	+14 Laps
29	LMGTE	66	(United Kingdom) JMW Motorsport	(United Kingdom) Finlay Hutchison (United States) Gunnar Jeannette (United States) Rodrigo Sales	Ferrari 488 GTE Evo	G	130	+17 Laps
29	LMGTE	66	(United Kingdom) JMW Motorsport	(United Kingdom) Finlay Hutchison (United States) Gunnar Jeannette (United States) Rodrigo Sales	Ferrari F154CB 3.9 L Turbo V8	G	130	+17 Laps
30	LMGTE	88	(Italy) AF Corse	(France) Emmanuel Collard (France) François Perrodo (Italy) Alessio Rovera	Ferrari 488 GTE Evo	G	130	+17 Laps
30	LMGTE	88	(Italy) AF Corse	(France) Emmanuel Collard (France) François Perrodo (Italy) Alessio Rovera	Ferrari F154CB 3.9 L Turbo V8	G	130	+17 Laps
31	LMP3	4	(Luxembourg) DKR Engineering	(Germany) Laurents Hörr (France) François Kirmann (Germany) Wolfgang Triller	Duqueine M30 – D08	MI	129	+18 Laps
31	LMP3	4	(Luxembourg) DKR Engineering	(Germany) Laurents Hörr (France) François Kirmann (Germany) Wolfgang Triller	Nissan VK56DE 5.6 L V8	MI	129	+18 Laps
32	LMP3	7	(United Kingdom) Nielsen Racing	(United Kingdom) Colin Noble (United Kingdom) Anthony Wells	Duqueine M30 – D08	MI	115	+32 Laps
32	LMP3	7	(United Kingdom) Nielsen Racing	(United Kingdom) Colin Noble (United Kingdom) Anthony Wells	Nissan VK56DE 5.6 L V8	MI	115	+32 Laps
33	LMP2	34	(Poland) Inter Europol Competition	(Austria) René Binder (Poland) Jakub Śmiechowski	Ligier JS P217	MI	141	Did not finish
33	LMP2	34	(Poland) Inter Europol Competition	(Austria) René Binder (Poland) Jakub Śmiechowski	Gibson GK428 4.2 L V8	MI	141	Did not finish
34	LMP3	15	(United Kingdom) RLR MSport	(Canada) James Dayson (Denmark) Malthe Jakobsen (Italy) Lorenzo Veglia	Ligier JS P320	MI	129	Did not finish
34	LMP3	15	(United Kingdom) RLR MSport	(Canada) James Dayson (Denmark) Malthe Jakobsen (Italy) Lorenzo Veglia	Nissan VK56DE 5.6 L V8	MI	129	Did not finish
35	LMGTE	86	(United Kingdom) Gulf Racing UK	(United Kingdom) Ben Barker (United Kingdom) Michael Wainwright (United Kingdom) Andrew Watson	Porsche 911 RSR	G	75	Did not finish
35	LMGTE	86	(United Kingdom) Gulf Racing UK	(United Kingdom) Ben Barker (United Kingdom) Michael Wainwright (United Kingdom) Andrew Watson	Porsche 4.0 L Flat-6	G	75	Did not finish
36	LMGTE	51	(Italy) AF Corse	(Germany) Steffen Görig (Switzerland) Christoph Ulrich (Sweden) Alexander West	Ferrari 488 GTE Evo	G	70	Did not finish
36	LMGTE	51	(Italy) AF Corse	(Germany) Steffen Görig (Switzerland) Christoph Ulrich (Sweden) Alexander West	Ferrari F154CB 3.9 L Turbo V8	G	70	Did not finish

European Le Mans Series
Previous race: 4 Hours of Monza	2020 season	Next race: none
