= 2020 4 Hours of Monza =

Layout of Autodromo Nazionale di Monza, where the race was held

The 2020 4 Hours of Monza was an endurance sportscar racing event held on October 11, 2020, at Autodromo Nazionale di Monza. It was the fourth round of the 2020 European Le Mans Series. The race was won by the #22 United Autosports run Oreca 07-Gibson driven by Filipe Albuquerque and Phil Hanson who also claimed the LMP2 drivers and teams championships.

== Race ==
=== Race results ===
Class winners are in bold and ‡.

Pos	Class	No	Team	Drivers	Chassis	Tyre	Laps	Time/Retired
Pos	Class	No	Team	Drivers	Engine	Tyre	Laps	Time/Retired
1	**LMP2**	**22**	**(United Kingdom) United Autosports**	**(United Kingdom) Phil Hanson** **(Portugal) Filipe Albuquerque**	**Oreca 07**	MI	**135**	**4:00:07.963‡**
1	**LMP2**	**22**	**(United Kingdom) United Autosports**	**(United Kingdom) Phil Hanson** **(Portugal) Filipe Albuquerque**	**Gibson GK428 4.2 L V8**	MI	**135**	**4:00:07.963‡**
2	LMP2	32	(United Kingdom) United Autosports	(United Kingdom) Alex Brundle (United States) William Owen (Netherlands) Job van Uitert	Oreca 07	MI	135	+3.057
2	LMP2	32	(United Kingdom) United Autosports	(United Kingdom) Alex Brundle (United States) William Owen (Netherlands) Job van Uitert	Gibson GK428 4.2 L V8	MI	135	+3.057
3	LMP2	20	(Denmark) High Class Racing	(Denmark) Dennis Andersen (Denmark) Anders Fjordbach	Oreca 07	MI	135	+55.749
3	LMP2	20	(Denmark) High Class Racing	(Denmark) Dennis Andersen (Denmark) Anders Fjordbach	Gibson GK428 4.2 L V8	MI	135	+55.749
4	LMP2	37	(Switzerland) Cool Racing	(Switzerland) Antonin Borga (Switzerland) Alexandre Coigny (France) Nicolas Lapierre	Oreca 07	MI	135	+56.249
4	LMP2	37	(Switzerland) Cool Racing	(Switzerland) Antonin Borga (Switzerland) Alexandre Coigny (France) Nicolas Lapierre	Gibson GK428 4.2 L V8	MI	135	+56.249
5	LMP2	31	(France) Panis Racing	(France) Julien Canal (France) Nico Jamin (United Kingdom) Will Stevens	Oreca 07	G	135	+1:16.462
5	LMP2	31	(France) Panis Racing	(France) Julien Canal (France) Nico Jamin (United Kingdom) Will Stevens	Gibson GK428 4.2 L V8	G	135	+1:16.462
6	LMP2	28	(France) IDEC Sport	(United Kingdom) Richard Bradley (France) Paul Lafargue (France) Nicolas Minassian	Oreca 07	MI	135	+1:29.410
6	LMP2	28	(France) IDEC Sport	(United Kingdom) Richard Bradley (France) Paul Lafargue (France) Nicolas Minassian	Gibson GK428 4.2 L V8	MI	135	+1:29.410
7	LMP2	30	(France) Duqueine Engineering	(France) Tristan Gommendy (Switzerland) Jonathan Hirschi (Russia) Konstantin Tereshchenko	Oreca 07	MI	135	+1:36.349
7	LMP2	30	(France) Duqueine Engineering	(France) Tristan Gommendy (Switzerland) Jonathan Hirschi (Russia) Konstantin Tereshchenko	Gibson GK428 4.2 L V8	MI	135	+1:36.349
8	LMP2	24	(Portugal) Algarve Pro Racing	(Sweden) Henning Enqvist (United Kingdom) Jon Lancaster (India) Arjun Maini	Oreca 07	G	134	+1 Lap
8	LMP2	24	(Portugal) Algarve Pro Racing	(Sweden) Henning Enqvist (United Kingdom) Jon Lancaster (India) Arjun Maini	Gibson GK428 4.2 L V8	G	134	+1 Lap
9	LMP2	39	(France) Graff	(Australia) James Allen (France) Alexandre Cougnaud (France) Thomas Laurent	Oreca 07	MI	134	+1 Lap
9	LMP2	39	(France) Graff	(Australia) James Allen (France) Alexandre Cougnaud (France) Thomas Laurent	Gibson GK428 4.2 L V8	MI	134	+1 Lap
10	LMP2	50	(Switzerland) Richard Mille Racing Team	(Colombia) Tatiana Calderón (Netherlands) Beitske Visser (Germany) Sophia Flörsch	Oreca 07	MI	134	+1 Lap
10	LMP2	50	(Switzerland) Richard Mille Racing Team	(Colombia) Tatiana Calderón (Netherlands) Beitske Visser (Germany) Sophia Flörsch	Gibson GK428 4.2 L V8	MI	134	+1 Lap
11	LMP2	25	(Portugal) Algarve Pro Racing	(France) Gabriel Aubry (United States) John Falb (Switzerland) Simon Trummer	Oreca 07	G	134	+1 Lap
11	LMP2	25	(Portugal) Algarve Pro Racing	(France) Gabriel Aubry (United States) John Falb (Switzerland) Simon Trummer	Gibson GK428 4.2 L V8	G	134	+1 Lap
12	LMP2	34	(Poland) Inter Europol Competition	(Austria) René Binder (Russia) Matevos Isaakyan (Poland) Jakub Śmiechowski	Ligier JS P217	MI	132	+3 Laps
12	LMP2	34	(Poland) Inter Europol Competition	(Austria) René Binder (Russia) Matevos Isaakyan (Poland) Jakub Śmiechowski	Gibson GK428 4.2 L V8	MI	132	+3 Laps
13	LMP2	35	(United Kingdom) BHK Motorsport	(Italy) Sergio Campana (Italy) Francesco Dracone	Oreca 07	G	132	+3 Laps
13	LMP2	35	(United Kingdom) BHK Motorsport	(Italy) Sergio Campana (Italy) Francesco Dracone	Gibson GK428 4.2 L V8	G	132	+3 Laps
14	**LMP3**	**13**	**(Poland) Inter Europol Competition**	**(Germany) Martin Hippe** **(France) Dino Lunardi**	**Ligier JS P320**	MI	**125**	**+10 Laps‡**
14	**LMP3**	**13**	**(Poland) Inter Europol Competition**	**(Germany) Martin Hippe** **(France) Dino Lunardi**	**Nissan VK56DE 5.6 L V8**	MI	**125**	**+10 Laps‡**
15	LMP3	11	(United States) Eurointernational	(Finland) Niko Kari (Italy) Jacopo Baratto (Switzerland) Nicolas Maulini	Ligier JS P320	MI	125	+10 Laps
15	LMP3	11	(United States) Eurointernational	(Finland) Niko Kari (Italy) Jacopo Baratto (Switzerland) Nicolas Maulini	Nissan VK56DE 5.6 L V8	MI	125	+10 Laps
16	LMP3	2	(United Kingdom) United Autosports	(United Kingdom) Wayne Boyd (United Kingdom) Tom Gamble (United Kingdom) Robert Wheldon	Ligier JS P320	MI	125	+10 Laps
16	LMP3	2	(United Kingdom) United Autosports	(United Kingdom) Wayne Boyd (United Kingdom) Tom Gamble (United Kingdom) Robert Wheldon	Nissan VK56DE 5.6 L V8	MI	125	+10 Laps
17	LMP3	8	(Switzerland) Realteam Racing	(Switzerland) Esteban García (Switzerland) David Droux	Ligier JS P320	MI	124	+11 Laps
17	LMP3	8	(Switzerland) Realteam Racing	(Switzerland) Esteban García (Switzerland) David Droux	Nissan VK56DE 5.6 L V8	MI	124	+11 Laps
18	LMP3	9	(France) Graff	(France) Vincent Capillaire (France) Arnold Robin (France) Maxime Robin	Ligier JS P320	MI	124	+11 Laps
18	LMP3	9	(France) Graff	(France) Vincent Capillaire (France) Arnold Robin (France) Maxime Robin	Nissan VK56DE 5.6 L V8	MI	124	+11 Laps
19	LMP3	10	(United Kingdom) Nielsen Racing	(United States) Charles Crews (Canada) Garett Grist (United States) Rob Hodes	Duqueine M30 – D08	MI	124	+11 Laps
19	LMP3	10	(United Kingdom) Nielsen Racing	(United States) Charles Crews (Canada) Garett Grist (United States) Rob Hodes	Nissan VK56DE 5.6 L V8	MI	124	+11 Laps
20	LMP3	4	(Luxembourg) DKR Engineering	(Germany) Laurents Hörr (France) François Kirmann (Germany) Wolfgang Triller	Duqueine M30 – D08	MI	124	+11 Laps
20	LMP3	4	(Luxembourg) DKR Engineering	(Germany) Laurents Hörr (France) François Kirmann (Germany) Wolfgang Triller	Nissan VK56DE 5.6 L V8	MI	124	+11 Laps
21	**LMGTE**	**74**	**(Switzerland) Kessel Racing**	**(Poland) Michael Broniszewski** **(South Africa) David Perel** **(Italy) Nicola Cadei**	**Ferrari 488 GTE Evo**	G	**124**	**+11 Laps‡**
21	**LMGTE**	**74**	**(Switzerland) Kessel Racing**	**(Poland) Michael Broniszewski** **(South Africa) David Perel** **(Italy) Nicola Cadei**	**Ferrari F154CB 3.9 L Turbo V8**	G	**124**	**+11 Laps‡**
22	LMGTE	77	(Germany) Proton Competition	(Italy) Michele Beretta (Belgium) Alessio Picariello (Germany) Christian Ried	Porsche 911 RSR	G	123	+12 Laps
22	LMGTE	77	(Germany) Proton Competition	(Italy) Michele Beretta (Belgium) Alessio Picariello (Germany) Christian Ried	Porsche 4.0 L Flat-6	G	123	+12 Laps
23	LMGTE	83	(Italy) Iron Lynx	(Switzerland) Rahel Frey (Denmark) Michelle Gatting (Italy) Manuela Gostner	Ferrari 488 GTE Evo	G	123	+12 Laps
23	LMGTE	83	(Italy) Iron Lynx	(Switzerland) Rahel Frey (Denmark) Michelle Gatting (Italy) Manuela Gostner	Ferrari F154CB 3.9 L Turbo V8	G	123	+12 Laps
24	LMGTE	55	(Switzerland) Spirit of Race	(United Kingdom) Duncan Cameron (Republic of Ireland) Matt Griffin (United Kingdom) Aaron Scott	Ferrari 488 GTE Evo	G	123	+12 Laps
24	LMGTE	55	(Switzerland) Spirit of Race	(United Kingdom) Duncan Cameron (Republic of Ireland) Matt Griffin (United Kingdom) Aaron Scott	Ferrari F154CB 3.9 L Turbo V8	G	123	+12 Laps
25	LMP3	7	(United Kingdom) Nielsen Racing	(United Kingdom) Colin Noble (United Kingdom) Anthony Wells	Duqueine M30 – D08	MI	123	+12 Laps
25	LMP3	7	(United Kingdom) Nielsen Racing	(United Kingdom) Colin Noble (United Kingdom) Anthony Wells	Nissan VK56DE 5.6 L V8	MI	123	+12 Laps
26	LMGTE	93	(Germany) Proton Competition	(Republic of Ireland) Michael Fassbender (Germany) Felipe Fernández Laser (Austria) Richard Lietz	Porsche 911 RSR	G	122	+13 Laps
26	LMGTE	93	(Germany) Proton Competition	(Republic of Ireland) Michael Fassbender (Germany) Felipe Fernández Laser (Austria) Richard Lietz	Porsche 4.0 L Flat-6	G	122	+13 Laps
27	LMP3	15	(United Kingdom) RLR MSport	(Canada) James Dayson (Denmark) Malthe Jakobsen (Lithuania) Gustas Grinbergas	Ligier JS P320	MI	122	+13 Laps
27	LMP3	15	(United Kingdom) RLR MSport	(Canada) James Dayson (Denmark) Malthe Jakobsen (Lithuania) Gustas Grinbergas	Nissan VK56DE 5.6 L V8	MI	122	+13 Laps
28	LMGTE	66	(United Kingdom) JMW Motorsport	(United Kingdom) Finlay Hutchison (United States) Gunnar Jeannette (United States) Rodrigo Sales	Ferrari 488 GTE Evo	G	122	+13 Laps
28	LMGTE	66	(United Kingdom) JMW Motorsport	(United Kingdom) Finlay Hutchison (United States) Gunnar Jeannette (United States) Rodrigo Sales	Ferrari F154CB 3.9 L Turbo V8	G	122	+13 Laps
29	LMP3	16	(United Kingdom) BHK Motorsport	(Italy) Lorenzo Veglia (Belgium) Tom Cloet (France) Philippe Paillot	Ligier JS P320	MI	121	+14 Laps
29	LMP3	16	(United Kingdom) BHK Motorsport	(Italy) Lorenzo Veglia (Belgium) Tom Cloet (France) Philippe Paillot	Nissan VK56DE 5.6 L V8	MI	121	+14 Laps
30	LMP3	3	(United Kingdom) United Autosports	(United Kingdom) Andrew Bentley (United Kingdom) Duncan Tappy (United States) Jim McGuire	Ligier JS P320	MI	121	+14 Laps
30	LMP3	3	(United Kingdom) United Autosports	(United Kingdom) Andrew Bentley (United Kingdom) Duncan Tappy (United States) Jim McGuire	Nissan VK56DE 5.6 L V8	MI	121	+14 Laps
31	LMP3	5	(France) Graff	(Switzerland) Sébastien Page (Switzerland) Luis Sanjuan (France) Eric Trouillet	Duqueine M30 – D08	MI	98	+37 Laps
31	LMP3	5	(France) Graff	(Switzerland) Sébastien Page (Switzerland) Luis Sanjuan (France) Eric Trouillet	Nissan VK56DE 5.6 L V8	MI	98	+37 Laps
32	LMP2	26	(Russia) G-Drive Racing	(Denmark) Mikkel Jensen (Russia) Roman Rusinov (Netherlands) Nyck de Vries	Aurus 01	MI	51	Radiator
32	LMP2	26	(Russia) G-Drive Racing	(Denmark) Mikkel Jensen (Russia) Roman Rusinov (Netherlands) Nyck de Vries	Gibson GK428 4.2 L V8	MI	51	Radiator
33	LMGTE	60	(Italy) Iron Lynx	(Italy) Sergio Pianezzola (Italy) Claudio Schiavoni (Italy) Andrea Piccini	Ferrari 488 GTE Evo	G	28	Suspension
33	LMGTE	60	(Italy) Iron Lynx	(Italy) Sergio Pianezzola (Italy) Claudio Schiavoni (Italy) Andrea Piccini	Ferrari F154CB 3.9 L Turbo V8	G	28	Suspension
34	LMP2	27	(United States) DragonSpeed	(United Kingdom) Ben Hanley (Sweden) Henrik Hedman (France) Charles Milesi	Oreca 07	MI	135	Disqualified
34	LMP2	27	(United States) DragonSpeed	(United Kingdom) Ben Hanley (Sweden) Henrik Hedman (France) Charles Milesi	Gibson GK428 4.2 L V8	MI	135	Disqualified

European Le Mans Series
Previous race: Le Castellet 240	2020 season	Next race: 4 Hours of Portimão
