= 2020 Le Castellet 240 =

Layout of Circuit Paul Ricard, where the race was held

The 2020 Le Castellet 240 was an endurance sportscar racing event held on August 29, 2020, at Circuit Paul Ricard. It was the third round of the 2020 European Le Mans Series and the eighth running of the event as part of the ELMS. This was the second race held this season at Paul Ricard after the round at Barcelona was cancelled due to rising cases of COVID-19 in Spain. The race was won by the #22 United Autosports run Oreca 07-Gibson driven by Filipe Albuquerque and Phil Hanson.

== Race ==
=== Race results ===
Class winners are in bold and ‡.

Pos	Class	No	Team	Drivers	Chassis	Tyre	Laps	Time/Retired
Pos	Class	No	Team	Drivers	Engine	Tyre	Laps	Time/Retired
1	**LMP2**	**22**	**(United Kingdom) United Autosports**	**(United Kingdom) Phil Hanson** **(Portugal) Filipe Albuquerque**	**Oreca 07**	MI	**118**	**4:00:25.979‡**
1	**LMP2**	**22**	**(United Kingdom) United Autosports**	**(United Kingdom) Phil Hanson** **(Portugal) Filipe Albuquerque**	**Gibson GK428 4.2 L V8**	MI	**118**	**4:00:25.979‡**
2	LMP2	26	(Russia) G-Drive Racing	(Denmark) Mikkel Jensen (Russia) Roman Rusinov (France) Jean-Éric Vergne	Aurus 01	MI	118	+2.618
2	LMP2	26	(Russia) G-Drive Racing	(Denmark) Mikkel Jensen (Russia) Roman Rusinov (France) Jean-Éric Vergne	Gibson GK428 4.2 L V8	MI	118	+2.618
3	LMP2	39	(France) Graff	(Australia) James Allen (France) Alexandre Cougnaud (France) Thomas Laurent	Oreca 07	MI	118	+12.047
3	LMP2	39	(France) Graff	(Australia) James Allen (France) Alexandre Cougnaud (France) Thomas Laurent	Gibson GK428 4.2 L V8	MI	118	+12.047
4	LMP2	31	(France) Panis Racing	(France) Julien Canal (France) Nico Jamin (United Kingdom) Will Stevens	Oreca 07	G	118	+17.673
4	LMP2	31	(France) Panis Racing	(France) Julien Canal (France) Nico Jamin (United Kingdom) Will Stevens	Gibson GK428 4.2 L V8	G	118	+17.673
5	LMP2	25	(Portugal) Algarve Pro Racing	(France) Gabriel Aubry (United States) John Falb (Switzerland) Simon Trummer	Oreca 07	G	118	+18.818
5	LMP2	25	(Portugal) Algarve Pro Racing	(France) Gabriel Aubry (United States) John Falb (Switzerland) Simon Trummer	Gibson GK428 4.2 L V8	G	118	+18.818
6	LMP2	34	(Poland) Inter Europol Competition	(Austria) René Binder (Russia) Matevos Isaakyan (Poland) Jakub Śmiechowski	Ligier JS P217	MI	118	+35.222
6	LMP2	34	(Poland) Inter Europol Competition	(Austria) René Binder (Russia) Matevos Isaakyan (Poland) Jakub Śmiechowski	Gibson GK428 4.2 L V8	MI	118	+35.222
7	LMP2	28	(France) IDEC Sport	(United Kingdom) Richard Bradley (France) Paul Lafargue (France) Paul-Loup Chatin	Oreca 07	MI	118	+40.722
7	LMP2	28	(France) IDEC Sport	(United Kingdom) Richard Bradley (France) Paul Lafargue (France) Paul-Loup Chatin	Gibson GK428 4.2 L V8	MI	118	+40.722
8	LMP2	32	(United Kingdom) United Autosports	(United Kingdom) Alex Brundle (United States) William Owen (Netherlands) Job van Uitert	Oreca 07	MI	118	+1:17.552
8	LMP2	32	(United Kingdom) United Autosports	(United Kingdom) Alex Brundle (United States) William Owen (Netherlands) Job van Uitert	Gibson GK428 4.2 L V8	MI	118	+1:17.552
9	LMP2	30	(France) Duqueine Engineering	(France) Tristan Gommendy (Switzerland) Jonathan Hirschi (Russia) Konstantin Tereshchenko	Oreca 07	MI	118	+1:30.449
9	LMP2	30	(France) Duqueine Engineering	(France) Tristan Gommendy (Switzerland) Jonathan Hirschi (Russia) Konstantin Tereshchenko	Gibson GK428 4.2 L V8	MI	118	+1:30.449
10	LMP2	21	(United States) DragonSpeed	(United Kingdom) Ben Hanley (Mexico) Memo Rojas (France) Timothé Buret	Oreca 07	MI	117	+1 Lap
10	LMP2	21	(United States) DragonSpeed	(United Kingdom) Ben Hanley (Mexico) Memo Rojas (France) Timothé Buret	Gibson GK428 4.2 L V8	MI	117	+1 Lap
11	LMP2	50	(Switzerland) Richard Mille Racing Team	(Netherlands) Beitske Visser (Germany) Sophia Flörsch	Oreca 07	MI	117	+1 Lap
11	LMP2	50	(Switzerland) Richard Mille Racing Team	(Netherlands) Beitske Visser (Germany) Sophia Flörsch	Gibson GK428 4.2 L V8	MI	117	+1 Lap
12	LMP2	37	(Switzerland) Cool Racing	(Switzerland) Antonin Borga (Switzerland) Alexandre Coigny (France) Nicolas Lapierre	Oreca 07	MI	117	+1 Lap
12	LMP2	37	(Switzerland) Cool Racing	(Switzerland) Antonin Borga (Switzerland) Alexandre Coigny (France) Nicolas Lapierre	Gibson GK428 4.2 L V8	MI	117	+1 Lap
13	LMP2	20	(Denmark) High Class Racing	(Denmark) Dennis Andersen (Denmark) Anders Fjordbach	Oreca 07	MI	116	+2 Laps
13	LMP2	20	(Denmark) High Class Racing	(Denmark) Dennis Andersen (Denmark) Anders Fjordbach	Gibson GK428 4.2 L V8	MI	116	+2 Laps
14	LMP2	35	(United Kingdom) BHK Motorsport	(Italy) Sergio Campana (Italy) Francesco Dracone	Oreca 07	G	114	+4 Laps
14	LMP2	35	(United Kingdom) BHK Motorsport	(Italy) Sergio Campana (Italy) Francesco Dracone	Gibson GK428 4.2 L V8	G	114	+4 Laps
15	**LMP3**	**8**	**(Switzerland) Realteam Racing**	**(Switzerland) Esteban García** **(Switzerland) David Droux**	**Ligier JS P320**	MI	**111**	**+7 Laps**
15	**LMP3**	**8**	**(Switzerland) Realteam Racing**	**(Switzerland) Esteban García** **(Switzerland) David Droux**	**Nissan VK56DE 5.6 L V8**	MI	**111**	**+7 Laps**
16	LMP3	3	(United Kingdom) United Autosports	(United Kingdom) Andrew Bentley (United Kingdom) Duncan Tappy	Ligier JS P320	MI	111	+7 Laps
16	LMP3	3	(United Kingdom) United Autosports	(United Kingdom) Andrew Bentley (United Kingdom) Duncan Tappy	Nissan VK56DE 5.6 L V8	MI	111	+7 Laps
17	LMP3	13	(Poland) Inter Europol Competition	(Germany) Martin Hippe (United Kingdom) Nigel Moore	Ligier JS P320	MI	111	+7 Laps
17	LMP3	13	(Poland) Inter Europol Competition	(Germany) Martin Hippe (United Kingdom) Nigel Moore	Nissan VK56DE 5.6 L V8	MI	111	+7 Laps
18	LMP3	15	(United Kingdom) RLR MSport	(Canada) James Dayson (Denmark) Malthe Jakobsen (United States) Robert Megennis	Ligier JS P320	MI	111	+7 Laps
18	LMP3	15	(United Kingdom) RLR MSport	(Canada) James Dayson (Denmark) Malthe Jakobsen (United States) Robert Megennis	Nissan VK56DE 5.6 L V8	MI	111	+7 Laps
19	LMP3	10	(United Kingdom) Nielsen Racing	(United States) Charles Crews (Canada) Garett Grist (United States) Rob Hodes	Duqueine M30 – D08	MI	110	+8 Laps
19	LMP3	10	(United Kingdom) Nielsen Racing	(United States) Charles Crews (Canada) Garett Grist (United States) Rob Hodes	Nissan VK56DE 5.6 L V8	MI	110	+8 Laps
20	**LMGTE**	**55**	**(Switzerland) Spirit of Race**	**(United Kingdom) Duncan Cameron** **(Republic of Ireland) Matt Griffin** **(United Kingdom) Aaron Scott**	**Ferrari 488 GTE Evo**	G	**110**	**+8 Laps**
20	**LMGTE**	**55**	**(Switzerland) Spirit of Race**	**(United Kingdom) Duncan Cameron** **(Republic of Ireland) Matt Griffin** **(United Kingdom) Aaron Scott**	**Ferrari F154CB 3.9 L Turbo V8**	G	**110**	**+8 Laps**
21	LMP3	4	(Luxembourg) DKR Engineering	(Germany) Laurents Hörr (France) François Kirmann (Germany) Wolfgang Triller	Duqueine M30 – D08	MI	110	+8 Laps
21	LMP3	4	(Luxembourg) DKR Engineering	(Germany) Laurents Hörr (France) François Kirmann (Germany) Wolfgang Triller	Nissan VK56DE 5.6 L V8	MI	110	+8 Laps
22	LMGTE	77	(Germany) Proton Competition	(Italy) Michele Beretta (Belgium) Alessio Picariello (Germany) Christian Ried	Porsche 911 RSR	G	110	+8 Laps
22	LMGTE	77	(Germany) Proton Competition	(Italy) Michele Beretta (Belgium) Alessio Picariello (Germany) Christian Ried	Porsche 4.0 L Flat-6	G	110	+8 Laps
23	LMGTE	83	(Italy) Iron Lynx	(Switzerland) Rahel Frey (Denmark) Michelle Gatting (Italy) Manuela Gostner	Ferrari 488 GTE Evo	G	109	+9 Laps
23	LMGTE	83	(Italy) Iron Lynx	(Switzerland) Rahel Frey (Denmark) Michelle Gatting (Italy) Manuela Gostner	Ferrari F154CB 3.9 L Turbo V8	G	109	+9 Laps
24	LMGTE	74	(Switzerland) Kessel Racing	(Poland) Michael Broniszewski (South Africa) David Perel (Brazil) Marcos Gomes	Ferrari 488 GTE Evo	G	109	+9 Laps
24	LMGTE	74	(Switzerland) Kessel Racing	(Poland) Michael Broniszewski (South Africa) David Perel (Brazil) Marcos Gomes	Ferrari F154CB 3.9 L Turbo V8	G	109	+9 Laps
25	LMP3	11	(United States) Eurointernational	(Finland) Niko Kari (Italy) Jacopo Baratto (Switzerland) Nicolas Maulini	Ligier JS P320	MI	109	+9 Laps
25	LMP3	11	(United States) Eurointernational	(Finland) Niko Kari (Italy) Jacopo Baratto (Switzerland) Nicolas Maulini	Nissan VK56DE 5.6 L V8	MI	109	+9 Laps
26	LMGTE	60	(Italy) Iron Lynx	(Denmark) Nicklas Nielsen (Italy) Claudio Schiavoni (Italy) Rino Mastronardi	Ferrari 488 GTE Evo	G	108	+10 Laps
26	LMGTE	60	(Italy) Iron Lynx	(Denmark) Nicklas Nielsen (Italy) Claudio Schiavoni (Italy) Rino Mastronardi	Ferrari F154CB 3.9 L Turbo V8	G	108	+10 Laps
27	LMGTE	51	(Italy) AF Corse	(Germany) Steffen Görig (Switzerland) Christoph Ulrich (Brazil) Daniel Serra	Ferrari 488 GTE Evo	G	108	+10 Laps
27	LMGTE	51	(Italy) AF Corse	(Germany) Steffen Görig (Switzerland) Christoph Ulrich (Brazil) Daniel Serra	Ferrari F154CB 3.9 L Turbo V8	G	108	+10 Laps
28	LMGTE	66	(United Kingdom) JMW Motorsport	(United Kingdom) Finlay Hutchison (United States) Gunnar Jeannette (United States) Rodrigo Sales	Ferrari 488 GTE Evo	G	108	+10 Laps
28	LMGTE	66	(United Kingdom) JMW Motorsport	(United Kingdom) Finlay Hutchison (United States) Gunnar Jeannette (United States) Rodrigo Sales	Ferrari F154CB 3.9 L Turbo V8	G	108	+10 Laps
29	LMP3	9	(France) Graff	(France) Vincent Capillaire (France) Arnold Robin (France) Maxime Robin	Ligier JS P320	MI	105	+13 Laps
29	LMP3	9	(France) Graff	(France) Vincent Capillaire (France) Arnold Robin (France) Maxime Robin	Nissan VK56DE 5.6 L V8	MI	105	+13 Laps
30	LMP3	5	(France) Graff	(Switzerland) Sébastien Page (Switzerland) Luis Sanjuan (France) Eric Trouillet	Duqueine M30 – D08	MI	99	+19 Laps
30	LMP3	5	(France) Graff	(Switzerland) Sébastien Page (Switzerland) Luis Sanjuan (France) Eric Trouillet	Nissan VK56DE 5.6 L V8	MI	99	+19 Laps
31	LMP3	16	(United Kingdom) BHK Motorsport	(Italy) Lorenzo Veglia (Lithuania) Gustas Grinbergas (United Kingdom) Nick Adock	Ligier JS P320	MI	96	+22 Laps
31	LMP3	16	(United Kingdom) BHK Motorsport	(Italy) Lorenzo Veglia (Lithuania) Gustas Grinbergas (United Kingdom) Nick Adock	Nissan VK56DE 5.6 L V8	MI	96	+22 Laps
32	LMP2	24	(Portugal) Algarve Pro Racing	(Sweden) Henning Enqvist (United Kingdom) Jon Lancaster (France) Loïc Duval	Oreca 07	G	84	+34 Laps
32	LMP2	24	(Portugal) Algarve Pro Racing	(Sweden) Henning Enqvist (United Kingdom) Jon Lancaster (France) Loïc Duval	Gibson GK428 4.2 L V8	G	84	+34 Laps
33	LMP3	7	(United Kingdom) Nielsen Racing	(United Kingdom) Colin Noble (United Kingdom) Anthony Wells	Duqueine M30 – D08	MI	81	Electrical
33	LMP3	7	(United Kingdom) Nielsen Racing	(United Kingdom) Colin Noble (United Kingdom) Anthony Wells	Nissan VK56DE 5.6 L V8	MI	81	Electrical
34	LMP3	2	(United Kingdom) United Autosports	(United Kingdom) Wayne Boyd (United Kingdom) Tom Gamble (United Kingdom) Robert Wheldon	Ligier JS P320	MI	60	Radiator
34	LMP3	2	(United Kingdom) United Autosports	(United Kingdom) Wayne Boyd (United Kingdom) Tom Gamble (United Kingdom) Robert Wheldon	Nissan VK56DE 5.6 L V8	MI	60	Radiator
35	LMGTE	93	(Germany) Proton Competition	(Republic of Ireland) Michael Fassbender (Germany) Felipe Fernández Laser (Austria) Richard Lietz	Porsche 911 RSR	G	0	Did not start
35	LMGTE	93	(Germany) Proton Competition	(Republic of Ireland) Michael Fassbender (Germany) Felipe Fernández Laser (Austria) Richard Lietz	Porsche 4.0 L Flat-6	G	0	Did not start

European Le Mans Series
Previous race: 4 Hours of Spa-Francorchamps	2020 season	Next race: 4 Hours of Monza
