= 2019 4 Hours of Monza =

Layout of Autodromo Nazionale di Monza, where the race was held.

The 2019 4 Hours of Monza was an endurance sportscar racing event held on May 12, 2019, at Autodromo Nazionale di Monza. It was the second round of the 2019 European Le Mans Series.

== Race ==
=== Race results ===
Class winners are in bold and ‡.

Pos	Class	No	Team	Drivers	Chassis	Tyre	Laps	Time/Retired
Pos	Class	No	Team	Drivers	Engine	Tyre	Laps	Time/Retired
1	**LMP2**	**26**	**(Russia) G-Drive Racing**	**(Russia) Roman Rusinov** **(Netherlands) Job van Uitert** **(France) Norman Nato**	**Aurus 01**	D	**135**	**4:01:40.662‡**
1	**LMP2**	**26**	**(Russia) G-Drive Racing**	**(Russia) Roman Rusinov** **(Netherlands) Job van Uitert** **(France) Norman Nato**	**Gibson GK428 4.2 L V8**	D	**135**	**4:01:40.662‡**
2	LMP2	28	(France) IDEC Sport	(France) Paul-Loup Chatin (France) Paul Lafargue (Mexico) Memo Rojas	Oreca 07	MI	135	+2.135
2	LMP2	28	(France) IDEC Sport	(France) Paul-Loup Chatin (France) Paul Lafargue (Mexico) Memo Rojas	Gibson GK428 4.2 L V8	MI	135	+2.135
3	LMP2	32	(United Kingdom) United Autosports	(United Kingdom) Alex Brundle (Republic of Ireland) Ryan Cullen (United States) William Owen	Ligier JS P217	MI	135	+25.453
3	LMP2	32	(United Kingdom) United Autosports	(United Kingdom) Alex Brundle (Republic of Ireland) Ryan Cullen (United States) William Owen	Gibson GK428 4.2 L V8	MI	135	+25.453
4	LMP2	22	(United Kingdom) United Autosports	(United Kingdom) Phil Hanson (Portugal) Filipe Albuquerque	Ligier JS P217	MI	135	+1:11.396
4	LMP2	22	(United Kingdom) United Autosports	(United Kingdom) Phil Hanson (Portugal) Filipe Albuquerque	Gibson GK428 4.2 L V8	MI	135	+1:11.396
5	LMP2	39	(France) Graff	(France) Alexandre Cougnaud (France) Tristan Gommendy (Switzerland) Jonathan Hirschi	Oreca 07	MI	135	+1:13.434
5	LMP2	39	(France) Graff	(France) Alexandre Cougnaud (France) Tristan Gommendy (Switzerland) Jonathan Hirschi	Gibson GK428 4.2 L V8	MI	135	+1:13.434
6	LMP2	30	(France) Duqueine Engineering	(United Kingdom) Richard Bradley (France) Nico Jamin (France) Pierre Ragues	Oreca 07	MI	134	+1 Lap
6	LMP2	30	(France) Duqueine Engineering	(United Kingdom) Richard Bradley (France) Nico Jamin (France) Pierre Ragues	Gibson GK428 4.2 L V8	MI	134	+1 Lap
7	LMP2	24	(France) Panis Barthez Competition	(France) Timothé Buret (Russia) Konstantin Tereshchenko (Netherlands) Léonard Hoogenboom	Ligier JS P217	D	134	+1 Lap
7	LMP2	24	(France) Panis Barthez Competition	(France) Timothé Buret (Russia) Konstantin Tereshchenko (Netherlands) Léonard Hoogenboom	Gibson GK428 4.2 L V8	D	134	+1 Lap
8	LMP2	37	(Switzerland) Cool Racing	(Switzerland) Antonin Borga (Switzerland) Alexandre Coigny (France) Nicolas Lapierre	Oreca 07	MI	134	+1 Lap
8	LMP2	37	(Switzerland) Cool Racing	(Switzerland) Antonin Borga (Switzerland) Alexandre Coigny (France) Nicolas Lapierre	Gibson GK428 4.2 L V8	MI	134	+1 Lap
9	LMP2	23	(France) Panis Barthez Competition	(Austria) René Binder (France) Julien Canal (United Kingdom) Will Stevens	Ligier JS P217	D	134	+1 Lap
9	LMP2	23	(France) Panis Barthez Competition	(Austria) René Binder (France) Julien Canal (United Kingdom) Will Stevens	Gibson GK428 4.2 L V8	D	134	+1 Lap
10	LMP2	21	(United States) DragonSpeed	(Australia) James Allen (Sweden) Henrik Hedman (Netherlands) Renger van der Zande	Oreca 07	MI	134	+1 Lap
10	LMP2	21	(United States) DragonSpeed	(Australia) James Allen (Sweden) Henrik Hedman (Netherlands) Renger van der Zande	Gibson GK428 4.2 L V8	MI	134	+1 Lap
11	LMP2	45	(United Kingdom) Thunderhead Carlin Racing	(United Kingdom) Ben Barnicoat (United Kingdom) Jack Manchester (United Kingdom) Harry Tincknell	Dallara P217	D	133	+2 Laps
11	LMP2	45	(United Kingdom) Thunderhead Carlin Racing	(United Kingdom) Ben Barnicoat (United Kingdom) Jack Manchester (United Kingdom) Harry Tincknell	Gibson GK428 4.2 L V8	D	133	+2 Laps
12	LMP2	25	(Portugal) Algarve Pro Racing	(United States) John Falb (France) Andrea Pizzitola	Oreca 07	D	133	+2 Laps
12	LMP2	25	(Portugal) Algarve Pro Racing	(United States) John Falb (France) Andrea Pizzitola	Gibson GK428 4.2 L V8	D	133	+2 Laps
13	LMP2	34	(Poland) Inter Europol Competition	(Spain) Dani Clos (France) Léo Roussel (Poland) Jakub Śmiechowski	Ligier JS P217	MI	132	+3 Laps
13	LMP2	34	(Poland) Inter Europol Competition	(Spain) Dani Clos (France) Léo Roussel (Poland) Jakub Śmiechowski	Gibson GK428 4.2 L V8	MI	132	+3 Laps
14	LMP2	31	(Portugal) Algarve Pro Racing	(Sweden) Henning Enqvist (United States) James French (South Korea) Tacksung Kim	Oreca 07	D	131	+4 Laps
14	LMP2	31	(Portugal) Algarve Pro Racing	(Sweden) Henning Enqvist (United States) James French (South Korea) Tacksung Kim	Gibson GK428 4.2 L V8	D	131	+4 Laps
15	LMP2	35	(United Kingdom) BHK Motorsport	(Italy) Sergio Campana (Italy) Francesco Dracone	Oreca 07	D	131	+4 Laps
15	LMP2	35	(United Kingdom) BHK Motorsport	(Italy) Sergio Campana (Italy) Francesco Dracone	Gibson GK428 4.2 L V8	D	131	+4 Laps
16	LMP2	27	(France) IDEC Sport	(France) Stéphane Adler (France) Erik Maris (France) Patrice Lafargue	Ligier JS P217	MI	128	+7 Laps
16	LMP2	27	(France) IDEC Sport	(France) Stéphane Adler (France) Erik Maris (France) Patrice Lafargue	Gibson GK428 4.2 L V8	MI	128	+7 Laps
17	LMP2	20	(Denmark) High Class Racing	(Denmark) Dennis Andersen (Denmark) Anders Fjordbach	Oreca 07	D	125	+10 Laps
17	LMP2	20	(Denmark) High Class Racing	(Denmark) Dennis Andersen (Denmark) Anders Fjordbach	Gibson GK428 4.2 L V8	D	125	+10 Laps
18	**LMP3**	**11**	**(United States) Eurointernational**	**(Denmark) Mikkel Jensen** **(Germany) Jens Petersen**	**Ligier JS P3**	MI	**125**	**+10 Laps‡**
18	**LMP3**	**11**	**(United States) Eurointernational**	**(Denmark) Mikkel Jensen** **(Germany) Jens Petersen**	**Nissan VK50VE 5.0 L V8**	MI	**125**	**+10 Laps‡**
19	LMP3	13	(Poland) Inter Europol Competition	(Germany) Martin Hippe (United Kingdom) Nigel Moore	Ligier JS P3	MI	125	+10 Laps
19	LMP3	13	(Poland) Inter Europol Competition	(Germany) Martin Hippe (United Kingdom) Nigel Moore	Nissan VK50VE 5.0 L V8	MI	125	+10 Laps
20	LMP3	2	(United Kingdom) United Autosports	(United Kingdom) Wayne Boyd (Brazil) Tommy Erdos (Canada) Garett Grist	Ligier JS P3	MI	125	+10 Laps
20	LMP3	2	(United Kingdom) United Autosports	(United Kingdom) Wayne Boyd (Brazil) Tommy Erdos (Canada) Garett Grist	Nissan VK50VE 5.0 L V8	MI	125	+10 Laps
21	LMP3	9	(Switzerland) Realteam Racing	(Switzerland) David Droux (Switzerland) Esteban García	Norma M30	MI	124	+11 Laps
21	LMP3	9	(Switzerland) Realteam Racing	(Switzerland) David Droux (Switzerland) Esteban García	Nissan VK50VE 5.0 L V8	MI	124	+11 Laps
22	LMP3	19	(France) M Racing	(Switzerland) Lucas Légeret (France) Laurent Millara	Norma M30	MI	124	+11 Laps
22	LMP3	19	(France) M Racing	(Switzerland) Lucas Légeret (France) Laurent Millara	Nissan VK50VE 5.0 L V8	MI	124	+11 Laps
23	LMP3	6	(United Kingdom) 360 Racing	(Canada) James Dayson (United Kingdom) Ross Kaiser (United Kingdom) Terrence Woodward	Ligier JS P3	MI	124	+11 Laps
23	LMP3	6	(United Kingdom) 360 Racing	(Canada) James Dayson (United Kingdom) Ross Kaiser (United Kingdom) Terrence Woodward	Nissan VK50VE 5.0 L V8	MI	124	+11 Laps
24	LMP3	7	(United Kingdom) Nielsen Racing	(United Kingdom) Colin Noble (United Kingdom) Anthony Wells	Norma M30	MI	124	+11 Laps
24	LMP3	7	(United Kingdom) Nielsen Racing	(United Kingdom) Colin Noble (United Kingdom) Anthony Wells	Nissan VK50VE 5.0 L V8	MI	124	+11 Laps
25	**LMGTE**	**77**	**(Germany) Dempsey-Proton Racing**	**(Italy) Matteo Cairoli** **(Italy) Riccardo Pera** **(Germany) Christian Ried**	**Porsche 911 RSR**	D	**123**	**+12 Laps‡**
25	**LMGTE**	**77**	**(Germany) Dempsey-Proton Racing**	**(Italy) Matteo Cairoli** **(Italy) Riccardo Pera** **(Germany) Christian Ried**	**Porsche 4.0 L Flat-6**	D	**123**	**+12 Laps‡**
26	LMP3	5	(United Kingdom) 360 Racing	(Australia) John Corbett (Greece) Andreas Laskaratos (United Kingdom) James Winslow	Ligier JS P3	MI	123	+12 Laps
26	LMP3	5	(United Kingdom) 360 Racing	(Australia) John Corbett (Greece) Andreas Laskaratos (United Kingdom) James Winslow	Nissan VK50VE 5.0 L V8	MI	123	+12 Laps
27	LMGTE	66	(United Kingdom) JMW Motorsport	(Italy) Matteo Cressoni (Canada) Wei Lu (United States) Jeff Segal	Ferrari 488 GTE	D	123	+12 Laps
27	LMGTE	66	(United Kingdom) JMW Motorsport	(Italy) Matteo Cressoni (Canada) Wei Lu (United States) Jeff Segal	Ferrari F154CB 3.9 L Turbo V8	D	123	+12 Laps
28	LMP3	14	(Poland) Inter Europol Competition	(Germany) Paul Scheuschner (Belgium) Sam Dejonghe	Ligier JS P3	MI	123	+12 Laps
28	LMP3	14	(Poland) Inter Europol Competition	(Germany) Paul Scheuschner (Belgium) Sam Dejonghe	Nissan VK50VE 5.0 L V8	MI	123	+12 Laps
29	LMGTE	51	(United States) Luzich Racing	(France) Fabien Lavergne (Denmark) Nicklas Nielsen (Italy) Alessandro Pier Guidi	Ferrari 488 GTE	D	123	+12 Laps
29	LMGTE	51	(United States) Luzich Racing	(France) Fabien Lavergne (Denmark) Nicklas Nielsen (Italy) Alessandro Pier Guidi	Ferrari F154CB 3.9 L Turbo V8	D	123	+12 Laps
30	LMGTE	56	(Germany) Team Project 1	(Germany) Jörg Bergmeister (Norway) Egidio Perfetti (Italy) Giorgio Roda	Porsche 911 RSR	D	123	+12 Laps
30	LMGTE	56	(Germany) Team Project 1	(Germany) Jörg Bergmeister (Norway) Egidio Perfetti (Italy) Giorgio Roda	Porsche 4.0 L Flat-6	D	123	+12 Laps
31	LMGTE	80	(Italy) EbiMotors	(Italy) Fabio Babini (Italy) Marco Frezza (Italy) Sébastien Fortuna	Porsche 911 RSR	D	122	+13 Laps
31	LMGTE	80	(Italy) EbiMotors	(Italy) Fabio Babini (Italy) Marco Frezza (Italy) Sébastien Fortuna	Porsche 4.0 L Flat-6	D	122	+13 Laps
32	LMGTE	83	(Switzerland) Kessel Racing	(Switzerland) Rahel Frey (Denmark) Michelle Gatting (Italy) Manuela Gostner	Ferrari 488 GTE	D	122	+13 Laps
32	LMGTE	83	(Switzerland) Kessel Racing	(Switzerland) Rahel Frey (Denmark) Michelle Gatting (Italy) Manuela Gostner	Ferrari F154CB 3.9 L Turbo V8	D	122	+13 Laps
33	LMGTE	55	(Switzerland) Spirit of Race	(United Kingdom) Duncan Cameron (Republic of Ireland) Matt Griffin (United Kingdom) Aaron Scott	Ferrari 488 GTE	D	122	+13 Laps
33	LMGTE	55	(Switzerland) Spirit of Race	(United Kingdom) Duncan Cameron (Republic of Ireland) Matt Griffin (United Kingdom) Aaron Scott	Ferrari F154CB 3.9 L Turbo V8	D	122	+13 Laps
34	LMP3	3	(United Kingdom) United Autosports	(United Kingdom) Christian England (United States) Michael Guasch	Ligier JS P3	MI	102	+33 Laps
34	LMP3	3	(United Kingdom) United Autosports	(United Kingdom) Christian England (United States) Michael Guasch	Nissan VK50VE 5.0 L V8	MI	102	+33 Laps
35	LMP2	43	(United Kingdom) RLR MSport	(Canada) John Farano (India) Arjun Maini (Brazil) Bruno Senna	Oreca 07	D	129	Did not finish
35	LMP2	43	(United Kingdom) RLR MSport	(Canada) John Farano (India) Arjun Maini (Brazil) Bruno Senna	Gibson GK428 4.2 L V8	D	129	Did not finish
36	LMP3	17	(France) Ultimate	(France) François Heriau (France) Jean-Baptiste Lahaye (France) Matthieu Lahaye	Norma M30	MI	110	Accident
36	LMP3	17	(France) Ultimate	(France) François Heriau (France) Jean-Baptiste Lahaye (France) Matthieu Lahaye	Nissan VK50VE 5.0 L V8	MI	110	Accident
37	LMGTE	60	(Switzerland) Kessel Racing	(Italy) Sergio Pianezzola (Italy) Andrea Piccini (Italy) Claudio Schiavoni	Ferrari 488 GTE	D	105	Did not finish
37	LMGTE	60	(Switzerland) Kessel Racing	(Italy) Sergio Pianezzola (Italy) Andrea Piccini (Italy) Claudio Schiavoni	Ferrari F154CB 3.9 L Turbo V8	D	105	Did not finish
38	LMP3	10	(Italy) Oregon Team	(Italy) Lorenzo Bontempelli (Italy) Damiano Fioravanti (Lithuania) Gustas Grinbergas	Norma M30	MI	85	Fire
38	LMP3	10	(Italy) Oregon Team	(Italy) Lorenzo Bontempelli (Italy) Damiano Fioravanti (Lithuania) Gustas Grinbergas	Nissan VK50VE 5.0 L V8	MI	85	Fire
39	LMP3	8	(United Kingdom) Nielsen Racing	(United Kingdom) James Littlejohn (Japan) Nobuya Yamanaka	Ligier JS P3	MI	41	Accident
39	LMP3	8	(United Kingdom) Nielsen Racing	(United Kingdom) James Littlejohn (Japan) Nobuya Yamanaka	Nissan VK50VE 5.0 L V8	MI	41	Accident
40	LMP2	47	(Italy) Cetilar Racing Villorba Corse	(Italy) Andrea Belicchi (Italy) Roberto Lacorte (Italy) Giorgio Sernagiotto	Dallara P217	MI	35	Did not finish
40	LMP2	47	(Italy) Cetilar Racing Villorba Corse	(Italy) Andrea Belicchi (Italy) Roberto Lacorte (Italy) Giorgio Sernagiotto	Gibson GK428 4.2 L V8	MI	35	Did not finish
41	LMP3	15	(United Kingdom) RLR MSport	(Denmark) Christian Stubbe Olsen (United Kingdom) Martin Rich (Denmark) Martin Vedel Mortensen	Ligier JS P3	MI	26	Did not finish
41	LMP3	15	(United Kingdom) RLR MSport	(Denmark) Christian Stubbe Olsen (United Kingdom) Martin Rich (Denmark) Martin Vedel Mortensen	Nissan VK50VE 5.0 L V8	MI	26	Did not finish

European Le Mans Series
Previous race: Le Castellet	2019 season	Next race: Barcelona
