= 2019 European Le Mans Series =

Racing

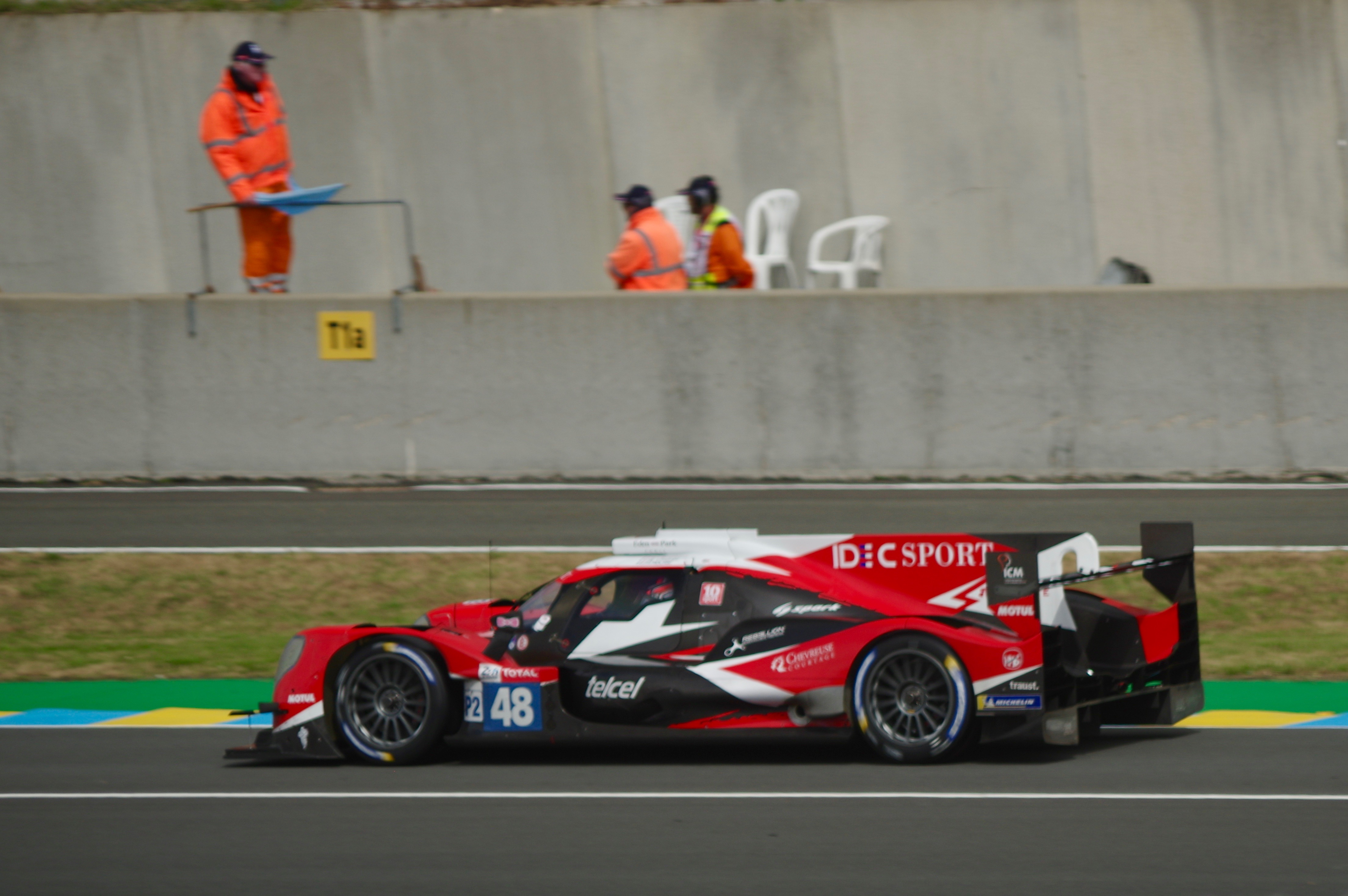
IDEC Sport No. 28 Oreca 07, winner of the 2019 European Le Mans Series in the LMP2 class

The 2019 European Le Mans Series was the sixteenth season of the Automobile Club de l'Ouest's (ACO) European Le Mans Series. The six-event season began at Circuit Paul Ricard on 14 April and finished at Algarve International Circuit on 27 October.

The series was open to Le Mans Prototypes, divided into the LMP2 and LMP3 classes, and grand tourer-style racing cars in the LMGTE class.

== Calendar ==
The provisional calendar for the 2019 season was announced on 21 September 2018. The calendar comprises six events, with the only change from the 2018 season being the addition of a race at Circuit de Barcelona-Catalunya, which replaces the Red Bull Ring as the third round of the season.

In April 2019, it was announced that the round in Barcelona would be held as an evening race, taking place on the Saturday evening of the event instead of the originally scheduled Sunday afternoon, primarily due to the anticipated hot weather in Spain in July.

The round at Silverstone is once again held in conjunction with the FIA World Endurance Championship.

Rnd	Race	Circuit	Location	Date
1	4 Hours of Le Castellet	(France) Circuit Paul Ricard	Le Castellet, France	14 April
2	4 Hours of Monza	(Italy) Autodromo Nazionale di Monza	Monza, Italy	12 May
3	4 Hours of Barcelona	(Spain) Circuit de Barcelona-Catalunya	Montmeló, Spain	20 July
4	4 Hours of Silverstone	(United Kingdom) Silverstone Circuit	Silverstone, United Kingdom	31 August
5	4 Hours of Spa	(Belgium) Circuit de Spa-Francorchamps	Spa, Belgium	22 September
6	4 Hours of Portimão	(Portugal) Algarve International Circuit	Portimão, Portugal	27 October

== Entries ==
=== LMP2 ===
In accordance with the 2017 LMP2 regulations, all cars in the LMP2 class used the Gibson GK428 V8 engine.

Entrant/Team	Chassis	Tyre	No.	Drivers	Rounds
(Denmark) High Class Racing	Oreca 07	D	20	(Denmark) Dennis Andersen	All
(Denmark) High Class Racing	Oreca 07	D	20	(Denmark) Anders Fjordbach	All
(United States) DragonSpeed	Oreca 07	M	21	(Australia) James Allen	All
(United States) DragonSpeed	Oreca 07	M	21	(Sweden) Henrik Hedman	All
(United States) DragonSpeed	Oreca 07	M	21	(United Kingdom) Ben Hanley	1, 3–6
(United States) DragonSpeed	Oreca 07	M	21	(Netherlands) Renger van der Zande	2
(United Kingdom) United Autosports	Ligier JS P217; Oreca 07 (Note: United Autosport No. 22 car switched to the Oreca 07 from the Silverstone Round onward, while the No. 32 car switched from the Spa-Francorchamps Round onward.)	M	22	(United Kingdom) Phil Hanson	All
(United Kingdom) United Autosports	Ligier JS P217; Oreca 07	M	22	(United Kingdom) Paul di Resta	1
(United Kingdom) United Autosports	Ligier JS P217; Oreca 07	M	22	(Portugal) Filipe Albuquerque	2–6
(United Kingdom) United Autosports	Ligier JS P217; Oreca 07	M	32	(United Kingdom) Alex Brundle	All
(United Kingdom) United Autosports	Ligier JS P217; Oreca 07	M	32	(Republic of Ireland) Ryan Cullen	All
(United Kingdom) United Autosports	Ligier JS P217; Oreca 07	M	32	(United States) William Owen	2–6
(France) Panis Barthez Competition	Ligier JS P217; Oreca 07 (Note: Panis Barthez No. 23 car entered with Oreca 07 from the Silverstone Round onward.)	D	23	(Austria) René Binder	All
(France) Panis Barthez Competition	Ligier JS P217; Oreca 07	D	23	(France) Julien Canal	All
(France) Panis Barthez Competition	Ligier JS P217; Oreca 07	D	23	(United Kingdom) Will Stevens	All
(France) Panis Barthez Competition	Ligier JS P217; Oreca 07	D	24	(France) Timothé Buret	All
(France) Panis Barthez Competition	Ligier JS P217; Oreca 07	D	24	(Russia) Konstantin Tereshchenko	All
(France) Panis Barthez Competition	Ligier JS P217; Oreca 07	D	24	(Netherlands) Leonard Hoogenboom	1–3
(Portugal) Algarve Pro Racing	Oreca 07	D	25	(United States) John Falb	All
(Portugal) Algarve Pro Racing	Oreca 07	D	25	(France) Andrea Pizzitola	All
(Portugal) Algarve Pro Racing	Oreca 07	D	25	(United States) Mark Patterson	1
(Portugal) Algarve Pro Racing	Oreca 07	D	25	(France) Olivier Pla	3–6
(Portugal) Algarve Pro Racing	Oreca 07	D	31	(Sweden) Henning Enqvist	All
(Portugal) Algarve Pro Racing	Oreca 07	D	31	(United States) James French	All
(Portugal) Algarve Pro Racing	Oreca 07	D	31	(South Korea) Tacksung Kim	All
(Russia) G-Drive Racing	Aurus 01	D	26	(Russia) Roman Rusinov	All
(Russia) G-Drive Racing	Aurus 01	D	26	(Netherlands) Job van Uitert	All
(Russia) G-Drive Racing	Aurus 01	D	26	(France) Norman Nato	1–2
(Russia) G-Drive Racing	Aurus 01	D	26	(France) Jean-Éric Vergne	3–6
(France) IDEC Sport	Ligier JS P217	M	27	(France) Stéphane Adler	All
(France) IDEC Sport	Ligier JS P217	M	27	(France) Erik Maris	1–2, 5
(France) IDEC Sport	Ligier JS P217	M	27	(France) Patrice Lafargue	1–2, 4, 6
(France) IDEC Sport	Ligier JS P217	M	27	(France) Nicolas Minassian	3
(France) IDEC Sport	Ligier JS P217	M	27	(France) William Cavailhes	3–6
(France) IDEC Sport	Oreca 07	M	28	(France) Paul-Loup Chatin	All
(France) IDEC Sport	Oreca 07	M	28	(France) Paul Lafargue	All
(France) IDEC Sport	Oreca 07	M	28	(Mexico) Memo Rojas	All
(France) Duqueine Engineering	Oreca 07	M	30	(United Kingdom) Richard Bradley	All
(France) Duqueine Engineering	Oreca 07	M	30	(France) Nico Jamin	All
(France) Duqueine Engineering	Oreca 07	M	30	(France) Pierre Ragues	All
(Poland) Inter Europol Competition	Ligier JS P217	M	34	(Spain) Dani Clos	1–3
(Poland) Inter Europol Competition	Ligier JS P217	M	34	(France) Léo Roussel (Note: Roussel crashed during the second free practice session for the 4 Hours of Monza and subsequently missed the race due to the injuries he sustained.)	1–2
(Poland) Inter Europol Competition	Ligier JS P217	M	34	(Poland) Jakub Śmiechowski	All
(Poland) Inter Europol Competition	Ligier JS P217	M	34	(France) Adrien Tambay	3–4
(Poland) Inter Europol Competition	Ligier JS P217	M	34	(Austria) Lukas Dunner	4
(Poland) Inter Europol Competition	Ligier JS P217	M	34	(Belgium) Sam Dejonghe	5–6
(Poland) Inter Europol Competition	Ligier JS P217	M	34	(Switzerland) Mathias Beche	5–6
(United Kingdom) BHK Motorsport	Oreca 07	D	35	(Italy) Sergio Campana	All
(United Kingdom) BHK Motorsport	Oreca 07	D	35	(Italy) Francesco Dracone	All
(United Kingdom) BHK Motorsport	Oreca 07	D	35	(United Kingdom) Garry Findlay	3–4
(Switzerland) Cool Racing	Oreca 07	M	37	(Switzerland) Antonin Borga	All
(Switzerland) Cool Racing	Oreca 07	M	37	(Switzerland) Alexandre Coigny	1–4, 6
(Switzerland) Cool Racing	Oreca 07	M	37	(France) Nicolas Lapierre	All
(France) Graff	Oreca 07	M	39	(France) Alexandre Cougnaud	All
(France) Graff	Oreca 07	M	39	(France) Tristan Gommendy	All
(France) Graff	Oreca 07	M	39	(Switzerland) Jonathan Hirschi	All
(United Kingdom) RLR MSport	Oreca 07	D	43	(Canada) John Farano	All
(United Kingdom) RLR MSport	Oreca 07	D	43	(India) Arjun Maini	All
(United Kingdom) RLR MSport	Oreca 07	D	43	(Brazil) Bruno Senna	1–3, 5–6
(United Kingdom) RLR MSport	Oreca 07	D	43	(France) Matthieu Vaxiviere	4
(United Kingdom) Thunderhead Carlin Racing	Dallara P217	D	45	(United Kingdom) Ben Barnicoat	1–4, 6
(United Kingdom) Thunderhead Carlin Racing	Dallara P217	D	45	(United Kingdom) Jack Manchester	1–3, 6
(United Kingdom) Thunderhead Carlin Racing	Dallara P217	D	45	(France) Olivier Pla	1
(United Kingdom) Thunderhead Carlin Racing	Dallara P217	D	45	(United Kingdom) Harry Tincknell	2–4, 6
(United Kingdom) Thunderhead Carlin Racing	Dallara P217	D	45	(United Kingdom) Harrison Newey	4
(Italy) Cetilar Racing Villorba Corse	Dallara P217	M	47	(Italy) Andrea Belicchi	2
(Italy) Cetilar Racing Villorba Corse	Dallara P217	M	47	(Italy) Roberto Lacorte	2
(Italy) Cetilar Racing Villorba Corse	Dallara P217	M	47	(Italy) Giorgio Sernagiotto	2

=== LMP3 ===
All cars in the LMP3 class used the Nissan VK50VE 5.0 L V8 engine and Michelin tyres.

Entrant/Team	Chassis	No.	Drivers	Rounds
(United Kingdom) United Autosports	Ligier JS P3	2	(United Kingdom) Wayne Boyd	All
(United Kingdom) United Autosports	Ligier JS P3	2	(Brazil) Tommy Erdos	All
(United Kingdom) United Autosports	Ligier JS P3	2	(Canada) Garett Grist	All
(United Kingdom) United Autosports	Ligier JS P3	3	(United Kingdom) Christian England	All
(United Kingdom) United Autosports	Ligier JS P3	3	(United States) Michael Guasch	1–4
(United Kingdom) United Autosports	Ligier JS P3	3	(United Kingdom) Andrew Bentley	5–6
(United Kingdom) 360 Racing	Ligier JS P3	5	(Australia) John Corbett	1–5
(United Kingdom) 360 Racing	Ligier JS P3	5	(Greece) Andreas Laskaratos	1–5
(United Kingdom) 360 Racing	Ligier JS P3	5	(United Kingdom) James Winslow	1–5
(United Kingdom) 360 Racing	Ligier JS P3	6	(Canada) James Dayson	All
(United Kingdom) 360 Racing	Ligier JS P3	6	(United Kingdom) Ross Kaiser	All
(United Kingdom) 360 Racing	Ligier JS P3	6	(United Kingdom) Terrence Woodward	All
(United Kingdom) Nielsen Racing	Norma M30	7	(United Kingdom) Colin Noble	All
(United Kingdom) Nielsen Racing	Norma M30	7	(United Kingdom) Anthony Wells	All
(United Kingdom) Nielsen Racing	Ligier JS P3	8	(United Kingdom) James Littlejohn	All
(United Kingdom) Nielsen Racing	Ligier JS P3	8	(Japan) Nobuya Yamanaka	1–2, 4
(United Kingdom) Nielsen Racing	Ligier JS P3	8	(United Kingdom) Nicholas Adcock	3, 5–6
(Switzerland) Realteam Racing	Norma M30	9	(Switzerland) David Droux	All
(Switzerland) Realteam Racing	Norma M30	9	(Switzerland) Esteban García	All
(Italy) Oregon Team	Norma M30	10	(Italy) Lorenzo Bontempelli	All
(Italy) Oregon Team	Norma M30	10	(Italy) Damiano Fioravanti	All
(Italy) Oregon Team	Norma M30	10	(Lithuania) Gustas Grinbergas	All
(United States) Eurointernational	Ligier JS P3	11	(Denmark) Mikkel Jensen	All
(United States) Eurointernational	Ligier JS P3	11	(Germany) Jens Petersen	All
(Poland) Inter Europol Competition	Ligier JS P3	13	(Germany) Martin Hippe	All
(Poland) Inter Europol Competition	Ligier JS P3	13	(United Kingdom) Nigel Moore	All
(Poland) Inter Europol Competition	Ligier JS P3	14	(Germany) Paul Scheuschner	All
(Poland) Inter Europol Competition	Ligier JS P3	14	(France) Dino Lunardi	1
(Poland) Inter Europol Competition	Ligier JS P3	14	(Belgium) Sam Dejonghe	2–4
(Poland) Inter Europol Competition	Ligier JS P3	14	(Austria) Constantin Schöll	5–6
(United Kingdom) RLR MSport	Ligier JS P3	15	(Denmark) Christian Stubbe Olsen	All
(United Kingdom) RLR MSport	Ligier JS P3	15	(United Kingdom) Martin Rich	All
(United Kingdom) RLR MSport	Ligier JS P3	15	(Denmark) Martin Vedel Mortensen	All
(France) Ultimate	Norma M30	17	(France) François Hériau	All
(France) Ultimate	Norma M30	17	(France) Jean-Baptiste Lahaye	All
(France) Ultimate	Norma M30	17	(France) Matthieu Lahaye	All
(Italy) ACE1 Villorba Corse	Ligier JS P3	18	(Italy) Alessandro Bressan	3
(Italy) ACE1 Villorba Corse	Ligier JS P3	18	(Italy) Gabriele Lancieri	3
(Italy) ACE1 Villorba Corse	Ligier JS P3	18	(Japan) Yuki Harata	3
(France) M Racing	Norma M30	19	(Switzerland) Lucas Légeret	All
(France) M Racing	Norma M30	19	(France) Laurent Millara	All
(France) M Racing	Norma M30	19	(France) Yann Ehrlacher	1, 3–4

=== LMGTE ===
All cars in the LMGTE class used Dunlop Tyres.

Entrant/Team	Chassis	Engine	No.	Drivers	Rounds
(United States) Luzich Racing	Ferrari 488 GTE 1–2; Ferrari 488 GTE Evo 3–6	Ferrari F154CB 4.0 L Turbo V8	51	(France) Fabien Lavergne	All
(United States) Luzich Racing	Ferrari 488 GTE 1–2; Ferrari 488 GTE Evo 3–6	Ferrari F154CB 4.0 L Turbo V8	51	(Denmark) Nicklas Nielsen	All
(United States) Luzich Racing	Ferrari 488 GTE 1–2; Ferrari 488 GTE Evo 3–6	Ferrari F154CB 4.0 L Turbo V8	51	(Italy) Alessandro Pier Guidi	All
(Switzerland) Spirit of Race	Ferrari 488 GTE 1–2; Ferrari 488 GTE Evo 3–6	Ferrari F154CB 4.0 L Turbo V8	55	(United Kingdom) Duncan Cameron	All
(Switzerland) Spirit of Race	Ferrari 488 GTE 1–2; Ferrari 488 GTE Evo 3–6	Ferrari F154CB 4.0 L Turbo V8	55	(Republic of Ireland) Matt Griffin	All
(Switzerland) Spirit of Race	Ferrari 488 GTE 1–2; Ferrari 488 GTE Evo 3–6	Ferrari F154CB 4.0 L Turbo V8	55	(United Kingdom) Aaron Scott	All
(Germany) Team Project 1	Porsche 911 RSR	Porsche M97/80 4.0 L Flat-6	56	(Germany) Jörg Bergmeister	1–3
(Germany) Team Project 1	Porsche 911 RSR	Porsche M97/80 4.0 L Flat-6	56	(Norway) Egidio Perfetti	1–3
(Germany) Team Project 1	Porsche 911 RSR	Porsche M97/80 4.0 L Flat-6	56	(Italy) Giorgio Roda	1–2
(Germany) Team Project 1	Porsche 911 RSR	Porsche M97/80 4.0 L Flat-6	56	(Denmark) David Heinemeier Hansson	3
(Switzerland) Kessel Racing	Ferrari 488 GTE 1–2; Ferrari 488 GTE Evo 3–6	Ferrari F154CB 4.0 L Turbo V8	60	(Italy) Sergio Pianezzola	All
(Switzerland) Kessel Racing	Ferrari 488 GTE 1–2; Ferrari 488 GTE Evo 3–6	Ferrari F154CB 4.0 L Turbo V8	60	(Italy) Andrea Piccini	1–3, 5–6
(Switzerland) Kessel Racing	Ferrari 488 GTE 1–2; Ferrari 488 GTE Evo 3–6	Ferrari F154CB 4.0 L Turbo V8	60	(Italy) Claudio Schiavoni	1–3
(Switzerland) Kessel Racing	Ferrari 488 GTE 1–2; Ferrari 488 GTE Evo 3–6	Ferrari F154CB 4.0 L Turbo V8	60	(Italy) Nicola Cadei	4
(Switzerland) Kessel Racing	Ferrari 488 GTE 1–2; Ferrari 488 GTE Evo 3–6	Ferrari F154CB 4.0 L Turbo V8	60	(Italy) Giacomo Piccini	4
(Switzerland) Kessel Racing	Ferrari 488 GTE 1–2; Ferrari 488 GTE Evo 3–6	Ferrari F154CB 4.0 L Turbo V8	60	(South Africa) David Perel	5–6
(Switzerland) Kessel Racing	Ferrari 488 GTE 1–2; Ferrari 488 GTE Evo 3–6	Ferrari F154CB 4.0 L Turbo V8	83	(Switzerland) Rahel Frey	All
(Switzerland) Kessel Racing	Ferrari 488 GTE 1–2; Ferrari 488 GTE Evo 3–6	Ferrari F154CB 4.0 L Turbo V8	83	(Denmark) Michelle Gatting	All
(Switzerland) Kessel Racing	Ferrari 488 GTE 1–2; Ferrari 488 GTE Evo 3–6	Ferrari F154CB 4.0 L Turbo V8	83	(Italy) Manuela Gostner	All
(United Kingdom) JMW Motorsport	Ferrari 488 GTE 1–2; Ferrari 488 GTE Evo 3–6	Ferrari F154CB 4.0 L Turbo V8	66	(Italy) Matteo Cressoni	All
(United Kingdom) JMW Motorsport	Ferrari 488 GTE 1–2; Ferrari 488 GTE Evo 3–6	Ferrari F154CB 4.0 L Turbo V8	66	(Canada) Wei Lu	All
(United Kingdom) JMW Motorsport	Ferrari 488 GTE 1–2; Ferrari 488 GTE Evo 3–6	Ferrari F154CB 4.0 L Turbo V8	66	(United States) Jeff Segal	All
(Germany) Dempsey-Proton Racing	Porsche 911 RSR	Porsche M97/80 4.0 L Flat-6	77	(Italy) Matteo Cairoli	All
(Germany) Dempsey-Proton Racing	Porsche 911 RSR	Porsche M97/80 4.0 L Flat-6	77	(Italy) Riccardo Pera	All
(Germany) Dempsey-Proton Racing	Porsche 911 RSR	Porsche M97/80 4.0 L Flat-6	77	(Germany) Christian Ried	All
(Italy) EbiMotors	Porsche 911 RSR	Porsche M97/80 4.0 L Flat-6	80	(Italy) Fabio Babini	1–3, 6
(Italy) EbiMotors	Porsche 911 RSR	Porsche M97/80 4.0 L Flat-6	80	(Italy) Marco Frezza	1–3, 6
(Italy) EbiMotors	Porsche 911 RSR	Porsche M97/80 4.0 L Flat-6	80	(Italy) Sébastien Fortuna	1–2
(Italy) EbiMotors	Porsche 911 RSR	Porsche M97/80 4.0 L Flat-6	80	(Germany) Edward-Lewis Brauner	3
(Italy) EbiMotors	Porsche 911 RSR	Porsche M97/80 4.0 L Flat-6	80	(Italy) Gianluca Giraudi	6
(Germany) Proton Competition	Porsche 911 RSR	Porsche M97/80 4.0 L Flat-6	88	(Austria) Thomas Preining	1, 4, 6
(Germany) Proton Competition	Porsche 911 RSR	Porsche M97/80 4.0 L Flat-6	88	(Austria) Horst Felbermayr Jr.	1
(Germany) Proton Competition	Porsche 911 RSR	Porsche M97/80 4.0 L Flat-6	88	(Germany) Marco Seefried	1
(Germany) Proton Competition	Porsche 911 RSR	Porsche M97/80 4.0 L Flat-6	88	(Italy) Gianluca Giraudi	4
(Germany) Proton Competition	Porsche 911 RSR	Porsche M97/80 4.0 L Flat-6	88	(Mexico) Ricardo Sanchez	4
(Germany) Proton Competition	Porsche 911 RSR	Porsche M97/80 4.0 L Flat-6	88	(Belgium) Adrien De Leener	6
(Germany) Proton Competition	Porsche 911 RSR	Porsche M97/80 4.0 L Flat-6	88	(Germany) Steffen Görig	6

== Results ==
Bold indicates overall winner.

Rnd.	Circuit	LMP2 Winning Team	LMP3 Winning Team	LMGTE Winning Team	Results
Rnd.	Circuit	LMP2 Winning Drivers	LMP3 Winning Drivers	LMGTE Winning Drivers	Results
1	(France) Le Castellet	**(United States) No. 21 DragonSpeed**	(France) No. 17 Ultimate	(United States) No. 51 Luzich Racing	Report
1	(France) Le Castellet	**(Australia) James Allen** **(United Kingdom) Ben Hanley** **(Sweden) Henrik Hedman**	(France) François Hériau (France) Jean-Baptiste Lahaye (France) Matthieu Lahaye	(France) Fabien Lavergne (Denmark) Nicklas Nielsen (Italy) Alessandro Pier Guidi	Report
2	(Italy) Monza	**(Russia) No. 26 G-Drive Racing**	(United States) No. 11 Eurointernational	(Germany) No. 77 Dempsey-Proton Racing	Report
2	(Italy) Monza	**(France) Norman Nato** **(Russia) Roman Rusinov** **(Netherlands) Job van Uitert**	(Denmark) Mikkel Jensen (Germany) Jens Petersen	(Italy) Matteo Cairoli (Italy) Riccardo Pera (Germany) Christian Ried	Report
3	(Spain) Barcelona	**(Russia) No. 26 G-Drive Racing**	(Poland) No. 13 Inter Europol Competition	(United States) No. 51 Luzich Racing	Report
3	(Spain) Barcelona	**(Russia) Roman Rusinov** **(Netherlands) Job van Uitert** **(France) Jean-Éric Vergne**	(Germany) Martin Hippe (United Kingdom) Nigel Moore	(France) Fabien Lavergne (Denmark) Nicklas Nielsen (Italy) Alessandro Pier Guidi	Report
4	(United Kingdom) Silverstone	**(France) No. 28 IDEC Sport**	(United States) No. 11 Eurointernational	(Germany) No. 88 Proton Competition	Report
4	(United Kingdom) Silverstone	**(France) Paul-Loup Chatin** **(France) Paul Lafargue** **(Mexico) Memo Rojas**	(Denmark) Mikkel Jensen (Germany) Jens Petersen	(Italy) Gianluca Giraudi (Austria) Thomas Preining (Mexico) Ricardo Sanchez	Report
5	(Belgium) Spa-Francorchamps	(United Kingdom) **No. 22 United Autosports**	(United States) No. 11 Eurointernational	(United States) No. 51 Luzich Racing	Report
5	(Belgium) Spa-Francorchamps	**(Portugal) Filipe Albuquerque** **(United Kingdom) Phil Hanson**	(Denmark) Mikkel Jensen (Germany) Jens Petersen	(France) Fabien Lavergne (Denmark) Nicklas Nielsen (Italy) Alessandro Pier Guidi	Report
6	(Portugal) Portimão	**(France) No. 28 IDEC Sport**	(United Kingdom) No. 6 360 Racing	(United States) No. 51 Luzich Racing	Report
6	(Portugal) Portimão	**(France) Paul-Loup Chatin** **(France) Paul Lafargue** **(Mexico) Memo Rojas**	(Canada) James Dayson (United Kingdom) Ross Kaiser (United Kingdom) Terrence Woodward	(France) Fabien Lavergne (Denmark) Nicklas Nielsen (Italy) Alessandro Pier Guidi	Report

To be classified a car will have to cross the finish line on the race track when the chequered flag is shown, except in a case of force majeure at the Stewards’ discretion and have covered at least 70% (the official number of laps will be rounded down to the nearest whole number) of the distance covered by the car classified in first place in the overall classification.

== Teams Championships ==
Points are awarded according to the following structure:

Position	**1st**	**2nd**	**3rd**	**4th**	**5th**	**6th**	**7th**	**8th**	**9th**	**10th**	**Other**	**Pole**
Points	25	18	15	12	10	8	6	4	2	1	0.5	1

=== LMP2 Teams Championship ===
Pos.	Team	Car	LEC (France)	MNZ (Italy)	BAR (Spain)	SIL (United Kingdom)	SPA (Belgium)	POR (Portugal)	Points
1	(France) #28 IDEC Sport	Oreca 07	2	2	**5**	1	6	1	105
2	(Russia) #26 G-Drive Racing	Aurus 01	**4**	1	1	2	4	6	101
3	(France) #39 Graff	Oreca 07	5	5	2	3	3	3	83
4	(United Kingdom) #22 United Autosports	Ligier JS P217	6	4	7				71
4	(United Kingdom) #22 United Autosports	Oreca 07				Ret	**1**	**2**	71
5	(United States) #21 DragonSpeed	Oreca 07	1	10	10	**4**	7	9	48
6	(France) #30 Duqueine Engineering	Oreca 07	3	6	4	Ret	5	Ret	45
7	(Switzerland) #37 Cool Racing	Oreca 07	7	**8**	3	Ret	2	14	44.5
8	(United Kingdom) #32 United Autosports	Ligier JS P217	12	3	8	8			37.5
8	(United Kingdom) #32 United Autosports	Oreca 07					9	4	37.5
9	(Portugal) #25 Algarve Pro Racing	Oreca 07	14	12	6	6	10	5	28
10	(France) #24 Panis Barthez Competition	Ligier JS P217	Ret	7	Ret	5	Ret	8	20
11	(France) #23 Panis Barthez Competition	Ligier JS P217	10	9	15				19.5
11	(France) #23 Panis Barthez Competition	Oreca 07				7	8	7	19.5
12	(United Kingdom) #43 RLR MSport	Oreca 07	8	Ret	13	Ret	14	15	5.5
13	(Portugal) #31 Algarve Pro Racing	Oreca 07	13	14	12	9	13	11	4.5
14	(Denmark) #20 High Class Racing	Oreca 07	9	17	Ret	11	15	12	4
15	(United Kingdom) #35 BHK Motorsport	Oreca 07	16	15	11	10	11	10	4
16	(United Kingdom) #45 Thunderhead Carlin Racing	Dallara P217	11	11	9	Ret		Ret	3
17	(Poland) #34 Inter Europol Competition	Ligier JS P217	15	13	Ret	12	12	Ret	2
18	(France) #27 IDEC Sport	Ligier JS P217	Ret	16	14	13	Ret	13	2
	(Italy) #47 Cetilar Racing Villorba Corse	Dallara P217		Ret					0

Key
Colour	Result
Gold	Race winner
Silver	2nd place
Bronze	3rd place
Green	Points finish
Blue	Non-points finish
Blue	Non-classified finish (NC)
Purple	Did not finish (Ret)
Black	Disqualified (DSQ)
Black	Excluded (EX)
White	Did not start (DNS)
White	Race cancelled (C)
White	Withdrew (WD)
Blank	Did not participate

**Bold** – Pole
Italics – Fastest Lap

=== LMP3 Teams Championship ===
Pos.	Team	Car	LEC (France)	MNZ (Italy)	BAR (Spain)	SIL (United Kingdom)	SPA (Belgium)	POR (Portugal)	Points
1	(United States) #11 Eurointernational	Ligier JS P3	2	1	**Ret**	1	1	6	102
2	(Poland) #13 Inter Europol Competition	Ligier JS P3	3	2	1	2	2	11	94.5
3	(France) #17 Ultimate	Norma M30	1	Ret	2	7	4	3	76
4	(United Kingdom) #2 United Autosports	Ligier JS P3	6	3	3	3	Ret	2	71
5	(United Kingdom) #7 Nielsen Racing	Norma M30	5	7	4	5	3	5	63
6	(United Kingdom) #6 360 Racing	Ligier JS P3	10	6	12	4	10	1	47.5
7	(Switzerland) #9 Realteam Racing	Norma M30	7	4	8	11	**8**	8	31.5
8	(United Kingdom) #3 United Autosports	Ligier JS P3	8	10	5	Ret	5	Ret	25
9	(United Kingdom) #8 Nielsen Racing	Ligier JS P3	14	Ret	6	9	9	4	24.5
10	(France) #19 M Racing	Norma M30	9	**5**	11	**8**	Ret	**9**	21.5
11	(Italy) #10 Oregon Team	Norma M30	**4**	Ret	10	Ret	7	Ret	20
12	(Poland) #14 Inter Europol Competition	Ligier JS P3	13	9	Ret	Ret	6	7	16.5
13	(United Kingdom) #5 360 Racing	Ligier JS P3	11	8	13	6	12		13.5
14	(United Kingdom) #15 RLR MSport	Ligier JS P3	12	Ret	7	10	11	10	9
15	(Italy) #18 ACE1 Villorba Corse	Ligier JS P3			9				2

Key
Colour	Result
Gold	Race winner
Silver	2nd place
Bronze	3rd place
Green	Points finish
Blue	Non-points finish
Blue	Non-classified finish (NC)
Purple	Did not finish (Ret)
Black	Disqualified (DSQ)
Black	Excluded (EX)
White	Did not start (DNS)
White	Race cancelled (C)
White	Withdrew (WD)
Blank	Did not participate

**Bold** – Pole
Italics – Fastest Lap

=== LMGTE Teams Championship ===
Pos.	Team	Car	LEC (France)	MNZ (Italy)	BAR (Spain)	SIL (United Kingdom)	SPA (Belgium)	POR (Portugal)	Points
1	(United States) #51 Luzich Racing	Ferrari 488 GTE	1	3	1	4	1	1	127
2	(Germany) #77 Dempsey-Proton Racing	Porsche 911 RSR	**3**	**1**	6	7	**2**	**Ret**	76
3	(United Kingdom) #66 JMW Motorsport	Ferrari 488 GTE	4	2	2	6	6	5	74
4	(Switzerland) #83 Kessel Racing	Ferrari 488 GTE	2	6	4	2	4	Ret	68
5	(Switzerland) #55 Spirit of Race	Ferrari 488 GTE	5	7	3	5	3	4	68
6	(Switzerland) #60 Kessel Racing	Ferrari 488 GTE	9	Ret	**8**	3	5	2	50
7	(Italy) #80 EbiMotors	Porsche 911 RSR	6	5	7			3	39
8	(Germany) #88 Proton Competition	Porsche 911 RSR	7	WD		**1**	WD	Ret	32
8	(Germany) #56 Team Project 1	Porsche 911 RSR	8	4	5				26

Key
Colour	Result
Gold	Race winner
Silver	2nd place
Bronze	3rd place
Green	Points finish
Blue	Non-points finish
Blue	Non-classified finish (NC)
Purple	Did not finish (Ret)
Black	Disqualified (DSQ)
Black	Excluded (EX)
White	Did not start (DNS)
White	Race cancelled (C)
White	Withdrew (WD)
Blank	Did not participate

**Bold** – Pole
Italics – Fastest Lap

== Drivers Championships ==
Points are awarded according to the following structure:

Position	**1st**	**2nd**	**3rd**	**4th**	**5th**	**6th**	**7th**	**8th**	**9th**	**10th**	**Other**	**Pole**
Points	25	18	15	12	10	8	6	4	2	1	0.5	1

=== LMP2 Drivers Championship ===
Pos.	Driver	Team	LEC (France)	MNZ (Italy)	BAR (Spain)	SIL (United Kingdom)	SPA (Belgium)	POR (Portugal)	Points
1	(France) Paul-Loup Chatin	(France) IDEC Sport	2	2	**5**	1	6	1	105
1	(France) Paul Lafargue	(France) IDEC Sport	2	2	**5**	1	6	1	105
1	(Mexico) Memo Rojas	(France) IDEC Sport	2	2	**5**	1	6	1	105
2	(Russia) Roman Rusinov	(Russia) G-Drive Racing	**4**	1	1	2	4	6	101
2	(Netherlands) Job van Uitert	(Russia) G-Drive Racing	**4**	1	1	2	4	6	101
3	(France) Alexandre Cougnaud	(France) Graff	5	5	2	3	3	3	83
3	(France) Tristan Gommendy	(France) Graff	5	5	2	3	3	3	83
3	(Switzerland) Jonathan Hirschi	(France) Graff	5	5	2	3	3	3	83
4	(United Kingdom) Phil Hanson	(United Kingdom) United Autosports	6	4	7	Ret	**1**	**2**	71
5	(France) Jean-Éric Vergne	(Russia) G-Drive Racing			1	2	4	6	63
6	(Portugal) Filipe Albuquerque	(United Kingdom) United Autosports		4	7	Ret	**1**	**2**	63
7	(Australia) James Allen	(United States) DragonSpeed	1	10	10	**4**	7	9	48
7	(Sweden) Henrik Hedman	(United States) DragonSpeed	1	10	10	**4**	7	9	48
8	(United Kingdom) Ben Hanley	(United States) DragonSpeed	1		10	**4**	7	9	47
9	(United Kingdom) Richard Bradley	(France) Duqueine Engineering	3	6	4	Ret	5	Ret	45
9	(France) Nico Jamin	(France) Duqueine Engineering	3	6	4	Ret	5	Ret	45
9	(France) Pierre Ragues	(France) Duqueine Engineering	3	6	4	Ret	5	Ret	45
10	(Switzerland) Antonin Borga	(Switzerland) Cool Racing	7	**8**	3	Ret	2	14	44.5
10	(France) Nicolas Lapierre	(Switzerland) Cool Racing	7	**8**	3	Ret	2	14	44.5
11	(France) Norman Nato	(Russia) G-Drive Racing	**4**	1					38
12	(United Kingdom) Alex Brundle	(United Kingdom) United Autosports	12	3	8	8	9	4	37.5
12	(Republic of Ireland) Ryan Cullen	(United Kingdom) United Autosports	12	3	8	8	9	4	37.5
13	(United States) William Owen	(United Kingdom) United Autosports		3	8	8	9	4	37
14	(United States) John Falb	(Portugal) Algarve Pro Racing	14	12	6	6	10	5	28
14	(France) Andrea Pizzitola	(Portugal) Algarve Pro Racing	14	12	6	6	10	5	28
15	(France) Olivier Pla	(Portugal) Algarve Pro Racing	14		6	6	10	5	27.5
16	(Switzerland) Alexandre Coigny	(Switzerland) Cool Racing	7	**8**	3	Ret		14	26.5
17	(France) Timothé Buret	(France) Panis Barthez Competition	Ret	7	Ret	5	Ret	8	20
17	(Russia) Konstantin Tereshchenko	(France) Panis Barthez Competition	Ret	7	Ret	5	Ret	8	20
18	(Austria) René Binder	(France) Panis Barthez Competition	10	9	15	7	8	7	19.5
18	(France) Julien Canal	(France) Panis Barthez Competition	10	9	15	7	8	7	19.5
18	(United Kingdom) Will Stevens	(France) Panis Barthez Competition	10	9	15	7	8	7	19.5
19	(United Kingdom) Paul di Resta	(United Kingdom) United Autosports	6						8
20	(Netherlands) Leonard Hoogenboom	(France) Panis Barthez Competition	Ret	7	Ret				6
21	(Canada) John Farano	(United Kingdom) RLR MSport	8	Ret	13	Ret	14	15	5.5
21	(India) Arjun Maini	(United Kingdom) RLR MSport	8	Ret	13	Ret	14	15	5.5
21	(Brazil) Bruno Senna	(United Kingdom) RLR MSport	8	Ret	13		14	15	5.5
22	(Sweden) Henning Enqvist	(Portugal) Algarve Pro Racing	13	14	12	9	13	11	4.5
22	(United States) James French	(Portugal) Algarve Pro Racing	13	14	12	9	13	11	4.5
22	(South Korea) Tacksung Kim	(Portugal) Algarve Pro Racing	13	14	12	9	13	11	4.5
23	(Denmark) Dennis Andersen	(Denmark) High Class Racing	9	17	Ret	11	15	12	4
23	(Denmark) Anders Fjordbach	(Denmark) High Class Racing	9	17	Ret	11	15	12	4
24	(Italy) Sergio Campana	(United Kingdom) BHK Motorsport	16	15	11	10	11	10	4
24	(Italy) Francesco Dracone	(United Kingdom) BHK Motorsport	16	15	11	10	11	10	4
25	(United Kingdom) Ben Barnicoat	(United Kingdom) Thunderhead Carlin Racing	11	11	9	Ret		Ret	3
Pos.	Driver	Team	LEC (France)	MNZ (Italy)	BAR (Spain)	SIL (United Kingdom)	SPA (Belgium)	POR (Portugal)	Points

Key
Colour	Result
Gold	Race winner
Silver	2nd place
Bronze	3rd place
Green	Points finish
Blue	Non-points finish
Blue	Non-classified finish (NC)
Purple	Did not finish (Ret)
Black	Disqualified (DSQ)
Black	Excluded (EX)
White	Did not start (DNS)
White	Race cancelled (C)
White	Withdrew (WD)
Blank	Did not participate

**Bold** – Pole
Italics – Fastest Lap

=== LMP3 Drivers Championship ===
Pos.	Driver	Team	LEC (France)	MNZ (Italy)	BAR (Spain)	SIL (United Kingdom)	SPA (Belgium)	POR (Portugal)	Points
1	(Denmark) Mikkel Jensen	(United States) Eurointernational	2	1	**Ret**	1	1	6	102
1	(Germany) Jens Petersen	(United States) Eurointernational	2	1	**Ret**	1	1	6	102
2	(Germany) Martin Hippe	(Poland) Inter Europol Competition	3	2	1	2	2	11	94.5
2	(United Kingdom) Nigel Moore	(Poland) Inter Europol Competition	3	2	1	2	2	11	94.5
3	(France) François Hériau	(France) Ultimate	1	Ret	2	7	4	3	76
3	(France) Jean-Baptiste Lahaye	(France) Ultimate	1	Ret	2	7	4	3	76
3	(France) Matthieu Lahaye	(France) Ultimate	1	Ret	2	7	4	3	76
4	(United Kingdom) Wayne Boyd	(United Kingdom) United Autosports	6	3	3	3	Ret	2	71
4	(Brazil) Tommy Erdos	(United Kingdom) United Autosports	6	3	3	3	Ret	2	71
4	(Canada) Garett Grist	(United Kingdom) United Autosports	6	3	3	3	Ret	2	71
5	(United Kingdom) Colin Noble	(United Kingdom) Nielsen Racing	5	7	4	5	3	5	63
5	(United Kingdom) Anthony Wells	(United Kingdom) Nielsen Racing	5	7	4	5	3	5	63
6	(Canada) James Dayson	(United Kingdom) 360 Racing	10	6	12	4	10	1	47.5
6	(United Kingdom) Ross Kaiser	(United Kingdom) 360 Racing	10	6	12	4	10	1	47.5
6	(United Kingdom) Terrence Woodward	(United Kingdom) 360 Racing	10	6	12	4	10	1	47.5
7	(Switzerland) David Droux	(Switzerland) Realteam Racing	7	4	8	11	**8**	8	31.5
7	(Switzerland) Esteban García	(Switzerland) Realteam Racing	7	4	8	11	**8**	8	31.5
8	(United Kingdom) Christian England	(United Kingdom) United Autosports	8	10	5	Ret	5	Ret	25
9	(United Kingdom) James Littlejohn	(United Kingdom) Nielsen Racing	14	Ret	6	9	9	4	24.5
10	(United Kingdom) Nicholas Adcock	(United Kingdom) Nielsen Racing			6		9	4	22
Pos.	Driver	Team	LEC (France)	MNZ (Italy)	BAR (Spain)	SIL (United Kingdom)	SPA (Belgium)	POR (Portugal)	Points

Key
Colour	Result
Gold	Race winner
Silver	2nd place
Bronze	3rd place
Green	Points finish
Blue	Non-points finish
Blue	Non-classified finish (NC)
Purple	Did not finish (Ret)
Black	Disqualified (DSQ)
Black	Excluded (EX)
White	Did not start (DNS)
White	Race cancelled (C)
White	Withdrew (WD)
Blank	Did not participate

**Bold** – Pole
Italics – Fastest Lap

=== LMGTE Drivers Championship ===
Pos.	Driver	Team	LEC (France)	MNZ (Italy)	BAR (Spain)	SIL (United Kingdom)	SPA (Belgium)	POR (Portugal)	Points
1	(France) Fabien Lavergne	(United States) Luzich Racing	1	3	1	4	1	1	127
1	(Denmark) Nicklas Nielsen	(United States) Luzich Racing	1	3	1	4	1	1	127
1	(Italy) Alessandro Pier Guidi	(United States) Luzich Racing	1	3	1	4	1	1	127
2	(Italy) Matteo Cairoli	(Germany) Dempsey-Proton Racing	**3**	**1**	6	7	**2**	**Ret**	76
2	(Italy) Riccardo Pera	(Germany) Dempsey-Proton Racing	**3**	**1**	6	7	**2**	**Ret**	76
2	(Germany) Christian Ried	(Germany) Dempsey-Proton Racing	**3**	**1**	6	7	**2**	**Ret**	76
3	(Italy) Matteo Cressoni	(United Kingdom) JMW Motorsport	4	2	2	6	6	5	74
3	(Canada) Wei Lu	(United Kingdom) JMW Motorsport	4	2	2	6	6	5	74
3	(United States) Jeff Segal	(United Kingdom) JMW Motorsport	4	2	2	6	6	5	74
4	(Switzerland) Rahel Frey	(Switzerland) Kessel Racing	2	6	4	2	4	Ret	68
4	(Denmark) Michelle Gatting	(Switzerland) Kessel Racing	2	6	4	2	4	Ret	68
4	(Italy) Manuela Gostner	(Switzerland) Kessel Racing	2	6	4	2	4	Ret	68
5	(United Kingdom) Duncan Cameron	(Switzerland) Spirit of Race	5	7	3	5	3	4	68
5	(Republic of Ireland) Matt Griffin	(Switzerland) Spirit of Race	5	7	3	5	3	4	68
5	(United Kingdom) Aaron Scott	(Switzerland) Spirit of Race	5	7	3	5	3	4	68
6	(Italy) Sergio Pianezzola	(Switzerland) Kessel Racing	9	Ret	**8**	3	5	2	50
7	(Italy) Gianluca Giraudi	(Germany) Proton Competition				**1**			41
7	(Italy) Gianluca Giraudi	(Italy) EbiMotors						3	41
8	(Italy) Fabio Babini	(Italy) EbiMotors	6	5	7			3	39
8	(Italy) Marco Frezza	(Italy) EbiMotors	6	5	7			3	39
9	(Italy) Andrea Piccini	(Switzerland) Kessel Racing	9	Ret	**8**		5	2	35
10	(Austria) Thomas Preining	(Germany) Proton Competition	7	WD		**1**	WD	Ret	35
Pos.	Driver	Team	LEC (France)	MNZ (Italy)	BAR (Spain)	SIL (United Kingdom)	SPA (Belgium)	POR (Portugal)	Points

Key
Colour	Result
Gold	Race winner
Silver	2nd place
Bronze	3rd place
Green	Points finish
Blue	Non-points finish
Blue	Non-classified finish (NC)
Purple	Did not finish (Ret)
Black	Disqualified (DSQ)
Black	Excluded (EX)
White	Did not start (DNS)
White	Race cancelled (C)
White	Withdrew (WD)
Blank	Did not participate

**Bold** – Pole
Italics – Fastest Lap
