= Claudio Schiavoni =

Italian racing driver

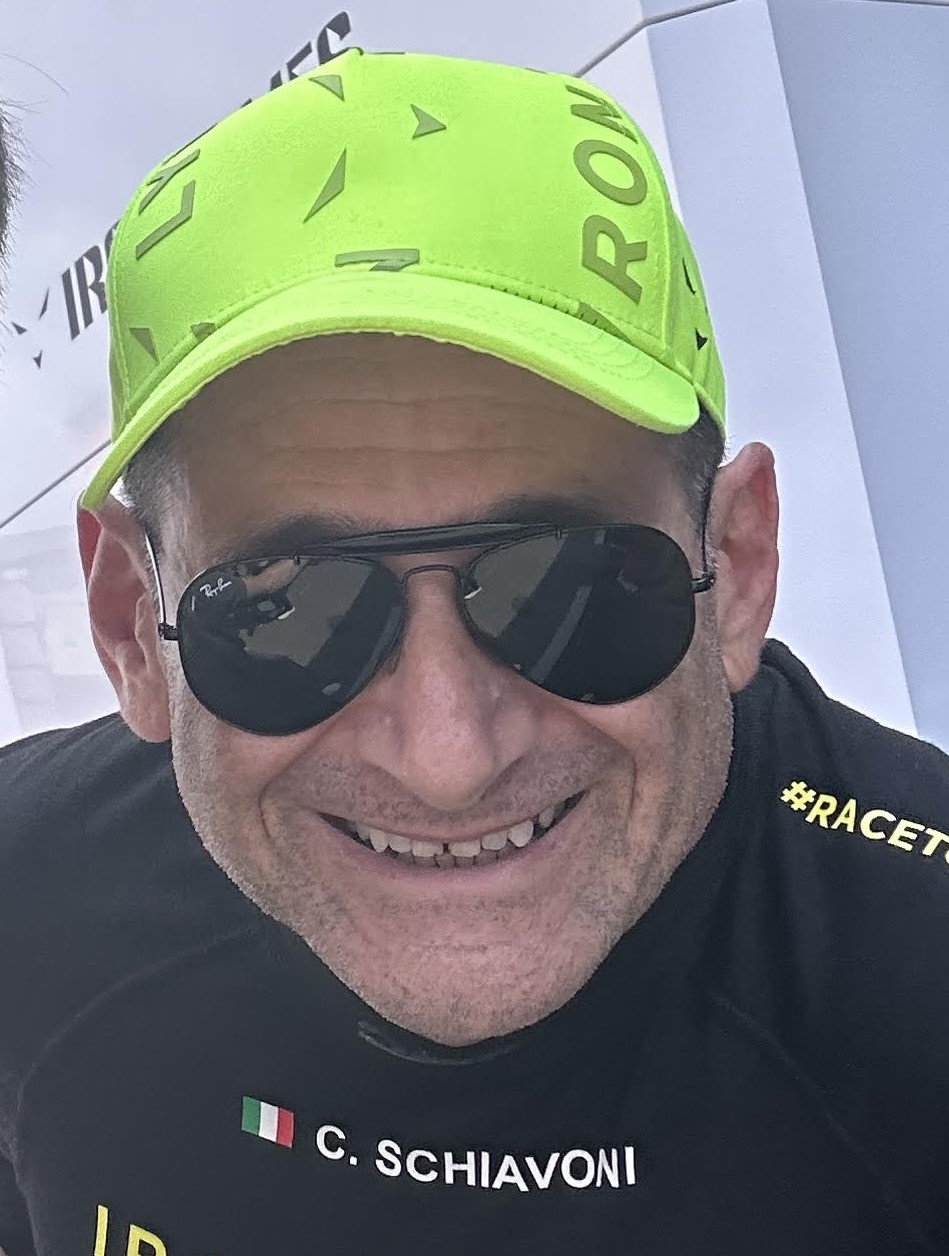
- Schiavoni in 2023
- Nationality: (Italy) Italian
- Born: November 14, 1960 (age 65)

FIA World Endurance Championship career
- Debut season: 2021
- Current team: Iron Lynx
- Categorisation: FIA Bronze
- Car number: 60
- Starts: 6
- Best finish: 10th in 2021

Previous series
- 2016-18,20-21 2017-18 2017-20 2019-: Ferrari Challenge; Blancpain GT Sports Club; Michelin Le Mans Cup; European Le Mans Series
- Statistics up to date as of March 24, 2022.

Claudio Schiavoni (born 14 November 1960) is an Italian racing driver, and co-founder and part-owner of racing team Iron Lynx, currently competing in the FIA World Endurance Championship and the European Le Mans Series. Schiavoni previously competed in the Ferrari Challenge, Blancpain GT Sports Club and Michelin Le Mans Cup with Kessel Racing and Scuderia Niki. Schiavoni has competed in the Gulf 12 Hours three times, finishing third in his class for Kessel Racing in 2016 and 2017.

== Racing record ==
=== Racing career summary ===
Season	Series	Team	Races	Wins	Poles	F/Laps	Podiums	Points	Position
2016	Ferrari Challenge Europe - Coppa Shell	Scuderia Niki Hasler	13	0	0	1	1	48	8th
2016	Ferrari Challenge World Final - Coppa Shell	Scuderia Niki Hasler	1	0	0	0	0	N/A	22nd
2016	Gulf 12 Hours - GENT	Kessel Racing	1	0	0	0	1	N/A	**3rd**
2017	Ferrari Challenge Europe - Coppa Shell	Kessel Racing	12	0	0	0	0	21	13th
2017	Ferrari Challenge World Final - Coppa Shell	Kessel Racing	1	0	0	0	0	N/A	DNF
2017	Blancpain GT Sports Club	Kessel Racing	2	0	0	0	0	0	NC
2017	Le Mans Cup - GT3	Kessel Racing	3	0	0	0	1	18.5	11th
2017	Gulf 12 Hours - GT	Kessel Racing	1	0	0	0	1	N/A	**3rd**
2018	Le Mans Cup - GT3	Kessel Racing	7	0	0	1	5	79	**3rd**
2018	Ferrari Challenge Europe - Coppa Shell	Kessel Racing	2	0	0	0	0	7	17th
2018	Blancpain GT Sports Club - Titanium Cup	Kessel Racing	4	0	0	1	0	9	10th
2018	Gulf 12 Hours - GT3 Pro-Am	Kessel Racing	2	0	0	0	0	N/A	6th
2019	European Le Mans Series - LMGTE	Kessel Racing	3	0	0	0	0	7	18th
2019	24 Hours of Le Mans - LMGTE Am	Kessel Racing	1	0	0	0	0	N/A	13th
2019	Le Mans Cup - GT3	Kessel Racing	2	0	0	0	0	0	NC†
2019	Italian GT Endurance Championship - GT Light	Iron Lynx	1	1	0	0	1	0	NC†
2020	Le Mans Cup - GT3	Iron Lynx	6	0	0	0	1	48	7th
2020	European Le Mans Series - LMGTE	Iron Lynx	4	0	0	0	0	19	14th
2020	24 Hours of Le Mans - LMGTE Am	Iron Lynx	1	0	0	0	0	N/A	9th
2020	Ferrari Challenge Europe - Coppa Shell	Scuderia Niki - Iron Lynx	4	0	0	0	0	20	9th
2021	FIA World Endurance Championship - LMGTE Am	Iron Lynx	5	0	0	0	0	62	7th
2021	24 Hours of Le Mans - LMGTE Am	Iron Lynx	1	0	0	0	0	N/A	4th
2021	European Le Mans Series - LMGTE	Iron Lynx	6	0	0	0	0	50	10th
2021	Italian GT Championship Endurance - GT3 Am	Iron Lynx	1	0	0	0	0	0	NC†
2021	Ferrari Challenge Europe - Coppa Shell	Scuderia Niki - Iron Lynx	4	0	0	0	0	20	9th
2021	Ferrari Challenge World Final - Coppa Shell	Scuderia Niki - Iron Lynx	1	0	0	0	0	N/A	8th
2022	FIA World Endurance Championship - LMGTE Am	Iron Lynx	6	0	0	0	0	25	19th
2022	24 Hours of Le Mans - LMGTE Am	Iron Lynx	1	0	0	0	0	N/A	NC
2022	European Le Mans Series - LMGTE	Iron Lynx	5	0	0	0	0	63	4th
2022	Ferrari Challenge Europe - Coppa Shell	Scuderia Niki - Iron Lynx	2	0	0	0	0	2	15th
2023	FIA World Endurance Championship - LMGTE Am	Iron Lynx	7	0	0	0	1	30	15th
2023	European Le Mans Series - LMGTE	Iron Lynx	6	1	0	0	3	80	**3rd**
2023	IMSA SportsCar Championship - GTD	Iron Lynx	1	0	0	0	0	190	60th
2023	24 Hours of Le Mans - LMGTE Am	Iron Lynx	1	0	0	0	0	N/A	DNF
2024	FIA World Endurance Championship - LMGT3	Iron Lynx	7	0	0	0	1	15*	21st*
2024	IMSA SportsCar Championship - GTD Pro	Iron Lynx	2	0	0	0	0	484	24th
2024	European Le Mans Series - LMGT3	Proton Competition	6	0	0	0	1	39	13th
2024-25	Asian Le Mans Series - GT	Proton Competition	6	0	0	0	0	10	18th
2025	FIA World Endurance Championship - LMGT3	Iron Lynx	2	0	0	0	0	0	30th
2025	IMSA SportsCar Championship - GTD Pro	Proton Competition	2	0	0	0	0	477	24th
2025	European Le Mans Series - LMGT3	Proton Competition	1	0	0	0	1	15	16th

† As Schiavoni was a guest driver, he was ineligible to score championship points.

=== Complete European Le Mans Series results ===
(key) (Races in bold indicate pole position; results in italics indicate fastest lap)

Year	Entrant	Class	Chassis	Engine	1	2	3	4	5	6	Rank	Points
2019	Kessel Racing	LMGTE	Ferrari 488 GTE	Ferrari F154CB 3.9 L Turbo V8	LEC; 9	MNZ; Ret					18th	7
2019	Kessel Racing	LMGTE	Ferrari 488 GTE Evo	Ferrari F154CB 3.9 L Turbo V8			**CAT**; 8	SIL	SPA	ALG	18th	7
2020	Iron Lynx	LMGTE	Ferrari 488 GTE Evo	Ferrari F154CB 3.9 L Turbo V8	LEC; 6	SPA; Ret	LEC; 5	**MNZ**; Ret	ALG		14th	19
2021	Iron Lynx	LMGTE	Ferrari 488 GTE Evo	Ferrari F154CB 3.9 L Turbo V8	CAT; 5	RBR; 7	LEC; 5	MNZ; 5	SPA; 5	ALG; 8	8th	50
2022	Iron Lynx	LMGTE	Ferrari 488 GTE Evo	Ferrari F154CB 3.9 L Turbo V8	LEC; 7	IMO; 5	MNZ; 1	CAT; 6	SPA; 9	ALG; 4	4th	63
2023	Iron Lynx	LMGTE	Porsche 911 RSR-19	Porsche M97/80 4.2 L Flat-6	CAT; 4	LEC; 2	ARA; 7	SPA; 1	ALG; 3	PRT; 8	3rd	80
2024	Proton Competition	LMGT3	Porsche 911 GT3 R (992)	Porsche M97/80 4.2 L Flat-6	CAT; 4	LEC; 8	IMO; 11	SPA; 6	MUG; Ret	ALG; 3	13th	39
2025	Proton Competition	LMGT3	Porsche 911 GT3 R (992)	Porsche M97/80 4.2 L Flat-6	CAT; 3	LEC; WD	IMO	SPA	SIL	ALG	16th	15

^{*} Season still in progress.

=== Complete 24 Hours of Le Mans results ===
Year	Team	Co-Drivers	Car	Class	Laps	Pos.	Class Pos.
2019	(Switzerland) Kessel Racing	(Italy) Sergio Pianezzola (Italy) Andrea Piccini	Ferrari 488 GTE	LMGTE Am	330	39th	9th
2020	(Italy) Iron Lynx	(Italy) Sergio Pianezzola (Italy) Paolo Ruberti	Ferrari 488 GTE Evo	LMGTE Am	331	37th	9th
2021	(Italy) Iron Lynx	(Italy) Raffaele Giammaria (Italy) Paolo Ruberti	Ferrari 488 GTE Evo	GTE Am	335	30th	4th
2022	(Italy) Iron Lynx	(Italy) Alessandro Balzan (Italy) Raffaele Giammaria	Ferrari 488 GTE Evo	GTE Am	289	NC	NC
2023	(Italy) Iron Lynx	(Italy) Matteo Cressoni (Belgium) Alessio Picariello	Porsche 911 RSR-19	GTE Am	28	DNF	DNF
2024	(Italy) Iron Lynx	(Italy) Matteo Cressoni (France) Franck Perera	Lamborghini Huracán GT3 Evo 2	LMGT3	258	44th	16th

=== Complete FIA World Endurance Championship results ===
(key) (Races in bold indicate pole position; races in italics indicate fastest lap)

Year	Entrant	Class	Chassis	Engine	1	2	3	4	5	6	7	8	Rank	Points
2021	Iron Lynx	LMGTE Am	Ferrari 488 GTE Evo	Ferrari F154CB 3.9 L Turbo V8	SPA; 9	POR; 5	MON; Ret	LMS; 4	BHR	BHR; 5			7th	62
2022	Iron Lynx	LMGTE Am	Ferrari 488 GTE Evo	Ferrari F154CB 3.9 L Turbo V8	SEB; 8	SPA; 8	LMS; Ret	MON; 4	FUJ; 11	BHR; 9			19th	25
2023	Iron Lynx	LMGTE Am	Porsche 911 RSR-19	Porsche M97/80 4.2 L Flat-6	SEB; 6	PRT; 12	SPA; 11	LMS; Ret	MNZ; 2	FUJ; 11	BHR; Ret		15th	30
2024	Iron Lynx	LMGT3	Lamborghini Huracán GT3 Evo 2	Lamborghini DGF 5.2 L V10	QAT; 12	IMO; 13	SPA; 3	LMS; 13	SÃO; 14	COA; 12	FUJ; 13	BHR; 4	19th	33
2025	Iron Lynx	LMGT3	Mercedes-AMG GT3 Evo	Mercedes-AMG M159 6.2 L V8	QAT; NC	IMO; 15	SPA	LMS	SÃO	COA	FUJ	BHR	30th	0

^{*} Season still in progress.

==== Complete IMSA SportsCar Championship results ====
(key) (Races in bold indicate pole position; results in italics indicate fastest lap)

Year	Team	Class	Make	Engine	1	2	3	4	5	6	7	8	9	10	11	Rank	Points	Ref
2023	Iron Lynx	GTD	Lamborghini Huracán GT3 Evo 2	Lamborghini DGF 5.2 L V10	DAY; 12	SEB	LBH	MON	WGL	MOS	LIM	ELK	VIR	IMS	PET	60th	190	
2024	Iron Lynx	GTD Pro	Lamborghini Huracán GT3 Evo 2	Lamborghini DGF 5.2 L V10	DAY; 12	SEB; 7	LGA	DET	WGL	MOS	ELK	VIR	IMS	ATL		29th	484	
2025	Proton Competition	GTD Pro	Porsche 911 GT3 R (992)	Porsche M97/80 4.2 L Flat-6	DAY; 10	SEB; 8	LGA	DET	WGL	MOS	ELK	VIR	IMS	ATL		24th	477	
