= 2019 4 Hours of Le Castellet =

Layout of Circuit Paul Ricard, where the race was held.

The 2019 4 Hours of Le Castellet was an endurance sportscar racing event held on April 14, 2019, at Circuit Paul Ricard. It was the first round of the 2019 European Le Mans Series.

== Race ==
=== Race results ===
Class winners are in bold and ‡.

Pos	Class	No	Team	Drivers	Chassis	Tyre	Laps	Time/Retired
Pos	Class	No	Team	Drivers	Engine	Tyre	Laps	Time/Retired
1	**LMP2**	**21**	**(United States) DragonSpeed**	**(Australia) James Allen** **(Sweden) Henrik Hedman** **(United Kingdom) Ben Hanley**	**Oreca 07**	MI	**135**	**4:00:46.937‡**
1	**LMP2**	**21**	**(United States) DragonSpeed**	**(Australia) James Allen** **(Sweden) Henrik Hedman** **(United Kingdom) Ben Hanley**	**Gibson GK428 4.2 L V8**	MI	**135**	**4:00:46.937‡**
2	LMP2	28	(France) IDEC Sport	(France) Paul-Loup Chatin (France) Paul Lafargue (Mexico) Memo Rojas	Oreca 07	MI	135	+16.655
2	LMP2	28	(France) IDEC Sport	(France) Paul-Loup Chatin (France) Paul Lafargue (Mexico) Memo Rojas	Gibson GK428 4.2 L V8	MI	135	+16.655
3	LMP2	30	(France) Duqueine Engineering	(United Kingdom) Richard Bradley (France) Nico Jamin (France) Pierre Ragues	Oreca 07	MI	135	+30.659
3	LMP2	30	(France) Duqueine Engineering	(United Kingdom) Richard Bradley (France) Nico Jamin (France) Pierre Ragues	Gibson GK428 4.2 L V8	MI	135	+30.659
4	LMP2	26	(Russia) G-Drive Racing	(Russia) Roman Rusinov (Netherlands) Job van Uitert (France) Norman Nato	Aurus 01	D	135	+41.534
4	LMP2	26	(Russia) G-Drive Racing	(Russia) Roman Rusinov (Netherlands) Job van Uitert (France) Norman Nato	Gibson GK428 4.2 L V8	D	135	+41.534
5	LMP2	39	(France) Graff	(France) Alexandre Cougnaud (France) Tristan Gommendy (Switzerland) Jonathan Hirschi	Oreca 07	MI	135	+1:38.408
5	LMP2	39	(France) Graff	(France) Alexandre Cougnaud (France) Tristan Gommendy (Switzerland) Jonathan Hirschi	Gibson GK428 4.2 L V8	MI	135	+1:38.408
6	LMP2	22	(United Kingdom) United Autosports	(United Kingdom) Phil Hanson (United Kingdom) Paul di Resta	Ligier JS P217	MI	134	+1 Lap
6	LMP2	22	(United Kingdom) United Autosports	(United Kingdom) Phil Hanson (United Kingdom) Paul di Resta	Gibson GK428 4.2 L V8	MI	134	+1 Lap
7	LMP2	37	(Switzerland) Cool Racing	(Switzerland) Antonin Borga (Switzerland) Alexandre Coigny (France) Nicolas Lapierre	Oreca 07	MI	134	+1 Lap
7	LMP2	37	(Switzerland) Cool Racing	(Switzerland) Antonin Borga (Switzerland) Alexandre Coigny (France) Nicolas Lapierre	Gibson GK428 4.2 L V8	MI	134	+1 Lap
8	LMP2	43	(United Kingdom) RLR MSport	(Canada) John Farano (India) Arjun Maini (Brazil) Bruno Senna	Oreca 07	D	134	+1 Lap
8	LMP2	43	(United Kingdom) RLR MSport	(Canada) John Farano (India) Arjun Maini (Brazil) Bruno Senna	Gibson GK428 4.2 L V8	D	134	+1 Lap
9	LMP2	20	(Denmark) High Class Racing	(Denmark) Dennis Andersen (Denmark) Anders Fjordbach	Oreca 07	D	133	+2 Laps
9	LMP2	20	(Denmark) High Class Racing	(Denmark) Dennis Andersen (Denmark) Anders Fjordbach	Gibson GK428 4.2 L V8	D	133	+2 Laps
10	LMP2	23	(France) Panis Barthez Competition	(Austria) René Binder (France) Julien Canal (United Kingdom) Will Stevens	Ligier JS P217	D	133	+2 Laps
10	LMP2	23	(France) Panis Barthez Competition	(Austria) René Binder (France) Julien Canal (United Kingdom) Will Stevens	Gibson GK428 4.2 L V8	D	133	+2 Laps
11	LMP2	45	(United Kingdom) Thunderhead Carlin Racing	(United Kingdom) Ben Barnicoat (United Kingdom) Jack Manchester (France) Olivier Pla	Dallara P217	D	133	+2 Laps
11	LMP2	45	(United Kingdom) Thunderhead Carlin Racing	(United Kingdom) Ben Barnicoat (United Kingdom) Jack Manchester (France) Olivier Pla	Gibson GK428 4.2 L V8	D	133	+2 Laps
12	LMP2	32	(United Kingdom) United Autosports	(United Kingdom) Alex Brundle (Republic of Ireland) Ryan Cullen	Ligier JS P217	MI	132	+3 Laps
12	LMP2	32	(United Kingdom) United Autosports	(United Kingdom) Alex Brundle (Republic of Ireland) Ryan Cullen	Gibson GK428 4.2 L V8	MI	132	+3 Laps
13	LMP2	31	(Portugal) Algarve Pro Racing	(Sweden) Henning Enqvist (United States) James French (South Korea) Tacksung Kim	Oreca 07	D	132	+3 Laps
13	LMP2	31	(Portugal) Algarve Pro Racing	(Sweden) Henning Enqvist (United States) James French (South Korea) Tacksung Kim	Gibson GK428 4.2 L V8	D	132	+3 Laps
14	LMP2	25	(Portugal) Algarve Pro Racing	(United States) John Falb (France) Andrea Pizzitola (United States) Mark Patterson	Oreca 07	D	132	+3 Laps
14	LMP2	25	(Portugal) Algarve Pro Racing	(United States) John Falb (France) Andrea Pizzitola (United States) Mark Patterson	Gibson GK428 4.2 L V8	D	132	+3 Laps
15	LMP2	34	(Poland) Inter Europol Competition	(Spain) Dani Clos (France) Léo Roussel (Poland) Jakub Śmiechowski	Ligier JS P217	MI	131	+4 Laps
15	LMP2	34	(Poland) Inter Europol Competition	(Spain) Dani Clos (France) Léo Roussel (Poland) Jakub Śmiechowski	Gibson GK428 4.2 L V8	MI	131	+4 Laps
16	LMP2	35	(United Kingdom) BHK Motorsport	(Italy) Sergio Campana (Italy) Francesco Dracone	Oreca 07	D	131	+4 Laps
16	LMP2	35	(United Kingdom) BHK Motorsport	(Italy) Sergio Campana (Italy) Francesco Dracone	Gibson GK428 4.2 L V8	D	131	+4 Laps
17	**LMP3**	**17**	**(France) Ultimate**	**(France) François Heriau** **(France) Jean-Baptiste Lahaye** **(France) Matthieu Lahaye**	**Norma M30**	MI	**125**	**+10 Laps‡**
17	**LMP3**	**17**	**(France) Ultimate**	**(France) François Heriau** **(France) Jean-Baptiste Lahaye** **(France) Matthieu Lahaye**	**Nissan VK50VE 5.0 L V8**	MI	**125**	**+10 Laps‡**
18	LMP3	11	(United States) Eurointernational	(Denmark) Mikkel Jensen (Germany) Jens Petersen	Ligier JS P3	MI	124	+11 Laps
18	LMP3	11	(United States) Eurointernational	(Denmark) Mikkel Jensen (Germany) Jens Petersen	Nissan VK50VE 5.0 L V8	MI	124	+11 Laps
19	LMP3	13	(Poland) Inter Europol Competition	(Germany) Martin Hippe (United Kingdom) Nigel Moore	Ligier JS P3	MI	124	+11 Laps
19	LMP3	13	(Poland) Inter Europol Competition	(Germany) Martin Hippe (United Kingdom) Nigel Moore	Nissan VK50VE 5.0 L V8	MI	124	+11 Laps
20	LMP3	10	(Italy) Oregon Team	(Italy) Lorenzo Bontempelli (Italy) Damiano Fioravanti (Lithuania) Gustas Grinbergas	Norma M30	MI	124	+11 Laps
20	LMP3	10	(Italy) Oregon Team	(Italy) Lorenzo Bontempelli (Italy) Damiano Fioravanti (Lithuania) Gustas Grinbergas	Nissan VK50VE 5.0 L V8	MI	124	+11 Laps
21	LMP3	7	(United Kingdom) Nielsen Racing	(United Kingdom) Colin Noble (United Kingdom) Anthony Wells	Norma M30	MI	124	+11 Laps
21	LMP3	7	(United Kingdom) Nielsen Racing	(United Kingdom) Colin Noble (United Kingdom) Anthony Wells	Nissan VK50VE 5.0 L V8	MI	124	+11 Laps
22	LMP3	2	(United Kingdom) United Autosports	(United Kingdom) Wayne Boyd (Brazil) Tommy Erdos (Canada) Garett Grist	Ligier JS P3	MI	124	+11 Laps
22	LMP3	2	(United Kingdom) United Autosports	(United Kingdom) Wayne Boyd (Brazil) Tommy Erdos (Canada) Garett Grist	Nissan VK50VE 5.0 L V8	MI	124	+11 Laps
23	LMP3	9	(Switzerland) Realteam Racing	(Switzerland) David Droux (Switzerland) Esteban García	Norma M30	MI	124	+11 Laps
23	LMP3	9	(Switzerland) Realteam Racing	(Switzerland) David Droux (Switzerland) Esteban García	Nissan VK50VE 5.0 L V8	MI	124	+11 Laps
24	LMP3	3	(United Kingdom) United Autosports	(United Kingdom) Christian England (United States) Michael Guasch	Ligier JS P3	MI	123	+12 Laps
24	LMP3	3	(United Kingdom) United Autosports	(United Kingdom) Christian England (United States) Michael Guasch	Nissan VK50VE 5.0 L V8	MI	123	+12 Laps
25	LMP3	19	(France) M Racing	(Switzerland) Lucas Légeret (France) Laurent Millara (France) Yann Ehrlacher	Norma M30	MI	123	+12 Laps
25	LMP3	19	(France) M Racing	(Switzerland) Lucas Légeret (France) Laurent Millara (France) Yann Ehrlacher	Nissan VK50VE 5.0 L V8	MI	123	+12 Laps
26	LMP3	6	(United Kingdom) 360 Racing	(Canada) James Dayson (United Kingdom) Ross Kaiser (United Kingdom) Terrence Woodward	Ligier JS P3	MI	123	+12 Laps
26	LMP3	6	(United Kingdom) 360 Racing	(Canada) James Dayson (United Kingdom) Ross Kaiser (United Kingdom) Terrence Woodward	Nissan VK50VE 5.0 L V8	MI	123	+12 Laps
27	**LMGTE**	**51**	**(United States) Luzich Racing**	**(France) Fabien Lavergne** **(Denmark) Nicklas Nielsen** **(Italy) Alessandro Pier Guidi**	**Ferrari 488 GTE**	D	**123**	**+12 Laps‡**
27	**LMGTE**	**51**	**(United States) Luzich Racing**	**(France) Fabien Lavergne** **(Denmark) Nicklas Nielsen** **(Italy) Alessandro Pier Guidi**	**Ferrari F154CB 3.9 L Turbo V8**	D	**123**	**+12 Laps‡**
28	LMP3	5	(United Kingdom) 360 Racing	(Australia) John Corbett (Greece) Andreas Laskaratos (United Kingdom) James Winslow	Ligier JS P3	MI	123	+12 Laps
28	LMP3	5	(United Kingdom) 360 Racing	(Australia) John Corbett (Greece) Andreas Laskaratos (United Kingdom) James Winslow	Nissan VK50VE 5.0 L V8	MI	123	+12 Laps
29	LMP3	15	(United Kingdom) RLR MSport	(Denmark) Christian Stubbe Olsen (United Kingdom) Martin Rich (Denmark) Martin Vedel Mortensen	Ligier JS P3	MI	122	+13 Laps
29	LMP3	15	(United Kingdom) RLR MSport	(Denmark) Christian Stubbe Olsen (United Kingdom) Martin Rich (Denmark) Martin Vedel Mortensen	Nissan VK50VE 5.0 L V8	MI	122	+13 Laps
30	LMGTE	83	(Switzerland) Kessel Racing	(Switzerland) Rahel Frey (Denmark) Michelle Gatting (Italy) Manuela Gostner	Ferrari 488 GTE	D	122	+13 Laps
30	LMGTE	83	(Switzerland) Kessel Racing	(Switzerland) Rahel Frey (Denmark) Michelle Gatting (Italy) Manuela Gostner	Ferrari F154CB 3.9 L Turbo V8	D	122	+13 Laps
31	LMGTE	77	(Germany) Dempsey-Proton Racing	(Italy) Matteo Cairoli (Italy) Riccardo Pera (Germany) Christian Ried	Porsche 911 RSR	D	122	+13 Laps
31	LMGTE	77	(Germany) Dempsey-Proton Racing	(Italy) Matteo Cairoli (Italy) Riccardo Pera (Germany) Christian Ried	Porsche 4.0 L Flat-6	D	122	+13 Laps
32	LMGTE	66	(United Kingdom) JMW Motorsport	(Italy) Matteo Cressoni (Canada) Wei Lu (United States) Jeff Segal	Ferrari 488 GTE	D	122	+13 Laps
32	LMGTE	66	(United Kingdom) JMW Motorsport	(Italy) Matteo Cressoni (Canada) Wei Lu (United States) Jeff Segal	Ferrari F154CB 3.9 L Turbo V8	D	122	+13 Laps
33	LMGTE	55	(Switzerland) Spirit of Race	(United Kingdom) Duncan Cameron (Republic of Ireland) Matt Griffin (United Kingdom) Aaron Scott	Ferrari 488 GTE	D	122	+13 Laps
33	LMGTE	55	(Switzerland) Spirit of Race	(United Kingdom) Duncan Cameron (Republic of Ireland) Matt Griffin (United Kingdom) Aaron Scott	Ferrari F154CB 3.9 L Turbo V8	D	122	+13 Laps
34	LMGTE	80	(Italy) EbiMotors	(Italy) Fabio Babini (Italy) Marco Frezza (Italy) Sébastien Fortuna	Porsche 911 RSR	D	122	+13 Laps
34	LMGTE	80	(Italy) EbiMotors	(Italy) Fabio Babini (Italy) Marco Frezza (Italy) Sébastien Fortuna	Porsche 4.0 L Flat-6	D	122	+13 Laps
35	LMP3	14	(Poland) Inter Europol Competition	(Germany) Paul Scheuschner (France) Dino Lunardi	Ligier JS P3	MI	122	+13 Laps
35	LMP3	14	(Poland) Inter Europol Competition	(Germany) Paul Scheuschner (France) Dino Lunardi	Nissan VK50VE 5.0 L V8	MI	122	+13 Laps
36	LMGTE	88	(Germany) Proton Competition	(Austria) Thomas Preining (Austria) Horst Felbermayr Jr (Germany) Marco Seefried	Porsche 911 RSR	D	121	+14 Laps
36	LMGTE	88	(Germany) Proton Competition	(Austria) Thomas Preining (Austria) Horst Felbermayr Jr (Germany) Marco Seefried	Porsche 4.0 L Flat-6	D	121	+14 Laps
37	LMP3	8	(United Kingdom) Nielsen Racing	(United Kingdom) James Littlejohn (Japan) Nobuya Yamanaka	Ligier JS P3	MI	121	+14 Laps
37	LMP3	8	(United Kingdom) Nielsen Racing	(United Kingdom) James Littlejohn (Japan) Nobuya Yamanaka	Nissan VK50VE 5.0 L V8	MI	121	+14 Laps
38	LMGTE	56	(Germany) Team Project 1	(Germany) Jörg Bergmeister (Norway) Egidio Perfetti (Italy) Giorgio Roda	Porsche 911 RSR	D	121	+14 Laps
38	LMGTE	56	(Germany) Team Project 1	(Germany) Jörg Bergmeister (Norway) Egidio Perfetti (Italy) Giorgio Roda	Porsche 4.0 L Flat-6	D	121	+14 Laps
39	LMGTE	60	(Switzerland) Kessel Racing	(Italy) Sergio Pianezzola (Italy) Andrea Piccini (Italy) Claudio Schiavoni	Ferrari 488 GTE	D	121	+14 Laps
39	LMGTE	60	(Switzerland) Kessel Racing	(Italy) Sergio Pianezzola (Italy) Andrea Piccini (Italy) Claudio Schiavoni	Ferrari F154CB 3.9 L Turbo V8	D	121	+14 Laps
40	LMP2	24	(France) Panis Barthez Competition	(France) Timothé Buret (Russia) Konstantin Tereshchenko (Netherlands) Léonard Hoogenboom	Ligier JS P217	D	130	Did not finish
40	LMP2	24	(France) Panis Barthez Competition	(France) Timothé Buret (Russia) Konstantin Tereshchenko (Netherlands) Léonard Hoogenboom	Gibson GK428 4.2 L V8	D	130	Did not finish
41	LMP2	27	(France) IDEC Sport	(France) Stéphane Adler (France) Erik Maris (France) Patrice Lafargue	Ligier JS P217	MI	49	Did not finish
41	LMP2	27	(France) IDEC Sport	(France) Stéphane Adler (France) Erik Maris (France) Patrice Lafargue	Gibson GK428 4.2 L V8	MI	49	Did not finish

European Le Mans Series
Previous race: none	2019 season	Next race: Monza
