= 2023 4 Hours of Abu Dhabi =

2023 endurance sportscar racing event

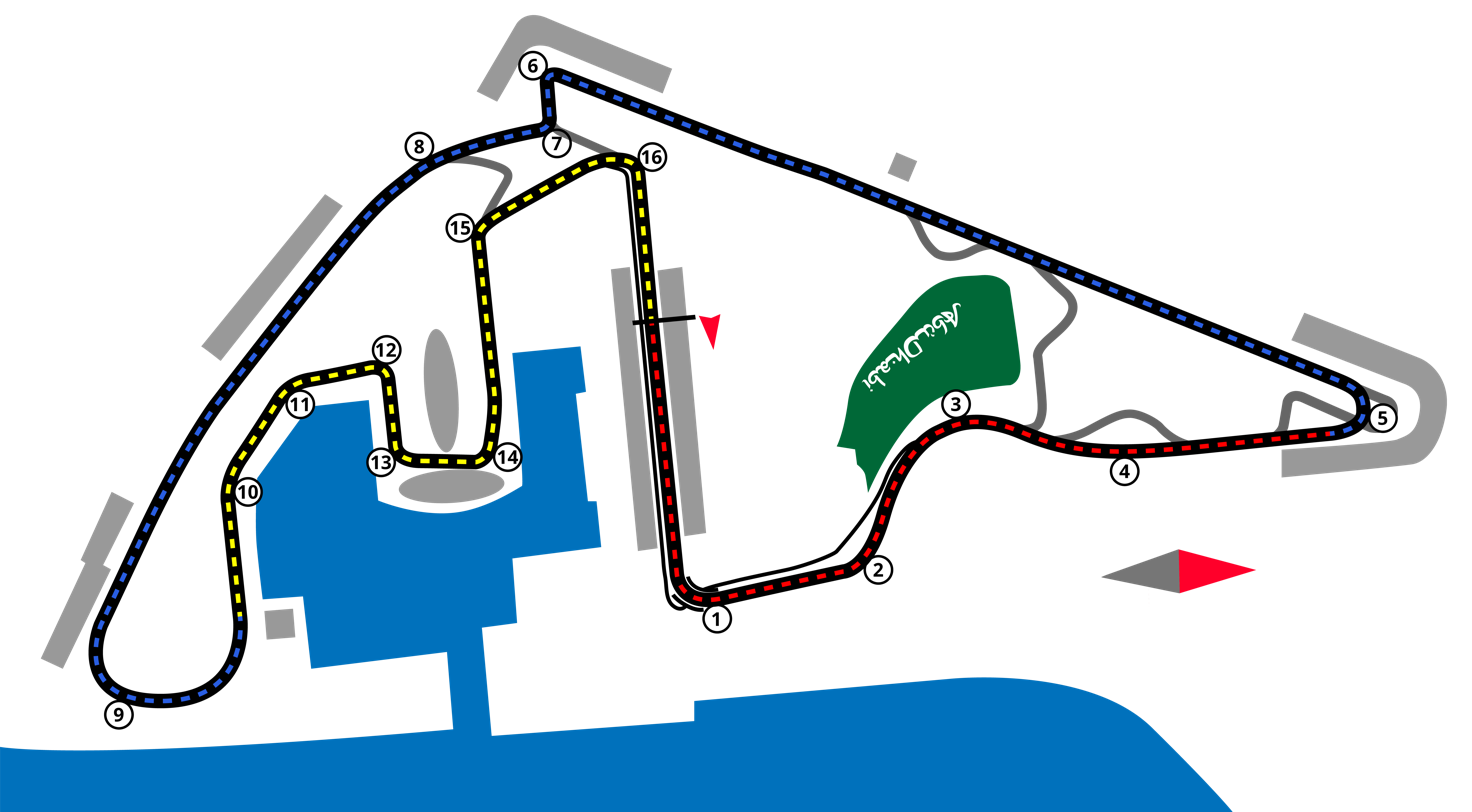
The layout of the Yas Marina Circuit

The 2023 4 Hours of Abu Dhabi was an endurance sportscar racing event held between 17 and 19 February 2023, as final rounds of 2023 Asian Le Mans Series season.

== Schedule ==
Date	Time (local: GST)	Event
Friday, 17 February	13:30	Free Practice 1
Friday, 17 February	17:15	Free Practice 2
Saturday, 18 February	10:40	Qualifying - GT
Saturday, 18 February	11:10	Qualifying - LMP2 and LMP3
Saturday, 18 February	15:00	Race 1
Sunday, 19 February	13:15	Warm-up
Sunday, 19 February	16:00	Race 2

== Entry list ==
The No. 65 Viper Niza Racing withdrew from this racing weekend after an accident during 4 Hours of Dubai Race 2. The No. 54 Dinamic GT and No. 61 TF Sport also withdrew from Abu Dhabi races.

Ollie Millroy and Benjamin Barker continued to drive for No. 72 HubAuto Racing and No. 74 Kessel Racing respectively after being substitutes in Dubai. Marvin Kirchhöfer raced for No. 88 Garage 59 after missing both Dubai races because of being ill. Ahmad Al Harthy joined 99 Racing as Bronze-rated driver. Nicolas Lapierre, the driver of No. 37 Cool Racing, decided to step down from driving duties this weekend to allow Malthe Jakobsen gain more track time.

== Free practice ==
- Only the fastest car in each class is shown.

Free Practice 1	Class	No.	Entrant	Time
Free Practice 1	LMP2	22	(United Kingdom) United Autosports	1:42.821
Free Practice 1	LMP3	17	(Switzerland) Cool Racing	1:47.986
Free Practice 1	GT	7	(Oman) Haupt Racing Team	1:53.429
Free Practice 2	Class	No.	Entrant	Time
Free Practice 2	LMP2	37	(Switzerland) Cool Racing	1:41.957
Free Practice 2	LMP3	11	(Germany) WTM by Rinaldi Racing	1:48.232
Free Practice 2	GT	95	(United Kingdom) TF Sport	1:52.992

== Race 1 ==
=== Qualifying ===
Pole position winners in each class are marked in bold.

Pos	Class	No.	Team	Driver	Time	Gap	Grid
1	**LMP2**	**98**	**(United Kingdom) 99 Racing**	**(Oman) Ahmad Al Harthy**	**1:42.644**	—	1
2	LMP2	3	(Luxembourg) DKR Engineering	(Turkey) Salih Yoluç	1:43.731	+1.087	2
3	LMP2	24	(United Kingdom) Nielsen Racing	(United States) Rodrigo Sales	1:43.734	+1.090	3
4	LMP2	43	(Poland) Inter Europol Competition	(United States) Charles Crews	1:44.044	+1.400	4
5	LMP2	25	(Portugal) Algarve Pro Racing	(United States) John Falb	1:44.138	+1.494	5
6	LMP2	37	(Switzerland) Cool Racing	(Switzerland) Alexandre Coigny	1:44.471	+1.827	6
7	LMP2	44	(Slovakia) ARC Bratislava	(Slovakia) Miro Konôpka	1:47.949	+5.305	7
8	**LMP3**	**11**	**(Germany) WTM by Rinaldi Racing**	**(Germany) Torsten Kratz**	**1:48.576**	**+5.932**	8
9	LMP2	22	(United Kingdom) United Autosports	(United States) James McGuire	1:48.907	+6.263	9
10	LMP3	73	(Poland) Inter Europol Competition	(Saint Kitts and Nevis) Alexander Bukhantsov	1:49.118	+6.474	11
11	LMP3	4	(United Kingdom) Nielsen Racing	(United Kingdom) Tony Wells	1:49.447	+6.803	12
12	LMP3	55	(Germany) Rinaldi Racing	(Germany) Matthias Lüthen	1:49.450	+6.806	13
13	LMP3	29	(France) MV2S Racing	(Switzerland) Jérôme de Sadeleer	1:49.548	+6.904	14
14	LMP3	9	(France) Graff Racing	(France) Eric Trouillet	1:49.791	+7.147	15
15	LMP3	17	(Switzerland) Cool Racing	(France) Adrien Chila	1:49.925	+7.281	16
16	LMP3	5	(Luxembourg) DKR Engineering	(Belgium) Tom van Rompuy	1:50.040	+7.396	17
17	LMP3	8	(France) Graff Racing	(France) François Hériau	1:50.399	+7.755	18
18	LMP3	2	(Spain) CD Sport	(United Kingdom) James Sweetnam	1:50.473	+7.829	19
19	LMP3	53	(Poland) Inter Europol Competition	(Portugal) Miguel Cristóvão	1:50.621	+7.977	20
20	LMP3	1	(Spain) CD Sport	(United Kingdom) Nick Adcock	1:50.677	+8.033	21
21	LMP3	15	(United Kingdom) RLR MSport	(Saint Kitts and Nevis) Amir Feyzulin	1:51.420	+8.776	22
22	**GT**	**72**	**(Chinese Taipei) HubAuto Racing**	**(Australia) Liam Talbot**	**1:52.776**	**+10.132**	23
23	LMP3	63	(Poland) Inter Europol Competition	(United States) John Schauerman	1:52.825	+10.181	24
24	GT	34	(Germany) Walkenhorst Motorsport	(United States) Thomas Merrill	1:52.833	+10.189	25
25	GT	7	(Oman) Haupt Racing Team	(Austria) Martin Konrad	1:53.001	+10.357	26
26	GT	21	(Italy) AF Corse	(Italy) Stefano Costantini	1:53.411	+10.767	27
27	GT	99	(Germany) Herberth Motorsport	(Germany) Ralf Bohn	1:53.515	+10.871	28
28	GT	10	(Germany) GetSpeed Performance	(Germany) Florian Scholze	1:53.543	+10.899	29
29	LMP3	18	(United Kingdom) 360 Racing	(France) Frédéric Jousset	1:53.680	+11.036	30
30	GT	91	(Germany) Herberth Motorsport	(United Kingdom) Alex Malykhin	1:53.702	+11.058	31
31	GT	16	(Germany) GetSpeed Performance	(China) Bihuang Zhou	1:53.967	+11.323	32
32	GT	88	(United Kingdom) Garage 59	(Sweden) Alexander West	1:53.989	+11.345	33
33	GT	66	(Spain) Bullitt Racing	(Australia) Martin Berry	1:54.020	+11.376	34
34	GT	60	(Denmark) Formula Racing	(Denmark) Johnny Laursen	1:54.130	+11.486	35
35	GT	19	(Germany) Leipert Motorsport	(Italy) Gabriel Rindone	1:54.244	+11.600	36
36	GT	33	(Germany) Herberth Motorsport	(Hong Kong) Antares Au	1:54.283	+11.639	37
37	GT	20	(Germany) Herberth Motorsport	(Switzerland) Nicolas Leutwiler	1:54.423	+11.779	38
38	GT	59	(United Kingdom) Garage 59	(United Kingdom) Nick Halstead	1:54.572	+11.928	39
39	GT	74	(Switzerland) Kessel Racing	(Poland) Michał Broniszewski	1:54.612	+11.968	40
40	GT	57	(Japan) CarGuy	(Japan) Takeshi Kimura	1:54.870	+12.226	41
41	GT	77	(Japan) D'station Racing	(United Kingdom) Charlie Fagg	1:55.034	+12.390	42
42	GT	6	(Germany) Haupt Racing Team	(France) Michael Blanchemain	1:55.365	+12.721	43
43	GT	95	(United Kingdom) TF Sport	(United Kingdom) John Hartshorne	1:56.626	+13.982	44
44	LMP2	23	(United Kingdom) United Autosports	—			10 (Note: The No. 23 United Autosports was penalised for causing a red flag during qualifying session and lost all its laptimes. Stewards allowed car #23 to start the race from the back of its class.)
45	GT	67	(United Kingdom) Orange Racing Powered by JMH	—			— (Note: The No. 67 Orange Racing Powered by JMH was penalised for causing a red flag during qualifying session and lost all its laptimes. Stewards allowed car #67 to start the race from the back of the grid but it did not make it to the start.)

=== Race ===
==== Race result ====
The minimum number of laps for classification (70% of overall winning car's distance) was 70 laps. Class winners are marked in bold.

Final Classification
Pos	Class	No.	Team	Drivers	Car	Tyres	Laps	Time/Gap
1	**LMP2**	**37**	**(Switzerland) Cool Racing**	**(Switzerland) Alexandre Coigny (Denmark) Malthe Jakobsen**	**Oreca 07**	M	**100**	**4:03:13.317**
2	LMP2	23	(United Kingdom) United Autosports	(Australia) Yasser Shahin (Australia) Garnet Patterson (United Kingdom) Oliver Jarvis	Oreca 07	M	100	+34.394
3	LMP2	3	(Luxembourg) DKR Engineering	(Turkey) Salih Yoluç (United Kingdom) Charlie Eastwood (Turkey) Ayhancan Güven	Oreca 07	M	100	+40.730
4	LMP2	43	(Poland) Inter Europol Competition	(United States) Nolan Siegel (United States) Christian Bogle (United States) Charles Crews	Oreca 07	M	100	+1:02.636
5	LMP2	22	(United Kingdom) United Autosports	(United Kingdom) Philip Hanson (United Kingdom) Paul di Resta (United States) James McGuire	Oreca 07	M	100	+1:08.128 (Note: The No. 22 United Autosports was penalied for failing to complete mandatory pitstops in stipulated time. The penalty was stop & go converted to adding 35 seconds to crew's race time)
6	LMP2	24	(United Kingdom) Nielsen Racing	(United States) Rodrigo Sales (United Kingdom) Ben Hanley (Switzerland) Mathias Beche	Oreca 07	M	100	+1:27.377
7	LMP2	98	(United Kingdom) 99 Racing	(Switzerland) Neel Jani; Nikita Mazepin (Oman) Ahmad Al Harthy	Oreca 07	M	100	+1:29.559
8	LMP2	44	(Slovakia) ARC Bratislava	(Slovakia) Miro Konôpka (Chile) Nicolas Pino (Hungary) László Tóth	Oreca 07	M	98	+2 Laps
9	**LMP3**	**4**	**(United Kingdom) Nielsen Racing**	**(United Kingdom) Tony Wells (United Kingdom) Matthew Bell**	**Ligier JS P320**	M	**97**	**+3 Laps**
10	LMP2	25	(Portugal) Algarve Pro Racing	(United States) John Falb (Australia) James Allen (Barbados) Kyffin Simpson	Oreca 07	M	97	+3 Laps (Note: The No. 25 Algarve Pro Racing was penalied for failing to complete mandatory pitstops in stipulated time. The penalty was stop & go converted to adding 35 seconds to crew's race time)
11	LMP3	29	(France) MV2S Racing	(Switzerland) Jérôme de Sadeleer; Viacheslav Gutak (France) Fabien Lavergne	Ligier JS P320	M	97	+3 Laps
12	LMP3	11	(Germany) WTM by Rinaldi Racing	(Germany) Torsten Kratz (Germany) Leonard Weiss (Argentina) Nicolás Varrone	Duqueine M30 - D08	M	97	+3 Laps
13	LMP3	8	(France) Graff Racing	(France) Fabrice Rossello (Spain) Xavier Lloveras (France) François Hériau	Ligier JS P320	M	96	+4 Laps
14	LMP3	5	(Luxembourg) DKR Engineering	(Belgium) Tom van Rompuy (Germany) Valentino Catalano	Duqueine M30 - D08	M	96	+4 Laps
15	LMP3	17	(Switzerland) Cool Racing	(Switzerland) Cédric Oltramare (France) Adrien Chila (Argentina) Marcos Siebert	Ligier JS P320	M	96	+4 Laps
16	LMP3	9	(France) Graff Racing	(France) Eric Trouillet (Switzerland) Sébastien Page (Spain) Belén García	Ligier JS P320	M	96	+4 Laps
17	LMP3	1	(Spain) CD Sport	(Denmark) Michael Jensen (United Kingdom) Nick Adcock (Denmark) Valdemar Eriksen	Ligier JS P320	M	96	+4 Laps
18	LMP3	53	(Poland) Inter Europol Competition	(United Kingdom) Kai Askey (United States) Wyatt Brichacek (Portugal) Miguel Cristóvão	Ligier JS P320	M	95	+5 Laps
19	LMP3	73	(Poland) Inter Europol Competition	(Australia) John Corbett (Saint Kitts and Nevis) Alexander Bukhantsov (United Kingdom) James Winslow	Ligier JS P320	M	94	+6 Laps
20	**GT**	**7**	**(Oman) Haupt Racing Team**	**(Oman) Al Faisal Al Zubair (Germany) Luca Stolz (Austria) Martin Konrad**	**Mercedes AMG GT3**	M	**94**	**+6 Laps**
21	LMP3	15	(United Kingdom) RLR MSport	(Saint Kitts and Nevis) Amir Feyzulin (United States) Bijoy Garg (Australia) Andres Latorre Canon	Ligier JS P320	M	94	+6 Laps
22	GT	91	(Germany) Herberth Motorsport	(United Kingdom) Alex Malykhin (Germany) Joel Sturm (United Kingdom) Harry King	Porsche 911 GT3 R	M	94	+6 Laps
23	GT	19	(Germany) Leipert Motorsport	(Italy) Gabriel Rindone (New Zealand) Brendon Leitch (Italy) Marco Mapelli	Lamborghini Huracán GT3 Evo	M	94	+6 Laps
24	LMP3	63	(Poland) Inter Europol Competition	(Canada) Adam Ali (United States) John Schauerman (Canada) James Dayson	Ligier JS P320	M	93	+7 Laps
25	GT	34	(Germany) Walkenhorst Motorsport	(United States) Chandler Hull (Netherlands) Nicky Catsburg (United States) Thomas Merrill	BMW M4 GT3	M	93	+7 Laps
26	GT	95	(United Kingdom) TF Sport	(United Kingdom) John Hartshorne (Portugal) Henrique Chaves (United Kingdom) Jonathan Adam	Aston Martin Vantage AMR GT3	M	93	+7 Laps
27	GT	77	(Japan) D'station Racing	(Japan) Satoshi Hoshino (Japan) Tomonobu Fujii (United Kingdom) Charlie Fagg	Aston Martin Vantage AMR GT3	M	92	+8 Laps
28	GT	10	(Germany) GetSpeed Performance	(Italy) Raffaele Marciello (Germany) Fabian Schiller (Germany) Florian Scholze	Mercedes AMG GT3	M	92	+8 Laps
29	GT	33	(Germany) Herberth Motorsport	(Hong Kong) Antares Au (Germany) Alfred Renauer (Austria) Klaus Bachler	Porsche 911 GT3 R	M	92	+8 Laps
30	GT	20	(Germany) Herberth Motorsport	(Switzerland) Nicolas Leutwiler (Denmark) Mikkel Pedersen (Italy) Matteo Cairoli	Porsche 911 GT3 R	M	92	+8 Laps
31	GT	57	(Japan) CarGuy	(Japan) Takeshi Kimura (Denmark) Frederik Schandorff (Denmark) Mikkel Jensen	Ferrari 488 GT3 Evo 2020	M	92	+8 Laps
32	GT	59	(United Kingdom) Garage 59	(United Kingdom) Nick Halstead (Italy) Louis Prette (United Kingdom) Rob Bell	McLaren 720S GT3	M	92	+8 Laps
33	GT	16	(Germany) GetSpeed	(China) Bihuang Zhou (China) Wang Zhongwei (Switzerland) Alexandre Imperatori	Mercedes AMG GT3	M	91	+9 Laps
34	GT	6	(Germany) Haupt Racing Team	(India) Arjun Maini (United Kingdom) Frank Bird (France) Michael Blanchemain	Mercedes AMG GT3	M	88	+12 Laps
35	GT	72	(Chinese Taipei) HubAuto Racing	(Australia) Liam Talbot (France) Jules Gounon (United Kingdom) Ollie Millroy	Mercedes AMG GT3	M	94	+13 Laps (Note: The No. 72 HubAuto Racing was penalied for failing to fulfill minimum driving time by Liam Talbot. The penalty was deduction of 7 laps and adding 77.652 seconds to crew's race time)
NC	LMP3	2	(Spain) CD Sport	Vladislav Lomko (United Kingdom) James Sweetnam (France) Jacques Wolff	Ligier JS P320	M	65	Not classified
NC	GT	99	(Germany) Herberth Motorsport	(Germany) Ralf Bohn (Zimbabwe) Axcil Jefferies (Germany) Robert Renauer	Porsche 911 GT3 R	M	44	Not classified
NC	LMP3	55	(Germany) Rinaldi Racing	(United Kingdom) Lorcan Hanafin (Germany) Matthias Lüthen (Germany) Jonas Ried	Duqueine M30 - D08	M	37	Wheel
NC	LMP3	18	(United Kingdom) 360 Racing	(France) Frédéric Jousset (Mexico) Sebastián Álvarez (United Kingdom) Ross Kaiser	Ligier JS P320	M	35	Collision damage
NC	GT	88	(United Kingdom) Garage 59	(Sweden) Alexander West (Denmark) Benjamin Goethe (Germany) Marvin Kirchhöfer	McLaren 720S GT3	M	14	Puncture
NC	GT	60	(Denmark) Formula Racing	(Denmark) Johnny Laursen (Denmark) Conrad Laursen (Denmark) Nicklas Nielsen	Ferrari 488 GT3 Evo 2020	M	12	Crash
NC	GT	66	(Spain) Bullitt Racing	(France) Valentin Hasse-Clot (Germany) Jacob Riegel (Australia) Martin Berry	Aston Martin Vantage AMR GT3	M	1	Collision damage
NC	GT	21	(Italy) AF Corse	(Italy) Stefano Costantini (United States) Simon Mann (Spain) Miguel Molina	Ferrari 488 GT3 Evo 2020	M	0	Crash
DNS	GT	74	(Switzerland) Kessel Racing	(Poland) Michał Broniszewski (Italy) David Fumanelli (United Kingdom) Benjamin Barker	Ferrari 488 GT3 Evo 2020	M	0	Did not start (Note: The No. 74 Kessel Racing did not start the Race 1 due to a technical issue that occurred after the qualifying session.)
DNS	GT	67	(United Kingdom) Orange Racing Powered by JMH	(United Kingdom) Simon Orange (United Kingdom) Michael O'Brien (United Kingdom) Marcus Clutton	McLaren 720S GT3	M	0	Brakes

==== Statistics ====
===== Fastest lap =====
Class	Driver	Team	Time	Lap
LMP2	(Denmark) Malthe Jakobsen	(Switzerland) #37 Cool Racing	1:42.085	82
LMP3	(Argentina) Nicolás Varrone	(Germany) #11 WTM by Rinaldi Racing	1:48.871	97
GT	(Germany) Luca Stolz	(Oman) #7 Haupt Racing Team	1:53.074	45

== Race 2 ==
=== Qualifying ===
Pole position winners in each class are marked in bold.

Pos	Class	No.	Team	Driver	Time	Gap	Grid
1	**LMP2**	**98**	**(United Kingdom) 99 Racing**	**(Oman) Ahmad Al Harthy**	**1:43.003**	—	1
2	LMP2	24	(United Kingdom) Nielsen Racing	(United States) Rodrigo Sales	1:43.757	+0.754	2
3	LMP2	3	(Luxembourg) DKR Engineering	(Turkey) Salih Yoluç	1:43.834	+0.831	3
4	LMP2	25	(Portugal) Algarve Pro Racing	(United States) John Falb	1:44.159	+1.156	4
5	LMP2	37	(Switzerland) Cool Racing	(Switzerland) Alexandre Coigny	1:44.585	+1.582	5
6	LMP2	43	(Poland) Inter Europol Competition	(United States) Charles Crews	1:45.310	+2.307	6
7	LMP2	44	(Slovakia) ARC Bratislava	(Slovakia) Miro Konôpka	1:48.367	+5.364	7
8	**LMP3**	**11**	**(Germany) WTM by Rinaldi Racing**	**(Germany) Torsten Kratz**	**1:48.663**	**+5.660**	8
9	LMP2	22	(United Kingdom) United Autosports	(United States) James McGuire	1:49.281	+6.278	9
10	LMP3	73	(Poland) Inter Europol Competition	(Saint Kitts and Nevis) Alexander Bukhantsov	1:49.511	+6.508	11
11	LMP3	29	(France) MV2S Racing	(Switzerland) Jérôme de Sadeleer	1:49.556	+6.553	12
12	LMP3	4	(United Kingdom) Nielsen Racing	(United Kingdom) Tony Wells	1:49.858	+6.855	13
13	LMP3	55	(Germany) Rinaldi Racing	(Germany) Matthias Lüthen	1:49.873	+6.870	14
14	LMP3	17	(Switzerland) Cool Racing	(France) Adrien Chila	1:49.967	+6.964	15
15	LMP3	9	(France) Graff Racing	(France) Eric Trouillet	1:50.137	+7.134	16
16	LMP3	5	(Luxembourg) DKR Engineering	(Belgium) Tom van Rompuy	1:50.199	+7.196	17
17	LMP3	8	(France) Graff Racing	(France) François Hériau	1:50.407	+7.404	18
18	LMP3	2	(Spain) CD Sport	(United Kingdom) James Sweetnam	1:50.540	+7.537	19
19	LMP3	53	(Poland) Inter Europol Competition	(Portugal) Miguel Cristóvão	1:50.644	+7.641	20
20	LMP3	1	(Spain) CD Sport	(United Kingdom) Nick Adcock	1:50.778	+7.775	21
21	LMP3	15	(United Kingdom) RLR MSport	(Saint Kitts and Nevis) Amir Feyzulin	1:51.530	+8.527	22
22	**GT**	**72**	**(Chinese Taipei) HubAuto Racing**	**(Australia) Liam Talbot**	**1:52.885**	**+9.882**	23
23	LMP3	63	(Poland) Inter Europol Competition	(United States) John Schauerman	1:52.943	+9.940	24
24	GT	7	(Oman) Haupt Racing Team	(Austria) Martin Konrad	1:53.042	+10.039	25
25	GT	34	(Germany) Walkenhorst Motorsport	(United States) Thomas Merrill	1:53.155	+10.152	26
26	GT	21	(Italy) AF Corse	(Italy) Stefano Costantini	1:53.462	+10.459	27
27	GT	99	(Germany) Herberth Motorsport	(Germany) Ralf Bohn	1:53.554	+10.551	28
28	LMP3	18	(United Kingdom) 360 Racing	(France) Frédéric Jousset	1:53.710	+10.707	29
29	GT	10	(Germany) GetSpeed Performance	(Germany) Florian Scholze	1:53.739	+10.736	30
30	GT	16	(Germany) GetSpeed Performance	(China) Bihuang Zhou	1:53.994	+10.991	31
31	GT	91	(Germany) Herberth Motorsport	(United Kingdom) Alex Malykhin	1:54.021	+11.018	32
32	GT	66	(Spain) Bullitt Racing	(Australia) Martin Berry	1:54.034	+11.031	33
33	GT	60	(Denmark) Formula Racing	(Denmark) Johnny Laursen	1:54.190	+11.187	WD (Note: The No. 60 Formula Racing withdrew from Race 2 in consequence of a crash in Race 1.)
34	GT	88	(United Kingdom) Garage 59	(Sweden) Alexander West	1:54.225	+11.222	34
35	GT	19	(Germany) Leipert Motorsport	(Italy) Gabriel Rindone	1:54.308	+11.305	35
36	GT	33	(Germany) Herberth Motorsport	(Hong Kong) Antares Au	1:54.648	+11.645	36
37	GT	74	(Switzerland) Kessel Racing	(Poland) Michael Broniszewski	1:54.784	+11.781	WD (Note: The No. 74 Kessel Racing withdrew from Race 2 due to a technical issue that occurred after the qualifying session.)
38	GT	59	(United Kingdom) Garage 59	(United Kingdom) Nick Halstead	1:54.790	+11.787	37
39	GT	57	(Japan) CarGuy	(Japan) Takeshi Kimura	1:55.073	+12.070	38
40	GT	20	(Germany) Herberth Motorsport	(Switzerland) Nicolas Leutwiler	1:55.171	+12.168	39
41	GT	6	(Germany) Haupt Racing Team	(France) Michael Blanchemain	1:55.370	+12.367	40
42	GT	77	(Japan) D'station Racing	(Japan) Satoshi Hoshino	1:57.329	+14.326	41
43	GT	95	(United Kingdom) TF Sport	(United Kingdom) John Hartshorne	1:57.353	+14.350	42
44	LMP2	23	(United Kingdom) United Autosports	—			10 (Note: The No. 23 United Autosports was penalised for causing a red flag during qualifying session and lost all its laptimes. Stewards allowed car #23 to start from the back of the LMP2 grid.)
45	GT	67	(United Kingdom) Orange Racing Powered by JMH	—			WD (Note: The No. 67 Orange Racing Powered by JMH was penalised for causing a red flag during qualifying session and lost all its laptimes. The crew was withdrawn from Race 2 in consequence of a qualifying session crash.)

=== Race ===
==== Race result ====
The minimum number of laps for classification (70% of overall winning car's distance) was 91 laps. Class winners are marked in bold.

Final Classification
Pos	Class	No.	Team	Drivers	Car	Tyres	Laps	Time/Gap
1	**LMP2**	**3**	**(Luxembourg) DKR Engineering**	**(Turkey) Salih Yoluç (United Kingdom) Charlie Eastwood (Turkey) Ayhancan Güven**	**Oreca 07**	M	**130**	**4:02:36.303**
2	LMP2	98	(United Kingdom) 99 Racing	(Switzerland) Neel Jani; Nikita Mazepin (Oman) Ahmad Al Harthy	Oreca 07	M	130	+1.903
3	LMP2	37	(Switzerland) Cool Racing	(Switzerland) Alexandre Coigny (Denmark) Malthe Jakobsen	Oreca 07	M	130	+14.337
4	LMP2	25	(Portugal) Algarve Pro Racing	(United States) John Falb (Australia) James Allen (Barbados) Kyffin Simpson	Oreca 07	M	130	+44.907
5	LMP2	22	(United Kingdom) United Autosports	(United Kingdom) Philip Hanson (United Kingdom) Paul di Resta (United States) James McGuire	Oreca 07	M	129	+1 Lap
6	LMP2	23	(United Kingdom) United Autosports	(Australia) Yasser Shahin (Australia) Garnet Patterson (United Kingdom) Oliver Jarvis	Oreca 07	M	128	+2 Laps
7	LMP2	44	(Slovakia) ARC Bratislava	(Slovakia) Miro Konôpka (Chile) Nicolas Pino (Hungary) László Tóth	Oreca 07	M	127	+3 Laps
8	**LMP3**	**8**	**(France) Graff Racing**	**(France) Fabrice Rossello (Spain) Xavier Lloveras (France) François Hériau**	**Ligier JS P320**	M	**125**	**+5 Laps**
9	LMP3	17	(Switzerland) Cool Racing	(Switzerland) Cédric Oltramare (France) Adrien Chila (Argentina) Marcos Siebert	Ligier JS P320	M	124	+6 Laps
10	LMP3	29	(France) MV2S Racing	(Switzerland) Jérôme de Sadeleer; Viacheslav Gutak (France) Fabien Lavergne	Ligier JS P320	M	124	+6 Laps
11	LMP3	4	(United Kingdom) Nielsen Racing	(United Kingdom) Tony Wells (United Kingdom) Matthew Bell	Ligier JS P320	M	124	+6 Laps
12	LMP3	73	(Poland) Inter Europol Competition	(Australia) John Corbett (Saint Kitts and Nevis) Alexander Bukhantsov (United Kingdom) James Winslow	Ligier JS P320	M	124	+6 Laps
13	LMP3	53	(Poland) Inter Europol Competition	(United Kingdom) Kai Askey (United States) Wyatt Brichacek (Portugal) Miguel Cristóvão	Ligier JS P320	M	123	+7 Laps
14	LMP3	1	(Spain) CD Sport	(Denmark) Michael Jensen (United Kingdom) Nick Adcock (Denmark) Valdemar Eriksen	Ligier JS P320	M	123	+7 Laps
15	LMP3	18	(United Kingdom) 360 Racing	(France) Frédéric Jousset (Mexico) Sebastián Álvarez (United Kingdom) Ross Kaiser	Ligier JS P320	M	123	+7 Laps
16	LMP3	2	(Spain) CD Sport	Vladislav Lomko (United Kingdom) James Sweetnam (France) Jacques Wolff	Ligier JS P320	M	122	+8 Laps
17	**GT**	**7**	**(Oman) Haupt Racing Team**	**(Oman) Al Faisal Al Zubair (Germany) Luca Stolz (Austria) Martin Konrad**	**Mercedes AMG GT3**	M	**121**	**+9 Laps**
18	GT	34	(Germany) Walkenhorst Motorsport	(United States) Chandler Hull (Netherlands) Nicky Catsburg (United States) Thomas Merrill	BMW M4 GT3	M	121	+9 Laps
19	GT	19	(Germany) Leipert Motorsport	(Italy) Gabriel Rindone (New Zealand) Brendon Leitch (Italy) Marco Mapelli	Lamborghini Huracán GT3 Evo	M	121	+9 Laps
20	GT	20	(Germany) Herberth Motorsport	(Switzerland) Nicolas Leutwiler (Denmark) Mikkel Pedersen (Italy) Matteo Cairoli	Porsche 911 GT3 R	M	121	+9 Laps
21	GT	10	(Germany) GetSpeed Performance	(Italy) Raffaele Marciello (Germany) Fabian Schiller (Germany) Florian Scholze	Mercedes AMG GT3	M	121	+9 Laps (Note: The No. 10 GetSpeed was penalised for abusing track limits. The penalty was a drive through converted to 30 seconds time penalty.)
22	GT	72	(Chinese Taipei) HubAuto Racing	(Australia) Liam Talbot (France) Jules Gounon (United Kingdom) Ollie Millroy	Mercedes AMG GT3	M	121	+9 Laps (Note: The No. 72 HubAuto Racing was penalised for exceeding maximum stint time of Ollie Millroy by 62.651 seconds. The penalty was 97 seconds time penalty.)
23	LMP2	24	(United Kingdom) Nielsen Racing	(United States) Rodrigo Sales (United Kingdom) Ben Hanley (Switzerland) Mathias Beche	Oreca 07	M	120	+10 Laps
24	GT	21	(Italy) AF Corse	(Italy) Stefano Costantini (United States) Simon Mann (Spain) Miguel Molina	Ferrari 488 GT3 Evo 2020	M	120	+10 Laps
25	GT	88	(United Kingdom) Garage 59	(Sweden) Alexander West (Denmark) Benjamin Goethe (Germany) Marvin Kirchhöfer	McLaren 720S GT3	M	120	+10 Laps
26	GT	99	(Germany) Herberth Motorsport	(Germany) Ralf Bohn (Zimbabwe) Axcil Jefferies (Germany) Robert Renauer	Porsche 911 GT3 R	M	120	+10 Laps
27	GT	59	(United Kingdom) Garage 59	(United Kingdom) Nick Halstead (Italy) Louis Prette (United Kingdom) Rob Bell	McLaren 720S GT3	M	120	+10 Laps
28	GT	95	(United Kingdom) TF Sport	(United Kingdom) John Hartshorne (Portugal) Henrique Chaves (United Kingdom) Jonathan Adam	Aston Martin Vantage AMR GT3	M	120	+10 Laps
29	GT	33	(Germany) Herberth Motorsport	(Hong Kong) Antares Au (Germany) Alfred Renauer (Austria) Klaus Bachler	Porsche 911 GT3 R	M	120	+10 Laps
30	GT	66	(Spain) Bullitt Racing	(France) Valentin Hasse-Clot (Germany) Jacob Riegel (Australia) Martin Berry	Aston Martin Vantage AMR GT3	M	119	+11 Laps
31	GT	57	(Japan) CarGuy	(Japan) Takeshi Kimura (Denmark) Frederik Schandorff (Denmark) Mikkel Jensen	Ferrari 488 GT3 Evo 2020	M	119	+11 Laps
32	GT	91	(Germany) Herberth Motorsport	(United Kingdom) Alex Malykhin (Germany) Joel Sturm (United Kingdom) Harry King	Porsche 911 GT3 R	M	119	+11 Laps (Note: The No. 91 Herberth Motorsport was penalised for abusing track limits. The penalty was a drive through converted to 30 seconds time penalty.)
33	GT	16	(Germany) GetSpeed Performance	(China) Bihuang Zhou (China) Wang Zhongwei (Switzerland) Alexandre Imperatori	Mercedes AMG GT3	M	117	+13 Laps
34	LMP3	5	(Luxembourg) DKR Engineering	(Belgium) Tom van Rompuy (Germany) Valentino Catalano	Duqueine M30 - D08	M	115	+15 Laps
35	LMP3	63	(Poland) Inter Europol Competition	(Canada) Adam Ali (United States) John Schauerman (Canada) James Dayson	Ligier JS P320	M	103	+27 Laps
NC	LMP2	43	(Poland) Inter Europol Competition	(United States) Nolan Siegel (United States) Christian Bogle (United States) Charles Crews	Oreca 07	M	124	Gearbox
NC	LMP3	15	(United Kingdom) RLR MSport	(Saint Kitts and Nevis) Amir Feyzulin (United States) Bijoy Garg (Australia) Andres Latorre Canon	Ligier JS P320	M	107	Not classified
NC	GT	6	(Germany) Haupt Racing Team	(India) Arjun Maini (United Kingdom) Frank Bird (France) Michael Blanchemain	Mercedes AMG GT3	M	79	Not classified
NC	GT	77	(Japan) D'station Racing	(Japan) Satoshi Hoshino (Japan) Tomonobu Fujii (United Kingdom) Charlie Fagg	Aston Martin Vantage AMR GT3	M	65	Not classified
NC	LMP3	55	(Germany) Rinaldi Racing	(United Kingdom) Lorcan Hanafin (Germany) Matthias Lüthen (Germany) Jonas Ried	Duqueine M30 - D08	M	48	Not classified
NC	LMP3	9	(France) Graff Racing	(France) Eric Trouillet (Switzerland) Sébastien Page (Spain) Belén García	Ligier JS P320	M	47	Crash
NC	LMP3	11	(Germany) WTM by Rinaldi Racing	(Germany) Torsten Kratz (Germany) Leonard Weiss (Argentina) Nicolás Varrone	Duqueine M30 - D08	M	1	Collision damage

==== Statistics ====
===== Fastest lap =====
Class	Driver	Team	Time	Lap
LMP2	(United Kingdom) Paul di Resta	(United Kingdom) #22 United Autosports	1:42.139	6
LMP3	(United States) Wyatt Brichacek	(Poland) #53 Inter Europol Competition	1:49.221	73
GT	(Italy) Marco Mapelli	(Germany) #19 Leipert Motorsport	1:52.954	54
