= 2023 4 Hours of Dubai =

Endurance sportscar racing event

The Grand Prix layout of the Dubai Autodrome

The 2023 4 Hours of Dubai was an endurance sportscar racing event held between 10 and 12 February 2023, as the first and second round of 2023 Asian Le Mans Series season.

== Schedule ==
Date	Time (local: GST)	Event
Friday, 10 February	14:40	Free Practice 1
Friday, 10 February	17:40	Free Practice 2
Saturday, 11 February	11:45	Qualifying - GT
Saturday, 11 February	12:15	Qualifying - LMP2 and LMP3
Saturday, 11 February	16:45	Race 1
Sunday, 12 February	10:45	Warm-up
Sunday, 12 February	15:00	Race 2

== Free practice ==
- Only the fastest car in each class is shown.

Free Practice 1	Class	No.	Entrant	Time
Free Practice 1	LMP2	37	(Switzerland) Cool Racing	1:48.013
Free Practice 1	LMP3	17	(Switzerland) Cool Racing	1:54.380
Free Practice 1	GT	10	(Germany) GetSpeed Performance	1:57.277
Free Practice 2	Class	No.	Entrant	Time
Free Practice 2	LMP2	37	(Switzerland) Cool Racing	1:48.232
Free Practice 2	LMP3	5	(Luxembourg) DKR Engineering	1:54.677
Free Practice 2	GT	10	(Germany) GetSpeed Performance	1:58.105

== Race 1 ==
=== Qualifying ===
Pole position winners in each class are marked in bold.

Pos	Class	No.	Team	Driver	Time	Gap	Grid
1	**LMP2**	**43**	**(Poland) Inter Europol Competition**	**(United States) Charles Crews**	**1:48.580**	—	1
2	LMP2	3	(Luxembourg) DKR Engineering	(Turkey) Salih Yoluç	1:49.244	+0.664	2
3	LMP2	24	(United Kingdom) Nielsen Racing	(United States) Rodrigo Sales	1:49.870	+1.290	3
4	LMP2	23	(United Kingdom) United Autosports	(Australia) Yasser Shahin	1:50.029	+1.449	4
5	LMP2	37	(Switzerland) Cool Racing	(Switzerland) Alexandre Coigny	1:50.202	+1.622	5
6	LMP2	25	(Portugal) Algarve Pro Racing	(United States) John Falb	1:50.322	+1.742	6
7	LMP2	44	(Slovakia) ARC Bratislava	(Slovakia) Miro Konôpka	1:51.907	+3.327	7
8	LMP2	98	(United Kingdom) 99 Racing	(Portugal) Gonçalo Gomes	1:52.273	+3.693	8
9	**LMP3**	**11**	**(Germany) WTM by Rinaldi Racing**	**(Germany) Torsten Kratz**	**1:53.183**	**+4.603**	9
10	LMP3	1	(Spain) CD Sport	(United Kingdom) Nick Adcock	1:54.078	+5.498	10
11	LMP3	55	(Germany) Rinaldi Racing	(Germany) Matthias Lüthen	1:54.444	+5.864	11
12	LMP3	73	(Poland) Inter Europol Competition	(Saint Kitts and Nevis) Alexander Bukhantsov	1:54.450	+5.870	12
13	LMP3	29	(France) MV2S Racing	(Switzerland) Jérôme de Sadeleer	1:54.495	+5.915	13
14	LMP3	17	(Switzerland) Cool Racing	(France) Adrien Chila	1:54.592	+6.012	14
15	LMP3	4	(United Kingdom) Nielsen Racing	(United Kingdom) Tony Wells	1:55.376	+6.796	18 (Note: The No. 4 Nielsen Racing was penalised for causing a collision with car No. 18 during qualifying session. The penalty was a drop of 3 places on the grid.)
16	LMP3	5	(Luxembourg) DKR Engineering	(Belgium) Tom van Rompuy	1:55.383	+6.803	15
17	LMP3	53	(Poland) Inter Europol Competition	(Portugal) Miguel Cristóvão	1:55.484	+6.904	16
18	LMP3	8	(France) Graff Racing	(France) François Hériau	1:55.580	+7.000	17
19	LMP3	9	(France) Graff Racing	(France) Eric Trouillet	1:55.746	+7.166	19
20	LMP3	2	(Spain) CD Sport	(United Kingdom) James Sweetnam	1:56.062	+7.482	20
21	LMP3	15	(United Kingdom) RLR MSport	(Saint Kitts and Nevis) Amir Feyzulin	1:57.054	+8.474	21
22	LMP2	22	(United Kingdom) United Autosports	(United States) James McGuire	1:57.057	+8.477	22
23	**GT**	**34**	**(Germany) Walkenhorst Motorsport**	**(United States) Thomas Merrill**	**1:57.701**	**+9.121**	23
24	GT	7	(Oman) Haupt Racing Team	(Austria) Martin Konrad	1:58.016	+9.436	24
25	GT	21	(Italy) AF Corse	(Italy) Stefano Costantini	1:58.528	+9.948	25
26	GT	10	(Germany) GetSpeed Performance	(Germany) Florian Scholze	1:58.562	+9.982	26
27	LMP3	63	(Poland) Inter Europol Competition	(Canada) James Dayson	1:58.700	+10.120	27
28	GT	72	(Chinese Taipei) HubAuto Racing	(Australia) Liam Talbot	1:58.705	+10.125	28
29	GT	16	(Germany) GetSpeed Performance	(China) Bihuang Zhou	1:58.779	+10.199	29
30	GT	33	(Germany) Herberth Motorsport	(Hong Kong) Antares Au	1:58.992	+10.412	30
31	GT	77	(Japan) D'station Racing	(Japan) Satoshi Hoshino	1:59.140	+10.560	31
32	GT	99	(Germany) Herberth Motorsport	(Germany) Ralf Bohn	1:59.185	+10.605	32
33	GT	66	(Spain) Bullitt Racing	(Australia) Martin Berry	1:59.212	+10.632	33
34	GT	88	(United Kingdom) Garage 59	(Sweden) Alexander West	1:59.411	+10.831	34
35	GT	91	(Germany) Herberth Motorsport	(United Kingdom) Alex Malykhin	1:59.420	+10.840	35
36	GT	6	(Germany) Haupt Racing Team	(France) Michael Blanchemain	1:59.476	+10.896	36
37	GT	60	(Denmark) Formula Racing	(Denmark) Johnny Laursen	1:59.665	+11.085	37
38	GT	19	(Germany) Leipert Motorsport	(Italy) Gabriel Rindone	1:59.675	+11.095	38
39	GT	59	(United Kingdom) Garage 59	(United Kingdom) Nick Halstead	1:59.991	+11.411	39
40	GT	74	(Switzerland) Kessel Racing	(Poland) Michał Broniszewski	2:00.289	+11.709	40
41	GT	20	(Germany) Herberth Motorsport	(Switzerland) Nicolas Leutwiler	2:00.535	+11.955	41
42	GT	57	(Japan) CarGuy	(Japan) Takeshi Kimura	2:00.680	+12.100	42
43	GT	95	(United Kingdom) TF Sport	(United Kingdom) John Hartshorne	2:00.958	+12.378	43
44	GT	67	(United Kingdom) Orange Racing Powered by JMH	(United Kingdom) Simon Orange	2:01.501	+12.921	44
45	LMP3	18	(United Kingdom) 360 Racing	(France) Frédéric Jousset	2:03.034	+14.454	45
46	GT	65	(Malaysia) Viper Niza Racing	(Malaysia) Douglas Khoo	2:05.274	+16.694	46
47	GT	54	(Italy) Dinamic GT	—			—
48	GT	61	(United Kingdom) TF Sport	—			—

=== Race ===
==== Race result ====
The minimum number of laps for classification (70% of overall winning car's distance) was 82 laps. Class winners are marked in bold.

Final Classification
Pos	Class	No.	Team	Drivers	Car	Tyres	Laps	Time/Gap
1	**LMP2**	**25**	**(Portugal) Algarve Pro Racing**	**(Australia) James Allen (United States) John Falb (Barbados) Kyffin Simpson**	**Oreca 07**	M	**118**	**4:03:08.373**
2	LMP2	3	(Luxembourg) DKR Engineering	(Republic of Ireland) Charlie Eastwood (Turkey) Ayhancan Güven (Turkey) Salih Yoluc	Oreca 07	M	118	+9.054
3	LMP2	98	(United Kingdom) 99 Racing	(Portugal) Gonçalo Gomes (Switzerland) Neel Jani; Nikita Mazepin	Oreca 07	M	118	+9.391
4	LMP2	24	(United Kingdom) Nielsen Racing	(Switzerland) Mathias Beche (United Kingdom) Ben Hanley (United States) Rodrigo Sales	Oreca 07	M	118	+33.999
5	LMP2	22	(United Kingdom) United Autosports	(United Kingdom) Paul di Resta (United Kingdom) Philip Hanson (United States) James McGuire	Oreca 07	M	117	+1 Lap
6	LMP2	23	(United Kingdom) United Autosports	(United Kingdom) Oliver Jarvis (Australia) Garnet Patterson (Australia) Yasser Shahin	Oreca 07	M	117	+1 Lap
7	LMP2	44	(Slovakia) ARC Bratislava	(Slovakia) Miro Konôpka (Chile) Nicolas Pino (Hungary) László Tóth	Oreca 07	M	117	+1 Lap
8	LMP2	37	(Switzerland) Cool Racing	(Switzerland) Alexandre Coigny (Denmark) Malthe Jakobsen (France) Nicolas Lapierre	Oreca 07	M	115	+3 Laps
9	**LMP3**	**29**	**(France) MV2S Racing**	**(Switzerland) Jérôme de Sadeleer; Viacheslav Gutak (France) Fabien Lavergne**	**Ligier JS P320**	M	**114**	**+4 Laps**
10	LMP3	8	(France) Graff Racing	(France) Fabrice Rossello (Spain) Xavier Lloveras (France) François Heriau	Ligier JS P320	M	114	+4 Laps
11	LMP3	1	(Spain) CD Sport	(Denmark) Michael Jensen (United Kingdom) Nick Adcock (Denmark) Valdemar Eriksen	Ligier JS P320	M	113	+5 Laps
12	LMP3	55	(Germany) Rinaldi Racing	(United Kingdom) Lorcan Hanafin (Germany) Matthias Lüthen (Germany) Jonas Ried	Duqueine M30 - D08	M	113	+5 Laps
13	LMP3	73	(Poland) Inter Europol Competition	(Australia) John Corbett (Saint Kitts and Nevis) Alexander Bukhantsov (United Kingdom) James Winslow	Ligier JS P320	M	113	+5 Laps
14	LMP3	5	(Luxembourg) DKR Engineering	(Belgium) Tom van Rompuy (Germany) Valentino Catalano	Duqueine M30 - D08	M	113	+5 Laps
15	**GT**	**34**	**(Germany) Walkenhorst Motorsport**	**(United States) Chandler Hull (Netherlands) Nicky Catsburg (United States) Thomas Merrill**	**BMW M4 GT3**	M	**112**	**+6 Laps**
16	LMP3	2	(Spain) CD Sport	Vladislav Lomko (United Kingdom) James Sweetnam (France) Fabien Michal	Ligier JS P320	M	112	+6 Laps
17	GT	10	(Germany) GetSpeed Performance	(Italy) Raffaele Marciello (Germany) Fabian Schiller (Germany) Florian Scholze	Mercedes-AMG GT3 Evo	M	112	+6 Laps
18	GT	7	(Oman) Haupt Racing Team	(Oman) Al Faisal Al Zubair (Germany) Luca Stolz (Austria) Martin Konrad	Mercedes-AMG GT3 Evo	M	112	+6 Laps
19	LMP3	9	(France) Graff Racing	(France) Eric Trouillet (Switzerland) Sébastien Page (Spain) Belén García	Ligier JS P320	M	112	+6 Laps
20	GT	91	(Germany) Herberth Motorsport	(United Kingdom) Alex Malykhin (Germany) Joel Sturm (United Kingdom) Harry King	Porsche 911 GT3 R	M	112	+6 Laps
21	LMP3	53	(Poland) Inter Europol Competition	(United Kingdom) Kai Askey (United States) Wyatt Brichacek (Portugal) Miguel Cristóvão	Ligier JS P320	M	112	+6 Laps
22	LMP3	15	(United Kingdom) RLR MSport	(Saint Kitts and Nevis) Amir Feyzulin (United States) Bijoy Garg (Australia) Andres Latorre Canon	Ligier JS P320	M	112	+6 Laps
23	GT	20	(Germany) Herberth Motorsport	(Switzerland) Nicolas Leutwiler (Denmark) Mikkel Pedersen (Italy) Matteo Cairoli	Porsche 911 GT3 R	M	111	+7 Laps
24	GT	99	(Germany) Herberth Motorsport	(Germany) Ralf Bohn (Zimbabwe) Axcil Jefferies (Germany) Robert Renauer	Porsche 911 GT3 R	M	111	+7 Laps
25	GT	6	(Germany) Haupt Racing Team	(India) Arjun Maini (United Kingdom) Frank Bird (France) Michael Blanchemain	Mercedes-AMG GT3 Evo	M	111	+7 Laps
26	GT	60	(Denmark) Formula Racing	(Denmark) Johnny Laursen (Denmark) Conrad Laursen (Denmark) Nicklas Nielsen	Ferrari 488 GT3 Evo 2020	M	111	+7 Laps
27	GT	21	(Italy) AF Corse	(Italy) Stefano Costantini (United States) Simon Mann (Spain) Miguel Molina	Ferrari 488 GT3 Evo 2020	M	111	+7 Laps
28	GT	19	(Germany) Leipert Motorsport	(Italy) Gabriel Rindone (New Zealand) Brendon Leitch (Italy) Marco Mapelli	Lamborghini Huracán GT3 Evo	M	111	+7 Laps
29	GT	95	(United Kingdom) TF Sport	(United Kingdom) John Hartshorne (Portugal) Henrique Chaves (United Kingdom) Jonathan Adam	Aston Martin Vantage AMR GT3	M	110	+8 Laps
30	GT	59	(United Kingdom) Garage 59	(United Kingdom) Nick Halstead (Italy) Louis Prette (United Kingdom) Rob Bell	McLaren 720S GT3	M	110	+8 Laps
31	GT	77	(Japan) D'station Racing	(Japan) Satoshi Hoshino (Japan) Tomonobu Fujii (United Kingdom) Charlie Fagg	Aston Martin Vantage AMR GT3	M	110	+8 Laps
32	GT	57	(Japan) CarGuy	(Japan) Takeshi Kimura (Denmark) Frederik Schandorff (Denmark) Mikkel Jensen	Ferrari 488 GT3 Evo 2020	M	110	+8 Laps (Note: The No. 57 Car Guy Racing was penalised for exceeding driving time by Mikkel Jensen. The penalty was adding 36 seconds to crew's total race time.)
33	GT	88	(United Kingdom) Garage 59	(Sweden) Alexander West (Denmark) Benjamin Goethe (United Kingdom) Tom Gamble	McLaren 720S GT3	M	110	+8 Laps (Note: The No. 88 Garage 59 was penalised for exceeding driving time by Tom Gamble. The penalty was adding 87 seconds to crew's total race time.)
34	LMP3	63	(Poland) Inter Europol Competition	(Canada) Adam Ali (United States) John Schauerman (Canada) James Dayson	Ligier JS P320	M	109	+9 Laps
35	LMP3	18	(United Kingdom) 360 Racing	(France) Frédéric Jousset (Mexico) Sebastián Álvarez (United Kingdom) Ross Kaiser	Ligier JS P320	M	107	+11 Laps
36	LMP3	4	(United Kingdom) Nielsen Racing	(United Kingdom) Tony Wells (United Kingdom) Matthew Bell	Ligier JS P320	M	106	+12 Laps
37	GT	67	(United Kingdom) Orange Racing Powered by JMH	(United Kingdom) Simon Orange (United Kingdom) Michael O'Brien (United Kingdom) Marcus Clutton	McLaren 720S GT3	M	105	+13 Laps
38	LMP3	17	(Switzerland) Cool Racing	(Switzerland) Cédric Oltramare (France) Adrien Chila (Argentina) Marcos Siebert	Ligier JS P320	M	105	+13 Laps
39	GT	16	(Germany) GetSpeed Performance	(China) Bihuang Zhou (China) Wang Zhongwei (Switzerland) Alexandre Imperatori	Mercedes-AMG GT3 Evo	M	104	+14 Laps
NC	LMP2	43	(Poland) Inter Europol Competition	(United States) Nolan Siegel (United States) Christian Bogle (United States) Charles Crews	Oreca 07	M	102	Wheel bearing
NC	GT	33	(Germany) Herberth Motorsport	(Hong Kong) Antares Au (Germany) Alfred Renauer (Austria) Klaus Bachler	Porsche 911 GT3 R	M	90	Not classified
NC	GT	74	(Switzerland) Kessel Racing	(Poland) Michał Broniszewski (Italy) David Fumanelli (Brazil) Felipe Fraga	Ferrari 488 GT3 Evo 2020	M	75	Penalty (Note: The No. 74 Kessel Racing was penalised for exceeding driving time by David Fumanelli. The penalty was deduction of 35 laps.)
NC	GT	72	(Chinese Taipei) HubAuto Racing	(Australia) Liam Talbot (France) Jules Gounon (United Kingdom) Ollie Millroy	Mercedes-AMG GT3 Evo	M	72	Engine
NC	GT	65	(Malaysia) Viper Niza Racing	(Malaysia) Douglas Khoo (Malaysia) Dominic Ang	Aston Martin Vantage AMR GT3	M	72	Penalty (Note: The No. 65 Viper Niza Racing was penalised for exceeding driving time by Douglas Khoo. The penalty was deduction of 34 laps and adding 90 seconds to crew's total race time.)
NC	LMP3	11	(Germany) WTM by Rinaldi Racing	(Germany) Torsten Kratz (Germany) Leonard Weiss (Argentina) Nicolás Varrone	Duqueine M30 - D08	M	44	Gearbox
NC	GT	66	(Spain) Bullitt Racing	(France) Valentin Hasse-Clot (Germany) Jacob Riegel (Australia) Martin Berry	Aston Martin Vantage AMR GT3	M	4	Collision damage

==== Statistics ====
===== Fastest lap =====
Class	Driver	Team	Time	Lap
LMP2	(United States) Charles Crews	(Poland) #43 Inter Europol Competition	1:49.143	5
LMP3	(Germany) Torsten Kratz	(Germany) #11 WTM by Rinaldi Racing	1:55.426	5
GT	(Germany) Fabian Schiller	(Germany) #10 GetSpeed Performance	1:58.327	83

== Race 2 ==
=== Qualifying ===
Pole position winners in each class are marked in bold.

Pos	Class	No.	Team	Driver	Time	Gap	Grid
1	**LMP2**	**43**	**(Poland) Inter Europol Competition**	**(United States) Charles Crews**	**1:49.329**	—	1
2	LMP2	3	(Luxembourg) DKR Engineering	(Turkey) Salih Yoluç	1:49.816	+0.487	2
3	LMP2	23	(United Kingdom) United Autosports	(Australia) Yasser Shahin	1:50.233	+0.904	3
4	LMP2	24	(United Kingdom) Nielsen Racing	(United States) Rodrigo Sales	1:50.239	+0.910	4
5	LMP2	25	(Portugal) Algarve Pro Racing	(United States) John Falb	1:50.405	+1.076	5
6	LMP2	37	(Switzerland) Cool Racing	(Switzerland) Alexandre Coigny	1:51.014	+1.685	6
7	LMP2	44	(Slovakia) ARC Bratislava	(Slovakia) Miro Konôpka	1:51.960	+2.631	7
8	LMP2	98	(United Kingdom) 99 Racing	(Portugal) Gonçalo Gomes	1:53.000	+3.671	8
9	**LMP3**	**11**	**(Germany) WTM by Rinaldi Racing**	**(Germany) Torsten Kratz**	**1:53.509**	**+4.180**	9
10	LMP3	1	(Spain) CD Sport	(United Kingdom) Nick Adcock	1:54.225	+4.896	10
11	LMP3	73	(Poland) Inter Europol Competition	(Saint Kitts and Nevis) Alexander Bukhantsov	1:54.465	+5.136	11
12	LMP3	29	(France) MV2S Racing	(Switzerland) Jérôme de Sadeleer	1:54.583	+5.254	12
13	LMP3	17	(Switzerland) Cool Racing	(France) Adrien Chila	1:54.599	+5.270	13
14	LMP3	55	(Germany) Rinaldi Racing	(Germany) Matthias Lüthen	1:55.311	+5.982	14
15	LMP3	5	(Luxembourg) DKR Engineering	(Belgium) Tom van Rompuy	1:55.401	+6.072	15
16	LMP3	4	(United Kingdom) Nielsen Racing	(United Kingdom) Tony Wells	1:55.408	+6.079	16
17	LMP3	8	(France) Graff Racing	(France) François Hériau	1:55.582	+6.253	17
18	LMP3	53	(Poland) Inter Europol Competition	(Portugal) Miguel Cristóvão	1:55.647	+6.318	18
19	LMP3	9	(France) Graff Racing	(France) Eric Trouillet	1:56.459	+7.130	19
20	LMP2	22	(United Kingdom) United Autosports	(United States) James McGuire	1:57.081	+7.752	20
21	LMP3	15	(United Kingdom) RLR MSport	(Saint Kitts and Nevis) Amir Feyzulin	1:57.309	+7.980	21
22	LMP3	2	(Spain) CD Sport	(United Kingdom) James Sweetnam	1:58.089	+8.760	22
23	**GT**	**34**	**(Germany) Walkenhorst Motorsport**	**(United States) Thomas Merrill**	**1:58.107**	**+8.778**	23
24	GT	7	(Oman) Haupt Racing Team	(Austria) Martin Konrad	1:58.353	+9.024	24
25	GT	10	(Germany) GetSpeed Performance	(Germany) Florian Scholze	1:58.653	+9.324	25
26	GT	21	(Italy) AF Corse	(Italy) Stefano Costantini	1:58.699	+9.370	26
27	GT	72	(Chinese Taipei) HubAuto Racing	(Australia) Liam Talbot	1:58.747	+9.418	27
28	GT	33	(Germany) Herberth Motorsport	(Hong Kong) Antares Au	1:59.048	+9.719	28
29	GT	99	(Germany) Herberth Motorsport	(Germany) Ralf Bohn	1:59.467	+10.138	29
30	LMP3	63	(Poland) Inter Europol Competition	(Canada) James Dayson	1:59.648	+10.319	30
31	GT	77	(Japan) D'station Racing	(Japan) Satoshi Hoshino	1:59.689	+10.360	31
32	GT	88	(United Kingdom) Garage 59	(Sweden) Alexander West	1:59.697	+10.368	32
33	GT	6	(Germany) Haupt Racing Team	(France) Michael Blanchemain	1:59.705	+10.376	33
34	GT	91	(Germany) Herberth Motorsport	(United Kingdom) Alex Malykhin	1:59.711	+10.382	34
35	GT	16	(Germany) GetSpeed	(China) Bihuang Zhou	1:59.857	+10.528	35
36	GT	66	(Spain) Bullitt Racing	(Australia) Martin Berry	2:00.014	+10.685	36
37	GT	19	(Germany) Leipert Motorsport	(Italy) Gabriel Rindone	2:00.082	+10.753	37
38	GT	74	(Switzerland) Kessel Racing	(Poland) Michał Broniszewski	2:00.298	+10.969	38
39	GT	60	(Denmark) Formula Racing	(Denmark) Johnny Laursen	2:00.408	+11.079	39
40	GT	20	(Germany) Herberth Motorsport	(Switzerland) Nicolas Leutwiler	2:00.615	+11.286	40
41	GT	95	(United Kingdom) TF Sport	(United Kingdom) John Hartshorne	2:00.977	+11.648	41
42	GT	57	(Japan) CarGuy	(Japan) Takeshi Kimura	2:01.287	+11.958	42
43	GT	59	(United Kingdom) Garage 59	(United Kingdom) Nick Halstead	2:01.330	+12.001	43
44	GT	67	(United Kingdom) Orange Racing Powered by JMH	(United Kingdom) Simon Orange	2:01.649	+12.320	44
45	LMP3	18	(United Kingdom) 360 Racing	(France) Frédéric Jousset	2:03.957	+14.628	45
46	GT	65	(Malaysia) Viper Niza Racing	(Malaysia) Douglas Khoo	2:06.073	+16.744	46
47	GT	54	(Italy) Dinamic GT	—			—
48	GT	61	(United Kingdom) TF Sport	—			—

=== Race ===
==== Race result ====
The minimum number of laps for classification (70% of overall winning car's distance) was 80 laps. Class winners are marked in bold.

Final Classification
Pos	Class	No.	Team	Drivers	Car	Tyres	Laps	Time/Gap
1	**LMP2**	**43**	**(Poland) Inter Europol Competition**	**(United States) Nolan Siegel (United States) Christian Bogle (United States) Charles Crews**	**Oreca 07**	M	**115**	**4:03:13.787**
2	LMP2	3	(Luxembourg) DKR Engineering	(Republic of Ireland) Charlie Eastwood (Turkey) Ayhancan Güven (Turkey) Salih Yoluc	Oreca 07	M	115	+17.945
3	LMP2	24	(United Kingdom) Nielsen Racing	(Switzerland) Mathias Beche (United Kingdom) Ben Hanley (United States) Rodrigo Sales	Oreca 07	M	115	+19.900
4	LMP2	25	(Portugal) Algarve Pro Racing	(Australia) James Allen (United States) John Falb (Barbados) Kyffin Simpson	Oreca 07	M	115	+25.975
5	LMP2	37	(Switzerland) Cool Racing	(Switzerland) Alexandre Coigny (Denmark) Malthe Jakobsen (France) Nicolas Lapierre	Oreca 07	M	115	+26.353
6	LMP2	98	(United Kingdom) 99 Racing	(Portugal) Gonçalo Gomes (Switzerland) Neel Jani; Nikita Mazepin	Oreca 07	M	115	+38.887
7	LMP2	22	(United Kingdom) United Autosports	(United Kingdom) Paul di Resta (United Kingdom) Philip Hanson (United States) James McGuire	Oreca 07	M	114	+1 Lap
8	LMP2	23	(United Kingdom) United Autosports	(United Kingdom) Oliver Jarvis (Australia) Garnet Patterson (Australia) Yasser Shahin	Oreca 07	M	114	+1 Lap
9	LMP2	44	(Slovakia) ARC Bratislava	(Slovakia) Miro Konôpka (Chile) Nicolas Pino (Hungary) László Tóth	Oreca 07	M	113	+2 Laps
10	**LMP3**	**5**	**(Luxembourg) DKR Engineering**	**(Belgium) Tom van Rompuy (Germany) Valentino Catalano**	**Duqueine M30 - D08**	M	**112**	**+3 Laps**
11	LMP3	8	(France) Graff Racing	(France) Fabrice Rossello (Spain) Xavier Lloveras (France) François Hériau	Ligier JS P320	M	112	+3 Laps
12	LMP3	29	(France) MV2S Racing	(Switzerland) Jérôme de Sadeleer; Viacheslav Gutak (France) Fabien Lavergne	Ligier JS P320	M	112	+3 Laps
13	LMP3	11	(Germany) WTM by Rinaldi Racing	(Germany) Torsten Kratz (Germany) Leonard Weiss (Argentina) Nicolás Varrone	Duqueine M30 - D08	M	111	+4 Laps
14	LMP3	2	(Spain) CD Sport	Vladislav Lomko (United Kingdom) James Sweetnam (France) Fabien Michal	Ligier JS P320	M	111	+4 Laps
15	LMP3	4	(United Kingdom) Nielsen Racing	(United Kingdom) Tony Wells (United Kingdom) Matthew Bell	Ligier JS P320	M	111	+4 Laps
16	LMP3	73	(Poland) Inter Europol Competition	(Australia) John Corbett (Saint Kitts and Nevis) Alexander Bukhantsov (United Kingdom) James Winslow	Ligier JS P320	M	111	+4 Laps
17	LMP3	9	(France) Graff Racing	(France) Eric Trouillet (Switzerland) Sébastien Page (Spain) Belén García	Ligier JS P320	M	111	+4 Laps
18	LMP3	1	(Spain) CD Sport	(Denmark) Michael Jensen (United Kingdom) Nick Adcock (Denmark) Valdemar Eriksen	Ligier JS P320	M	111	+4 Laps
19	**GT**	**34**	**(Germany) Walkenhorst Motorsport**	**(United States) Chandler Hull (Netherlands) Nicky Catsburg (United States) Thomas Merrill**	**BMW M4 GT3**	M	**110**	**+5 Laps**
20	LMP3	15	(United Kingdom) RLR MSport	(Saint Kitts and Nevis) Amir Feyzulin (United States) Bijoy Garg (Australia) Andres Latorre Canon	Ligier JS P320	M	110	+5 Laps
21	GT	10	(Germany) GetSpeed Performance	(Italy) Raffaele Marciello (Germany) Fabian Schiller (Germany) Florian Scholze	Mercedes-AMG GT3 Evo	M	109	+6 Laps
22	GT	21	(Italy) AF Corse	(Italy) Stefano Costantini (United States) Simon Mann (Spain) Miguel Molina	Ferrari 488 GT3 Evo 2020	M	109	+6 Laps
23	GT	88	(United Kingdom) Garage 59	(Sweden) Alexander West (Denmark) Benjamin Goethe (United Kingdom) Tom Gamble	McLaren 720S GT3	M	109	+6 Laps
24	GT	59	(United Kingdom) Garage 59	(United Kingdom) Nick Halstead (Italy) Louis Prette (United Kingdom) Rob Bell	McLaren 720S GT3	M	109	+6 Laps
25	GT	77	(Japan) D'station Racing	(Japan) Satoshi Hoshino (Japan) Tomonobu Fujii (United Kingdom) Charlie Fagg	Aston Martin Vantage AMR GT3	M	109	+6 Laps
26	GT	7	(Oman) Haupt Racing Team	(Oman) Al Faisal Al Zubair (Germany) Luca Stolz (Austria) Martin Konrad	Mercedes-AMG GT3 Evo	M	109	+6 Laps
27	GT	99	(Germany) Herberth Motorsport	(Germany) Ralf Bohn (Zimbabwe) Axcil Jefferies (Germany) Robert Renauer	Porsche 911 GT3 R	M	108	+7 Laps
28	GT	72	(Chinese Taipei) HubAuto Racing	(Australia) Liam Talbot (France) Jules Gounon (United Kingdom) Ollie Millroy	Mercedes-AMG GT3 Evo	M	108	+7 Laps
29	LMP3	63	(Poland) Inter Europol Competition	(Canada) Adam Ali (United States) John Schauerman (Canada) James Dayson	Ligier JS P320	M	108	+7 Laps
30	GT	91	(Germany) Herberth Motorsport	(United Kingdom) Alex Malykhin (Germany) Joel Sturm (United Kingdom) Harry King	Porsche 911 GT3 R	M	108	+7 Laps
31	GT	33	(Germany) Herberth Motorsport	(Hong Kong) Antares Au (Germany) Alfred Renauer (Austria) Klaus Bachler	Porsche 911 GT3 R	M	108	+7 Laps
32	GT	19	(Germany) Leipert Motorsport	(Italy) Gabriel Rindone (New Zealand) Brendon Leitch (Italy) Marco Mapelli	Lamborghini Huracán GT3 Evo	M	108	+7 Laps
33	GT	74	(Switzerland) Kessel Racing	(Poland) Michał Broniszewski (Italy) David Fumanelli (United Kingdom) Benjamin Barker	Ferrari 488 GT3 Evo 2020	M	108	+7 Laps
34	GT	95	(United Kingdom) TF Sport	(United Kingdom) John Hartshorne (Portugal) Henrique Chaves (United Kingdom) Jonathan Adam	Aston Martin Vantage AMR GT3	M	107	+8 Laps
35	GT	6	(Germany) Haupt Racing Team	(India) Arjun Maini (United Kingdom) Frank Bird (France) Michael Blanchemain	Mercedes-AMG GT3 Evo	M	107	+8 Laps
36	GT	20	(Germany) Herberth Motorsport	(Switzerland) Nicolas Leutwiler (Denmark) Mikkel Pedersen (Italy) Matteo Cairoli	Porsche 911 GT3 R	M	107	+8 Laps
37	GT	66	(Spain) Bullitt Racing	(France) Valentin Hasse-Clot (Germany) Jacob Riegel (Australia) Martin Berry	Aston Martin Vantage AMR GT3	M	107	+8 Laps
38	GT	67	(United Kingdom) Orange Racing Powered by JMH	(United Kingdom) Simon Orange (United Kingdom) Michael O'Brien (United Kingdom) Marcus Clutton	McLaren 720S GT3	M	106	+9 Laps
39	GT	16	(Germany) GetSpeed Performance	(China) Bihuang Zhou (China) Wang Zhongwei (Switzerland) Alexandre Imperatori	Mercedes-AMG GT3 Evo	M	105	+10 Laps
NC	LMP3	53	(Poland) Inter Europol Competition	(United Kingdom) Kai Askey (United States) Wyatt Brichacek (Portugal) Miguel Cristóvão	Ligier JS P320	M	84	Not classified
NC	GT	60	(Denmark) Formula Racing	(Denmark) Johnny Laursen (Denmark) Conrad Laursen (Denmark) Nicklas Nielsen	Ferrari 488 GT3 Evo 2020	M	80	Not classified
NC	LMP3	18	(United Kingdom) 360 Racing	(France) Frédéric Jousset (Mexico) Sebastián Álvarez (United Kingdom) Ross Kaiser	Ligier JS P320	M	74	Not classified
NC	GT	65	(Malaysia) Viper Niza Racing	(Malaysia) Douglas Khoo (Malaysia) Dominic Ang	Aston Martin Vantage AMR GT3	M	66	Crash
NC	GT	57	(Japan) CarGuy	(Japan) Takeshi Kimura (Denmark) Frederik Schandorff (Denmark) Mikkel Jensen	Ferrari 488 GT3 Evo 2020	M	57	Not classified
NC	LMP3	55	(Germany) Rinaldi Racing	(United Kingdom) Lorcan Hanafin (Germany) Matthias Lüthen (Germany) Jonas Ried	Duqueine M30 - D08	M	54	Electrics
NC	LMP3	17	(Switzerland) Cool Racing	(Switzerland) Cédric Oltramare (France) Adrien Chila (Argentina) Marcos Siebert	Ligier JS P320	M	36	Crash

==== Statistics ====
===== Fastest lap =====
Class	Driver	Team	Time	Lap
LMP2	(Denmark) Malthe Jakobsen	(Switzerland) #37 Cool Racing	1:47.950	92
LMP3	Vladislav Lomko	(Spain) #2 CD Sport	1:54.912	68
GT	(United Kingdom) Michael O'Brien	(United Kingdom) #67 Orange Racing Powered by JMH	1:58.643	78
