= 2023 Asian Le Mans Series =

Sports car racing series

The 2023 Asian Le Mans Series was the eleventh season of the Automobile Club de l'Ouest's Asian Le Mans Series. It is the fourth 24 Hours of Le Mans-based series created by the ACO, following the American Le Mans Series (since merged with the Rolex Sports Car Series to form the United SportsCar Championship), the European Le Mans Series and the FIA World Endurance Championship. The four-event season began at the Dubai Autodrome in Dubai on 11 February 2023 and ended at the Yas Marina Circuit in Abu Dhabi on 19 February 2023.

For the first time, a bronze-rated driver is mandatory in each class and only the bronze drivers can participate in qualifying, hence the LMP2 Am and GT Am subclasses would officially be dropped for this season.

== Calendar ==
The calendar for the 2023 season was announced on the official website 25 May 2022. This Asian Le Mans Series season will once again run in its entirety in the Middle East, in the United Arab Emirates at the Dubai Autodrome in Dubai and Yas Marina Circuit in Abu Dhabi in February 2023, due to the significant freight issues.

The season will continue to comprise four four-hour length races, run on the two circuits.

Rnd	Race	Circuit	Location	Date
1	4 Hours of Dubai	(United Arab Emirates) Dubai Autodrome	Dubailand, Dubai, UAE	11 February 2023
2	4 Hours of Dubai	(United Arab Emirates) Dubai Autodrome	Dubailand, Dubai, UAE	12 February 2023
3	4 Hours of Abu Dhabi	(United Arab Emirates) Yas Marina Circuit	Yas Island, Abu Dhabi, UAE	18 February 2023
4	4 Hours of Abu Dhabi	(United Arab Emirates) Yas Marina Circuit	Yas Island, Abu Dhabi, UAE	19 February 2023

== Entry list ==
=== LMP2 ===
All cars in the LMP2 class use the Gibson GK428 V8 engine and Michelin tyres.

Entrant/Team	Car	No.	Drivers	Rounds
(Luxembourg) DKR Engineering	Oreca 07	3	(Republic of Ireland) Charlie Eastwood	All
(Luxembourg) DKR Engineering	Oreca 07	3	(Turkey) Ayhancan Güven	All
(Luxembourg) DKR Engineering	Oreca 07	3	(Turkey) Salih Yoluç	All
(United Kingdom) United Autosports	Oreca 07	22	(United Kingdom) Paul di Resta	All
(United Kingdom) United Autosports	Oreca 07	22	(United Kingdom) Philip Hanson	All
(United Kingdom) United Autosports	Oreca 07	22	(United States) James McGuire	All
(United Kingdom) United Autosports	Oreca 07	23	(United Kingdom) Oliver Jarvis	All
(United Kingdom) United Autosports	Oreca 07	23	(Australia) Garnet Patterson	All
(United Kingdom) United Autosports	Oreca 07	23	(Australia) Yasser Shahin	All
(United Kingdom) Nielsen Racing	Oreca 07	24	(Switzerland) Mathias Beche	All
(United Kingdom) Nielsen Racing	Oreca 07	24	(United Kingdom) Ben Hanley	All
(United Kingdom) Nielsen Racing	Oreca 07	24	(United States) Rodrigo Sales	All
(Portugal) Algarve Pro Racing	Oreca 07	25	(Australia) James Allen	All
(Portugal) Algarve Pro Racing	Oreca 07	25	(United States) John Falb	All
(Portugal) Algarve Pro Racing	Oreca 07	25	(Barbados) Kyffin Simpson	All
(Switzerland) Cool Racing	Oreca 07	37	(Switzerland) Alexandre Coigny	All
(Switzerland) Cool Racing	Oreca 07	37	(Denmark) Malthe Jakobsen	All
(Switzerland) Cool Racing	Oreca 07	37	(France) Nicolas Lapierre	1–2
(Poland) Inter Europol Competition	Oreca 07	43	(United States) Christian Bogle	All
(Poland) Inter Europol Competition	Oreca 07	43	(United States) Charles Crews	All
(Poland) Inter Europol Competition	Oreca 07	43	(United States) Nolan Siegel	All
(Slovakia) ARC Bratislava	Oreca 07	44	(Slovakia) Miro Konôpka	All
(Slovakia) ARC Bratislava	Oreca 07	44	(Chile) Nico Pino	All
(Slovakia) ARC Bratislava	Oreca 07	44	(Hungary) László Tóth	All
(United Kingdom) 99 Racing	Oreca 07	98	(Switzerland) Neel Jani	All
(United Kingdom) 99 Racing	Oreca 07	98	Nikita Mazepin (Note: Gutak, Lomko and Mazepin are Russian, but they compete as neutral competitors as Russian national emblems were banned by the FIA due to the Russian invasion of Ukraine. Bukhantsov and Feyzulin, also Russians, compete under a Kittitian licence for the same reason.)	All
(United Kingdom) 99 Racing	Oreca 07	98	(Portugal) Gonçalo Gomes	1–2
(United Kingdom) 99 Racing	Oreca 07	98	(Oman) Ahmad Al Harthy	3–4

Notes:

- Ben Barnicoat was scheduled to compete for 99 Racing, but withdrew prior to the start of the season. He was replaced by Neel Jani. The team's nominated bronze-rated driver, Félix Porteiro, also had to withdraw after he was retroactively reclassified as silver shortly before the event. Warren Hughes was initially called up to replace the Spaniard, but a documentation issue for the Briton resulted in Gonçalo Gomes eventually being drafted in. Gomes was later replaced with Ahmad Al Harthy for rounds 3 and 4.

=== LMP3 ===
All cars in the LMP3 class use the Nissan VK56DE 5.6 L V8 engine and Michelin tyres.

Entrant/Team	Car	No.	Drivers	Rounds
(Spain) CD Sport	Ligier JS P320	1	(United Kingdom) Nick Adcock	All
(Spain) CD Sport	Ligier JS P320	1	(Denmark) Valdemar Eriksen	All
(Spain) CD Sport	Ligier JS P320	1	(Denmark) Michael Jensen	All
(Spain) CD Sport	Ligier JS P320	2	Vladislav Lomko	All
(Spain) CD Sport	Ligier JS P320	2	(United Kingdom) James Sweetnam	All
(Spain) CD Sport	Ligier JS P320	2	(France) Fabien Michal	1–2
(Spain) CD Sport	Ligier JS P320	2	(France) Jacques Wolff	3–4
(United Kingdom) Nielsen Racing	Ligier JS P320	4	(United Kingdom) Matt Bell	All
(United Kingdom) Nielsen Racing	Ligier JS P320	4	(United Kingdom) Tony Wells	All
(Luxembourg) DKR Engineering	Duqueine M30 - D08	5	(Germany) Valentino Catalano	All
(Luxembourg) DKR Engineering	Duqueine M30 - D08	5	(Belgium) Tom Van Rompuy	All
(France) Graff Racing	Ligier JS P320	8	(France) François Hériau	All
(France) Graff Racing	Ligier JS P320	8	(Spain) Xavier Lloveras	All
(France) Graff Racing	Ligier JS P320	8	(France) Fabrice Rossello	All
(France) Graff Racing	Ligier JS P320	9	(Spain) Belén García	All
(France) Graff Racing	Ligier JS P320	9	(Switzerland) Sébastien Page	All
(France) Graff Racing	Ligier JS P320	9	(France) Eric Trouillet	All
(Germany) WTM by Rinaldi Racing	Duqueine M30 - D08	11	(Germany) Torsten Kratz	All
(Germany) WTM by Rinaldi Racing	Duqueine M30 - D08	11	(Germany) Leonard Weiss	All
(Germany) WTM by Rinaldi Racing	Duqueine M30 - D08	11	(Argentina) Nicolás Varrone	All
(Germany) Rinaldi Racing	Duqueine M30 - D08	55	(United Kingdom) Lorcan Hanafin	All
(Germany) Rinaldi Racing	Duqueine M30 - D08	55	(Germany) Matthias Lüthen	All
(Germany) Rinaldi Racing	Duqueine M30 - D08	55	(Germany) Jonas Ried	All
(United Kingdom) RLR MSport	Ligier JS P320	15	(Saint Kitts and Nevis) Amir Feyzulin	All
(United Kingdom) RLR MSport	Ligier JS P320	15	(United States) Bijoy Garg	All
(United Kingdom) RLR MSport	Ligier JS P320	15	(Australia) Andres Latorre Canon	All
(Switzerland) Cool Racing	Ligier JS P320	17	(France) Adrien Chila	All
(Switzerland) Cool Racing	Ligier JS P320	17	(Switzerland) Cédric Oltramare	All
(Switzerland) Cool Racing	Ligier JS P320	17	(Argentina) Marcos Siebert	All
(United Kingdom) 360 Racing	Ligier JS P320	18	(Mexico) Sebastián Álvarez	All
(United Kingdom) 360 Racing	Ligier JS P320	18	(France) Frédéric Jousset	All
(United Kingdom) 360 Racing	Ligier JS P320	18	(United Kingdom) Ross Kaiser	All
(France) MV2S Racing	Ligier JS P320	29	(Switzerland) Jérôme de Sadeleer	All
(France) MV2S Racing	Ligier JS P320	29	Vyacheslav Gutak	All
(France) MV2S Racing	Ligier JS P320	29	(France) Fabien Lavergne	All
(Poland) Inter Europol Competition	Ligier JS P320	53	(United Kingdom) Kai Askey	All
(Poland) Inter Europol Competition	Ligier JS P320	53	(United States) Wyatt Brichacek	All
(Poland) Inter Europol Competition	Ligier JS P320	53	(Portugal) Miguel Cristóvão	All
(Poland) Inter Europol Competition	Ligier JS P320	63	(Canada) Adam Ali	All
(Poland) Inter Europol Competition	Ligier JS P320	63	(Canada) James Dayson	All
(Poland) Inter Europol Competition	Ligier JS P320	63	(United States) John Schauerman	All
(Poland) Inter Europol Competition	Ligier JS P320	73	(Saint Kitts and Nevis) Alexander Bukhantsov	All
(Poland) Inter Europol Competition	Ligier JS P320	73	(Australia) John Corbett	All
(Poland) Inter Europol Competition	Ligier JS P320	73	(United Kingdom) James Winslow	All

=== GT ===
Entrant/Team	Car	Engine	No.	Drivers	Rounds
(Germany) (Oman) / Haupt Racing Team (Note: Both cars entered as Haupt Racing Team. However, Car No. 6 will run under a German licence and car No. 7 will run under an Omani licence.)	Mercedes-AMG GT3 Evo	Mercedes-AMG M159 6.2 L V8	6	(United Kingdom) Frank Bird	All
(Germany) (Oman) / Haupt Racing Team	Mercedes-AMG GT3 Evo	Mercedes-AMG M159 6.2 L V8	6	(France) Michael Blanchemain	All
(Germany) (Oman) / Haupt Racing Team	Mercedes-AMG GT3 Evo	Mercedes-AMG M159 6.2 L V8	6	(India) Arjun Maini	All
(Germany) (Oman) / Haupt Racing Team	Mercedes-AMG GT3 Evo	Mercedes-AMG M159 6.2 L V8	7	(Oman) Al Faisal Al Zubair	All
(Germany) (Oman) / Haupt Racing Team	Mercedes-AMG GT3 Evo	Mercedes-AMG M159 6.2 L V8	7	(Austria) Martin Konrad	All
(Germany) (Oman) / Haupt Racing Team	Mercedes-AMG GT3 Evo	Mercedes-AMG M159 6.2 L V8	7	(Germany) Luca Stolz	All
(Germany) GetSpeed Performance	Mercedes-AMG GT3 Evo	Mercedes-AMG M159 6.2 L V8	10	(Switzerland) Raffaele Marciello	All
(Germany) GetSpeed Performance	Mercedes-AMG GT3 Evo	Mercedes-AMG M159 6.2 L V8	10	(Germany) Fabian Schiller	All
(Germany) GetSpeed Performance	Mercedes-AMG GT3 Evo	Mercedes-AMG M159 6.2 L V8	10	(Germany) Florian Scholze	All
(Germany) GetSpeed Performance	Mercedes-AMG GT3 Evo	Mercedes-AMG M159 6.2 L V8	16	(China) Zhou Bihuang	All
(Germany) GetSpeed Performance	Mercedes-AMG GT3 Evo	Mercedes-AMG M159 6.2 L V8	16	(Switzerland) Alexandre Imperatori	All
(Germany) GetSpeed Performance	Mercedes-AMG GT3 Evo	Mercedes-AMG M159 6.2 L V8	16	(China) Wang Zhongwei	All
(Germany) Leipert Motorsport	Lamborghini Huracán GT3 Evo	Lamborghini 5.2 L V10	19	(New Zealand) Brendon Leitch	All
(Germany) Leipert Motorsport	Lamborghini Huracán GT3 Evo	Lamborghini 5.2 L V10	19	(Italy) Marco Mapelli	All
(Germany) Leipert Motorsport	Lamborghini Huracán GT3 Evo	Lamborghini 5.2 L V10	19	(Luxembourg) Gabriel Rindone	All
(Germany) Herberth Motorsport	Porsche 911 GT3 R	Porsche 4.0 L Flat-6	20	(Italy) Matteo Cairoli	All
(Germany) Herberth Motorsport	Porsche 911 GT3 R	Porsche 4.0 L Flat-6	20	(Switzerland) Nicolas Leutwiler	All
(Germany) Herberth Motorsport	Porsche 911 GT3 R	Porsche 4.0 L Flat-6	20	(Denmark) Mikkel O. Pedersen	All
(Germany) Herberth Motorsport	Porsche 911 GT3 R	Porsche 4.0 L Flat-6	33	(Hong Kong) Antares Au	All
(Germany) Herberth Motorsport	Porsche 911 GT3 R	Porsche 4.0 L Flat-6	33	(Austria) Klaus Bachler	All
(Germany) Herberth Motorsport	Porsche 911 GT3 R	Porsche 4.0 L Flat-6	33	(Germany) Alfred Renauer	All
(Germany) Herberth Motorsport	Porsche 911 GT3 R	Porsche 4.0 L Flat-6	91	(United Kingdom) Harry King	All
(Germany) Herberth Motorsport	Porsche 911 GT3 R	Porsche 4.0 L Flat-6	91	(United Kingdom) Alex Malykhin (Note: Malykhin is Belarusian, but he competes under a British license as Belarusian national emblems were banned by the FIA following the Russian invasion of Ukraine.)	All
(Germany) Herberth Motorsport	Porsche 911 GT3 R	Porsche 4.0 L Flat-6	91	(Germany) Joel Sturm	All
(Germany) Herberth Motorsport	Porsche 911 GT3 R	Porsche 4.0 L Flat-6	99	(Germany) Ralf Bohn	All
(Germany) Herberth Motorsport	Porsche 911 GT3 R	Porsche 4.0 L Flat-6	99	(Zimbabwe) Axcil Jefferies	All
(Germany) Herberth Motorsport	Porsche 911 GT3 R	Porsche 4.0 L Flat-6	99	(Germany) Robert Renauer	All
(Italy) AF Corse	Ferrari 488 GT3 Evo 2020	Ferrari F154CB 3.9 L Turbo V8	21	(Italy) Stefano Costantini	All
(Italy) AF Corse	Ferrari 488 GT3 Evo 2020	Ferrari F154CB 3.9 L Turbo V8	21	(United Kingdom) Simon Mann	All
(Italy) AF Corse	Ferrari 488 GT3 Evo 2020	Ferrari F154CB 3.9 L Turbo V8	21	(Spain) Miguel Molina	All
(Denmark) Formula Racing	Ferrari 488 GT3 Evo 2020	Ferrari F154CB 3.9 L Turbo V8	60	(Denmark) Conrad Laursen	All
(Denmark) Formula Racing	Ferrari 488 GT3 Evo 2020	Ferrari F154CB 3.9 L Turbo V8	60	(Denmark) Johnny Laursen	All
(Denmark) Formula Racing	Ferrari 488 GT3 Evo 2020	Ferrari F154CB 3.9 L Turbo V8	60	(Denmark) Nicklas Nielsen	All
(Germany) Walkenhorst Motorsport	BMW M4 GT3	BMW S58B30T0 3.0 L Turbo I6	34	(Netherlands) Nicky Catsburg	All
(Germany) Walkenhorst Motorsport	BMW M4 GT3	BMW S58B30T0 3.0 L Turbo I6	34	(United States) Chandler Hull	All
(Germany) Walkenhorst Motorsport	BMW M4 GT3	BMW S58B30T0 3.0 L Turbo I6	34	(United States) Thomas Merrill	All
(Italy) Dinamic GT	Porsche 911 GT3 R	Porsche 4.0 L Flat-6	54	(United Kingdom) Ben Barker	1–2
(Italy) Dinamic GT	Porsche 911 GT3 R	Porsche 4.0 L Flat-6	54	(Austria) Philipp Sager	1–2
(Italy) Dinamic GT	Porsche 911 GT3 R	Porsche 4.0 L Flat-6	54	(Austria) Christopher Zöchling	1–2
(Japan) Car Guy Racing	Ferrari 488 GT3 Evo 2020	Ferrari F154CB 3.9 L Turbo V8	57	(Denmark) Mikkel Jensen	All
(Japan) Car Guy Racing	Ferrari 488 GT3 Evo 2020	Ferrari F154CB 3.9 L Turbo V8	57	(Japan) Takeshi Kimura	All
(Japan) Car Guy Racing	Ferrari 488 GT3 Evo 2020	Ferrari F154CB 3.9 L Turbo V8	57	(Denmark) Frederik Schandorff	All
(Switzerland) Kessel Racing	Ferrari 488 GT3 Evo 2020	Ferrari F154CB 3.9 L Turbo V8	74	(Poland) Michał Broniszewski	All
(Switzerland) Kessel Racing	Ferrari 488 GT3 Evo 2020	Ferrari F154CB 3.9 L Turbo V8	74	(Italy) David Fumanelli	All
(Switzerland) Kessel Racing	Ferrari 488 GT3 Evo 2020	Ferrari F154CB 3.9 L Turbo V8	74	(Brazil) Felipe Fraga	1–2
(Switzerland) Kessel Racing	Ferrari 488 GT3 Evo 2020	Ferrari F154CB 3.9 L Turbo V8	74	(United Kingdom) Ben Barker	2–4 (Note: Felipe Fraga withdrew from round 1 shortly before the race after suffering a muscle strain in his back. Ben Barker, who had initially been entered in the also-withdrawn #54 Dinamic GT Porsche, was drafted in for round 2 to replace Fraga. Barker remained with the team in rounds 3 and 4.)
(United Kingdom) Garage 59	McLaren 720S GT3	McLaren M840T 4.0 L Turbo V8	59	(United Kingdom) Rob Bell	All
(United Kingdom) Garage 59	McLaren 720S GT3	McLaren M840T 4.0 L Turbo V8	59	(United Kingdom) Nick Halstead	All
(United Kingdom) Garage 59	McLaren 720S GT3	McLaren M840T 4.0 L Turbo V8	59	(Monaco) Louis Prette	All
(United Kingdom) Garage 59	McLaren 720S GT3	McLaren M840T 4.0 L Turbo V8	88	(Denmark) Benjamin Goethe	All
(United Kingdom) Garage 59	McLaren 720S GT3	McLaren M840T 4.0 L Turbo V8	88	(Sweden) Alexander West	All
(United Kingdom) Garage 59	McLaren 720S GT3	McLaren M840T 4.0 L Turbo V8	88	(United Kingdom) Tom Gamble	1–2
(United Kingdom) Garage 59	McLaren 720S GT3	McLaren M840T 4.0 L Turbo V8	88	(Germany) Marvin Kirchhöfer	3–4
(United Kingdom) TF Sport	Aston Martin Vantage AMR GT3	Aston Martin 4.0 L Turbo V8	61	(Malaysia) Adrian Henry D'Silva	1–2
(United Kingdom) TF Sport	Aston Martin Vantage AMR GT3	Aston Martin 4.0 L Turbo V8	61	(United Kingdom) Ross Gunn	1–2
(United Kingdom) TF Sport	Aston Martin Vantage AMR GT3	Aston Martin 4.0 L Turbo V8	61	(Hong Kong) David Pun	1–2
(United Kingdom) TF Sport	Aston Martin Vantage AMR GT3	Aston Martin 4.0 L Turbo V8	95	(United Kingdom) Jonathan Adam	All
(United Kingdom) TF Sport	Aston Martin Vantage AMR GT3	Aston Martin 4.0 L Turbo V8	95	(Portugal) Henrique Chaves	All
(United Kingdom) TF Sport	Aston Martin Vantage AMR GT3	Aston Martin 4.0 L Turbo V8	95	(United Kingdom) John Hartshorne	All
(Japan) D'station Racing	Aston Martin Vantage AMR GT3	Aston Martin 4.0 L Turbo V8	77	(United Kingdom) Charlie Fagg	All
(Japan) D'station Racing	Aston Martin Vantage AMR GT3	Aston Martin 4.0 L Turbo V8	77	(Japan) Tomonobu Fujii	All
(Japan) D'station Racing	Aston Martin Vantage AMR GT3	Aston Martin 4.0 L Turbo V8	77	(Japan) Satoshi Hoshino	All
(Malaysia) Viper Niza Racing	Aston Martin Vantage AMR GT3	Aston Martin 4.0 L Turbo V8	65	(Malaysia) Dominic Ang	1–2
(Malaysia) Viper Niza Racing	Aston Martin Vantage AMR GT3	Aston Martin 4.0 L Turbo V8	65	(Malaysia) Douglas Khoo	1–2
(Spain) Bullitt Racing	Aston Martin Vantage AMR GT3	Aston Martin 4.0 L Turbo V8	66	(Australia) Martin Berry	All
(Spain) Bullitt Racing	Aston Martin Vantage AMR GT3	Aston Martin 4.0 L Turbo V8	66	(France) Valentin Hasse-Clot	All
(Spain) Bullitt Racing	Aston Martin Vantage AMR GT3	Aston Martin 4.0 L Turbo V8	66	(Germany) Jacob Riegel	All
(United Kingdom) Orange Racing powered by JMH	McLaren 720S GT3	McLaren M840T 4.0 L Turbo V8	67	(United Kingdom) Marcus Clutton	All
(United Kingdom) Orange Racing powered by JMH	McLaren 720S GT3	McLaren M840T 4.0 L Turbo V8	67	(United Kingdom) Michael O'Brien	All
(United Kingdom) Orange Racing powered by JMH	McLaren 720S GT3	McLaren M840T 4.0 L Turbo V8	67	(United Kingdom) Simon Orange	All
(Chinese Taipei) HubAuto Racing	Mercedes-AMG GT3 Evo	Mercedes-AMG M159 6.2 L V8	72	(Andorra) Jules Gounon	All
(Chinese Taipei) HubAuto Racing	Mercedes-AMG GT3 Evo	Mercedes-AMG M159 6.2 L V8	72	(United Kingdom) Ollie Millroy	All
(Chinese Taipei) HubAuto Racing	Mercedes-AMG GT3 Evo	Mercedes-AMG M159 6.2 L V8	72	(Australia) Liam Talbot	All

Notes:

- Richard Heistand was scheduled to compete for Walkenhorst Motorsport, but withdrew prior to the start of the season. He was replaced by Thomas Merrill.

== Results ==
Bold indicates overall winner.

Round	Circuit	LMP2 Winning Team	LMP3 Winning Team	GT Winning Team	Ref.
Round	Circuit	LMP2 Winning Drivers	LMP3 Winning Drivers	GT Winning Drivers	Ref.
1	(United Arab Emirates) Dubai	**(Portugal) #25 Algarve Pro Racing**	(France) #29 MV2S Racing	(Germany) #34 Walkenhorst Motorsport	Report
1	(United Arab Emirates) Dubai	**(Australia) James Allen** **(United States) John Falb** **(Barbados) Kyffin Simpson**	(Switzerland) Jérôme de Sadeleer; Vyacheslav Gutak (France) Fabien Lavergne	(Netherlands) Nicky Catsburg (United States) Chandler Hull (United States) Thomas Merrill	Report
2	(United Arab Emirates) Dubai	**(Poland) #43 Inter Europol Competition**	(Luxembourg) #5 DKR Engineering	(Germany) #34 Walkenhorst Motorsport	Report
2	(United Arab Emirates) Dubai	**(United States) Christian Bogle** **(United States) Charles Crews** **(United States) Nolan Siegel**	(Germany) Valentino Catalano (Belgium) Tom Van Rompuy	(Netherlands) Nicky Catsburg (United States) Chandler Hull (United States) Thomas Merrill	Report
3	(United Arab Emirates) Abu Dhabi	**(Switzerland) #37 Cool Racing**	(United Kingdom) #4 Nielsen Racing	(Oman) #7 Haupt Racing Team	Report
3	(United Arab Emirates) Abu Dhabi	**(Switzerland) Alexandre Coigny** **(Denmark) Malthe Jakobsen**	(United Kingdom) Tony Wells (United Kingdom) Matthew Bell	(Oman) Al Faisal Al Zubair (Germany) Luca Stolz (Austria) Martin Konrad	Report
4	(United Arab Emirates) Abu Dhabi	**(Luxembourg) #3 DKR Engineering**	(France) #8 Graff Racing	(Oman) #7 Haupt Racing Team	Report
4	(United Arab Emirates) Abu Dhabi	**(Turkey) Salih Yoluç** **(United Kingdom) Charlie Eastwood** **(Turkey) Ayhancan Güven**	(France) Fabrice Rossello (Spain) Xavier Lloveras (France) François Hériau	(Oman) Al Faisal Al Zubair (Germany) Luca Stolz (Austria) Martin Konrad	Report

== Teams' Championships ==
Points are awarded according to the following structure:

Position	**1st**	**2nd**	**3rd**	**4th**	**5th**	**6th**	**7th**	**8th**	**9th**	**10th**	**Pole**
Points	25	18	15	12	10	8	6	4	2	1	1

=== LMP2 Teams Championship ===
Pos.	Team	Car	DUB (United Arab Emirates)		ABU (United Arab Emirates)		Points
1	(Luxembourg) #3 DKR Engineering	Oreca 07	2	2	3	1	76
2	(Switzerland) #37 Cool Racing	Oreca 07	8	5	1	3	54
3	(Portugal) #25 Algarve Pro Racing	Oreca 07	1	4	9	4	51
4	(United Kingdom) #98 99 Racing	Oreca 07	3	6	**7**	**2**	49
5	(Poland) #43 Inter Europol Competition	Oreca 07	**Ret**	**1**	4	NC	39
6	(United Kingdom) #24 Nielsen Racing	Oreca 07	4	3	6	8	39
7	(United Kingdom) #23 United Autosports	Oreca 07	6	8	2	6	38
8	(United Kingdom) #22 United Autosports	Oreca 07	5	7	5	5	36
9	(Slovakia) #44 ARC Bratislava	Oreca 07	7	9	8	7	18

Key
Colour	Result
Gold	Race winner
Silver	2nd place
Bronze	3rd place
Green	Points finish
Blue	Non-points finish
Blue	Non-classified finish (NC)
Purple	Did not finish (Ret)
Black	Disqualified (DSQ)
Black	Excluded (EX)
White	Did not start (DNS)
White	Race cancelled (C)
White	Withdrew (WD)
Blank	Did not participate

**Bold** – Pole

=== LMP3 Teams Championship ===
Pos.	Team	Car	DUB (United Arab Emirates)		ABU (United Arab Emirates)		Points
1	(France) #8 Graff Racing	Ligier JS P320	2	2	4	1	73
2	(France) #29 MV2S Racing	Ligier JS P320	1	3	2	3	73
3	(United Kingdom) #4 Nielsen Racing	Ligier JS P320	13	6	1	4	45
4	(Luxembourg) #5 DKR Engineering	Duqueine M30 - D08	6	1	5	Ret	43
5	(Germany) #11 WTM by Rinaldi Racing	Duqueine M30 - D08	**Ret**	**4**	**3**	**Ret**	31
6	(Spain) #1 CD Sport	Ligier JS P320	3	9	8	7	27
7	(Poland) #73 Inter Europol Competition	Ligier JS P320	5	7	10	5	27
8	(Switzerland) #17 Cool Racing	Ligier JS P320	14	Ret	6	2	26
9	(Spain) #2 CD Sport	Ligier JS P320	7	5	Ret	9	18
10	(France) #9 Graff Racing	Ligier JS P320	8	8	7	Ret	14
11	(Germany) #55 Rinaldi Racing	Duqueine M30 - D08	4	Ret	Ret	Ret	12
12	(Poland) #53 Inter Europol Competition	Ligier JS P320	9	12	9	6	12
13	(United Kingdom) #18 360 Racing	Ligier JS P320	12	13	Ret	8	4
14	(United Kingdom) #15 RLR MSport	Ligier JS P320	10	10	11	Ret	2
15	(Poland) #63 Inter Europol Competition	Ligier JS P320	11	11	12	Ret	0

Key
Colour	Result
Gold	Race winner
Silver	2nd place
Bronze	3rd place
Green	Points finish
Blue	Non-points finish
Blue	Non-classified finish (NC)
Purple	Did not finish (Ret)
Black	Disqualified (DSQ)
Black	Excluded (EX)
White	Did not start (DNS)
White	Race cancelled (C)
White	Withdrew (WD)
Blank	Did not participate

**Bold** – Pole

=== GT Teams Championship ===
Pos.	Team	Car	DUB (United Arab Emirates)		ABU (United Arab Emirates)		Points
1	(Germany) #34 Walkenhorst Motorsport	BMW M4 GT3	**1**	**1**	4	2	82
2	(Oman) #7 Haupt Racing Team	Mercedes-AMG GT3 Evo	3	7	1	1	71
3	(Germany) #10 GetSpeed Performance	Mercedes-AMG GT3 Evo	2	2	7	5	52
4	(Germany) #91 Herberth Motorsport	Porsche 911 GT3 R	4	10	2	15	31
5	(Germany) #19 Leipert Motorsport	Lamborghini Huracán GT3 Evo	10	12	3	3	31
6	(Germany) #20 Herberth Motorsport	Porsche 911 GT3 R	5	16	9	4	24
7	(Italy) #21 AF Corse	Ferrari 488 GT3 Evo 2020	9	3	Ret	7	23
8	(United Kingdom) #88 Garage 59	McLaren 720S GT3	15	4	Ret	8	16
9	(Japan) #77 D'station Racing	Aston Martin Vantage AMR GT3	13	6	6	Ret	16
10	(Germany) #99 Herberth Motorsport	Porsche 911 GT3 R	6	8	Ret	9	14
11	(Chinese Taipei) #72 HubAuto Racing	Mercedes-AMG GT3 Evo	Ret	9	**14**	**6**	28
12	(United Kingdom) #59 Garage 59	McLaren 720S GT3	12	5	11	10	11
13	(United Kingdom) #95 TF Sport	Aston Martin Vantage AMR GT3	11	14	5	11	10
14	(Germany) #6 Haupt Racing Team	Mercedes-AMG GT3 Evo	7	15	13	Ret	6
15	(Denmark) #60 Formula Racing	Ferrari 488 GT3 Evo 2020	8	Ret	Ret	WD	4
16	(Germany) #33 Herberth Motorsport	Porsche 911 GT3 R	Ret	11	8	12	4
17	(Japan) #57 Car Guy Racing	Ferrari 488 GT3 Evo 2020	14	Ret	10	14	1
18	(Germany) #16 GetSpeed Performance	Mercedes-AMG GT3 Evo	17	19	12	16	0
19	(Spain) #66 Bullitt Racing	Aston Martin Vantage AMR GT3	Ret	17	Ret	13	0
20	(Switzerland) #74 Kessel Racing	Ferrari 488 GT3 Evo 2020	NC	13	DNS	WD	0
21	(United Kingdom) #67 Orange Racing powered by JMH	McLaren 720S GT3	16	18	DNS	WD	0
22	(Malaysia) #65 Viper Niza Racing	Aston Martin Vantage AMR GT3	NC	Ret			0
-	(Italy) #54 Dinamic GT	Porsche 911 GT3 R	DNS	WD			
-	(United Kingdom) #61 TF Sport	Aston Martin Vantage AMR GT3	DNS	WD			

Key
Colour	Result
Gold	Race winner
Silver	2nd place
Bronze	3rd place
Green	Points finish
Blue	Non-points finish
Blue	Non-classified finish (NC)
Purple	Did not finish (Ret)
Black	Disqualified (DSQ)
Black	Excluded (EX)
White	Did not start (DNS)
White	Race cancelled (C)
White	Withdrew (WD)
Blank	Did not participate

**Bold** – Pole

== Drivers' championships ==
Points are awarded according to the following structure:

Position	**1st**	**2nd**	**3rd**	**4th**	**5th**	**6th**	**7th**	**8th**	**9th**	**10th**	**Pole**
Points	25	18	15	12	10	8	6	4	2	1	1

=== LMP2 Drivers Championship ===
Pos.	Drivers	Team	DUB (United Arab Emirates)		ABU (United Arab Emirates)		Points
1	(Republic of Ireland) Charlie Eastwood	(Luxembourg) DKR Engineering	2	2	3	1	76
1	(Turkey) Ayhancan Güven	(Luxembourg) DKR Engineering	2	2	3	1	76
1	(Turkey) Salih Yoluç	(Luxembourg) DKR Engineering	2	2	3	1	76
2	(Switzerland) Alexandre Coigny	(Switzerland) Cool Racing	8	5	1	3	54
2	(Denmark) Malthe Jakobsen	(Switzerland) Cool Racing	8	5	1	3	54
3	(Australia) James Allen	(Portugal) Algarve Pro Racing	1	4	9	4	51
3	(United States) John Falb	(Portugal) Algarve Pro Racing	1	4	9	4	51
3	(Barbados) Kyffin Simpson	(Portugal) Algarve Pro Racing	1	4	9	4	51
4	(Switzerland) Neel Jani	(United Kingdom) 99 Racing	3	6	**7**	**2**	49
4	Nikita Mazepin	(United Kingdom) 99 Racing	3	6	**7**	**2**	49
5	(United States) Christian Bogle	(Poland) Inter Europol Competition	**Ret**	**1**	4	NC	39
5	(United States) Charles Crews	(Poland) Inter Europol Competition	**Ret**	**1**	4	NC	39
5	(United States) Nolan Siegel	(Poland) Inter Europol Competition	**Ret**	**1**	4	NC	39
6	(Switzerland) Mathias Beche	(United Kingdom) Nielsen Racing	4	3	6	8	39
6	(United Kingdom) Ben Hanley	(United Kingdom) Nielsen Racing	4	3	6	8	39
6	(United States) Rodrigo Sales	(United Kingdom) Nielsen Racing	4	3	6	8	39
7	(United Kingdom) Oliver Jarvis	(United Kingdom) United Autosports	6	8	2	6	38
7	(Australia) Garnet Patterson	(United Kingdom) United Autosports	6	8	2	6	38
7	(Australia) Yasser Shahin	(United Kingdom) United Autosports	6	8	2	6	38
8	(United Kingdom) Paul di Resta	(United Kingdom) United Autosports	5	7	5	5	36
8	(United Kingdom) Philip Hanson	(United Kingdom) United Autosports	5	7	5	5	36
8	(United States) James McGuire	(United Kingdom) United Autosports	5	7	5	5	36
9	(Oman) Ahmad Al Harthy	(United Kingdom) 99 Racing			**7**	**2**	26
10	(Portugal) Gonçalo Gomes	(United Kingdom) 99 Racing	3	6			23
11	(Slovakia) Miro Konôpka	(Slovakia) ARC Bratislava	7	9	8	7	18
11	(Chile) Nico Pino	(Slovakia) ARC Bratislava	7	9	8	7	18
11	(Hungary) László Tóth	(Slovakia) ARC Bratislava	7	9	8	7	18
12	(France) Nicolas Lapierre	(Switzerland) Cool Racing	8	5			14

Key
Colour	Result
Gold	Race winner
Silver	2nd place
Bronze	3rd place
Green	Points finish
Blue	Non-points finish
Blue	Non-classified finish (NC)
Purple	Did not finish (Ret)
Black	Disqualified (DSQ)
Black	Excluded (EX)
White	Did not start (DNS)
White	Race cancelled (C)
White	Withdrew (WD)
Blank	Did not participate

**Bold** – Pole

=== LMP3 Drivers Championship ===
Pos.	Drivers	Team	DUB (United Arab Emirates)		ABU (United Arab Emirates)		Points
1	(France) François Hériau	(France) Graff Racing	2	2	4	1	73
1	(Spain) Xavier Lloveras	(France) Graff Racing	2	2	4	1	73
1	(France) Fabrice Rossello	(France) Graff Racing	2	2	4	1	73
2	(Switzerland) Jérôme de Sadeleer	(France) MV2S Racing	1	3	2	3	73
2	Vyacheslav Gutak	(France) MV2S Racing	1	3	2	3	73
2	(France) Fabien Lavergne	(France) MV2S Racing	1	3	2	3	73
3	(United Kingdom) Matt Bell	(United Kingdom) Nielsen Racing	13	6	1	4	45
3	(United Kingdom) Tony Wells	(United Kingdom) Nielsen Racing	13	6	1	4	45
4	(Germany) Valentino Catalano	(Luxembourg) DKR Engineering	6	1	5	Ret	43
4	(Belgium) Tom Van Rompuy	(Luxembourg) DKR Engineering	6	1	5	Ret	43
5	(Germany) Torsten Kratz	(Germany) WTM by Rinaldi Racing	**Ret**	**4**	**3**	**Ret**	31
5	(Argentina) Nicolás Varrone	(Germany) WTM by Rinaldi Racing	**Ret**	**4**	**3**	**Ret**	31
5	(Germany) Leonard Weiss	(Germany) WTM by Rinaldi Racing	**Ret**	**4**	**3**	**Ret**	31
6	(United Kingdom) Nick Adcock	(Spain) CD Sport	3	9	8	7	27
6	(Denmark) Valdemar Eriksen	(Spain) CD Sport	3	9	8	7	27
6	(Denmark) Michael Jensen	(Spain) CD Sport	3	9	8	7	27
7	(Saint Kitts and Nevis) Alexander Bukhantsov	(Poland) Inter Europol Competition	5	7	10	5	27
7	(Australia) John Corbett	(Poland) Inter Europol Competition	5	7	10	5	27
7	(United Kingdom) James Winslow	(Poland) Inter Europol Competition	5	7	10	5	27
8	(France) Adrien Chila	(Switzerland) Cool Racing	14	Ret	6	2	26
8	(Switzerland) Cédric Oltramare	(Switzerland) Cool Racing	14	Ret	6	2	26
8	(Argentina) Marcos Siebert	(Switzerland) Cool Racing	14	Ret	6	2	26
9	Vladislav Lomko	(Spain) CD Sport	7	5	Ret	9	18
9	(United Kingdom) James Sweetnam	(Spain) CD Sport	7	5	Ret	9	18
10	(France) Fabien Michal	(Spain) CD Sport	7	5			16
11	(Spain) Belén García	(France) Graff Racing	8	8	7	Ret	14
11	(Switzerland) Sébastien Page	(France) Graff Racing	8	8	7	Ret	14
11	(France) Eric Trouillet	(France) Graff Racing	8	8	7	Ret	14
12	(United Kingdom) Lorcan Hanafin	(Germany) Rinaldi Racing	4	Ret	Ret	Ret	12
12	(Germany) Matthias Lüthen	(Germany) Rinaldi Racing	4	Ret	Ret	Ret	12
12	(Germany) Jonas Ried	(Germany) Rinaldi Racing	4	Ret	Ret	Ret	12
13	(United Kingdom) Kai Askey	(Poland) Inter Europol Competition	9	12	9	6	12
13	(United States) Wyatt Brichacek	(Poland) Inter Europol Competition	9	12	9	6	12
13	(Portugal) Miguel Cristóvão	(Poland) Inter Europol Competition	9	12	9	6	12
14	(Mexico) Sebastián Álvarez	(United Kingdom) 360 Racing	12	13	Ret	8	4
14	(France) Frédéric Jousset	(United Kingdom) 360 Racing	12	13	Ret	8	4
14	(United Kingdom) Ross Kaiser	(United Kingdom) 360 Racing	12	13	Ret	8	4
15	(France) Jacques Wolff	(Spain) CD Sport			Ret	9	2
16	(Saint Kitts and Nevis) Amir Feyzulin	(United Kingdom) RLR MSport	10	10	11	Ret	2
16	(United States) Bijoy Garg	(United Kingdom) RLR MSport	10	10	11	Ret	2
16	(Australia) Andres Latorre Canon	(United Kingdom) RLR MSport	10	10	11	Ret	2
17	(Canada) Adam Ali	(Poland) Inter Europol Competition	11	11	12	Ret	0
17	(Canada) James Dayson	(Poland) Inter Europol Competition	11	11	12	Ret	0
17	(United States) John Schauerman	(Poland) Inter Europol Competition	11	11	12	Ret	0

Key
Colour	Result
Gold	Race winner
Silver	2nd place
Bronze	3rd place
Green	Points finish
Blue	Non-points finish
Blue	Non-classified finish (NC)
Purple	Did not finish (Ret)
Black	Disqualified (DSQ)
Black	Excluded (EX)
White	Did not start (DNS)
White	Race cancelled (C)
White	Withdrew (WD)
Blank	Did not participate

**Bold** – Pole

=== GT Drivers Championship ===
Pos.	Team	Team	DUB (United Arab Emirates)		ABU (United Arab Emirates)		Points
1	(Netherlands) Nicky Catsburg (United States) Chandler Hull (United States) Thomas Merrill	(Germany) Walkenhorst Motorsport	**1**	**1**	4	2	82
2	(Oman) Al Faisal Al Zubair (Austria) Martin Konrad (Germany) Luca Stolz	(Oman) Haupt Racing Team	3	7	1	1	71
3	(Switzerland) Raffaele Marciello (Germany) Fabian Schiller (Germany) Florian Scholze	(Germany) GetSpeed Performance	2	2	7	5	52
4	(United Kingdom) Harry King (United Kingdom) Alex Malykhin (Germany) Joel Sturm	(Germany) Herberth Motorsport	4	10	2	15	31
5	(New Zealand) Brendon Leitch (Italy) Marco Mapelli (Luxembourg) Gabriel Rindone	(Germany) Leipert Motorsport	10	12	3	3	31
6	(Italy) Matteo Cairoli (Switzerland) Nicolas Leutwiler (Denmark) Mikkel O. Pedersen	(Germany) Herberth Motorsport	5	16	9	4	24
7	(Italy) Stefano Costantini (United Kingdom) Simon Mann (Spain) Miguel Molina	(Italy) AF Corse	9	3	Ret	7	23
8	(Denmark) Benjamin Goethe (Sweden) Alexander West	(United Kingdom) Garage 59	15	4	Ret	8	16
9	(United Kingdom) Charlie Fagg (Japan) Tomonobu Fujii (Japan) Satoshi Hoshino	(Japan) D'station Racing	13	6	6	Ret	16
10	(Germany) Ralf Bohn (Zimbabwe) Axcil Jefferies (Germany) Robert Renauer	(Germany) Herberth Motorsport	6	8	Ret	9	14
11	(United Kingdom) Tom Gamble	(United Kingdom) Garage 59	15	4			12
12	(Andorra) Jules Gounon (United Kingdom) Ollie Millroy (Australia) Liam Talbot	(Chinese Taipei) HubAuto Racing	Ret	9	**14**	**6**	12
13	(United Kingdom) Rob Bell (United Kingdom) Nick Halstead (Monaco) Louis Prette	(United Kingdom) Garage 59	12	5	11	10	11
14	(United Kingdom) Jonathan Adam (Portugal) Henrique Chaves (United Kingdom) John Hartshorne	(United Kingdom) TF Sport	11	14	5	11	10
15	(United Kingdom) Frank Bird (France) Michael Blanchemain (India) Arjun Maini	(Germany) Haupt Racing Team	7	15	13	Ret	6
16	(Hong Kong) Antares Au (Austria) Klaus Bachler (Germany) Alfred Renauer	(Germany) Herberth Motorsport	Ret	11	8	12	4
17	(Denmark) Conrad Laursen (Denmark) Johnny Laursen (Denmark) Nicklas Nielsen	(Denmark) Formula Racing	8	Ret	Ret	WD	4
18	(Germany) Marvin Kirchhöfer	(United Kingdom) Garage 59			Ret	8	4
19	(Denmark) Mikkel Jensen (Japan) Takeshi Kimura (Denmark) Frederik Schandorff	(Japan) Car Guy Racing	14	Ret	10	14	1
20	(China) Zhou Bihuang (Switzerland) Alexandre Imperatori (China) Wang Zhongwei	(Germany) GetSpeed Performance	17	19	12	16	0
21	(Australia) Martin Berry (France) Valentin Hasse-Clot (Germany) Jacob Riegel	(Spain) Bullitt Racing	Ret	17	Ret	13	0
22	(Poland) Michał Broniszewski (Italy) David Fumanelli	(Switzerland) Kessel Racing	NC	13	DNS	WD	0
23	(United Kingdom) Ben Barker	(Italy) Dinamic GT	DNS				0
23	(United Kingdom) Ben Barker	(Switzerland) Kessel Racing		13	DNS	WD	0
24	(United Kingdom) Marcus Clutton (United Kingdom) Michael O'Brien (United Kingdom) Simon Orange	(United Kingdom) Orange Racing powered by JMH	16	18	DNS	WD	0
25	(Malaysia) Dominic Ang (Malaysia) Douglas Khoo	(Malaysia) Viper Niza Racing	NC	Ret	WD	WD	0
-	(Austria) Philipp Sager (Austria) Christopher Zöchling	(Italy) Dinamic GT	DNS	WD			
-	(Malaysia) Adrian Henry D'Silva (United Kingdom) Ross Gunn (Hong Kong) David Pun	(United Kingdom) TF Sport	DNS	WD			
-	(Brazil) Felipe Fraga	(Switzerland) Kessel Racing	WD	WD			

Key
Colour	Result
Gold	Race winner
Silver	2nd place
Bronze	3rd place
Green	Points finish
Blue	Non-points finish
Blue	Non-classified finish (NC)
Purple	Did not finish (Ret)
Black	Disqualified (DSQ)
Black	Excluded (EX)
White	Did not start (DNS)
White	Race cancelled (C)
White	Withdrew (WD)
Blank	Did not participate

**Bold** – Pole
