= François Hériau =

French racing driver (born 1983)

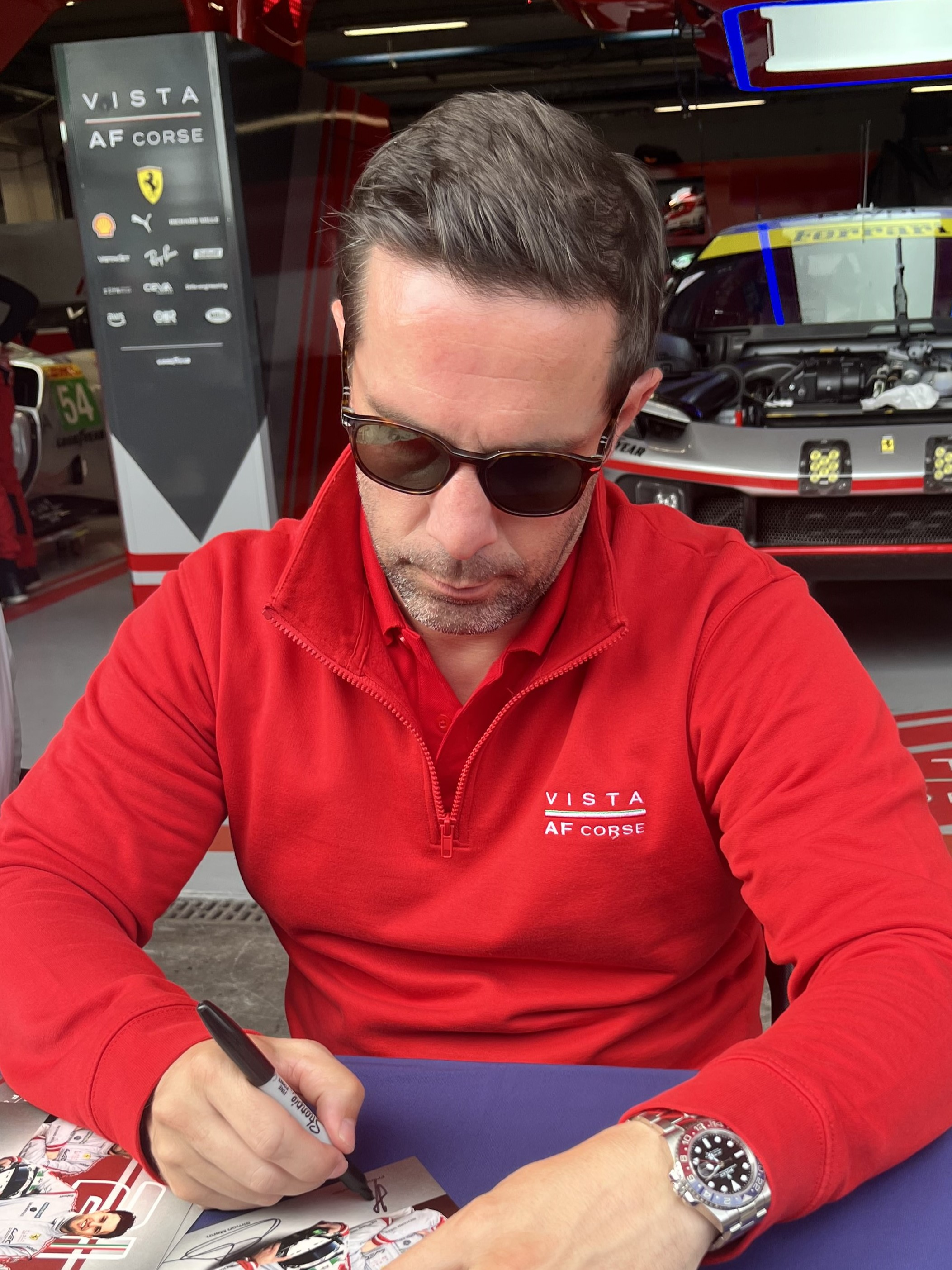
- Hériau in 2025
- Nationality: (France) French
- Born: François Thierry Roger Hériau; 25 October 1983 (age 43) Rennes, France

FIA World Endurance Championship career
- Current team: Vista AF Corse
- Categorisation: FIA Bronze
- Car number: 55

Championship titles
- 2023 2010: Asian Le Mans Series – LMP3; V de V Funyo Challenge

François Thierry Roger Hériau (born 25 October 1983) is a French businessman and racing driver who last competed in the LMGT3 class of the FIA World Endurance Championship for Vista AF Corse.

He is the president and CEO of Carlac Minerals (Carrières des Lacs), the Hériau family business, which dates back to 1946.

== Career ==
Hériau began his racing career in 2009, competing in the V de V Funyo Challenge, finishing third in points before winning the series title the following year for HMC Loheac. Racing in V de V Sports-run championships until 2015, Hériau also competed sporadically in the Challenge Endurance series, most notably competing for Ultimate in his final two years in the series.

In 2016, Hériau remained with Ultimate to compete in the LMP3 class of the European Le Mans Series alongside Jean-Baptiste and Matthieu Lahaye. In his first season in the series, Hériau scored a pair of fourth-place finishes at Le Castellet and Red Bull Ring to end the year tenth in points. Remaining with the team for the 2017 season, Hériau scored his maiden series podiums at Silverstone and Monza, which helped him end the year fourth in LMP3. At the end of the year, Hériau won the Gulf 12 Hours in the LMP3 Pro-Am class for the same team.

Continuing with Ultimate for 2018, Hériau scored a third-place finish at Silverstone to round out the year eighth in LMP3. At the end of the year, Hériau raced in the LMP2 class of the 2018–19 Asian Le Mans Series for Panis Barthez Competition, in which he scored a pair of third-place finishes in Buriram and Sepang. For the rest of 2019, Hériau returned to Ultimate for a fourth consecutive season in the LMP3 class of the European Le Mans Series. In what turned out to be his final season in LMP3 machinery, Hériau won at Le Castellet, before taking further podiums at Barcelona and Algarve to secure a third-place points finish in LMP3.

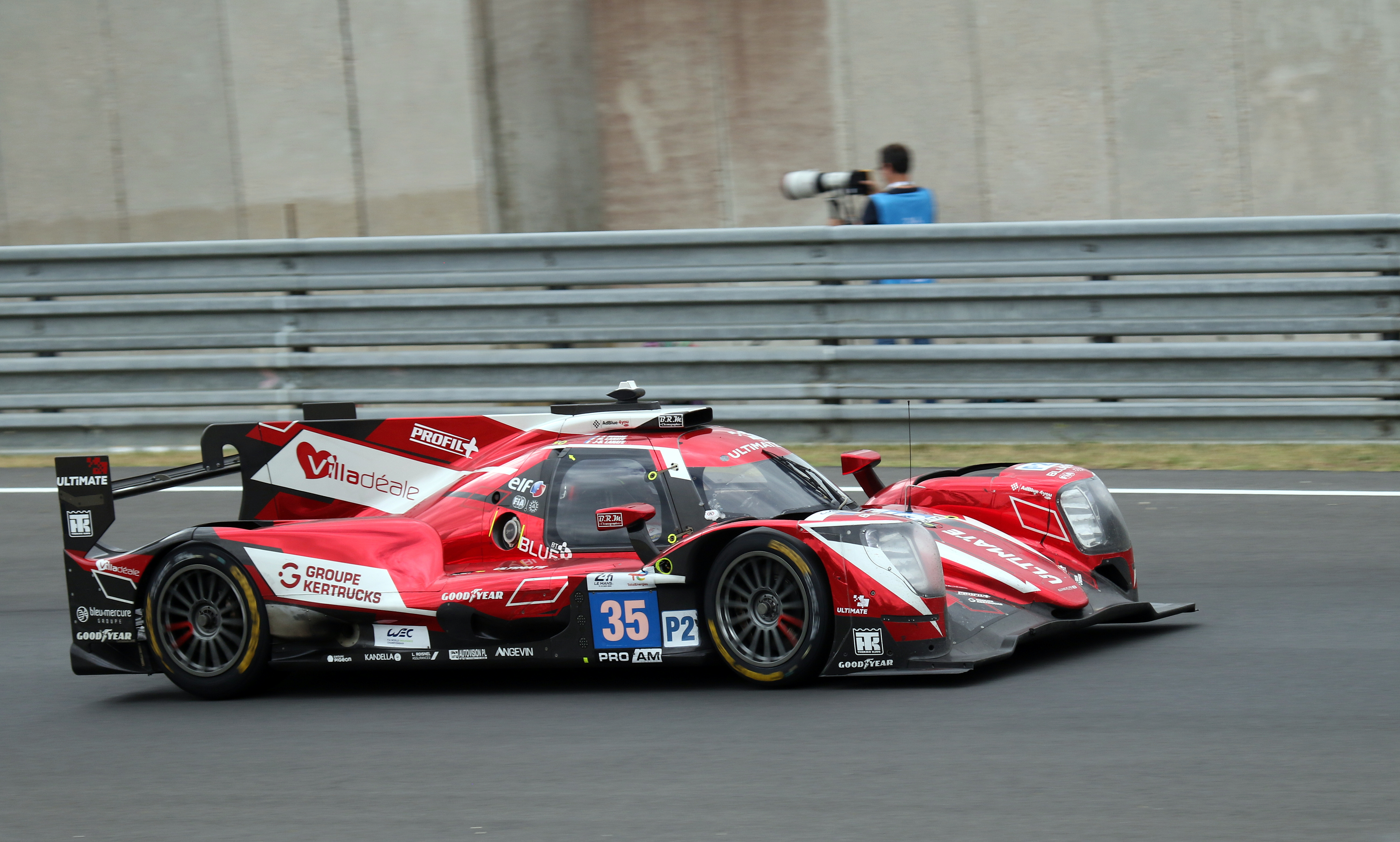
Hériau made his 24 Hours of Le Mans debut in 2022 in Ultimate's LMP2 car.

Following a one-off appearance in the following year's Le Mans Cup for EuroInternational, Hériau returned to Ultimate for 2021, now in a technical partnership Tech 1 Racing, to race in the LMP2 Pro-Am class of the European Le Mans Series. Racing in the first four rounds of the season, Hériau scored a class win at Barcelona and two further podiums, before pulling out from the final two races and the 24 Hours of Le Mans as a result of a shoulder injury. Returning to LMP2 competition the following year, Hériau began the year by racing in the 24 Hours of Daytona for G-Drive Racing by APR, before reuniting with Ultimate to race in the FIA World Endurance Championship for the rest of the year. Racing in the Pro-Am Cup in his first season in the World Endurance Championship, Hériau finished second in class in four out of the six races en route to a third-place points finish at the end of the year.

At the start of 2023, Hériau made a brief return to LMP3 competition, racing in the Asian Le Mans Series for Graff Racing, taking a lone win at Abu Dhabi and two podiums at Dubai to secure the class title. The Frenchman then returned to LMP2 competition as he raced in the first three rounds of the IMSA SportsCar Championship for TDS Racing, but a back injury from a testing accident forced him on the sidelines for most of the year, causing him to also miss the 24 Hours of Le Mans for the second time in three years. Towards the end of the year, Hériau raced in the GT class of the 2023–24 Asian Le Mans Series for Ferrari-affiliated AF Corse, taking a lone podium at Dubai as he ended the season eighth in points.

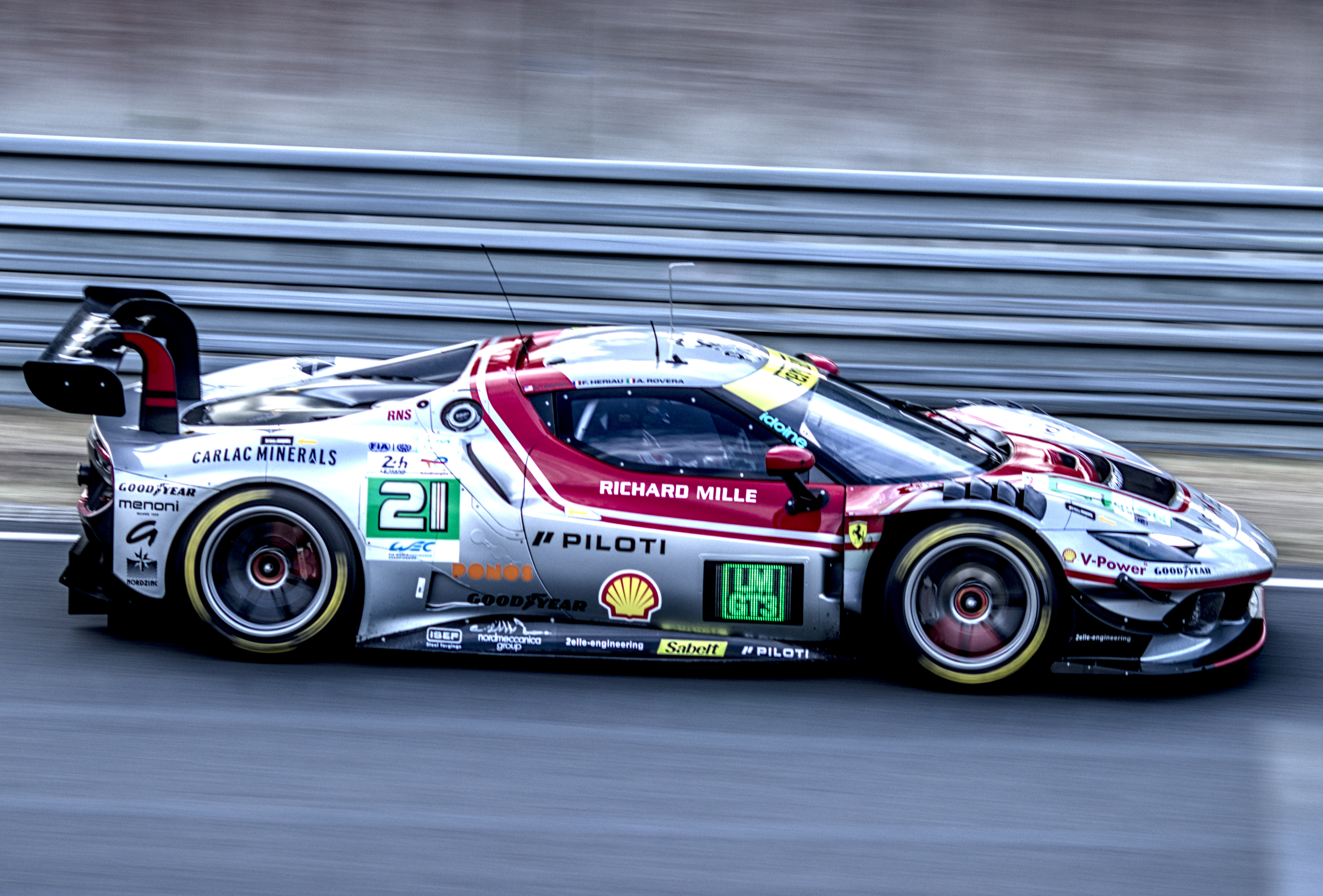
Hériau's AF Corse Ferrari at the 2025 24 Hours of Le Mans.

Remaining in GT competition for the rest of 2024, Hériau remained with the Italian to race in the LMGT3 class of the FIA World Endurance Championship, as well as competing in the Endurance round of the IMSA SportsCar Championship in GTD. In the former, Hériau qualified on pole for the 6 Hours of Fuji, before ending the year with a win at the 8 Hours of Bahrain en route to a third-place points finish. In the latter, Hériau finished second in the 24 Hours of Daytona, which turned out to be his only podium of the season. The following year, Hériau remained with AF Corse for his third season in the FIA World Endurance Championship, winning the 6 Hours of Spa-Francorchamps and scoring two other podiums en route to runner-up honors in LMGT3. At the end of the year, Hériau raced in the 2025–26 Asian Le Mans Series for Porsche-fielding Manthey Racing, scoring a best result of fourth twice as he ended the season 10th in the GT standings.

For the rest of 2026, Hériau returned to AF Corse for his third consecutive season in the LMGT3 class of the FIA World Endurance Championship, scoring a best result of fourth twice to finish eighth in points at season's end. During 2026, Hériau also made a cameo appearance in the European Le Mans Series, joining Aston Martin-affiliated Racing Spirit of Léman to compete in the LMGT3 class at Silverstone.

== Racing record ==
=== Racing career summary ===
Season	Series	Team	Races	Wins	Poles	F/Laps	Podiums	Points	Position
2009	V de V Funyo Challenge	Y.O. Concept						427	**3rd**
2010	V de V Funyo Challenge	HMC Loheac						696	**1st**
2011	V de V Funyo Challenge	HMC Loheac						550	**3rd**
2011	V de V Challenge Endurance Moderne – Proto	Equipe Palmyr						12	37th
2012	V de V Funyo Challenge – F5	AGR						545.5	**3rd**
2012	V de V Challenge Endurance Moderne – Proto	Equipe Palmyr						7.5	43rd
2013	V de V Funyo Challenge – F5	AGR						130.5	**3rd**
2014	V de V Funyo Challenge	AGR						156	18th
2014	V de V Challenge Endurance Moderne – Scratch	Ultimate; Graff Racing						16.5	35th
2015	V de V Funyo Endurance	AGR / Bleu Mercure							7th
2015	V de V Challenge Endurance Moderne – Scratch	Ultimate						43.5	16th
2016	European Le Mans Series – LMP3	Ultimate	6	0	0	0	0	26	10th
2017	European Le Mans Series – LMP3	Ultimate	6	0	0	0	2	61	4th
2017	Gulf 12 Hours – LMP3 Pro-Am	Ultimate	1	1	0	0	1	—N/a	**1st**
2018	European Le Mans Series – LMP3	Ultimate	6	0	3	0	1	36.5	8th
2018	Le Mans Cup – LMP3	Ultimate	2	0	0	0	0	1.5	39th
2018	Le Mans Cup – LMP3	Graff	1	0	0	0	0	1.5	39th
2018–19	Asian Le Mans Series – LMP2	Panis Barthez Competition	4	0	0	0	2	50	4th
2019	European Le Mans Series – LMP3	Ultimate	6	1	0	0	3	76	**3rd**
2020	Le Mans Cup – LMP3	EuroInternational	2	0	0	0	0	0	NC
2021	European Le Mans Series – LMP2 Pro-Am	Ultimate	4	1	0	0	3	67	6th
2022	IMSA SportsCar Championship – LMP2	G-Drive Racing by APR	1	0	0	0	0	0	NC
2022	FIA World Endurance Championship – LMP2 Pro-Am	Ultimate	6	0	0	0	5	129	**3rd**
2023	IMSA SportsCar Championship – LMP2	TDS Racing	3	0	0	0	0	570	21st
2023	Asian Le Mans Series – LMP3	Graff Racing	4	1	0	0	3	73	**1st**
2023	European Le Mans Series – LMP3	EuroInternational	1	0	0	0	0	0	17th
2023–24	Asian Le Mans Series – GT	AF Corse	5	0	0	0	1	32	8th
2024	IMSA SportsCar Championship – GTD	AF Corse	5	0	0	0	1	1154	30th
2024	FIA World Endurance Championship – LMP3	Vista AF Corse	8	1	1	0	3	97	**3rd**
2024	European Le Mans Series – LMP3	Ultimate	1	0	0	0	0	0	22nd
2025	FIA World Endurance Championship – LMGT3	Vista AF Corse	8	1	0	0	3	109	**2nd**
2025	European Endurance Prototype Cup	CD Sport	1	0	0	0	0	0.5	77th
2025–26	Asian Le Mans Series – GT	Manthey Racing	6	0	0	0	0	38	10th
2026	FIA World Endurance Championship – LMGT3	Vista AF Corse	8	0	0	0	0	68	8th
2026	European Le Mans Series – LMGT3	Racing Spirit of Léman	1	0	0	0	0	1	33rd

=== Complete European Le Mans Series results ===
(key) (Races in bold indicate pole position; results in italics indicate fastest lap)

Year	Entrant	Class	Chassis	Engine	1	2	3	4	5	6	Rank	Points
2016	Ultimate	LMP3	Ligier JS P3	Nissan VK50VE 5.0 L V8	SIL; 11	IMO; 10	RBR; Ret	LEC; 4	SPA; 4	EST; 14	10th	26
2017	Ultimate	LMP3	Ligier JS P3	Nissan VK50VE 5.0 L V8	SIL; 2	MNZ; 3	RBR; 4	LEC; 6	SPA; 8	ALG; 8	4th	61
2018	Ultimate	LMP3	Norma M30	Nissan VK50VE 5.0 L V8	LEC; Ret	**MNZ**; 7	**RBR**; 4	SIL; 3	**SPA**; Ret	ALG; 12	8th	36.5
2019	Ultimate	LMP3	Norma M30	Nissan VK50VE 5.0 L V8	LEC; 1	MNZ; Ret	CAT; 2	SIL; 7	SPA; 4	ALG; 3	3rd	76
2021	Ultimate	LMP2	Oreca 07	Gibson GK428 4.2 L V8	CAT; 5	RBR; 5	LEC; 13	MNZ; 11	SPA	ALG	18th	21.5
2021	Ultimate	Pro-Am Cup	Oreca 07	Gibson GK428 4.2 L V8	1	3	4	3			6th	67
2023	EuroInternational	LMP3	Ligier JS P320	Nissan VK56DE 5.6L V8	CAT	LEC	ARA	SPA; Ret	PRT	ALG	17th	0
2024	Ultimate	LMP3	Ligier JS P320	Nissan VK56DE 5.6L V8	CAT	LEC	IMO	SPA	MUG	ALG; Ret	22nd	0
2026	Racing Spirit of Léman	LMGT3	Aston Martin Vantage AMR GT3 Evo	Aston Martin M177 4.0 L Turbo V8	CAT	LEC	IMO	SPA	SIL; 10	ALG	33rd	1

=== Complete Le Mans Cup results ===
(key) (Races in bold indicate pole position; results in italics indicate fastest lap)

Year	Entrant	Class	Chassis	1	2	3	4	5	6	7	Rank	Points
2018	Ultimate	LMP3	Norma M30	LEC	MNZ	LMS; 1; 35	LMS; 2; 35	RBR			39th	1.5
2018	Graff	LMP3	Norma M30						SPA; 14	ALG	39th	1.5
2020	EuroInternational	LMP3	Ligier JS P320	LEC1	SPA	LEC2	LMS; 1; 18	LMS; 2; 18	MNZ	ALG	NC	0

=== Complete Asian Le Mans Series results ===
(key) (Races in bold indicate pole position) (Races in italics indicate fastest lap)

Year	Team	Class	Car	Engine	1	2	3	4	5	6	Pos.	Points
2018–19	Panis Barthez Competition	LMP2	Ligier JS P2	Judd HK 3.6 L V8	SHA; 6	FUJ; 4	CHA; 3	SEP; 3			4th	50
2023	Graff Racing	LMP3	Ligier JS P320	Nissan VK56DE 5.6L V8	DUB; 1; 2	DUB; 2; 2	ABU; 1; 4	ABU; 2; 1			1st	73
2023–24	AF Corse	GT	Ferrari 296 GT3	Ferrari F163CE 3.0 L Turbo V6	SEP; 1; 10	SEP; 2 Ret	DUB; 3	ABU; 1; 7	ABU; 2; 5		8th	32
2025–26	Manthey Racing	GT	Porsche 911 GT3 R (992)	Porsche M97/80 4.2 L Flat-6	SEP; 1; 4	SEP; 2; 8	DUB; 1; 9	DUB; 2; 4	ABU; 1; 7	ABU; 2; 12	10th	38

=== Complete IMSA SportsCar Championship results ===
(key) (Races in bold indicate pole position; races in italics indicate fastest lap)

Year	Entrant	Class	Make	Engine	1	2	3	4	5	6	7	8	9	10	Rank	Points
2022	G-Drive Racing by APR	LMP2	Aurus 01	Gibson GK428 V8	DAY; 5	SEB	LGA	MDO	WGL	ELK	PET				NC†	0
2023	TDS Racing	LMP2	Oreca 07	Gibson GK428 4.2 L V8	DAY; 4	SEB; 8	LGA; 4	WGL	ELK	IMS	PET				21st	570
2024	AF Corse	GTD	Ferrari 296 GT3	Ferrari F163CE 3.0 L Turbo V6	DAY; 2	SEB; 19	LBH	LGA	WGL; 6	MOS	ELK	VIR	IMS; 20	PET; 6	30th	1154

^{†} Points only counted towards the Michelin Endurance Cup, and not the overall LMP2 Championship.

=== Complete FIA World Endurance Championship results ===
Year	Entrant	Class	Car	Engine	1	2	3	4	5	6	7	8	Rank	Points
2022	Ultimate	LMP2	Oreca 07	Gibson GK428 4.2 L V8	SEB; 10	SPA; 12	LMS; 14	MNZ; 8	FUJ; 12	BHR; 11			21st	6
2022	Ultimate	Pro-Am Cup	Oreca 07	Gibson GK428 4.2 L V8	2	3	4	2	2	2			3rd	129
2024	Vista AF Corse	LMGT3	Ferrari 296 GT3	Ferrari F163CE 3.0 L Turbo V6	QAT; 7	IMO; 4	SPA; 13	LMS; 5	SÃO; 6	COA; 10	**FUJ**; 6	BHR; 1	3rd	97
2025	Vista AF Corse	LMGT3	Ferrari 296 GT3	Ferrari F163CE 3.0 L Turbo V6	QAT; 5	IMO; Ret	SPA; 1	LMS; 2	SÃO; 13	COA; 12	FUJ; 2	BHR; 5	2nd	109
2026	Vista AF Corse	LMGT3	Ferrari 296 GT3 Evo	Ferrari F163CE 3.0 L Turbo V6	IMO; 6	SPA; 4	LMS; 5	SÃO; 9	COA; 4	FUJ; Ret	CAT; 5	MNZ; 8	8th	68

=== 24 Hours of Le Mans results ===
Year	Team	Co-Drivers	Car	Class	Laps	Pos.	Class Pos.
2022	(France) Ultimate	(France) Jean-Baptiste Lahaye (France) Matthieu Lahaye	Oreca 07-Gibson	LMP2	335	48th	24th
2022	(France) Ultimate	(France) Jean-Baptiste Lahaye (France) Matthieu Lahaye	Oreca 07-Gibson	LMP2 Pro-Am	335	48th	8th
2024	(Italy) Vista AF Corse	(United States) Simon Mann (Italy) Alessio Rovera	Ferrari 296 GT3	LMGT3	279	33rd	6th
2025	(Italy) Vista AF Corse	(United States) Simon Mann (Italy) Alessio Rovera	Ferrari 296 GT3	LMGT3	341	34th	**2nd**
2026	(Italy) Vista AF Corse	(United States) Simon Mann (Italy) Alessio Rovera	Ferrari 296 GT3 Evo	LMGT3	335	37th	5th
