= Jérôme de Sadeleer =

Swiss rally raid driver

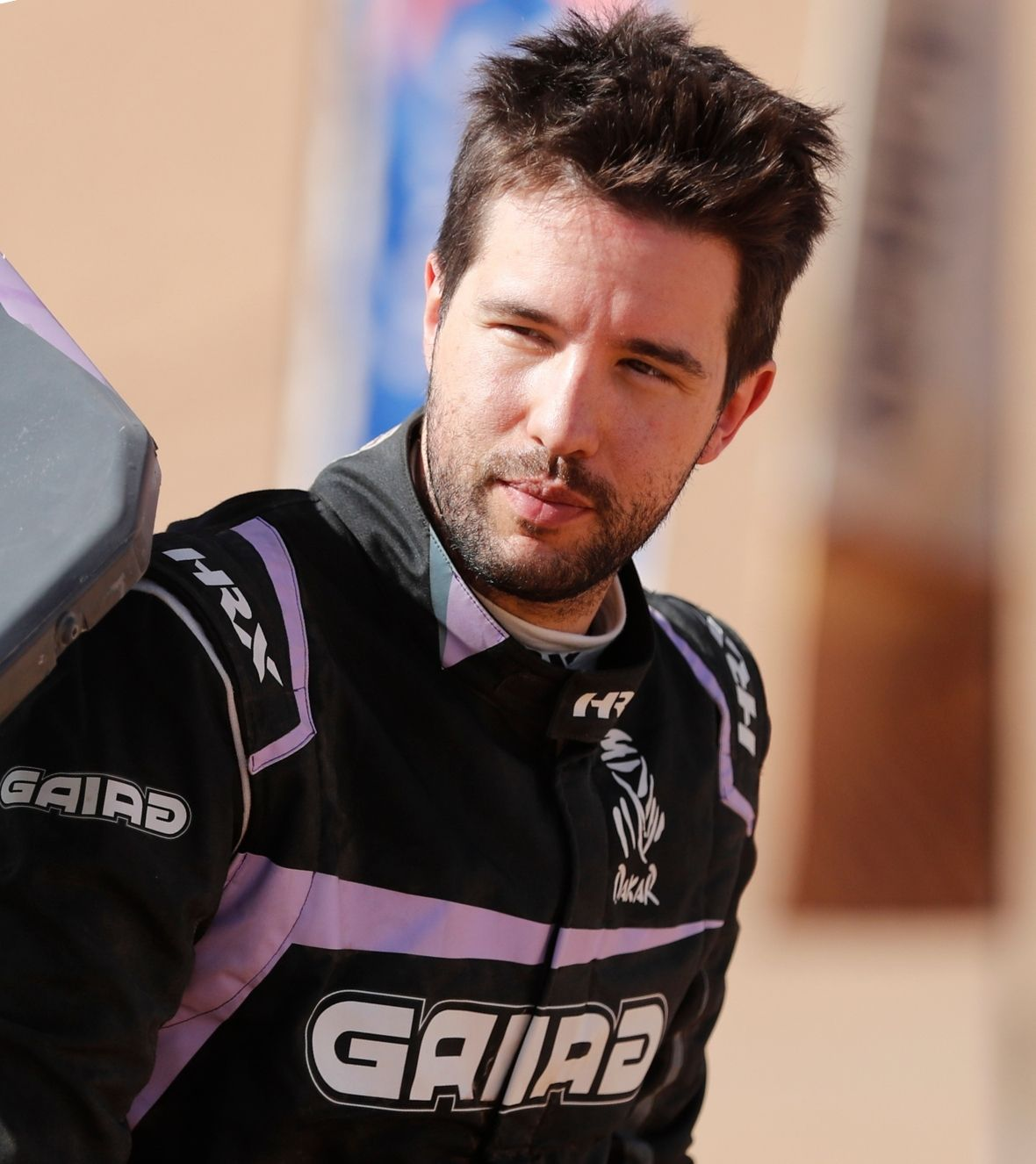
- Nationality: (Switzerland) Swiss
- Born: 5 June 1988 (age 38) Lausanne, Switzerland
- Categorisation: FIA Bronze (2022); FIA Silver (2023–)

Jérôme de Sadeleer (born 5 June 1988) is a Swiss rally raid racer who currently competes in the UTV category. He competed in the 2024 Dakar Rally, finishing second in the T4 class. He is the older brother of racing driver Hugo de Sadeleer.

== Racing record ==
=== Complete European Le Mans Series results ===
(key) (Races in bold indicate pole position; results in italics indicate fastest lap)

Year	Entrant	Class	Chassis	Engine	1	2	3	4	5	6	Rank	Points
2022	EuroInternational	LMP3	Ligier JS P320	Nissan VK56DE 5.6L V8	LEC	IMO; 7	MNZ; 3	CAT; 7	SPA; 6	ALG; DNS	10th	35

=== Complete Le Mans Cup results ===
(key) (Races in bold indicate pole position; results in italics indicate fastest lap)

Year	Entrant	Class	Chassis	Engine	1	2	3	4	5	6	7	Rank	Points
2022	MV2S Racing	LMP3	Ligier JS P320	Nissan VK56DE 5.6L V8	LEC; 2	IMO; Ret	LMS; 7	LMS; 11	MNZ; 2	SPA; 7	ALG; Ret	5th	47
2023	MV2S Racing	LMP3	Ligier JS P320	Nissan VK56DE 5.6L V8	CAT; 23	LMS; 22	LMS; 11	LEC; 17	ARA; 21	SPA; 3	**ALG**; Ret	14th	16

=== Complete Asian Le Mans Series results ===
(key) (Races in bold indicate pole position) (Races in italics indicate fastest lap)

Year	Team	Class	Car	Engine	1	2	3	4	Pos.	Points
2023	MV2S Racing	LMP3	Ligier JS P320	Nissan VK56DE 5.6L V8	DUB; 1; 1	DUB; 2; 3	ABU; 1; 2	ABU; 2; 3	2nd	73

=== Dakar Rally results ===
Year	Class	Vehicle	Position	Stages won
2022	SSV	(Canada) Can-Am	19th	0
2024	SSV	(Canada) Can-Am	**2nd**	1
2025	SSV	(Canada) Can-Am	4th	0
