= 2018 Le Mans Cup =

Motorsport season

The 2018 Le Mans Cup, known as the 2018 Michelin Le Mans Cup under sponsorship, was the third season of the Le Mans Cup. It began on 12 May at the Autodromo Nazionale Monza and finished on 27 October at the Algarve International Circuit. The series was open to Le Mans Prototypes in the LMP3 class, and grand tourer sports cars in the GT3 class.

== Calendar ==
All races supported the 2018 European Le Mans Series except the Le Mans round, which was part of the 24 Hours of Le Mans weekend.

Round	Circuit	Location	Race length	Date
1	(France) Circuit Paul Ricard	Le Castellet, France	2 hours	14 April
2	(Italy) Autodromo Nazionale Monza	Monza, Italy	2 hours	12 May
3	(France) Circuit de la Sarthe	Le Mans, France	55 minutes	14 June
3	(France) Circuit de la Sarthe	Le Mans, France	55 minutes	16 June
4	(Austria) Red Bull Ring	Spielberg, Austria	2 hours	22 July
5	(Belgium) Circuit de Spa-Francorchamps	Spa, Belgium	2 hours	22 September
6	(Portugal) Algarve International Circuit	Portimão, Portugal	2 hours	27 October

== Entry list ==
=== LMP3 ===
Team	Car	No.	Drivers	Rounds
(Luxembourg) DKR Engineering	Norma M30	1	(Republic of Ireland) Dan Polley	3
(Luxembourg) DKR Engineering	Norma M30	1	(United Kingdom) James Winslow	3
(Luxembourg) DKR Engineering	Norma M30	3	(Netherlands) Leonard Hoogenboom	All
(Luxembourg) DKR Engineering	Norma M30	3	(Germany) Jens Petersen	All
(United Kingdom) Ecurie Ecosse/Nielsen	Ligier JS P3	2	(United Kingdom) James Littlejohn	All
(United Kingdom) Ecurie Ecosse/Nielsen	Ligier JS P3	2	(United Kingdom) Anthony Wells	All
(United Kingdom) Ecurie Ecosse/Nielsen	Ligier JS P3	74	(United Kingdom) Patrick McClughan	3
(United Kingdom) Ecurie Ecosse/Nielsen	Ligier JS P3	74	(United States) Gerhard Watzinger	3
(United Kingdom) Ecurie Ecosse/Nielsen	Ligier JS P3	75	(United Kingdom) Ivor Dunbar	3
(United Kingdom) Ecurie Ecosse/Nielsen	Ligier JS P3	75	(United Kingdom) Bonamy Grimes	3
(United Kingdom) Ecurie Ecosse/Nielsen	Ligier JS P3	76	(United Kingdom) Alex Kapadia	3
(United Kingdom) Ecurie Ecosse/Nielsen	Ligier JS P3	76	(Denmark) Christian Olsen	3
(United Kingdom) Ecurie Ecosse/Nielsen	Ligier JS P3	79	(United Kingdom) Alasdair McCaig	All
(United Kingdom) Ecurie Ecosse/Nielsen	Ligier JS P3	79	(United Kingdom) Colin Noble	All
(United Kingdom) Brookspeed International	Ligier JS P3	4	(France) Nicolas Rondet	All
(United Kingdom) Brookspeed International	Ligier JS P3	4	(United States) John Schauerman	All
(Spain) NEFIS By Speed Factory	Ligier JS P3	5	(Russia) Timur Boguslavskiy	3
(Spain) NEFIS By Speed Factory	Ligier JS P3	5	(Switzerland) Marcello Marateotto	3
(Switzerland) Cool Racing	Norma M30	9	(Australia) Scott Andrews	3–4
(Switzerland) Cool Racing	Norma M30	9	(United States) Gerald Kraut	3–4
(Switzerland) Cool Racing	Ligier JS P3	9	(Australia) Scott Andrews	2
(Switzerland) Cool Racing	Ligier JS P3	9	(United States) Gerald Kraut	2
(Switzerland) Cool Racing	Ligier JS P3	24	(Switzerland) Antonin Borga	All
(Switzerland) Cool Racing	Ligier JS P3	24	(Switzerland) Alexandre Coigny	All
(Switzerland) Cool Racing	Ligier JS P3	27	(France) Marvin Klein	3
(Switzerland) Cool Racing	Ligier JS P3	27	(Switzerland) Christian Vaglio	3
(United States) Eurointernational	Ligier JS P3	11	(Denmark) Mikkel Jensen	3
(United States) Eurointernational	Ligier JS P3	11	(Netherlands) Kay van Berlo	3
(United States) Eurointernational	Ligier JS P3	12	(Canada) James Dayson	3
(United States) Eurointernational	Ligier JS P3	12	(United States) Mark Kvamme	3
(United Kingdom) RLR MSport	Ligier JS P3	14	(Canada) John Farano	All
(United Kingdom) RLR MSport	Ligier JS P3	14	(Netherlands) Job Van Uitert	All
(United Kingdom) RLR MSport	Ligier JS P3	59	(Australia) Josh Burdon	3
(United Kingdom) RLR MSport	Ligier JS P3	59	(China) Neric Wei	3
(United Kingdom) RLR MSport	Ligier JS P3	59	(United Kingdom) Alex Kapadia	4–6
(United Kingdom) RLR MSport	Ligier JS P3	59	(United Kingdom) Ross Warburton	4–6
(France) M.Racing - YMR	Ligier JS P3	15	(United States) Jon Bennett	3
(France) M.Racing - YMR	Ligier JS P3	15	(Sweden) Niclas Jönsson	3
(France) M.Racing - YMR	Norma M30	16	(France) Natan Bihel	3
(France) M.Racing - YMR	Norma M30	16	(France) Laurent Millara	3
(Italy) RGP Motorsport	Ligier JS P3	17	(Italy) Marco Cencetti	1, 3
(Italy) RGP Motorsport	Ligier JS P3	17	(Greece) Ioannis Inglessis	1, 3
(France) Ultimate	Norma M30	19	(France) François Hériau	3
(France) Ultimate	Norma M30	19	(France) Jean-Baptiste Lahaye	3
(France) DB Autosport	Norma M30	20	(France) Jean-Ludovic Foubert	All
(France) DB Autosport	Norma M30	20	(Switzerland) Nicolas Maulini	All
(France) DB Autosport	Norma M30	21	(France) Nicolas Schatz	All
(France) DB Autosport	Norma M30	21	(France) Jacques Wolff	All
(United States) United Autosports	Ligier JS P3	22	(United Kingdom) Matthew Bell	All
(United States) United Autosports	Ligier JS P3	22	(United States) Jim McGuire	All
(United States) United Autosports	Ligier JS P3	23	(United Kingdom) Richard Meins	All
(United States) United Autosports	Ligier JS P3	23	(United Kingdom) Christian England	1–2, 4–6
(United States) United Autosports	Ligier JS P3	23	(United Kingdom) Shaun Lynn	3
(United States) United Autosports	Ligier JS P3	32	(United States) Najaf Husain	All
(United States) United Autosports	Ligier JS P3	32	(India) Mahaveer Raghunathan	1
(United States) United Autosports	Ligier JS P3	32	(United States) Colin Braun	2–6
(United States) United Autosports	Ligier JS P3	33	(United States) John Falb	3
(United States) United Autosports	Ligier JS P3	33	(United States) Sean Rayhall	3
(United Kingdom) Lanan Racing	Norma M30	25	(United Kingdom) Michael Benham	All
(United Kingdom) Lanan Racing	Norma M30	25	(United Kingdom) Duncan Tappy	All
(France) CD Sport	Norma M30	30	(Germany) Laurents Hörr	All
(France) CD Sport	Norma M30	30	(France) Anthony Pons	1, 3, 5
(France) CD Sport	Norma M30	30	(France) Eric Debard	2
(France) CD Sport	Norma M30	30	(France) Fabien Lavergne	4, 6
(France) CD Sport	Norma M30	60	(France) Nicolas Mélin	3
(France) CD Sport	Norma M30	60	(France) Julien Piguet	3
(France) Graff	Norma M30	39	(France) Adrien Trouillet	All
(France) Graff	Norma M30	39	(France) Eric Trouillet	All
(France) Graff	Norma M30	40	(France) Adrien Chila	3–6
(France) Graff	Norma M30	40	(France) Marc-Antoine Dannielou	3-6
(France) Graff	Norma M30	65	(France) Damien Delafosse	3–6
(France) Graff	Norma M30	65	(Brazil) Sergio Pasian	3-4
(France) Graff	Norma M30	65	(France) François Hériau	5
(France) Graff	Norma M30	65	(Sweden) Alexander West	6
(France) Graff	Ligier JS P3	40	(France) Adrien Chila	1–2
(France) Graff	Ligier JS P3	40	(France) Marc-Antoine Dannielou	1–2
(France) Graff	Ligier JS P3	65	(France) Damien Delafosse	1–2
(France) Graff	Ligier JS P3	65	(Brazil) Sergio Pasian	1–2
(Denmark) Keo Racing	Ligier JS P3	43	(Denmark) Johan Jokinen	6
(Denmark) Keo Racing	Ligier JS P3	43	(Germany) Paul Scheuschner	6
(Spain) SPV Racing	Ligier JS P3	44	(Mexico) Ricardo Sanchez	1–3
(Spain) SPV Racing	Ligier JS P3	44	(Spain) Álvaro Fontes	1, 3
(Spain) SPV Racing	Ligier JS P3	44	(United Kingdom) Andy Cummings	2
(Spain) SPV Racing	Ligier JS P3	45	(United Kingdom) Andy Cummings	3
(Spain) SPV Racing	Ligier JS P3	45	(United Kingdom) Bradley Ellis	3
(Hong Kong) Win Motorsport	Ligier JS P3	49	(Hong Kong) William Lok	3
(Hong Kong) Win Motorsport	Ligier JS P3	49	(United States) Jim Michaelian	3
(Switzerland) Spirit of Race	Ligier JS P3	55	(United Kingdom) Chris Buncombe	3
(Switzerland) Spirit of Race	Ligier JS P3	55	(United States) Patrick Byrne	3
(France) TFT - SO24	Norma M30	72	(France) Arnold Robin	3
(France) TFT - SO24	Norma M30	72	(France) Maxime Robin	3
(France) TFT - SO24	Norma M30	73	(France) Xavier Michel	3
(France) TFT - SO24	Norma M30	73	(France) Antoine Weil	3
(Austria) AT Racing	Ligier JS P3	90	(Belarus) Alexander Talkanitsa, Jr.	3
(Austria) AT Racing	Ligier JS P3	90	(Belarus) Alexander Talkanitsa, Sr.	3
(Japan) TKS	Ginetta-Juno LMP3	96	(Japan) Shinyo Sano	1–3
(Japan) TKS	Ginetta-Juno LMP3	96	(Italy) Luca Magnoni	1
(Japan) TKS	Ginetta-Juno LMP3	96	(Japan) Teruaki Kato	2
(Japan) TKS	Ginetta-Juno LMP3	96	(Japan) Takuya Shirasaka	3
(Belgium) Motorsport 98	Ligier JS P3	98	(Belgium) Eric de Doncker	All
(Belgium) Motorsport 98	Ligier JS P3	98	(United Kingdom) Andy Meyrick	1
(Belgium) Motorsport 98	Ligier JS P3	98	(France) Dino Lunardi	2–6
(France) N'Race	Ligier JS P3	99	(France) Thomas Accary	1–3
(France) N'Race	Ligier JS P3	99	(Monaco) Alain Costa	1–5
(France) N'Race	Ligier JS P3	99	(France) Johan-Boris Scheier	4–5

=== GT3 ===
Team	Car	No.	Drivers	Rounds
(Switzerland) Kessel Racing	Ferrari 488 GT3	8	(Italy) Sergio Pianezzola	All
(Switzerland) Kessel Racing	Ferrari 488 GT3	8	(Italy) Giacomo Piccini	All
(Switzerland) Kessel Racing	Ferrari 488 GT3	50	(United Kingdom) Ollie Hancock	1–3, 6
(Switzerland) Kessel Racing	Ferrari 488 GT3	50	(United Kingdom) John Hartshorne	1–3, 6
(Switzerland) Kessel Racing	Ferrari 488 GT3	50	(Russia) Murod Sultanov	5
(Switzerland) Kessel Racing	Ferrari 488 GT3	50	(Italy) Matteo Cressoni	5
(Switzerland) Kessel Racing	Ferrari 488 GT3	77	(Italy) Andrea Piccini	All
(Switzerland) Kessel Racing	Ferrari 488 GT3	77	(Italy) Claudio Schiavoni	All
(Switzerland) Kessel Racing	Ferrari 488 GT3	83	(Italy) Manuela Gostner	6
(Switzerland) Kessel Racing	Ferrari 488 GT3	83	(Italy) Giorgio Sernagiotto	6
(Italy) Krypton Motorsport	Mercedes-AMG GT3	35	(Italy) Stefano Pezzucchi	4
(Italy) Krypton Motorsport	Mercedes-AMG GT3	35	(Italy) Marco Zanuttini	4
(Switzerland) (Italy) / Spirit of Race (Note: Car Nos. 51 and 54 entered as Spirit of Race and Car No. 71 entered as AF Corse.); (Switzerland) (Italy) / AF Corse	Ferrari 488 GT3	51	(Italy) Maurizio Mediani	All
(Switzerland) (Italy) / Spirit of Race; (Switzerland) (Italy) / AF Corse	Ferrari 488 GT3	51	(Switzerland) Christoph Ulrich	All
(Switzerland) (Italy) / Spirit of Race; (Switzerland) (Italy) / AF Corse	Ferrari 488 GT3	54	(Belgium) Louis Soenen	3
(Switzerland) (Italy) / Spirit of Race; (Switzerland) (Italy) / AF Corse	Ferrari 488 GT3	54	(Belgium) Frédéric Vervisch	3
(Switzerland) (Italy) / Spirit of Race; (Switzerland) (Italy) / AF Corse	Ferrari 488 GT3	71	(Italy) Marco Cioci	All
(Switzerland) (Italy) / Spirit of Race; (Switzerland) (Italy) / AF Corse	Ferrari 488 GT3	71	(Italy) Piergiuseppe Perazzini	All
(San Marino) StileF Squadra Corse	Ferrari 458 Italia GT3	69	(Switzerland) Martin Grab	1, 3
(San Marino) StileF Squadra Corse	Ferrari 458 Italia GT3	69	(Switzerland) Yoshiki Ohmura	1
(San Marino) StileF Squadra Corse	Ferrari 458 Italia GT3	69	(Switzerland) Gino Forgione	3
(Italy) Ebimotors	Porsche 911 GT3 R	88	(Italy) Alessandro Baccani	All
(Italy) Ebimotors	Porsche 911 GT3 R	88	(Italy) Paolo Venerosi	All

== Race results ==
Bold indicates overall winner.

Rnd.		Circuit	LMP3 Winning Team	GT3 Winning Team
Rnd.		Circuit	LMP3 Winning Drivers	GT3 Winning Drivers
1		(France) Paul Ricard	**(Luxembourg) No. 3 DKR Engineering**	(Switzerland) No. 8 Kessel Racing
1		(France) Paul Ricard	**(Netherlands) Leonard Hoogenboom** **(Germany) Jens Petersen**	(Italy) Sergio Pianezzola (Italy) Giacomo Piccini
2		(Italy) Monza	**(Luxembourg) No. 3 DKR Engineering**	(Switzerland) No. 8 Kessel Racing
2		(Italy) Monza	**(Netherlands) Leonard Hoogenboom** **(Germany) Jens Petersen**	(Italy) Sergio Pianezzola (Italy) Giacomo Piccini
3	R1	(France) Le Mans (report)	**(United States) No. 11 Eurointernational**	(Italy) No. 71 AF Corse
3	R1	(France) Le Mans (report)	**(Denmark) Mikkel Jensen** **(Netherlands) Kay van Berlo**	(Italy) Marco Cioci (Italy) Piergiuseppe Perazzini
3	R2	(France) Le Mans (report)	**(United Kingdom) No. 25 Lanan Racing**	(Switzerland) No. 51 Spirit of Race
3	R2	(France) Le Mans (report)	**(United Kingdom) Michael Benham** **(United Kingdom) Duncan Tappy**	(Italy) Maurizio Mediani (Switzerland) Christoph Ulrich
4		(Austria) Red Bull Ring	**(Luxembourg) No. 3 DKR Engineering**	(Switzerland) No. 8. Kessel Racing
4		(Austria) Red Bull Ring	**(Netherlands) Leonard Hoogenboom** **(Germany) Jens Petersen**	(Italy) Sergio Pianezzola (Italy) Giacomo Piccini
5		(Belgium) Spa	**(United Kingdom) No. 79 Ecurie Ecosse/Nielsen**	(Switzerland) No. 8 Kessel Racing
5		(Belgium) Spa	**(United Kingdom) Alasdair McCaig** **(United Kingdom) Colin Noble**	(Italy) Sergio Pianezzola (Italy) Giacomo Piccini
6		(Portugal) Portimão	**(United Kingdom) No. 79 Ecurie Ecosse/Nielsen**	(Switzerland) No. 8 Kessel Racing
6		(Portugal) Portimão	**(United Kingdom) Alasdair McCaig** **(United Kingdom) Colin Noble**	(Italy) Sergio Pianezzola (Italy) Giacomo Piccini

== Standings ==
Points are awarded according to the following structure (except Le Mans):

Position	**1st**	**2nd**	**3rd**	**4th**	**5th**	**6th**	**7th**	**8th**	**9th**	**10th**	**Other**	**Pole**
Points	25	18	15	12	10	8	6	4	2	1	0.5	1

For Le Mans:

Position	**1st**	**2nd**	**3rd**	**4th**	**5th**	**6th**	**7th**	**8th**	**9th**	**10th**	**Other**	**Pole**
Points	15	9	7	6	5	4	3	2	1	0.5	0.5	1

=== LMP3 Teams Championship ===
Pos.	Team	Car	LEC (France)	MNZ (Italy)	LMS (France)		RBR (Austria)	SPA (Belgium)	POR (Portugal)	Points
1	(Luxembourg) #3 DKR Engineering	Norma M30	1	1	3	4	1	3	Ret	103
2	(United Kingdom) #79 Ecurie Ecosse/Nielsen	Ligier JS P3	2	?	5	?	2	1	1	91.5
3	(United Kingdom) #2 Ecurie Ecosse/Nielsen	Ligier JS P3	3	2	?	?	10	2	3	68.5
4	(France) #40 Graff	Norma M30	8	5	7	5	3	7	?	43.5
5	(Belgium) #98 Motorsport 98	Ligier JS P3	10	8	?	10	7	4	4	36.5

Key
Colour	Result
Gold	Race winner
Silver	2nd place
Bronze	3rd place
Green	Points finish
Blue	Non-points finish
Blue	Non-classified finish (NC)
Purple	Did not finish (Ret)
Black	Disqualified (DSQ)
Black	Excluded (EX)
White	Did not start (DNS)
White	Race cancelled (C)
White	Withdrew (WD)
Blank	Did not participate

**Bold** – Pole
