= Adrien Chila =

French racing driver (born 1975)

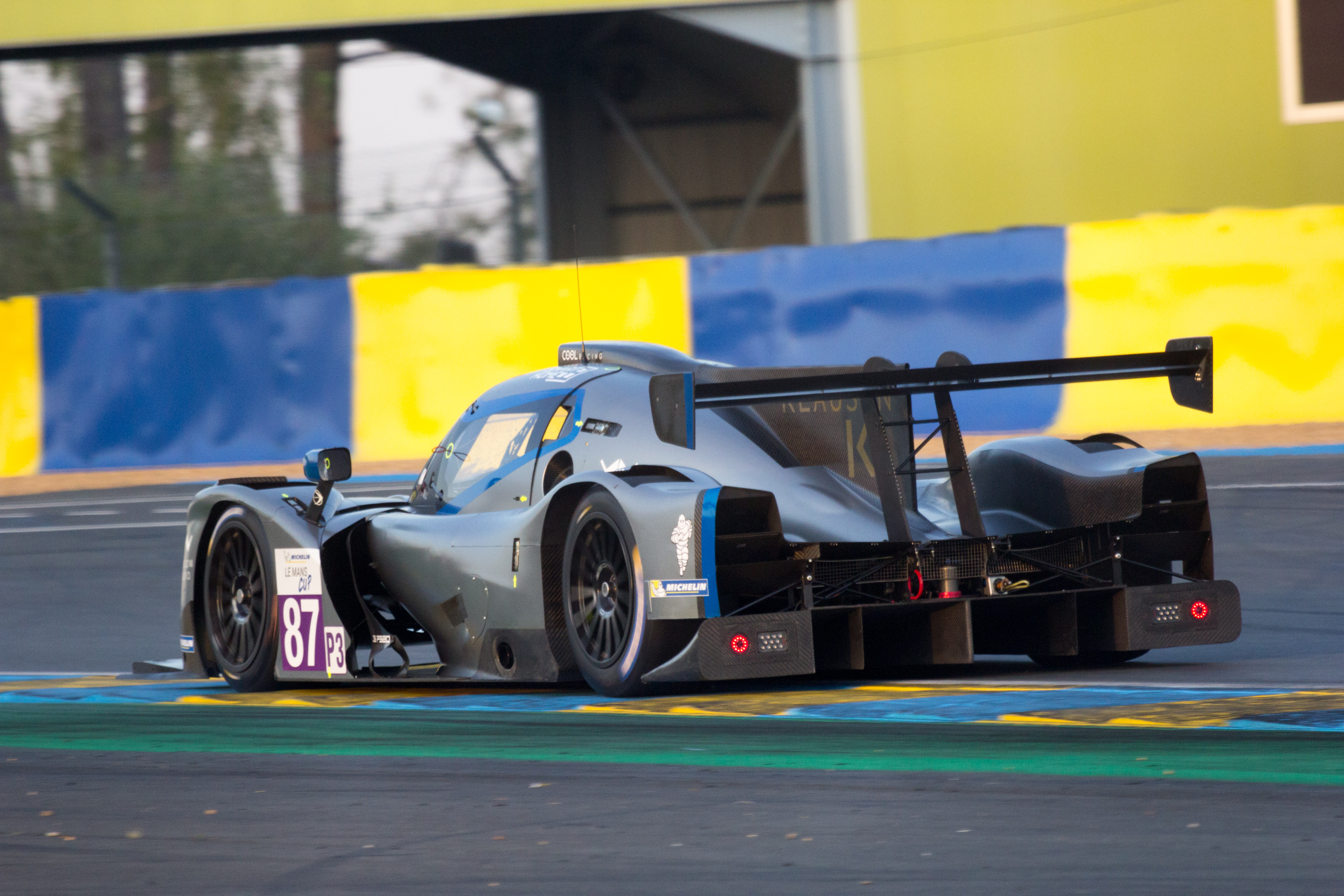
- Chila in 2023
- Nationality: (France) French
- Born: 28 October 1975 (age 51) Montpellier, France
- Categorisation: FIA Bronze

Championship titles
- 2024 2023: Le Mans Cup – LMP3; European Le Mans Series – LMP3

Adrien Chila (born 28 October 1975) is a French racing driver who last competed in the European Endurance Prototype Cup for ANS Motorsport.

== Career ==
Chila began his racing career in 2013, racing in Mitjet 2L for AGS Events. After select appearances across 2015 and 2016 in V de V and the Gulf 12 Hours in the latter year for Graff, Chila remained with Graff to compete in the Le Mans Cup the following year alongside Émilien Carde. In his first season in the series, Chila took a pair of third-place finishes at the Red Bull Ring and Le Castellet to end the year fourth in points. Staying with Graff for 2018 alongside Marc-Antoine Dannielou, Chila scored a best result of third at the Red Bull Ring en route to a fourth-place points finish for the second year in a row.

Continuing with Graff for 2019, Chila remained in the Le Mans Cup as he was joined by Nicolas Schatz. In his third season in the series, Chila scored his maiden win in race one at Le Mans and finished third in race two, helping him to once again finish fourth in points. Chila then raced in the Ultimate Cup Series Challenge Monoplace the following year for the same team, scoring six podiums and finishing third in points. In 2021, Chila returned to endurance racing, competing in the LMP3 class of the European Le Mans Series for MV2S Racing. After taking a best result of sixth at Monza, Chila returned to the series the following year with EuroInternational. Having competed in the first three races, Chila then left the team ahead of the Barcelona round and made a one-off appearance in the European Endurance Prototype Cup for ANS Motorsport at Magny-Cours.

Switching to Cool Racing for 2023, Chila raced them full-time in the LMP3 class of the Asian Le Mans, Le Mans Cup and the European Le Mans. Paired up with Cédric Oltramare and Marcos Siebert for the former, Chila took a best result of second in the Abu Dhabi finale to round out the season eighth in points. Racing alongside Oltramare in Le Mans Cup, the pair scored a best result of second at Le Castellet to end the year fifth in points. Competing with Siebert and Alex García in the latter, the trio took wins at Barcelona, Aragón and Spa and two other podiums to secure the ELMS LMP3 title.

Remaining with Cool Racing to race in Le Mans Cup alongside David Droux in 2024, the pair scored a lone win at Le Castellet, and one other podium to edge out R-ace GP to the LMP3 title by 5.5 points. The following year, Chila joined ANS Motorsport to race in the European Endurance Prototype Cup. Driving alongside Belén García and Paul Trojani for the first five rounds, Chila finished third at Le Castellet, before taking his season-best result of second at Mugello en route to a sixth-place points finish.

In 2026, Chila returned to ANS Motorsport for his second full-time season in the European Endurance Prototype Cup.

== Racing record ==
=== Racing career summary ===
Season	Series	Team	Races	Wins	Poles	F/Laps	Podiums	Points	Position
2013	Mitjet 2L	AGS Events	12	0	0	0	0	188	36th
2015	V de V Challenge Endurance Moderne – Scratch	Graff	2	0	0	0	0	19.5	29th
2016	Gulf 12 Hours – Prototype	Graff	1	0	0	0	0	—N/a	4th
2016	Challenge Endurance LMP3 LMP2 V de V	Graff	4	0	0	0	1	127.5	8th
2016	V de V Challenge Endurance Moderne – Prototype	Graff	3	0	0	0	0	5.75	31st
2017	Gulf 12 Hours – LMP3 Pro-Am	Graff	1	0	0	0	0	—N/a	5th
2017	Le Mans Cup – LMP3	Graff	7	0	0	0	2	62.5	4th
2018	Le Mans Cup – LMP3	Graff	7	0	0	0	1	43.5	4th
2018	V de V Endurance Series – LMP3	Graff	2	0	0	0	1	46	34th
2019	Le Mans Cup – LMP3	Graff	7	1	1	0	2	49.5	4th
2020	Ultimate Cup Series Challenge Monoplace	Graff	12	0	0	0	6	258	**3rd**
2021	European Le Mans Series – LMP3	MV2S Racing	6	0	0	0	0	14.5	20th
2022	European Le Mans Series – LMP3	EuroInternational	3	0	0	0	0	0	23rd
2022	European Endurance Prototype Cup – NP02	ANS Motorsport	1	0	0	0	0	0	9th
2023	Asian Le Mans Series – LMP3	Cool Racing	4	0	0	0	1	26	8th
2023	Le Mans Cup – LMP3	Cool Racing	7	0	1	0	1	42	5th
2023	European Le Mans Series – LMP3	Cool Racing	6	3	1	0	5	121	**1st**
2024	Le Mans Cup – LMP3	Cool Racing	7	1	0	0	2	73.5	**1st**
2025	European Endurance Prototype Cup	ANS Motorsport	5	0	0	0	2	49.5	6th
2026	European Endurance Prototype Cup	ANS Motorsport	5	2	1	2	3	92.5*	**1st***

=== Complete Le Mans Cup results ===
(key) (Races in bold indicate pole position; results in italics indicate fastest lap)

Year	Entrant	Class	Chassis	1	2	3	4	5	6	7	Rank	Points
2017	Graff	LMP3	Ligier JS P3	MNZ; 4	LMS; 1; 13	LMS; 2; 8	RBR; 3	LEC; 3	SPA; 5	POR; 6	4th	62.5
2018	Graff	LMP3	Ligier JS P3	LEC; 8	MNZ; 5						4th	43.5
2018	Graff	LMP3	Norma M30			LMS; 1; 7	LMS; 2; 5	RBR; 3	SPA; 7	ALG; 13	4th	43.5
2019	Graff	LMP3	Norma M30	LEC; 6	MNZ; 15	LMS; 1; 1	LMS; 2; 3	**CAT**; 4	SPA; DSQ	ALG; 7	4th	49.5
2023	Cool Racing	LMP3	Ligier JS P320	CAT; 6	LMS; 1; 10	LMS; 2 Ret	**LEC**; 2	ARA; 4	SPA; Ret	ALG; 10	5th	42
2024	Cool Racing	LMP3	Ligier JS P320	CAT; 5	LEC; 1	LMS; 1; 4	LMS; 2; 2	SPA; 9	MUG; 4	ALG; 4	1st	73.5

=== Complete European Le Mans Series results ===
(key) (Races in bold indicate pole position; results in italics indicate fastest lap)

Year	Entrant	Class	Chassis	Engine	1	2	3	4	5	6	Rank	Points
2021	MV2S Racing	LMP3	Ligier JS P320	Nissan VK56DE 5.6L V8	CAT; NC	RBR; 7	LEC; 11	MNZ; 6	SPA; NC	ALG; NC	20th	14.5
2022	Eurointernational	LMP3	Ligier JS P320	Nissan VK56DE 5.6 L V8	LEC; Ret	IMO; Ret	MNZ; NC	CAT	SPA	ALG	23rd	0
2023	Cool Racing	LMP3	Ligier JS P320	Nissan VK56DE 5.6 L V8	**CAT**; 1	LEC; 3	ARA; 1	SPA; 1	ALG; 4	ALG; 2	1st	121

=== Complete Asian Le Mans Series results ===
(key) (Races in bold indicate pole position) (Races in italics indicate fastest lap)

Year	Team	Class	Car	Engine	1	2	3	4	Pos.	Points
2023	Cool Racing	LMP3	Ligier JS P320	Nissan VK56DE 5.6L V8	DUB; 1; 14	DUB; 2 Ret	ABU; 1; 6	ABU; 2; 2	8th	26
