= Alex Kapadia =

British racing driver (born 1980)

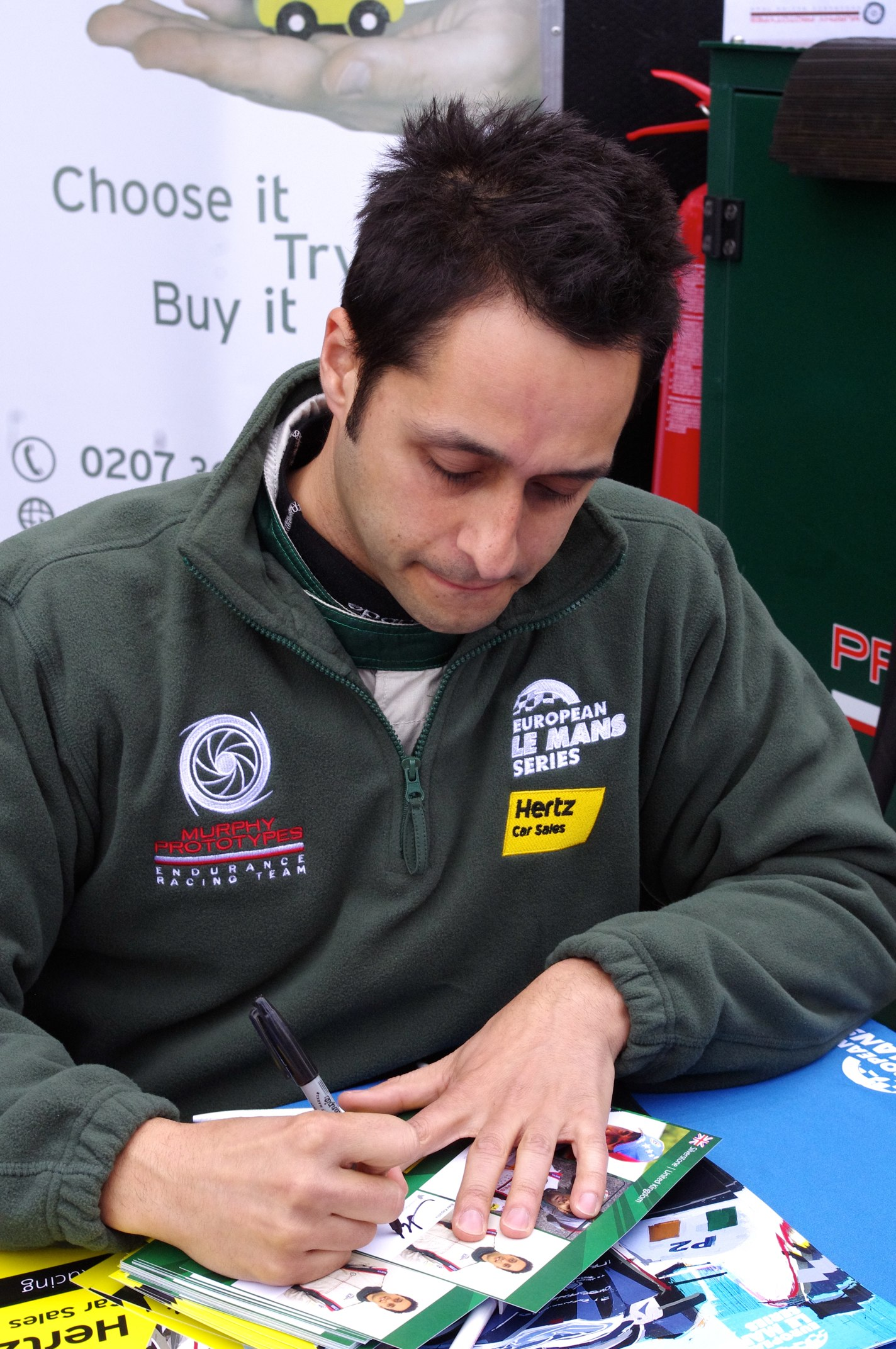
- Kapadia in 2014
- Nationality: (United Kingdom) British
- Born: 4 June 1980 (age 46) Aylesbury, England
- Categorisation: FIA Gold (until 2012); FIA Silver (2013–)

Championship titles
- 2020 2009 1999: Sports Prototype Cup – Revolution Trophy; Radical European Masters – SR8; Formula Eurofirst

Alexis Kapadia (born 4 June 1980) is a British businessman and racing driver who last competed in the LMP3 class of the European Le Mans Series for RLR MSport.

== Business ventures ==
Since 2003, Kapadia has been the owner of two Bargain Booze franchises in Dunstable, as well as three Wine Rack franchises since 2014. Kapadia also has been the Managing Director of Freedom Convenience since 2018.

== Career ==
Kapadia began racing single-seaters in 1998, racing in the Formula First UK Winter Series for Mark Burdett Motorsport, before winning the Formula Eurofirst title the following year. After that, Kapadia continued in single-seaters for the following three seasons, most notably racing in select rounds of the Formula Renault 2.0 UK Championship in 2000 and 2002.

Returning to racing on a full-time basis in 2008, Kapadia raced in the Supersport class of the Radical UK Cup, scoring six wins and finishing runner-up in the class' standings. Transitioning to the Radical European Masters for the following year, Kapadia won eight races to secure the SR8 title. Kapadia then won the 2010 Dubai 24 Hour in the SP3 class, before finishing second in the following year's edition, also in the SP3 class. During 2011, Kapadia also made his debut in the Le Mans Series, racing for Neil Garner Motorsport at the 6 Hours of Estoril, in which he finished third in the FLM class after starting on pole.

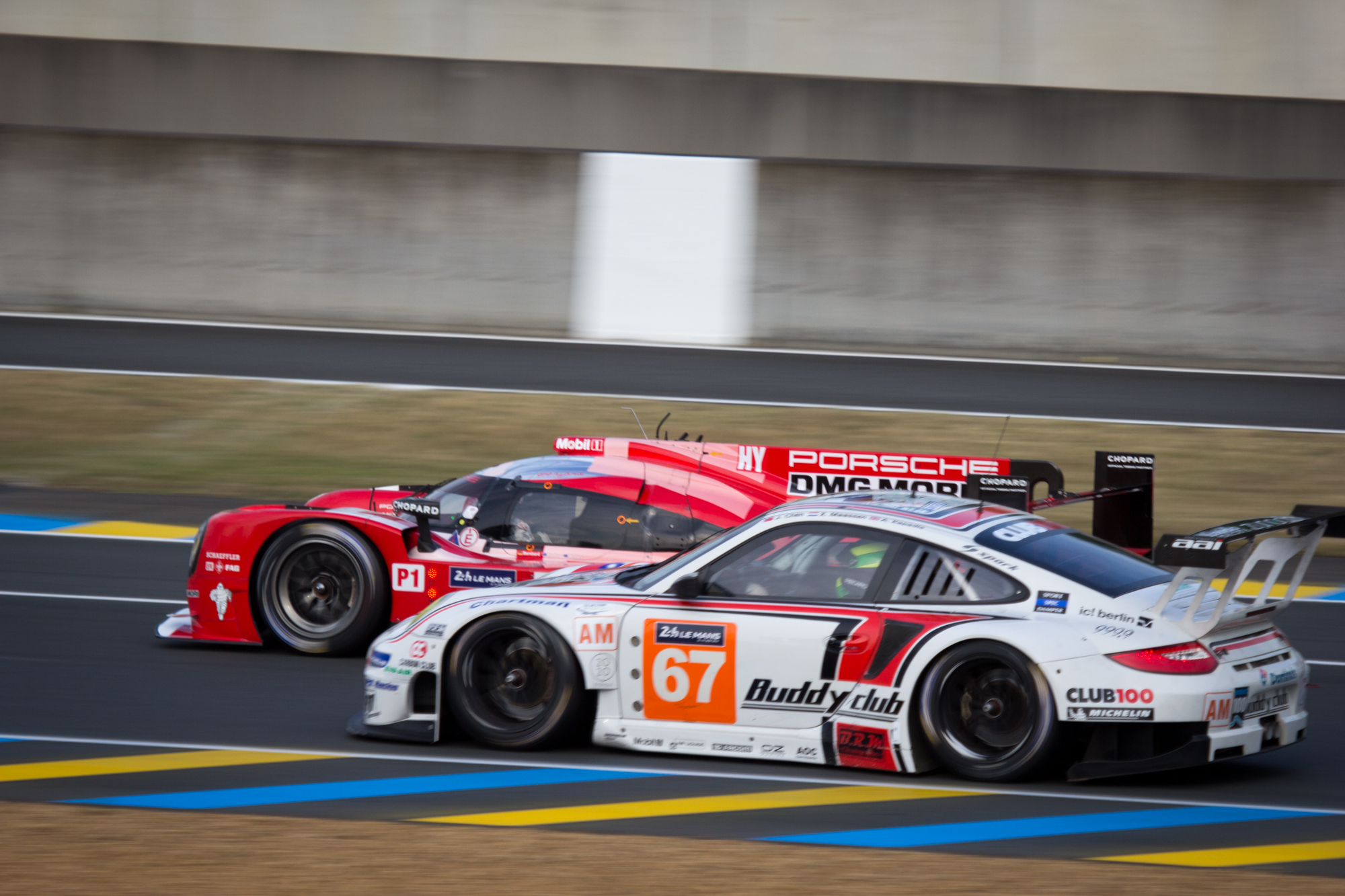
Kapadia's AAI Porsche getting lapped by a Porsche 919 Hybrid LMP1 at the 2015 24 Hours of Le Mans.

The following year, Kapadia joined Curtis Racing Technologies to race at the season-opening 6 Hours of Castellet of the European Le Mans Series, which he won in the LMPC class. After not racing for most of 2013, Kapadia joined Boutsen Ginion Racing to compete in the last two rounds of the European Le Mans Series in the LMP2 class, taking a best result of fifth at Le Castellet. Kapadia then primarily raced in the Radical European Masters for across the following two years, during which he raced in the 2014 4 Hours of Silverstone for Murphy Prototypes in LMP2, as well as the 2015 24 Hours of Le Mans for Team AAI in LMGTE Am. In late 2015, Kapadia returned to Team AAI for a one-off cameo in the 2015–16 Asian Le Mans Series at the first Sepang race, in which he finished second in LMP3.

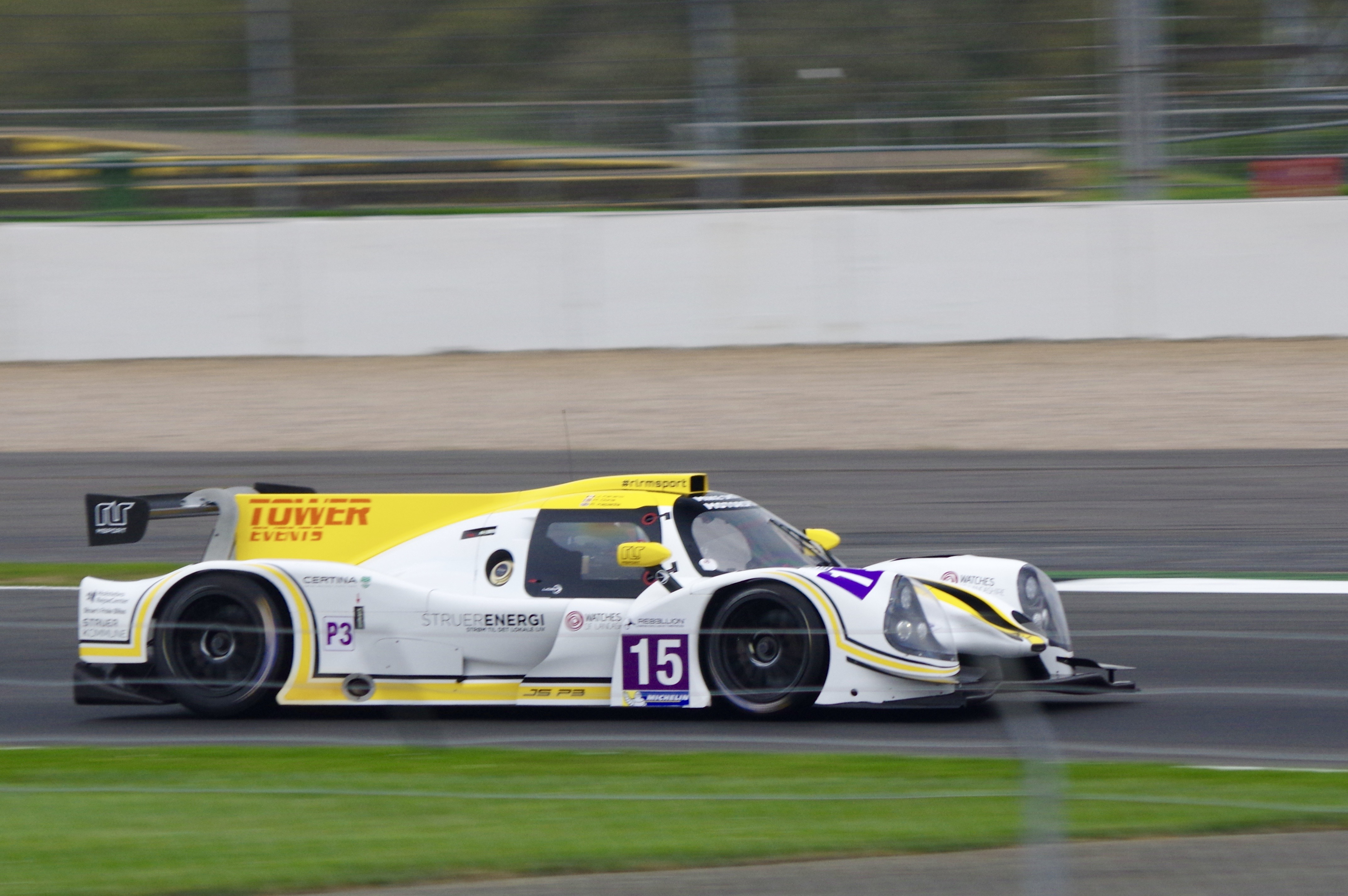
Kapadia signed for RLR MSport in 2017 as he turned his focus to the LMP3 class.

Another season in the Radical European Masters then ensued in 2016, as well as racing in the Bathurst 12 Hour for Mishumotors and the Road to Le Mans for Duqueine Engineering, along with a one-off appearance in the European Le Mans Series for Murphy Prototypes. The following year, Kapadia joined RLR MSport to race in both the LMP3 class of the Le Mans Cup and the European Le Mans Series. Scoring a best result of sixth at Algarve and finishing 13th in the former's points, Kapadia found more success in the latter, scoring a lone podium at Le Mans and taking ninth in the standings. During 2017, Kapadia also made select appearances in the NASCAR Whelen Euro Series for Mishumotors, and the British LMP3 Cup for Nielsen Racing and T-Sport.

Switching to Ecurie Ecosse/Nielsen for the 2018 ELMS season, Kapadia took three second-place finished across the six-race season to finish fourth in the LMP3 standings. During 2018, Kapadia also raced in the Masters Endurance Legends and in select rounds of the Le Mans Cup for both Nielsen and RLR MSport. The following year, Kapadia only raced in the season-ending Algarve race of the Le Mans Cup season, which he won driving for RLR MSport. In 2020, Kapadia mainly raced in the Sports Prototype Cup for Breakell Racing, winning the Revolution Trophy title at season's end at Algarve. During 2020, Kapadia also raced in the LMP2 class of the 24 Hours of Le Mans for Nielsen Racing, and the final two rounds of the Le Mans Cup for Mühlner Motorsport, in which he finished on the podium at Algarve.

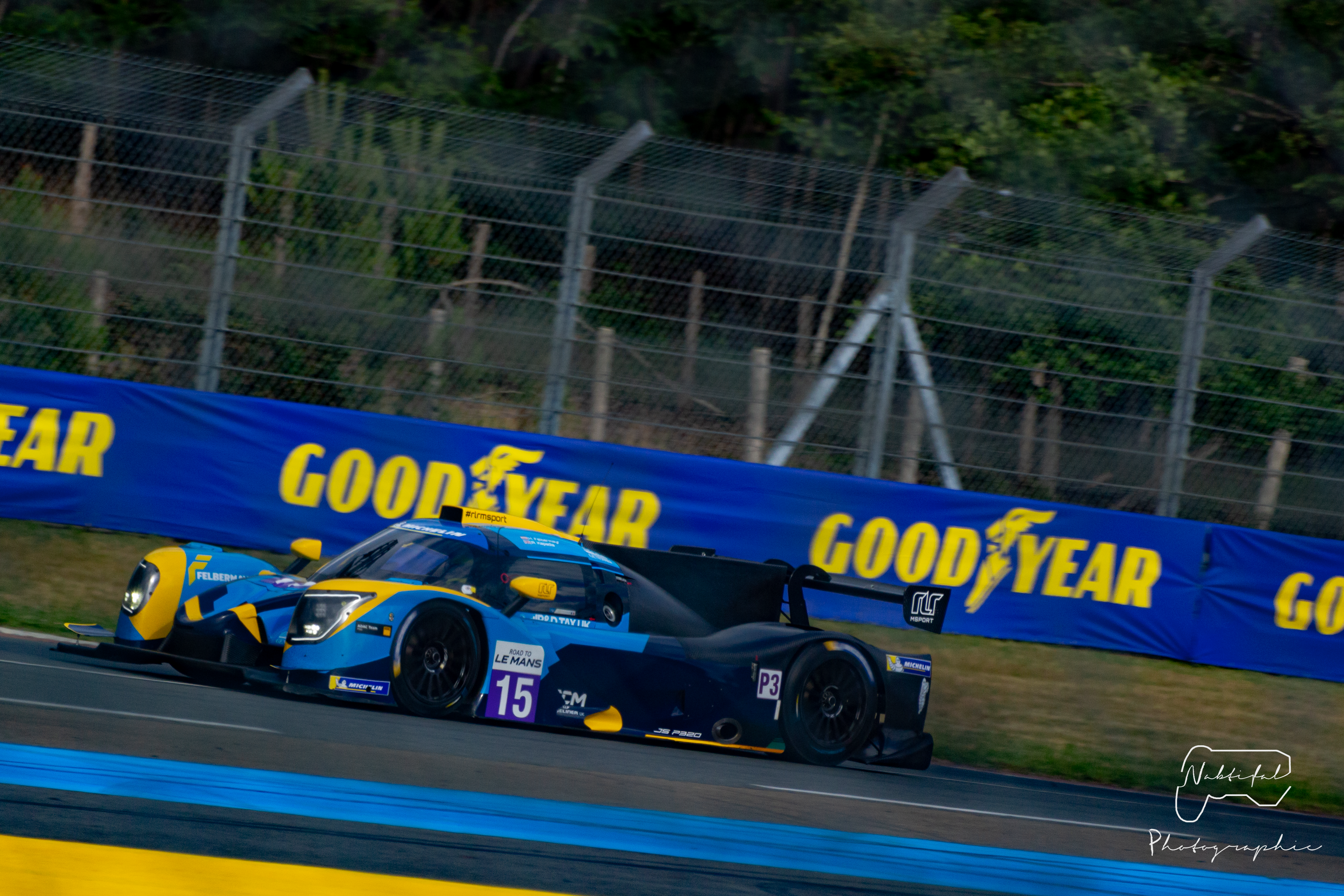
Kapadia at the 2022 Road to Le Mans.

Returning to RLR MSport and the European Le Mans Series for 2021, Kapadia scored a best result of second at Barcelona to end the year ninth in LMP3. During 2021, Kapadia also raced for the same team in the Road to Le Mans, as well as the Britcar Endurance Championship for Tim Gray Motorsport, who helped secure the Praga class title. Continuing with RLR MSport for 2022, Kapadia took a lone podium at Le Castellet and scored three other top five finishes en route to a fourth-place points finish. During 2022, Kapadia also raced with the same team at the Road to Le Mans with the same team alongside Horst Felbermayr Jr., finishing 16th and 21st in both races.

== Racing record ==
=== Racing career summary ===
Season	Series	Team	Races	Wins	Poles	F/Laps	Podiums	Points	Position
1998	Formula First UK Winter Series	Mark Burdett Motorsport	5	3	3	3	4		**2nd**
1999	Formula Eurofirst	Mark Burdett Motorsport	14	6	7	0	12	3060	**1st**
2000	British Formula Ford Championship		10	0	0	0	0		
2000	Formula Renault 2.0 UK Championship		4	0	0	0	0	16	29th
2001	Formula Renault UK Winter Series	Saxon International	4	0	0	0	1	67	4th
2002	Formula Renault 2.0 UK Championship	Saxon International	1	0	0	0	0	7	35th
2002	Formula Renault 2.0 Germany	SL Formula Racing	2	0	0	0	0	11	32nd
2004	Renault Clio Cup United Kingdom	Boulevard Team Racing	2	0	0	0	0	10	29th
2008	Radical UK Cup – Supersport	RPM	16	6	6	10	10	338	**2nd**
2008	Radical European Masters – SR3	RPM	4	3	2	3	4	119	5th
2009	Radical European Masters – SR8	Radical UK Works Team	10	8	5	6	8	273	**1st**
2010	Dubai 24 Hour – SP3	AUH Motorsports	1	1	0	0	1	—N/a	**1st**
2010	Radical UK Cup – Supersport							69	9th
2010	GT4 European Cup	AUH Motorsports	0	0	0	0	0	0	NC
2011	Dubai 24 Hour – SP3	HMR	1	0	0	0	1	—N/a	**2nd**
2011	Le Mans Series – FLM	Neil Garner Motorsport	1	0	0	0	1	12	13th
2012	European Le Mans Series – LMPC	CURTIS Racing Technologies	1	1	0	0	1	25	4th
2013	European Le Mans Series – LMP2	Boutsen Ginion Racing	2	0	0	0	0	16	13th
2014	Radical European Masters – Masters	Slim Racing	13	0	0	2	4	62	4th
2014	European Le Mans Series – LMP2	Murphy Prototypes	1	0	0	0	0	4	25th
2015	Radical European Masters – Masters	Nielsen Racing	10	0	2	2	9	151	10th
2015	24 Hours of Le Mans – LMGTE Am	Team AAI	1	0	0	0	0	—N/a	8th
2015	Gulf 12 Hours – Gent	Dragon Racing	1	0	0	0	0	—N/a	DNF
2015–16	Asian Le Mans Series – LMP3	Team AAI	1	0	0	0	1	18	4th
2016	Intercontinental GT Challenge	Mishumotors	1	0	0	0	0	0	NC
2016	24H Series – A6-Pro	Dragon Racing	1	0	0	0	0	0	NC
2016	Radical European Masters – Masters	Raw Motorsport	17	3	2	3	15		**2nd**
2016	European Le Mans Series – LMP3	MurphyP3-3Dimensional.com	1	0	0	0	0	0.5	34th
2016	Road to Le Mans – LMP3	Duqueine Engineering	1	0	0	0	0	—N/a	7th
2017	Le Mans Cup – LMP3	RLR MSport	7	0	0	0	1	28	9th
2017	European Le Mans Series – LMP3	RLR MSport	6	0	0	0	0	25	13th
2017	NASCAR Whelen Euro Series – Elite 1	Mishumotors	2	0	0	0	0	61	34th
2017	British LMP3 Cup	Nielsen Racing	2	0	0	0	0	22	11th
2017	British LMP3 Cup	T-Sport	2	0	0	0	0	22	11th
2017	Radical European Masters – Masters	Raw Motorsport	3	0	1	1	1		
2017	Goodwood Revival – RAC TT Celebration		1	0	0	0	0	—N/a	DNF
2018	European Le Mans Series – LMP3	Ecurie Ecosse/Nielsen	6	0	0	0	3	58	4th
2018	Le Mans Cup – LMP3	Ecurie Ecosse/Nielsen	2	0	0	0	0	4	28th
2018	Le Mans Cup – LMP3	RLR MSport	3	0	0	1	0	4	28th
2018	Masters Endurance Legends		8	3	3	3	7		
2019	Le Mans Cup – LMP3	RLR MSport	1	1	0	0	1	25	9th
2020	Sports Prototype Cup – Revolution Trophy	Breakell Racing	5	2	2	2	4		**1st**
2020	24 Hours of Le Mans – LMP2	Nielsen Racing	1	0	0	0	0	—N/a	16th
2020	Le Mans Cup – LMP3	Mühlner Motorsport	2	0	0	0	1	18	13th
2021	Britcar Endurance Championship – Praga	Tim Gray Motorsport	7	0	6	3	5	216‡	**1st‡**
2021	European Le Mans Series – LMP3	RLR MSport	6	0	0	0	1	32	9th
2021	Le Mans Cup – LMP3	RLR MSport	2	0	0	0	0	0	NC†
2022	European Le Mans Series – LMP3	RLR MSport	6	0	0	1	1	59	4th
2022	Le Mans Cup – LMP3	RLR MSport	2	0	0	0	0	0	NC†
2022	Praga Cup	Tim Gray Motorsport	3	0	0	3	0	57	12th

^{†} As Kapadia was a guest driver, he was ineligible to score points.

^{‡} Team standings.

=== Complete European Le Mans Series results ===
(key) (Races in bold indicate pole position; results in italics indicate fastest lap)

Year	Entrant	Class	Chassis	Engine	1	2	3	4	5	6	Rank	Points
2011	Neil Garner Motorsport	FLM	Oreca FLM09	General Motors 6.3 L V8	LEC	SPA	IMO	SIL	**EST**; 3		13th	12
2012	CURTIS Racing Technologies	LMPC	Oreca FLM09	Chevrolet LS3 6.2 L V8	LEC; 1	DON	PET				4th	25
2013	Boutsen Ginion Racing	LMP2	Oreca 03	Nissan VK45DE 4.5 L V8	SIL	IMO	RBR	HUN; 7	LEC; 5		13th	16
2014	Murphy Prototypes	LMP2	Oreca 03	Nissan VK45DE 4.5 L V8	SIL; 8	IMO	RBR	LEC	EST		25th	4
2016	MurphyP3-3Dimensional.com	LMP3	Ligier JS P3	Nissan VK50VE 5.0 L V8	SIL	IMO; 12	RBR	LEC	SPA	EST	34th	0.5
2017	RLR MSport	LMP3	Ligier JS P3	Nissan VK50VE 5.0 L V8	SIL; 8	MNZ; 10	RBR; 8	LEC; 7	SPA; 9	ALG; 6	13th	25
2018	Ecurie Ecosse/Nielsen	LMP3	Ligier JS P3	Nissan VK50VE 5.0 L V8	LEC; 9	MNZ; 10	RBR; 2	SIL; 2	SPA; 9	ALG; 2	4th	58
2021	RLR MSport	LMP3	Ligier JS P320	Nissan VK56DE 5.6L V8	CAT; 2	RBR; Ret	LEC; 4	MNZ; 9	SPA; Ret	ALG; Ret	9th	32
2022	RLR MSport	LMP3	Ligier JS P320	Nissan VK56DE 5.6L V8	LEC; 3	IMO; 4	MNZ; 4	CAT; 6	SPA; 9	ALG; 5	4th	59

=== Complete 24 Hours of Le Mans results ===
Year	Team	Co-Drivers	Car	Class	Laps	Pos.	Class Pos.
2015	(Taiwan) Team AAI	(Taiwan) Jun-San Chen (Netherlands) Xavier Maassen	Porsche 911 GT3-RSR	LMGTE Am	316	37th	8th
2020	(United Kingdom) Nielsen Racing	(Canada) Garett Grist (United Kingdom) Anthony Wells	Oreca 07-Gibson	LMP2	338	28th	16th

=== Complete Asian Le Mans Series results ===
(key) (Races in bold indicate pole position) (Races in italics indicate fastest lap)

Year	Team	Class	Car	Engine	1	2	3	4	Pos.	Points
2015–16	Team AAI	LMP3	ADESS-03	Nissan VK50 5.0 L V8	FUJ	SEP; 2	BUR	SEP	4th	18

=== Complete Le Mans Cup results ===
(key) (Races in bold indicate pole position; results in italics indicate fastest lap)

Year	Entrant	Class	Chassis	1	2	3	4	5	6	7	Rank	Points
2017	RLR MSport	LMP3	Ligier JS P3	MNZ; 7	LMS; 1; 3	LMS; 2 Ret	RBR; 5	LEC; 10	SPA; 9	POR; 10	9th	28
2018	Ecurie Ecosse/Nielsen	LMP3	Ligier JS P3	LEC	MNZ	LMS; 1; 8	LMS; 2; 12				28th	4
2018	RLR MSport	LMP3	Ligier JS P3					RBR; 13	SPA; 12	POR; 15	28th	4
2019	RLR MSport	LMP3	Ligier JS P3	LEC	MNZ	LMS; 1	LMS; 2	CAT	SPA	ALG; 1	9th	25
2020	Mühlner Motorsport	LMP3	Duqueine M30 - D08	RIC	SPA	LEC	LMS; 1	LMS; 2	MNZ; Ret	POR; 2	13th	18
2021	RLR MSport	LMP3	Ligier JS P320	BAR	LEC	MNZ	LMS; 1; 8	LMS; 2; 6	SPA	POR	NC†	0†
2022	RLR MSport	LMP3	Ligier JS P320	LEC	IMO	LMS; 1; 16	LMS; 2; 21	MNZ	SPA	ALG	NC†	0†

^{†} As Kapadia was a guest driver, he was ineligible to score points.
