= 2018 Road to Le Mans =

Endurance sportscar racing event

The track layout of the Circuit de la Sarthe

The 3rd Road to Le Mans was an automobile endurance event composed of two 55-minute races contested by 50 teams of two drivers each racing Le Mans Prototype 3 (LMP3) and Group GT3 (GT3) cars. It was held on 14 and 16 June 2018 at the Circuit de la Sarthe, near Le Mans, France, as a support event for the 2018 24 Hours of Le Mans and the third round of six in the 2018 Le Mans Cup. The Automobile Club de l'Ouest (ACO) organised the third Road to Le Mans race along with the Le Mans Cup promoter Le Mans Endurance Management.

A Ligier JS P3-Nissan car shared by Mikkel Jensen and Kay van Berlo of EuroInternational won the first race after starting from pole position and leading every lap. The United Autosports duo of John Falb and Sean Rayhall finished in second and DKR Engineering's Leonard Hoogenboom and Jens Petersen took third. The GT3 category was won by the AF Corse pair of Marco Cioci and Piergiuseppe Perazzini sharing a Ferrari 488 GT3 from the Kessel Racing duo of Sergio Pianezzola and Giacomo Piccini. The second race was won by the Lanan Racing team of Michael Benham and Duncan Tappy sharing a Norma M30-Nissan after overtaking Rayhall in the final three laps. Falb and Rayhall duplicated their first race result by finishing in second and the DB Autosport duo of Nicolas Schatz and Jacques Wolff completed the overall podium in third. Maurizio Mediani and Christoph Ulrich of Spirit of Race won the GT3 class in a Ferrari from Kessel Racing's Andrea Piccini and Claudio Schiavoni.

== Background ==
The Automobile Club de l'Ouest (ACO) organised the 2018 Road to Le Mans for Le Mans Prototype 3 (LMP3) and Group GT3 (GT3) cars along with the Michelin Le Mans Cup promoter Le Mans Endurance Management. It took place at the Circuit de la Sarthe, near Le Mans, France on 14 and 16 June 2018. This was the third running of the race, the third round of six in the 2018 Le Mans Cup and served as a support event for the 2018 24 Hours of Le Mans.

Leonard Hoogenboom and Jens Petersen led the LMP3 Drivers' Championship with 50 championship points after winning the first two races of the season at Paul Ricard and Monza. The duo were 17 championship points ahead of the second-placed James Littlejohn and Anthony Wells and 27 in front of the third-placed John Farano and Job van Uitert. Sergio Pianezzola and Giacomo Piccini led the GT3 Drivers' Championship with 51 championship points following victories at Paul Ricard and Monza, 21 ahead of Maurizio Mediani and Christoph Ulrich in second. The No. 3 DKR Engineering team led the LMP3 Teams' Championship with 51 championship points, leading the No. 2 Ecurie Ecosse/Nielsen squad by 17 championship points. With 51 championship points, the No. 8 Kessel Racing team led the GT3 Teams' Championship by 21 championship points over the No. 51 Spirit of Race squad.

== Circuit changes ==
After the 2017 Road to Le Mans, modifications were made to the Porsche Curves section of the Circuit de la Sarthe to increase safety. A large run-off area at the exit of the corner was constructed. The ACO also built a new starting line gantry 145 m (476 ft) further up the main straight to increase the capacity for cars at the beginning of the races. The changes shortened the lap distance by 3 m (9.8 ft).

== Regulations and entrants ==
A selection committee invited all current Le Mans Cup entrants and selected one-off entries to the race. Teams competing in Le Mans-based endurance racing series such as the Asian Le Mans Series (AsLMS), the Asian Le Mans Sprint Cup, the European Le Mans Series (ELMS) and the IMSA SportsCar Championship got priority in receiving invitations. Each car was piloted by two drivers and each team had to sign a Bronze-rated driver and either a second Bronze-rated or a Silver or Gold-rated racer. A driver was permitted no more than at least 20 minutes to drive on the track and the race regulations dictated a change of driver during the mandatory pit stops. According to the race's regulations, all teams had to make a mandatory pit stop lasting no less than two minutes between the 22nd and 32nd minutes of both races. All competitors (regardless of whether they were full-time Le Mans Cup status) in both classes were eligible to score championship points provided they finished anywhere from first and below. The two pole position winners for each of the two races in each class received one championship point.

The entry list was published by the ACO on 26 April 2018. The 50-car entry list included 42 LMP3 and 8 GT3 cars, the maximum capacity for the race. In addition to the 30 guaranteed Le Mans Cup entries, there were 11 ELMS entries, two from the AsLMS while the rest of the field was filled with one-off entries only competing at Le Mans. There were 100 drivers entered by 27 racing teams from 26 different nations. There were three manufacturers represented in the LMP3 and they were Ginetta, Ligier and Norma. Many of the LMP3 entries came from the Le Mans Cup and most fielded Ligier JS P3-Nissans. The 12 non-Ligier cars were 11 Norma M30 vehicles and a single Ginetta-Juno P3-15. There were two manufacturers (Ferrari and Porsche) who were represented in the GT3 category. A total of six Ferrari 488 GT3 and one Ferrari 458 Italia GT3 and Porsche 911 GT3 R each were the three cars entered in the class.

== Practice ==
Two one-hour practice sessions were held on the evening of 13 June and the morning of 14 June. Duncan Tappy set the fastest overall lap time in the No. 25 Lanan Racing Norma car with a time of 3:54.062. He was 0.433 seconds ahead of Sean Rayhall's No. 33 United Autosports Ligier entry, the highest-placed Ligier vehicle. The No. 9 Cool Racing Norma car of Scott Andrews was third. All three drivers lapped within half a second of each other. The GT3 category was led by the No. 71 AF Corse Ferrari of Marco Cioci with a lap of 4:00.215 he set in the final ten minutes. Cioci was almost a second faster than the second-placed No. 51 Spirit of Race Ferrari driven by Mediani.

The second practice session took place in dry but cloudy weather conditions. Laurents Hörr was the fastest driver overall with a lap time of 3:50.599 he set in the No. 30 CD Sport Norma car. The No. 11 EuroInternational Ligier entry of Mikkel Jensen was second-fastest, 0.924 seconds slower than Hörr. Jensen demoted Andrews's No. 9 Cool entry to third overall. The quickest GT3 car was the No. 71 AF Corse Ferrari of Piergiuseppe Perazzini with a lap time of 3:58.166. Perazzini was 0.130 seconds quicker than the second-placed No. 54 Spirit Ferrari of Frédéric Vervisch. Practice was stopped seven minutes early to allow marshals to recover a car stopped on the circuit.

== Qualifying ==
There were two 20-minute qualifying sessions held on the afternoon of 14 June to set the starting order for both races. The first session saw any one driver be allowed by their teams to participate to determine the starting grid for the first race and each team's Bronze-rated driver partook in the second session to set the starting order for the second race. Jensen ran cleanly and lapped fastest overall in a time of 3:51.315 in the No. 11 EuroInternational Ligier car to secure pole position for the first race in the LMP3 category. Andrews qualified the No. 9 Cool car in second, 0.110 seconds slower. Littlejohn put the No. 2 Ecurie Ecosse/Nielsen Ligier entry in third, followed by Matt Bell's No. 22 United Autosports entry in fourth. The No. 1 DKR Norma vehicle of James Winslow completed the top five. Qualifying was stopped with 8 minutes and 20 seconds remaining because Niclas Jönsson's wheel detached from the No. 15 M.Racing - YMR Ligier car. Cioci's No. 71 AF Corse Ferrari took the GT3 pole position with a lap time of 3:55.867, more than a second faster than Vervisch's No. 54 Spirit Ferrari. The session was ended early with a minute and four seconds to go when Ivor Dunbar's No. 75 Ecurie Ecosse/Nielsen car went off the circuit and into the Porsche Curves gravel trap.

Slow zones stopped drivers from setting competitive lap times for most of the second qualifying session. The No. 39 Graff Norma entry of Eric Trouillet set the fastest lap time to claim pole position in the LMP3 class with a lap time of 3:54.192. Anthony Pons was second in the No. 30 CD Norma car to secure a front row lockout for Norma vehicles, 0.696 seconds behind. The third-place qualifier was the No. 11 EuroInternational Ligier entry of Kay van Berlo. He was followed by the No. 3 DKR car driven by Petersen in fourth position. The No. 75 Ecurie Ecosse/Nielsen car lost its front-right wheel but managed to return to the pit lane. The No. 44 SPV Racing Ligier entry ran off the track at Dunlop corner and went into the gravel trap, ending the session prematurely. In GT3, the No. 8 Kessel Ferrari of Pianezzola set a lap time of 4:01.382 to achieve pole position in the category, more than a second faster than any other driver. Perazzini's No. 71 AF Corse Ferrari was second in class.

=== Qualifying results ===
Teams who set the pole position lap time in each class in the two qualifying sessions are denoted in bold and by a †.

==== First qualifying session ====
Final classification of the first qualifying session
Pos.	Class	No.	Team	Qualifying	Grid
1	**LMP3**	**11**	**(United States) EuroInternational**	**3:51.315**	1†
2	LMP3	9	(Switzerland) Cool Racing	3:51.425	2
3	LMP3	2	(United Kingdom) Ecurie Ecosse/Nielsen	3:52.079	3
4	LMP3	22	(United States) United Autosports	3:52.451	4
5	LMP3	1	(Luxembourg) DKR Engineering	3:52.551	5
6	LMP3	33	(United States) United Autosports	3:52.651	6
7	LMP3	32	(United States) United Autosports	3:53.153	7
8	LMP3	19	(France) Ultimate	3:53.401	8
9	LMP3	17	(Italy) RGP Motorsport	3:53.808	9
10	LMP3	79	(United Kingdom) Ecurie Ecosse/Nielsen	3:53.814	10
11	LMP3	98	(Belgium) Motorsport 98	3:54.034	11
12	LMP3	65	(France) Graff	3:54.313	12
13	LMP3	14	(United Kingdom) RLR Msport	3:54.381	13
14	LMP3	16	(France) M.Racing - YMR	3:54.547	14
15	LMP3	99	(France) N'Race	3:54.607	15
16	LMP3	76	(United Kingdom) Ecurie Ecosse/Nielsen	3:54.759	16
17	LMP3	3	(Luxembourg) DKR Engineering	3:54.836	17
18	LMP3	5	(Spain) NEFIS By Speed Factory	3:54.871	18
19	LMP3	72	(France) TFT - SO24	3:54.891	19
20	LMP3	74	(United Kingdom) Ecurie Ecosse/Nielsen	3:54.930	20
21	LMP3	25	(United Kingdom) Lanan Racing	3:55.205	21
22	LMP3	59	(United Kingdom) RLR MSport	3:55.572	22
23	**GT3**	**71**	**(Italy) AF Corse**	**3:55.867**	23†
24	LMP3	24	(Switzerland) Cool Racing	3:55.889	24
25	GT3	54	(Switzerland) Spirit of Race	3:56.955	25
26	LMP3	45	(Spain) SPV Racing	3:57.019	26
27	LMP3	90	(Austria) AT Racing	3:58.666	27
28	LMP3	60	(France) CD Sport	3:59.026	28
29	GT3	51	(Switzerland) Spirit of Race	4:00.162	29
30	LMP3	44	(Spain) SPV Racing	4:02.493	30
31	LMP3	23	(United States) United Autosports	4:03.762	31
32	LMP3	96	(Japan) TKS	4:05.579	32
33	LMP3	30	(France) CD Sport	4:05.633	33
34	LMP3	21	(France) DB Autosport	4:06.169	34
35	GT3	88	(Italy) Ebimotors	4:12.174	35
36	GT3	69	(San Marino) StileF Squadra Corse	4:17.491	36
37	LMP3	27	(Switzerland) Cool Racing	4:20.718	37
38	GT3	50	(Switzerland) Kessel Racing	4:24.131	38
39	LMP3	4	(United Kingdom) Brookspeed International	No time	39
40	GT3	8	(Switzerland) Kessel Racing	No time	40
41	LMP3	12	(United States) EuroInternational	No time	41
42	LMP3	15	(France) M.Racing - YMR	No time	42
43	LMP3	20	(France) DB Autosport	No time	43
44	LMP3	39	(France) Graff	No time	44
45	LMP3	40	(France) Graff	No time	45
46	LMP3	49	(Hong Kong) Win Motorsport	No time	46
47	LMP3	55	(Switzerland) Spirit of Race	No time	47
48	LMP3	73	(France) TFT - SO24	No time	48
49	LMP3	75	(United Kingdom) Ecurie Ecosse/Nielsen	No time	49
50	GT3	77	(Switzerland) Kessel Racing	No time	50

==== Second qualifying session ====
Final classification of the second qualifying session
Pos.	Class	No.	Team	Qualifying	Grid
1	**LMP3**	**39**	**(France) Graff**	**3:54.192**	1†
2	LMP3	30	(France) CD Sport	3:54.888	2
3	LMP3	11	(United States) EuroInternational	3:55.455	3
4	LMP3	3	(Luxembourg) DKR Engineering	3:55.969	4
5	LMP3	33	(United States) United Autosports	3:56.389	5
6	LMP3	25	(United Kingdom) Lanan Racing	3:56.435	6
7	LMP3	40	(France) Graff	3:56.985	7
8	LMP3	79	(United Kingdom) Ecurie Ecosse/Nielsen	3:57.785	8
9	LMP3	44	(Spain) SPV Racing	3:57.793	9
10	LMP3	72	(France) TFT - SO24	3:58.077	10
11	LMP3	16	(France) M.Racing - YMR	3:58.242	11
12	LMP3	19	(France) Ultimate	3:58.259	12
13	LMP3	5	(Spain) NEFIS By Speed Factory	3:58.350	13
14	LMP3	20	(France) DB Autosport	3:59.372	14
15	LMP3	14	(United Kingdom) RLR Msport	3:59.908	15
16	LMP3	2	(United Kingdom) Ecurie Ecosse/Nielsen	3:59.956	16
17	LMP3	27	(Switzerland) Cool Racing	3:59.986	17
18	LMP3	65	(France) Graff	4:00.026	18
19	LMP3	21	(France) DB Autosport	4:00.935	19
20	LMP3	60	(France) CD Sport	4:00.946	20
21	LMP3	96	(Japan) TKS	4:01.005	21
22	**GT3**	**8**	**(Switzerland) Kessel Racing**	**4:01.382**	22†
23	LMP3	32	(United States) United Autosports	4:01.649	23
24	LMP3	74	(United Kingdom) Ecurie Ecosse/Nielsen	4:01.777	24
25	LMP3	23	(United States) United Autosports	4:01.967	25
26	GT3	71	(Italy) AF Corse	4:02.748	26
27	GT3	88	(Italy) Ebimotors	4:02.928	27
28	LMP3	24	(Switzerland) Cool Racing	4:03.184	28
29	LMP3	98	(Belgium) Motorsport 98	4:03.362	29
30	LMP3	45	(Spain) SPV Racing	4:03.584	30
31	LMP3	9	(Switzerland) Cool Racing	4:04.055	31
32	LMP3	73	(France) TFT - SO24	4:07.361	32
33	LMP3	1	(Luxembourg) DKR Engineering	4:07.834	33
34	LMP3	17	(Italy) RGP Motorsport	4:07.952	34
35	GT3	69	(San Marino) StileF Squadra Corse	4:07.952	35
36	LMP3	22	(United States) United Autosports	4:07.989	36
37	LMP3	12	(United States) EuroInternational	4:08.155	37
38	LMP3	90	(Austria) AT Racing	4:09.329	50
39	LMP3	59	(United Kingdom) RLR MSport	4:10.846	38
40	GT3	51	(Switzerland) Spirit of Race	4:12.122	39
41	GT3	77	(Switzerland) Kessel Racing	4:12.754	40
42	GT3	54	(Switzerland) Spirit of Race	4:13.932	41
43	GT3	50	(Switzerland) Kessel Racing	4:17.630	42
44	LMP3	4	(United Kingdom) Brookspeed International	4:21.188	43
45	LMP3	49	(Hong Kong) Win Motorsport	4:37.374	44
46	LMP3	15	(France) M.Racing - YMR	No time	45
47	LMP3	55	(Switzerland) Spirit of Race	No time	49
48	LMP3	75	(United Kingdom) Ecurie Ecosse/Nielsen	No time	46
49	LMP3	76	(United Kingdom) Ecurie Ecosse/Nielsen	No time	47
50	LMP3	99	(France) N'Race	No time	48

== Races ==
=== Race one ===
The first 55-minute race commenced at 17:30 local time on 14 June. It was held in dry but cloudy weather conditions ranging from 18.65 to 19.5 °C (65.57 to 67.10 °F) and a track temperature between 20 and 21.5 °C (68.0 and 70.7 °F). 49 cars were due to take the start, but Bell's No. 22 United Autosports Ligier entry stopped on the formation lap but rejoined the race four laps down. When the lights went out to begin the race, Jensen maintained the No. 11 EuroInternational entry's pole position advantage from Andrews's No. 9 Cool Norma car. Littlejohn spun at the first Mulsanne chicane and picked up a right-rear puncture because of a collision with Burdon's No. 59 RLR MSport Ligier vehicle. Littlejohn returned to the pit lane and fell one lap behind. Furtherback, Perazzini maintained the GT3 class lead from Louis Soenen's No. 54 Spirit Ferrari, who overtook Ulrich's No 51 Spirit Ferrari on the first lap. Pianezzola began closing up to the category leaders and moved the No. 8 Kessel Ferrari to second in class by lap three before gaining on the class-leading Perrazini. At the front, Jensen and Andrews were battling for the overall lead, as Pianezzola took the GT3 class lead from Perazzini on lap five.

Following the series of compulsory pit stops, the No. 11 EuroInternational car of Van Berlo maintained the overall lead, with his advantage extended to be 21 seconds ahead of Dan Polley's No. 1 DKR entry that had moved into second. Rayhall's No. 33 United Autosports car moved into third place by overtaking three cars on lap eight and he then passed Polley for second two laps later. Piccini relieved from Pianezzola in the GT3-class leading No. 8 Kessel Ferrari and held the lead until the car was imposed a 30-second stop-and-go-penalty for speeding during a Slow Zone procedure prior to the pit stop phase. This promoted Cioci's No. 71 AF Corse Ferrari to the GT3 lead as the penalty dropped Piccini to second. At the front, Van Berlo maintained the lead the No. 11 EuroInternational car had held since the first lap to secure the overall win. The No. 33 United Autosports car of John Falb and Rayhall finished 19.505 seconds behind in second after Rayhall was lapping faster than Van Berlo but was unable to close up sufficiently to Van Berlo. The No. 3 DKR duo of Hoogenboom and Petersen completed the podium in third. The No. 71 AF Corse team won the GT3 class by 46.7 seconds over the No. 8 Kessel Ferrari, which was 0.7 seconds ahead of the sister No. 77 Kessel Ferrari in third.

==== Race one classification ====
Winners in each class are denoted in bold and ‡

Final classification of the first race
Pos	Class	No.	Team	Drivers	Chassis	Tyre	Laps	Time/Reason
Pos	Class	No.	Team	Drivers	Engine	Tyre	Laps	Time/Reason
1	**LMP3**	**11**	**(United States) EuroInternational**	**(Denmark) Mikkel Jensen** **(Netherlands) Kay van Berlo**	**Ligier JS P3**	M	**13**	**55:05.879‡**
1	**LMP3**	**11**	**(United States) EuroInternational**	**(Denmark) Mikkel Jensen** **(Netherlands) Kay van Berlo**	**Nissan VK50VE 5.0 L V8**	M	**13**	**55:05.879‡**
2	LMP3	33	(United States) United Autosports	(United States) John Falb (United States) Sean Rayhall	Ligier JS P3	M	13	+19.505
2	LMP3	33	(United States) United Autosports	(United States) John Falb (United States) Sean Rayhall	Nissan VK50VE 5.0 L V8	M	13	+19.505
3	LMP3	3	(Luxembourg) DKR Engineering	(Netherlands) Leonard Hoogenboom (Germany) Jens Petersen	Norma M30	M	13	+40.148
3	LMP3	3	(Luxembourg) DKR Engineering	(Netherlands) Leonard Hoogenboom (Germany) Jens Petersen	Nissan VK50VE 5.0 L V8	M	13	+40.148
4	LMP3	16	(France) M.Racing - YMR	(France) Natan Bihel (France) Laurent Millara	Norma M30	M	13	+49.447
4	LMP3	16	(France) M.Racing - YMR	(France) Natan Bihel (France) Laurent Millara	Nissan VK50VE 5.0 L V8	M	13	+49.447
5	LMP3	79	(United Kingdom) Ecurie Ecosse/Nielsen	(United Kingdom) Colin Noble (United Kingdom) Alasdair McCaig	Ligier JS P3	M	13	+49.614
5	LMP3	79	(United Kingdom) Ecurie Ecosse/Nielsen	(United Kingdom) Colin Noble (United Kingdom) Alasdair McCaig	Nissan VK50VE 5.0 L V8	M	13	+49.614
6	LMP3	25	(United Kingdom) Lanan Racing	(United Kingdom) Michael Benham (United Kingdom) Duncan Tappy	Norma M30	M	13	+49.951
6	LMP3	25	(United Kingdom) Lanan Racing	(United Kingdom) Michael Benham (United Kingdom) Duncan Tappy	Nissan VK50VE 5.0 L V8	M	13	+49.951
7	LMP3	40	(France) Graff	(France) Adrien Chila (France) Marc-Antoine Dannielou	Norma M30	M	13	+1:02.063
7	LMP3	40	(France) Graff	(France) Adrien Chila (France) Marc-Antoine Dannielou	Nissan VK50VE 5.0 L V8	M	13	+1:02.063
8	LMP3	76	(United Kingdom) Ecurie Ecosse/Nielsen	(United Kingdom) Alex Kapadia (Denmark) Christian Olsen	Ligier JS P3	M	13	+1:02.297
8	LMP3	76	(United Kingdom) Ecurie Ecosse/Nielsen	(United Kingdom) Alex Kapadia (Denmark) Christian Olsen	Nissan VK50VE 5.0 L V8	M	13	+1:02.297
9	LMP3	65	(France) Graff	(France) Damien Delafosse (Brazil) Sergio Pasian	Norma M30	M	13	+1:03.351
9	LMP3	65	(France) Graff	(France) Damien Delafosse (Brazil) Sergio Pasian	Nissan VK50VE 5.0 L V8	M	13	+1:03.351
10	LMP3	21	(France) DB Autosport	(France) Nicolas Schatz (France) Jacques Wolff	Norma M30	M	13	+1:04.158
10	LMP3	21	(France) DB Autosport	(France) Nicolas Schatz (France) Jacques Wolff	Nissan VK50VE 5.0 L V8	M	13	+1:04.158
11	LMP3	5	(Spain) NEFIS By Speed Factory	(Russia) Timur Boguslavskiy (Switzerland) Marcello Marateotto	Ligier JS P3	M	13	+1:09.341
11	LMP3	5	(Spain) NEFIS By Speed Factory	(Russia) Timur Boguslavskiy (Switzerland) Marcello Marateotto	Nissan VK50VE 5.0 L V8	M	13	+1:09.341
12	LMP3	39	(France) Graff	(France) Adrien Trouillet (France) Eric Trouillet	Norma M30	M	13	+1:11.229
12	LMP3	39	(France) Graff	(France) Adrien Trouillet (France) Eric Trouillet	Nissan VK50VE 5.0 L V8	M	13	+1:11.229
13	LMP3	32	(United States) United Autosports	(United States) Najaf Husain (United States) Colin Braun	Ligier JS P3	M	13	+1:14.977
13	LMP3	32	(United States) United Autosports	(United States) Najaf Husain (United States) Colin Braun	Nissan VK50VE 5.0 L V8	M	13	+1:14.977
14	LMP3	9	(Switzerland) Cool Racing	(Australia) Scott Andrews (United States) Gerald Kraut	Norma M30	M	13	+1:18.000
14	LMP3	9	(Switzerland) Cool Racing	(Australia) Scott Andrews (United States) Gerald Kraut	Nissan VK50VE 5.0 L V8	M	13	+1:18.000
15	LMP3	98	(Belgium) Motorsport 98	(Belgium) Eric De Doncker (France) Dino Lunardi	Ligier JS P3	M	13	+1:19.855
15	LMP3	98	(Belgium) Motorsport 98	(Belgium) Eric De Doncker (France) Dino Lunardi	Nissan VK50VE 5.0 L V8	M	13	+1:19.855
16	LMP3	24	(Switzerland) Cool Racing	(Switzerland) Antonin Borga (Switzerland) Alexandre Coigny	Ligier JS P3	M	13	+1:23.088
16	LMP3	24	(Switzerland) Cool Racing	(Switzerland) Antonin Borga (Switzerland) Alexandre Coigny	Nissan VK50VE 5.0 L V8	M	13	+1:23.088
17	LMP3	27	(Switzerland) Cool Racing	(France) Marvin Klein (Switzerland) Christian Vaglio	Ligier JS P3	M	13	+1:27.513
17	LMP3	27	(Switzerland) Cool Racing	(France) Marvin Klein (Switzerland) Christian Vaglio	Nissan VK50VE 5.0 L V8	M	13	+1:27.513
18	LMP3	45	(Spain) SPV Racing	(United Kingdom) Andy Cummings (United Kingdom) Bradley Ellis	Ligier JS P3	M	13	+1:29.248
18	LMP3	45	(Spain) SPV Racing	(United Kingdom) Andy Cummings (United Kingdom) Bradley Ellis	Nissan VK50VE 5.0 L V8	M	13	+1:29.248
19	LMP3	30	(Spain) CD Sport	(Germany) Laurents Hörr (France) Anthony Pons	Norma M30	M	13	+1:50.701
19	LMP3	30	(Spain) CD Sport	(Germany) Laurents Hörr (France) Anthony Pons	Nissan VK50VE 5.0 L V8	M	13	+1:50.701
20	**GT3**	**71**	**(Italy) AF Corse**	**(Italy) Marco Cioci** **(Italy) Piergiuseppe Perazzini**	**Ferrari 488 GT3**	M	**13**	**+2:01.585‡**
20	**GT3**	**71**	**(Italy) AF Corse**	**(Italy) Marco Cioci** **(Italy) Piergiuseppe Perazzini**	**Ferrari F154CB 3.9 L Turbo V8**	M	**13**	**+2:01.585‡**
21	LMP3	72	(France) TFT - SO24	(France) Arnold Robin (France) Maxime Robin	Norma M30	M	13	+2:29.773
21	LMP3	72	(France) TFT - SO24	(France) Arnold Robin (France) Maxime Robin	Nissan VK50VE 5.0 L V8	M	13	+2:29.773
22	LMP3	23	(United States) United Autosports	(United Kingdom) Richard Meins (United Kingdom) Shaun Lynn	Ligier JS P3	M	13	+2:47.905
22	LMP3	23	(United States) United Autosports	(United Kingdom) Richard Meins (United Kingdom) Shaun Lynn	Nissan VK50VE 5.0 L V8	M	13	+2:47.905
23	GT3	8	(Switzerland) Kessel Racing	(Italy) Sergio Pianezzola (Italy) Giacomo Piccini	Ferrari 488 GT3	M	13	+2:48.353
23	GT3	8	(Switzerland) Kessel Racing	(Italy) Sergio Pianezzola (Italy) Giacomo Piccini	Ferrari F154CB 3.9 L Turbo V8	M	13	+2:48.353
24	GT3	77	(Switzerland) Kessel Racing	(Italy) Andrea Piccini (Italy) Claudio Schiavoni	Ferrari 488 GT3	M	13	+2:49.059
24	GT3	77	(Switzerland) Kessel Racing	(Italy) Andrea Piccini (Italy) Claudio Schiavoni	Ferrari F154CB 3.9 L Turbo V8	M	13	+2:49.059
25	GT3	54	(Switzerland) Spirit of Race	(Belgium) Louis Soenen (Belgium) Frédéric Vervisch	Ferrari 488 GT3	M	13	+2:49.229
25	GT3	54	(Switzerland) Spirit of Race	(Belgium) Louis Soenen (Belgium) Frédéric Vervisch	Ferrari F154CB 3.9 L Turbo V8	M	13	+2:49.229
26	LMP3	96	(Japan) TKS	(Japan) Shinyo Sano (Japan) Takuya Shirasaka	Ginetta-Juno LMP3	M	13	+2:52.395
26	LMP3	96	(Japan) TKS	(Japan) Shinyo Sano (Japan) Takuya Shirasaka	Nissan VK50VE 5.0 L V8	M	13	+2:52.395
27	LMP3	51	(Switzerland) Spirit of Race	(Italy) Maurizio Mediani (Switzerland) Christoph Ulrich	Ligier JS P3	M	13	+2:52.612
27	LMP3	51	(Switzerland) Spirit of Race	(Italy) Maurizio Mediani (Switzerland) Christoph Ulrich	Nissan VK50VE 5.0 L V8	M	13	+2:52.612
28	GT3	50	(Switzerland) Kessel Racing	(United Kingdom) Oliver Hancock (United Kingdom) John Hartshorne	Ferrari 488 GT3	M	13	+2:53.800
28	GT3	50	(Switzerland) Kessel Racing	(United Kingdom) Oliver Hancock (United Kingdom) John Hartshorne	Ferrari F154CB 3.9 L Turbo V8	M	13	+2:53.800
29	LMP3	20	(France) DB Autosport	(France) Jean-Ludovic Foubert (Switzerland) Nicolas Maulini	Norma M30	M	13	+2:54.120
29	LMP3	20	(France) DB Autosport	(France) Jean-Ludovic Foubert (Switzerland) Nicolas Maulini	Nissan VK50VE 5.0 L V8	M	13	+2:54.120
30	LMP3	12	(United States) EuroInternational	(Canada) James Dayson (United States) Mark Kvamme	Ligier JS P3	M	13	+3:15.569
30	LMP3	12	(United States) EuroInternational	(Canada) James Dayson (United States) Mark Kvamme	Nissan VK50VE 5.0 L V8	M	13	+3:15.569
31	LMP3	44	(Spain) SPV Racing	(Mexico) Ricardo Sanchez (Spain) Álvaro Fonte	Ligier JS P3	M	13	+3:15.834
31	LMP3	44	(Spain) SPV Racing	(Mexico) Ricardo Sanchez (Spain) Álvaro Fonte	Nissan VK50VE 5.0 L V8	M	13	+3:15.834
32	LMP3	4	(United Kingdom) Brookspeed International	(France) Nicolas Rondet (United States) John Schauerman	Ligier JS P3	M	13	+3:26.662
32	LMP3	4	(United Kingdom) Brookspeed International	(France) Nicolas Rondet (United States) John Schauerman	Nissan VK50VE 5.0 L V8	M	13	+3:26.662
33	LMP3	74	(United Kingdom) Ecurie Ecosse/Nielsen	(United Kingdom) Patrick McClughan (United States) Gerhard Watzinger	Ligier JS P3	M	13	+3:29.116
33	LMP3	74	(United Kingdom) Ecurie Ecosse/Nielsen	(United Kingdom) Patrick McClughan (United States) Gerhard Watzinger	Nissan VK50VE 5.0 L V8	M	13	+3:29.116
34	GT3	88	(Italy) Ebimotors	(Italy) Alessandro Baccani (Italy) Paolo Venerosi	Porsche 911 GT3 R	M	13	+3:29.563
34	GT3	88	(Italy) Ebimotors	(Italy) Alessandro Baccani (Italy) Paolo Venerosi	Porsche 4.0 L Flat-6	M	13	+3:29.563
35	GT3	69	(San Marino) StileF Squadra Corse	(Switzerland) Martin Grab (Switzerland) Gino Forgione	Ferrari 458 Italia GT3	M	13	+3:29.859
35	GT3	69	(San Marino) StileF Squadra Corse	(Switzerland) Martin Grab (Switzerland) Gino Forgione	Ferrari F136 4.5 L V8	M	13	+3:29.859
36	LMP3	73	(France) TFT - SO24	(France) Xavier Michel (France) Antoine Weil	Norma M30	M	13	+3:40.517
36	LMP3	73	(France) TFT - SO24	(France) Xavier Michel (France) Antoine Weil	Nissan VK50VE 5.0 L V8	M	13	+3:40.517
37	LMP3	90	(Austria) AT Racing	(Belarus) Alexander Talkanitsa Jr. (Belarus) Alexander Talkanitsa Sr.	Ligier JS P3	M	13	+3:47.082
37	LMP3	90	(Austria) AT Racing	(Belarus) Alexander Talkanitsa Jr. (Belarus) Alexander Talkanitsa Sr.	Nissan VK50VE 5.0 L V8	M	13	+3:47.082
38	LMP3	99	(France) N'Race	(France) Thomas Accary (Monaco) Alain Costa	Ligier JS P3	M	12	+1 Lap
38	LMP3	99	(France) N'Race	(France) Thomas Accary (Monaco) Alain Costa	Nissan VK50VE 5.0 L V8	M	12	+1 Lap
39	LMP3	49	(Hong Kong) Win Motorsport	(Hong Kong) William Lok (United States) Jim Michaelian	Ligier JS P3	M	12	+1 Lap
39	LMP3	49	(Hong Kong) Win Motorsport	(Hong Kong) William Lok (United States) Jim Michaelian	Nissan VK50VE 5.0 L V8	M	12	+1 Lap
40	LMP3	1	(Luxembourg) DKR Engineering	(Republic of Ireland) Dan Polley (United Kingdom) James Winslow	Norma M30	M	11	+2 Laps
40	LMP3	1	(Luxembourg) DKR Engineering	(Republic of Ireland) Dan Polley (United Kingdom) James Winslow	Nissan VK50VE 5.0 L V8	M	11	+2 Laps
41	LMP3	15	(France) M.Racing - YMR	(United States) Jon Bennett (Sweden) Niclas Jönsson	Ligier JS P3	M	11	+2 Laps
41	LMP3	15	(France) M.Racing - YMR	(United States) Jon Bennett (Sweden) Niclas Jönsson	Nissan VK50VE 5.0 L V8	M	11	+2 Laps
42	LMP3	75	(United Kingdom) Ecurie Ecosse/Nielsen	(United Kingdom) Ivor Dunbar (United Kingdom) Bonamy Grimes	Ligier JS P3	M	11	+2 Laps
42	LMP3	75	(United Kingdom) Ecurie Ecosse/Nielsen	(United Kingdom) Ivor Dunbar (United Kingdom) Bonamy Grimes	Nissan VK50VE 5.0 L V8	M	11	+2 Laps
43	LMP3	19	(France) Ultimate	(France) François Hériau (France) Jean-Baptiste Lahaye	Norma M30	M	9	+4 Laps
43	LMP3	19	(France) Ultimate	(France) François Hériau (France) Jean-Baptiste Lahaye	Nissan VK50VE 5.0 L V8	M	9	+4 Laps
44	LMP3	22	(United States) United Autosports	(United Kingdom) Matthew Bell (United States) Jim McGuire	Ligier JS P3	M	9	+4 Laps
44	LMP3	22	(United States) United Autosports	(United Kingdom) Matthew Bell (United States) Jim McGuire	Nissan VK50VE 5.0 L V8	M	9	+4 Laps
45	LMP3	17	(Italy) RGP Motorsport	(Italy) Marco Cencetti (Greece) Ioannis Inglessis	Ligier JS P3	M	8	Did not finish
45	LMP3	17	(Italy) RGP Motorsport	(Italy) Marco Cencetti (Greece) Ioannis Inglessis	Nissan VK50VE 5.0 L V8	M	8	Did not finish
46	LMP3	60	(France) CD Sport	(France) Nicolas Mélin (France) Julien Piguet	Norma M30	M	5	Did not finish
46	LMP3	60	(France) CD Sport	(France) Nicolas Mélin (France) Julien Piguet	Nissan VK50VE 5.0 L V8	M	5	Did not finish
47	LMP3	59	(United Kingdom) RLR MSport	(Australia) Josh Burdon (China) Neric Wei	Ligier JS P3	M	3	Did not finish
47	LMP3	59	(United Kingdom) RLR MSport	(Australia) Josh Burdon (China) Neric Wei	Nissan VK50VE 5.0 L V8	M	3	Did not finish
48	LMP3	14	(United Kingdom) RLR MSport	(Canada) John Farano (Netherlands) Job Van Uitert	Ligier JS P3	M	2	Did not finish
48	LMP3	14	(United Kingdom) RLR MSport	(Canada) John Farano (Netherlands) Job Van Uitert	Nissan VK50VE 5.0 L V8	M	2	Did not finish
49	LMP3	2	(United Kingdom) Ecurie Ecosse/Nielsen	(United Kingdom) James Littlejohn (United Kingdom) Anthony Wells	Ligier JS P3	M	1	Did not finish
49	LMP3	2	(United Kingdom) Ecurie Ecosse/Nielsen	(United Kingdom) James Littlejohn (United Kingdom) Anthony Wells	Nissan VK50VE 5.0 L V8	M	1	Did not finish

=== Race two ===
The second 55-minute race commenced at 11:30 local time on 16 June. It was held in dry but light cloudy weather conditions ranging from 18.6 to 19.85 °C (65.48 to 67.73 °F) and a track temperature between 18.25 and 25 °C (64.85 and 77.00 °F). Trouillet maintained the lead heading into the Dunlop chicane. At turn two, Trouillet lost control of the car when the rear of the No. 39 Graff vehicle was hit from behind. The No. 11 EuroInternational car was caught up in the accident, moving Hörr's No. 30 CD Sport entry into the race lead. The GT3 pole sitter Pianezzola in the No. 8 Kessel Ferrari ran wide off the circuit onto the dirt at the braking zone for the Michelin chicane. The lack of grip experienced by Pianezzola caused him to slide sideways and crash into Cioci's No. 71 AF Corse Ferrari. Cioci in turn crashed into Graff's No. 65 Norma car. All three cars retired from the race. The safety car was deployed for 15 minutes to allow for the recovery of the damaged cars.

When racing resumed, the No. 30 CD Racing car pulled away from the No. 25 Lanar Racing Norma vehicle of Michael Benham, who had moved from sixth to second on the first lap. Benham was duelling Jean-Baptiste Lahaye's No. 19 Ultimate Norma car until Lahaye overtook Benham at Mulsanne corner for second position. Petersen's No. 3 DKR car and Colin Noble's No. 79 Ecurie Ecosse/Nielsen Ligier vehicle collided at the entry to the Michelin chicane, sending Noble into the gravel trap. A Slow Zone was enforced to allow for Noble's car to be moved behind the safety barriers. The mandatory pit stops began soon after and the race lead went to Adrien Chila's No. 40 Graff Norma entry. The CD Sport car lost time in the pit lane due to an engine problem. Rayhall had moved into second overall in United Autosport's No. 33 car and took the race lead with a passing manoeuvre on Chila heading towards the second Mulsanne chicane.

Mediani's No. 51 Spirit Ferrari took over the GT3 class lead from the sister No. 54 Ferrari through his co-driver Ulrich's stint. At the front, Tappy in the No. 25 Lanan Norma car was gaining on the race-leading Rayhall at a rate of half a second per lap. Tappy slipstreamed Rayhall after exiting the second Mulsanne chicane, and overtook him on the outside entering the right-hand Mulsanne corner for the race lead. Tappy pulled away from Rayhall while scything his way through slower cars until Rayhall closed up in the final two laps. Lanan Racing held the lead for the rest of the race to secure victory by 0.699 seconds ahead of the No. 33 United Autosports team, which repeated their second-place result from the first race. The No. 21 DB Autopsort Norma car of Nicolas Schatz and Jacques Wolff completed the overall podium in third position. The No. 51 Spirit Ferrari won the GT3 category by a minute over the No. 77 Kessel Ferrari. The sister No. 50 Kessel Ferrari rounded out the class podium in third.

==== Race two classification ====
Winners in each class are denoted in bold and ‡

Final classification of the second race
Pos	Class	No.	Team	Drivers	Chassis	Tyre	Laps	Time/Reason
Pos	Class	No.	Team	Drivers	Engine	Tyre	Laps	Time/Reason
1	**LMP3**	**25**	**(United Kingdom) Lanan Racing**	**(United Kingdom) Michael Benham** **(United Kingdom) Duncan Tappy**	**Norma M30**	M	**12**	**55:29.696‡**
1	**LMP3**	**25**	**(United Kingdom) Lanan Racing**	**(United Kingdom) Michael Benham** **(United Kingdom) Duncan Tappy**	**Nissan VK50VE 5.0 L V8**	M	**12**	**55:29.696‡**
2	LMP3	33	(United States) United Autosports	(United States) John Falb (United States) Sean Rayhall	Ligier JS P3	M	12	+0.699
2	LMP3	33	(United States) United Autosports	(United States) John Falb (United States) Sean Rayhall	Nissan VK50VE 5.0 L V8	M	12	+0.699
3	LMP3	21	(France) DB Autosport	(France) Nicolas Schatz (France) Jacques Wolff	Norma M30	M	12	+12.615
3	LMP3	21	(France) DB Autosport	(France) Nicolas Schatz (France) Jacques Wolff	Nissan VK50VE 5.0 L V8	M	12	+12.615
4	LMP3	3	(Luxembourg) DKR Engineering	(Netherlands) Leonard Hoogenboom (Germany) Jens Petersen	Norma M30	M	12	+14.580
4	LMP3	3	(Luxembourg) DKR Engineering	(Netherlands) Leonard Hoogenboom (Germany) Jens Petersen	Nissan VK50VE 5.0 L V8	M	12	+14.580
5	LMP3	40	(France) Graff	(France) Adrien Chila (France) Marc-Antoine Dannielou	Norma M30	M	12	+28.871
5	LMP3	40	(France) Graff	(France) Adrien Chila (France) Marc-Antoine Dannielou	Nissan VK50VE 5.0 L V8	M	12	+28.871
6	LMP3	11	(United States) EuroInternational	(Denmark) Mikkel Jensen (Netherlands) Kay van Berlo	Ligier JS P3	M	12	+31.556
6	LMP3	11	(United States) EuroInternational	(Denmark) Mikkel Jensen (Netherlands) Kay van Berlo	Nissan VK50VE 5.0 L V8	M	12	+31.556
7	LMP3	5	(Spain) NEFIS By Speed Factory	(Russia) Timur Boguslavskiy (Switzerland) Marcello Marateotto	Ligier JS P3	M	12	+34.791
7	LMP3	5	(Spain) NEFIS By Speed Factory	(Russia) Timur Boguslavskiy (Switzerland) Marcello Marateotto	Nissan VK50VE 5.0 L V8	M	12	+34.791
8	LMP3	20	(France) DB Autosport	(France) Jean-Ludovic Foubert (Switzerland) Nicolas Maulini	Norma M30	M	12	+36.909
8	LMP3	20	(France) DB Autosport	(France) Jean-Ludovic Foubert (Switzerland) Nicolas Maulini	Nissan VK50VE 5.0 L V8	M	12	+36.909
9	LMP3	98	(Belgium) Motorsport 98	(Belgium) Eric De Doncker (France) Dino Lunardi	Ligier JS P3	M	12	+37.856
9	LMP3	98	(Belgium) Motorsport 98	(Belgium) Eric De Doncker (France) Dino Lunardi	Nissan VK50VE 5.0 L V8	M	12	+37.856
10	LMP3	30	(Spain) CD Sport	(Germany) Laurents Hörr (France) Anthony Pons	Norma M30	M	12	+1:00.250
10	LMP3	30	(Spain) CD Sport	(Germany) Laurents Hörr (France) Anthony Pons	Nissan VK50VE 5.0 L V8	M	12	+1:00.250
11	LMP3	24	(Switzerland) Cool Racing	(Switzerland) Antonin Borga (Switzerland) Alexandre Coigny	Ligier JS P3	M	12	+1:02.473
11	LMP3	24	(Switzerland) Cool Racing	(Switzerland) Antonin Borga (Switzerland) Alexandre Coigny	Nissan VK50VE 5.0 L V8	M	12	+1:02.473
12	LMP3	76	(United Kingdom) Ecurie Ecosse/Nielsen	(United Kingdom) Alex Kapadia (Denmark) Christian Olsen	Ligier JS P3	M	12	+1:04.101
12	LMP3	76	(United Kingdom) Ecurie Ecosse/Nielsen	(United Kingdom) Alex Kapadia (Denmark) Christian Olsen	Nissan VK50VE 5.0 L V8	M	12	+1:04.101
**13**	**GT3**	**51**	**(Switzerland) Spirit of Race**	**(Italy) Maurizio Mediani** **(Switzerland) Christoph Ulrich**	**Ferrari 488 GT3**	M	**12**	**+1:12.124‡**
**13**	**GT3**	**51**	**(Switzerland) Spirit of Race**	**(Italy) Maurizio Mediani** **(Switzerland) Christoph Ulrich**	**Ferrari F154CB 3.9 L Turbo V8**	M	**12**	**+1:12.124‡**
14	LMP3	39	(France) Graff	(France) Adrien Trouillet (France) Eric Trouillet	Norma M30	M	12	+1:13.061
14	LMP3	39	(France) Graff	(France) Adrien Trouillet (France) Eric Trouillet	Nissan VK50VE 5.0 L V8	M	12	+1:13.061
15	LMP3	16	(France) M.Racing - YMR	(France) Natan Bihel (France) Laurent Millara	Norma M30	M	12	+1:21.193
15	LMP3	16	(France) M.Racing - YMR	(France) Natan Bihel (France) Laurent Millara	Nissan VK50VE 5.0 L V8	M	12	+1:21.193
16	LMP3	27	(Switzerland) Cool Racing	(France) Marvin Klein (Switzerland) Christian Vaglio	Ligier JS P3	M	12	+1:23.737
16	LMP3	27	(Switzerland) Cool Racing	(France) Marvin Klein (Switzerland) Christian Vaglio	Nissan VK50VE 5.0 L V8	M	12	+1:23.737
17	LMP3	9	(Switzerland) Cool Racing	(Australia) Scott Andrews (United States) Gerald Kraut	Norma M30	M	12	+1:27.016
17	LMP3	9	(Switzerland) Cool Racing	(Australia) Scott Andrews (United States) Gerald Kraut	Nissan VK50VE 5.0 L V8	M	12	+1:27.016
18	LMP3	74	(United Kingdom) Ecurie Ecosse/Nielsen	(United Kingdom) Patrick McClughan (United States) Gerhard Watzinger	Ligier JS P3	M	12	+1:31.265
18	LMP3	74	(United Kingdom) Ecurie Ecosse/Nielsen	(United Kingdom) Patrick McClughan (United States) Gerhard Watzinger	Nissan VK50VE 5.0 L V8	M	12	+1:31.265
19	LMP3	14	(United Kingdom) RLR MSport	(Canada) John Farano (Netherlands) Job Van Uitert	Ligier JS P3	M	12	+1:32.402
19	LMP3	14	(United Kingdom) RLR MSport	(Canada) John Farano (Netherlands) Job Van Uitert	Nissan VK50VE 5.0 L V8	M	12	+1:32.402
20	LMP3	72	(France) TFT - SO24	(France) Arnold Robin (France) Maxime Robin	Norma M30	M	12	+1:32.693
20	LMP3	72	(France) TFT - SO24	(France) Arnold Robin (France) Maxime Robin	Nissan VK50VE 5.0 L V8	M	12	+1:32.693
21	LMP3	44	(Spain) SPV Racing	(Mexico) Ricardo Sanchez (Spain) Álvaro Fonte	Ligier JS P3	M	12	+1:40.357
21	LMP3	44	(Spain) SPV Racing	(Mexico) Ricardo Sanchez (Spain) Álvaro Fonte	Nissan VK50VE 5.0 L V8	M	12	+1:40.357
22	LMP3	15	(France) M.Racing - YMR	(United States) Jon Bennett (Sweden) Niclas Jönsson	Ligier JS P3	M	12	+1:40.565
22	LMP3	15	(France) M.Racing - YMR	(United States) Jon Bennett (Sweden) Niclas Jönsson	Nissan VK50VE 5.0 L V8	M	12	+1:40.565
23	LMP3	22	(United States) United Autosports	(United Kingdom) Matthew Bell (United States) Jim McGuire	Ligier JS P3	M	12	+1:43.374
23	LMP3	22	(United States) United Autosports	(United Kingdom) Matthew Bell (United States) Jim McGuire	Nissan VK50VE 5.0 L V8	M	12	+1:43.374
24	LMP3	45	(Spain) SPV Racing	(United Kingdom) Andy Cummings (United Kingdom) Bradley Ellis	Ligier JS P3	M	12	+1:44.912
24	LMP3	45	(Spain) SPV Racing	(United Kingdom) Andy Cummings (United Kingdom) Bradley Ellis	Nissan VK50VE 5.0 L V8	M	12	+1:44.912
25	LMP3	73	(France) TFT - SO24	(France) Xavier Michel (France) Antoine Weil	Norma M30	M	12	+2:03.829
25	LMP3	73	(France) TFT - SO24	(France) Xavier Michel (France) Antoine Weil	Nissan VK50VE 5.0 L V8	M	12	+2:03.829
26	LMP3	59	(United Kingdom) RLR MSport	(Australia) Josh Burdon (China) Neric Wei	Ligier JS P3	M	12	+2:12.526
26	LMP3	59	(United Kingdom) RLR MSport	(Australia) Josh Burdon (China) Neric Wei	Nissan VK50VE 5.0 L V8	M	12	+2:12.526
27	GT3	77	(Switzerland) Kessel Racing	(Italy) Andrea Piccini (Italy) Claudio Schiavoni	Ferrari 488 GT3	M	12	+2:13.017
27	GT3	77	(Switzerland) Kessel Racing	(Italy) Andrea Piccini (Italy) Claudio Schiavoni	Ferrari F154CB 3.9 L Turbo V8	M	12	+2:13.017
28	LMP3	4	(United Kingdom) Brookspeed International	(France) Nicolas Rondet (United States) John Schauerman	Ligier JS P3	M	12	+2:14.029
28	LMP3	4	(United Kingdom) Brookspeed International	(France) Nicolas Rondet (United States) John Schauerman	Nissan VK50VE 5.0 L V8	M	12	+2:14.029
29	LMP3	1	(Luxembourg) DKR Engineering	(Republic of Ireland) Dan Polley (United Kingdom) James Winslow	Norma M30	M	12	+2:45.186
29	LMP3	1	(Luxembourg) DKR Engineering	(Republic of Ireland) Dan Polley (United Kingdom) James Winslow	Nissan VK50VE 5.0 L V8	M	12	+2:45.186
30	LMP3	75	(United Kingdom) Ecurie Ecosse/Nielsen	(United Kingdom) Ivor Dunbar (United Kingdom) Bonamy Grimes	Ligier JS P3	M	12	+2:46.954
30	LMP3	75	(United Kingdom) Ecurie Ecosse/Nielsen	(United Kingdom) Ivor Dunbar (United Kingdom) Bonamy Grimes	Nissan VK50VE 5.0 L V8	M	12	+2:46.954
31	LMP3	17	(Italy) RGP Motorsport	(Italy) Marco Cencetti (Greece) Ioannis Inglessis	Ligier JS P3	M	12	+2:49.668
31	LMP3	17	(Italy) RGP Motorsport	(Italy) Marco Cencetti (Greece) Ioannis Inglessis	Nissan VK50VE 5.0 L V8	M	12	+2:49.668
32	GT3	50	(Switzerland) Kessel Racing	(United Kingdom) Oliver Hancock (United Kingdom) John Hartshorne	Ferrari 488 GT3	M	12	+2:54.735
32	GT3	50	(Switzerland) Kessel Racing	(United Kingdom) Oliver Hancock (United Kingdom) John Hartshorne	Ferrari F154CB 3.9 L Turbo V8	M	12	+2:54.735
33	LMP3	2	(United Kingdom) Ecurie Ecosse/Nielsen	(United Kingdom) James Littlejohn (United Kingdom) Anthony Wells	Ligier JS P3	M	12	+2:58.314
33	LMP3	2	(United Kingdom) Ecurie Ecosse/Nielsen	(United Kingdom) James Littlejohn (United Kingdom) Anthony Wells	Nissan VK50VE 5.0 L V8	M	12	+2:58.314
34	GT3	54	(Switzerland) Spirit of Race	(Belgium) Louis Soenen (Belgium) Frédéric Vervisch	Ferrari 488 GT3	M	12	+2:59.961
34	GT3	54	(Switzerland) Spirit of Race	(Belgium) Louis Soenen (Belgium) Frédéric Vervisch	Ferrari F154CB 3.9 L Turbo V8	M	12	+2:59.961
35	GT3	88	(Italy) Ebimotors	(Italy) Alessandro Baccani (Italy) Paolo Venerosi	Porsche 911 GT3 R	M	12	+3:15.394
35	GT3	88	(Italy) Ebimotors	(Italy) Alessandro Baccani (Italy) Paolo Venerosi	Porsche 4.0 L Flat-6	M	12	+3:15.394
36	GT3	69	(San Marino) StileF Squadra Corse	(Switzerland) Martin Grab (Switzerland) Gino Forgione	Ferrari 458 Italia GT3	M	12	+3:37.210
36	GT3	69	(San Marino) StileF Squadra Corse	(Switzerland) Martin Grab (Switzerland) Gino Forgione	Ferrari F136 4.5 L V8	M	12	+3:37.210
37	LMP3	99	(France) N'Race	(France) Thomas Accary (Monaco) Alain Costa	Ligier JS P3	M	12	+4:25.213
37	LMP3	99	(France) N'Race	(France) Thomas Accary (Monaco) Alain Costa	Nissan VK50VE 5.0 L V8	M	12	+4:25.213
38	LMP3	12	(United States) EuroInternational	(Canada) James Dayson (United States) Mark Kvamme	Ligier JS P3	M	11	+1 Lap
38	LMP3	12	(United States) EuroInternational	(Canada) James Dayson (United States) Mark Kvamme	Nissan VK50VE 5.0 L V8	M	11	+1 Lap
39	LMP3	49	(Hong Kong) Win Motorsport	(Hong Kong) William Lok (United States) Jim Michaelian	Ligier JS P3	M	11	+1 Lap
39	LMP3	49	(Hong Kong) Win Motorsport	(Hong Kong) William Lok (United States) Jim Michaelian	Nissan VK50VE 5.0 L V8	M	11	+1 Lap
40	LMP3	23	(United States) United Autosports	(United Kingdom) Richard Meins (United Kingdom) Shaun Lynn	Ligier JS P3	M	11	+1 Lap
40	LMP3	23	(United States) United Autosports	(United Kingdom) Richard Meins (United Kingdom) Shaun Lynn	Nissan VK50VE 5.0 L V8	M	11	+1 Lap
41	LMP3	19	(France) Ultimate	(France) François Hériau (France) Jean-Baptiste Lahaye	Norma M30	M	10	+2 Laps
41	LMP3	19	(France) Ultimate	(France) François Hériau (France) Jean-Baptiste Lahaye	Nissan VK50VE 5.0 L V8	M	10	+2 Laps
42	LMP3	32	(United States) United Autosports	(United States) Najaf Husain (United States) Colin Braun	Ligier JS P3	M	10	+2 Laps
42	LMP3	32	(United States) United Autosports	(United States) Najaf Husain (United States) Colin Braun	Nissan VK50VE 5.0 L V8	M	10	+2 Laps
43	LMP3	96	(Japan) TKS	(Japan) Shinyo Sano (Japan) Takuya Shirasaka	Ginetta-Juno LMP3	M	5	Did not finish
43	LMP3	96	(Japan) TKS	(Japan) Shinyo Sano (Japan) Takuya Shirasaka	Nissan VK50VE 5.0 L V8	M	5	Did not finish
44	LMP3	60	(France) CD Sport	(France) Nicolas Mélin (France) Julien Piguet	Norma M30	M	5	Did not finish
44	LMP3	60	(France) CD Sport	(France) Nicolas Mélin (France) Julien Piguet	Nissan VK50VE 5.0 L V8	M	5	Did not finish
45	LMP3	79	(United Kingdom) Ecurie Ecosse/Nielsen	(United Kingdom) Colin Noble (United Kingdom) Alasdair McCaig	Ligier JS P3	M	4	Did not finish
45	LMP3	79	(United Kingdom) Ecurie Ecosse/Nielsen	(United Kingdom) Colin Noble (United Kingdom) Alasdair McCaig	Nissan VK50VE 5.0 L V8	M	4	Did not finish
46	GT3	71	(Italy) AF Corse	(Italy) Marco Cioci (Italy) Piergiuseppe Perazzini	Ferrari 488 GT3	M	1	Did not finish
46	GT3	71	(Italy) AF Corse	(Italy) Marco Cioci (Italy) Piergiuseppe Perazzini	Ferrari F154CB 3.9 L Turbo V8	M	1	Did not finish
47	LMP3	65	(France) Graff	(France) Damien Delafosse (Brazil) Sergio Pasian	Norma M30	M	0	Did not finish
47	LMP3	65	(France) Graff	(France) Damien Delafosse (Brazil) Sergio Pasian	Nissan VK50VE 5.0 L V8	M	0	Did not finish
48	GT3	8	(Switzerland) Kessel Racing	(Italy) Sergio Pianezzola (Italy) Giacomo Piccini	Ferrari 488 GT3	M	0	Did not finish
48	GT3	8	(Switzerland) Kessel Racing	(Italy) Sergio Pianezzola (Italy) Giacomo Piccini	Ferrari F154CB 3.9 L Turbo V8	M	0	Did not finish
49	LMP3	90	(Austria) AT Racing	(Belarus) Alexander Talkanitsa Jr. (Belarus) Alexander Talkanitsa Sr.	Ligier JS P3	M	0	Did not start
49	LMP3	90	(Austria) AT Racing	(Belarus) Alexander Talkanitsa Jr. (Belarus) Alexander Talkanitsa Sr.	Nissan VK50VE 5.0 L V8	M	0	Did not start

== Championship standings after the race ==
- Note: Only the top five positions are included for the Drivers' and Teams' Championship standings.

LMP3 Drivers' Championship standings
Pos.	+/–	Driver	Points
1		(Netherlands) Leonard Hoogenboom (Germany) Jens Petersen	63
2		(United Kingdom) James Littlejohn (United Kingdom) Anthony Wells	33.5
3	1	(United Kingdom) Alasdair McCaig (United Kingdom) Colin Noble	23.5
4	1	(Canada) John Farano (Netherlands) Job van Uitert	23.5
5		(France) Adrien Chila (France) Marc-Antoine Dannielou	22

LMP3 Teams' Championship standings
Pos.	+/–	No.	Constructor	Points
1		3	(Luxembourg) DKR Engineering	63
2		2	(United Kingdom) Ecurie Ecosse/Nielsen	33.5
3	1	79	(United Kingdom) Ecurie Ecosse/Nielsen	33.5
4	1	14	(United Kingdom) RLR MSport	23.5
5		40	(France) Graff	15

GT3 Drivers' Championship standings
Pos.	+/–	Driver	Points
1		(Italy) Sergio Pianezzola (Italy) Giacomo Piccini	61
2		(Italy) Maurizio Mediani (Switzerland) Christoph Ulrich	50
3		(Italy) Marco Cioci (Italy) Piergiuseppe Perazzini	42
4	1	(Italy) Andrea Piccini (Italy) Claudio Schiavoni	41
5	1	(Italy) Alessandro Baccani (Italy) Paolo Venerosi	34

GT3 Teams' Championship standings
Pos.	+/–	No.	Constructor	Points
1		8	(Switzerland) Kessel Racing	61
2		51	(Switzerland) Spirit of Race	50
3		71	(Italy) AF Corse	42
4	1	77	(Switzerland) Kessel Racing	41
5	1	88	(Italy) Ebimotors	34
