= 2019 Le Mans Cup =

The 2019 Le Mans Cup, known as the 2019 Michelin Le Mans Cup under sponsorship, was the fourth season of the Le Mans Cup. It began on 13 April at Circuit Paul Ricard and finished on 26 October at the Algarve International Circuit. The series was open to Le Mans Prototypes in the LMP3 class, and grand tourer sports cars in the GT3 class.

== Calendar ==
All races supported the 2019 European Le Mans Series except the Le Mans round, which was part of the 24 Hours of Le Mans weekend.

Round	Circuit	Location	Race length	Date
1	(France) Circuit Paul Ricard	Le Castellet, France	2 hours	13 April
2	(Italy) Autodromo Nazionale Monza	Monza, Italy	2 hours	11 May
3	(France) Circuit de la Sarthe	Le Mans, France	55 minutes	13 June
3	(France) Circuit de la Sarthe	Le Mans, France	55 minutes	15 June
4	(Spain) Circuit de Barcelona-Catalunya	Montmeló, Spain	2 hours	20 July
5	(Belgium) Circuit de Spa-Francorchamps	Spa, Belgium	2 hours	21 September
6	(Portugal) Algarve International Circuit	Portimão, Portugal	2 hours	26 October

== Entries ==
=== LMP3 ===
Team	Car	No.	Drivers	Rounds
(United Kingdom) Nielsen Racing	Norma M30	2	(United Kingdom) Colin Noble	All
(United Kingdom) Nielsen Racing	Norma M30	2	(United Kingdom) Anthony Wells	All
(United Kingdom) Nielsen Racing	Norma M30	17	(United Kingdom) Bonamy Grimes	3
(United Kingdom) Nielsen Racing	Norma M30	17	(United Kingdom) Ivor Dunbar	3
(United Kingdom) Nielsen Racing	Ligier JS P3	18	(United Kingdom) James Littlejohn	3
(United Kingdom) Nielsen Racing	Ligier JS P3	18	(Japan) Nobuya Yamanaka	3
(Luxembourg) DKR Engineering	Norma M30	3	(Germany) Laurents Hörr	All
(Luxembourg) DKR Engineering	Norma M30	3	(France) François Kirmann	All
(Luxembourg) DKR Engineering	Norma M30	5	(Italy) Marco Cencetti	1–5
(Luxembourg) DKR Engineering	Norma M30	5	(Switzerland) Marcello Marateotto	1–5
(Luxembourg) DKR Engineering	Norma M30	5	(Germany) Wolfgang Triller	6
(Luxembourg) DKR Engineering	Norma M30	5	(Germany) Kenneth Heyer	6
(Luxembourg) DKR Engineering	Ligier JS P3	29	(Netherlands) Bob Herber	3
(Luxembourg) DKR Engineering	Ligier JS P3	29	(Netherlands) Rob Kamphues	3
(Switzerland) Cool Racing	Ligier JS P3	4	(France) Nicolas Rondet	All
(Switzerland) Cool Racing	Ligier JS P3	4	(United States) John Schauerman	All
(Switzerland) Cool Racing	Ligier JS P3	74	(France) Victor Blugeon	All
(Switzerland) Cool Racing	Ligier JS P3	74	(United States) Maurice Smith	All
(Switzerland) Cool Racing	Ligier JS P3	96	(France) Romain Carton	1–5
(Switzerland) Cool Racing	Ligier JS P3	96	(Switzerland) Philippe Cimadomo	1, 4–5
(Switzerland) Cool Racing	Ligier JS P3	96	(Switzerland) Christian Vaglio	2
(Switzerland) Cool Racing	Ligier JS P3	96	(Switzerland) Alexandre Coigny	3
(France) Graff	Norma M30	9	(France) Adrien Trouillet	1–5
(France) Graff	Norma M30	9	(France) Eric Trouillet	1–5
(France) Graff	Norma M30	9	(Australia) John Corbett	6
(France) Graff	Norma M30	9	(United Kingdom) James Winslow	6
(France) Graff	Norma M30	39	(France) Adrien Chila	All
(France) Graff	Norma M30	39	(France) Nicolas Schatz	All
(France) Graff	Norma M30	72	(France) Natan Bihel	3
(France) Graff	Norma M30	72	(France) Cyril Denis	3
(France) Graff	Norma M30	91	(Liechtenstein) Matthias Kaiser	3
(France) Graff	Norma M30	91	(Switzerland) Sébastien Page	3
(Luxembourg) Racing Experience	Norma M30	11	(United Kingdom) Charlie Martin	1–2
(Luxembourg) Racing Experience	Norma M30	11	(Luxembourg) Gary Hauser	1, 4–5
(Luxembourg) Racing Experience	Norma M30	11	(Luxembourg) David Hauser	2–3, 6
(Luxembourg) Racing Experience	Norma M30	11	(France) Nicolas Mélin	3–6
(United States) Eurointernational	Ligier JS P3	12	(Italy) Marzio Moretti	1
(United States) Eurointernational	Ligier JS P3	12	(United Kingdom) JM Littman	1
(Poland) Inter Europol Competition	Ligier JS P3	13	(France) Philippe Bourgois	3
(Poland) Inter Europol Competition	Ligier JS P3	13	(United Kingdom) Simon Phillips	3
(United Kingdom) RLR MSport	Ligier JS P3	14	(Denmark) Christian Olsen	1–4
(United Kingdom) RLR MSport	Ligier JS P3	14	(Denmark) Tom Olsen	1–2
(United Kingdom) RLR MSport	Ligier JS P3	14	(United Kingdom) Mark Mayall	3
(United Kingdom) RLR MSport	Ligier JS P3	14	(Canada) James Dayson	4
(United Kingdom) RLR MSport	Ligier JS P3	14	(United Kingdom) Alex Kapadia	6
(United Kingdom) RLR MSport	Ligier JS P3	14	(United Kingdom) Rob Wheldon	6
(United Kingdom) RLR MSport	Ligier JS P3	15	(United Kingdom) Freddie Hunt	3
(United Kingdom) RLR MSport	Ligier JS P3	15	(Denmark) Martin Vedel Mortensen	3
(United Kingdom) BHK Motorsport	Ligier JS P3	16	(Italy) Jacopo Baratto	1–2
(United Kingdom) BHK Motorsport	Ligier JS P3	16	(Italy) Francesco Mannino	1–2
(France) M Racing	Norma M30	19	(France) Yann Ehrlacher	3
(France) M Racing	Norma M30	19	(France) Laurent Millara	3
(United Kingdom) Grainmarket Racing	Norma M30	20	(United Kingdom) Mark Crader	All
(United Kingdom) Grainmarket Racing	Norma M30	20	(United Kingdom) Alex Mortimer	All
(United Kingdom) United Autosports	Ligier JS P3	22	(United Kingdom) Matthew Bell	All
(United Kingdom) United Autosports	Ligier JS P3	22	(United States) James McGuire	All
(United Kingdom) United Autosports	Ligier JS P3	23	(Canada) Garett Grist	All
(United Kingdom) United Autosports	Ligier JS P3	23	(United States) Rob Hodes	All
(United Kingdom) United Autosports	Ligier JS P3	24	(United Kingdom) Wayne Boyd	1–4
(United Kingdom) United Autosports	Ligier JS P3	24	(United States) Najaf Husain	1, 3
(United Kingdom) United Autosports	Ligier JS P3	24	(United States) Mike Guasch	2, 4
(United Kingdom) United Autosports	Ligier JS P3	27	(France) Patrice Lafargue	3
(United Kingdom) United Autosports	Ligier JS P3	27	(France) Erik Maris	3
(United Kingdom) Lanan Racing	Norma M30	25	(United Kingdom) Michael Benham	All
(United Kingdom) Lanan Racing	Norma M30	25	(United Kingdom) Duncan Tappy	All
(Spain) CD Sport	Norma M30	30	(France) Kevin Bole-Besançon	1–5
(Spain) CD Sport	Norma M30	30	(France) Jacques Wolff	All
(Spain) CD Sport	Norma M30	30	(France) Vincent Beltoise	6
(Spain) CD Sport	Norma M30	60	(United Kingdom) Nick Adcock	3
(Spain) CD Sport	Norma M30	60	(Denmark) Michael Jensen	3
(France) H24 Racing Norman Nato	LMPH2G	42	(France) Olivier Lombard	5–6
(France) H24 Racing Norman Nato	LMPH2G	42	(France) Norman Nato	5–6
(Denmark) Keo Racing	Ligier JS P3	43	(Sweden) Joakim Frid	1–3
(Denmark) Keo Racing	Ligier JS P3	43	(Denmark) Michael Markussen	1–3
(Denmark) Keo Racing	Ligier JS P3	43	(Monaco) Alain Costa	4–6
(Denmark) Keo Racing	Ligier JS P3	43	(Denmark) Johan Jokinen	4–6
(Switzerland) Spirit of Race	Ligier JS P3	55	(Italy) Michele Rugolo	All
(Switzerland) Spirit of Race	Ligier JS P3	55	(Germany) Claudio Sdanewitsch	All
(Malaysia) Viper Niza Racing	Ligier JS P3	65	(Malaysia) Dominic Ang	3
(Malaysia) Viper Niza Racing	Ligier JS P3	65	(Malaysia) Douglas Khoo	3
(Italy) Monza Garage	Ligier JS P3	69	(France) Marc-Antoine Dannielou	3
(Italy) Monza Garage	Ligier JS P3	69	(France) Alexandre Yvon	3
(France) SRT41 - Frederic Sausset	Ligier JS P3	84	(Japan) Takuma Aoki	3
(France) SRT41 - Frederic Sausset	Ligier JS P3	84	(Belgium) Nigel Bailly	3
(France) SRT41 - Frederic Sausset	Ligier JS P3	84	(France) Snoussi Benmoussa	3
(Austria) AT Racing	Ligier JS P3	90	(Belarus) Alexander Talkanitsa Jr.	All
(Austria) AT Racing	Ligier JS P3	90	(Belarus) Alexander Talkanitsa Sr.	All
(Belgium) Motorsport98	Ligier JS P3	98	(Belgium) Eric De Doncker	4–6
(Belgium) Motorsport98	Ligier JS P3	98	(France) Dino Lunardi	4–6
Entry Lists:

=== GT3 ===
Team	Car	No.	Drivers	Rounds
(Italy) Scuderia Villorba Corse	Mercedes-AMG GT3	7	(Switzerland) Mauro Calamia	1–5
(Italy) Scuderia Villorba Corse	Mercedes-AMG GT3	7	(Italy) Roberto Pampanini	1–5
(Italy) Scuderia Villorba Corse	Lamborghini Huracán GT3	83	(France) Steeve Hiesse	1–3
(Italy) Scuderia Villorba Corse	Lamborghini Huracán GT3	83	(France) Cédric Mézard	1–3
(Switzerland) Kessel Racing	Ferrari 488 GT3	8	(Italy) Sergio Pianezzola	All
(Switzerland) Kessel Racing	Ferrari 488 GT3	8	(Italy) Giacomo Piccini	All
(Switzerland) Kessel Racing	Ferrari 488 GT3	50	(United Kingdom) Oliver Hancock	All
(Switzerland) Kessel Racing	Ferrari 488 GT3	50	(United Kingdom) John Hartshorne	All
(Switzerland) Kessel Racing	Ferrari 488 GT3	60	(Italy) Andrea Piccini	5–6
(Switzerland) Kessel Racing	Ferrari 488 GT3	60	(Italy) Claudio Schiavoni	5–6
(Switzerland) Kessel Racing	Ferrari 488 GT3	62	(United States) Anthony Lazzaro	3
(Switzerland) Kessel Racing	Ferrari 488 GT3	62	(United States) Philippe Mulacek	3
(Switzerland) Kessel Racing	Ferrari 488 GT3	82	(Germany) Pierre Kaffer	3
(Switzerland) Kessel Racing	Ferrari 488 GT3	82	(United States) Pierre Mulacek	3
(Italy) Krypton Motorsport	Mercedes-AMG GT3	35	(Italy) Stefano Pezzucchi	1–5
(Italy) Krypton Motorsport	Mercedes-AMG GT3	35	(Italy) Marco Zanuttini	1–5
(Germany) SPS Automotive Performance	Mercedes-AMG GT3	40	(United Kingdom) Tom Onslow-Cole	3
(Germany) SPS Automotive Performance	Mercedes-AMG GT3	40	(Germany) Valentin Pierburg	3
(Germany) SPS Automotive Performance	Mercedes-AMG GT3	54	(Germany) Yannick Mettler	All
(Germany) SPS Automotive Performance	Mercedes-AMG GT3	54	(Switzerland) Dexter Müller	All
(Switzerland) Spirit of Race	Ferrari 488 GT3	51	(Italy) Maurizio Mediani	All
(Switzerland) Spirit of Race	Ferrari 488 GT3	51	(Switzerland) Christoph Ulrich	All
(Switzerland) Spirit of Race	Ferrari 488 GT3	52	(Brazil) Oswaldo Negri Jr.	3
(Switzerland) Spirit of Race	Ferrari 488 GT3	52	(Puerto Rico) Francesco Piovanetti	3
(Switzerland) Spirit of Race	Ferrari 488 GT3	53	(Portugal) Rui Aguas	3
(Switzerland) Spirit of Race	Ferrari 488 GT3	53	(Greece) Kriton Lentoudis	3
(United States) Luzich Racing	Ferrari 488 GT3	71	(France) Fabien Lavergne	All
(United States) Luzich Racing	Ferrari 488 GT3	71	(Denmark) Mikkel Mac	All
(Italy) Ebimotors	Porsche 911 GT3 R	88	(Italy) Paolo Venerosi	1–3, 5–6
(Italy) Ebimotors	Porsche 911 GT3 R	88	(Italy) Alessandro Baccani	1–4, 6
(Italy) Ebimotors	Porsche 911 GT3 R	88	(Italy) Riccardo Pera	4
(Italy) Ebimotors	Porsche 911 GT3 R	88	(Italy) Daniel Mancinelli	5
(South Africa) Bentley Team Africa	Bentley Continental GT3	95	(Netherlands) Jan Lammers	3
(South Africa) Bentley Team Africa	Bentley Continental GT3	95	(South Africa) Greg Mills	3
(United Kingdom) TF Sport	Aston Martin Vantage AMR GT3	97	(United Kingdom) Tom Gamble	3
(United Kingdom) TF Sport	Aston Martin Vantage AMR GT3	97	(United Kingdom) Flick Haigh	3
(United Kingdom) Beechdean AMR	Aston Martin Vantage AMR GT3	99	(United Kingdom) Ross Gunn	All
(United Kingdom) Beechdean AMR	Aston Martin Vantage AMR GT3	99	(United Kingdom) Andrew Howard	All
Entry List:

== Race results ==
Bold indicates overall winner.

Rnd.		Circuit	LMP3 Winning Team	GT3 Winning Team
Rnd.		Circuit	LMP3 Winning Drivers	GT3 Winning Drivers
1		(France) Paul Ricard	**(United Kingdom) No. 25 Lanan Racing**	(Switzerland) No. 8 Kessel Racing
1		(France) Paul Ricard	**(United Kingdom) Michael Benham** **(United Kingdom) Duncan Tappy**	(Italy) Sergio Pianezzola (Italy) Giacomo Piccini
2		(Italy) Monza	**(United Kingdom) No. 25 Lanan Racing**	(United States) No. 71 Luzich Racing
2		(Italy) Monza	**(United Kingdom) Michael Benham** **(United Kingdom) Duncan Tappy**	(France) Fabien Lavergne (Denmark) Mikkel Mac
3	R1	(France) Le Mans (report)	**(France) No. 39 Graff**	(United States) No. 71 Luzich Racing
3	R1	(France) Le Mans (report)	**(France) Adrien Chila** **(France) Nicolas Schatz**	(France) Fabien Lavergne (Denmark) Mikkel Mac
3	R2	(France) Le Mans (report)	**(Luxembourg) No. 3 DKR Engineering**	(United States) No. 71 Luzich Racing
3	R2	(France) Le Mans (report)	**(Germany) Laurents Hörr** **(France) François Kirmann**	(France) Fabien Lavergne (Denmark) Mikkel Mac
4		(Spain) Barcelona	**(Luxembourg) No. 3 DKR Engineering**	(Switzerland) No. 8 Kessel Racing
4		(Spain) Barcelona	**(Germany) Laurents Hörr** **(France) François Kirmann**	(Italy) Sergio Pianezzola (Italy) Giacomo Piccini
5		(Belgium) Spa	**(United Kingdom) No. 25 Lanan Racing**	(Switzerland) No. 8 Kessel Racing
5		(Belgium) Spa	**(United Kingdom) Michael Benham** **(United Kingdom) Duncan Tappy**	(Italy) Sergio Pianezzola (Italy) Giacomo Piccini
6		(Portugal) Portimão	**(United Kingdom) No. 14 RLR MSport**	(Switzerland) No. 8 Kessel Racing
6		(Portugal) Portimão	**(United Kingdom) Alex Kapadia** **(United Kingdom) Rob Wheldon**	(Italy) Sergio Pianezzola (Italy) Giacomo Piccini

== Standings ==
Points are awarded according to the following structure (except Le Mans):

Position	**1st**	**2nd**	**3rd**	**4th**	**5th**	**6th**	**7th**	**8th**	**9th**	**10th**	**Other**	**Pole**
Points	25	18	15	12	10	8	6	4	2	1	0.5	1

For Le Mans:

Position	**1st**	**2nd**	**3rd**	**4th**	**5th**	**6th**	**7th**	**8th**	**9th**	**Other**	**Pole**
Points	15	9	7	6	5	4	3	2	1	0.5	1

=== LMP3 Teams Championship ===
Pos.	Team	Car	LEC (France)	MNZ (Italy)	LMS (France)		BAR (Spain)	SPA (Belgium)	POR (Portugal)	Points
1	(Luxembourg) #3 DKR Engineering	Norma M30	**2**	2	**6**	1	1	**DSQ**	**3**	100
2	(United Kingdom) #25 Lanan Racing	Norma M30	1	1	4	**2**	WD	1	17	91.5
3	(United Kingdom) #2 Nielsen Racing	Norma M30	3	3	3	5	2	DSQ	2	79
4	(France) #39 Graff	Norma M30	6	15	1	3	**4**	DSQ	7	49.5
5	(Belgium) #98 Motorsport98	Ligier JS P3					5	2	4	40
6	(United Kingdom) #24 United Autosports	Ligier JS P3	9	6	17	7	3			29.5
7	(United Kingdom) #20 Grainmarket Racing	Norma M30	15	4	10	27	9	4	14	29.5
8	(Luxembourg) #11 Racing Experience	Norma M30	4	Ret	27	Ret	6	Ret	6	28.5
9	(Luxembourg) #5 DKR Engineering	Norma M30	8	5	2	Ret	8	12	12	28
10	(United Kingdom) #14 RLR MSport	Ligier JS P3	Ret	Ret	Ret	24	15		1	26
11	(France) #9 Graff	Norma M30	5	11	Ret	11	10	6	15	22
12	(Switzerland) #55 Spirit of Race	Ligier JS P3	Ret	14	9	15	13	3	9	21.5
13	(Spain) #30 CD Sport	Norma M30	7	16	7	21	16	7	13	18
14	(Austria) #90 AT Racing	Ligier JS P3	16	9	22	19	Ret	9	5	15.5
15	(Switzerland) #4 Cool Racing	Ligier JS P3	Ret	10	28	12	11	5	16	13.5
16	(United Kingdom) #23 United Autosports	Ligier JS P3	14	12	15	9	Ret	8	8	12.5
17	(United Kingdom) #22 United Autosports	Ligier JS P3	10	8	19	6	Ret	11	10	12
18	(Denmark) #43 Keo Racing	Ligier JS P3	12	**7**	21	22	14	Ret	11	9.5
19	(Switzerland) #74 Cool Racing	Ligier JS P3	11	13	26	DNS	7	Ret	Ret	7.5
20	(Switzerland) #96 Cool Racing	Ligier JS P3	13	17	11	16	12	10		4
21	(Italy) #69 Monza Garage	Ligier JS P3			Ret	20				0.5
	(United States) #12 Eurointernational	Ligier JS P3	Ret	WD						0
Entries ineligible to score points
	(France) #19 M Racing	Norma M30			5	4				
	(United Kingdom) #15 RLR MSport	Ligier JS P3			8	8				
	(France) #72 Graff	Norma M30			16	10				
	(France) #91 Graff	Norma M30			12	13				
	(United Kingdom) #17 Nielsen Racing	Norma M30			13	23				
	(United Kingdom) #18 Nielsen Racing	Ligier JS P3			20	14				
	(United Kingdom) #27 United Autosports	Ligier JS P3			14	25				
	(Luxembourg) #29 DKR Engineering	Ligier JS P3			24	17				
	(Malaysia) #65 Viper Niza Racing	Ligier JS P3			25	18				
	(Poland) #13 Inter Europol Competition	Ligier JS P3			18	26				
	(Spain) #60 CD Sport	Norma M30			23	28				
	(United Kingdom) #16 BHK Motorsport	Ligier JS P3	Ret	Ret						
	(France) H24 Racing Norman Nato	LMPH2G						WD	WD	

Key
Colour	Result
Gold	Race winner
Silver	2nd place
Bronze	3rd place
Green	Points finish
Blue	Non-points finish
Blue	Non-classified finish (NC)
Purple	Did not finish (Ret)
Black	Disqualified (DSQ)
Black	Excluded (EX)
White	Did not start (DNS)
White	Race cancelled (C)
White	Withdrew (WD)
Blank	Did not participate

**Bold** – Pole
Italics – Fastest Lap

=== GT3 Teams Championship ===
Pos.	Team	Car	LEC (France)	MNZ (Italy)	LMS (France)		BAR (Spain)	SPA (Belgium)	POR (Portugal)	Points
1	(Switzerland) #8 Kessel Racing	Ferrari 488 GT3	1	**2**	10	4	1	1	1	130
2	(United States) #71 Luzich Racing	Ferrari 488 GT3	**3**	1	1	**1**	3	**6**	**4**	109
3	(United Kingdom) #99 Beechdean AMR	Aston Martin Vantage AMR GT3	5	4	**DSQ**	2	4	2	2	80
4	(Switzerland) #51 Spirit of Race	Ferrari 488 GT3	7	3	3	5	6	3	5	69
5	(Germany) #54 SPS Automotive Performance	Mercedes-AMG GT3	2	Ret	7	7	5	4	3	66
6	(Italy) #88 EbiMotors	Porsche 911 GT3 R	Ret	9	8	8	2	5	8	45
7	(Switzerland) #50 Kessel Racing	Ferrari 488 GT3	6	6	13	14	8	7	7	37
8	(Italy) #83 Scuderia Villorba Corse	Lamborghini Huracán GT3	4	8	5	9				26
9	(Italy) #35 Krypton Motorsport	Mercedes-AMG GT3	Ret	5	15	11	**7**	Ret		20
10	(Italy) #7 Scuderia Villorba Corse	Mercedes-AMG GT3	Ret	7	12	15	9	Ret		11.5
Entries ineligible to score points
	(Germany) #40 SPS Automotive Performance	Mercedes-AMG GT3			2	3				
	(Switzerland) #82 Kessel Racing	Ferrari 488 GT3			4	13				
	(Switzerland) #53 Spirit of Race	Ferrari 488 GT3			6	10				
	(United Kingdom) #97 TF Sport	Aston Martin Vantage AMR GT3			11	6				
	(Switzerland) #60 Kessel Racing	Ferrari 488 GT3						Ret	6	
	(Switzerland) #62 Kessel Racing	Ferrari 488 GT3			9	DNS				
	(Switzerland) #52 Spirit of Race	Ferrari 488 GT3			Ret	12				
	(South Africa) #95 Bentley Team Africa	Bentley Continental GT3			14	16				

Key
Colour	Result
Gold	Race winner
Silver	2nd place
Bronze	3rd place
Green	Points finish
Blue	Non-points finish
Blue	Non-classified finish (NC)
Purple	Did not finish (Ret)
Black	Disqualified (DSQ)
Black	Excluded (EX)
White	Did not start (DNS)
White	Race cancelled (C)
White	Withdrew (WD)
Blank	Did not participate

**Bold** – Pole
Italics – Fastest Lap
