= 2017 Road to Le Mans =

Endurance sportscar racing event

The track layout of the Circuit de la Sarthe

The 2nd Road to Le Mans was an automobile endurance event composed of two 55-minute races contested by 49 teams of two drivers each racing Le Mans Prototype 3 (LMP3) and Group GT3 (GT3) cars. It took place on 15 and 17 June 2017 at the Circuit de la Sarthe, near Le Mans, France, as a support event for the 2017 24 Hours of Le Mans and the second round of the 2017 Le Mans Cup. The Automobile Club de l'Ouest (ACO) organised the second Road to Le Mans race in partnership with the FIA World Endurance Championship and the European Le Mans Series promoter Le Mans Endurance Management.

A Ligier JS P3-Nissan shared by John Falb and Sean Rayhall of United Autosports won the first race starting from sixth position. The M.Racing - YMR duo of Alexandre Cougnaud and Romano Ricci finished in second and RLR Msport's Alex Kapadia and Martin Rich were third. The GT3 category was won by the TF Sport pair of Ahmad Al Harthy and Tom Jackson driving an Aston Martin V12 Vantage GT3 after the Spirit of Race Ferrari 458 Italia GT3 of Maurizio Mediani and Christoph Ulrich was penalised for being deemed to have too short of a pit stop. The second race was won by the DKR Engineering team of Jean Glorieux and Alexander Toril over Falb and Rayhall. The M.Racing - YMR team of Erwin Creed and Yann Ehrlacher completed the overall podium in third. Al Harthy and Jackson completed a victory sweep in GT3 after the IMSA Performance team of Thierry Cornac and Raymond Narac was penalised for breaching the minimum pit stop time.

== Background ==
The Automobile Club de l'Ouest (ACO) formally announced the running of the 2017 Road to Le Mans race for Le Mans Prototype 3 (LMP3) and Group GT3 (GT3) cars that were not allowed in the 24 Hours of Le Mans in February 2017. The ACO along with FIA World Endurance Championship and the Le Mans Endurance Management, the promoter of the Le Mans Cup, organised the event. It was held on 15 and 17 June 2017 at the Circuit de la Sarthe, near Le Mans, France. This was the second running of the event, the second round of the 2017 Le Mans Cup and served as a support race for the 2017 24 Hours of Le Mans.

Colin Noble and Anthony Wells led the LMP3 Drivers' Championship with 25 championship points after winning the season-opening round at Monza. They were seven championship points in front of the second-placed Jean Glorieux and Alexander Toril and ten ahead of the third-placed Maurizio Mediani and Claudio Sdanewitsch. Phil Keen and Lee Mowle led the GT3 Drivers' Championship with 25 championship points after winning their class at Monza, seven ahead of Flick Haigh and Joe Osborne in second and ten ahead of Fabio Babini and Emanuele Busnelli in third. The No. 79 Nielsen Racing team led the LMP3 Teams' Championship with 25 championship points, leading the No. 3 DKR Engineering squad by six championship points and the No. 55 Spirit of Race by ten championship points. With 25 championship points, Lee Mowle's No. 7 squad led the GT3 Teams' Championship by seven championship points over the No. 75 Optimum Racing and nine championship points ahead of the No. 46 Ebimotors.

== Regulations and entrants ==
Entry to the race was open from 10 March to 6 April 2017. A total of 46 cars were permitted to enter the race, an increase of four from the 2016 event. The ACO's selection committee had the discretion to prioritise invitations to the LMP3 and GT3 categories from the ACO's continental racing series, the European Le Mans Series (ELMS) and the Asian Le Mans Series (ALMS), as well as the Asian Le Mans Sprint Cup and the IMSA SportsCar Championship. All current Le Mans Cup entries were automatically accepted. Each team was required to sign at least one bronze-rated driver (that is a gentleman driver) and their second driver could hold either a silver or gold-rated licence. Platinum-rated drivers (that is a professional driver) were barred from participating. A driver was permitted no more than 20 minutes to drive on the track. According to the race's regulations, all teams had to make a mandatory pit stop lasting no less than two minutes between the 22nd and 32nd minutes of both races. All competitors in the two categories were eligible to score championship points provided they finished anywhere from first and below. The two pole position winners in each class received one championship point.

The entry list was published by the ACO on 10 May 2017. The 49-car entry list included 33 LMP3 and 16 GT3 vehicles, an increase of 12 on the previous year's race. In addition to the 21 guaranteed Le Mans Cup entries, there were 12 ELMS entries, two from the ALMS while the rest of the field was filled with one-off entries only competing at Le Mans. Many of the LMP3 entries came from the Le Mans Cup and all but five fielded Ligier JS P3-Nissans. The five non-Ligiers were three Norma M30s and one Ginetta-Juno P3-15 and ADESS-03 each. There were seven manufacturers (Aston Martin, Audi, Ferrari, Lamborghini, McLaren, Mercedes-Benz and Porsche) who were represented in the GT3 category. Ben Barker, Richard Bradley, Christian Philippon, Michele Rugolo, and James Winslow were the five drivers and Graff, Gulf Racing UK, Larbre Compétition, Spirit of Race and United Autosports were the five teams competing in both the Road to Le Mans and the 24 Hours of Le Mans.

== Practice ==
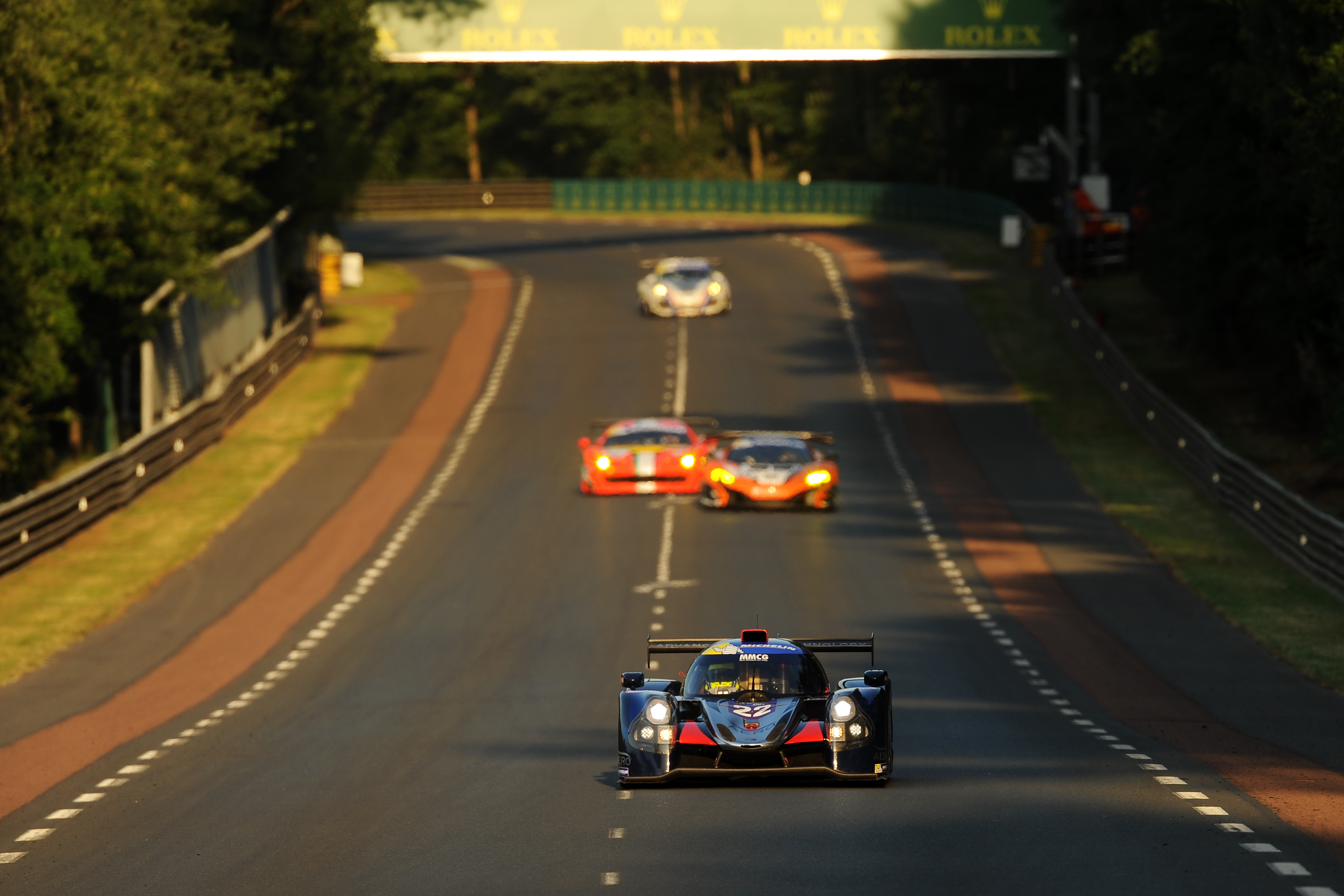
Cars being driven around the circuit during the first free practice session

Two one-hour practice sessions were held on the evening of 14 June and morning of 15 June. Noble lapped fastest overall in the first practice session with a time of 3:57.055 set in the No. 79 Nielsen Racing car. He was 1.054 seconds faster than the second-placed Alexandre Cougnaud's No. 18 M.Racing - YMR entry. The highest-placed Norma vehicle was Toril's No. 3 DKR Engineering car in third. The GT3 category saw all seven manufacturers take the first seven places. Mediani's No. 95 Spirit of Race Ferrari was fastest in class with a lap time of 4:03.821 that was good enough for 10th overall. Gulf Racing's No. 20 Porsche driven by Barker and Steeve Hiesse's No. 8 SVC Sport Management Lamborghini were second and third in class. Some entries had trouble during the session. John Falb's No. 2 United Autosports Ligier suffered an engine failure after completing two laps and Mark Kvamme's No. 85 EuroInternational entry had to enter the pit lane to repair an open door. Sdanewitsch crashed the No. 55 Spirit Ligier against the wall on the run into the Porsche Curves. The session was prematurely ended with seven minutes left to allow for recovery and repairs to the barrier. Sdanewitsch complained of hand pain but was passed fit for the event.

Glorieux's No. 3 DKR Ligier entry set the overall pace of the second practice session with a lap time of 3:51.935. He was more than five seconds faster than the quickest first practice session lap. M.Racing - YMR's No. 19 Norma car of Yann Ehrlacher was second-quickest. Ehrlacher was followed by the fastest of the Ligiers, Rugolo's third-placed No. 55 Spirit entry. The session's six fastest cars lapped faster than Martin Brundle's 2016 pole lap. Six manufacturers occupied the first six positions in the GT3 class. Hiesse's No. 8 SVC Lamborghini was fastest in class with a lap time of 4:01.204 he set in the final minutes of practice. He lapped 2.6 seconds quicker than the best category time set during the first practice session. Ahmad Al Harthy's No. 97 TF Sport Aston Martin was 0.324 seconds behind in second. Duncan Tappy's fastest lap set late in the session in Garage 59's No. 24 McLaren completed the top three in class. There were no incidents of note during the session.

== Qualifying ==
There were two 20-minute qualifying sessions held on the afternoon of 15 June to set the starting order for both races. The first session saw any one driver be allowed by their teams to participate to determine the starting grid for the first race and each team's Bronze-rated driver partook in the second session to set the starting order for the second race. The first session took place in sunny weather conditions. Toril went fastest overall in all three of the circuit's sectors on warm tyres to secure pole position for the first race aboard the No. 3 DKR car with a 3:50.258 lap. Peter Kox qualified the No. 48 Kox Racing vehicle in second and the No. 18 M.Racing - YMR car of Cougnaud was third. Noble qualified the Nielsen car fourth and the second M.Racing - YMR entry was fifth courtesy of a lap from Ehrlacher. Barker's No. 20 Gulf Porsche took pole position in GT3 with a time of 3:56.511. He was 1.3 seconds quicker than Mediani's No. 95 Spirit Ferrari in second. Osborne qualified the No. 75 Optimum Audi in third despite a puncture that restricted him to a single fast lap. Tom Onslow-Cole's No. 5 Ram Racing Mercedes and Keen's No. 7 Lee Mowle car completed the top five in class.

Falb's No. 2 United Autosports entry set the early pace in the second session before it was stopped with nine minutes remaining for an accident involving Alexander Talkanitsa Sr.'s No. 90 AT Racing Ligier car at the Porsche Curves. Talkanitsa was transported to the medical centre for a checkup. Glorieux's No. 3 DKR Ligier vehicle was impeded by the stoppage but took pole position for the second race with a 3:52.563 lap set on his final timed effort to complete a qualifying sweep for DKR. The No. 2 United Autosports car was second ahead of the two RLR Msport entries of Martin Rich and John Farano in third and fourth. Alvaro Fontes's SPV MotorSport entry completed the top five in LMP3. In GT3, Al Harthy set a lap of 4:00.832 on his first quick run in the TF Sport Aston Martin before the red flag stoppage to secure pole position in the category and was fifth overall. Al Harthy remained in the pit lane after the suspension was lifted. He was almost three seconds quicker than the second-placed Busnelli's No. 46 Ebimotors Lamborghini. Haigh's No. 75 Optimum Audi took third, ahead of the two Garage 59 McLarens of Michael Benham and Alexander West in fourth and fifth in class.

=== Qualifying results ===
Teams who set the pole position lap time in each class in the two qualifying sessions are denoted in bold and by a †.

==== First qualifying session ====
Final classification of the first qualifying session
Pos.	Class	No.	Team	Qualifying	Grid
1	**LMP3**	**3**	**(Luxembourg) DKR Engineering**	**3:50.258**	1†
2	LMP3	48	(Netherlands) Kox Racing	3:51.691	2
3	LMP3	18	(France) M.Racing - YMR	3:51.941	3
4	LMP3	79	(United Kingdom) Nielsen Racing	3:52.582	4
5	LMP3	19	(France) M.Racing - YMR	3:53.315	5
6	LMP3	2	(United States) United Autosports	3:53.346	6
7	LMP3	55	(Switzerland) Spirit of Race	3:53.578	7
8	LMP3	49	(Hong Kong) Win Motorsport	3:53.729	8
9	LMP3	99	(France) N'Race	3:53.852	9
10	LMP3	14	(United Kingdom) RLR Msport	3:54.105	10
11	LMP3	22	(United States) United Autosports	3:54.214	11
12	LMP3	11	(France) Duqueine Engineering	3:54.674	12
13	LMP3	89	(France) Graff	3:54.820	13
14	LMP3	10	(France) Duqueine Engineering	3:55.421	14
15	LMP3	98	(Belgium) Motorsport 98	3:56.351	15
16	**GT3**	**20**	**(United Kingdom) Gulf Racing UK**	**3:56.511**	16†
17	LMP3	87	(United Kingdom) RLR Msport	3:57.230	17
18	LMP3	65	(France) Graff	3:57.320	18
19	LMP3	53	(France) M.Racing - YMR	3:57.659	24
20	LMP3	86	(United States) EuroInternational	3:57.679	19
21	GT3	95	(Switzerland) Spirit of Race	3:57.876	20
22	LMP3	66	(France) Graff	3:57.959	27
23	LMP3	85	(United States) EuroInternational	3:58.892	21
24	GT3	75	(United Kingdom) Optimum Racing	3:59.334	22
25	LMP3	6	(Luxembourg) DKR Engineering	3:59.521	23
26	GT3	5	(United Kingdom) Ram Racing	3:59.754	25
27	LMP3	12	(Austria) SVC Sport Management	4:00.290	26
28	GT3	8	(Austria) SVC Sport Management	4:00.380	28
29	GT3	7	(United Kingdom) Lee Mowle	4:00.902	29
30	GT3	24	(United Kingdom) Garage 59	4:00.906	30
31	GT3	76	(France) IMSA Performance	4:01.744	31
32	LMP3	44	(Spain) SPV MotorSport	4:03.155	32
33	LMP3	92	(Japan) TKS	4:03.582	33
34	GT3	88	(United Kingdom) Garage 59	4:03.586	34
35	GT3	97	(United Kingdom) TF Sport	4:05.143	35
36	GT3	46	(Italy) Ebimotors	4:06.310	36
37	LMP3	15	(Spain) By Speed Factory	4:08.603	37
38	LMP3	33	(Spain) BE Motorsport	4:08.956	38
39	LMP3	9	(France) Duqueine Engineering	4:10.503	39
40	LMP3	23	(United States) United Autosports	4:10.552	40
41	LMP3	72	(France) Graff	4:11.637	41
42	GT3	28	(Belgium) Delahaye Racing Team	4:14.239	42
43	GT3	50	(France) Larbre Compétition	4:15.155	43
44	LMP3	4	(France) Cool Racing by GPC	4:18.142	44
45	GT3	93	(Switzerland) Kessel Racing	4:19.083	45
46	GT3	96	(France) IMSA Performance	4:20.464	46
47	LMP3	91	(Luxembourg) DKR Engineering	4:24.993	47
48	LMP3	90	(Austria) AT Racing	No time	48
49	GT3	94	(Switzerland) Spirit of Race	No time	49

==== Second qualifying session ====
Final classification of the second qualifying session
Pos.	Class	No.	Team	Qualifying	Grid
1	**LMP3**	**3**	**(Luxembourg) DKR Engineering**	**3:52.563**	1†
2	LMP3	2	(United States) United Autosports	3:55.510	2
3	LMP3	14	(United Kingdom) RLR Msport	3:59.043	3
4	LMP3	87	(United Kingdom) RLR Msport	4:00.367	4
5	GT3	97	(United Kingdom) TF Sport	4:00.832	5
6	LMP3	44	(Spain) SPV MotorSport	4:00.873	6
7	LMP3	79	(United Kingdom) Nielsen Racing	4:01.468	7
8	LMP3	11	(France) Duqueine Engineering	4:01.549	8
9	LMP3	18	(France) M.Racing - YMR	4:01.565	9
10	LMP3	6	(Luxembourg) DKR Engineering	4:01.870	10
11	LMP3	65	(France) Graff	4:02.075	11
12	LMP3	72	(France) Graff	4:02.185	12
13	LMP3	89	(France) Graff	4:02.296	13
14	LMP3	92	(Japan) TKS	4:02.312	14
15	LMP3	10	(France) Duqueine Engineering	4:02.553	15
16	LMP3	66	(France) Graff	4:02.943	16
17	LMP3	86	(United States) EuroInternational	4:03.440	17
18	**GT3**	**46**	**(Italy) Ebimotors**	**4:03.828**	18†
19	LMP3	85	(United States) EuroInternational	4:06.267	19
20	GT3	75	(United Kingdom) Optimum Racing	4:06.396	20
21	LMP3	33	(Spain) BE Motorsport	4:06.433	21
22	LMP3	53	(France) M.Racing - YMR	4:06.811	22
23	LMP3	49	(Hong Kong) Win Motorsport	4:07.107	23
24	LMP3	23	(United States) United Autosports	4:07.399	24
25	GT3	24	(United Kingdom) Garage 59	4:07.748	25
26	GT3	88	(United Kingdom) Garage 59	4:08.129	26
27	GT3	5	(United Kingdom) Ram Racing	4:08.370	27
28	LMP3	15	(Spain) By Speed Factory	4:08.496	28
29	LMP3	99	(France) N'Race	4:08.750	29
30	LMP3	9	(France) Duqueine Engineering	4:08.787	30
31	GT3	95	(Switzerland) Spirit of Race	4:10.074	31
32	GT3	8	(Austria) SVC Sport Management	4:11.256	32
33	LMP3	4	(France) Cool Racing by GPC	4:11.923	33
34	GT3	55	(Switzerland) Spirit of Race	4:12.136	34
35	GT3	20	(United Kingdom) Gulf Racing UK	4:12.465	35
36	LMP3	22	(United States) United Autosports	4:14.745	36
37	GT3	93	(Switzerland) Kessel Racing	4:15.044	37
38	GT3	7	(United Kingdom) Lee Mowle	4:15.364	50
39	GT3	96	(France) IMSA Performance	4:16.167	38
40	LMP3	48	(Netherlands) Kox Racing	4:18.421	39
41	GT3	94	(Switzerland) Spirit of Race	4:18.775	40
42	GT3	28	(Belgium) Delahaye Racing Team	4:20.604	41
43	GT3	76	(France) IMSA Performance	4:21.173	42
44	LMP3	91	(Luxembourg) DKR Engineering	4:23.381	43
45	LMP3	12	(Austria) SVC Sport Management	No time	44
46	LMP3	19	(France) M.Racing - YMR	No time	45
47	GT3	50	(France) Larbre Compétition	No time	49
48	LMP3	90	(Austria) AT Racing	No time	46
49	LMP3	98	(Belgium) Motorsport 98	No time	47

== Races ==
=== Race one ===
The first race commenced at 17:30 local time on 15 June. It was held in sunny weather conditions ranging from 27.4 to 28.15 °C (81.32 to 82.67 °F) and a track temperature between 35.8 and 36.7 °C (96.4 and 98.1 °F). 49 cars were due to take the start, but the No. 90 AT Racing Ligier was withdrawn from the race due to damage to the car sustained during qualifying and the No. 50 Larbre Compétition entry was also pulled for unknown reasons. When the race started, Toril lost the No. 3 DKR Norma entry's pole position advantage to Kox's No. 48 Kox Racing car but reclaimed the overall lead and led by 1.7 seconds by the conclusion of lap one. The No. 20 Gulf Porsche of Alex Baker held the GT3 lead on the first lap before it was overtaken by Hiesse's SVC Lamborghini and Raymond Narac's No. 76 IMSA Performance Porsche on the following lap. The second lap saw the enforcement of the slow zone procedure for the recovery of Andrew Cummings's No. 44 SPV Ligier. Two laps later, Narac passed Hiesse for the GT3 category lead. Following the mandatory pit stops, the No. 2 United Autosports vehicle of Sean Rayhall was promoted to the race lead ahead of Rich's No. 14 RLR Msport entry after setting a series of fast lap times and overtaking the battling duo of Rich and Ricci.

Toril had been leading by ten seconds when he was required to reduce his pace for a slow zone enforced by the recovery of Yojiro Terada's No. 91 DKR vehicle after he collided with the barrier and was hit by the second-placed car of Cougnaud, who was running at racing speed. Toril had to retire the No. 3 DKR car from the race due to suspension damage. The No. 19 M.Racing - YMR vehicle of Ehrlacher was forced to retire in the pit lane with technical issues. Rayhall pulled away for the remainder of the race to claim victory for the No. 2 United Autosports team by 5.6 seconds ahead of the No. 18 M.Racing - YMR car. The No. 14 RLR MSport duo of Alex Kapadia and Rich completed the podium in third, having started in 10th position. The No. 95 Spirit Ferrari was the first across the start-finish line in GT3 but was penalised eight seconds on the final lap because the car's pit stop was deemed to be too short. This demoted the No. 95 Spirit Ferrari to second in the category after the No. 7 Lee Mowle was imposed a two-lap penalty for making its pit stop outside the allocated time period. The TF Sport Aston Martin was thus promoted to the class victory, making Al Harthy the first Omani driver to take a podium result at Le Mans and giving Tom Jackson a win on his GT3 race debut.

==== Race one classification ====
Winners in each class are denoted in bold and ‡.

Final classification of the first race
Pos	Class	No.	Team	Drivers	Chassis	Tyre	Laps	Time/Reason
Pos	Class	No.	Team	Drivers	Engine	Tyre	Laps	Time/Reason
1	**LMP3**	**2**	**(United States) United Autosports**	**(United States) John Falb** **(United States) Sean Rayhall**	**Ligier JS P3**	M	**13**	**55:10.699‡**
1	**LMP3**	**2**	**(United States) United Autosports**	**(United States) John Falb** **(United States) Sean Rayhall**	**Nissan VK50VE 5.0L V8**	M	**13**	**55:10.699‡**
2	LMP3	18	(France) M.Racing - YMR	(France) Alexandre Cougnaud (France) Romano Ricci	Ligier JS P3	M	13	+5.634
2	LMP3	18	(France) M.Racing - YMR	(France) Alexandre Cougnaud (France) Romano Ricci	Nissan VK50VE 5.0L V8	M	13	+5.634
3	LMP3	14	(United Kingdom) RLR MSport	(United Kingdom) Alex Kapadia (United Kingdom) Martin Rich	Ligier JS P3	M	13	+9.362
3	LMP3	14	(United Kingdom) RLR MSport	(United Kingdom) Alex Kapadia (United Kingdom) Martin Rich	Nissan VK50VE 5.0L V8	M	13	+9.362
4	LMP3	53	(France) M.Racing - YMR	(France) Natan Bihel (France) Laurent Millara	Ligier JS P3	M	13	+1:32.341
4	LMP3	53	(France) M.Racing - YMR	(France) Natan Bihel (France) Laurent Millara	Nissan VK50VE 5.0L V8	M	13	+1:32.341
5	LMP3	87	(United Kingdom) RLR MSport	(Denmark) Morten Dons (Canada) John Farano	Ligier JS P3	M	13	+1:34.498
5	LMP3	87	(United Kingdom) RLR MSport	(Denmark) Morten Dons (Canada) John Farano	Nissan VK50VE 5.0L V8	M	13	+1:34.498
6	LMP3	98	(Belgium) Motorsport 98	(Belgium) Eric De Doncker (United Kingdom) Andy Meyrick	Ligier JS P3	M	13	+1:35.946
6	LMP3	98	(Belgium) Motorsport 98	(Belgium) Eric De Doncker (United Kingdom) Andy Meyrick	Nissan VK50VE 5.0L V8	M	13	+1:35.946
7	LMP3	22	(United States) United Autosports	(United Kingdom) Matthew Bell (United States) Jim McGuire	Ligier JS P3	M	13	+1:40.996
7	LMP3	22	(United States) United Autosports	(United Kingdom) Matthew Bell (United States) Jim McGuire	Nissan VK50VE 5.0L V8	M	13	+1:40.996
8	LMP3	89	(France) Graff	(Australia) Greg Taylor (United Kingdom) James Winslow	Ligier JS P3	M	13	+1:43.369
8	LMP3	89	(France) Graff	(Australia) Greg Taylor (United Kingdom) James Winslow	Nissan VK50VE 5.0L V8	M	13	+1:43.369
9	LMP3	99	(France) N'Race	(France) Alain Costa (France) Jordan Perroy	Ligier JS P3	M	13	+1:53.418
9	LMP3	99	(France) N'Race	(France) Alain Costa (France) Jordan Perroy	Nissan VK50VE 5.0L V8	M	13	+1:53.418
10	LMP3	49	(Hong Kong) Win Motorsport	(United Kingdom) Richard Bradley (Hong Kong) William Lok	Ligier JS P3	M	13	+1:53.687
10	LMP3	49	(Hong Kong) Win Motorsport	(United Kingdom) Richard Bradley (Hong Kong) William Lok	Nissan VK50VE 5.0L V8	M	13	+1:53.687
11	LMP3	55	(Switzerland) Spirit of Race	(Germany) Claudio Sdanewitsch (Italy) Michele Rugolo	Ligier JS P3	M	13	+1:57.086
11	LMP3	55	(Switzerland) Spirit of Race	(Germany) Claudio Sdanewitsch (Italy) Michele Rugolo	Nissan VK50VE 5.0L V8	M	13	+1:57.086
12	LMP3	79	(United Kingdom) Nielsen Racing	(United Kingdom) Colin Noble (United Kingdom) Anthony Wells	Ligier JS P3	M	13	+1:59.418
12	LMP3	79	(United Kingdom) Nielsen Racing	(United Kingdom) Colin Noble (United Kingdom) Anthony Wells	Nissan VK50VE 5.0L V8	M	13	+1:59.418
13	LMP3	65	(France) Graff	(France) Émilien Carde (France) Adrien Chila	Ligier JS P3	M	13	+2:01.871
13	LMP3	65	(France) Graff	(France) Émilien Carde (France) Adrien Chila	Nissan VK50VE 5.0L V8	M	13	+2:01.871
14	LMP3	48	(Netherlands) Kox Racing	(Netherlands) Peter Kox (Netherlands) Nico Pronk	Ligier JS P3	M	13	+2:16.016
14	LMP3	48	(Netherlands) Kox Racing	(Netherlands) Peter Kox (Netherlands) Nico Pronk	Nissan VK50VE 5.0L V8	M	13	+2:16.016
15	LMP3	86	(United States) EuroInternational	(Australia) Ricky Capo (Italy) Andrea Dromedari	Ligier JS P3	M	13	+2:22.594
15	LMP3	86	(United States) EuroInternational	(Australia) Ricky Capo (Italy) Andrea Dromedari	Nissan VK50VE 5.0L V8	M	13	+2:22.594
16	LMP3	66	(France) Graff	(Australia) Scott Andrews (Australia) John Corbett	Ligier JS P3	M	13	+2:23.129
16	LMP3	66	(France) Graff	(Australia) Scott Andrews (Australia) John Corbett	Nissan VK50VE 5.0L V8	M	13	+2:23.129
17	LMP3	12	(Austria) SVC Sport Management	(Italy) Marco Cencetti (Italy) Marcello Marateotto	Ligier JS P3	M	13	+2:37.210
17	LMP3	12	(Austria) SVC Sport Management	(Italy) Marco Cencetti (Italy) Marcello Marateotto	Nissan VK50VE 5.0L V8	M	13	+2:37.210
18	**GT3**	**97**	**(United Kingdom) TF Sport**	**(Oman) Ahmad Al Harthy** **(United Kingdom) Tom Jackson**	**Aston Martin V12 Vantage GT3**	M	**13**	**+2:42.128‡**
18	**GT3**	**97**	**(United Kingdom) TF Sport**	**(Oman) Ahmad Al Harthy** **(United Kingdom) Tom Jackson**	**Aston Martin 6.0 L V12**	M	**13**	**+2:42.128‡**
19	LMP3	85	(United States) EuroInternational	(United States) Mark Kvamme (Venezuela) Alex Popow	Ligier JS P3	M	13	+3:02.396
19	LMP3	85	(United States) EuroInternational	(United States) Mark Kvamme (Venezuela) Alex Popow	Nissan VK50VE 5.0L V8	M	13	+3:02.396
20	LMP3	6	(Luxembourg) DKR Engineering	(Hong Kong) Edgar Lau (France) Jacques Wolf	Norma M30	M	13	+3:09.528
20	LMP3	6	(Luxembourg) DKR Engineering	(Hong Kong) Edgar Lau (France) Jacques Wolf	Nissan VK50VE 5.0L V8	M	13	+3:09.528
21	GT3	95	(Switzerland) Spirit of Race	(Italy) Maurizio Mediani (Switzerland) Christoph Ulrich	Ferrari 458 Italia GT3	M	13	+3:13.465
21	GT3	95	(Switzerland) Spirit of Race	(Italy) Maurizio Mediani (Switzerland) Christoph Ulrich	Ferrari F136 4.5 L V8	M	13	+3:13.465
22	GT3	46	(Italy) Ebimotors	(Italy) Fabio Babini (Italy) Emanuele Busnelli	Lamborghini Huracán GT3	M	13	+3:16.830
22	GT3	46	(Italy) Ebimotors	(Italy) Fabio Babini (Italy) Emanuele Busnelli	Lamborghini 5.2 L V10	M	13	+3:16.830
23	LMP3	72	(France) Graff	(France) Philippe Cimadomo (France) Thomas Dagoneau	Ligier JS P3	M	13	+3:20.460
23	LMP3	72	(France) Graff	(France) Philippe Cimadomo (France) Thomas Dagoneau	Nissan VK50VE 5.0L V8	M	13	+3:20.460
24	GT3	5	(United Kingdom) Ram Racing	(United Kingdom) Tom Onslow-Cole (Netherlands) Remon Leonard Vos	Mercedes-AMG GT3	M	13	+3:28.139
24	GT3	5	(United Kingdom) Ram Racing	(United Kingdom) Tom Onslow-Cole (Netherlands) Remon Leonard Vos	Mercedes-AMG M159 6.2 L V8	M	13	+3:28.139
25	GT3	8	(Austria) SVC Sport Management	(France) Steeve Hiesse (France) Cédric Mézard	Lamborghini Huracán GT3	M	13	+3:28.418
25	GT3	8	(Austria) SVC Sport Management	(France) Steeve Hiesse (France) Cédric Mézard	Lamborghini 5.2 L V10	M	13	+3:28.418
26	GT3	24	(United Kingdom) Garage 59	(United Kingdom) Michael Benham (United Kingdom) Duncan Tappy	McLaren 650S GT3	M	13	+3:39.840
26	GT3	24	(United Kingdom) Garage 59	(United Kingdom) Michael Benham (United Kingdom) Duncan Tappy	McLaren M838T 3.8 L twin-turbo V8	M	13	+3:39.840
27	GT3	76	(France) IMSA Performance	(France) Thierry Cornac (France) Raymond Narac	Porsche 911 GT3 R	M	13	+3:52.643
27	GT3	76	(France) IMSA Performance	(France) Thierry Cornac (France) Raymond Narac	Porsche 4.0 L Flat-6	M	13	+3:52.643
28	GT3	88	(United Kingdom) Garage 59	(United Kingdom) Chris Goodwin (Sweden) Alexander West	McLaren 650S GT3	M	13	+4:00.087
28	GT3	88	(United Kingdom) Garage 59	(United Kingdom) Chris Goodwin (Sweden) Alexander West	McLaren M838T 3.8 L twin-turbo V8	M	13	+4:00.087
29	LMP3	92	(Japan) TKS	(Japan) Shinyo Sano (Japan) Takuya Shirasaka	Ginetta-Juno P3-15	M	13	+4:02.615
29	LMP3	92	(Japan) TKS	(Japan) Shinyo Sano (Japan) Takuya Shirasaka	Nissan VK50VE 5.0L V8	M	13	+4:02.615
30	LMP3	23	(United States) United Autosports	(United Kingdom) Richard Meins (United Kingdom) Shaun Lynn	Ligier JS P3	M	12	+1 Lap
30	LMP3	23	(United States) United Autosports	(United Kingdom) Richard Meins (United Kingdom) Shaun Lynn	Nissan VK50VE 5.0L V8	M	12	+1 Lap
31	LMP3	10	(France) Duqueine Engineering	(Switzerland) Antonin Borga (Switzerland) Lucas Borga	Ligier JS P3	M	12	+1 Lap
31	LMP3	10	(France) Duqueine Engineering	(Switzerland) Antonin Borga (Switzerland) Lucas Borga	Nissan VK50VE 5.0L V8	M	12	+1 Lap
32	GT3	75	(United Kingdom) Optimum Racing	(United Kingdom) Flick Haigh (United Kingdom) Joe Osborne	Audi R8 LMS	M	12	+1 Lap
32	GT3	75	(United Kingdom) Optimum Racing	(United Kingdom) Flick Haigh (United Kingdom) Joe Osborne	Audi 5.2 L V10	M	12	+1 Lap
33	LMP3	9	(France) Duqueine Engineering	(United States) Joël Janco (United States) Gerry Kraut	Ligier JS P3	M	12	+1 Lap
33	LMP3	9	(France) Duqueine Engineering	(United States) Joël Janco (United States) Gerry Kraut	Nissan VK50VE 5.0L V8	M	12	+1 Lap
34	LMP3	4	(France) Cool Racing by GPC	(Switzerland) Alexandre Coigny (Switzerland) Gino Forgione	Ligier JS P3	M	12	+1 Lap
34	LMP3	4	(France) Cool Racing by GPC	(Switzerland) Alexandre Coigny (Switzerland) Gino Forgione	Nissan VK50VE 5.0L V8	M	12	+1 Lap
35	GT3	28	(Belgium) Delahaye Racing Team	(France) Pierre-Étienne Bordet (France) Alexandre Viron	Porsche 911 GT3 R	M	12	+1 Lap
35	GT3	28	(Belgium) Delahaye Racing Team	(France) Pierre-Étienne Bordet (France) Alexandre Viron	Porsche 4.0 L Flat-6	M	12	+1 Lap
36	GT3	94	(Switzerland) Spirit of Race	(Netherlands) Martin Lanting (Belgium) Patrick Van Glabeke	Ferrari 488 GT3	M	12	+1 Lap
36	GT3	94	(Switzerland) Spirit of Race	(Netherlands) Martin Lanting (Belgium) Patrick Van Glabeke	Ferrari F154CB 3.9 L Turbo V8	M	12	+1 Lap
37	GT3	93	(Switzerland) Kessel Racing	(France) Deborah Mayer (Italy) Claudio Schiavoni	Ferrari 458 Italia GT3	M	12	+1 Lap
37	GT3	93	(Switzerland) Kessel Racing	(France) Deborah Mayer (Italy) Claudio Schiavoni	Ferrari F136 4.5 L V8	M	12	+1 Lap
38	LMP3	44	(Spain) SPV MotorSport	(Spain) Álvaro Fontes (United Kingdom) Andrew Cummings	Ligier JS P3	M	12	+1 Lap
38	LMP3	44	(Spain) SPV MotorSport	(Spain) Álvaro Fontes (United Kingdom) Andrew Cummings	Nissan VK50VE 5.0L V8	M	12	+1 Lap
39	GT3	7	(United Kingdom) Lee Mowle	(United Kingdom) Lee Mowle (United Kingdom) Phil Keen	Mercedes-AMG GT3	M	11	+2 Laps
39	GT3	7	(United Kingdom) Lee Mowle	(United Kingdom) Lee Mowle (United Kingdom) Phil Keen	Mercedes-AMG M159 6.2 L V8	M	11	+2 Laps
40	LMP3	15	(Spain) By Speed Factory	(Netherlands) Ate de Jong (South Korea) Tacksung Kim	Ligier JS P3	M	11	+2 Laps
40	LMP3	15	(Spain) By Speed Factory	(Netherlands) Ate de Jong (South Korea) Tacksung Kim	Nissan VK50VE 5.0L V8	M	11	+2 Laps
41	GT3	20	(United Kingdom) Gulf Racing UK	(United Kingdom) Andrew Baker (United Kingdom) Ben Barker	Porsche 911 GT3 R	M	10	+3 Laps
41	GT3	20	(United Kingdom) Gulf Racing UK	(United Kingdom) Andrew Baker (United Kingdom) Ben Barker	Porsche 4.0 L Flat-6	M	10	+3 Laps
42	LMP3	11	(France) Duqueine Engineering	(Switzerland) Lucas Légeret (France) Nicolas Melin	Ligier JS P3	M	8	Did not finish
42	LMP3	11	(France) Duqueine Engineering	(Switzerland) Lucas Légeret (France) Nicolas Melin	Nissan VK50VE 5.0L V8	M	8	Did not finish
43	LMP3	19	(France) M.Racing - YMR	(France) Erwin Creed (France) Yann Ehrlacher	Norma M30	M	7	Did not finish
43	LMP3	19	(France) M.Racing - YMR	(France) Erwin Creed (France) Yann Ehrlacher	Nissan VK50VE 5.0L V8	M	7	Did not finish
44	LMP3	33	(Spain) BE Motorsport	(Spain) Javier Ibrán (Netherlands) Dirk Waaijenberg	Ligier JS P3	M	7	Did not finish
44	LMP3	33	(Spain) BE Motorsport	(Spain) Javier Ibrán (Netherlands) Dirk Waaijenberg	Nissan VK50VE 5.0L V8	M	7	Did not finish
45	LMP3	3	(Luxembourg) DKR Engineering	(Belgium) Jean Glorieux (Spain) Alexander Toril	Norma M30	M	6	Did not finish
45	LMP3	3	(Luxembourg) DKR Engineering	(Belgium) Jean Glorieux (Spain) Alexander Toril	Nissan VK50VE 5.0L V8	M	6	Did not finish
46	LMP3	91	(Luxembourg) DKR Engineering	(France) Sylvain Boulay (Japan) Yojiro Terada	ADESS-03	M	4	Did not finish
46	LMP3	91	(Luxembourg) DKR Engineering	(France) Sylvain Boulay (Japan) Yojiro Terada	Nissan VK50VE 5.0L V8	M	4	Did not finish
47	GT3	96	(France) IMSA Performance	(France) Michel Ettouati (France) Franck Racinet	Porsche 911 GT3 R	M	1	Did not finish
47	GT3	96	(France) IMSA Performance	(France) Michel Ettouati (France) Franck Racinet	Porsche 4.0 L Flat-6	M	1	Did not finish
48	LMP3	90	(Austria) AT Racing	(Belarus) Alexander Talkanitsa Jr. (Belarus) Alexander Talkanitsa Sr.	Ligier JS P3	M	0	Did not start
48	LMP3	90	(Austria) AT Racing	(Belarus) Alexander Talkanitsa Jr. (Belarus) Alexander Talkanitsa Sr.	Nissan VK50VE 5.0L V8	M	0	Did not start
49	GT3	50	(France) Larbre Compétition	(France) Franck Labescat (France) Christian Philippon	Mercedes-Benz SLS AMG GT3	M	0	Did not start
49	GT3	50	(France) Larbre Compétition	(France) Franck Labescat (France) Christian Philippon	Mercedes-AMG M159 6.2 L V8	M	0	Did not start

=== Race two ===
The second race commenced at 11:30 local time on 17 June. It again took place in sunny weather conditions but with the air temperature between 23 and 25.3 °C (73.4 and 77.5 °F) and the track temperature at 26 °C (79 °F). 49 cars were due to take the start, but the No. 4 Cool Racing by GPC car failed to start for unknown reasons. The No. 3 DKR car of Glorieux maintained its pole position advantage into the first turn. Both of the EuroInternational Ligiers and the No. 66 Graff entry retired for unknown reasons on the first lap. Three laps later, Glorieux spun the No. 3 DKR Norma vehicle on the run into the Dunlop chicane and dropped to fourth overall, losing the race lead to Falb's No. 2 United Autosports entry. The TF Sport Aston Martin of Al Harthy had held the lead in GT3 for the opening four laps before he was passed by the No. 95 Spirit Ferrari of Mediani on lap five. That same lap saw Falb lose the overall lead to Lucas Légeret's No. 11 Duqueine Engineering Ligier car. Glorieux overtook the No. 87 RLR Msport of Farano for third overall just before the mandatory pit stops.

Following the pit stops, the No. 3 DKR entry of Toril returned to the race lead after overtaking Rayhall's No. 2 United Autosports car and then Nicolas Melin No. 11 Duqueine entry at the Dunlop Curve. The No. 87 RLR Msport car of Farano was forced to retire when it suffered a rear suspension failure after mounting the kerbs at the Ford Chicane. Ulrich in the No. 95 Spirit Ferrari was leading GT3 when he spun into the gravel trap at Dunlop Curve and retired after getting stuck in the gravel. Jackson thus inherited the category lead until the IMSA Performance Porsche of Narac overtook him at the Esses on lap nine. The IMSA Performance car was later imposed a three-second stop-and-hold penalty for breaching the minimum pit stop time and Narac took the penalty on the final lap. Toril extended his advantage over the rest of the field and secured victory for the No. 3 DKR squad that moved him, DRK and Glorieux to the LMP3 Drivers' and Teams' Championship lead. The No. 2 United Autosports team finished 17.706 seconds behind in second. M.Racing - YMR's No. 19 entry was third after Ehrlacher came from outside the top ten in the second half of the race. This came after Noble spun and crashed the Nielsen car at Tetre Rouge while avoiding a slow Porsche. Jackson inherited the GT3 lead after Narac's penalty and clinched the class win by five seconds to complete a victory sweep at Le Mans for the GT3 Drivers' and Teams' Championship leads. The No. 24 Garage 59 team took second in class and the SVC Lamborghini was third after Hiesse moved up the order in the final laps.

==== Race two classification ====
Winners in each class are denoted in bold and ‡.

Final classification of the second race
Pos	Class	No.	Team	Drivers	Chassis	Tyre	Laps	Time/Reason
Pos	Class	No.	Team	Drivers	Engine	Tyre	Laps	Time/Reason
1	**LMP3**	**3**	**(Luxembourg) DKR Engineering**	**(Belgium) Jean Glorieux** **(Spain) Alexander Toril**	**Norma M30**	M	**13**	**57:07.299‡**
1	**LMP3**	**3**	**(Luxembourg) DKR Engineering**	**(Belgium) Jean Glorieux** **(Spain) Alexander Toril**	**Nissan VK50VE 5.0L V8**	M	**13**	**57:07.299‡**
2	LMP3	2	(United States) United Autosports	(United States) John Falb (United States) Sean Rayhall	Ligier JS P3	M	13	+17.706
2	LMP3	2	(United States) United Autosports	(United States) John Falb (United States) Sean Rayhall	Nissan VK50VE 5.0L V8	M	13	+17.706
3	LMP3	19	(France) M.Racing - YMR	(France) Erwin Creed (France) Yann Ehrlacher	Norma M30	M	13	+43.746
3	LMP3	19	(France) M.Racing - YMR	(France) Erwin Creed (France) Yann Ehrlacher	Nissan VK50VE 5.0L V8	M	13	+43.746
4	LMP3	89	(France) Graff	(Australia) Greg Taylor (United Kingdom) James Winslow	Ligier JS P3	M	13	+50.362
4	LMP3	89	(France) Graff	(Australia) Greg Taylor (United Kingdom) James Winslow	Nissan VK50VE 5.0L V8	M	13	+50.362
5	LMP3	6	(Luxembourg) DKR Engineering	(Hong Kong) Edgar Lau (France) Jacques Wolf	Norma M30	M	13	+52.909
5	LMP3	6	(Luxembourg) DKR Engineering	(Hong Kong) Edgar Lau (France) Jacques Wolf	Nissan VK50VE 5.0L V8	M	13	+52.909
6	LMP3	99	(France) N'Race	(France) Alain Costa (France) Jordan Perroy	Ligier JS P3	M	13	+1:10.912
6	LMP3	99	(France) N'Race	(France) Alain Costa (France) Jordan Perroy	Nissan VK50VE 5.0L V8	M	13	+1:10.912
7	LMP3	18	(France) M.Racing - YMR	(France) Alexandre Cougnaud (France) Romano Ricci	Ligier JS P3	M	13	+1:20.340
7	LMP3	18	(France) M.Racing - YMR	(France) Alexandre Cougnaud (France) Romano Ricci	Nissan VK50VE 5.0L V8	M	13	+1:20.340
8	LMP3	65	(France) Graff	(France) Émilien Carde (France) Adrien Chila	Ligier JS P3	M	13	+1:21.832
8	LMP3	65	(France) Graff	(France) Émilien Carde (France) Adrien Chila	Nissan VK50VE 5.0L V8	M	13	+1:21.832
9	LMP3	98	(Belgium) Motorsport 98	(Belgium) Eric De Doncker (United Kingdom) Andy Meyrick	Ligier JS P3	M	13	+1:33.721
9	LMP3	98	(Belgium) Motorsport 98	(Belgium) Eric De Doncker (United Kingdom) Andy Meyrick	Nissan VK50VE 5.0L V8	M	13	+1:33.721
10	LMP3	92	(Japan) TKS	(Japan) Shinyo Sano (Japan) Takuya Shirasaka	Ginetta-Juno P3-15	M	13	+1:35.661
10	LMP3	92	(Japan) TKS	(Japan) Shinyo Sano (Japan) Takuya Shirasaka	Nissan VK50VE 5.0L V8	M	13	+1:35.661
11	LMP3	49	(Hong Kong) Win Motorsport	(United Kingdom) Richard Bradley (Hong Kong) William Lok	Ligier JS P3	M	13	+1:44.682
11	LMP3	49	(Hong Kong) Win Motorsport	(United Kingdom) Richard Bradley (Hong Kong) William Lok	Nissan VK50VE 5.0L V8	M	13	+1:44.682
12	LMP3	48	(Netherlands) Kox Racing	(Netherlands) Peter Kox (Netherlands) Nico Pronk	Ligier JS P3	M	13	+1:52.735
12	LMP3	48	(Netherlands) Kox Racing	(Netherlands) Peter Kox (Netherlands) Nico Pronk	Nissan VK50VE 5.0L V8	M	13	+1:52.735
13	LMP3	11	(France) Duqueine Engineering	(Switzerland) Lucas Légeret (France) Nicolas Melin	Ligier JS P3	M	13	+1:54.646
13	LMP3	11	(France) Duqueine Engineering	(Switzerland) Lucas Légeret (France) Nicolas Melin	Nissan VK50VE 5.0L V8	M	13	+1:54.646
14	**GT3**	**97**	**(United Kingdom) TF Sport**	**(Oman) Ahmad Al Harthy** **(United Kingdom) Tom Jackson**	**Aston Martin V12 Vantage GT3**	M	**13**	**+1:57.323‡**
14	**GT3**	**97**	**(United Kingdom) TF Sport**	**(Oman) Ahmad Al Harthy** **(United Kingdom) Tom Jackson**	**Aston Martin 6.0 L V12**	M	**13**	**+1:57.323‡**
15	LMP3	53	(France) M.Racing - YMR	(France) Natan Bihel (France) Laurent Millara	Ligier JS P3	M	13	+1:58.342
15	LMP3	53	(France) M.Racing - YMR	(France) Natan Bihel (France) Laurent Millara	Nissan VK50VE 5.0L V8	M	13	+1:58.342
16	LMP3	90	(Austria) AT Racing	(Belarus) Alexander Talkanitsa Jr. (Belarus) Alexander Talkanitsa Sr.	Ligier JS P3	M	13	+1:59.396
16	LMP3	90	(Austria) AT Racing	(Belarus) Alexander Talkanitsa Jr. (Belarus) Alexander Talkanitsa Sr.	Nissan VK50VE 5.0L V8	M	13	+1:59.396
17	GT3	24	(United Kingdom) Garage 59	(United Kingdom) Michael Benham (United Kingdom) Duncan Tappy	McLaren 650S GT3	M	13	+2:02.335
17	GT3	24	(United Kingdom) Garage 59	(United Kingdom) Michael Benham (United Kingdom) Duncan Tappy	McLaren M838T 3.8 L twin-turbo V8	M	13	+2:02.335
18	GT3	8	(Austria) SVC Sport Management	(France) Steeve Hiesse (France) Cédric Mézard	Lamborghini Huracán GT3	M	13	+2:06.659
18	GT3	8	(Austria) SVC Sport Management	(France) Steeve Hiesse (France) Cédric Mézard	Lamborghini 5.2 L V10	M	13	+2:06.659
19	GT3	5	(United Kingdom) Ram Racing	(United Kingdom) Tom Onslow-Cole (Netherlands) Remon Leonard Vos	Mercedes-AMG GT3	M	13	+2:10.789
19	GT3	5	(United Kingdom) Ram Racing	(United Kingdom) Tom Onslow-Cole (Netherlands) Remon Leonard Vos	Mercedes-AMG M159 6.2 L V8	M	13	+2:10.789
20	LMP3	22	(United States) United Autosports	(United Kingdom) Matthew Bell (United States) Jim McGuire	Ligier JS P3	M	13	+2:34.870
20	LMP3	22	(United States) United Autosports	(United Kingdom) Matthew Bell (United States) Jim McGuire	Nissan VK50VE 5.0L V8	M	13	+2:34.870
21	GT3	88	(United Kingdom) Garage 59	(United Kingdom) Chris Goodwin (Sweden) Alexander West	McLaren 650S GT3	M	13	+2:40.446
21	GT3	88	(United Kingdom) Garage 59	(United Kingdom) Chris Goodwin (Sweden) Alexander West	McLaren M838T 3.8 L twin-turbo V8	M	13	+2:40.446
22	LMP3	72	(France) Graff	(France) Philippe Cimadomo (France) Thomas Dagoneau	Ligier JS P3	M	13	+2:42.329
22	LMP3	72	(France) Graff	(France) Philippe Cimadomo (France) Thomas Dagoneau	Nissan VK50VE 5.0L V8	M	13	+2:42.329
23	LMP3	44	(Spain) SPV MotorSport	(Spain) Álvaro Fontes (United Kingdom) Andrew Cummings	Ligier JS P3	M	13	+2:43.760
23	LMP3	44	(Spain) SPV MotorSport	(Spain) Álvaro Fontes (United Kingdom) Andrew Cummings	Nissan VK50VE 5.0L V8	M	13	+2:43.760
24	GT3	7	(United Kingdom) Lee Mowle	(United Kingdom) Lee Mowle (United Kingdom) Phil Keen	Mercedes-AMG GT3	M	13	+2:44.880
24	GT3	7	(United Kingdom) Lee Mowle	(United Kingdom) Lee Mowle (United Kingdom) Phil Keen	Mercedes-AMG M159 6.2 L V8	M	13	+2:44.880
25	LMP3	23	(United States) United Autosports	(United Kingdom) Richard Meins (United Kingdom) Shaun Lynn	Ligier JS P3	M	13	+2:46.265
25	LMP3	23	(United States) United Autosports	(United Kingdom) Richard Meins (United Kingdom) Shaun Lynn	Nissan VK50VE 5.0L V8	M	13	+2:46.265
26	LMP3	15	(Spain) By Speed Factory	(Netherlands) Ate de Jong (South Korea) Tacksung Kim	Ligier JS P3	M	13	+3:14.532
26	LMP3	15	(Spain) By Speed Factory	(Netherlands) Ate de Jong (South Korea) Tacksung Kim	Nissan VK50VE 5.0L V8	M	13	+3:14.532
27	LMP3	9	(France) Duqueine Engineering	(United States) Joël Janco (United States) Gerry Kraut	Ligier JS P3	M	13	+3:16.006
27	LMP3	9	(France) Duqueine Engineering	(United States) Joël Janco (United States) Gerry Kraut	Nissan VK50VE 5.0L V8	M	13	+3:16.006
28	GT3	93	(Switzerland) Kessel Racing	(France) Deborah Mayer (Italy) Claudio Schiavoni	Ferrari 458 Italia GT3	M	13	+4:34.396
28	GT3	93	(Switzerland) Kessel Racing	(France) Deborah Mayer (Italy) Claudio Schiavoni	Ferrari F136 4.5 L V8	M	13	+4:34.396
29	LMP3	79	(United Kingdom) Nielsen Racing	(United Kingdom) Colin Noble (United Kingdom) Anthony Wells	Ligier JS P3	M	12	+1 Lap
29	LMP3	79	(United Kingdom) Nielsen Racing	(United Kingdom) Colin Noble (United Kingdom) Anthony Wells	Nissan VK50VE 5.0L V8	M	12	+1 Lap
30	LMP3	12	(Austria) SVC Sport Management	(Italy) Marco Cencetti (Italy) Marcello Marateotto	Ligier JS P3	M	12	+1 Lap
30	LMP3	12	(Austria) SVC Sport Management	(Italy) Marco Cencetti (Italy) Marcello Marateotto	Nissan VK50VE 5.0L V8	M	12	+1 Lap
31	GT3	50	(France) Larbre Compétition	(France) Franck Labescat (France) Christian Philippon	Mercedes-Benz SLS AMG GT3	M	12	+1 Lap
31	GT3	50	(France) Larbre Compétition	(France) Franck Labescat (France) Christian Philippon	Mercedes-AMG M159 6.2 L V8	M	12	+1 Lap
32	GT3	28	(Belgium) Delahaye Racing Team	(France) Pierre-Étienne Bordet (France) Alexandre Viron	Porsche 911 GT3 R	M	12	+1 Lap
32	GT3	28	(Belgium) Delahaye Racing Team	(France) Pierre-Étienne Bordet (France) Alexandre Viron	Porsche 4.0 L Flat-6	M	12	+1 Lap
33	GT3	94	(Switzerland) Spirit of Race	(Netherlands) Martin Lanting (Belgium) Patrick Van Glabeke	Ferrari 488 GT3	M	12	+1 Lap
33	GT3	94	(Switzerland) Spirit of Race	(Netherlands) Martin Lanting (Belgium) Patrick Van Glabeke	Ferrari F154CB 3.9 L Turbo V8	M	12	+1 Lap
34	GT3	96	(France) IMSA Performance	(France) Michel Ettouati (France) Franck Racinet	Porsche 911 GT3 R	M	12	+1 Lap
34	GT3	96	(France) IMSA Performance	(France) Michel Ettouati (France) Franck Racinet	Porsche 4.0 L Flat-6	M	12	+1 Lap
35	LMP3	91	(Luxembourg) DKR Engineering	(France) Sylvain Boulay (Japan) Yojiro Terada	ADESS-03	M	12	+1 Lap
35	LMP3	91	(Luxembourg) DKR Engineering	(France) Sylvain Boulay (Japan) Yojiro Terada	Nissan VK50VE 5.0L V8	M	12	+1 Lap
36	GT3	46	(Italy) Ebimotors	(Italy) Fabio Babini (Italy) Emanuele Busnelli	Lamborghini Huracán GT3	M	12	+1 Lap
36	GT3	46	(Italy) Ebimotors	(Italy) Fabio Babini (Italy) Emanuele Busnelli	Lamborghini 5.2 L V10	M	12	+1 Lap
37	GT3	95	(Switzerland) Spirit of Race	(Italy) Maurizio Mediani (Switzerland) Christoph Ulrich	Ferrari 458 Italia GT3	M	11	+2 Laps
37	GT3	95	(Switzerland) Spirit of Race	(Italy) Maurizio Mediani (Switzerland) Christoph Ulrich	Ferrari F136 4.5 L V8	M	11	+2 Laps
38	GT3	75	(United Kingdom) Optimum Racing	(United Kingdom) Flick Haigh (United Kingdom) Joe Osborne	Audi R8 LMS	M	11	+2 Laps
38	GT3	75	(United Kingdom) Optimum Racing	(United Kingdom) Flick Haigh (United Kingdom) Joe Osborne	Audi 5.2 L V10	M	11	+2 Laps
39	LMP3	87	(United Kingdom) RLR MSport	(Denmark) Morten Dons (Canada) John Farano	Ligier JS P3	M	7	Did not finish
39	LMP3	87	(United Kingdom) RLR MSport	(Denmark) Morten Dons (Canada) John Farano	Nissan VK50VE 5.0L V8	M	7	Did not finish
40	LMP3	10	(France) Duqueine Engineering	(Switzerland) Antonin Borga (Switzerland) Lucas Borga	Ligier JS P3	M	6	Did not finish
40	LMP3	10	(France) Duqueine Engineering	(Switzerland) Antonin Borga (Switzerland) Lucas Borga	Nissan VK50VE 5.0L V8	M	6	Did not finish
41	LMP3	14	(United Kingdom) RLR MSport	(United Kingdom) Alex Kapadia (United Kingdom) Martin Rich	Ligier JS P3	M	5	Did not finish
41	LMP3	14	(United Kingdom) RLR MSport	(United Kingdom) Alex Kapadia (United Kingdom) Martin Rich	Nissan VK50VE 5.0L V8	M	5	Did not finish
42	LMP3	33	(Spain) BE Motorsport	(Spain) Javier Ibrán (Netherlands) Dirk Waaijenberg	Ligier JS P3	M	5	Did not finish
42	LMP3	33	(Spain) BE Motorsport	(Spain) Javier Ibrán (Netherlands) Dirk Waaijenberg	Nissan VK50VE 5.0L V8	M	5	Did not finish
43	LMP3	55	(Switzerland) Spirit of Race	(Germany) Claudio Sdanewitsch (Italy) Michele Rugolo	Ligier JS P3	M	3	Did not finish
43	LMP3	55	(Switzerland) Spirit of Race	(Germany) Claudio Sdanewitsch (Italy) Michele Rugolo	Nissan VK50VE 5.0L V8	M	3	Did not finish
44	GT3	20	(United Kingdom) Gulf Racing UK	(United Kingdom) Andrew Baker (United Kingdom) Ben Barker	Porsche 911 GT3 R	M	3	Did not finish
44	GT3	20	(United Kingdom) Gulf Racing UK	(United Kingdom) Andrew Baker (United Kingdom) Ben Barker	Porsche 4.0 L Flat-6	M	3	Did not finish
45	LMP3	85	(United States) EuroInternational	(United States) Mark Kvamme (Venezuela) Alex Popow	Ligier JS P3	M	0	Did not finish
45	LMP3	85	(United States) EuroInternational	(United States) Mark Kvamme (Venezuela) Alex Popow	Nissan VK50VE 5.0L V8	M	0	Did not finish
46	LMP3	86	(United States) EuroInternational	(Australia) Ricky Capo (Italy) Andrea Dromedari	Ligier JS P3	M	0	Did not finish
46	LMP3	86	(United States) EuroInternational	(Australia) Ricky Capo (Italy) Andrea Dromedari	Nissan VK50VE 5.0L V8	M	0	Did not finish
47	LMP3	66	(France) Graff	(Australia) Scott Andrews (Australia) John Corbett	Ligier JS P3	M	0	Did not finish
47	LMP3	66	(France) Graff	(Australia) Scott Andrews (Australia) John Corbett	Nissan VK50VE 5.0L V8	M	0	Did not finish
48	GT3	76	(France) IMSA Performance	(France) Thierry Cornac (France) Raymond Narac	Porsche 911 GT3 R	M	13	Disqualified
48	GT3	76	(France) IMSA Performance	(France) Thierry Cornac (France) Raymond Narac	Porsche 4.0 L Flat-6	M	13	Disqualified
49	LMP3	4	(France) Cool Racing by GPC	(Switzerland) Alexandre Coigny (Switzerland) Gino Forgione	Ligier JS P3	M	0	Did not start
49	LMP3	4	(France) Cool Racing by GPC	(Switzerland) Alexandre Coigny (Switzerland) Gino Forgione	Nissan VK50VE 5.0L V8	M	0	Did not start

== Championship standings after the race ==
- Note: Only the top five positions are included for the Drivers' and Teams' Championship standings.

LMP3 Drivers' Championship standings
Pos.	+/–	Driver	Points
1	1	(Belgium) Jean Glorieux (Spain) Alexander Toril	36
2	1	(United Kingdom) Colin Noble (United Kingdom) Anthony Wells	26
3	10	(United States) John Falb (United States) Sean Rayhall	24
4	1	(Germany) Claudio Sdanewitsch	15.5
5	2	(Italy) Maurizio Mediani	15

LMP3 Teams' Championship standings
Pos.	+/–	No.	Constructor	Points
1	1	3	(Luxembourg) DKR Engineering	36
2	1	79	(United Kingdom) Nielsen Racing	26
3	10	2	(United States) United Autosports	24
4	1	55	(Switzerland) Spirit of Race	15.5
5		98	(Belgium) Motorsport 98	15

GT3 Drivers' Championship standings
Pos.	+/–	Driver	Points
1	5	(Oman) Ahmad Al Harthy (United Kingdom) Tom Jackson	31
2	1	(United Kingdom) Phil Keen (United Kingdom) Lee Mowle	29.5
3	1	(France) Steeve Hiesse (France) Cédric Mézard	24
4	1	(Italy) Fabio Babini (Italy) Emanuele Busnelli	23.5
5	3	(United Kingdom) Flick Haigh (United Kingdom) Joe Osborne	19.5

GT3 Teams' Championship standings
Pos.	+/–	No.	Constructor	Points
1	5	97	(United Kingdom) TF Sport	31
2	1	7	(United Kingdom) Lee Mowle	29.5
3	1	8	(Austria) SVC Sport Management	24
4	1	46	(Italy) Ebimotors	23.5
5	3	75	(United Kingdom) Optimum Racing	19.5
