= 2017 Le Mans Cup =

The 2017 Le Mans Cup, known as the 2017 Michelin Le Mans Cup under sponsorship, was the second season of the Le Mans Cup. It began on 13 May at the Autodromo Nazionale Monza and finished on 21 October at the Algarve International Circuit. The series was open to Le Mans Prototypes in the LMP3 class, and grand tourer sports cars in the GT3 class.

== Calendar ==
All races supported the 2017 European Le Mans Series except the Le Mans round, which was part of the 24 Hours of Le Mans weekend. On 4 May, the ACO revealed that 45 entries would take part in the Road To Le Mans for 2017, up from 42 the previous year.

Round	Circuit	Location	Race length	Date
1	(Italy) Autodromo Nazionale Monza	Monza, Italy	2 hours	13 May
2	(France) Circuit de la Sarthe	Le Mans, France	55 minutes	15 June
2	(France) Circuit de la Sarthe	Le Mans, France	55 minutes	17 June
3	(Austria) Red Bull Ring	Spielberg, Austria	2 hours	22 July
4	(France) Circuit Paul Ricard	Le Castellet, France	2 hours	26 August
5	(Belgium) Circuit de Spa-Francorchamps	Spa, Belgium	2 hours	23 September
6	(Portugal) Algarve International Circuit	Portimão, Portugal	2 hours	21 October

== Entry list ==
=== LMP3 ===
Team	Car	No.	Drivers	Rounds
(United States) United Autosports	Ligier JS P3	2	(United States) John Falb	2
(United States) United Autosports	Ligier JS P3	2	(United States) Sean Rayhall	2
(United States) United Autosports	Ligier JS P3	22	(United Kingdom) Matthew Bell	All
(United States) United Autosports	Ligier JS P3	22	(United States) Jim McGuire	All
(United States) United Autosports	Ligier JS P3	23	(United Kingdom) Richard Meins	All
(United States) United Autosports	Ligier JS P3	23	(United Kingdom) Shaun Lynn	1–3, 5
(United States) United Autosports	Ligier JS P3	23	(United Kingdom) Andrew Bentley	4, 6
(Luxembourg) DKR Engineering	Norma M30	3	(Belgium) Jean Glorieux	All
(Luxembourg) DKR Engineering	Norma M30	3	(Spain) Alexander Toril	All
(Luxembourg) DKR Engineering	Norma M30	6	(Hong Kong) Edgar Lau	2
(Luxembourg) DKR Engineering	Norma M30	6	(France) Jacques Wolf	2
(Luxembourg) DKR Engineering	ADESS-03	91	(France) Sylvain Boulay	2
(Luxembourg) DKR Engineering	ADESS-03	91	(Japan) Yojiro Terada	2
(France) Cool Racing by GPC	Ligier JS P3	4	(Switzerland) Alexandre Coigny	2–6
(France) Cool Racing by GPC	Ligier JS P3	4	(Switzerland) Gino Forgione	2
(France) Cool Racing by GPC	Ligier JS P3	4	(Switzerland) Iradj Alexander	3–5
(France) Cool Racing by GPC	Ligier JS P3	4	(Switzerland) Antonin Borga	6
(France) Duqueine Engineering	Ligier JS P3	9	(United States) Joël Janco	All
(France) Duqueine Engineering	Ligier JS P3	9	(United States) Gerry Kraut	1–2
(France) Duqueine Engineering	Ligier JS P3	9	(Australia) Scott Andrews	3
(France) Duqueine Engineering	Ligier JS P3	9	(United States) Kenton Koch	4–5
(France) Duqueine Engineering	Ligier JS P3	9	(United States) Jonatan Jorge	6
(France) Duqueine Engineering	Ligier JS P3	10	(Switzerland) Antonin Borga	2
(France) Duqueine Engineering	Ligier JS P3	10	(Switzerland) Lucas Borga	2
(France) Duqueine Engineering	Ligier JS P3	11	(Switzerland) Lucas Légeret	2
(France) Duqueine Engineering	Ligier JS P3	11	(France) Nicolas Melin	2
(Austria) SVC Sport Management	Ligier JS P3	12	(Italy) Marco Cencetti	2–3
(Austria) SVC Sport Management	Ligier JS P3	12	(Italy) Marcello Marateotto	2–3
(United Kingdom) RLR MSport	Ligier JS P3	14	(United Kingdom) Alex Kapadia	All
(United Kingdom) RLR MSport	Ligier JS P3	14	(United Kingdom) Ross Warburton	1, 3–6
(United Kingdom) RLR MSport	Ligier JS P3	14	(United Kingdom) Martin Rich	2
(United Kingdom) RLR MSport	Ligier JS P3	87	(Denmark) Morten Dons	2
(United Kingdom) RLR MSport	Ligier JS P3	87	(Canada) John Farano	2
(Spain) By Speed Factory	Ligier JS P3	15	(Netherlands) Ate de Jong	2
(Spain) By Speed Factory	Ligier JS P3	15	(South Korea) Tacksung Kim	2
(France) M.Racing - YMR	Ligier JS P3	18	(France) Alexandre Cougnaud	2
(France) M.Racing - YMR	Ligier JS P3	18	(France) Romano Ricci	2
(France) M.Racing - YMR	Ligier JS P3	53	(France) Natan Bihel	All
(France) M.Racing - YMR	Ligier JS P3	53	(France) Laurent Millara	All
(France) M.Racing - YMR	Norma M30	19	(France) Erwin Creed	2
(France) M.Racing - YMR	Norma M30	19	(France) Yann Ehrlacher	2
(Spain) BE Motorsport	Ligier JS P3	33	(Spain) Javier Ibrán	1–5
(Spain) BE Motorsport	Ligier JS P3	33	(Netherlands) Mathijs Bakker	1, 3–5
(Spain) BE Motorsport	Ligier JS P3	33	(Netherlands) Dirk Waaijenberg	2
(France) Graff	Ligier JS P3	39	(Australia) Scott Andrews	6
(France) Graff	Ligier JS P3	39	(France) Eric Trouillet	6
(France) Graff	Ligier JS P3	40	(United Kingdom) Richard Bradley	5
(France) Graff	Ligier JS P3	40	(Hong Kong) William Lok	5
(France) Graff	Ligier JS P3	65	(France) Émilien Carde	All
(France) Graff	Ligier JS P3	65	(France) Adrien Chila	All
(France) Graff	Ligier JS P3	66	(Australia) Scott Andrews	2
(France) Graff	Ligier JS P3	66	(Australia) John Corbett	2
(France) Graff	Ligier JS P3	72	(France) Philippe Cimadomo	2
(France) Graff	Ligier JS P3	72	(France) Thomas Dagoneau	2
(France) Graff	Ligier JS P3	89	(Australia) Greg Taylor	2
(France) Graff	Ligier JS P3	89	(United Kingdom) James Winslow	2
(Denmark) KEO Racing	Ligier JS P3	43	(Australia) Scott Andrews	1
(Denmark) KEO Racing	Ligier JS P3	43	(Japan) Yoshiharu Mori	1
(Spain) SPV MotorSport	Ligier JS P3	44	(Spain) Álvaro Fontes	1–3
(Spain) SPV MotorSport	Ligier JS P3	44	(Denmark) Kim Rødkjær	1
(Spain) SPV MotorSport	Ligier JS P3	44	(United Kingdom) Andrew Cummings	2–3
(Netherlands) Kox Racing	Ligier JS P3	48	(Netherlands) Peter Kox	1–2, 4
(Netherlands) Kox Racing	Ligier JS P3	48	(Netherlands) Nico Pronk	1–2, 4
(Hong Kong) Win Motorsport	Ligier JS P3	49	(United Kingdom) Richard Bradley	2
(Hong Kong) Win Motorsport	Ligier JS P3	49	(Hong Kong) William Lok	2
(Switzerland) Spirit of Race	Ligier JS P3	55	(Germany) Claudio Sdanewitsch	All
(Switzerland) Spirit of Race	Ligier JS P3	55	(Italy) Maurizio Mediani	1
(Switzerland) Spirit of Race	Ligier JS P3	55	(Italy) Michele Rugolo	2–6
(United Kingdom) Nielsen Racing	Ligier JS P3	79	(United Kingdom) Colin Noble	All
(United Kingdom) Nielsen Racing	Ligier JS P3	79	(United Kingdom) Anthony Wells	All
(United States) Eurointernational	Ligier JS P3	85	(United States) Mark Kvamme	2
(United States) Eurointernational	Ligier JS P3	85	(Venezuela) Alex Popow	2
(United States) Eurointernational	Ligier JS P3	86	(Australia) Ricky Capo	2
(United States) Eurointernational	Ligier JS P3	86	(Italy) Andrea Dromedari	2
(Austria) AT Racing	Ligier JS P3	90	(Belarus) Alexander Talkanitsa, Jr.	2
(Austria) AT Racing	Ligier JS P3	90	(Belarus) Alexander Talkanitsa, Sr.	2
(Japan) TKS	Ginetta-Juno LMP3	92	(Japan) Shinyo Sano	2
(Japan) TKS	Ginetta-Juno LMP3	92	(Japan) Takuya Shirasaka	2
(Belgium) Motorsport 98	Ligier JS P3	98	(Belgium) Eric De Doncker	All
(Belgium) Motorsport 98	Ligier JS P3	98	(United Kingdom) Andy Meyrick	All
(France) N'Race	Ligier JS P3	99	(France) Alain Costa	All
(France) N'Race	Ligier JS P3	99	(France) Jordan Perroy	1–2, 5
(France) N'Race	Ligier JS P3	99	(France) Thomas Accary	3
(France) N'Race	Ligier JS P3	99	(France) Gaëtan Paletou	4
(France) N'Race	Ligier JS P3	99	(France) Stéphane Tribaudini	6

=== GT3 ===
Team	Car	No.	Drivers	Rounds
(United Kingdom) Ram Racing	Mercedes-AMG GT3	5	(United Kingdom) Tom Onslow-Cole	All
(United Kingdom) Ram Racing	Mercedes-AMG GT3	5	(Netherlands) Remon Leonard Vos	All
(United Kingdom) Lee Mowle	Mercedes-AMG GT3	7	(United Kingdom) Lee Mowle	All
(United Kingdom) Lee Mowle	Mercedes-AMG GT3	7	(United Kingdom) Phil Keen	1–4, 6
(United Kingdom) Lee Mowle	Mercedes-AMG GT3	7	(Austria) Dominik Baumann	5
(Austria) SVC Sport Management	Lamborghini Huracán GT3	8	(France) Steeve Hiesse	All
(Austria) SVC Sport Management	Lamborghini Huracán GT3	8	(France) Cédric Mézard	All
(United Kingdom) Gulf Racing UK	Porsche 911 GT3 R	20	(United Kingdom) Andrew Baker	2, 5–6
(United Kingdom) Gulf Racing UK	Porsche 911 GT3 R	20	(United Kingdom) Ben Barker	2, 5–6
(United Kingdom) Garage 59	McLaren 650S GT3	24	(United Kingdom) Michael Benham	2
(United Kingdom) Garage 59	McLaren 650S GT3	24	(United Kingdom) Duncan Tappy	2
(United Kingdom) Garage 59	McLaren 650S GT3	88	(United Kingdom) Chris Goodwin	2
(United Kingdom) Garage 59	McLaren 650S GT3	88	(Sweden) Alexander West	2
(Belgium) Delahaye Racing Team	Porsche 911 GT3 R	28	(France) Pierre-Étienne Bordet	2
(Belgium) Delahaye Racing Team	Porsche 911 GT3 R	28	(France) Alexandre Viron	2
(Italy) Ebimotors	Lamborghini Huracán GT3	46	(Italy) Fabio Babini	All
(Italy) Ebimotors	Lamborghini Huracán GT3	46	(Italy) Emanuele Busnelli	All
(France) Larbre Compétition	Mercedes-Benz SLS AMG GT3	50	(France) Franck Labescat	2
(France) Larbre Compétition	Mercedes-Benz SLS AMG GT3	50	(France) Christian Philippon	2
(United Kingdom) Optimum Racing	Audi R8 LMS	75	(United Kingdom) Flick Haigh	1–4
(United Kingdom) Optimum Racing	Audi R8 LMS	75	(United Kingdom) Joe Osborne	1–4
(France) IMSA Performance	Porsche 911 GT3 R	76	(France) Thierry Cornac	2
(France) IMSA Performance	Porsche 911 GT3 R	76	(France) Raymond Narac	2
(France) IMSA Performance	Porsche 911 GT3 R	96	(France) Michel Ettouati	2
(France) IMSA Performance	Porsche 911 GT3 R	96	(France) Franck Racinet	2
(Switzerland) Kessel Racing	Ferrari 458 Italia GT3	93	(France) Deborah Mayer	2
(Switzerland) Kessel Racing	Ferrari 458 Italia GT3	93	(Italy) Claudio Schiavoni	2
(Switzerland) Kessel Racing	Ferrari 488 GT3	93	(Italy) Andrea Piccini	6
(Switzerland) Kessel Racing	Ferrari 488 GT3	93	(Italy) Claudio Schiavoni	6
(Switzerland) Spirit of Race	Ferrari 488 GT3	94	(Netherlands) Martin Lanting	2
(Switzerland) Spirit of Race	Ferrari 488 GT3	94	(Belgium) Patrick Van Glabeke	2
(Switzerland) Spirit of Race	Ferrari 458 Italia GT3	95	(Italy) Maurizio Mediani	2–3
(Switzerland) Spirit of Race	Ferrari 458 Italia GT3	95	(Switzerland) Christoph Ulrich	2–3
(United Kingdom) TF Sport	Aston Martin V12 Vantage GT3	97	(Oman) Ahmad Al Harthy	2
(United Kingdom) TF Sport	Aston Martin V12 Vantage GT3	97	(United Kingdom) Tom Jackson	2

== Race results ==
Bold indicates overall winner.

Rnd.		Circuit	LMP3 Winning Team	GT3 Winning Team
Rnd.		Circuit	LMP3 Winning Drivers	GT3 Winning Drivers
1		(Italy) Monza	**(United Kingdom) No. 79 Nielsen Racing**	(United Kingdom) No. 7 Lee Mowle
1		(Italy) Monza	**(United Kingdom) Colin Noble** **(United Kingdom) Anthony Wells**	(United Kingdom) Phil Keen (United Kingdom) Lee Mowle
2	R1	(France) Le Mans (report)	**(United States) No. 2 United Autosports**	(United Kingdom) No. 97 TF Sport
2	R1	(France) Le Mans (report)	**(United States) Sean Rayhall** **(United States) John Falb**	(Oman) Ahmad Al Harthy (United Kingdom) Tom Jackson
2	R2	(France) Le Mans (report)	**(Luxembourg) No. 3 DKR Engineering**	(United Kingdom) No. 97 TF Sport
2	R2	(France) Le Mans (report)	**(Belgium) Jean Glorieux** **(Spain) Alexander Toril**	(Oman) Ahmad Al Harthy (United Kingdom) Tom Jackson
3		(Austria) Red Bull Ring	**(Luxembourg) No. 3 DKR Engineering**	(Italy) No. 46 Ebimotors
3		(Austria) Red Bull Ring	**(Belgium) Jean Glorieux** **(Spain) Alexander Toril**	(Italy) Fabio Babini (Italy) Emanuele Busnelli
4		(France) Paul Ricard	**(Luxembourg) No. 3 DKR Engineering**	(Italy) No. 46 Ebimotors
4		(France) Paul Ricard	**(Belgium) Jean Glorieux** **(Spain) Alexander Toril**	(Italy) Fabio Babini (Italy) Emanuele Busnelli
5		**(Belgium)** Spa	**(Luxembourg) No. 3 DKR Engineering**	(United Kingdom) No. 7 Lee Mowle
5		**(Belgium)** Spa	**(Belgium) Jean Glorieux** **(Spain) Alexander Toril**	(Austria) Dominik Baumann (United Kingdom) Lee Mowle
6		(Portugal) Portimão	**(Belgium) No. 98 Motorsport 98**	(United Kingdom) No. 20 Gulf Racing UK
6		(Portugal) Portimão	**(Belgium) Eric De Doncker** **(United Kingdom) Andy Meyrick**	(United Kingdom) Andrew Baker (United Kingdom) Ben Barker

== Standings ==
Points are awarded according to the following structure (except Le Mans):

Position	**1st**	**2nd**	**3rd**	**4th**	**5th**	**6th**	**7th**	**8th**	**9th**	**10th**	**Other**	**Pole**
Points	25	18	15	12	10	8	6	4	2	1	0.5	1

For Le Mans:

Position	**1st**	**2nd**	**3rd**	**4th**	**5th**	**6th**	**7th**	**8th**	**9th**	**10th**	**Other**	**Pole**
Points	15	9	7	6	5	4	3	2	1	0.5	0.5	1

=== LMP3 Driver's championships (top-5) ===
Pos.	Driver	Team	MNZ (Italy)	LM1 (France)	LM2 (France)	RBR (Austria)	LEC (France)	SPA (Belgium)	POR (Portugal)	Total
1	(Spain) Alexander Toril	(Luxembourg) DKR Engineering	**2**	**Ret**	**1**	1	**1**	**1**	**DSQ**	114
1	(Belgium) Jean Glorieux	(Luxembourg) DKR Engineering	**2**	**Ret**	**1**	1	**1**	**1**	**DSQ**	114
2	(United Kingdom) Anthony Wells	(United Kingdom) Nielsen Racing	1	12	22	2	2	2	5	90
2	(United Kingdom) Colin Noble	(United Kingdom) Nielsen Racing	1	12	22	2	2	2	5	90
3	(United Kingdom) Andy Meyrick	(Belgium) Motorsport 98	5	6	9	4	Ret	3	1	67
3	(Belgium) Eric De Doncker	(Belgium) Motorsport 98	5	6	9	4	Ret	3	1	67
4	(France) Adrien Chila	(France) Graff	4	13	8	3	3	5	6	62.5
4	(France) Émilien Carde	(France) Graff	4	13	8	3	3	5	6	62.5
5	(Germany) Claudio Sdanewitsch	(Switzerland) Spirit of Race	3	11	Ret	7	5	4	2	61.5

Key
Colour	Result
Gold	Race winner
Silver	2nd place
Bronze	3rd place
Green	Points finish
Blue	Non-points finish
Blue	Non-classified finish (NC)
Purple	Did not finish (Ret)
Black	Disqualified (DSQ)
Black	Excluded (EX)
White	Did not start (DNS)
White	Race cancelled (C)
White	Withdrew (WD)
Blank	Did not participate

**Bold** – Pole

=== GT3 Driver's championships (top-5) ===
Pos.	Driver	Team	MNZ (Italy)	LM1 (France)	LM2 (France)	RBR (Austria)	LEC (France)	SPA (Belgium)	POR (Portugal)	Total
1	(Italy) Emanuele Busnelli	(Italy) Ebimotors	**3**	3	12	**1**	**1**	**3**	**4**	104.5
1	(Italy) Fabio Babini	(Italy) Ebimotors	**3**	3	12	**1**	**1**	**3**	**4**	104.5
2	(United Kingdom) Lee Mowle	(United Kingdom) Lee Mowle	1	13	6	4	3	1	3	102.5
3	(United Kingdom) Phil Keen	(United Kingdom) AmDTuning	1	13	6	4	3		3	77.5
4	(France) Cédric Mézard	(Austria) SVC Sport Management	4	5	3	5	4	4	6	66
4	(France) Steeve Hiesse	(Austria) SVC Sport Management	4	5	3	5	4	4	6	66
5	(United Kingdom) Flick Haigh	(United Kingdom) Optimum Racing	2	9	13	3	3			49.5
5	(United Kingdom) Joe Osborne	(United Kingdom) Optimum Racing	2	9	13	3	3			49.5

Key
Colour	Result
Gold	Race winner
Silver	2nd place
Bronze	3rd place
Green	Points finish
Blue	Non-points finish
Blue	Non-classified finish (NC)
Purple	Did not finish (Ret)
Black	Disqualified (DSQ)
Black	Excluded (EX)
White	Did not start (DNS)
White	Race cancelled (C)
White	Withdrew (WD)
Blank	Did not participate

**Bold** – Pole

=== LMP3 Team's championships (top-5) ===
Pos.	Team	Car	MNZ (Italy)	LM1 (France)	LM2 (France)	RBR (Austria)	LEC (France)	SPA (Belgium)	POR (Portugal)	Total
1	(Luxembourg) #3 DKR Engineering	Norma M30	**2**	**Ret**	**1**	1	**1**	**1**	**DSQ**	114
2	(United Kingdom) #79 Nielsen Racing	Ligier JS P3	1	12	22	2	2	2	5	90
3	(Belgium) #98 Motorsport 98	Ligier JS P3	5	6	9	4	Ret	3	1	67
4	(France) #65 Graff	Ligier JS P3	4	13	8	3	3	5	6	62.5
5	(Switzerland) #55 Spirit of Race	Ligier JS P3	3	11	Ret	7	5	4	2	61.5

Key
Colour	Result
Gold	Race winner
Silver	2nd place
Bronze	3rd place
Green	Points finish
Blue	Non-points finish
Blue	Non-classified finish (NC)
Purple	Did not finish (Ret)
Black	Disqualified (DSQ)
Black	Excluded (EX)
White	Did not start (DNS)
White	Race cancelled (C)
White	Withdrew (WD)
Blank	Did not participate

**Bold** – Pole

=== GT3 Team's championships (top-5) ===
Pos.	Team	Car	MNZ (Italy)	LM1 (France)	LM2 (France)	RBR (Austria)	LEC (France)	SPA (Belgium)	POR (Portugal)	Total
1	(Italy) #46 Ebimotors	Lamborghini Huracán GT3	**3**	3	12	**1**	**1**	**3**	**4**	104.5
2	(United Kingdom) #7 Lee Mowle	Mercedes-AMG GT3	1	13	6	4	3	1	3	102.5
3	(Austria) #8 SVC Sport Management	Lamborghini Huracán GT3	4	5	3	5	4	4	6	66
4	(United Kingdom) #75 Optimum Racing	Audi R8 LMS	2	9	13	3	3			49.5
5	(United Kingdom) #20 Gulf Racing UK	Porsche 911 GT3 R		**13**	Ret			2	1	44.5

Key
Colour	Result
Gold	Race winner
Silver	2nd place
Bronze	3rd place
Green	Points finish
Blue	Non-points finish
Blue	Non-classified finish (NC)
Purple	Did not finish (Ret)
Black	Disqualified (DSQ)
Black	Excluded (EX)
White	Did not start (DNS)
White	Race cancelled (C)
White	Withdrew (WD)
Blank	Did not participate

**Bold** – Pole
