= 2016 Asian Le Mans Sprint Cup =

Seasons
- ← none 2017 →

The 2016 Asian Le Mans Sprint Cup was the first season of the Automobile Club de l'Ouest's Asian Le Mans Sprint Cup. The three event season began on 27 May and ended on 4 September, all at Sepang International Circuit in Selangor, Malaysia.

== Calendar ==
Round	Circuit	Date
1	Sepang International Circuit, Selangor, Malaysia	27–29 May
2	Sepang International Circuit, Selangor, Malaysia	27–29 May
3	Sepang International Circuit, Selangor, Malaysia	6–8 August
4	Sepang International Circuit, Selangor, Malaysia	6–8 August
5	Sepang International Circuit, Selangor, Malaysia	2–4 September
6	Sepang International Circuit, Selangor, Malaysia	2–4 September

== Entry list ==
=== LMP3 ===
All cars in the LMP3 class use the Nissan VK50VE 5.0 L V8 engine.

Entrant	Car	No.	Drivers	Rounds
(China) DC Racing	Ligier JS P3	1	(United Kingdom) James Winslow	All
(China) DC Racing	Ligier JS P3	1	(Australia) Dean Koutsoumidis	1–2
(China) DC Racing	Ligier JS P3	1	(Australia) Neale Muston	5–6
(Malaysia) Nexus Infinity	ADESS-03	27	(Australia) Garnet Patterson	All
(Malaysia) Nexus Infinity	ADESS-03	27	(Malaysia) Adrian D'Silva	1–4
(Malaysia) Nexus Infinity	ADESS-03	27	(Singapore) Vignesa Moorthy	5–6
(Finland) PS Racing	ADESS-03	48	(Singapore) Ringo Chong	3–4
(Finland) PS Racing	ADESS-03	48	(Australia) Alan Yeo	3–4
(Finland) PS Racing	ADESS-03	48	(Italy) Angelo Negro	5–6
(Finland) PS Racing	ADESS-03	48	(Finland) Pekka Saarinen	5–6
(Philippines) PRT Racing	Ginetta-Juno P3-15	67	(Philippines) Ate de Jong	All
(Philippines) PRT Racing	Ginetta-Juno P3-15	67	(United Kingdom) Charlie Robertson	All
(Malaysia) Team Aylezo	Ginetta-Juno P3-15	69	(Malaysia) Zen Low	5–6
(Malaysia) Team Aylezo	Ginetta-Juno P3-15	69	(Malaysia) Weiron Tan	5–6
(Chinese Taipei) Team AAI	ADESS-03	91	(United Kingdom) Ollie Millroy	1–2
(Philippines) WinEurasia Motorsport	Ligier JS P3	94	(Australia) Aidan Read	1–4
(Philippines) WinEurasia Motorsport	Ligier JS P3	94	(Hong Kong) Matthew Solomon	1–2
(Philippines) WinEurasia Motorsport	Ligier JS P3	94	(Thailand) Tanart Sathienthirakul	3–4
(Philippines) WinEurasia Motorsport	Ligier JS P3	94	(Hong Kong) Edgar Lau	5–6
(Philippines) WinEurasia Motorsport	Ligier JS P3	94	(Japan) Yoshiharu Mori	5–6

=== CN ===
Entrant	Car	Engine	No.	Drivers	Rounds
(Finland) PS Racing	Ligier JS53	Honda K20A 2.0 L I4	67	(France) Sébastien Mailleux	1–2, 5–6
(Finland) PS Racing	Ligier JS53	Honda K20A 2.0 L I4	67	(China) Neric Wei	1–4
(Finland) PS Racing	Ligier JS53	Honda K20A 2.0 L I4	67	(Japan) Iori Kimura	3–6

=== GT Cup ===
Entrant	Car	Engine	No.	Drivers	Rounds
(Hong Kong) Team Lotus HK	Lotus Evora GTC	Lotus 2GR-FE 4.0 L V6	11	(Hong Kong) Robert Webb	1–4
(Hong Kong) Team Lotus HK	Lotus Evora GTC	Lotus 2GR-FE 4.0 L V6	11	(Colombia) Julio Acosta	3–4
(Hong Kong) Team Lotus HK	Lotus Evora GTC	Lotus 2GR-FE 4.0 L V6	28	(Malaysia) Dominic Ang	All
(Hong Kong) Team Lotus HK	Lotus Evora GTC	Lotus 2GR-FE 4.0 L V6	28	(Hong Kong) Anthony Chan	All
(Hong Kong) Team Lotus HK	Lotus Exige Cup R	Lotus 2GR-FE 3.5 L V6	98	(Hong Kong) Eric Wong	1–4
(New Zealand) Team NZ	Porsche 997 GT3 Cup	Porsche 4.0 L Flat-6	77	(Republic of Ireland) John Curran	All
(New Zealand) Team NZ	Porsche 997 GT3 Cup	Porsche 4.0 L Flat-6	77	(Australia) Graeme Dowsett	All

== Race results ==
Bold indicates overall winner.

Round	Circuit	LMP3 Winning Team	CN Winning Team	GT Cup Winning Team
Round	Circuit	LMP3 Winning Drivers	CN Winning Drivers	GT Cup Winning Drivers
1	Sepang	**(Philippines) No. 94 WinEurasia Motorsport**	(Finland) No. 68 PS Racing	(Hong Kong) No. 28 Team Lotus HK
1	Sepang	**(Australia) Aidan Read** **(Hong Kong) Matthew Solomon**	(France) Sébastien Mailleux (China) Neric Wei	(Malaysia) Dominic Ang **(Hong Kong)** Anthony Chan
2	Sepang	**(Philippines) No. 94 WinEurasia Motorsport**	(Finland) No. 68 PS Racing	**(New Zealand)** No. 77 Team NZ
2	Sepang	**(Australia) Aidan Read** **(Hong Kong) Matthew Solomon**	(France) Sébastien Mailleux (China) Neric Wei	(Republic of Ireland) John Curran **(Australia)** Graeme Dowsett
3	Sepang	**(China) No. 1 DC Racing**	(Finland) No. 68 PS Racing	**(New Zealand)** No. 77 Team NZ
3	Sepang	**(United Kingdom) James Winslow**	(Japan) Iori Kimura (China) Neric Wei	(Republic of Ireland) John Curran **(Australia)** Graeme Dowsett
4	Sepang	**(Philippines) No. 67 PRT Racing**	No finishers	**(New Zealand)** No. 77 Team NZ
4	Sepang	**(Philippines) Ate de Jong** **(United Kingdom) Charlie Robertson**	No finishers	(Republic of Ireland) John Curran **(Australia)** Graeme Dowsett
5	Sepang	**(Philippines) No. 94 WinEurasia Motorsport**	(Finland) No. 68 PS Racing	**(New Zealand)** No. 77 Team NZ
5	Sepang	**(Hong Kong) Edgar Lau** **(Japan) Yoshiharu Mori**	(Japan) Iori Kimura (France) Sébastien Mailleux	(Republic of Ireland) John Curran **(Australia)** Graeme Dowsett
6	Sepang	**(China) No. 1 DC Racing**	(Finland) No. 68 PS Racing	**(New Zealand)** No. 77 Team NZ
6	Sepang	**(Australia) Neale Muston** **(United Kingdom) James Winslow**	(Japan) Iori Kimura (France) Sébastien Mailleux	(Republic of Ireland) John Curran **(Australia)** Graeme Dowsett
