= DKR Engineering =

Luxembourgian racing team

(Luxembourg) DKR Engineering
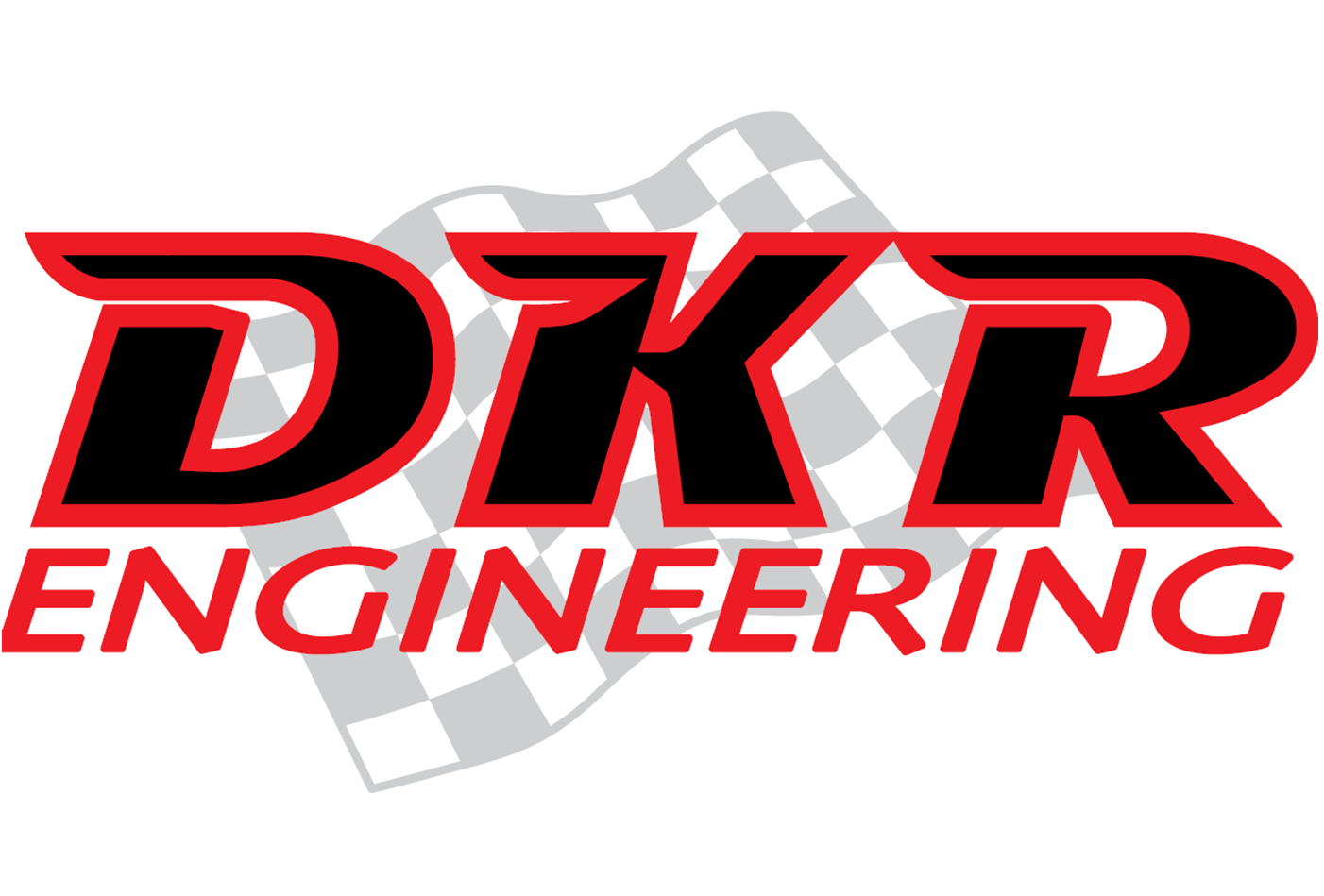
- Founded: 2004
- Base: Luxembourg
- Team principal(s): Kendy Janclaes
- Current series: European Le Mans Series; Asian Le Mans Series; Michelin Le Mans Cup; Prototype Winter Series
- Former series: GT & Prototype Challenge; FIA GT1 World Championship; FIA GT Championship; FFSA GT Championship
- Teams' Championships: 7 (2009 FFSA GT, 2017 LMC LMP3, 2018 LMC LMP3, 2019 LMC LMP3, 2020 LMC LMP3, 2021 ELMS LMP3, 2023 ALMS LMP2)
- Drivers' Championships: 7 (2009 FFSA GT, 2017 LMC LMP3, 2018 LMC LMP3, 2019 LMC LMP3, 2020 LMC LMP3, 2021 ELMS LMP3, 2023 ALMS LMP2)
- Website: https://dkr-engineering.lu/

DKR Engineering is a Belgian-owned Luxembourgish racing team and preparation firm, which competed in two seasons of the FIA GT1 World Championship and participated in the 24 Hours of Le Mans multiple times.

The company was founded in 2004 by Kendy Janclaes as a branch of the PSI Experience racing team from Belgium. After running PSI's racing programs, DKR began their own programs in 2008, running in the FFSA GT Championship with Corvettes. DKR expanded into the FIA GT Championship in 2009 where PSI had previously competed, running their own program under the Sangari Team Brazil banner and netting a single victory and sixth in the Teams' Championship. DKR's FFSA GT squad won five races in 2009 and secured the Drivers' Championship for Eric Debard.

In 2010 DKR Engineering partnered with fellow Corvette campaigner Selleslagh Racing Team to compete as a two-car team under Mad-Croc Racing banner in the FIA GT1 World Championship. After a single victory over the season, Selleslagh and DKR split and formed their own teams for the 2011 season. DKR switched from Corvette to Lamborghini mid-season.

The team are four-time LMP3 champions of the Michelin Le Mans Cup.

They have entered Le Mans multiple times. The first time in 2013 with a Lola B11/40-Judd, promoted from the reserve entry list when Gulf Racing withdrew, and in 2022, qualifying for an automatic place through their championship LMP3 win in European Le Mans Series and opting to run in the LMP2 Pro-Am subclass, with the ELMS duo of Jean Glorieux and Laurents Hörr stepping up.

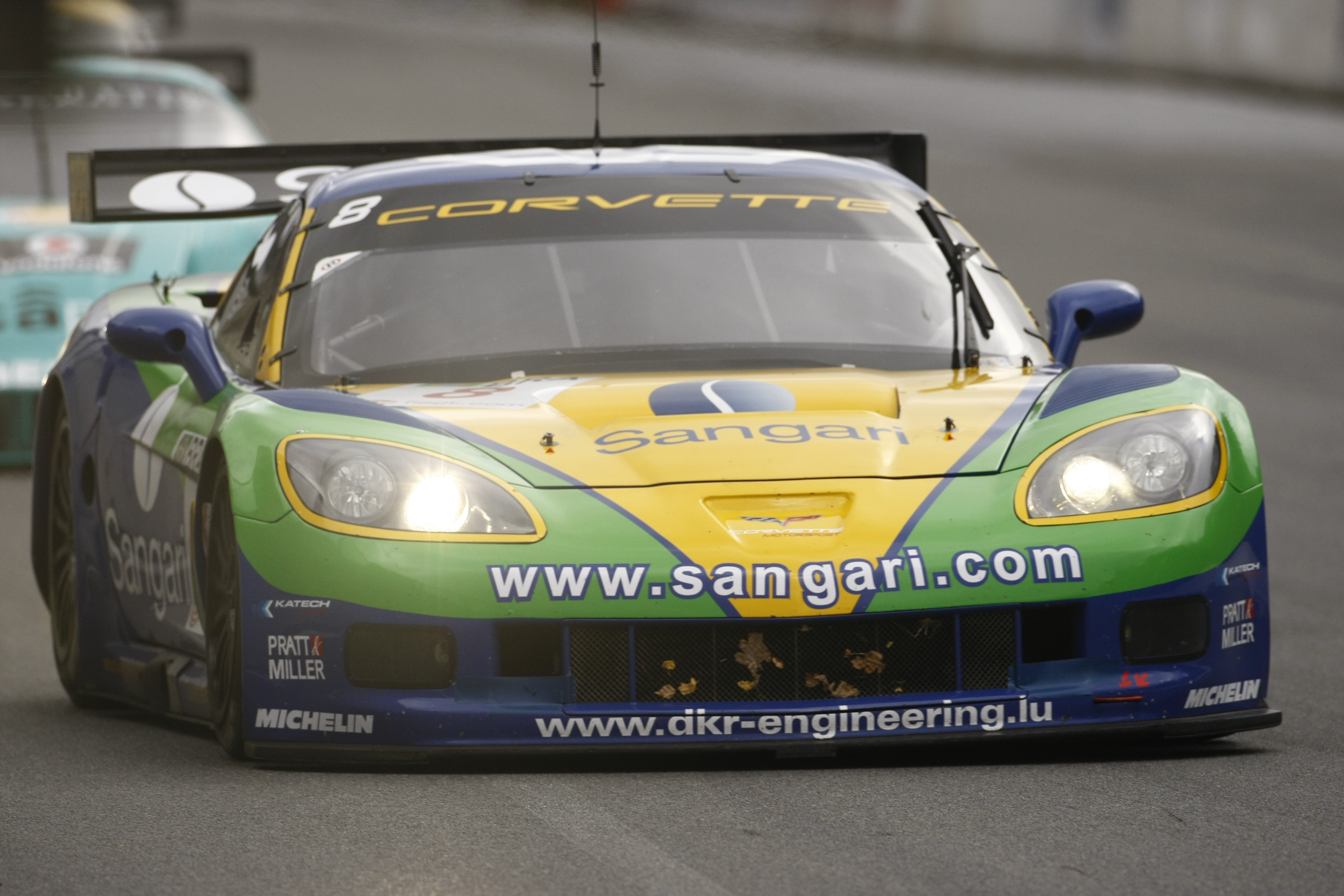
DKR-run Corvette C6.R of Sangari Team Brazil at the 2009 FIA GT Zolder 2 Hours.

The Oreca 07 of DKR Engineering at the 2022 24 Hours of Le Mans.

== Racing record ==
=== Complete 24 Hours of Le Mans results ===
Year	Entrant	No.	Car	Drivers	Class	Laps	Pos.	Class Pos.
2013	(Luxembourg) DKR Engineering	39	Lola B11/40-Judd	(France) Romain Brandela (France) Olivier Porta (France) Stéphane Raffin	LMP2	280	38th	12th
2022	(Luxembourg) DKR Engineering	3	Oreca 07-Gibson	(France) Alexandre Cougnaud (Belgium) Jean Glorieux (Germany) Laurents Hörr	LMP2 (Pro-Am)	362	22nd	3rd
2023	(Luxembourg) DKR Engineering	43	Oreca 07-Gibson	(Belgium) Maxime Martin (Belgium) Tom Van Rompuy (Belgium) Ugo de Wilde	LMP2 (Pro-Am)	311	32nd	3rd
2024	(Luxembourg) DKR Engineering	33	Oreca 07-Gibson	(Austria) René Binder (Germany) Laurents Hörr (Germany) Alexander Mattschull	LMP2 (Pro-Am)	295	21st	3rd
2026	(Luxembourg) DKR Engineering	3	Oreca 07-Gibson	(Mexico) Sebastián Álvarez (Canada) John Farano (Netherlands) Renger van der Zande	LMP2 (Pro-Am)	344	31st	9th

=== Complete European Le Mans Series results ===
Year	Entrant	Class	No	Chassis	Engine	Drivers	1	2	3	4	5	6	Pos.	Pts
2013	(Luxembourg) DKR Engineering	LMP2	39	Lola B11/40	Judd HK 3.6 L V8	(France) Romain Brandela (France) Olivier Porta (France) Stéphane Raffin (Belgium) Bernard Delhez	SIL; 6	IMO; Ret	RBR	HUN	LEC		10th	8
2013	(Luxembourg) DKR Engineering	GTC	85	BMW Z4 GT3 (Spec 2011)	BMW 4.4 L V8	(France) Thomas Accary (France) Dimitri Enjalbert (France) Matthieu Lecuyer	SIL	IMO	RBR	HUN	LEC; 6		10th	8
2018	(Luxembourg) DKR Engineering	LMP3	8	Norma M30	Nissan VK56DE 5.0L V8	(Belgium) Jean Glorieux (Spain) Alexander Toril (Spain) Miguel Toril (Sweden) Henning Enqvist (France) Fabien Lavergne (Mexico) Ricardo Sanchez (France) Marvin Klein (Switzerland) Christian Vaglio (Switzerland) Nicolas Maulini	LEC; Ret	MNZ; Ret	RBR; 14	SIL	SPA; 11	POR; 9	17th	2.75
2020	(Luxembourg) DKR Engineering	LMP3	4	Duqueine M30 - D08	Nissan VK56DE 5.6L V8	(Germany) Laurents Hörr (France) François Kirmann (Germany) Wolfgang Triller (Belgium) Jean Glorieux	LEC; 10	SPA; 6	LEC; 6	MNZ; 7	POR; 10		9th	24
2021	(Luxembourg) DKR Engineering	LMP3	4	Duqueine M30 - D08	Nissan VK56DE 5.6L V8	(Germany) Laurents Hörr (Netherlands) Alain Berg (Germany) Leonard Weiss (France) Jean-Phillipe Dayrault (France) Mathieu de Barbuat	CAT; 5	RBR; 8	LEC; 1	MNZ; 1	SPA; 1	POR; 4	1st	105
2022	(Luxembourg) DKR Engineering	LMP3	4	Duqueine M30 - D08	Nissan VK56DE 5.6L V8	(Mexico) Sebastián Álvarez (United Arab Emirates) Alexander Bukhantsov (Belgium) Tom Van Rompuy (United Kingdom) James Winslow	LEC; 9	IMO; 5	MNZ; 8	CAT; 2	SPA; 2	POR; 7	3rd	60
2023	(Luxembourg) DKR Engineering	LMP2 Pro-Am	3	Oreca 07	Gibson GK428 4.2 L V8	(Mexico) Sebastián Álvarez (France) Nathanaël Berthon (Belgium) Tom Van Rompuy	CAT; 5	LEC; 9	ARA; 8	SPA; 8	POR; 8	ALG; 6	9th	32
2024	(Luxembourg) DKR Engineering	LMP2 Pro-Am	3	Oreca 07	Gibson GK428 4.2 L V8	(Turkey) Cem Bölükbaşı (Germany) Laurents Hörr (Australia) Andres Latorre Canon	CAT; 6	LEC; 8	IMO; 5	SPA; 5	MUG; Ret	ALG; 7	8th	38

=== Complete Asian Le Mans Series results ===
Year	Entrant	Class	No	Chassis	Engine	Drivers	1	2	3	4	5	6	Pos.	Pts
2021	(Luxembourg) DKR Engineering	LMP3	63	Duqueine M30 - D08	Nissan VK56DE 5.6 L V8	(Belgium) Jean Glorieux (Germany) Laurents Hörr	DUB; Ret	DUB; 4	YMC; 5	YMC; 5			6th	32
2022	(Luxembourg) DKR Engineering	LMP3	2	Duqueine M30 - D08	Nissan VK56DE 5.6 L V8	(Mexico) Sebastián Álvarez (France) Mathieu de Barbuat (Germany) Laurents Hörr	DUB; Ret	DUB; 7	YMC; 1	YMC; 7			6th	41
2023	(Luxembourg) DKR Engineering	LMP2	3	Oreca 07	Gibson GK428 V8	(Republic of Ireland) Charlie Eastwood (Turkey) Ayhancan Güven (Turkey) Salih Yoluç	DUB; 2	DUB; 2	YMC; 3	YMC; 1			1st	76
2023	(Luxembourg) DKR Engineering	LMP3	5	Duqueine M30 - D08	Nissan VK56DE 5.6 L V8	(Germany) Valentino Catalano (Belgium) Tom Van Rompuy	DUB; 6	DUB; 1	YMC; 5	YMC; 10			4th	44
2023–24	(Luxembourg) DKR Engineering	LMP2	3	Oreca 07	Gibson GK428 V8	(Germany) Alexander Mattschull (France) Tom Dillmann (Germany) Laurents Hörr	SEP; 3	SEP; 6	DUB; 4	YMC; 3	YMC; 4		4th	62
2024–25	(Luxembourg) DKR Engineering	LMP2	3	Oreca 07	Gibson GK428 V8	(Greece) Georgios Kolovos (Netherlands) Job van Uitert (Germany) Laurents Hörr	SEP; 7	SEP; 9	DUB; 2	DUB; 9	YMC; Ret	YMC; Ret	8th	28
2025–26	(Luxembourg) DKR Engineering	LMP2	3	Oreca 07	Gibson GK428 V8	(Switzerland) Mathias Beche (Germany) Alexander Mattschull (Australia) Griffin Peebles	SEP; 11	SEP; 4	DUB; 8	DUB; 7	YMC; 4	YMC; 1	4th	59

* Season still in progress.

=== Complete Michelin Le Mans Cup results ===
Year	Entrant	Class	No	Chassis	Engine	Drivers	1	2	3	4	5	6	7	Pos.	Pts
2017	(Luxembourg) DKR Engineering	LMP3	3	Norma M30	Nissan VK56DE 5.0 L V8	(Belgium) Jean Glorieux (Spain) Alexander Toril	MNZ; 2	LMN 1 Ret	LMN 2; 1	RBR; 1	LEC; 1	SPA; 1	POR; DSQ	1st	114
2017	(Luxembourg) DKR Engineering	LMP3	6	Norma M30	Nissan VK56DE 5.0 L V8	(Hong Kong) Edgar Lau (France) Jacques Wolf	MNZ	LMN 1; 19	LMN 2; 5	RBR	LEC	SPA	POR	18th	5.5
2017	(Luxembourg) DKR Engineering	LMP3	91	ADESS-03	Nissan VK56DE 5.0 L V8	(France) Sylvain Boulay (Japan) Yojiro Terada	MNZ	LMN 1 Ret	LMN 2; 24	RBR	LEC	SPA	POR	27th	0.5
2018	(Luxembourg) DKR Engineering	LMP3	1	Norma M30	Nissan VK56DE 5.0 L V8	(Republic of Ireland) Dan Polley (United Kingdom) James Winslow	LEC	MNZ	LMN 1; 32	LMN 2; 27	RBR	SPA	POR	28th	1
2018	(Luxembourg) DKR Engineering	LMP3	3	Norma M30	Nissan VK56DE 5.0 L V8	(Netherlands) Leonard Hoogenboom (Germany) Jens Petersen	LEC; 1	MNZ; 1	LMN 1; 3	LMN 2; 4	RBR; 1	SPA; 3	POR; Ret	1st	103
2019	(Luxembourg) DKR Engineering	LMP3	3	Norma M30	Nissan VK56DE 5.0 L V8	(Germany) Laurents Hörr (France) François Kirmann	LEC; 2	MNZ; 2	LMN 1; 6	LMN 2; 1	CAT; 1	SPA; DSQ	POR; 3	1st	100
2019	(Luxembourg) DKR Engineering	LMP3	5	Norma M30	Nissan VK56DE 5.0 L V8	(Italy) Marco Cencetti (Switzerland) Marcello Marateotto (Germany) Wolfgang Triller (Germany) Kenneth Heyer	LEC; 8	MNZ; 5	LMN 1; 2	LMN 2 Ret	CAT; 8	SPA; 12	POR; 12	9th	28
2019	(Luxembourg) DKR Engineering	LMP3	29	Ligier JS P3	Nissan VK56DE 5.0 L V8	(Netherlands) Bob Herber (Netherlands) Rob Kamphues	LEC	MNZ	LMN 1; 24	LMN 2; 17	CAT	SPA	POR		
2020	(Luxembourg) DKR Engineering	LMP3	1	Duqueine M30 - D08	Nissan VK56DE 5.0 L V8	(Belgium) Ugo de Wilde (Germany) Wolfgang Triller	LEC	SPA	LEC	LMN 1; 6	LMN 2 Ret	MNZ	POR		
2020	(Luxembourg) DKR Engineering	LMP3	3	Duqueine M30 - D08	Nissan VK56DE 5.0 L V8	(Belgium) Jean Glorieux (Germany) Laurents Hörr (Germany) Wolfgang Triller	LEC; 1	SPA; 2	LEC; 4	LMN 1; 1	LMN 2; 2	MNZ; 1	POR; 3	1st	120
2021	(Luxembourg) DKR Engineering	LMP3	1	Duqueine M30 - D08	Nissan VK56DE 5.0 L V8	(Australia) Nathan Kumar (Switzerland) Marcello Marateotto	CAT	LEC	MNZ	LMN 1 Ret	LMN 2; 28	SPA	POR		
2021	(Luxembourg) DKR Engineering	LMP3	3	Duqueine M30 - D08	Nissan VK56DE 5.0 L V8	(United States) Jon Brownson (United States) Dario Cangialosi (Belgium) Kris Cools (France) Francois Kirmann (Belgium) Jean Glorieux (Germany) Laurents Hörr	CAT; 23	LEC; 15	MNZ; 5	LMN 1; 19	LMN 2 Ret	SPA; 22	POR; 16	14th	13.5
2022	(Luxembourg) DKR Engineering	LMP3	3	Duqueine M30 - D08	Nissan VK56DE 5.0 L V8	(United States) Jon Brownson (Germany) Laurents Hörr	LEC; 15	IMO; 17	LMN 1; 13	LMN 2 Ret	MNZ; 21	SPA; Ret	POR; 25	24th	1
2022	(Luxembourg) DKR Engineering	LMP3	14	Duqueine M30 - D08	Nissan VK56DE 5.0 L V8	(United Arab Emirates) Alexander Bukhantsov (United Kingdom) James Winslow	LEC; 20	IMO; 11	LMN 1; 8	LMN 2; 7	MNZ; Ret	SPA; 8	POR; 8	15th	15

=== Complete Prototype Winter Series results ===
Year	Entrant	Class	No	Chassis	Drivers	1	2	3	4	5	6	7	8	Pos.	Pts
2024	(Luxembourg) DKR Engineering	Class 3	3	Duqueine-D08	(United States) Jon Brownson (Germany) Laurents Hörr	EST1	EST2	POR1	POR2	ARA1	ARA2	CAT1	CAT2		
