= Antonin Borga =

Swiss racing driver (born 1987)

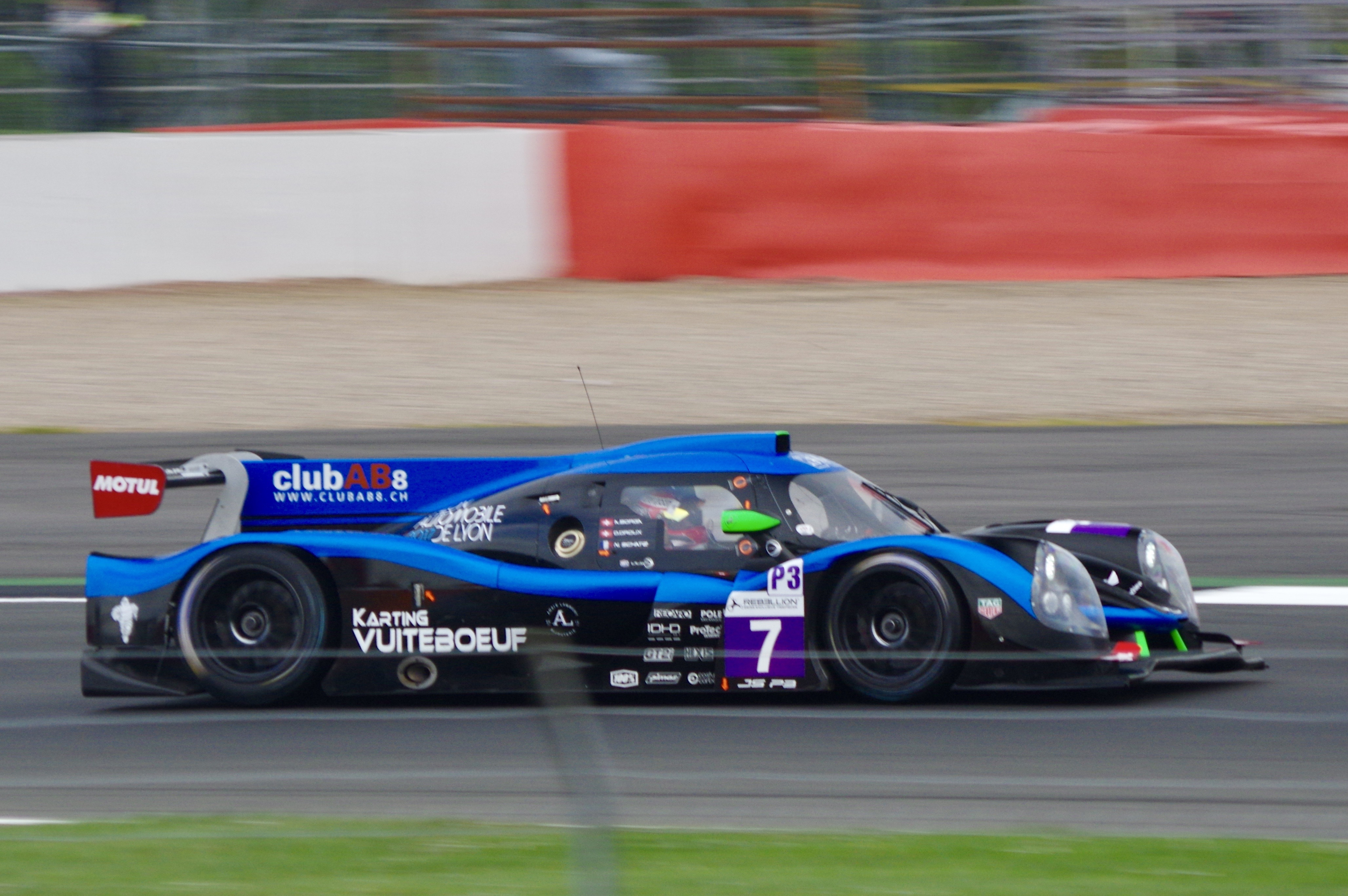
- Borga in 2017
- Nationality: (Switzerland) Swiss
- Born: 21 September 1987 (age 39) Vergeletto, Switzerland
- Categorisation: FIA Silver (until 2020, 2024–); FIA Gold (2021–2023)

Antonin Borga (born 21 September 1987) is a Swiss racing driver who last competed for AGS Events in GT World Challenge Europe Endurance Cup.

A mainstay of Cool Racing's sports car racing programme, Borga climbed the ladder from entry-level sports prototypes to LMP3 and eventually LMP2. He spent six seasons in the ELMS, and notably won on his FIA World Endurance Championship debut at Silverstone in 2019.

== Career ==
Borga made his single-seater debut in 2008, racing in LO Formula Renault 2.0 Suisse on a part-time basis for Sports Promotion. Following a three-year hiatus, Borga competed in the V de V Challenge Monoplace from 2012 to 2014, finishing runner-up in 2012 and third in 2014 before switching to touring cars in 2015.

Switching to the French Supertouring championship for 2015, Borga spent two seasons in the series where he finished third in 2015 and runner-up in 2016 for Yvan Muller Racing. Borga also made his LMP3 debut during 2016, racing in the European Le Mans Series and V de V Endurance Series for Duqueine Engineering.

Borga was retained by Duqueine Engineering for 2017, remaining with the team for a dual program in V de V Proto Endurance and European Le Mans Series. In his first full season of LMP3 competition, Borga took his maiden podium at the penultimate round of the season at Spa.

Borga switched to Cool Racing for 2018, as he competed in the LMP3 class in both the European Le Mans Series and Le Mans Cup. After finishing 18th in Le Mans Cup with a best result of fourth at Monza, Borga ended the year by finishing tenth in the ELMS standings having taken a best result of sixth in the rain-shortned race at Spa.

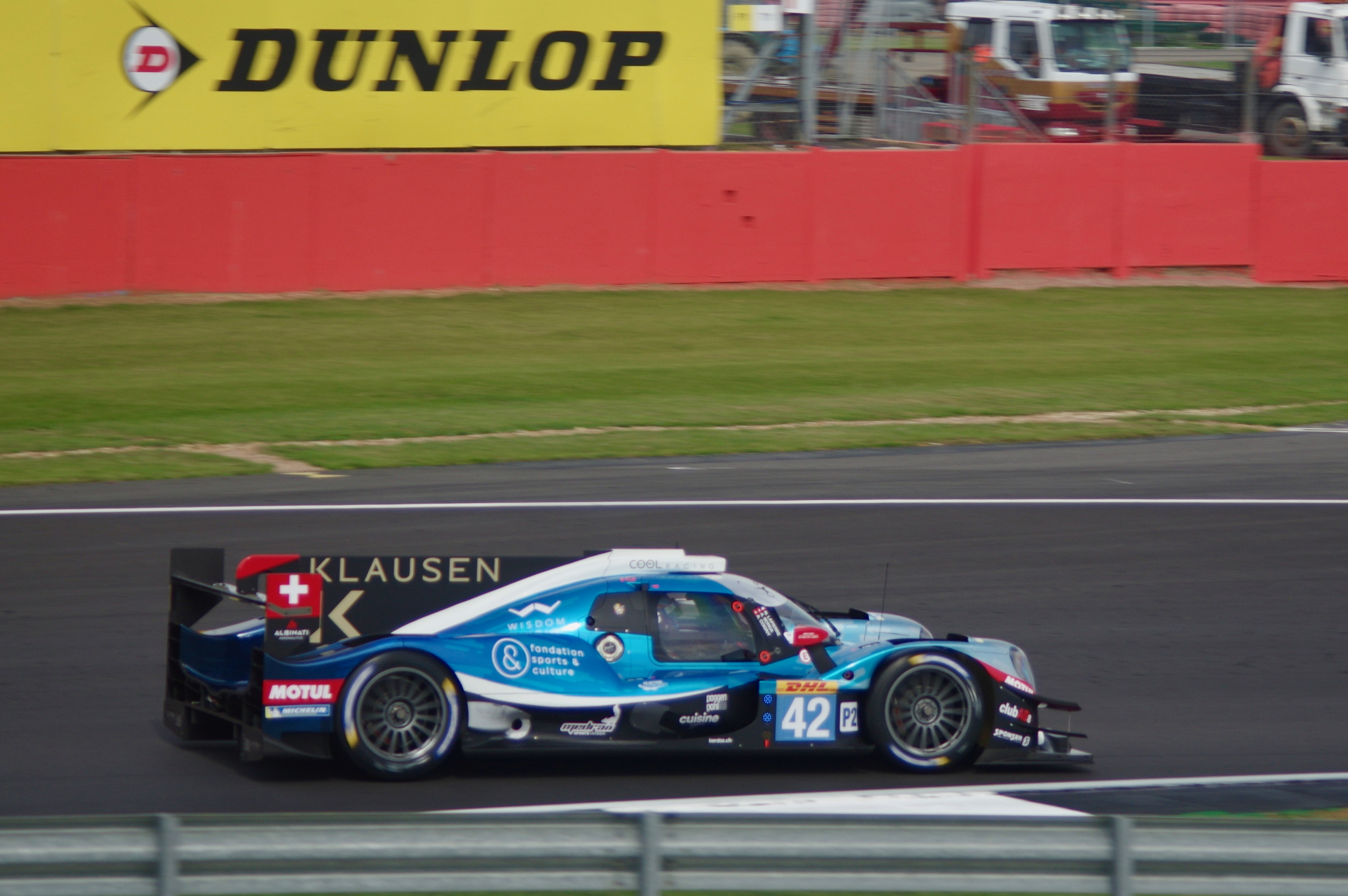
Borga at the 2019 4 Hours of Silverstone

With Cool Racing establishing an LMP2 program ahead of 2019, Borga joined Nicolas Lapierre and Alexandre Coigny for his first season in the category. The Swiss scored his maiden LMP2 podium at Barcelona by finishing third, before finishing second at Spa on his way to tenth in points. Staying with their ELMS program for the following two years, Borga took a best result of fourth twice on his way to eighth in 2020, before taking two Pro-Am podiums the following year as he finished seventh in the class points despite missing the final two rounds.

In late 2019, Borga made his FIA World Endurance Championship debut with Cool Racing in the LMP2 class alongside Lapierre and Coigny. In his only season in the series, Borga took a lone win at Silverstone, before finishing second at Spa en route to a ninth-place points finish at season's end despite missing the season-ending round in Bahrain.

In 2022, Borga switched to Lamborghini Super Trofeo Europe by joining Rexal FFF Racing Team alongside Dani Pedrosa. Taking a best result of fifth in class, Borga was 15th in the Pro-Am standings at season's end. During 2022, Borga made his debut in GT World Challenge Europe Endurance Cup with CMR at the 24 Hours of Spa.

Borga returned to GT World Challenge Europe Endurance Cup for 2023, joining AGS Events alongside Leonardo Gorini and Nico Jamin. In the four races contested, Borga scored nine points and finished 26th in the Bronze Cup.

== Personal life ==
Borga is the brother of fellow sportscar driver Lucas Borga.

== Racing record ==
=== Racing career summary ===
Season	Series	Team	Races	Wins	Poles	FLaps	Podiums	Points	Position
2008	LO Formula Renault 2.0 Suisse	Sports Promotion	2	0	0	0	0	0	NC
2009	LO Formula Renault 2.0 Suisse	Bossy Racing	4	0	0	0	0	23	18th
2012	V de V Challenge Monoplace	Bossy Racing	15	2	0	3	9	534.5	**2nd**
2013	V de V Challenge Monoplace	Equipe Palmyr	3	0	0	0	0	120	24th
2013	V de V Challenge Endurance Prototype	JD Racing Team; Equipe Palmyr	4	0	0	0	0	25	38th
2014	V de V Challenge Monoplace	Bossy Racing	17	2	0	2	14	639.5	**3rd**
2015	Championnat de France Supertourisme	Yvan Muller Racing						1102	**3rd**
2016	Championnat de France Supertourisme	Yvan Muller Racing	28	10	0	1	25	1248	**2nd**
2016	Championnat de France Prototypes	OAK Racing	2	0	0	0	1	0	NC
2016	V de V Challenge Endurance Prototype	Duqueine Engineering	2	0	1	0	1	0	NC
2016	European Le Mans Series – LMP3	Duqueine Engineering	4	0	0	0	0	2	30th
2016	Road to Le Mans – LMP3	Duqueine Engineering	1	0	0	0	0	—N/a	11th
2017	Gulf 12 Hours – GT3 Pro-Am	SPS Automotive Performance	1	0	0	0	0	—N/a	4th
2017	V de V Challenge Endurance Series – LMP3	Duqueine Engineering	7	0	1	1	1	183	6th
2017	European Le Mans Series – LMP3	Duqueine Engineering	6	0	0	1	1	37.5	8th
2017	Le Mans Cup – LMP3	Duqueine Engineering	2	0	0	0	0	0.5	41st
2017	Le Mans Cup – LMP3	Cool Racing by GPC	1	0	0	0	0	0.5	41st
2018	European Le Mans Series – LMP3	Cool Racing	5	0	0	1	0	8.5	18th
2018	Le Mans Cup – LMP3	Cool Racing	7	0	0	1	0	17.5	18th
2018	V de V Challenge Endurance Series – LMP3	Cool Racing	3	0	0	0	1	62.5	29th
2018	24H GT Series – A6-Am	SPS Automotive Performance	3	0	1	0	0	65	**3rd**
2019	European Le Mans Series – LMP2	Cool Racing	6	0	1	1	2	44.5	10th
2019–20	FIA World Endurance Championship – LMP2	Cool Racing	7	1	2	0	2	103	9th
2020	European Le Mans Series – LMP2	Cool Racing	6	0	0	0	0	28.5	8th
2021	European Le Mans Series – LMP2 Pro-Am	Cool Racing	4	0	0	0	2	54	7th
2022	Lamborghini Super Trofeo Europe – Pro-Am	Rexal FFF Racing Team	6	0	0	0	0	18	15th
2022	GT World Challenge Europe Endurance Cup – Gold	CMR	1	0	0	0	0	0	NC
2023	GT World Challenge Europe Endurance Cup – Bronze	AGS Events	4	0	0	0	0	9	26th

=== Complete European Le Mans Series results ===
Year	Entrant	Class	Chassis	Engine	1	2	3	4	5	6	Rank	Points
2016	Duqueine Engineering	LMP3	Ligier JS P3	Nissan VK50VE 5.0 L V8	SIL	IMO	RBR; 11	LEC; 13	SPA; 10	EST; Ret	30th	2
2017	Duqueine Engineering	LMP3	Ligier JS P3	Gibson GK428 4.2 L V8	SIL; 11	MNZ; 8					8th	37.5
2017	Duqueine Engineering	LMP3	Norma M30	Gibson GK428 4.2 L V8			**RBR**; 9	LEC; Ret	SPA; 2	ALG; 4	8th	37.5
2018	Cool Racing	LMP3	Ligier JS P3	Nissan VK50VE 5.0 L V8	LEC; 10	MNZ; 9	RBR; 10	SIL	SPA; 6‡	**ALG**; 13	10th	27.5
2019	Cool Racing	LMP2	Oreca 07	Gibson GK428 4.2 L V8	LEC; 7	**MNZ**; 8	CAT; 3	SIL; Ret	SPA; 2	ALG; 14	10th	44.5
2020	Cool Racing	LMP2	Oreca 07	Gibson GK428 4.2 L V8	LEC; 4	SPA; 10	LEC; 12	MNZ; 4	ALG; 9		8th	28.5
2021	Cool Racing	LMP2	Oreca 07	Gibson GK428 4.2 L V8	CAT; 10	RBR; 10	LEC; 12	MNZ; 12	SPA	ALG	28th	3
2021	Cool Racing	Pro-Am Cup	Oreca 07	Gibson GK428 4.2 L V8	3	4	3	4			7th	54

^{‡} Half points awarded as less than 75% of race distance was completed.

=== Complete Le Mans Cup results ===
(key) (Races in bold indicate pole position; results in italics indicate fastest lap)

Year	Entrant	Class	Chassis	1	2	3	4	5	6	7	Rank	Points
2017	Duqueine Engineering	LMP3	Ligier JS P3	MNZ	LMS; 1; 23	LMS; 2 Ret	RBR	LEC	SPA		41st	0.5
2017	Cool Racing by GPC	LMP3	Ligier JS P3							POR; Ret	41st	0.5
2018	Cool Racing	LMP3	Ligier JS P3	LEC; Ret	MNZ; 4	LMS; 1; 16	LMS; 2; 11	RBR; 16	SPA; Ret	ALG; 8	18th	17.5

=== Complete FIA World Endurance Championship results ===
Year	Entrant	Class	Chassis	Engine	1	2	3	4	5	6	7	8	Rank	Points
2019–20	Cool Racing	LMP2	Oreca 07	Gibson GK428 4.2 L V8	SIL; 1	FUJ; 5	**SHA**; Ret	BHR; 6	**COA**; 4	SPA; 2	LMS; 4	BHR	9th	103

=== Complete 24 Hours of Le Mans results ===
Year	Team	Co-Drivers	Car	Class	Laps	Pos.	Class Pos.
2020	(Switzerland) Cool Racing	(Switzerland) Alexandre Coigny (France) Nicolas Lapierre	Oreca 07-Gibson	LMP2	365	12th	8th

=== Complete GT World Challenge Europe results ===
==== GT World Challenge Europe Endurance Cup ====
Year	Team	Car	Class	1	2	3	4	5	6	7	Pos.	Points
2022	CMR	Bentley Continental GT3	Gold Cup	IMO	LEC	SPA; 6H; 58	SPA; 12H; Ret	SPA; 24H; Ret	HOC	CAT	NC	0
2023	AGS Events	Lamborghini Huracán GT3 Evo 2	Bronze Cup	MNZ; 35	LEC; 26	SPA; 6H; 65	SPA; 12H; 56	SPA; 24H; Ret	NÜR; 39	CAT	26th	9
