= Asian Le Mans Sprint Cup =

Former auto racing series in Asia

- Category: Sports car racing
- Region: Asia
- Inaugural season: 2016
- Folded: 2017
- Prototype classes: LMP3, Group CN
- GT classes: GT Cup
- Tyre suppliers: Michelin

The Asian Le Mans Sprint Cup was an Asian sports car racing organised by the Asian Le Mans Endurance Management Ltd, the Asian branch of the Automobile Club de l'Ouest (ACO).

== History ==
The series was announced in January 2016, with the aim to develop the Asian market. Champions of all three classes were awarded a free entry for the 2016–17 Asian Le Mans Series season, or a 15 percent discount if they were already entered. The series was contested for two seasons before it folded. A successor series, the Asian Le Mans Cup, was announced in 2026.

== Format ==
The race weekend had two practice and qualifying sessions, with two driver entries splitting the qualifying. Two, 60-minute races were held at each meeting.

== Classes ==
There were two prototype classes, one for LMP3 cars and one for Group CN. The GT Cup class was reserved for single-make cars from the Audi R8 LMS Cup, Lamborghini Super Trofeo, Ferrari Challenge, Porsche Carrera Cup, among others. Michelin was the official tyre supplier. Drivers could run either solo or in a pairing, with one FIA Bronze-rated driver mandated. The second driver could be either Bronze or Silver but Gold and Platinum-rated drivers were not allowed.

For 2017, the GT class was added, exclusively for Group GT3 cars.

== Champions ==
=== Drivers' ===
Season	LMP3	CN	GT	GT Cup
2016	(United Kingdom) James Winslow	(France) Sébastien Mailleux	—N/a	(Republic of Ireland) John Curran (New Zealand) Graeme Dowsett
2017	(Hong Kong) William Lok	Not awarded	(Hong Kong) Michael Choi	(New Zealand) Graeme Dowsett

=== Teams' ===
Season	LMP3	CN	GT	GT Cup
2016	(China) DC Racing	(Finland) PS Racing	—N/a	(New Zealand) Team NZ
2017	(Hong Kong) WIN Motorsport	Not awarded	(Malaysia) Arrows Engineering	(New Zealand) Team NZ
