= Edgar Lau =

Hong Kong racing driver

- Nationality: Hong Konger
- Born: 2 April 1991 (age 35) British Hong Kong

TCR International Series career
- Debut season: 2016
- Current team: Asia Racing Team
- Car number: 09
- Starts: 2

Previous series
- 2016 2015-16 2014 2014-15: Asian Le Mans Series Sprint Cup; Zhuhai Pan Delta Super Racing Festival; GT Academy; 25 Hours of Thunderhill

"Edgar" Lau Shek Fai (born 2 April 1991) is a Hong Kong racing driver currently competing in the TCR International Series. Having previously competed in the Asian Le Mans Series Sprint Cup and Zhuhai Pan Delta Super Racing Festival amongst others.

== Racing career ==
Lau began his career in 2014 in the 25 Hours of Thunderhill endurance race, and took part in the race two times in 2014 and 2015. Both times participating in the E3 class, winning the class in 2014. In 2015, he switched to the Zhuhai Pan Delta Super Racing Festival, taking two victories in 2015, he continued racing there in 2016 taking a single victory. He also raced in the Asian Le Mans Series Sprint Cup for 2016 season, taking a single victory on his way to finishing fifth in the championships LMP3 standings.

In November 2016, it was announced that Lau would race in the TCR International Series, driving a SEAT León TCR for Asia Racing Team.

== Racing record ==
=== Complete TCR International Series results ===
(key) (Races in bold indicate pole position) (Races in italics indicate fastest lap)

Year	Team	Car	1	2	3	4	5	6	7	8	9	10	11	12	13	14	15	16	17	18	19	20	21	22	DC	Points
2016	Asia Racing Team	SEAT León TCR	BHR; 1	BHR; 2	POR; 1	POR; 2	BEL; 1	BEL; 2	ITA; 1	ITA; 2	AUT; 1	AUT; 2	GER; 1	GER; 2	RUS; 1	RUS; 2	THA; 1	THA; 2	SIN; 1	SIN; 2	MYS; 1	MYS; 2	MAC; 1; 9	MAC; 2; 13	NC	0

^{†} Driver did not finish the race, but was classified as he completed over 90% of the race distance.
