= Road to Le Mans =

Annual French auto race

Michelin Le Mans Cup
- Venue: Circuit de la Sarthe
- First race: 2016
- First MLMC race: 2016
- Duration: 2x 55 Minutes
- Most wins (team): (Luxembourg) DKR Engineering

The Road to Le Mans is a sports car race held annually at the Circuit de la Sarthe, in Le Mans, France. It serves as a support event for the main race, the annual 24 Hours of Le Mans. The race was first run in 2016, as a one-hour event, forming part of the Michelin GT3 Le Mans Cup, in its inaugural season.

== History ==
The race was announced on 13 November 2015, a support race for LMP3 cars, competing in series sanctioned by the Automobile Club de l'Ouest, and GT3 cars competing in the Michelin GT3 Le Mans Cup. It would by the Automobile Club de l’Ouest with the collaboration of Le Mans Endurance Management (promoter of the Michelin GT3 Le Mans Cup Series). It was announced to be a non-championship race for the LMP3 cars, while all full-season entrants of the GT3 Le Mans Cup would receive automatic invitations to the race. For the inaugural race in 2016, a total of 39 cars were entered, with 22 LMP3 and 17 GT3 cars. The race was the first time that GT3 and LMP3 cars had competed on the full Circuit de la Sarthe.

In 2017, the race was announced to be returning on the Le Mans support calendar, albeit with a number of changes. The event was expanded to comprise 2x 55 minute long races, with up to 46 cars competing, instead of 42 in the previous year.

== Innovative Cars ==
In 2018, the Road to Le Mans would follow the example of the race it was supporting and allow an innovative entry on the grid.

| Year | Race | Car | Team | Image | Placement |
|---|---|---|---|---|---|
| 2019 | 1 | Ligier JS P3 | SRT41 - Frédéric Sausset | | 39th |
| 2019 | 2 | Ligier JS P3 | SRT41 - Frédéric Sausset | | 39th |
| 2022 | 1 | GreenGT H24 | H24 Racing | | DNF |
| 2022 | 2 | GreenGT H24 | H24 Racing | | 38th |

== Race winners ==
| Year | Race | Drivers | Team | Car | Drivers | Team | Car | Duration / Distance | Ref |
| Year | Race | LMP3 | | | GT3 | | | Duration / Distance | Ref |
|---|---|---|---|---|---|---|---|---|---|
| 2016 | | (France) Alexandre Cougnaud (France) Thomas Laurent | (China) DC Racing | Ligier JS P3 | (Russia) Aleksey Basov (Russia) Viktor Shaytar | (Russia) SMP Racing | Ferrari 488 GT3 | 13 laps | |
| 2017 | 1 | (United States) Sean Rayhall (United States) John Falb | (United Kingdom) United Autosports | Ligier JS P3 | (Oman) Ahmad Al Harthy (United Kingdom) Tom Jackson | (United Kingdom) TF Sport | Aston Martin V12 Vantage GT3 | 13 laps | |
| 2017 | 2 | (Spain) Alexander Toril (Belgium) Jean Glorieux | (Luxembourg) DKR Engineering | Norma M30 | (Oman) Ahmad Al Harthy (United Kingdom) Tom Jackson | (United Kingdom) TF Sport | Aston Martin V12 Vantage GT3 | 13 laps | |
| 2018 | 1 | (Denmark) Mikkel Jensen (Netherlands) Kay van Berlo | (United States) EuroInternational | Ligier JS P3 | (Italy) Piergiuseppe Perazzini (Italy) Marco Cioci | (Italy) AF Corse | Ferrari 488 GT3 | 13 laps | |
| 2018 | 2 | (United Kingdom) Michael Benham (United Kingdom) Duncan Tappy | (United Kingdom) Lanan Racing | Norma M30 | (Switzerland) Christoph Ulrich (Italy) Maurizio Mediani | (Switzerland) Spirit of Race | Ferrari 488 GT3 | 12 laps | |
| 2019 | 1 | (France) Adrien Chila (France) Nicolas Schatz | (France) Graff | Norma M30 | (Denmark) Mikkel Mac (France) Fabien Lavergne | (United States) Luzich Racing | Ferrari 488 GT3 | 11 laps | |
| 2019 | 2 | (France) François Kirmann (Germany) Laurents Hörr | (Luxembourg) DKR Engineering | Norma M30 | (Denmark) Mikkel Mac (France) Fabien Lavergne | (United States) Luzich Racing | Ferrari 488 GT3 | 14 laps | |
| 2020 | 1 | (Belgium) Jean Glorieux (Germany) Laurents Hörr | (Luxembourg) DKR Engineering | Duqueine M30 - D08 | (Italy) Andrea Caldarelli (Japan) Hiroshi Hamaguchi | (China) FFF Racing Team | Lamborghini Huracán GT3 | 13 laps | |
| 2020 | 2 | (France) Edouard Cauhaupé (France) Nicolas Maulini | (Switzerland) Cool Racing | Ligier JS P320 | (Italy) Andrea Caldarelli (Japan) Hiroshi Hamaguchi | (China) FFF Racing Team | Lamborghini Huracán GT3 | 12 laps | |
| 2021 | 1 | (United Kingdom) Anthony Wells (United Kingdom) Colin Noble | (United Kingdom) Nielsen Racing | Ligier JS P320 | (Finland) Rory Penttinen (United States) Logan Sargeant | (Italy) Iron Lynx | Ferrari 488 GT3 Evo 2020 | 12 laps | |
| 2021 | 2 | (Germany) Moritz Kranz (Belgium) Ugo de Wilde | (Belgium) Mühlner Motorsport | Duqueine M30 - D08 | (France) Julien Andlauer (Switzerland) Nicolas Leutwiler | (Switzerland) Pzoberer Zürichsee by TFT | Porsche 911 GT3 R | 13 laps | |
| 2022 | 1 | (France) Tom Dillmann (Germany) Alexander Mattschull | (Switzerland) Racing Spirit of Léman | Ligier JS P320 | (Italy) Emanuele Busnelli (Italy) Fabio Babini | (Italy) Ebimotors | Porsche 911 GT3 R | 12 laps | |
| 2022 | 2 | (United Kingdom) Michael Benham (United Kingdom) Duncan Tappy | (Switzerland) Cool Racing | Ligier JS P320 | (Denmark) Kasper Jensen (Denmark) Kristian Poulsen | (Denmark) GMB Motorsport | Honda NSX GT3 Evo22 | 11 laps | |
| 2023 | 1 | (Portugal) Manuel Espírito Santo (United Kingdom) Martin Rich | (Poland) Team Virage | Ligier JS P320 | (Germany) Max Hesse (United Kingdom) Tim Whale | (Belgium) Team WRT | BMW M4 GT3 | 11 laps | |
| 2023 | 2 | (Switzerland) Luis Sanjuan (Switzerland) David Droux | (Switzerland) Cool Racing | Ligier JS P320 | (France) Jérôme Policand (Italy) Valentino Rossi | (Belgium) Team WRT | BMW M4 GT3 | 11 laps | |
| 2024 | 1 | (Germany) Torsten Kratz (Germany) Leonard Weiss | (Germany) Wochenspielgel Team Monschau by Rinaldi Racing | Duqueine M30 - D08 | (Italy) David Fumanelli (France) Frédéric Jousset | (Switzerland) Kessel Racing | Ferrari 296 GT3 | 4 laps | |
| 2024 | 2 | (France) Christophe Cresp (Spain) Maximus Mayer | (France) MV2S Racing | Ligier JS P320 | (Australia) Martin Berry (United Kingdom) Lorcan Hanafin | (United Kingdom) Blackthorn | Aston Martin Vantage AMR GT3 Evo | 10 laps | |
| 2025 | 1 | (France) Adrien Closmenil (Denmark) Theodor Jensen | (Switzerland) CLX Motorsport | Ligier JS P325 | (United States) Anthony Bartone (Luxembourg) Steve Jans | (Germany) GetSpeed Performance | Mercedes-AMG GT3 Evo | 14 laps | |
| 2025 | 2 | (Switzerland) Léna Bühler (Italy) Matteo Quintarelli | (France) 23Events Racing | Ligier JS P325 | (Austria) Lukas Dunner (Germany) Heiko Neumann | (Austria) Team Motopark | Mercedes-AMG GT3 Evo | 10 laps | |
