= Erik Maris =

French racing driver (born 1964)

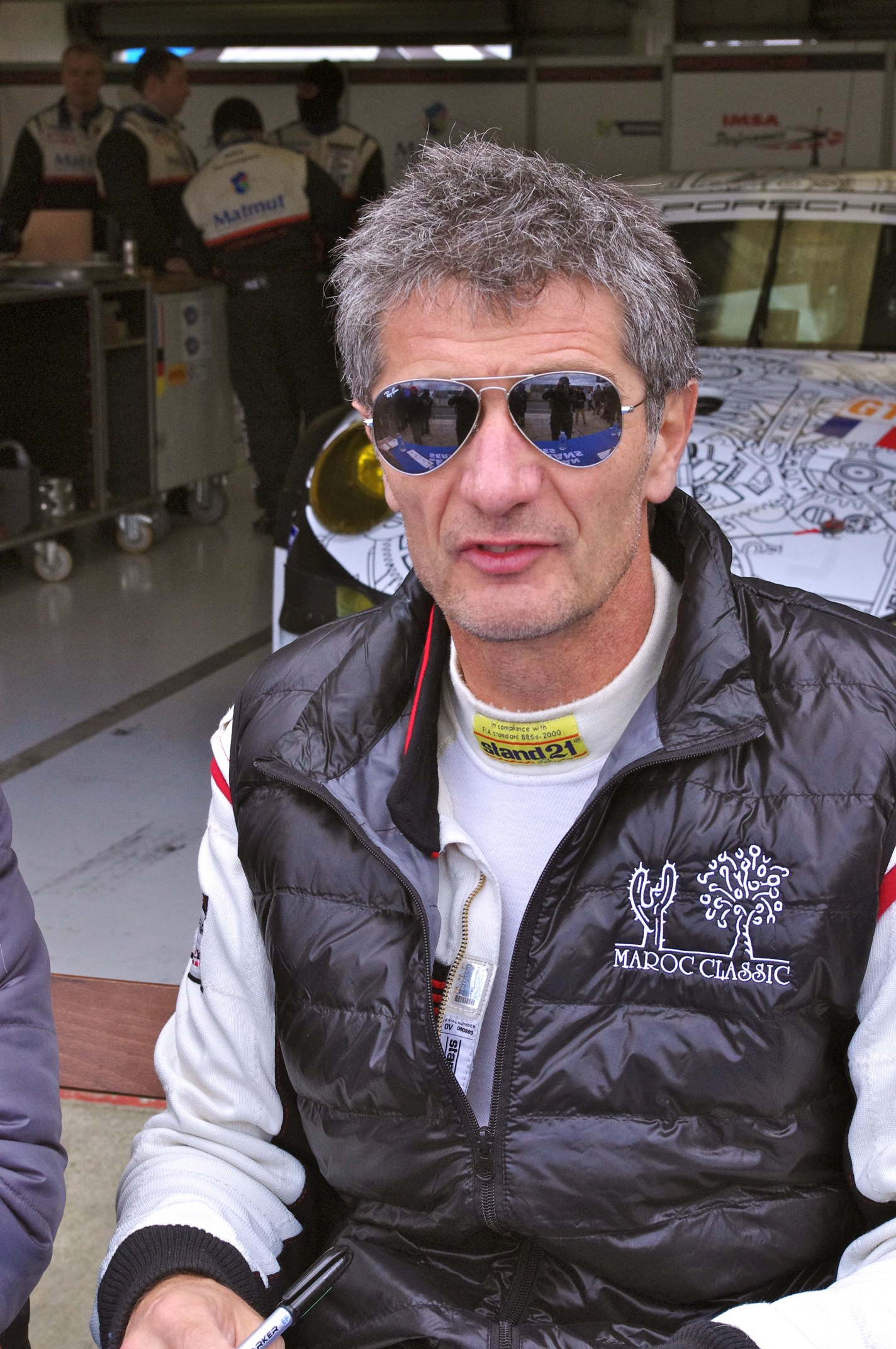
- Maris in 2014
- Nationality: (France) French
- Born: Erik Raymond Jean Alain Maris; 16 February 1964 (age 62) Angers, France
- Categorisation: FIA Bronze

Erik Raymond Jean Alain Maris (born 16 February 1964) is a French businessman, racing driver and navigator.

== Business ventures ==
A Graduate of HEC Paris, Maris began working at Morgan Stanley in 1988, before joining Lazard in 1991. During his time at Lazard, Maris specialized in telecommunications and media and became the company's co-head of its consulting practice in late 2009, but was demoted to managing partner the following June by Kenneth M. Jacobs.

In 2010, Maris and Jean-Marie Messier co-founded Messier Maris et Associés, an M&A advisory boutique first established in 2003 as Messier Partners. His tenure at the company lasted until September 2020, when he left following several disagreements with Messier. The following month, Maris joined Advent International, a private equity fund, as an advisory partner. In late 2024, Maris joined Perella Weinberg France as vice-chairman.

== Sailing career ==
Maris was introduced to sailing in the late 1960s and competed in the Tour de France à la voile as well as the Admiral's Cup in 1987, before returning to the sport from 2002 to 2012. Five years later, Maris resumed his sailing career as he entered the GC32 Racing Tour, and still competes as of July 2025.

== Racing career ==
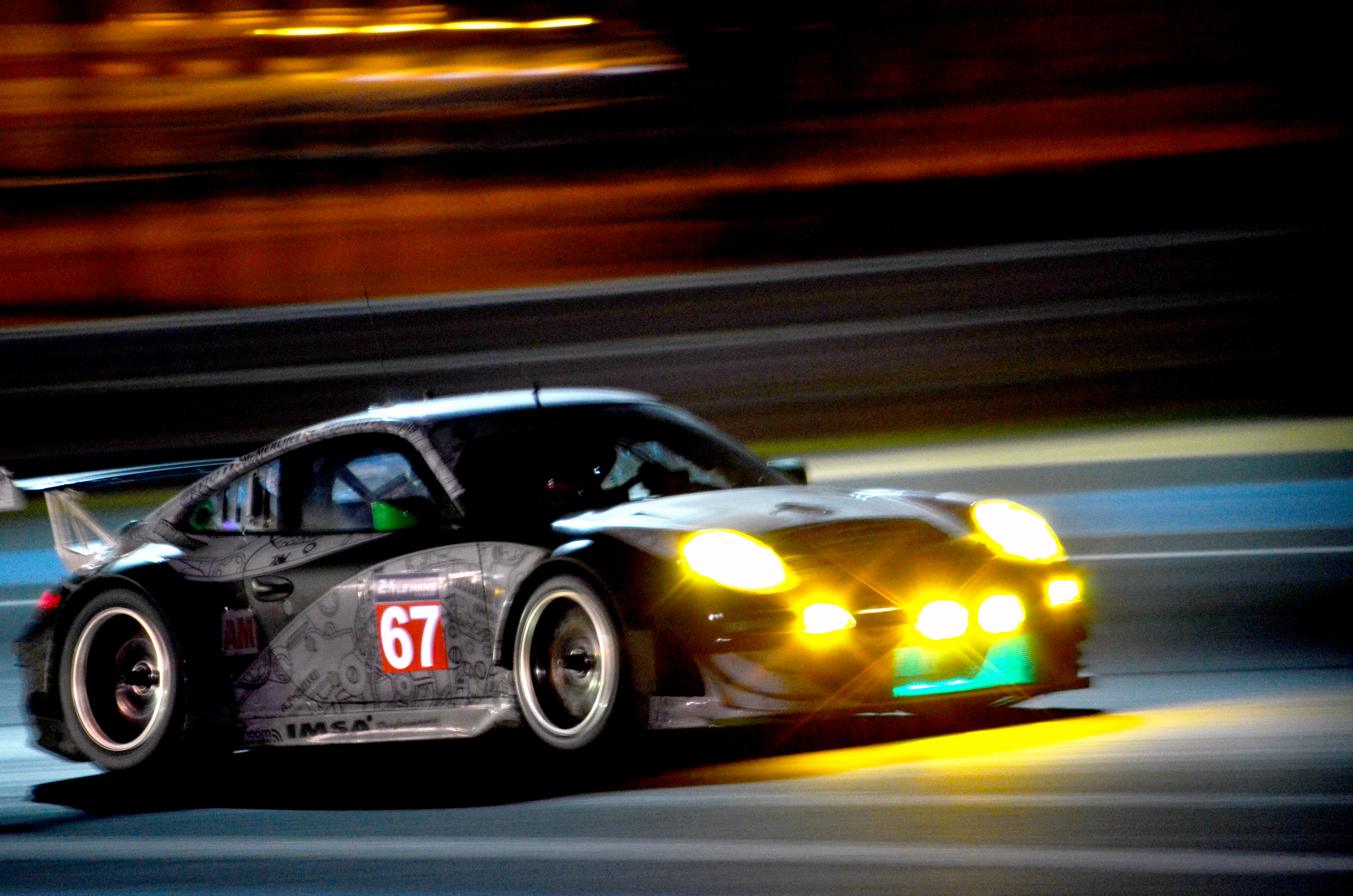
Maris driving at night during his 24 Hours of Le Mans debut in 2014.

Maris made his car racing debut in 2011, in the V de V Challenge Endurance VHC. Two years later, Maris joined OAK Racing to make his FIA World Endurance Championship debut at the 6 Hours of Circuit of the Americas in LMP2. The following year, Maris finished on the A6-Am podium of the Dubai 24 Hour for Spirit of Race, before joining IMSA Performance for the rest of the year to compete in the LMGTE class of the European Le Mans Series, driving a Porsche 997 GT3-RSR. During 2014, Maris also raced at the 24 Hours of Le Mans with the same team in LMGTE Am.

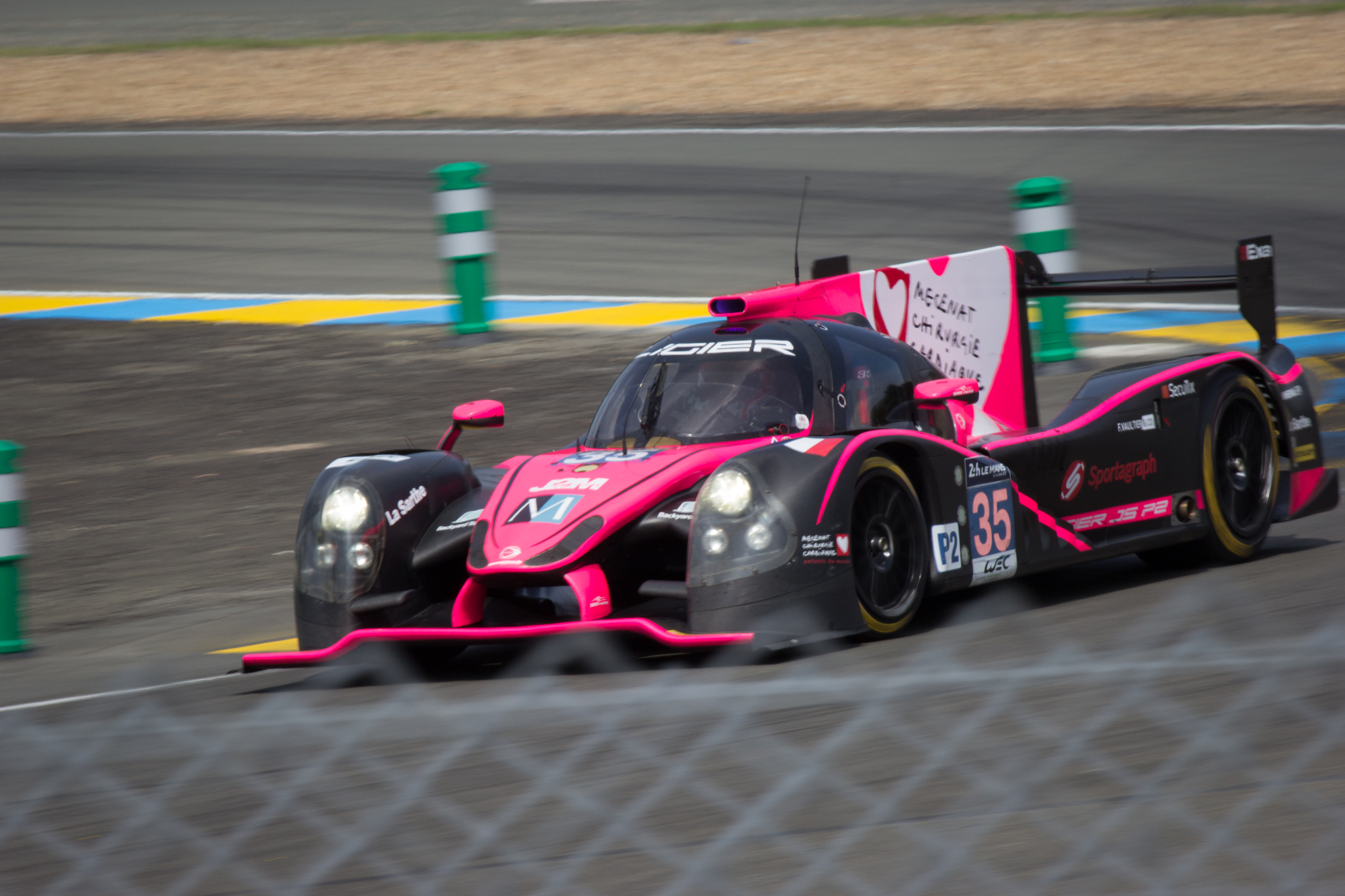
Maris secured his best LMP2 finish of 5th at Silverstone 2015 with OAK Racing.

Maris then returned to OAK Racing and LMP2 competition for 2015, racing with them in the first three rounds of the FIA World Endurance Championship, including the 24 Hours of Le Mans, where he placed eleventh. A season in the LMP3 class of the European Le Mans Series and a third appearance at the 24 Hours of Le Mans, for SO24! by Lombard Racing in LMP2, then ensued, before returning to the French enduro for a fourth consecutive time, now with Eurasia Motorsport, in 2017.

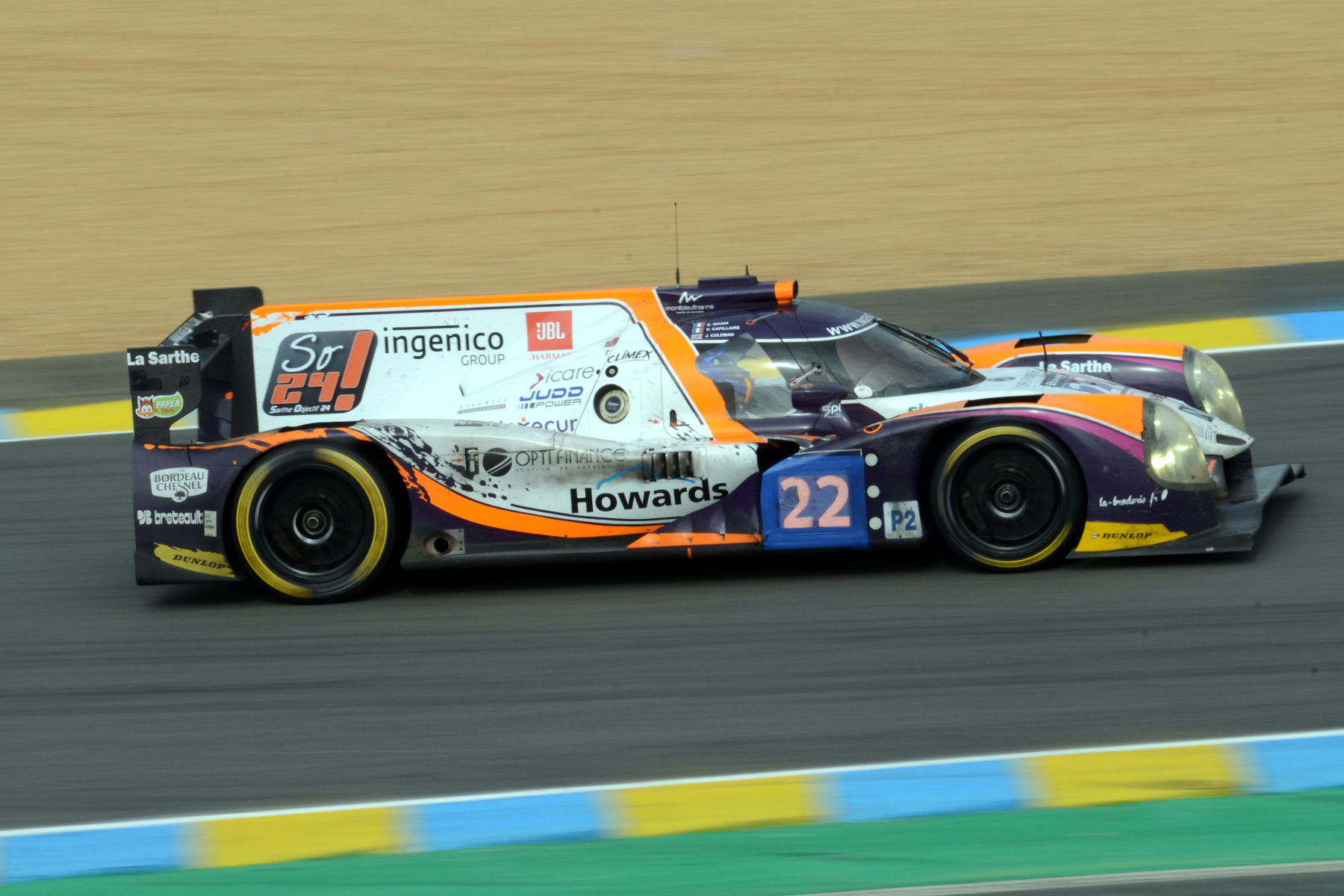
Maris aboard his Lombard Racing Ligier at Le Mans in 2016.

In 2018, Maris switched to IDEC Sport to race in select rounds of the European Le Mans Series in LMP2, as well as joining Ebimotors to race in the LMGTE Am class of the 24 Hours of Le Mans, in which he finished sixth at the wheel of a Porsche 911 RSR. Another part-time season in ELMS with IDEC Sport then followed in 2019, during which he raced at the Road to Le Mans for United Autosports in LMP3, as well as the 24 Hours of Spa for BMW-fielding Boutsen Ginion. Maris then made a one-off appearance in the following year's Le Mans Cup for IDEC Sport in GT3, and also raced for EuroInternational at the 24 Hours of Le Mans in LMP2, before switching his attention to classic races.

== Racing record ==
=== Racing career summary ===
Season	Series	Team	Races	Wins	Poles	F/Laps	Podiums	Points	Position
2013	FIA World Endurance Championship – LMP2	OAK Racing	1	0	0	0	0	4	27th
2014	Dubai 24 Hour – A6-Am	Spirit of Race	1	0	0	0	1	—N/a	**3rd**
2014	European Le Mans Series – LMGTE	IMSA Performance Matmut	5	0	0	0	0	3	24th
2014	24 Hours of Le Mans – LMGTE Am	IMSA Performance Matmut	1	0	0	0	0	—N/a	13th
2014	Le Mans Classic – Plateau 6		3	0	0	0	0	0	11th
2015	FIA World Endurance Championship – LMP2	OAK Racing	3	0	0	0	0	34	14th
2015	24 Hours of Le Mans – LMP2	OAK Racing	1	0	0	0	0	—N/a	11th
2016	European Le Mans Series – LMP3	OAK Racing	6	0	0	0	0	3	28th
2016	24 Hours of Le Mans – LMP2	SO24! by Lombard Racing	1	0	0	0	0	—N/a	14th
2016	Le Mans Classic – Plateau 6		3	0	0	0	0	0	39th
2017	V de V Endurance Series – LMP3	Duqueine Engineering	1	0	0	0	0	9	30th
2017	24 Hours of Le Mans – LMP2	Eurasia Motorsport	1	0	0	0	0	—N/a	13th
2018	European Le Mans Series – LMP2	IDEC Sport	4	0	0	0	0	1.25	29th
2018	24 Hours of Le Mans – LMGTE Am	Ebimotors	1	0	0	0	0	—N/a	6th
2018	Le Mans Classic – Plateau 6							0	79th
2018	Group C Racing – Class 3		2	0	0	0	0	13	12th
2019	European Le Mans Series – LMP2	IDEC Sport	3	0	0	0	0	0.5	35th
2019	Le Mans Cup – LMP3	United Autosports	2	0	0	0	0	0	NC†
2019	Blancpain GT Series Endurance Cup – Am	Boutsen Ginion	1	0	0	0	0	4	28th
2019	Intercontinental GT Challenge	Boutsen Ginion	1	0	0	0	0	0	NC
2019	Classic Endurance Racing – GT1		1	0	0	0	1	42.5	22nd
2019	Classic Endurance Racing – GT2							7	31st
2019	Heritage Touring Cup – TC2		1	0	0	0	0	20	72nd
2019	Group C Racing – Class 3		3	2	0	1	2	42.5	5th
2020	Le Mans Cup – GT3	IDEC Sport	1	0	0	0	0	0	NC
2020	24 Hours of Le Mans – LMP2	EuroInternational	1	0	0	0	0	—N/a	DNF
2020	Endurance Racing Legends – GT2A							4.5	7th
2020	Heritage Touring Cup – TC2		1	0	0	0	0	24	23rd
2020	Group C Racing – Class 3		5	0	0	1	0	2.5	5th
2025	Le Mans Classic – Endurance Racing Legends GT		1	0	0	0	0	—N/a	NC

^{†} As Maris was a guest driver, he was ineligible to score points.

=== Complete FIA World Endurance Championship results ===
Year	Entrant	Class	Car	Engine	1	2	3	4	5	6	7	8	Rank	Pts
2013	OAK Racing	LMP2	Morgan LMP2	Nissan VK45DE 4.5 L V8	SIL	SPA	LMS	SÃO	COA; 8	FUJ	SHA	BHR	27th	4
2015	OAK Racing	LMP2	Ligier JS P2	Nissan VK45DE 4.5 L V8	SIL; 5	SPA; 6	LMS; 6	NÜR	COA	FUJ	SHA	BHR	14th	34

=== Complete European Le Mans Series results ===
(key) (Races in bold indicate pole position; results in italics indicate fastest lap)

Year	Entrant	Class	Chassis	Engine	1	2	3	4	5	6	Rank	Points
2014	IMSA Performance Matmut	LMGTE	Porsche 997 GT3-RSR	Porsche M97/74 4.0 L Flat-6	SIL; 12	IMO; 11	RBR; 12	LEC; 11	EST; 10		24th	3
2016	OAK Racing	LMP3	Ligier JS P3	Nissan VK50VE 5.0 L V8	SIL; 12	IMO; 14	RBR; 16	LEC; 12	SPA; 14	EST; 12	28th	3
2018	IDEC Sport	LMP2	Ligier JS P217	Gibson GK428 4.2 L V8	LEC; Ret	MNZ; 12	RBR; 16	SIL	SPA; 14	ALG	29th	1.25
2019	IDEC Sport	LMP2	Ligier JS P217	Gibson GK428 4.2 L V8	LEC; Ret	MNZ; 16	CAT	SIL	SPA; Ret	ALG	35th	0.5

=== Complete 24 Hours of Le Mans results ===
Year	Team	Co-Drivers	Car	Class	Laps	Pos.	Class Pos.
2014	(France) IMSA Performance Matmut	(France) Éric Hélary (France) Jean-Marc Merlin	Porsche 997 GT3-RSR	LMGTE Am	317	34th	13th
2015	(France) OAK Racing	(France) Jean-Marc Merlin (France) Jacques Nicolet	Ligier JS P2-Nissan	LMP2	328	29th	11th
2016	(France) SO24! by Lombard Racing	(France) Vincent Capillaire (United Kingdom) Jonathan Coleman	Oreca 03R-Nissan	LMP2	328	32nd	14th
2017	(Philippines) Eurasia Motorsport	(France) Jacques Nicolet (France) Pierre Nicolet	Ligier JS P217-Gibson	LMP2	341	15th	13th
2018	(Italy) Ebimotors	(Italy) Fabio Babini (Denmark) Christina Nielsen	Porsche 911 RSR	LMGTE Am	332	31st	6th
2020	(United States) EuroInternational	(Belgium) Christophe D'Ansembourg (France) Adrien Tambay	Ligier JS P217-Gibson	LMP2	26	DNF	DNF

=== Complete Le Mans Cup results ===
(key) (Races in bold indicate pole position; results in italics indicate fastest lap)

Year	Entrant	Class	Chassis	1	2	3	4	5	6	7	Rank	Points
2019	United Autosports	LMP3	Ligier JS P3	LEC	MNZ	LMS; 1; 14	LMS; 2; 25	CAT	SPA	ALG	NC†	0†
2020	IDEC Sport	GT3	Mercedes-AMG GT3	LEC1; Ret	SPA	LEC2	LMS; 1	LMS; 2	MNZ	ALG	NC	0

=== Complete GT World Challenge results ===
==== GT World Challenge Europe Endurance Cup ====
Year	Team	Car	Class	1	2	3	4	5	6	7	Pos.	Points
2019	Boutsen Ginion	BMW M6 GT3	Am	MNZ	SIL	LEC	SPA; 6H; 60	SPA; 12H; 54	SPA; 24H; 46	CAT	28th	4
