= 2019 Road to Le Mans =

Motor season

The track layout of the Circuit de la Sarthe

The 4th Road to Le Mans was an automobile endurance event composed of two 55-minute races contested by 49 teams of two drivers each racing Le Mans Prototype 3 (LMP3) and Group GT3 (GT3) cars. It took place on 13 and 15 June 2019 at the Circuit de la Sarthe, near Le Mans, France, as a support event for the 2019 24 Hours of Le Mans and it was the third round of the 2019 Le Mans Cup. The Automobile Club de l'Ouest (ACO) organised the fourth Road to Le Mans race along with the Le Mans Cup promoter Le Mans Endurance Management.

A Norma M30-Nissan car shared by Adrien Chila and Nicolas Schatz of Graff won the first race after starting from fifth position and taking the lead when the Lanan Racing team of Michael Benham and Duncan Tappy were penalised for an unsafe release during the mandatory pit stops. The DKR Engineering pair of Marco Cencetti and Marcello Marateotto finished in second and Colin Noble and Anthony Wells of Nielsen Racing were third. The GT3 category was won by the Luzich Racing duo of Fabien Lavergne and Mikkel Mac from SPS Automotive Performance's Tom Onslow-Cole and Valentin Pierburg. The second race was won by the DKR duo of Laurents Hörr and François Kirmann after overtaking Jacques Wolff in the final four laps. Benham and Tappy repeated their first race result in second and Chila and Schatz completed the overall podium in third. Lavergne and Mac led every lap in GT3 and completed a victory sweep at Le Mans by 1.2 seconds ahead of Beechdean AMR's Ross Gunn and Andrew Howard.

== Background ==
The Automobile Club de l'Ouest (ACO) organised the 2019 Road to Le Mans for Le Mans Prototype 3 (LMP3) and Group GT3 (GT3) cars along with the Michelin Le Mans Cup promoter Le Mans Endurance Management, the ACO's event organisation branch. It took place at the 13.626 km (8.467 mi) Circuit de la Sarthe, near Le Mans, France on 13 and 15 June 2019. This was the fourth running of the race, the third round in the 2019 Le Mans Cup and it served as a support event for the 2019 24 Hours of Le Mans.

Michael Benham and Duncan Tappy led the LMP3 Drivers' Championship with 50 championship points following victories at Paul Ricard and Monza. They were 13 championship points ahead of the second-placed Laurents Hörr and François Kirmann and 20 in front of Colin Noble and Anthony Wells in third. Sergio Pianezzola and Giacomo Piccini led the GT3 Drivers' Championship with 44 championship points and one class victory, three ahead of the second-placed Fabien Lavergne and Mikkel Mac. The No. 25 Lanan Racing team led the LMP3 Teams' Championship with 50 championship points, leading the No. 3 DKR Engineering squad by 13 championship points. With 44 championship points, the No. 8 Kessel Racing team led the LMP3 Teams' Championship by three championship points over the No. 71 Luzich Racing squad.

== Regulations and entrants ==
Entry to the race was open from 11 March to 4 April 2019 and a maximum of 50 cars could participate. A selection committee invited all current Le Mans Cup entrants and selected one-off entries to the race. All full-time Le Mans Cup entrants automatically earned invitations. Teams competing in Le Mans-based endurance racing series such as the Asian Le Mans Series (ALMS), the Asian Le Mans Sprint Cup, the European Le Mans Series (ELMS) and the IMSA SportsCar Championship received priority in getting invitations. Each car was piloted by two drivers and each team had to sign a Bronze-rated driver and either a second Bronze-rated or a Silver or Gold-rated racer. A driver was permitted no more than at least 20 minutes to drive on the track and the race regulations dictated a change of driver during the mandatory pit stops. According to the race's regulations, all teams had to make a mandatory pit stop lasting no less than two minutes between the 22nd and 32nd minutes of both races. All full-time Le Mans Cup competitors in both classes were eligible to score championship points provided they finished anywhere from first and below. The two pole position winners for each of the two races in each class received one championship point.

The entry list was published by the ACO on 23 April 2019. The 50-car entry list included 33 LMP3 and 17 GT3 vehicles. In addition to the 34 guaranteed Le Mans Cup entries, there were 11 ELMS entries, one each from the ALMS and the FIA World Endurance Championship while the rest of the field was filled with one-off entries only competing at Le Mans. There were two manufacturers represented in the LMP3 and they were Ligier and Norma with Adess and Ginetta cars absent. There were six manufacturers (Aston Martin, Bentley, Ferrari, Lamborghini, Mercedes-Benz and Porsche) who were represented in the GT3 category. Ferrari was the most represented manufacturer in GT3 with nine cars while Lamborghini and Porsche were represented by just one team each. A crew of three disabled drivers sharing a modified Ligier JS P3-Nissan was entered by Filière Frédéric Sausset by SRT41 as preparation for a potential future entry to the 2020 24 Hours of Le Mans. Pianezzola was the only driver and Graff, Inter Europol Competition, Kessel Racing, RLR Msport, Spirit of Race, TF Sport and United Autosports were the seven teams to participate in both the Road to Le Mans and the 24 Hours of Le Mans. There were four entries that were listed as reserves.

== Practice ==
Two one-hour practice sessions were held on the evening of 12 June and the morning of 13 June. Noble set the fastest time of the first practice session with a lap of 3:54.896 done in the No. 2 Nielsen Racing Norma M30 car. The No. 24 United Autosports Ligier entry driven by Wayne Boyd was second, ahead of Hörr's No. 3 DKR Norma vehicle. The session was temporarily stopped when the No. 74 Cool Racing Ligier went off the circuit and crashed into the wall. Mac aboard the No. 71 Luzich Ferrari lapped fastest in the GT3 class with a time of 3:58.083 that was good enough for sixth overall. Valentin Pierburg in the No. 40 SPS Automotive Performance Mercedes was second-quickest. The No. 95 Bentley Team Africa Le Mans car stopped on the circuit, necessitating a short Slow Zone period for its recovery.

The circuit was declared wet for the beginning of the second practice session and rain fell on Le Mans to create a slippery surface for drivers and squads. Matt Bell was the pace setter in the No. 22 United Autosports Ligier car with a lap time of 4:00.120, more than five seconds slower than the previous day's pace. Bell was almost a second faster than Benham's No. 25 Lanan entry in second. Pianezzola led the GT3 category with a 4:09.140 lap set in the No. 8 Kessel Ferrari and was fast enough for sixth overall. Flick Haigh's No. 97 TF Aston Martin was 0.120 seconds slower in second.

== Qualifying ==
There were two 20-minute qualifying sessions held on the afternoon of 13 June to set the starting order for both races. The first session saw any one driver be allowed by their teams to participate and determine the starting grid for the first race. Each team's Bronze-rated driver partook in the second session to set the starting order for the second race. In dry weather conditions, Hörr carried the No. 3 DKR Norma entry to provisional pole position early in the first qualifying session until Tappy's No. 25 Lanan car lapped faster than him. Hörr set the fastest first and second sectors to set a LMP3-category lap record of 3:49.570 to achieve pole position. Tappy's effort was good enough to secure second place. Yann Ehrlacher qualified the No. 19 M Racing vehicle in third position, ahead of Noble's No. 2 Nielsen entry and Nicolas Schatz's No. 39 Graff car. Ross Gunn took the maiden Le Mans Cup pole position of his career with a lap time of 3:55.887 in the No. 99 Beechdean AMR Aston Martin. The No. 97 TF Aston Martin of Tom Gamble was second in class. Mac carried the No. 71 Luzich Ferrari to third.

The second qualifying session took place in dry weather conditions. It saw Benham's No. 25 Lanan Norma car achieve pole position with a lap time of 3:54.308 set at the conclusion of the session. Kirman's No. 3 DKR entry was three-tenths of a second slower in second place. Freddie Hunt's No. 15 RLR Msport entry set the third-quickest lap, followed by Marcello Marateotto's No. 5 DKR car and Nicolas Mélin's No. 11 Racing Experience car. Lavergne put the No. 71 Luzich Ferrari on pole position in the GT3 category with a 3:59.877 lap set at the end of qualifying. Pierburg aboard the No. 40 SPS Automotive Mercedes was 3.6 slower in second and the No. 99 Beechdean Aston Martin driven by Andrew Howard was third. Qualifying was stopped after nine minutes to recover a vehicle that was stuck in the first chicane's gravel trap and to remove debris, resulting in the quickest lap times being set at the conclusion of the session.

=== Qualifying results ===
Teams who set the pole position lap time in each class in the two qualifying sessions are denoted in bold and by a †.

==== First qualifying session ====
Final classification of the first qualifying session
Pos.	Class	No.	Team	Qualifying	Grid
1	**LMP3**	**3**	**DKR Engineering**	**3:49.570**	1†
2	LMP3	25	Lanan Racing	3:51.432	2
3	LMP3	19	M Racing	3:51.556	3
4	LMP3	2	Nielsen Racing	3:52.149	4
5	LMP3	39	Graff	3:52.473	5
6	LMP3	5	DKR Engineering	3:53.729	6
7	LMP3	22	United Autosports	3:54.615	7
8	LMP3	24	United Autosports	3:54.722	8
9	LMP3	18	Nielsen Racing	3:55.003	9
10	LMP3	9	Graff	3:55.297	10
11	**GT3**	**99**	**Beechdean AMR**	**3:55.887**	11†
12	LMP3	23	United Autosports	3:56.073	12
13	LMP3	4	Cool Racing	3:56.302	13
14	LMP3	20	Grainmarket Racing	3:56.307	14
15	LMP3	90	AT Racing	3:56.478	15
16	LMP3	43	Keo Racing	3:57.364	16
17	LMP3	74	Cool Racing	3:57.377	17
18	LMP3	14	RLR Msport	3:57.724	18
19	GT3	97	TF Sport	3:58.118	19
20	LMP3	11	Racing Experience	3:58.241	20
21	GT3	71	Luzich Racing	3:58.864	21
22	LMP3	55	Spirit of Race	3:59.506	22
23	GT3	40	SPS Automotive Performance	3:59.540	23
24	GT3	8	Kessel Racing	3:59.602	24
25	GT3	82	Kessel Racing	3:59.911	25
26	GT3	54	SPS Automotive Performance	4:00.130	26
27	LMP3	65	Viper Niza Racing	4:00.178	27
28	LMP3	69	Monza Garage	4:00.225	28
29	LMP3	91	Graff	4:00.266	29
30	LMP3	30	CD Sport	4:00.285	30
31	GT3	51	Spirit of Race	4:00.304	31
32	GT3	52	Spirit of Race	4:00.488	32
33	LMP3	72	Graff	4:01.144	33
34	GT3	62	Kessel Racing	4:01.148	34
35	LMP3	27	United Autosports	4:01.704	35
36	LMP3	15	RLR Msport	4:02.416	36
37	GT3	35	Krypton Motorsport	4:02.577	37
38	GT3	53	Spirit of Race	4:03.161	38
39	GT3	83	Scuderia Villorba Corse	4:03.311	39
40	GT3	7	Scuderia Villorba Corse	4:08.456	40
41	LMP3	29	DKR Engineering	4:09.440	41
42	GT3	88	Ebimotors	4:12.264	42
43	LMP3	13	Inter Europol Competition	4:12.962	43
44	GT3	95	Bentley Team Africa Le Mans	4:13.949	44
45	LMP3	60	CD Sport	4:14.452	45
46	LMP3	17	Nielsen Racing	4:16.510	46
47	GT3	50	Kessel Racing	4:18.829	47
48	INV	84	SRT41 - Frédéric Sausset	No time	48
49	LMP3	96	Cool Racing	No time	49
50	GT3	17	Pablo Clark Racing Team LeMans	No time	50
51	GT3	20	Pablo Clark Racing Team LeMans	No time	51

==== Second qualifying session ====
Final classification of the second qualifying session
Pos.	Class	No.	Team	Qualifying	Grid
1	**LMP3**	**25**	**Lanan Racing**	**3:54.308**	1†
2	LMP3	3	DKR Engineering	3:54.629	2
3	LMP3	15	RLR Msport	3:56.779	3
4	LMP3	5	DKR Engineering	3:57.184	4
5	LMP3	11	Racing Experience	3:59.281	5
6	**GT3**	**71**	**Luzich Racing**	**3:59.877**	6†
7	LMP3	30	CD Sport	3:59.915	7
8	LMP3	2	Nielsen Racing	4:00.244	8
9	LMP3	14	RLR Msport	4:00.343	9
10	LMP3	39	Graff	4:00.351	10
11	GT3	8	Kessel Racing	4:00.459	11
12	LMP3	43	Keo Racing	4:00.994	12
13	LMP3	19	M Racing	4:01.079	13
14	LMP3	72	Graff	4:01.171	14
15	LMP3	17	Nielsen Racing	4:02.213	15
16	LMP3	9	Graff	4:03.151	16
17	GT3	40	SPS Automotive Performance	4:03.517	17
18	LMP3	24	United Autosports	4:03.527	18
19	GT3	99	Beechdean AMR	4:04.434	19
20	LMP3	22	United Autosports	4:04.642	20
21	LMP3	91	Graff	4:04.711	21
22	GT3	51	Spirit of Race	4:04.719	22
23	GT3	88	Ebimotors	4:05.418	23
24	LMP3	23	United Autosports	4:06.301	24
25	LMP3	74	Cool Racing	4:06.533	25
26	GT3	97	TF Sport	4:06.820	26
27	LMP3	96	Cool Racing	4:06.980	27
28	LMP3	90	AT Racing	4:07.007	28
29	LMP3	4	Cool Racing	4:07.038	29
30	LMP3	29	DKR Engineering	4:07.337	30
31	LMP3	18	Nielsen Racing	4:08.894	31
32	LMP3	20	Grainmarket Racing	4:12.163	32
33	GT3	52	Spirit of Race	4:12.620	33
34	LMP3	60	CD Sport	4:12.849	34
35	GT3	40	SPS Automotive Performance	4:13.249	35
36	GT3	83	Scuderia Villorba Corse	4:13.302	36
37	GT3	35	Krypton Motorsport	4:14.328	37
38	INV	84	SRT41 - Frédéric Sausset	4:15.122	38
39	LMP3	13	Inter Europol Competition	4:15.223	39
40	LMP3	55	Spirit of Race	4:15.887	40
41	GT3	53	Spirit of Race	4:17.026	41
42	GT3	7	Scuderia Villorba Corse	4:20.501	42
43	GT3	50	Kessel Racing	4:21.544	43
44	LMP3	65	Viper Niza Racing	4:24.071	44
45	GT3	62	Kessel Racing	4:25.339	45
46	GT3	82	Kessel Racing	4:25.471	46
47	LMP3	27	United Autosports	No time	47
48	LMP3	69	Monza Garage	No time	48
49	GT3	95	Bentley Team Africa Le Mans	No time	49

== Races ==
=== Race one ===
The first 55-minute race commenced at 17:30 local time on 13 June. It was held in dry weather conditions ranging from 20.4 to 21.25 °C (68.72 to 70.25 °F) and a track temperature between 25.75 and 26.65 °C (78.35 and 79.97 °F). When the race began, Ehrlacher in the No. 19 M Racing entry made a fast start from third position to take the race lead from Kirman's No. 3 DKR car through Dunlop Curve turn and into the Esses while James Littlejohn moved the No. 18 Nielsen car to third. In GT3, Gunn maintained the category lead as Lavergne was quick and moved into second in class while the No. 97 TF Aston Martin dropped from second to fourth as Tom Onslow-Cole's No. 40 SPS Mercedes moved to third in GT3. At the end of lap one, Kirman entered the pit lane for a replacement nose cone because the No. 3 DKR vehicle sustained front-end damage from an unseen incident. Bell was now second overall in the No. 22 United Autosports car while Wells's No. 2 Nielsen car dropped out of the top ten after starting in fourth.

Around a third into the race, the No. 9 Graff Norma car driven by Adrien Trouillet went off the circuit on the exit of the Karting section of the Porsche Curves and struck the inside concrete barrier. The circuit was littered with broken polystyrene advertising boards, leading to the safety car's deployment. The safety car period allowed all of the teams to make their mandatory pit stops, as the debris was removed from the circuit, elongating the clean-up period. The No. 19 M Racing car that was now driven by Laurent Millara remained the outright leader during the pit stops. GT3 saw Howard maintained the class lead the No. 99 Beechdean Aston Martin had held since the start of the race. When racing resumed with 19 minutes remaining, Tappy had moved into second and overtook Millara to claim the overall lead. Tappy pulled the No. 25 Lanan Norma car clear from the rest of the field. Schatz was fourth but moved into second with passes on Jim McGuire's No. 22 United Autosports car and Millara.

Pierburg in the No. 40 SPS Mercedes was gaining on the GT3 class leading Howard but Mac's No. 71 Luzich Ferrari soon caught and overtook both cars to claim the category lead with 12 minutes left. The overall-leading No. 25 Lanan car was imposed a drive-through penalty for an unsafe release from the pit box that resulted in contact with a United Autosports vehicle exiting the pit lane. Tappy took the penalty with eight minutes to go dropped to fifth while the overall lead went to Schatz. Tappy was able to recover to fourth with a pass on Millara. At the front, Schazt maintained the No. 39 Graff car's lead to achieve overall victory for himself and co-driver Adrien Chila. They were 4.515 seconds ahead of DKR's Marco Cencetti and Marateotto in second. The Nielsen pair of Noble and Wells completed the podium in third position. The Luzich team of Lavergne and Mac won the GT3 category race by 15 seconds from the second-placed SPS duo of Onslow-Cole and Pierburg. The Spirit of Race pair of Maurizio Mediani and Christoph Ulrich completed the class podium in third.

==== Race one classification ====
Winners in each class are denoted in bold and ‡

Final classification of the first race
Pos	Class	No.	Team	Drivers	Chassis	Tyre	Laps	Time/Reason
Pos	Class	No.	Team	Drivers	Engine	Tyre	Laps	Time/Reason
1	**LMP3**	**39**	**(France) Graff**	**(France) Adrien Chila (France) Nicolas Schatz**	**Norma M30**	M	**11**	**56:00.771‡**
1	**LMP3**	**39**	**(France) Graff**	**(France) Adrien Chila (France) Nicolas Schatz**	**Nissan 5.0 L V8**	M	**11**	**56:00.771‡**
2	LMP3	5	(Luxembourg) DKR Engineering	(Italy) Marco Cencetti (Switzerland) Marcello Marateotto	Norma M30	M	11	+4.515
2	LMP3	5	(Luxembourg) DKR Engineering	(Italy) Marco Cencetti (Switzerland) Marcello Marateotto	Nissan 5.0 L V8	M	11	+4.515
3	LMP3	2	(United Kingdom) Nielsen Racing	(United Kingdom) Colin Noble (United Kingdom) Anthony Wells	Norma M30	M	11	+10.926
3	LMP3	2	(United Kingdom) Nielsen Racing	(United Kingdom) Colin Noble (United Kingdom) Anthony Wells	Nissan 5.0 L V8	M	11	+10.926
4	LMP3	25	(United Kingdom) Lanan Racing	(United Kingdom) Michael Benham (United Kingdom) Duncan Tappy	Norma M30	M	11	+20.528
4	LMP3	25	(United Kingdom) Lanan Racing	(United Kingdom) Michael Benham (United Kingdom) Duncan Tappy	Nissan 5.0 L V8	M	11	+20.528
5	LMP3	19	(France) M Racing	(France) Yann Ehrlacher (France) Laurent Millara	Norma M30	M	11	+32.021
5	LMP3	19	(France) M Racing	(France) Yann Ehrlacher (France) Laurent Millara	Nissan 5.0 L V8	M	11	+32.021
6	LMP3	3	(Luxembourg) DKR Engineering	(Germany) Laurents Hörr (France) François Kirmann	Norma M30	M	11	+32.810
6	LMP3	3	(Luxembourg) DKR Engineering	(Germany) Laurents Hörr (France) François Kirmann	Nissan 5.0 L V8	M	11	+32.810
7	LMP3	30	(Spain) CD Sport	(France) Kevin Bole-Besançon (France) Jacques Wolff	Norma M30	M	11	+41.443
7	LMP3	30	(Spain) CD Sport	(France) Kevin Bole-Besançon (France) Jacques Wolff	Nissan 5.0 L V8	M	11	+41.443
8	LMP3	15	(United Kingdom) RLR Msport	(United Kingdom) Freddie Hunt (Denmark) Martin Vedel Mortensen	Ligier JS P3	M	11	+46.769
8	LMP3	15	(United Kingdom) RLR Msport	(United Kingdom) Freddie Hunt (Denmark) Martin Vedel Mortensen	Nissan 5.0 L V8	M	11	+46.769
9	**GT3**	**71**	**(United States) Luzich Racing**	**(France) Fabien Lavergne (Denmark) Mikkel Mac**	**Ferrari 488 GT3**	M	**11**	**+49.655‡**
9	**GT3**	**71**	**(United States) Luzich Racing**	**(France) Fabien Lavergne (Denmark) Mikkel Mac**	**Ferrari F154CB 3.9 L Turbo V8**	M	**11**	**+49.655‡**
10	GT3	40	(Germany) SPS Automotive Performance	(United Kingdom) Tom Onslow-Cole (Germany) Valentin Pierburg	Mercedes-AMG GT3	M	11	+1:05.261
10	GT3	40	(Germany) SPS Automotive Performance	(United Kingdom) Tom Onslow-Cole (Germany) Valentin Pierburg	Mercedes-AMG M159 6.2 L V8	M	11	+1:05.261
11	GT3	51	(Switzerland) Spirit of Race	(Italy) Maurizio Mediani (Switzerland) Christoph Ulrich	Ferrari 488 GT3	M	11	+1:05.540
11	GT3	51	(Switzerland) Spirit of Race	(Italy) Maurizio Mediani (Switzerland) Christoph Ulrich	Ferrari F154CB 3.9 L Turbo V8	M	11	+1:05.540
12	LMP3	55	(Switzerland) Spirit of Race	(Italy) Michele Rugolo (Germany) Claudio Sdanewitsch	Ligier JS P3	M	11	+1:05.874
12	LMP3	55	(Switzerland) Spirit of Race	(Italy) Michele Rugolo (Germany) Claudio Sdanewitsch	Nissan 5.0 L V8	M	11	+1:05.874
13	GT3	82	(Switzerland) Kessel Racing	(Germany) Pierre Kaffer (United States) Pierre Mulacek	Ferrari 488 GT3	M	11	+1:08.931
13	GT3	82	(Switzerland) Kessel Racing	(Germany) Pierre Kaffer (United States) Pierre Mulacek	Ferrari F154CB 3.9 L Turbo V8	M	11	+1:08.931
14	LMP3	20	(United Kingdom) Grainmarket Racing	(United Kingdom) Mark Crader (United Kingdom) Alex Mortimer	Norma M30	M	11	+1:16.937
14	LMP3	20	(United Kingdom) Grainmarket Racing	(United Kingdom) Mark Crader (United Kingdom) Alex Mortimer	Nissan 5.0 L V8	M	11	+1:16.937
15	LMP3	96	(Switzerland) Cool Racing	(France) Romain Carton (France) Alexandre Coigny	Ligier JS P3	M	11	+1:21.135
15	LMP3	96	(Switzerland) Cool Racing	(France) Romain Carton (France) Alexandre Coigny	Nissan 5.0 L V8	M	11	+1:21.135
16	LMP3	91	(France) Graff	(Liechtenstein) Matthias Kaiser (Switzerland) Sebastien Page	Ligier JS P3	M	11	+1:21.693
16	LMP3	91	(France) Graff	(Liechtenstein) Matthias Kaiser (Switzerland) Sebastien Page	Nissan 5.0 L V8	M	11	+1:21.693
17	GT3	83	(Italy) Scuderia Villorba Corse	(France) Steeve Hiesse (France) Cédric Mézard	Lamborghini Huracán GT3	M	11	+1:21.807
17	GT3	83	(Italy) Scuderia Villorba Corse	(France) Steeve Hiesse (France) Cédric Mézard	Lamborghini 5.2 L V10	M	11	+1:21.807
18	LMP3	17	(United Kingdom) Nielsen Racing	(United Kingdom) Ivor Dunbar (United Kingdom) Bonamy Grimes	Norma M30	M	11	+1:21.967
18	LMP3	17	(United Kingdom) Nielsen Racing	(United Kingdom) Ivor Dunbar (United Kingdom) Bonamy Grimes	Nissan 5.0 L V8	M	11	+1:21.967
19	GT3	53	(Switzerland) Spirit of Race	(Portugal) Rui Águas (Greece) Kriton Lendoudis	Ferrari 488 GT3	M	11	+1:22.325
19	GT3	53	(Switzerland) Spirit of Race	(Portugal) Rui Águas (Greece) Kriton Lendoudis	Ferrari F154CB 3.9 L Turbo V8	M	11	+1:22.325
20	GT3	54	(Germany) SPS Automotive Performance	(Switzerland) Yannick Mettler (Switzerland) Dexter Müller	Mercedes-AMG GT3	M	11	+1:25.238
20	GT3	54	(Germany) SPS Automotive Performance	(Switzerland) Yannick Mettler (Switzerland) Dexter Müller	Mercedes-AMG M159 6.2 L V8	M	11	+1:25.238
21	GT3	88	(Italy) Ebimotors	(Italy) Alessandro Baccani (Italy) Paolo Venerosi	Porsche 911 GT3 R	M	11	+1:25.647
21	GT3	88	(Italy) Ebimotors	(Italy) Alessandro Baccani (Italy) Paolo Venerosi	Porsche 4.0 L Flat-6	M	11	+1:25.647
22	GT3	62	(Switzerland) Kessel Racing	(United States) Anthony Lazzaro (United States) Philippe Mulacek	Ferrari 488 GT3	M	11	+1:27.641
22	GT3	62	(Switzerland) Kessel Racing	(United States) Anthony Lazzaro (United States) Philippe Mulacek	Ferrari F154CB 3.9 L Turbo V8	M	11	+1:27.641
23	LMP3	27	(United States) United Autosports	(France) Patrice Lafargue (France) Erik Maris	Ligier JS P3	M	11	+1:42.197
23	LMP3	27	(United States) United Autosports	(France) Patrice Lafargue (France) Erik Maris	Nissan 5.0 L V8	M	11	+1:42.197
24	LMP3	23	(United States) United Autosports	(Canada) Garett Grist (United States) Rob Hodes	Ligier JS P3	M	11	+1:42.667
24	LMP3	23	(United States) United Autosports	(Canada) Garett Grist (United States) Rob Hodes	Nissan 5.0 L V8	M	11	+1:42.667
25	LMP3	72	(France) Graff	(France) Natan Bihel (France) Cyril Denis	Norma M30	M	11	+1:42.749
25	LMP3	72	(France) Graff	(France) Natan Bihel (France) Cyril Denis	Nissan 5.0 L V8	M	11	+1:42.749
26	GT3	8	(Switzerland) Kessel Racing	(Italy) Sergio Pianezzola (Italy) Giacomo Piccini	Ferrari 488 GT3	M	11	+1:47.664
26	GT3	8	(Switzerland) Kessel Racing	(Italy) Sergio Pianezzola (Italy) Giacomo Piccini	Ferrari F154CB 3.9 L Turbo V8	M	11	+1:47.664
27	GT3	97	(United Kingdom) TF Sport	(United Kingdom) Tom Gamble (United Kingdom) Flick Haigh	Aston Martin Vantage AMR GT3	M	11	+1:53.371
27	GT3	97	(United Kingdom) TF Sport	(United Kingdom) Tom Gamble (United Kingdom) Flick Haigh	Aston Martin 4.0 L Turbo V8	M	11	+1:53.371
28	LMP3	24	(United States) United Autosports	(United Kingdom) Wayne Boyd (United States) Najaf Husain	Ligier JS P3	M	11	+1:57.677
28	LMP3	24	(United States) United Autosports	(United Kingdom) Wayne Boyd (United States) Najaf Husain	Nissan 5.0 L V8	M	11	+1:57.677
29	LMP3	13	(Poland) Inter Europol Competition	(France) Philippe Bourgois (United Kingdom) Simon Phillips	Ligier JS P3	M	11	+2:00.764
29	LMP3	13	(Poland) Inter Europol Competition	(France) Philippe Bourgois (United Kingdom) Simon Phillips	Nissan 5.0 L V8	M	11	+2:00.764
30	LMP3	22	(United States) United Autosports	(United Kingdom) Matthew Bell (United States) Jim McGuire	Ligier JS P3	M	11	+2:10.836
30	LMP3	22	(United States) United Autosports	(United Kingdom) Matthew Bell (United States) Jim McGuire	Nissan 5.0 L V8	M	11	+2:10.836
31	LMP3	18	(United Kingdom) Nielsen Racing	(United Kingdom) James Littlejohn (Japan) Nobuya Yamanaka	Ligier JS P3	M	11	+2:17.831
31	LMP3	18	(United Kingdom) Nielsen Racing	(United Kingdom) James Littlejohn (Japan) Nobuya Yamanaka	Nissan 5.0 L V8	M	11	+2:17.831
32	LMP3	43	(Denmark) Keo Racing	(Sweden) Joakim Frid (Denmark) Michael Markussen	Ligier JS P3	M	11	+2:18.958
32	LMP3	43	(Denmark) Keo Racing	(Sweden) Joakim Frid (Denmark) Michael Markussen	Nissan 5.0 L V8	M	11	+2:18.958
33	LMP3	90	(Austria) AT Racing	(Belarus) Alexander Talkanitsa Jr. (Belarus) Alexander Talkanitsa Sr.	Ligier JS P3	M	11	+2:19.065
33	LMP3	90	(Austria) AT Racing	(Belarus) Alexander Talkanitsa Jr. (Belarus) Alexander Talkanitsa Sr.	Nissan 5.0 L V8	M	11	+2:19.065
34	LMP3	60	(Spain) CD Sport	(United Kingdom) Nick Adcock (Denmark) Michael Jensen	Norma M30	M	11	+2:27.225
34	LMP3	60	(Spain) CD Sport	(United Kingdom) Nick Adcock (Denmark) Michael Jensen	Nissan 5.0 L V8	M	11	+2:27.225
35	GT3	7	(Italy) Scuderia Villorba Corse	(Switzerland) Mauro Calamia (Italy) Roberto Pampanini	Mercedes-AMG GT3	M	11	+3:36.424
35	GT3	7	(Italy) Scuderia Villorba Corse	(Switzerland) Mauro Calamia (Italy) Roberto Pampanini	Mercedes-AMG M159 6.2 L V8	M	11	+3:36.424
36	LMP3	29	(Luxembourg) DKR Engineering	(Netherlands) Bob Herber (Netherlands) Rob Kamphues	Norma M30	M	11	+3:36.456
36	LMP3	29	(Luxembourg) DKR Engineering	(Netherlands) Bob Herber (Netherlands) Rob Kamphues	Nissan 5.0 L V8	M	11	+3:36.456
37	GT3	50	(Switzerland) Kessel Racing	(United Kingdom) Oliver Hancock (United Kingdom) John Hartshorne	Ferrari 488 GT3	M	11	+3:47.295
37	GT3	50	(Switzerland) Kessel Racing	(United Kingdom) Oliver Hancock (United Kingdom) John Hartshorne	Ferrari F154CB 3.9 L Turbo V8	M	11	+3:47.295
38	LMP3	65	(Malaysia) Viper Niza Racing	(Malaysia) Dominic Ang (Malaysia) Douglas Khoo	Ligier JS P3	M	11	+3:57.752
38	LMP3	65	(Malaysia) Viper Niza Racing	(Malaysia) Dominic Ang (Malaysia) Douglas Khoo	Nissan 5.0 L V8	M	11	+3:57.752
39	INV	84	(France) SRT41 - Frédéric Sausset	(Japan) Takuma Aoki (Belgium) Nigel Bailly (France) Snoussi Ben Moussa	Ligier JS P3	M	11	+4:09.517
39	INV	84	(France) SRT41 - Frédéric Sausset	(Japan) Takuma Aoki (Belgium) Nigel Bailly (France) Snoussi Ben Moussa	Nissan 5.0 L V8	M	11	+4:09.517
40	LMP3	74	(Switzerland) Cool Racing	(France) Victor Blugeon (United States) Maurice Smith	Ligier JS P3	M	10	+1 Lap
40	LMP3	74	(Switzerland) Cool Racing	(France) Victor Blugeon (United States) Maurice Smith	Nissan 5.0 L V8	M	10	+1 Lap
41	GT3	95	(South Africa) Bentley Team Africa Le Mans	(Netherlands) Jan Lammers (South Africa) Greg Mills	Bentley Continental GT3	M	10	+1 Lap
41	GT3	95	(South Africa) Bentley Team Africa Le Mans	(Netherlands) Jan Lammers (South Africa) Greg Mills	Bentley 4.0 L Turbo V8	M	10	+1 Lap
42	LMP3	11	(Luxembourg) Racing Experience	(Luxembourg) Gary Hauser (France) Nicolas Mélin	Norma M30	M	10	+1 Lap
42	LMP3	11	(Luxembourg) Racing Experience	(Luxembourg) Gary Hauser (France) Nicolas Mélin	Nissan 5.0 L V8	M	10	+1 Lap
43	LMP3	4	(Switzerland) Cool Racing	(France) Nicolas Rondet (United States) John Schauerman	Ligier JS P3	M	10	+1 Lap
43	LMP3	4	(Switzerland) Cool Racing	(France) Nicolas Rondet (United States) John Schauerman	Nissan 5.0 L V8	M	10	+1 Lap
44	GT3	35	(Italy) Krypton Motorsport	(Italy) Stefano Pezzucchi (Italy) Marco Zanuttini	Mercedes-AMG GT3	M	8	+3 Laps
44	GT3	35	(Italy) Krypton Motorsport	(Italy) Stefano Pezzucchi (Italy) Marco Zanuttini	Mercedes-AMG M159 6.2 L V8	M	8	+3 Laps
45	GT3	52	(Switzerland) Spirit of Race	(Brazil) Oswaldo Negri Jr. (Puerto Rico) Francesco Piovanetti	Ferrari 488 GT3	M	6	Did not finish
45	GT3	52	(Switzerland) Spirit of Race	(Brazil) Oswaldo Negri Jr. (Puerto Rico) Francesco Piovanetti	Ferrari F154CB 3.9 L Turbo V8	M	6	Did not finish
46	LMP3	14	(United Kingdom) RLR Msport	(United Kingdom) Mark Mayall (Denmark) Christian Olsen	Ligier JS P3	M	4	Did not finish
46	LMP3	14	(United Kingdom) RLR Msport	(United Kingdom) Mark Mayall (Denmark) Christian Olsen	Nissan 5.0 L V8	M	4	Did not finish
47	LMP3	9	(France) Graff	(France) Adrien Trouillet (France) Eric Trouillet	Ligier JS P3	M	2	Did not finish
47	LMP3	9	(France) Graff	(France) Adrien Trouillet (France) Eric Trouillet	Nissan 5.0 L V8	M	2	Did not finish
48	LMP3	69	(Italy) Monza Garage	(France) Marc-Antoine Dannielou (France) Alexandre Yvon	Ligier JS P3	M	2	Did not finish
48	LMP3	69	(Italy) Monza Garage	(France) Marc-Antoine Dannielou (France) Alexandre Yvon	Nissan 5.0 L V8	M	2	Did not finish
49	GT3	99	(United Kingdom) Beechdean AMR	(United Kingdom) Ross Gunn (United Kingdom) Andrew Howard	Aston Martin Vantage AMR GT3	M	10	Disqualified
49	GT3	99	(United Kingdom) Beechdean AMR	(United Kingdom) Ross Gunn (United Kingdom) Andrew Howard	Aston Martin 4.0 L Turbo V8	M	10	Disqualified

=== Race two ===
The second 55-minute race commenced at 11:30 local time on 15 June. It was held in dry weather conditions ranging from 17.62 and 19.2 °C (63.72 and 66.56 °F) and a track temperature between 20 to 20.57 °C (68.00 to 69.03 °F). 49 cars were due to take the start, but the No. 74 Cool Racing and No. 62 Kessel entries did not start for unknown reasons. At the start of the race, Kirmann overtook the pole sitting No. 25 Lanan car of Benham at turn one for the race lead. Hunt ran across the gravel trap the Dunlop Curve and went straight across the first chicane across the front of the pack. He returned to the circuit without suffering from a collision. Further back, the GT3 pole sitting No. 8 Kessel Ferrari of Piccini held the class lead for the first lap until Piccini was passed by Lavergne's No. 71 Luzich Ferrari on lap two. That same lap saw the No. 30 CD Sport car of Kevin Bole-Besançon overtake Benham for second.

At the beginning of lap three, Bole-Besançon became the race leader when Kirmann and Benham went off the track at the exit to the forest esses and hitting the barriers side-on at Tertre Rouge corner, resulting in Kirmann and Benham batting each other until a slow zone between the first two chicanes. Hunt passed Chila for fourth overall as Lavergne led GT3 from Pianezzola and Pierburg. Bole-Besançon increased his lead over the rest of the field to eight seconds by the time of the mandatory pit stops. The No. 30 CD Sport team were the last to make a compulsory pit stop, while Kirmann and Benham made their stops immediately. Following the pit stops, Jacques Wolff had relieved Bole-Besançon and continued to hold the No. 30 CD Sport car's lead while GT3 continued to be led by Mac's No. 71 Luzich Ferrari from Onslow-Cole's No. 40 SPS Mercedes. Wolff was not as fast as his co-driver, as Hörr overtook Tappy on the outside of the banked Indianapolis corner for second.

Hörr then caught and passed Wolff at Tertre Rouge corner for the race lead on lap nine. At the entry to the second chicane, Tappy overtook Wolff for second place on the same lap. Gunn overtook Piccini for third in GT3 while Onslow-Cole closed up to class leader Mac. The No. 30 CD Sport entry was imposed a six-second stop-and-go-penalty because its pit stop was faster than the mandated two minutes, promoting the No. 39 Graff vehicle of Schatz to third. A slow zone was imposed for the sister No. 60 CD entry of Nick Adcock who spun at the first chicane, resulting in the car stalling. A Slow Zone was enforced to allow a tractor to extricate Adcock's stricken car. With six minutes remaining, Onslow-Cole ran straight across the Dunlop chicane, moving Gunn to second in GT3. On the final lap, Wolff spun at Tertre Rouge corner, delaying Gunn who had caught up to Mac. Hörr maintained the lead for the rest of the race to secure himself and Kirmann the overall victory, putting them and DKR eight points behind Benham and Tappy and Lanan Racing in the LMP3 Drivers' and Teams' standings. The Lanan duo of Benham and Tappy finished 4.876 seconds behind in second after Tappy was unable to keep up with Hörr's pace. The Graff team of Chila and Schatz completed the podium positions in third. Luzich's Lavergne and Mac completed a clean sweep of GT3 class victories at Le Mans for the team's third win of the season, 1.272 seconds ahead of the No. 99 Beechdean Aston Martin, putting Luzich and their drivers into the lead of both the GT3 Drivers' and Teams' Championships. The No. 40 SPS Mercedes was another six seconds behind in third.

==== Race two classification ====
Winners in each class are denoted in bold and ‡

Final classification of the second race
Pos	Class	No.	Team	Drivers	Chassis	Tyre	Laps	Time/Reason
Pos	Class	No.	Team	Drivers	Engine	Tyre	Laps	Time/Reason
1	**LMP3**	**3**	**(Luxembourg) DKR Engineering**	**(Germany) Laurents Hörr (France) François Kirmann**	**Norma M30**	M	**14**	**58:39.654‡**
1	**LMP3**	**3**	**(Luxembourg) DKR Engineering**	**(Germany) Laurents Hörr (France) François Kirmann**	**Nissan 5.0 L V8**	M	**14**	**58:39.654‡**
2	LMP3	25	(United Kingdom) Lanan Racing	(United Kingdom) Michael Benham (United Kingdom) Duncan Tappy	Norma M30	M	14	+4.876
2	LMP3	25	(United Kingdom) Lanan Racing	(United Kingdom) Michael Benham (United Kingdom) Duncan Tappy	Nissan 5.0 L V8	M	14	+4.876
3	LMP3	39	(France) Graff	(France) Adrien Chila (France) Nicolas Schatz	Norma M30	M	14	+28.286
3	LMP3	39	(France) Graff	(France) Adrien Chila (France) Nicolas Schatz	Nissan 5.0 L V8	M	14	+28.286
4	LMP3	19	(France) M Racing	(France) Yann Ehrlacher (France) Laurent Millara	Norma M30	M	14	+38.650
4	LMP3	19	(France) M Racing	(France) Yann Ehrlacher (France) Laurent Millara	Nissan 5.0 L V8	M	14	+38.650
5	LMP3	2	(United Kingdom) Nielsen Racing	(United Kingdom) Colin Noble (United Kingdom) Anthony Wells	Norma M30	M	14	+47.530
5	LMP3	2	(United Kingdom) Nielsen Racing	(United Kingdom) Colin Noble (United Kingdom) Anthony Wells	Nissan 5.0 L V8	M	14	+47.530
6	LMP3	22	(United States) United Autosports	(United Kingdom) Matthew Bell (United States) Jim McGuire	Ligier JS P3	M	14	+51.878
6	LMP3	22	(United States) United Autosports	(United Kingdom) Matthew Bell (United States) Jim McGuire	Nissan 5.0 L V8	M	14	+51.878
7	LMP3	24	(United States) United Autosports	(United Kingdom) Wayne Boyd (United States) Najaf Husain	Ligier JS P3	M	14	+1:01.096
7	LMP3	24	(United States) United Autosports	(United Kingdom) Wayne Boyd (United States) Najaf Husain	Nissan 5.0 L V8	M	14	+1:01.096
8	LMP3	15	(United Kingdom) RLR Msport	(United Kingdom) Freddie Hunt (Denmark) Martin Vedel Mortensen	Ligier JS P3	M	14	+1:14.109
8	LMP3	15	(United Kingdom) RLR Msport	(United Kingdom) Freddie Hunt (Denmark) Martin Vedel Mortensen	Nissan 5.0 L V8	M	14	+1:14.109
9	LMP3	23	(United States) United Autosports	(Canada) Garett Grist (United States) Rob Hodes	Ligier JS P3	M	14	+1:14.384
9	LMP3	23	(United States) United Autosports	(Canada) Garett Grist (United States) Rob Hodes	Nissan 5.0 L V8	M	14	+1:14.384
10	LMP3	72	(France) Graff	(France) Natan Bihel (France) Cyril Denis	Norma M30	M	14	+1:15.364
10	LMP3	72	(France) Graff	(France) Natan Bihel (France) Cyril Denis	Nissan 5.0 L V8	M	14	+1:15.364
11	LMP3	9	(France) Graff	(France) Adrien Trouillet (France) Eric Trouillet	Ligier JS P3	M	14	+1:15.817
11	LMP3	9	(France) Graff	(France) Adrien Trouillet (France) Eric Trouillet	Nissan 5.0 L V8	M	14	+1:15.817
12	LMP3	4	(Switzerland) Cool Racing	(France) Nicolas Rondet (United States) John Schauerman	Ligier JS P3	M	14	+1:18.489
12	LMP3	4	(Switzerland) Cool Racing	(France) Nicolas Rondet (United States) John Schauerman	Nissan 5.0 L V8	M	14	+1:18.489
13	LMP3	91	(France) Graff	(Liechtenstein) Matthias Kaiser (Switzerland) Sebastien Page	Ligier JS P3	M	14	+1:22.883
13	LMP3	91	(France) Graff	(Liechtenstein) Matthias Kaiser (Switzerland) Sebastien Page	Nissan 5.0 L V8	M	14	+1:22.883
14	**GT3**	**71**	**(United States) Luzich Racing**	**(France) Fabien Lavergne (Denmark) Mikkel Mac**	**Ferrari 488 GT3**	M	**14**	**+1:25.250‡**
14	**GT3**	**71**	**(United States) Luzich Racing**	**(France) Fabien Lavergne (Denmark) Mikkel Mac**	**Ferrari F154CB 3.9 L Turbo V8**	M	**14**	**+1:25.250‡**
15	GT3	99	(United Kingdom) Beechdean AMR	(United Kingdom) Ross Gunn (United Kingdom) Andrew Howard	Aston Martin Vantage AMR GT3	M	14	+1:26.522
15	GT3	99	(United Kingdom) Beechdean AMR	(United Kingdom) Ross Gunn (United Kingdom) Andrew Howard	Aston Martin 4.0 L Turbo V8	M	14	+1:26.522
16	GT3	40	(Germany) SPS Automotive Performance	(United Kingdom) Tom Onslow-Cole (Germany) Valentin Pierburg	Mercedes-AMG GT3	M	14	+1:32.631
16	GT3	40	(Germany) SPS Automotive Performance	(United Kingdom) Tom Onslow-Cole (Germany) Valentin Pierburg	Mercedes-AMG M159 6.2 L V8	M	14	+1:32.631
17	GT3	8	(Switzerland) Kessel Racing	(Italy) Sergio Pianezzola (Italy) Giacomo Piccini	Ferrari 488 GT3	M	14	+1:33.747
17	GT3	8	(Switzerland) Kessel Racing	(Italy) Sergio Pianezzola (Italy) Giacomo Piccini	Ferrari F154CB 3.9 L Turbo V8	M	14	+1:33.747
18	LMP3	18	(United Kingdom) Nielsen Racing	(United Kingdom) James Littlejohn (Japan) Nobuya Yamanaka	Ligier JS P3	M	14	+1:54.719
18	LMP3	18	(United Kingdom) Nielsen Racing	(United Kingdom) James Littlejohn (Japan) Nobuya Yamanaka	Nissan 5.0 L V8	M	14	+1:54.719
19	GT3	51	(Switzerland) Spirit of Race	(Italy) Maurizio Mediani (Switzerland) Christoph Ulrich	Ferrari 488 GT3	M	14	+1:57.936
19	GT3	51	(Switzerland) Spirit of Race	(Italy) Maurizio Mediani (Switzerland) Christoph Ulrich	Ferrari F154CB 3.9 L Turbo V8	M	14	+1:57.936
20	GT3	97	(United Kingdom) TF Sport	(United Kingdom) Tom Gamble (United Kingdom) Flick Haigh	Aston Martin Vantage AMR GT3	M	14	+2:12.098
20	GT3	97	(United Kingdom) TF Sport	(United Kingdom) Tom Gamble (United Kingdom) Flick Haigh	Aston Martin 4.0 L Turbo V8	M	14	+2:12.098
21	GT3	54	(Germany) SPS Automotive Performance	(Switzerland) Yannick Mettler (Switzerland) Dexter Müller	Mercedes-AMG GT3	M	14	+2:14.950
21	GT3	54	(Germany) SPS Automotive Performance	(Switzerland) Yannick Mettler (Switzerland) Dexter Müller	Mercedes-AMG M159 6.2 L V8	M	14	+2:14.950
22	LMP3	55	(Switzerland) Spirit of Race	(Italy) Michele Rugolo (Germany) Claudio Sdanewitsch	Ligier JS P3	M	14	+2:27.939
22	LMP3	55	(Switzerland) Spirit of Race	(Italy) Michele Rugolo (Germany) Claudio Sdanewitsch	Nissan 5.0 L V8	M	14	+2:27.939
23	LMP3	96	(Switzerland) Cool Racing	(France) Romain Carton (France) Alexandre Coigny	Ligier JS P3	M	14	+2:28.837
23	LMP3	96	(Switzerland) Cool Racing	(France) Romain Carton (France) Alexandre Coigny	Nissan 5.0 L V8	M	14	+2:28.837
24	GT3	88	(Italy) Ebimotors	(Italy) Alessandro Baccani (Italy) Paolo Venerosi	Porsche 911 GT3 R	M	14	+3:21.470
24	GT3	88	(Italy) Ebimotors	(Italy) Alessandro Baccani (Italy) Paolo Venerosi	Porsche 4.0 L Flat-6	M	14	+3:21.470
25	GT3	83	(Italy) Scuderia Villorba Corse	(France) Steeve Hiesse (France) Cédric Mézard	Lamborghini Huracán GT3	M	14	+3:21.887
25	GT3	83	(Italy) Scuderia Villorba Corse	(France) Steeve Hiesse (France) Cédric Mézard	Lamborghini 5.2 L V10	M	14	+3:21.887
26	GT3	53	(Switzerland) Spirit of Race	(Portugal) Rui Águas (Greece) Kriton Lendoudis	Ferrari 488 GT3	M	14	+3:31.582
26	GT3	53	(Switzerland) Spirit of Race	(Portugal) Rui Águas (Greece) Kriton Lendoudis	Ferrari F154CB 3.9 L Turbo V8	M	14	+3:31.582
27	LMP3	29	(Luxembourg) DKR Engineering	(Netherlands) Bob Herber (Netherlands) Rob Kamphues	Norma M30	M	14	+3:36.231
27	LMP3	29	(Luxembourg) DKR Engineering	(Netherlands) Bob Herber (Netherlands) Rob Kamphues	Nissan 5.0 L V8	M	14	+3:36.231
28	GT3	35	(Italy) Krypton Motorsport	(Italy) Stefano Pezzucchi (Italy) Marco Zanuttini	Mercedes-AMG GT3	M	14	+3:39.782
28	GT3	35	(Italy) Krypton Motorsport	(Italy) Stefano Pezzucchi (Italy) Marco Zanuttini	Mercedes-AMG M159 6.2 L V8	M	14	+3:39.782
29	LMP3	65	(Malaysia) Viper Niza Racing	(Malaysia) Dominic Ang (Malaysia) Douglas Khoo	Ligier JS P3	M	14	+3:51.643
29	LMP3	65	(Malaysia) Viper Niza Racing	(Malaysia) Dominic Ang (Malaysia) Douglas Khoo	Nissan 5.0 L V8	M	14	+3:51.643
30	GT3	52	(Switzerland) Spirit of Race	(Brazil) Oswaldo Negri Jr. (Puerto Rico) Francesco Piovanetti	Ferrari 488 GT3	M	14	+3:56.042
30	GT3	52	(Switzerland) Spirit of Race	(Brazil) Oswaldo Negri Jr. (Puerto Rico) Francesco Piovanetti	Ferrari F154CB 3.9 L Turbo V8	M	14	+3:56.042
31	LMP3	90	(Austria) AT Racing	(Belarus) Alexander Talkanitsa Jr. (Belarus) Alexander Talkanitsa Sr.	Ligier JS P3	M	14	+4:06.405
31	LMP3	90	(Austria) AT Racing	(Belarus) Alexander Talkanitsa Jr. (Belarus) Alexander Talkanitsa Sr.	Nissan 5.0 L V8	M	14	+4:06.405
32	LMP3	69	(Italy) Monza Garage	(France) Marc-Antoine Dannielou (France) Alexandre Yvon	Ligier JS P3	M	14	+5:18.930
32	LMP3	69	(Italy) Monza Garage	(France) Marc-Antoine Dannielou (France) Alexandre Yvon	Nissan 5.0 L V8	M	14	+5:18.930
33	LMP3	30	(Spain) CD Sport	(France) Kevin Bole-Besançon (France) Jacques Wolff	Norma M30	M	13	+1 Lap
33	LMP3	30	(Spain) CD Sport	(France) Kevin Bole-Besançon (France) Jacques Wolff	Nissan 5.0 L V8	M	13	+1 Lap
34	LMP3	43	(Denmark) Keo Racing	(Sweden) Joakim Frid (Denmark) Michael Markussen	Ligier JS P3	M	13	+1 Lap
34	LMP3	43	(Denmark) Keo Racing	(Sweden) Joakim Frid (Denmark) Michael Markussen	Nissan 5.0 L V8	M	13	+1 Lap
35	LMP3	17	(United Kingdom) Nielsen Racing	(United Kingdom) Ivor Dunbar (United Kingdom) Bonamy Grimes	Norma M30	M	13	+1 Lap
35	LMP3	17	(United Kingdom) Nielsen Racing	(United Kingdom) Ivor Dunbar (United Kingdom) Bonamy Grimes	Nissan 5.0 L V8	M	13	+1 Lap
36	GT3	82	(Switzerland) Kessel Racing	(Germany) Pierre Kaffer (United States) Pierre Mulacek	Ferrari 488 GT3	M	13	+1 Lap
36	GT3	82	(Switzerland) Kessel Racing	(Germany) Pierre Kaffer (United States) Pierre Mulacek	Ferrari F154CB 3.9 L Turbo V8	M	13	+1 Lap
37	LMP3	14	(United Kingdom) RLR Msport	(United Kingdom) Mark Mayall (Denmark) Christian Olsen	Ligier JS P3	M	13	+1 Lap
37	LMP3	14	(United Kingdom) RLR Msport	(United Kingdom) Mark Mayall (Denmark) Christian Olsen	Nissan 5.0 L V8	M	13	+1 Lap
38	GT3	50	(Switzerland) Kessel Racing	(United Kingdom) Oliver Hancock (United Kingdom) John Hartshorne	Ferrari 488 GT3	M	13	+1 Lap
38	GT3	50	(Switzerland) Kessel Racing	(United Kingdom) Oliver Hancock (United Kingdom) John Hartshorne	Ferrari F154CB 3.9 L Turbo V8	M	13	+1 Lap
39	INV	84	(France) SRT41 - Frédéric Sausset	(Japan) Takuma Aoki (Belgium) Nigel Bailly (France) Snoussi Ben Moussa	Ligier JS P3	M	13	+1 Lap
39	INV	84	(France) SRT41 - Frédéric Sausset	(Japan) Takuma Aoki (Belgium) Nigel Bailly (France) Snoussi Ben Moussa	Nissan 5.0 L V8	M	13	+1 Lap
40	GT3	7	(Italy) Scuderia Villorba Corse	(Switzerland) Mauro Calamia (Italy) Roberto Pampanini	Mercedes-AMG GT3	M	13	+1 Lap
40	GT3	7	(Italy) Scuderia Villorba Corse	(Switzerland) Mauro Calamia (Italy) Roberto Pampanini	Mercedes-AMG M159 6.2 L V8	M	13	+1 Lap
41	GT3	95	(South Africa) Bentley Team Africa Le Mans	(Netherlands) Jan Lammers (South Africa) Greg Mills	Bentley Continental GT3	M	13	+1 Lap
41	GT3	95	(South Africa) Bentley Team Africa Le Mans	(Netherlands) Jan Lammers (South Africa) Greg Mills	Bentley 4.0 L Turbo V8	M	13	+1 Lap
42	LMP3	27	(United States) United Autosports	(France) Patrice Lafargue (France) Erik Maris	Ligier JS P3	M	12	+2 Laps
42	LMP3	27	(United States) United Autosports	(France) Patrice Lafargue (France) Erik Maris	Nissan 5.0 L V8	M	12	+2 Laps
43	LMP3	13	(Poland) Inter Europol Competition	(France) Philippe Bourgois (United Kingdom) Simon Phillips	Ligier JS P3	M	12	+2 Laps
43	LMP3	13	(Poland) Inter Europol Competition	(France) Philippe Bourgois (United Kingdom) Simon Phillips	Nissan 5.0 L V8	M	12	+2 Laps
44	LMP3	20	(United Kingdom) Grainmarket Racing	(United Kingdom) Mark Crader (United Kingdom) Alex Mortimer	Norma M30	M	11	+3 Laps
44	LMP3	20	(United Kingdom) Grainmarket Racing	(United Kingdom) Mark Crader (United Kingdom) Alex Mortimer	Nissan 5.0 L V8	M	11	+3 Laps
45	LMP3	60	(Spain) CD Sport	(United Kingdom) Nick Adcock (Denmark) Michael Jensen	Norma M30	M	9	+5 Laps
45	LMP3	60	(Spain) CD Sport	(United Kingdom) Nick Adcock (Denmark) Michael Jensen	Nissan 5.0 L V8	M	9	+5 Laps
46	LMP3	5	(Luxembourg) DKR Engineering	(Italy) Marco Cencetti (Switzerland) Marcello Marateotto	Norma M30	M	1	Did not finish
46	LMP3	5	(Luxembourg) DKR Engineering	(Italy) Marco Cencetti (Switzerland) Marcello Marateotto	Nissan 5.0 L V8	M	1	Did not finish
47	LMP3	11	(Luxembourg) Racing Experience	(Luxembourg) Gary Hauser (France) Nicolas Mélin	Norma M30	M	1	Did not finish
47	LMP3	11	(Luxembourg) Racing Experience	(Luxembourg) Gary Hauser (France) Nicolas Mélin	Nissan 5.0 L V8	M	1	Did not finish
48	LMP3	74	(Switzerland) Cool Racing	(France) Victor Blugeon (United States) Maurice Smith	Ligier JS P3	M	—	Did not start
48	LMP3	74	(Switzerland) Cool Racing	(France) Victor Blugeon (United States) Maurice Smith	Nissan 5.0 L V8	M	—	Did not start
49	GT3	62	(Switzerland) Kessel Racing	(United States) Anthony Lazzaro (United States) Philippe Mulacek	Ferrari 488 GT3	M	—	Did not start
49	GT3	62	(Switzerland) Kessel Racing	(United States) Anthony Lazzaro (United States) Philippe Mulacek	Ferrari F154CB 3.9 L Turbo V8	M	—	Did not start

== Championship standings after the race ==
- Note: Only the top five positions are included for the Drivers' and Teams' Championship standings.

LMP3 Drivers' Championship standings
Pos.	+/–	Driver	Points
1		(United Kingdom) Michael Benham (United Kingdom) Duncan Tappy	66
2		(Germany) Laurents Hörr (France) François Kirmann	58
3		(United Kingdom) Colin Noble (United Kingdom) Anthony Wells	43
4	5	(France) Adrien Chila (France) Nicolas Schatz	30.5
5	1	(Italy) Marco Cencetti (Switzerland) Marcello Marateotto	23

LMP3 Teams' Championship standings
Pos.	+/–	No.	Constructor	Points
1		25	(United Kingdom) Lanan Racing	66
2		3	(Luxembourg) DKR Engineering	58
3		2	(United Kingdom) Nielsen Racing	43
4	5	39	(United Kingdom) Graff	30.5
5	1	5	(Luxembourg) DKR Engineering	23

GT3 Drivers' Championship standings
Pos.	+/–	Driver	Points
1	1	(France) Fabien Lavergne (Denmark) Mikkel Mac	72
2	1	(Italy) Sergio Pianezzola (Italy) Giacomo Piccini	55
3	1	(Italy) Maurizio Mediani (Switzerland) Christoph Ulrich	36
4	1	(United Kingdom) Andrew Howard (Italy) Ross Gunn	32
5		(Switzerland) Yannick Mettler (Switzerland) Dexter Müller	29

GT3 Teams' Championship standings
Pos.	+/–	No.	Constructor	Points
1	1	71	(United States) Luzich Racing	72
2	1	8	(Switzerland) Kessel Racing	55
3	1	51	(Switzerland) Spirit of Race	36
4	1	99	(United Kingdom) Beechdean AMR	32
5		54	(Germany) SPS Automotive Performance	29
