= Fabien Lavergne =

French racing driver (born 1985)

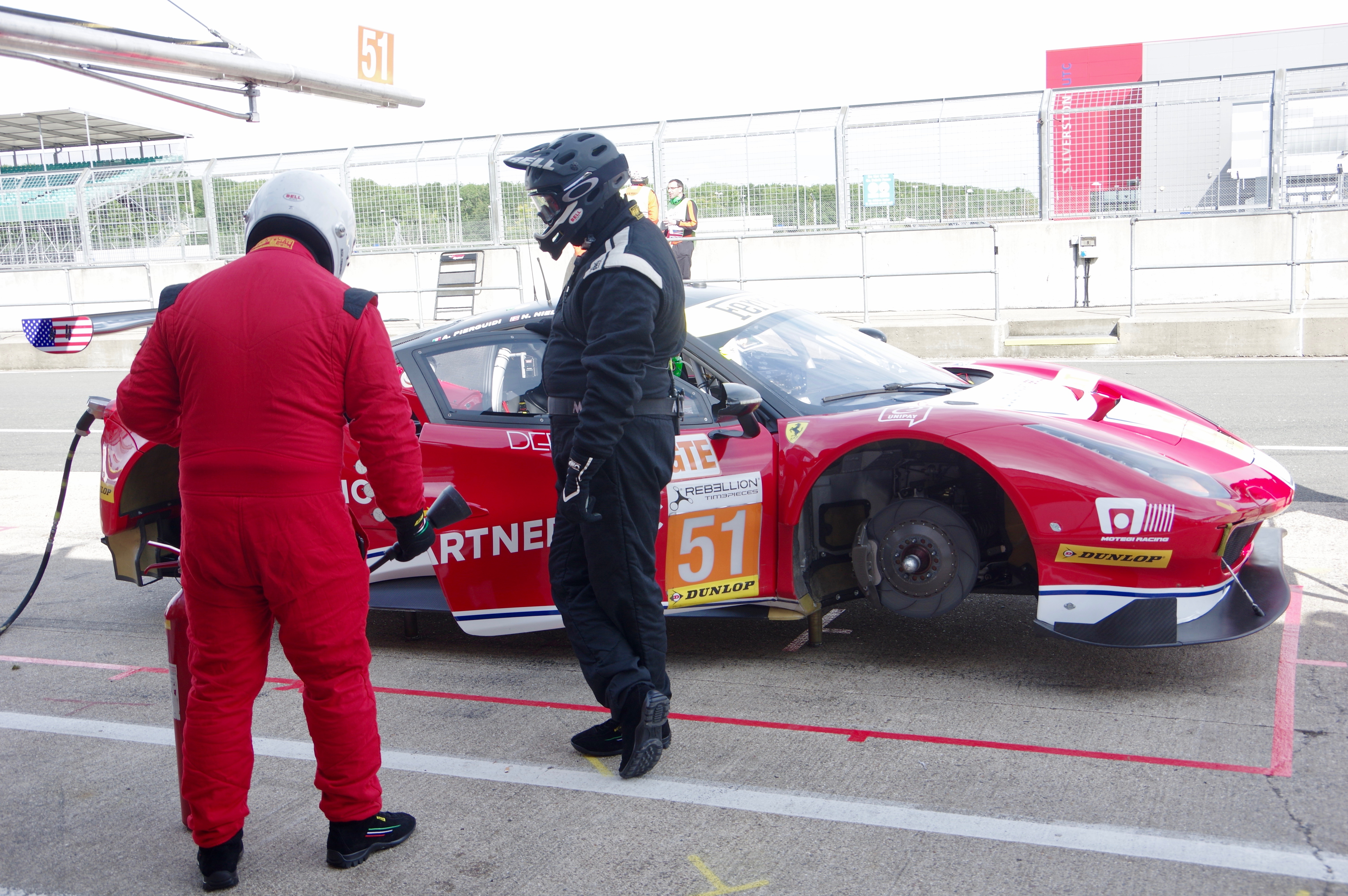
- Lavergne's 2019 ELMS title-winning Ferrari.
- Nationality: (France) French
- Born: 25 October 1985 (age 41) Marmande, France

Le Mans Cup career
- Debut season: 2018
- Current team: R-ace GP
- Categorisation: FIA Bronze (2018–2019); FIA Silver (2020–)
- Car number: 88
- Starts: 18 (18 entries)
- Wins: 3
- Podiums: 6
- Poles: 5
- Fastest laps: 1
- Best finish: 2nd (LMP3) in 2019

Championship titles
- 2019: ELMS - LMGTE

Fabien Lavergne (born 25 October 1985) is a French racing driver and manager. He is the 2019 European Le Mans Series LMGTE champion, a multi-race winner in LMP3, and a sporting director at Duqueine and R-ace GP.

Lavergne started his career in karting, where he won the regional Aquitaine championship seven times in 15 years. In 2013, Lavergne competed in the French Legends car championship, before competing in the French single-seater series with a Formula Renault car from the 2000s, winning six races in two years and finishing second in the standings both times.

After winning the Mitjet 2L series in 2017, Lavergne migrated into sportscar racing the following year, competing in various LMP3 series. He soon attained success, winning the 2019 European Le Mans Series in the LMGTE class in a Ferrari 488 GTE Evo alongside Alessandro Pier Guidi and Nicklas Nielsen. That year he also dominated both races of the 2019 Road to Le Mans event, which helped him towards second place in the GT3 class of the Michelin Le Mans Cup.

After being upgraded from FIA Bronze to Silver at the start of 2020, Lavergne finished second in the French GT4 Cup. He later returned to LMP3 prototype racing on a full-time basis, and racked up multiple wins on his way to runner-up in the Asian Le Mans Series in both 2023 and 2024.

Lavergne is a director at MV2S Racing and coach at Nicolas Todt's All Road Management; he previously worked as a commercial advisor for AMC Renault, BMW, and Mercedes-Benz France. In 2026, Lavergne joined Duqueine and R-ace GP as team manager in LMP2 and LMP3.

== Racing record ==
=== Racing career summary ===
Season	Series	Team	Races	Wins	Poles	F/Laps	Podiums	Points	Position
2018	European Le Mans Series - LMP3	DKR Engineering	1	0	0	0	0	0.5	37th
2018	Le Mans Cup - LMP3	CD Sport	2	0	2	0	0	21	14th
2018	V de V Endurance Series - LMP3	CD Sport	1	0	0	1	0	0	NC†
2019	European Le Mans Series - LMGTE	Luzich Racing	6	4	1	0	5	127	**1st**
2019	Le Mans Cup - GT3	Luzich Racing	7	3	3	1	5	109	**2nd**
2019	French GT4 Cup - Pro-Am	Schatz Lestienne Racing	2	0	0	0	0	0	NC†
2020	French GT4 Cup - Silver	CD Sport	12	3	1	3	7	191	**2nd**
2020	Le Mans Cup - LMP3	MV2S Racing	4	0	0	0	0	2	31st
2021	European Le Mans Series - LMP3	MV2S Racing	6	0	0	0	0	14.5	20th
2021	GT World Challenge Europe Sprint Cup	Attempto Racing	2	0	0	0	0	0	NC
2021	GT World Challenge Europe Endurance Cup	Attempto Racing	1	0	0	0	0	0	NC
2021	GT World Challenge Europe Endurance Cup - Silver	Attempto Racing	1	0	0	0	0	20	23rd
2022	French GT4 Cup - Silver	CD Sport	2	0	0	0	0	0	NC†
2023	Asian Le Mans Series - LMP3	MV2S Racing	4	1	0	0	4	73	**2nd**
2023–24	Asian Le Mans Series - LMP3	CD Sport	5	2	0	1	5	101	**2nd**
2025	Le Mans Cup - LMP3	R-ace GP	5	0	0	0	1	28	11th

^{†} As Lavergne was a guest driver, he was ineligible to score points.

=== Complete European Le Mans Series results ===
(key) (Races in bold indicate pole position; results in italics indicate fastest lap)

Year	Entrant	Class	Chassis	Engine	1	2	3	4	5	6	Rank	Points
2018	DKR Engineering	LMP3	Norma M30	Nissan VK50VE 5.0 L V8	LEC	MNZ	RBR; 14	SIL	SPA	ALG	37th	0.5
2019	Luzich Racing	LMGTE	Ferrari 488 GTE	Ferrari F154CB	LEC; 1	MNZ; 3					1st	127
2019	Luzich Racing	LMGTE	Ferrari 488 GTE Evo	Ferrari F154CB			CAT; 1	SIL; 4	SPA; 1	ALG; 1	1st	127
2021	MV2S Racing	LMP3	Ligier JS P320	Nissan VK56DE 5.6L V8	CAT; NC	RBR; 7	LEC; 11	MNZ; 6	SPA; NC	ALG; NC	20th	14.5

=== Complete Le Mans Cup results ===
(key) (Races in bold indicate pole position; results in italics indicate fastest lap)

Year	Entrant	Class	Chassis	1	2	3	4	5	6	7	Rank	Points
2018	CD Sport	LMP3	Norma M30	LEC	MNZ	LMS; 1	LMS; 2	**RBR**; 5	SPA	ALG; 5	14th	21
2019	Luzich Racing	GT3	Ferrari 488 GT3	**LEC**; 3	MNZ; 1	LMS; 1; 1	**LMS**; **2**; 1	CAT; 3	**SPA**; 6	**ALG**; 4	2nd	109
2020	MV2S Racing	LMP3	Ligier JS P320	RIC	SPA; 10	LEC; 12	LMS; 1	LMS; 2	MNZ; 11	ALG; Ret	31st	2
2025	R-ace GP	LMP3 Pro-Am	Duqueine D09	CAT; 6	LEC; 6	LMS; 1; 8	LMS; 2; 3	SPA; Ret	SIL	ALG	11th	28

=== Complete Asian Le Mans Series results ===
(key) (Races in bold indicate pole position) (Races in italics indicate fastest lap)

Year	Team	Class	Car	Engine	1	2	3	4	5	Pos.	Points
2023	MV2S Racing	LMP3	Ligier JS P320	Nissan VK56DE 5.6L V8	DUB; 1; 1	DUB; 2; 3	ABU; 1; 2	ABU; 2; 3		2nd	73
2023–24	CD Sport	LMP3	Ligier JS P320	Nissan VK56DE 5.6 L V8	SEP; 1; 2	**SEP**; **2**; 1	DUB; 2	ABU; 1; 1	ABU; 2; 3	2nd	101
