= Frédéric Sausset =

French racing driver (born 1969)

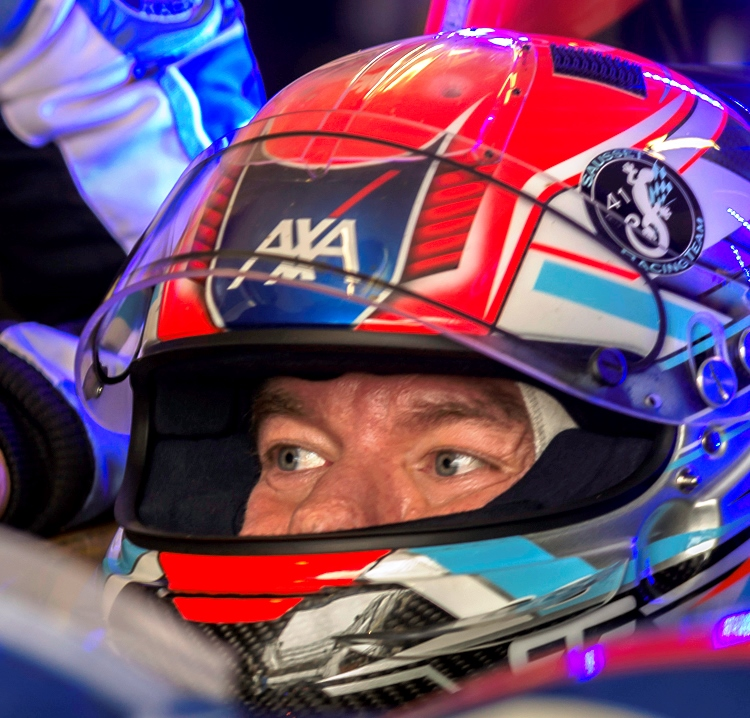
- Sausset in 2016
- Nationality: (France) French
- Born: 13 February 1969 (age 57) Blois, France
- Categorisation: FIA Bronze

Awards
- 2016: Autosport Pioneering and Innovation Award

Frédéric Maurice Pierre Sausset (born 13 February 1969) is a French businessman and racing driver. He made history as the first quadruple amputee to compete in the 24 Hours of Le Mans in 2016.

== Business ventures and personal life ==
Growing up in Blois, France, Sausset earned a Brevet de technicien supérieur in 1991, before working as a car salesman. In 1998, Sausset and his wife Frédérique began managing textile stores in his home town of Blois, as well as in Vendôme and Châteaudun. Alongside that, Sausset also served as the president of the Blois Federation of Commerce for three years, as well as being the vice-president of commerce for the Loir-et-Cher Chamber of Commerce and Industry between 2011 and 2012.

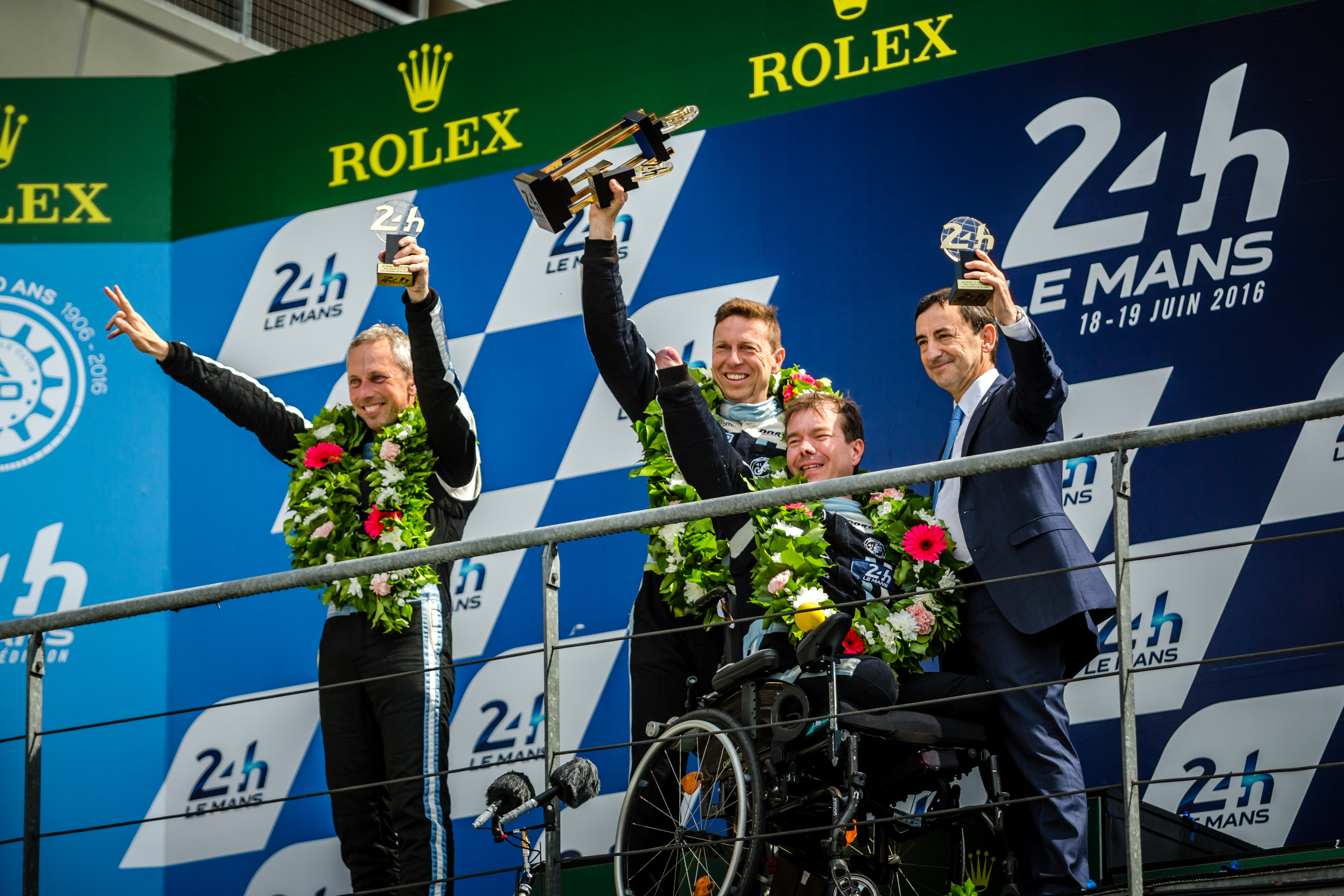
Sausset and his teammates on the 24 Hours of Le Mans podium in 2016.

During a vacation with his family in July 2012, Sausset contracted a rapidly progressing bacterial toxin that led to necrotizing sepsis, an extremely rare infection. Sausset then fell into a coma, and was treated at the Bayonne and Tours University Hospitals, but the doctors were forced to amputate his arms and legs. He eventually woke up from his coma towards the end of August. On October 17, 2012, Sausset began his rehabilitation process at La Membrolle-sur-Choisille, and underwent several surgeries until May 2013.

== Racing career ==
In the winter of 2012, Sausset set himself the goal of becoming the first quadriplegic driver to compete at the 24 Hours of Le Mans, which led him to establish Sausset Racing Team 41 the following year. Thanks to the support of his insurance company Axa, Sausset began testing a modified Ligier JS53 Evo in early 2014 for Onroak Automotive. The car was fitted with two long rods connecting to the pedals with two plates positioned under his thighs; his right arm stump was fitted into a prosthesis, which was attached to the steering wheel by a removable ankle; as well as an automatic gearbox and an eject button in case of an accident.

In 2015, Sausset made his competitive racing debut in the V de V Challenge Endurance Proto for his own team. Racing five times, Sausset's races were characterised by the disparity in duration of his driver changes, as it took him nearly four minutes to get in the car, compared to the 30 seconds for an able-bodied driver.

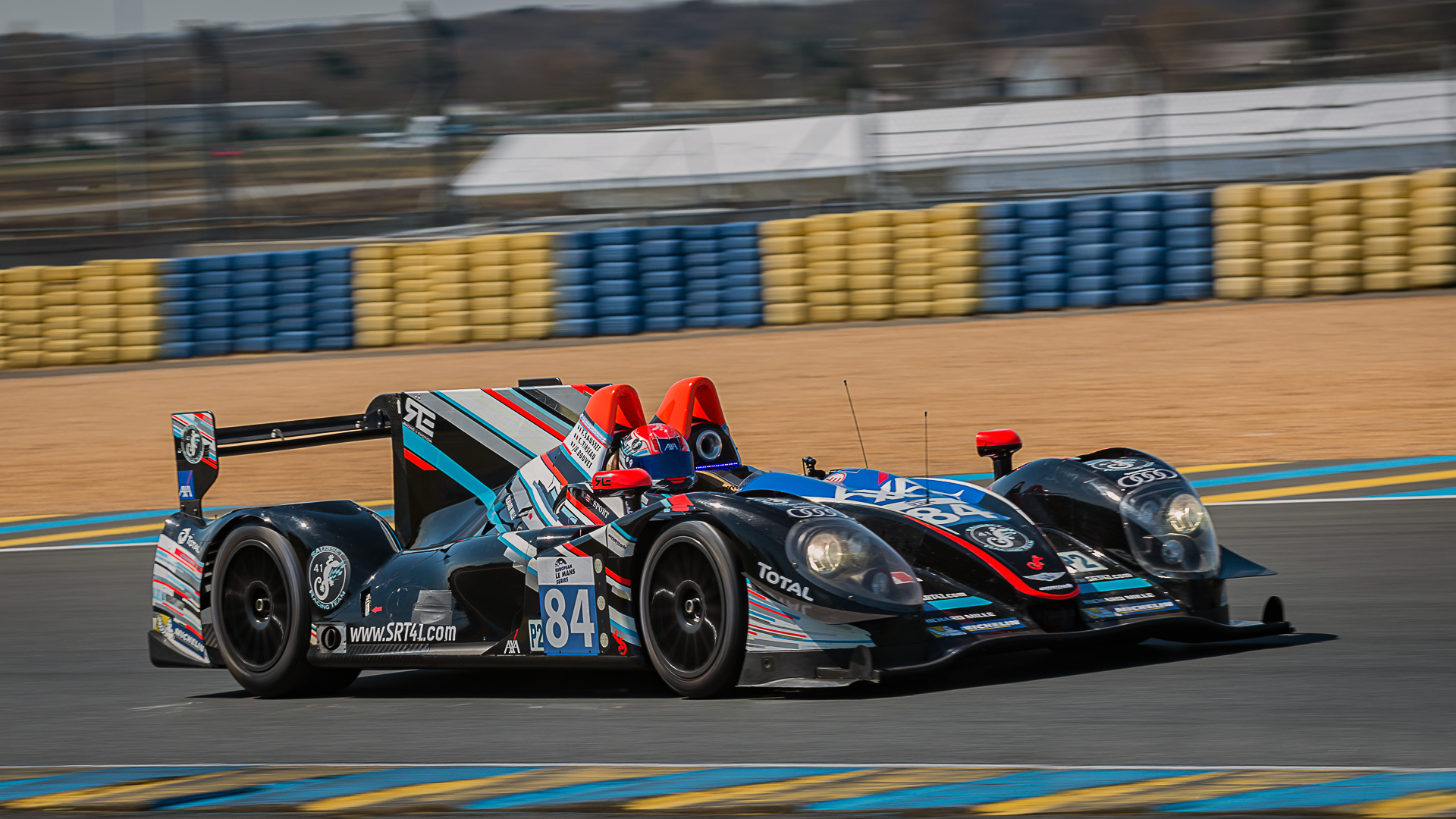
Sausset testing his modified Morgan LMP2 at the Circuit de la Sarthe in 2016.

In 2016, Sausset made a one-off appearance in the European Le Mans Series with a modified Morgan LMP2 at Silverstone for OAK Racing, as well as select appearances in the V de V Endurance Series with the same team. During that year, Sausset achieved his goal by racing at the 24 Hours of Le Mans in a Garage 56 entry alongside Jean-Bernard Bouvet and Christophe Tinseau, finishing 38th overall after a clutch issue cost the team one and a half hours in the pits. At the end of the year, Sausset was given the Pioneering and Innovation Award at the Autosport Awards in London.

After stepping back from racing, Sausset launched the Frédéric Sausset by SRT41 programme to promote drivers with disabilities and take them to the 2020 24 Hours of Le Mans. His SRT41 team came back into action two years later in VdeV with disabled trio Takuma Aoki, Snoussi Ben Moussa and Nigel Bailly, who went on to race at the 2019 Road to Le Mans in LMP3. After the Covid-19 pandemic halted the plans in early 2020, the entry to the French enduro was withdrawn, and the project was delayed until 2021. In 2021, SRT41 made select starts in the European Le Mans Series with a modified Oreca 07, with professional driver Pierre Sancinéna taking over the place of Moussa, who withdrew on personal grounds. For the 24 Hours of Le Mans, François Hériau was set to be the third driver, but was replaced by Matthieu Lahaye after picking up an injury. Five years on from Sausset's appearance as a driver, his team finished 32nd overall in its last competitive appearance to date.

== Racing record ==
=== Racing career summary ===
Season	Series	Team	Races	Wins	Poles	F/Laps	Podiums	Points	Position
2015	V de V Challenge Endurance Proto – Scratch	SRT 41	5	0	0	0	0		
2016	V de V Endurance Series – LMP3	OAK Racing	1	0	0	0	0		
2016	V de V Challenge Endurance Moderne – Proto	SRT 41	2	0	0	0	0		
2016	European Le Mans Series – Innovative	SRT41 by OAK Racing	1	N/A					NC
2016	24 Hours of Le Mans – Innovative	SRT41 by OAK Racing	1	0	0	0	0	—N/a	38th

=== Complete 24 Hours of Le Mans results ===
Year	Team	Co-Drivers	Car	Class	Laps	Pos.	Class Pos.
2016	(France) SRT41 by OAK Racing	(France) Jean-Bernard Bouvet (France) Christophe Tinseau	Morgan LMP2-Nissan	CDNT	315	38th	–
